= List of political parties in Hong Kong =

Hong Kong has a multi-party system, with numerous parties in which no one party was large enough to gain power by controlling the Legislative Council. The Chief Executive is appointed by the Premier of China based on a vote of the Election Committee and is nominally nonpartisan as specified in the Chief Executive Election Ordinance. Once selected, the Chief Executive forms a government which superficially has to rely on political parties in the legislature for support, but the legislature has been deliberately designed and redesigned to be a pro-Beijing rubber stamp body.

Hong Kong has no legislation for political parties; thus, it has no legal definition for what a political party is. Most political parties and political groups registered either as limited companies or societies.

In Hong Kong, there were two main political ideological blocs, which presents to pro-democracy camp (include localists) and pro-Beijing camp. Under the newly introduced electoral system since 2021, only government-approved candidates may run, effectively disqualifying any candidates who are not from the pro-Beijing camp or approved by Beijing. Most of the pro-democracy camp Legislative Councillors from the previous LegCo have been jailed by the Hong Kong government and are therefore disqualified from participating in elections without the need for government vetting.

== Present parties ==
There are 9 major political groups represented in the Legislative Council, including trade unions, professional associations and pressure groups. Two further political groups (New Territories Association of Societies and Civil Force) are represented by those members.

=== Major parties ===
Party		Founded	Camp	Ideology	Leader	8th Legislative Council		7th District Councils	
Party		Founded	Camp	Ideology	Leader	Seat	Vote share	Seat	Vote share
DAB	Democratic Alliance for the Betterment and Progress of Hong Kong 民主建港協進聯盟	10 July 1992	Pro-Beijing	Conservatism (HK); Chinese nationalism Social conservatism	Gary Chan	20 / 90	33.88%	147 / 470	41.58%
BPA	Business and Professionals Alliance for Hong Kong 香港經濟民生聯盟	7 October 2012	Pro-Beijing	Conservatism (HK); Economic liberalism Chinese nationalism	Lo Wai-kwok	8 / 90	3.02%	24 / 470	5.04%
FTU	Hong Kong Federation of Trade Unions 香港工會聯合會	17 April 1948	Pro-Beijing	Conservatism (HK); Socialism (HK); Socialist patriotism	Ng Chau-pei	7 / 90	20.39%	43 / 470	17.61%
LP	Liberal Party 自由黨	6 June 1993	Pro-Beijing	Conservatism (HK); Economic liberalism; Liberal conservatism	Tommy Cheung	4 / 90	2.54%	8 / 470	1.67%
FEW	Hong Kong Federation of Education Workers 香港教育工作者聯會	13 April 1975	Pro-Beijing	Conservatism (HK); Chinese nationalism; Labourism	Lau Chi-pang	4 / 90	Did not run in GCs	DNP	
NPP	New People's Party 新民黨	9 January 2011	Pro-Beijing	Conservatism (HK); Chinese nationalism; National conservatism	Regina Ip	3 / 90	11.52%	25 / 470	8.52%
KWND	Kowloon West New Dynamic 西九新動力	16 March 2008	Pro-Beijing	Conservatism (HK); Economic liberalism	Priscilla Leung	3 / 90	2.01%	6 / 470	No elected
FLU	Federation of Hong Kong and Kowloon Labour Unions 港九勞工社團聯會	November 1984	Pro-Beijing	Conservatism (HK) Labourism	Lam Chun-sing	2 / 90	Did not run in GCs	3 / 470	1.06%
PP	Professional Power 專業動力	2010	Pro-Beijing	Conservatism (HK); Centrism	Christine Fong	1 / 90	4.61%	1 / 470	2.01%
NTAS	New Territories Association of Societies 新界社團聯會	1985	Pro-Beijing	Conservatism (HK); Chinese nationalism	Chan Yung	1 / 90	3.26%	1 / 479	0.48%
RT	Roundtable 實政圓桌	7 May 2015	Pro-Beijing	Conservatism (HK); Moderate conservatism	Michael Tien	1 / 90	2.72%	0 / 470	0.61%
CF	Civil Force 公民力量	1993	Pro-Beijing	Conservatism (HK); Chinese nationalism	Pun Kwok-shan	1 / 90	NPP ticket	17 / 470	NPP ticket

=== Other parties and groups ===
Other parties and groups without legislative representation that have participated in the elections include:

Party	Founded	Leader	Camp	Ideology	Note
Hong Kong and Kowloon Trades Union Council (港九工團聯合總會/工團)	September 1948		Pro-ROC	Tridemism; Anti-communism (HK); Labourism	
Hong Kong Association for Democracy and People's Livelihood (香港民主民生協進會)	26 October 1986	Bruce Liu	Pro-democracy	Liberalism (HK); Social democracy Social liberalism	
Hong Kong Chinese Reform Association (香港華人革新協會)	8 May 1949		Pro-Beijing	Chinese nationalism	
Hong Kong Civic Association (香港公民協會)	26 October 1954		Pro-Beijing	Conservatism (HK); Liberal conservatism	
Labour Party (工黨)	18 December 2011		Pro-democracy	Social democracy Environmentalism; Liberalism (HK)	
Neighbourhood and Worker's Service Centre (街坊工友服務處)	1985		Pro-democracy	Social democracy Liberalism (Hong Kong)	
New Century Forum (新世紀論壇)	23 June 1999	Ma Fung-kwok	Pro-Beijing	Conservatism (HK); Chinese nationalism	
New Prospect for Hong Kong (香港新方向)	October 2019	Marco Liu	Pro-Beijing	Conservatism (HK); Gang Piao Interests	
Path of Democracy (民主思路)	8 June 2015	Ronny Tong	Centrist	Centrism (HK)	
Professional Commons (公共專業聯盟)	25 March 2007		Pro-democracy	Liberalism (HK)	
Third Side (新思維)	3 January 2016	Tik Chi-yuen	Centrist	Liberalism (HK); Centrism (HK)	

==== Pro-Democracy camp ====
- 2047 Hong Kong Monitor (2047香港監察)
- 7.1 People Pile (七一人民批)
- April Fifth Action (四五行動)
- Chinese Labour Party (中國工黨)
- Chinese Liberal Democratic Party (中國自由民主黨)
- China Youth Service & Recreation Centre (神州青年服務社)
- Citizens' Radio (民間電台)
- Civic Act-Up (公民起動) (part of Labour Party)
- The Frontier (前綫)
- HK First (香港本土)
- Hong Kong Awakening Association (香港關注會)
- Hong Kong Caritas Employees Union (香港明愛員工會)
- Hong Kong Chinese Medicine Practitioners' Rights General Union (香港中醫師權益總工會)
- Hong Kong Democratic Development Network (香港民主發展網絡)
- Hong Kong Democratic Foundation (香港民主促進會)
- Hong Kong Independence Party (香港獨立黨)
- Hong Kong Social Workers' General Union (香港社會工作者總工會/社總)
- Land Justice League (土地正義聯盟)
- Pioneer of Victoria Park (維園衝鋒)
- Power Voters (選民力量) (part of People Power)
- Revolutionary Communist Party of China (中國革命共產黨, October Review)
- Socialist Action (社會主義行動)
- Southern Democratic Alliance (南方民主同盟)
- Synergy Kowloon (九龍角落)

==== Pro-Beijing camp ====
- Bauhinia Party (紫荊黨)
- Business and Professionals Federation of Hong Kong (香港工商專業聯會)
- Education Convergence (教育評議會)
- Government Disciplined Services General Union (政府紀律部隊人員總工會)
- Hong Kong Localism Power (香港本土力量), a pro-Beijing conservative political party, contrary to its name.
- Hong Kong Medical Association (香港醫學會)
- Hong Kong Public Doctors' Association (香港公共醫療醫生協會)
- Hong Kong Women Teachers' Organization (香港女教師協會)
- Justice Alliance (正義聯盟)
- New Youth Forum (新青年論壇)
- HK Round Table On People’s Livelihood (民生圓桌)
- Politihk Social Strategic (香港政研會)
- Third Force (第3力量)
- Voice of Loving Hong Kong (愛港之聲)

==== Localist groups ====
- Christians to the World (蒞地基督徒)
- Conservative Party (香港保守黨)
- Empowering Hong Kong (匯政衞言)
- Hong Kong Indigenous (本土民主前線)
- Hong Kong Resurgence Order (香港復興會)
- Kowloon East Community (東九龍社區關注組)
- Nationalist Hong Kong (國民香港)
- Proletariat Political Institute (普羅政治學苑)

==== Umbrella organisations ====
- Ching Fat Living Concern Group (青發生活關注組)
- North of the Rings (北區動源)
- Tsuen Wan Dynamic for the People (荃灣民生動力)

==== Others ====
- Alliance for Social and Economic Advancement (保障民生建設聯盟)
- Green Party of Hong Kong (香港綠黨)
- Hong Kong People's Livelihood Party (香港民生黨)
- MESSAGE (快信社會服務團)

== Regional organisations, communal pressure groups and Kaifong associations ==
- Action 18 (動員十八)
- Ap Lei Chau Community Trade Union (鴨脷洲社區職工會)
- Cheung Sha Wan West Front (長沙灣西社區陣線)
- Choi Hung Estate Social Service Association (彩虹邨服務聯會)
- Concern Group for Tseung Kwan O People's Livelihood (將軍澳民生關注組)
- Community Alliance (區政聯盟)
- Deliberation Tsuen Wan (荃民議政)
- Fu Sun Generation (富新一代)
- Heung Yee Kuk (鄉議局)
- Hong Kong Island Federation (香港島各界聯合會)
- HTTH Environmental Concern Group (興東東熹環境關注組)
- Kowloon East Community (東九龍社區關注組)
- Kowloon Federation of Associations (九龍社團聯會)
  - Fu Cheong Hung Estate Residents' Association (富昌邨居民協會)
  - Kwun Tong Residents Association (觀塘民眾聯誼會)
- Hong Kong People's Council on Housing Policy (香港房屋政策評議會)
- Kowloon West New Dynamic (西九新動力)
- New Territories Association of Societies (新界社團聯會)
  - New Territories West Residents Association (新界西居民聯會)
  - Hong Kong Tin Shui Wai Women Association (香港天水圍婦女聯會)
- Luen Wo United (聯和匯聚)
- Lung Mun Concern Group (龍門關注組)
- North District Blueprint (北區藍圖)
- North of the Rings (北區動源)
- Sai Kung Commons (西頁鄉民)
- Sha Tin Community Network (沙田社區網絡)
- Sha Tin Community Vision (沙田社區關注社)
- Shau Kei Wan East Future (灣東願景)
- Tai Po Sunwalker (埔向晴天)
- Tsuen Wan Community Network (荃灣社區網絡)
- Tuen Mun Community (屯門社區關注組)
- Tai Po Democratic Alliance (大埔民主聯盟)
- Tai Po Network of Democracy and Livelihood (大埔民主民生網絡)
- Tin Shui Wai Connection (天水連線)
- Tin Shui Wai Livelihood Progression Union (天水圍地區民生促進會)
- Tseung Kwan O Pioneers (將軍澳青年力量)
- Tseung Kwan O Shining (將向天晴)
- Tsing Yi Concern Group (青衣關注組)
- Tsing Yi People (青衣島民)
- Tsuen Wan Dynamic for the People (荃灣民生動力)
- Unity of San Hui (屯結新墟)

== Electoral coalitions ==
- 7.1 United Front (七一連線)
- A16 Alliance (A16聯盟)
- ABC.P.A
- Academics In Support of Democracy (高教界民主行動)
- Action 9 (9人起動)
- Alliance of Housing Department Staff Unions (房屋署工會大聯盟)
- ALLinHK
- Central and Western Democratic Power (中西區民主力量)
- Civic Passion–Proletariat Political Institute–Hong Kong Resurgence Order (熱普城)
- Coalition of Hong Kong Newspaper and Magazine Merchant (全港報販大聯盟)
- Democrat Professionals Hong Kong (專業‧民主‧起動)
- Democratic Accountants (民主會計師)
- Democratic Coalition for DC Election (泛民區選聯盟/民主派區選聯盟)
- Demo-Social 12/Demo-Social 60/Demo-Social Front (民福12/民福60/民褔陣線)
- Doctors for Democracy (真普選醫生聯盟)
- Engineers for Universal Suffrage (普選工程連線)
- Gov.ALPS (建園規測)
- Health Professionals for Democracy 30 (衞‧真普30)
- Hearts of Accountants (誠、會計師團隊)
- ICT Energy (ICT動力)
- IT Voice/IT Voice 2012/IT Vision
- O Superpower (長權)
- People Power–League of Social Democrats (進步民主連線)
- Progressive Social Work (進步社工)
- Students United 2017 (學界同盟 2017)
- Tertiary 2012 (大專2012)
- Together for Social Welfare (社福同行)
- User Voice (持份發聲)
- V18 Accountants (V18會計專業聯盟)
- Vox Pop
- Welfare Empower Hong Kong (社福動力)
- Win Win Hong Kong Accountants (香港共贏會計師)
- Y5 Give Me Five (Y5正能量)
- Your Vote Counts (票在你手/計您一票)

== Defunct ==
=== Former major parties ===
The following are political parties or groups that have won at least a seat in legislative or municipal elections and have been dissolved.

Party	Founded	Dissolved	Camp	Ideology	Note
123 Democratic Alliance (一二三民主聯盟)	20 March 1994	3 December 2000	Pro-Taiwan camp	Liberalism (HK); Conservatism (Taiwan); Anti-communism (HK); Tridemism	
Basic Law Article 45 Concern Group (《基本法》四十五條關注組)	2003	19 March 2006	Pro-democracy		Transformed into Civic Party
Co-operative Resources Centre (啟聯資源中心)	12 December 1991	31 March 1993	Conservatives	Conservatism (Hong Kong); Economic liberalism	Transformed into Liberal Party
Citizens Party (民權黨)	4 May 1997	9 May 2008	Pro-democracy	Liberalism (HK); Environmentalism	
Civic Party (公民黨)	19 March 2006	27 May 2023	Pro-democracy	Constitutionalism; Liberalism (Hong Kong); Social liberalism	
Civic Passion (熱血公民)	29 February 2012	3 September 2021	Localists	Localism (HK); Hong Kong nationalism	
Democratic Party (民主黨)	2 October 1994	14 December 2025	Pro-democracy	Liberalism (HK)	
Demosistō (香港眾志)	10 April 2016	30 June 2020	Pro-democracy	Liberalism; Progressivism; Left-wing localism	Dissolved after national security law imposed
Economic Synergy (經濟動力)	16 June 2009	October 2012	Pro-Beijing	Conservatism; Economic liberalism	Transformed into Business and Professionals Alliance for Hong Kong and effectively dissolved
Federation for the Stability of Hong Kong (穩定香港協會)	16 May 1991	4 June 2010	Pro-Beijing	Conservatism (HK)	Merged into Hong Kong Progressive Alliance
Hong Kong Affairs Society (太平山學會)	February 1984	April 1990	Liberals	Liberalism (HK)	Merged into United Democrats of Hong Kong
Hong Kong Confederation of Trade Unions (香港職工會聯盟)	29 July 1990	3 October 2021	Pro-democracy	Labourism; Liberalism (HK)	
Hong Kong People's Council on Housing Policy (香港房屋政策評議會)	1978	9 June 2019	Pro-democracy	Pressure group	
Hong Kong Professional Teachers' Union (香港教育專業人員協會)	1973	11 September 2021	Pro-democracy	Teacher's union	
Hong Kong Progressive Alliance (香港協進聯盟)	7 July 1994	16 February 2005	Pro-Beijing	Chinese nationalism; Conservatism (HK); Economic liberalism	Merged into Democratic Alliance for the Betterment and Progress of Hong Kong
League of Social Democrats (社會民主連線)	1 October 2006	29 June 2025	Pro-democracy	Social democracy; Left-wing populism	
Liberal Democratic Federation of Hong Kong (香港自由民主聯會)	6 November 1990	26 May 1997	Conservatives	Conservatism (HK); Economic liberalism	Merged into Hong Kong Progressive Alliance
Meeting Point (匯點)	9 January 1983	2 October 1994	Liberals	Liberalism (HK); Chinese nationalism	Merged into Democratic Party
Neo Democrats (新民主同盟)	2 October 2010	26 June 2021	Pro-democracy	Localism (HK); Liberalism (HK); Populism	
New Hong Kong Alliance (新香港聯盟)	1 May 1989	1999	Conservatives	Chinese nationalism; Ultraconservatism (HK); Economic liberalism	
People Power (人民力量)	3 April 2011	November 2025	Pro-democracy	Localism (HK) Radical democracy Populism	
Professional Forum (專業會議)	1991	7 October 2012	Pro-Beijing	Conservatism (HK) Economic liberalism	Transformed into Business and Professionals Alliance for Hong Kong
Progressive Hong Kong Society (香港勵進會)	14 February 1985	6 November 1990	Conservatives	Conservatism (HK)	Merged into Liberal Democratic Federation of Hong Kong
Reform Club of Hong Kong (香港革新會)	20 January 1949	1995		Liberalism (HK)	Effectively dissolved
The Frontier (前綫)	26 August 1996	23 November 2008	Pro-democracy	Environmentalism; Social democracy; Social liberalism	Merged into Democratic Party
United Ants (蟻聯)	1990s		Liberals		
United Democrats of Hong Kong (香港民主同盟)	23 April 1990	2 October 1994	Liberals	Liberalism (HK)	Merged into Democratic Party

=== Other dissolved parties ===
- Alliance for Universal Suffrage (終極普選聯盟)
- Association for Democracy and Justice (民主公義協會)
- Cheung Sha Wan Community Establishment Power (長沙灣社區發展力量)
- Community March (社區前進)
- Community Sha Tin (沙田區政)
- Constitutional Reform Association of Hong Kong
- Democratic Alliance (民主陣線)
- Democratic Progressive Party of Hong Kong (香港民主進步黨)
- Democratic Self-Government Party of Hong Kong (香港民主自治黨)
- Frontline Doctors' Union (前線醫生聯盟)
- Hong Kong Alliance of Chinese and Expatriates (香港中外聯盟)
- Hong Kong Citizen Forum (港人論壇)
- Hong Kong Forum (香港論壇)
- Hong Kong National Party (香港民族黨)
- Hong Kong Observers (香港觀察社)
- Hong Kong People's Association (港人協會)
- Hong Kong Policy Viewers (香港政策透視)
- Hong Kong Prospect Institute (香港前景研究社)
- Hong Kong Socialist Democratic Party (香港社會民主黨)
- Kowloon City Observers (九龍城觀察社)
- Kowloon Residents' Association (九龍居民協會)
- Liberal Democratic Party (自由民主黨)
- New Hong Kong Society (新香港學社)
- New Territories West Residents Association (新界西居民聯會)
- Power for Democracy (民主動力)
- Public Affairs Society (公共事務評議會)
- Social Democratic Forum (社會民主論壇)
- Social Democratic Front (社會民主陣線)
- Team Chu Hoi Dick of New Territories West (朱凱廸新西團隊)
- Tin Shui Wai New Force (天水圍民生關注平台)
- Tsz Wan Shan Constructive Power (慈雲山建設力量)
- Tuen Mun Community Network (屯門社區網絡)
- United Front for the Service of the People (全民社區服務聯線)
- United Nations Association of Hong Kong (聯合國香港協會)
- Victoria Social Association (維多利亞社區協會)

== See also ==
- Lists of political parties
- United front in Hong Kong
- United Front Work Department
- United front (China)
- List of political parties in the People's Republic of China
- List of political parties in the Republic of China
- List of political parties in Macau
- 2021 Hong Kong electoral changes
