= 7th District Councils of Hong Kong =

7th District Councils of Hong Kong 香港第七屆區議會
| ← | 6th | 8th | → |

Overview
- Jurisdiction: Hong Kong
- Term: 1 January 2024 to 31 December 2027
- Members: 470

The Seventh District Councils of Hong Kong (Chinese: 香港第七屆區議會) is the current meeting of the local councils of the Hong Kong Special Administrative Region Government, starting from 1 January 2024 after the 2023 local elections. This is also the first meeting after the government revamped the deliberation bodies with seats elected by electoral college and appointed by the government, and the first where pro-Beijing members captured all seats after no moderates or democrats were able to enter the race.

== Leadership ==
Following the government's revamp, each District Council is chaired by the District Officer from the civil service, and no longer elected amongst members.

| District | Chairperson | Term start | Term end | Notes |
|---|---|---|---|---|
| Central and Western | David Leung Chee-kay | 1 January 2024 | 12 February 2025 | DO since 30 June 2020 |
| Central and Western | Jeanne Cheng | 13 February 2025 | Incumbent | |
| Wan Chai | Fanny Cheung Ngan-ling | 1 January 2024 | Incumbent | DO since 9 January 2023 |
| Eastern | Simon Chan Sheung-man | 1 January 2024 | 21 April 2025 | DO since 13 June 2018 |
| Eastern | Henry Lai | 22 April 2025 | Incumbent | |
| Southern | Francis Cheng Kong-chung | 1 January 2024 | 9 March 2025 | DO since 31 December 2019 |
| Southern | Sandy Cheung Pui-shan | 10 March 2025 | Incumbent | |
| Yau Tsim Mong | Edward Yu Kin-keung | 1 January 2024 | Incumbent | DO since 18 March 2020 |
| Sham Shui Po | Paul Wong Yan-yin | 1 January 2024 | May 2025 | DO since 14 December 2020 |
| Sham Shui Po | Oscar Wong Ho-yu | 20 June 2025 | Incumbent | |
| Kowloon City | Alice Choi Man-kwan | 1 January 2024 | 24 January 2025 | DO since 13 July 2020 |
| Kowloon City | Ivanhoe Chang Chi-ho | 25 January 2025 | Incumbent | |
| Wong Tai Sin | Thomas Wu Kui-wah | 1 January 2024 | Incumbent | DO since 3 September 2023 |
| Kwun Tong | Denny Ho Lap-ki | 1 January 2024 | Incumbent | DO since 3 October 2023 |
| Tsuen Wan | Billy Au Ka-shing | 1 January 2024 | Incumbent | DO since 29 November 2021 |
| Tuen Mun | Michael Kwan Ke-lin | 1 January 2024 | Incumbent | DO since 26 June 2023 |
| Yuen Long | Gordon Wu Tin-yau | 1 January 2024 | Incumbent | DO since 29 April 2021 |
| North | Derek Lai Chi-kin | 1 January 2024 | 20 July 2025 | DO since 31 July 2023 |
| North | Winkie Chick Wing-yin | 21 July 2025 | Incumbent | |
| Tai Po | Eunice Chan Hau-man | 1 January 2024 | Incumbent | DO since 25 October 2018 |
| Sai Kung | Kathy Ma King-fan | 1 January 2024 | Incumbent | DO since 16 October 2023 |
| Sha Tin | Frederick Yu Wai-shing | 1 January 2024 | Incumbent | DO since 25 August 2023 |
| Kwai Tsing | Huggin Tang | 1 January 2024 | 10 August 2025 | DO since 13 September 2022 |
| Kwai Tsing | Edric Leung Sing-lung | 11 August 2025 | Incumbent | |
| Islands | Amy Yeung Wai-sum | 1 January 2024 | Incumbent | DO since 18 July 2020 |

== Appointed members ==
Constitutional Secretary Erick Tsang confirmed no defeated candidates in the election would be appointed to the District Councils, in order to defuse public's concern. The government announced the list of appointed and ex officio members on 12 December, two days after the poll.

Amongst the 179 appointed councillors, 49 were pro-Beijing members that had lost to democrats in 2019. A member of Path of Democracy, the pro-Beijing moderate party, was selected to enter Yuen Long District Council after the party failed to win a seat in direct elections. Care Team members were also on the list of appointments. With the inclusion of elected councillors and those chosen by the government-appointed District Committees, a majority of 87% were members of the District Committees, which are also responsible for nominating candidates.

== List of members ==
=== Hong Kong Island ===
==== Central and Western ====
| Capacity | Code | Constituency | Name | Political affiliation | Term | | Notes |
|---|---|---|---|---|---|---|---|
| Elected | A01 | Central | Jan Noel Shih | DAB | 1 January 2024 | Incumbent | |
| Elected | A01 | Central | Karl Fung Kar-leung | Liberal | 1 January 2024 | Incumbent | |
| Elected | A02 | Western | Timothy Lau Tin-ching | DAB | 1 January 2024 | Incumbent | |
| Elected | A02 | Western | Mandy Wong Sin-man | Independent | 1 January 2024 | Incumbent | |
| District Committees | | | Yeung Hok-ming | DAB | 1 January 2024 | Incumbent | |
| District Committees | | | Iris Cheung Ka-yan | DAB | 1 January 2024 | Incumbent | |
| District Committees | | | Yeung Hoi-wing | DAB | 1 January 2024 | Incumbent | |
| District Committees | | | Sidney Lee Chi-hang | Independent | 1 January 2024 | Incumbent | |
| District Committees | | | Zhang Zong | Independent | 1 January 2024 | Incumbent | |
| District Committees | | | Law Kam-fai | Independent | 1 January 2024 | Incumbent | |
| District Committees | | | Chiu Wah-kuen | Independent | 1 January 2024 | Incumbent | |
| District Committees | | | Wu Man-hin | Independent | 1 January 2024 | Incumbent | |
| Appointed | | | Ip Yik-nam | DAB | 1 January 2024 | Incumbent | |
| Appointed | | | Ben Lui Hung-pan | FTU | 1 January 2024 | Incumbent | |
| Appointed | | | Jeremy Young Chit-on | Liberal | 1 January 2024 | Incumbent | |
| Appointed | | | Ng Yin | Independent | 1 January 2024 | Incumbent | |
| Appointed | | | Qiu Songqing | Independent | 1 January 2024 | Incumbent | |
| Appointed | | | Jin Ling | Independent | 1 January 2024 | Incumbent | |
| Appointed | | | Eugene Chan Kin-keung | Independent | 1 January 2024 | Incumbent | |
| Appointed | | | Yip Wing-shing | Independent | 1 January 2024 | Incumbent | |

==== Wan Chai ====
| Capacity | Code | Constituency | Name | Political affiliation | Term | | Notes |
|---|---|---|---|---|---|---|---|
| Elected | B01 | Wan Chai | Nicholas Muk Ka-chun | DAB | 1 January 2024 | Incumbent | |
| Elected | B01 | Wan Chai | Peggy Lee Pik-yee | Independent | 1 January 2024 | Incumbent | |
| District Committees | | | Joey Lee Man-lung | NPP | 1 January 2024 | Incumbent | |
| District Committees | | | Wind Lam Wai-man | Liberal | 1 January 2024 | Incumbent | |
| District Committees | | | Sam Ng Chak-sum | Independent | 1 January 2024 | Incumbent | |
| District Committees | | | Ruby Mok | Independent | 1 January 2024 | Incumbent | |
| Appointed | | | Lam Wai-kong | FTU | 1 January 2024 | Incumbent | |
| Appointed | | | Chow Kam-wai | Liberal | 1 January 2024 | Incumbent | |
| Appointed | | | Sun Tao-hung | Independent | 1 January 2024 | Incumbent | |
| Appointed | | | Lau Pui-shan | Independent | 1 January 2024 | Incumbent | |

==== Eastern ====
| Capacity | Code | Constituency | Name | Political affiliation | Term | | Notes |
|---|---|---|---|---|---|---|---|
| Elected | C01 | Tai Pak | Eddie Ting Ko-ho | DAB | 1 January 2024 | Incumbent | |
| Elected | C01 | Tai Pak | Kenny Yuen Kin-chung | Liberal | 1 January 2024 | Incumbent | |
| Elected | C02 | Hong Wan | Annie Lee Ching-har | DAB | 1 January 2024 | Incumbent | |
| Elected | C02 | Hong Wan | Ng Ching-ching | FTU | 1 January 2024 | Incumbent | |
| Elected | C03 | Chai Wan | Elaine Chik Kit-ling | DAB | 1 January 2024 | Incumbent | |
| Elected | C03 | Chai Wan | Stanley Ho Ngai-kam | FTU | 1 January 2024 | Incumbent | |
| District Committees | | | Wong Chi-chung | DAB | 1 January 2024 | Incumbent | |
| District Committees | | | Lam Wing-shing | DAB | 1 January 2024 | Incumbent | |
| District Committees | | | Hung Chi-kit | DAB | 1 January 2024 | Incumbent | |
| District Committees | | | Kwok Wing-kin | DAB | 1 January 2024 | Incumbent | |
| District Committees | | | Joseph Chan Hoi-wing | DAB | 1 January 2024 | Incumbent | |
| District Committees | | | Lau Suk-yin | DAB | 1 January 2024 | Incumbent | |
| District Committees | | | Dana Lau Shing-she | NPP | 1 January 2024 | Incumbent | |
| District Committees | | | Tsang Cheuk-yi | Liberal | 1 January 2024 | Incumbent | |
| District Committees | | | Lam Wing-cheung | Independent | 1 January 2024 | Incumbent | |
| District Committees | | | Lin Caiying | Independent | 1 January 2024 | Incumbent | |
| District Committees | | | Hung Chiu-kwan | Independent | 1 January 2024 | Incumbent | |
| District Committees | | | Lai Nuen-san | Independent | 1 January 2024 | Incumbent | |
| Appointed | | | Lam Sum-lim | DAB | 1 January 2024 | Incumbent | |
| Appointed | | | Hung Lin-cham | DAB | 1 January 2024 | Incumbent | |
| Appointed | | | Cheng Chi-sing | DAB | 1 January 2024 | Incumbent | |
| Appointed | | | Lau Hing-yeung | DAB | 1 January 2024 | Incumbent | |
| Appointed | | | Liang Li | FTU | 1 January 2024 | Incumbent | |
| Appointed | | | Anthony Lu Xiaofeng | NPP | 1 January 2024 | Incumbent | |
| Appointed | | | Calvin Kwok Ho-king | NPP | 1 January 2024 | Incumbent | |
| Appointed | | | Kacee Ting Wong | BPA | 1 January 2024 | Incumbent | |
| Appointed | | | Zareenah Ho | Independent | 1 January 2024 | Incumbent | |
| Appointed | | | Li Lee | Independent | 1 January 2024 | Incumbent | |
| Appointed | | | Benny Chau Chi-yan | Independent | 1 January 2024 | Incumbent | |
| Appointed | | | Chan Hang | Independent | 1 January 2024 | Incumbent | |

==== Southern ====
| Capacity | Code | Constituency | Name | Political affiliation | Term | | Notes |
|---|---|---|---|---|---|---|---|
| Elected | D01 | Southern District Southeast | Chan Wing-yan | FTU | 1 January 2024 | Incumbent | |
| Elected | D01 | Southern District Southeast | Jonathan Leung Chun | Liberal | 1 January 2024 | Incumbent | |
| Elected | D02 | Southern District Northwest | Cheung Wai-nam | DAB | 1 January 2024 | Incumbent | |
| Elected | D02 | Southern District Northwest | Sophia Lam Wing-yan | FTU | 1 January 2024 | Incumbent | |
| District Committees | | | Sunny Wong Choi-lap | DAB | 1 January 2024 | Incumbent | |
| District Committees | | | Victor Lau Ngai | DAB | 1 January 2024 | Incumbent | |
| District Committees | | | Danny Siu Wai-chung | DAB | 1 January 2024 | Incumbent | |
| District Committees | | | Nicole Wong Yu-ching | NPP | 1 January 2024 | Incumbent | |
| District Committees | | | Adam Lai Ka-chi | BPA | 1 January 2024 | Incumbent | |
| District Committees | | | Howard Chao | BPA | 1 January 2024 | Incumbent | |
| District Committees | | | Lam Wing-yee | Independent | 1 January 2024 | Incumbent | |
| District Committees | | | Cheung Chin-chung | Independent | 1 January 2024 | Incumbent | |
| Appointed | | | Roy Chu Lap-wai | DAB | 1 January 2024 | Incumbent | |
| Appointed | | | Li Kai-ying | DAB | 1 January 2024 | Incumbent | |
| Appointed | | | Chan Yuk-kit | DAB | 1 January 2024 | Incumbent | |
| Appointed | | | Vera Ho Yuen-wei | NPP | 1 January 2024 | Incumbent | |
| Appointed | | | Lam Yuk-chun | Independent | 1 January 2024 | Incumbent | |
| Appointed | | | Chan Man-chun | Independent | 1 January 2024 | Incumbent | |
| Appointed | | | Pang Siu-kei | Independent | 1 January 2024 | Incumbent | |
| Appointed | | | Jun Yeung Sheung-chun | Independent | 1 January 2024 | Incumbent | |

=== Kowloon ===
==== Yau Tsim Mong ====
| Capacity | Code | Constituency | Name | Political affiliation | Term | | Notes |
|---|---|---|---|---|---|---|---|
| Elected | E01 | Yau Tsim Mong South | Chris Ip Ngo-tung | DAB | 1 January 2024 | Incumbent | |
| Elected | E01 | Yau Tsim Mong South | Guan Weixi | Independent | 1 January 2024 | Incumbent | |
| Elected | E02 | Yau Tsim Mong North | Lee Ka-hin | DAB | 1 January 2024 | Incumbent | |
| Elected | E02 | Yau Tsim Mong North | Li Sze-man | BPA | 1 January 2024 | Incumbent | |
| District Committees | | | Benjamin Choi Siu-fung | DAB | 1 January 2024 | Incumbent | |
| District Committees | | | Craig Jo Chun-wah | DAB | 1 January 2024 | Incumbent | |
| District Committees | | | Lau Pak-kei | DAB | 1 January 2024 | Incumbent | |
| District Committees | | | Alex Poon King-wo | DAB | 1 January 2024 | Incumbent | |
| District Committees | | | Suen Chi-man | FTU | 1 January 2024 | Incumbent | |
| District Committees | | | Wong Kin-san | BPA | 1 January 2024 | Incumbent | |
| District Committees | | | Luk Tsz-fung | Independent | 1 January 2024 | Incumbent | |
| District Committees | | | Michelle Tang Ming-sum | Independent | 1 January 2024 | Incumbent | |
| Appointed | | | Benny Yeung Tsz-hei | DAB | 1 January 2024 | Incumbent | |
| Appointed | | | Edmong Chung Kong-mo | DAB | 1 January 2024 | Incumbent | |
| Appointed | | | Au Chor-kwan | Independent | 1 January 2024 | Incumbent | |
| Appointed | | | Hui Tak-leung | FTU | 1 January 2024 | Incumbent | |
| Appointed | | | Chan Siu-tong | BPA | 1 January 2024 | Incumbent | |
| Appointed | | | Rowena Wong Shu-ming | BPA | 1 January 2024 | Incumbent | |
| Appointed | | | Chung Chak-fai | Independent | 1 January 2024 | Incumbent | |
| Appointed | | | Aruna Gurung | Independent | 1 January 2024 | Incumbent | |

==== Sham Shui Po ====
| Capacity | Code | Constituency | Name | Political affiliation | Term | | Notes |
|---|---|---|---|---|---|---|---|
| Elected | F01 | Sham Shui Po West | Leo Ho Kwan-chau | DAB | 1 January 2024 | Incumbent | |
| Elected | F01 | Sham Shui Po West | Wu Sze-wan | Independent | 1 January 2024 | Incumbent | |
| Elected | F02 | Sham Shui Po East | Raymond Lam Wai-man | DAB | 1 January 2024 | Incumbent | |
| Elected | F02 | Sham Shui Po East | Chan Kwok-wai | BPA | 1 January 2024 | Incumbent | |
| District Committees | | | Wu Wanqiu | DAB | 1 January 2024 | Incumbent | |
| District Committees | | | Cheung Tak-wai | DAB | 1 January 2024 | Incumbent | |
| District Committees | | | Chan Lung-kit | DAB | 1 January 2024 | Incumbent | |
| District Committees | | | Jeffrey Pong Chiu-fai | BPA | 1 January 2024 | Incumbent | |
| District Committees | | | Chen Lihong | FLU | 1 January 2024 | Incumbent | |
| District Committees | | | Leung Ping-kin | Independent | 1 January 2024 | Incumbent | |
| District Committees | | | Chum Pik-wa | Independent | 1 January 2024 | Incumbent | |
| District Committees | | | Hanson Wong Chun-hung | Independent | 1 January 2024 | Incumbent | |
| Appointed | | | Samuel Chan Wai-ming | DAB | 1 January 2024 | Incumbent | |
| Appointed | | | Wong Chung-leung | DAB | 1 January 2024 | Incumbent | |
| Appointed | | | Nicole Lau Pui-yuk | DAB | 1 January 2024 | Incumbent | |
| Appointed | | | Aaron Lam Ka-fai | BPA | 1 January 2024 | Incumbent | |
| Appointed | | | Lee Wing-man | FLU | 1 January 2024 | Incumbent | |
| Appointed | | | Kwok Yin-lai | Independent | 1 January 2024 | Incumbent | |
| Appointed | | | Chung Ching-may | Independent | 1 January 2024 | Incumbent | |
| Appointed | | | Lo Chi-chiu | Independent | 1 January 2024 | Incumbent | |

==== Kowloon City ====
| Capacity | Code | Constituency | Name | Political affiliation | Term | | Notes |
|---|---|---|---|---|---|---|---|
| Elected | G01 | Kowloon City North | Lam Pok | Independent | 1 January 2024 | Incumbent | |
| Elected | G01 | Kowloon City North | Yeung Chun-yu | DAB | 1 January 2024 | Incumbent | |
| Elected | G02 | Kowloon City South | Lee Chiu-yiu | BPA | 1 January 2024 | Incumbent | |
| Elected | G02 | Kowloon City South | Ng Po-keung | DAB | 1 January 2024 | Incumbent | |
| District Committees | | | Chan Chi-wah | DAB | 1 January 2024 | Incumbent | |
| District Committees | | | Ng Po-keung | DAB | 1 January 2024 | Incumbent | |
| District Committees | | | Leung Yuen-ting | BPA | 1 January 2024 | Incumbent | |
| District Committees | | | Fung Mo-kwan | Independent | 1 January 2024 | Incumbent | |
| District Committees | | | Rita Lau Yuen-yin | Independent | 1 January 2024 | Incumbent | |
| District Committees | | | Wong Cho | Independent | 1 January 2024 | Incumbent | |
| District Committees | | | Cheung King-fan | Independent | 1 January 2024 | Incumbent | |
| District Committees | | | Ting Kin-wah | Independent | 1 January 2024 | Incumbent | |
| Appointed | | | Lam Tak-shing | DAB | 1 January 2024 | Incumbent | |
| Appointed | | | Poon Kwok-wah | DAB | 1 January 2024 | Incumbent | |
| Appointed | | | Felix Wong Man-kwong | FTU | 1 January 2024 | Incumbent | |
| Appointed | | | Steven Cho Wui-hung | BPA | 1 January 2024 | Incumbent | |
| Appointed | | | He Huahan | BPA | 1 January 2024 | Incumbent | |
| Appointed | | | Rizwan Ullah | Independent | 1 January 2024 | Incumbent | |
| Appointed | | | Vivian Wong Man-lei | Independent | 1 January 2024 | Incumbent | |
| Appointed | | | Lai Yin-chung | Independent | 1 January 2024 | Incumbent | |

==== Wong Tai Sin ====
| Capacity | Code | Constituency | Name | Political affiliation | Term | | Notes |
|---|---|---|---|---|---|---|---|
| Elected | H01 | Wong Tai Sin East | Mabel Tam Mei-po | FTU | 1 January 2024 | Incumbent | |
| Elected | H01 | Wong Tai Sin East | Kyle Yuet Ngai-keung | DAB | 1 January 2024 | Incumbent | |
| Elected | H02 | Wong Tai Sin West | Poon Cheuk-bun | DAB | 1 January 2024 | Incumbent | |
| Elected | H02 | Wong Tai Sin West | Leo Yeung Nok-hin | Independent | 1 January 2024 | Incumbent | |
| District Committees | | | Yuen Kwok-keung | DAB | 1 January 2024 | Incumbent | |
| District Committees | | | Joe Lai Wing-ho | DAB | 1 January 2024 | Incumbent | |
| District Committees | | | Mok Kin-wing | FTU | 1 January 2024 | Incumbent | |
| District Committees | | | Leonard Chan Ying | Independent | 1 January 2024 | Incumbent | |
| District Committees | | | Fung Kin-lok | Independent | 1 January 2024 | Incumbent | |
| District Committees | | | Lui Kai-lin | Independent | 1 January 2024 | Incumbent | |
| District Committees | | | Lee Tung-kwong | Independent | 1 January 2024 | Incumbent | |
| District Committees | | | Andie Chan Wai-kwan | Independent | 1 January 2024 | Incumbent | |
| Appointed | | | Leung Tang-fung | DAB | 1 January 2024 | Incumbent | |
| Appointed | | | Anthony Yau Yiu-shing | FTU | 1 January 2024 | Incumbent | |
| Appointed | | | Janus Lau Yuen-yee | FLU | 1 January 2024 | Incumbent | |
| Appointed | | | Dennis Li | Independent | 1 January 2024 | Incumbent | |
| Appointed | | | Deannie Yew Yat-wa | Independent | 1 January 2024 | Incumbent | |
| Appointed | | | Edmond Hung Chor-ying | Independent | 1 January 2024 | Incumbent | |
| Appointed | | | Tang Man-wai | Independent | 1 January 2024 | Incumbent | |
| Appointed | | | Godfrey Ngai Shi-shing | Independent | 1 January 2024 | Incumbent | |

==== Kwun Tong ====
| Capacity | Code | Constituency | Name | Political affiliation | Term | | Notes |
|---|---|---|---|---|---|---|---|
| Elected | J01 | Kwun Tong Southeast | Pang Chi-sang | FPHE | 1 January 2024 | Incumbent | |
| Elected | J01 | Kwun Tong Southeast | Kan Ming-tung | FTU | 1 January 2024 | Incumbent | |
| Elected | J02 | Kwun Tong Central | Wilson Or Chong-shing | DAB | 1 January 2024 | Incumbent | |
| Elected | J02 | Kwun Tong Central | Marco Ma Yat-chiu | New Forum | 1 January 2024 | Incumbent | |
| Elected | J03 | Kwun Tong North | Cheung Pui-kong | DAB | 1 January 2024 | Incumbent | |
| Elected | J03 | Kwun Tong North | Fu Pik-chun | Independent | 1 January 2024 | Incumbent | |
| Elected | J04 | Kwun Tong West | Tam Siu-cheuk | DAB | 1 January 2024 | Incumbent | |
| Elected | J04 | Kwun Tong West | Tony Lee Ka-hang | FTU | 1 January 2024 | Incumbent | |
| District Committees | | | Cheung Yiu-pan | DAB | 1 January 2024 | Incumbent | |
| District Committees | | | Derek Tsang Wing-fai | DAB | 1 January 2024 | Incumbent | |
| District Committees | | | April Feng Yunsi | DAB | 1 January 2024 | Incumbent | |
| District Committees | | | Au Yeung Kwan-nok | DAB | 1 January 2024 | Incumbent | |
| District Committees | | | Ching Hoi-yan | FTU | 1 January 2024 | Incumbent | |
| District Committees | | | Wong Kai-san | FTU | 1 January 2024 | Incumbent | |
| District Committees | | | Cheng Keung-fung | FPHE | 1 January 2024 | Incumbent | |
| District Committees | | | Ng Ting-fung | Independent | 1 January 2024 | Incumbent | |
| District Committees | | | Sophia Lee Shuk-woon | Independent | 1 January 2024 | Incumbent | |
| District Committees | | | Yu Ka-ming | Independent | 1 January 2024 | Incumbent | |
| District Committees | | | Lam Fung | Independent | 1 January 2024 | Incumbent | |
| District Committees | | | Kam Kin | Independent | 1 January 2024 | Incumbent | |
| District Committees | | | Fong Yat-kwan | Independent | 1 January 2024 | Incumbent | |
| District Committees | | | Boe Zhan Bao-yu | Independent | 1 January 2024 | Incumbent | |
| District Committees | | | Tang Wing-chun | Independent | 1 January 2024 | Incumbent | |
| District Committees | | | Kwan Kin-wing | Independent | 1 January 2024 | Incumbent | |
| Appointed | | | Hung Kam-in | DAB | 1 January 2024 | Incumbent | |
| Appointed | | | Hsu Yau-wai | DAB | 1 January 2024 | Incumbent | |
| Appointed | | | Jack Cheung Ki-tang | DAB | 1 January 2024 | Incumbent | |
| Appointed | | | Juliana Yu | DAB | 1 January 2024 | Incumbent | |
| Appointed | | | Alan Yu Siu-lung | FTU/DAB | 1 January 2024 | Incumbent | |
| Appointed | | | Lui Tung-hai | FPHE | 1 January 2024 | Incumbent | |
| Appointed | | | Ng Si-wah | Independent | 1 January 2024 | Incumbent | |
| Appointed | | | Yu Man | Independent | 1 January 2024 | Incumbent | |
| Appointed | | | Lam Wai | Independent | 1 January 2024 | Incumbent | |
| Appointed | | | Renee Leung Sze-wan | Independent | 1 January 2024 | Incumbent | |
| Appointed | | | Lin Ho-man | Independent | 1 January 2024 | Incumbent | |
| Appointed | | | Jimmy Chan Yiu-hung | Independent | 1 January 2024 | Incumbent | |
| Appointed | | | Jackson Wong Chun-ping | Independent | 1 January 2024 | Incumbent | |
| Appointed | | | Lau Kar-wah | Independent | 1 January 2024 | Incumbent | |
| Appointed | | | Chu Lok-wai | Independent | 1 January 2024 | Incumbent | |
| Appointed | | | Lai Wing-chun | Independent | 1 January 2024 | Incumbent | |

=== New Territories ===
==== Tsuen Wan ====
| Capacity | Code | Constituency | Name | Political affiliation | Term | | Notes |
|---|---|---|---|---|---|---|---|
| Elected | K01 | Tsuen Wan Northwest | Kot Siu-yuen | FTU | 1 January 2024 | Incumbent | |
| Elected | K01 | Tsuen Wan Northwest | Matthew Wong Kai-chun | DAB | 1 January 2024 | Incumbent | |
| Elected | K02 | Tsuen Wan Southeast | Ng Chun-yu | DAB | 1 January 2024 | Incumbent | |
| Elected | K02 | Tsuen Wan Southeast | Sam Fung Cheuk-sam | FPHE | 1 January 2024 | Incumbent | |
| District Committees | | | Tsang Tai | DAB | 1 January 2024 | Incumbent | |
| District Committees | | | Jones Chan Chun-chung | DAB | 1 January 2024 | Incumbent | |
| District Committees | | | Marco Chow Sum-ming | DAB | 1 January 2024 | Incumbent | |
| District Committees | | | Lau Chung-kong | DAB | 1 January 2024 | Incumbent | |
| District Committees | | | Marcus Mok Yuen-kwan | Independent | 1 January 2024 | Incumbent | |
| District Committees | | | Wyran Cheng Chit-pun | Independent | 1 January 2024 | Incumbent | |
| District Committees | | | Chu Tak-wing | Independent | 1 January 2024 | Incumbent | |
| District Committees | | | Lam Yuen-pun | Independent | 1 January 2024 | Incumbent | |
| Appointed | | | Koo Yeung-pong | DAB | 1 January 2024 | Incumbent | |
| Appointed | | | Marcella Cheung Man-ka | NPP | 1 January 2024 | Incumbent | |
| Appointed | | | Luparker Wong Shuk-fan | Independent | 1 January 2024 | Incumbent | |
| Appointed | | | Raymond Leung Cheong-ming | Independent | 1 January 2024 | Incumbent | |
| Appointed | | | Chan Shun-shun | Independent | 1 January 2024 | Incumbent | |
| Appointed | | | Chan Hiu-chun | Independent | 1 January 2024 | Incumbent | |
| Appointed | | | Wah Mei-ling | Independent | 1 January 2024 | Incumbent | |
| Appointed | | | Wong Wai-kit | Independent | 1 January 2024 | Incumbent | |
| Ex Officio | | Ma Wan Rural Committee Chairman | Chan Sung-ip | Independent | 1 January 2024 | Incumbent | |
| Ex Officio | | Tsuen Wan Rural Committee Chairman | Yau Kam-ping | Independent | 1 January 2024 | Incumbent | |

==== Tuen Mun ====
| Capacity | Code | Constituency | Name | Political affiliation | Term | | Notes |
|---|---|---|---|---|---|---|---|
| Elected | L01 | Tuen Mun East | Ken Fung Pui-yin | FTU | 1 January 2024 | Incumbent | |
| Elected | L01 | Tuen Mun East | Terry Yip Man-pan | DAB | 1 January 2024 | Incumbent | |
| Elected | L02 | Tuen Mun West | Chung Kin-fung | DAB | 1 January 2024 | Incumbent | |
| Elected | L02 | Tuen Mun West | Simon Tsui Fang | FTU | 1 January 2024 | Incumbent | |
| Elected | L03 | Tuen Mun North | Apple Lai Ka-man | DAB/NTAS | 1 January 2024 | Incumbent | |
| Elected | L03 | Tuen Mun North | So Ka-man | NPP | 1 January 2024 | Incumbent | |
| District Committees | | | Tsang Hin-hong | DAB | 1 January 2024 | Incumbent | |
| District Committees | | | Ching Chi-hung | DAB | 1 January 2024 | Incumbent | |
| District Committees | | | Chan Tsim-heng | DAB | 1 January 2024 | Incumbent | |
| District Committees | | | Johnny Ip Chun-yuen | DAB | 1 January 2024 | Incumbent | |
| District Committees | | | Jason Tsoi Shing-hin | DAB | 1 January 2024 | Incumbent | |
| District Committees | | | Leo Chan Manwell | FTU | 1 January 2024 | Incumbent | |
| District Committees | | | Kam Man-fung | NPP | 1 January 2024 | Incumbent | |
| District Committees | | | Victor Kwong Man-tik | NPP | 1 January 2024 | Incumbent | |
| District Committees | | | Stephen Chui King-hang | Independent | 1 January 2024 | Incumbent | |
| District Committees | | | Tse Yuk-ling | Independent | 1 January 2024 | Incumbent | |
| District Committees | | | Lam Tik-fai | Independent | 1 January 2024 | Incumbent | |
| District Committees | | | Li Chiu-hung | Independent | 1 January 2024 | Incumbent | |
| Appointed | | | Benton Ho Jun-hang | Independent | 1 January 2024 | Incumbent | |
| Appointed | | | Rex Mo Shing-fung | DAB | 1 January 2024 | Incumbent | |
| Appointed | | | Tony Chan Yau-hoi | FTU | 1 January 2024 | Incumbent | |
| Appointed | | | Fung Yuk-fung | FTU | 1 January 2024 | Incumbent | |
| Appointed | | | Chan Mang-yi | Independent | 1 January 2024 | Incumbent | |
| Appointed | | | Mac Chan Ho-ting | Independent | 1 January 2024 | Incumbent | |
| Appointed | | | Jeff Chan Kwai-wao | Independent | 1 January 2024 | Incumbent | |
| Appointed | | | Pamela Mak Mei-yee | Independent | 1 January 2024 | Incumbent | |
| Appointed | | | Kurt Tsang Hing-chung | Independent | 1 January 2024 | Incumbent | |
| Appointed | | | Wan Tin-chong | Independent | 1 January 2024 | Incumbent | |
| Appointed | | | Kenneth Yip Kat-kong | Independent | 1 January 2024 | Incumbent | Suspended for one week in September 2025 |
| Appointed | | | Andy Cheng Yin-kwan | Independent | 1 January 2024 | Incumbent | |
| Appointed | | | Steve Tse Wing-hang | Independent | 1 January 2024 | Incumbent | |
| Ex Officio | | Tuen Mun Rural Committee Chairman | Kenneth Lau Ip-keung | BPA | 1 January 2024 | Incumbent | |

==== Yuen Long ====
| Capacity | Code | Constituency | Name | Political affiliation | Term | | Notes |
|---|---|---|---|---|---|---|---|
| Elected | M01 | Yuen Long Town Centre | Riben Li Kai-lap | DAB | 1 January 2024 | Incumbent | |
| Elected | M01 | Yuen Long Town Centre | Sei Chun-hing | Independent | 1 January 2024 | Incumbent | |
| Elected | M02 | Yuen Long Rural East | Leung Min-kin | Independent | 1 January 2024 | Incumbent | |
| Elected | M02 | Yuen Long Rural East | Chui Kwan-siu | DAB | 1 January 2024 | Incumbent | |
| Elected | M03 | Tin Shui Wai South and Ping Ha | Terry So Yuen | DAB | 1 January 2024 | Incumbent | |
| Elected | M03 | Tin Shui Wai South and Ping Ha | Yankie Chan Kin-yang | Independent | 1 January 2024 | Incumbent | |
| Elected | M04 | Tin Shui Wai North | Yiu Kwok-wai | FTU | 1 January 2024 | Incumbent | |
| Elected | M04 | Tin Shui Wai North | Fennie Lai Yuet-kwan | DAB | 1 January 2024 | Incumbent | |
| District Committees | | | Tom Tong Tak-chun | DAB | 1 January 2024 | Incumbent | |
| District Committees | | | Leung Yip-pang | DAB | 1 January 2024 | Incumbent | |
| District Committees | | | Ma Shuk-yin | DAB | 1 January 2024 | Incumbent | |
| District Committees | | | Lam Wai-ming | DAB | 1 January 2024 | Incumbent | |
| District Committees | | | Calvin Sze To Chun-hin | DAB | 1 January 2024 | Incumbent | |
| District Committees | | | Lau Kwai-yung | FTU | 1 January 2024 | Incumbent | |
| District Committees | | | Lam Wai-ming | Independent | 1 January 2024 | Incumbent | |
| District Committees | | | Amy Yuen Man-yee | Independent | 1 January 2024 | Incumbent | |
| District Committees | | | Man Yick-yeung | Independent | 1 January 2024 | Incumbent | |
| District Committees | | | Lam Chung-yin | Independent | 1 January 2024 | Incumbent | |
| District Committees | | | Wong Shiu-chung | Independent | 1 January 2024 | Incumbent | |
| District Committees | | | Ricky Tsui Wai-ngoi | Independent | 1 January 2024 | Incumbent | |
| District Committees | | | Wong Yuen-tai | Independent | 1 January 2024 | Incumbent | |
| District Committees | | | Lucy Ho Hiu-man | Independent | 1 January 2024 | Incumbent | |
| District Committees | | | Ronnie Tang Yung-yiu | Independent | 1 January 2024 | Incumbent | |
| District Committees | | | Li Ching-yee | Independent | 1 January 2024 | Incumbent | |
| Appointed | | | Yu Chung-leung | DAB | 1 January 2024 | Incumbent | |
| Appointed | | | Lui Kin | DAB | 1 January 2024 | Incumbent | |
| Appointed | | | Weelie Wong Wai-ling | DAB | 1 January 2024 | Incumbent | |
| Appointed | | | Wong Hiu-shan | FTU | 1 January 2024 | Incumbent | |
| Appointed | | | Chong Kin-shing | BPA | 1 January 2024 | Incumbent | |
| Appointed | | | Allan Wong Wing-ho | PoD | 1 January 2024 | Incumbent | |
| Appointed | | | Wilson Shum Ho-kit | Independent | 1 January 2024 | Incumbent | |
| Appointed | | | Donald Man Ka-ho | Independent | 1 January 2024 | Incumbent | |
| Appointed | | | Desmond Wong Wai-leung | Independent | 1 January 2024 | Incumbent | |
| Appointed | | | Lam Tim-fook | Independent | 1 January 2024 | Incumbent | |
| Appointed | | | Cheung Wai-sum | Independent | 1 January 2024 | Incumbent | |
| Appointed | | | Chan Ka-fai | Independent | 1 January 2024 | Incumbent | |
| Appointed | | | Daniel Cham Ka-hung | Independent | 1 January 2024 | Incumbent | |
| Appointed | | | Frankie Fung Chun-wing | Independent | 1 January 2024 | Incumbent | |
| Appointed | | | Chiu Sau-han | Independent | 1 January 2024 | Incumbent | |
| Appointed | | | Tam Tak-hoi | Independent | 1 January 2024 | Incumbent | |
| Ex officio | | Shap Pat Heung Rural Committee Chairman | Ching Chan-ming | Independent | 1 January 2024 | Incumbent | |
| Ex officio | | San Tin Rural Committee Chairman | Man Luk-shing | Independent | 1 January 2024 | Incumbent | |
| Ex officio | | Ha Tsuen Rural Committee Chairman | Tang Sin-hang | Independent | 1 January 2024 | Incumbent | |
| Ex officio | | Kam Tin Rural Committee Chairman | Tang Ho-lin | Independent | 1 January 2024 | Incumbent | |
| Ex officio | | Ping Shan Rural Committee Chairman | Tang Che-keung | Independent | 1 January 2024 | Incumbent | |
| Ex officio | | Pat Heung Rural Committee Chairman | Alan Kwok Wing-cheong | Independent | 1 January 2024 | 2 August 2025 | Died in office |
| Ex officio | | Pat Heung Rural Committee Chairman | Tang Chi-kwong | Independent | November 2025 | Incumbent | |

==== North ====
| Capacity | Code | Constituency | Name | Political affiliation | Term | | Notes |
|---|---|---|---|---|---|---|---|
| Elected | N01 | Wu Tip Shan | Yiu Ming | DAB | 1 January 2024 | Incumbent | |
| Elected | N01 | Wu Tip Shan | Sung Ping-ping | Independent | 1 January 2024 | Incumbent | |
| Elected | N02 | Robin's Nest | Ko Wai-kei | DAB | 1 January 2024 | Incumbent | |
| Elected | N02 | Robin's Nest | Ken Tsang King-chung | FTU | 1 January 2024 | Incumbent | |
| District Committees | | | Lau Chun-hoi | DAB | 1 January 2024 | Incumbent | |
| District Committees | | | Sherwood Ng Yiu-cho | DAB | 1 January 2024 | Incumbent | |
| District Committees | | | Ray Hau Hon-shek | DAB | 1 January 2024 | Incumbent | |
| District Committees | | | Wu King-pang | DAB | 1 January 2024 | Incumbent | |
| District Committees | | | Phillip Tsang Hing-lung | DAB | 1 January 2024 | Incumbent | |
| District Committees | | | Pun Hau-man | DAB | 1 January 2024 | Incumbent | |
| District Committees | | | Windy Or Sin-yi | DAB | 1 January 2024 | Incumbent | |
| District Committees | | | Warwick Wan Wo-tat | Independent | 1 January 2024 | Incumbent | |
| Appointed | | | Chu Ho-yin | DAB | 1 January 2024 | Incumbent | |
| Appointed | | | Wan Wo-fai | DAB | 1 January 2024 | Incumbent | |
| Appointed | | | Lai Sum | DAB | 1 January 2024 | Incumbent | |
| Appointed | | | Zinnie Chow Tin-yi | BPA | 1 January 2024 | Incumbent | |
| Appointed | | | Chu Wai-lam | FEW | 1 January 2024 | Incumbent | |
| Appointed | | | Tommy Hung Chi-fu | Independent | 1 January 2024 | Incumbent | |
| Appointed | | | Henry Liu Yu-hin | Independent | 1 January 2024 | Incumbent | |
| Appointed | | | Tam Chun-kwok | Independent | 1 January 2024 | Incumbent | |
| Ex officio | | Ta Kwu Ling Rural Committee Chairman | Chan Yuet-ming | Independent | 1 January 2024 | Incumbent | |
| Ex officio | | Sheung Shui Rural Committee Chairman | Hau Chi-keung | Independent | 1 January 2024 | Incumbent | |
| Ex officio | | Sha Tau Kok Rural Committee Chairman | Lee Koon-hung | Independent | 1 January 2024 | Incumbent | |
| Ex officio | | Fanling Rural Committee Chairman | Li Kwok-fung | Independent | 1 January 2024 | Incumbent | |

==== Tai Po ====
| Capacity | Code | Constituency | Name | Political affiliation | Term | | Notes |
|---|---|---|---|---|---|---|---|
| Elected | P01 | Tai Po South | Peggy Wong Pik-kiu | DAB | 1 January 2024 | Incumbent | |
| Elected | P01 | Tai Po South | Lo Hiu-fung | BPA | 1 January 2024 | Incumbent | |
| Elected | P02 | Tai Po North | Wu Cheuk-him | DAB | 1 January 2024 | Incumbent | |
| Elected | P02 | Tai Po North | Lok Siu-luen | Independent | 1 January 2024 | Incumbent | |
| District Committees | | | Lee Man-kit | DAB | 1 January 2024 | Incumbent | |
| District Committees | | | Barry Mui Siu-fung | DAB | 1 January 2024 | Incumbent | |
| District Committees | | | Wong Wai-tung | DAB | 1 January 2024 | Incumbent | |
| District Committees | | | Kitty Chan Kin-kwan | NPP | 1 January 2024 | Incumbent | |
| District Committees | | | Rex Li Wah-kwong | BPA | 1 January 2024 | Incumbent | |
| District Committees | | | Gary Mak Shing-ho | Independent | 1 January 2024 | Incumbent | |
| District Committees | | | Chan Siu-kuen | Independent | 1 January 2024 | Incumbent | |
| District Committees | | | Ken Yu Chi-wing | Independent | 1 January 2024 | Incumbent | |
| Appointed | | | Chan Pok-chi | DAB | 1 January 2024 | Incumbent | |
| Appointed | | | Chan Yung-wa | FTU | 1 January 2024 | Incumbent | |
| Appointed | | | Chan Cho-leung | BPA | 1 January 2024 | Incumbent | |
| Appointed | | | Jeanne Lee Sai-yin | Independent | 1 January 2024 | Incumbent | |
| Appointed | | | Lee Hon-cheung | Independent | 1 January 2024 | Incumbent | |
| Appointed | | | Mui Ching-hung | Independent | 1 January 2024 | Incumbent | |
| Appointed | | | Chan Tsz-kin | Independent | 1 January 2024 | Incumbent | |
| Appointed | | | Johnny Wan Koon-kau | Independent | 1 January 2024 | Incumbent | |
| Ex Officio | | Tai Po Rural Committee Chairman | Lam Yick-kuen | Independent | 1 January 2024 | Incumbent | |
| Ex Officio | | Sai Kung North Rural Committee Chairman | Li Yiu-ban | Independent | 1 January 2024 | Incumbent | |

==== Sai Kung ====
| Capacity | Code | Constituency | Name | Political affiliation | Term | | Notes |
|---|---|---|---|---|---|---|---|
| Elected | Q01 | Sai Kung and Hang Hau | Christine Fong Kwok-shan | PP | 1 January 2024 | Incumbent | |
| Elected | Q01 | Sai Kung and Hang Hau | Yau Ho-lun | DAB | 1 January 2024 | Incumbent | |
| Elected | Q02 | Tseung Kwan O South | Amber Sze Pan-pan | DAB | 1 January 2024 | Incumbent | |
| Elected | Q02 | Tseung Kwan O South | James Wong Yuen-ho | FTU | 1 January 2024 | Incumbent | |
| Elected | Q03 | Tseung Kwan O North | Edwin Wan Kai-ming | DAB | 1 January 2024 | Incumbent | |
| Elected | Q03 | Tseung Kwan O North | Victor Chan Chi-ho | NPP/CF | 1 January 2024 | Incumbent | |
| District Committees | | | Philip Li Ka-leung | DAB | 1 January 2024 | Incumbent | |
| District Committees | | | Kan Tung-tung | DAB | 1 January 2024 | Incumbent | |
| District Committees | | | Chau Ka-lok | DAB | 1 January 2024 | Incumbent | |
| District Committees | | | Cheng Yu-hei | FTU | 1 January 2024 | Incumbent | |
| District Committees | | | Ken Chan Kin-chun | NPP/CF | 1 January 2024 | Incumbent | |
| District Committees | | | Tam Chuk-kwan | NPP/CF | 1 January 2024 | Incumbent | |
| District Committees | | | Chan Kwong-fai | TKODFG | 1 January 2024 | Incumbent | |
| District Committees | | | Chapman Chan Kai-wai | Independent | 1 January 2024 | Incumbent | |
| District Committees | | | Li Tin-chi | Independent | 1 January 2024 | Incumbent | |
| District Committees | | | Chris Cheung Mei-hung | Independent | 1 January 2024 | Incumbent | |
| District Committees | | | Cheung Chin-pang | Independent | 1 January 2024 | Incumbent | |
| District Committees | | | Tsang Kwok-ka | Independent | 1 January 2024 | Incumbent | |
| Appointed | | | Ki Lai-mei | DAB | 1 January 2024 | Incumbent | |
| Appointed | | | Chong Yuen-tung | DAB | 1 January 2024 | Incumbent | |
| Appointed | | | Angel Chong Nga-ting | DAB | 1 January 2024 | Incumbent | |
| Appointed | | | Chan Kuen-kwan | DAB | 1 January 2024 | Incumbent | |
| Appointed | | | Lam Chun-ka | Liberal | 1 January 2024 | Incumbent | |
| Appointed | | | Wong Wang-to | FTU | 1 January 2024 | Incumbent | |
| Appointed | | | Wang Wen | Independent | 1 January 2024 | Incumbent | |
| Appointed | | | Ellen Li Ka-yan | Independent | 1 January 2024 | Incumbent | |
| Appointed | | | Kelvin Yau Siu-hung | Independent | 1 January 2024 | Incumbent | |
| Appointed | | | Natasha Yu | Independent | 1 January 2024 | Incumbent | |
| Appointed | | | Wu Suet-ling | Independent | 1 January 2024 | Incumbent | |
| Appointed | | | Cheung Man-tim | Independent | 1 January 2024 | Incumbent | |
| Ex Officio | | Hang Hau Rural Committee Chairman | Lau Kai-hong | Independent | 1 January 2024 | Incumbent | |
| Ex Officio | | Sai Kung Rural Committee Chairman | Wong Shui-sang | Independent | 1 January 2024 | Incumbent | |

==== Sha Tin ====
| Capacity | Code | Constituency | Name | Political affiliation | Term | | Notes |
|---|---|---|---|---|---|---|---|
| Elected | R01 | Sha Tin West | Chan Tan-tan | DAB | 1 January 2024 | Incumbent | |
| Elected | R01 | Sha Tin West | Calvin Tang Siu-fung | Independent | 1 January 2024 | Incumbent | |
| Elected | R02 | Sha Tin East | Yiu Ka-chun | NPP/CF | 1 January 2024 | Incumbent | |
| Elected | R02 | Sha Tin East | Chu Wun-chiu | DAB | 1 January 2024 | Incumbent | |
| Elected | R03 | Sha Tin South | Eddie Lam Yu-shing | NPP/CF | 1 January 2024 | Incumbent | |
| Elected | R03 | Sha Tin South | Koo Wai-ping | FTU | 1 January 2024 | Incumbent | |
| Elected | R04 | Sha Tin North | Choi Wai-shing | DAB | 1 January 2024 | Incumbent | |
| Elected | R04 | Sha Tin North | Anna Law Yi-lam | NPP/CF | 1 January 2024 | Incumbent | |
| District Committees | | | Maisy Kung Mei-chi | DAB | 1 January 2024 | Incumbent | |
| District Committees | | | Ronald Yeung Ying-hon | DAB | 1 January 2024 | Incumbent | |
| District Committees | | | Ng Kai-tai | DAB | 1 January 2024 | Incumbent | |
| District Committees | | | Mok Hei-man | DAB | 1 January 2024 | Incumbent | |
| District Committees | | | Janet Lee Ching-yee | FTU | 1 January 2024 | Incumbent | |
| District Committees | | | Leung Ka-wai | NPP/CF | 1 January 2024 | Incumbent | |
| District Committees | | | Cheung Pak-yuen | NPP/CF | 1 January 2024 | Incumbent | |
| District Committees | | | Ha Kim-kwan | NPP/CF | 1 January 2024 | Incumbent | |
| District Committees | | | Celine Lam Yuk-wa | Independent | 1 January 2024 | Incumbent | |
| District Committees | | | Maverick Leung Chun-pong | Independent | 1 January 2024 | Incumbent | |
| District Committees | | | Chan Hiu-ying | Independent | 1 January 2024 | Incumbent | |
| District Committees | | | Karen Law Yuen-pui | Independent | 1 January 2024 | Incumbent | |
| District Committees | | | Guo Xuantong | Independent | 1 January 2024 | Incumbent | |
| District Committees | | | Jeff Lau Tak-wing | Independent | 1 January 2024 | Incumbent | |
| District Committees | | | Lam Siu-man | Independent | 1 January 2024 | Incumbent | |
| District Committees | | | Ada Lo Tai-suen | Independent | 1 January 2024 | Incumbent | |
| Appointed | | | Kelly Tung King-lei | DAB | 1 January 2024 | Incumbent | |
| Appointed | | | Roy Lam Kwong-kwan | DAB | 1 January 2024 | Incumbent | |
| Appointed | | | Chan Sin-ming | FTU | 1 January 2024 | Incumbent | |
| Appointed | | | Vincent Wong Wai-shin | NPP | 1 January 2024 | Incumbent | |
| Appointed | | | Leung Ka-fai | NPP/CF | 1 January 2024 | Incumbent | |
| Appointed | | | Chan Man-kuen | NPP/CF | 1 January 2024 | Incumbent | |
| Appointed | | | Michael Liu Tsz-chung | NPP/CF | 1 January 2024 | Incumbent | |
| Appointed | | | Pun Kwok-shan | NPP/CF | 1 January 2024 | Incumbent | |
| Appointed | | | Nancy Lam Chung-yan | Civil Force | 1 January 2024 | Incumbent | |
| Appointed | | | Michael Wong Yue-hon | Civil Force | 1 January 2024 | Incumbent | |
| Appointed | | | Paul Au Chi-on | Independent | 1 January 2024 | Incumbent | |
| Appointed | | | Wong King | Independent | 1 January 2024 | Incumbent | |
| Appointed | | | Wong Po-yee | Independent | 1 January 2024 | Incumbent | |
| Appointed | | | Tsoi Ming-yang | Independent | 1 January 2024 | Incumbent | |
| Appointed | | | Deng Kairong | Independent | 1 January 2024 | Incumbent | |
| Appointed | | | Cheng Ka-ho | Independent | 1 January 2024 | Incumbent | |
| Appointed | | | Scarlett Pong Oi-lan | Independent | 1 January 2024 | Incumbent | |
| Ex Officio | | Sha Tin Rural Committee Chairman | Mok Kam-kwai | BPA | 1 January 2024 | Incumbent | |

==== Kwai Tsing ====
| Capacity | Code | Constituency | Name | Political affiliation | Term | | Notes |
|---|---|---|---|---|---|---|---|
| Elected | S01 | Tsing Yi | Lo Yuen-ting | DAB | 1 January 2024 | Incumbent | |
| Elected | S01 | Tsing Yi | Pang Yap-ming | FTU | 1 January 2024 | Incumbent | |
| Elected | S02 | Kwai Tsing East | Jody Kwok Fu-yung | DAB | 1 January 2024 | Incumbent | |
| Elected | S02 | Kwai Tsing East | Chau Kit-ying | FTU | 1 January 2024 | Incumbent | |
| Elected | S03 | Kwai Tsing West | Chan On-ni | FTU | 1 January 2024 | Incumbent | |
| Elected | S03 | Kwai Tsing West | Wong Chun-yeung | DAB | 1 January 2024 | Incumbent | |
| District Committees | | | Ng Kin-wah | DAB | 1 January 2024 | Incumbent | |
| District Committees | | | Tang Lai-ling | DAB | 1 January 2024 | Incumbent | |
| District Committees | | | Lam Ying-wai | DAB | 1 January 2024 | Incumbent | |
| District Committees | | | Yuen Yun-hung | DAB | 1 January 2024 | Incumbent | |
| District Committees | | | Wong Shuk-man | DAB | 1 January 2024 | Incumbent | |
| District Committees | | | Benny Ng Yam-fung | DAB | 1 January 2024 | Incumbent | |
| District Committees | | | Ng Chi-wah | DAB | 1 January 2024 | Incumbent | |
| District Committees | | | Wong Siu-kwan | DAB | 1 January 2024 | Incumbent | |
| District Committees | | | Lee Wai-lok | FTU | 1 January 2024 | Incumbent | |
| District Committees | | | Ariel Mok Yee-ki | BPA | 1 January 2024 | Incumbent | |
| District Committees | | | James Lau Hing-wah | Independent | 1 January 2024 | Incumbent | |
| District Committees | | | Guo Huimin | Independent | 1 January 2024 | Incumbent | |
| Appointed | | | Chu Lai-ling | DAB | 1 January 2024 | Incumbent | |
| Appointed | | | Leung Kar-ming | DAB | 1 January 2024 | Incumbent | |
| Appointed | | | Poon Chi-sing | DAB | 1 January 2024 | Incumbent | |
| Appointed | | | Lau Mei-lo | FTU | 1 January 2024 | Incumbent | |
| Appointed | | | Au Chi-fai | FTU | 1 January 2024 | Incumbent | |
| Appointed | | | So Pak-tsan | FTU | 1 January 2024 | Incumbent | |
| Appointed | | | Wang Chung-wing | Independent | 1 January 2024 | Incumbent | |
| Appointed | | | Chow Kim-ho | Independent | 1 January 2024 | Incumbent | |
| Appointed | | | Lam Chui-ling | Independent | 1 January 2024 | Incumbent | |
| Appointed | | | Jonathan Tsui Hui-kit | Independent | 1 January 2024 | Incumbent | |
| Appointed | | | Chan Oi-yi | Independent | 1 January 2024 | Incumbent | |
| Appointed | | | Yip Cheung-chun | Independent | 1 January 2024 | Incumbent | |
| Appointed | | | Cheng Lam | Independent | 1 January 2024 | Incumbent | |
| Ex Officio | | Tsing Yi Rural Committee Chairman | Chan Chi-wing | Independent | 1 January 2024 | Incumbent | |

==== Islands ====
| Capacity | Code | Constituency | Name | Political affiliation | Term | | Notes |
|---|---|---|---|---|---|---|---|
| Elected | T01 | Islands | Yip Pui-kei | DAB | 1 January 2024 | Incumbent | |
| Elected | T01 | Islands | Lau Chin-pang | FTU | 1 January 2024 | Incumbent | |
| District Committees | | | Mealoha Kwok Wai-man | DAB | 1 January 2024 | Incumbent | |
| District Committees | | | Lau Shun-ting | DAB | 1 January 2024 | Incumbent | |
| District Committees | | | Luo Chenghuan | Independent | 1 January 2024 | Incumbent | |
| District Committees | | | Jonathan Chow Yuen-kuk | Independent | 1 January 2024 | Incumbent | |
| Appointed | | | Randy Yu Hon-kwan | Independent | 1 January 2024 | Incumbent | |
| Appointed | | | Ng Choi-wah | Independent | 1 January 2024 | Incumbent | |
| Appointed | | | Lau Shun-ting | Independent | 1 January 2024 | Incumbent | |
| Appointed | | | Lau Shuk-han | Independent | 1 January 2024 | Incumbent | |
| Ex Officio | | Peng Chau Rural Committee Chairman | Wong Hon-kuen | Independent | 1 January 2024 | Incumbent | |
| Ex Officio | | Lamma North Rural Committee Chairman | Chan Lin-wai | Independent | 1 January 2024 | Incumbent | |
| Ex Officio | | Tung Chung Rural Committee Chairman | Wong Chau-ping | Independent | 1 January 2024 | Incumbent | |
| Ex Officio | | Lamma South Rural Committee Chairman | Chow Yuk-tong | Independent | 1 January 2024 | 28 September 2025 | Longest serving councillor (in office for 43 years); Died in office |
| Ex Officio | | Tai O Rural Committee Chairman | Ho Siu-kei | Independent | 1 January 2024 | Incumbent | |
| Ex Officio | | Lantau South Rural Committee Chairman | Ho Chun-fai | Independent | 1 January 2024 | Incumbent | |
| Ex Officio | | Mui Wo Rural Committee Chairman | Wong Man-hon | Independent | 1 January 2024 | Incumbent | |
| Ex Officio | | Cheung Chau Rural Committee Chairman | Yung Chi-ming | Independent | 1 January 2024 | Incumbent | |

== See also ==
- 2023 Hong Kong electoral changes
- 2023 Hong Kong local elections
- District Officer (Hong Kong)
