= Allan Wong =

Hong Kong politician (born 1980)

Allan Wong Wing-ho
- 黃頴灝

Member of the Yuen Long District Council
- Incumbent
- Assumed office 1 January 2024
- Constituency: Appointed

Personal details
- Born: Wong Wing-ho; 1980 (age 45–46) British Hong Kong
- Party: Path of Democracy (since 2018)
- Children: 2
- Education: University of Hong Kong, HKUST

Allan Wong Wing-ho(Chinese: 黃頴灝, born 1980) is a Hong Kong politician who is a current appointed member of the Yuen Long District Council and Co-Convenor of Path of Democracy, a centrist think tank.

== Early life and education ==
Allan Wong Wing-ho was born in 1980 and attended Yuen Long Merchants Association Secondary School in his early years. He graduated from the University of Hong Kong with a Bachelor in Computer Engineering and a Master of Business Administration from the Hong Kong University of Science and Technology.

== Career ==
After graduating from HKU, he worked as an information technology teacher at Leung Sing Tak College for 2 years. He joined Path of Democracy in 2018 and ran in the 2019 District Council election for Fairview Park, where he lost with 195 votes. In the 2021 Legislative Council election, he ran as a candidate for New Territories North East but lost with 5,160 votes. In 2023 he became the Co-Convenor of Path of Democracy, handling Internal and District affairs and on 12 December 2023, he was appointed a member of the Yuen Long District Council for the 7th District Council. In the 2025 Legislative Council election, he ran again as a candidate New Territories North East and lost with 11,951 votes.

== Personal life ==
Wong is married with 2 children, 1 son and 1 daughter.

== See also ==
- PoD Research Institute
- Ronny Tong
- Third Side
