= Liberalism in Hong Kong =

Liberalism in Hong Kong has become the driving force of the democratic movement since the 1980s which is mainly represented by the pro-democracy camp which strives for the universal suffrage, human rights and rule of law in Hong Kong. It is one of two major political ideologies of the Hong Kong, with the other being conservatism.

The emergence of the contemporary liberalism took root in the rapid democratisation in the final years of the colonial years in the 1980s and 1990s, which the pro-democracy camp was united under the banner of an autonomous Hong Kong under Chinese sovereignty. The liberals consolidated their popular support from the 1989 Tiananmen Square protests and massacre and received landslide victories in the first direct elections in 1991 and 1995 in the final colonial years. The liberals took the defensive role against the Beijing's authoritarian regime going into the early SAR period which led to the massive demonstration against the Basic Law Article 23 in 2003.

The liberals suffered from internal crises and fragmentation over the approaches on fighting for full democracy and safeguarding Hong Kong's liberal values against Beijing's increasing encroachment on Hong Kong's autonomy, which led to the rise of localism in the 2010s. The large-scale civil disobedience movement of Occupy Central in 2014 and the historic anti-government protests in 2019 resulted in Beijing's heavy-handed crackdown and subsequent retaliation, which put the liberal movement into limbo.

Historically, liberalism has a long tradition as an economic philosophy since the founding of Hong Kong as an entrepôt which cherishes private property, the free market, and free trade. Since Hong Kong was established as a free trading port by Britain in 1841, it has been strongly influenced by the laissez-faire ideals throughout its history. However, as a largely racially segregated and politically closed colony, attempts at liberal reform received little success in the 19th century. Nevertheless, many western-educated Chinese intellectuals based in Hong Kong became the some of most prominent liberal thinkers which pushed for modernisation of China, including Ho Kai and revolutionaries such as Yeung Ku-wan and Sun Yat-sen. During the early post-war period, a small scale self-government movement had also derived from Governor Mark Aitchison Young's proposed constitutional reform.

== Liberal roots in the 19th to early 20th century ==
=== Laissez-faire liberalism ===
The cession of Hong Kong under the Treaty of Nanking in 1842 was overseen by then-British Foreign Secretary Lord Palmerston who demanded a commercial treaty that would put Sino-British trade relations on a satisfactory footing or the cession of a small island where the British opium traders could live under their own flag free from threats from the Chinese officials in Canton. Lord Palmerston was a prime figure of the Whig Party, which was the predecessor of the Liberal Party. The aims of the Opium War was to open up the Chinese market in the name of free trade. As the British free port of Hong Kong, taking advantage as the gateway to the vast Chinese market, Hong Kong merchants, the so-called compradors, had taken a leading role in investment and trading opportunities by serving as middlemen between the European and indigenous population in China and Hong Kong, in the principles of laissez-faire classical liberalism, which has since dominated the economic discourse of Hong Kong.

Sir John Bowring, the Governor of Hong Kong from 1854 to 1859 and a disciple of liberal philosopher Jeremy Bentham for instance was a chief campaigner of free trade at the time. He believed that "Jesus Christ is free trade and free trade is Jesus Christ." In 1858, Bowring proudly claimed that "Hong Kong presents another example of elasticity and potency of unrestricted commerce."

The free market tradition lasted throughout Hong Kong history, and the city was rated the world's freest economy for 25 years, from 1995 to 2020, a title bestowed on it by The Heritage Foundation, a conservative Washington think tank, and was greatly admired by libertarian economist Milton Friedman.

=== Political liberalism ===
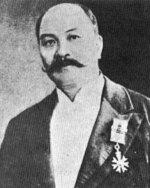
Ho Kai, a Chinese reformist politician who was inspired by western liberal ideas

Compared to economic liberalism, political liberalism remained marginal in Hong Kong and did not gain much political influence. However, as the debate over Chinese modernisation got fiercer by the end of the 20th century, Hong Kong became the home of Chinese reformists and revolutionaries, namely Sir Ho Kai, who was inspired by classical liberal thinkers such as John Locke, Montesquieu, Adam Smith, Jeremy Bentham and John Stuart Mill. He was an advocate of constitutional monarchy in China and a sympathiser of the revolutionary cause, along with his protégé, Dr. Sun Yat-sen, who had studied in Hong Kong and had stated that he got the inspiration for his revolutionary and modernist ideas from Hong Kong.

One of the earliest revolutionary organisations, the Furen Literary Society, was set up in Hong Kong by Yeung Ku-wan in 1892. The society met in Pak Tsz Lane, in Central, Hong Kong, and released books and papers discussing the future of China and advocating the overthrow of the Qing dynasty and the establishment of a democratic republic in China, priding themselves on the motto of "full-hearted patriotism" and striving for knowledge, inquiry and public awareness. The society was later merged into the Revive China Society secretly founded by Sun Yat-sen in 1894.

There were very few liberal reforms carried out by the colonial government towards the end of the 19th century. For instance, Sir John Bowring proposed that the elections to the Legislative Council should be based on property and not racial qualification. He believed that voting rights for the Chinese would "earn their support for the British government", which was strongly opposed by the local European community and the Colonial Office.

Sir John Pope Hennessy, the Governor of Hong Kong from 1877 to 1893, was a liberal-minded governor who attempted to tackle the problem of racial segregation in the colony, but had received stiff resistance within the colonial establishment for his radical agenda. Hennessy also proposed to abolish flogging as a form of punishment, which received widespread opposition from the European community, who even held a public protest meeting against his proposal.

There were sporadic voices for political liberalisation in Hong Kong during the late 19th and early 20th century. One of the examples was the Constitutional Reform Association of Hong Kong, which was formed by the expatriate British business community in 1917. Headed by Henry Pollock and P. H. Holyoak, it submitted a proposal of introducing unofficial majority within the Legislative Council to the House of Commons of the United Kingdom, represented by member of parliament Colonel John Ward, but the proposal was ultimately rejected by the Colonial Office. Failing to obtain any meaningful success for their proposals, the Constitutional Reform Association ceased to exist by October 1923.

== Post-war liberal trends ==
=== Young Plan ===
The liberal movement experienced a resurgence following the return of British rule in 1945, after a three-year long Japanese occupation of Hong Kong. Governor Mark Aitchison Young announced the plan for constitutional changes on the day of the return of the civil government in 1946, as "an appropriate and acceptable means of affording to all communities in Hong Kong an opportunity of more active political participation, through their responsible representatives, in the administration of the Territory." It proposed to set up a municipal council which would give Hong Kong a limited degree of representative government.

The Young Plan generated debates in the local community. Several political groups were set up to participate in the debate over political liberalisation, such as the Reform Club of Hong Kong, consisting mainly of the expatriate community, and the Hong Kong Chinese Reform Association, consisting of mostly Chinese members in 1949. However, due to the Communist takeover of China and the outbreak of the Korean War, Governor Alexander Grantham was less enthusiastic about the constitutional reform which eventually led to it being shelved in 1952. Two of the elected seats in the Urban Council were recreated in the 1952 election and were gradually increased as the membership of the Urban Council was expanded. The Reform Club, along with the Hong Kong Civic Association set up in 1954, participated in the Urban Council elections before the 1980s and were seen as the closest to opposition parties in Hong Kong during the post-war colonial period.

=== Self-government movement ===
The call for political liberalisation and self-government continued in the 1950s and 1960s. The United Nations Association of Hong Kong (UNAHK), formed by Ma Man-fai in 1953, demanded sovereignty in Hong Kong. In a proposal drafted in 1961, the association laid out a plan for an ultimately fully direct election for the Legislative Council, which in that period was appointed by the governor. The Reform Club and the Civic Association also formed a coalition in 1960 and sent a delegate to London to demand fully direct elections to the Legislative Council and universal suffrage, but failed to negotiate any meaningful reforms.

The self-proclaimed "anti-communist" and "anti-colonial" Democratic Self-Government Party of Hong Kong was set up in 1963, calling for a fully independent government in which the Chief Minister would be elected by all Hong Kong residents, while the British government would only preserve its power over diplomacy and military.

There were also the Hong Kong Socialist Democratic Party and the Labour Party of Hong Kong, which took a more left-leaning and democratic socialist approach to Hong Kong's independence and decolonization.

In 1966, Urban Councillor Elsie Elliott, who was also member of the UNAHK, visited London and met with British government officials and Members of Parliament, asking for constitutional reform towards sovereignty, a reform of the judiciary towards impartiality and equal representation, and comprehensive anti-corruption investigations of the colonial nomenklatura and legal authorities. After once again failing to obtain any successful concessions, all the parties advocating for the self-government in Hong Kong ceased to exist by the mid-1970s.

=== Positive non-interventionism ===
Economic liberalism and free-market capitalism remained the dominant economic philosophy in Hong Kong throughout its history. In 1971, Financial Secretary John Cowperthwaite coined the term "positive non-interventionism", which stated that the economy was doing well in the absence of government intervention and excessive regulation, but it was important to create the regulatory and physical infrastructure to facilitate market-based decision making. This policy was continued by subsequent Financial Secretaries, including Sir Philip Haddon-Cave, who said that "positive non-interventionism involves taking the view that it is usually futile and damaging to the growth rate of an economy, particularly an open economy, for the Government to attempt to plan the allocation of resources available to the private sector and to frustrate the operation of market forces", although he stated that the description of Hong Kong as a laissez-faire society was "frequent but inadequate".

The economic philosophy was highly praised by economist Milton Friedman, who wrote in 1990 that the Hong Kong economy was perhaps the best example of a free market economy. Right before he died in 2006, Friedman wrote the article "Hong Kong Wrong – What would Cowperthwaite say?" in The Wall Street Journal, criticizing Donald Tsang, then Chief Executive of Hong Kong who had the slogan of "big market, small government," where small government is defined as less than 20 per cent of the GDP, for abandoning the doctrine of "positive non-interventionism."

=== 1970s student movements ===
The 1970s in Hong Kong were the prime years of liberal student movements. Although the student unions were all dominated by the Chinese nationalists which were largely inspired by the Cultural Revolution and personality cult of Mao Zedong in mainland China at the time, a liberal cabinet led by Mak Hoi-wah and assisted by Albert Ho won the 1974 election of the Hong Kong University Students' Union (HKUSU). The liberals held slightly Chinese nationalist sentiments but strongly opposed the blind-eyed pro-Communist nationalist discourse and stressed caring for the Hong Kong society and its citizens. Many of them also opposed colonial rule. They participated in social movements, such as the Chinese Language Movement, the anti-corruption movement, the Baodiao movement and so on, in which many of the student leaders became the main leaders of the pro-democracy movement at the turn of the 21st century.

== Waves of liberalisation in the 1980s and 1990s ==
=== Sino-British agreement and drafting of the Basic Law ===
In the late 1970s, the reform and opening up launched by paramount leader of the Chinese Communist government Deng Xiaoping and the approaching of the question over the Hong Kong's sovereignty after 1997 opened the opportunity for the emergence of the contemporary liberalism in Hong Kong. In the late 1970s Governor Murray MacLehose carried out massive social reforms and also expanded the local representation of the colonial government and the district administration, which saw the establishment of the elected local advisory institutes District Boards and the territory-wide franchise of the Urban Council.

While the Beijing authorities insisted China shall resume its sovereignty over Hong Kong after 1997, British Prime Minister Margaret Thatcher insisted that the legality of the Treaty of Nanking must be upheld. Some Hong Kong liberal intellectuals saw it as an opportunity to change the colonial status quo to a democratic and fairer society. This view was held by Tsang Shu-ki, a prominent thinker in the social activist circle at the time. In January 1983, the liberals forming the Meeting Point favoured Chinese rule with the slogan of the new Three Principles of People, "Nation, Democracy and People's Livelihood." It became one of the earliest groups in Hong Kong that favoured Chinese sovereignty, but they also wanted a free, democratic and autonomous Hong Kong.

The Sino-British Joint Declaration of 1984 guaranteed Hong Kong would retain a high degree of autonomy under Chinese rule with the preservation of the maintained Western lifestyle in Hong Kong. Deng Xiaoping also emphasised the principle of "Hong Kong's people ruling Hong Kong." Starting from 1984, the colonial government began the process of decolonisation by gradually introducing representative democracy into Hong Kong. The reform proposals were first carried out in the Green Paper: the Further Development of Representative Government in July 1984 which allowed 24 seats in the Legislative Council to be indirectly elected by electoral college in 1985.

During the period, many liberal political groups were formed to contest the electoral politics in different levels. By the late 1980s, the Meeting Point led by Yeung Sum, the Hong Kong Affairs Society led by Albert Ho formed in 1985, and the Hong Kong Association for Democracy and People's Livelihood (HKADPL) led by Frederick Fung became the three major liberal political forces active in elections. The liberals also formed the Joint Committee on the Promotion of Democratic Government (JCPDG) to demand a faster pace of democratisation and to introduce direct elections in the 1988 Legislative Council. It was led by the two most prominent liberal icons, Martin Lee and Szeto Wah, who were elected to the Legislative Council and were also appointed by Beijing into the Hong Kong Basic Law Drafting Committee (BLDC), to draft the provisional constitution of the Hong Kong government after 1997.

To counter the liberal emergence, the business elites formed a conservative coalition with the pro-Communist Beijing loyalists, which warned of the rise of populism and disruption to the prosperity and stability if democratisation was to implement too quick. In the BLDC, the liberal faction, the Group of 190 also faced the conservative Group of 89, who favoured a less democratic system after 1997. Hong Kong became increasingly politicised in the latter half of the 1980s with two rival blocs debating on the pace of democratisation as well as various political and social issues.

=== Tiananmen protest and the liberal zenith ===
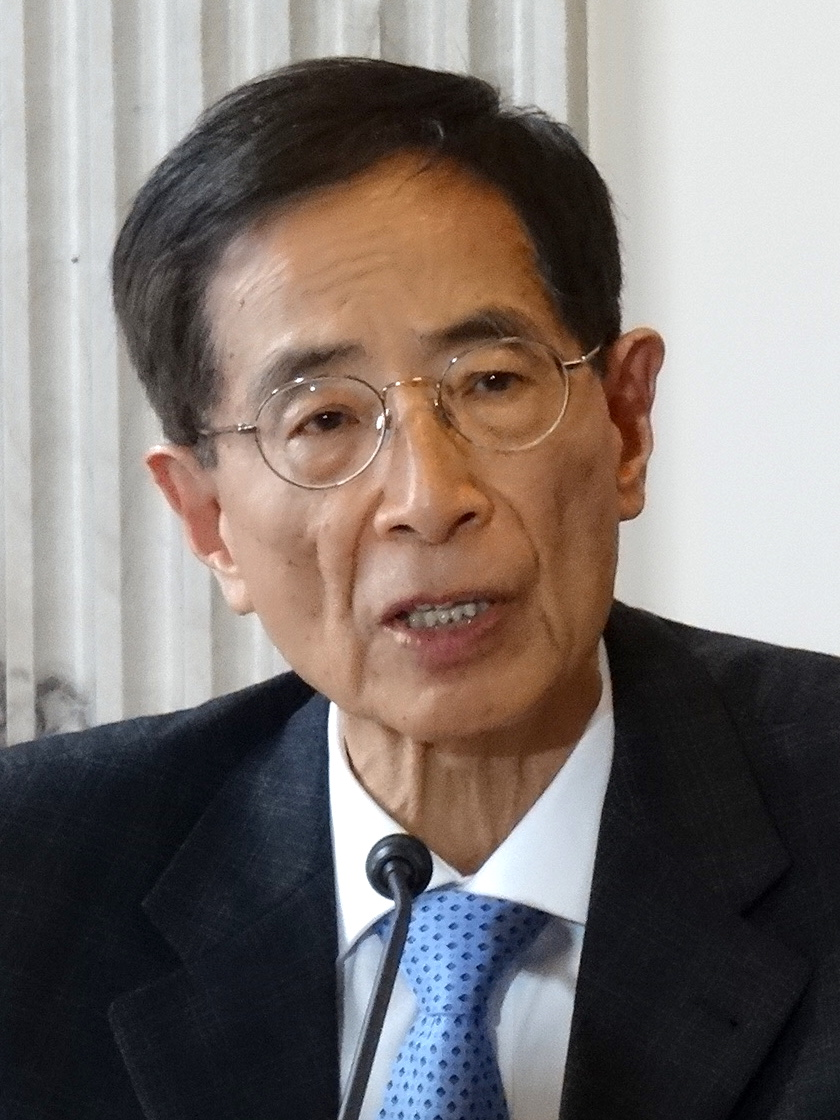
Martin Lee, a prominent figure of the Hong Kong democracy movement

The liberals supported the democratic cause of the Tiananmen protests of 1989 and formed the Hong Kong Alliance in Support of Patriotic Democratic Movements in China (HKASPDMC) to provide material supports to the student protesters in Beijing. Several solidarity demonstrations in May 1989 also attended by up to a million Hong Kong residents. The star-dubbed Concert for Democracy in China also raised more than over HK$12 million for the students in Beijing. The bloody crackdown on the protest on 4 June 1989 shocked the general public in Hong Kong and triggered a crisis of confidence in Hong Kong's future under Chinese rule, leading to the massive emigration waves on eve of the handover of Hong Kong.

Prominent liberal leaders Martin Lee and Szeto Wah resigned from the BLDC as an act of protest against the Beijing government after the massacre and the warm relationship between Beijing and pro-democrats have broken off since. The democrats have held the annual Tiananmen vigils every year and called for the end of one-party rule in China which was seen as "treason" and "subversive" by the Beijing authorities. The widespread fear of the Communist regime and the support for democracy also consolidated the popular foundation of the pro-democracy camp. In the first Legislative Council direct election in 1991, the liberals united under the banner of the United Democrats of Hong Kong (UDHK) which became the first major political party in Hong Kong's history. The UDHK and Meeting Point alliance and other pro-democratic independents including Emily Lau swept the votes by winning 16 of the 18 direct elected seats. To counter the liberal rise in the legislature, the conservative business elites formed the Liberal Party in 1993 which positioned itself as the defender of economically liberal values such as free market and free enterprise but took political conservative positions against democratisation.

The arrival of the last governor Chris Patten, the former chairman of the British Conservative Party, also brought a paradigm shift on Hong Kong politics. Despite Beijing's strong opposition, he put forward the progressive constitutional reform proposals to enfranchise 2.7 million new voters and lower the voting age from 21 to 18. Safeguarded by the liberal majority, the Patten proposals were passed in the Legislative Council after unprecedented political wrangling despite the Beijing's attempt to defeat the bill by allying the business elites. In the substantially more democratic elections in 1995, the Democratic Party, formed out of the merger of the United Democrats and the Meeting Point movement received another landslide victory, winning half of the Legislative Council seats. Many liberal pieces of legislation were able to pass in the final years of colonial rule, such as decriminalising same-sex acts, abolishing death penalty and the Hong Kong Bill of Rights Ordinance. Given the booming Hong Kong economy, the colonial government also mildly expanded social welfare and public housing. At the time, there were also new liberal parties being set up, such as the radical The Frontier, led by Emily Lau, and the Citizens Party, led by Christine Loh.

In response to the Patten proposals, the Beijing government set up the Provisional Legislative Council (PLC) which was seen as unconstitutional by the pro-democrats. The pro-democrats, except for the HKADPL, boycotted the PLC and stepped down as legislators during the last days of colonial rule. The pro-democrats ran again in the first legislative elections of the SAR period. Although the pro-democrats continuously received about 55 to 60 per cent of the popular vote in every election held since 1997, their influence was contained and hampered by the indirectly elected trade-based functional constituencies.

== Democratic stagnation in the early handover period ==
=== Basic Law Article 23 and 2003 pro-democracy wave ===
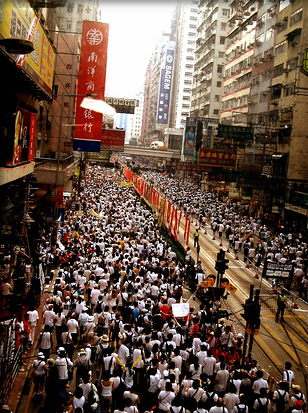
The historic 1 July 2003 demonstration against the Basic Law Article 23, which drew in excess of 500,000 protesters

Being excluded from the government by the unique design of the electoral system and composition of the Legislative Council, the liberals took a defensive role of safeguarding Hong Kong's civil liberties, human rights, rule of law and autonomy from Beijing interference while striving for the universal suffrage of the Chief Executive and the Legislative Council as stipulated in Hong Kong Basic Law Article 45 and Article 68. The pro-democrats launched a civil nomination to nominate Szeto Wah to run in a mock first SAR Chief Executive election, while some activists launched a protest on the establishment day of the Special Administrative Region (SAR) on 1 July to call for the implementation of universal suffrage and the abolishing of the functional constituencies.

The Democratic Party, the flagship liberal party of Hong Kong, suffered from the intra-party factional struggles in the first SAR years where the more radical pro-grassroots "Young Turks" split from the party after failing to challenge the moderate party leadership. They formed the Social Democratic Forum which held a more social democratic and pro-working-class stance and later joined Emily Lau's The Frontier.

Between 2002 and 2003 when Hong Kong was still suffering from the Asian financial crisis and the SARS epidemic, the Tung Chee-hwa administration proposed the national security legislation enforcing the Basic Law Article 23 sparked the fear among the liberals who deemed the bill a potential threat to Hong Kong people's civil liberties. On 1 July 2003, an estimated 350,000 to 700,000 people marched to the street against the unpopular Tung administration which eventually brought down the legislation. The massive demonstration reenergised the pro-democracy movement, which saw a wave of new activists participating in social activism and electoral politics which led to the formation of the middle-class and professional oriented Civic Party and the social democratic League of Social Democrats (LSD) in 2006.

The liberal movement lost its momentum after the 2004 decision of the National People's Congress Standing Committee (NPCSC) ruled out the universal suffrage for the Chief Executive and Legislative Council in 2007 and 2008. The liberals successfully entered the 2007 Chief Executive election for the first time when Alan Leong of the Civic Party secured nomination from the 800-member Election Committee strictly controlled by Beijing. Alan Leong ultimately lost to incumbent Chief Executive Donald Tsang, receiving only 15 per cent of the electoral votes. In December 2007, the NPCSC once again ruled out universal suffrage in 2012 but stated that the 2017 Chief Executive election may be held with universal suffrage.

=== Liberal disarray and Umbrella Revolution ===
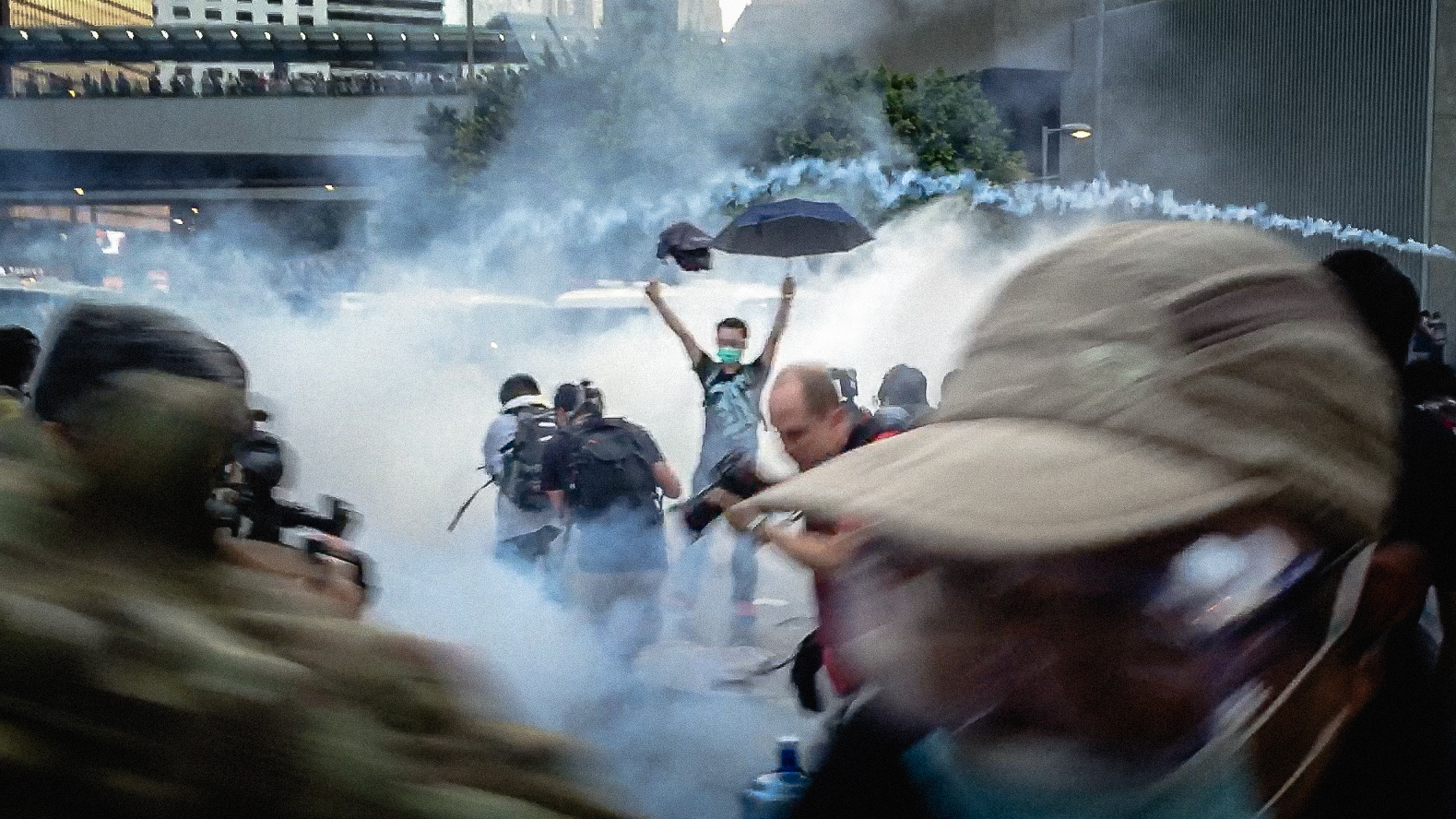
The "Umbrella Man" photo as police dispersed protesters with tear gas on 28 September 2014

In 2009, the radical League of Social Democrats (LSD) proposed a "Five Constituencies Referendum" campaign by triggering a city-wide by-election to pressure the government to implement the universal suffrage in 2012. The proposal was welcomed by the Civic Party by rejected by the Democratic Party, which caused a great disunity among the liberal movement. Instead, the Democratic Party and the moderate Alliance for Universal Suffrage sought to engage in peaceful negotiations with Beijing, and officially split from the Civic Party and the League of Social Democrats. After a secret meeting with the Beijing authorities at the Liaison Office, the central government accepted the Democratic Party's modified proposals to allow ten new seats to be directly elected. The negotiation was seen as an "act of betrayal" by the radicals which led to emergence of the People Power running against the Democratic Party in the 2011 District Council election.

Dissatisfied with the traditional liberals' little success in resisting Beijing's growing economic and political influence over Hong Kong, a young generation of localist activists who focused on preserving Hong Kong's heritage and identity with some opposing the influx of mainland Chinese culture, ideologies, tourists and immigrants, often with more confrontational methods, gradually grew in strength in the 2010s. In 2012, the introduction of the Moral and National Education which was seen as imposing pro-authoritarian and anti-liberal views triggered a massive student protests led by secondary school student Joshua Wong and other student activists from Scholarism which eventually forced the government to withdraw the scheme. On the other hand, the increasing tensions between the locals and the influx of the mainland Chinese tourists also led to social issues such as Dolce & Gabbana controversy, the Kong Qingdong incident, birth tourism and parallel trading controversies which led to several local protests. Some localists' militant and nativist tendencies often created tensions with the cultural liberals and resulted in further fragmentation within the pro-democracy camp.

In 2013, legal scholar Benny Tai proposed an act of non-violent civil disobedience to put pressure on the government if its universal suffrage proposals proved not to meet the "international standards", which led to the Occupy Central with Love and Peace (OCLP) campaign. After the National People's Congress Standing Committee (NPCSC) on 31 August 2014 announced the framework of the constitutional reform proposal in which Chief Executive candidates would be pre-screened before being elected by the Hong Kong public, the students activists led by Scholarism and Hong Kong Federation of Students (HKFS) launched a coordinated class boycott which turned into a breaching into the Central Government Complex. The confrontations between the protesters and police eventually escalated to the 79-day massive sit-in in various locations in Hong Kong known as the "Umbrella Revolution" due to the protesters' use of umbrellas as a tool for defence from the police's assaults.

Although the Occupy protests ended without any political concessions from the government, it precipitated a generation of galvanised youth and awakening of Hong Kong people's civic consciousness. After the failure of the protests, the call for Hong Kong independence grew rapidly among the young localist movement. In the 2016 New Territories East by-election, Edward Leung of the pro-independence Hong Kong Indigenous received more than 15 percent of the popular vote despite being defeated by Civic Party's Alvin Yeung. the government unprecedentedly barred many localists including Edward Leung from running in the 2016 Legislative Council election, localist candidates under different banners of Hong Kong's "national self-determination" and "democratic self-determination" received 19 per cent of vote in total with six of them being elected, including Occupy protest leader Nathan Law of the Demosistō becoming the youngest legislator in history at the age of 23. However over the oath-taking manners by some localist legislators-elect, the NPCSC unprecedentedly interpreted the Basic Law which led to the disqualification of six liberal and localist legislators including Nathan Law.

== Liberals under the national security law ==
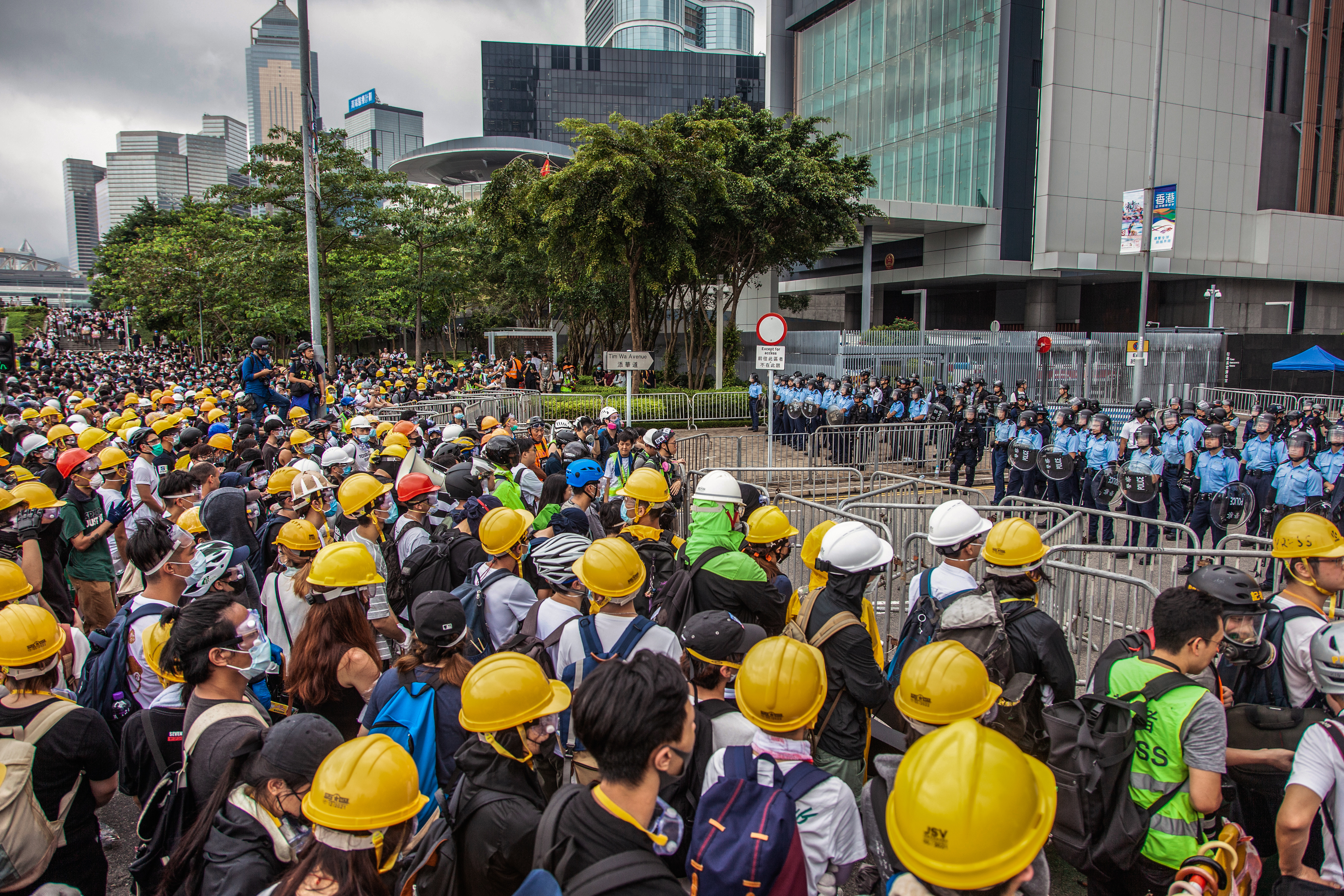
A standoff between protesters and police outside the Central Government Complex during the 12 June 2019 protest

The liberal movement went through a slump after the failure of the Occupy protests and government's retaliation on the protest leaders, putting Benny Tai, Joshua Wong and Nathan Law in jail until in 2019, when the Carrie Lam administration proposed an amendment to the extradition law which would allow transfers of fugitives to mainland China. The liberals feared it would open itself up to the long arm of mainland Chinese law, putting people from Hong Kong at risk of falling victim to China's closed legal system. The anti-extradition movement grew into massive anti-government protests which attracted more than a million demonstrators into the streets and direct confrontations between the protesters and police.

As the protests progressed, activists laid out five key demands including the introduction of universal suffrage. Some protesters also called for Hong Kong's full independence from China. The storming of the Legislative Council Complex after the annual July 1 march led to the spillovers of the protests all over the city, as the government refused to fully withdraw the extradition bill. The police's inaction when a group of alleged triad members indiscriminately attacked commuters in Yuen Long on 21 July also resulted in the widespread distrust between the police and the public. The protests escalated into the intense confrontations in the siege of the Chinese University of Hong Kong and the Hong Kong Polytechnic University in mid November. The 24 November District Council election, which was widely seen as a de facto referendum on the protest, resulted in the historic landslide victory for the liberals and localists, where the pro-Beijing camp lost nearly four-fifth of its seats.

To curb the protests, the government invoked the Emergency Regulations Ordinance to impose a law to ban wearing face masks in public gatherings on 4 October. As the COVID-19 pandemic hit the city in early 2020 and the protests dwindled, the National People's Congress Standing Committee (NPCSC) imposed a national security law outlawed "secession, foreign interference, terrorism and subversion against the central government" on 1 July. The law immediately created a chilling effect in the city as Demosistō, which had been involved in lobbying for foreign support, and several pro-independence groups disbanded and ceased all operations hours after the passage of the new law, fearing that they would be the targets of the new law. Pro-independence activist Tony Chung became the first political figure to be arrested on suspicion of violating the national security law on 29 July. On 10 August, the police raided the offices of Next Digital, the parent company of prominent local liberal newspaper Apple Daily and arrested its founder and outspoken activist Jimmy Lai and his two sons on the suspicion of violating the national security law.

In July, the pro-democrats launched an inter-party primaries to maximise the chance for the liberals to win a majority in the upcoming Legislative Council election. The government warned that the primaries might violate the national security law as organiser Benny Tai and some candidates vowed to seize control of the legislature and vote down key government proposals. Four incumbent pro-democracy legislators and many activists were disqualified from running in the general election for opposing or violating the national security law before Carrie Lam unprecedentedly invoked the Emergency Regulations Ordinance to postpone the election citing the COVID-19 pandemic. In November, the NPCSC passed another resolution to disqualify the four incumbent pro-democracy legislators who were barred from running earlier which led to the mass resignations of all pro-democracy legislators, which left the legislature without any virtual opposition for the first time since 1998. In January 2021, all 55 candidates and organisers in the pro-democracy primaries were arrested under the national security law.

== List of liberal parties ==
=== Meeting Point ===
- 1983: Formation of the Meeting Point
- 1990: Members of the group formed the ⇒ United Democrats of Hong Kong
- 1994: The party merged into the ⇒ Democratic Party
- 2002: Anthony Cheung of the Democratic Party left and formed think tank ⇒ SynergyNet
- 2015: Tik Chi-yuen of the Democratic Party left and formed ⇒ Third Side

=== Hong Kong Association for Democracy and People's Livelihood ===
- 1986: Formation of the Hong Kong Association for Democracy and People's Livelihood
- 1990: Members of the group formed the ⇒ United Democrats of Hong Kong
- 1996: The radical faction left and formed the ⇒ Social Democratic Front

=== Hong Kong Democratic Foundation ===
- 1989: Formation of the Hong Kong Democratic Foundation
- 1992: Leong Che-hung of the group joined the ⇒ Meeting Point

=== United Democrats to Democratic Party ===
- 1990: The liberals united in the United Democrats of Hong Kong
- 1994: The Meeting Point merged into the ⇒ Democratic Party
- 2000: The left-wing faction left and formed the ⇒ Social Democratic Forum
- 2008: The Frontier merged into the ⇒ Democratic Party
- 2010: The young Turks left and formed the ⇒ Neo Democrats
- 2015: The moderate faction left and formed the ⇒ Third Side

=== Hong Kong Confederation of Trade Unions ===
- 1990: Hong Kong Christian Industrial Committee formed the Hong Kong Confederation of Trade Unions
- 2012: The union formed the ⇒ Labour Party
- 2021: The union was dissolved

=== Democratic Alliance ===
- 1994: Pro-Taiwan politicians formed 123 Democratic Alliance
- 2000: The party was dissolved
- 2003: Former members formed Yuen Long Tin Shui Wai Democratic Alliance
- 2011: The Democratic Alliance formed alliance with the ⇒ People Power
- 2012: The Democratic Alliance broke away from the People Power
- 2021: The party was dissolved

=== The Frontier ===
- 1996: The United Ants formed the Frontier
- 2003: Cyd Ho of the group formed the ⇒ Civic Act-up
- 2006: The social democratic faction left and formed the ⇒ League of Social Democrats
- 2008: The party merged into the ⇒ Democratic Party
- 2010: The radical faction re-registered the party
- 2011: The party formed alliance with the ⇒ People Power
- 2016: The party broke away from the People Power

=== Citizens Party ===
- 1997: Formation of the Citizens Party
- 2008: The party was dissolved

=== Article 23 Concern Group to Civic Party ===
- 2002: Formation of the Article 23 Concern Group
- 2003: The group renamed to the ⇒ Article 45 Concern Group
- 2006: The group transformed into the ⇒ Civic Party
- 2008: Fernando Cheung left the party and later formed the ⇒ Labour Party
- 2015: Ronny Tong left the party and formed the think tank ⇒ Path of Democracy
- 2016: Claudia Mo left the party and represented ⇒ HK First

=== Civic Act-up ===
- 2003: Cyd Ho formed the Civic Act-up
- 2012: The group formed the ⇒ Labour Party

=== League of Social Democrats ===
- 2006: Formation of the League of Social Democrats
- 2011: Members of the party left and formed the ⇒ People Power

=== Neo Democrats ===
- 2010: Formation of the Neo Democrats
- 2021: The party was dissolved

=== People Power ===
- 2011: Formation of the People Power
- 2012: Wong Yeung-tat left along with the ⇒ Civic Passion
- 2013: Wong Yuk-man left along with the ⇒ Proletariat Political Institute

=== Labour Party ===
- 2012: Formation of the Labour Party

=== Demosistō ===
- 2016: Formation of Demosistō
- 2020: The party was dissolved

== Liberal figures and organisations ==
Politicians and office holders

- Brook Bernacchi (colonial era)
- John Bowring (colonial era)
- Anson Chan
- Eddie Chu
- Ding Lik-kiu
- Audrey Eu
- Frederick Fung
- John Pope Hennessy (colonial era)
- Albert Ho
- Cyd Ho
- Ho Kai
- Denny Huang
- Lau Chin-shek
- Emily Lau
- Nathan Law
- Lee Cheuk-yan
- Martin Lee
- Alan Leong
- Christine Loh
- Chris Patten (colonial era)
- Szeto Wah
- Elsie Tu
- Yeung Sum

Intellectuals, writers and activists

- Johannes Chan
- Chan Kin-man
- Ching Cheong
- Alex Chow
- Tony Chung
- Kuan Hsin-chi
- Leung Man-tao
- Lester Shum
- Ma Man-fai
- Benny Tai
- Tsang Shu-ki
- Tse Tsan-tai
- Joshua Wong
- Yau Lit
- Yeung Ku-wan

Think-tanks

- Civic Exchange
- Hong Kong Democratic Foundation
- Path of Democracy
- SynergyNet

Magazines and media

- Apple Daily
- Citizens Radio
- D100
- Hong Kong Reporter

Media personalities, radio hosts, and bloggers

- Albert Cheng
- Denise Ho
- Jimmy Lai
- Li Wei-ling
- Stephen Shiu
- Anthony Wong (Hong Kong actor)
- Anthony Wong (singer)

Organisations

- Civil Human Rights Front
- Hong Kong Alliance in Support of Patriotic Democratic Movements in China
- Hong Kong Bar Association
- Hong Kong Christian Industrial Committee
- Hong Kong Federation of Students
- Hong Kong Professional Teachers' Union
- Hong Kong Society of Community Organisation
- Hong Kong Social Workers' General Union
- Professional Commons
- Scholarism

Religious leaders active in liberal politics

- Chu Yiu-ming
- Fung Chi-wood
- Franco Mella
- Joseph Zen

Jurists

- Kemal Bokhary

== See also ==
- Democratic development in Hong Kong
- Economy of Hong Kong
- Human rights in Hong Kong
- LGBT rights in Hong Kong
- United front in Hong Kong

=== Other ideologies in Hong Kong ===
- Anarchism in Hong Kong
- Centrism in Hong Kong
- Conservatism in Hong Kong
- Localism in Hong Kong
- Socialism in Hong Kong
