= New Territories North East (2021 constituency) =

Geographical constituency in Hong Kong

- Geographical constituency for the Legislative Council of Hong Kong
- Boundary of New Territories North East in Hong Kong
- District: Tai Po District; Western part of Sha Tin District
- Region: New Territories
- Population: 775,100
- Electorate: 478,252

Current constituency
- Created: 2021
- Number of members: Two
- Members: Chan Hak-kan (DAB/NTAS); Dominic Lee (NPP/CF)
- Created from: New Territories East (1998)

The New Territories North East geographical constituency is one of the ten geographical constituencies in the elections for the Legislative Council of Hong Kong which elects two members of the Legislative Council using the single non-transferable vote (SNTV) system. The constituency covers Tai Po District and western part of Sha Tin District in New Territories.

== History ==
The constituency was created under the overhaul of the electoral system imposed by the Beijing government in 2021, replacing Tai Po District and western part of Sha Tin District (all District Council constituencies not covered by New Territories South East) of the New Territories East used from 1998 to 2021. A constituency with the same name were also created for the 1995 Legislative Council election in the late colonial period.

== Returning members ==
| Election | Member | Party | Member | Party |
|---|---|---|---|---|
| 2021 | Chan Hak-kan | DAB/NTAS | Dominic Lee | NPP/CF |
| 2025 | Chan Hak-kan | DAB/NTAS | Dominic Lee | NPP/CF |

== Election results ==
=== 2020s ===
2025 Legislative Council election: New Territories North East
| Party | Candidate | Votes | % | ±% |
|---|---|---|---|---|
| DAB (NTAS) | Gary Chan Hak-kan | 41,612 | 32.1 | |
| NPP (Civil Force) | Dominic Lee Tsz-king | 42,749 | 33.0 | |
| BPA | Calvin Tang Siu-fung | 15,319 | 11.8 | |
| Nonpartisan (PoD) | Allan Wong Wing-ho | 11,951 | 9.2 | |
| Nonpartisan | Ku Wai-ping | 18,003 | 13.9 | |
| Total valid votes | | | | |
| Rejected ballots | | | | |
| Turnout | | | | |
| Registered electors | | 446,155 | | |
| DAB hold | | Swing | | |
| New People's Party hold | | Swing | | |

Vote share
1. DAB (46.5%)
2. New People's Party (45.4%)
3. Path of Democracy (3.82%)
4. Nonpartisan (4.29%)

2021 Legislative Council election: New Territories North East
| Party | Candidate | Votes | % | ±% |
|---|---|---|---|---|
| DAB (NTAS) | Gary Chan Hak-kan | 62,855 | 46.55 | |
| NPP (Civil Force) | Dominic Lee Tsz-king | 61,253 | 45.35 | |
| Ind. democrat | Wong Sing-chi | 5,789 | 4.29 | |
| PoD | Allan Wong Wing-ho | 5,160 | 3.82 | |
| Total valid votes | | 135,057 | 100.00 | |
| Rejected ballots | | 3,116 | | |
| Turnout | | 138,173 | 28.89 | |
| Registered electors | | 478,252 | | |
| DAB win (new seat) | | | | |
| NPP win (new seat) | | | | |
