= Hong Kong Citizen Forum =

The Hong Kong Citizen Forum (Chinese: 港人論壇) was a short-lived pro-Beijing political organisation in Hong Kong founded in 1991. Led by Gary Cheng Kai-nam. a school teacher from a traditional leftist school, the organisation was formed on 20 April 1991 in the background of the first direct election for the Legislative Council of Hong Kong in September.

== Aims ==
The aims of the organisation were to maintain prosperity and stability of Hong Kong and its status as an international city. It also aimed at realising the genuine "Hong Kong people ruling Hong Kong" and promoting communication with Mainland China with dialogues and pragmatism, rejecting confrontational and isolated approach of solving conflicts between Hong Kong and China.

== History ==
There were 13 founding members who mostly professionals, in which Gary Cheng Kai-nam was the Chairman, Fung Yee-chiu and Leung Tak-kwan the Vice-Chairmen, Kwan Pak-lam the Treasurer and Suen Kai-cheong the General Secretary. It filled 9 members with independent label in the 1991 District Board elections with limited support.

The organisation took a sharp stance on the issue of Vietnamese boat people who took refugee in Hong Kong. It launched a signature campaign, collecting 40,000 signatures to the Consulate General of the United States in Hong Kong, the Government House and the United Nations High Commissioner for Refugees, to press the United States, the United Kingdom and the United Nations to solve the refugee question in Hong Kong and deport them back to Vietnam. It also stressed the right of Hong Kong people to cancel of the policy of Hong Kong being an asylum.

In the 1991 Legislative Council elections, Gary Cheng Kai-nam contested in the Island East but was defeated by the liberal United Democrats of Hong Kong (UDHK) candidates Martin Lee and Man Sai-cheong. In July 1992, Gary Cheng co-founded the pro-Beijing Democratic Alliance for the Betterment of Hong Kong (DAB).
