= Angel Chong Nga-ting =

Hong Kong district councillor

Angel Nga-Ting Chong
- 莊雅婷
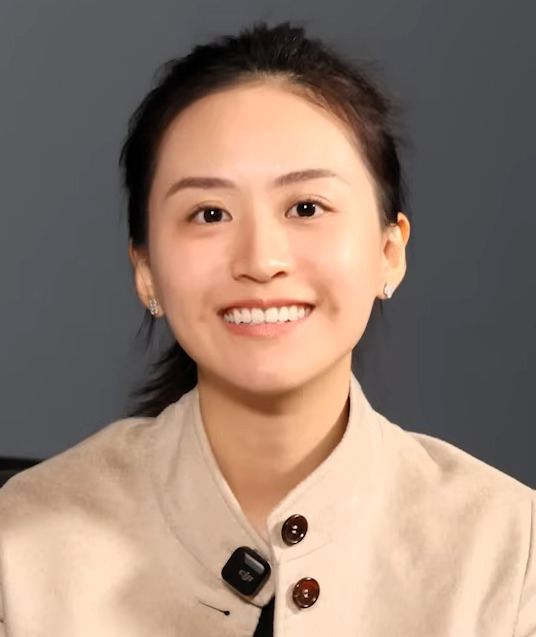
- Chong in 2026
- Constituency: Sai Kung (西貢)

Personal details
- Party: Democratic Alliance for the Betterment and Progress of Hong Kong
- Spouse: Derek Cheung (m. 2026)

Angel Chong Nga-ting (Chinese: 莊雅婷; Jyutping: Zong^{1} Ngaa^{5} Ting^{4}) is a Hong Kong district councillor in Sai Kung District. A member of the pro-establishment Democratic Alliance for the Betterment and Progress of Hong Kong (DAB), she became the youngest appointed councillor in the 2023 term at age 23.

== Early life and education ==
Chong was raised in Hong Kong and graduated from Creative Secondary School in Sai Kung. After graduating, she enrolled at Peking University, where she pursued dual programs at the School of Government and the Guanghua School of Management. During the COVID-19 pandemic, she took a leave of absence to assist relief efforts in Hong Kong, including logistics coordination and volunteer work at vaccination centers.

Prior to her political career, Chong worked at China Merchants Group, a state-owned conglomerate.

== Political career ==
In December 2023, Chong was appointed as a Sai Kung District Councillor under Hong Kong’s revamped electoral system, which emphasized patriotism and governance experience. As the youngest councillor of her term at the age of 23, she highlighted her commitment to "serving the country and Hong Kong" in public statements.

She identified surpassing Executive Council convener Regina Ip Lau Suk-yee's 22,000 Instagram followers as a key performance indicator, aiming to become Hong Kong's most-followed politician on social media. Chong also planned to launch a YouTube channel to amplify her outreach.

In 2025, Chong briefly entered the Miss Hong Kong pageant but withdrew amid scrutiny over whether her participation aligned with district council duties. Alice Mak, Secretary for Home and Youth Affairs, reiterated that councillors must prioritize official responsibilities, including maintaining an 80% meeting attendance rate.

== Personal life ==
On March 4 2026, right after the Chinese New Year, Chong was successfully proposed by Hong Kong businessman Derek Cheung. On March 28, 2026, Chong and Cheung are formally married.
