= Hong Kong Socialist Democratic Party =

Hong Kong Socialist Democratic Party 香港社會民主黨
- Leader: Sun Pao-kang
- Founded: 8 August 1964
- Split from: Democratic Self-Government Party
- Newspaper: New Society
- Ideology: Anti-colonialism; Anti-communism; Democratic socialism
- Political position: Left-wing

Hong Kong Socialist Democratic Party
- Traditional Chinese: 香港社會民主黨
Transcriptions
Yue: Cantonese
- Yale Romanization: Hēung góng séh wuih màhn jyú dóng
- Jyutping: Hoeng1 gong2 se5 wui6 man4 zyu2 dong2

The Hong Kong Socialist Democratic Party was a democratic socialist political party in Hong Kong was founded by Sun Pao-kang on 8 August 1964.

== Overview ==
The party was composed of a group of liberal-minded Chinese who had settled in Hong Kong because of the rise of Communist Party in the mainland China, and had recognized the value of the British administration in Hong Kong.

Sun Pao-kang among his supporters, was a former Lieutenant-General in the National Revolutionary Army and the member of the China Democratic Socialist Party, who had become disaffected with Chiang Kai-shek's Kuomintang government however opposed Mao's Communist regime. They wished to build up a model for modern China under British protection in Hong Kong, as well as a third force between the leftist and rightist politics in the colony.
