= Ronny Tong =

Hong Kong politician

The Honourable Ronny Tong Ka-wah GBS KC SC JP
- 湯家驊
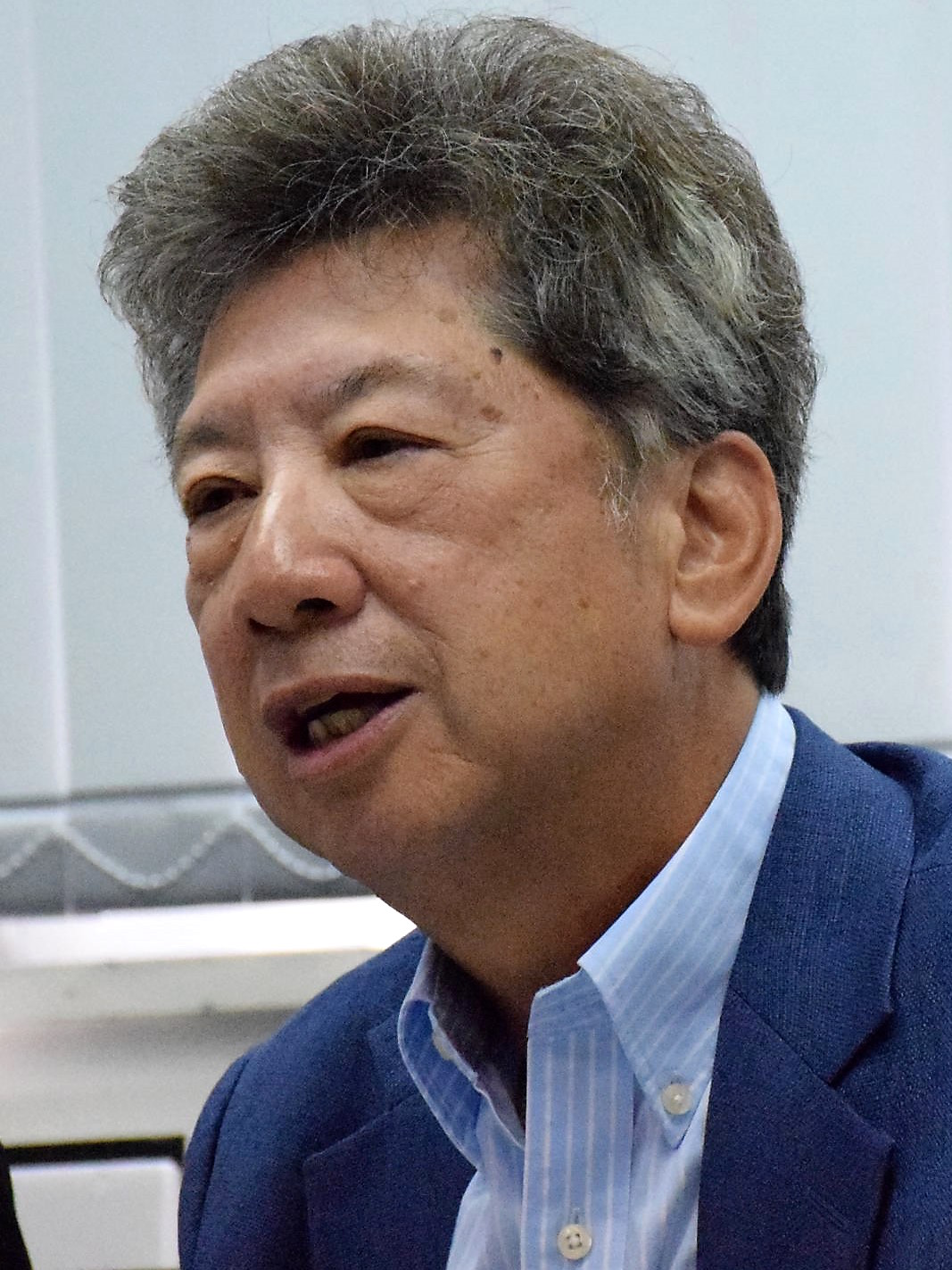

Non-official Member of the Executive Council
- Incumbent
- Assumed office 1 July 2017
- Appointed by: Carrie Lam; John Lee

Member of the Legislative Council
- In office 1 October 2004 – 30 September 2015
- Preceded by: New seat
- Succeeded by: Alvin Yeung
- Constituency: New Territories East

Personal details
- Born: 28 August 1950 (age 76) British Hong Kong
- Other political affiliations: Path of Democracy (2015–25); Civic Party (2006–15)
- Spouse: Daisy Tong Yeung Wai-lan
- Education: University of Hong Kong (LL.B.); St Edmund Hall, Oxford (B.C.L.)
- Profession: Senior counsel

Ronny Tong
- Traditional Chinese: 湯家驊
- Simplified Chinese: 汤家骅
Transcriptions
Standard Mandarin
- Hanyu Pinyin: Tāng Jiāhuá
Yue: Cantonese
- Yale Romanization: Tōng Gā wàh
- Jyutping: Tong^{1} Gaa^{1} waa^{4}

Ronny Tong Ka-wah GBS KC SC JP (Chinese: 湯家驊; born 28 August 1950) is a Hong Kong barrister and politician. He has been a non-official member of the Executive Council of Hong Kong since 2017.

Tong co-founded the Civic Party and was a member of the Legislative Council of Hong Kong, representing the New Territories East constituency from 2004 until he quit the party and resigned from the legislature on 22 June 2015, following the historic vote on Hong Kong electoral reform a few days earlier, having switched his political alignment from pro-democracy to centrist Hong Kong political group Path of Democracy, of which he is currently the convener.

== Education and legal career ==
Tong was born in Hong Kong in 1950 to a family with ancestral roots in Xinhui in the province of Guangdong. He attended Queen's College, Hong Kong and studied law at the University of Hong Kong, where he graduated top of his class and with first-class honours. He then further received his Bachelor of Civil Law degree from St Edmund Hall, Oxford. He was called to the Bar by the Middle Temple and achieved top marks in the Bar Exams. He took silk in 1990 and was the chairman of the Hong Kong Bar Association from 1999 to 2001. He continues to practice from Temple Chambers, where he served as Head of Chambers from 2001 to 2006.

Eight days after his election as chairman of the Bar on 21 January 1999, the Court of Final Appeal ruled that mainland Chinese children born before their parents acquired permanent residency in Hong Kong were entitled to the right of abode in the city. In June 1999, the National People's Congress Standing Committee (NPCSC) made an interpretation of the Basic Law that effectively overruled the city's top court in the case. Tong opposed the NPCSC's interpretation, warning that a "Damocles sword" was hanging over the head of the Court of Final Appeal as a result of the government's refusal to rule out requesting Beijing to interpret the law in future cases. He said the failure to make a public promise not to seek further interpretations of the Basic Law from Beijing had damaged public confidence in the rule of law. "Confidence in our legal system and the independence of our judiciary are bound to suffer," he said in his annual report to barristers.

Tong also targeted then Secretary for Justice Elsie Leung's handling of the Sally Aw Sian case, in which the publishing tycoon was not prosecuted for a fraud plot involving her company although she was named as a conspirator in the charges.

Tong sat as a Deputy High Court Judge in 2002.

== Early political career ==
He ran in the 2002 Election Committee Subsector by-elections in the Legal sub-sector, which was responsible for electing the Chief Executive of Hong Kong in the 2002 election.

In 2002, he co-founded the Article 23 Concern Group with former Bar Association chairmen Audrey Eu Yuet-mee and Alan Leong Kah-kit, to oppose the government's attempt to implement Article 23 of the Basic Law, which they believed posed a threat to civil liberties and basic freedoms. He entered the spotlight as a legal expert when half a million Hong Kong people took to the streets in 2003 to protest against the proposed Article 23 anti-subversion bill that was later shelved. After the 1 July protest, the group transformed into the Article 45 Concern Group to call for universal suffrage in 2007 and 2008, as required under Article 45 of the Basic Law.

== Legislative Councillor ==
In the 2004 Legislative Council election, Tong, along with fellow barristers Audrey Eu and Alan Leong, ran in the geographical constituency direct elections as members of the Article 45 Concern Group. Tong combined with the other pro-democrats to form a joint list in the New Territories East constituency, where he was placed behind the Democratic Party's Andrew Cheng Kar-foo and The Frontier's Emily Lau. The list received more than 160,000 votes, and Cheng, Lau and Tong were elected.

In March 2006, Tong and members of the Article 45 Concern Group co-founded the Civic Party, and he became a member of the party's executive committee. In the 2008 and 2012 Legislative Council elections, he was re-elected to represent New Territories East.

In the 2011 District Council election, he stood for election in City One with the intention to contest the new District Council (Second) seat created under the 2012 constitutional reform package, but was defeated by pro-Beijing independent Wong Ka-wing.

=== 2010 electoral reform ===
As a moderate pan-democrat, Tong opposed the party's decision in January 2010 to join the "Five Constituencies Referendum", in which five democratic legislators, representative of the bloc, resigned and re-stood in their constituencies as a de facto referendum over the 2012 constitutional reform package, an action that was heavily criticised by Beijing. Tong intended to vote for the modified reform package, but was required to vote with the rest of Civic Party to oppose it.

=== 2015 electoral reform ===
During the debate over the electoral reform over the 2017 Chief Executive election, Tong publicly criticised as unreasonable the pan-democrats' support of party or public nomination for chief executive candidates. He put forward a more moderate proposal in October 2013. The proposal suggested increasing the membership of the nominating committee from the 1,200-member Election Committee to 1,514, while maintaining the nomination threshold of 150 votes. Tong recommended the instant runoff voting system, which is used in Ireland, Australia, Sri Lanka; in mayoral elections in London, San Francisco; and in elections for some state governors in the United States, to elect a CE who could be acceptable to all sectors. Tong also advocated repealing an existing law which disallows the Chief Executive belonging to a political party membership.

On 31 August 2014, when Beijing announced its decision constraining Hong Kong's political reform, which would spark the 2014 Hong Kong protests, Tong was immediately critical, vowing to vote against it, which cast severe doubt on the government's ability to win the two-thirds majority a reform package needed in the Legislative Council. He cried as he reacted on a live Cable TV programme. "It is the darkest day in the road for democracy," he said. "I am disheartened ... I don't see a future for moderates in Hong Kong politics." A moderate reform plan he drew up – under which the public would not be allowed to nominate chief executive candidates – received a cool response from his allies. The barrister said he would think carefully about the next step in his political career after a decision from Beijing that was "more undemocratic than I could imagine". "I thought there would be [some] chance for future dialogue," he said, referring to when pan-democrats were invited for talks with Beijing officials the previous month. "But now, I don't see any chance." He eventually voted against the unmodified proposal with other pan-democrat legislators. On 8 June 2015, before the vote, he set up a think tank Path of Democracy, composed of moderate democrats.

=== Resignation from party and Legco ===
On 6 December 2014, Tong stepped down from the executive of the Civic Party that he co-founded. On 22 June 2015, a few days after the legislative vote, he announced that he would quit as a member of the party, saying that since the end of 2009, the Civic Party's line had deviated from its founding values. He would also resign from the Legislative Council saying it was inappropriate for him to continue having stood and been elected representing the Civic Party.

== Executive Councillor ==
He was seen as a supporter of Carrie Lam in the 2017 Chief Executive election. After the election, he was appointed by Lam to the Executive Council of Hong Kong (ExCo), being the only non-official member in the ExCo with a pro-democracy background.

=== 2020 Defence of new security law ===
He appeared on the BBC show "HARDtalk" where he defended the new security law. He said, "I am still fighting for democracy for Hong Kong, but there's no way to fight for democracy by trying to call for independence, is there? Is there any real chance for anybody in Hong Kong or elsewhere, to seriously think that calling for independence to Hong Kong would succeed in getting full democracy established in Hong Kong?" In 2003, he was a critic of a similar national security law, but has since changed his position and supported the law, claiming that "There are no mass arrests of dissidents and no shutting down of media," despite the shutting down of Apple Daily.

== Views ==
In April 2021, after the government moved to ban calls to boycott elections, Tong said that it was "politically and ethically" the right thing to do and that people should "stop making a fuss about it".

In August 2022, Tong commented that he always favoured judges over jurors, after Secretary for Justice Paul Lam decided that a national security case involving 47 democrats would be tried without a jury, in a break with the 177-year-old tradition of High Court jury trials in Hong Kong.

In September 2022, Tong and his party, the Path of Democracy, advocated teaching Simplified Chinese in Hong Kong schools, where Traditional Chinese is normally used.

On 5 October 2022, legislator Doreen Kong criticised the government and Secretary for Health Lo Chung-mau for invalidating 20,000 COVID-19 vaccine exemption passes, stating that he had no legal authority to do so, with Kong asking "Who is destroying the rule of law now?" Tong defended the government and Lo, and said that Kong should not have challenged Lo in public regarding legalities. Tong encouraged a judicial review, and when the judicial review deemed the government had no legal authority to invalidate the passes, the government amended the law to give Lo the power to invalidate the passes. Tong then said of the new legal power that "it is the most appropriate method to protect public health and prevent people from taking advantage of the loopholes of legislation for seeking their own profits."

In March 2023, Tong said that citizens who wear masks in areas where illegal activities are taking place may be prosecuted, saying "currently there are no medical purposes, because the government and experts all think that there is no need to wear facemasks as society is so safe. They can blame no one."

In May 2023, Tong said that a public consultation for the implementation of Article 23 should not be long, and said "... the government should maintain some principles during the consultation."

In July 2023, after the High Court ruled against the government's attempt to ban the song Glory to Hong Kong, Tong said that uploading the song would be "unwise" and "irresponsible."

=== Sports and golf ===
In August 2022, Tong said that the retreat of foreign investors away from Hong Kong was not caused by the 2019 protests or the government's COVID-19 response, but instead other fundamental problems such as lack of development in sports. Tong also claimed that Hong Kong is more democratic and open than Singapore.

Though Tong mentioned housing issues as a fundamental problem, Tong said that the government should not develop public housing on the Fanling golf course. Tong is a member of the Hong Kong Golf Club, which operates the Fanling golf course. Tong said that "I play golf all the time" and that "It’s not a sin."

In July 2023, Tong said that the government's plan to take back the land was due to "populist thinking."

=== Jimmy Lai ===
In November 2022, Tong said he was surprised by the strong reaction to news that the government would seek the help of the NPCSC to block Jimmy Lai from hiring Tim Owen after the government lost multiple appeals, and said it was understandable for the government to want Beijing to fix "a loophole" with the national security law. In December 2022, Tong backtracked and said that the Hong Kong government does not need the NPCSC interpretation to handle the issue, saying it would be overkill. Tong also said "Hong Kong has a lot of barristers holding foreign passports. Are we banning them from handling these cases as well?" and also said that he hoped the NPCSC interpretation would not apply to Lai, but only to future cases. After the NPCSC ruled that the Chief Executive could ban foreign lawyers, Tong said it was not a major issue as there were only a "miniscule [sic]" amount of cases which would be affected. In February 2023, Tong wrote that China's powers to interpret Hong Kong's laws should be "respected" by Western countries. In March 2023, Tong said that the Chief Executive should have the power to ban foreign lawyers, as the executive branch "possessed related intelligence which is often not suitable to show to the public."

In November 2023, after several Catholic leaders called for the immediate release of Lai, Tong defended the arrest of Lai and said that the Catholics had started "a not-so-subtle attack on the integrity of our judges," and "...the petition should be considered political propaganda."

== Honours and awards ==
- Grand Bauhinia Star (2022)
- Justice of the Peace (2018)

== See also ==
- Centrist camp

Legal offices
Preceded by Audrey Eu	Chairman of the Hong Kong Bar Association; 1999–2001	Succeeded by Alan Leong
Legislative Council of Hong Kong
New seat	Member of the Legislative Council; Representative for New Territories East; 2004–2015	Succeeded by Alvin Yeung
Order of precedence
Preceded by Regina Ip; Member of the Executive Council	Hong Kong order of precedence Member of the Executive Council	Succeeded by Wong Kwok-kin; Member of the Executive Council
