= Democratic Self-Government Party of Hong Kong =

Democratic Self-Government Party of Hong Kong 香港民主自治黨
- Chairman: P. A. Gass; Chang Liu-shih
- Founded: 12 November 1964
- Ideology: Anti-colonialism; Anti-communism; Social democracy
- Political position: Centre-left to left-wing

Democratic Self-Government Party of Hong Kong
- Traditional Chinese: 香港民主自治黨
Transcriptions
Yue: Cantonese
- Yale Romanization: Hēung góng màhn jyú jih chìh dóng
- Jyutping: Hoeng1 gong2 man4 zyu2 zi6 ci4 dong4

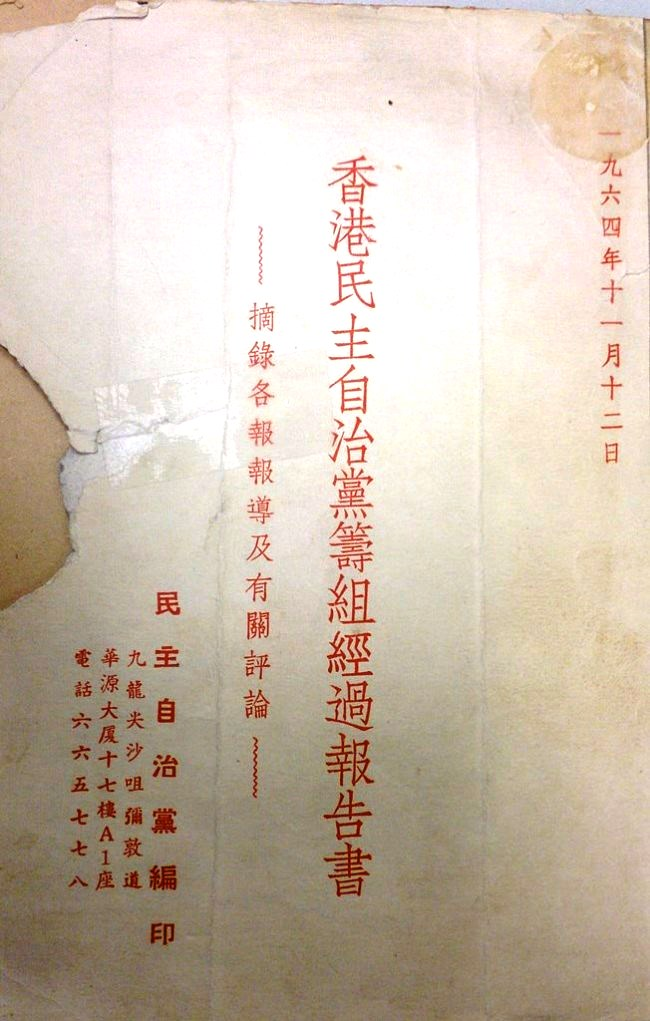
Report on the Formation of the Hong Kong Democratic Self-Government Party

The Democratic Self-Government Party of Hong Kong was the first political party calling for self-government in Hong Kong established in 1964. it was founded by Ma Man-fai, chairman of the United Nations Association of Hong Kong, lawyer Chang Liu-shih and teacher K. Hopkin-Jenkins.

It pressed for self-government in Hong Kong, demanding direction election to the Legislative Council of Hong Kong and formation of the government by the party who received the most votes in a general election. It also called for the Governor, who would only hold the ceremonial role, to be appointed by the Queen only after the consultation with the elected Chief Minister of Hong Kong, except for diplomatic relations and regional defence in which the British government would be responsible for.

The party was formed and registered with the Hong Kong government on 9 October 1963 but was officially established until 12 November 1964. Before the official establishment, Ma Man-fai, one of the founders was stripped off from the chairmanship along with K. Hopkin-Jenkins. Hopkin-Jenkins later founded another party Labour Party of Hong Kong. Some other members also left the party to found the Hong Kong Socialist Democratic Party led by former Kuomintang general Sun Pao-kang.
