= PoD Research Institute =

PoD Research Institute 民思政策研究所
- Convenor: Ronny Tong
- Co-Convenor: Allan Wong
- Founded: 8 June 2015
- Split from: Civic Party
- Ideology: Centrism (HK); Formerly: Liberalism (HK)
- Colours: Violet
- Executive Council: 1 / 33
- Legislative Council: 0 / 90
- District Councils: 1 / 470

Website
- podresearch.hk

PoD Research Institute (Chinese: 民思政策研究所) is a think tank established in 2015 in Hong Kong. Formerly known as Path of Democracy (PoD, Chinese: 民主思路), it is led by former Civic Party legislator Ronny Tong, who joined the Executive Council in 2017. Although officially unaligned with either the pro-Beijing camp or the pro-democracy camp, the group has been supportive of the policies and legislation put forward by the former, and was allowed to join the "patriots-only" legislative election. It rebranded itself as a think tank and adopted its current name on 15 September 2025.

== History ==
=== Founding (2015–16) ===
Path of Democracy was founded by Ronny Tong Ka-wah, a barrister, the founding member of the pro-democracy Civic Party, and member of Legislative Council, who was disillusioned with pan-democrats' uncompromising approach toward Beijing on democratic reform. Tong came up with his own moderate proposal in October 2013 as opposed to pan-democrats' Alliance for True Democracy proposal. Tong's proposal failed to be adopted by the government as the National People's Congress Standing Committee (NPCSC) set limits on the electoral reform on 31 August 2014 which eventually led to the ultimate veto by the pan-democrats in the Legislative Council in June 2015, in which Tong voted against the proposal with the Civic Party. On 8 June 2015, before the vote, he set up a think tank Path of Democracy, composed of moderate democrats. After the vote, he announced his resignation from both the Civic Party and the Legislative Council.

The group was set up on 8 June 2015 with 18 founding members from a wide range of sectors, including political science professors Joseph Chan Cho-wai and Ray Yep Kin-man who would conduct research. Former Secretary for Civil Service Joseph Wong Wing-ping, barrister Jat Sew-tong, Centaline founder Shih Wing-ching, businessman Allan Zeman were the four honorary advisers to the think tank. Scholars Cheung Chor-yung and Derek Yuen became the Secretary General and Chief Executive Officer of the group. Other members included former chairman of the Hong Kong Democratic Foundation Alan Lung, economists Sung Yun-wing and Richard Wong and Southern District Councillor Paul Zimmerman. The group was seen to be tasked to bridge the pro-democracy camp and the Chinese government after the rift caused by the political reform.

=== Increasingly pro-government alignment (2016–20) ===
Path of Democracy became increasingly involved in political roles and was seen to have positioned themselves more as a political party siding with the democrats. In the following months Ronny Tong commented on various contemporary issues and met Chinese officials in Beijing. They joined the 2016 Legislative Council election, but failed to get any of its candidates elected. In July 2017, Ronny Tong was appointed to the Executive Council by Carrie Lam. Tong's pro-government stance drew ire from democrats and within the group. Many founding leaders left the group subsequently, including democrat-friendly co-convenors Joseph Chan and Ray Yep. Two other co-convenors Larry Lai and Lau Pui-wing resigned over personal reasons and for joining Carrie Lam's campaign team. Derek Yuen, the secretary-general, also left Path of Democracy.

Delegation of Path of Democracy paid a visit to Beijing in 2018 and 2019. During the anti-extradition bill demonstrations, Tong defended the government but faced criticism for abandoning the centrism role of PoD. A mass exodus followed, with three co-convenors Mak Ka-chun, Gary Wong Chi-him, Sung Yun-wing leaving the party. Political assistant of Commerce Secretary Elizabeth Fung and Sung's wife the former secretary-general also left.

=== After the national security law (2020–) ===
After the National Security Law was enacted by Beijing in 2020, and the 2021 electoral changes barred democrats from being elected to public offices. In 2021 election the party, partnering another moderate group Third Side, did not manage to win a seat in the legislature after only one member was successfully nominated after a difficult nomination period. The local elections two years later saw again only one member nominated and defeated, although one of the party members was later appointed to the District Council.

In September 2025 Path of Democracy announced a name change to "PoD Research Institute" to shake off its image as political group. Tong said they have always positioned Path of Democracy as a policy research organisation since its foundation, but the word "democracy" in the name had led to misunderstanding in society that they are a political party and political connotation that may impact the credibility of the research. However, the renaming raised speculation that the moderates would also be ousted from legislative races.

== Beliefs ==
The group states that it seeks to maximise democratic development within the limits of the "one country, two systems" principle of Hong Kong people ruling Hong Kong and a high degree of autonomy, by a moderate approach, which includes:

- To consolidate the majority of supporters of the democratic camp in the society;
- To promote a moderate political approach in a proactive manner, and to carve out new political horizon in the society;
- To formulate agenda and construct systematic political discourse;
- To establish new ideological dimensions in the politics, society, economics and culture of the Hong Kong Special Administrative Region together with different stakeholders through research, dialogue and engagement.

In September 2022, it lobbied the government to:

- Enact laws against "fake news",
- Provide HK$5000/month in housing subsidies to mainland Chinese students who graduate from a Hong Kong university and wish to settle in Hong Kong,
- Offer "professional development courses" to Hong Kong teachers to be trained in mainland China, and
- To introduce Simplified Chinese in schools, instead of Traditional Chinese

== Election results ==
=== Legislative council elections ===
Election	Number of popular votes	% of popular votes	GC seats	FC seats	EC seats	Total seats	+/−	Position
2016	18,112	0.84	0	0		0 / 70	–	–
2021	8,159▼	0.62▼	0	0	0	0 / 90	Steady	Steady
2025	15,806▲	1.20▲	0	0	0	0 / 90	Steady	Steady

== See also ==
- Third Side
- Civic Party
- Professional Power
