= 2016 Democratic Party (HK) leadership election =

Democratic Party (HK) leadership election
- 4 December 2016
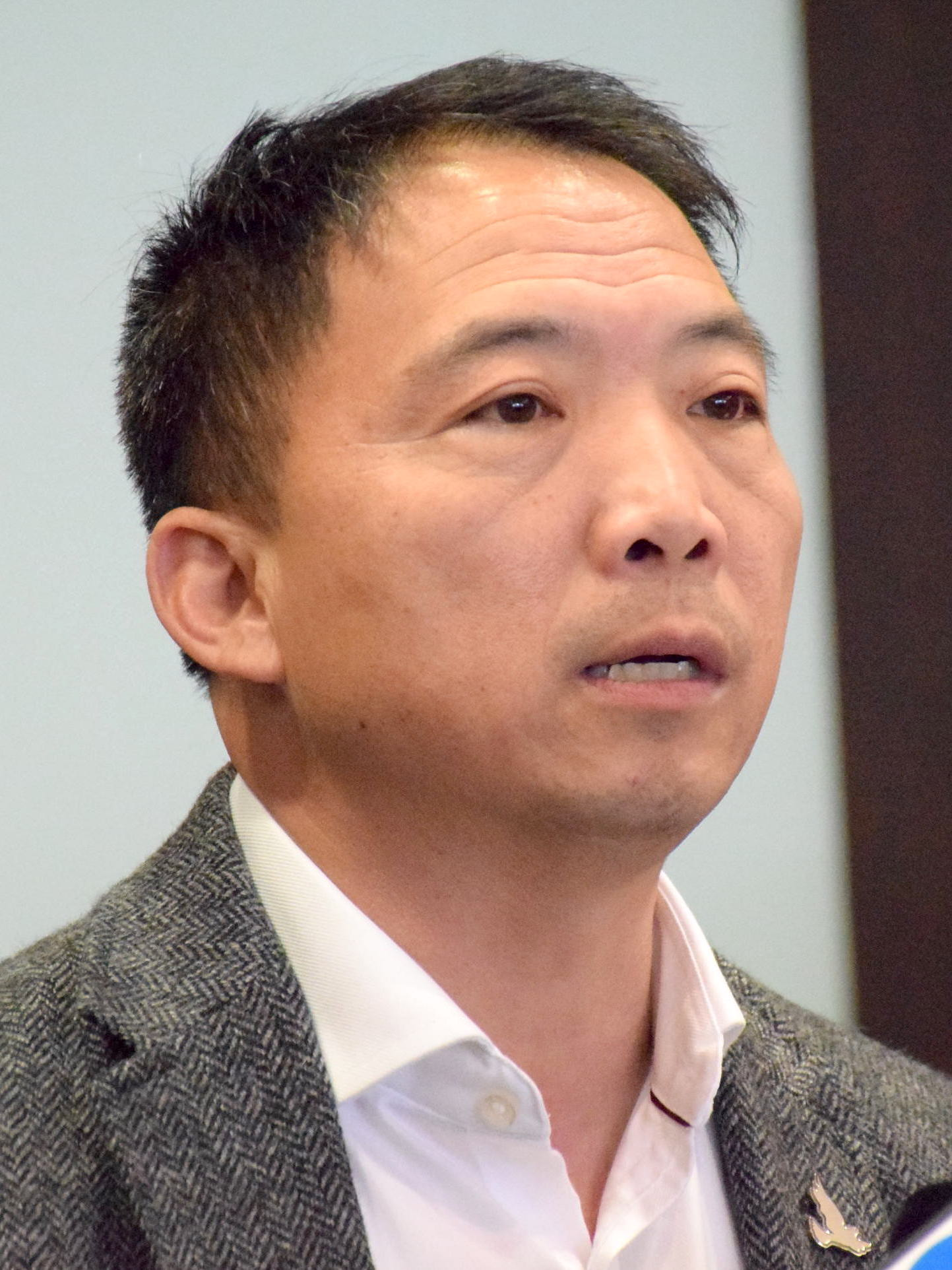
Candidate	Wu Chi-wai
Ballot	282
Percentage	92%
Chairperson before election
Emily Lau
Elected Chairperson
Wu Chi-wai

The Democratic Party leadership election was held on 4 December 2016 for the 30-member 12th Central Committee of the Democratic Party in Hong Kong, including chairperson and two vice-chairperson posts.

Incumbent chairwoman Emily Lau, former member of the Legislative Council of Hong Kong who retired in October 2016 announced her retirement from the post and was succeeded by Wu Chi-wai, member of the Legislative Council for Kowloon East, who was elected unopposed, which made it the first uncontested leadership election since 2010.

== Electoral method ==
The Central Committee was elected by the party congress. All public office holders, including the members of the Legislative Council and District Councils, are eligible to vote in the party congress. The eligibility of members electing a delegate who holds one vote in the congress was 5 members. Candidate also needs a majority in order to claim victory.

== Overview ==
The election came after the 2016 Legislative Council election, in which incumbent chairwoman Emily Lau and other veterans stepped down and make way for the young candidates. Lau also said she would not seek for re-election for the chair post, although there were some members petitioned to nominate Lau for another term.

Although the party had earlier passed a motion to create a party leader post in order to divide the roles between party organ and parliamentary caucus, Legislative Council member Wu Chi-wai became the only candidate for the chairmanship while another interested candidate, incumbent vice-chairman Lo Kin-hei chose to run for vice-chairmanship with incumbent secretary Li Wing-shing. Endorsing Wu, Lo said Wu was the best candidate to convince the party to implement the division of the roles.

== Candidates ==
=== Chairperson ===
- Wu Chi-wai, Executive Committee member of the Democratic Party, Legislative Council member for Kowloon East and Wong Tai Sin District Councillor

=== Vice-Chairpersons ===
- Howard Lam Tsz-kin, Central Committee member of the Democratic Party
- Li Wing-shing, incumbent Secretary of the Democratic Party and Sha Tin District Councillor
- Lo Kin-hei, incumbent Vice-Chairman of the Democratic Party and Southern District Councillor

== Elections ==
Chairperson election
Candidate	For	Against	Abstention	% of votes
Wu Chi-wai	282	12	10	92

Vice-Chairperson election
Candidate	Votes
Lo Kin-hei	222
Li Wing-shing	209

== Results ==
The elected members of the 12th Central Committee are listed as following:

- Chairman: Wu Chi-wai
- Vice-Chairmen: Lo Kin-hei, Li Wing-shing
- Treasurer: Yuen Hoi-man
- Secretary: Cheung Yin-tung
- Executive Committee Members:

- Chai Man-hon
- Joseph Chow Kam-siu
- Chu Shun-nga
- Joshua Fung Man-tao
- Lam Ka-ka
- Lee Wing-tat
- Mok Kin-shing
- Tsoi Yiu-cheong
- Andrew Wan Siu-kin
- Wong Kin-shing

- Central Committee Members:

- Cheung Man-kwong
- Wilfred Chong Wing-fai
- Ho Chi-wai
- Ho Chun-yan
- Hui Chi-fung
- Lam Cheuk-ting
- Leung Wing-kuen
- Mark Li Kin-yin
- Bonnie Ng Hoi-yan
- Stanley Ng Wing-fai
- Ting Tsz-yuen
- Tsui Hon-kwong
- Catherine Wong Lai-sheung
- Wong Pik-wan
- Yeung Sum
