= 2014 Democratic Party (HK) leadership election =

Democratic Party (HK) leadership election
- 14 December 2014
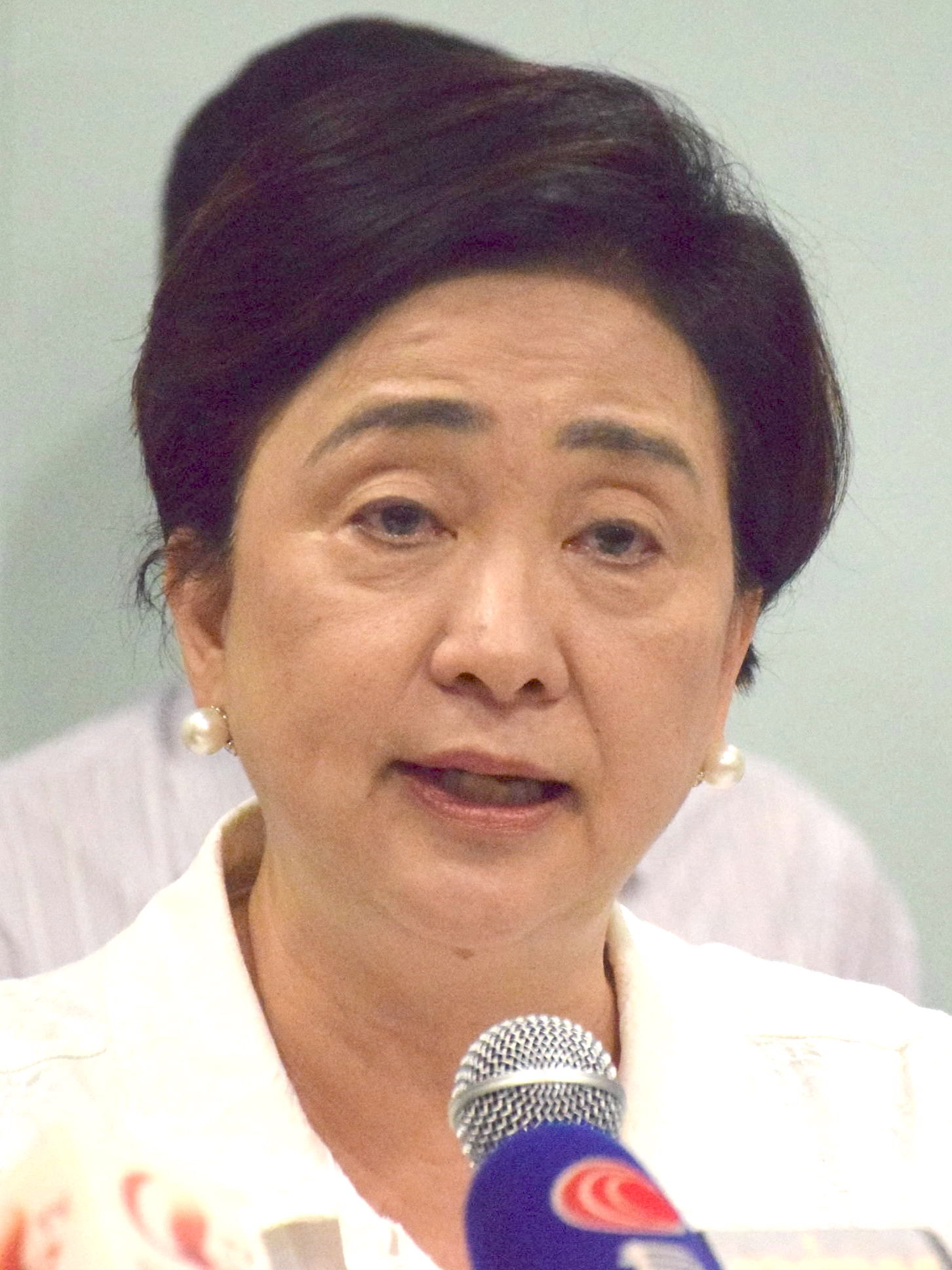

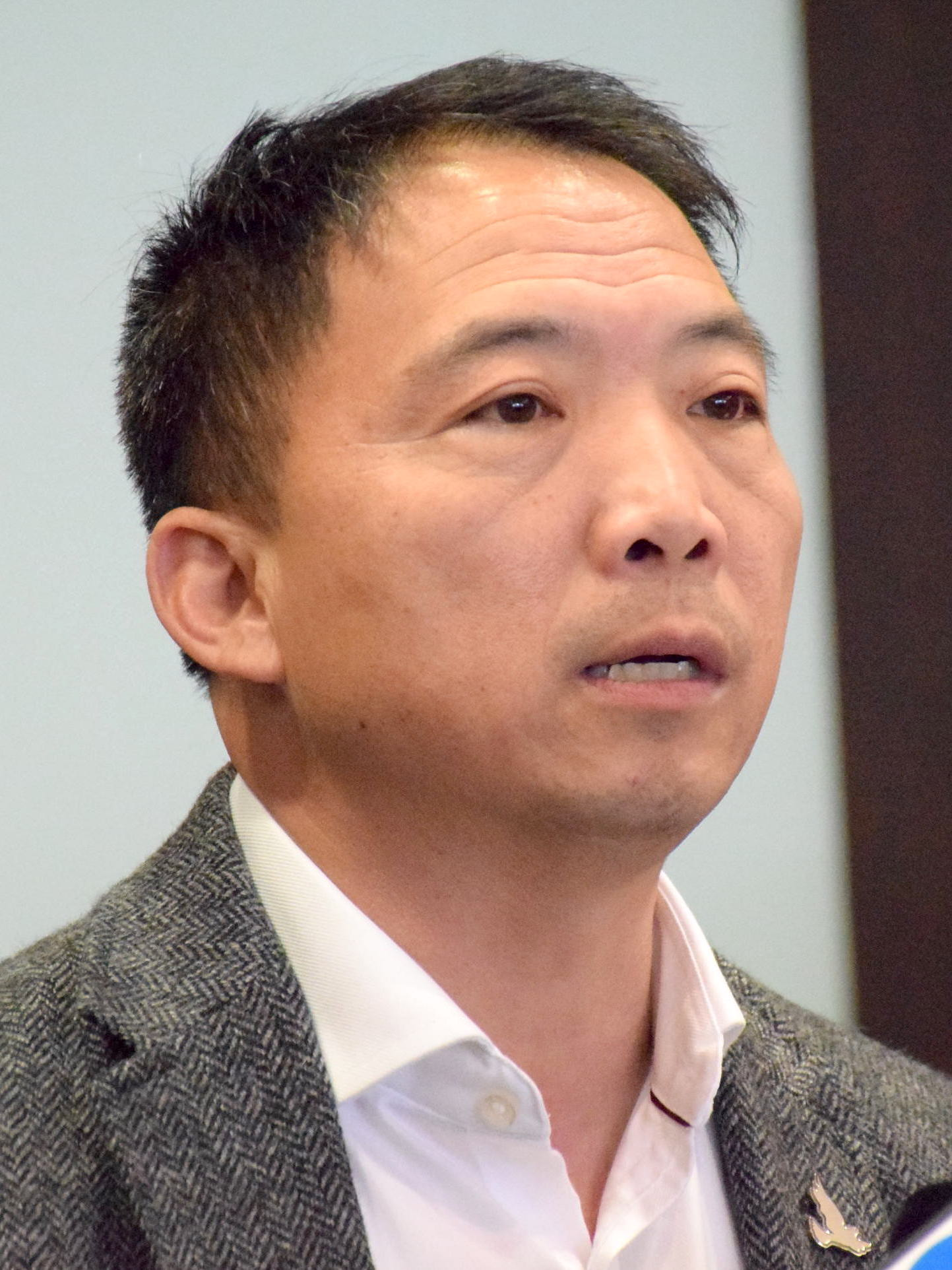

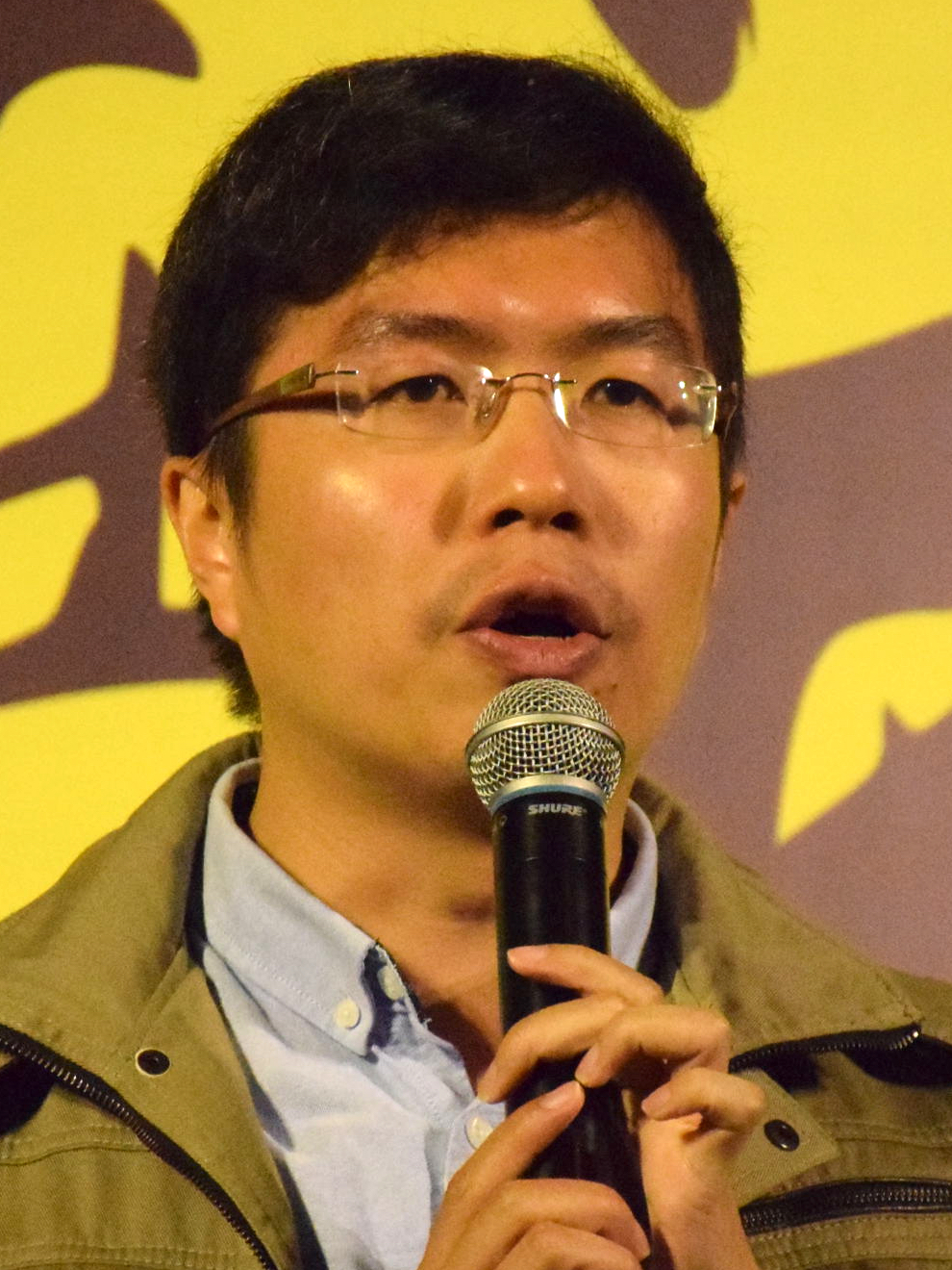

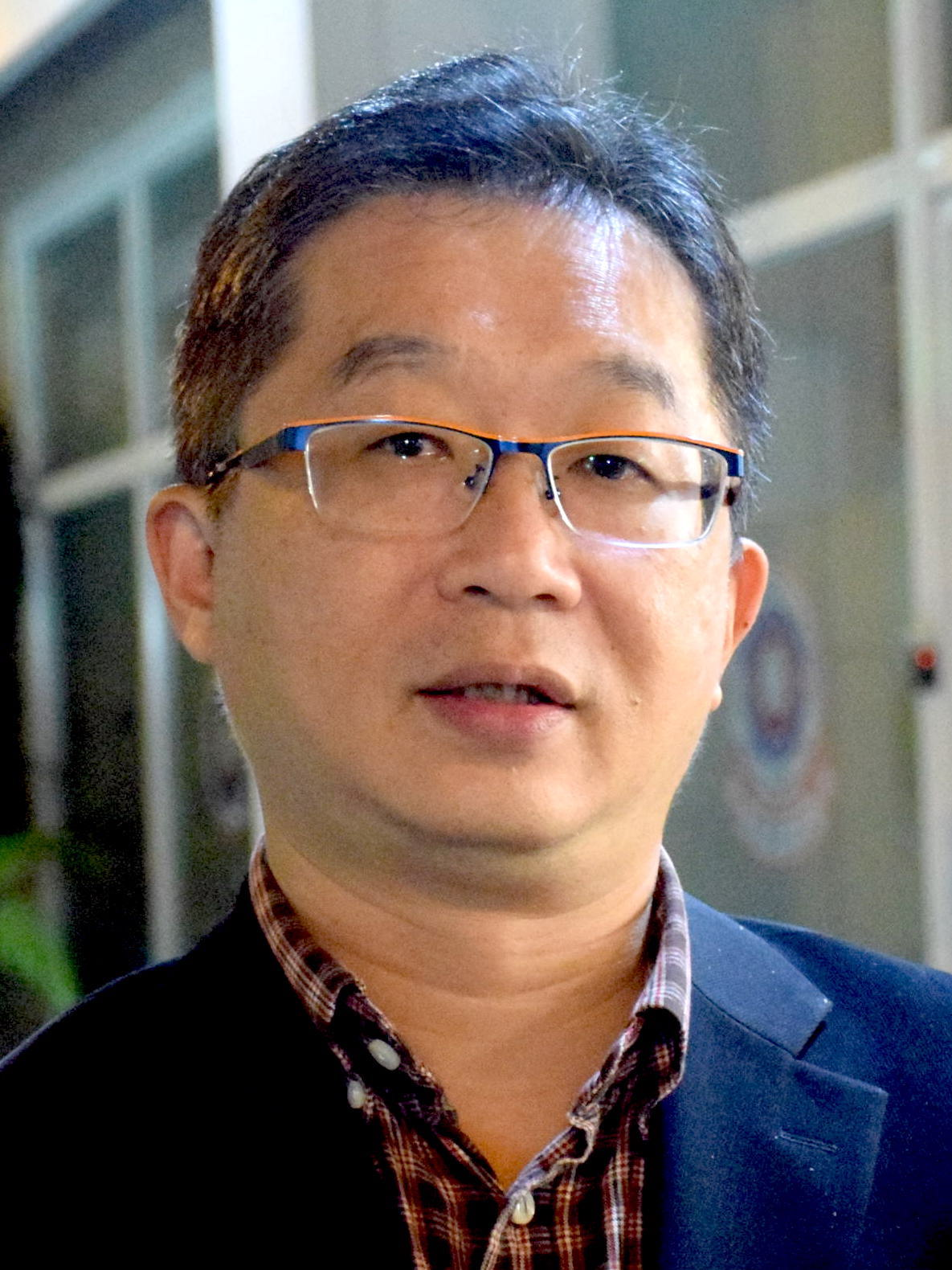
Candidate	Emily Lau	Wu Chi-wai
1st ballot	158 (50.0%)	104 (32.9%)
2nd ballot	171 (54.1%)	145 (45.9%)
Candidate	Au Nok-hin	Stanley Ng
1st ballot	33 (10.4%)	21 (6.6%)
2nd ballot	Eliminated	Eliminated
Chairperson before election
Emily Lau
Elected Chairperson
Emily Lau

The Democratic Party leadership election was held on 14 December 2012 for the 30-member 11th Central Committee of the Democratic Party in Hong Kong, including chairperson and two vice-chairperson posts. Incumbent Chairperson Emily Lau secured her post against three other candidates after two rounds of election.

== Electoral method ==
The Central Committee was elected by the party congress. All public office holders, including the members of the Legislative Council and District Councils, are eligible to vote in the party congress. The electoral method changed in this election, the eligibility of members electing a delegate who holds one vote in the congress from 30 members each delegate to only 5 members. Candidate also needs a majority in order to claim victory.

== Overview ==
The election was held right after the Umbrella Movement was cleared out. The 20-year-old Democratic Party sought to reposition itself in the post-Occupy era in which the young generation took a big role.

Emily Lau, Legislative Councillor since 1991, is the incumbent chairwoman who took the post in the 2012 leadership election. She said she would put more efforts into the district works and electoral campaign.

Lau faced challenges from three other candidates. Wu Chi-wai, Legislative Councillor since 2012 and a long-time Wong Tai Sin District Councillor stressed the importance of the repositioning of the party after the post-Occupy era and taking a leading role in the district works. Stanley Ng, incumbent Treasurer of the party and town planner by profession suggested reform on party's structure, adding the posts of party leader and also deputy secretary. Au Nok-hin who was 27 years old from the young generation, ran for the chairmanship for the second consecutive term. Au was among the vanguard of the youngsters over the fence on 26 September, part of the group launching the Occupation of Civic Plaza, leading to the full blown Umbrella movement.

== Candidates ==
=== Chairperson ===
- Emily Lau, incumbent Chairwoman of the Democratic Party and Legislative Council member for New Territories East
- Wu Chi-wai, Executive Committee member of the Democratic Party, Legislative Council member for Kowloon East and Wong Tai Sin District Councillor
- Stanley Ng, Treasurer of the Democratic Party and Deputy Chair of Professional Commons
- Au Nok-hin, Executive Committee member of the Democratic Party and Southern District Councillor

=== Vice-Chairpersons ===
- Lo Kin-hei, incumbent vice-chairman of the Democratic Party and Southern District Councillor
- Andrew Wan, Executive Committee member of the Democratic Party and Kwai Tsing District Councillor
- Stanley Ng, Treasurer of the Democratic Party

== Elections ==
Chairperson election
First round			Second round	
Candidate	Votes	%	Votes	%
Emily Lau Wai-hing	158	50.0	171	54.1
Wu Chi-wai	104	32.9	145	45.9
Au Nok-hin	33	10.4	–	
Stanley Ng Wing-fai	21	6.6	–	

Vice-chairperson election
Candidate	Votes	%
Lo Kin-hei	263	44.1
Andrew Wan Siu-kin	254	42.5
Stanley Ng Wing-fai	80	5.3

== Results ==
The elected members of the 11th Central Committee are listed as following:

- Chairlady: Emily Lau
- Vice-chairmen: Lo Kin-hei, Andrew Wan Siu-kin
- Treasurer: Yuen Hoi-man
- Secretary: Li Wing-shing
- Vice-secretary: Mark Li Kin-yin
- Executive Committee Members:

- Au Nok-hin
- Chow Kam-siu
- Hui Chi-fung
- Lai King-wai
- Ng Wing-fai
- Ricky Or Yiu-lam
- Tam Chun-kit
- Tsoi Yu-lung

- Central Committee Members:

- Chai Man-hon
- Josephine Chan Shu-ying
- Cheung Man-kwong
- Cheung Yin-tung
- Ho Chi-wai
- Ho Chun-yan
- Kwong Chun-yu
- Lam Chung-hoi
- Lee Wing-tat
- Mok Kin-shing
- Tsoi Yiu-cheong
- Tsui Hon-kwong
- Sin Chung-kai
- Wong Pik-wan
- Wong Sing-chi
- Yeung Sum

== Aftermath ==
After winning the election, Emily Lau noted that the Democrats were very concerned about waning support among young people and called for party to focus on younger generation, working on strategies to engage young people, such as through university student unions and also make more use of social media.

Re-elected vice-chairman Lo Kin-hei said, "Voting for Lau should not be interpreted as a lack of motivation for changes in the party. Instead, it means Lau is more experienced in leading the party in the current political environment."

On 23 January 2015, secretary general Cheung Yin-tung and his disciple Kwong Chun-yu resigned their positions on the Central Committee. Some speculated their disaffections towards the dominance of the Mainstreamer faction led by the "triumvirate", Yeung Sum, Cheung Man-kwong and Lee Wing-tat.

In July 2015, former legislator and member of the party central committee Wong Sing-chi was expelled from the Democratic Party due to his defiance of the party line and clandestine proposal in support of the government's constitutional reform package, which was panned by pan-democrats for being "fake universal suffrage".

== 2015 by-election ==
A by-election for the three vacancies in the Central Committee was held in the annual party congress on 6 December 2015. Founding member Howard Lam Tsz-kin, Lam Ka-ka and Chau Man-fong who were considered in Chai Man-hon's faction were elected, while Ng Siu-hong of the Hui Chi-fung's faction was not elected. Chai and Ng were considered potential candidates for running in Hong Kong Island in the 2016 Legislative Council election.
