= 2016 Democratic Party (HK) primaries =

Democratic Party's primary results
Constituency	Candidate(s)
Hong Kong Island	Ted Hui Chi-fung
Kowloon West	Helena Wong Pik-wan
Kowloon East	Wu Chi-wai
New Territories West	Andrew Wan Siu-kin
New Territories East	Lam Cheuk-ting
District Council (Second)	James To Kun-sun
District Council (Second)	Roy Kwong Chun-yu

The 2016 Democratic Party pre-election primaries are to select the Democratic Party's candidates for the 2016 Legislative Council election. The candidacy was decided 60% by opinion polling, 20% by party's district branches and 20% by each district's district councillors and finalised in a voting in the special party congress on 24 April 2016. Seven candidate lists were decided in which James To, Helena Wong and Wu Chi-wai would seek for re-election in their respective constituencies, while chairwoman Emily Lau, Albert Ho and Sin Chung-kai would retire and succeeded by new faces Lam Cheuk-ting, Roy Kwong, Ted Hui and Andrew Wan.

== Background ==
The Democratic Party has held intra-party primaries according to the opinion polls in the previous Legislative Council elections. In the previous mechanism, the candidacy was decided 60% by opinion polling, 20% by party's district branches and 20% by each district's district councillors. It was reverted to 8:1:1 after the 2004 Legislative Council election due to the criticism of too much influence of the party.

The unprecedented primary proposal was suggested by chairwoman Emily Lau to hold public debates to select the candidacy before the party's voting. Lau said her idea was borrowed from the United States presidential primaries and believed such forums, which would be open to the public and the press, would greatly increase the transparency of the races. The plan of public debates were later cancelled.

The annual party congress on 6 December 2015 primarily agreed on the pre-election primary proposal. On the congress, the party's electoral committee suggested to have only one ticket for each geographical constituency while two for the District Council (Second) "super seats". Former legislator Lee Wing-tat who lost in New Territories West expressed the worry of losing both lists if the party put forward two candidate lists as they did in the 2012 Legislative Council election. Zachary Wong Wai-yin, veteran Yuen Long District Council member suggested to modify the maximum candidate list for New Territories West and New Territories East from one to two, which agreed by 2012 New Territories West candidate Josephine Chan Shu-ying. The motion eventually passed with 62 for 61 against. The idea of fielding two lists in New Territories East and West was eventually dismissed by many as too risky.

The pre-election primary mechanism was also reverted to the pre-2004 6:2:2 ratio with 81 for 37 against to help the non-incumbent candidates who is disadvantaged by in the opinion polls compared to the publicity of the incumbent candidates would enjoy.

== Candidates ==
After the nomination period from 10 to 31 December, a total number of 14 nominations was received. The nominations surprised the media as long-time legislator and incumbent chairwoman Emily Lau decided not to run for an eighth term. The other incumbents who would not seek for re-election included Albert Ho of District Council (Second) and Sin Chung-kai of Hong Kong Island. Another surprise was the two rising stars Southern District Councillors Lo Kin-hei, who is also party's vice chairman, and Henry Chai Man-hon, have both given up contesting the Legislative Council elections.

=== Hong Kong Island ===
- Winfield Chong Wing-fai, four-time candidate of the Central and Western District Council election
- Ted Hui Chi-fung, Central and Western District Council member

=== Kowloon West ===
- Helena Wong Pik-wan, incumbent Legislative Council member for Kowloon West
- Ramon Yuen Hoi-man, Sham Shui Po District Council member and Kowloon West Branch chairman

=== Kowloon East ===
- Wu Chi-wai, incumbent Legislative Council member for Kowloon East and Wong Tai Sin District Council

=== New Territories West ===
- Josephine Chan Shu-ying, former Tuen Mun District Council member (1994–2015)
- Roy Kwong Chun-yu, Yuen Long District Council member and romance novelist (withdrawn in April 2016)
- Andrew Wan Siu-kin, vice chairman of the Democratic Party and former Kwai Tsing District Council member (2004–2015)

=== New Territories East ===
- Au Chun-wah, Tai Po District Council member
- Lam Cheuk-ting, chief executive officer of the Democratic Party and North District Council member
- Joanne Leung Wing-yan, LGBT activist

=== District Council (Second) ===
- Ted Hui Chi-fung, Central and Western District Council member (withdrew in January 2016)
- Roy Kwong Chun-yu, Yuen Long District Council member and romance novelist
- James To Kun-sun, incumbent Legislative Council member for District Council (Second) and Yau Tsim Mong District Council member

== Results ==
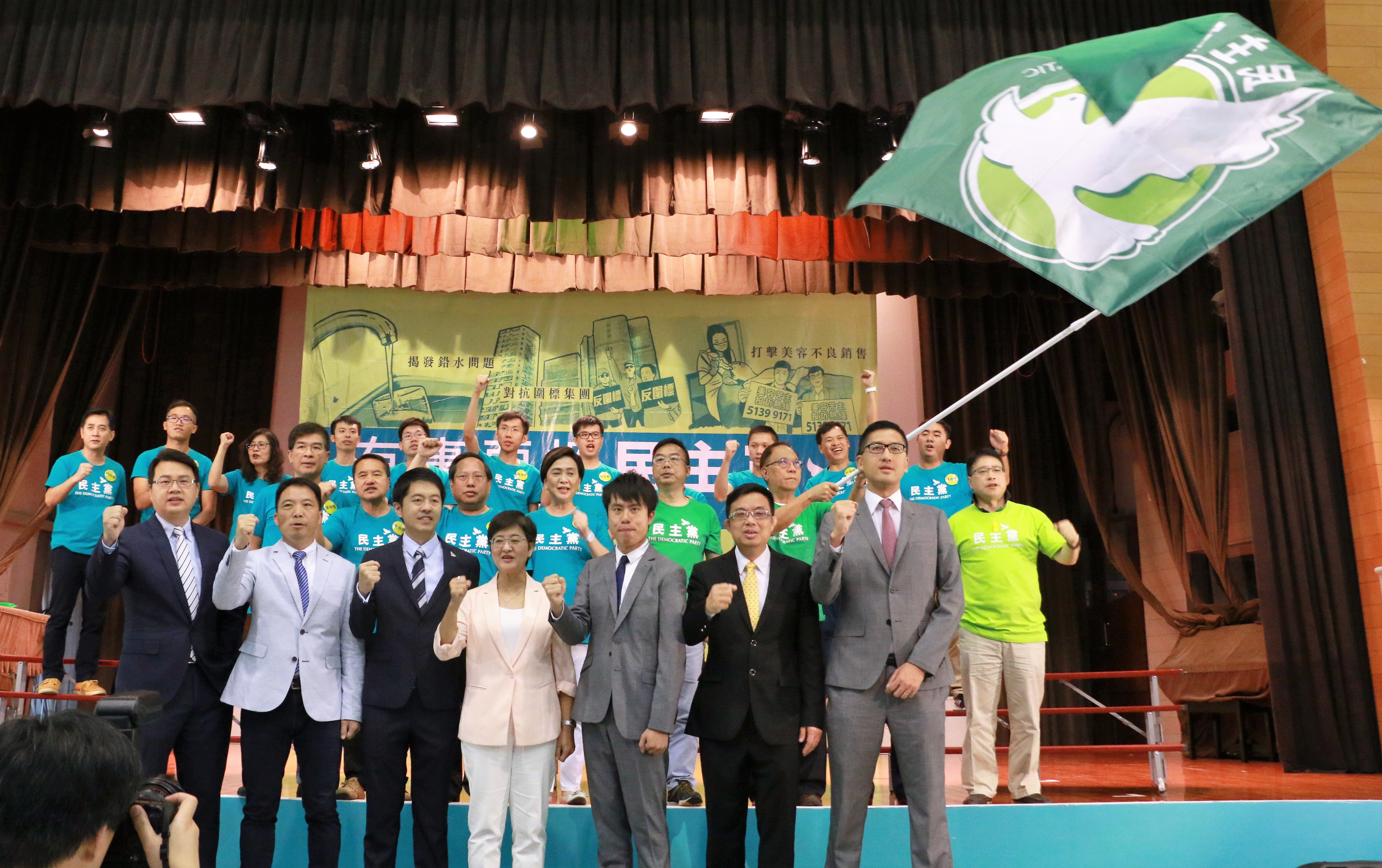
Democratic Party election rally in July 2016.

Candidates	Ranking		
Candidates	Opinion polls	District Branches	District Councillors
Hong Kong Island (1 list)
Ted Hui Chi-fung	1st	2nd	2nd
Winfield Chong Wing-fai	2nd	1st	1st
Kowloon West (1 list)
Helena Wong Pik-wan	1st	1st	1st
Ramon Yuen Hoi-man	2nd	2nd	2nd
Kowloon East (1 list)
Wu Chi-wai	uncontested		
New Territories West (1 list)
Andrew Wan Siu-kin	1st	1st	1st
Josephine Chan Shu-ying	2nd	2nd	2nd
New Territories East (1 list)
Lam Cheuk-ting	2nd	2nd	1st
Joanne Leung Wing-yan	1st	3rd	3rd
Au Chun-wah	3rd	1st	2nd
District Council (Second) (2 lists)
James To Kun-sun	1st	1st	1st
Roy Kwong Chun-yu	2nd	2nd	2nd
