= 2012 Democratic Party (HK) leadership election =

Democratic Party (HK) leadership election
- 16 December 2012
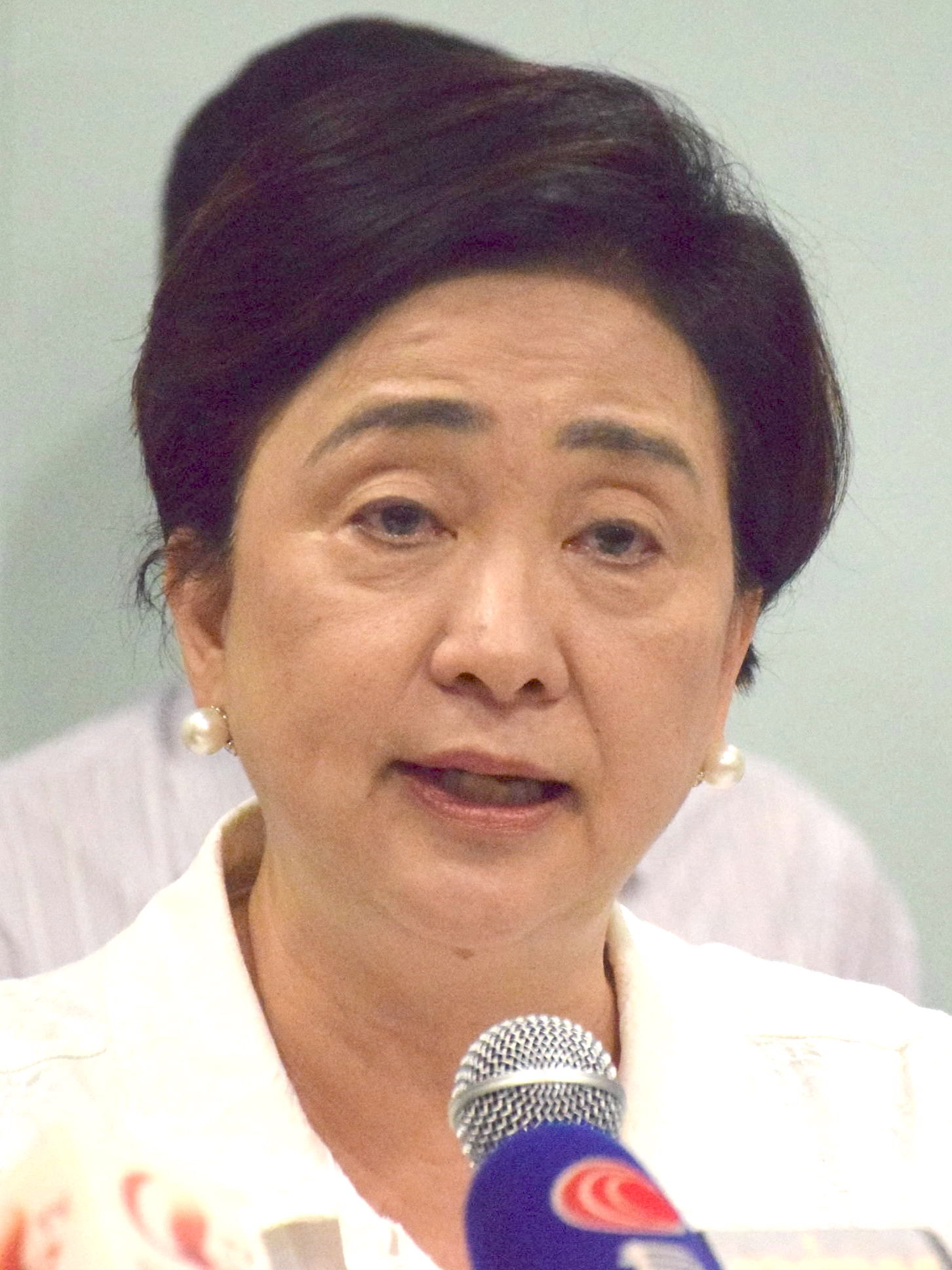

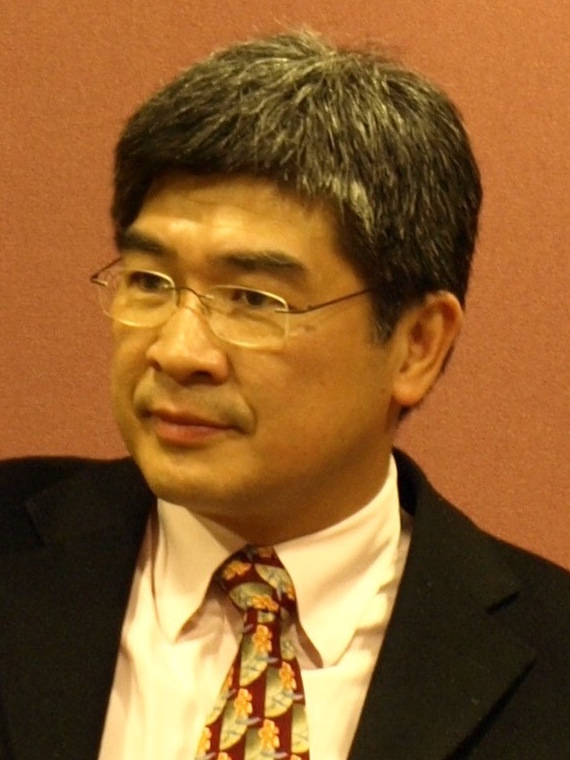

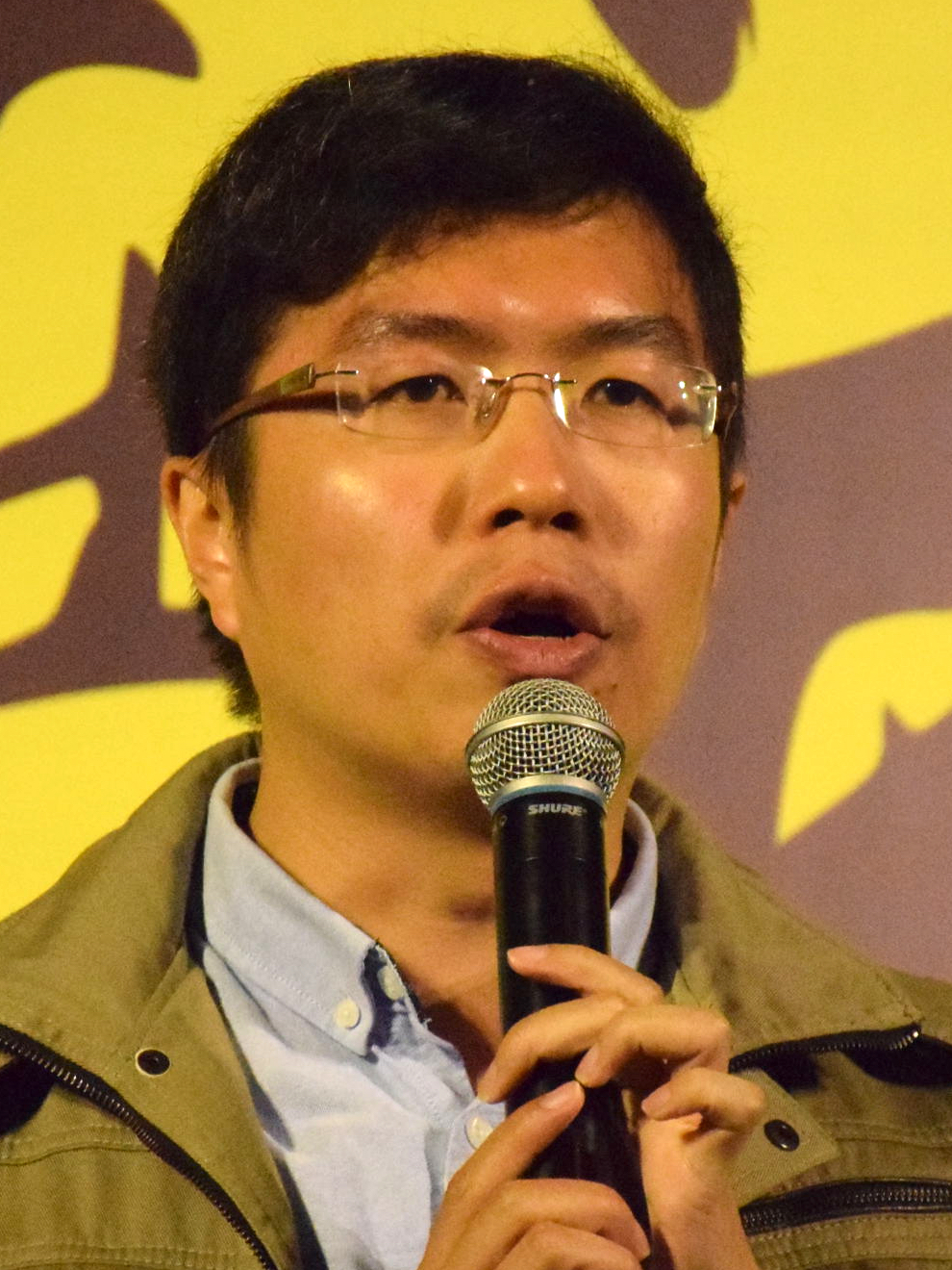
Candidate	Emily Lau	Sin Chung-kai	Au Nok-hin
Ballot	149	133	14
Percentage	50.3%	44.9%	4.7%
Chairman before election
Emily Lau (acting)
Elected Chairman
Emily Lau

The Democratic Party leadership election was held on 16 December 2012 for the 30-member 10th Central Committee of the Democratic Party in Hong Kong, including chairman and two vice-chairman posts. The incumbent acting Chairwomen Emily Lau defeated Vice-Chairman Sin Chung-kai by a narrow margin, becoming the first Chairwoman of the party. 300 party members voted in the election.

== Eligibility ==
The Central Committee was elected by the party congress. All public office holders, including the members of the Legislative Council and District Councils, are eligible to vote in the party congress. Every 30 members can also elect a delegate who holds one vote in the congress.

== Overview ==
After the devastating defeat in the 2012 Legislative Council election, Chairman Albert Ho resigned as leader, citing failure to present a united front for the pan-democratic camp, failure to retain seats from the previous elections, and infighting between pro-democracy parties. The chairmanship was temporarily taken over by vice-chairwoman Emily Lau until the leadership election in the end of the year.

Emily Lau, prominent figure in the pro-democracy camp who had been legislator for New Territories East since 1991 only joined and became one of the two Vice-Chairmen of the Democratic Party in 2008 after she quit her group the Frontier as founding convenor. Emily Lau decided to run in last-minute candidate after repeatedly saying she would not run.

Tho other vice-chairman Sin Chung-kai was the founding member of the party had returned into the LegCo in 2012 for Hong Kong Island after serving as the representative of the Information Technology functional constituency for ten years. Sin headed a 12-member team with the slogan "breakthrough, reform, democracy". The Team included Richard Tsoi Yiu-cheong and Lo Kin-hei who were contested for the two Vice-Chairman posts.

Southern District Councillor Au Nok-hin who was 25 years old, joined the party in 2009 and was elected a district councillor in 2011. Au ran for the Chairman post but he said he knew he had little chance of winning but wanted to demonstrate the party did not have a "big brother culture".

== Candidates ==
=== Chairman ===
- Emily Lau, Legislative Council member for New Territories East and acting Chairwoman of the Democratic Party
- Sin Chung-kai, Legislative Council member for Hong Kong Island and Vice-Chairman of the Democratic Party
- Au Nok-hin, Southern District Councillor

=== Vice-Chairmen ===
- Richard Tsoi, Democratic Party's Community Officer of the New Territories East Branch
- Lo Kin-hei, Southern District Councillor
- Wu Chi-wai, Legislative Council member for Kowloon East and member of the Central Committee

== Elections ==
Chairman election
Candidate	Votes	%
Emily Lau Wai-hing	149	50.3
Sin Chung-kai	133	44.9
Au Nok-hin	14	4.7

Vice-Chairmen election
Candidate	Votes	%
Richard Tsoi Yiu-cheong	189	35.8
Lo Kin-hei	173	32.8
Wu Chi-wai	166	31.4

Central Committee election
Candidate	Votes
Wu Chi-wai	260
Albert Ho Chun-yan	258
Sin Chung-kai	247
Yeung Sum	218
Cheung Man-kwong	214
Josephine Chan Shu-ying	210
Helena Wong Pik-wan	209
Tam Chun-kit	204
Cheung Yin-tung	196
Au Nok-hin	188
Andrew Wan Siu-kin	184
Ng Wing-fai	181
Ricky Or Yiu-lam	181
Yuen Hoi-man	175
Chai Man-hon	159
Li Wing-shing	158
Lai King-wai	155
Lam Chung-hoi	155
Lee Wing-tat	155
Kwong Chun-yu	147
Andrew Chiu Ka-yin	145
Mark Li Kin-yin	144
Christopher Tsoi Yu-lung	137
Wong Sing-chi	135
Tsui Hon-kwong	134
Eric Lam Lap-chi	128
Joseph Chow Kam-siu	126
Ray-Joshua Au Chun-wah	124
Wong King-fong	113
Leung Ka-yu	112
Edmond Lau Chun-yip	106
Ying Wing-ho	92
Edmund Lee Kin-man	88
Chiu Chung-lam	83
Lam Wai-kei	80
Jimmy Law Sai-yan	78
Lam Ho-yeung	73
Chui Pak-tai	72
Lam Wing-yin	66
Lam Hon-kin	43
Joanna Leung Suk-ching	40
Li Hung-por	27
Andrew Lo Chung-park	19

== Results ==
The incumbent acting Chairwomen Emily Lau defeated Vice-Chairman Sin Chung-kai by a narrow margin, becoming the first Chairwoman of the party. Nevertheless, Richard Tsoi Yiu-cheong and Lo Kin-hei were both elected as Vice-Chairmen, by defeating legislator Wu Chi-wai for Kowloon East. Wu still won the most votes for a seat on the Central Committee. Lo, 28 years old, became the youngest Vice-Chairman of the party's history. 11 of the 30 new central committee members were under 40 years old with the average age of 44, 4 years younger than the last committee.

The elected members of the 10th Central Committee are listed as following:

- Chairlady: Emily Lau
- Vice-Chairmen: Richard Tsoi, Lo Kin-hei
- Secretary: Cheung Yin-tung
- Treasurer: Ng Wing-fai
- Executive Committee Members:

- Au Nok-hin
- Cheung Man-kwong
- Josephine Chan Shu-ying
- Joseph Chow Kam-siu
- Lee Wing-tat
- Ricky Or Yiu-lam
- Andrew Wan Siu-kin
- Helena Wong Pik-wan
- Wu Chi-wai

- Central Committee Members:

- Chai Man-hon
- Andrew Chiu Ka-yin
- Albert Ho Chun-yan
- Kwong Chun-yu
- Lai King-wai
- Lam Chung-hoi
- Eric Lam Lap-chi
- Mark Li Kin-yin
- Li Wing-shing
- Christopher Tsoi Yu-lung
- Sin Chung-kai
- Tsui Hon-kwong
- Wong King-fong
- Wong Sing-chi
- Yeung Sum
- Yuen Hoi-man

== Aftermath ==
Political analyst Ma Ngok expressed disappointment at the result and doubted the new leader could rejuvenate the party. "Lau is a veteran politician who first ran in a direct election for the Legislative Council 20 years ago. She belongs to the first generation, like Sin. She has appeared to be quite distant from civil society in recent years. How can she rejuvenate the party? She won by a narrow margin. Neither she nor Sin is a popular leader," Ma said.
