= Au Nok-hin =

Hong Kong politician

- 區諾軒
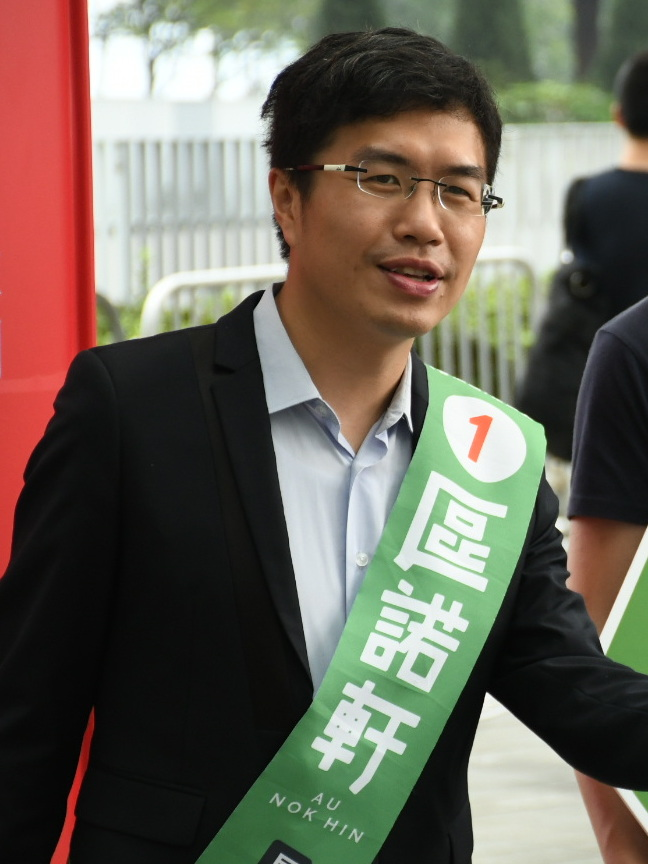
- Au in the 2018 Legislative Council by-election

Member of the Legislative Council
- In office 21 March 2018 – 17 December 2019
- Preceded by: Nathan Law
- Constituency: Hong Kong Island

Convenor of the Civil Human Rights Front
- In office October 2016 – October 2017
- Preceded by: Jimmy Sham
- Succeeded by: Sammy Ip

Member of the Southern District Council
- In office 1 January 2012 – 31 December 2019
- Preceded by: Wong Che-ngai
- Succeeded by: Chan Yan-yi
- Constituency: Lei Tung I

Personal details
- Born: 18 June 1987 (age 39) Hong Kong
- Party: Democratic (2009–2017)
- Other political affiliations: Left 21 (2010–2014)
- Education: Chinese University of Hong Kong
- Occupation: District councillor

Au Nok-hin
- Traditional Chinese: 區諾軒
- Simplified Chinese: 区诺轩
Transcriptions
Standard Mandarin
- Hanyu Pinyin: Ōu Nuòxuān
Yue: Cantonese
- Jyutping: au1 nok6 hin1

Au Nok-hin (Chinese: 區諾軒; born 18 June 1987) is a pro-democracy politician in Hong Kong. He is the former member of the Legislative Council for Hong Kong Island from 2018 to 2019 and member of the Southern District Council for Lei Tung I from 2012 to 2019.

From 2016 to 2017, Au was the convenor of the Civil Human Rights Front. In the 2018 Legislative Council by-election triggered by oath-taking controversy, Au replaced Demosistō candidate Agnes Chow who was disqualified over her alleged pro-independence stance. He was elected with more than 130,000 votes. Au was a member of the Democratic Party until 2017. In December 2019, Chow's disqualification was ruled unlawful by a court, invalidating the by-election result and unseating Au.

== Early life and education ==
Au was born in Hong Kong in 1987 and grew up in Kai Yip Estate in Kowloon Bay. He studied at the conservative Baptist Lui Ming Choi Primary School and St. Joseph's Anglo-Chinese School. He participated in the students union when he studied at the Chinese University of Hong Kong (CUHK) and joined the anti-Express Rail Link protests in 2009 and 2010. He then pursued a master's in political science at CUHK.

== District Council and party politics ==
Au joined the Democratic Party in 2009 and was first elected to the Southern District Council at the age of 24 in the 2011 District Council election, running in Lei Tung I, a constituency covered the Lei Tung Estate with another young Democrat Lo Kin-hei.

Au was always at the progressive end of the spectrum in the Democratic Party, urging it to take a more radical stance to uphold the interests and core values of the Hong Kong people. He also opposed the party's secret meeting with Beijing officials in 2015. He became the youngest candidate to run in the 2012 party leadership election against the two chairpersons and veteran legislators Emily Lau and Sin Chung-kai, after Albert Ho resigned as chairman in the wake of the party's disastrous 2012 Legislative Council election defeat. He received 14 votes, against Lau's 149 votes and Sin's 133 votes.

Au was on James To's ticket in territory-wide District Council (Second) "super seats" in the 2012 Legislative Council election, placing third after To and Andrew Chiu Ka-yin. Although Au was not elected on To's list, his ticket saw To being elected with 316,468 votes, the largest votes received by a ticket in Hong Kong's electoral history.

Au was a member of the central committee of the Democratic Party.

He had a frontline role in the 2014 Hong Kong protests, starting with the storming of "Civic Square", the public forecourt of the Central Government Complex on September 26, in the lead-up to the mass sit-ins. He also addressed the crowds in Mong Kok some nights.

In 2014, he challenged incumbent chairwoman Emily Lau again in the leadership re-election in a four-way contest with legislator Wu Chi-wai and party treasurer Stanley Ng. He received 33 member votes and was eliminated in the first round.

== Legislative Council bids ==
Au was tipped to run in the 2016 Legislative Council election in Hong Kong Island with another rising star Chai Man-hon. However, both Au and Chai did not submit their nominations in the intra-party pre-election primary. Au is planning to run in the Wholesale and Retail functional constituency, a long-time stronghold of the pro-Beijing camp and had been held by the Liberal Party. As a partner in his mother's fashion retail company, which has two shops and a booth in the Sincere Department Store, he is eligible to run in the trade-based constituency. He received 1,231 votes and was defeated by Liberal Party's Shiu Ka-fai.

From 2016 to 2017, he was the convenor of the Civil Human Rights Front. He also ran in the 2016 Election Committee subsector elections and received 561 votes, being defeated by Vincent Fang's ticket.

In 2017, he quit the Democratic Party "to pursue his own political beliefs". He was later tipped as a candidate for the 2018 Legislative Council Hong Kong Island by-election for the seat left vacant after the disqualification of Nathan Law of Demosistō. Demosistō member Agnes Chow who later became the candidate, was disqualified by the returning officer which led to Au becoming the common candidate of the pro-democracy camp. He was elected with more than 130,000 votes, about 51 per cent of the vote share, defeating Judy Chan of the New People's Party.

== Arrests ==
Au Nok-hin was arrested at his home in Kwun Tong on 30 August 2019 regarding his role in a demonstration on 8 July 2019, during the 2019–2020 Hong Kong protests. He was accused of obstructing and assaulting a police officer with the volume of his loudspeaker. On the same day, Hong Kong police arrested numerous pro-democracy figures and politicians. Ko Chun-pong, a Superintendent of the Hong Kong Police Public Relations Branch, alleged that he felt discomfort in his right ear because Au's speaker seemed too loud. Another police officer, Kwan Chi-ho, testified that Au hit his riot shield three times.

On 18 April 2020, Au was arrested again, as one of 15 Hong Kong high-profile pro-democracy figures, on suspicion of organizing, publicizing or taking part in several unauthorized assemblies between August and October 2019 in the course of the anti-extradition bill protests.

On 24 April, Au was sentenced to 140 hours of community service after a judge convicted him of assault for using a loudspeaker near the police. Au had maintained his innocence and stated his intentions to file an appeal. Since his conviction, the Hong Kong Bar Association launched an inquiry against Vivien Chan Man-wai, the prosecutor in Au's case, after she was accused of violating professional standards.

On 6 January 2021, Au was among 55 members of the pro-democratic camp who were arrested under the national security law, specifically its provision regarding alleged subversion. The group stood accused of organising and participating in unofficial primary elections held by the camp in July 2020. Au was released on bail on 7 January.

In February 2023, Au was the first defendant to testify against his peers, saying that the goal was to turn the Legislative Council into a "weapon of mass destruction."

== Personal life ==
Au hosts an internet radio programme about Japanese culture and teaches Japanese in the estate he serves. He is known to be a fan of Japanese anime.

== See also ==
- Lo Kin-hei

Political offices
Preceded by Cheung Siu-keung	Member of Southern District Council; Representative for Lei Tung I 2012–2019	Succeeded by Chan Yan-yi
Preceded by Jimmy Sham	Convenor of Civil Human Rights Front; 2016–2017	Succeeded by Sammy Ip
Legislative Council of Hong Kong
Preceded by Nathan Law	Member of Legislative Council; Representative for Hong Kong Island; 2018–2019	Succeeded by Vacant
