= Lei Tung =

Lei Tung may refer to:

- Lei Tung Estate, a public housing estate in Ap Lei Chau, Hong Kong
- Lei Tung station, an MTR rapid transit station adjacent to the estate
- Lei Tung I, Southern District Council constituency
- Lei Tung II, Southern District Council constituency
