= Shek Yam (constituency) =

Hong Kong constituency

- Elected constituency for the Kwai Tsing District Council
- Boundary of Shek Yam in Kwai Tsing District
- District: Kwai Tsing
- Legislative Council constituency: New Territories South West
- Population: 19,678 (2019)
- Electorate: 12,310 (2019)

Current constituency
- Created: 1994
- Number of members: One
- Member: Vacant

Shek Yam is one of the 31 constituencies of the Kwai Tsing District Council. The seat elects one member of the council every four years. It was first created in the 1994 elections. Its boundary is loosely based on the Shek Yam Estate and Ning Fung Court.

== Councillors represented ==
Election	Member	Party
1994	Ng Chung-tak	Democratic
1999	Li Chi-fai	Democratic
2003	Andrew Wan Siu-kin	NWSC
2007	Andrew Wan Siu-kin	NWSC→Democratic
2011	Andrew Wan Siu-kin	Democratic
2015	Li Sai-lung	DAB
2019	Andrew Wan Siu-kin→Vacant (Note: Resigned on 10 May 2021 after being arrested under national security law.)	Democratic

== Election results ==
=== 2010s ===
Kwai Tsing District Council Election, 2019: Shek Yam
Party	Candidate	Votes	%	±%
Democratic	Andrew Wan Siu-kin	4,891	56.73	+7.23
DAB	Li Sai-lung	3,731	43.27	−7.23
Majority		1,160	13.46	
Turnout		8,654	70.35	
Democratic gain from DAB		Swing		

Kwai Tsing District Council Election, 2015: Shek Yam
Party	Candidate	Votes	%	±%
DAB	Li Sai-lung	2,907	50.5	+13.5
Democratic	Andrew Wan Siu-kin	2,853	49.5	–13.5
Majority		54	1.0	–25.0
Turnout		5,829	49.9	
DAB gain from Democratic		Swing	+13.5	

Kwai Tsing District Council Election, 2011: Shek Yam
Party	Candidate	Votes	%	±%
Democratic	Andrew Wan Siu-kin	2,891	62.98	−5.08
DAB	Wong Ho-yan	1,700	37.02	+5.08
Majority		1,191	25.94	−10.18
Democratic hold		Swing		

=== 2000s ===
Kwai Tsing District Council Election, 2007: Shek Yam
Party	Candidate	Votes	%	±%
NWSC	Andrew Wan Siu-kin	3,062	68.06	+10.85
DAB	Lor Hin-wai	1,437	31.94	N/A
Majority		1,625	36.12	+21.70
NWSC hold		Swing		

Kwai Tsing District Council Election, 2003: Shek Yam
Party	Candidate	Votes	%	±%
NWSC	Andrew Wan Siu-kin	2,332	57.21	N/A
Independent	Lui Hok-nang	1,744	42.79	N/A
Majority		588	14.42	N/A
NWSC gain from Democratic		Swing	N/A	

=== 1990s ===
Kwai Tsing District Council Election, 1999: Shek Yam
Party	Candidate	Votes	%	±%
Democratic	Li Chi-fai	1,524	61.98	+10.54
Independent	Lo Yui-chuen	935	38.02	N/A
Majority		589	23.96	+20.52
Democratic hold		Swing		

Kwai Tsing District Board Election, 1994: Shek Yam
Party	Candidate	Votes	%	±%
Democratic	Ng Chung-tak	1,092	51.44	
Public Affairs Society	Tsui Wing-cheung	1,031	48.56	
Majority		61	3.44	(new)
Democratic win (new seat)				
