= Lai Chi Kok Central (constituency) =

Hong Kong constituency

- Elected constituency for the Sham Shui Po District Council
- Boundary of Lai Chi Kok Central in Sham Shui Po District
- District: Sham Shui Po
- Legislative Council constituency: Kowloon West
- Population: 18,975 (2019)
- Electorate: 8,704 (2019)

Current constituency
- Created: 2015
- Number of members: One
- Member: Ramon Yuen (Democratic)
- Created from: Lai Chi Kok North

Lai Chi Kok Central (Chinese: 荔枝角中) is one of the 25 constituencies in the Sham Shui Po District of Hong Kong which was created in 2015.

The constituency loosely covers Liberté, The Pacifica and Banyan Garden in Lai Chi Kok with the estimated population of 18,975.

== Councillors represented ==
Election	Member	Party
2015	Ramon Yuen Hoi-man	Democratic

== Election results ==
=== 2010s ===
Sham Shui Po District Council Election, 2015: Lai Chi Kok Central
Party	Candidate	Votes	%	±%
Democratic	Ramon Yuen Hoi-man	4,503	63.54	+12.14
BPA	Bruce Li Ki-fung	2,584	36.46	−12.14
Majority		1,919	27.08	
Turnout		7,128	81.90	
Democratic hold		Swing		

Sham Shui Po District Council Election, 2015: Lai Chi Kok Central
Party	Candidate	Votes	%	±%
Democratic	Ramon Yuen Hoi-man	2,353	51.4	
BPA (KWND)	Bruce Li Ki-fung	2,229	48.6	
Majority		124	2.8	
Turnout		4,628	65.3	
Democratic win (new seat)				
