= Rosanda Mok =

Hong Kong politician

- 莫嘉嫻
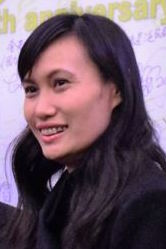

Chairperson of the Hong Kong Association for Democracy and People's Livelihood
- In office 23 January 2016 – 24 September 2016
- Preceded by: Bruce Liu
- Succeeded by: Sze Tak-loy

Member of the Wong Tai Sin District Council
- In office 1 January 2020 – 9 July 2021
- Preceded by: Wu Chi-wai
- Constituency: King Fu

Member of the Kowloon City District Council
- In office 1 January 2000 – 31 December 2015
- Preceded by: Luk Wai-kong
- Succeeded by: Terence Siu
- Constituency: Ma Tau Wai

Personal details
- Born: May 23, 1972 (age 54) Hong Kong
- Party: Hong Kong Association for Democracy and People's Livelihood (1999–2017); Democratic Party (2017–2025)
- Education: Chinese University of Hong Kong
- Occupation: Politician

Rosanda Mok Ka-han (Chinese: 莫嘉嫻; born 23 May 1972) is a Democratic Party politician in Hong Kong and a member of Wong Tai Sin District. She is the former chairman of the pro-democracy pro-grassroots Hong Kong Association for Democracy and People's Livelihood (ADPL) and former member of the Kowloon City District Council for Ma Tau Wai.

== Biography ==
Rosanda Mok was born in 1972 and graduated from the Chinese University of Hong Kong with a master's degree in Sociology. She joined the Hong Kong Association for Democracy and People's Livelihood (ADPL), a local-based pro-grassroots pro-democratic party and was first elected to the Kowloon City District Council through Ma Tau Wai in the 1999 District Council election and re-elected for three times until she was unseated by the pro-Beijing Democratic Alliance for the Betterment and Progress of Hong Kong (DAB) newcomer Terence Siu Tin-hung in the 2015 election with a narrow margin of 45 votes.

She has also held public positions including the Buildings Appeal Tribunal Panel, the Gas Safety Appeal Board Panel, and the Obscene and Indecent Articles Panel of Adjudicators.

On 23 January 2016, Mok was elected the first female chair of the ADPL, succeeding veteran Bruce Liu. Her chairmanship lasted for less than a year as in September the same year, Mok resigned from the chairperson post of ADPL because her party suffered a historic defeat in losing its only seat in the 2016 legislative election. She was succeeded by Sze Tak-loy.

In 2017, after a legislative seat in West Kowloon was vacated following the oath-taking controversy, veteran lawmaker and former chairman Frederick Fung sought for nominations from ADPL to contest the March 2018 Kowloon West by-election. However, Mok insisted the party should nominate a younger member instead. She left the ADPL on 26 June 2017 after the party resolved to nominate Fung. She later joined the Democratic Party. In 2019, she fought the Wong Tai Sin District Council seat vacated by party chairman Wu Chi-wai, and retained the seat.

Political offices
Preceded by Luk Wai-kong	Member of the Kowloon City District Council; Representative for Ma Tau Wai; 2000–2015	Succeeded by Terence Siu
Preceded by Wu Chi-wai	Member of the Wong Tai Sin District Council; Representative for King Fu; 2020–2021	Succeeded by (Vacant)
Party political offices
Preceded by Bruce Liu	Chairperson of the Association for Democracy and People's Livelihood; 2016	Succeeded by Sze Tak-loy
