= King Fu (constituency) =

Constituency of Hong Kong

- 瓊富
- Elected constituency for the Wong Tai Sin District Council
- Boundary of King Fu in Wong Tai Sin District
- District: Wong Tai Sin
- Legislative Council constituency: Kowloon Central
- Population: 18,840 (2019)
- Electorate: 13,013 (2019)

Current constituency
- Created: 1994
- Number of members: One
- Member: (Vacant)

King Fu
- Traditional Chinese: 瓊富
Transcriptions
Yue: Cantonese
- Yale Romanization: Kìhng fu
- Jyutping: King4 fu3

King Fu is one of the 25 constituencies of the Wong Tai Sin District Council in Hong Kong. The seat elects one member of the council every four years. The seat was held by Rosanda Mok from 2020 to 2021.

== Councillors represented ==
Election	Member	Party
1994	Chan Chau-faan	DAB
1999	Wu Chi-wai	Democratic
2019	Rosanda Mok Ka-han→vacant	Democratic

== Election results ==
=== 2010s ===
Wong Tai Sin District Council Election, 2019: King Fu
Party	Candidate	Votes	%	±%
Democratic	Rosanda Mok Ka-han	5,559	58.75	−3.45
FTU	Wong Chun-kin	3,903	41.25	+3.45
Majority		1,656	17.50	
Turnout		9,519	73.16	
Democratic hold		Swing		

Wong Tai Sin District Council Election, 2015: King Fu
Party	Candidate	Votes	%	±%
Democratic	Wu Chi-wai	3,907	62.2	–19.4
FTU	Wong Chun-kin	2,377	37.8	
Majority		1,530	24.4	–38.8
Turnout		6,338	51.3	
Democratic hold		Swing		

Wong Tai Sin District Council Election, 2011: King Fu
Party	Candidate	Votes	%	±%
Democratic	Wu Chi-wai	4,300	81.6	+5.1
Independent	Guo Shan-zhen	968	18.4	−5.1
Majority		3,332	63.2	+10.2
Democratic hold		Swing		

=== 2000s ===
Wong Tai Sin District Council Election, 2007: King Fu
Party	Candidate	Votes	%	±%
Democratic	Wu Chi-wai	4,370	76.5	+1.2
Independent	Susanna Wong Shui-wan	1,344	23.5	N/A
Majority		3,036	53.0	+2.3
Democratic hold		Swing		

Wong Tai Sin District Council Election, 2003: King Fu
Party	Candidate	Votes	%	±%
Democratic	Wu Chi-wai	4,480	75.3	+10.6
DAB	Lee Tak-hong	1,466	24.7	−10.6
Majority		3,014	50.7	+21.2
Democratic hold		Swing		

=== 1990s ===
Wong Tai Sin District Council Election, 1999: King Fu
Party	Candidate	Votes	%	±%
Democratic	Wu Chi-wai	2,605	64.7	+26.3
DAB	Chan Chau-faan	1,419	35.3	−26.3
Majority		1186	29.5	
Democratic gain from DAB		Swing		

Wong Tai Sin District Board Election, 1994: King Fu
Party	Candidate	Votes	%	±%
DAB	Chan Chau-faan	2,600	61.8	
Democratic	Chung Cho-hong	1,605	38.2	
Majority		995	33.6	(new)
