= Andrew Wan =

Hong Kong politician

Andrew Wan Siu-kin
- 尹兆堅
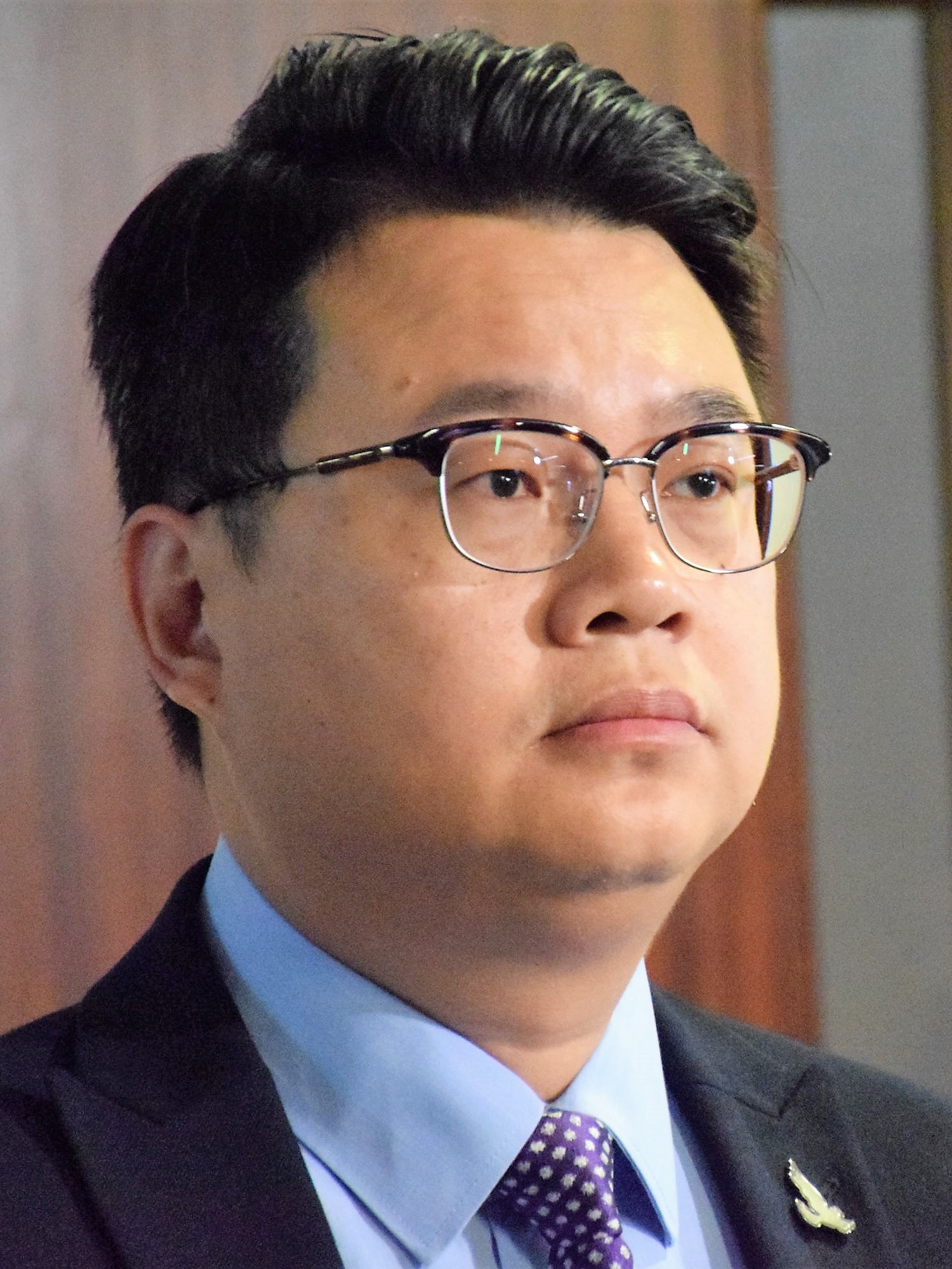

Member of the Legislative Council
- In office 1 October 2016 – 1 December 2020
- Preceded by: Leung Yiu-chung
- Constituency: New Territories West

Vice-Chairman of the Democratic Party
- In office 2 December 2018 – 6 December 2020
- Chairperson: Wu Chi-wai
- Preceded by: Li Wing-shing
- Succeeded by: Lam Cheuk-ting; Edith Leung
- In office 14 December 2014 – 4 December 2016
- Chairperson: Emily Lau
- Preceded by: Richard Tsoi
- Succeeded by: Li Wing-shing

Member of the Kwai Tsing District Council
- In office 1 January 2020 – 11 May 2021
- Preceded by: Li Sai-lung
- Constituency: Shek Yam
- In office 1 January 2004 – 31 December 2015
- Preceded by: Li Chi-fai
- Succeeded by: Li Sai-lung
- Constituency: Shek Yam

Personal details
- Born: 7 June 1969 (age 57) Hong Kong
- Party: Neighbourhood and Worker's Service Centre (2002–08); Democratic Party (2009–2025)
- Education: City University of Hong Kong (BSS); University of Essex (MA)
- Occupation: Social worker District councillor

Andrew Wan Siu-kin (Chinese: 尹兆堅; born 7 June 1969) is the former vice-chairman of the Democratic Party and a former member of the Kwai Tsing District Council for Shek Yam constituency. He was elected in the 2016 Hong Kong Legislative Council election through New Territories West.

== Career ==
Born in Hong Kong in 1969, Wan graduated from the City University of Hong Kong with a Bachelor of Social Science (BSocSc) in Social Work, studied at the University of Essex from 2006 and graduated with Bachelor and Master of Arts in Sociology.

In 2002, he joined the pro-democracy Neighbourhood and Worker's Service Centre (NWSC) as the assistant of legislator Leung Yiu-chung and ran in the 2003 District Council elections, defeating the pro-Beijing Democratic Alliance for Betterment of Hong Kong (DAB) in Shek Yam and was re-elected in 2007. He partnered with Leung Yiu-chung in the 2004 Legislative Council election in the second place and helped Leung to win a seat the LegCo although he was not elected himself.

Wan quit the NWSC in 2008 and joined the Democratic Party in 2009. In the 2014 party leadership election, he was elected as Vice-Chairman of the Democratic Party.

In the 2015 Hong Kong district council elections, he lost his seat in the Kwai Tsing District Council to newcoming Democratic Alliance for the Betterment and Progress of Hong Kong Li Sai-lung in Shek Yam in the Kwai Tsing District Council with a margin of 54 votes. He was elected in the 2016 Hong Kong Legislative Council election through New Territories West. In the 2019 Hong Kong local elections he was re-elected to the Shek Yam seat, from which he resigned on 11 May 2021, citing the national security case he had been charge with and nine other criminal cases.

== Arrests ==
Wan was arrested on 1 November 2020, along with six other democrats, in connection with the melee that had broken out in the LegCo on 8 May 2020. On that day, Starry Lee, the incumbent chair of the House Committee of the Legislative Council, had attempted to commence a meeting of the committee after extended stalling tactics of the pan-democratic camp over the previous months.

On 6 January 2021, Wan was among 53 members of the pro-democratic camp who were arrested under the national security law, specifically its provision regarding alleged subversion. The group stood accused of the organisation of and participation in unofficial primary elections held by the camp in July 2020. Wan was released on bail on 7 January.

Wan was charged with subversion on 28 February 2021 along with 46 others politicians and activists. On 25 March 2021, the High Court denied him bail and ordered back to prison until the next hearing on the case.

On 28 May 2021, High Court judge Esther Toh upheld her decision that Wan had his bail denied, citing content on his computer that advocated for Hong Kong independence, and the formation of a group which called for international sanctions against Hong Kong officials who allegedly permitted "excessive police violence". This, the court argued, demonstrated a "persistent and strong devotion" to the agenda of subversion and secession.

Political offices
Preceded by Li Chi-fai	Member of Kwai Tsing District Council; Representative for Shek Yam; 2004–2015	Succeeded by Li Sai-lung
Preceded by Li Sai-lung	Member of Kwai Tsing District Council; Representative for Shek Yam; 2020–2021	Vacant
Party political offices
Preceded by Richard Tsoi	Vice Chairperson of Democratic Party; 2014–2016; Served alongside: Lo Kin-hei	Succeeded by Li Wing-shing
Preceded by Li Wing-shing	Vice Chairperson of Democratic Party; 2018–present Served alongside: Lo Kin-hei	Succeeded by Lam Cheuk-ting; Edith Leung
Legislative Council of Hong Kong
Preceded by Leung Yiu-chung	Member of Legislative Council; Representative for New Territories West; 2016–2020	Vacant
