= Lei Tung II =

Constituency of the Southern District Council of Hong Kong

- Elected constituency for the Southern District Council
- Boundary of Lei Tung II in Southern District
- District: Southern
- Legislative Council constituency: Hong Kong Island West
- Population: 14,666 (2019)
- Electorate: 11,241 (2019)

Current constituency
- Created: 1994
- Number of members: One
- Member: Vacant

Lei Tung II is one of the 17 constituencies in the Southern District, Hong Kong.

The constituency returns one district councillor to the Southern District Council, with an election every four years. The seat was last held by Lo Kin-hei of the Democratic Party.

Lei Tung II constituency is loosely based on the western part of the Lei Tung Estate in Ap Lei Chau with estimated population of 12,548.

== Councillors represented ==
Election	Member	Party
1994	Wong Che-ngai	Independent
2011	Lo Kin-hei→Vacant (Note: Resigned on 10 July 2021.)	Democratic

== Election results ==
=== 2010s ===
Southern District Council Election, 2019: Lei Tung II
Party	Candidate	Votes	%	±%
Democratic	Lo Kin-hei	4,737	62.84	+6.54
DAB	Jay Tan Jinjie	2,801	37.16	−3.54
Majority		1,936	25.58	
Turnout		7,563	67.30	
Democratic hold		Swing		

Southern District Council Election, 2015: Lei Tung II
Party	Candidate	Votes	%	±%
Democratic	Lo Kin-hei	2,564	56.3	+3.4
DAB	Pang Siu-kei	1,854	40.7	
Civic Passion	Timothy Tsoi Man-lung	119	2.6	
Nonpartisan	Tang Ka-lok	21	0.5	
Majority		710	15.6	
Turnout		4,581	50.8	
Democratic hold		Swing		

Southern District Council Election, 2011: Lei Tung II
Party	Candidate	Votes	%	±%
Democratic	Lo Kin-hei	2,346	52.9	+3.4
Independent	Wong Che-ngai	1,995	45.0	−5.5
People Power	Lo Chung-man	92	2.1	N/A
Majority		351	7.9	
Democratic gain from Independent		Swing		

=== 2000s ===
Southern District Council Election, 2007: Lei Tung II
Party	Candidate	Votes	%	±%
Independent	Wong Che-ngai	1,505	50.5	
Democratic	Lo Kin-hei	1,478	49.5	
Majority		27	1.0	
Independent hold		Swing		

Southern District Council Election, 2003: Lei Tung II
Party	Candidate	Votes	%	±%
Independent	Wong Che-ngai	Unopposed	N/A	N/A
Independent hold		Swing		

=== 1990s ===
Southern District Council Election, 1999: Lei Tung II
Party	Candidate	Votes	%	±%
Independent	Wong Che-ngai	Unopposed	N/A	N/A
Independent hold		Swing		

Southern District Board Election, 1994: Lei Tung II
Party	Candidate	Votes	%	±%
Independent	Wong Che-ngai	1,152	48.7	
DAB	Tsang Sik-ming	678	28.6	
Liberal	Idy Chan Yuk-lin	537	22.7	
Majority		474	20.1	(new)
