= Lei Tung I =

- Elected constituency for the Southern District Council
- Boundary of Lei Tung I in Southern District
- District: Southern
- Legislative Council constituency: Hong Kong Island West
- Population: 13,493 (2019)
- Electorate: 8,556 (2019)

Current constituency
- Created: 1994
- Number of members: One
- Member: Vacant

Lei Tung I is one of the 17 constituencies in the Southern District, Hong Kong.

The constituency returns one district councillor to the Southern District Council, with an election every four years. The councillor was last held by Janice Chan Yan-yi from Democratic Party.

Lei Tung I constituency is loosely based on part of the Lei Tung Estate and Yue On Court in Ap Lei Chau with estimated population of 15,054.

== Councillors represented ==
Election	Member	Party
1994	Benny Chu Chun-yin	Independent
2007	Cheung Siu-keung	Independent
2011	Au Nok-hin	Democratic
2017	Au Nok-hin	Independent
2019	Janice Chan Yan-yi→Vacant (Note: Resigned on 9 July 2021.)	Democratic

== Election results ==
=== 2010s ===
Southern District Council Election, 2019: Lei Tung I
Party	Candidate	Votes	%	±%
Democratic	Janice Chan Yan-yi	3,827	62.89	
DAB	Albert Ng Ka-san	2,258	37.11	+1.31
Majority		1,569	25.78	
Turnout		6,122	71.55	
Democratic gain from Independent		Swing		

Southern District Council Election, 2015: Lei Tung I
Party	Candidate	Votes	%	±%
Democratic (Ap Lei Chau Community Trade Union)	Au Nok-hin	3,068	60.7	+10.8
DAB	Li Ka-ying	1,810	35.8	
Civic Passion	Wong Yun-kei	177	3.5	
Majority		1,258	24.9	+22.1
Turnout		5,066	49.4	
Democratic hold		Swing		

Southern District Council Election, 2011: Lei Tung I
Party	Candidate	Votes	%	±%
Democratic	Au Nok-hin	2,148	49.9	N/A
Independent	Cheung Siu-keung	2,029	47.1	−10.8
People Power	Chan Fung-wah	129	3.0	N/A
Majority		119	2.8	
Democratic gain from Independent		Swing		

=== 2000s ===
Southern District Council Election, 2007: Lei Tung I
Party	Candidate	Votes	%	±%
Independent	Cheung Siu-keung	1,535	57.9	
Independent	Benny Chu Chun-yin	1,117	42.1	
Majority		418	15.8	
Independent gain from Independent		Swing		

Southern District Council Election, 2003: Lei Tung I
Party	Candidate	Votes	%	±%
Independent	Benny Chu Chun-yin	Unopposed	N/A	N/A
Independent hold		Swing		

=== 1990s ===
Southern District Council Election, 1999: Lei Tung I
Party	Candidate	Votes	%	±%
Independent	Benny Chu Chun-yin	Unopposed	N/A	N/A
Independent hold		Swing		

Southern District Board Election, 1994: Lei Tung I
Party	Candidate	Votes	%	±%
Independent	Benny Chu Chun-yin	1,325	52.0	N/A
Democratic	Gordon Tse Chi-hing	684	26.8	N/A
Independent	Chan Sau-wan	351	13.8	N/A
Liberal	Chung Chi-hung	160	6.3	N/A
Independent win (new seat)				
