= Wilson Li =

Hong Kong politician

Wilson Li Wing-shing (Chinese: 李永成; born 1975) is a Hong Kong politician. He is formerly the secretary and currently the vice-chairman of the Democratic Party. He is also member of the Sha Tin District Council for Wu Kai Sha.

Li was born in 1975. He started working at Legislative Councillor Emily Lau's office in 2005. He joined the Democratic Party when The Frontier was merged into the Democratic Party in 2008. He became a member of the party central committee and served as party secretary-general of the party from 2014. In the 2016 Democratic Party leadership election, Li was elected vice-chairman with Southern District Councillor Lo Kin-hei with 209 and 222 votes.

Li first contested in City One in the 2007 District Council election but was defeated by incumbent Wong Ka-wing. He ran again in Wah Do in the North District Council in the 2011 District Council election but lost to Yiu Ming of the Democratic Alliance for the Betterment and Progress of Hong Kong (DAB). He won a seat in the a newly created constituency Wu Kai Sha in the 2015 District Council election.

Party political offices
Preceded by Cheung Yin-tung	Secretary of Democratic Party; 2014–2016	Succeeded by Cheung Yin-tung
Preceded by Andrew Wan	Vice Chairperson of Democratic Party; 2016–2018; Served alongside: Lo Kin-hei	Succeeded by Andrew Wan
Political offices
New constituency	Member of Sha Tin District Council; Representative for Wu Kai Sha; 2016–present	Incumbent
