= Lam Cheuk-ting =

Hong Kong politician (born 1977)

- 林卓廷
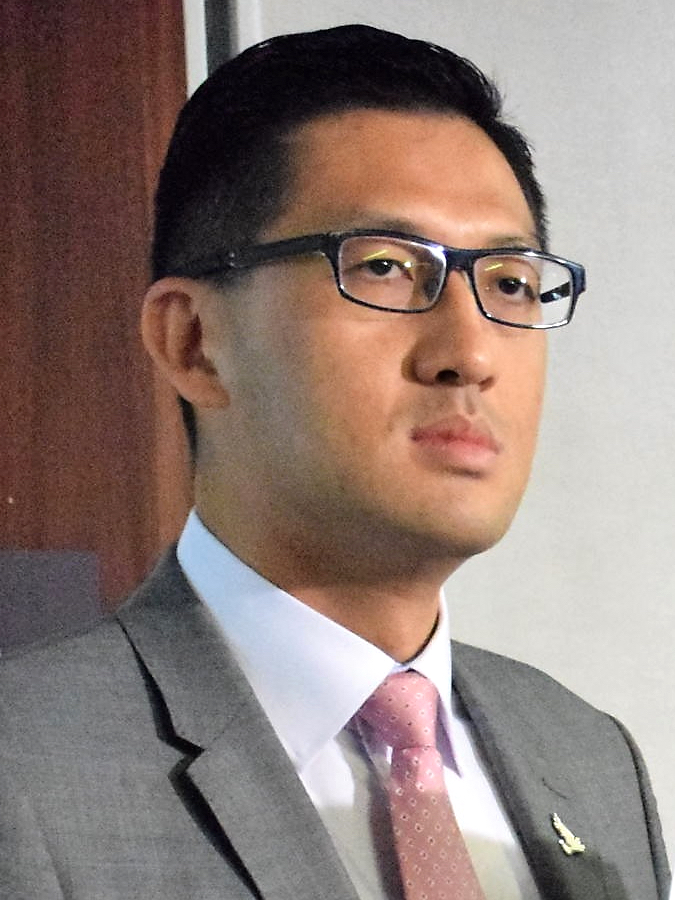
- Lam in 2017

Member of the Legislative Council
- In office 1 October 2016 – 1 December 2020
- Preceded by: Emily Lau
- Succeeded by: Constituency abolished
- Constituency: New Territories East

Personal details
- Born: Lam Cheuk-ting; 13 June 1977 (age 49) Hong Kong
- Party: Democratic Party
- Education: Chinese University of Hong Kong (BSS)
- Occupation: Politician

Lam Cheuk-ting
- Chinese: 林卓廷
Transcriptions
Standard Mandarin
- Hanyu Pinyin: Lín Zhuótíng
Yue: Cantonese
- Jyutping: lam4 coek3 ting4

Lam Cheuk-ting (Chinese: 林卓廷; Jyutping: lam4 coek3 ting4; born 13 June 1977) is a Democratic Party politician in Hong Kong. He is a former investigator of the Independent Commission Against Corruption (ICAC) and chief executive of the Democratic Party. He was a member of the North District Council for Shek Wu Hui until March 2021. He was elected to the Legislative Council of Hong Kong in 2016 through New Territories East.

== Biography ==
Lam graduated from the Chinese University of Hong Kong in 1999, studying Government and Public Administration. After graduation, he joined the Democratic Party and became assistant of Albert Ho. He was transferred to Democratic Party's Legislative Council Secretariat in 2001 and became assistant of party's chairman in 2003, having been serving Yeung Sum, Lee Wing-tat and Albert Ho. In 2006 when the Democratic Party set up a five-member investigation commission on the allegation of some senior members involving in spying activities of Beijing, he became the secretary of the commission.

He left the party and joined the Independent Commission Against Corruption (ICAC) as an investigator in 2006. He returned to the Democratic Party as chief executive in 2011, succeeding Chan Ka-wai who quit after being caught visiting a one-woman brothel.

Lam is a spokesman of the Property Owners' Anti Bid-Rigging Alliance against an alleged bid-rigging scandal in Garden Vista, where he is a resident, as well as the alleged scandals in other flats.

In 2015, he won a seat in Shek Wu Hui of the North District Council in the 2015 District Council elections, defeating incumbent Simon Wong Yuen-keung. In 2016, he represented the Democratic Party to run successfully in New Territories East for the 2016 Legislative Council election, succeeding chairwoman Emily Lau.

He was re-elected in the 2019 District Council elections for the same constituency, but resigned on 31 March 2021 when he was remanded in custody.

On 6 January 2021, Lam was among 53 members of the pro-democratic camp who were arrested under the national security law, specifically its provision regarding alleged subversion. The group stood accused of the organisation of and participation in unofficial primary elections held by the camp in July 2020. Lam was released on bail on 7 January.

=== Legal cases ===
==== 2019 Yuen Long attack ====
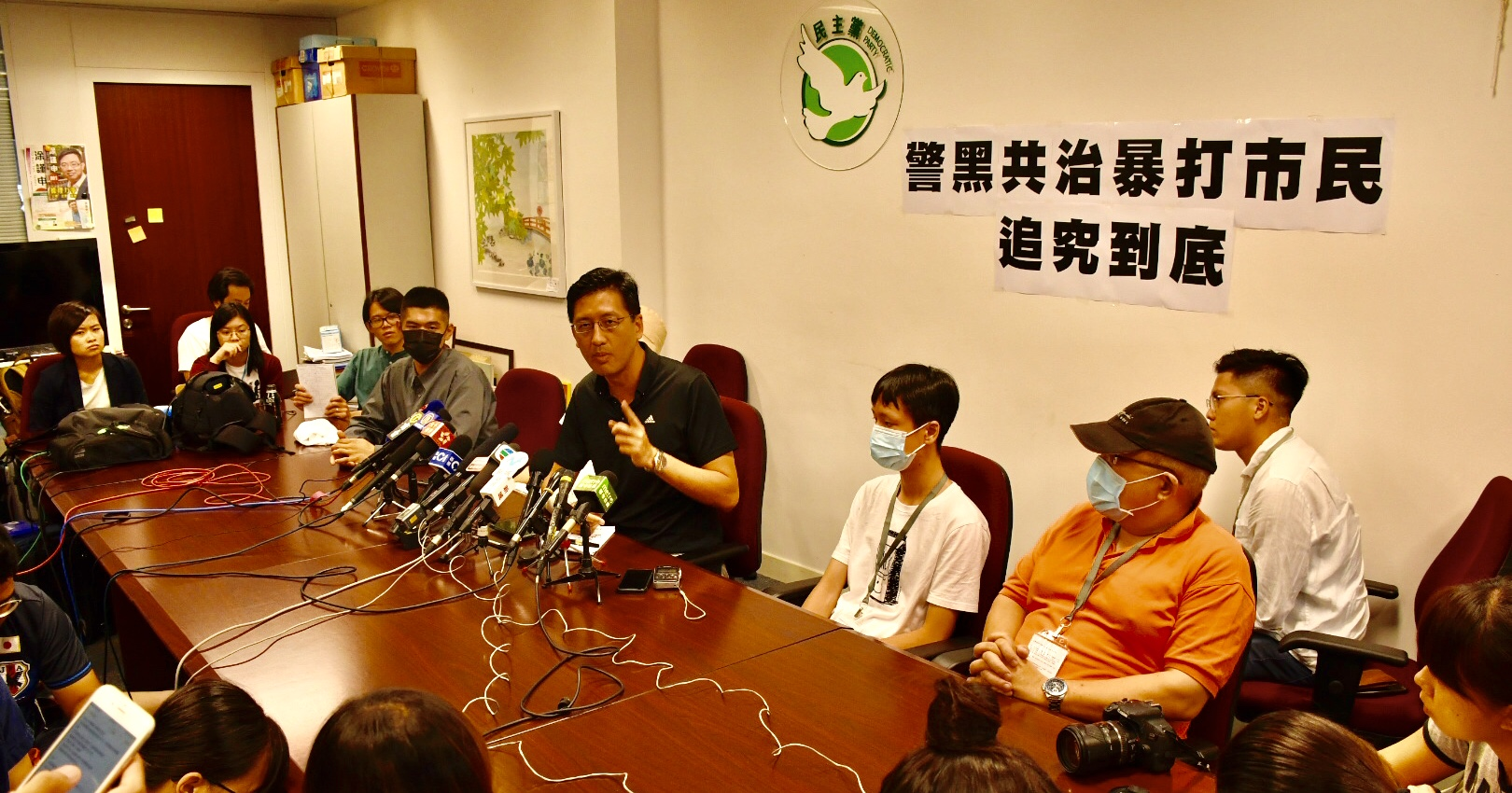
Lam Cheuk-ting held a press conference with several victims and witnesses of the Yuen Long attack to talk about the experience.

Lam was a victim of the Yuen Long attacks on 21 July 2019, when MTR passengers, journalists, and pro-democratic protesters were attacked by a mob of white-clad men. As a result, his mouth was wounded and he was treated with several stitches. Lam was streaming the violence on Facebook with his phone.

A rally was held in Yuen Long alleging that Lam was responsible for the Yuen Long attack and accusing him of bringing protesters to Yuen Long. In response, Lam pointed out that video footage shows the men attacking people in Yuen Long long before he arrived in the town, and replied that "telling a lie a hundred times will not make it the truth".

On 26 August 2020, Lam was arrested on charges of "rioting" for showing up in Yuen Long station on 21 July 2019, and "conspiring with others to damage property and obstructing the course of justice" in Tuen Mun on 6 July 2019. He was granted bail the same month, which was extended in December under condition of a ban on leaving Hong Kong. Prosecutors had cited the case of Ted Hui, without mentioning his name, as a reason for an increased risk that Lam would abscond.

On 28 December, Lam was arrested for allegedly disclosing personal details of individuals under police investigation for their possible role in the Yuen Long attacks. In January 2022 he was sentenced to four months in prison upon having been found guilty of disclosing the identity of a police superintendent under investigation.

==== Hong Kong 47 ====
Lam was again arrested on 6 January 2021 as part of the 2021 arrests of Hong Kong pro-democracy primaries participants. In May 2021, a representative of Lam said that Lam and eight other people who had been injured in the Yuan Long attack had decided to drop the civil lawsuit against Police Commissioner Chris Tang that they had filed in January 2020 in relation to the attack, citing the legal fees; his lawyer Albert Ho said that Lam felt "very tired having to attend all these [multiple charges]". On 30 May 2024, Lam was found guilty of subversion, along with 13 other defendants. He was sentenced to 6 years and nine months in prison.

Party political offices
Preceded by Chan Ka-wai	Chief Executive of Democratic Party; 2011–2016	Succeeded by Christopher Tsoi
Preceded by Lo Kin-hei; Andrew Wan	Vice Chairperson of Democratic Party; 2020–2021; Served alongside: Edith Leung	Succeeded by Lee Wing-tat
Political offices
Preceded by Simon Wong	Member of North District Council; Representative for Shek Wu Hui; 2016–2021	Vacant
Legislative Council of Hong Kong
Preceded by Emily Lau	Member of Legislative Council; Representative for New Territories East; 2016–2020	Constituency abolished
