= Richard Tsoi =

Hong Kong politician

Richard Tsoi Yiu-cheong
- 蔡耀昌
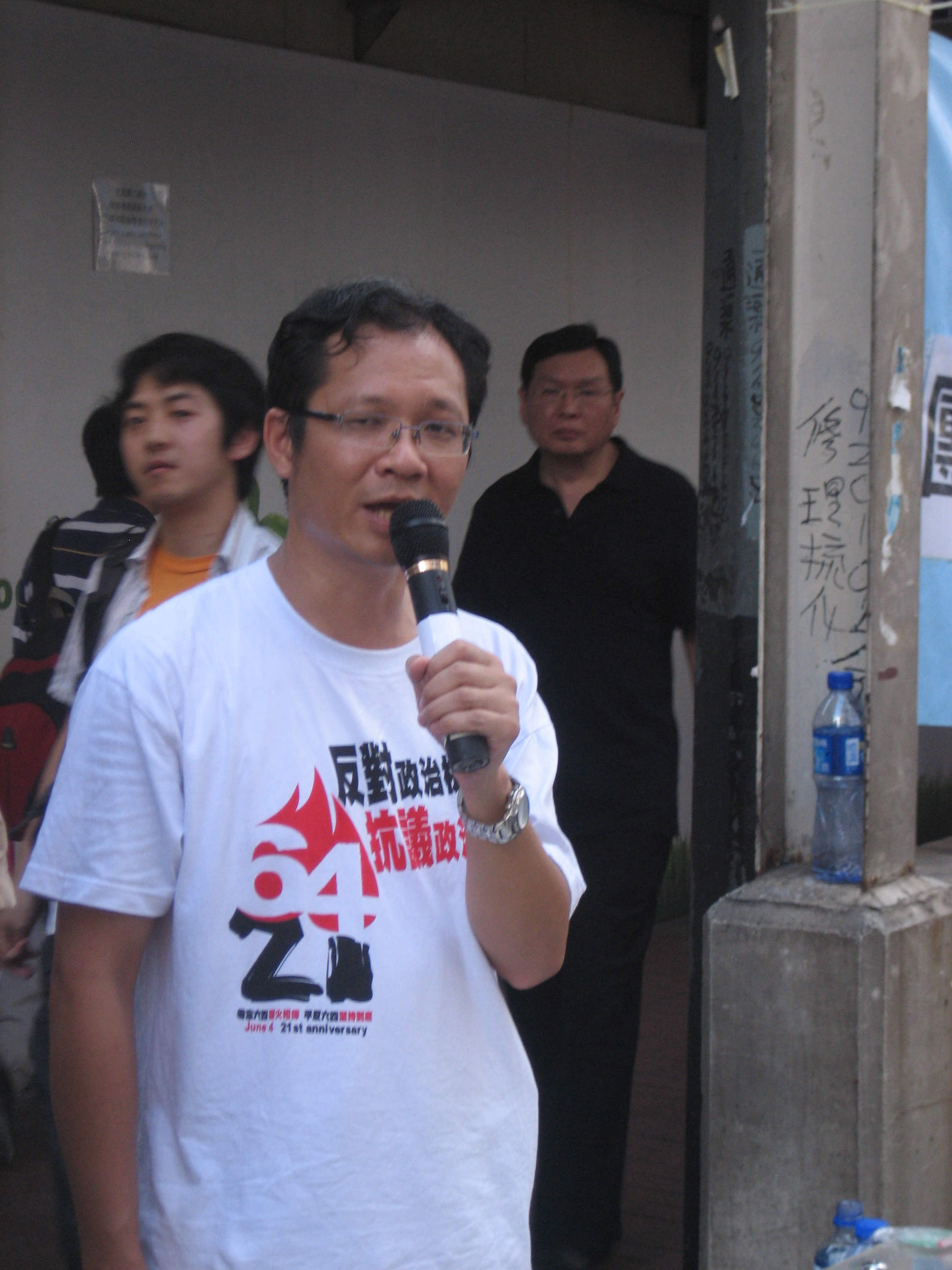
- Richard Tsoi in 2010 Hong Kong July 1 marches

Member of the Sha Tin District Council
- In office 2004–2007
- Preceded by: Porinda Liu
- Succeeded by: Scarlett Pong
- Constituency: Fo Tan

Secretary-General of the Hong Kong Federation of Students
- In office 1990–1991
- Preceded by: Andrew To
- Succeeded by: Adeline Wong

Personal details
- Born: September 11, 1967 (age 59) British Hong Kong
- Party: Democratic Party (2008–2025); Frontier (?—2008)
- Spouse: Chine Chan
- Education: Chinese University of Hong Kong, University of Hong Kong, Tsinghua University and People's University of China.
- Occupation: Politician

Richard Tsoi
- Chinese: 蔡耀昌
Transcriptions
Standard Mandarin
- Hanyu Pinyin: Cài Yàochāng
Yue: Cantonese
- Yale Romanization: Choi Yiuh chēung
- Jyutping: Coi^{3} Jiu^{6} coeng^{1}

Richard Tsoi Yiu-cheong (Chinese: 蔡耀昌; born 11 September 1967) is a Hong Kong politician and the former vice-chairman of the Democratic Party. He ran for many Legislative Council and District Council elections and was elected as Sha Tin District Councillor in 2003. On March 5, 2020, during the COVID-19 pandemic, Tsoi resigned from duties after joint petition from colleagues against his criticism of local restaurants being discriminatory towards Mainland Chinese.

Tsoi has been active in many pressure groups and protests of the pro-democracy camp.

On 18 April 2020, Tsoi was arrested as one of 15 Hong Kong high-profile democracy figures, on suspicion of organizing, publicizing or taking part in several unauthorized assemblies between August and October 2019 in the course of the anti-extradition bill protests. Following protocol, the police statement did not disclose the names of the accused.

== Positions held ==
- Vice Chairman, Democratic Party
- Deputy Convenor, Alliance for Universal Suffrage
- Executive Committee Member, Power for Democracy
- Member, Hong Kong Human Rights Commission
- Executive Committee Member, Amnesty International Hong Kong
- Spokesman, Coalition to Monitor Public Transport and Utilities
- Deputy Convenor, Health Care Policy Forum
- Convenor, The Shatin Union for People's Livelihood
- Chair, Sha Tin Youth Right Association

Party political offices
Preceded by Emily Lau	Vice Chairperson of Democratic Party; 2012–2014; Served alongside: Lo Kin-hei	Succeeded by Andrew Wan
