= Emily Lau =

Hong Kong journalist and politician

Emily Lau JP
- 劉慧卿
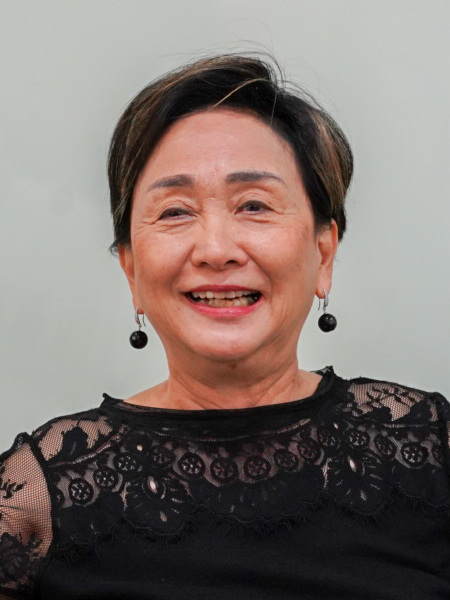
- Emily Lau in 2023

Chairperson of the Democratic Party
- In office 16 December 2012 – 4 December 2016
- Preceded by: Albert Ho
- Succeeded by: Wu Chi-wai

Member of the Legislative Council
- In office 1 July 1998 – 30 September 2016
- Preceded by: New parliament
- Succeeded by: Lam Cheuk-ting
- Constituency: New Territories East
- In office 9 October 1991 – 30 June 1997
- Preceded by: New constituency
- Succeeded by: Replaced by Provisional Legislative Council
- Constituency: New Territories East

Personal details
- Born: 21 January 1952 (age 74) Hong Kong
- Party: Democratic Party (2008–2025)
- Other political affiliations: Frontier (1996–2008)
- Spouses: John Ball (m. 1983; div. 1985) Winston Poon (m. 1989; div. 2006)
- Education: University of Southern California; London School of Economics
- Occupation: Journalist (former), politician
- Website: emilylau.org.hk

Emily Lau
- Traditional Chinese: 劉慧卿
- Simplified Chinese: 刘慧卿
Transcriptions
Standard Mandarin
- Hanyu Pinyin: Liú Huìqīng
Yue: Cantonese
- Yale Romanization: Làuh Wai hīng
- Jyutping: Lau^{4} Wai^{3} hing^{1}

Emily Lau Wai-hing JP (Chinese: 劉慧卿; born 21 January 1952) is a Hong Kong politician. A former journalist, she became the first woman directly elected to the Legislative Council of Hong Kong in the 1991 LegCo elections. She has served as Legislative Councillor for the New Territories East Constituency throughout the 1990s and 2000s until she stepped down in 2016. She was chairperson of the Democratic Party of Hong Kong until 2016.

== Early life ==
Lau was born on 21 January 1952 in Hong Kong. In 1948, Lau's parents moved from Guangdong to Hong Kong during the Chinese Civil War. In 1962, she attended the new English-language Maryknoll Sisters' School in Happy Valley where she studied until 1972. When she was in primary school, she was given the English name Emily by her aunt.

== Education ==
In 1976, Lau earned a Bachelor of Arts degree in broadcast journalism from the University of Southern California in Los Angeles, California. She later cited the Watergate scandal and investigative journalism having had a major formative effect on her views on the role and potential of the free press.

== Journalism career ==
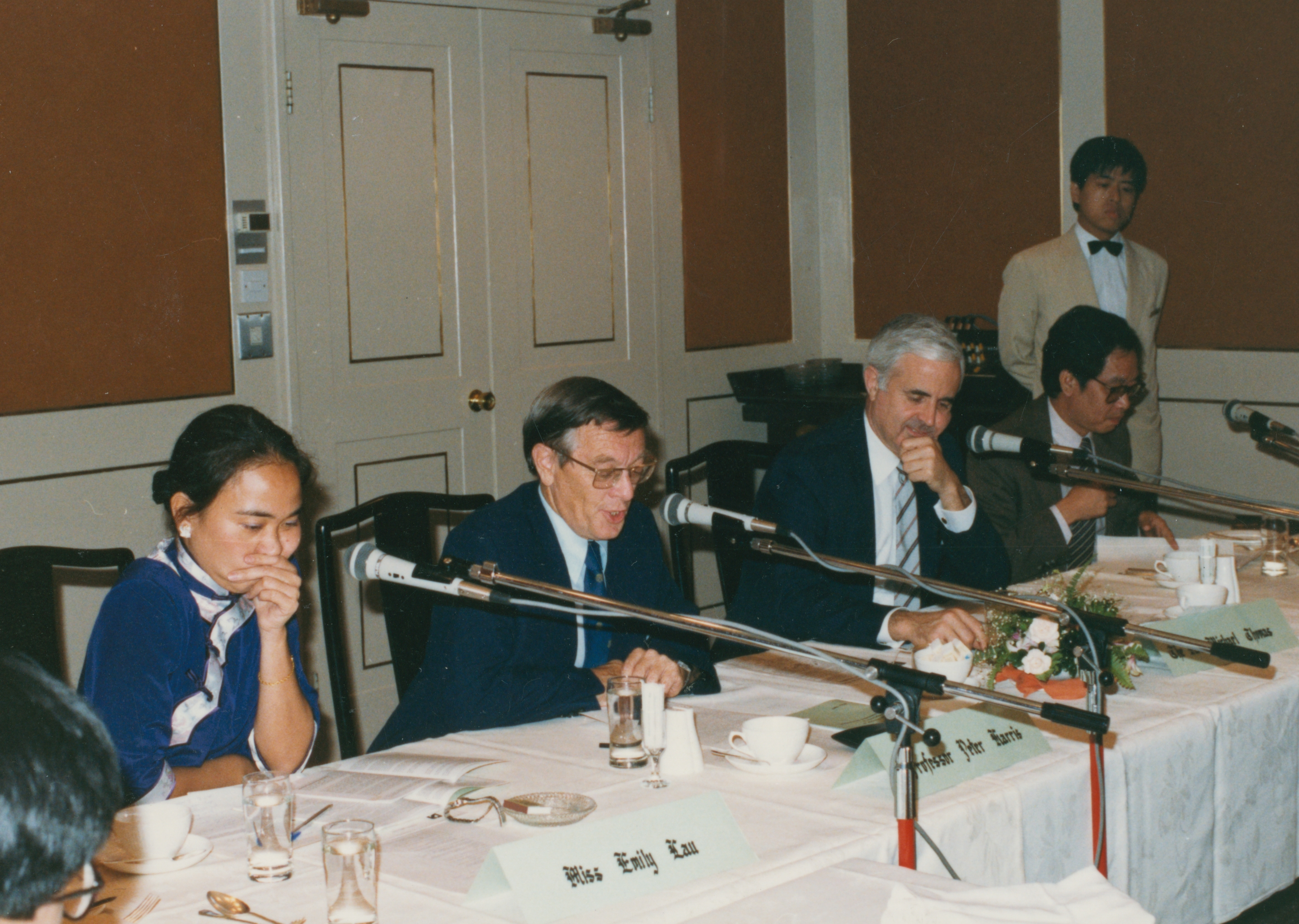
Emily Lau at the forum on the 1987 Green Paper: Review of Developments in Representative Government.

After returning to Hong Kong, Lau worked between 1976 and 1978 as a reporter for the South China Morning Post, the major English-language newspaper in Hong Kong. She then started doing television journalism when she joined the Television Broadcasts (TVB) and was promoted to senior producer in 1981. She continued her studies in the early 1980s at the London School of Economics and completed an MSc in International Relations in 1982. She held a position as assistant producer at the BBC between 1982 and 1984, while concurrently working as the London correspondent of Hong Kong TVB News.

It was at this time that the People's Republic of China and the United Kingdom discussed the fate of Hong Kong after 1997. She later noted, "My passion for politics began to develop in 1982, when China told Britain that it would impose a settlement on Hong Kong if the two sides could not reach an agreement by 1984. From that moment, politics began to matter."

Lau returned to Hong Kong as Hong Kong correspondent of the Hong Kong-based Far Eastern Economic Review in 1984. The position allowed her access and insights into the politics of the colonial Hong Kong. In 1987 Lau took up a position at the Journalism and Communication Department of the Chinese University of Hong Kong (CUHK) and subsequently at the Extra-Mural Department of the University of Hong Kong (HKU).

In December 1984, after signing the Sino-British Joint Declaration, British Prime Minister Margaret Thatcher flew to Hong Kong to give a press conference. Lau questioned Thatcher, "Prime Minister, two days ago you signed an agreement with China promising to deliver over 5 million people into the hands of a communist dictatorship. Is that morally defensible, or is it really true that in international politics the highest form of morality is one's own national interest?" Thatcher replied by saying that everyone in Hong Kong was happy with the agreement, and Lau may be a solitary exception.

Lau was also involved with the Hong Kong Journalists Association during this period, serving first as an executive committee member, then vice-chair and finally chairperson from 1989 to 1991.

== Legislative Councillor ==
=== Last years of the colonial period ===
When the direct elections for the Legislative Council of Hong Kong (LegCo) were first introduced in the 1991 elections, Lau resigned from her posts and ran for office in the New Territories East geographical constituency (GC). She campaigned for five months portraying herself as a new breed of politician in Hong Kong, appealing to a broad section of the Hong Kong population. The elections saw a liberal landslide victory and she became the first woman elected in direct elections, together with her fellow pro-democracy politicians of the United Democrats of Hong Kong (UDHK). Their success was in part due to the fear of Communist China by the Hong Kong population after the Tiananmen massacre of early June 1989.

In this period, Lau became a household name in Hong Kong politics and the legislator came to be known as both a champion of her constituents and a thorn in the side of the Hong Kong administration. She was equally a critic of Britain and Beijing. The last British Governor Chris Patten aimed at a faster pace of democratisation. Governor Patten carried out the reform packages which extended voting rights to millions of people in the revised functional constituency indirect elections. The reform packages were ferociously criticised by the Beijing government for violating the Sino-British agreements. During the reform packages discussions, Lau proposed a private member's bill which would have allowed all 60 Legislative Council seats to be directly elected in the 1995 election. The bill was beaten by only one vote.

In 1993, Lau tabled a motion to seek assurances of right of abode in Britain for the British National (Overseas) passport holders in case they were expelled from Hong Kong after 1997. The motion was supported by 36 legislators but was rejected by the Secretary for Security Alistair Asprey. In October 1994, Lau led legislators in urging Britain to grant full citizenship to 3.5 million native Hong Kong British Dependent Territories Citizens (BDTC). As part of this action, she led a cross-party delegation of Hong Kong legislators to Britain to lobby government and opposition politicians ahead of the LegCo debate. The five councillors met the British Foreign Secretary and other senior officials, but achieved little.

In the 1995 Legislative Council elections Lau was re-elected in her constituency with 58.51 per cent of votes cast, the highest figure among all of the geographical constituencies. Growing disillusioned with the Democratic Party, the pro-democracy party formed in 1994 to replace the United Democrats of Hong Kong, in August 1996 Lau founded a new political group, The Frontier, which took a more aggressively pro-democracy, pro-human rights and anti-Communist Party stance, with left wing positions on economic matters. Lau became the Convenor of the new party, which managed to obtain five legislators and become the fourth largest political group in the legislature before the handover. Lau remained in the Legislative Council until it was disbanded by the PRC following the handover on 1 July 1997.

Lau also participated in street protests and in December 1996 she scuffled with the riot police outside the Hong Kong Convention and Exhibition Centre together with Andrew Cheng and Lee Cheuk-yan, while demonstrating outside the closed-door election for the post-handover Chief executive. She was therefore arrested with 29 other pro-democracy activists. Over the months leading up to the July 1997 handover, Lau urged the Chief executive-designate Tung Chee-hwa to stand up against Beijing, since his "unreserved support" for the Beijing-hand-picked Provisional Legislative Council resulted in the abolishment or modification of important Hong Kong laws covering human rights and civil liberties. In March of the same year Lau called for the boycott of Hong Kong's future first election under PRC rule, condemning the voting system as unfair and the proportional representation as highly favouring pro-Beijing candidates.

=== Early post-handover era ===
After the handover in 1998 she was required to relinquish her British passport and adopt Chinese citizenship to be eligible in running for the 1998 Hong Kong legislative election. The pro-democracy camp ended up winning 63 per cent of the popular vote and Lau was returned again to the Legislative Council where she remained until her retirement.

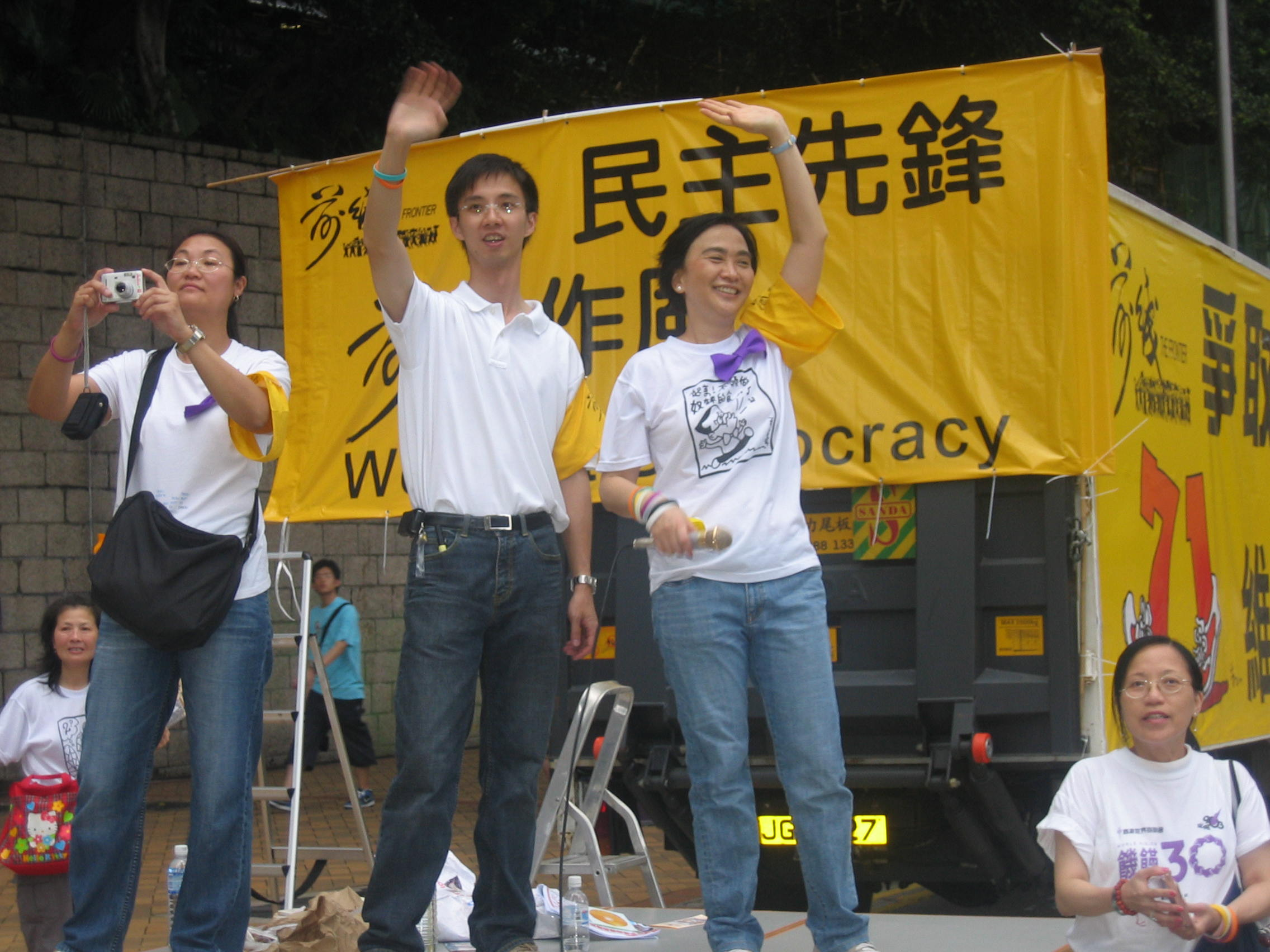
Emily Lau at the 1 July protest in 2005.

Lau led The Frontier to put pressure on the government for an early democratisation of Hong Kong and was an outspoken critic of a number of LedCo motions, especially on the topic of human rights; she was also sceptical of the reliability of the "One country, two systems" principle. Beside pushing for tightened human rights protection, greater efforts on equal opportunities and the establishment of a statutory right to access to information, she advocated for a complete rewrite of the Basic Law (Hong Kong's constitutional document) and for democracy in mainland China. In terms of economics policy, she supported legislation on fair trading, opposed the import of foreign labour and called for the introduction of a minimum wage. Lau received the Bruno Kreisky Award for her human rights work in 1998.

In 1998, Lau sued the Hong Kong branch of the Xinhua News Agency over its slow response to her queries for personal information. She lost the case and was ordered by the court to pay legal fees of HK$1.6 million. Claiming that her lawsuit was in the public interest, she attempted to raise funds from the general public to pay for this injunction. By December 2000 she was still $1 million short and the agency (now the Central People's Government Liaison Office) applied to the court for her bankruptcy.

In the 2002 Chief executive election, Lau was against supporting an alternative candidate as some pro-democracy allies argued: "As it is not a fair, open and democratic election, we should not participate in it and give it any legitimacy." Lau co-founded the Coalition Against Second Term (CAST) to draw attention to the flawed process of choosing the Chief executive, the lack of competition and the need for real democracy.

On international issues, Lau is supportive of self-determination for Taiwan. In 2003, she and another legislator, James To of the Democratic Party, attended a seminar entitled "Hong Kong Under One Country, Two Systems" organised by a pro-Taiwan independence group headed by former ROC President Lee Teng-hui. Lau stated that "Taiwan's future should be determined by the Taiwan people themselves". Her subsequent refusal to explicitly recognise Taiwan as a part of the PRC during an interview again drew criticism from more conservative sectors of the Hong Kong society, including attacks from pro-Beijing politician Leung Chun-ying, who became Chief executive in 2012.

Beside her legal problems, Lau has been the victim of several criminal nuisance cases, including telephone nuisance to her office in January and October 2003, and two occasions when food and/or faeces were splashed outside her office in Shatin, in July and September 2003. A woman and an old man were arrested and fined in connection with some of these cases. Most notably, an arson attack against Lau's office took place on 21 June 2004. Posters outside her office, about an upcoming rally, were burned. Words were left saying "All Chinese traitors must die."

She fiercely opposed the controversial national security bill in 2002 and 2003, as it was clashing with requirements of the Hong Kong Basic Law Article 23. After the 2003 July 1 march in 2003, she was the second candidate listed on the joint list with other pro-democrats parties in the New Territories East constituency and was elected again in the 2004 Legislative Council elections. She was also nominated chairwoman of the Legislative Council Finance Committee, position that she covered on and off until 2012.

In the Chief executive election held in 2005 after unpopular Tung Chee-hwa stepped down, Lau announced her interest in running for the post, to foster discussions over Hong Kong's democratic development. Due to the opposition from secretary-general Andrew To and from other members of The Frontier, Lau ultimately did not run in the election. Democratic Party chairman Lee Wing-tat remained the sole pro-democratic candidate in this election, but he did not manage to secure the threshold of 100 nominations necessary for the job.

=== Joining the Democratic Party and 2012 reform package ===
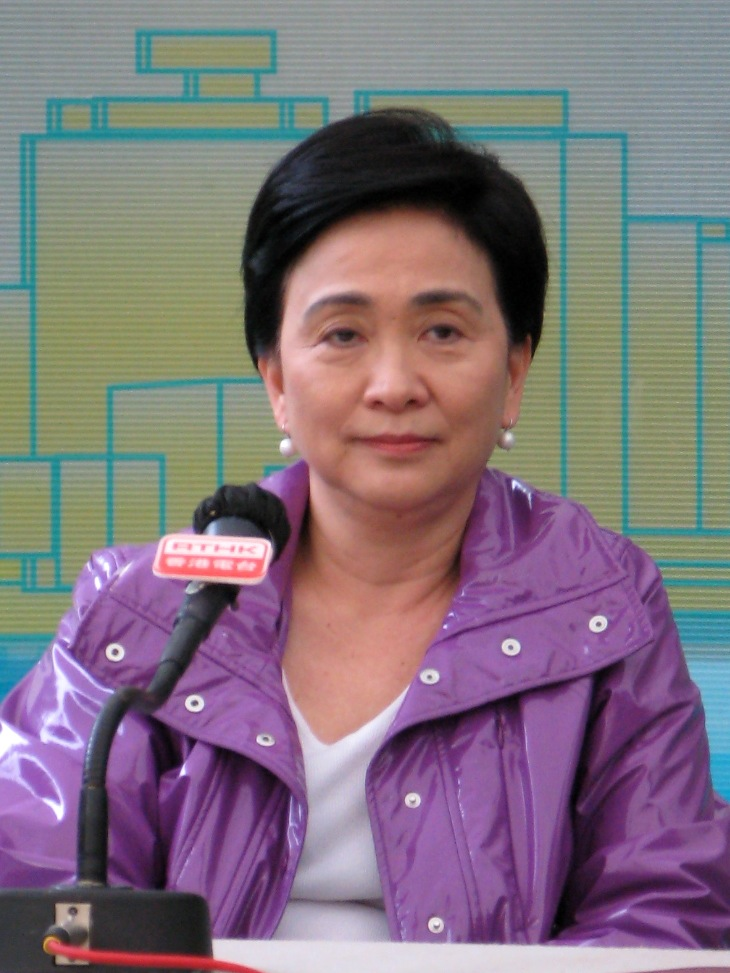
Lau at the City Forum in 2010

At the time of her election to LegCo in 1991, Lau was generally considered to be the most radical legislator in Hong Kong. However over time her radical image was overshadowed by activist Leung Kwok-hung and other radicals and her popular votes continuously declined. In September 2008 LegCo elections Emily Lau was barely re-elected in the New Territories East constituency, obtaining much fewer votes than in past elections. After reviewing the election results, in November 2008 The Frontier decided to merge with the more mainstream Democratic Party and Lau became one of its two vice-chairpersons. After this, her earlier strident stance toward the Beijing government and her fierce opposition to pro-Beijing supporters mellowed somewhat: this was perceived by some in a very negative way.

On 24 May 2010, Emily Lau and Democratic Party chairman Albert Ho, together with veteran Cheung Man-kwong met with Beijing representatives headed by Li Gang, the deputy director of the Liaison Office of the Central People's Government in Hong Kong, for negotiations over the 2012 constitutional reform package. This was the first meeting between Democratic Party leaders and senior officials from the Chinese central government since the Tiananmen protests of 1989. In June 2010, as vice-chairperson of the Democratic Party, she voted with her party in favour of the government's reform package, which included the party's late amendment – accepted by Beijing – to hold a popular vote for five new District Council (second) functional constituencies. Lau's less radical behaviour in this period, when compared to more radical populist figures Leung Kwok-hung and Wong Yuk-man, led her to become the main target for attacks by Wong and People Power.

=== Chairperson of the Democratic Party ===
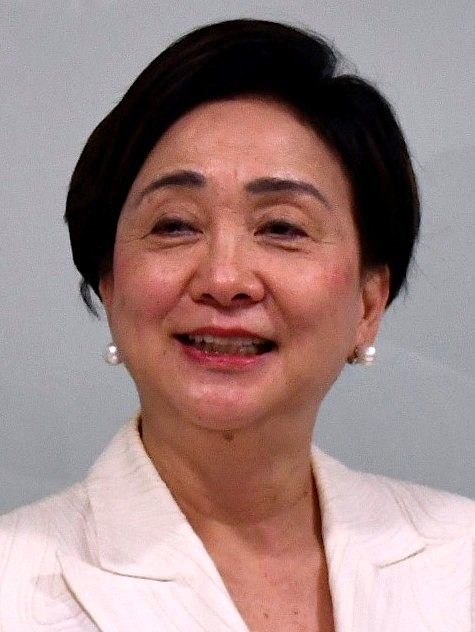
Lau in 2018

In September 2012, the Democratic Party suffered the worst defeat in the party's history in the 2012 Legislative Council election. Chairman Albert Ho resigned as chairman and Lau became acting Chairperson of the party for three months. In the party leadership election on 16 December 2012 she was elected chairperson, narrowly defeating vice-chairman Sin Chung-kai (149 votes to 133), therefore becoming the first female leader of the party since its formation in 1994.

Emily Lau and other Democratic Party members supported the 2014 Hong Kong protests. On 11 December 2014, Lau was arrested by the police with a group of about a hundred demonstrators staging a final sit-in, after a 75-day street occupation. Among these were other prominent democratic legislators including Martin Lee and Alan Leong.

On 14 December 2014, she was re-elected chairperson in the party leadership election, beating three rivals in the party's 20-year history.

On 1 January 2016, Emily Lau announced that she would not seek to be elected for an eighth term in the September election, therefore ending her legislator activity after serving for 25 years in the Legislative Council party primary. She participated to the election in the list of her younger colleague Lam Cheuk-ting and helped him get elected with nearly 40,000 votes.

Lau announced her resignation from the party chair post in December 2016 and was succeeded by legislator Wu Chi-wai. She also relinquished all of her party positions in the coming months. After her retirement from LegCo, she kept working as a television journalist, interviewing several political heavyweights in her shows.

== Reputation ==
Lau is considered a politician with strong convictions on the promotion of democratic human rights and equal opportunities in Hong Kong. She was labelled by the Hong Kong government as "radical", "outside mainstream public opinion" and a "solitary exception". She was among the most popular legislators throughout the 1990s. The last British Governor Chris Patten regarded Lau as a "professional politician, handsome, well informed and dashingly eloquent, who would have got to the top in any Western political system" and an "exponent of the incisive soundbite."

Since she joined the Democratic Party, her earlier strident stance toward the Beijing government mellowed somewhat. After she met with the mainland officials for negotiations over the 2010 Hong Kong electoral reform and voted with her party in favour of the reforms, she received ferocious attacks from radical democrats for her compromise.

== Personal life ==
In 1983, Lau married John Ball, a British journalist from the Sunday Times. The marriage lasted two years. In 1989, Lau remarried to a Hong Kong lawyer, Winston Poon, QC. They met in London during her visit to discuss the Hong Kong Basic Law with the members of Parliament of the United Kingdom. In 2006, she changed her marital status to "unmarried" in the Legislative Council office registry.

Stephen Lau Sing-hung, Emily Lau's brother, was a Chinese People's Political Consultative Conference Guangzhou committee member in the 1980s, was the chairman of Ernst & Young's tax service before he left in 2006 and was chief executive of China Timber Resources Group from 2007 to 2010. Despite his sister's political stance, he came to notoriety when he filed a claim in the Small Claims Tribunal for HK$314.60 against Occupy Central's organiser Benny Tai during the 2014 Hong Kong protests. The claim was filed since he had to spend HK$320 for a taxi ride on 6 October instead of just HK$5.40 for the bus fare from his home in Wong Nai Chung Gap Road to Central, since the occupation movement prevented the normal bus service. Emily Lau said she was not aware of her brother's action but insisted that her family did not support Stephen Lau's claim.

== See also ==
- Human rights in Hong Kong
- Politics of Hong Kong
- Women in politics

Legislative Council of Hong Kong
New constituency	Member of Legislative Council; Representative for New Territories East; 1991–1997	Replaced by Provisional Legislative Council
New parliament	Member of Legislative Council; Representative for New Territories East; 1998–2016	Succeeded by Lam Cheuk-ting
Preceded by Philip Wong	Chairman of Finance Committee; 2004–2007	Succeeded by Tam Yiu-chung
Preceded by Tam Yiu-chung	Chairman of Finance Committee; 2008–2012	Succeeded by Tommy Cheung
Party political offices
Preceded by Cyd Ho	Convenor of the Frontier; 1996–2008	Merged into Democratic Party
Preceded by Tik Chi-yuen	Vice Chairperson of Democratic Party; 2008–2012; Served alongside: Sin Chung-kai	Succeeded by Richard Tsoi; Lo Kin-hei
Preceded by Albert Ho	Chairperson of Democratic Party; 2012–2016	Succeeded by Wu Chi-wai
