= Wu Chi-wai =

Hong Kong politician

Wu Chi-wai MH
- 胡志偉
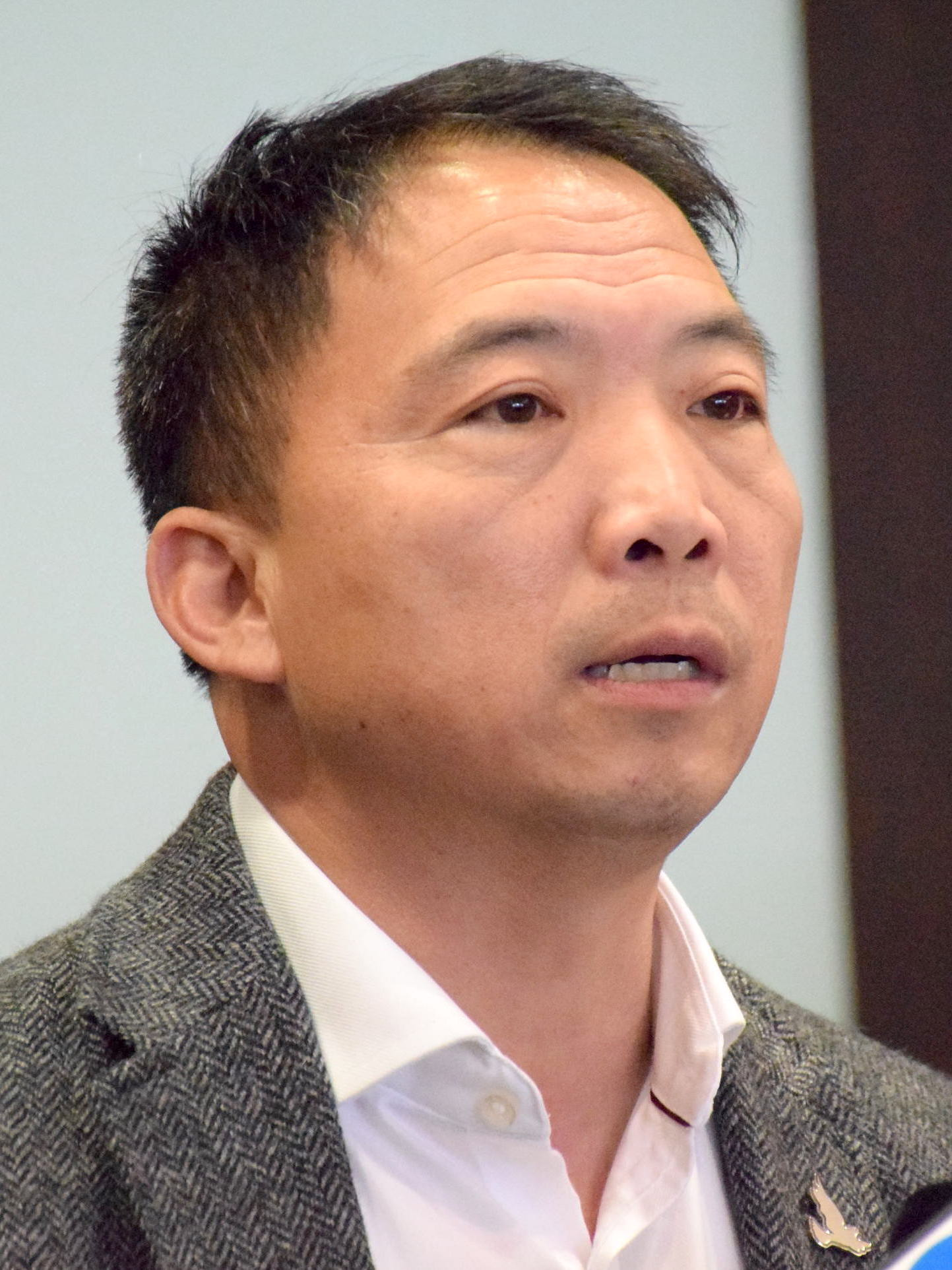
- Wu in 2017

Chairman of the Democratic Party
- In office 4 December 2016 – 6 December 2020
- Preceded by: Emily Lau
- Succeeded by: Lo Kin-hei

Member of the Legislative Council
- In office 1 October 2012 – 1 December 2020
- Preceded by: Fred Li
- Succeeded by: Constituency abolished
- Constituency: Kowloon East

Member of the Urban Council
- In office 1 April 1995 – 31 December 1999
- Preceded by: Cecilia Yeung
- Constituency: Choi Hung Wan and Ngau Chi Wan

Member of the Wong Tai Sin District Council
- In office 1 January 2000 – 31 December 2019
- Preceded by: Chan Chau-Faan
- Succeeded by: Rosanda Mok
- Constituency: King Fu

Personal details
- Born: 18 October 1962 (age 63) British Hong Kong
- Party: United Democrats (1990–1994); Democratic Party (1994–2025)
- Education: City University of Hong Kong; University of Wisconsin-Milwaukee
- Occupation: Legislative councillor district councillor

Wu Chi-wai, MH (Chinese: 胡志偉, born 18 October 1962) is a Hong Kong politician. He is the former chairman of the Democratic Party from 2016 to 2020 and a former member of the Legislative Council of Hong Kong for Kowloon East constituency from 2012 to 2020. He was also a member of Wong Tai Sin District Council from 1999 to 2019 and member of the Urban Council from 1995 to 1999.

== Education and early career ==
Wu was born in Hong Kong in 1962 to a grassroots family who had been living in the squatter areas of Kowloon Walled City, Shun Lee Estate, and Wong Tai Sin. He was educated at Queen's College, Hong Kong. He graduated in 1981 with a degree in social work at City University of Hong Kong. He later obtained a master's degree in Economics at University of Wisconsin–Milwaukee in 1991. Wu returned to Hong Kong and worked as an assistant for Legislative Councillor Conrad Lam, who was a member of the pro-democracy party United Democrats of Hong Kong, which later transformed into the Democratic Party in 1994.

== Urban and District Councillor ==
In the 1994 District Board election, Wu represented the Democratic Party who ran in the Upper Wong Tai Sin Estate but was defeated by Lam Man-fai of the pro-Beijing Democratic Alliance for the Betterment of Hong Kong (DAB) by a narrow margin of 94 votes. He subsequently got elected in the 1995 Urban Council election, beating veteran Urban Councillor Cecilia Yeung in Choi Hung Wan and Ngau Chi Wan and becoming among the last members of the Urban Council before it was abolished in 1999.

Wu has been member of the Wong Tai Sin District Council since he won in the King Fu constituency in the 1999 District Council elections. In the 2003 District Council elections, he grabbed in total of 4,480 votes in his King Fu constituency, only second to Leung Yiu-chung in Kwai Fong. In the 2007 elections, he was returned with the highest votes in the election and was called the "King of Votes". He stepped down from the District Council in the 2019, and his party's candidate Rosanda Mok then retained the seat.

== Legislative Councillor and Democratic Party chairman ==
Wu first sought a Legislative Council seat in 1998, when he contested the Sports, Performing Arts, Culture and Publication functional constituency, but lost to pro-establishment candidate Timothy Fok. He was on the Democratic Party ticket in Kowloon East in 2000 and 2004, taking the second or third place behind Szeto Wah and Fred Li. In the 2008 Legislative Council election, he ran his own ticket in Kowloon East next to Fred Li. Although Li was elected, Wu received the lowest votes of 16,365 and could not win a seat.

In 2012, Wu became the Democratic Party's candidate in Kowloon East after Fred Li announced his retirement from the Legislative Council. He received 43,764 votes, 15 percent of the total vote share and was elected to the Legislative Council. He was re-elected in 2016, with an increase of votes, 50,309 votes which counted for 15 percent of the vote share.

He contested in the Democratic Party chairmanship election in 2014. He entered in the second round with 104 votes against incumbent Emily Lau's 158 votes. He lost the second round to Lau by 145 to 171 votes. Wu ran again in the 2016 chairmanship election after Emily Lau retired from the Legislative Council and her party office. He was elected the party chairman uncontestedly, with 92 percent of the confidence vote.

On 11 November 2020, 15 democratic lawmakers including Wu resigned en masse in protest of a decision made by the central government in Beijing the same day, authorizing the Hong Kong government to dismiss politicians who were deemed to be a threat under the national security law promulgated in the city on 30 June 2020; the initial dismissal had concerned four democrats. Wu said that the Beijing ruling was a declaration of the "official death" of the One country, two systems principle.

== Legal cases ==
Wu was arrested on 1 November 2020, along with six other democratic councillors, in connection with a melee that broke out in the Legislative Council on 8 May 2020. On that day, Starry Lee, the incumbent chair of the House Committee of the Legislative Council, had attempted to commence a meeting of the committee after extended stalling tactics of the pan-democratic camp over the previous months.

On 8 December 2020, Wu was arrested for allegedly inciting and participating in the unauthorized 1 July march that year. Seven other democrats were arrested the same day on similar charges.

On 6 January 2021, Wu was among 53 members of the pro-democratic camp who were arrested under the national security law, specifically its provision regarding subversion. The group stood accused of organizing and/or participating in unofficial primary elections held by the camp in July 2020. During the arrest, police allegedly found a BN(O) passport belonging to Wu, a breach of bail conditions for the illegal assembly charge, which included the surrender of all travel documents. Wu was detained at a Correctional Services facility until a hearing on 8 January at West Kowloon Court. At that hearing, Wu was found to have breached bail conditions, had his bail revoked, and was detained due to the magistrate seeing a substantial risk of Wu absconding. On 7 May 2021, High Court judge Esther Toh granted Wu an emergency bail application to attend his father's funeral, in an appeal of the Correctional Services Department's earlier refusal.

On 30 May 2024, Wu was convicted by a Hong Kong national security court of conspiring to commit subversion, and on 19 November 2024, he was sentenced to 4 years and 5 months’ incarceration. On 30 June 2026, he was released from Stanley Prison.

On 8 July 2024, the court continued hearing mitigation pleas for the Kowloon East candidates in the Hong Kong 47 national security case. Defence counsel made submissions on sentencing principles, suggesting that if the court adopted the three‑tier penalty framework under Article 22 of the National Security Law, Wu Chi‑wai should be categorised at the second tier, namely an "active participant" rather than an organiser or principal offender. Several former senior government officials, including Anthony Cheung and Law Chi‑kwong, submitted mitigation letters on Wu’s behalf. They described Wu as a civil, rational, and pragmatic politician, even when he disagreed with government policy.

On the morning of June 30, 2026, Wu returned to his residence after being released from prison.

== Travel to UK ==
On July 22, 2026, Wu traveled from Hong Kong to the UK to reunite with his family. Upon his arrival, border officials at Heathrow Airport confiscated his passport, granted him only seven days of immigration bail, and ordered him to be deported by Wednesday, July 29, 2026. Human rights lawyer Paul Harris (former chairman of the Hong Kong Bar Association) said in an interview with Green Bean Media that the UK Home Office’s initial decision to refuse entry and issue a deportation order to Wu Chi-wai was "doubly wrong" because border authorities made two serious foundational errors, wrongly assuming an intention to overstay and misunderstanding their own immigration rules as the Home Office completely misapplied its own guidelines regarding visa schemes for Hong Kong citizens.

On 27 July 2026, Paul Harris and his legal team confirmed that Wu Chi-wai's stay status had been successfully resolved.

== See also ==
- List of Chinese pro-democracy activists

Political offices
Preceded by Cecilia Yeung	Member of Urban Council; Representative for Choi Hung Wan and Ngau Chi Wan; 1995–1999	Council abolished
Preceded by Chan Chau-faan	Member of Wong Tai Sin District Council; Representative for King Fu; 2000–2019	Succeeded by Rosanda Mok
Legislative Council of Hong Kong
Preceded by Fred Li	Member of Legislative Council; Representative for Kowloon East; 2012–2020	Constituency abolished
Preceded by Tanya Chan	Convenor of pro-democracy camp 2020	Vacant
Party political offices
Preceded by Emily Lau	Chairman of Democratic Party; 2016–2020	Succeeded by Lo Kin-hei
