= Lo Kin-hei =

Chinese politician in Hong Kong

- 羅健熙
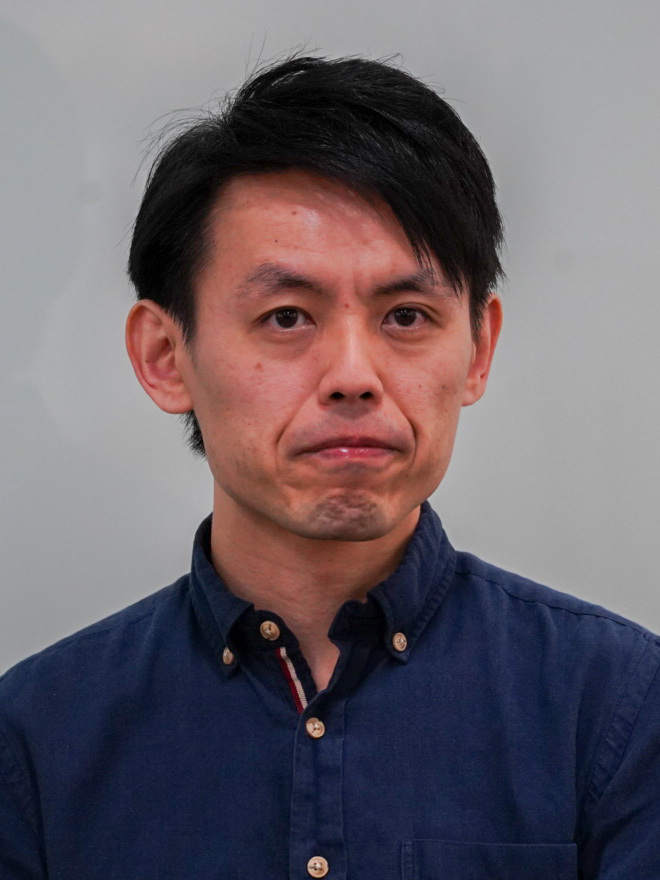
- Lo in 2023

Chairman of the Democratic Party
- In office 6 December 2020 – 14 December 2025
- Preceded by: Wu Chi-wai
- Succeeded by: Party dissolved

Vice-Chairman of the Democratic Party
- In office 16 December 2012 – 6 December 2020
- Chairperson: Emily Lau; Wu Chi-wai
- Preceded by: Emily Lau; Sin Chung-kai
- Succeeded by: Lam Cheuk-ting; Edith Leung

Member of the Southern District Council
- In office 1 January 2012 – 10 July 2021
- Preceded by: Wong Che-ngai
- Constituency: Lei Tung II

Personal details
- Born: 1 June 1984 (age 41) Hong Kong
- Party: Democratic Party
- Education: Sing Yin Secondary School
- Alma mater: University of Hong Kong (BSW)
- Occupation: Social worker District councillor

Lo Kin-hei (Chinese: 羅健熙; born 1 June 1984) is a Hong Kong politician who was the final chairman of the Democratic Party and a former member of the Southern District Council, representing the Lei Tung II constituency from 2012 to 2021.

== Career ==
Born in 1984, Lo graduated from the University of Hong Kong with the Bachelor of Social Work in 2006. He is a registered social worker. He joined the Democratic Party and first contested in the 2007 District Council elections, contesting in the Lei Tung II constituency covering the Lei Tung Estate in Ap Lei Chau. He lost by a narrow margin of 27 votes. He contested in the same constituency in the next District Council elections in 2011 and succeeded in taking a seat with 2,346 votes.

He was also member of the pan-democratic candidate list "Demo-Social 60" in the 2011 Election Committee Subsector election for the Social Welfare Subsector and was elected.

In the party leadership election in December 2012, Lo was elected as Vice-Chairman with his senior Richard Tsoi, becoming the youngest Vice-Chairman in party's history.

After the 2019 District Council election, Lo called the vote in effect a "vote of no-confidence" in the political establishment, including Hong Kong's leader, Carrie Lam, and key Chinese officials such as Zhang Xiaoming, head of the State Council's Hong Kong and Macau Affairs Office.

On 15 July 2020, Lo was arrested at his home, and later released on bail, for having participated in an unauthorized protest outside Hong Kong Polytechnic University on 18 November 2019. The university campus had been the venue of major confrontations between protesters and police at that time. Lo and four others were arrested on the same day in relation to the protest, all of whom were scheduled to appear before the courts on 21 August. On 30 November 2022, a district judge ruled that the evidence to prove that Lo had knowingly participated in an unauthorized protest was insufficient and acquitted him of the charge. The Department of Justice filed an appeal against the verdict. Lo was rearrested on 7 December 2022, and released after having settled his bail conditions, including surrendering his travel documents.

Political offices
Preceded by Wong Che-ngai	Member of Southern District Council; Representative for Lei Tung II; 2012–2021	Vacant
Preceded by Chu Ching-hong	Chairman of Southern District Council; 2020–2021	Vacant
Party political offices
Preceded by Emily Lau; Sin Chung-kai	Vice Chairperson of Democratic Party; 2012–2020; Served alongside: Richard Tsoi, Andrew Wan, Li Wing-shing	Succeeded by Lam Cheuk-ting; Edith Leung
Preceded by Wu Chi-wai	Chairperson of Democratic Party; 2020–present	Incumbent
