= Ramon Yuen =

Hong Kong politician (born 1986)

Ramon Yuen Hoi-man
- 袁海文
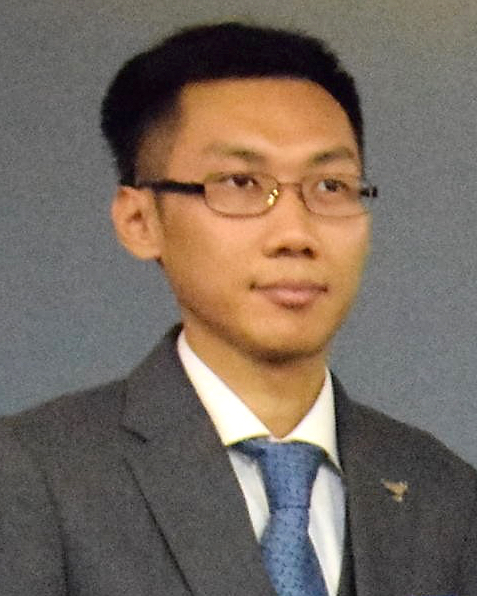

Member of the Sham Shui Po District Council
- Incumbent
- Assumed office 1 January 2016
- Preceded by: New constituency
- Constituency: Lai Chi Kok Central

Personal details
- Born: September 24, 1986 (age 40) British Hong Kong
- Party: Democratic Party
- Education: Hong Kong Polytechnic University
- Occupation: District Councilor

Ramon Yuen Hoi-man (Chinese: 袁海文; born 1986) is a Hong Kong politician. He is the Treasurer of the Democratic Party and member of the Sham Shui Po District Council for Lai Chi Kok Central.

== Biography ==
He was educated at the Hong Kong Polytechnic University and graduated in 2009 with degree in Business Administration and Engineering. He considered in joining Regina Ip's Savantas Policy Institute but ended up joining the Democratic Party.

He first contested in the 2011 District Council elections in Mong Kok South but lost to incumbent Chau Chun-fai. He ran on the Democratic Party's ticket in Kowloon West in the 2012 Legislative Council election with Helena Wong as a fourth candidate. He became the party's treasurer in 2015.

He ran in the newly created Lai Chi Kok Central constituency in the 2015 District Council elections. He defeated Bruce Li Ki-fung of the Business and Professionals Alliance for Hong Kong (BPA) and became the member of the Sham Shui Po District Council.

In the March 2018 Kowloon West by-election, he joined the pro-democracy primary for representing the pro-democracy camp in the general election, running against Yiu Chung-yim and Frederick Fung. He ranked the third in the primary, losing to Yiu and Fung as a result.

Party political offices
| Preceded by Stanley Ng | Treasurer of the Democratic Party; 2015–present | Incumbent |
Political offices
| New constituency | Member of the Sham Shui Po District Council; Representative for Lai Chi Kok Central; 2016–present | Incumbent |
