= 2006 Democratic Party (HK) leadership election =

Democratic Party (HK) leadership election
- 17 December 2006
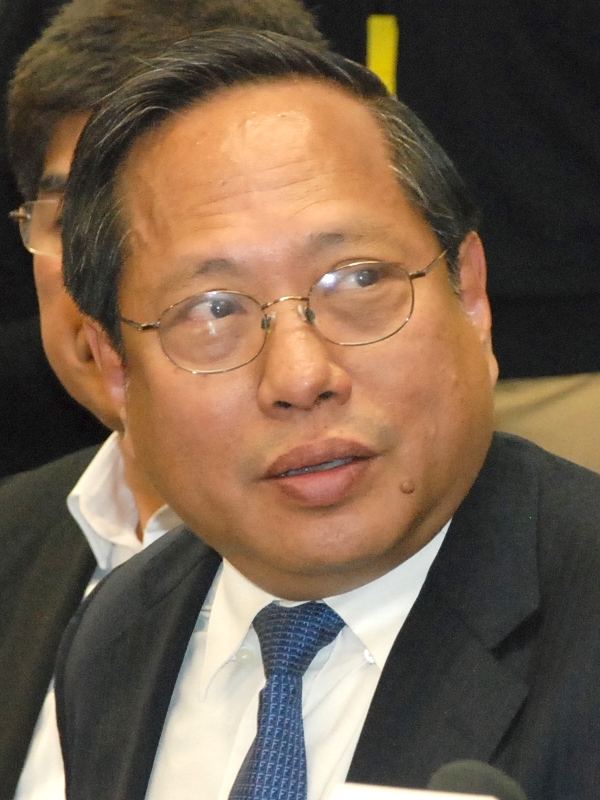

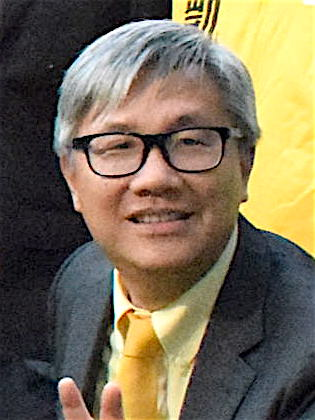
Candidate	Albert Ho	Chan King-ming
Ballot	204	81
Percentage	71.6%	28.4%
Chairman before election
Lee Wing-tat
Elected Chairman
Albert Ho

The Democratic Party leadership election was held on 17 December 2006 for the 30-member 7th Central Committee of the Democratic Party in Hong Kong, including chairman and two vice-chairman posts. Legislative Council member and party's Vice-Chairman Albert Ho from the mainstreamer faction defeated the incumbent Vice-Chairman Chan King-ming from the Young Turks faction with a large margin, succeeding Lee Wing-tat as the chairman of the party.

== Eligibility ==
The Central Committee was elected by the party congress. All public office holders, including the members of the Legislative Council and District Councils, are eligible to vote in the party congress. Every 30 members can also elect a delegate who holds one vote in the congress.

== Overview ==
The Democratic Party was suffering from the intra-party factional struggles between the mainstreamers and Young Turk reformists, while it was also facing the external challenge from the newly established Civic Party from the same pan-democracy camp.

In March 2006, the Mainstreamer faction alleged that some senior members were involved in spying activities of China. The "suspects" were all Young Turks Reformist members including vice-chairman and chairman of the New Territories East branch Chan King-ming and District Councillor Gary Fan Kwok-wai in New Territories East.

On 27 November, the incumbent vice-chairman and legislative council member Albert Ho announced he would run for the chairman post with a cabinet list, including legislative council member Sin Chung-kai and Central Committee member Tik Chi-yuen running for the two vice-chairman posts, Peggy Ha Ving-vung for the secretary post and Cheung Yin-tung for the treasurer post.

Supported by the reformist Young Turks faction, another incumbent vice-chairman, Chan King-ming, ran for the chairman for the second time after his defeat by Lee Wing-tat in the last party leadership election in 2004.

== Elections ==
Chairman election
Candidate	Votes	%
Albert Ho Chun-yan	204	71.6
Chan King-ming	81	28.4

Vice-Chairmen election
Candidate	Votes	%
Sin Chung-kai	180	32.7
Tik Chi-yuen	170	30.9
Fung Wai-kwong	79	14.4
Shirley Ho Suk-ping	73	13.3
Cosmas Kwong Kwok-chuen	48	8.7

Central Committee election
Candidate	Votes
Yeung Sum	221
Law Chi-kwong	216
Lee Wing-tat	210
Szeto Wah	210
Wu Chi-wai	209
Cheung Yin-tung	208
Josephine Chan Shu-ying	207
Simon Lee Shiu-man	200
Ng Wing-fai	197
Nelson Wong Kin-shing	197
Wong Sing-chi	196
Mark Li Kin-yin	195
Tsui Hon-kwong	194
James To Kun-sun	192
Howard Lam Tsz-kin	191
Chai Man-hon	188
Chan Ka-wai	187
Peggy Ha Ving-vung	179
Law Chun-ngai	179
Ng Kim-sing	176
Mok Siu-lun	166
Cheung Yuet-lan	163
Kwong Chun-yu	158
Lam Wing-yin	156
Yuen Bun-keung	153
Leung Kai-wah	150
Joanna Leung Suk-ching	150
Fung Wai-kwong	144
Chiu Chung-lam	121
Gary Fan Kwok-wai	114
Chan King-ming	110
Shirley Ho Suk-ping	96
Cosmas Kwong Kwok-chuen	96
Yam Kai-bong	98
Kwan Wing-yip	89
Raymond Luk Yiu-man	65
Wong Chun-wai	60
Sham Wing-kan	51
Lai Chi-keong	46
Wong Leung-hi	46
Lau Tai-sang	36
Lam Chung-hoi	32
Cheung Po-hop	30
Chow Wai-tung	22
Wong Fung-yau	21

== Results ==
The mainstreamer legislator Albert Ho defeated reformist Vice-Chairman Chan King-ming by winning 204 to 81 votes. Sin Chung-kai and Tik Chi-yuen from Ho's team also elected Vice-Chairmen with 180 and 170 votes respectively, defeating Cosmas Kwong Kwok-chuen the Young Turk reformist, Andrew Fung Wai-kwong of the Meeting Point faction, and Shirley Ho Suk-ping supported by legislator and founding Chairman Martin Lee Chu-ming and legislator Andrew Cheng Kar-foo. 26 of the 27 mainstreamers candidates were elected except for Chiu Chung-lam, chairman of the Kowloon East branch. Andrew Fung was the single candidate of the Meeting Point faction who was elected to the Central Committee. The seven reformist members were all defeated.

The elected members of the 7th Central Committee are listed as following:

- Chairman: Albert Ho
- Vice-Chairmen: Sin Chung-kai, Tik Chi-yuen
- Secretary: Peggy Ha
- Treasurer: Cheung Yin-tung
- Executive Committee Members:

- Chan Ka-wai
- Josephine Chan Shu-ying
- Howard Lam Tsz-kin
- Law Chi-kwong
- Lee Wing-tat
- Ng Wing-fai
- Szeto Wah
- Tsui Hon-kwong
- Wong Sing-chi
- Yeung Sum

- Central Committee Members:

- Chai Man-hon
- Cheung Yuet-lan
- Fung Wai-kwong
- Kwong Chun-yu
- Lam Wing-yin
- Law Chun-ngai
- Lee Shiu-man
- Joanna Leung Suk-ching
- Mark Li Kin-yin
- Mok Siu-lun
- Ng Kim-sing
- James To Kun-sun
- Wong Kin-shing
- Wu Chi-wai
- Yuen Bun-keung

== Aftermath ==
The newly elected Chairman Albert Ho said his team won because the party members understood that they were in crisis and needed a strong leadership. He called for the intra-party solidarity.

Political scientist Ivan Choy commented that the election results showed the loss of trust between the mainstreamers and reformists. The New Territories East branch which the reformists dominated would confront the party's central authorities. That might lead to another split if the conflicts continued and bad election results came out badly in the district council elections next year.
