= 2002 Democratic Party (HK) leadership election =

Political party leadership vote in Hong Kong

Democratic Party (HK) leadership election
- 1 December 2002
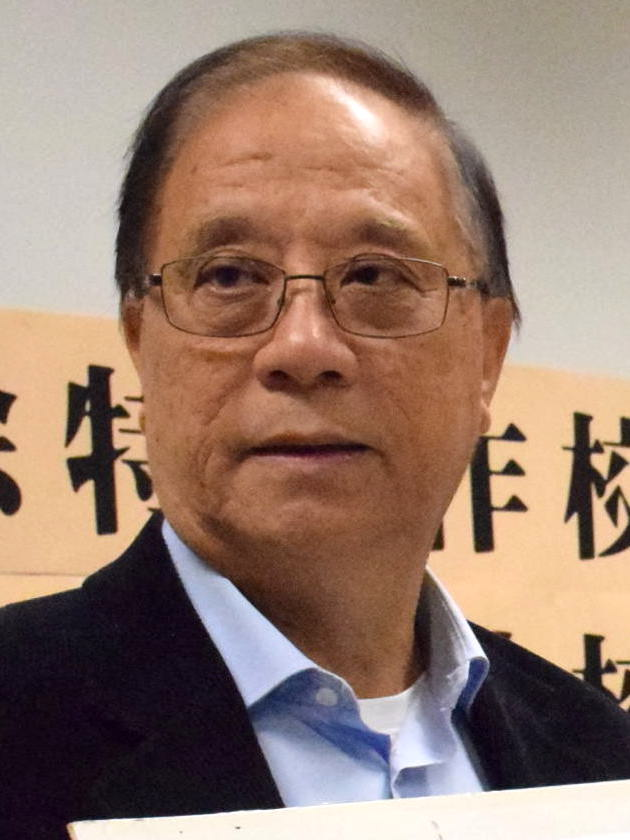
Candidate	Yeung Sum
Ballot	121
Percentage	93.1%
Chairman before election
Martin Lee
Elected Chairman
Yeung Sum

The Democratic Party leadership election was held on 1 December 2002 for the 30-member 5th Central Committee of the Democratic Party in Hong Kong, including chairman and two vice-chairman posts. Incumbent vice-chairman was elected as chairman uncontestedly, succeeding founding chairman Martin Lee Chu-ming.

== Eligibility ==
The Central Committee was elected by the party congress. All public office holders, including the members of the Legislative Council and District Councils, are eligible to vote in the party congress. Every 30 members can also elect a delegate who holds one vote in the congress.

== Overview ==
Founding chairman Martin Lee stepped down according to the four-term limit. There was only Yeung Sum's team contested for the posts. Yeung Sum received 121 votes for and 9 votes against, 2 more votes against him than Martin Lee in 2000. Albert Ho Chun-yan and Lee Wing-tat elected as Vice-Chairmen, receiving 132 and 129 votes of confidence respectively. Albert Chan Wai-yip, the pro-grassroots "radical" legislator for the New Territories West constituency quit the party as he said he would if Yeung Sum became chairman.

After the election, Yeung Sum said since the party was marginalised by Beijing, the Democratic Party was accused of playing negative role in the "one country, two systems" and unification with Taiwan. Therefore, his task would be establishing normal relationship with the central and also SAR governments, and forming solidarity within the party.

The elected members of the 5th Central Committee are listed as following:

- Chairman: Yeung Sum
- Vice-Chairmen: Albert Ho, Lee Wing-tat
- Secretary: Cheung Yin-tung
- Treasurer: Tsui Hon-kwong
- Executive committee members:

- Chan King-ming
- Chan Ka-wai
- Josephine Chan Shu-ying
- Cheung Man-kwong
- Law Chi-kwong
- Ng Wing-fai
- Szeto Wah

- Central committee members:

- Cheung Wing-fai
- Cheung Yuet-lan
- Chow Wai-tung
- Ho Wai-to
- Hui Kei-cheung
- Kwan Wing-yip
- Law Chun-ngai
- Joanna Leung Suk-ching
- Mark Li Kin-yin
- Ma Kei
- Sin Chung-kai
- James To Kun-sun
- Wong Leung-hi
- Wong Sing-chi
- Zachary Wong Wai-yin
- Wu Chi-wai
- Yeung Sik-pik
- Yuen Bun-keung
