= 2010 Democratic Party (HK) leadership election =

Democratic Party (HK) leadership election
- 19 December 2010
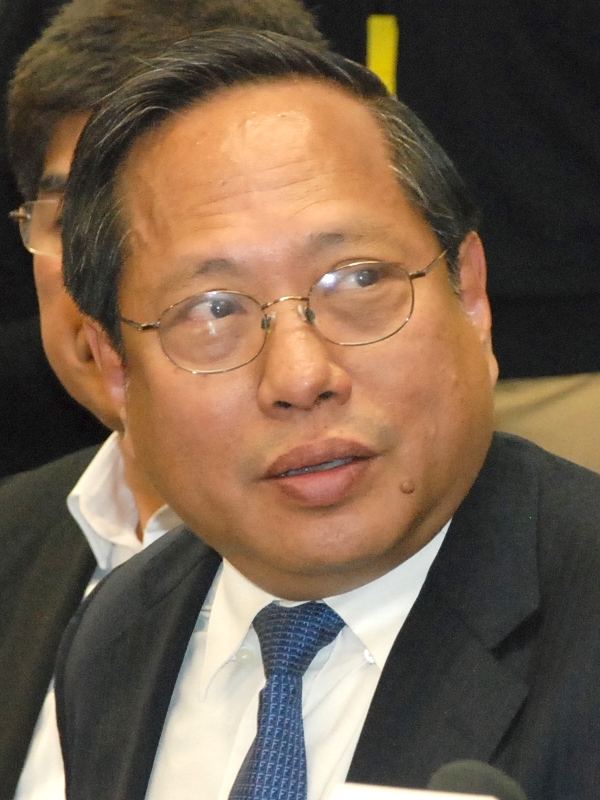
Candidate	Albert Ho
Percentage	94%
Chairman before election
Albert Ho
Elected Chairman
Albert Ho

The Democratic Party leadership election was held on 19 December 2010 for the 30-member 9th Central Committee of the Democratic Party in Hong Kong, including chairman and two vice-chairman posts. The incumbent Chairman Albert Ho, Vice-Chairmen Emily Lau and Sin Chung-kai were all re-elected uncontestedly.

== Eligibility ==
The Central Committee was elected by the party congress. All public office holders, including the members of the Legislative Council and District Councils, are eligible to vote in the party congress. Every 30 members can also elect a delegate who holds one vote in the congress.

== Overview ==
The Democratic Party leadership election was held after the party's decision on supporting the controversial electoral reform package in June 2010. The party made an historic breakthrough of reaching agreement with the representatives of the Central People's Government since the Tiananmen massacre in 1989. The revised proposal suggested by the Democratic Party was accepted by Beijing and subsequently passed in the Legislative Council with Democratic Party's votes. The party's decision further split the divided pan-democracy camp and the relatively "radical" democratic party League of Social Democrats accused the Democratic Party for selling out Hong Kong people. In the following 2010 July 1 march, the party leaders received verbal attacks and mocked by some other protestors. Just before the party congress, 30 members announced to leave the party, including 7 founding members and 7 District Councillors in the New Territories East. Most of the leaving members were the backbones of the lately-formed Neo Democrats such as the former Vice-Chairman Chan King-ming. They said their leave was largely because they did not agree with the party's stance on the 2010 electoral reform package. They also requested the party to apologise for its "mistake".

Chairman Albert Ho admitted it caused certain damage to the party, but political parties' development is a natural phenomena. Emily Lau and Nelson Wong Sing-chi, the New Territories East legislators would take remedial actions, such as open more district offices in the region.

== Results ==
Incumbent Chairman Albert Ho, who played a big role in the 2010 electoral reform negotiation, was re-elected with 94% of the vote unchallenged. Vice-Chairmen Emily Lau and Sin Chung-kai also retained their seats. The elected members of the 9th Central Committee are listed as following:

- Chairman: Albert Ho
- Vice-Chairmen: Emily Lau, Sin Chung-kai
- Secretary: Cheung Yin-tung
- Treasurer: Tsui Hon-kwong
- Executive Committee Members:

- Josephine Chan Shu-ying
- Eric Lam Lap-chi
- Lee Wing-tat
- Ricky Or Yiu-lam
- Christopher Tsoi Yu-lung
- Andrew Wan Siu-kin
- Nelson Wong Sing-chi
- Wu Chi-wai
- Yeung Sum

- Central Committee Members:

- Cheung Yuet-lan
- Andrew Chiu Ka-yin
- Joseph Chow Kam-siu
- Chui Pak-tai
- Andrew Fung Wai-kwong
- Lam Chung-hoi
- Lam Ho-yeung
- Law Chi-kwong
- Leung Ka-yu
- Joanna Leung Suk-ching
- Mark Li Kin-yin
- Li Wing-shing
- Mok Siu-lun
- Stanley Ng Wing-fai
- Wong King-fong
- Helena Wong Pik-wan
