= 2004 Democratic Party (HK) leadership election =

Democratic Party (HK) leadership election
- 17 December 2004
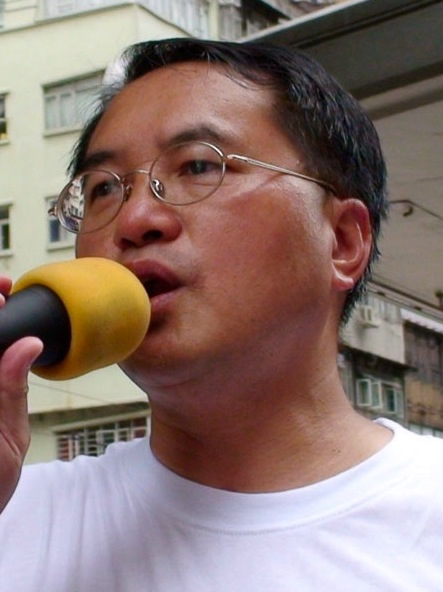

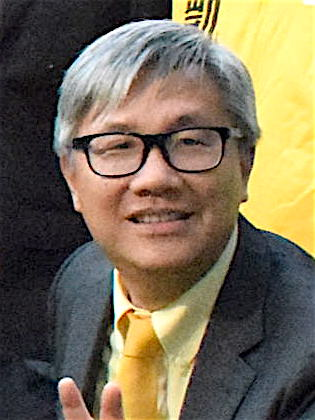
Candidate	Lee Wing-tat	Chan King-ming
Ballot	189	113
Percentage	62.6%	37.4%
Chairman before election
Yeung Sum
Elected Chairman
Lee Wing-tat

The Democratic Party leadership election was held on 12 December 2004 for the 30-member of the 6th Central Committee of the Democratic Party in Hong Kong, including chairman and two vice-chairman posts. It was the first contested chairmanship election in the party's history. Legislative Council member and party's Vice-Chairman Lee Wing-tat defeated the Chan King-ming, succeeding Yeung Sum as the chairman of the party.

== Eligibility ==
The Central Committee was elected by the party congress. All public office holders, including the members of the Legislative Council and District Councils, are eligible to vote in the party congress. Every 30 members can also elect a delegate who holds one vote in the congress.

== Overview ==
Chairman Yeung Sum announced he would not seek for re-election after the party performed badly in the 2004 Hong Kong Legislative Council election in September.However, Albert Ho Chun-yan said he was not keen to run for the chairmanship because he was busy working for other organisations, such as the Hong Kong Alliance in Support of Patriotic Democratic Movements in China, where he was the secretary. Chan King-ming, who was seen as a Reformist said a genuine contest for the leadership was necessary for the party's future.

== Elections ==
Chairman election
Candidate	Votes	%
Lee Wing-tat	189	62.6
Chan King-ming	113	37.4

Vice-Chairmen election
Candidate	Votes	%
Albert Ho Chun-yan	205	40.5
Chan King-ming	205	40.5
Zachary Wong Wai-yin	96	19.0

Central Committee election
Candidate	Votes
Law Chi-kwong	248
Yeung Sum	238
Szeto Wah	232
Josephine Chan Shu-ying	220
Wu Chi-wai	209
Sin Chung-kai	208
Chan Ka-wai	202
Tsui Hon-kwong	200
Mark Li Kin-yin	199
James To Kun-sun	199
Cheung Yin-tung	196
Stanley Ng Wing-fai	193
Wong Suet-ying	193
Tik Chi-yuen	188
Yeung Siu-pik	187
Wong Sing-chi	180
Kwan Wing-yip	179
Fung Wai-kwong	172
Horward Lam Tsz-kin	170
Zachary Wong Wai-yin	168
Gary Fan Kwok-wai	162
Yuen Bun-keung	156
Law Chun-ngai	151
Cosmas Kwong Kwok-chuen	150
Raymond Lee Wai-man	150
Joanna Leung Suk-ching	143
Ng Kam-sing	126
Wong Chun-wai	126
Alan Tam King-wah	125
Chow Wai-tung	124
Joseph Chow Kam-siu	111
Lam Ho-yeung	109
Chiu Chung-lam	105
Stephen Fong Chun-bong	85
Lam Wing-yin	83
Wong Kin-shing	78
Lai Chi-keong	74
Yam Kai-bong	74
Wong Leung-hi	60
Lau Tai-sang	52
Sham Wing-kan	46
Wong Fung-yau	10

== Results ==
In the election on 12 December, Lee Wing-tat, the major figure in the mainstreamer faction defeated Chan King-ming from the Young Turks faction with 189 to 113 votes. Chan who was also a vice-chairman candidate and Albert Ho both got elected with 205 votes, higher than the third candidate Zachary Wong Wai-yin who only got 96 votes, being elected as the new two vice-chairmen.

The elected members of the 6th Central Committee are listed as following:

- Chairman: Lee Wing-tat
- Vice-Chairmen: Albert Ho, Chan King-ming
- Secretary: Cheung Yin-tung
- Treasurer: Tsui Hon-kwong
- Executive Committee Members:

- Chan Ka-wai
- Josephine Chan Shu-ying
- Gary Fan Kwok-wai
- Fung Wai-kwong
- Howard Lam Tsz-kin
- Law Chi-kwong
- Ng Wing-fai
- Szeto Wah
- Wong Sing-chi
- Yeung Sum

- Central Committee Members:

- Kwan Wing-yip
- Cosmas Kwong Kwok-chuen
- Law Chun-ngai
- Raymond Lee Wai-man
- Joanna Leung Suk-ching
- Mark Li Kin-yin
- Ng Kim-sing
- Sin Chung-kai
- Tik Chi-yuen
- James To Kun-sun
- Wong Suet-ying
- Zachary Wong Wai-yin
- Wu Chi-wai
- Yeung Sik-pik
- Yuen Bun-keung

== Notes ==
1. Ng Kim-sing and Wong Chun-wai received the same number of votes so a by-election was held later, in which Ng was elected to the Central Committee.
