= 2000 Democratic Party (HK) leadership election =

Democratic Party (HK) leadership election
- 17 December 2000
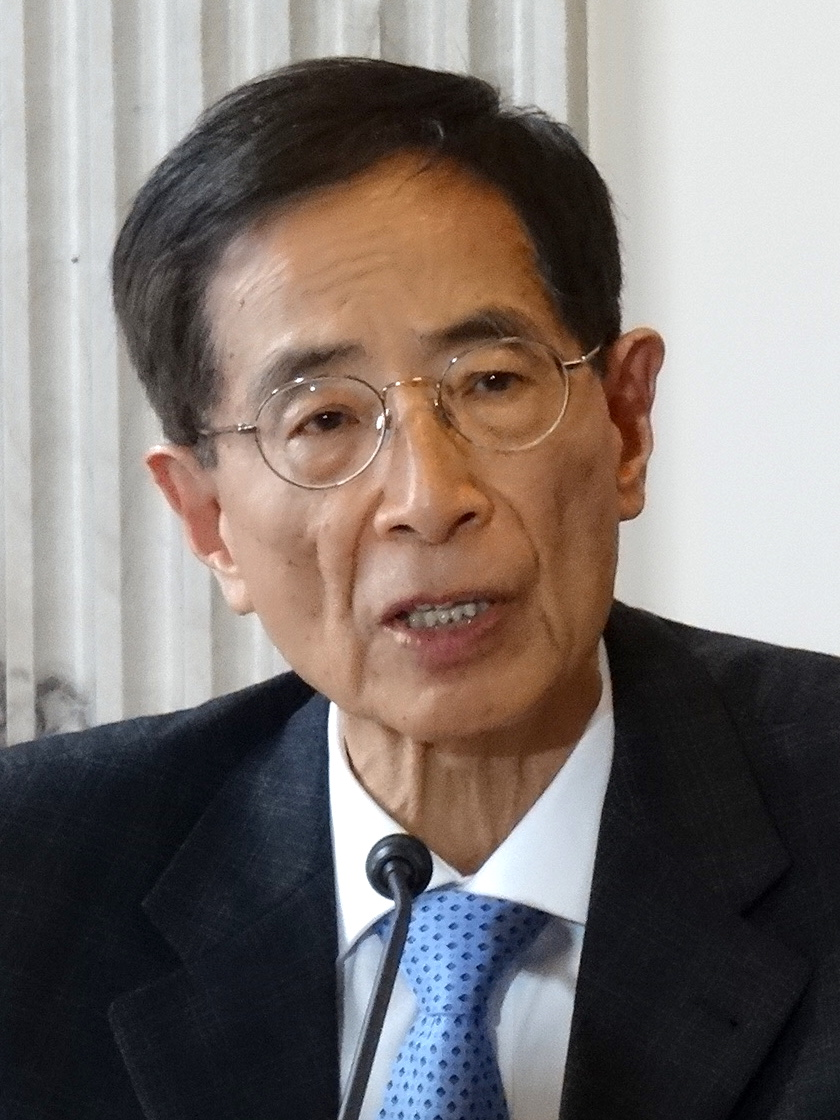
Candidate	Martin Lee
Ballot	230
Percentage	81.8%
Chairman before election
Martin Lee
Elected Chairman
Martin Lee

The Democratic Party leadership election was held on 17 December 2000 for the 30-member 4th Central Committee of the Democratic Party in Hong Kong, including chairman and two vice-chairman posts. Founding Chairman Martin Lee Chu-ming was re-elected uncontestedly for the fourth consecutive term.

== Eligibility ==
The Central Committee was elected by the party congress. All public office holders, including the members of the Legislative Council and District Councils, are eligible to vote in the party congress. Every 30 members can also elect a delegate who holds one vote in the congress.

== Overview ==
The Founding Chairman Martin Lee Chu-ming had been holding the Chairmanship since 1994. According to the party's rule, the party chairmanship is restricted with four-term limit, thus it would be the last term for Martin Lee to run for Chairman.

The Democratic Party suffered from the decline in popularity and intra-party struggles in recent years. In the last LegCo election in September, the party lost 170,000 votes compared to 1998. The Young Turks faction was at the edge of splitting with the party. They were discontent with the monopoly of the Central Committee by the party leaders and the party's position on grassroots issues. They had even organised the Social Democratic Forum, which catered more to the grassroots interests.

Some members thought that the Chairman should be responsible for the problems within the party. They disliked Martin Lee supporting Audrey Eu for contesting the 2000 Hong Kong Island by-election, rather his own party members.

== Results ==
The Young Turks did not show up in the party congress. Martin Lee was elected with 230 for, 7 against and 55 abstentions, with Law Chi-kwong and Lee Wing-tat elected as Vice-Chairmen uncontestedly. Cheung Yin-tung succeeded Law Chi-kwong as the party's Secretary. Martin Lee said it was a warning to him as he got so many abstentions than last election. He stated that he should concentrated more on his work. 28 candidates contested for 27 seats in the Central Committee, only Tai Po District Councillor Edward Lee Chi-shing unelected.

The 4th Central Committee was formed as following:

- Chairman: Martin Lee
- Vice-Chairmen: Law Chi-kwong, Lee Wing-tat
- Secretary: Cheung Yin-tung
- Treasurer: Wong Bing-kuen
- Executive Committee Members:

- Chan King-ming
- Chan Ka-wai
- Josephine Chan Shu-ying
- Cheung Man-kwong
- Albert Ho Chun-yan
- Ng Wing-fai
- Szeto Wah
- Tsui Hon-kwong
- Wu Chi-wai
- Yeung Sum

- Central Committee Members:

- Chan Chak-chiu
- Cheung Wing-fai
- Cheung Yuet-lan
- Chow Wai-tung
- Fung Wai-kwong
- Ho Wai-to
- Law Chung-ngai
- Almustafa Lee Lap-hong
- Mark Li Kin-yin
- Sin Chung-kai
- James To Kun-sun
- Wong Sing-chi
- Zachary Wong Wai-yin
- Wong Leung-hi
- Yuen Bun-keung
