= 2008 Democratic Party (HK) leadership election =

Democratic Party (HK) leadership election
- 14 December 2008
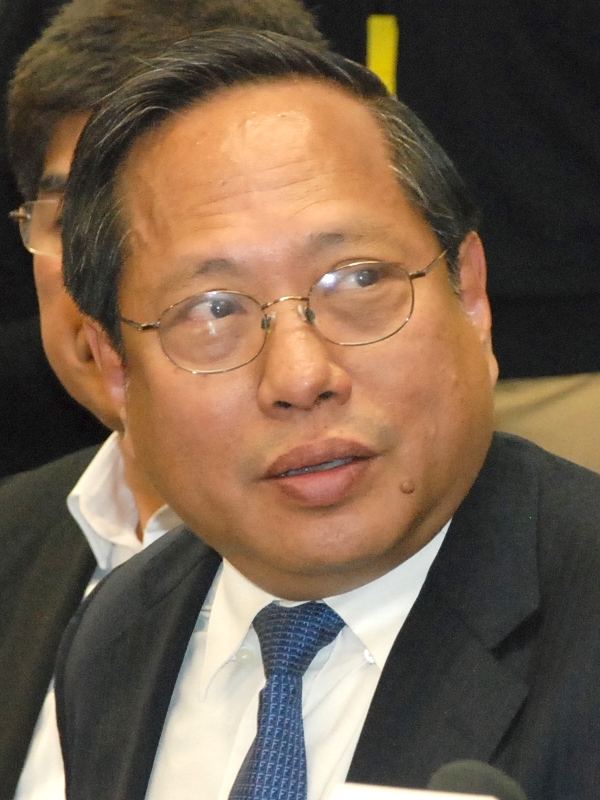
Candidate	Albert Ho
Percentage	93%
Chairman before election
Albert Ho
Elected Chairman
Albert Ho

The Democratic Party leadership election was held on 14 December 2008 for the 30-member 8th Central Committee of the Democratic Party in Hong Kong, including chairman and two vice-chairman posts. Incumbent Chairman Albert Ho re-elected uncontestedly, while Sin Chung-kai and Emily Lau defeated Andrew Cheng as the two Vice-Chairmen.

== Eligibility ==
The Central Committee was elected by the party congress. All public office holders, including the members of the Legislative Council and District Councils, are eligible to vote in the party congress. Every 30 members can also elect a delegate who holds one vote in the congress.

== Overview ==
The Democratic Party formally merged with the Frontier in November 2008. The Convenor of the Frontier, Emily Lau Wai-hing contested for the Vice-Chair post with incumbent Vice-Chairman Sin Chung-kai as Albert Ho's cabinet, while Albert Ho sought for re-election for his second term. Another incumbent Vice-Chairman said he would give up his post to Emily Lau, in order to show spirit of solidarity and cooperation between the merged parties.

Reformist legislator Andrew Cheng Kar-foo decided to run for the Vice-Chairman post on 26 November, stating that he would like to lead the party with Albert Ho and Emily Lau.

== Results ==
Albert Ho was re-elected Chairman with 93% confident votes. Emily Lau and Sin Chung-kai were elected with 228 and 205 votes respectively, while Andrew Cheng got 132 votes. Cheng expected his loss to the Mainstreamers, admitting his political ideas not being accepted by the majority was the cause of the failure. 10 of the 27 Central Committee members were newcomers, 4 of them were former members of the Frontier. Only Yam Kai-bong in the Reformist faction was elected, Michael Yung Ming-chau and Kwan Wing-yip were both defeated.

Being the first Chairwoman of the party, Emily Lau said she hope to help strengthening the democratic movement, to see universal suffrage being implemented as soon as possible, and to take back party members' Home Return Permits. She also said her demand for dialogue with the central government remained unchanged.

The elected members of the 8th Central Committee are listed as following:

- Chairman: Albert Ho
- Vice-Chairpersons: Emily Lau, Sin Chung-kai
- Secretary: Cheung Yin-tung
- Treasurer: Tsui Hon-kwong
- Executive Committee Members:

- Josephine Chan Shu-ying
- Andrew Cheng Kar-foo
- Fung Wai-kwong
- Law Chi-kwong
- Lee Wing-tat
- Mok Siu-lun
- Ricky Or Yiu-lam
- Tik Chi-yuen
- Wong Sing-chi
- Yeung Sum

- Central Committee Members:

- Cheung Yuet-lan
- Chiu Chung-lam
- Joseph Chow Kam-siu
- Chui Pak-tai
- Lam Chung-hoi
- Howard Lam Tsz-kin
- Joanna Leung Suk-ching
- Mark Li Kin-yin
- Fred Li Wah-ming
- Li Wing-shing
- Stanley Ng Wing-fai
- James To Kun-sun
- Christopher Tsoi Yu-long
- Wu Chi-wai
- Yam Kai-bong
