= 1994 Democratic Party (HK) leadership election =

Democratic Party (HK) leadership election
- 2 October 1994
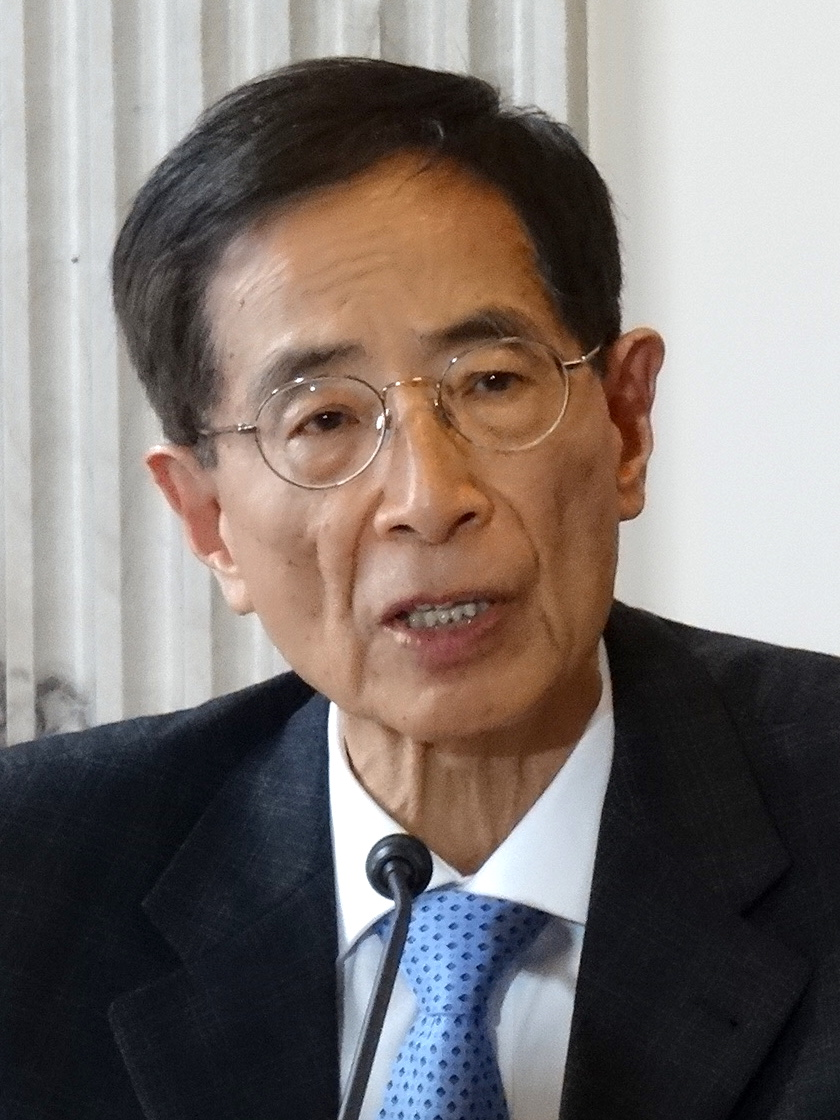
Candidate	Martin Lee
Elected Chairman
Martin Lee

The Democratic Party leadership election was held on 2 October 1994 for the 30-member 1st Central Committee of the new Democratic Party in Hong Kong, including chairman and two vice-chairman posts. It was held at the first party congress on the establishment day of the Democratic Party. Well-known popular democrat activist, Chairman of the United Democrats of Hong Kong Martin Lee became the first Chairman, while Anthony Cheung, the Chairman of the Meeting Point, and Yeung Sum became the two Vice-Chairmen.

== Central Committee ==
The 1st Central Committee was formed as following:

- Chairman: Martin Lee
- Vice-Chairmen: Anthony Cheung, Yeung Sum
- Secretary: Law Chi-kwong
- Treasurer: Andrew Fung Wai-kwong
- Executive Committee Members:

- Cheung Yuet-lan
- Cheung Man-kwong
- Cheung Yin-tung
- Fung Ho-lap
- Albert Ho Chun-yan
- Lee Chik-yuet
- Lee Wing-tat
- Fred Li Wah-ming
- Luk Shun-tim
- Szeto Wah

- Central Committee Members:

- Chan Kwok-leung
- Josephine Chan Shu-ying
- Andrew Cheng Kar-foo
- Fung Chi-wood
- Peggy Ha Ving-vung
- Hung Wing-tat
- Lai Kwok-hung
- Lam Wing-yin
- Lo Chi-kin
- Mak Hoi-wah
- Stanley Ng Wing-fai
- Sin Chung-kai
- John Tse Wing-ling
- Tsui Hon-kwong
- Yuen Bun-keung
