= 2018 Democratic Party (HK) leadership election =

Democratic Party (HK) leadership election
- 2 December 2018
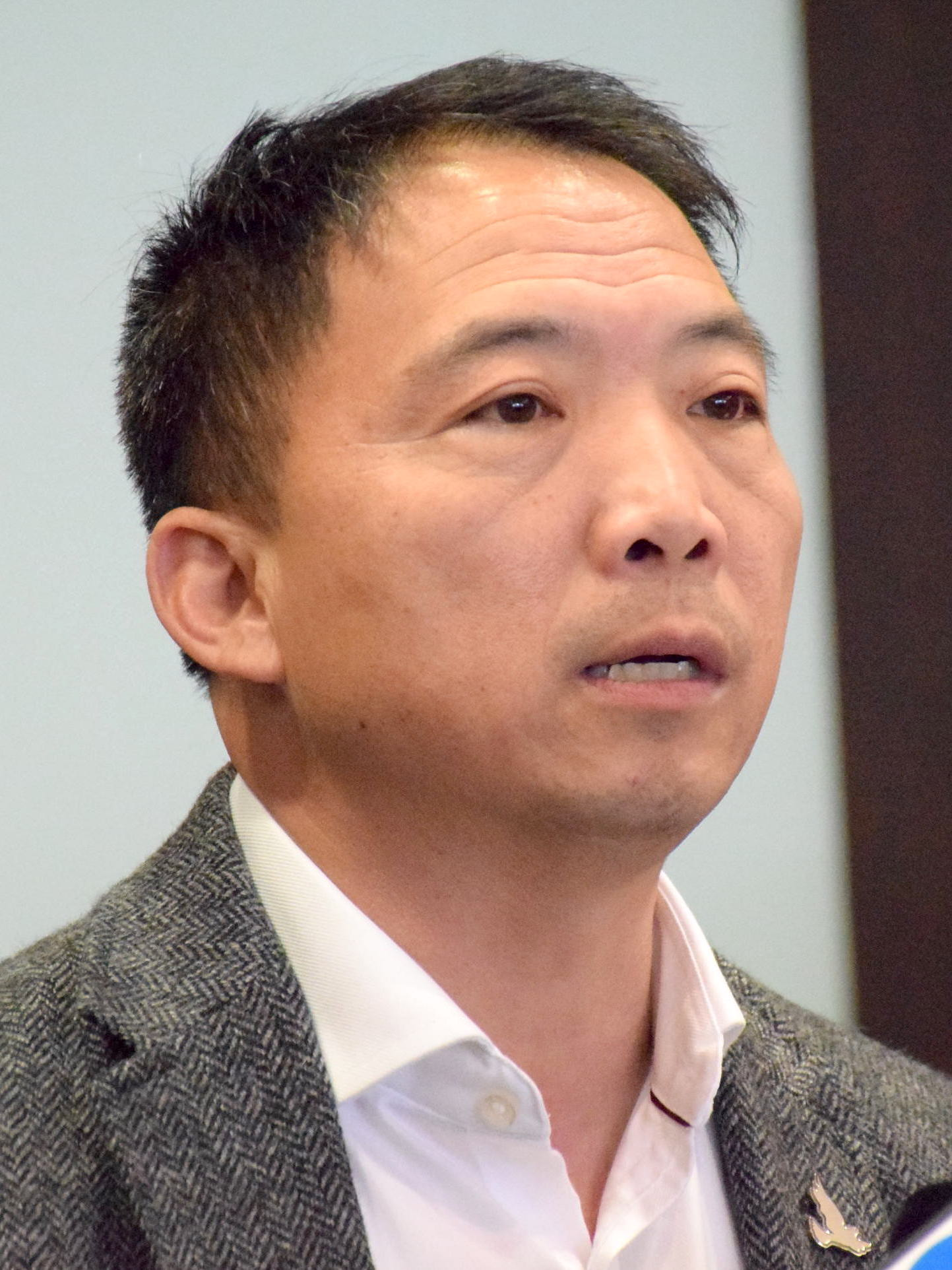
Candidate	Wu Chi-wai
Ballot	189
Percentage	77%
Chairperson before election
Wu Chi-wai
Elected Chairperson
Wu Chi-wai

The Democratic Party leadership election was held on 2 December 2018 for the 30-member 13th Central Committee of the Democratic Party in Hong Kong, including chairperson and two vice-chairperson posts.

Incumbent chairman Wu Chi-wai was re-elected uncontested with 189 confidence votes with incumbent vice-chairman Lo Kin-hei re-elected and former vice-chairman Andrew Wan retook the post from Li Wing-shing.

== Electoral method ==
The Central Committee was elected by the party congress. All public office holders, including the members of the Legislative Council and District Councils, are eligible to vote in the party congress. The eligibility of members electing a delegate who holds one vote in the congress was 5 members. Candidate also needs a majority in order to claim victory.

== Overview ==
Wu Chi-wai emphasised the average age of 42.8 year-old of the elected Central Committee, which was the youngest in history. Another highlight was former chairwoman Emily Lau running for the Disciplinary Committee, who was elected with relatively low votes of 153 votes.

== Candidates ==
=== Chairperson ===
- Wu Chi-wai, incumbent chairman of the Democratic Party, Legislative Council member for Kowloon East and Wong Tai Sin District Councillor

=== Vice-Chairpersons ===
- Lo Kin-hei, incumbent Vice-Chairman of the Democratic Party and Southern District Councillor
- Andrew Wan, former Vice-Chairman of the Democratic Party and Legislative Council member for New Territories West

== Elections ==
Chairperson election
Candidate	For	Against	% of votes
Wu Chi-wai	189	58	77

Vice-Chairperson election
Candidate	For	Against	% of votes
Lo Kin-hei	174	66	73
Andrew Wan	243	3	99

== Results ==
The elected members of the 13th Central Committee are listed as following:

- Chairman: Wu Chi-wai
- Vice-Chairmen: Lo Kin-hei, Andrew Wan
- Treasurer: Sin Chung-kai
- Secretary: Cheung Yin-tung
- Executive Committee Members:

- Chan Ying-kit
- Joseph Chow Kam-siu
- Joshua Fung Man-tao
- Leung Wing-kuen
- Mok Kin-shing
- Wong Ching-fung
- Yim Ka-wing

- Central Committee Members:

- Chai Man-hon
- Wilfred Chong Wing-fai
- Chu Tsz-lok
- Lam Cheuk-ting
- Lee Wing-tat
- Leung Yik-ting
- Bonnie Ng Hoi-yan
- Stanley Ng Wing-fai
- Shum Wan-wah
- Sin Cheuk-lam
- So Yat-hang
- Tsang Chi-ming
- Tsoi Yiu-cheong
- Tsui Hon-kwong
- Wong Pik-wan
- Wu Chi-kin
- Yuen Hoi-man
- Josephine Chan Shu-ying
