= Real brother =

Real Brother incident
- 真兄弟事件; Part of internal divisions of Democratic Party
- Date: 5 May 2006 – 18 November 2006
- Location: Hong Kong
- Caused by: Leak of internal correspondences by anonymous "Real Brother" online
- Result: Party leadership accused reformists of concealing communication with Chinese officials in a report; Reformists were defeated in the party election

Parties
Mainstreamer camp	Reformist camp

Lead figures
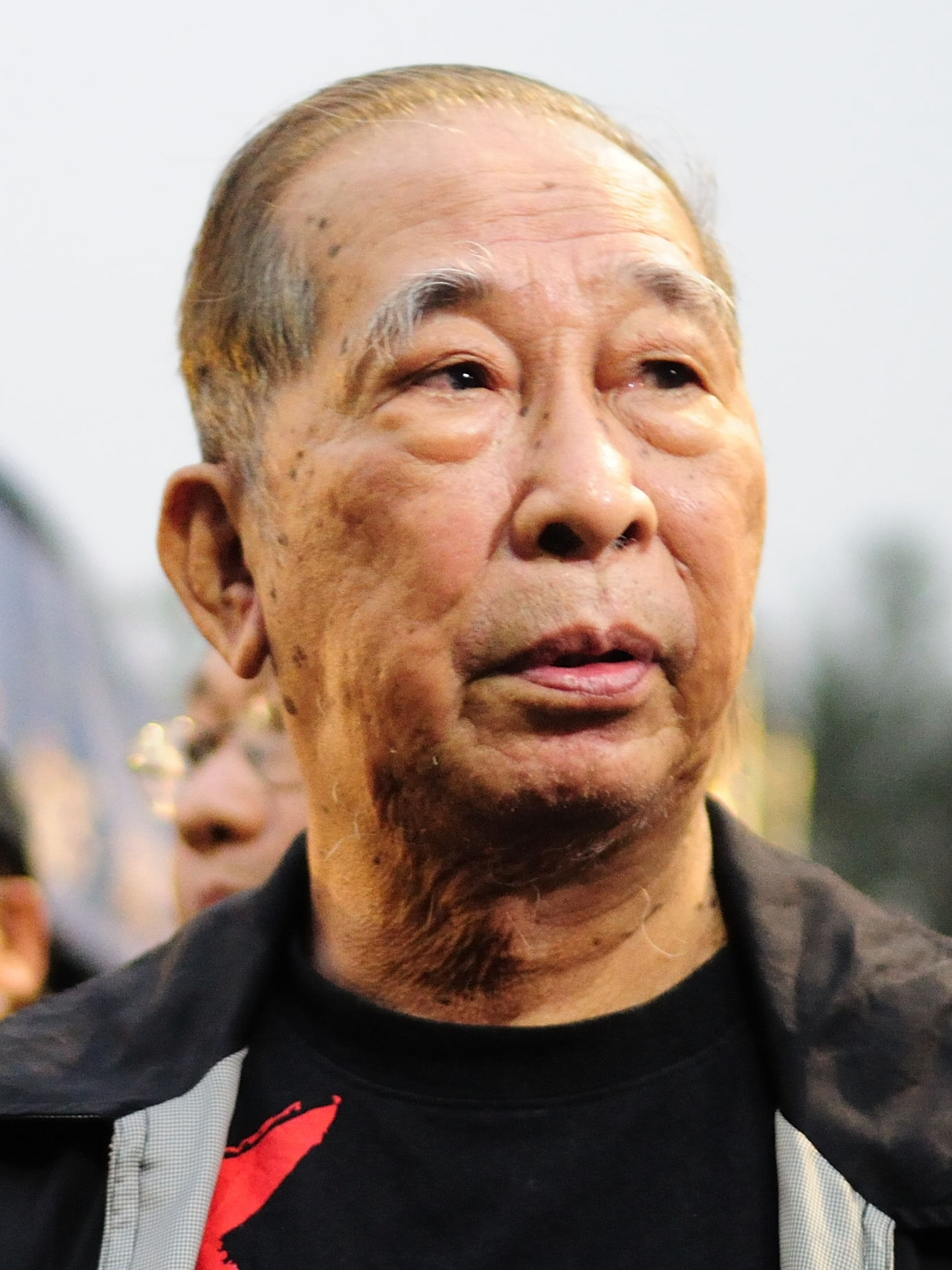
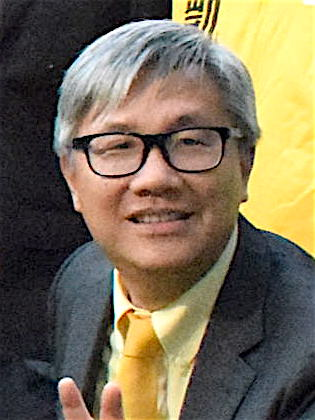
- Szeto Wah Chan King-ming

"Real brother" was a pseudonym of an anonymous online blogger who exposed divisions between the Democratic Party of Hong Kong. Dubbed one of the biggest mysteries in the political history of Hong Kong that is known in Chinese as "Real Brother incident" (Chinese: 真兄弟事件), the "real brother" began leaking correspondences of reformists, who objected to the party leadership, in November 2006 and accused them of infiltrating the party on behalf of Chinese Communist Party. The party leaders probed and concluded that the rebellious members concealed communication with "middlemen" of Chinese officials and leaked details of central committee meeting to them.

The rivalry, between the mainstream bloc, which had been leading the party since establishment, and the reformists who urged for greater transparency in decision-making, deepened following the incident. The reformists stayed until 2010 over the party leadership's act to hamper an electoral reform with Beijing officials. The identity of the "real brother" was only revealed ten years later as Howard Lam admitted he was the double spy in the party.

== Background ==
Democratic Party, then the largest group in the pan-democracy camp founded in 1994, suffered factional disputes in 1999 and 2002 over the party's ideology, causing an exodus of "young turks" and moderates. The party remained to be embroiled in bitter division as a dozen of young reformists, including Gary Fan, Raymond Luk Yiu-man, Chan King-ming, Yam Kai-bong, and Howard Lam Tsz-kin, accused the leading mainstreamers of power-grabbing. Unlike the young-turks division which advocated for labour rights, the dispute between reformists and mainstream camp focused on decision-making mechanism and power sharing as the rebels believed lawmakers should stat away from managing party's internal affairs. The rebels were secretly planning to stage a coup to oust the leaders and thereby to "democratise" the party.

Meanwhile, the party had acknowledged attempts of infiltration by officials close to the Chinese Communist Party (CCP) whom had met numerous members of the party to "create chaos". Leaders of the party were therefore concerned of opposing intra-party blocs that may be acting on behalf of the communists.

== Accusations ==
On 5 May 2006, an email, signed by "a real brother", was sent to reformists when they were watching Election 2 in a cinema. The reformists decided not to reply to what they seen as a trap. Three days later the email sender began circulating the internal correspondences of the rebels on a blog which was sent to party members, claiming his opinion was not respected by his allies. The leak was picked up by the media more than a week later. There were also emails and internal correspondences of the reformists containing criticism of the leadership and challenged their handling of the suspected infiltration. Reformists were also accused of vote-planting after a mysterious increase in members before the party leadership election.

The last post by the "real brother" in April 2007 named Luk, Chan, and Wong Chun-wai (黃俊偉) from the reformist camp as spies from the Chinese Communist Party intended to stir up internal squabbles and to portrait Democratic Party as gravely divided.

== Investigation ==
The party formed "Task Group on Members' Policy" (會員政策專責小組) with secretary-general Cheung Ying-tung as convener and Szeto Wah, the party titan, Tsui Hon-kwong (徐漢光), a confidant of Szeto Wah, Martin Lee, the ex-chair, and Chan Ka-wai (陳家偉) as members. The party suspected infiltration by Chinese authorities after two members were offered money by those officials. It had also discovered a mysterious increase in membership applications recently. Cheung said his first priority is to ascertain the validity of the e-mails' content, and will try to establish a report with information collected at interviews with party members.

The investigation ended after dozens of meetings and probes with a report released in late November 2006 following a six-hour central committee meeting. The nicknamed "Five-member Panel Report" (五人小組報告) alleged the rebelling youths, especially vice-chairman Chan King-ming, of concealing communications with Chinese figures and amount to "conducting espionage activities for the communists". The 84-page report also criticised reformist Raymond Luk Yiu-man for frequent contacting Beijing "middlemen" and providing information on party central.

Many of Luk Yiu-man's e-mails involve dissent, instigating rebellion and sowing discord. The authenticity of their content is also doubtful. He also has the intention of taking advantage of his position on the disciplinary committee to achieve his ulterior motive.

The report further accused reformist bloc of "planting votes" after there was a sudden increase of 31 applications for party membership.

However, there was no mention on who is the "real brother" after investigations. It was therefore dubbed one of the biggest mysteries of Hong Kong political parties.

While chairman Lee Wing-tat urged members to be positive when reforming party's system, including proposed formal communication channels with Chinese officials, reformists were furious and objected to publication of the report. The private emails of the reformists were included in the report, which they slammed as "immoral" and "illegal". Fan and allies dismissed the report as "without credibility and evidence" and denounced it for "character assassination" intended to suppress and clamp down on dissidents.

== Aftermath ==
Cheung Ying-tung acknowledged the incident dealt a further blow to the image of the Democratic Party. Political commentator Ma Ngok said the fundamental problem is "a general unease over the party's decline since the handover".

=== Reformists' future ===
Reformists were not evicted from the party despite the probe. There were also no plans for disciplinary action as no member filed complaint to the disciplinary committee. Chan and Luk, both named in the report, stressed they would not quit the party.

The Democratic Party also allowed reformists to hold their stronghold, the New Territories East branch, days after the report was published, with Chan King-ming staying as branch head by a big margin after a major mainstreamer threw his support to Chan. Albert Ho, who ran to succeed Lee as party chair, also attended a party discussion initiated by the reformists. Ho, who was seen as the most acceptable to the rebels, also teamed up with two moderates for leadership poll in a sign of goodwill. He was later elected after easily overcoming reformist's candidates and ousted reformist vice-chair Chan King-ming.

Reformists left the party in 2010 after dissenting their superiors for negotiating the electoral reform package with Chinese officials. They subsequently formed Neo Democrats and competed with their old party.

=== Lam's acknowledgment ===
In 2016, Howard Lam, who was also the youngest inaugural member of the Democratic Party, acknowledged to Stand News that he was the "real brother" as a secret agent of Szeto. He, however, claimed the blogs online were written by Tsui, although Tsui denied that he was the real brother.

Recalling his close relationship with Szeto Wah, Lam said he joined the reformists in 2005 and leaked the reformists' plan to the mainstreamers. Szeto suspected the youths were infiltrated by CCP and decided to send Lam as a spy. The plan was agreed by another mainstreamer Albert Ho and then-chairman Lee Wing-tat. Soon after, the reformists also decided to have Lam act as a secret agent to try gaining the trust from Szeto Wah. Lam therefore attacked Fan's reform as "ambitious plan of a political struggle" during a press interview in January 2006, as part of the plan.

Lam said he was accused by both the reformists for revealing the secrets to mainstreamers, whom at the same time criticised Lam for colluding with the rebels. Ho, then as chairman, eventually clarified in an internal party congress in 2014 that Lam was not part of the plot. Lam said he decided to let everything out due to his illness.
