= 2020 Democratic Party (HK) leadership election =

Democratic Party (HK) leadership election
- 6 December 2020
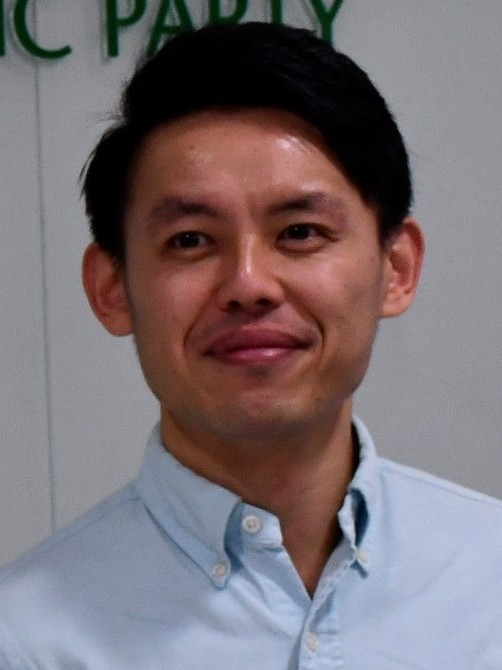
Candidate	Lo Kin-hei
Ballot	231
Chairperson before election
Wu Chi-wai
Elected Chairperson
Lo Kin-hei

The Democratic Party leadership election was held on 6 December 2020 for the 14th Central Committee of the Democratic Party in Hong Kong, including chairperson and two vice-chairperson posts.

Incumbent vice-chairman Lo Kin-hei was elected as chairman uncontested with 231 confidence votes, while former member of Legislative Council Lam Cheuk-ting and Kwun Tong District Councillor Edith Leung beat Shatin District Councillor Sin Cheuk-nam to become new vice-chairpersons.

== Electoral method ==
The Central Committee was elected by the party congress. All public office holders, including the members of the Legislative Council and District Councils, are eligible to vote in the party congress. The eligibility of members electing a delegate who holds one vote in the congress was 5 members. Candidate also needs a majority in order to claim victory.

== Overview ==
Lo Kin-hei, the incumbent vice-chairman of the party, was the only candidate for chairmanship election. Without other contestants, Lo was elected with an overwhelming of 231 votes, showing the party was highly confident with the new chairman. Lo also became the youngest party chairperson and the first without prior experience in the Legislative Council.

Election for vice-chairpersons was comparatively fierce with three candidates thriving for two seats. The three candidates were: Edith Leung from the young Turks faction of the party; Lam Cheuk-ting, who just resigned from the Legislative Council; Sin Cheuk-nam, seen as Lam's apprentice.

The average age for new Central Committee is also lower. Around 10 candidates among the 27 were running for the committee for the first time. Senior party figures including ex-chairman Lee Wing-tat and former Legislative Council member Helena Wong were not on the candidate list.

== Candidates ==
=== Chairperson ===
- Lo Kin-hei, incumbent vice-chairman of the Democratic Party, member of the Southern District Council

=== Vice-Chairpersons ===
- Lam Cheuk-ting, former member of the Legislative Council, member of the North District Council
- Edith Leung, member of the Kwun Tong District Council
- Sin Cheuk-nam, member of the Sha Tin District Council

== Elections ==
Results are as follows according to media reports:

Chairperson election
Candidate	For
Lo Kin-hei	231

Vice-chairperson election
Candidate	For
Lam Cheuk-ting	170
Edith Leung	140
Sin Cheuk-nam	109

== Results ==
The elected members of the 14th Central Committee are listed as following:

- Chairman: Lo Kin-hei
- Vice-chairmen: Lam Cheuk-ting, Edith Leung
- Treasurer: Sin Chung-kai
- Secretary: Shum Wan-wa
- Central Committee Members:

- Chan Po-ming
- Chan Yuk-ming
- Cheng Keng-ieong
- Chong Wing-fai
- Chow Cheuk-ki
- Chow Kam-siu
- Chow Wing-heng
- Hon Chun-yin
- Lai Kwong-wai
- Lai Chun-Wing
- Lau Chi-kit
- Leung Wing-kuen
- Mok Kin-shing
- Bonnie Ng
- Stanley Ng
- Shum Wan-wa
- Sin Chung-kai
- Tsang Tsz-ming
- Andrew Wan
- Wu Chi-wai
- Sin Cheuk-nam
