= Siu Hong =

Siu Hong may refer to:

== Places ==
- Siu Hong (constituency), a constituency in Tuen Mun District
- Siu Hong Court, a public housing estate in Tuen Mun, Hong Kong
- Siu Hong station, an MTR rapid transit station adjacent to the estate
- Siu Hong stop, an MTR Light Rail stop adjacent to the estate

== People ==
- Wu Siu Hong (born 1984), ten-pin bowling player from Hong Kong
