= 1998 Democratic Party (HK) leadership election =

Democratic Party (HK) leadership election
- 13 December 1998
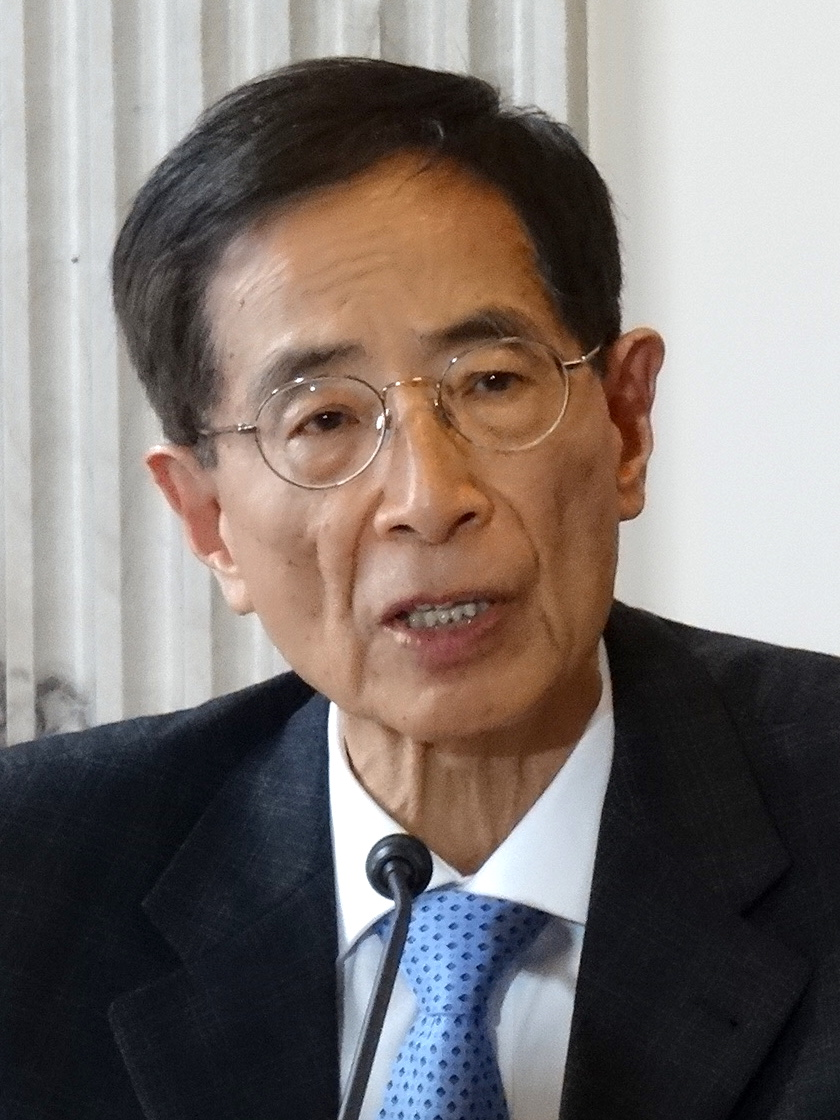
| Candidate | Martin Lee |
Chairman before election
Martin Lee
Elected Chairman
Martin Lee

The Democratic Party leadership election was held on 13 December 1998 for the 30-member 3rd Central Committee of the Democratic Party in Hong Kong, including chairman and two vice-chairman posts. Founding Chairman Martin Lee Chu-ming was re-elected uncontestedly for the third consecutive term. The election was marked by a "coup d'etat" by the Young Turks faction whose candidate Lau Chin-shek defeated the incumbent Vice-Chairman Anthony Cheung Bing-leung. The intra-party factional struggles intensified as a result.

== Eligibility ==
The Central Committee was elected by the party congress. All public office holders, including the members of the Legislative Council, Urban Council, Regional Council and District Councils, are eligible to vote in the party congress. Every 30 members can also elect a delegate who holds one vote in the congress.

== Overview ==
By late 1998 there was enough dissatisfaction against the party's central authorities, especially against the monopoly of power position by the coalition of party leaders and former Meeting Point members, giving the "dissents" sufficient support in the party congress to challenge the party leadership.

The Young Turks, mainly the district-level members with the more radical-minded and grassroots interests had very diverse goals. They disliked the Meeting Point faction's more compromising stand towards the Communist government, and their pro-middle-class and pro-laissez-faire positions. Some of them wanted to push the party towards a more pro-grassroots position with street actions.

A gran coalition consisting mostly of the member-representatives and District Councillors. They formed their own list of about ten candidates to run for the Central Committee and nominated trade unionist Lau Chin-shek to run for Vice-Chairman against the former Meeting Point Chairman and the incumbent Vice-Chairman Anthony Cheung. Some hoped to make Lau as their factional leader, to lead the party to a more pro-grassroots position.

At the last moment, Lau backed down because his candidacy was opposed by the Hong Kong Confederation of Trade Unions (CTU) which Lau was the Chairman. The CTU saw that the CTU would be subservient to the Democratic Party if its Chairman was the Vice-Chairman of the party. They demanded Lau to choose between the Democrat Vice-Chairmanship and the CTU Chairmanship. Lau eventually resigned as the CTU Chairman.

== Results ==
Martin Lee was re-elected uncontestedly Chairman for the third consecutive term, while Lau Chin-shek supported by Young Turks' ousted the former Meeting Point's Anthony Cheung. The Young Turks, however managed to elect about 10 members to the Central Committee, at the expense of some Meeting Point members. Although Lau was elected Vice-Chairman, he resigned after the election. The defeated Vice-Chairman Cheung also resigned from the Central Committee as a result.

The event had profound effects on factionalism within the Democratic Party. It raised the banner of the Young Turks both within the party and in the media. The party leaders, so called the "Mainstreamers", including the "triumvirate", Yeung Sum, Cheung Man-kwong and Lee Wing-tat who did not sense there was a coup until the last days, were alarmed. In the debate on the Minimum Wage legislation in the following year, the Mainstreamers were much organised and defeated the Young Turks' motion. The intensifying factional rivalries also hurt the party's image in the public.

== Bibliography ==
- Kuan, Hsin-chi; Liu, Zhaojia; Wang, Jiaying, eds. (2002). Out of the Shadow of 1997?: The 2000 Legislative Council Election in the Hong Kong Special Administrative Region. Chinese University Press. ISBN 9629960303.
