= Third Side =

- Chairman: Tik Chi-yuen
- Vice-Chairmen: Casper Wong; Timothy Chui
- Director General: Chan Ka-wai
- Deputy General: Marie Pang
- Founded: 3 January 2016; 10 years ago
- Headquarters: 11/F, Wo Foo Commercial Building, 574 Nathan Road, Yau Ma Tei, Kowloon, Hong Kong
- Membership (2016): ▼68
- Ideology: Liberalism (HK); Centrism (HK)
- Colours: Dark green
- Executive Council: 0 / 33
- Legislative Council: 0 / 90
- District Councils: 0 / 470

Website
- thirdside.org.hk

Third Side
- Traditional Chinese: 新思維
- Simplified Chinese: 新思维
- Literal meaning: new thinking
Transcriptions
Standard Mandarin
- Hanyu Pinyin: Xīn Sīwéi
Yue: Cantonese
- Yale Romanization: Sān Sīwàih
- Jyutping: San^{1} Si^{1}wai^{4}

Third Side (Chinese: 新思維; lit. 'new thinking') is a political party in Hong Kong which claims to offer a "third road" to democracy, positioned between the pro-democracy camp and the pro-Beijing camp. It is led by Tik Chi-yuen, who was a co-founder and longtime member of the Democratic Party until his expulsion in 2015 for promoting political reforms proposed by the Chinese central government.

== History ==
Third Side is led by chairman Tik Chi-yuen, the former vice-chairman of the Democratic Party, and vice-convenor Wong Sing-chi, a former Democrat legislator. Wong was expelled by the Democrats in July 2015 for urging legislators to accept the Beijing-decreed political reform package. Tik subsequently quit in September, citing differences on the pursuit of democracy.

The party's 20-member preparatory committee included former Democrats Chan Ka-wai and Chow Yick-hay, and Centaline Property Agency co-founder Shih Wing-ching, who was also from Path of Democracy, the think tank set up by fellow moderate and former Civic Party legislator Ronny Tong Ka-wah. Others included Hung Fook Tong executive director Ricky Szeto Wing-fu and Shue Yan University associate professor Lee Shu-kam. The party was inaugurated at a 7 January ceremony.

Wong Sing-chi was a candidate in the legislative by-election in early 2016, but lost the race by coming in fifth place.

After the by-election, the party once considered filling candidates in the 2016 legislative election. And yet, on 22 July 2016, ten members of the Third Side quit which included two vice-chairmen Marcus Liu Tim-shing and Ben Kuen Ping-yiu, who were all part of the team that was going to run in the New Territories East constituency. They stated that the party had fallen short of their expectation to forge a new brand of politics perched between the two traditional blocs. The party argued that their departure was due to the party's decision not to field any candidates in New Territories East in the upcoming election. The party failed to win any seat in the election.

On 19 December 2017, Macau denied entry to Third Side member Wong Chun-long for security reasons despite inviting him to attend a conference on Macau's finance and information technology sectors.

In December 2021, it was reported that Wong Chun-long, Third Side candidate in the New Territories North West constituency in that month's LegCo election, had posed as a young girl on online discussion forum LIHKG. Wong started a political debate under the name "Little Sister" while claiming to be part of the "yellow" (pro-democracy) camp.

For the 2025 legislative election, Third Side planned on running a few candidates with the goal of winning two seats in Geographic Constituencies and one in a Functional Constituency. Tik did not stand for re-election. However, they were not able to field any candidates due to difficulties procuring required endorsements from each sector of the Election Committee. It is possible this was the result of moderates being viewed as "no longer needed in a patriotic administration" by government officials.

== Stances ==
In initial stage, Third Side was considered as a "middle-of-the-road" political group between the pro-democracy camp and pro-Beijing camp. and had a direct competition with pro-democracy Alvin Yeung and pro-Beijing Holden Chow in the 2016 New Territories East by-election. However, during 2016 Hong Kong legislative election, it was reported that pro-Beijing camp once considered allocating votes to Tik Chi-yuen, who was running in the election in the Kowloon West constituency in the hope of defeating pro-democracy and localist candidates.

In the November 2018 Kowloon West by-election, Tik endorsed pro-Beijing candidate Chan Hoi-yan together with other pro-Beijing politicians.

Third Side was considered the sole non-establishment party in the 7th Legislative Council (LegCo) following the 2021 legislative election, in which Tik was elected to the Social Welfare constituency. Tik did not join the other 89 LegCo member-elects in calling for an investigation into the pro-democracy media outlet Stand News after police raided its offices on 29 December 2021. However, on 16 February 2022, Tik, along with the other 89 members of the LegCo, made a statement of gratitude to Chinese Communist Party general secretary Xi Jinping for his "guidance" in fighting the COVID-19 pandemic in Hong Kong.

== Election results ==
=== Legislative council elections ===
Election	Number of popular votes	% of popular votes	GC seats	FC seats	EC seats	Total seats	+/−	Position
2016 (By-election)	17,295	4.00%	0	0		0 / 1	Steady	
2016	▼13,461	▼0.62	0	0		0 / 70	Steady	
2021	▼4,066	▼0.31	0	1	0	1 / 90	▲1	9th
2025	Unable to qualify		—N/a	—N/a	—N/a	0 / 90	▼1	—N/a

=== District Council elections ===
Election	Number of popular votes	% of popular votes	Total elected seats	+/−
2015	2,011	0.14	0 / 431	0

== See also ==
- Path of Democracy
- Democratic Party (Hong Kong)
- Professional Power
- Synergy of Macao
