= Siu Hong (constituency) =

Hong Kong constituency

- 兆康
- Elected constituency for the Tuen Mun District Council
- Boundary of Siu Hong in Tuen Mun District
- District: Tuen Mun
- Legislative Council constituency: New Territories North West
- Population: 15,943 (2019)
- Electorate: 8,897 (2019)

Current constituency
- Created: 1991
- Number of members: One
- Member: Vacant

Siu Hong (Chinese: 兆康) is one of the 31 constituencies in the Tuen Mun District.

Created for the 1991 District Board elections, the constituency returns one district councillor to the Tuen Mun District Council, with an election every four years.

Siu Hong loosely covers areas surrounding Siu Hong Court in Tuen Mun with an estimated population of 15,943.

== Councillors represented ==
Election	Member	Party
1991	Wan Sui-ling	Nonpartisan
1994	Josephine Chan Shu-ying	Democratic
2015	Mo Shing-fung	DAB
2019	Josephine Chan Shu-ying→Vacant	Democratic

== Election results ==
=== 2010s ===
Tuen Mun District Council Election, 2019: Siu Hong
Party	Candidate	Votes	%	±%
Democratic	Josephine Chan Shu-ying	3,784	56.88	
DAB	Mo Shing-fung	2,939	43.12	
Majority		845	13.76	
Turnout		6,757	75.96	
Democratic hold		Swing		
