= Democratic Party (Hong Kong) =

Political party in Hong Kong, 1994–2025

Democratic Party 民主黨
- Abbreviation: DP
- Chairperson: Lo Kin-hei (final)
- Founded: 2 October 1994
- Dissolved: 14 December 2025
- Merger of: United Democrats; Meeting Point; The Frontier
- Headquarters: 4/F, Hanley House, 776–778 Nathan Road, Kowloon, Hong Kong
- Youth wing: Young Democrats
- Membership (2025): c. 400
- Ideology: Liberalism (HK); Liberal democracy
- Political position: Centre to centre-left
- Regional affiliation: Pro-democracy camp
- Colours: Green
- Slogan: Giving It All

Website
- dphk.org
- Politics of Hong Kong; Political parties; Elections; A: Majority merged into the Democratic Party on 23 November 2008; B: The party is considered by different scholars as big tent, centre, centre-left or left-wing. See Factions and ideology for more.

Democratic Party
- Traditional Chinese: 民主黨
- Simplified Chinese: 民主党
Transcriptions
Standard Mandarin
- Hanyu Pinyin: Mínzhǔ Dǎng
- Bopomofo: ㄇㄧㄣˊ ㄓㄨˇ ㄉㄤˇ
- Wade–Giles: Min^{2}-chu^{3} Tang^{3}
- Tongyong Pinyin: Mín-jhǔ Dǎng
- IPA: [mǐn.ʈʂù tàŋ]
Yue: Cantonese
- Yale Romanization: Màhnjyú Dóng
- Jyutping: man4 zyu2 dong2
- IPA: [mɐn˩ tsy˧˥ tɔŋ˧˥]

The Democratic Party (DP) was a liberal political party in Hong Kong. Once the flagship party of the pro-democracy camp, it was Hong Kong's main opposition party for decades before dissolving in December 2025 after it was unable to enter elections due to the 2021 Hong Kong electoral changes.

The party was established in 1994 in a merger of the United Democrats of Hong Kong and Meeting Point in preparation for the 1995 Legislative Council election. The party won a landslide victory, received over 40 percent of the popular vote and became the largest party in the legislature in the final years of the British colonial era. It opposed the bloody crackdown on the Tiananmen protests of 1989 and called for the end of one-party rule of the Chinese Communist Party (CCP); the party was long seen as hostile to the Beijing authorities.

Led by Martin Lee, the Democratic Party boycotted the Provisional Legislative Council on the eve of the Hong Kong handover in 1997 in protest to Beijing's decision to dismantle the agreed transition, but reemerged as the largest party in the first SAR Legislative Council election of 1998. Due to the Beijing-installed proportional representation voting system, the Democrats embattled in bitter factional conflicts in the early post-handover era. Although the party's popularity briefly rebounded after the 2003 pro-democracy demonstration, its dominance was gradually eclipsed by the emergence of the new parties.

As a response to the electoral gains of the Civic Party and the League of Social Democrats, the Democratic Party merged with Emily Lau's The Frontier in 2008. The party made a surprising move by negotiating with the Beijing officials over the constitutional reform package in 2010. It resulted in a catastrophic split within the pro-democracy camp. Being ferociously attacked by the radical democrats, the party sharply lost support in the 2012 Legislative Council election, retaining only six seats. Afterwards, the Democrats underwent a rejuvenation process in which most veterans retired and made way for the new generation in the 2016 election.

Following the widespread protests in 2019, the party won a landslide victory in the local elections. After the imposition of the Hong Kong national security law in July 2020 and subsequent disqualifications of four pro-democracy camp legislators, all legislators of the party, along with others from the camp, resigned in protest. This left the party with no representation for the first time since 1998. In January 2021, leading party members were arrested under the security law. A majority of its district councillors resigned in July 2021 after reports of possible disqualification for not upholding the Basic Law. The party did not run in any elections thereafter, which were limited to government-approved "patriots" only. Despite keeping a low profile in the subsequent years, the party reportedly faced pressure from Beijing and disbanded in December 2025.

== Party beliefs ==
The constitution of the party made clear that the party supported "the return of the sovereignty of Hong Kong to China" and "to promote and facilitate the implementation of the principles of 'one country, two system[s]'". It has consistently stressed the "two systems" part as Beijing pressed for precedence of "one country", raising concerns of eroding Hong Kong's autonomy. The party's stance on Hong Kong's future development differs from that of pro-Beijing parties. It believes a democratic government and high degree of autonomy will "help to contribute to the stability and prosperity of Hong Kong, and foster the development of China".

The party's position on social or cultural issues was not well-defined but verged on the moderate, partly due to some support from centrist and Catholic supporters. In a way that may seem contradictory to traditional liberal ideology, the party generally opposed the legalisation of commercial sex or gambling operations. There was no official stance on same-sex marriage due to disagreements in the party, but the Democratic Party support enacting laws which would prohibit discrimination against the LGBT community.

In later years with the emergence of the pro-Hong Kong independence tide, the Democratic Party was criticised by pro-independence voices for its perceived pro-China position. However the party had also been accused for years by pro-Beijing media of being anti-China, as many of the party leaders including Szeto Wah, Martin Lee and Albert Ho are self-proclaimed patriots who oppose only the one-party rule of the Chinese Communist Party but not the country in general and support the Chinese democracy movement. The party had also stated that it does not support Hong Kong being separated from China.

== History ==
The Party's first logo used in 1994–2003.

The Democratic Party was founded with the merger of the two major pro-democracy parties at the time, the United Democrats of Hong Kong (UDHK) and the Meeting Point (MP). The Meeting Point was formed in 1983 by a group of liberal intellectuals and people from middle class in the background of the Sino-British negotiations on the sovereignty of Hong Kong after 1997. The group favoured the transfer of sovereignty over Hong Kong to the People's Republic of China but called for a "free, democratic and autonomous Hong Kong government under Chinese sovereignty". Together with the Association for Democracy and People's Livelihood (ADPL) and the Hong Kong Affairs Society (HKAS), they were the three major pro-democracy organisations actively participated in the local and municipal elections in the 1980s.

The like-minded liberals also formed the Joint Committee on the Promotion of Democratic Government (JCPDG) and the Group of 190 to strive for the 1988 Legislative Council election and the faster democratisation the political structure towards 1997 and after 1997 during the drafting of the Hong Kong Basic Law, under the leadership of liberal drafters Martin Lee and Szeto Wah. During the Tiananmen Square protests of 1989, the liberals stood firmly with the student protestors, formed the Hong Kong Alliance in Support of Patriotic Democratic Movements in China (HKASPDMC) and condemned the bloody suppression on 4 June.

In preparation for the first Legislative Council direct election in 1991, members of the three political groups and many liberal activists of the JCPDG joined together and formed the United Democrats of Hong Kong in April 1990. Chaired by the Martin Lee, the United Democrats of Hong Kong formed an alliance with Anthony Cheung Bing-leung's Meeting Point in the campaign. The liberal alliance won a landslide victory in the direct election, receiving over 52% of the vote and winning 14 of the 16 geographical constituency seats in September. The popularity of the pro-democratic alliance was principally rose from its position towards the Tiananmen Square protests and the widespread fear towards the Beijing government afterwards.

The United Democrats stood a firm anti-Beijing stances, criticising the Tiananmen crackdown and also the democratic situation. As a result, Lee and Szeto were deprived their posts in the Basic Law Drafting Committee and were accused of "treason". The United Democrats supported the last governor Chris Patten's democratic reform proposal, which allowed a much extended electorate for the first fully elected Legislative Council election in 1995 and was ferociously opposed by Beijing.

=== Founding ===
The United Democrats of Hong Kong and the Meeting Point further united by announcing the formation of the Democratic Party on 18 April 1994. They formally merged into the Democratic Party on 2 October 1994, in eve of the three-tier elections in 1994 and 1995. Martin Lee became the first Chairman of the party and Anthony Cheung and Yeung Sum became the Vice-Chairmen, elected on the first general meeting on the establishment day. The ADPL continued to keep its own identity, arguing that it represented grassroots' interest whereas the Democratic Party was more focused on the "middle class".

The founding manifesto of the Democratic Party said it would seek to further unite democratic forces, strive for a high degree of autonomy and an open, democratic government, and would promote welfare and equality in Hong Kong. The party also tried to appropriate the discourse of nationalism as it stated "We care for China and, as part of the Chinese citizenry, we have the rights and obligations to participate in and comment on the affairs of China." It also called for the condemnation of the 1989 Tiananmen Incident as well as an amendment of the Hong Kong Basic Law before 1997 to allow full election of the Chief Executive and the Legislative Council of Hong Kong.

=== Late colonial period (1994–1998) ===
The electorate base of the 1995 LegCo election was largely extended by the Governor Chris Patten's controversial electoral reform package supported by the pro-democrats. Facing the challenge from the newly formed business conservative Liberal Party and pro-Beijing loyalist Democratic Alliance for the Betterment of Hong Kong (DAB), the Democratic Party was able to win handsome victories in the three-tier elections in 1994 and 1995. In the LegCo election in September 1995, the party secured 42% of the vote and 19 of the 60 total seats, emerging as the largest party in the Legislative Council, compared to Liberal Party's 10 seats and DAB's 6 seats. Together with the ADPL and other pro-democracy independents, the democratic coalition was able to garner one- or two-vote majorities on certain anti-government issues during the last term of the legislature. After Patten's reform package was passed, Beijing decided that the legislature elected in 1995 could not ride the "through train" beyond the handover of Hong Kong, as the first legislature of the Hong Kong Special Administrative Region (SAR). Instead, Beijing set up a highly controlled Provisional Legislative Council (PLC) in December 1996. The Democratic Party refused to join the Selection Committee as it opposed to Beijing's decision "to scrap Hong Kong's elected legislature and replace it with a hand-picked version." The party thus lost all the seats until the PLC was replaced by the first Legislative Council of the Hong Kong SAR in 1998.

At the midnight on 30 June just after the handover ceremony, the Democratic Party LegCo members protested against the abrupt termination of their tenure and call for the establishment of democratic government at the balcony of the Legislative Council Building, and vow to return to the legislature by means of election in 1998.

=== Early divisions (1998–2002) ===
Decided by the Provisional Legislative Council, the first-past-the-post voting system was replaced by the proportional representation system in the first LegCo election in 1998. The proportional representation gave an advantage to the weaker pro-Beijing DAB as it did not require a majority to win a seat. Thus in 1995 the Democratic Party won 12 seats in the geographical constituencies with 42.3% of the vote, but it got only 9 seat with 40.2% of the vote in 1998.

After the handover, the Right of Abode litigation was initiated immediately and reached its climax in the Court of Final Appeal's (CFA) decisions favouring the right of abode seekers in Ng Ka Ling and Chan Kam Nga lawsuits in January 1999. The Democratic Party supported the right of abode seekers and opposed strongly to the government's decision to refer the National People's Congress Standing Committee (NPCSC) to interpret the Basic Law. Party chairman Martin Lee condemned this move as "a dagger striking at the heart of the rule of law" and in symbolic protest walked out of the Legislative Council with 18 other members, all dressed in black. However, the party appeared to suffer from popular discontent with the party's position. The party was also criticised for failing to broaden its post-1997 agenda and develop a well-defined social base.

The party also appeared to suffer from the internal dissension. In December 1998, the "Young Turks" led by Andrew To staged a successful coup d'état in the party leadership election, which promptly brought the party into a phase of factional struggle. The Young Turks formed their own list of about ten candidates to run for the Central Committee and nominated Lau Chin-shek to run for vice-chairman against the former Meeting Point chairman Anthony Cheung. Some hoped to make Lau as their factional leader, to lead the party from the Meeting Point faction's pro-middle class, pro-laissez-faire and pro-Beijing positions to a more pro-grassroots and confrontational position. Although Lau was elected vice-chairman, he resigned after the election. Lau was subsequently forced to leave the party in June 2000 after a one-year membership freeze, due to Lau's Democratic Party/Frontier dual membership.

In a general meeting in September 1999, the Young Turks also proposed to put the minimum wage legislation on the 2000 LegCo election platform of the party. The Mainstreamers which included the "triumvirate", Yeung Sum, Cheung Man-kwong and Lee Wing-tat, saw the minimum wage debate was a challenge to the party authority and decide to fight back by joining hands with the Meeting Point faction to defeat the Young Turks. Andrew To wrote a newspaper article accusing the Mainstreamers of suppressing intra-party dissent, "just like the butchers in the Tiananmen massacre." To's comment led to a backlash of opinion within the party and led to the defeat of the minimum wage motion. The debate, largely took place in the mass media, publicised the factional rivalries and created a bad image within the party.

The popular discontent and internal fragmentation appeared to have marked a turning point in the prospects of the Democratic Party and the DAB. In the 1999 District Council elections, the DAB more than doubled its representation, while Democratic Party performed less well than anticipated, winning 86 seats. In the second LegCo election in the following year, Tsang Kin-shing and Steve Chan Kwok-leung left the party and ran as independents after failing to be nominated on the candidates list by the Central Committee.

In December 2002, Yeung Sum succeeded Martin Lee as Party chairman in the leadership change, legislator Albert Chan, belonging to the pro-grassroots relatively "radical" faction, left the party. By the end of 2002, more than 50 members of the party which had already formed a political group, Social Democratic Forum, defected to the Frontier, mostly Young Turks.

=== Rebound in popularity (2002–2004) ===
In 2002 and 2003 the party saw a rebound in popularity, largely due to the low popularity of the Tung Chee-hwa's administration, and more significantly the controversy over the Basic Law Article 23 legislation. The pro-democrats worried that the anti-subversion law would threaten the rights and freedom of the Hong Kong people and damaged the rule of law and "One Country, Two Systems." The Article 23 legislation turned into a territory-wide debate and led to a re-awakening of civil society, mobilising different sectors to join the opposition movement. The Democratic Party used many of their 94 district offices for community-level mobilisation. In the weeks before the 1 July march, the Democratic Party managed to collect phone numbers of about 40,000 supporters. The party's volunteers and staff called them one by one to call on them to join the demonstration. The demonstration resulted in a record-breaking number of people, more than 500,000 Hong Kong people joined the march. The SAR government eventually shelved the bill indefinitely after losing support from allied Liberal Party.

In the following 2003 District Council elections in November, the pro-democracy camp turned the popular support into the demand of democratisation, universal suffrage of the Chief Executive and Legislative Council in 2007 and 2008, their primary goals for years. The Democratic Party received a great victory by claiming 95 seats out of the 120 candidates in the election.

The civil movement in 2003 also broadened the spectrum of the pro-democracy camp. A number of pro-democracy groups such as Article 45 Concern Group and individuals such as Leung Kwok-hung and Albert Cheng were elected in the 2004 LegCo election. Although the pan-democracy camp took 25 of 60 seats, the Democratic Party won only 9 seats, falling from the largest party in the Legislative Council to the third, behind DAB's 13 (including the FTU members) and pro-business Liberal Party's 10. Worried by pre-election surveys indicating that Martin Lee might be in danger, the Democratic Party sent out a last minute S.O.S. call to "save Martin Lee" who was listed second on the Democratic Party's list behind chairman Yeung Sum in the Hong Kong Island constituency. As a result, Yeung's and Lee's list absorbed too many votes at the expense of pro-democracy ally Cyd Ho losing by just 815 votes to DAB's Choy So-yuk. It caused some dissatisfaction among some supporters of the party and the camp generally. Yeung Sum announced he would not seek for re-election as chairman after the election as a result and subsequently replaced by Lee Wing-tat in the party leadership election in December.

=== Young Turks out and Frontier in (2004–2008) ===
Although lack of breakthrough in the legislative elections, the pan-democracy maintains its basic position of seeking universal suffrage in 2007 and 2008 for Chief Executive and Legislative Council respectively, even though the NPCSC's interpretation of the Basic Law in April 2004 rejected the demand. After Tung Chee-hwa's resigned as Chief Executive in March 2005, Party chairman Lee Wing-tat attempted to run for the post against Donald Tsang but failed to get enough nominations in the Election Committee. Donald Tsang was elected uncontestedly in the Chief Executive election.

In October 2005, Donald Tsang's administration issued a blueprint for the electoral reform. The proposal aimed to double to size of Election Committee to 1,600 and add 10 seats to the Legislative Council, half of which would be directly elected and the rest returned by District Councillors. The pro-democracy parties criticised the proposal as conservative as it did not move towards to universal suffrage. In December, the camp held a mass rally against the government's reform package and demanded a timetable and road-map to democracy be attached to the proposal. The reform package was at last vetoed by the pan-democracy camp. In December 2006, 114 of the 137 pro-democracy candidates filled by the Democratic Party and the newly established Civic Party won the Election Committee subsector elections which secured the threshold of 100 nominations to enter the next Chief Executive election.

Dozens of members quit the party between 2005 and 2006, including district councillor Stephen Fong Chun-bong (who was forced out by the party due to sex scandal). In March 2006, the Mainstreamer faction alleged that some senior members were involved in spying activities of China. The "suspects" were all Young Turks Reformist members including vice-chairman Chan King-ming and Gary Fan which was known as "Real Brother incident". The Young Turk members were all ousted in the following leadership election in December, with Mainstreamer Albert Ho defeating Chan King-ming as the new party chairman.

The democrats suffered a humiliating defeat in the District Council elections in November 2007. The Democratic Party took the heaviest loss of 36 seats as compared with 2003. 23 of the party's incumbent Councillors were ousted, with just over half of its candidates elected.

In the 2008 LegCo election, the Democratic Party's share of vote further dropped to 20.6%, winning only 8 seats. The emerging pro-democratic parties professionals-formed Civic Party and left-wing League of Social Democrats (LSD) took the share of 13.7% and 10.1% and won 5 and 3 seats respectively. Facing the emerging new parties, the two old political parties the Democratic Party and the Frontier merged. At the time, the Democratic Party had 636 members, 8 legislators and 57 District Council members, while the Frontier had one legislator, Emily Lau, three District Councillors and around 110 members. In the following month, Albert Ho was re-elected chairman, and Emily Lau became a Vice-Chairman of the new combined party in the party leadership election.

=== 2010 reform negotiations (2008–2012) ===
In the following electoral reform for the 2012 Chief Executive and LegCo elections in 2009 and 2010, Donald Tsang proposed a reform package which had not much difference from the 2005 proposal. The pan-democracy camp were saying they were going to veto it again. The Civic Party and League of Social Democrats launched a de facto referendum by resigning and triggering territory-wide by-elections to let the voters voice out their demand on democracy. The Democratic Party refused to participate as it argued it was not an effective way. The party's heavyweight veteran Szeto Wah said the Democratic Party would not join in the resignations itself, but would support pan-democrats who stood for re-election. In December 2009, the Democratic Party members voted 229 voted against, 54 in favour and one abstention not to join the resignation plan after a four-hour debate at a general meeting.

Instead in May 2010, the party leaders met with the officials of the Central Government's Liaison Office in Hong Kong to negotiate on the reform package, which was the first meeting between Democratic Party leaders and senior officials from the central government since the Tiananmen massacre of 1989. The central government subsequently accepted the Democratic Party's revised proposal in the run-up to the LegCo vote, which allowed the five new functional constituency members of LegCo to be elected by popular vote. However, the Democratic Party failed to get any promises on the 2017 Chief Executive and 2020 Legco elections. The Democratic Party's move significantly divided the opinion within the pan-democracy camp but the bill was ultimately passed in June 2010 with the support of the Democratic Party. After the agreement with Beijing, 30 Young Turk Reformists (comprising 4% of the membership) left the party before the December Party leadership election, accusing their leaders of betraying the people and slowing the pace towards universal suffrage. LegCo member Andrew Cheng had also quit the party earlier at the LegCo voting in June.

The party's refusal of participating the by-election and the agreement with Beijing heavily damaged the solidarity of the pan-democracy camp. The "radical" League of Social Democrats accused the Democratic Party for "selling out" Hong Kong people. During the annual 1 July march in 2010, the Democratic Party leaders were verbally attacked by other democratic protestors, who chanted "Shame on you, Democratic Party, for selling out Hong Kong people."

In the Election Committee Subsector elections in December 2011, the pan-democracy camp was able to get more than 150 seats to secure the threshold of nominating a candidate in the 2012 Chief Executive election. Democratic Party chairman Albert Ho won over Frederick Fung of ADPL in the pan-democracy primary election and stood for the camp in the election. The election was dominated by the two candidates from the pro-Beijing camp, Henry Tang and Leung Chun-ying and marked by scandals, dirty tactics and smears from both sides. Albert Ho fell behind in the opinion poll throughout the campaign partly due to the impossibility of him being elected by the Beijing-controlled Election Committee. The pan-democracy camp called for casting blank votes on the election day. During the election 1,132 votes were cast, CY Leung received 689; Henry Tang received 285, and Albert Ho received 76.

=== Umbrella movement and aftermath (2012–2019) ===
In March 2013, the Democrats formed the Alliance for True Democracy with other pan democratic parties for pressing the government to give out a genuinely democratic reform proposal. The party supported Benny Tai's Occupy Central with Love and Peace proposal to launch a civil disobedience movement to further pressure the Beijing government. The party took a supporting role in the 2014 Hong Kong protests with around a dozen of its party heavyweights arrested. In June 2015, the party voted against the government's proposal.

In the 2015 District Council election, the Democrats won total number of 43 seats with several second-tier figures, including vice-chairman Lo Kin-hei and chief executive Lam Cheuk-ting, scored victories, while others like former chairman Albert Ho and vice-chairman Andrew Wan lost.

For the 2016 Legislative Council election, the party proposed an unprecedented pre-election primary to hold public debates before selecting candidates for each constituency. 14 nominations were received on 31 December 2015, in which three incumbents, chairperson Emily Lau and veterans Albert Ho and Sin Chung-kai did not seek for re-election to hasten the party's rejuvenation.

In the December leadership election, legislator Wu Chi-wai was elected new chairman without contest. The Democrats supported former Financial Secretary John Tsang, making the first time a pro-democracy party to support an establishment candidate, after the pro-democrats decided not to field their candidate to boost the chance of an alternative candidate against incumbent Leung Chun-ying. The Democrats opposed former Chief Secretary for Administration Carrie Lam, the eventual winner of the election. However, the party has developed a warmer relationship with Carrie Lam government, evident in the attendance and donation of the Chief Executive to the party's 2018 anniversary dinner.

The Democrats suffered a historic loss of headcount on 12 December 2018 when 59 members, including five District Councillors from New Territories East, resigned en masse, after a row over the 2019 District Council election, accusing Legislative Councillor Lam Cheuk-ting of despicable character, his lack of political ethics and conflict of interest.

The relations between the party and Carrie Lam turned sour as the administration was embattled numerous controversies including the raising of the age threshold for the Comprehensive Social Security Assistance and the dropping of Leung Chun-ying's UGL case. Lam was not invited to the party's 24th anniversary dinner in March 2019. The relations between Lam and the party completely fell out in May 2019 over the extradition law controversy in which the Democrats strongly opposed. Party chairman Wu Chi-wai even shouted at Lam "Why don't you die? You're a waste of life, bitch!" at a LegCo meeting after Lam dismissed the opposition views as "extreme" and "unnecessary fear" and called the claims that it was a deliberate decision by the colonial government to exclude the mainland from any rendition arrangements in the 1990s as "nonsense". On 29 May, Democrat Andrew Wan moved the first motion of no confidence against Lam since she took the office on the grounds that she "blatantly lied" about the extradition bill and misled the public and the international community. The motion was defeated by the pro-Beijing majority.

=== Anti-extradition protest and security law (2019–2023) ===
The Democratic Party quickly warned about the possibility that the 2019 Hong Kong extradition bill could be used by China to have political dissidents extradited, and was supportive to the protestors, subsequently became the largest party in the 2019 local elections. Democratic party member Lam Cheuk-ting was injured in the 2019 Yuen Long attack. In August 2020, he was arrested on charges of rioting during that attack, and again in December 2020 for allegedly disclosing the personal information of individuals connected to it.

The Hong Kong national security law was imposed by the Chinese Government in 2020, criticised as silencing the dissidents. The Party faced political pressure from the government and pro-Beijing camp. After the legislative election, which the democrats were aiming to secure a majority, was delayed, Democratic Party legislators remained in the parliament despite divisions in the supporters. All LegCo members from the Party resigned later that year along with allied colleagues after Beijing ousted four legislators, leaving the party with no representation for the first time since the Provisional Legislative Council. Some party seniors, including former chairman Wu Chi-wai, ex-MP Lam Cheuk-ting, Andrew Wan, were arrested in early 2021 and jailed for collusion. Lo Kin-hei, the chairperson, along with three ex-chairs, Albert Ho, Martin Lee, Yeung Sum, each faced various charges. The government introduced a requirement that all district councillors had to swear an oath of allegiance to Hong Kong and China, upon which a majority of pro-democracy councillors, fearful of retroactive disqualification and bankruptcy threats, chose to resign from their office after reports of possible disqualification for not upholding the Basic Law.

The Democratic Party did not field a candidate for the 2021 legislative election, the first time since handover of Hong Kong in 1997, after a two-week application period to nominate party members ended without a candidate stepping forward. Beijing loyalists had warned the Party not to "boycott" the election. Party divisions were exposed as Fred Li, former Democratic MP, Edith Leung, vice-chairlady, and So Yat-hang, member of the Central Committee, supported non-establishment candidate without party's consent, of which the former two were expelled from the party. Democrats re-elected Lo Kin-hei in December 2022 as chairman, days after Lo was acquitted of participating in an unlawful assembly close to the 2019 Polytechnic University siege.

The party did not run in the 2023 local elections after its members failed to obtain enough nominations required after an overhaul of election rules, while Fred Li was not re-appointed by the government as member of the quango Travel Industry Authority. This left the Democratic Party without any elected representatives nor public office positions starting from 2024, for the first time since its formation.

=== Dissolution (2024–2025) ===
==== Preparation ====
During the short consultation of the domestic national security law, also known as Article 23, the Democratic Party argued the wording of the bill was overly vague and the low threshold to incriminate others, which could create more "chilling effect" and harming the international reputation of Hong Kong. Their suggestions, along with the allied parties, were not accepted and the bill was fast-tracked in the Legislative Council in March 2024 for passage. In the ensuing months, the party met the press on several polices only, which effectively turned itself to a "pressure group". In December, Lo was again re-elected party chair with an expanded central committee but leaving one of the vice-chairmanship vacant. The chair said the party would continue its work.

It was later reported that a party member was approached by someone "with Beijing official background" in November or December, conveying the message that the Chinese government believed "the historic mission of the party is over". That person said Beijing would not allow the party, which no longer has any intrinsic value, to run in the December Legislative Council election. Multiple colleagues in the party received similar information from the "messenger" which was interpreted as an attempt to clear all remaining opposition voices. Fred Li said the "messenger" suggested the party cannot survive until the election month.

Media reported that there were internal discussions for months on the future of the group, and inclined to disband it with the possible legal and safety risks. Party members were reportedly threatened by Beijing officials to disband the party or otherwise face consequences such as arrests. The end of the party speeded up after the central committee was likely demanded in around February, possibly from Beijing side, to start dissolution process at the upcoming meeting or risk a ban from the authorities. The central committee, although with divisions, agreed to end the party after a meeting on 20 February 2025, just days after reports emerged over the possible closure. The central committee of the party setting up a task force to look into procedures before dissolving the party, which would require support from 75% of the attending members of the party congress. Lo Kin-hei declined to comment on whether they were pressurized, but stated that the party was not in financial difficulties and the decision was made with consideration of the political factors.

The dissolution came as a surprise amidst calm political atmosphere in the city, given that Democratic Party was one of the modest and patriotic party in the opposition camp. Pro-Beijing media and politicians waged attacks on the flagship party, saying the disbandment was self-inflicted and the only way ahead. Sing Tao Daily said the senior democrats did not apologise or take up responsibilities for the anti-extradition bill protests, which led to the decision by Beijing to bar the party from participating in elections.

On the evening of 20 February 2025, the Democratic Party's Central Committee held a meeting. After the meeting, Lo Kin-hei announced that the Central Committee had decided to dissolve the Democratic Party. It also decided to set up a group composed of Lo Kin-hei, vice chairman Mok Kin-shing and secretary-general Liang Yongquan to handle the dissolution and liquidation arrangements. On 13 April, Lo announced that 90 percent of 110 members at a special general meeting for the group to start making arrangements for its dissolution, including resolving legal and accounting matters.

==== Liquidation ====
On 14 December, one week after local legislative elections in Hong Kong, the Democratic Party disbanded in an extraordinary meeting, with 121 votes cast for disbanding, and 4 abstentions. The Associated Press described the dissolution as "marking the end of an era of the Chinese semiautonomous city's once-diverse political landscape". The South China Morning Post similarly described the event as the "end of an era". Reuters called it the culmination of China's years-long pressure campaign against Hong Kong. The dissolution occurred one day before the anticipated verdict of Hong Kong pro-democracy activist Jimmy Lai's landmark trial.

After the meeting party chairman Lo Kin-hei continued to express his faith in the pro-democracy camp, stating "If Hong Kong people believe that democracy is the way to go, I believe that they will keep on striving for democracy." Former Democratic Party chairwoman Emily Lau expressed her disapproval of the party's dissolution.

== Organisation ==
The Democratic Party was governed by a Central Committee, originally 30-member large but reduced to 10 in 2022, including one chairmanship and two vice-chairmanships elected by the party congress. All public office holders, including the members of the Legislative Council and District Councils, were eligible to vote in the party congress. The electoral method changed since 2014, the eligibility of members electing a delegate who holds one vote in the congress from 30 members each delegate to only 5 members. Candidate for the chairmanship also needed a majority to claim victory.

== Factions and ideology ==
The Democratic Party holds liberal values, and considered by different scholars as a big tent, centre, centre-left or left-wing party. It had around 400 members at the time of dissolution, down from 600 in 2002 and 700 in 2016.

- Mainstreamers – led by the "Cheung-Yeung-Lee triumvirate", Cheung Man-kwong, Yeung Sum, and Lee Wing-tat and consisting of members including Albert Ho and Sin Chung-kai.
- Moderates – consisted of former members of the Meeting Point, including Tik Chi-yuen, Lo Chi-kin, Andrew Fung and led by the former Meeting Point chairman Anthony Cheung. The Meeting Point faction preferred a more pro-middle class, pro-market and moderate agenda. It also stressed dialogue with Beijing and Hong Kong governments over struggle, and parliamentary politics over street action. Anthony Cheung quit the party in 2004 and was appointed to the Secretary for Transport and Housing by Leung Chun-ying in 2012; Andrew Fung quit the party in 2012 in an unpleasant manner and was appointed government's information coordinator in 2013. Tik left the party in 2015 to form Third Side.
- Young Turks – consisted of the relatively radical, left-wing and pro-grassroots activists and local-level party members including Steve Chan Kwok-leung, Tsang Kin-shing, Andrew Cheng, Albert Chan and Eric Wong Chung-ki. Led by Andrew To, the Young Turks believed that the party should take struggle over dialogue and mass movements over parliamentary politics as the party's strategy. They also suggested adopting more grassroots platform such as minimum wage. The Young Turks were more like a "factional clique" than an organised faction as they were a group of young politicians with poor discipline and only had some vague common ideas, without a clear leader, coherent ideologies or positions. The Young Turks attempted to challenge the party leadership by nominating Lau Chin-shek to run for vice-chairman against Anthony Cheung in the 1998 party leadership election. Lau was expelled from the party in 2000 and Andrew To, Tsang Kin-shing and Albert Chan left the party and subsequently formed the left-wing League of Social Democrats in 2006.
- Reformists – as many original Young Turks left, a new Reformist group emerged as the main opposition faction against the Mainstreamers party leadership, which included Chan King-ming who contested for chairman in the 2004 election and 2006 election and Legislative Council member Andrew Cheng. New Territories East was the Reformists' stronghold; Chan King-ming was the Chairman of the New Territories East branch and Andrew Cheng was the legislator from the same constituency. The faction was involved in alleged spying activities of China which led to the intra-party investigation in 2006. Andrew Cheng and other Reformists quit after the party supported the controversial electoral reform package. Many of them became the backbone of the Neo Democrats formed in 2010.

== Electoral performance ==
=== Chief Executive elections ===
Election	Candidate	No. of votes	% of votes
2005	Lee Wing-tat	Not nominated	
2012	Albert Ho	76	7.24

=== Legislative Council elections ===
Election	Number of popular votes	% of popular votes	GC seats	FC seats	EC seats	Total seats	+/−	Position
1995	385,428	41.87	12	5	2	19 / 60	4▲	1st
1998	634,635▲	42.87▲	9	4	0	13 / 60	–	1st
2000	417,873▼	31.66▼	9	3	0	12 / 60	0	1st
2004	445,988▲	25.19▼	7	2		9 / 60	2▼	3rd▼
2008	312,692▼	20.63▼	7	1		8 / 60	1▼	2nd
2012	247,220▼	13.65▼	4	2		6 / 70	2▼	2nd
2016	199,876▼	9.22▼	5	2		7 / 70	1▲	2nd
2021	Did not contest		0	0	0	0 / 90	0	N/A

=== Municipal elections ===
Election	Number of popular votes	% of popular votes	UrbCo seats	RegCo seats	Total elected seats
1995	205,823	36.91	12 / 32	11 / 27	23 / 59

=== District Council elections ===
Election	Number of popular votes	% of popular votes	Total elected seats	+/−
1994	157,929	23.01	75 / 346	15▲
1999	201,461▲	24.85▲	86 / 390	13▲
2003	223,675▲	21.27▼	95 / 400	17▲
2007	175,054▼	15.38▼	59 / 405	21▼
2011	205,716▲	17.42▲	47 / 412	3▼
2015	196,068▼	13.56▼	43 / 431	1▲
2019	362,275▲	12.36▼	91 / 452	54▲
2023	Did not contest		0 / 470	7▼

== Leadership ==
=== Chairpersons ===
№	Portrait	Chairperson (Birth–Death)	Constituency	Took office	Left office	Duration	Leadership election
1		Martin Lee (born 1938)	Hong Kong Island East (1991–1997); Hong Kong Island (1998–2008)	2 October 1994 (Note: As Chairman of the United Democrats from 23 April 1990 to 2 October 1994.)	1 December 2002	8 years and 61 days	1994, 1996, 1998, 2000
2		Yeung Sum (born 1947)	Hong Kong Island	1 December 2002	17 December 2004	2 years and 17 days	2002
3		Lee Wing-tat (born 1955)	New Territories West	17 December 2004	17 December 2006	2 years and 1 day	2004
4		Albert Ho (born 1951)	New Territories West	17 December 2006	10 September 2012 (Note: Resigned, Emily Lau served as acting chair between 10 September and 16 December 2012.)	5 years and 269 days	2006, 2008, 2010
5		Emily Lau (born 1952)	New Territories East	10 September 2012	4 December 2016	4 years and 86 days	2012, 2014
6		Wu Chi-wai (born 1962)	Kowloon East	4 December 2016	6 December 2020	4 years and 3 days	2016, 2018
7		Lo Kin-hei (born 1984)	Lei Tung II (District Council, 2011–2021)	6 December 2020	14 December 2025	4 years and 9 days	2020, 2022, 2024

=== Vice-Chairpersons ===
Vice-Chairperson		Vice-Chairperson		Chairperson
Yeung Sum	1994–2000	Anthony Cheung	1994–98	Martin Lee
Yeung Sum	1994–2000	Lau Chin-shek	1998	Martin Lee
Yeung Sum	1994–2000	Albert Ho	1999–2000	Martin Lee
Law Chi-kwong	2000–02	Lee Wing-tat	2000–04	Martin Lee
Albert Ho	2002–06	Lee Wing-tat	2000–04	Yeung Sum
Albert Ho	2002–06	Chan King-ming	2004–06	Lee Wing-tat
Sin Chung-kai	2006–12	Tik Chi-yuen	2006–08	Albert Ho
Sin Chung-kai	2006–12	Emily Lau	2008–12	Albert Ho
Lo Kin-hei	2012–20	Richard Tsoi	2012–14	Emily Lau
Lo Kin-hei	2012–20	Andrew Wan	2014–16	Emily Lau
Lo Kin-hei	2012–20	Li Wing-shing	2016–18	Wu Chi-wai
Lo Kin-hei	2012–20	Andrew Wan	2018–20	Wu Chi-wai
Edith Leung	2020–22	Lam Cheuk-ting	2020–21	Lo Kin-hei
Edith Leung	2020–22	Lee Wing-tat	2021–22	Lo Kin-hei
Vacant (resigned)		Vacant (resigned)		Lo Kin-hei
Mok Kin-shing	2022–25	Bonnie Ng	2022–24	Lo Kin-hei
Mok Kin-shing	2022–25	Vacant (Not up for election)		Lo Kin-hei

=== Secretaries ===
- Law Chi-kwong, 1994–1998
- Cheung Yin-tung, 1998–2006
- Peggy Ha Ving-vung, 2006–08
- Cheung Yin-tung, 2008–14, 2016–20
- Li Wing-shing, 2014–16
- Shum Wan-wa, 2020–22
- Leung Wing-kuen, 2022–25

=== Treasurers ===
- Andrew Fung Wai-kwong, 1994–2000
- Wong Bing-kuen, 2000–02
- Tsui Hon-kwong, 2002–06
- Cheung Yin-tung, 2006–08
- Tsui Hon-kwong, 2008–12
- Stanley Ng, 2012–14
- Ramon Yuen, 2014–18
- Sin Chung-kai, 2018–21
- Kelvin Sin Cheuk-nam, 2022–24

=== Vice-secretaries ===
- Mark Li Kin-yin, 2014–2016

== See also ==
- Democratic development in Hong Kong
- Liberalism in Hong Kong
- Liberal democracy
- List of major liberal parties considered left

== Bibliography ==
- Allen, Jamie (1997). Seeing Red: China's Uncompromising Takeover of Hong Kong. Taylor & Francis. ISBN 9810080832.
- Beatty, Bob (2003). Democracy, Asian Values, and Hong Kong: Evaluating Political Elite Beliefs. Greenwood Publishing Group. ISBN 0275976882.
- Bush, Richard C. (2005). Untying the Knot: Making Peace in the Taiwan Strait. Brookings Institution Press. ISBN 0815797818.
- Chan, Ming K. (1997). The Challenge of Hong Kong's Reintegration with China: Modern Diasporic Femininity. Hong Kong University Press. ISBN 9622094414.
- Chan, Ming K. (2008). China's Hong Kong Transformed: Retrospect and Prospects Beyond the First Decade. City University of HK Press. ISBN 978-9629371685.
- Europa Publications Staff, ed. (2002). The Far East and Australasia 2003. Psychology Press. ISBN 1857431332.
- Joseph, William A. (2010). Politics in China: An Introduction. Oxford University Press. ISBN 978-0195335309.
- Khun, Eng Kuah; Gilles, Guiheux, eds. (2009). Social Movements in China and Hong Kong: The Expansion of Protest Space. Amsterdam University Press. ISBN 978-9089641311.
- Krasner, Stephen D. (2013). Problematic Sovereignty: Contested Rules and Political Possibilities. Columbia University Press. ISBN 978-0231505413.
- Kuan, Hsin-chi; Lau, Siu-kai; Wong, Timothy Ka-ying, eds. (2002). Out of the Shadow of 1997?: The 2000 Legislative Council Election in the Hong Kong Special Administrative Region. Chinese University Press. ISBN 9629960303.
- Lam, Wai-man; Lui, Percy Luen-tim; Wong, Wilson, eds. (2012). Contemporary Hong Kong Government and Politics: Expanded Second Edition. Hong Kong University Press. ISBN 9789888139477.
- Lau, Siu-kai; Louie, Kin-shuen, eds. (1993). Hong Kong tried democracy: the 1991 elections in Hong Kong. Hong Kong Institute of Asia-Pacific Studies, Chinese University of Hong Kong. ISBN 978-962-441-515-5.
- Lee, Eliza Wing-Yee, ed. (2011). Gender and Change in Hong Kong: Globalization, Postcolonialism, and Chinese Patriarchy. UBC Press. ISBN 978-0774841900.
- Nery, Felipe B. (2008). A Collection of Poems and Essays of Past Decades Involving Discussions of Important Matters and Topics. AuthorHouse.
- Pepper, Suzanne (2008). Keeping Democracy at Bay: Hong Kong and the Challenge of Chinese Political Reform. Rowman & Littlefield. ISBN 978-0742508774.
- Poon, Kit (2007). The Political Future of Hong Kong: Democracy Within Communist China. Routledge. ISBN 978-0415434386.
- Preston, Ian (2001). A Political Chronology of Central, South and East Asia. Psychology Press. ISBN 1857431146.
- Sharpe, M. E. (2001). Chinese Law and Government. Vol. 34.
