= Tik Chi-yuen =

Member of the Hong Kong Legislative Council

Tik Chi-yuen SBS JP
- 狄志遠
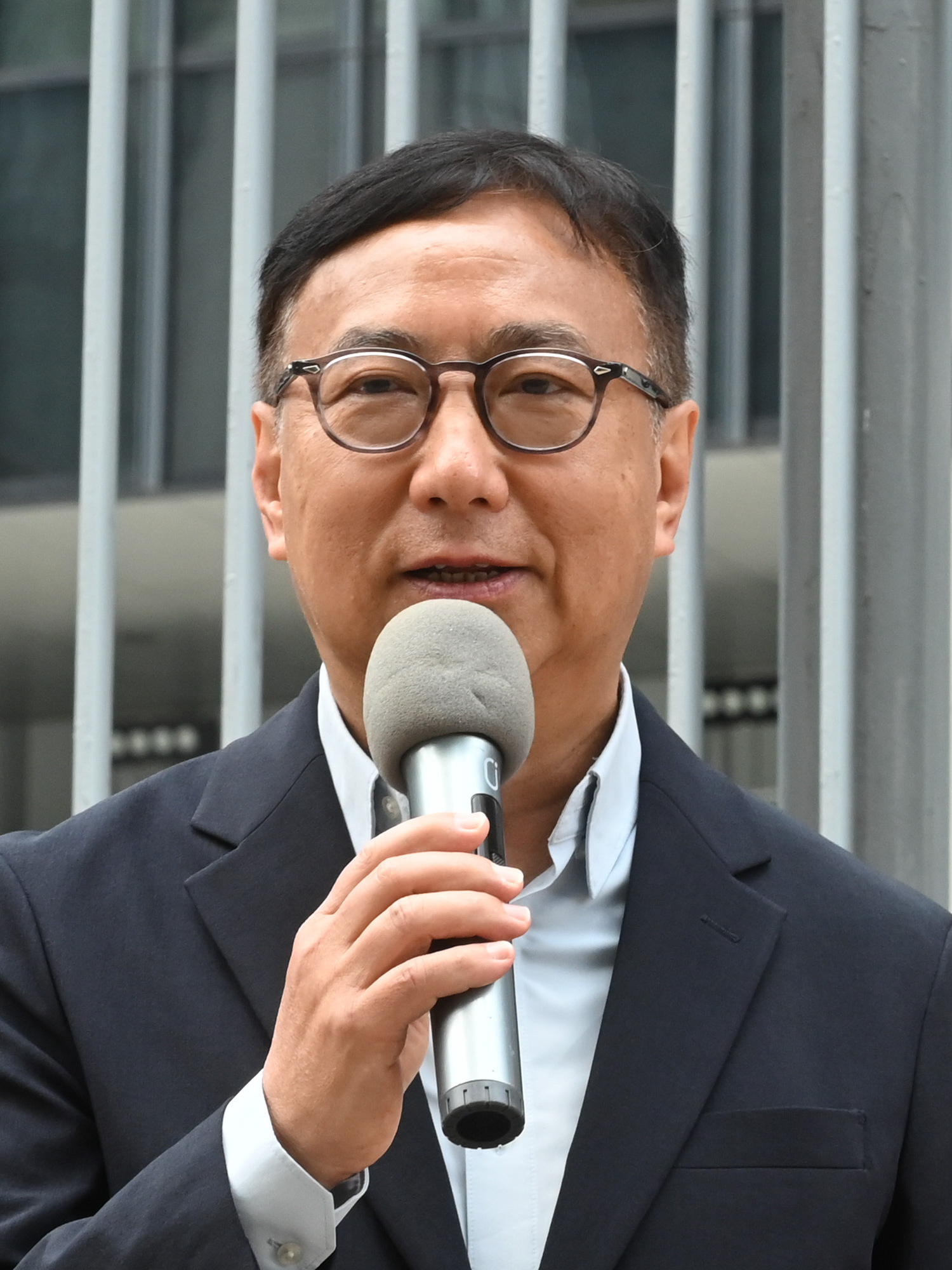
- Tik in 2025

Member of the Legislative Council
- In office 1 January 2022 – 31 December 2025
- Preceded by: Shiu Ka-chun (2020)
- Succeeded by: Grace Chan
- Constituency: Social Welfare
- In office 9 October 1991 – 31 July 1995 Serving with Fung Chi-wood
- Constituency: New Territories North

Chairman of Third Side
- Incumbent
- Assumed office 3 January 2016
- Preceded by: Party Established

Vice-Chairperson of the Democratic Party
- In office 2006–2008 Serving with Sin Chung-kai
- Preceded by: Chan King-ming
- Succeeded by: Emily Lau

Personal details
- Born: 24 September 1957 (age 68) British Hong Kong
- Party: Meeting Point (1985–1994); Democratic Party (1994–2015); Third Side (2016–present)

Tik Chi-yuen
- Traditional Chinese: 狄志遠
- Simplified Chinese: 狄志远
Transcriptions
Standard Mandarin
- Hanyu Pinyin: Dí Zhìyuǎn
Yue: Cantonese
- Jyutping: dik6 zi3 jyun5

Tik Chi-yuen SBS JP (Chinese: 狄志遠) is a former member of the Hong Kong Legislative Council and also a former District Councilor of North District. He is a registered social worker and chairman of the small centrist Third Side party, which he co-founded in 2015, after quitting the Democratic Party, of which he was also a co-founder.

== Background ==
He was the chairman of the Committee on Home-School Co-operation, member of the Commission on Strategic Development, Council for Sustainable Development and the Commission on Poverty.

In 2008, Tik took part in the social welfare functional constituency election in the 2008 Hong Kong legislative election. But he was defeated by Cheung Kwok Che, the president of the Hong Kong Social Workers General Union.

On 9 September 2015, he quit the Democratic Party after he supported the constitutional reform package which the party opposed and denounced by some party members.

He then founded and is now the chairman of Third Side, a centrist party in Hong Kong.

In 2021, he won a seat in 2021 Hong Kong Election Committee Subsector elections.

In December 2021, Tik was elected in 2021 Hong Kong legislative election in Social Welfare constituency with 1,400 votes, making him the only non-Pro-Beijing Legislative Council member in this term.

On 16 February 2022, Tik, along with the other 89 members of the Legislative Council, made a statement of gratitude to Chinese Communist Party general secretary Xi Jinping for his "guidance" in fighting the COVID-19 pandemic in Hong Kong.

In July 2022, Tik attended a seminar to "learn and promote" the spirit of Xi Jinping's important speech.

In November 2023, he was part of a group of lawmakers who said that the 2023 Gay Games may infringe on the national security law.

In October 2025, Tik announced he would not seek re-election in 2025 Legislative Council election.

Legislative Council of Hong Kong
New constituency	Member of Legislative Council; Representative for New Territories North; 1991–1995; Served alongside: Fung Chi-wood	Succeeded by Cheung Hon-chung
Preceded by Shiu Ka-chun	Member of Legislative Council; Representative for Social Welfare; 2022–2025	Succeeded by Chan Man-yee
Party political offices
Preceded by Chan King-ming	Vice Chairperson of Democratic Party; 2006–2008; Served alongside: Sin Chung-kai	Succeeded by Emily Lau
