= Wong Sing-chi =

Hong Kong politician

- 黃成智
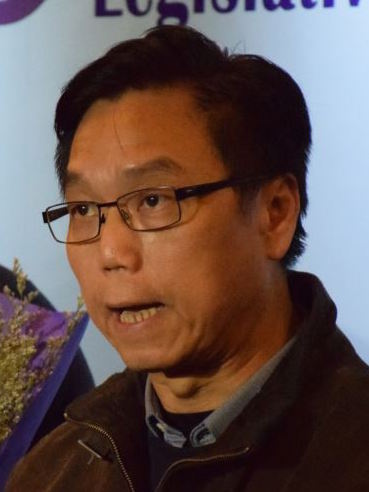
- Wong Sing-chi after the 2016 Legislative Council by-election

Member of the Legislative Council
- In office 1 October 2008 – 30 September 2012
- Preceded by: James Tien
- Succeeded by: Ray Chan
- Constituency: New Territories East
- In office 1 October 2000 – 30 September 2004
- Preceded by: Cyd Ho
- Succeeded by: James Tien
- Constituency: New Territories East

Personal details
- Born: 11 October 1957 (age 68) Hong Kong
- Party: Meeting Point (until 1994); Democratic Party (1994–2015); Third Side (2015–2016)
- Education: Hong Kong Polytechnic University
- Occupation: Social Worker

Wong Sing-chi
- Traditional Chinese: 黃成智
- Simplified Chinese: 黄成智
Transcriptions
Standard Mandarin
- Hanyu Pinyin: Huáng Chéngzhì
Yue: Cantonese
- Jyutping: Wong4 Sing4 Ji3

Nelson Wong Sing-chi (born 11 October 1957) is a Hong Kong politician and social worker. He had been member of the Legislative Council of Hong Kong between 2000–04 and 2008–12. He was the founding member of the Democratic Party before he was expelled in 2015 for his support in the government's constitutional reform proposals. He was also briefly a founding member of the Third Side, a centrist political party.

He is also former member of the North District Council and Regional Council.

== Background ==
Wong was born in Hong Kong in 1957. He obtained his Bachelor of Social Work from Hong Kong Polytechnic University and was a social worker before joining Hong Kong politics. He was the member of the Meeting Point a liberal party and was first elected to the North District Board in Choi Yuen with party mate Tik Chi-yuen. He became the founding member of the Democratic Party when the Meeting Point was merged with the United Democrats of Hong Kong.

He lost his seat in North District Council in the 1994 District Board elections to So Sai-chi of the pro-Beijing Democratic Alliance for the Betterment of Hong Kong (DAB), who became his long-time rival in the area. He was nevertheless elected to the Regional Council in 1995 and served until it was abolished in 1999.

== Legco member ==
Wong ran for the Legislative Council (Legco) in New Territories North in 1995 but lost to DAB's Cheung Hon-chung. He ran in New Territories East in the 1998 Legislative Council election, placing second on the list behind Andrew Cheng Kar-foo and helped Cheng to get elected. In the 2000 election, the Democratic Party split Cheng and Wong into two tickets to avoid wasting the votes as the electoral mechanism was largest remainder method and the strategy got them both elected with fewer votes.

He lost in 2004 through a weak electoral strategy; as all the pro-democratic candidates formed a combined party-list in the election, Wong was placed in fourth behind Andrew Cheng, Emily Lau Wai-hing and Ronny Tong Ka-wah who all got elected. Before that he also lost his seat in the District Council in 2003 as his changed his constituency to challenge So Sai-chi in Choi Yuen.

He returned to the Legco in 2008 in a successful strategic voting with Andrew Cheng. In June 2010, he voted with his party in favour of the government's 2012 constitutional reform package, which included the late amendment by the Democratic Party – accepted by the Beijing government – to hold a popular vote for five new District Council functional constituencies. He also returned to North District Council in 2007 election, running in Shek Wu Hui. In 2011, he was defeated by So Sai-chi again in Choi Yuen.

Wong was defeated in the 2012 election, which left the Democratic Party only one representative in New Territories East, Emily Lau.

=== Gay rights ===
Wong is an evangelical Christian and a social conservative. He opposed amendments to the Domestic Violence Ordinance that would offer same-sex couples equal protection under the law on the grounds that the amendment would include same-sex relationships as if they were couples. He opposed the government would take actions go a step further to make laws which prohibited discrimination against the LGBT people. This position give him as the same attitude with other pro-Beijing conservative members in Legco, such as Priscilla Leung. Wong's conservative stances on gay rights made him different with other pan-democrats, which many of them take liberal stances on social issues.

== Third Side ==
In July 2015, Wong was expelled from the Democratic Party due to his defiance of the party line and clandestine proposal in support of the government's constitutional reform package, which was panned by pan-democrats for being "fake universal suffrage". He later set up a moderate party, the Third Side, with ex-Democrat Tik Chi-yuen which aimed for a middle-of-the-road approach between the pan-democrats and pro-Beijing camp.

He ran in the 2015 District Council election in Fanling South in his North District base but was not elected. In 2016, he also ran in the Legislative Council by-election in New Territories East, receiving 17,295 votes, 4% of the total ballots and failed to return to the Legislative Council. In July 2016, he left the Third Side to contest the Social Welfare constituency in the upcoming legislative election after failing to get the party's approval. He received the fewest votes in the five-candidate contest.

Legislative Council of Hong Kong
Preceded by Cyd Ho	Member of Legislative Council; Representative for New Territories East; 2000–2004	Succeeded by James Tien
Preceded by James Tien	Member of Legislative Council; Representative for New Territories East; 2008–2012	Succeeded by Ray Chan
