= Josephine Chan =

Hong Kong politician

Josephine Chan Shu-ying (Chinese: 陳樹英; born 18 November 1958) is a Hong Kong politician and former chairman of the Tuen Mun District Council. As a Democratic Party member, Chan has been member of the Tuen Mun District Council from 1994 to 2015 and again from 2020 to 2021 for Siu Hong constituency and former member of the Regional Council.

== Biography ==
Chan was graduated from the University of Hong Kong in 1982 and became a secondary school teacher at Buddhist Sum Heung Lam Memorial College, where she met her husband Lee Wing-tat. She married Lee in 1984 but divorced in 1990 and remarried Lee in 2001.

Chan was first elected to the Tuen Mun District Board in the 1994 election, where she won a seat in Siu Hong. She was consecutively re-elected for four occasions, but lost to Mo Shing-fung of the pro-Beijing Democratic Alliance for the Betterment and Progress of Hong Kong (DAB). She regained her seat in the 2019 election, where the pro-democrats gained the majority of the seat and elected Chan was the first female chairwoman of the council.

Chan was also an elected member of the Regional Council elected in 1995. She lost her Regional Council seat when Chief Executive Tung Chee-hwa abolished the two municipal councils in 1999. Chan filed a judicial review application to the courts, claiming that the dissolution of municipal councils was "constitutionally defective" but the application was rejected by Justice Michael Hartmann.

Chan also ran for the Legislative Council, running on the Democratic Party's ticket in New Territories West. In 2004, she contested in the Catering functional constituency but lost to incumbent Liberal Party's Tommy Cheung. She ran again in 2012 for New Territories West as a first candidate, but failed to get elected with 25,892 votes.

Political offices
New constituency	Member of Tuen Mun District Council; Representative for Siu Hong; 1994–2015	Succeeded by Mo Shing-fung
New constituency	Member of Regional Council; Representative for Tuen Mun North; 1995–1999	Council abolished
Preceded by Mo Shing-fung	Member of Tuen Mun District Council; Representative for Siu Hong; 2020–2021	Vacant
Preceded by Leung Kin-man	Chairman of Tuen Mun District Council; 2020–2021	Succeeded by Chan Yau-hoi
