= Chan King-ming =

Hong Kong politician and academic

- Traditional Chinese: 陳竟明
- Simplified Chinese: 陈竟明
Transcriptions
Standard Mandarin
- Hanyu Pinyin: Chén Jìngmíng
Yue: Cantonese
- Jyutping: Chan^{4} Ging^{2}ming^{4}

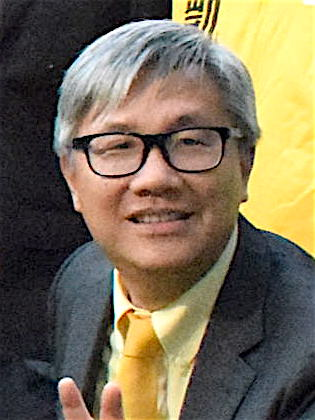
Chan King-ming as the convenor of the Neo Democrats, 2015.

Chan King-ming is a Hong Kong politician and academic. He served as the vice-chairman of the Democratic Party of Hong Kong from 2004 to 2006. He is also an associate professor in the department of biochemistry and Environmental Science Program of the Chinese University of Hong Kong.

== Academic career ==
Chan King-ming earned his Bachelor of Science and Master of Philosophy degrees at the Chinese University of Hong Kong, and his doctoral degree from Memorial University of Newfoundland in St. John's, Newfoundland, Canada.

He is now director of the Environmental Science Program at the Chinese University of Hong Kong. He teaches many different courses including Current Environmental Issues, Biochemical Toxicology and Introduction to Environmental Science in the Environmental Science Program and Molecular Endocrinology in the Biochemistry Programme. Trained as a molecular biologist for his PhD and post-doctoral research, Professor Chan's research interests include gene regulation, aquatic toxicology, marine biotechnology and environmental biochemistry and environmental policy. Prof. Chan is also chairman of CUTA (Chinese University Teachers Association), trustee of Shaw College Board of trustees, Member of Assembly of Fellows, Shaw College, and warden of Hostel 2, Shaw College.

== Political career ==
Chan is a founding member of the Democratic Party. He was elected as chairman of the New Territories East Branch in 1999, and later became the party's minister of organization affairs and central committee member. He ran for the chairmanship election in 2004 but lost to Lee Wing-tat. He was then elected vice-chairman of the party. He also served as a part-time member of Central Policy Unit of the Hong Kong Government between 2004 and 2006.

He ran again for the chairmanship in December 2006, but lost to Albert Ho. He did not seek to run for the vice-chairmanship in the 2006 election. In 2010, the Democratic Party decided to support the government's proposal of the political reform package to expand the numbers of legislative council members from 30 to 35 in Geographical Constituency and 30 to 35 of Functional Constituency by adopting the idea of the "Super-district Councillors" which will be voted across the territory after nominations by District Councillors. Younger members of the Democratic Party including Chan believed that such proposal could not provide any significant progress towards democratic development in local political agenda.

In December 2010, Chan quit the party due to the electoral reform to found the Neo Democrats and is the incumbent convenor of the party. The Neo Democrats campaigned in the 2011 District Council election and won a total of 8 seats.

== Affiliations ==
Chan is a current member of the Professional Teachers' Union (HK), Hong Kong Marine Biological Association, Society of Toxicology (SOT) in the US, American Fisheries Society, American Physiological Society, etc.

He is now chairman (elected) of the Teachers' Association of Chinese University (2011–12). He also serves as warden of Student Hostel 2 of Shaw College, member of the board of trustees of Shaw College, and member of the Assembly of Fellows, Shaw College, Chinese University.

Party political offices
Preceded by Lee Wing-tat	Vice Chairperson of Democratic Party; 2004–2006; Served alongside: Albert Ho	Succeeded by Tik Chi-yuen
