= Cheung Yin-tung =

Hong Kong politician

- 張賢登
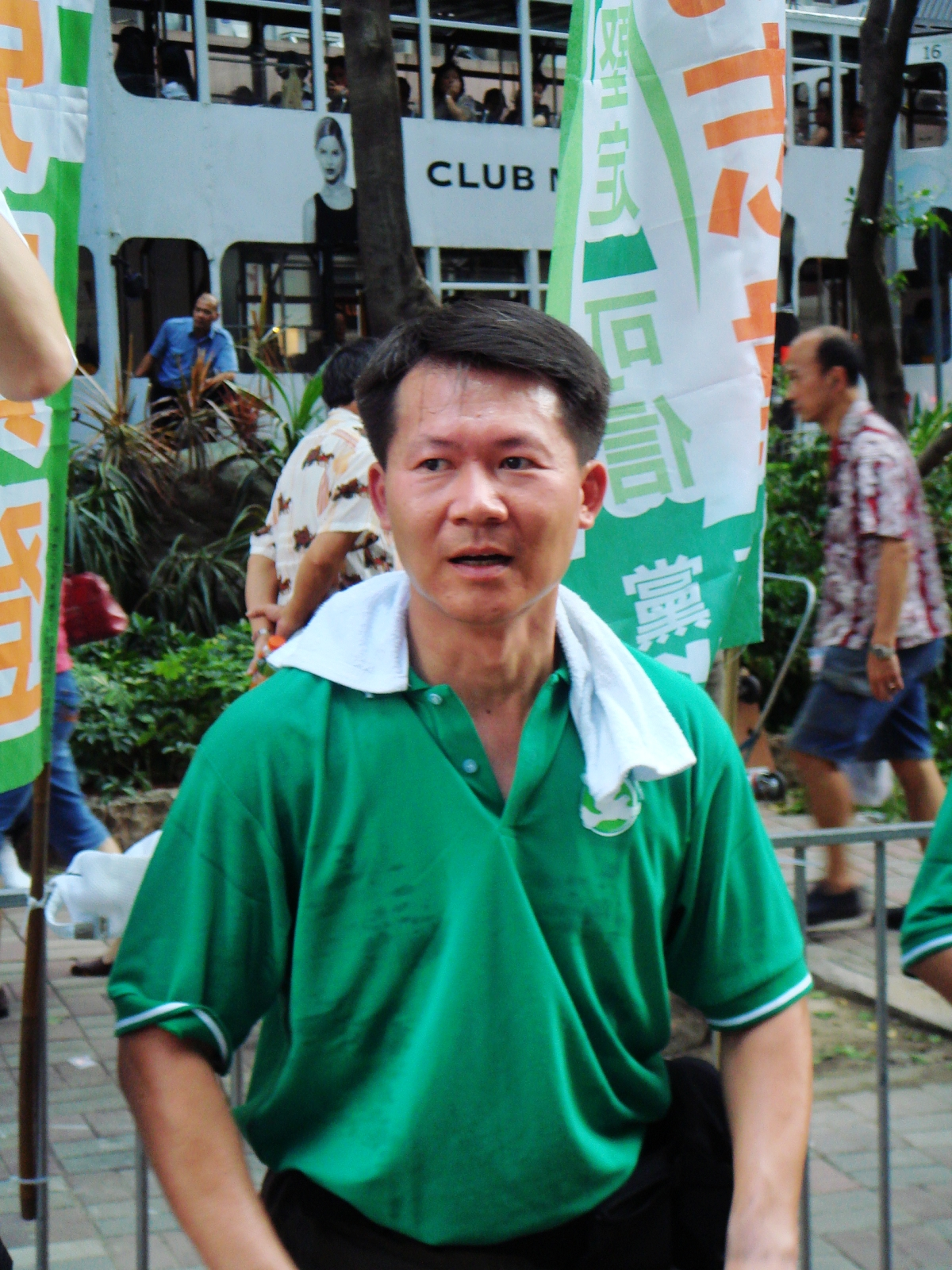

Secretary of the Democratic Party
- In office 13 December 1998 – 17 December 2006
- Preceded by: Law Chi-kwong
- Succeeded by: Pegga Ha
- In office 14 December 2008 – 23 January 2015
- Preceded by: Pegga Ha
- Succeeded by: Li Wing-shing

Treasurer of the Democratic Party
- In office 17 December 2006 – 14 December 2008
- Preceded by: Tsui Hon-kwong
- Succeeded by: Tsui Hon-kwong

Member of the Yuen Long District Board
- In office 1 October 1991 – 30 September 1994
- Preceded by: Zachary Wong; Chung Kwai-ping
- Succeeded by: Constituency abolished
- Constituency: Yuen Long Town West

Member of the Yuen Long District Council
- In office 1 January 2004 – 31 December 2007
- Preceded by: New constituency
- Succeeded by: Constituency abolished
- Constituency: Wang Yat

Personal details
- Born: 1 May 1964 (age 62) British Hong Kong
- Party: United Democrats (1990–94); Democratic Party (1994–2025)

Cheung Yin-tung (Chinese: 張賢登; born 1 May 1964) is a Hong Kong politician. He is the former secretary and treasurer of the Democratic Party and former member of the Yuen Long District Council.

== Biography ==
He was a New Territories indigenous resident born in Yuen Long in 1964. He participated in student activism when he was younger and was chairman of the 32nd standing committee of the Hong Kong Federation of Students (HKFS) and led protests in support of the Tiananmen Square protests of 1989 in Beijing.

After he graduated, he became a teacher. He was invited by Meeting Point and United Democrats of Hong Kong legislator Ng Ming-yum to join the United Democrats, which later transformed into the Democratic Party. He was elected to the Yuen Long District Board in 1991 but was defeated by conservative Leung Che-cheung in Yiu Yau with a large margin in the 1994 re-election. He participated in the 1995 Regional Council election, running against Leung Che-cheung again but lost to Leung in a margin of 70 votes.

In the 2003 District Council election, he won a seat in the Wang Yat constituency, taking the first seat for the Democrats in Tin Shui Wai. In the 2004 Legislative Council election, he ran in the New Territories West with Albert Ho's ticket. Ho eventually won a seat but Cheung was unelected. He ran again in 2008 Legislative Council election, leading the third ticket for the Democratic Party along with Albert Ho and Lee Wing-tat. His ticket received 10,069 votes and was not elected.

He had been the Democratic Party secretary two terms, from 1998 to 2006 and from 2008 to 2014 and also the party treasurer from 2006 to 2008. Most of the Democratic Party leaders were denied access to the Mainland China due to its strained relationship with the Beijing government. As a Democratic Party secretary, Cheung was granted a 10-year Home Entry Permit to attend a course for District Councillors in 2005. He said he would hope there would be more formal liaison with mainland authorities.

He was responsible for the intra-party investigation over the allegation of some senior members were involved in spying activities of China in 2006, being the convenor of the five-member committee.

On 23 January 2015 after the party leadership election, Cheung Yin-tung resigned as secretary and his position on the Central Committee with his disciple Kwong Chun-yu. Some speculated their disaffections towards the dominance of the Mainstreamer faction led by the "triumvirate", Yeung Sum, Cheung Man-kwong and Lee Wing-tat.

Political offices
| Preceded by Zachary Wong; Chung Kwai-ping | Member of the Yuen Long District Board; Representative for Yuen Long Town West; 1991–1994 | Constituency abolished |
| New constituency | Member of the Yuen Long District Council; Representative for Wan Yat; 2004–2007 | Constituency abolished |
Party political offices
| Preceded by Law Chi-kwong | Secretary of the Democratic Party; 1998–2006 | Succeeded by Peggy Ha |
| Preceded by Tsui Hon-kwong | Treasurer of the Democratic Party; 2006–2008 | Succeeded by Tsui Hon-kwong |
| Preceded by Peggy Ha | Secretary of the Democratic Party; 2008–2015 | Succeeded by Li Wing-shing |
