= Yeung Sum =

Hong Kong politician (born 1947)

- 楊森
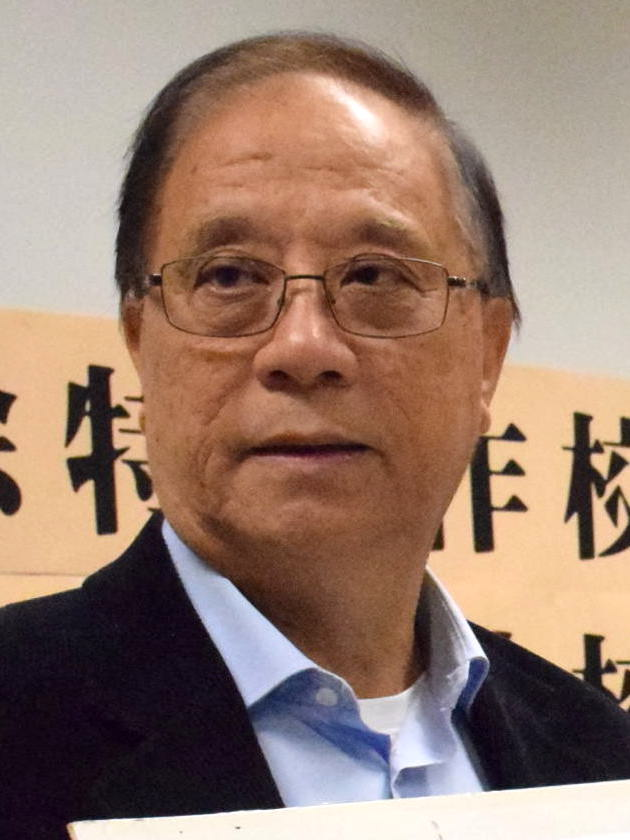
- Yeung Sum in 2015

Member of the Legislative Council
- In office 1 October 1998 – 30 September 2008
- Succeeded by: Kam Nai-wai
- In office 1 October 1991 – 30 June 1997

Chairman of Democratic Party
- In office 2 December 2002 – 12 December 2004
- Preceded by: Martin Lee
- Succeeded by: Lee Wing-tat

Personal details
- Born: 22 November 1947 (age 78) Guangzhou, Guangdong, China
- Party: Meeting Point (1983–94); United Democrats (1990–94); Democratic (1994–2025)
- Education: University of Hong Kong; University of York

Yeung Sum
- Traditional Chinese: 楊森
- Simplified Chinese: 杨森
Transcriptions
Standard Mandarin
- Hanyu Pinyin: Yáng Sēn
Yue: Cantonese
- Yale Romanization: Yèuhng Sām
- Jyutping: Joeng^{4} Sam^{1}

Yeung Sum (Chinese: 楊森; born 22 November 1947 in Guangzhou) is a Hong Kong politician and academic. He served several terms as a Legislative Councillor and was the second chairman of the Democratic Party (DP), a pro-democracy political party in Hong Kong. He is a lecturer at the University of Hong Kong.

== Biography ==
Yeung Sum obtained his undergraduate degree at the University of Hong Kong. He was a residential member in St. John's College and became the president of its student association from 1972–1973. He gained his master's degree at the University of York in Britain before returning to earn his doctorate from the University of Hong Kong. Yeung Sum has taught at the University of Hong Kong since 1979 and has been a lecturer in the Department of Social Work and Social Administration since 1985.

When the issue of Hong Kong sovereignty after 1997 came up in 1983, Yeung and some graduates from the University of Hong Kong founded Meeting Point, the first political organisation supporting Hong Kong's return to Chinese sovereignty. During the drafting of the Hong Kong Basic Law, he pushed for a democratic model for Hong Kong after 1997. He was the second chairman of the group from 1988 to 1989. He also formed the Joint Committee on the Promotion of Democratic Government with liberal-minded drafters Martin Lee and Szeto Wah and became the spokesman of the committee. He was a committee member of the Hong Kong Alliance in Support of Patriotic Democratic Movements in China during the Tiananmen protests of 1989 and remained critical of the Chinese government after the bloody crackdown.

In 1990, he became the founding vice-chairman of the United Democrats of Hong Kong, the first pro-democracy party and filled candidates in the District Board elections and Urban and Regional Councils elections. In the first Legislative Council direct election, he was directly elected through the Island West constituency. He became the vice-chairman of the Democratic Party when the United Democrats and Meeting Point merged in 1994.

Yeung remained legislator until the legislature was dissolved in 1997 when Hong Kong was handed over to China. He was re-elected to the Legislative Council in the 1998 LegCo election and remained in the LegCo until he stepped down as the second place on the party's candidate list in 2008 behind Kam Nai-wai.

Yeung represented the Mainstreamers, a relatively moderate faction, within the democratic camp, and discontent with him within the Democrats led to splits within the party. When Yeung took the chairmanship from Martin Lee in 2002, legislator Albert Chan quit the party, and the following year a number of "Young Turks" left the party to join The Frontier. In 2004, taking responsibility for recent election failures, he announced that he would not seek another term as party chairman. He has remained on the party's central committee and executive committees occasionally.

On 28 February 2020, Yeung was arrested over his involvement in a march on 31 August 2019 which was part of protests sparked by the extradition bill, and had been classified by police as illegal assembly. A few hours later, he was released on bail, as were the other arrestees Jimmy Lai and Lee Cheuk-yan. The cases were scheduled to be heard at Eastern Law Court on 5 May 2020. On 18 April, Yeung was again arrested as one of 15 Hong Kong high-profile democracy figures, on suspicion of organizing, publicizing or taking part in several unauthorized assemblies between August and October 2019 in the course of the anti-extradition bill protests. Following protocol, the police statement did not disclose the names of the accused.

On 10 June 2022, Sum, along the two other pro-democracy figures, had his Silver Bauhinia Star honour removed, and his Justice of the Peace appointment was revoked by the government due to his jail sentences related to anti extradition-bill protests.

== See also ==
- Politics of Hong Kong
- List of graduates of University of Hong Kong

Party political offices
Preceded by Lau Nai-keung	Chairman of Meeting Point; 1988–1989	Succeeded by Anthony Cheung
New political party	Vice Chairperson of United Democrats of Hong Kong; 1990–1994; With: Albert Ho	Merged into Democratic Party
New political party	Vice Chairperson of Democratic Party; 1994–2000	Succeeded by Lee Wing-tat
Preceded by Martin Lee	Chairperson of Democratic Party; 2002–2004	Succeeded by Lee Wing-tat
Legislative Council of Hong Kong
New constituency	Member of Legislative Council; Representative for Hong Kong Island West; 1991–1995; Served alongside: Huang Chen-ya	Succeeded by Himself as Representative for Hong Kong Island South
Preceded by Himself as Representative for Hong Kong Island West	Member of Legislative Council; Representative for Hong Kong Island South; 1995–1997	Replaced by Provisional Legislative Council
New seat	Member of Legislative Council; Representative for Hong Kong Island; 1998–2008	Succeeded by Kam Nai-wai
