= Stanley Ng =

Hong Kong town planner and politician

Stanley Ng Wing-fai
- 吳永輝
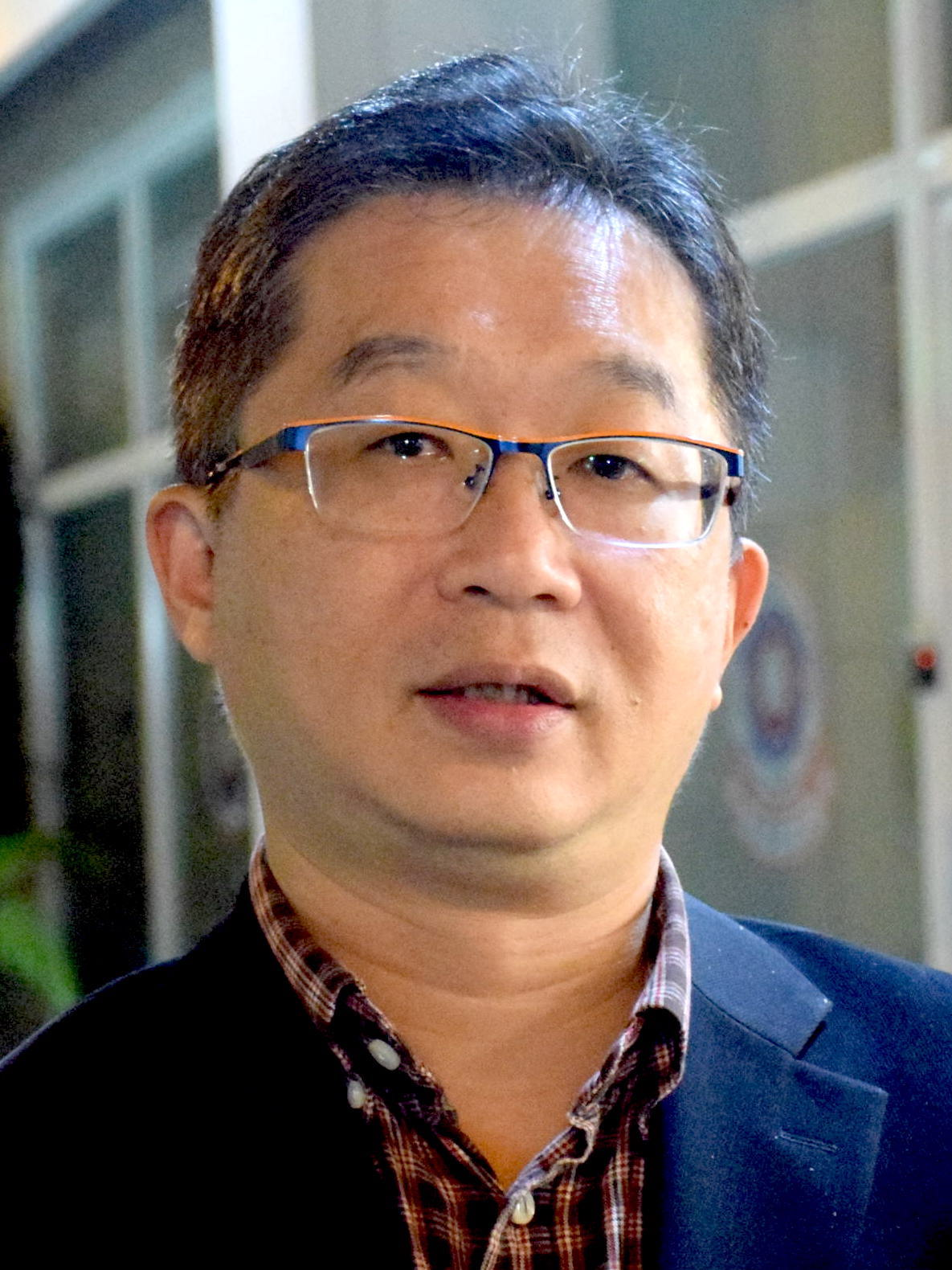

Chairman of the Professional Commons
- In office November 2015 – November 2016
- Preceded by: Charles Mok

Member of the Urban Council
- In office May 1995 – December 1999
- Constituency: Mong Kok

Personal details
- Born: 1961 (age 64–65) British Hong Kong
- Party: Democratic Party
- Other political affiliations: Democrat Professionals Hong Kong
- Education: National Taiwan University (BSc); University of Hong Kong (MSc)
- Occupation: Politician; Town planner CEO, MapKing group

Stanley Ng Wing-fai (Chinese: 吳永輝; born 1961) is a Hong Kong–based smart city expert, a licensed town planner and politician. He is Election Committee Member of Hong Kong (2006 to 2022) and Executive Committee member of the Democratic Party.

== Education and business career ==
Born in 1961 in Hong Kong, Ng studied at the Pui Ching Middle School, and received a bachelor's degree in Civil Engineering from the National Taiwan University in 1983 and a master's degree in Urban Planning from the University of Hong Kong in 1991. He became a licensed Town Planner both in China, Hong Kong and the United Kingdom. And he is a BIM Professional.

He is the founder and CEO of "AI Cities", "MapKing", and "MapAsia", and run the group MapKing International, an international smart city technology and mapping firm in Asia. He is also the Publisher of the World and China Press Limited. and also Founding President of Asia Pacific Connected Vehicles Industry Association.

== Political career ==
He first ran for office in the Yau Tsim Mong District Board in the 1994 District Board elections where he won a seat in Mong Kok North for the Democratic Party. In the 1999 election, he changed his constituency to Tai Nan but was defeated.

He was also among the last members of the Urban Council elected in the 1995 election through Mong Kok. He continued to serve on the Provisional Urban Council after the handover in 1997 until the council was abolished by the then Chief Executive Tung Chee-hwa in 2000.

In 2004, 2008 and 2012, he contested in the Architectural, Surveying and Planning functional constituency which has restricted electorates and was all unelected. He gave way to other democrats Edward Yiu and Paul Zimmerman in subsequent elections in 2016 and 2018. Edward Yiu won but disqualified (DQ) by the authority and Paul Zimmerman lost in by-election.

He was elected in 2006, 2011, 2016 to the Election Committee which is responsible for electing the Chief Executive, through the Architectural, Surveying and Planning sub-sector. He run under Democrat Professionals Hong Kong in 2016 and won.

He has been member of the Central Committee and Executive Committee of the Democratic Party, a pro-democratic party in Hong Kong. He had also served as Treasurer of the party. In the 2014 party leadership election, he ran against incumbent chairwoman Emily Lau but was not elected.

He was Vice Chairman of the pro-democracy think tank Professional Commons until he became the Chairman in November 2015 but he only stayed in office for one year. The successor Paul Zimmerman run by-election of the professional sector after Edward Yiu was disqualified (DQ) in 2017 but was defeated. He was a member of Hong Kong's think tank Citizen's Commission on Constitutional Development which was formed by Anson Chan in 2008.

Political offices
New title	Member of the Yau Tsim Mong District Board; Representative for Mong Kok North; 1994–1999	Succeeded by Ip Shu-on
Party political offices
Preceded by Tsui Hon-kwong	Treasurer of the Democratic Party; 2011–2015	Succeeded by Ramon Yuen
