= New Territories East (1998 constituency) =

Geographical constituency in Hong Kong

- Former Geographical constituency for the Legislative Council of Hong Kong
- Boundary of New Territories East in Hong Kong
- District: North District; Tai Po District; Sai Kung District; Sha Tin District
- Region: New Territories
- Population: 1,824,600 (2020)
- Electorate: 1,139,616 (2020)

Former constituency
- Created: 1998
- Abolished: 2021
- Number of members: Five (1998–2000); Seven (2004–2012); Nine (2012–2021)
- Created from: New Territories East (1995), New Territories North (1995), New Territories North-east (1995); New Territories South-east (1995)
- Replaced by: New Territories North (2021), New Territories North East (2021), New Territories South East (2021)

The New Territories East geographical constituency was one of the five geographical constituencies in the Legislative Council of Hong Kong. It was established in 1998 for the first SAR Legislative Council election and was abolished under the 2021 overhaul of the Hong Kong electoral system. It encompassed Sha Tin District, Tai Po District, North District and Sai Kung District. In the 2016 Legislative Council election, nine members of the Legislative Council using the Hare quota of party-list proportional representation with 1,139,616 electorates in 2020.

== History ==
The single-constituency single-vote system was replaced by the party-list proportional representation system for the first SAR Legislative Council election designed by Beijing to reward the weaker pro-Beijing candidates and dilute the electoral strength of the majority pro-democrats. Five seats were allocated to New Territories East, where popular democrat legislator Emily Lau of The Frontier topped the poll by winning more than 30 per cent of the popular vote with Cyd Ho also being elected. Although relatively weak in the region, the pro-democracy Democratic Party's Andrew Cheng also won a seat, while the pro-Beijing Democratic Alliance for the Betterment of Hong Kong (DAB) Lau Kong-wah whose Civil Force (CF) had a strong presence in Sha Tin District, also won a seat. The last seat was taken by former Legislative Council President Andrew Wong, beating pro-business Liberal Party chairman Allen Lee.

In the 2000 Legislative Council election, Cyd Ho switched to Hong Kong Island. Her vacancy was taken up by Democrat Wong Sing-chi who led a separate ticket targeting North District and Tai Po District, while Andrew Cheng targeted Sha Tin District and Sai Kung District. Two extra seats were added to New Territories East in 2004 election, in which the pro-democrats formed a star-dubbed "7.1 United Front" ticket which aimed at winning five seats riding on the pro-democracy wave from the 2003 mass demonstration. However only the first three candidates, Andrew Cheng, Emily Lau and Ronny Tong were elected, while the fourth candidate Wong Sing-chi was ousted. The DAB ticket also won two seats with Li Kwok-ying of the rural background also won a new seat. James Tien of the Liberal Party who was at the peak of his popularity from his opposition to the Basic Law Article 23 legislation contested in the constituency for the first time, while socialist activist "Long Hair" Leung Kwok-hung won the last seat, unexpectedly ousting Andrew Wong.

James Tien lost his re-election in the 2008 Legislative Council election as the Liberal Party's popularity declined, and was replaced by Wong Sing-chi. Leung Kwok-hung of the League of Social Democrats (LSD) rose to the top of the poll among the pro-democrats and Emily Lau dropped to the last. Lau decided to merge the Frontier into the Democratic Party after the party and became its vice chairwoman. In 2010 Leung Kwok-hung resigned from his office to trigger a by-election as part of the de facto "Five Constituencies Referendum" to pressure the government on the 2012 constitutional reform package. Leung was re-elected with a low turnout due to the government and pro-Beijing boycott, while Emily Lau's Democratic Party brokered a compromise with the Beijing authorities over the reform proposal, which increased the seats of the Legislative Council from 30 to 35, making the number of the seats in New Territories East from seven to nine.

In the 2012 Legislative Council election, the Democrats put forward an offensive strategy by fielding three tickets hoping to retain their current three seats. However with the radical democrats' ferocious attacks on their compromised position on the electoral reform, the Democrats retained only Emily Lau's seat while People Power's Raymond Chan and Neo Democrats' Gary Fan who quit the Democratic Party each won a seat. The DAB retained their two seats by splitting their ticket into two, each led by Chan Hak-kan and Elizabeth Quat. Fernando Cheung of the Labour Party and James Tien of the Liberal Party also returned to the Legislative Council through New Territories East.

Over the debate on the 2016/2017 constitutional reform proposal, Civic Party moderate Ronny Tong resigned over his difference with the party and triggered a February 2016 by-election. Although Civic Alvin Yeung defeated DAB's Holden Chow, Edward Leung of the pro-independence Hong Kong Indigenous (HKI) received a better-than-expected results which boosted the localist camp morale. Edward Leung was later on barred from running in the September 2016 general election an instead supported Youngspiration's Baggio Leung who was elected. While Lam Cheuk-ting succeeded Emily Lau who was retiring, New People's Party's Eunice Yung who was supported by Civil Force ousted Gary Fan.

Baggio Leung was soon disqualified from the office due to his oath-taking controversy, followed by Leung Kwok-hung who was also disqualified for his oath-taking manner. A by-election was held in March 2018, where Gary Fan made a comeback by defeating Tang Ka-piu of the pro-Beijing Hong Kong Federation of Trade Unions (FTU). However, Fan was later unseated by the court in December 2019, as the court viewed pro-independence candidate Ventus Lau's disqualification in the by-election was unlawful.

== Returned members ==
Below are all the members returned for the New Territories East constituency since its creation. The number of seats increased from five to nine between 1998 and 2016.

LegCo members for New Territories East, 1998–2021
Term	Election	Member	Member	Member	Member	Member	Member	Member	Member	Member
1st	1998	Emily Lau (TF→DP)	Andrew Cheng (DP→Ind)	Lau Kong-wah (DAB/CF)	Cyd Ho (TF)	Andrew Wong (Ind)				
2nd	2000	Emily Lau (TF→DP)	Andrew Cheng (DP→Ind)	Lau Kong-wah (DAB/CF)	Wong Sing-chi (DP)	Andrew Wong (Ind)				
3rd	2004	Emily Lau (TF→DP)	Andrew Cheng (DP→Ind)	Lau Kong-wah (DAB/CF)	Ronny Tong (A45→CP→Ind)	Leung Kwok-hung (AFA→LSD)	James Tien (LP)	Li Kwok-ying (DAB)		
4th	2008	Emily Lau (TF→DP)	Andrew Cheng (DP→Ind)	Lau Kong-wah (DAB/CF)	Ronny Tong (A45→CP→Ind)	Leung Kwok-hung (AFA→LSD)	Wong Sing-chi (DP)	Chan Hak-kan (DAB/NTAS)		
4th	2008	Emily Lau (TF→DP)	Andrew Cheng (DP→Ind)	Lau Kong-wah (DAB/CF)	Ronny Tong (A45→CP→Ind)	Vacant	Wong Sing-chi (DP)	Chan Hak-kan (DAB/NTAS)		
4th	2010 (b)	Emily Lau (TF→DP)	Andrew Cheng (DP→Ind)	Lau Kong-wah (DAB/CF)	Ronny Tong (A45→CP→Ind)	Leung Kwok-hung (LSD)	Wong Sing-chi (DP)	Chan Hak-kan (DAB/NTAS)		
5th	2012	Emily Lau (TF→DP)	Fernando Cheung (Lab)	Elizabeth Quat (DAB)	Ronny Tong (A45→CP→Ind)	Leung Kwok-hung (LSD)	Chan Chi-chuen (PP)	Chan Hak-kan (DAB/NTAS)	James Tien (LP)	Gary Fan (ND)
5th	2016 (b)	Emily Lau (TF→DP)	Fernando Cheung (Lab)	Elizabeth Quat (DAB)	Alvin Yeung (CP)	Leung Kwok-hung (LSD)	Chan Chi-chuen (PP)	Chan Hak-kan (DAB/NTAS)	James Tien (LP)	Gary Fan (ND)
6th	2016	Lam Cheuk-ting (DP)	Fernando Cheung (Lab)	Elizabeth Quat (DAB)	Alvin Yeung (CP)	Leung Kwok-hung (LSD)	Chan Chi-chuen (PP)	Chan Hak-kan (DAB/NTAS)	Yung Hoi-yan (NPP)	Sixtus Leung (Youngspiration)
6th	2018 (b)	Lam Cheuk-ting (DP)	Fernando Cheung (Lab)	Elizabeth Quat (DAB)	Alvin Yeung (CP)	Vacant	Chan Chi-chuen (PP)	Chan Hak-kan (DAB/NTAS)	Yung Hoi-yan (NPP)	Gary Fan (ND)
6th	2018 (b)	Lam Cheuk-ting (DP)	Fernando Cheung (Lab)	Elizabeth Quat (DAB)	Alvin Yeung (CP)	Vacant	Chan Chi-chuen (PP)	Chan Hak-kan (DAB/NTAS)	Yung Hoi-yan (NPP)	Vacant
6th	2018 (b)	Lam Cheuk-ting (DP)	Fernando Cheung (Lab)	Elizabeth Quat (DAB)	Vacant	Vacant	Chan Chi-chuen (PP)	Chan Hak-kan (DAB/NTAS)	Yung Hoi-yan (NPP)	Vacant
6th	2018 (b)	Vacant	Vacant	Elizabeth Quat (DAB)	Vacant	Vacant	Vacant	Chan Hak-kan (DAB/NTAS)	Yung Hoi-yan (NPP)	Vacant

=== Summary of seats won ===
Term	Election	Distribution
1st	1998	4 / 1
2nd	2000	4 / 1
3rd	2004	4 / 3
4th	2008	5 / 2
5th	2012	6 / 3
6th	2016	6 / 3

	1998	2000	2004	2008	2012	2016
Frontier	2	1	1	1		
Democratic	1	2	1	2	1	1
DAB	1	1	2	2	2	2
Liberal			1		1	
April Fifth Action			1			
LSD				1	1	1
Civic				1	1	1
Labour					1	1
People Power					1	1
Neo Democrats					1	
Youngspiration						1
NPP						1
Independent	1	1	1			
Pro-democracy	4	4	4	5	6	6
Pro-Beijing	1	1	3	2	3	3
Seats	5	5	7	7	9	9

=== Vote share summary ===
	1998	2000	2004	2008	2012	2016
Frontier	30.8	20.6	11.2	9.2		
Democratic	25.6	24.4	16.8	23.8	14.7	6.8
DAB	17.2	21.8	22.1	28.4	18.2	18.5
Liberal	10.3	5.0	15.9	8.0	6.7	3.5
Citizens	0.7					
April Fifth Action		5.9	14.1			
HKPA		2.9	3.3			
New Forum		2.2				
CTU			5.6			
LSD				12.4	10.4	6.1
Civic				11.1	7.1	9.0
Labour					9.5	8.6
People Power					8.2	7.9
Neo Democrats					6.2	5.4
FTU					5.3	4.6
Civil Force					5.2	
Economic Synergy					1.2	
Youngspiration						6.6
NPP						6.2
HKRO						4.1
PoD						1.4
Independent and Others	15.4	17.1	11.0	7.1	7.9	11.3
Pro-democracy	70.6	65.6	58.7	56.5	57.4	57.9
Pro-Beijing	29.4	34.4	41.3	42.1	42.4	34.6

== Election results ==
The largest remainder method (with Hare quota) of the proportional representative electoral system was introduced in 1998, replacing the single-member constituencies of the 1995 election. Elected candidates are shown in bold. Brackets indicate the quota + remainder.

=== 2010s ===
2018 New Territories East by-election
Party	Candidate	Votes	%	±%
**Neo Democrats**	**Gary Fan Kwok-wai**	**183,762**	**44.57**	
FTU (DAB)	Tang Ka-piu	152,904	37.08	
Livelihood First	Christine Fong Kwok-shan	64,905	15.74	
Independent	Wong Sing-chi	6,182	1.50	
Nonpartisan	Joyce Chiu Pui-yuk	3,068	0.74	
Independent	Estella Chan Yuet-ngor	1,504	0.36	
Majority		30,858	7.49	
Total valid votes		412,325	100.00	
Rejected ballots		4,363		
Turnout		416,688	42.13	
Registered electors		988,986		
Neo Democrats **gain** from Youngspiration		Swing		

↓
**1**	**1**	**1**	**1**	**1**	**1**	**1**	**2**

Vote share
1. DAB (18.5%)
2. Civic (9.03%)
3. Labour (8.58%)
4. People Power (7.92%)
5. Democratic (6.77%)
6. Youngspiration (6.55%)
7. NPP/CF (6.23%)
8. LSD (6.13%)
9. Neo Democrats (5.44%)
10. FTU (4.64%)
11. HKRO/CP (4.07%)
12. Liberal (3.45%)
13. Path of Democracy (1.39%)
14. Other (11.3%)

2016 Legislative Council election: New Territories East
List	Candidates	Votes	Of total (%)	± from prev.
**Quota**		64,503	11.11	
DAB	**Elizabeth Quat** Kenny Chong Yuen-tung, Tung Kin-lei, Chan Pok-chi, Alvin Chiu Man-leong, Philip Li Ka-leung, Wan Kai-ming, Ada Lo Tai-suen, Alf Wong Chi-yung	58,825	10.13	+0.20
Civic	**Alvin Yeung Ngok-kiu**	52,416	9.03	+1.98
Labour	**Cheung Chiu-hung** Kwok Wing-kin	49,800	8.58	+0.03
DAB (NTAS)	**Chan Hak-kan** Clement Woo Kin-man, Jiff Yiu Ming, Peggy Wong Pik-kiu, Larm Wai-leung, Tsang Hing-lung, Mui Siu-fung, Hau Hon-shek	48,720	8.39	–0.43
People Power	**Raymond Chan Chi-chuen**	45,993	7.92	–0.27
Democratic	**Lam Cheuk-ting** Emily Lau Wai-hing, Ting Tsz-yuen, Ng Kam-hung, Lo Ying-cheung	39,327	6.77	–7.90
Youngspiration (Nonpartisan)	**Sixtus Leung Chung-hang** Li Tung-sing	37,997	6.55	N/A
NPP (Civil Force)	**Yung Hoi-yan** Stanley Lanny Tam, Victor Leung Ka-fai, Chan Man-kuen, Tong Hok-leung, James Yip Chi-ho, Michael Liu Tsz-chung	36,183	6.23	+1.07
LSD	**Leung Kwok-hung**	35,595	6.13	–4.26
Independent	Christine Fong Kwok-shan	34,544	5.95	+0.66
Neo Democrats	Gary Fan Kwok-wai, Yam Kai-bong, Leung Li, Chung Kam-lun, Chan Wai-tat, Li Sai-hung, Chow Yuen-wai, Lui Man-kwong	31,595	5.44	–0.72
FTU	Tang Ka-piu, Tam Kam-lin, Kent Tsang King-chung	26,931	4.64	–0.62
HKRO (Civic Passion)	Chin Wan-kan, Marco Lee Kwok-hei	23,635	4.07	N/A
Liberal	Dominic Lee Tsz-king, James Tien Pei-chun	20,031	3.45	–3.22
Independent	Andrew Cheng Kar-foo	17,892	3.08	N/A
PoD	Raymond Mak Ka-chun	8,084	1.39	N/A
Nonpartisan	Hau Chi-keung, Wong Shui-sang, Pang Wang-kin, Yip Wah-ching	6,720	1.16	N/A
Justice Alliance	Leticia Lee See-yin	2,938	0.51	N/A
Independent	Wong Sum-yu	1,657	0.29	N/A
Nonpartisan	Marcus Liu Tin-shing, Ben Kuen Ping-yiu, Li Wai	850	0.15	N/A
Nonpartisan	Estella Chan Yuk-ngor	486	0.08	N/A
Nonpartisan	Clarence Ronald Leung Kam-shing, Yau Man-king	305	0.05	N/A
Total valid votes		580,524	100.00	
Rejected ballots		6,867		
Turnout		587,391	60.24	+6.38
Registered electors		975,071		

2016 New Territories East by-election
Party	Candidate	Votes	%	±%
**Civic**	**Alvin Yeung Ngok-kiu**	**160,880**	**37.19**	
DAB	Holden Chow Ho-ding	150,329	34.75	
Indigenous	Edward Leung Tin-kei	66,524	15.38	
Independent	Christine Fong Kwok-shan	33,424	7.73	
Third Side	Wong Sing-chi	17,295	4.00	
Nonpartisan	Lau Chi-shing	2,271	0.52	
Independent	Albert Leung Sze-ho	1,858	0.43	
Majority		10,551	2.44	
Total valid votes		432,581	100.00	
Rejected ballots		1,639		
Turnout		434,220	46.18	
Registered electors		940,340		
Civic **gain** from Nonpartisan		Swing		

↓
**1**	**1**	**1**	**1**	**1**	**1**	**1**	**2**

Vote share
1. DAB (18.8%)
2. Democratic (14.7%)
3. LSD (10.4%)
4. Labour (8.53%)
5. People Power (8.19%)
6. Civic (7.05%)
7. Liberal (6.67%)
8. Neo Democrats (6.16%)
9. FTU (5.26%)
10. Civil Force (5.16%)
11. Economic Synergy (1.23%)
12. Other (7.94%)

2012 Legislative Council election: New Territories East
List	Candidates	Votes	Of total (%)	± from prev.
**Quota**		51,638	11.11	
LSD	**Leung Kwok-hung**	48,295	10.39	−2.01
DAB	**Elizabeth Quat** Chong Yuen-tung, Li Sai-wing, Philip Li Ka-leung, Tung Kin-lei, Ki Lai-mei, Wong Ping-fan	46,139	9.93	N/A
DAB	**Chan Hak-kan** Lau Kwok-fan, Wong Pik-kiu, Larm Wai-leung, Clement Woo Kin-man, Yiu Ming	40,977	8.82	−19.58
Labour	**Cheung Chiu-hung** Kwok Wing-kin	39,650	8.53	N/A
People Power (Frontier)	**Raymond Chan Chi-chuen** Erica Yuen Mi-ming	38,042	8.19	N/A
Democratic	**Emily Lau Wai-hing** Ricky Or Yiu-lam, Frankie Lam Siu-ching, Lam Wing-yin	37,039	7.97	−1.23
Civic	**Ronny Tong Ka-wah** Alvin Yeung Ngok-kiu	32,753	7.05	−4.05
Liberal	**James Tien Pei-chun** Selina Chow Liang Shuk-yee, Leung Chi-wai, Liu Kwok-wah	31,016	6.67	−1.33
Neo Democrats	**Gary Fan Kwok-wai** Yam Kai-bong, Leung Li, Leung Wing-hung, Kwan Wing-yip, Yau Man-chun, Chung Kam-lun, Cheung Kwok-keung, Michael Yung Ming-chau	28,621	6.16	N/A
Independent	Christine Fong Kwok-shan	24,594	5.29	N/A
FTU	Ip Wai-ming, Wong Wang-to, Ching Ngon-lai, Kan Siu-kei, Kent Tsang King-chung, Cheung Kwok-wo	24,458	5.26	N/A
Civil Force (New Forum)	Scarlett Pong Oi-lan, Lanny Tam, Law Kwong-keung, Chan Kwok-tim, So Chun-man, Lam Chung-yan, Victor Leung Ka-fai, Chan Man-kuen, Tang Wing-cheong	23,988	5.16	−0.54
Democratic	Wong Sing-chi, Law Sai-yan	21,118	4.54	−7.66
Democratic	Richard Tsoi Yiu-cheong, Au Chun-wah, Mak Yun-pui, Kwong Mei-na	10,028	2.16	N/A
Nonpartisan	Pong Yat-ming	6,031	1.30	N/A
Economic Synergy	Yau Wing-kwong, Tong Po-chun, Chan Cho-leung, Pang Shu-wan, Lau Wai-lun, Shing Kwok-chu, Man Chen-fai, Tang Kwong-wing, Lok Shui-sang	5,717	1.23	N/A
Independent	Raymond Ho Man-kit	2,875	0.62	N/A
Nonpartisan	Chan Kwok-keung	2,327	0.50	N/A
Independent	Angel Leung On-kay	1,077	0.23	N/A
Total valid votes		464,745	100.00	
Rejected ballots		6,325		
Turnout		471,070	53.86	+9.61
Registered electors		874,694		

2010 New Territories East by-election
Party	Candidate	Votes	%	±%
**LSD**	**Leung Kwok-hung**	**108,927**	**79.93**	
Tertiary 2012	Crystal Chow Ching	17,260	12.67	
Nonpartisan	James Chan Kwok-keung	7,310	5.36	
Nonpartisan	Wu Sai-chuen	2,783	2.04	
Majority		91,667	67.26	
Total valid votes		136,280	100.00	
Rejected ballots		5,952		
Turnout		142,232	17.23	
Registered electors		825,538		
LSD **hold**		Swing		

=== 2000s ===

↓
**1**	**1**	**1**	**2**	**2**

Vote share
1. DAB (28.4%)
2. Democratic (23.8%)
3. LSD (12.4%)
4. Civic (11.1%)
5. Frontier (9.20%)
6. Liberal (8.00%)
7. Other (7.10%)

2008 Legislative Council election: New Territories East
List	Candidates	Votes	Of total (%)	± from prev.
**Quota**		51,561	14.29	
DAB	**Lau Kong-wah, Chan Hak-kan** Mok Kam-kwai, Wong Pik-kiu, Chan Kwok-kai, Lau Kwok-fan, Calvin Lin Chor-keung	102,434	28.38 (14.29+14.09)	+6.26
LSD	**Leung Kwok-hung**	44,763	12.40	−1.74
Democratic	**Wong Sing-chi** Mok Siu-lun	44,174	12.24	N/A
Democratic	**Andrew Cheng Kar-foo** Yam Kai-bong, Shirley Ho Suk-ping, Leung Li, Kwan Wing-yip, Michael Yung Ming-chau, Frankie Lam Siu-chung	41,931	11.62	N/A
Civic	**Ronny Tong Ka-wah** Tsang Kwok-fung, Tsang Kin-chiu	39,957	11.07	N/A
Frontier	**Emily Lau Wai-hing** Ricky Or Yiu-lam	33,205	9.20	N/A
Liberal	James Tien Pei-chun, Terry Kan Wing-fai, Christine Fong Kwok-shan	28,875	8.00	−7.91
Independent	Scarlett Pong Oi-lan	20,455	5.67	N/A
Nonpartisan	Alvin Lee Chi-wing	4,007	1.11	N/A
Party for Civil Rights and Livelihood	Siu See-kong, David Yung Chiu-wing	1,129	0.31	N/A
Total valid votes		360,930	100.00	
Rejected ballots		2,029		
Turnout		362,959	44.25	–12.17
Registered electors		820,205		

↓
**1**	**1**	**1**	**1**	**1**	**2**

Vote share
1. 7.1 United Front (39.2%)
2. DAB (22.1%)
3. Liberal (15.9%)
4. April Fifth Action (14.1%)
5. Progressive Alliance (3.30%)
6. Other (5.40%)

2004 Legislative Council election: New Territories East
List	Candidates	Votes	Of total (%)	± from prev.
**Quota**		61,572	14.29	
7.1 United Front	**Andrew Cheng Kar-foo, Emily Lau Wai-hing, Ronny Tong Ka-wah** Wong Sing-chi, Richard Tsoi Yiu-cheong, Shirley Ho Suk-ping, Ricky Or Yiu-lam	168,833	39.17 (14.29+14.29+10.59)	N/A
DAB	**Lau Kong-wah, Li Kwok-ying** Mok Kam-kwai, Chan Kwok-tai, So Sai-chi, Wong Pik-kiu, Chan Hak-kan	95,434	22.14 (14.29+7.85)	+0.39
Liberal	**James Tien Pei-chun**	68,560	15.91	+10.89
April Fifth Action	**Leung Kwok-hung**	60,925	14.14	+8.22
Nonpartisan	Andrew Wong Wang-fat	23,081	5.36	−10.64
HKPA	Tso Wung-wai	14,174	3.29	+0.42
Total valid votes		431,007	100.00	
Rejected ballots		3,745		
Turnout		434,752	56.42	+11.64
Registered electors		770,590		

↓
**1**	**2**	**1**	**1**

Vote share
1. Democratic (24.4%)
2. DAB (21.6%)
3. Frontier (20.7%)
4. April Fifth Action (5.90%)
5. Liberal (5.00%)
6. Progressive Alliance (2.90%)
7. New Forum (2.20%)
8. Other (17.3%)

2000 Legislative Council election: New Territories East
List	Candidates	Votes	Of total (%)	± from prev.
**Quota**		61,567	20.00	
DAB	**Lau Kong-wah** Wan Yuet-kau, Wong Mo-tai, Wan Chung-ping, Li Kwok-ying	66,943	21.75 (20.00+1.75)	+4.58
Frontier	**Emily Lau Wai-hing** Richard Tsoi Yiu-cheong	63,541	20.64 (20.00+0.64)	−10.17
Democratic	**Andrew Cheng Kar-foo** Gary Fan Kwok-wai, Shirley Ho Suk-ping, Leung Wing-hung, Kwan Wing-yip	49,242	16.00	N/A
Nonpartisan	**Andrew Wong Wang-fat**	44,899	14.59	+1.16
Democratic	**Wong Sing-chi** Chow Wai-tung, Wong Leung-hi	25,971	8.44	N/A
April Fifth Action	Leung Kwok-hung	18,235	5.92	N/A
Liberal	Lau Hing-kee, Leung Chi-wai, Susana Ho Shu-tee	15,450	5.02	−5.23
HKPA	Choy Kan-pui, Ling Man-hoi, Cheng Chun-wo, Ho Sau-mo	8,835	2.87	N/A
Nonpartisan	Brian Kan Ping-chee	7,945	2.58	+0.57
New Forum	Law Cheung-kwok	6,774	2.20	N/A
Total valid votes		307,835	100.00	
Rejected ballots		2,112		
Turnout		309,947	44.78	–11.1
Registered electors		692,164		

=== 1990s ===
↓
**2**	**1**	**1**	**1**

Vote share
1. Frontier (30.8%)
2. Democratic (25.6%)
3. DAB (17.2%)
4. Liberal (10.3%)
5. Citizens (0.70%)
6. Other (15.4%)

1998 Legislative Council election: New Territories East
List	Candidates	Votes	Of total (%)	± from prev.
**Quota**		66,087	20.00	
Frontier	**Emily Lau Wai-hing, Cyd Ho Sau-lan**	101,811	30.81 (20.00+10.81)	
Democratic	**Andrew Cheng Kar-foo** Wong Sing-chi, Lam Wing-yin, Ho Suk-ping	84,629	25.61 (20.00+5.61)	
DAB	**Lau Kong-wah** Cheung Hon-chung, Chan Ping, Wan Yuet-kau, Wong Mo-tai	56,731	17.17	
Independent	**Andrew Wong Wang-fat**	44,386	13.43	
Liberal	Allen Lee Peng-fei, Wong Yiu-chee, Cheng Chee-kwok	33,858	10.25	
Nonpartisan	Brian Kan Ping-chee	6,637	2.01	
Citizens	Lui Yat-ming	2,302	0.72	
Total valid votes		330,434	100.00	
Rejected ballots		2,260		
Turnout		332,694	55.88	
Registered electors		595,340		

== See also ==
- List of constituencies of Hong Kong
