= 1998 Hong Kong legislative election in New Territories East =

- 24 May 1998

All 5 New Territories East seats to the Legislative Council
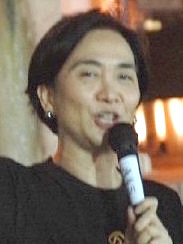

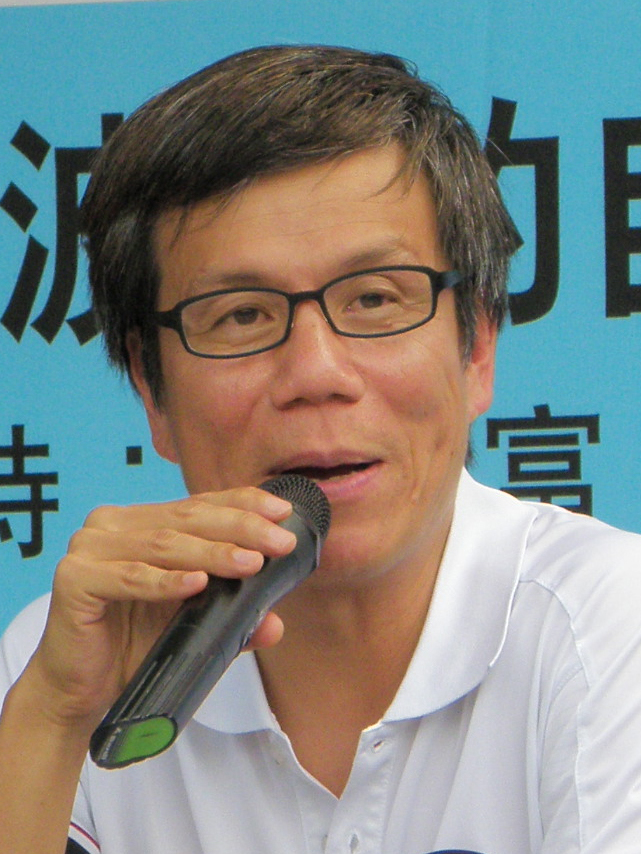

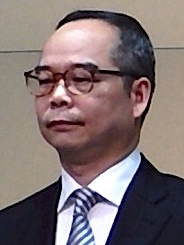
	First party	Second party
Leader	Emily Lau	Andrew Cheng
Party	Frontier	Democratic
Alliance	Pro-democracy	Pro-democracy
Seats won	2	1
Popular vote	101,811	84,629
Percentage	30.8%	25.6%
	Third party	Fourth party
Leader	Lau Kong-wah	Andrew Wong
Party	DAB	Independent
Alliance	Pro-Beijing	Pro-democracy
Seats won	1	1
Popular vote	56,731	44,386
Percentage	17.2%	13.4%

These are the New Territories East results of the 1998 Hong Kong legislative election. The election was held on 24 May 1998 and all 5 seats in newly established constituency New Territories East where consisted of North District, Tai Po District, Sai Kung District and Sha Tin District were contested. The Frontier became the largest victors by winning two seats with Emily Lau and Cyd Ho, which was followed by the Democratic Party's Andrew Cheng. The Democratic Alliance for the Betterment of Hong Kong also won a seat with Lau Kong-wah and independent Andrew Wong won the last seat, defeating Liberal Party chairman Allen Lee.

== Overall results ==
After election:

↓
4	1
Pro-democracy	Pro-Beijing

Party	Seats	Contesting list(s)	Votes	%
Frontier	2	1	101,811	30.8
Democratic	1	1	84,629	25.6
Citizens	0	1	84,629	0.7
Independent	1	1	44,386	13.4
Pro-democracy camp	4	4	233128	70.6
DAB	1	1	56,731	17.2
Liberal	0	1	33,858	10.3
Independent	0	1	6,637	2.0
Pro-Beijing camp	1	3	97,226	29.4
Turnout:			330,434	55.9

== Candidates list ==
Legislative Election 1998: New Territories East
List	Candidates	Votes	Of total (%)	± from prev.
Frontier	Emily Lau Wai-hing, Cyd Ho Sau-lan	101,811	30.81 (20+10.81)	
Democratic	Andrew Cheng Kar-foo Wong Sing-chi, Lam Wing-yin, Ho Suk-ping	84,629	25.61 (20+5.61)	
DAB	Lau Kong-wah Cheung Hon-chung, Chan Ping, Wan Yuet-kau, Wong Mo-tai	56,731	17.17	
Independent	Andrew Wong Wang-fat	44,386	13.43	
Liberal	Allen Lee Peng-fei, Wong Yiu-chee, Cheng Chee-kwok	33,858	10.25	
Nonpartisan	Brian Kan Ping-chee	6,637	2.01	
Citizens	Lui Yat-ming	2,302	0.72	
Turnout		330,434	55.88	
Total valid votes		330,434	100.00	
Rejected ballots		2,260		
Turnout		332,694	55.88	
Registered electors		595,340		

== See also ==
- Legislative Council of Hong Kong
- Hong Kong legislative elections
- 1998 Hong Kong legislative election
