= 1998 Hong Kong legislative election in Hong Kong Island =

- 24 May 1998

All 4 Hong Kong Island seats to the Legislative Council
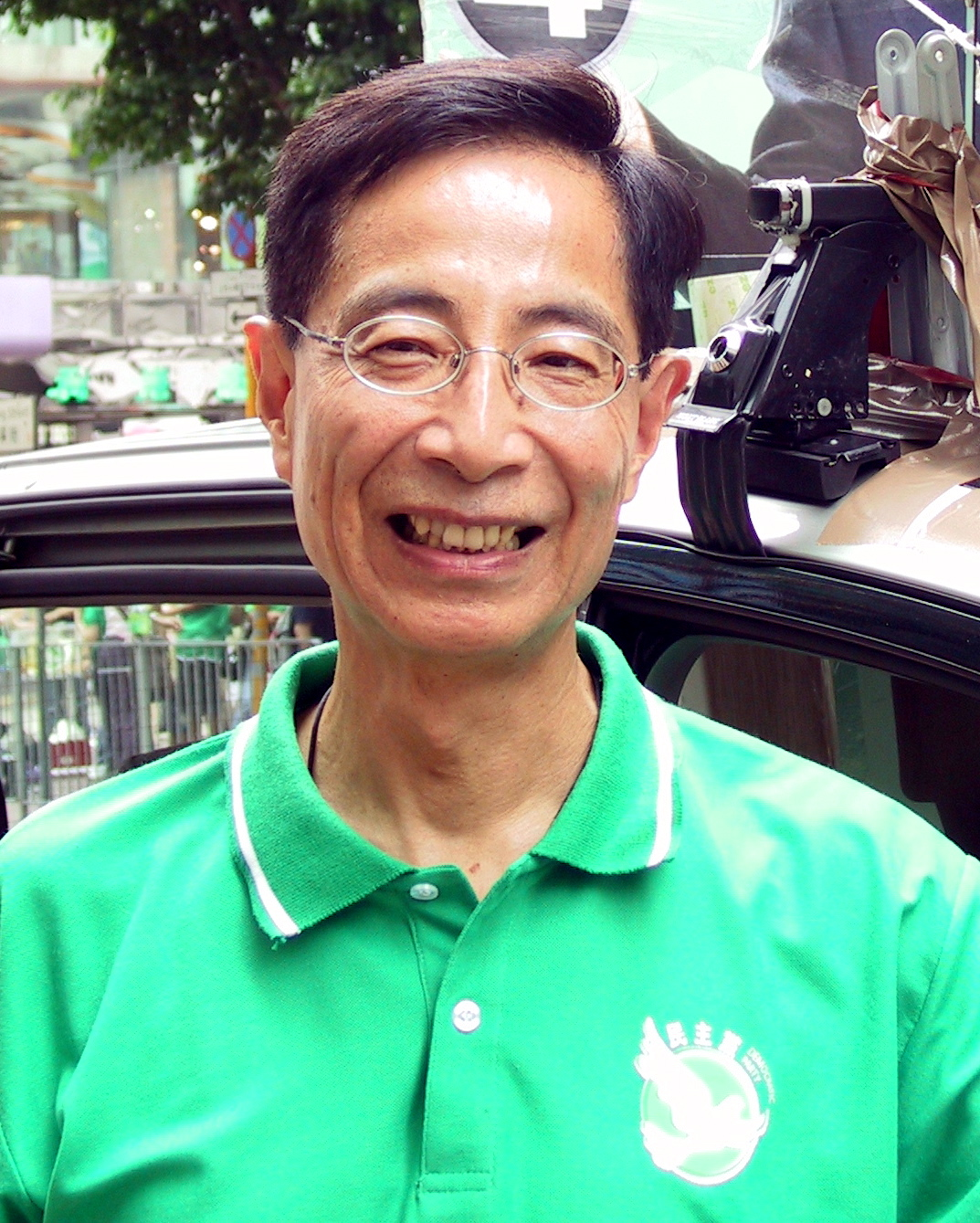

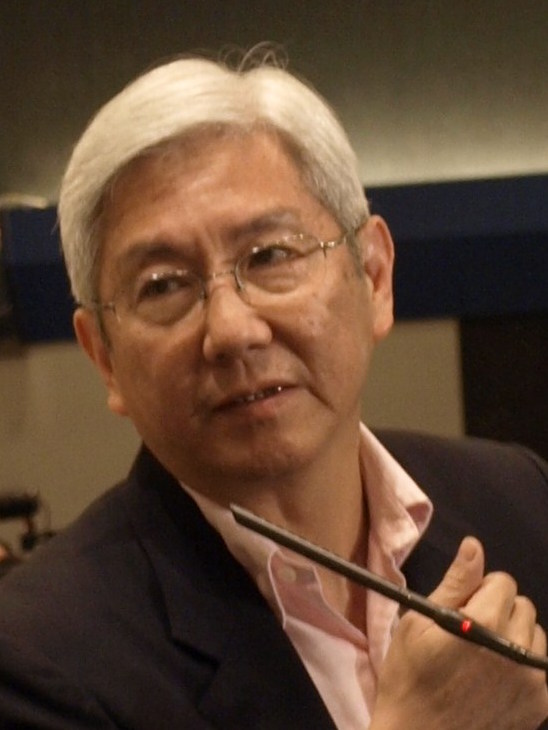

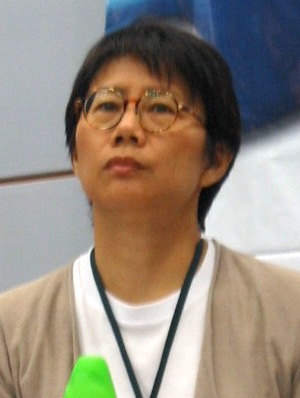
	First party	Second party	Third party
Leader	Martin Lee	Cheng Kai-nam	Christine Loh
Party	Democratic	DAB	Citizens
Alliance	Pro-democracy camp	Pro-Beijing	Pro-democracy camp
Seats won	2	1	1
Popular vote	143,843	90,182	39,251
Percentage	46.8%	29.3%	12.8%

These are the Hong Kong Island results of the 1998 Hong Kong legislative election. The election was held on 24 May 1998 and all 4 seats in the newly established Hong Kong Island geographical constituency were contested. The Democratic Party became the biggest winner by taking two seats with Martin Lee and Yeung Sum elected, which followed by Democratic Alliance for the Betterment of Hong Kong's (DAB) Cheng Kai-nam and Citizens Party's Christine Loh.

== Overall results ==
After election:

↓
3	1
Pro-democracy	Pro-Beijing

Party	Seats	Contesting list(s)	Votes	%
Democratic	2	1	143,843	46.8
Citizens	1	1	39,251	12.8
Independent	0	1	12,377	4.0
Pro-democracy camp	3	3	195,471	63.5
DAB	1	1	90,182	29.3
Liberal	0	1	7,845	2.4
Independent	0	2	13,538	4.4
Pro-Beijing camp	1	4	140,320	36.3
Independent	0	1	935	0.3
Turnout:			307,611	52.0

== Candidates list ==
Vote share
1. Democratic (46.8%)
2. DAB (29.3%)
3. Citizens (12.8%)
4. Liberal (2.40%)
5. Other (8.70%)

Legislative Election 1998: Hong Kong Island
List	Candidates	Votes	Of total (%)	± from prev.
Democratic	Martin Lee Chu-ming, Yeung Sum Yuen Bun-keung, Chan Kwok-leung	143,843	46.76 (25+21.76)	
DAB	Cheng Kai-nam Ip Kwok-him, Suen Kai-cheong, Christopher Chung Shu-kun	90,182	29.32 (25+4.32)	
Citizens	Christine Loh Kung-wai	39,251	12.76	
Independent	Chong Chan-yau	12,377	4.02	
Nonpartisan	Jennifer Chow Kit-bing	10,950	3.56	
Liberal	Ada Wong Ying-kay, Alice Tso Shing-yuk, Alice Lam Chui-lin	7,845	2.43	
Nonpartisan	Louis Leong Wing-on	2,588	0.84	
Independent	Li Hung	935	0.3	
Total valid votes		307,611	100.00	
Rejected ballots		2,203		
Turnout		309,814	51.96	
Registered electors		596,245		

== See also ==
- Legislative Council of Hong Kong
- Hong Kong legislative elections
- 1998 Hong Kong legislative election
