= 2010 Hong Kong by-elections =

2010 Hong Kong by-election
- 16 May 2010

5 Geographical Constituencies in the Legislative Council
- Turnout: 17.19%
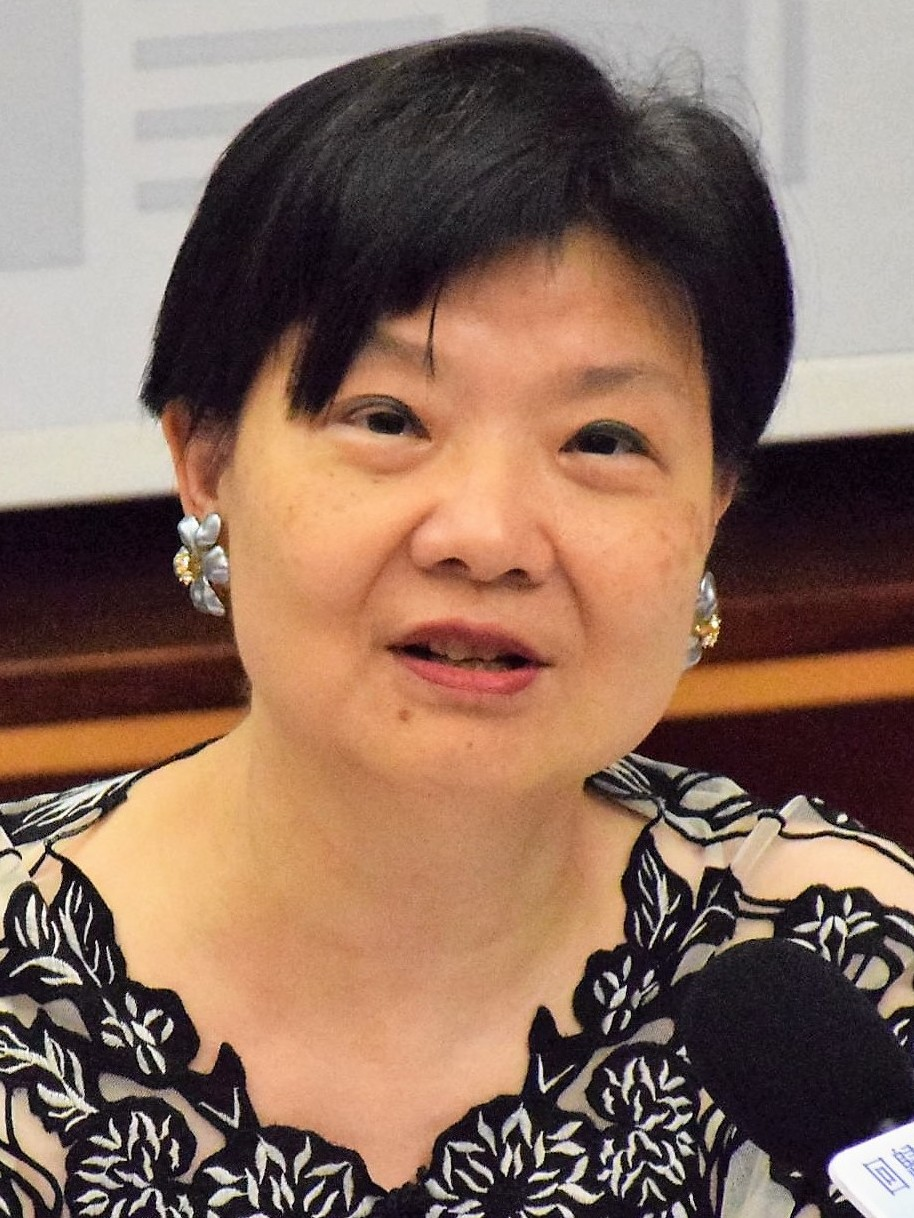

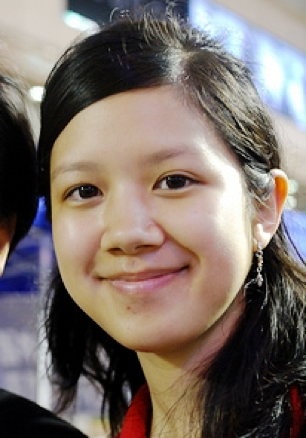
	Majority party	Minority party
Leader	Audrey Eu	Crystal Chow and others
Party	Civic/LSD	Tertiary 2012
Alliance	Five Constituencies Referendum	N/A
Seats before	5	0
Seats after	5	0
Seat change	Steady	Steady
Popular vote	464,561	36,226
Percentage	82.96%	6.47%
- Elected party by each constituency
Members before election
- Tanya Chan (Civic)
- Wong Yuk-man (LSD)
- Alan Leong (Civic)
- Albert Chan (LSD)
- Leung Kwok-hung (LSD)
Elected Members
- Tanya Chan (Civic)
- Wong Yuk-man (LSD)
- Alan Leong (Civic)
- Albert Chan (LSD)
- Leung Kwok-hung (LSD)

The 2010 Hong Kong Legislative Council by-election was an election held on 16 May 2010 in Hong Kong for all five geographical constituencies of the Legislative Council (LegCo), triggered by the resignation of five pan-democrat Legislative Councillors in January of the same year.

Discussions among the pan-democrats commenced in July 2009 for five legislators to resign to force a territory-wide by-election. The plan, which they dubbed the Five Constituencies Referendum (五區公投) or Five Constituencies Resignation (五區總辭), involved one pan-democratic legislator resigning from each of the five geographical constituencies, thereby triggering a by-election in which all Hong Kong citizens could participate. Although the Basic Law of Hong Kong does not provide for official referendums, the pan-democrats hope that by returning the resignees to the Legislative Council, on their manifesto of real political reform in Hong Kong and the abolition of functional constituencies, the election can be seen as a de facto referendum and an endorsement of these issues. The five LegCo members resigned their seats on 21 January 2010 with the by-election taking place on 16 May 2010.

The vote count was finalised by 2 am on 17 May 2010. Following a boycott by the pro-government parties, the five who resigned were successfully returned to the Legislative Council by voters with a turnout rate of only 17.1%. The by-election has been criticised as a waste of taxpayers' money.

== Background ==
According to Annex II of the Basic Law of Hong Kong, the Chief Executive of Hong Kong is elected by an 800-person election committee, consisting of appointees from four different sectors. The Legislative Council (LegCo) consists of 60 seats, 30 of which are geographical constituencies, subject to popular mandate; the remaining 30 seats are returned by functional Constituencies, which are elected by a much smaller pool of voters consisting of corporate bodies and workers in the various sectors. The 800 Election Committee members are appointees. The existing electoral arrangement, which allows a person belonging to a stipulated sector to control more than one vote, has been denounced by Human Rights Monitor as "highly corrupt".

Articles 45 and 68 of the Basic Law state that the Chief Executive and all members of LegCo shall eventually be elected by universal suffrage, while changes in election methods shall be in accordance with the principle of "gradual and orderly progress". According to Annex I and II of the Basic Law, the election method of the Chief Executive and the LegCo may be amended after 2007.

On 29 December 2007, the NPCSC resolved that the Chief Executive and LegCo could be elected via universal suffrage in 2017 and 2020 respectively. The pan-democracy camp has become increasingly frustrated at the slow pace of reform. After the failure to achieve universal suffrage in 2007, the target of the pan-democrats has shifted to 2012; pro-Beijing camp stated its preference for 2017.

On 18 November 2009, based on the NPCSC decision, the Hong Kong Government published the Consultation Document on the Methods for Selecting the Chief Executive and for Forming the LegCo in 2012, which the Government said showed its determination to advance Hong Kong's democratic development in 2012, and to pave way for universal suffrage elections of the Chief Executive and the Legislature as resolved by the NPCSC. The document said that in line with the principle of "gradual and orderly progress", the scope of political participation would be broadened and the democratic elements in the 2012 elections substantially increased; the administration proposed to enlarge the Election Committee for electing the Chief Executive, add ten new LegCo seats, of which five indirectly elected. The administration also proposed to give elected District Council members more seats on the Election Committee. Following the unveiling of the consultation document, Pan-democrats attacked the lack of genuine progress, saying that the proposals were but a rehash of, and in some respects worse than, the 2005 proposals which they vetoed. Anson Chan commented on the lack of substance in the proposals: "The Hong Kong public is now left like someone pedalling a bicycle with no chain: the pedals spin round, but no forward progress is made."

== Five Constituencies Referendum ==
=== LSD stance ===
The League of Social Democrats (LSD) proposed resignations by pan-democrats from LegCo in late July 2009. Wong Yuk-man said that it would "give people the chance to say they don't want any undemocratic reform proposals short of full universal suffrage by 2012." They proposed that members from the pan-democracy camp resign according to the size of their caucus in LegCo: two members from Democratic Party, one member from each the Civic Party and the LSD, and one member from the four independent democrats, chosen by drawing lots, thereby creating a 'referendum effect'. They suggested the timing of the resignations coincide with final reform proposal, after a public consultation exercise in late 2009; they also said that all three LSD legislators would resign if necessary.

=== Democratic Party stance ===
Further to that, Szeto Wah revealed that a meeting was held to discuss the plan in or around September 2009 between Anson Chan, Martin Lee, Allen Lee, and Szeto, brokered by Jimmy Lai, during which he voiced opposition to the "unworkable" plan; the others who attended the meeting appeared to have softened their stance subsequently.

In November 2009, Albert Ho declared his opposition to the referendum plan, as his party was "elected to fight for the public." He added that the proposal would be voted on by party members on 13 December. Szeto Wah said the Democratic Party would not join in the resignations itself, but would support pan-democrats who stood for re-election. Martin Lee called on the other democrats to rethink their participation in the plan.

In December, the Democratic Party membership voted 229 voted against, 54 in favour and one abstention not to join the resignation plan after a four-hour debate; Martin Lee expressed his disappointment.

=== Civic Party stance ===
The Civic Party was initially lukewarm to the idea; it later responded with their "3-Stage Fight Plan for Universal Suffrage", which involves firstly negotiation with the government for a firm roadmap and timetable, Five Constituencies Resignation, and if that is not successful, mass resignation of all 23 democrats in Legco. Party co-founder Ronny Tong opposed the plan, fearing the loss of veto if their numbers dwindled in the by-election. Tong was not confident of the pan-democratic camp being able to mobilise sufficient voters to render meaningful effect in the so-called de facto referendum. He also feared that failing to get Beijing to agree to its demand after the first phase of protest would lead to mass pan-democratic resignations from LegCo, which would be likely to further the split the pan-democratic camp. Around November 2009 there were disputes within the pan-democracy camp as to who would resign or not. Tong said he would not resign his seat in Legco if there was to be a mass resignation, but would instead leave the party he helped found.

=== Pro-Beijing parties' stance ===
In November the Liberal Party chairman James Tien and Chan Yuen-han of the Federation of Trade Unions were looking to contest the by-elections.

== Challenges ==
=== Constitution and legal ===
On 15 January 2010, the State Council's Hong Kong and Macao Affairs Office of China's State Council said any "so-called referendum" would be inconsistent with Hong Kong's legal status and a "blatant challenge" to the Basic Law and the central government's authority. National People's Congress vice chairman and secretary general Li Jianguo reiterated that view at the annual meeting of the Chinese People's Political Consultative Conference in Zhuhai. The same day, both the central government and Hong Kong's Constitutional Affairs minister Stephen Lam said a referendum on Hong Kong's electoral reform would be inconsistent with the Basic Law. Audrey Eu, Civic Party lawmaker who is also a barrister, denied that the resignation scheme challenged the Basic Law and Beijing's authority, and insisted the scheme was legal. A government spokesman said they were obliged, by the Basic Law, to hold by-elections to fill vacant seats, but that any kind of referendum has no legal basis.

A number of local legal scholars have since expressed their opinion that a referendum would not be illegal nor inconsistent with the Basic Law: Albert Chen, professor of law of the University of Hong Kong, said that the referendum was contrary to the spirit of the Basic Law, but it was not illegal and the pan-democrats could not be prosecuted for it; an assistant professor of law at HKU, rejected claims that a non-binding referendum would contravene the Basic Law. An editorial in the SCMP said that while the Basic Law did not expressly rule out or permit referendums, Beijing's statement that the elections are unconstitutional has "dignified the ill-conceived resignation plan by treating it as a matter of constitutional significance."

Some have called for laws to be made to bar lawmakers from resigning without sound reasons in future: Barrister Alan Hoo urged the government to amend the law as soon as possible to prohibit legislators resigning unless they are "incapacitated." Priscilla Leung said she planned to introduce a private member's bill into the Legislative Council soon, to limit the ability of members to resign, which Ronny Tong said would contravene the Basic Law, and infringe upon the right to stand for elections protected under Article 26; he stated that it would be inconsistent with Article 74 for an individual legislator to table bills relating to the political structure. On 10 February, the constitutional affairs panel of LegCo passed a non-binding motion calling on the government to amend election bylaws, barring anyone who has resigned from standing for re-election. Basic Law Committee member Lau Nai-keung said that the government-friendly camp should not contest the by-elections to lend credibility to the campaign. He urged Legco president not to accept the resignations by the five lawmakers, not hold any by-elections to fill the vacancies, and "declare those lawmakers are no longer qualified for office if they are absent from meetings for three consecutive months without valid reasons."

=== Funding ===
The Constitutional and Mainland Affairs Bureau has estimated that the by-elections would cost HK$150 million (US$19.3 million). The Democratic Alliance for the Betterment and Progress of Hong Kong (DAB) and the Liberal Party have not decided whether to approve the LegCo budget for the election. However, instead of making a separate appropriation request for the by-elections, the government provided for HK$159 million in its budget proposal, making it difficult for lawmakers to veto the funding.

Wong Kwok-hing of the Hong Kong Federation of Trade Unions moved the amendment to scrap the HK$147 million funding for the by-election, criticising the two parties for their "farce." The amendment was defeated by a 14-to-37 vote. It was supported by three HKFTU members, the DAB legislators, together with Paul Tse and Priscilla Leung, but voted down in both the functional and geographical constituencies. Albert Ho said it was merely a political expression testing public opinion, and challenged those loyal to Beijing, saying that they should support "upgrad[ing] it to a real referendum."

== Resignation ==
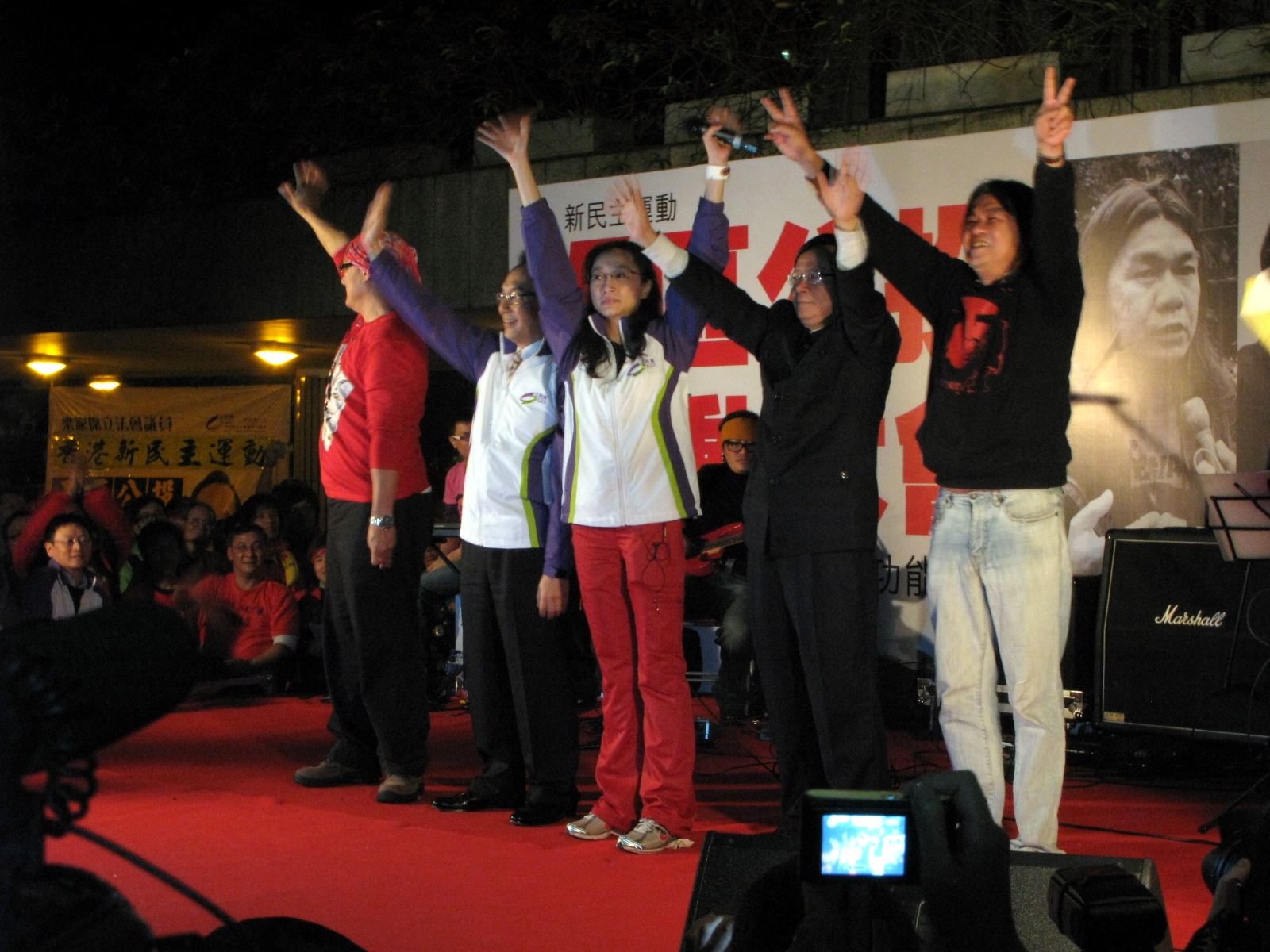
Five resigning democrats at a rally on 27 January 2010.

On 21 January 2010, it was announced that Albert Chan (NT West), Alan Leong (Kowloon East), Tanya Chan (Hong Kong Island), "Longhair" Leung Kwok-hung (NT East) and Wong Yuk-man (Kowloon West), would resign their LegCo seats. The five resignations were submitted on 26 January 2010, with effect of 29 January 2010.

The five resigned pan-democrats had hoped to give a valedictory speech in the Legislative Council, but were prevented from doing so by a walk-out by pro-Beijing lawmakers, who denounced them as "those pushing for 'Hong Kong Independence'". Only 21 pan-democrat lawmakers and four government allies remained in the chamber following the walk-out – short of the 30 required for quorum.

== Post resignation ==
=== Actions and comments of the pro-democracy camp ===
Campaign slogan and advertisement by LSD and Civic party calling for "uprising of the people" (全民起義), attracted media attention and the ire of Beijing. Reception of the slogan was particularly negative by the pro-Beijing camp. Rita Fan attacked the term saying it would set a dangerous precedent by misleading the public over the purpose of the by-elections. She said anyone who has studied Chinese history would know that the word "uprising" convey an image of revolution, blood, and violence and that it would make people think of social turmoil, hardship and chaos. Maria Tam said an uprising usually refers to overthrowing the government through violence, and Former Secretary for Justice Elsie Leung warned of anarchy. Ip Kwok-him, Deputy Chairman of the DAB, said the slogan was seditious; but Audrey Eu said it was an attempt to intimidate the Hong Kong people. Eu said that the 4 Chinese characters do not refer to a violent revolution and that the resignation is not a ploy to seek independence of Hong Kong; Wong Yuk-man emphasised it as a "peaceful uprising". Gordon Wu said the Civic Party and the LSD were destabilising Hong Kong by resigning, and likened the call for people to rise up to action taken by red guards during the Cultural Revolution. Wu said: "Uprising is something very thrilling - although we have not reached the stage of armed struggle." Organisers for the resigners dismissed the criticism as tactics aimed at dampening turnout for the by-elections.

Some controversial Hong Kong comics have also been made by artists inspired by the referendum.

A pan-democracy gathering held in Central on 27 January 2010 was attended by approximately 4,000 people, according to organisers; police gave the number at 1,900. The group also used a song from cantopop group Beyond to sing about freedom. At one point they chanted repeatedly "Uprising, uprising, uprising...", while Albert Chan shouted to the crowd loudly "Liberate Hong Kong" (解放香港).

Civic Party's Alan Leong, celebrating his birthday on a street election campaign, said he was disappointed by several public remarks by Stephen Lam regarding the by-elections. Leong said Lam's remarks were a clear indication that the government had lost its "supposedly neutral attitude." In March, the LSD published an open letter condemning Ronny Tong for betraying his fellow pan-democrats (and not supporting the referendum plan), and bitterly attacked him personally. The Standard said the LSD was "doing its very best to rile Tong to create an imagery of confrontation between referendum advocates and pan-democratic moderates" in order to rekindle media interest.

Democratic Party former leader Szeto Wah, Albert Ho and Martin Lee urged their supporters to vote in the by election; Lee said a blank vote it was preferable to no vote.

=== Student actions ===
A democracy protest organised by the Hong Kong Federation of Students supported by 200 people took place on 28 March 2010 from University of Hong Kong campus to the government offices in Central. The protesters called for abolition of functional constituencies, blaming them for social inequalities. They also want real universal suffrage by 2012. There was also a minor confrontation between some protesters and police; one protester was arrested.

Students from the different HK universities formed a group called Tertiary 2012 (T12), and declared their aim to raise HK$250,000 to field one candidate for each vacant seat. The group, which have no formal alliance with other political parties, raised the necessary deposit from Internet donations and submitted their nomination papers on 1 April. The candidates all endorsed the cause of the Civic Party and the League of Social Democrats, but their platform consists of continuing to press for universal suffrage in both the chief executive and Legislative Council elections in 2012.

=== Response from Hong Kong Government officials ===
Hong Kong Chief Executive Donald Tsang suggested that the by-elections had been "deliberately engineered" and dismissed them as political theatre. He also stated that he was not sure if he would even cast a vote. Audrey Eu said that Tsang's remarks were inappropriate. Wong Yuk-man of the League of Social Democrats suggested that a boycott by Tsang could result in increased voter turnout. Ronny Tong asked whether Tsang had broken the law by declaring he might not vote.

Secretary for Home Affairs Tsang Tak-sing refused to publicly state whether or not he would be voting, stating that he did not have knowledge of all the candidates. Like Tsang, he called the election a political incident. He stated he would follow the government when deciding whether or not to participate, as he believed government officials must have solidarity with one another.

Posters and banners for the by-election were a dull brown and pink, contrasting with the vibrant orange and red of 2007; they also lacked any incitement to vote. Stephen Lam said the government was fulfilling its duty to remind the 3.3 million voters to vote, but added: "We have already said the by-elections are unnecessary and the public has strong views about the HK$150 million cost."

Professor Lau Siu-kai, the head of the Central Policy Unit and the government's chief adviser, said the unit had conducted three surveys since the resignation, all of which consistently showed that more than half the 1,000 respondents polled opposed the 'referendum' campaign. Campaign organisers rejected Lau's claim, saying he famously underestimated attendance at the on 1 July 2003 protest march at 30,000.

=== Response from Chinese officials ===
CPC Hong Kong liaison office head Peng Qinghua responded to the referendum by saying, "There are political groups that have launched the so-called 'five constituencies referendum campaign,' even proposing sensational and extreme slogans like 'civic uprising' and 'liberating Hong Kong. This is a total violation of mainstream public opinion that wants stability, harmony and development."

A Taipei Times editorial said it was inappropriate to use "stability, harmony, development" to justify the lack of democracy in the already stable, harmonious and developed Hong Kong. It was further said that it was even more ironic that Beijing claimed to know "mainstream public opinion" before a referendum has even been held.

=== Boycott ===
In late January, Miriam Lau (Liberal Party) said her party would work closely with DAB to field candidates in the by-elections. James Tien and his brother Michael indicated their interest, but DAB vice-chairman Ip Kwok-him said there were divergent views within his party and that they would only take part in the by-elections if they are not seen as a referendum. Placed in a dilemma by the resignations and the subsequent statements from central government politicians, pro-government politicians could not contest the polls for fear of being seen by Beijing to condone the "unconstitutional act", they thus all planned to boycott it. Tam Yiu-chung, Chairman of the DAB, criticised the by-election as "a farce...It's a waste of taxpayers' money...It promotes social conflict..."

Chief Executive Donald Tsang announced, two days before polling day and after weeks of speculation, that he and his ministers would not vote in the by-elections. He said: "In view of the unique nature of this by-election and after careful consideration, I have decided not to vote in this by-election. All members of my political team share this view and, of their own accord, have also decided not to vote." He also said the government would seek to amend the election law to prevent such abuse in future.

Also breaking with tradition, Electoral Affairs Commission chairman Mr Justice Barnabas Fung refused to appeal to the electorate to vote, as a further sign that the government was trying actively to dampen the election atmosphere.

== Candidates ==
The following people have entered for the by-election.

Geographical Constituency	Candidate	Group/Affiliation	Remark
New Territories East	Leung Kwok-hung	LSD	Resigned LegCo member
New Territories East	Crystal Chow	Tertiary 2012	CUHK student
New Territories East	James Chan (陳國強)	Independent	Not to be confused with a former LegCo member with the same Chinese name (陳國強)
New Territories East	Wu Sai-chuen (胡世全)	Independent	Ex-DAB member
New Territories West	Albert Chan	LSD	Resigned LegCo member
New Territories West	Steven Kwok	Tertiary 2012	HKU student
New Territories West	Chow Ping-tim (鄒秉恬)	Independent	Councillor, Tsuen Wan District; Candidate in the same constituency in 1998, 2004 & 2008
New Territories West	Raymond Li (李世鴻)	Independent	Ex-LSD member
New Territories West	Li Kwai-fong (李桂芳)	Independent	Ex-DP member Councillor, Tuen Mun District
Kowloon East	Alan Leong	Civic	Resigned LegCo councillor
Kowloon East	Luke Lai (黎敬輝)	Tertiary 2012	CUHK student
Kowloon East	Du Sen (杜森)	Independent	Candidate in 1996 Hong Kong Chief Executive election
Kowloon West	Wong Yuk-man	LSD	Resigned LegCo member
Kowloon West	Napoleon Wong (黃永志)	Tertiary 2012	CUHK student
Kowloon West	Ringo Chiang (蔣世昌)	Independent	Ex-LP member Ex-councillor, Kowloon City District; Candidate in the same constituency in 1998
Kowloon West	Pamela Peck	Independent	
Kowloon West	Wilson Shea (佘繼泉)	Independent	Kowloon West New Dynamic; Vice-chairman, Hong Kong Small and Medium Enterprises Association
Kowloon West	Kwok Shiu-ming (郭兆明)	Independent	
Kowloon West	Kenneth Cheung (張錦雄)	Independent	Ex-LSD member
Kowloon West	Lam Yi-lai (林依麗)	Independent	Candidate in the same constituency in 2008
Hong Kong Island	Tanya Chan (陳淑莊)	Civic	Resigned LegCo member
Hong Kong Island	David Lee (李振雄)	Independent	
Hong Kong Island	Leung Wing-ho (梁永浩)	Tertiary 2012	HKPolyU student
Hong Kong Island	Roger Chan	Independent	
Hong Kong Island	Wong Hing (黃興)	Independent	
Hong Kong Island	Spencer Tai	Independent	Kuomintang sympathiser Ex-councillor, Central and Western District

== Pre-election events ==
On 2 May, about 3,000 people participated in a March for universal suffrage starting from Victoria Park; Tanya Chan publicly said that she would not marry until HK gets universal suffrage. At a radio forum Commercial Radio held on 13 May about Sunday's by-election, candidate Lam Yi-lai accused Paul Tse of indecently assaulting her; she filed a complaint to the police.

Two days before polling day, 700 people attended a rally in Centenary Garden, Tsim Sha Tsui organised by the LSD and the Civic Party to urge people to vote. They said a higher turnout would place greater pressure on the government and Beijing to allow Hong Kong full democracy.

== Results ==
Only 17.1% of HK's registered voters cast ballots, as compared to the record of 45.2% for the 2008 legco election. The total number of votes counted was 572,521. Albert Chan, LSD, who made the "Liberate Hong Kong" (解放香港) comment, made the strongest showing.

A professor of the Hong Kong University of Science and Technology stated that 24% of voters were under 30 years of age, compared to 14% of the population. The under-30 age group were also active as volunteers at all polling stations.

Hong Kong Island
Party	Candidate	Votes	%	±%
Civic	Tanya Chan	103,564	92.7	
Nonpartisan	Tai Cheuk-yin	3,144	2.8	
Tertiary 2012	Leung Wing-ho	2,715	2.4	
Nonpartisan	Lee Chun-hung	1,542	1.4	
Nonpartisan	Wong Hing	799	0.7	
Majority		100,420	89.9	
Total valid votes		111,764	100.0	
Rejected ballots		3,409		
Turnout		115,173	18.5	
Registered electors		622,756		
Civic hold		Swing		

Kowloon West
Party	Candidate	Votes	%	±%
LSD	Wong Yuk-man	60,395	67.8	
Nonpartisan	Pamela Peck Wan-kam	16,640	18.7	
Tertiary 2012	Wong Weng-chi	3,429	3.8	
Nonpartisan	Chiang Sai-cheong	3,109	3.5	
Nonpartisan	Shea Kai-chuen	2,517	2.8	
Nonpartisan	Kenneth Cheung Kam-chung	1,869	2.1	
Nonpartisan	Lam Yi-lai	1,069	1.2	
Nonpartisan	Kwok Shiu-ming	91	0.1	
Majority		43,755	49.1	
Total valid votes		89,119	100.0	
Rejected ballots		2,682		
Turnout		91,801	21.1	
Registered electors		434,519		
LSD hold		Swing		

Kowloon East
Party	Candidate	Votes	%	±%
Civic	Alan Leong Kah-kit	82,066	92.5	
Tertiary 2012	Lai King-fai	6,630	7.5	
Majority		75,436	85.0	
Total valid votes		88,696	100.0	
Rejected ballots		2,530		
Turnout		91,226	16.8	
Registered electors		543,253		
Civic hold		Swing		

New Territories West
Party	Candidate	Votes	%	±%
LSD	Albert Chan Wai-yip	109,609	81.7	
Nonpartisan	Li Kwai-fong	12,555	9.4	
Tertiary 2012	Kwok Wing-kin	6,192	4.6	
Independent	Chow Ping-tim	3,276	2.4	
Nonpartisan	Li Sai-hung	2,475	1.8	
Majority		97,054	72.3	
Total valid votes		134,107	100.0	
Rejected ballots		5,256		
Turnout		139,363	14.7	
Registered electors		947,276		
LSD hold		Swing		

New Territories East
Party	Candidate	Votes	%	±%
LSD	Leung Kwok-hung	108,927	73.2	
Tertiary 2012	Crystal Chow Ching	17,260	11.6	
Nonpartisan	James Chan Kwok-keung	7,310	4.9	
Nonpartisan	Wu Sai-chuen	2,783	1.9	
Majority		91,667	89.9	
Total valid votes		136,280	100.0	
Rejected ballots		5,952		
Turnout		142,232	17.2	
Registered electors		825,538		
LSD hold		Swing		

== Attempts at "plugging the loophole" ==
In mid-May 2011, the government, which considered the resignations leading to de facto referendum 'abusive' and a waste of resources, revealed its plan to do away with by-elections entirely. Unveiling the proposal, Secretary for Constitutional and Mainland Affairs Stephen Lam cited the practice elsewhere: "In some countries where the proportional representation (PR) system is adopted, by-elections are not used to fill vacant seats arising mid-term." According to the plan, a Legislative Council seat in any geographical constituency or one of the five newly created district council 'superconstituencies' vacated by the resignation or death of a legislator would be filled by a 'leapfrog' mechanism by the next best placed candidate at the previous election. The plan attracted criticism from Pan-Democrats; even pro-government figures in the legislature expressed reservations about the workability of the plan. A researcher in Britain's Electoral Reform Society said it was indeed common for vacancies to be filled by a candidate who was next-in-line, but one who was on the specific list of the outgoing. He said that the proposal meant that a seat held by a small party (without a list) would automatically go to another party if its representative resigned or died, thereby entirely losing representation. The Bar Association issued four strongly worded public warnings within two weeks of the first announcement of the plan, expressing concern over the constitutionality of the proposals, particularly the reasonableness on restrictions on the right to participation. Academics echoed the sentiments, and also brought to light the possibility, albeit slim, that the new mechanism may abet assassinations.

The government tabled a bill to amend current legislation for by-elections for 13 July. However, by late June, the bill's future looked in doubt when the Central Government Liaison Office suggested a re-think. On 28 June, the government revised its proposal stipulating replacement by an unsuccessful candidate on the same election ticket. Whilst pro-government legislators declared support for the revised plan in principle, Regina Ip stated that consultation would still be desirable. The government bowed to pressure and announced one week later that it would suspend reading of the bill for two months, pending consultations on the revised proposals.

== See also ==
- David Davis by-election campaign, 2008
- Democratic development in Hong Kong
- 1986 Northern Ireland by-elections
- Resignation from the British House of Commons
- 2012 Hong Kong legislative election
- July 2018 Australian federal by-elections
