= Alex Chan =

Alex Chan may refer to:

- Alex Chan (engineer), British Formula One engineer
- Alex Chan (politician), former leader of the Citizens Party of Hong Kong
- Alex Chan (rugby league) (born 1974), New Zealand rugby league player

== See also ==
- Chan (surname)
