= New Territories North (1995 constituency) =

- Former Geographical constituency for the Legislative Council of Hong Kong
- Boundary of New Territories North in Hong Kong
- District: North District; Northern Yuen Long District
- Region: New Territories
- Electorate: 99,352

Former constituency
- Created: 1995
- Abolished: 1997
- Created from: New Territories North (1991); New Territories West (1991)
- Replaced by: New Territories East (1998); New Territories West (1998)

New Territories North was a geographical constituencies in the election for the Legislative Council of Hong Kong in 1995, which elects one member of the Legislative Council using the first-past-the-post voting system. The constituency covers North District and northern part of Yuen Long District (Fairview Park and San Tin) in New Territories.

The constituency was divided and replaced by New Territories East and New Territories West constituencies in 1998 after the handover of Hong Kong a year before.

== Returned members ==
Elected members are as follows:

Election	Member	Party
1995	Cheung Hon-chung	DAB

== Election results ==
1995 Legislative Council election: New Territories North
Party	Candidate	Votes	%	±%
DAB	Cheung Hon-chung	17,026	50.07	
Democratic	Wong Sing-chi	16,978	49.93	
Majority		48	0.14	
Total valid votes		34,004	100.00	
Rejected ballots		368		
Turnout		34,372	34.60	
Registered electors		99,352		
DAB win (new seat)				
