= San Fu (constituency) =

Constituency in the Tai Po District, Hong Kong

- Elected constituency for the Tai Po District Council
- Boundary of San Fu in Tai Po District
- District: Tai Po
- Legislative Council constituency: New Territories North East
- Population: 15,444 (2019)
- Electorate: 10,275 (2019)

Current constituency
- Created: 1999
- Number of members: One
- Member: Vacant

San Fu is one of the 19 constituencies in the Tai Po District.

The constituency returns one district councillor to the Tai Po District Council, with an election every four years. The seat was currently held by Wu Yiu-cheong of the Neo Democrats.

San Fu constituency is loosely based on private apartments Classical Gardens, Dynasty View and Grand Dynasty View and also villages Kam Shek New Village and Pan Chung New Village in Tai Po with estimated population of 15,444.

== Councillors represented ==
Election	Member	Party
1999	Wu Kam-fai	Independent
2003	Alan Lo Sou-chour	Democratic→Nonpartisan
2007	Alan Lo Sou-chour	Nonpartisan
2011	Alan Lo Sou-chour	Nonpartisan→Economic Synergy→BPA
2015 by-election	Kwok Wing-kin	Labour
2015	Lo Hiu-fung	Independent→BPA
2019	Max Wu Yiu-cheong→Vacant (Note: Resigned on 10 May 2021 over new oath-taking law.)	Neo Democrats

== Election results ==
=== 2010s ===
Tai Po District Council Election, 2019: San Fu
Party	Candidate	Votes	%	±%
Neo Democrats	Max Wu Yiu-cheong	4,435	56.43	
BPA	Lo Hiu-fung	3,424	43.57	−9.13
Majority		1,011	12.86	
Turnout		7,897	76.89	
Neo Democrats gain from BPA		Swing		

Tai Po District Council Election, 2015: San Fu
Party	Candidate	Votes	%	±%
Independent	Lo Hiu-fung	2,447	52.7	+22.3
Labour	Kwok Wing-kin	2,064	44.5	+6.4
Nonpartisan	Wu Kam-fai	129	2.8	
Majority		383	7.2	
Turnout		4,685	50.8	+8.2
Independent gain from Labour		Swing		

San Fu by-election, 2015
Party	Candidate	Votes	%	±%
Labour	Kwok Wing-kin	1,392	38.14	
Independent	Ho Man-kit	1,147	31.42	
Independent	Lo Hiu-fung	1,111	30.44	
Majority		245	6.71	–40.65
Turnout		3,680	42.55	
Labour gain from BPA		Swing		

Tai Po District Council Election, 2011: San Fu
Party	Candidate	Votes	%	±%
Nonpartisan	Alan Lo Sou-chour	2,129	68.74	−3,44
Independent	Donald Chung Yuk-fai	662	21.38	
Independent	Alan Lam Ching-lun	306	9.88	
Majority		1,467	47.36	+3.00
Nonpartisan hold		Swing		

=== 2000s ===
Tai Po District Council Election, 2007: San Fu
Party	Candidate	Votes	%	±%
Nonpartisan	Alan Lo Sou-chour	2,140	72.18	+9.40
Civic	Cheng Tsz-kiu	825	27.82	
Majority		1,315	44.36	+1.35
Nonpartisan hold		Swing		

Tai Po District Council Election, 2003: San Fu
Party	Candidate	Votes	%	±%
Democratic	Alan Lo Sou-chour	1,899	62.78	+15.82
Independent	Eric Wu Kam-fai	598	19.77	−33.27
DAB	Wan Koon-kau	528	17.45	
Majority		1,301	43.01	+36.93
Democratic gain from Independent		Swing	+24.55	

=== 1990s ===
Tai Po District Council Election, 1999: San Fu
Party	Candidate	Votes	%	±%
Independent	Wu Kam-fai	908	53.04	
Democratic	Alan Lo Sou-chour	804	46.96	
Majority		828	6.08	
Independent win (new seat)				
