= 2010 March for universal suffrage =

2010 March for Universal Suffrage
- Date: May 2, 2010

The 2010 March for universal suffrage (Chinese: 5.2大遊行) was a march held in Hong Kong on May 2, 2010. The event occurred on the second day of the Shanghai 2010 expo. It came a day after the neighboring 2010 Macau labour protest.

== Protest ==
More than 3,000 people participated in the march to demand full democracy in Hong Kong. Protesters marched from Victoria Park to the Central Government Offices. In January 2010, the Five Constituencies Referendum triggered a by-election when five pan-democrats stepped down. A by-election was scheduled for May 16, 2010.

A reform package was previously proposed that would have expanded a selection committee to 1,200 people and added ten members to the legislature. In general, pan-democrats have said they wanted to reject the package. Under the Hong Kong Basic Law, political reform requires the support of 2/3 of the legislature. This means 20 opposition votes would be enough to reject the package if Pro-Beijing Legco president Jasper Tsang does not vote. Tsang himself has said he wants the Beijing reform package to pass and would resign to vote.

== See also ==
- Democratic development in Hong Kong
