= Tertiary 2012 =

Student political group

Tertiary 2012 is a student group formed in 2010 for the 2010 Hong Kong by-election, so called the "Five District Referendum".

== History ==
In January 2010, five Legislative Council members from the Civic Party and resigned to trigger a territory-wide by-election, de facto referendum. The five candidates of the "5 District Referendum Movement" advocate implementation of true universal suffrage and abolition of functional constituencies in the government's reform package for the 2012 Legislative Council election and 2012 Chief Executive election.

Facing the boycott by the pro-Beijing camp, students from the different HK universities formed Tertiary 2012 in March to fill in candidates in the five constituencies to prevent uncontested election. They declared their aim to raise HK$250,000 to field one candidate for each vacant seat. The group, which have no formal alliance with other political parties, raised the necessary deposit from Internet donations and submitted their nomination papers on 1 April. The candidates all endorsed the cause of the Civic Party and the League of Social Democrats, but their platform consists of continuing to press for universal suffrage in both the chief executive and Legislative Council elections in 2012.

The candidates of the 5 District Referendum Movement were elected, with candidates from the Tertiary 2012 defeated.

== Candidates ==
- Crystal Chow, New Territories East - Chinese University of Hong Kong student
- Steven Kwok, New Territories West - University of Hong Kong student
- Luke Lai, Kowloon East - Chinese University of Hong Kong student
- Napoleon Wong, Kowloon West - Chinese University of Hong Kong student
- Leung Wing-ho, Hong Kong Island - Hong Kong Polytechnic University student
