= Crystal Chow =

Hong Kong activist

Crystal Chow Ching
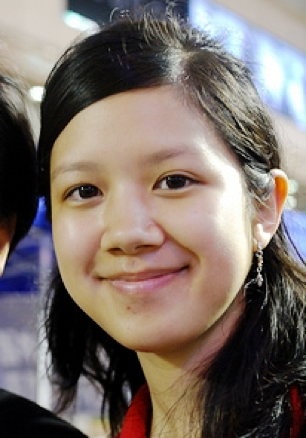
- Crystal Chow in 2009
- Born: September 13, 1986 (age 40); British Hong Kong
- Occupation: Social activist

Crystal Chow Ching (Chinese: 周澄; 13 September 1986) is a former Hong Kong activist. She was the vice-chairman of the Chinese University of Hong Kong Students' Union from 2008 to 2009 and the secretary-general of the Hong Kong Federation of Students from 2009 to 2010. She ran in the 2010 Hong Kong by-election as the candidate of Tertiary 2012 in support of the Five Constituencies Referendum.

== Biography ==
Daughter of film director and screenwriter Ivy Ho, Chow was educated at the pro-Beijing Pui Kiu Middle School. She studied Cultural Studies at the Chinese University of Hong Kong (CUHK) and was a member of the Hong Kong Alliance in Support of Patriotic Democratic Movements in China. She campaigned for the pro-democracy camp in the 2004 Legislative Council election.

Chow was the vice-chairman of the Chinese University of Hong Kong Students' Union from 2008 to 2009 and the secretary-general of the Hong Kong Federation of Students from 2009 to 2010. She rose to fame in the Five Constituencies Referendum movement launched by the League of Social Democrats (LSD) and the Civic Party. She formed the Tertiary 2012 with other university students to prevent uncontested election as the pro-Beijing camp deemed the resignation-triggered by-election as "unconstitutional" referendum. Chow ran in New Territories East against Leung Kwok-hung and received 17,260 votes, 11 per cent of the total vote share and the highest vote share among the Tertiary 2012 candidates.
