= Kwok Wing-kin =

Hong Kong politician

- 郭永健
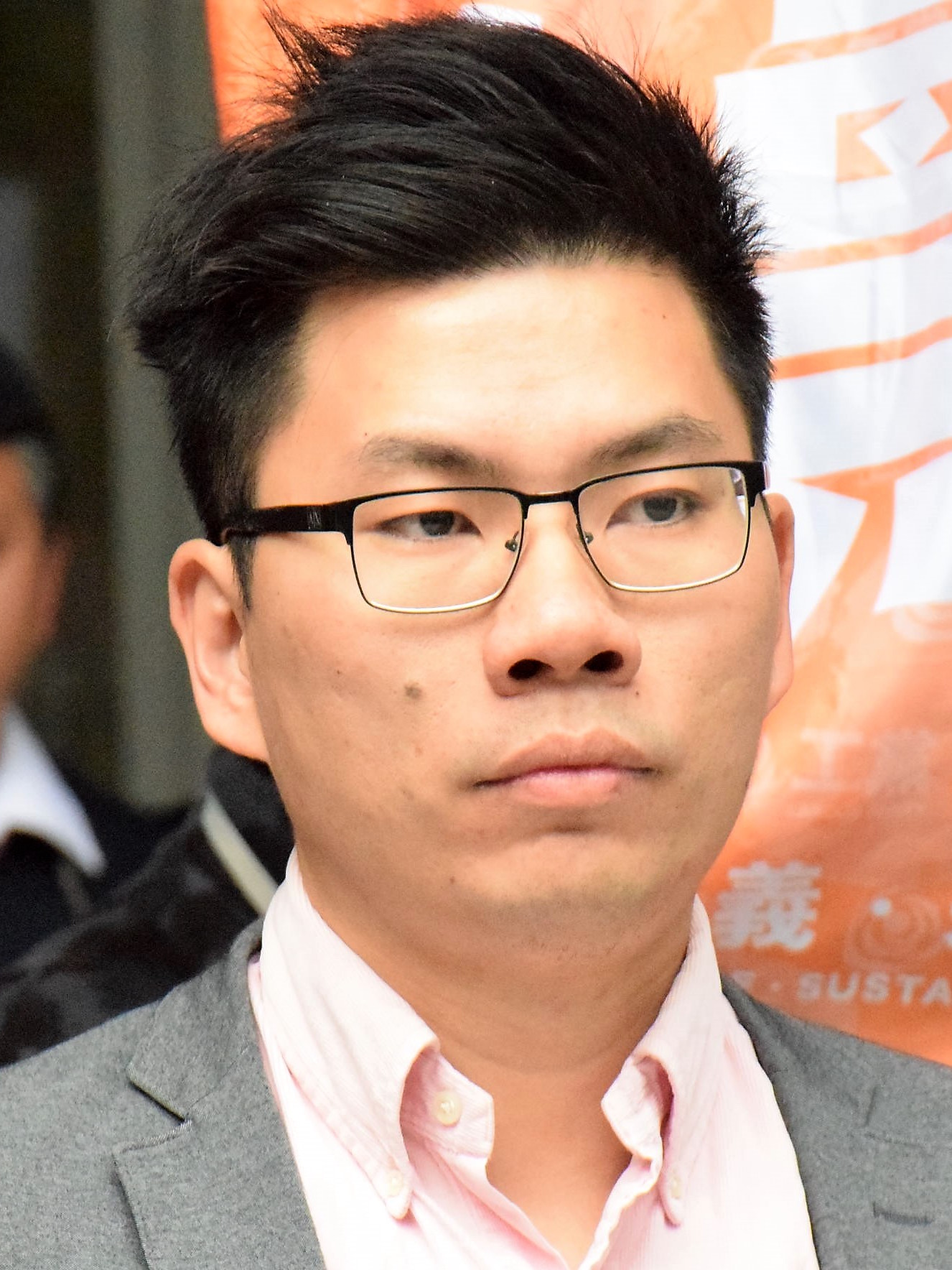

Chairman of the Labour Party
- Incumbent
- Assumed office 19 November 2017
- Preceded by: Suzanne Wu

Member of the Tai Po District Council
- In office 20 July 2015 – 22 November 2015
- Preceded by: Lo Sou-chour
- Succeeded by: Lo Hiu-fung
- Constituency: San Fu

Personal details
- Born: 30 November 1986 (age 39) Hong Kong
- Party: Labour Party; Left 21
- Occupation: Politician

Steven Kwok Wing-kin (Chinese: 郭永健; born 30 November 1986) is a Hong Kong politician and the chairman of the Labour Party since 2017. He is also a former member of the Tai Po District Council.

== Biography ==
Kwok was educated at the University of Hong Kong (HKU) and was the president of the Hong Kong University Students' Union and the chairman of the Standing Committee of the Hong Kong Federation of Students (HKFS). He ran in the "Five Constituencies Referendum" launched by the pan-democrats under the banner of "Tertiary 2012" in 2010. He ran in New Territories West against Albert Chan and received 6,192 votes, 4.6 percent of the vote.

He became member of the Labour Party, a pro-democratic social democratic party established in 2011. He ran in the 2012 Legislative Council election with Fernando Cheung in New Territories East and helped Cheung to be re-elected.

In a Tai Po District Council by-election in San Fu in July 2015, he was elected with 1,392 votes, becoming the first Labour member to be elected to the District Councils. His office just lasted four months when he lost his seat in the 2015 District Council elections, becoming the shortest serving District Councillor in history.

He partnered with Fernando Cheung in the 2016 Legislative Council election again and the duo received 49,800 which saw Cheung re-elected successfully.

In 2017 Labour party leadership, he was elected the new party chairman, after former chairwoman Suzanne Wu resigned amidst the internal rift in the party in the earlier month.

He joined the pro-democracy primary for the 2018 New Territories East by-election, competing against Tommy Cheung and Gary Fan for the seat left vacant by Baggio Leung who was disqualified over the oath-taking controversy.

== Arrest ==
Kwok was arrested on 1 November 2020, along with six other democrats, in connection with the melee that had broken out in the LegCo on 8 May 2020. On that day, Starry Lee, the incumbent chair of the House Committee of the Legislative Council, had attempted to commence a meeting of the Committee after extended stalling tactics of the pan-democratic camp over the previous months.

Political offices
Preceded by Lo Sou-chour	Member of the Tai Po District Council; Representative for San Fu; 2015	Succeeded by Lo Hiu-fung
Party political offices
Preceded by Suzanne Wu	Chairman of the Labour Party; 2017–present	Incumbent
