= New Territories North (1991 constituency) =

- Former Geographical constituency for the Legislative Council of Hong Kong
- Boundary of New Territories North in Hong Kong
- District: North District; Tai Po District
- Region: New Territories
- Electorate: 121,989

Former constituency
- Created: 1991
- Abolished: 1995
- Number of members: Two
- Replaced by: New Territories North; New Territories North-east

New Territories North was a geographical constituency in the election for the Legislative Council of Hong Kong in 1991, which elects two members of the Legislative Council using the dual-seat constituency dual vote system. The constituency covers North District and Tai Po District in New Territories.

The constituency was divided and replaced by the New Territories North and New Territories North-east constituencies in 1995.

== Returned members ==
Elected members are as follows:

Election	Member	Party	Member	Party
1991	Fung Chi-wood	UDHK	Tik Chi-yuen	MP
1994	Fung Chi-wood	Democratic	Tik Chi-yuen	Democratic

== Election results ==
1991 Legislative Council election: New Territories North
Party	Candidate	Votes	%	±%
United Democrats	Fung Chi-wood	23,267	27.34	
Meeting Point	Tik Chi-yuen	21,702	25.50	
LDF	Cheung Hon-chung	16,221	19.11	
LDF	Johnny Wong Chi-keung	15,350	18.04	
ADPL	Ronald Chow Mei-tak	7,117	8.36	
Independent	Tong Wai-man	1,449	1.70	
Turnout		46,644	38.24	
Registered electors		121,989		
United Democrats win (new seat)				
Meeting Point win (new seat)				
