= Civic Exchange =

Hong Kong-based think tank and charity

- 思匯政策研究所
- Abbreviation: CEx
- Formation: September 2000
- Type: Public policy think tank
- Legal status: Registered charity
- Purpose: Environmental & urban liveability research
- Headquarters: 23/F, Chun Wo Commercial Centre, 23–29 Wing Wo Street, Central, Hong Kong
- Region served: Hong Kong
- Chairman of the Board: Evan Auyang
- Key people: Christine Loh; Paul Zimmerman
- Website: Official website

Civic Exchange
- Traditional Chinese: 思匯政策研究所
- Yale Romanization: Sī wúih jing chaak yìhn gau só
- Jyutping: Si^{1} wui^{6} zing^{3} caak^{3} jin^{4} gau^{3} sor^{2}

Civic Exchange is a Hong Kong–based public policy think tank and registered charity.

It was founded in 2000 by politician Christine Loh (陸恭蕙), and environmental researcher Lisa Hopkinson (何麗莎). Past CEOs include Loh, Yan-yan Yip, Maura Wong and Winnie Cheung. Its board, headed by Evan Auyang, includes directors with backgrounds in business, philanthropy, law and medicine. Local district councilor Paul Zimmerman sits on its Board.

Civic Exchange positions itself as independent and non-partisan. Its main areas of research are air quality, the environment, nature conservation, urban design and planning, and wellbeing.

Since 2011, the Lauder Institute at the University of Pennsylvania has ranked Civic Exchange among the top 50 environmental think-tanks in the world.

Civic Exchange cooperates with government departments, educational institutions, businesses and the public. It works to improve dialogue between civil society and the government.

== Research areas ==
=== Pollution ===
Civic Exchange has conducted numerous local and regional research studies on topics like roadside emissions, environmental governance, public health and the Pearl River Delta (PRD).

In 2017, it published a report on Hong Kong residents' exposure to the pollutant PM2.5.

For more than a decade, Civic Exchange has worked on the problem of ship emissions in the PRD.

=== Nature conservation ===
In early 2017, Civic Exchange published a baseline study of the public's awareness and attitudes towards biodiversity conservation, based on Cantonese-language polling of more than 1,000 respondents. It showed a "very low" level of awareness and concern about biodiversity among the Hong Kong public.

In 2014, the Environmental Investigation Agency's report "Routes of Extinction" identified Hong Kong as a major smuggling hub for illegal timber and other wildlife products. Later that year Civic Exchange published Taking from the Wild: Moving Towards Sustainability in Hong Kong's Wildlife Trade.

=== Urban environment ===
Civic Exchange studies sustainable transport planning, land policy, waterfront design, urban renewal, walkability, public open space, and the "small house policy," a local issue related to Hong Kong's villages. It has also conducted comparative reports between Hong Kong and other Asian cities.

In February 2017, CEx measured and outlined urban public space across Hong Kong. Its argument was that Hong Kongers received far less of such space - like public parks and playgrounds - than residents of other similarly dense Asian cities. The report was the result of a crowdsourcing campaign that raised more than HK $300,000.

A major recent focus has been walkability. In October 2016, Civic Exchange hosted the international Walk21 Conference, which included more than 150 speakers from around the world. Then-Chief Secretary of the Hong Kong Government, and current Chief Executive candidate Carrie Lam was the keynote speaker. That was followed by the launch of a Walkability initiative in December 2016. Its panel includes architect Christopher Law and architect Rocco Yim of Rocco Design Architects.

From 2016 to 2017, Civic Exchange produced a series of reports comparing wellbeing and satisfaction in major Asian cities like Hong Kong, Singapore and Shanghai.

Civic Exchange first published a policy review of the Small House Policy in 2003, followed by Small House Policy II: An Update in 2013. Their latest report Small Houses, Big Effects: Public Opinion Survey on the Small House Policy, published in 2015, helps stakeholders consider the best approach to dialogue on this topic.

== Other programme areas ==
Aside from the main focuses addressed through Civic Exchange's publications and events, the organization also runs other programmes.

Civic Exchange offers an internship programme in research and communications, open during the summer months (May to August).

Civic Exchange holds or co-hosts regular conferences, talks, workshops and public discussions to generate engagement from government, academics, NGOs and a broader public. Past speakers have been politicians, scholars and businessmen, including Prof Dan Bodansky, Matt Postles, Dave Ho, Silvia Ding, Sum Yin Kwong, Tze Wai Wong, Prof. Allen Zheng, Penelope McDaniel, Eddie Fish, Arthur Lui, Vinay Patwardhan, Prof. Peter Clift, Dr. Jean Philippe Lafore, Prof. Gabriel Lau, Prof. William Lau.

== Funding ==
Civic Exchange is independently funded. Nearly all of the organization's funding comes from donations on specific projects, rather than general donations. According to its 2015–16 annual report, 57% of funding came from Hong Kong non-profits and foundations, 29% from Hong Kong businesses, and the rest from government, the public sector, individuals and overseas donors.

== Publications ==
Research Reports

Civic Exchange has published or co-published more than 200 research reports since 2000.

Recent research reports

- Pathways to Net Zero Carbon Emissions by 2050. June 2020
- Monitoring Personal Exposure to PM2.5 in Hong Kong with Next Generation Sensors. June 2017
- The Illusion of Plenty: Hong Kong's Water Security, Working Towards Regional Water Harmony. May 2017
- Unopened Space: Mapping Equitable Availability of Open Space in Hong Kong. February 2017.
- The First Baseline Study of the General Public's Awareness and Attitudes towards Biodiversity Conservation in Hong Kong. January 2017
- Asian Wellbeing Indicators: A series of four reports on Hong Kong, Shanghai and Singapore, 2016–2017.
- Controlling Ship Emissions in the Pearl River Delta. December 2016
- Measuring and Improving Walkability in Hong Kong. December 2016
- Training and Development of Inspection and Maintenance Personnel in Hong Kong for Road Vehicles. January 2016

Books

Select published and affiliated books

- Getting Heard: A Handbook for Hong Kong Citizens (讓民意聲音響起來), 2002: the first book published by Civic Exchange.
- Building Democracy: Creating Good Government for Hong Kong (創建民主:締造一個優良的香港特區政府), 2003.
- At the Epicentre: Hong Kong and the SARS Outbreak, 2004.
- Functional Constituencies: A Unique Feature of the Hong Kong Legislative Council, 2005.
- The Rise of Hong Kong Politics: the view through political cartoons 1984–2005 (從政治漫畫分析香港政治的興起), 2006.
- Idling Engine: Hong Kong's Environmental Policy in a Ten Year Stall, 2007.
- Still Holding Our Breath: A Review of Air Quality Policy in Hong Kong 1997–2007, 2007.
- Reflections of Leadership: Tung Chee Hwa and Donald Tsang, 1997–2007, 2007.
- From Nowhere to Nowhere: A Review of Constitutional Development-Hong Kong 1997–2007, 2007.
- Climate Change Negotiations: Can Asia Change the Game?, 2008.
- Electing Hong Kong's Chief Executive, 2011
- Global Cities: Urban Environments in Los Angeles, Hong Kong and China, MIT Press, 2017

== See also ==
- List of think tanks in Hong Kong
