= New Territories East (1991 constituency) =

- Former Geographical constituency for the Legislative Council of Hong Kong
- Boundary of New Territories East in Hong Kong
- District: Sai Kung District; Sha Tin District
- Region: New Territories
- Electorate: 197,614

Former constituency
- Created: 1991
- Abolished: 1995
- Number of members: Two
- Replaced by: New Territories East; New Territories South-east

New Territories East was a geographical constituency in the election for the Legislative Council of Hong Kong in 1991, which elects two members of the Legislative Council using the dual-seat constituency dual vote system. The constituency covers Sai Kung District and Sha Tin District in New Territories.

The constituency was divided and replaced by the New Territories East and New Territories South-east constituencies in 1995.

== Returned members ==
Elected members are as follows:

Election	Member	Party	Member	Party
1991	Emily Lau	Independent	Andrew Wong	Independent

== Election results ==
1991 Legislative Council election: New Territories East
Party	Candidate	Votes	%	±%
Independent	Emily Lau Wai-hing	46,515	26.29	
Independent	Andrew Wong Wang-fat	39,806	22.50	
Independent	Tony Kan Chung-nin	37,126	20.99	
United Democrats	Lau Kong-wah	26,659	15.07	
United Democrats	Johnston Wong Hong-chung	26,156	14.78	
Independent	Choi Man-hing	348	0.20	
Independent	Eric Leung Ka-ching	306	0.17	
Turnout		96,637	48.90	
Registered electors		197,614		
Independent win (new seat)				
Independent win (new seat)				
