= New Territories North-east (1995 constituency) =

- Former Geographical constituency for the Legislative Council of Hong Kong
- Boundary of New Territories North-east in Hong Kong
- District: Tai Po District
- Region: New Territories
- Electorate: 112,444

Former constituency
- Created: 1995
- Abolished: 1997
- Created from: New Territories North
- Replaced by: New Territories East

New Territories North-east was a geographical constituency in the election for the Legislative Council of Hong Kong in 1995, which elects one member of the Legislative Council using the first-past-the-post voting system. The constituency covers Tai Po District in New Territories.

The constituency was merged into the New Territories East constituency in 1998 after the handover of Hong Kong a year before.

== Returned members ==
Elected members are as follows:

Election	Member	Party
1995	Allen Lee	Liberal

== Election results ==
1995 Legislative Council election: New Territories North-east
Party	Candidate	Votes	%	±%
Liberal	Allen Lee Peng-fei	15,216	34.82	
DAB	Cheung Hok-ming	12,256	28.04	
Democratic	Cheung Wing-fai	11,507	26.33	
United Ants	Law Yuk-kai	4,723	10.81	
Majority		2,960	6.78	
Total valid votes		43,702	100.00	
Rejected ballots		478		
Turnout		44,180	39.29	
Registered electors		112,444		
Liberal win (new seat)				
