= New Territories East =

Area of Hong Kong

Boundary of New Territories East constituency from 1998 to 2021, also the mostly-recognised boundary of the region

New Territories East is the eastern part of New Territories, covering North, Tai Po, Sha Tin, and Sai Kung District.

== History ==
All districts except Sai Kung District have been connected by the Kowloon–Canton Railway (now East Rail line) since its completion in 1910, and later the Tai Po Road.

In 1985, "East New Territories" and "South New Territories" electoral-college constituencies were created. East New Territories consisted of North District, Tai Po District and Sha Tin District, while South New Territories consisted of Sai Kung District, Tsuen Wan District and Islands District. The electoral colleges lasted for two terms until they were replaced by the geographical constituencies in 1991 when the first direct election to the Legislative Council were introduced.

In the 1991 election, the directly elected "New Territories North" and "New Territories East" constituencies were created, each returning two members to the Legislative Council using the two-seat constituency two vote system. New Territories North consisted of North and Tai Po Districts, while New Territories East consisted of Sha Tin and Sai Kung Districts. The two seats in New Territories North were won by the Fung Chi-wood and Tik Chi-yuen of the pro-democracy United Democrats–Meeting Point coalition which also won a landslide in the other constituencies, the New Territories East elected two independents, the radical Emily Lau and moderate Andrew Wong.

The electoral system was overhauled after one term, replaced by the single-constituency single-vote system in the 1995 Legislative Council election with four new constituencies, "New Territories East", "New Territories South-east", "New Territories North" and "New Territories North-east". Although Emily Lau and Andrew Wong were elected in New Territories East and New Territories South-east, Cheung Hon-chung of the pro-Beijing Democratic Alliance for the Betterment of Hong Kong (DAB) and Allen Lee of the pro-business Liberal Party each defeated the Democratic Party candidates in New Territories North and New Territories North-east.

Following the handover in 1997, the "New Territories East" constituency replaced the colonial constituencies. It remained in place until 2021 under the change of electoral system, "New Territories North", "New Territories North East", and "New Territories South East" were installed as the new constituencies.

== Evolution ==
Years \ Districts	North	Tai Po	Sha Tin		Sai Kung
Years \ Districts	North	Tai Po	Western part	Eastern part	Sai Kung
1985–1991	East New Territories				South New Territories
1991–1995	New Territories North		New Territories East		
1995–1997	New Territories North	New Territories North-east	New Territories East	New Territories South-east	
1998–2021	New Territories East				
2021–present	New Territories North	New Territories North-east		New Territories South-east	
