= Alex Chan (engineer) =

British engineer

- Citizenship: British
- Education: University of Oxford
- Occupation: Engineer
- Employer: Audi Revolut F1 Team
- Title: Head of Race Engineering

Alex Chan is a British Formula One engineer. He is currently the Head of Race Engineering at the Audi Revolut F1 Team.

== Career ==
Chan studied physics at the University of Oxford before entering starting his motorsport career as a performance analyst with the Caterham F1 Team in 2012. There he worked within the vehicle performance group, analysing telemetry, supporting set-up development, and assisting trackside engineers during race weekends. He progressed to Performance Analyst in 2014, contributing to correlation work between simulation tools and circuit data.

Chan joined the Sauber F1 Team in late 2014 as a Vehicle Dynamics Engineer. In this role he worked on simulator correlation, tyre analysis, and car performance modelling before being promoted to Performance Engineer in 2016. He initially supported Marcus Ericsson from 2016 to 2018, focusing on data analysis, set-up optimisation, and race-weekend performance operations. From 2019 to 2021 Chan served as Performance Engineer to Kimi Räikkönen, working closely with the 2007 World Champion on car balance, tyre usage, and operational execution as Sauber competed under the Alfa Romeo Racing identity. In 2022, Chan was promoted to Race Engineer, partnering Valtteri Bottas. He remained in this role through the 2024 Miami Grand Prix, overseeing car performance, race execution and trackside engineering coordination. For the remainder of the 2024 season, he transitioned to a factory-based race engineering position, supporting performance operations from Hinwil.

He was appointed Chief Race Engineer for the 2025 season and, following the team's transition to Audi F1 Team, was promoted to Head of Race Engineering. In this capacity he oversees race-engineering operations, leads trackside processes, and supports Audi's progression into full works Formula One competition.
