= Alex Chan (politician) =

Alex Chan Kai-chung (Chinese: 陳啟宗) is the former leader of the Citizens Party of Hong Kong.

Party political offices
Preceded by Christine Loh	Leader of the Citizens Party; 2000 – 2008	Party disbanded
