= Christine Loh =

Hong Kong politician

Dr Christine Loh SBS OBE JP Ordre national du Mérite
- 陸恭蕙
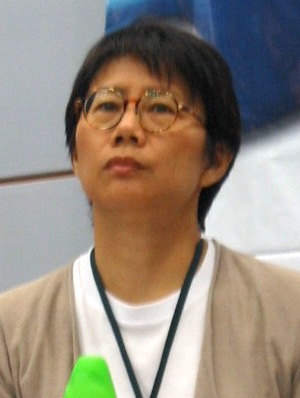
- Christine Loh Kung-wai at the CWMC 2006.

Member of the Legislative Council
- In office 1 July 1998 – 30 June 2000
- Preceded by: New parliament
- Succeeded by: Seat abolished
- Constituency: Hong Kong Island
- In office 11 October 1995 – 30 June 1997
- Constituency: Hong Kong Island Central
- Majority: 12,762 (30.7%)
- In office 8 October 1992 – 31 July 1995
- Appointed by: Chris Patten

Personal details
- Born: 1 February 1956 (age 70) British Hong Kong
- Party: Citizens Party (defunct)
- Education: St. Paul's Convent School; Island School; Bedford High School
- Alma mater: University of Hull (LLB); City University of Hong Kong (LLM)

Christine Loh
- Traditional Chinese: 陸恭蕙
- Simplified Chinese: 陆恭蕙
Transcriptions
Standard Mandarin
- Hanyu Pinyin: Lù Gōnghùi
Yue: Cantonese
- Jyutping: luk^{6} gung^{1}-wai^{6}

Christine Loh Kung-wai, SBS, OBE, JP, Chevalier de l’Ordre National du Mérite (born 1 February 1956), is a former Hong Kong Legislative Councillor, founder and CEO of Civic Exchange, founder of the Citizens Party, and founder of Hong Kong Human Rights Monitor. From 2012 to 2017, she was Under Secretary for the Environment in the government of CY Leung. From April 2019 to March 2020, she was Special Consultant to the HKSAR Chief Executive of Ecological Civilization and the Greater Bay Area, attached to the Policy Innovation and Co-ordination Office.

Until her appointment as Undersecretary for the Environment, Loh was CEO of Civic Exchange, the Hong Kong think tank that she co-founded in 2000. She received many awards, including "Stars of Asia" in 1998 and again in 2000 by BusinessWeek, "Hero of the Environment 2007" by Time and "Woman Who Makes a Difference 2009" by RBS Coutts/FT in Women of Asia Awards. She has worked in many areas, including law, business, politics, media and the non-profit sector, but is best known as a leading voice in public policy in Hong Kong, particularly in environmental protection, sustainable finance, and governance reform.

In 2017, following the end of her official role, she became an adjunct professor in the Division of Environment and Sustainability at the Hong Kong University of Science and Technology, and is also Chief Development Strategist at its Institute for the Environment. In 2019 Loh released the second edition of her book Underground Front: The Chinese Communist Party in Hong Kong, first published in 2010.

Starting in 2018, Loh has been teaching a course on non market risks at the Anderson School of Management at the University of California, Los Angeles.

== Education and professional career ==
Loh attended St. Paul's Convent School in Causeway Bay, and later Island School in Mid-levels, Hong Kong. She then went to Bedford High School in the UK. She later attended the University of Hull, and City University of Hong Kong (Masters of Law in Chinese & Comparative Law) and the University of Hull (Doctor of Law, honoris causa).

Loh worked for 12 years as a commodities trader (1980–1991), rising to become managing director at Philipp Brothers and Phibro Energy — the physical commodities trading arms of US multinational Salomon, Inc. (now Citicorp) — before joining a Hong Kong company (CIM Co.), where she headed the special projects division between 1992 and 1994. In April 2006, she was elected by shareholders of the Hong Kong Exchanges and Clearing (HKEx) to be a director of the company and served till 2009.

== Political career ==
Loh was appointed to the Legislative Council (LegCo) in 1992. In 1995 Hong Kong legislative election and 1998 Hong Kong legislative election she ran in two direct elections and won by large margins. She co-founded, in 1995, the Society for Protection of the Harbour and was responsible for creating and sponsoring the historic Protection of the Harbour Ordinance. While part of the democratic camp in LegCo, she took a less confrontational approach than some, preferring to keep open lines of communication with all sides. She has been described as Hong Kong's "reasonable radical".

In 2000, she and Lisa Hopkinson co-founded a Hong Kong-based non-profit think tank, Civic Exchange, and once again entered the political spotlight, but outside of the LegCo. She resigned as its chief executive on 11 September 2012 upon her appointment as Undersecretary for the Environment in the administration of CY Leung, taking up her new post the following day. At the same time, she resigned from all her positions in other non-profit organizations, academic affiliations, and non-executive directorships in commercial firms.

As Undersecretary for the Environment, Loh was responsible for drafting policy documents, including on air quality, energy, and climate change. She was responsible for stakeholder engagement in such matters as biodiversity and energy saving in buildings. Loh was also responsible for changing Hong Kong's shipping emissions regulation, which resulted in mainland China changing its policy, as well as playing a crucial role in ending the local trading of ivory. She left the government at the end of CY Leung's term, on 30 June 2017.

== Other activities ==
From the 1980s, Loh is a published author of many academic and popular works, she hosted a public affairs radio program at one time, and is an Op-Ed writer and presenter and speaker on the environment, climate change, green finance, as well as geopolitics, such as US-China relations.

== Affiliations ==
- Chairperson, Hong Kong Observers, 1980s
- Chairperson, Friends of the Earth (HK), 1991–1992; 1993–1994
- Chairperson, Citizens Party (HK), 1997–2000
- Chairperson, Society for Protection of the Harbour, 2003-200?
- Council Member, Hong Kong University of Science and Technology, 1999–2005
- Honorary Research Fellow, Centre of Urban Planning and Environmental Management, University of Hong Kong, 2001–2005
- Member, Advisory Committee, Securities and Futures Commission, 2001–2005
- Chief Executive, Civic Exchange, 2000–2012
- Chairperson, Society for Protection of the Harbour, 2003–2012
- Co-chair, Human Rights in China, 2005–2012

== Publications ==
- At the Epicentre: Hong Kong and the SARS Outbreak (book), Hong Kong University Press, 2004.
- Underground Front: The Chinese Communist Party in Hong Kong (book), Hong Kong University Press, 2010, 1st edition; and 2nd edition (2018).
- No Third Person: Rewriting the Hong Kong Story (book, co-written with Richard Cullen), Abbreviated Press, 2018. An extended version of the book (“Hong Kong in China” has been published in Chinese by City University of Hong Kong Press in 2021).

== Awards ==
- Outstanding Young Person’s Award 1988
- Communicator of the Year, 1994
- Stars of Asia, Businessweek, 1998
- Stars of Asia, Businessweek, 2000
- Entrepreneur of the Year (Women of Influence Award, The American Chamber of Commerce, Hong Kong, 2003)
- Honorary degree from University of Exeter (15 July 2016), for her contribution to environmental protection
- Silver Bauhinia Star by the Hong Kong SAR Government (1 July 2017)

Legislative Council of Hong Kong
Preceded by Man Sai-cheong as Representative for Hong Kong Island East	Member of Legislative Council; Representative for Hong Kong Island Central; 1995–1997	Replaced by Provisional Legislative Council
New parliament	Member of Legislative Council; Representative for Hong Kong Island; 1998–2000; Served alongside: Martin Lee, Yeung Sum, Gary Cheng	Succeeded by Cyd Ho
Government offices
Preceded by Kitty Poon	Under Secretary for the Environment; 2012–2017	Succeeded by CW Tse
Party political offices
New political party	Leader of the Citizens Party; 1997–2000	Succeeded by Alex Chan
Order of precedence
Preceded by Florence Hui; Under Secretary for Home Affairs	Hong Kong order of precedence Under Secretary for the Environment	Succeeded by Yau Shing-mu; Under Secretary for Transport and Housing
