= Citizens Party (Hong Kong) =

Citizens Party 民權黨
- Founder: Christine Loh
- Founded: 4 May 1997
- Dissolved: 9 May 2008
- Ideology: Liberalism (HK); Environmentalism
- Political position: Centre-left
- Regional affiliation: Pro-democracy camp
- Colours: Black and green

Citizens Party (Chinese: 民權黨) was a small pro-democracy political party existed in Hong Kong from 1997 to 2008. It was founded by Legislative Council member Christine Loh in May 1997.

== Beliefs ==
Being part of the pro-democracy camp, the Citizens Party demanded democratisation with the ultimate aims of universal suffrage which was stated in the Hong Kong Basic Law. However, it claimed to be more creative and less confrontational than the Democratic Party in seeking democratic reform and emphasised the importance of dialogue with the Beijing officials. In general, the party believed in an accountable government with representative democracy under rule of law, that would protect citizens' personal freedoms and equal opportunity, as well as promote tolerance and personal responsibility. In economic policies, the Citizens Party believed that free-market principles could best respond to change and provide choice. However, it also demanded proper regulation where there is an overriding public interest, such as to ensure fair competition.

The Citizens Party differentiated itself from other parties by stressing on anti-discrimination and minority issues and was particularly concerned with environmental protection. The Chairwoman Christine Loh was famous for her campaign on legislation and implementation of the Protection of the Harbour Ordinance, to ban any reclamation in the Victoria Harbour. It also opposed government's proposal of building a prison on Hei Ling Chau Island. It also stressed the women's rights, anti-discrimination and minority issues, such as demand for legislation against racial and sexual orientation discriminations.

== History ==
Alternate version of the party logo

It was officially founded on 4 May 1997 by 14 pro-democracy individuals on the eve of the handover of Hong Kong. Its first chair, Christine Loh Kung-wai, was a legislative council member elected in 1995. Loh proposed the legislation of the Protection of the Harbour Ordinance to prevent excessive harbour reclamation, which was passed in June 1997. The Provisional Legislative Council (PLC) controlled by the pro-Beijing politicians was asked by the SAR government to freeze the Ordinance. Loh and the Society for Protection of the Harbour eventually successfully lobbied the provisional legislature not to freeze the law.

Loh returned to the legislative council in the 1998 legislative council election in the Hong Kong Island, despite another party's candidate Mozart Lui Yat-ming lost in the New Territories East. After Loh decided not to run for the 2000 LegCo election and resigned as chair before the election, the Citizens Party became less active in the political arena without representation in the legislative council. However, the party continued to express views in various issues.

In the 1999 District Council elections, the party won a seat in the Heng Fa Chuen constituency. In the 2003 District Council elections, its then chairman, Alex Chan Kai-chung, unsuccessfully ran for a seat in the Lamma and Po Toi constituency.

The party officially wound itself up in December 2008, under Section 21 of the Companies Ordinance.

== List of chairs ==
- Christine Loh, 1997–2000
- Alex Chan, 2000–2008

== Election performance ==
=== Legislative Council elections ===
| Election | Number of popular votes | % of popular votes | GC seats | FC seats | EC seats | Total seats | +/− |
|---|---|---|---|---|---|---|---|
| 1998 | 41,633 | 2.81 | 1 | 0 | 0 | 1 / 60 | —N/a |

=== District Council elections ===
| Election | Number of popular votes | % of popular votes | Total elected seats | +/− |
|---|---|---|---|---|
| 1999 | 2,072 | 0.26 | 1 / 390 | 0 |
| 2003 | 361▼ | 0.03▼ | 0 / 400 | 1▼ |
