= Cheung Hon-chung =

Cheung Hon-chung 張漢忠

Member of the Provisional Legislative Council
- In office 21 December 1996 – 30 June 1998

Member of the Legislative Council
- In office 11 October 1995 – 30 June 1997
- Constituency: New Territories North

Personal details
- Born: 25 May 1958 (age 68) Hong Kong
- Party: Liberal Democratic Federation (1990s); Democratic Alliance for the Betterment and Progress of Hong Kong
- Children: 2 sons
- Occupation: Teacher

Cheung Hon-chung (born 25 May 1958, Hong Kong) was the member of the Legislative Council in 1995–97 for New Territories North, which was the only two of the 20 geographical constituency seats the pro-Beijing Democratic Alliance for the Betterment of Hong Kong in the 1995 Legislative Council Election. In the 1998 Election, he was placed second on list behind Lau Kong-wah in New Territories East and was not able to be reelected to the LegCo. He joined the Provisional Legislative Council existed from 1996 to 98. He was also the North District Board member from 1982 to 85 and Regional Council member.

Legislative Council of Hong Kong
New parliament	Member of Provisional Legislative Council; 1997–1998	Replaced by Legislative Council
