= 1998 Hong Kong legislative election =

- 24 May 1998

All 60 seats to the Legislative Council 31 seats needed for a majority
- Registered: 2,795,371 (GC)
- Turnout: 1,489,705 (53.29%)
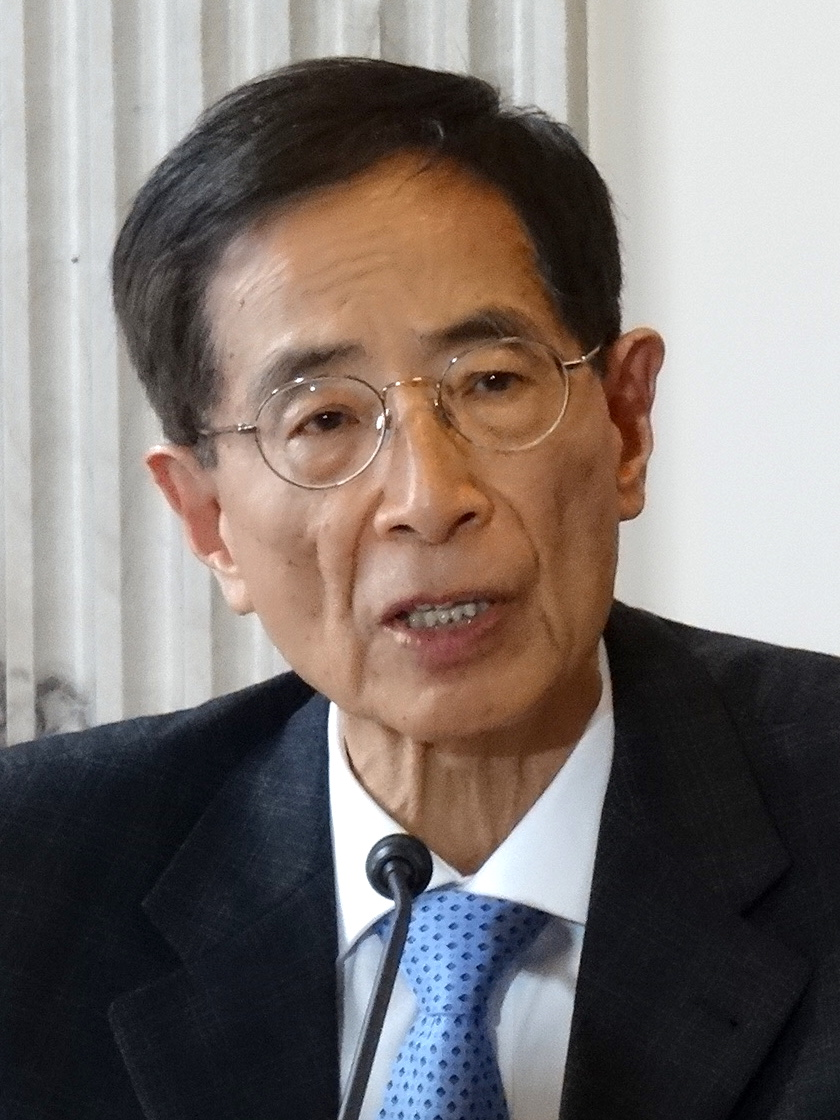

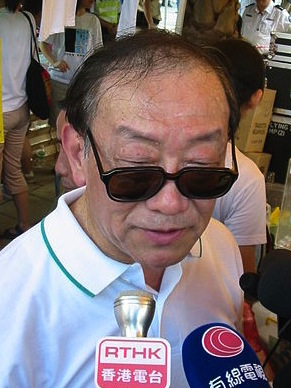

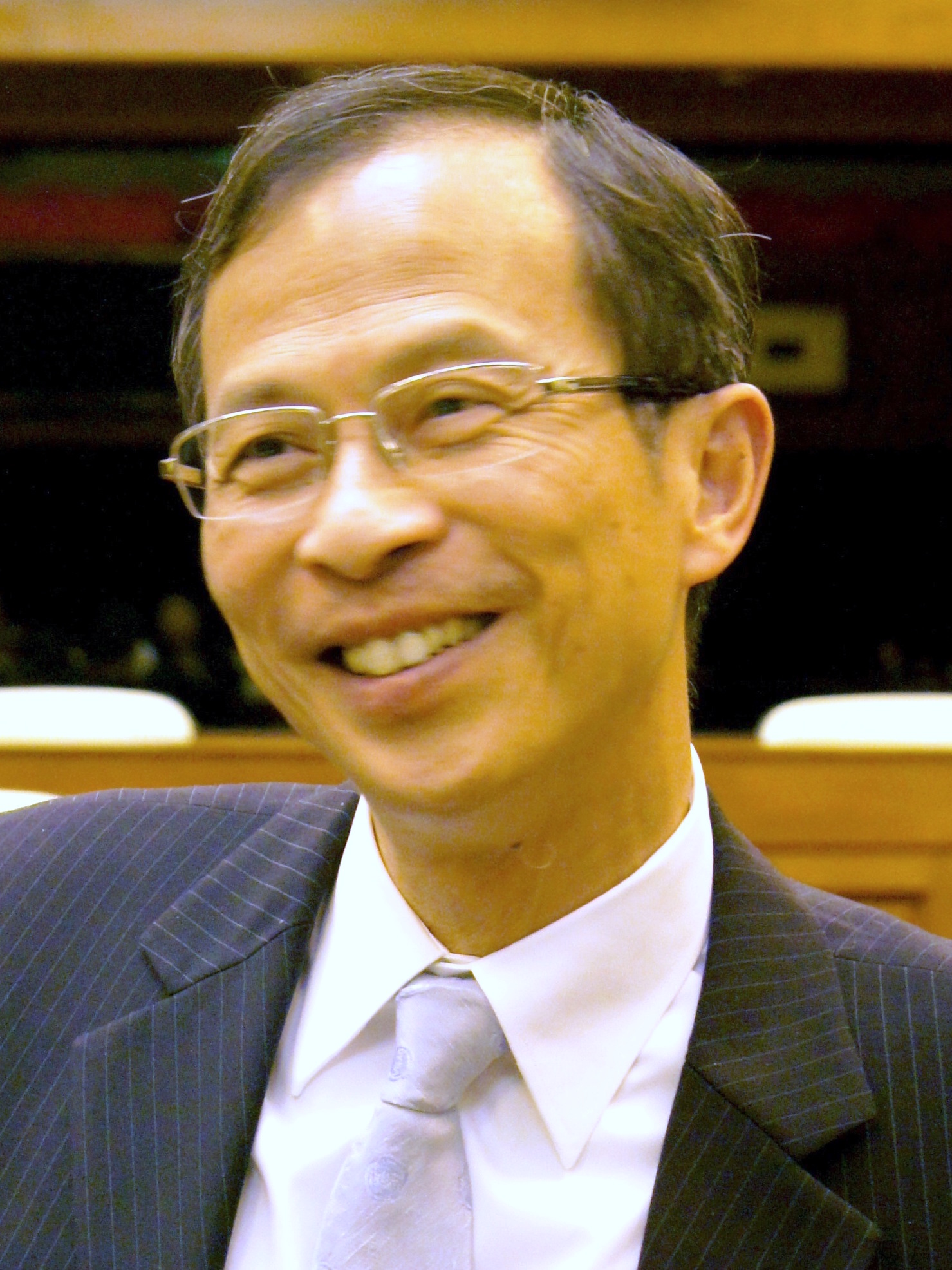

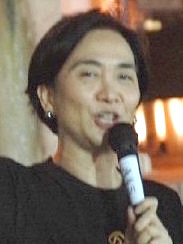

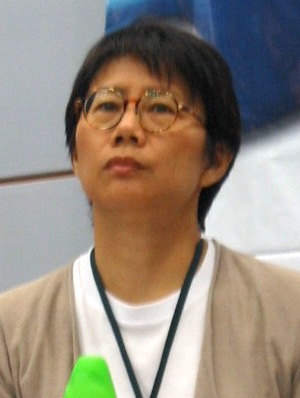
	First party	Second party	Third party
Leader	Martin Lee	Allen Lee	Tsang Yok-sing
Party	Democratic	Liberal	DAB
Alliance	Pan-democracy	Pro-Beijing	Pro-Beijing
Leader's seat	Hong Kong Island	New Territories East (defeated)	Kowloon West
Last election	19 seats, 42.26%	10 seats, 1.64%	6 seats, 15.66%
Seats won	13	10	9
Popular vote	634,635	50,335	373,428
Percentage	42.87%	3.40%	25.23%
Swing	▲0.61pp	▲1.76pp	▲9.57pp
	Fourth party	Fifth party	Sixth party
Leader	Ambrose Lau	Emily Lau	Christine Loh
Party	HKPA	Frontier	Citizens
Alliance	Pro-Beijing	Pan-democracy	Pan-democracy
Leader's seat	Election Committee	New Territories East	Hong Kong Island
Last election	1 seat, 2.85%	Did not contest	Did not contest
Seats won	5	3	1
Popular vote	Did not run in GCs	148,507	41,633
Percentage	N/A	10.03%	2.81%
Swing	N/A	New party	New party
- Elected candidates by each constituency
Party control before election
Pro-Beijing camp
Party control after election
Pro-Beijing camp

The 1998 Hong Kong Legislative Council election was held on 24 May 1998 for members of the 1st Legislative Council of Hong Kong (LegCo) since the establishment of the Hong Kong Special Administrative Region (HKSAR) in 1997. Replacing the Provisional Legislative Council (PLC) strictly controlled by the Beijing government and boycotted by the pro-democracy camp, the elections returned 20 members from directly elected geographical constituencies, 10 seats from the Election Committee constituency and 30 members from functional constituencies, of which 10 were uncontested.

Taking the advantage of the proportional representation system installed by Beijing, the pro-Beijing party, the Democratic Alliance for the Betterment of Hong Kong (DAB), the weaker side compared to the more developed pro-democratic party, the Democratic Party recorded a clearer increase in the number of seats in the election.

The Democratic Party returned to the Legislative Council as the largest party with 13 seats, while the Association for Democracy and People's Livelihood, a pro-democratic party joined. The Beijing-controlled Provisional Legislative Council lost all its seats.

== Electoral method ==
The electoral method for the first Hong Kong Special Administrative Region was crafted by the Provisional Legislative Council (PLC) installed by the Beijing government during the intense Sino-British confrontation over the democratic reform carried out by the last colonial governor Chris Patten. According to the Hong Kong Basic Law promulgated by Beijing in April 1990, the first legislature would be composed of 60 members, with 20 members returned by geographical constituencies through direct elections, 10 members returned by an election committee and 30 members returned by functional constituencies.

For the geographical constituencies, A proportional representation system was adopted by the SAR government in replacement of the first-past-the-post system introduced in 1995. Under the system Hong Kong was divided into five large districts instead of 20 small ones, with voters in each district choosing three to five persons from candidate lists. It was designed to reward the weaker pro-Beijing candidates and dilute the electoral strength of the majority democrats.

For the functional constituencies, the corporate voting was restored after it was abolished in 1995. It reduced the number of eligible voters by almost 90 percent, from over 1.1 million in 1995 to fewer than 140,000 in 1998. There were also vast disparities in the number of eligible voters among the functional constituencies, ranging from highs of approximately 50,000 in the Education constituency to a few hundred or less in the Agriculture and Fisheries Transport, Insurance, Urban Council and Regional Council constituencies.

For the election committee, the 10 seats would be elected by the 800-member Election Committee, successor to the 400-member Selection Committee which elected the SAR's first Chief Executive in 1996. The committee was predominantly composed of conservative, pro-Beijing business, industrial and professional elites.

== Campaign ==
The proportional representation system induced the contesting parties to practice strategic voting, effectively turning what would have been otherwise a proportional electoral system into single non-transferable vote, to encourage split voting among their supporters. In New Territories East, Martin Lee's Democratic Party reportedly advised its supporters to split their family members' votes between the Democratic Party and its ally The Frontier to help ensure of a third pro-democracy candidate. In Hong Kong Island, the Democratic Party picked a relatively unknown candidate in the third place of its party list, a move reportedly intended to help Christine Loh of the pro-democratic Citizens Party to finish ahead of the second candidate Ip Kwok-him of the rival pro-Beijing Democratic Alliance for the Betterment of Hong Kong (DAB).

== Results ==
=== Overview ===
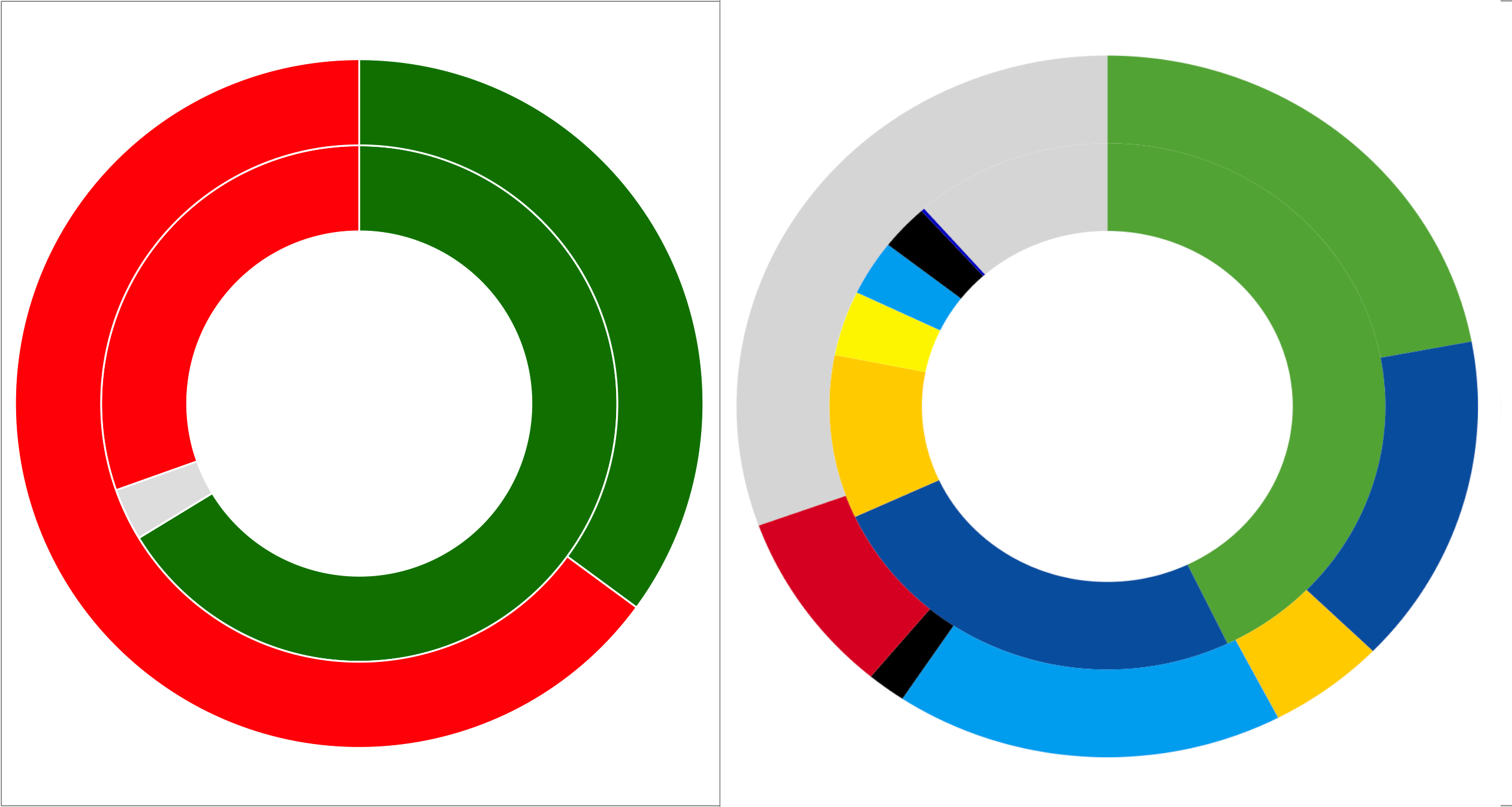
Ring charts of the election results showing popular vote against seats won, coloured in green (Pro-democracy camp) and red (Pro-Beijing camp) on the left and the party colours on the right. Seats won in the election (outer ring) against number of votes (inner ring).

The results saw the pro-democratic camp once again collectively gain over 60 percent of the popular vote, but their share of directly elected seats shrink form 85 percent (17/20) to 65 percent (14/20), due to the new electoral system. The leading pro-Beijing party, the Democratic Alliance for the Betterment of Hong Kong (DAB) which had suffered from the underrepresentation under the single-member plurality system, picked up one seat in each geographical constituency for its 25 percent share of the popular vote. The Association for Democracy and People's Livelihood (ADPL), a pro-democratic party joined the Beijing-controlled Provisional Legislative Council lost all its seats, while two other pro-democratic parties, The Frontier and Citizens Party won 3 and 1 seat respectively.

The pro-business Liberal Party won most seats in the functional constituencies by taking 9 seats in the trade-based sectors, but failed to win any seat in the geographical constituency direct election. Its chairman Allen Lee could not save his seat in New Territories East which he won in the 1995 election. Some 77,813 voters (65 percent of those eligible) cast votes in the 20 functional constituencies while ten others ran uncontested. Reflecting the built-in conservative bias in the majority of the functional constituencies, pro-government parties and their unaffiliated allies dominated the sectors. Due to the pro-Beijing composition of the Election Committee, the pro-Beijing candidates won all 10 seats in the sector.

Overall Summary of the 24 May 1998 Legislative Council of Hong Kong election results
Parties	Geographical constituencies			Functional constituencies			ECC seats	Total seats
Parties	Votes	%	Seats	Votes	%	Seats	ECC seats	Total seats
Liberal Party	50,335	3.40	0	1,316	1.73	9	1	10
Democratic Alliance for the Betterment of Hong Kong	373,428	25.23	5	293	0.38	2	2	9
Hong Kong Progressive Alliance	−	−	−	430	0.56	2	3	5
Pro-government individuals and others	25,905	1.75	0	22,442	29.44	12	4	16
Total for pro-Beijing camp	449,668	30.38	5	24,481	32.11	25	10	40
Democratic Party	634,635	42.87	9	48,085	63.07	4	–	13
The Frontier	148,507	10.03	3	–	–	–	–	3
Citizens Party	41,633	2.81	1	–	–	–	–	1
Hong Kong Association for Democracy and People's Livelihood	59,034	3.99	0	0	0.00	0	0	0
123 Democratic Alliance	3,050	0.21	0	−	−	–	–	0
Pro-democracy individuals and others	95,390	6.44	2	1,889	2.48	1	0	3
Total for pro-democracy camp	982,249	66.36	15	49,974	65.55	5	0	20
Individuals and others	48,323	3.26	0	1,781	2.34	0	0	0
Total	1,480,240	100.00	20	76,236	100.00	30	10	60
Valid votes	1,480,240	99.36		76,236	97.97			
Invalid votes	9,465	0.64		1,577	2.13			
Vote cast / turnout	1,489,705	53.29		77,813	63.50			
Registered voters	2,795,371	100.00		122,540	100.00			
10 candidates in 10 functional constituencies were elected unopposed to the Legislative Council.

(Total votes added up by this reference)

=== Vote summary ===
Popular vote
Democratic	42.87%
DAB	25.23%
Frontier	10.03%
ADPL	3.99%
Liberal	3.40%
Citizens	2.81%
123DA	0.21%
Independents	11.45%

=== Seat summary ===
Seats
Democratic	21.67%
Liberal	16.67%
DAB	15.00%
PA	8.33%
Frontier	5.00%
Citizens	1.67%
Independents	31.67%

== Result breakdown ==
=== Geographical constituencies (20 seats) ===
Voting System: Closed party-list proportional representation with the Largest remainder method and Hare Quota.

Hong Kong Island (4 seats)

List №	Party/ Allegiance	Votes Received	%	Elected	Not elected
1	Citizens	39,251	12.76	Christine Loh Kung-wai	
2	Nonpartisan	12,377	4.02		Chong Chan-yau
3	DAB	90,182	29.32	Gary Cheng Kai-nam	Ip Kwok-him, Suen Kai-cheong, Christopher Chung Shu-kun
4	Liberal	7,485	2.43		Ada Wong Ying-kay, Alice Tso Shing-yuk, Alice Lam Chui-lin
5	Democratic	143,843	46.76	Martin Lee Chu-ming, Yeung Sum	Yuen Bun-keung, Chan Kwok-leung
6	Nonpartisan	2,588	0.84		Louis Leung Wing-on
7	Nonpartisan	10,950	3.56		Jennifer Chow Kit-bing
8	Nonpartisan	935	0.30		Li Hung
Total		307,611	100.00		

Kowloon West (3 seats)

List №	Party/ Allegiance	Votes Received	%	Elected	Not elected
1	Democratic	113,079	55.05	Lau Chin-shek, James To Kun-sun	Eric Wong Chong-ki
2	ADPL	39,534	19.25		Frederick Fung Kin-kee, Liu Sing-lee, Tam Kwok-kiu
3	Atlas Alliance	2,302	1.12		Helen Chung Yee-fong
4	Liberal	5,854	2.85		Chiang Sai-cheong, Chan Noi-yue, Edward Li King-wah
5	DAB	44,632	21.73	Jasper Tsang Yok-sing	Ip Kwok-chung, Wen Choy-bon
Total		205,401	100.00		

Kowloon East (3 seats)

List №	Party/ Allegiance	Votes Received	%	Elected	Not elected
1	Democratic	145,986	55.80	Szeto Wah, Li Wah-ming	Mak Hoi-wah
2	DAB	109,296	41.78	Chan Yuen-han	Kwok Bit-chun, Lam Man-fai
3	Nonpartisan	6,339	2.42		Fok Pui-yee
Total		261,621	100.00		

New Territories West (5 seats)

List №	Party/ Allegiance	Votes Received	%	Elected	Not elected
1	Democratic	147,098	39.21	Lee Wing-tat, Ho Chun-yan	Zachary Wong Wai-yin, Josephine Chan Shu-ying
2	Nonpartisan	25,905	6.91		Lam Wai-keung, Tai Kuen, Chow Ping-tim, Carmen Chan Ka-mun, Tso Shiu-wai
3	Nonpartisan	38,627	10.30	Leung Yiu-chung	
4	Frontier	46,696	12.45	Lee Cheuk-yan	Ip Kwok-fun
5	Nonpartisan	11,176	2.98		Ting Yin-wah
6	Liberal	3,138	0.84		Paul Chan Sing-kong, Liu Kwong-sang, Wong Kwok-keung
7	DAB	72,587	19.35	Tam Yiu-chung	Leung Che-cheung, Chau Chuen-heung, Chan Wan-sang, Hui Chiu-fai
8	ADPL	19,500	5.20		Yim Tin-sang
9	Pioneer	968	0.26		Lam Chi-leung
10	123DA	3,050	0.81		Yum Sin-ling, Christopher Chu Cho-yan, Mak Ip-sing, Shung King-fai
11	Nonpartisan	6428	1.71		Yeung Fuk-kwong
Total		375,173	100.00		

New Territories East (5 seats)

List №	Party/ Allegiance	Votes Received	%	Elected	Not elected
1	Liberal	33,858	10.25		Allen Lee Peng-fei, Wong Yiu-chee, Cheng Chee-kwok
2	Nonpartisan	44,386	13.43	Andrew Wong Wang-fat	
3	Citizens	2,382	0.72		Lui Yat-ming
4	Frontier	101,811	30.81	Emily Lau Wai-hing, Cyd Ho Sau-lan	
5	DAB	56,731	17.17	Lau Kong-wah	Cheung Hon-chung, Chan Ping, Wan Yuet-kau, Wong Mo-tai
6	Democratic	84,629	25.61	Andrew Cheng Kar-foo	Wong Sing-chi, Lam Wing-yin, Shirley Ho Suk-ping
7	Nonpartisan	6,637	2.01		Brian Kan Ping-chee
Total		330,434	100.00		

=== Functional Constituencies (30 seats) ===
Voting systems: Different voting systems apply to different functional constituencies, namely for the Heung Yee Kuk, Agriculture and Fisheries, Insurance and Transport, the preferential elimination system of voting; and for the remaining 24 FCs used the first-past-the-post voting system.

Constituency	Candidate(s)	Affiliation	Votes	%
Urban Council	Ambrose Cheung Wing-sum	Independent	26	56.52
Urban Council	Ronnie Wong Man-chiu	Nonpartisan	20	43.48
Urban Council	Mok Ying-fan	ADPL	0	0.00
Regional Council	Tang Siu-tong	Nonpartisan (PA)	25	51.02
Regional Council	Chiang Lai-wan	Nonpartisan	24	48.98
Regional Council	Ngan Kam-chuen	DAB	0	0.00
Heung Yee Kuk	Lau Wong-fat	Nonpartisan (Liberal)	Uncontested	
Agriculture and Fisheries	Wong Yung-kan	Nonpartisan (DAB)	81	65.32
Agriculture and Fisheries	Lawrence Lee Hay-yue	Nonpartisan	43	34.68
Insurance	Bernard Charnwut Chan	Nonpartisan	94	53.11
Insurance	Chan Yim-kwong	Liberal	83	46.89
Insurance	Alex Wong Po-hang	Nonpartisan	0	0.00
Insurance	Steven Lau Hon-keung	Nonpartisan	0	0.00
Transport	Miriam Lau Kin-yee	Liberal	82	69.49
Transport	Yuen Mo	Nonpartisan	36	30.51
Education	Cheung Man-kwong	Democratic	34,864	70.89
Education	Li Sze-yuen	Nonpartisan	5,319	29.11
Legal	Margaret Ng Ngoi-yee	Nonpartisan	1,741	81.55
Legal	Sylvia Siu Wing-yee	Nonpartisan	394	18.45
Accountancy	Eric Li Ka-cheung	Independent	3,556	65.04
Accountancy	Edward Chow Kwong-fai	Nonpartisan	1,302	23.82
Accountancy	Peter Chan Po-fun	Nonpartisan	609	11.14
Medical	Edward Leong Che-hung	Nonpartisan	2,759	70.19
Medical	Chan Ki-tak	Independent	1,172	29.81
Health Services	Michael Ho Mun-ka	Democratic	11,420	82.21
Health Services	Peter Chua Sek-chon	Nonpartisan	2,472	17.79
Engineering	Raymond Ho Chung-tai	Nonpartisan	2,036	55.95
Engineering	Wong King-keung	Independent	1,112	30.56
Engineering	Luk Wang-kwong	Nonpartisan	491	13.49
Architectural, Surveying and Planning	Edward Ho Sing-tin	Liberal	Uncontested	
Labour (3 seats)	Chan Wing-chan	DAB	212	27.32
Labour (3 seats)	Lee Kai-ming	Nonpartisan	212	27.32
Labour (3 seats)	Chan Kwok-keung	Nonpartisan	204	26.29
Labour (3 seats)	Chan Yun-che	Nonpartisan	99	12.76
Labour (3 seats)	Ng Yat-wah	Nonpartisan	49	6.31
Social Welfare	Law Chi-kwong	Democratic	Uncontested	
Real Estate and Construction	Ronald Joseph Arculli	Liberal	206	69.13
Real Estate and Construction	Jimmy Tse Lai-leung	Nonpartisan	92	30.87
Tourism	Howard Young	Liberal	Uncontested	
Commercial (First)	James Tien Pei-chun	Liberal	Uncontested	
Commercial (Second)	Wong Yu-hong	Nonpartisan	Uncontested	
Industrial (First)	Kenneth Ting	Liberal	Uncontested	
Industrial (Second)	Lui Ming-wah	Nonpartisan	186	63.48
Industrial (Second)	Ngai Shiu-kit	HKPA	107	36.52
Finance	David Li Kwok-po	Independent	Uncontested	
Financial Services	Chim Pui-chung	Nonpartisan	125	40.85
Financial Services	Fung Chi-kin	Nonpartisan	117	38.24
Financial Services	Wu King-cheong	HKPA	47	15.36
Financial Services	Syed Bagh Ali Sah Bokhary	Nonpartisan	17	5.56
Sports, Performing Arts, Culture and Publication	Timothy Fok Tsun-ting	Nonpartisan	561	68.50
Sports, Performing Arts, Culture and Publication	Wu Chi-wai	Democratic	258	31.50
Import and Export	Hui Cheung-ching	HKPA	Uncontested	
Textiles and Garment	Sophie Leung Lau Yau-fun	Liberal	Uncontested	
Whole and Retail	Selina Chow Liang Shuk-yee	Liberal	945	66.41
Whole and Retail	Wong Siu-yee	HKPA	276	19.40
Whole and Retail	Chan Choi-hi	Nonpartisan	202	14.20
Information Technology	Sin Chung-kai	Democratic	1,543	63.71
Information Technology	Yung Kai-ning	Nonpartisan	456	18.83
Information Technology	Ringo Chan Kei-fu	Nonpartisan	423	17.46

=== Election Committee (10 seats) ===
Party	Candidate	Votes	%
DAB	Yeung Yiu-chung	441	56.90
Nonpartisan	Lee Kwong-lam	83	10.71
DAB	Thomas Pang Cheung-wai	226	29.16
Nonpartisan	Ng Leung-sing	539	69.55
Liberal	Ho Sai-chu	386	49.81
Nonpartisan	Ma Fung-kwok	466	60.13
Nonpartisan	Kan Fook-yee	300	38.71
Nonpartisan	James Chiu	141	18.19
Independent	Peggy Lam Pei	346	44.65
HKPA	Charles Yeung Chun-kam	380	49.03
Nonpartisan	Rita Fan Hsu Lai-tai	628	81.03
Nonpartisan	Ng Ching-fai	530	68.39
Nonpartisan	Maria Joyce Chang Sau-han	149	19.23
Nonpartisan	Ho Ka-cheong	97	12.52
ADPL	Law Cheung-kwok	259	33.42
Nonpartisan	Cheung Hok-ming	273	35.23
Nonpartisan	Siu See-kong	56	7.23
Heung Yee Kuk	Pang Hang-yin	212	27.35
HKPA	David Chu Yu-lin	469	60.52
Nonpartisan	Stephen Yam Chi-ming	137	17.68
DAB	Chan Kam-lam	432	55.74
Nonpartisan	Joseph Hui Tak-fai	214	27.61
HKPA	Choy So-yuk	397	51.23
Nonpartisan	Leung Tsz-leung	85	10.97
HKPA	Lau Hon-chuen	504	65.03

== Implication ==
The 1998 election is the first election after the Handover in 1997. Some observers believed the generally free and fair election was crucial for the consolidation of the newly established HKSAR and the political setting of "one country, two systems" after widespread criticism on the PLC.
