= 2015 Central and Western District Council election =

Hong Kong local election

- 22 November 2015

All 15 seats to Central and Western District Council 8 seats needed for a majority
- Turnout: 46.3%
| | First party | Second party | Third party |
|---|---|---|---|
| Party | DAB | Democratic | Liberal |
| Last election | 5 seats, 24.7% | 4 seats, 30.1% | 1 seat, 3.6% |
| Seats before | 5 | 4 | 1 |
| Seats won | 6 | 4 | 1 |
| Seat change | ▲1 | Steady | Steady |
| Popular vote | 11,381 | 13,401 | 3,148 |
| Percentage | 23.8% | 28.0% | 6.6% |
| Swing | ▼0.9% | ▼2.1% | ▲3.0% |
- Colours on map indicate winning party for each constituency.

The 2015 Central and Western District Council election was held on 22 November 2015 to elect all 15 members of the Central and Western District Council.

== Overall election results ==
Before election:

↓
| 4 | 11 |
| Pro-dem | Pro-Beijing |

Change in composition:

↓
| 4 | 11 |
| Pro-dem | Pro-Beijing |

Central and Western District Council election result 2015
| Party | Seats | Gains | Losses | Net gain/loss | Seats % | Votes % | Votes | +/− |
|---|---|---|---|---|---|---|---|---|
| DAB | 6 | 1 | 0 | +1 | 40.0 | 23.8 | 11,381 | –0.9 |
| Independent | 4 | 0 | 1 | –1 | 26.7 | 36.6 | 17,476 | |
| Democratic | 4 | 1 | 1 | 0 | 26.7 | 28.0 | 13,401 | –2.1 |
| Liberal | 1 | 0 | 0 | 0 | 6.7 | 6.6 | 3,148 | +3.0 |
| Youngspiration | 0 | 0 | 0 | 0 | 0 | 5.0 | 2,407 | |

== Results by constituency ==
=== Belcher ===
Belcher
| Party | Candidate | Votes | % | ±% |
|---|---|---|---|---|
| Nonpartisan | Yip Wing-shing | 2,397 | 50.7 | |
| Democratic | Victor Yeung Sui-yin | 2,328 | 49.3 | +2.2 |
| Majority | | 69 | 1.4 | –3.5 |
| Independent gain from Independent | | Swing | | |

=== Castle Road ===
Castle Road
| Party | Candidate | Votes | % | ±% |
|---|---|---|---|---|
| Democratic | Cheng Lai-king | 1,457 | 52.6 | –6.8 |
| Liberal | Ng lung-fei | 1,311 | 47.4 | |
| Majority | | 146 | 5.2 | –13.6 |
| Democratic hold | | Swing | | |

=== Centre Street ===
Centre Street
| Party | Candidate | Votes | % | ±% |
|---|---|---|---|---|
| Nonpartisan | Sidney Lee Chi-hang | 1,654 | 50.5 | –9.3 |
| Democratic | Cheung Kai-yin | 1,621 | 49.5 | |
| Majority | | 33 | 1.0 | –17.4 |
| Independent hold | | Swing | | |

=== Chung Wan ===
Chung Wan
| Party | Candidate | Votes | % | ±% |
|---|---|---|---|---|
| Democratic | Hui Chi-fung | 1,090 | 53.7 | +2.2 |
| Nonpartisan | Vienna Lau Wai-yan | 940 | 46.3 | |
| Majority | | 150 | 7.4 | –0.8 |
| Democratic hold | | Swing | | |

=== Kennedy Town & Mount Davis ===
Kennedy Town & Mount Davis
| Party | Candidate | Votes | % | ±% |
|---|---|---|---|---|
| DAB | Chan Hok-fung | 1,859 | 49.3 | –4.7 |
| Democratic | Sin Cheuk-nam | 1,072 | 28.4 | –7.6 |
| Youngspiration | Chow Sai-kit | 838 | 22.2 | |
| Majority | | 787 | 20.9 | +12.9 |
| DAB hold | | Swing | | |

=== Kwun Lung ===
Kwun Lung
| Party | Candidate | Votes | % | ±% |
|---|---|---|---|---|
| DAB | Yeung Hoi-wing | 2,491 | 61.4 | –12.3 |
| Youngspiration | Sixtus Leung Chung-hang | 1,569 | 38.6 | |
| Majority | | 922 | 22.8 | –24.6 |
| DAB hold | | Swing | | |

=== Middle Levels East ===
Mid Levels East
| Party | Candidate | Votes | % | ±% |
|---|---|---|---|---|
| Democratic | Ng Siu-hong | 1,521 | 50.9 | +3.3 |
| Independent | Jackie Cheung Yick-hung | 1,466 | 49.1 | –8.9 |
| Majority | | 55 | 0.8 | –18.6 |
| Democratic gain from Independent | | Swing | +6.1 | |

=== Peak ===
Peak
| Party | Candidate | Votes | % | ±% |
|---|---|---|---|---|
| Liberal | Joseph Chan Ho-lim | 1,837 | 85.3 | +20.6 |
| Independent | Chan Shu-moon | 317 | 14.7 | |
| Majority | | 1,520 | 70.6 | +8.8 |
| Liberal hold | | Swing | | |

=== Sai Wan ===
Sai Wan
| Party | Candidate | Votes | % | ±% |
|---|---|---|---|---|
| DAB | Cheung Kwok-kwan | 2,011 | 51.4 | +1.0 |
| Democratic | Winfield Chong Wing-fai | 1,898 | 48.6 | –1.0 |
| Majority | | 113 | 1.8 | +1.0 |
| DAB hold | | Swing | +1.0 | |

=== Sai Ying Pun ===
Sai Ying Pun
| Party | Candidate | Votes | % | ±% |
|---|---|---|---|---|
| DAB | Lo Yee-hang | 1,790 | 59.8 | –7.8 |
| Nonpartisan | Ng Wing-tak | 1,204 | 40.2 | |
| Majority | | 586 | 19.6 | –22.4 |
| DAB hold | | Swing | | |

=== Shek Tong Tsui ===
Shek Tong Tsui
| Party | Candidate | Votes | % | ±% |
|---|---|---|---|---|
| Nonpartisan | Chan Choi-hi | 1,898 | 58.7 | –13.9 |
| Nonpartisan | Sam Yip Kam-lung | 1,336 | 41.3 | |
| Majority | | 562 | 17.4 | –27.8 |
| Independent hold | | Swing | | |

=== Sheung Wan ===
Sheung Wan
| Party | Candidate | Votes | % | ±% |
|---|---|---|---|---|
| Democratic | Kam Nai-wai | 1,436 | 51.7 | –3.4 |
| Independent | Lui Hung-pan | 1,344 | 48.3 | |
| Majority | | 92 | 3.4 | –17.1 |
| Democratic hold | | Swing | | |

=== Tung Wah ===
Tung Wah
| Party | Candidate | Votes | % | ±% |
|---|---|---|---|---|
| DAB | Siu Ka-yi | 1,352 | 58.0 | +4.9 |
| Democratic | Frederick Ho Chun-ki | 980 | 42.0 | +0.8 |
| Majority | | 372 | 16.0 | +4.1 |
| DAB hold | | Swing | | |

=== University ===
University
| Party | Candidate | Votes | % | ±% |
|---|---|---|---|---|
| Independent | Stephen Chan Chit-kwai | 1,844 | 55.9 | –24.5 |
| Independent | Edward Lau Wai-tak | 1,455 | 44.1 | |
| Majority | | 389 | 11.8 | –49.0 |
| Independent hold | | Swing | | |

=== Water Street ===
Water Street
| Party | Candidate | Votes | % | ±% |
|---|---|---|---|---|
| DAB | Yeung Hok-ming | 1,878 | 53.7 | +13.1 |
| Democratic | Bonnie Ng Hoi-yan | 1,619 | 46.3 | +2.0 |
| Majority | | 259 | 7.4 | +3.7 |
| DAB gain from Democratic | | Swing | | |
