= 2011 Central and Western District Council election =

Hong Kong local election

- 6 November 2011

15 (of the 18) seats to Central and Western District Council 10 seats needed for a majority
- Turnout: 40.0%
	First party	Second party	Third party
Party	DAB	Democratic	Liberal
Last election	3 seats, 25.5%	6 seats, 27.8%	1 seat, 1.9%
Seats before	3	6	0
Seats won	5	4	1
Seat change	▲2	▼2	▲1
Popular vote	10,383	12,624	1,505
Percentage	24.7%	30.1%	3.6%
Swing	▲0.8%	▲2.3%	▲1.7%
- Colours on map indicate winning party for each constituency.

The 2011 Central and Western District Council election was held in Central and Western District, Hong Kong on 6 November 2011 to elect all 15 elected members to the 18-member District Council.

The pro-Beijing Democratic Alliance for the Betterment and Progress of Hong Kong took over the Democratic Party as the largest party in the council, with the Democrats losing two seats by narrow margin in Belcher and Tung Wah. Civic Party's Tanya Chan the incumbent Legislative Councillor also lost her seat in Peak to Liberal Party's Joseph Chan Ho-lim.

== Overall election results ==
Before election:

↓
7	8
Pro-democracy	Pro-Beijing

Change in composition:

↓
4	11
Pro-dem	Pro-Beijing

Central and Western District Council election result 2011
Party	Seats	Gains	Losses	Net gain/loss	Seats %	Votes %	Votes	+/−
Independent	5	1	1	0	33.3	31.1	13,046	
Democratic	4	0	2	−2	26.7	30.1	12,624	+2.3
DAB	5	2	0	+2	33.3	24.7	10,383	+0.8
Liberal	1	1	0	+1	6.7	3.6	1,505	+1.7
LSD	0	0	0	0	0	3.6	1,503	
Land Justice League	0	0	0	0	0	2.9	1,199	
People Power	0	0	0	0	0	2.1	881	
Civic	0	0	1	−1	0	2.0	820	−0.2

== Results by constituency ==
=== Belcher ===
Belcher
Party	Candidate	Votes	%	±%
Independent	Malcolm Lam Wai-wing	1,968	48.0	N/A
Democratic	Victor Yeung Sui-yin	1,935	47.1	−5.6
People Power	William Wong Ka-lok	201	4.9	N/A
Majority		33	0.9	
Independent gain from Democratic		Swing		

=== Castle Road ===
Castle Road
Party	Candidate	Votes	%	±%
Democratic	Cheng Lai-king	1,291	59.4	−12.5
Independent	Pak Fu-hung	881	40.6	N/A
Majority		410	18.8	−25.0
Democratic hold		Swing		

=== Centre Street ===
Centre Street
Party	Candidate	Votes	%	±%
Independent	Sidney Lee Chi-hang	1,739	59.2	−5.8
Land Justice League	Wong Ho-yin	1,199	40.8	N/A
Majority		540	18.4	−11.6
Independent hold		Swing		

=== Chung Wan ===
Chung Wan
Party	Candidate	Votes	%	±%
Democratic	Hui Chi-fung	951	51.5	−10.1
Independent	Wai Pui-shuen	800	43.3	N/A
People Power (Power Voters)	So Ho	96	5.2	N/A
Majority		151	8.2	−14.5
Democratic hold		Swing	N/A	

=== Kennedy Town & Mount Davis ===
Kennedy Town & Mount Davis
Party	Candidate	Votes	%	±%
DAB	Chan Hok-fung	1,721	54.0	+5.0
Democratic	Bonnie Ng Hoi-yan	1,468	46.0	N/A
Majority		253	8.0	+1.1
DAB hold		Swing		

=== Kwun Lung ===
Kwun Lung
Party	Candidate	Votes	%	±%
DAB	Ip Kwok-him	2,723	73.7	−10.3
LSD	Leung Kwok-hung	973	26.3	N/A
Majority		1,800	47.4	−28.1
DAB hold		Swing	N/A	

=== Middle Levels East ===
Mid Levels East
Party	Candidate	Votes	%	±%
Independent	Jackie Cheung Yick-hung	1,432	58.0	+2.5
Democratic	Wilhelm Tang Wai-chung	927	37.6	N/A
Independent	Chan Pui-yi	108	4.4	N/A
Majority		505	20.4	+10.4
Independent hold		Swing	N/A	

=== Peak ===
Peak
Party	Candidate	Votes	%	±%
Liberal	Joseph Chan Ho-lim	1,505	64.7	+23.8
Civic	Tanya Chan	820	35.3	−12.6
Majority		685	29.4	+22.4
Liberal gain from Civic		Swing	+18.2	

=== Sai Wan ===
Sai Wan
Party	Candidate	Votes	%	±%
DAB	Cheung Kwok-kwan	1,655	50.4	N/A
Democratic	Winfield Chong Wing-fai	1,631	49.6	N/A
Majority		24	0.8	N/A
DAB gain from Independent		Swing		

=== Sai Ying Pun ===
Sai Ying Pun
Party	Candidate	Votes	%	±%
DAB	Lo Yee-hang	1,875	67.6	+6.3
Democratic	Yong Chak-cheong	711	25.6	N/A
People Power	Yuen Man-ho	189	6.8	N/A
Majority		1,164	42.0	+15.4
DAB hold		Swing	N/A	

=== Shek Tong Tsui ===
Shek Tong Tsui
Party	Candidate	Votes	%	±%
Independent	Chan Choi-hi	1,871	72.6	−2.6
Independent	Ching Ming-tat	705	27.4	
Majority		1,166	45.2	−1.5
Independent hold		Swing		

=== Sheung Wan ===
Sheung Wan
Party	Candidate	Votes	%	±%
Democratic	Kam Nai-wai	1,450	55.1	−14.2
Independent	Chan Yin-ho	910	34.6	N/A
People Power	Yim Tat-ming	270	10.3	N/A
Majority		540	20.5	−18.1
Democratic hold		Swing	N/A	

=== Tung Wah ===
Tung Wah
Party	Candidate	Votes	%	±%
DAB	Siu Ka-yi	1,168	53.1	+13.1
Democratic	Frederick Ho Chun-ki	907	41.2	−18.8
People Power	Lee Siu-cheong	125	5.7	N/A
Majority		261	11.9	
DAB gain from Democratic		Swing	+16.0	

=== University ===
University
Party	Candidate	Votes	%	±%
Independent	Stephen Chan Chit-kwai	2,169	80.4	+26.5
LSD	Tsui Kit-sang	530	19.6	N/A
Majority		1,639	60.8	+36.9
Independent hold		Swing		

=== Water Street ===
Water Street
Party	Candidate	Votes	%	±%
Democratic	Wong Kin-shing	1,353	44.3	−13.7
DAB	Yeung Hok-ming	1,241	40.6	N/A
Independent	Lesilie Spencer Tai Cheuk-yin	443	15.2	N/A
Majority		112	3.7	−19.0
Democratic hold		Swing		
