= 1994 Central and Western District Board election =

Hong Kong local election

- 18 September 1994

All 14 seats to Central and Western District Board 8 seats needed for a majority
- Turnout: 31.6%
	First party	Second party	Third party
Party	Democratic	DAB	Liberal
Last election	6 seats, 46.8%	New party	New party
Seats before	6	1	1
Seats won	8	2	1
Seat change	▲2	▲1	Steady
Popular vote	12,852	5,292	2,447
Percentage	46.4%	19.1%	8.8%
Swing	▼0.4%	N/A	N/A
- Colours on map indicate winning party for each constituency.

The 1994 Central and Western District Board election was held on 18 September 1994 to elect all 14 members to the Central and Western District Board, Hong Kong.

== Overall election results ==
Before election:

↓
7	6
Pro-democracy	Pro-Beijing

Change in composition:

↓
9	5
Pro-democracy	Pro-Beijing

Central and Western District Board election result 1994
Party	Seats	Gains	Losses	Net gain/loss	Seats %	Votes %	Votes	+/−
Democratic	8	4	2	+2	57.1	46.4	12,852	–0.4
DAB	2	1	0	+1	14.3	19.1	5,292	
Independent	3	2	1	+1	21.3	17.8	4,937	
Liberal	1	0	0	0	7.1	8.8	2,447	
HKPA	0	0	1	−1	0	3.1	852	
123DA	0	0	0	0	0	2.8	779	
LDF	0	0	1	–1	0	1.9	532	–10.9

== Results by constituency ==
=== Belcher ===
Belcher
Party	Candidate	Votes	%	±%
Democratic	Hung Wing-tat	uncontested		
Democratic win (new seat)				

=== Castle Road ===
Castle Road
Party	Candidate	Votes	%	±%
Democratic	Cheng Lai-king	1,058	66.5	N/A
DAB	So Lai-sin	532	33.5	N/A
Majority		526	30.0	N/A
Democratic win (new seat)				

=== Chung Wan ===
Chung Wan
Party	Candidate	Votes	%	±%
Democratic	Yuen Bun-keung	1,017	64.5	
Independent	Lilianna Au Yim-lung	550	34.9	
Majority		467	29.6	
Democratic hold		Swing		

=== Kennedy Town & Mount Davis ===
Kennedy Town & Mount Davis
Party	Candidate	Votes	%	±%
DAB	Yeung Wai-foon	1,113	50.8	
Democratic	Wong King-hong	1,054	48.1	
Majority		59	2.7	
DAB win (new seat)				

=== Kwun Lung ===
Kwun Lung
Party	Candidate	Votes	%	±%
DAB	Ip Kwok-him	2,011	51.9	
Democratic	Nicky Wong Shui-lai	1,837	47.7	
Majority		174	4.2	
DAB win (new seat)				

=== Middle Levels East ===
Mid Levels East
Party	Candidate	Votes	%	±%
Independent	Kwok Ka-ki	1,018	59.0	
HKPA	Lam Kin-lai	696	40.3	N/A
Majority		322	18.7	
Independent gain from HKPA		Swing		

=== Peak ===
Peak
Party	Candidate	Votes	%	±%
Independent	Louis Leung Wing-on	526	52.8	
Liberal	Chow Kwong-fai	306	30.7	
HKPA	Tang Ping-wing	156	15.6	
Majority		220	22.1	
Independent win (new seat)				

=== Sai Wan ===
Sai Wan
Party	Candidate	Votes	%	±%
Liberal	Chan Tak-chor	1,681	54.2	
Democratic	Chan Kwok-leung	1,406	45.4	
Majority		275	8.8	
Liberal win (new seat)				

=== Sai Ying Pun ===
Sai Ying Pun
Party	Candidate	Votes	%	±%
Democratic	Lai Kwok-hung	1,142	47.7	
Independent	Leung Ying-yeung	641	26.8	
DAB	Chan Yiu-keung	603	25.2	
Majority		501	20.9	
Democratic win (new seat)				

=== Shek Tong Tsui ===
Shek Tong Tsui
Party	Candidate	Votes	%	±%
Democratic	Chan Choi-hi	1,542	77.0	
Liberal	So Lai-yung	460	23.0	
Majority		582	54.0	(new)
Democratic win (new seat)				

=== Sheung Wan ===
Sheung Wan
Party	Candidate	Votes	%	±%
Democratic	Kam Nai-wai	1,486	70.8	+18.1
DAB	Wong Chit-man	612	29.2	N/A
Majority		574	41.6	
Democratic hold		Swing		

=== Tung Wah ===
Tung Wah
Party	Candidate	Votes	%	±%
Democratic	Wong Man-biu	1,314	70.0	N/A
DAB	Kwan Hin-wah	562	30.0	N/A
Majority		752	40.0	
Democratic win (new seat)				

=== University ===
University
Party	Candidate	Votes	%	±%
Independent	Stephen Chan Chit-kwai	1,228	55.3	N/A
Independent	Chu Kin-wah	974	43.8	N/A
Majority		254	11.5	
Independent win (new seat)				

=== Water Street ===
Water Street
Party	Candidate	Votes	%	±%
Democratic	Lee Kam-hang	996	46.0	
123DA	Lesilie Spencer Tai Cheuk-yin	779	36.0	
DAB	Chung Yam-cheung	391	18.1	
Majority		217	10.0	
Democratic win (new seat)				
