= 1999 Central and Western District Council election =

Hong Kong local election

- 28 November 1999

15 (of the 19) seats to Central and Western District Council 10 seats needed for a majority
- Turnout: 30.7%
	First party	Second party
Party	Democratic	DAB
Last election	8 seats, 46.4%	2 seats, 19.1%
Seats before	6	2
Seats won	5	3
Seat change	▼1	▲1
Popular vote	10,744	8,768
Percentage	40.9%	33.4%
Swing	▼5.5%	▲14.3%
	Third party	Fourth party
Party	123DA	Liberal
Last election	0 seat, 2.8%	1 seat, 8.8%
Seats before	0	0
Seats won	1	1
Seat change	▲1	▲1
Popular vote	1,096	774
Percentage	4.2%	2.9%
Swing	▲1.4%	▼5.9%
- Colours on map indicate winning party for each constituency.

The 1999 Central and Western District Council election was held on 28 November 1999 to elect all 15 elected members to the 19-member Central and Western District Council, the first election of the Council since the establishment of the Hong Kong Special Administrative Region.

== Overall election results ==
Before election:

↓
8	6
Pro-democracy	Pro-Beijing

Change in composition:

↓
8	7
Pro-democracy	Pro-Beijing

Central and Western District Council election result 1999
Party	Seats	Gains	Losses	Net gain/loss	Seats %	Votes %	Votes	+/−
Democratic	5	1	2	–1	33.3	40.9	10,744	–5.5
DAB	3	1	0	+1	20.0	33.4	8,768	+14.3
Independent	5	0	1	–1	33.4	15.4	4,043	
123DA	1	1	0	+1	6.7	4.2	1,096	+1.4
HKPA	0	0	0	0	0	3.2	851	+0.1
Liberal	1	1	0	+1	6.7	2.9	774	–5.9

== Results by constituency ==
=== Belcher ===
Belcher
Party	Candidate	Votes	%	±%
DAB	Wong Chit-man	1,262	52.2	N/A
Democratic	Lam Kee-shing	1,157	47.8	N/A
Majority		105	4.4	N/A
DAB gain from Democratic		Swing		

=== Castle Road ===
Castle Road
Party	Candidate	Votes	%	±%
Democratic	Cheng Lai-king	1,014	71.6	+5.1
DAB	So Lai-sin	402	28.4	N/A
Majority		612	43.2	+10.2
Democratic hold		Swing		

=== Centre Street ===
Centre Street
Party	Candidate	Votes	%	±%
Democratic	Henry Leung Yiu-cho	1,063	59.0	N/A
DAB	Tong Wai-yuen	739	41.0	N/A
Majority		324	18.0	(new)
Democratic win (new seat)				

=== Chung Wan ===
Chung Wan
Party	Candidate	Votes	%	±%
Democratic	Yuen Bun-keung	1,179	68.0	+3.5
DAB	Li Man-kuen	546	31.5	N/A
Majority		633	36.5	+6.7
Democratic hold		Swing		

=== Kennedy Town & Mount Davis ===
Kennedy Town & Mount Davis
Party	Candidate	Votes	%	±%
DAB	Yeung Wai-foon	1,217	53.0	+1.6
Democratic	Chan Kwok-leung	1,079	47.0	−1.6
Majority		138	6.0	+3.2
DAB hold		Swing	+1.6	

=== Kwun Lung ===
Kwun Lung
Party	Candidate	Votes	%	±%
DAB	Ip Kwok-him	1,552	57.6	+4.8
Democratic	Rosa Mok Pui-han	1,141	42.4	−4.8
Majority		411	15.2	+10.1
DAB hold		Swing	+5.0	

=== Middle Levels East ===
Mid Levels East
Party	Candidate	Votes	%	±%
Independent	Kwok Ka-ki	1,074	55.8	−3.6
Independent	Marianne Wong Man-yin	851	44.2	N/A
Majority		223	11.6	−7.2
Independent hold		Swing	-1.8	

=== Peak ===
Peak
Party	Candidate	Votes	%	±%
Liberal	James Tien Pei-chun	774	65.3	+34.3
Independent	Louis Leung Wing-on	412	34.7	−18.5
Majority		362	30.6	+8.4
Liberal gain from Independent		Swing	+7.9	

=== Sai Wan ===
Sai Wan
Party	Candidate	Votes	%	±%
Independent	Chan Tak-chor	Unopposed	N/A	N/A
Independent hold		Swing	N/A	

=== Sai Ying Pun ===
Sai Ying Pun
Party	Candidate	Votes	%	±%
Independent	Lai Kwok-hung	1,248	50.1	+2.2
DAB	Chan Yiu-keung	1,243	49.9	+24.6
Majority		5	0.2	−21.0
Independent hold		Swing		

=== Shek Tong Tsui ===
Shek Tong Tsui
Party	Candidate	Votes	%	±%
Independent	Chan Choi-hi	1,309	48.4	
Democratic	Vincent Wong Chak-lai	762	28.2	
DAB	Li Yueh-chin	632	23.4	
Majority		547	20.2	−33.8
Independent hold		Swing		

=== Sheung Wan ===
Sheung Wan
Party	Candidate	Votes	%	±%
Democratic	Kam Nai-wai	1,468	68.1	−2.7
DAB	Yuen Chiu-hing	688	31.9	+2.7
Majority		780	36.2	−5.4
Democratic hold		Swing		

=== Tung Wah ===
Tung Wah
Party	Candidate	Votes	%	±%
Democratic	Frederick Ho Chun-ki	898	64.8	−5.2
DAB	Cheng Chi-keung	546	35.2	+5.2
Majority		352	29.6	−11.4
Democratic hold		Swing		

=== University ===
University
Party	Candidate	Votes	%	±%
Independent	Stephen Chan Chit-kwai	Unopposed	N/A	N/A
Independent hold		Swing		

=== Water Street ===
Water Street
Party	Candidate	Votes	%	±%
123DA	Lesilie Spencer Tai Cheuk-yin	1,096	52.7	+16.7
Democratic	Robin Wan Joe-yiu	983	47.3	+1.3
Majority		113	5.4	
123DA gain from Democratic		Swing		
