= 2007 Central and Western District Council election =

Hong Kong local election

- 18 November 2007

15 (of the 19) seats to Central and Western District Council 10 seats needed for a majority
- Turnout: 36.7%
	First party	Second party
Party	Democratic	DAB
Last election	6 seats, 28.7%	1 seat, 25.2%
Seats before	5	1
Seats won	6	3
Seat change	▲1	▲2
Popular vote	10,021	9,183
Percentage	27.8%	25.5%
Swing	▼0.9%	▲0.3%
	Third party	Fourth party
Party	Civic	Liberal
Last election	New party	2 seats, 1.9%
Seats before	0	2
Seats won	1	1
Seat change	▲1	▼1
Popular vote	795	679
Percentage	2.2%	1.9%
Swing	N/A	▼0.1%
- Colours on map indicate winning party for each constituency.

The 2007 Central and Western District Council election was held on 18 November 2007 to elect all 15 elected members to the 19-member District Council.

== Overall election results ==
Before election:

↓
8	7
Pro-democracy	Pro-Beijing

Change in composition:

↓
7	8
Pro-democracy	Pro-Beijing

Central and Western District Council election result 2007
Party	Seats	Gains	Losses	Net gain/loss	Seats %	Votes %	Votes	+/−
Democratic	6	1	0	+1	40.0	27.8	10,021	–0.9
Independent	4	1	3	–2	26.7	27.2	9,814	
DAB	3	2	0	+2	20.0	25.5	9,183	+0.3
Democratic Coalition	0	0	0	0	0	13.9	5,009	
Civic	1	1	0	+1	6.7	2.2	795	
Liberal	1	0	1	–1	6.7	1.9	679	–0.1
New Forum	0	0	0	0	0	1.5	543	
Frontier	0	0	1	−1	0	0	0	

== Results by constituency ==
=== Belcher ===
Belcher
Party	Candidate	Votes	%	±%
Democratic	Victor Yeung Sui-yin	2,135	52.7	+7.4
DAB	Wong Wang-hong	1,835	45.3	+12.3
Independent	Peter Fong Siu-wah	79	2.0	N/A
Majority		300	7.4	−2.9
Democratic hold		Swing		

=== Castle Road ===
Castle Road
Party	Candidate	Votes	%	±%
Democratic	Cheng Lai-king	1,388	71.9	−1.7
New Forum	Welson Wu Wing-kuen	543	28.1	N/A
Majority		845	43.8	−3.4
Democratic hold		Swing		

=== Centre Street ===
Centre Street
Party	Candidate	Votes	%	±%
Independent	Sidney Lee Chi-hang	2,013	65.0	+15.3
Democratic Coalition	Victor Lee Kwok-chuen	1,085	35.0	N/A
Majority		928	30.0	
Independent hold		Swing		

=== Chung Wan ===
Chung Wan
Party	Candidate	Votes	%	±%
Democratic	Yuen Bun-keung	1,107	61.6	−7.9
DAB	Lee Wai-keung	689	38.9	+7.9
Majority		418	22.7	−7.8
Democratic hold		Swing		

=== Kennedy Town & Mount Davis ===
Kennedy Town & Mount Davis
Party	Candidate	Votes	%	±%
DAB	Chan Hok-fung	1,417	49.0	−1.1
Democratic Coalition	Winfield Chong Wing-fai	1,269	43.9	−6.0
Independent	Kwan Kin-kei	203	7.3	N/A
Majority		148	6.9	+6.7
DAB hold		Swing	+3.4	

=== Kwun Lung ===
Kwun Lung
Party	Candidate	Votes	%	±%
DAB	Ip Kwok-him	2,702	85.0	+35.9
Nonpartisan	Ho Loy	315	9.9	N/A
Independent	Jacky Leong Kim-kam	162	5.1	N/A
Majority		2,387	75.1	+73.3
DAB gain from Frontier		Swing	N/A	

=== Middle Levels East ===
Mid Levels East
Party	Candidate	Votes	%	±%
Independent	Jackie Cheung Yick-hung	1,370	55.5	+13.3
Democratic Coalition	Helena Yuen Chan Suk-yee	1,097	45.5	−13.3
Majority		273	10	−2.8
Independent gain from CWDP		Swing	+12.2	

=== Peak ===
Peak
Party	Candidate	Votes	%	±%
Civic	Tanya Chan	795	47.9	N/A
Liberal	Mark Lin	679	40.9	−13.2
Independent	Louis Leung Wing-on	186	11.2	−34.7
Majority		116	7.0	−1.2
Civic gain from Liberal		Swing	+17.4	

=== Sai Wan ===
Sai Wan
Party	Candidate	Votes	%	±%
Liberal	Chan Tak-chor	Unopposed	N/A	N/A
Liberal hold		Swing	N/A	

=== Sai Ying Pun ===
Sai Ying Pun
Party	Candidate	Votes	%	±%
DAB	Lo Yee-hang	1,850	61.3	+14.6
Independent	Lai Kwok-hung	1,168	38.7	−14.6
Majority		682	24.6	
DAB gain from Independent		Swing		

=== Shek Tong Tsui ===
Shek Tong Tsui
Party	Candidate	Votes	%	±%
Nonpartisan	Chan Choi-hi	1,892	75.2	+15.8
Democratic Coalition	Kelvin Yim Ka-wing	756	28.5	
Majority		1136	46.7	+27.9
Nonpartisan hold		Swing		

=== Sheung Wan ===
Sheung Wan
Party	Candidate	Votes	%	±%
Democratic	Kam Nai-wai	1,783	69.3	−1.4
DAB	Leung Yuen-yee	791	30.7	+1.4
Majority		992	38.6	−2.8
Democratic hold		Swing		

=== Tung Wah ===
Tung Wah
Party	Candidate	Votes	%	±%
Democratic	Frederick Ho Chun-ki	1,033	60.0	−15.1
DAB	Siu Ka-yee	690	40.0	+15.1
Majority		343	20.0	−30.2
Democratic hold		Swing		

=== University ===
University
Party	Candidate	Votes	%	±%
Independent	Stephen Chan Chit-kwai	1,420	54.9	N/A
Democratic Coalition	Lilian Yue Man-tuen	802	31.0	N/A
Independent	Wu Chor-nam	366	14.1	N/A
Majority		618	23.9	N/A
Independent hold		Swing		

=== Water Street ===
Water Street
Party	Candidate	Votes	%	±%
Democratic	Wong Kin-shing	1,407	58.0	N/A
Nonpartisan	Stephen Yam Chi-ming	777	32.1	N/A
Independent	Huang Han	240	9.9	N/A
Majority		418	22.7	N/A
Democratic gain from Independent		Swing		
