= 2019 Central and Western District Council election =

Hong Kong local election

- 24 November 2019

All 15 seats to Central and Western District Council 8 seats needed for a majority
- Turnout: 69.9% ▲23.6%
	First party	Second party	Third party
Party	Democratic	Liberal	DAB
Last election	4 seats, 28.0%	1 seat, 6.6%	5 seats, 23.8%
Seats before	5	1	5
Seats won	7	1	0
Seat change	▲2	Steady	▼5
Popular vote	19,054	4,981	15,507
Percentage	24.7%	6.5%	20.1%
Swing	▼3.3%	▼0.1%	▼3.7%
- Colours on map indicate winning party for each constituency.

The 2019 Central and Western District Council election was held on 24 November 2019 to elect all 15 members of the Central and Western District Council.

Amid the ongoing pro-democracy protests, the pro-democrats scored a historic landslide victory by taking 14 of the 15 seats, with DAB being completely wiped out from the council and its legislator Cheung Kwok-kwan being ousted in Sai Wan.

== Overall election results ==
Before election:

↓
5	10
Pro-democracy	Pro-Beijing

Change in composition:

↓
14	1
Pro-democracy	PB

Central and Western District Council election result 2019
Party	Seats	Gains	Losses	Net gain/loss	Seats %	Votes %	Votes	+/−
Independent	10	6	4	+2	66.7	40.3	31,015	
Democratic	7	2	0	+2	46.7	24.7	19,054	–3.3
DAB	0	0	5	−5	0.0	20.1	15,507	–3.7
Liberal	1	0	0	0	6.7	6.5	4,981	−0.1
PfD	1	1	0	+1	6.7	4.3	3,312	
FTU	0	0	0	0	0	2.5	1,900	
2047 HK Monitor	0	0	0	0	0	1.4	1,106	
VSA	0	0	0	0	0	0.2	138	

== Results by constituency ==
=== A01: Chung Wan ===
Central & Western District Council Election, 2019: Chung Wan
Party	Candidate	Votes	%	±%
Democratic	Hui Chi-fung	1,618	55.09	+1.40
Independent	Wong Chung-wai	1,319	44.91	
Majority		299	10.18	
Turnout		2,947	67.38	
Democratic hold		Swing		

=== A02: Mid Levels East ===
Central & Western District Council Election, 2019: Mid Levels East
Party	Candidate	Votes	%	±%
Democratic	Ng Siu-hong	2,672	57.28	+6.38
DAB	Samuel Mok Kam-sum	1,993	42.72	
Majority		679	14.56	
Turnout		4,685	69.84	
Democratic hold		Swing		

=== A03: Castle Road ===
Central & Western Council Election, 2019: Castle Road
Party	Candidate	Votes	%	±%
Democratic	Cheng Lai-king	2,669	51.05	−1.65
Liberal	Karl Fung Kar-leung	2,559	49.95	+1.65
Majority		110	1.10	
Turnout		5,250	69.45	
Democratic hold		Swing		

=== A04: Peak ===
Central & Western District Council Election, 2019: Peak
Party	Candidate	Votes	%	±%
Liberal	Jeremy Young Chit-on	2,422	68.65	−9.15
2047 HK Monitor	Thomas Uruma Kuninobu	1,106	31.35	
Majority		1,316	37.30	
Turnout		3,536	62.94	
Liberal hold		Swing		

=== A05: University ===
Central & Western District Council Election, 2019: University
Party	Candidate	Votes	%	±%
Nonpartisan	Camille Yam Ka-yi	3,135	51.35	
Independent	Stephen Chan Chit-kwai	2,843	46.57	−9.33
Independent	Au Chung-yin	127	2.08	
Majority		292	4.78	
Turnout		6,115	70.49	
Nonpartisan gain from Independent		Swing		

=== A06: Kwun Lung ===
Central & Western District Council Election, 2019: Kwun Lung
Party	Candidate	Votes	%	±%
Independent	Fergus Leung Fong-wai	3,195	50.69	
DAB	Yeung Hoi-wing	2,970	47.12	−14.28
VSA	Chow Sai-kit	138	2.19	
Majority		225	3.57	
Turnout		6,316	70.29	
Independent gain from DAB		Swing		

=== A07: Kennedy Town & Mount Davis ===
Central & Western District Council Election, 2019: Kennedy Town & Mount Davis
Party	Candidate	Votes	%	±%
PfD	Cherry Wong Kin-ching	3,312	59.45	
DAB	Chan Hok-fung	2,206	39.60	−9.70
Nonpartisan	Mavis Lam Suet-ying	53	0.95	
Majority		1,106	9.85	
Turnout		5,593	73.53	
PfD gain from DAB		Swing		

=== A08: Sai Wan ===
Central & Western District Council Election, 2019: Sai Wan
Party	Candidate	Votes	%	±%
Ind. democrat	Pang Ka-ho	3,289	56.48	
DAB	Cheung Kwok-kwan	2,494	42.83	−8.57
Nonpartisan	Shirley Wong Mi-hing	40	0.69	
Majority		795	13.65	
Turnout		5,845	73.19	
Ind. democrat gain from DAB		Swing		

=== A09: Belcher ===
Central & Western District Council Election, 2019: Belcher
Party	Candidate	Votes	%	±%
Democratic	Victor Yeung Sui-yin	4,002	52.66	
Independent	Yip Wing-shing	3,521	46.34	−4.37
Nonpartisan	Fung King-yin	76	1.00	
Majority		479	6.32	
Turnout		7,617	73.81	
Democratic gain from Independent		Swing		

=== A10: Shek Tong Tsui ===
Central & Western District Council Election, 2019: Shek Tong Tsui
Party	Candidate	Votes	%	±%
Nonpartisan	Sam Yip Kam-lung	3,073	55.27	+13.97
Nonpartisan	Chan Choi-hi	2,487	44.73	−13.97
Majority		586	10.54	
Turnout		5,577	68.12	
Nonpartisan gain from Nonpartisan		Swing		

=== A11: Sai Ying Pun ===
Central & Western District Council Election, 2019: Sai Ying Pun
Party	Candidate	Votes	%	±%
Nonpartisan	Wong Weng-chi	2,734	55.39	
DAB	Timothy Lau Tin-ching	2,202	44.61	−15.19
Majority		532	10.78	
Turnout		4,955	67.85	
Nonpartisan gain from DAB		Swing		

=== A12: Sheung Wan ===
Central & Western District Council Election, 2019: Sheung Wan
Party	Candidate	Votes	%	±%
Democratic	Kam Nai-wai	2,781	59.41	+7.71
FTU	Lui Hung-pan	1,900	40.59	−7.71
Majority		881	18.82	
Turnout		4,700	66.87	
Democratic hold		Swing		

=== A13: Tung Wah ===
Central & Western District Council Election, 2019: Tung Wah
Party	Candidate	Votes	%	±%
Democratic	Bonnie Ng Hoi-yan	2,403	60.84	+8.14
DAB	Cheung Ka-yan	1,547	39.16	
Majority		856	21.68	
Turnout		3,963	69.19	
Democratic hold		Swing		

=== A14: Centre Street ===
Central & Western District Council Election, 2019: Centre Street
Party	Candidate	Votes	%	±%
Democratic	Cheung Kai-yin	2,909	58.90	+9.40
Nonpartisan	Sidney Lee Chi-hang	2,030	41.10	−9.40
Majority		879	17.80	
Turnout		4,954	70.98	
Democratic gain from Nonpartisan		Swing		

=== A15: Water Street ===
Central & Western District Council Election, 2019: Water Street
Party	Candidate	Votes	%	±%
Ind. democrat	Ho Chi-wang	3,093	59.62	
DAB	Yeung Hok-ming	2,095	40.38	−13.12
Majority		998	19.24	
Turnout		5,215	70.40	
Ind. democrat gain from DAB		Swing		
