= 1982 Central and Western District Board election =

Hong Kong local election

- 23 September 1982

5 (of the 17) seats to Central and Western District Board 9 seats needed for a majority
- Turnout: 33.0%
	First party
Party	Civic
Seats won	1
Popular vote	2,135
Percentage	11.0%

The 1982 Central and Western District Board election was the first election held on 23 September 1982 to elect all 5 elected to the 17-member Central and Western District Board.

== Overall election results ==
Central and Western District Board election result 1982
Party	Seats	Gains	Losses	Net gain/loss	Seats %	Votes %	Votes	+/−
Independent	4	4	0	+4	80.0	72.2	11,838	
Civic	1	1	0	+1	20.0	13.0	2,135	
Observers	0	0	0	0	0	7.4	1,216	
Reform	0	0	0	0	0	7.4	1,213	

== Results by constituency ==
=== Chung Wan ===
Chung Wan
Party	Candidate	Votes	%	±%
Nonpartisan	Chow Wai-keung	1,022	54.5	
Nonpartisan	Chan Kin-pun	499	26.6	
Civic	Chow Ping-wing	355	18.9	
Nonpartisan win (new seat)				

=== Kennedy Town & Mount Davis ===
Kennedy Town & Mount Davis
Party	Candidate	Votes	%	±%
Nonpartisan	Chow Yin-sum	3,431	64.6	
Nonpartisan	Yeung Yui-kwan	1,877	35.4	
Majority		1,554	29.0	
Nonpartisan win (new seat)				

=== Middle Levels & Peak ===
Mid Levels & Peak
Party	Candidate	Votes	%	±%
Nonpartisan	Tong Ka-wing	1,413	63.6	
Nonpartisan	Tsui Chun-hing	809	36.4	
Nonpartisan win (new seat)				

=== Sai Ying Pun ===
Sai Ying Pun
Party	Candidate	Votes	%	±%
Civic	Lee Tat-yu	1,780	41.2	
Nonpartisan	Tang Yee-lin	1,332	30.8	
Reform	Leung Ying-yeung	1,213	28.0	
Majority		448	10.4	
Civic win (new seat)				

=== Sheung Wan ===
Sheung Wan
Party	Candidate	Votes	%	±%
Nonpartisan	Shiu Man-ying	1,455	54.5	
Observers	Anthony Ng Shun-man	1,216	45.5	
Majority		239	9.0	
Nonpartisan win (new seat)				

== See also ==
- 1982 Hong Kong local elections
