= 1991 Central and Western District Board election =

Hong Kong local election

- 3 March 1991

13 (of the 19) seats to Central and Western District Board 10 seats needed for a majority
- Turnout: 27.9%
	First party	Second party	Third party
Party	United Democrats	LDF	FTU
Last election	New party	New party	Did not run
Seats before	7	1	0
Seats won	5	2	1
Seat change	▼2	▲1	▲1
Popular vote	9,793	2,688	2,942
Percentage	46.8%	12.8%	14.1%
Swing	N/A	N/A	N/A
	Fourth party	Fifth party
Party	Civic	Meeting Point
Last election	1 seat, 7.5%	1 seat, 7.5%
Seats before	0	1
Seats won	1	1
Seat change	▲1	Steady
Popular vote	1,076	Uncontested
Percentage	5.1%	N/A
Swing	▼2.4%	N/A

The 1991 Central and Western District Board election was held on 3 March 1991 to elect all 13 elected to the 19-member Central and Western District Board.

== Overall election results ==
Before election:

↓
10	3
Liberals	Con.

Change in composition:

↓
7	1	5
Liberals	PB	Conservatives

Central and Western District Board election result 1991
Party	Seats	Gains	Losses	Net gain/loss	Seats %	Votes %	Votes	+/−
United Democrats	5	1	3	–2	38.5	46.8	9,793	
Independent	3	0	1	–1	23.1	21.2	4,433	
LDF	2	1	0	+1	15.4	12.8	2,688	
FTU	1	1	0	+1	7.7	14.1	2,942	
Civic	1	1	0	+1	7.1	5.1	1,076	–2.4
Meeting Point	1	0	0	0	7.7	0	0	

== Results by constituency ==
=== Chung Wan ===
Chung Wan
Party	Candidate	Votes	%	±%
LDF (Civic)	Vivian Chih Wan-wan	1,438	66.9	
United Democrats	Yuen Bun-keung	1,008	46.9	
United Democrats	Cheng Lai-king	9,55	44.4	
LDF gain from United Democrats		Swing		
United Democrats hold		Swing		

=== Kennedy Town East ===
Kennedy Town East
Party	Candidate	Votes	%	±%
Meeting Point (United Democrats)	Hung Wing-tat	uncontested		
Meeting Point hold		Swing		

=== Kennedy Town West and Mount Davis ===
Kennedy Town West and Mount Davis
Party	Candidate	Votes	%	±%
Nonpartisan	Chan Tak-chor	3,409	37.2	
FTU	Ip Kwok-him	2,942	32.1	
United Democrats	Wong Sui-lai	2,804	30.6	
Nonpartisan hold		Swing		
FTU gain from United Democrats		Swing		

=== Middle Levels East ===
Mid Levels East
Party	Candidate	Votes	%	±%
Nonpartisan	Lam Kin-lai	1,024	60.3	N/A
United Democrats	Chow Wai-keung	913	53.7	N/A
United Democrats	Gerry Wai Ka-cheung	857	50.4	N/A
Nonpartisan win (new seat)				
United Democrats win (new seat)				

=== Middle Levels West ===
Mid Levels West
Party	Candidate	Votes	%	±%
Civic	Stephen Chan Chit-kwai	1,076	60.3	
United Democrats	Andrew Wang Wei-hung	585	53.7	
Majority		491	6.6	
Civic win (new seat)				

=== Sai Ying Pun East ===
Sai Ying Pun East
Party	Candidate	Votes	%	±%
Nonpartisan	Leung Ying-yeung	uncontested		
Nonpartisan hold		Swing		

=== Sai Ying Pun West ===
Sai Ying Pun West
Party	Candidate	Votes	%	±%
Meeting Point	Chan Choi-hi	uncontested		
Meeting Point hold		Swing		

=== Sheung Wan ===
Sheung Wan
Party	Candidate	Votes	%	±%
United Democrats	Anthony Ng Shun-man	1,431	60.8	−1.0
LDF	Alexander Chang Yau-hung	1,250	53.1	+10.5
United Democrats	Kam Nai-wai	1,240	52.7	
United Democrats hold		Swing		
LDF hold		Swing		
