= 1985 Central and Western District Board election =

Hong Kong local election

- 7 March 1985

13 (of the 19) seats to Central and Western District Board 10 seats needed for a majority
- Turnout: 30.2%
| | First party | Second party |
|---|---|---|
| Party | Central and Western District Coalition | Reform |
| Last election | New party | 0 seat, 7.4% |
| Seats before | 3 | 0 |
| Seats won | 10 | 1 |
| Seat change | ▲7 | ▲1 |
| Popular vote | 19,703 | 1,975 |
| Percentage | 77.5% | 7.8% |
| Swing | N/A | ▲0.8% |

The 1985 Central and Western District Board election was held on 7 March 1985 to elect all 13 elected to the 19-member Central and Western District Board. The 5 incumbents formed a coalition with 7 other candidates and swept the polls with winning 10 out of the 12 seats.

== Overall election results ==
Central and Western District Board election result 1985
| Party | Seats | Gains | Losses | Net gain/loss | Seats % | Votes % | Votes | +/− |
|---|---|---|---|---|---|---|---|---|
| Central and Western District Coalition | 10 | 7 | 0 | +7 | 76.9 | 77.5 | 19,703 | |
| Independent | 2 | 1 | 1 | 0 | 15.4 | 49.1 | 12,481 | |
| Reform | 1 | 1 | 0 | +1 | 7.7 | 7.8 | 1,975 | +0.8 |

== Results by constituency ==
=== Chung Wan ===
Chung Wan
| Party | Candidate | Votes | % | ±% |
|---|---|---|---|---|
| People's Association | Chow Wai-keung | uncontested | | |
| HKAS | Gerry Wai Ka-cheung | uncontested | | |
| Nonpartisan hold | | Swing | | |
| HKAS win (new seat) | | | | |

=== Kennedy Town East ===
Kennedy Town East
| Party | Candidate | Votes | % | ±% |
|---|---|---|---|---|
| Meeting Point | Hung Wing-tat | 1,977 | 44.3 | |
| HKAS | Lee Shun-wai | 1,334 | 29.9 | |
| Nonpartisan | Pang Wah-keung | 817 | 18.3 | |
| Reform | Shek Yiu-wah | 339 | 7.6 | |
| Meeting Point win (new seat) | | | | |
| HKAS win (new seat) | | | | |

=== Kennedy Town West and Mount Davis ===
Kennedy Town West and Mount Davis
| Party | Candidate | Votes | % | ±% |
|---|---|---|---|---|
| People's Association | Vincent Ko Hon-chiu | 4,194 | 58.7 | |
| Nonpartisan | Chow Yin-sum | 2,433 | 48.1 | |
| Nonpartisan | Ho Chi-hung | 512 | 7.2 | |
| People's Association win (new seat) | | | | |
| Nonpartisan win (new seat) | | | | |

=== Middle Levels and Peak ===
Mid Levels and Peak
| Party | Candidate | Votes | % | ±% |
|---|---|---|---|---|
| Nonpartisan | Chan Wai-fong | 2,253 | 40.5 | |
| Nonpartisan | Tong Ka-wing | 2,073 | 37.2 | –26.4 |
| Nonpartisan | Yuen Bun-keung | 1,242 | 22.3 | |
| Nonpartisan win (new seat) | | | | |
| Nonpartisan hold | | Swing | | |

=== Sai Ying Pun East ===
Sai Ying Pun East
| Party | Candidate | Votes | % | ±% |
|---|---|---|---|---|
| People's Association | Lai Kwok-hung | 1,953 | 43.7 | |
| Reform | Leung Ying-yeung | 1,636 | 36.6 | |
| Nonpartisan | Cheung Yiu-kei | 878 | 19.7 | |
| People's Association win (new seat) | | | | |
| Reform win (new seat) | | | | |

=== Sai Ying Pun West ===
Sai Ying Pun West
| Party | Candidate | Votes | % | ±% |
|---|---|---|---|---|
| Nonpartisan | Lee Tat-yu | uncontested | | |
| Nonpartisan win (new seat) | | | | |

=== Sheung Wan ===
Sheung Wan
| Party | Candidate | Votes | % | ±% |
|---|---|---|---|---|
| Observers | Anthony Ng Shun-man | 1,522 | 65.6 | +20.1 |
| Nonpartisan | Alexander Chang Yau-hung | 1,187 | 51.2 | |
| Nonpartisan | Tsui Mei-lam | 1,086 | 46.8 | |
| Observers gain from Nonpartisan | | Swing | | |
| Nonpartisan win (new seat) | | | | |
