= 1988 Central and Western District Board election =

Hong Kong local election

- 10 March 1988

13 (of the 20) seats to Central and Western District Board 11 seats needed for a majority
- Turnout: 23.4%
	First party	Second party	Third party
Party	HKAS	Meeting Point	Reform
Last election	2 seats, 5.2%	1 seat, 7.8%	1 seat, 7.8%
Seats before	4	1	1
Seats won	5	2	1
Seat change	▲1	▲1	Steady
Popular vote	7,331	2,148	1,488
Percentage	36.3%	10.6%	7.4%
Swing	▲31.1%	▲2.8%	▼0.4%
	Fourth party	Fifth party
Party	PHKS	ADPL
Last election	Did not run	New party
Seats before	1	1
Seats won	1	1
Seat change	Steady	Steady
Popular vote	1,391	1,046
Percentage	6.9%	5.2%
Swing	N/A	N/A

The 1988 Central and Western District Board election was held on 10 March 1988 to elect all 13 elected to the 20-member Central and Western District Board.

== Overall election results ==
Before election:

↓
8	1	4
Liberals	O.	Con.

Change in composition:

↓
9	1	3
Liberals	O.	Con.

Central and Western District Board election result 1988
Party	Seats	Gains	Losses	Net gain/loss	Seats %	Votes %	Votes	+/−
Independent	3	1	3	–2	23.1	49.1	12,481	
HKAS	5	1	0	+1	38.5	36.3	7,331	+31.1
Meeting Point	2	1	0	+1	15.4	10.6	2,148	+2.8
Reform	1	0	0	0	7.7	7.4	1,488	
PHKS	1	0	0	0	7.7	6.9	1,391	
ADPL	1	0	0	0	7.7	5.2	1,046	
Civic	0	0	0	0	0	3.0	597	

== Results by constituency ==
=== Chung Wan ===
Chung Wan
Party	Candidate	Votes	%	±%
ADPL	Yuen Bun-keung	1,046	69.3	
HKAS	Gerry Wai Ka-cheung	1,002	66.4	
PHKS	Tse Wong Siu-yin	475	31.5	
ADPL hold		Swing		
HKAS hold		Swing		

=== Kennedy Town East ===
Kennedy Town East
Party	Candidate	Votes	%	±%
Meeting Point	Hung Wing-tat	1,283	41.7	–2.6
HKAS	Lee Shun-wai	1,254	40.7	+10.8
Nonpartisan	Tse Fook-lam	541	17.6	
Meeting Point hold		Swing		
HKAS hold		Swing		

=== Kennedy Town West and Mount Davis ===
Kennedy Town West and Mount Davis
Party	Candidate	Votes	%	±%
Nonpartisan	Chan Tak-chor	2,324	36.0	
HKAS	Wong Sui-lai	2,315	35.9	
Nonpartisan	Chow Yin-sum	1,814	28.1	–20.0
Nonpartisan gain from People's Association		Swing		
HKAS gain from Nonpartisan		Swing		

=== Middle Levels and Peak ===
Mid Levels and Peak
Party	Candidate	Votes	%	±%
Nonpartisan	Chan Wai-fong	uncontested		
Nonpartisan	Lam Kin-lai	uncontested		
Nonpartisan hold		Swing		
Nonpartisan gain from Nonpartisan		Swing		

=== Sai Ying Pun East ===
Sai Ying Pun East
Party	Candidate	Votes	%	±%
Reform	Leung Ying-yeung	1,488	41.7	+5.1
HKAS	Lai Kwok-hung	1,431	40.1	–3.6
Nonpartisan	Po Fung-ping	651	18.2	
Reform hold		Swing		
HKAS hold		Swing		

=== Sai Ying Pun West ===
Sai Ying Pun West
Party	Candidate	Votes	%	±%
Meeting Point	Chan Choi-hi	865	59.6	
Civic	Cheung Wing-foo	597	40.4	
Meeting Point gain from Nonpartisan		Swing		

=== Sheung Wan ===
Sheung Wan
Party	Candidate	Votes	%	±%
HKAS	Anthony Ng Shun-man	1,329	61.8	–3.8
PHKS	Alexander Chang Yau-hung	916	42.6	–8.6
Nonpartisan	Chan Hok-man	850	39.5	
HKAS hold		Swing		
PHKS hold		Swing		
