= Anna Wu =

Anna Wu Hung-yuk
- 胡紅玉
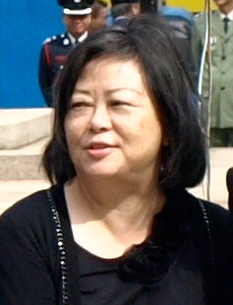
- Anna Wu (2010)

Convenor
- In office 21 January 2009 – 30 June 2017
- Chief Executive: Leung Chun-ying
- Preceded by: Lam Woon-kwong

Chairperson of the Competition Commission of Hong Kong
- Incumbent
- Assumed office 17 March 2009
- Preceded by: Henry Fan

Personal details
- Born: 25 January 1951 (age 74)

Anna Wu Hung-yuk (Traditional Chinese: 胡紅玉; born 1951, Hong Kong) is a former non-official member of the Executive Council of Hong Kong. She qualified as a solicitor after graduating from the Faculty of Law of the University of Hong Kong. She is currently a management consultant.

Formerly, she served as Chairperson of the Mandatory Provident Fund Schemes Authority and Council Member of the Hong Kong International Arbitration Centre.

On 26 April 2013, she was appointed Chairperson of the Competition Commission, a position she continues to hold today.

Politically, she is considered on good terms with the pan-democratic camp. She has urged democratic parties to "roll up their sleeves" and set up a shadow cabinet that offers alternative policy programmes, in preparation for a time when they might hold political office.

== Public service ==
In 1975, Wu was a founding member of the Hong Kong Observers, a group of liberal-minded intellectuals and professionals.

From 1993 to 1995 she was a member of the Legislative Council, but left disappointed having failed to put through three equal opportunities bills, citing government and bureaucratic intransigence towards greater public accountability.

She was Chairman of the Equal Opportunities Commission, set up in 1996.

From October 1997 to July 1999, she was chairperson of the Hong Kong Consumer Council (HKCC). She became a member of HKCC in 1989 and was its vice-chairman from 1993. At that time, she headed its Legal Protection Committee (1992–97) and Consumer Legal Action Fund Management Committee. She was also vice-chairman of the Competition Policy Committee. Later, as chairperson, Wu was instrumental in the establishment of the Consumer Legal Action Fund (CLAF) in 1994. She then chaired the Management Committee of CLAF from December 1994 to January 1998, and chaired the Board of Administrators from January 1998.

Wu was chairman of the Operations Review Committee of the Independent Commission Against Corruption.

In January 2009, Wu joined the Executive Council (Exco) under Chief Executive Donald Tsang. When CY Leung became Chief Executive on 1 July 2012, Wu was one of only four members retained in the new Exco. Shortly afterwards she took the chair of the new Committee on the Implementation of Moral & National Education, set up to allay public concern over the government's controversial Moral & National Education Curriculum, which encourages loyalty to the 'motherland', China, and which is widely seen as tilted towards the Communist Party's version of history and loyalty. Wu resigned from the Executive Council in 2017.

Wu has also been a member of the Law Reform Commission and the Hospital Authority. She was a director of the Hong Kong Mortgage Corporation and a non-executive director of the Securities and Futures Commission.

Political offices
Preceded by Edward Chen	Chairman of Hong Kong Consumer Council; 1997–1999	Succeeded by Andrew Chan
