= Stephen Chan Chit-kwai =

Stephen Chan Chit-kwai, BBS, JP (Chinese: 陳捷貴; born 1949) is a former Hong Kong politician who was a member of the Central and Western District Council for the University constituency from 1991 to 2019, running unopposed in 1999 and 2003. He lost his seat in the 2019 District Council elections. He joined the University of Hong Kong in 1977, and is now manager of the Lady Ho Tung Hall Dormitories of the Li ka-shing Faculty of Medicine. He received the HKU 35-year long-term service award in 2013.

Political offices
New constituency	Member of the Central and Western District Council; Representative for University; 1994–2019	Succeeded by Yam Ka-yi
New title	Chairman of the Provisional Central and Western District Board; 1997–2000	Council abolished
Preceded by Wu Chor-nam	Vice-Chairman of the Central and Western District Council; 2008–2011	Succeeded by Chan Hok-fung
