= Lo King-man =

Hong Kong performing artist and director

Lo King-man (Chinese: 盧景文; born 1937) is a Hong Kong performing artist and director. He is known as the "Father of Hong Kong Opera". He is also the former vice-chairman of the Urban Council from 1990 to 1995, as well as member of the various public advisory boards including the member of the Hong Kong Basic Law Consultative Committee from 1985 to 1990.

== Early life and education ==
Lo was born in Hong Kong and was educated at the Diocesan Boys' School. He graduated from the University of Hong Kong (HKU) with a Bachelor of Arts degree in English. During his studies, he received a scholarship from the Italian government to study theatre history and literature at the Sapienza University of Rome. During his stay in Italy, he interned in stage production design at the Teatro dell'Opera di Roma and the Teatro Morlacchi.

== Career ==
After returning to Hong Kong, he began his career in stage production design, working with the University of Hong Kong and several British theatre companies in the city, including the Garrison Players, Hong Kong Singers, and Hong Kong Stage Club. He recalled the Chinese theatre in Hong Kong had not become active until the return of Chung King-fai from his studies in mid-1960s, which led him to work mainly with British theatre companies. He later became senior assistant registrar at HKU.

In 1972, he directed Lady White (白孃孃), the first Hong Kong Mandarin-language musical, initiated and produced by Rebecca Pan, with music by Joseph Koo and lyrics by James Wong, alongside Li Baoxuan, Zhuang Nu, Wang Xiaosong, and Lo King-man. The costumes was designed by David Tang Shee-kwan. The musical was adopted from Legend of the White Snake, a Chinese folk legend, and was produced 60 times at Princess Theatre (樂宮戲院) in 1972.

In 1973, Lo joined the newly established Hong Kong Polytechnic as the academic secretary and later deputy director. In 1993, he was appointed director of the Hong Kong Academy for Performing Arts until he retired in 2004. From 2004 to 2009, he was appointed principal of the Canton International Summer Music Academy by the Guangdong government.

He was first appointed to the Committee of Inquiry into the Precious Blood Golden Jubilee Secondary School in 1978, headed by Dr. Rayson Huang, during the Golden Jubilee Secondary School scandal. In 1984, he was appointed a member of the Urban Council and was the vice-chairman of the Urban Council from 1990 to 1995. He formed the Hong Kong People's Association with Ronald Leung, Wong Siu-lun, Margaret Ng and Elsie Leung, one of the earliest pressure groups in the transition period in 1984. He was also a member of the Hong Kong Basic Law Consultative Committee from 1985 to 1990. He was also member of the Kowloon City District Board, councils of the four universities including the University of Hong Kong, Hong Kong Examinations Authority, Hong Kong Broadcasting Authority, Vocational Training Council, Advisory Committee on Community Relations of the Independent Commission Against Corruption, Standing Commission on Civil Service Salaries and Conditions of Service, Hong Kong Arts Development Council and other advisory boards. Lo was also one of the founders of the Hong Kong Arts Centre. He was also involved in the Hong Kong Philharmonic Orchestra and Hong Kong Sinfonietta. He was also a member of the Hong Kong Cultural Centre.

Lo wrote, directed and produced more than 180 Western operas, theatre and musicals. He was a member of the international advisory committee of the Beijing Music Festival and the guest professor of the Central Conservatory of Music. He was awarded with the "Best Stage Design" by the Hong Kong Federation of Drama Societies, the "Best Stage Director" by the Hong Kong Artists' Guild, "Lifetime Achievement Award" by the International Society for the Performing Arts and "Award for Outstanding Contribution in Arts" by the Hong Kong Arts Development Council.

== Awards and recognition ==
He was awarded Justice of the Peace, Order of the British Empire by the United Kingdom, Order of Merit of the Italian Republic by the Italian Republic and Ordre des Arts et des Lettres by the French Minister of Culture. He also received honorary fellowships from the University of Hong Kong, the Hong Kong Polytechnic University and the Hong Kong Academy for Performing Arts and the Royal Academy of Arts. He received the Bronze Bauhinia Star (BBS) and the Silver Bauhinia Star (SBS) from the Hong Kong SAR government in 2005 and 2012.

During the 15th Hong Kong Arts Development Awards was held on Oct 30, 2021, organised by the Hong Kong Arts Development Council (HKADC), Lo was the recipient of The Life Achievement Award, having dedicated himself to the arts sector for more than half a century, participating in countless stage performances in various roles including actor, playwright, producer, director and stage designer. Lo was also a pioneer in the local arts and cultural scene and was the first Chinese to produce opera in Hong Kong.
