= University (constituency) =

Former Hong Kong constituency

- Former Elected constituency for the Central & Western District Council
- Boundary of University in Central & Western District
- District: Central & Western
- Legislative Council constituency: Hong Kong Island West
- Population: 18,029 (2019)
- Electorate: 8,675 (2019)

Former constituency
- Created: 1994
- Abolished: 2023
- Number of members: One

University (Chinese: 大學), formerly called Mid Levels West before 1994, was one of the 15 constituencies in the Central & Western District of Hong Kong.

It returned one member of the district council until it was abolished the 2023 electoral reforms.

The constituency was loosely based on the area around its namesake University of Hong Kong's Main Campus in Mid-Levels, with an estimated population of 18,029.

== Boundaries ==
University constituency was roughly based on the western portion of the Mid-levels, bounded on the north by Bonham Road and on the west by Pok Fu Lam Road, except for a small section of the latter outside HKU's Jockey Club Student Village.

The constituency covered the whole of the University of Hong Kong's Main Campus as well as the student accommodations of St. John's College and Jockey Club Student Village.

Bordering University are the constituencies of Kwun Lung, Belcher, Water Street, Centre Street, Tung Wah, Castle Road and Peak, as well as the Pokfulam constituency of Southern District.

== Councillors represented ==
Election	Member	Party	%
1994	Stephen Chan Chit-kwai	Independent	55.77
1999	Stephen Chan Chit-kwai	Independent	N/A
2003	Stephen Chan Chit-kwai	Independent	N/A
2007	Stephen Chan Chit-kwai	Independent	54.87
2011	Stephen Chan Chit-kwai	Independent	80.36
2015	Stephen Chan Chit-kwai	Independent	55.90
2019	Camille Yam Ka-yi→Vacant (Note: Resigned on 11 July 2021 over new oath-taking law.)	Independent	51.35

== Election results ==
=== 2010s ===
Central & Western District Council Election, 2019: University
Party	Candidate	Votes	%	±%
Nonpartisan	Camille Yam Ka-yi	3,135	51.35	
Independent	Stephen Chan Chit-kwai	2,843	46.57	−9.33
Independent	Au Chung-yin	127	2.08	
Majority		292	4.78	
Turnout		6,115	70.49	
Nonpartisan gain from Independent		Swing		

Central & Western District Council Election, 2015: University
Party	Candidate	Votes	%	±%
Independent	Stephen Chan Chit-kwai	1,844	55.9	–24.5
Independent	Edward Lau Wai-tak	1,455	44.1	
Majority		389	11.8	–49.0
Turnout		3,334	41.1	
Independent hold		Swing		

Central & Western District Council Election, 2011: University
Party	Candidate	Votes	%	±%
Independent	Stephen Chan Chit-kwai	2,169	80.4	+26.5
LSD	Tsui Kit-sang	530	19.6	N/A
Majority		1,639	60.8	+36.9
Independent hold		Swing		

=== 2000s ===
Central & Western District Council Election, 2007: University
Party	Candidate	Votes	%	±%
Independent	Stephen Chan Chit-kwai	1,420	54.9	N/A
Democratic Coalition	Lilian Yue Man-tuen	802	31.0	N/A
Independent	Wu Chor-nam	366	14.1	N/A
Majority		618	23.9	N/A
Independent hold		Swing		

Central & Western District Council Election, 2003: University
Party	Candidate	Votes	%	±%
Independent	Stephen Chan Chit-kwai	Unopposed	N/A	N/A
Independent hold		Swing		

=== 1990s ===
Central & Western District Council Election, 1999: University
Party	Candidate	Votes	%	±%
Independent	Stephen Chan Chit-kwai	Unopposed	N/A	N/A
Independent hold		Swing		

Central & Western District Board Election, 1994: University
Party	Candidate	Votes	%	±%
Independent	Stephen Chan Chit-kwai	1,228	55.3	N/A
Independent	Chu Kin-wah	974	43.8	N/A
Majority		254	11.5	
HKPA win (new seat)				
