= Chow Wai-keung =

Hong Kong social worker and politician

Chow Wai-keung (Chinese: 周偉強; born ca. 1957) is a Hong Kong social worker and politician. He was an elected member of the Central and Western District Board and the Urban Council of Hong Kong in the 1980s and 1990s.

Chow was born in Hong Kong in around 1957. He grew up in Central. He was graduated from the Baptist College and was a core member of the Hong Kong Social Workers' General Union. He was first elected to the Central and Western District Board in Central in the first District Board elections in 1982. He was among the first politicians to demand for increased democracy in the 1980s and welcomed the government's Green Paper: the Further Development of Representative Government in Hong Kong.

Chow was re-elected in 1985 but resigned after he was elected to the Urban Council of Hong Kong in 1986. In the capacity of the Urban Council for Central and Western District he returned to the Central and Western District Board as ex officio member. He was re-elected to the Urban Council uncontestedly in 1989. In 1991, he represented the United Democrats of Hong Kong to run in the 1991 District Board elections. He retired from politics when he stepped down from the District Board in 1994.

Political offices
New creation	Member of the Central and Western District Board; Representative for Central; 1982–1986	Succeeded by Yuen Bun-keung
New constituency	Member of the Central and Western District Board; Representative for Mid Levels East; 1991-1994	Succeeded by Kwok Ka-ki
Preceded by Maria Tam	Member of the Urban Council; Representative for Central and Western; 1986–1991	Succeeded by Wong Sui-lai
