= Hong Kong Observers =

Hong Kong Observers 香港觀察社
- Founded: 7 July 1975
- Dissolved: 5 March 2002
- Ideology: Liberalism (Hong Kong)

The Hong Kong Observers (Chinese: 香港觀察社) was a middle class-based pressure group in Hong Kong that was active during the 1970s and 80s. It was formed by a group of young overseas-educated Chinese professionals and second-generation British expatriates who came together on 7 July 1975 to discuss issues affecting Hong Kong. It hoped to "supervise and criticise the government through objective research, exerting pressure on the government by influencing public opinion."

Through frequent and often influential articles published in both Chinese and English newspapers in the 1970s, the group called for government action to address community needs and greater public participation in local politics.

On 12 December 1980, an article written by Duncan Campbell in the New Statesman revealed that a secret committee called the Standing Committee on Pressure Groups (SCOPG) was set up by the Hong Kong government to infiltrate pressure groups in the colony and monitor their activities. The Hong Kong Observers bore the brunt of these pressure tactics, which forced the group to cease its activities in 1983.

The group's main concern in the 1980s was the Sino-British negotiations over the sovereignty of Hong Kong. It called for Hong Kong people to express their views and conducted an opinion poll on the colony's future. In 1983, prior to negotiations between Beijing and London over Hong Kong's future, Anna Wu led a delegation of lawyers to Beijing to meet with the then Director of the Hong Kong and Macau Affairs Office. They argued that human rights, rule of law and constitutional reform should be reflected in the Sino-British agreement. The group also argued for a longer transitional period, some degree of British presence after 1997 and the participation of Hong Kong people in drafting the future Hong Kong Basic Law.

Notable members of the group included former Chief Executive Leung Chun-ying and political scientist Joseph Cheng, who served as chairman from 1980 to 1982. Another former chair, Christine Loh, and Anna Wu were both appointed members of the Legislative Council by Governor Chris Patten shortly after he assumed office. Wu later became a non-official member in the Executive Council and Loh was appointed as undersecretary for Environment Bureau by Leung Chun-ying in 2012.
