= Hong Kong People's Association =

Hong Kong People's Association 港人協會
- Chairman: Lo King-man
- General Secretary: Luk Yan-lung
- Vice-Chairmen: Leung Ping-chung; Ko Hong-chiu; Jack So Chak-kwong
- Founded: 18 November 1984

The Hong Kong People's Association (Chinese: 港人協會) was a middle-class and professional oriented political organisation formed on 18 November 1984. Along with the Association for Democracy and Justice, it was established in response to the signing of the Sino-British Joint Declaration and British Foreign Secretary Geoffrey Howe's visit in April 1984.

It was one of the many political groups formed during the Sino-British negotiations on the sovereignty of Hong Kong in the early 80s and demanded democratic reform during the transition period, the others being notably the Meeting Point and Hong Kong Affairs Society. It participated in the district board elections in 1985.

The Association aimed at upholding the high autonomy status under the framework of "one country, two systems" as laid by the Sino-British Joint Declaration.

During the discussion on the drafting of the Hong Kong Basic Law and the electoral reform for the 1988 Legislative Council election, it took a relatively moderate stance, supporting the "Consensus model" of the future structure of the SAR and a slower and stabler pace of democratisation.

Notable members included Michael Luk Yan-lung, Lee Ming-kwan, Wong Siu-lun, Margaret Ng Ngoi-yee, Jack So Chak-kwong, Lo King-man and Ronald Leung Ding-bong.

== See also ==
- List of political parties in Hong Kong
