= Chan Hok-fung =

Hong Kong politician

The Honourable Chan Hok-fung MH JP
- 陳學鋒
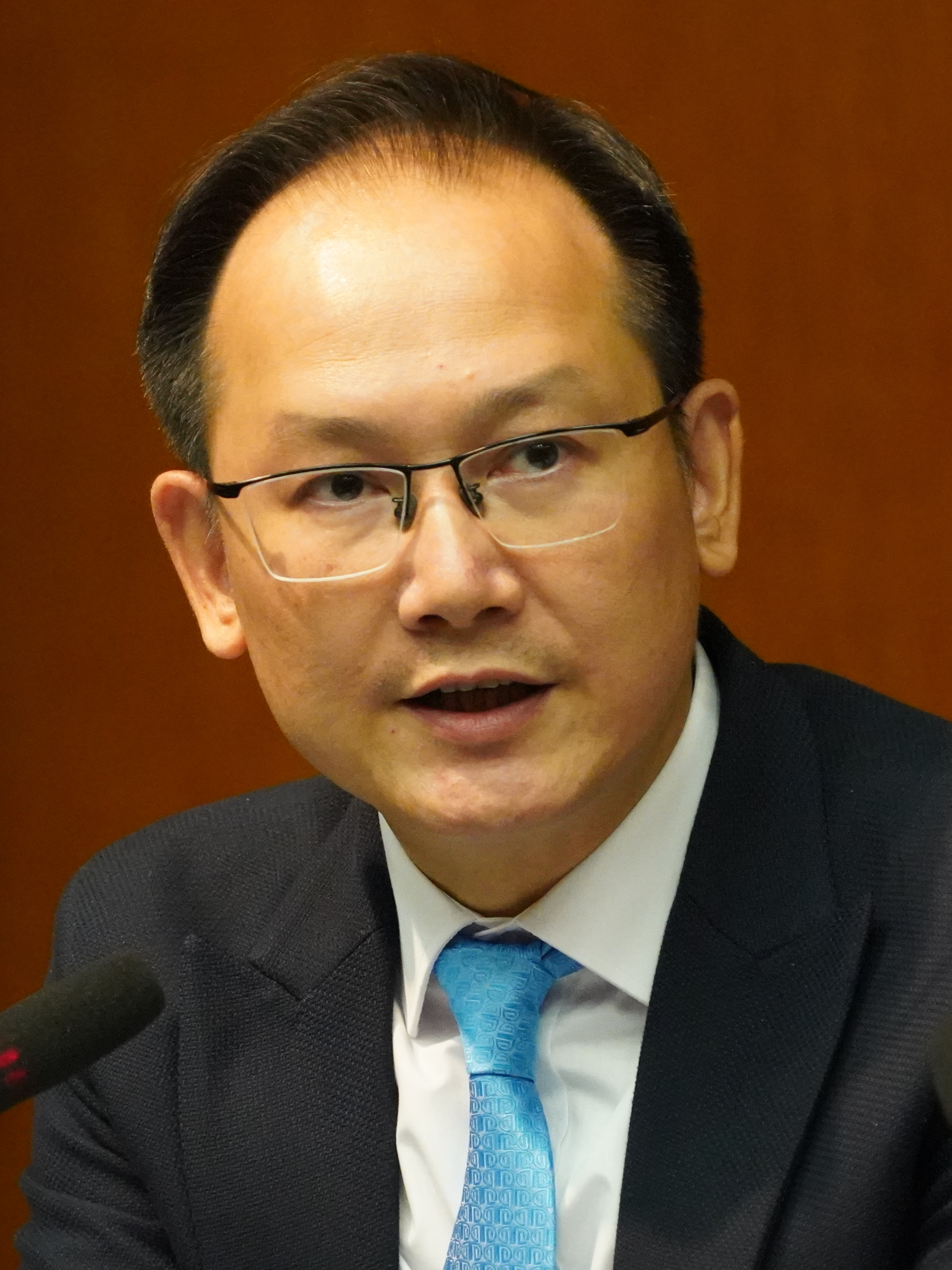
- Chan in 2025

Member of the Legislative Council
- Incumbent
- Assumed office 1 January 2022
- Preceded by: Constituency created
- Constituency: Hong Kong Island West

Vice-chairperson of the Central and Western District Council
- In office 5 January 2012 – 31 December 2019
- Preceded by: Stephen Chan
- Succeeded by: Victor Yeung

Member of the Central and Western District Council
- In office 1 January 2008 – 31 December 2019
- Preceded by: Raymond Yeung
- Succeeded by: Cherry Wong
- Constituency: Kennedy Town & Mount Davis

Personal details
- Born: 1976 (age 49–50)
- Party: DAB
- Education: Hon Wah College

Chan Hok-fung
- Traditional Chinese: 陳學鋒
- Simplified Chinese: 陈学锋
Transcriptions
Standard Mandarin
- Hanyu Pinyin: Chén Xuéfēng
Yue: Cantonese
- Jyutping: can4 hok6 fung1

Chan Hok-Fung is a pro-Beijing DAB Hong Kong politician who was a member of Central and Western District Council, and was once the vice-chairman of the council, until losing re-election in the 2019 Hong Kong local elections. He was elected in 2021 Legislative Council Election through Hong Kong Island West constituency. In December 2025, he was re-elected through the same constituency.

== Election campaign experience ==
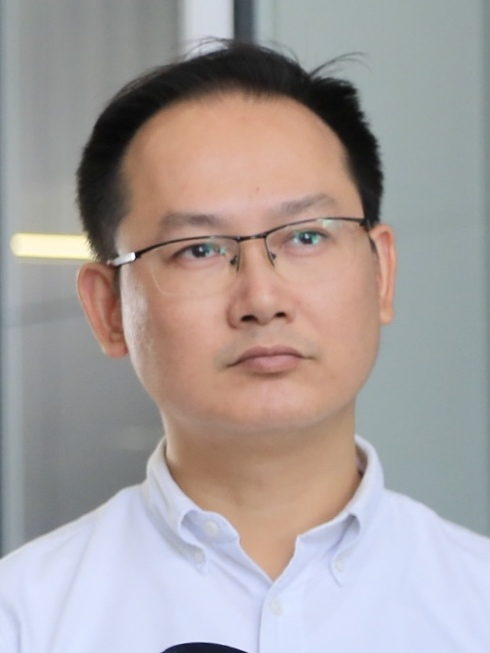
Chan in 2019

Since 2007, Chan has been running and elected in Hong Kong local elections, until being defeated in 2019. Chan has also been participating the party primaries of 2020 Hong Kong Legislative Election, seeking to run the election on behalf of DAB in Hong Kong Island constituency but the campaign was cancelled.

== Controversies ==
=== Defamation of Democratic district councilor Cheng Lai-King ===
Democratic district councilor Cheng Lai-king was arrested on 26 March 2020 for forwarding information of the police officers who was accused of shooting the eye of an Indonesian female journalist during the 2019 September global anti-totalitarian march in Hong Kong. Some members of the Democratic Party, including lawmaker Ted Hui, went to bail, but because the police temporarily requested an increase in bail, they resorted to count the bail immediately outside the police station. However, Chan uploaded a photo on social media accusing Hui for paying the protesters. The accusation of Chan was disproved by Sam Yip, a pro-democracy Central and Western District Council member. The Democratic Party responded by challenging that the photo was taken by the police in the police station, and suspected if the police had facilitated the distribution of rumours.

Legislative Council of Hong Kong
New constituency	Member of Legislative Council; Representative for Hong Kong Island West; 2022–present	Incumbent
