= Sam Yip =

Hong Kong politician (born 1987)

Sam Yip Kam-Lung
- 葉錦龍
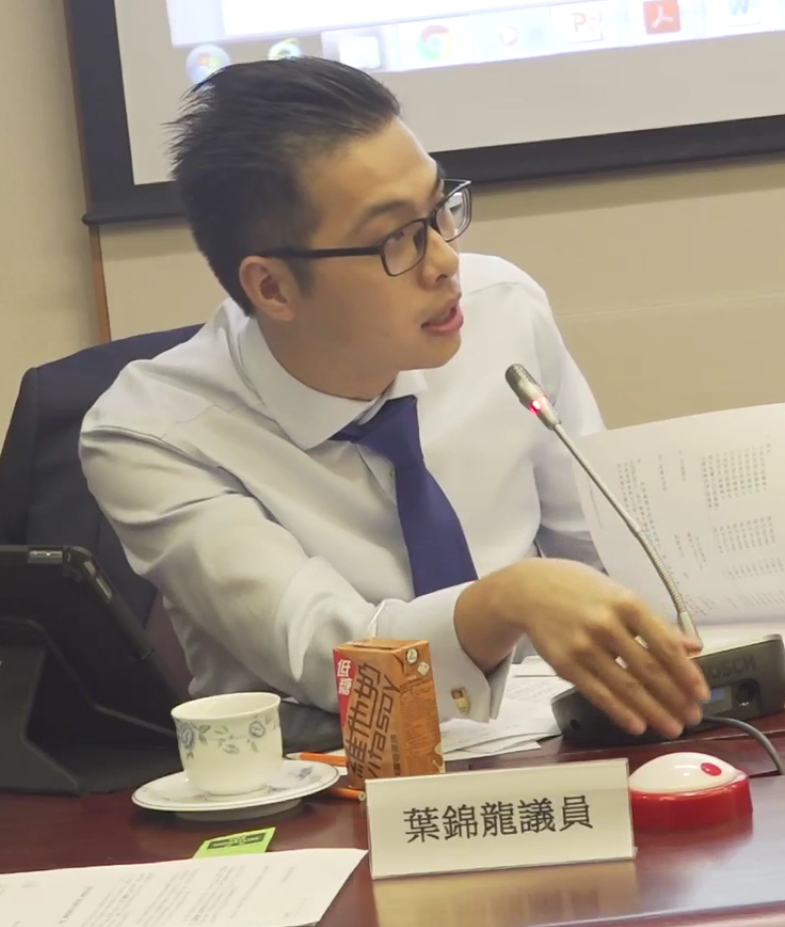
- Yip Kam-Lung Sam

Member of Central and Western District Council
- In office 1 January 2020 – 7 July 2021
- Preceded by: Chan Choi-hi
- Succeeded by: (Vacant)
- Constituency: Shek Tong Tsui

Convenor of Island West Dynamic Movement
- Incumbent
- Assumed office 13 November 2014

Executive Committee of Sai Yau Office
- In office 6 February 2016 – 30 June 2017

Personal details
- Born: 24 August 1987 (age 39) British Hong Kong
- Party: Island West Dynamic Movement
- Education: Swinburne University of Technology (BAvMgt); University of Tokyo (MA); St. Louis School, Hong Kong (Primary Section); King's College, Hong Kong
- Profession: Researcher, translator
- Website: Sam Yip on Facebook https://www.samyip.net/

Sam Yip Kam-Lung (Chinese: 葉錦龍, born 24 August 1987) is a pro-democracy politician in Hong Kong. He was the District Councillor for the Shek Tong Tsui constituency of Hong Kong's Central and Western District Council, one of the founders of Island West Dynamic Movement, host for internet podcast HKpeanut and event supervisor for ACGHK.

== Early life and education ==
Yip was born in Hong Kong in 1987 and was raised in the district of Sai Ying Pun. He studied at St. Louis School (Primary Section) and King's College. Since a young age, Yip has been passionate about transportation vehicles, especially buses, the MTR, and airplanes. This adoration towards airplanes led him to study aircraft maintenance in the Hong Kong Institute of Vocational Education

Being a Japanese anime enthusiast, Yip has self-taught Japanese and taken JLPT exams. With the help of his boss at his part-time job, he joined a Japanese-funded company that specializes in organizing concerts. After taking a working holiday in Japan, he returned to Hong Kong as a project consultant and event supervisor for Creative Paradise of ACGHK.

=== Political Inspiration ===
When Yip was in secondary school, he had loved Chinese History and pay close attention to local issues. Inspired by the protest for preservation of Queen's Pier in 2004, Yip started to enthusiastically participated in social movements.

== Political career ==
Yip took part in the Umbrella Movement from its outbreak on 28 September 2014, stationed on the eastern perimeter of the Admiralty occupation between the Red Cross building and police headquarters, where he met Ng Wing-tak; he was interviewed there by Japanese television.

=== Establishment of Island West Dynamic Movement ===
In November 2014, Yip, Ng Wing-Tak, and Ed Lau founded Island West Dynamic Movement, an organisation focused on social issues in Sai Wan (Western District].

=== 2015 District Council Elections ===
In 2015, Yip stood for 2015 District Council elections in Shek Tong Tsui (constituency). He lost the seat with 41.31% (1,336) of the vote.

==== Political participation after 2015 District Council Election ====
On 25 April 2015, while the Chief Secretary Carrie Lam and others toured three districts on an open-top bus promoting the government's constitutional reform package, Yip joined a protest called by the Hong Kong Federation of Students in Kennedy Town and attempted to run into the road. He was arrested, together with a People Power supporter and a City University student, on suspicion of common assault on a plain-clothes officer. On 12 August 2015 he declined bail and was released without charge. In June 2015, ahead of the Legislative Council vote on the reform package, Yip was a spokesman for the "Citizens Reject Fake Universal Suffrage" campaign organised by the Civil Human Rights Front and other groups.

==== Arrest during the 2019 protests ====
On 1 September 2019, during the 2019–2020 Hong Kong protests, Yip was arrested outside Western Police Station on suspicion of assaulting a police officer and criminal damage; he was then working as an assistant to the legislator Au Nok-hin and as a community officer in Shek Tong Tsui. He declined bail on 2 October 2019 and was released without charge, saying he believed the arrest had been intended to intimidate protesters. He was charged over the same incident in October 2020 and acquitted in November 2021, the magistrate finding that the officers had not produced warrant cards and that it could not be shown they were acting in the due execution of their duty.

=== 2019 District Council Elections ===
Running as a non-partisan candidate for the 2019 elections, he won the seat with 55.27% (3,087) of the vote. From February 2016, Sam Yip ran a 'shadow' district council to "host community photography classes, set up mobile book exchange counters, and teach senior citizens how to use mobile phones (whilst filtering “fake news” circulating on their WhatsApp groups). The venue was also opened up to NGOs."

==== Central and Western District Council (2020–2021) ====
On the council Yip chaired the Traffic and Transport Committee and the district's Environmental Improvement and Greening Working Group and Information Technology Working Group, and was vice-chairman of the newly created Constitutional and Security Affairs Committee.

On 16 January 2020 the Commissioner of Police, Chris Tang, attended the council — the first time the police chief had faced a district council since the 2019–2020 Hong Kong protests began. Yip moved an urgent motion condemning the Commissioner over the handling of complaints of police violence; Tang and the District Officer left the chamber, and the motion passed by 14 votes to one. The government issued a statement the same evening saying it did not agree with the motion, which it said made untrue allegations against the police, and that this was why all attending government officers had withdrawn.

In early February 2020 the Chief Secretary, Matthew Cheung, suspended secretariat support and the use of government meeting rooms for all district councils, leaving them without venues. On 10 February Yip responded with a Facebook post headed "A citywide assembly of citizens' representatives: convening a special joint meeting of the eighteen district councils". He argued that the District Councils Ordinance prescribes no meeting venue, so that a meeting is lawful wherever it is held provided the chairman convenes it and a quorum is present, and that the secretariat remained obliged to publish its minutes. On that basis he proposed that elected councillors from all eighteen districts sit together in a single venue, each council convened in the name of its own chairman, and there pass resolutions — on coordinating the pandemic response, on police conduct in each district, on restoring the municipal councils and on constitutional development — to be entered in the official record. He argued that the councils, elected by more than 2.94 million registered voters without screening, carried a mandate that warranted using their powers to the full.

Seventeen pro-democracy-controlled district councils met jointly on 6 June 2020 to oppose the forthcoming national security law, sitting together at a private venue after government premises were refused. Reporting the day before, the Hong Kong outlet DB Channel traced the idea back to Yip's February post, describing it as the earlier articulation of the "Hong Kong lower house" argument later advanced by the activist Finn Lau, and the joint meeting as the concept's first step into practice.

==== Arrest during the May 2020 protest ====
On 24 May 2020, during a march against the proposed national security law and the national anthem bill, Yip was monitoring police operations in his capacity as a district councillor under the Goose Neck Bridge in Causeway Bay when an officer pushed him from behind without warning, pinned his neck with a knee and arrested him. He was taken to hospital with injuries to the neck and back of the head, the left elbow and knee, and a torn ligament in the right knee. On 26 May he and another arrested district councillor, Li Chi-hung, were released after declining the police bail conditions.

=== Cooperation with Japanese politicians ===
On 26 February 2020, Yip visited Japan and met the members of the House of Representatives, the National Diet of Japan, and political figures. During meetings, he rose concerns over the situation of Hong Kong people on Diamond Princess (ship) and indicated the demands of those people. Besides, Yip also discussed the topic about infection control policy of Hong Kong Government, shortage of surgical masks in Hong Kong and the issue of Hong Kong democratization with Japanese parliament members.

=== Assembly of Citizens' Representatives ===
Yip is representative and secretary-general of the Asia-Pacific Committee of the Assembly of Citizens' Representatives, Hong Kong, a body formed by former pro-democracy legislators and district councillors. In June 2026 he spoke at a rally in Tokyo marking the seventh anniversary of the 2019 protests, organised by former Hong Kong district councillors.

=== 2025 Nikkei interview ===
On 30 June 2025, the fifth anniversary of the Hong Kong national security law, the Japanese newspaper Nikkei published an interview with Yip in its coverage of the anniversary. He said the law applied extraterritorially and that he had become "somewhat inhibited" as a result, that he repeatedly checked his social media posts to avoid breaching it, and that he had at times felt he was being followed. The report noted that Yip has not been placed on the authorities' wanted list. He said he wished to return to Hong Kong but had refrained as a precaution. On 15 July 2025 the Commissioner's Office of China's Ministry of Foreign Affairs in Hong Kong accused Nikkei and BBC News Chinese of "distorted reports, comments or editorials" on the anniversary, saying that "by interviewing exiled anti-China agitators and crafting them as 'victims', they are essentially supporting forces that seek to destabilise Hong Kong". The office did not specify which articles it was referring to.

== Academic career and research ==
While serving as a district councillor, Yip completed a Bachelor of Aviation Management at Swinburne University of Technology in Melbourne in October 2020. He moved to Japan in October 2022 and from December 2022 to December 2024 held a research post at the University of Tokyo's Graduate School of Arts and Sciences. He entered the graduate school's master's programme in April 2023 and completed a Master of Arts in March 2025.

Since June 2025 Yip has been an education and research coordinator at the College of Law and Politics of Rikkyo University and a visiting researcher at the Center for Asian Studies of Kanagawa University.

His research is in the political sociology of Hong Kong and East Asian local politics, centring on the district council system: his master's thesis examined the construction and collapse of democratic society in Hong Kong through a case study of the district councils from 1982 to 2023, and he has presented on the early district boards of the Sino-British transition period, on district management committees since 2019, and on the 2019 district council election. A second strand concerns Chinese pressure on the Japanese content industry in East Asia; he set out that argument in the Asahi Shimbun in 2026, describing the cancellation of Japanese performers' events in mainland China under the stated reason of 不可抗力 ("force majeure") and their subsequent reappearance in Hong Kong under mainland organisers.

== Works ==
- Iida, Maki (25 August 2026). 廣東話的世界：全球超過八千萬人使用的另一種中文，不被同化、收編的獨特語言 [The World of Cantonese] (in Chinese (Taiwan)). Translated by Yip, Kam-lung. Gūsa. p. 256. ISBN 978-626-7891-49-0. Chinese translation of 広東語の世界 (Chūōkōron-Shinsha, 2024).
- 傘後拾年：夏慤村的未圓夢 [Ten years after the umbrella: the unfinished dream of Harcourt Village] (in Chinese (Hong Kong)). 1841. 2024. Contributor.

=== External links ===
- Official website
- Yip Kam Lung Sam at researchmap
