= Water Street (constituency) =

- Elected constituency for the Central & Western District Council
- Boundary of Water Street in Central & Western District
- District: Central & Western
- Legislative Council constituency: Hong Kong Island West
- Population: 14,983 (2019)
- Electorate: 7,408 (2019)

Current constituency
- Created: 1994
- Number of members: One
- Member: Vacant
- Created from: Kennedy Town East; Sai Ying Pun West

Water Street is one of the 15 constituencies of the Central and Western District Council in Hong Kong. The seat elects one member of the council every four years.

The constituency loosely covers the area around the Water Street in Sai Ying Pun with an estimated population of 14,983.

== Councillors represented ==
Election	Member	Party	%
1994	Lee Kam-hang	Democratic	45.98
1999	Lesilie Spencer Tai Cheuk-yin	123DA→Independent	52.72
2003	Lesilie Spencer Tai Cheuk-yin	Independent	51.41
2007	Wong Kin-shing	Democratic	58.04
2011	Wong Kin-shing	Democratic	44.55
2015	Yeung Hok-ming	DAB	53.70
2019	Ho Chi-wang→Vacant (Note: Resigned on 26 May 2021 over new oath-taking law.)	VSA→Independent	59.62

== Election results ==
=== 2010s ===
Central & Western District Council Election, 2019: Water Street
Party	Candidate	Votes	%	±%
Ind. democrat	Louis Ho Chi-wang	3,093	59.62	
DAB	Yeung Hok-ming	2,095	40.38	−13.12
Majority		998	19.24	
Turnout		5,215	70.40	
Ind. democrat gain from DAB		Swing		

Central & Western District Council Election, 2015: Water Street
Party	Candidate	Votes	%	±%
DAB	Yeung Hok-ming	1,878	53.7	+13.1
Democratic	Bonnie Ng Hoi-yan	1,619	46.3	+2.0
Majority		259	7.4	+3.7
Turnout		3,559	49.2	
DAB gain from Democratic		Swing		

Central & Western District Council Election, 2011: Water Street
Party	Candidate	Votes	%	±%
Democratic	Wong Kin-shing	1,353	44.3	−13.7
DAB	Yeung Hok-ming	1,241	40.6	N/A
Independent	Lesilie Spencer Tai Cheuk-yin	443	15.2	N/A
Majority		112	3.7	−19.0
Democratic hold		Swing		

=== 2000s ===
Central & Western District Council Election, 2007: Water Street
Party	Candidate	Votes	%	±%
Democratic	Wong Kin-shing	1,407	58.0	N/A
Nonpartisan	Stephen Yam Chi-ming	777	32.1	N/A
Independent	Huang Han	240	9.9	N/A
Majority		418	22.7	N/A
Democratic gain from Independent		Swing		

Central & Western District Council Election, 2003: Water Street
Party	Candidate	Votes	%	±%
Independent	Lesilie Spencer Tai Cheuk-yin	1,327	51.4	−1.3
Frontier	Robin Wan Joe-yiu	1,254	48.6	
Majority		67	2.8	−2.6
Independent hold		Swing		

=== 1990s ===
Central & Western District Council Election, 1999: Water Street
Party	Candidate	Votes	%	±%
123DA	Lesilie Spencer Tai Cheuk-yin	1,096	52.7	+16.7
Democratic	Robin Wan Joe-yiu	983	47.3	+1.3
Majority		113	5.4	
123DA gain from Democratic		Swing		

Central & Western District Board Election, 1994: Water Street
Party	Candidate	Votes	%	±%
Democratic	Lee Kam-hang	996	46.0	
123DA	Lesilie Spencer Tai Cheuk-yin	779	36.0	
DAB	Chung Yam-cheung	391	18.1	
Majority		217	10.0	
Democratic win (new seat)				
