= Tai Cheuk-yin =

Hong Kong politician

- Traditional Chinese: 戴卓賢
- Simplified Chinese: 戴卓贤
Transcriptions
Yue: Cantonese
- Yale Romanization: Daai Cheuk-yìhn
- Jyutping: Daai^{3} Coek^{3}jin^{4}

Leslie Spencer Tai Cheuk-yin is a Hong Kong politician. He was the last chairman of the pro-Republic of China (Taiwan) Hong Kong political organisation 123 Democratic Alliance.

Tai contested the Hong Kong Legislative Council by-election in 2010 and lost.
