= Kennedy Town & Mount Davis (constituency) =

Constituency of Central and Western District, Hong Kong

- Former Elected constituency for the Central & Western District Council
- Boundary of Kennedy Town & Mount Davis in Central & Western District
- District: Central & Western
- Legislative Council constituency: Hong Kong Island West
- Population: 15,734 (2019)
- Electorate: 7,608 (2019)

Former constituency
- Created: 1982 (first time); 1994 (second time)
- Abolished: 2023
- Number of members: One
- Created from: Kennedy Town & Mount Davis

Kennedy Town & Mount Davis was one of the 15 constituencies in the Central and Western District of Hong Kong.

It returned one member of the district council until it was abolished the 2023 electoral reforms.

Kennedy Town & Mount Davis constituency was loosely based on the Kennedy Town including Sai Wan Estate, Mount Davis and deserted islands Green Island and Little Green Island with estimated population of 15,734.

== Councillors represented ==
Election	Member	Party	%
1982	Chow Yin-sum	Independent	64.64
1985	Constituency abolished		
1994	Yeung Wai-foon	DAB	51.36
1999	Yeung Wai-foon	DAB	53.01
2003	Yeung Wai-foon	DAB	50.14
2007	Chan Hok-fung	DAB	49.05
2007	Chan Hok-fung	DAB	53.97
2007	Chan Hok-fung	DAB	49.32
2019	Cherry Wong Kin-ching→Vacant (Note: Resigned on 3 June 2021 over new oath-taking law.)	Independent→Civic	59.45

== Election results ==
=== 2010s ===
Central & Western District Council Election, 2019: Kennedy Town & Mount Davis
Party	Candidate	Votes	%	±%
PfD	Cherry Wong Kin-ching	3,312	59.45	
DAB	Chan Hok-fung	2,206	39.60	−9.70
Nonpartisan	Mavis Lam Suet-ying	53	0.95	
Majority		1,106	9.85	
Turnout		5,593	73.53	
PfD gain from DAB		Swing		

Central & Western District Council Election, 2015: Kennedy Town & Mount Davis
Party	Candidate	Votes	%	±%
DAB	Chan Hok-fung	1,859	49.3	–4.7
Democratic	Sin Cheuk-nam	1,072	28.4	–7.6
Youngspiration	Chow Sai-kit	838	22.2	
Majority		787	20.9	+12.9
Turnout		3,789	54.1	
DAB hold		Swing		

Central & Western District Council Election, 2011: Kennedy Town & Mount Davis
Party	Candidate	Votes	%	±%
DAB	Chan Hok-fung	1,721	54.0	+5.0
Democratic	Bonnie Ng Hoi-yan	1,468	46.0	N/A
Majority		253	8.0	+1.1
DAB hold		Swing		

=== 2000s ===
Central & Western District Council Election, 2007: Kennedy Town & Mount Davis
Party	Candidate	Votes	%	±%
DAB	Chan Hok-fung	1,417	49.0	−1.1
Democratic Coalition	Winfield Chong Wing-fai	1,269	43.9	−6.0
Independent	Kwan Kin-kei	203	7.3	N/A
Majority		148	6.9	+6.7
DAB hold		Swing	+3.4	

Central & Western District Council Election, 2003: Kennedy Town & Mount Davis
Party	Candidate	Votes	%	±%
DAB	Yeung Wai-foon	1,241	50.1	−2.9
Independent	Winfield Chong Wing-fai	1,234	49.9	+2.9
Majority		7	0.2	−5.8
DAB hold		Swing	-2.9	

=== 1990s ===
Central & Western District Council Election, 1999: Kennedy Town & Mount Davis
Party	Candidate	Votes	%	±%
DAB	Yeung Wai-foon	1,217	53.0	+1.6
Democratic	Chan Kwok-leung	1,079	47.0	−1.6
Majority		138	6.0	+3.2
DAB hold		Swing	+1.6	

Central & Western District Board Election, 1994: Kennedy Town & Mount Davis
Party	Candidate	Votes	%	±%
DAB	Yeung Wai-foon	1,113	50.8	
Democratic	Wong King-hong	1,054	48.1	
Majority		59	2.7	
DAB win (new seat)				

=== 1980s ===
Central & Western District Board Election, 1982: Kennedy Town & Mount Davis
Party	Candidate	Votes	%	±%
Nonpartisan	Chow Yin-sum	3,431	64.6	
Nonpartisan	Yeung Yui-kwan	1,877	35.4	
Majority		1,554	29.0	
Nonpartisan win (new seat)				
