= Peak (constituency) =

Hong Kong constituency

- Former Elected constituency for the Central & Western District Council
- Boundary of Peak in Central & Western District
- District: Central & Western
- Legislative Council constituency: Hong Kong Island West
- Population: 19,447 (2019)
- Electorate: 5,618 (2019)

Former constituency
- Created: 1994
- Abolished: 2023
- Number of members: One
- Created from: Mid Levels East

Peak was one of the 15 constituencies of the Central and Western District Council, Hong Kong. It returned one member of the district council until it was abolished the 2023 electoral reforms.

The constituency covered the Victoria Peak and Mid-Levels area with the estimated population of 19,447. According to the 2016 Census, the population was 52% Chinese, 23% Filipino and 14% White.

== Councillors represented ==
Election	Member	Party	%
1994	Louis Leung Wing-on	Independent	53.24
1999	James Tien Pei-chun	Liberal	65.26
2003	Mark Lin	Liberal	54.15
2007	Tanya Chan	Civic	47.89
2011	Joseph Chan Ho-lim	Liberal	64.73
2015	Joseph Chan Ho-lim	Liberal	85.28
2017 by-election	Jeremy Young Chit-on	Liberal	77.77
2019	Jeremy Young Chit-on	Liberal	68.65

== Election results ==
=== 2010s ===
Central & Western District Council Election, 2019: Peak
Party	Candidate	Votes	%	±%
Liberal	Jeremy Young Chit-on	2,422	68.65	−9.15
2047 HK Monitor	Thomas Uruma Kuninobu	1,106	31.35	
Majority		1,316	37.30	
Turnout		3,536	62.94	
Liberal hold		Swing		

Peak by-election, 2017
Party	Candidate	Votes	%	±%
Liberal	Jeremy Young Chit-on	1,378	77.8	+7.5
Independent	Edward Chin Chi-kin	394	22.2	
Majority		984	55.5	−15.1
Turnout		1,780	33.4	−7.4
Liberal hold		Swing		

Central & Western District Council Election, 2015: Peak
Party	Candidate	Votes	%	±%
Liberal	Joseph Chan Ho-lim	1,837	85.3	+20.6
Independent	Chan Shu-moon	317	14.7	
Majority		1,520	70.6	+41.2
Turnout		2,163	40.8	
Liberal hold		Swing		

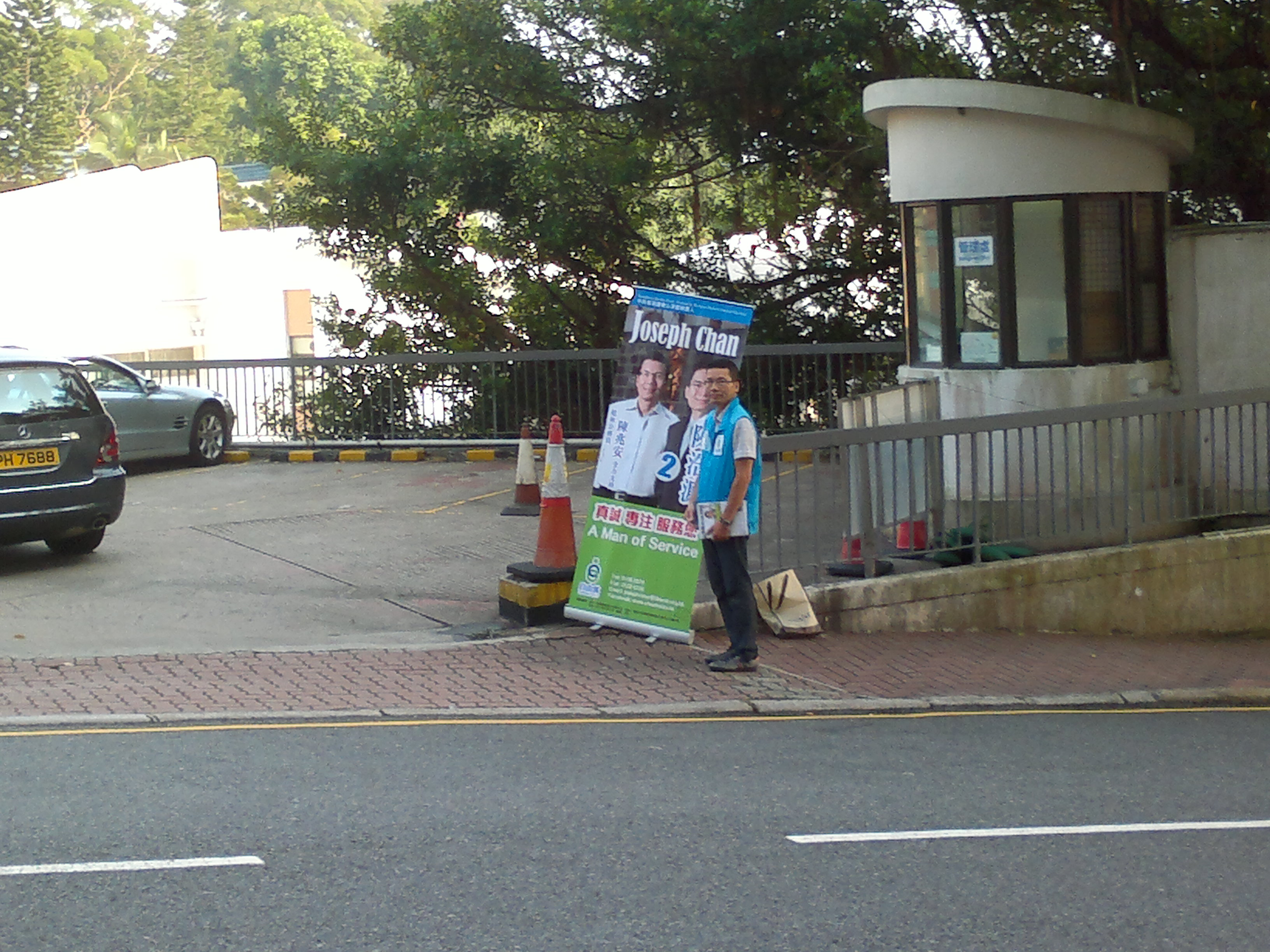
Joseph Chan Ho-lim during the 2011 election.

Central & Western District Council Election, 2011: Peak
Party	Candidate	Votes	%	±%
Liberal	Joseph Chan Ho-lim	1,505	64.7	+23.8
Civic	Tanya Chan	820	35.3	−12.6
Majority		685	29.4	+22.4
Liberal gain from Civic		Swing	+18.2	

=== 2000s ===
Central & Western District Council Election, 2007: Peak
Party	Candidate	Votes	%	±%
Civic	Tanya Chan	795	47.9	N/A
Liberal	Mark Lin	679	40.9	−13.2
Independent	Louis Leung Wing-on	186	11.2	−34.7
Majority		116	7.0	−1.2
Civic gain from Liberal		Swing	+17.4	

Central & Western District Council Election, 2003: Peak
Party	Candidate	Votes	%	±%
Liberal	Mark Lin	672	54.1	−11.2
Independent	Louis Leung Wing-on	569	45.9	+11.2
Majority		103	8.2	−22.4
Liberal hold		Swing	-5.6	

=== 1990s ===
Central & Western District Council Election, 1999: Peak
Party	Candidate	Votes	%	±%
Liberal	James Tien Pei-chun	774	65.3	+34.3
Independent	Louis Leung Wing-on	412	34.7	−18.5
Majority		362	30.6	+8.4
Liberal gain from Independent		Swing	+7.9	

Central & Western District Board Election, 1994: Peak
Party	Candidate	Votes	%	±%
Independent	Louis Leung Wing-on	526	52.8	
Liberal	Chow Kwong-fai	306	30.7	
HKPA	Tang Ping-wing	156	15.6	
Majority		220	22.1	
Independent win (new seat)				
