= Mid Levels East (constituency) =

Hong Kong constituency

- Former elected constituency for the Central & Western District Council
- Boundary of Mid Levels East in Central & Western District
- District: Central & Western
- Legislative Council constituency: Hong Kong Island West
- Population: 16,508 (2019)
- Electorate: 6,708 (2019)

Former constituency
- Created: 1991
- Abolished: 2023
- Number of members: One

Mid Levels East was one of the 15 constituencies in the Central and Western District, and returned one district councillor to the Central and Western District Council. The constituency was established in 1991 and abolished in 2023.

Mids Levels East constituency is loosely based on the eastern part of the Mid-Levels in Central with estimated population of 16,508.

The constituency is created from the Mid Levels and Peak constituency established in 1982, until it was divided into the two Mid Levels East and West constituencies, latter of which would be renamed University.

== Councillors represented ==
=== 1982–85 (as Mid Levels and Peak) ===
Election	Member	Party
1982	唐家榮	Independent

=== 1985–91 (as Mid Levels and Peak) ===
Election	First Member	First Party	Second Member	Second Party
1985	唐家榮	Independent	陳慧芳	Independent
1991	Lam Kin-lai	Independent	陳慧芳	Independent

=== 1991–94 ===
Election	First Member	First Party	Second Member	Second Party
1991	Lam Kin-lai	Nonpartisan	Chow Wai-keung	United Democrat
1994	Lam Kin-lai	Progressive Alliance	Chow Wai-keung	Democratic

=== 1994 to present ===
Election	Member	Party	%
1994	Kwok Ka-ki	Independent	59.39
1999	Kwok Ka-ki	Independent	55.79
2003	Kwok Ka-ki	Independent	57.79
2007	Jackie Cheung Yick-hung	Independent	55.53
2011	Jackie Cheung Yick-hung	Independent	58.05
2015	Ng Siu-hong	Democratic	50.92
2019	Ng Siu-hong→Vacant (Note: Resigned on 30 April 2021 over new oath-taking law.)	Democratic	57.28

== Election results ==
=== 2010s ===
Central & Western District Council Election, 2019: Mid Levels East
Party	Candidate	Votes	%	±%
Democratic	Ng Siu-hong	2,672	57.28	+6.38
DAB	Samuel Mok Kam-sum	1,993	42.72	
Majority		679	14.56	
Turnout		4,685	69.84	
Democratic hold		Swing		

Central & Western District Council Election, 2015: Mid Levels East
Party	Candidate	Votes	%	±%
Democratic	Ng Siu-hong	1,521	50.9	+3.3
Independent	Jackie Cheung Yick-hung	1,466	49.1	–8.9
Majority		55	1.8	–17.6
Turnout		3,013	45.5	
Democratic gain from Independent		Swing	+6.1	

Central & Western District Council Election, 2011: Mid Levels East
Party	Candidate	Votes	%	±%
Independent	Jackie Cheung Yick-hung	1,432	58.0	+2.5
Democratic	Wilhelm Tang Wai-chung	927	37.6	N/A
Independent	Chan Pui-yi	108	4.4	N/A
Majority		505	20.4	+10.4
Independent hold		Swing	N/A	

=== 2000s ===
Central & Western District Council Election, 2007: Mid Levels East
Party	Candidate	Votes	%	±%
Independent	Jackie Cheung Yick-hung	1,370	55.5	+13.3
Democratic Coalition	Helena Yuen Chan Suk-yee	1,097	45.5	−13.3
Majority		273	10	−2.8
Independent gain from CWDP		Swing	+12.2	

Central & Western District Council Election, 2003: Mid Levels East
Party	Candidate	Votes	%	±%
CWDP	Kwok Ka-ki	1,624	57.8	+2.0
Independent	Jackie Cheung Yick-hung	1,186	42.2	N/A
Majority		438	15.6	+4.0
CWDP hold		Swing	+2.0	

=== 1990s ===
Central & Western District Council Election, 1999: Mid Levels East
Party	Candidate	Votes	%	±%
Independent	Kwok Ka-ki	1,074	55.8	−3.6
Independent	Marianne Wong Man-yin	851	44.2	N/A
Majority		223	11.6	−7.2
Independent hold		Swing	-1.8	

Central & Western District Board Election, 1994: Mid Levels East
Party	Candidate	Votes	%	±%
Independent	Kwok Ka-ki	1,018	59.0	
HKPA	Lam Kin-lai	696	40.3	N/A
Majority		322	18.7	
Independent gain from HKPA		Swing		

Central & Western District Board Election, 1991: Mid Levels East
Party	Candidate	Votes	%	±%
Nonpartisan	Lam Kin-lai	1,024	60.3	N/A
United Democrats	Chow Wai-keung	913	53.7	N/A
United Democrats	Gerry Wai Ka-cheung	857	50.4	N/A
Nonpartisan win (new seat)				
United Democrats win (new seat)				
