= Cheng Lai-king =

Hong Kong district councillor

- Traditional Chinese: 鄭麗琼
- Simplified Chinese: 郑丽琼
Transcriptions
Standard Mandarin
- Hanyu Pinyin: Zhèng Lìqióng
Yue: Cantonese
- Jyutping: Zeng^{6} Lai^{6} King^{4}

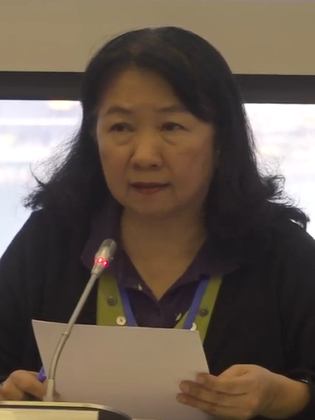
District Councillor Cheng Lai-king

Cheng Lai-king (Chinese: 鄭麗琼, born 1959 or 1960) is a Hong Kong politician, former District Councillor for the Castle Road constituency, and former chairwoman of the Central and Western District Council, a seat she held from its creation in 1994 to her resignation from the District Council in July 2021. Her strongest electoral result was in 2003 when she secured 73.6% (1,625 votes). In the 2019 elections, she held the seat with 51.05% (2,669 votes). She is presently a member of the Democratic Party and a registered social worker.

== Political career ==
Cheng served as Bonnie Ng's campaign manager during the 2017 District Council by-election, in which Ng's campaign posters were suspiciously vandalised. In July 2019, Cheng criticised the government's crackdown on 12 June 2019, and asked Chief Executive Carrie Lam to resign, retracting the government's classification of the 12 June protest as a "riot", and set up an independent commission of inquiry. In August, she released a joint statement along with four other Democratic Party district councillors in the Central and Western District, condemning police officers for using tear gas in densely populated residential districts without warning, leading to respiratory health concerns. Cheng was elected chair of the Central and Western District Council for the 2020–23 term during the council's first meeting on 2 January 2020, with fellow Democratic Party councillor Victor Yeung elected as vice-chair.

=== January 2020 meeting controversy and subsequent harassment ===
A Central and Western District Council meeting held on 16 January 2020 discussed issues relating to the police's use of force and was attended by the Commissioner of Police, Chris Tang, with several plainclothes police officers on standby at the venue. Cheng requested the plainclothes officers to display their warrant cards; one officer who refused to show his warrant card was evicted from the venue.

Cheng subsequently questioned Tang regarding the number of people who had been "raped, sent to China, suicided (被自殺)"; other pro-democracy district councillors also added questions on law enforcement tactics by police during the 2019 protests. A group of pro-government protesters at the venue, including activist Shek Fong-yau, yelled slogans and clapped after Tang spoke; many of these protesters were expelled by Cheng. Cheng later said on social media that she received an average of four to five unsolicited calls without a caller ID between 16 and 17 January, though the callers did not say anything upon her responding.

=== March 2020 arrest ===
On 26 March 2020, Hong Kong police arrested Cheng under a sedition law. She was alleged to have shared the identity of a police officer who fired a baton round that blinded a journalist during the 2019–20 Hong Kong protests.

Members of the Democratic Party, including lawmaker Ted Hui, went to bail Cheng out of jail. When the police requested an unanticipated and unexplained increase in bail money by an additional $5,000 HKD, the party members raised the money in cash immediately outside the police station. Pro-Beijing politician Chan Hok-Fung later uploaded a photo of the scene onto social media, accusing Hui of bribing protesters. The accusation was denied by Sam Yip, a pro-democracy Central and Western District Council member. The Democratic Party later released a statement suggesting that the photo could only have been taken from within the police station, and alleged that the situation was orchestrated by the police to slander the party. Later reports suggested that the Democratic Party filed a complaint with the Independent Police Complaints Council.

On 19 October 2020, Cheng was sentenced to 28 days' imprisonment, suspended for 12 months, for civil contempt of court through the sharing of the policeman's identity in contravention of a court injunction.

== Bibliography ==
- 2011 District Council Election Results (Central & Western)
- 2007 District Council Election Results (Central & Western)
- 2003 District Council Election Results (Central & Western)
- 1999 District Council Election Results (Central & Western)

Political offices
New constituency	Member of the Central and Western District Council; Representative for Castle Road; 1994–2021	Vacant
Preceded by Yip Wing-shing	Chairman of the Central and Western District Council; 2020–2021	Vacant
