= Sai Ying Pun (constituency) =

Constituency of the Central and Western District Council of Hong Kong

- Former Elected constituency for the Central & Western District Council
- Boundary of Sai Ying Pun in Central & Western District
- District: Central & Western
- Legislative Council constituency: Hong Kong Island West
- Population: 14,815 (2019)
- Electorate: 7,303 (2019)

Former constituency
- Created: 1982 (first time); 1994 (second time)
- Abolished: 2023
- Number of members: One
- Created from: Sai Ying Pun East; Sai Ying Pun West

Sai Ying Pun was one of the 15 constituencies in the Central and Western District, until the electoral reforms of 2023.

Sai Ying Pun constituency was loosely based on the northern part of Sai Ying Pun with estimated population of 14,815.

== Councillors represented ==
Election	Member	Party	%
1982	Lee Tat-yu	Civic Association	41.16
1985	Constituency abolished		
1994	Lai Kwok-hung	Democratic→Independent	47.86
1999	Lai Kwok-hung	Independent	50.10
2003	Lai Kwok-hung	Independent	53.28
2007	Loretta Lo Yee-hang	DAB	61.30
2011	Loretta Lo Yee-hang	DAB	67.57
2015	Loretta Lo Yee-hang	DAB	59.79
2019	Napo Wong Weng-chi	Independent	55.39

== Election results ==
=== 2010s ===
Central & Western District Council Election, 2019: Sai Ying Pun
Party	Candidate	Votes	%	±%
Nonpartisan	Napo Wong Weng-chi	2,734	55.39	
DAB	Timothy Lau Tin-ching	2,202	44.61	−15.19
Majority		532	10.78	
Turnout		4,955	67.85	
Nonpartisan gain from DAB		Swing		

Central & Western District Council Election, 2015: Sai Ying Pun
Party	Candidate	Votes	%	±%
DAB	Loretta Lo Yee-hang	1,790	59.8	–7.8
Nonpartisan	Ng Wing-tak	1,204	40.2	
Majority		586	19.6	–22.4
Turnout		3.026	41.5	
DAB hold		Swing		

Central & Western District Council Election, 2011: Sai Ying Pun
Party	Candidate	Votes	%	±%
DAB	Loretta Lo Yee-hang	1,875	67.6	+6.3
Democratic	Yong Chak-cheong	711	25.6	N/A
People Power	Yuen Man-ho	189	6.8	N/A
Majority		1,164	42.0	+15.4
DAB hold		Swing	N/A	

=== 2000s ===
Central & Western District Council Election, 2007: Sai Ying Pun
Party	Candidate	Votes	%	±%
DAB	Loretta Lo Yee-hang	1,850	61.3	+14.6
Independent	Lai Kwok-hung	1,168	38.7	−14.6
Majority		682	24.6	
DAB gain from Independent		Swing		

Central & Western District Council Election, 2003: Sai Ying Pun
Party	Candidate	Votes	%	±%
Independent (CWDP)	Lai Kwok-hung	1,744	53.3	+3.2
DAB	Chan Yiu-keung	1,529	46.7	−3.2
Majority		215	6.6	+6.4
Independent hold		Swing		

=== 1990s ===
Central & Western District Council Election, 1999: Sai Ying Pun
Party	Candidate	Votes	%	±%
Independent	Lai Kwok-hung	1,248	50.1	+2.2
DAB	Chan Yiu-keung	1,243	49.9	+24.6
Majority		5	0.2	−21.0
Independent hold		Swing		

Central & Western District Board Election, 1994: Sai Ying Pun
Party	Candidate	Votes	%	±%
Democratic	Lai Kwok-hung	1,142	47.7	
Independent	Leung Ying-yeung	641	26.8	
DAB	Chan Yiu-keung	603	25.2	
Majority		501	20.9	
Democratic win (new seat)				

=== 1980s ===
Central & Western District Board Election, 1982: Sai Ying Pun
Party	Candidate	Votes	%	±%
Civic	Lee Tat-yu	1,780	41.2	
Nonpartisan	Tang Yee-lin	1,332	30.8	
Reform	Leung Ying-yeung	1,213	28.0	
Majority		448	10.4	
Civic win (new seat)				
