= Tung Wah (constituency) =

Constituency of the Central and Western District, Hong Kong

- Former Elected constituency for the Central & Western District Council
- Boundary of Tung Wah in Central & Western District
- District: Central & Western
- Legislative Council constituency: Hong Kong Island West
- Population: 12,904 (2019)
- Electorate: 5,729 (2019)

Former constituency
- Created: 1994
- Abolished: 2023
- Number of members: One
- Created from: Sheung Wan

Tung Wah was one of the 15 constituencies in the Central and Western District of Hong Kong.

It returned one member of the district council until it was abolished the 2023 electoral reforms.

Tung Wah constituency was loosely based on the area around Tung Wah Hospital in Sheung Wan with estimated population of 12,904.

== Councillors represented ==
Election	Member	Party	%
1994	Wong Man-biu	Democratic	70.04
1999	Frederick Ho Chun-ki	Democratic	62.19
2003	Frederick Ho Chun-ki	Democratic	75.06
2007	Frederick Ho Chun-ki	Democratic	59.95
2011	Kathy Siu Ka-yi	DAB	53.09
2015	Kathy Siu Ka-yi	DAB	57.98
2017 by-election	Bonnie Ng Hoi-yan→Vacant (Note: Resigned on 8 July 2021 over new oath-taking law.)	Democratic	52.67
2019	Bonnie Ng Hoi-yan→Vacant	Democratic	60.84

== Election results ==
=== 2010s ===
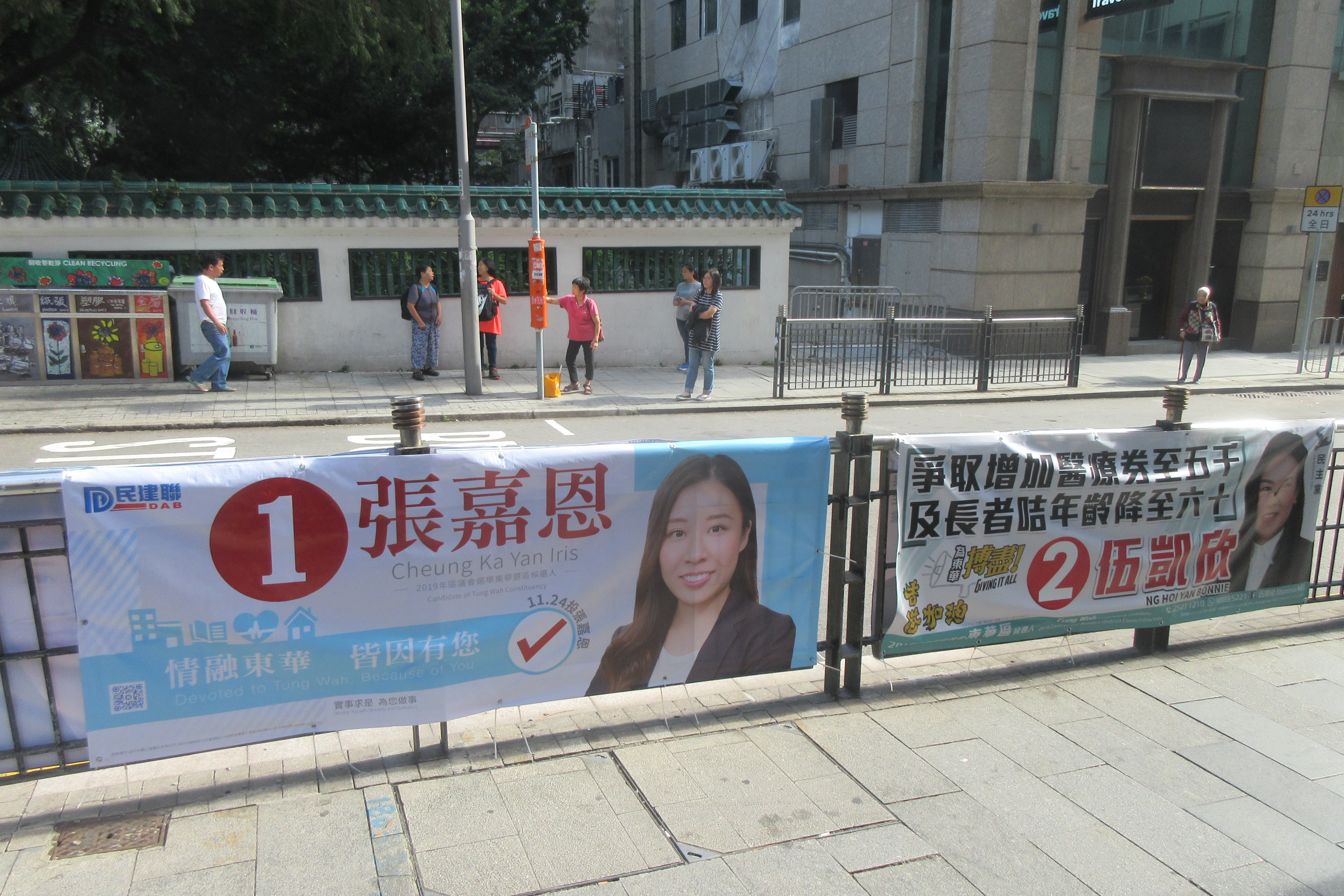
Election banners in the 2019 District Council elections.

Central & Western District Council Election, 2019: Tung Wah
Party	Candidate	Votes	%	±%
Democratic	Bonnie Ng Hoi-yan	2,403	60.84	+8.14
DAB	Iris Cheung Ka-yan	1,547	39.16	
Majority		856	21.68	
Turnout		3,963	69.19	
Democratic hold		Swing		

Tung Wah by-election, 2017
Party	Candidate	Votes	%	±%
Democratic	Bonnie Ng Hoi-yan	1,034	52.7	+5.3
Independent	Ambrose Lui Kam-keung	909	46.3	
Independent	Olivia Lau Shu-yin	20	1.0	
Majority		125	6.4	−9.6
Turnout		1,973	38.8	−6.2
Democratic gain from DAB		Swing		

Central & Western District Council Election, 2015: Tung Wah
Party	Candidate	Votes	%	±%
DAB	Kathy Siu Ka-yi	1,352	58.0	+4.9
Democratic	Frederick Ho Chun-ki	980	42.0	+0.8
Majority		372	16.0	+4.1
Turnout		2,376	46.0	
DAB hold		Swing		

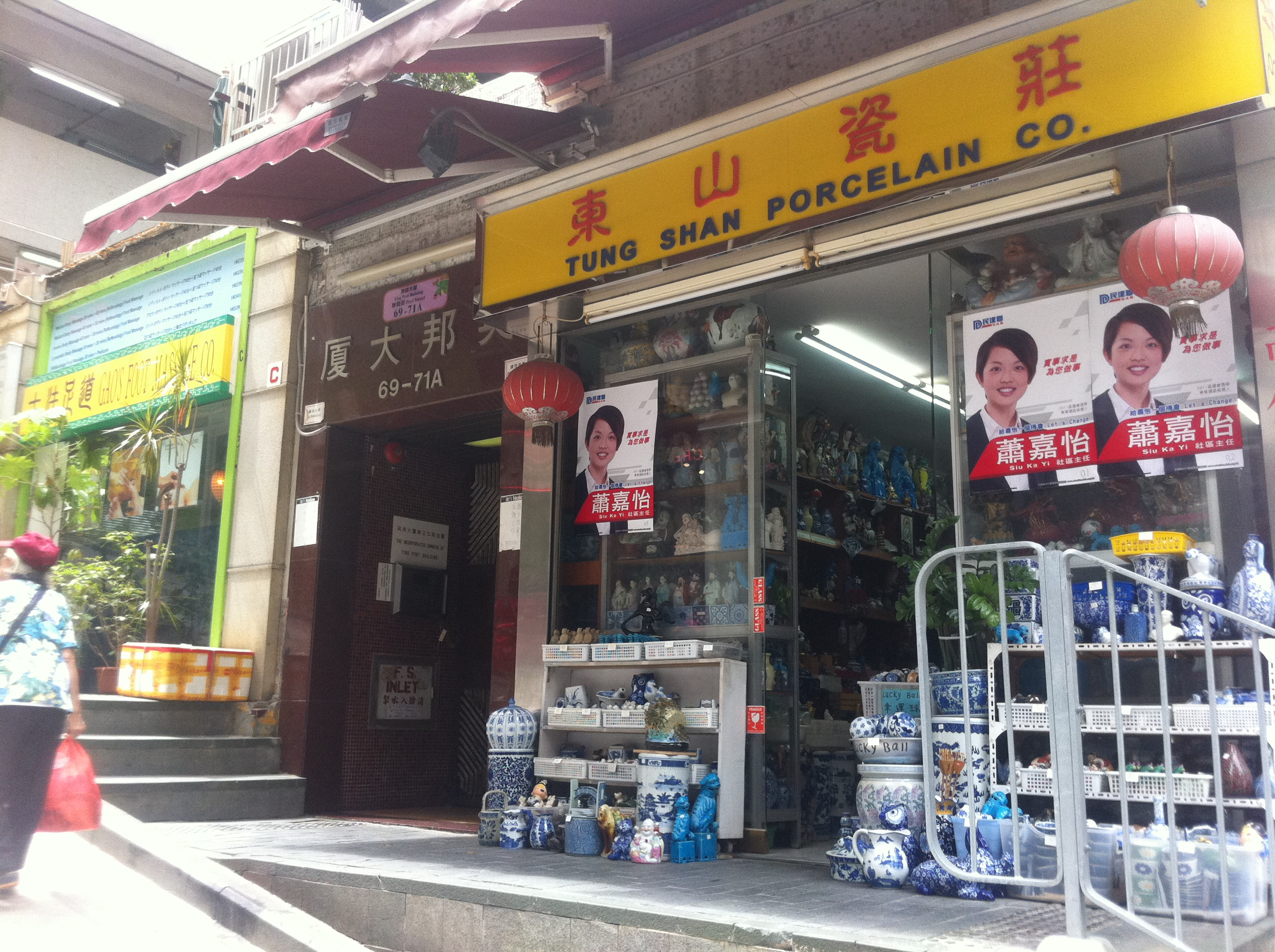
Siu Ka-yi's election poster in the 2011 election.

Central & Western District Council Election, 2011: Tung Wah
Party	Candidate	Votes	%	±%
DAB	Kathy Siu Ka-yi	1,168	53.1	+13.1
Democratic	Frederick Ho Chun-ki	907	41.2	−18.8
People Power	Lee Siu-cheong	125	5.7	N/A
Majority		261	11.9	
DAB gain from Democratic		Swing	+16.0	

=== 2000s ===
Central & Western District Council Election, 2007: Tung Wah
Party	Candidate	Votes	%	±%
Democratic	Frederick Ho Chun-ki	1,033	60.0	−15.1
DAB	Siu Ka-yi	690	40.0	+15.1
Majority		343	20.0	−30.2
Democratic hold		Swing		

Central & Western District Council Election, 2003: Tung Wah
Party	Candidate	Votes	%	±%
Democratic	Frederick Ho Chun-ki	1,348	75.1	+10.3
DAB	Lee Wing-fai	448	24.9	−10.3
Majority		900	50.2	+20.6
Democratic hold		Swing		

=== 1990s ===
Central & Western District Council Election, 1999: Tung Wah
Party	Candidate	Votes	%	±%
Democratic	Frederick Ho Chun-ki	898	64.8	−5.2
DAB	Cheng Chi-keung	546	35.2	+5.2
Majority		352	29.6	−11.4
Democratic hold		Swing		

Central & Western District Board Election, 1994: Tung Wah
Party	Candidate	Votes	%	±%
Democratic	Wong Man-biu	1,314	70.0	N/A
DAB	Kwan Hin-wah	562	30.0	N/A
Majority		752	40.0	
Democratic win (new seat)				
