= Bonnie Ng =

District councillor

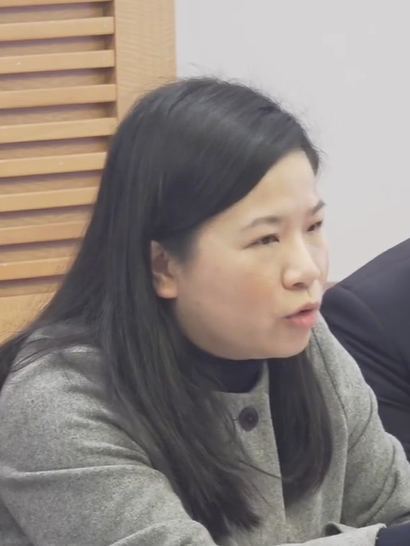
Bonnie Ng

Bonnie Ng Hoi-yan (伍凱欣) is a Chinese politician who was a Former District Councillor for the Tung Wah constituency in Hong Kong.

She won the seat in the 2017 by-election, with 52.7% (1,034) of the vote, and retained the seat in 2019 increasing her vote to 60.84% (2,403) of the vote with a gain of +8.14%. She describes herself as being in the "progressive democrat camp".
