= Kwun Lung (constituency) =

Hong Kong constituency

- Former Elected constituency for the Central & Western District Council
- Boundary of Kwun Lung in Central & Western District
- District: Central & Western
- Legislative Council constituency: Hong Kong Island West
- Population: 15,273 (2019)
- Electorate: 8,989 (2019)

Former constituency
- Created: 1994
- Abolished: 2023
- Number of members: One
- Created from: Kennedy Town & Mount Davis

Kwun Lung was one of the 15 constituencies in the Central and Western District.

It returned one member of the district council until it was abolished the 2023 electoral reforms.

Kwun Lung constituency was loosely based on the area around Kwun Lung Lau in Kennedy Town with estimated population of 15,273.

== Councillors represented ==
| Election | Member | Party | % |
|---|---|---|---|
| 1994 | Ip Kwok-him | DAB | 52.26 |
| 1999 | Ip Kwok-him | DAB | 57.63 |
| 2003 | Cyd Ho Sau-lan | Frontier/Civic Act-up | 50.87 |
| 2007 | Ip Kwok-him | DAB | 85.00 |
| 2011 | Ip Kwok-him | DAB | 73.67 |
| 2015 | Yeung Hoi-wing | DAB | 61.35 |
| 2019 | Fergus Leung Fong-wai→Vacant (Note: Resigned on 30 April 2021 after being arrested under national security law.) | Independent | 50.69 |

== Election results ==
=== 2010s ===
Central & Western District Council Election, 2019: Kwun Lung
| Party | Candidate | Votes | % | ±% |
|---|---|---|---|---|
| Independent | Fergus Leung Fong-wai | 3,195 | 50.69 | |
| DAB | Yeung Hoi-wing | 2,970 | 47.12 | −14.28 |
| VSA | Chow Sai-kit | 138 | 2.19 | |
| Majority | | 225 | 3.57 | |
| Turnout | | 6,316 | 70.29 | |
| Independent gain from DAB | | Swing | | |

Central & Western District Council Election, 2015: Kwun Lung
| Party | Candidate | Votes | % | ±% |
|---|---|---|---|---|
| DAB | Yeung Hoi-wing | 2,491 | 61.4 | –12.3 |
| Youngspiration | Sixtus Leung Chung-hang | 1,569 | 38.6 | |
| Majority | | 922 | 22.8 | –24.6 |
| Turnout | | 4,110 | 50.1 | |
| DAB hold | | Swing | | |

Central & Western District Council Election, 2011: Kwun Lung
| Party | Candidate | Votes | % | ±% |
|---|---|---|---|---|
| DAB | Ip Kwok-him | 2,723 | 73.7 | −10.3 |
| LSD | Leung Kwok-hung | 973 | 26.3 | N/A |
| Majority | | 1,750 | 47.4 | −28.1 |
| DAB hold | | Swing | N/A | |

=== 2000s ===
Central & Western District Council Election, 2007: Kwun Lung
| Party | Candidate | Votes | % | ±% |
|---|---|---|---|---|
| DAB | Ip Kwok-him | 2,702 | 85.0 | +35.9 |
| Nonpartisan | Ho Loy | 315 | 9.9 | N/A |
| Independent | Jacky Leong Kim-kam | 162 | 5.1 | N/A |
| Majority | | 2,387 | 75.1 | +73.3 |
| DAB gain from Frontier | | Swing | N/A | |

Central & Western District Council Election, 2003: Kwun Lung
| Party | Candidate | Votes | % | ±% |
|---|---|---|---|---|
| Frontier (Civic Act-up) | Cyd Ho Sau-lan | 1,869 | 50.9 | N/A |
| DAB | Ip Kwok-him | 1,805 | 49.1 | −8.5 |
| Majority | | 64 | 0.8 | −14.4 |
| Frontier gain from DAB | | Swing | 25.1 | |

=== 1990s ===
Central & Western District Council Election, 1999: Kwun Lung
| Party | Candidate | Votes | % | ±% |
|---|---|---|---|---|
| DAB | Ip Kwok-him | 1,552 | 57.6 | +4.8 |
| Democratic | Rosa Mok Pui-han | 1,141 | 42.4 | −4.8 |
| Majority | | 411 | 15.2 | +10.1 |
| DAB hold | | Swing | +5.0 | |

Central & Western District Board Election, 1994: Kwun Lung
| Party | Candidate | Votes | % | ±% |
|---|---|---|---|---|
| DAB | Ip Kwok-him | 2,011 | 51.9 | |
| Democratic | Nicky Wong Shui-lai | 1,837 | 47.7 | |
| Majority | | 174 | 4.2 | |
| DAB win (new seat) | | | | |
