= Chan Choi-hi =

Dominic Chan Choi-hi 陳財喜
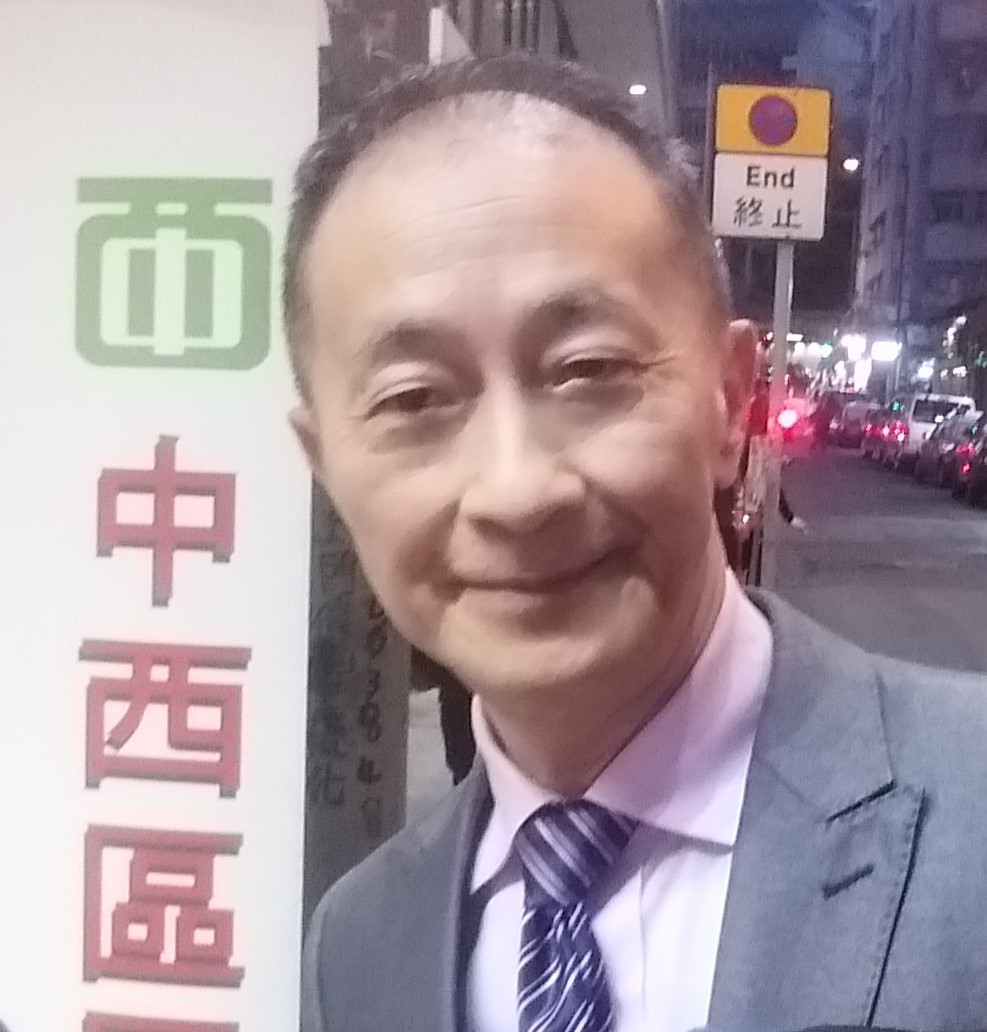

Member of the Provisional Legislative Council
- In office 21 December 1996 – 30 June 1998

Personal details
- Born: 15 January 1956 (age 70) Hong Kong
- Children: 2
- Education: University of Toronto
- Occupation: Company director

Dominic Chan Choi-hi (born 15 January 1956 in Hong Kong) was the member of the Central and Western District Council since 1988 until he lost his seat in 2019. He represented Shek Tong Tsui. He was the also member of the Provisional Legislative Council. He was the member of the Meeting Point and then the Democratic Party until he was expelled from the party in 1996 when he joined the Provisional Legislative Council in which the party boycotted it. He co-founded the think tank New Century Forum in 1999.

Political offices
New constituency	Member of Central and Western District Council; Representative for Shek Tong Tsui; 1994–2019	Succeeded by Sam Yip Kam-lung
Legislative Council of Hong Kong
New parliament	Member of Provisional Legislative Council; 1997–1998	Replaced by Legislative Council
