= Central and Western District Council =

Hong Kong district council

Central and Western District Council 中西區區議會

Type
- Type: Hong Kong District Council of the Central and Western District

History
- Founded: 18 March 1982 (District Board); 1 July 1997 (Provisional); 1 January 2000 (District Council)

Leadership
- Chair: David Leung Chi-kei, Independent

Structure
- Seats: 20 councillors consisting of 4 elected members 8 district committee members 8 appointed members
- DAB: 6 / 20
- Liberal: 2 / 20
- FTU: 1 / 20
- Independent: 11 / 20

Elections
- Voting system: First past the post
- Last election: 10 December 2023

Meeting place
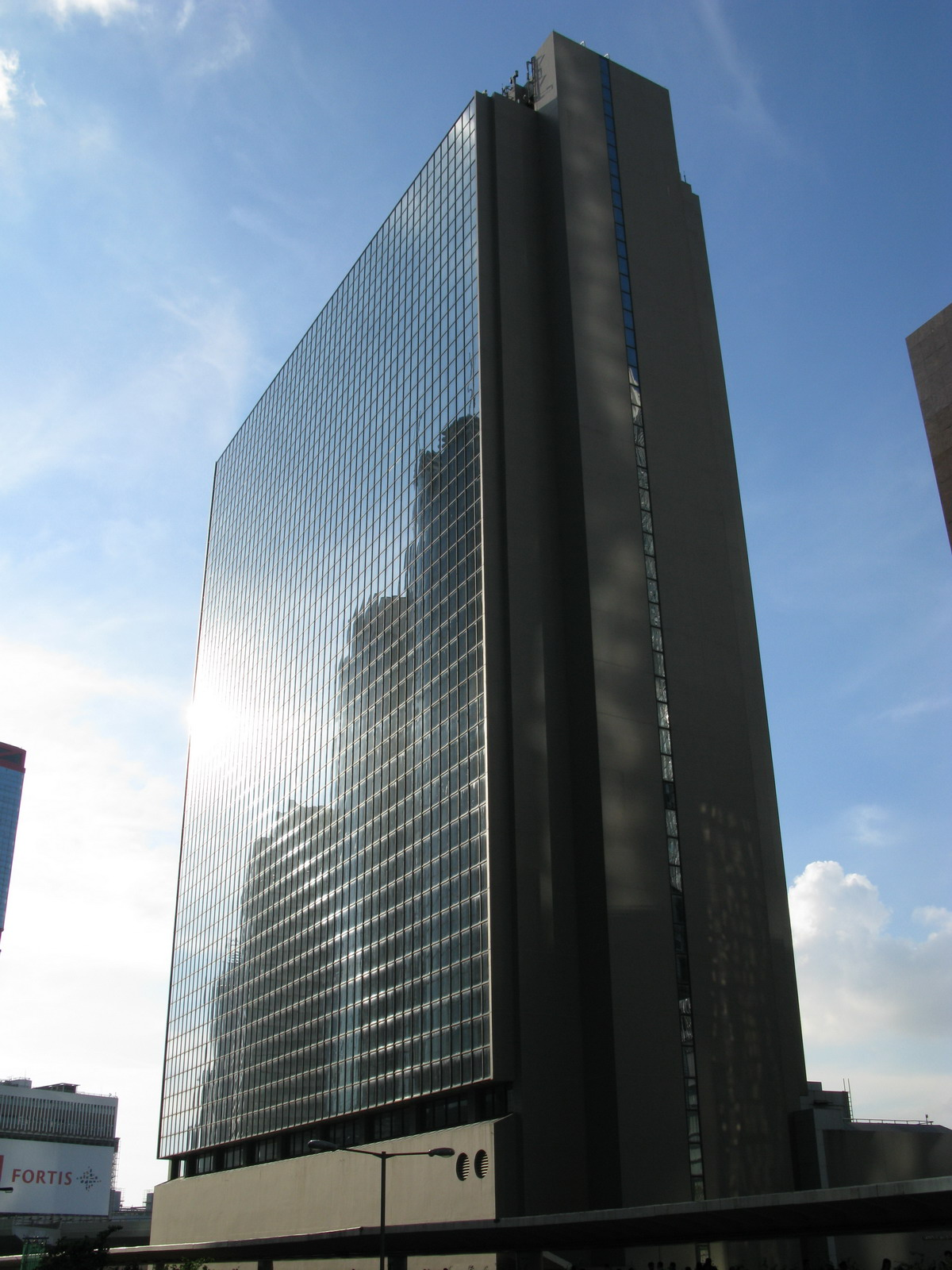
- 11/F, Harbour Building, 38 Pier Road, Central, Hong Kong

Website
- www.districtcouncils.gov.hk/central/

Central and Western District Council
- Traditional Chinese: 中西區區議會
Transcriptions
Yue: Cantonese
- Yale Romanization: Jūng sāi kēui kēui yih wuih
- Jyutping: Zung1 sai1 koei1 keoi1 ji6 wui6

The Central and Western District Council (noted as Central) is the district council for the Central and Western District in Hong Kong. It is one of 18 such councils. The Central and Western District Council currently consists of 20 members, of which the district is divided into two constituencies, electing a total of 4 members, 8 district committee members, and 8 appointed members. The last election was held on 10 December 2023.

== History ==
The Central and Western District Council was established on 18 March 1982 under the name of the Central and Western District Board as the result of the colonial Governor Murray MacLehose's District Administration Scheme reform. The District Board was partly elected with the ex-officio Urban Council members, as well as members appointed by the Governor until 1994 when last Governor Chris Patten refrained from appointing any member.

The Central and Western District Board became Central and Western Provisional District Board after the Hong Kong Special Administrative Region (HKSAR) was established in 1997 with the appointment system being reintroduced by Chief Executive Tung Chee-hwa. The Central and Western District Council was established on 1 January 2000 after the first District Council election in 1999. The council has become fully elected when the appointed seats were abolished in 2011 after the modified constitutional reform proposal was passed by the Legislative Council in 2010.

The Central and Western Board was largely non-partisan in the 1980s. In the 1985 election, an electoral coalition of 12 incumbents based on personal network surrounding Vincent Ko Hon-chiu of the Hong Kong People's Association, later the board chairman, contested in the election, winning 10 seats in total. The board gradually divided into liberal and conservative blocs in the late 1980s and split into pro-democracy United Democrats of Hong Kong (UDHK) and the conservative Liberal Democratic Federation of Hong Kong (LDF) which were formed in 1990.

The Democratic Party, the merger of UDHK and Meeting Point, took control of the board from 1994 to 1997 after the abolishment of the appointed seats. The Democratic majority was offset by the pro-Beijing camp when appointed seats were reintroduced in 1997. In the 2003 tide of democracy after the July 1 protest, the pro-democrats formed the Central and Western Democratic Power for the 2003 election and won seven seats, which saw pro-democrat Legislative Councillor Cyd Ho defeating Ip Kwok-him of the Democratic Alliance for the Betterment of Hong Kong (DAB) in his long-held constituency of Kwun Lung. Democratic Party's Kam Nai-wai was able to take the chairmanship with the help of appointed member Wu Chor-nam. Kam's decision to co-operate with an appointed member sparked controversy which caused Kam to resign soon afterwards.

The Democratic Party remained the largest party in the council until the 2007 election when the DAB surpassed the Democratic Party in the number of seats for the first time. In the by-elections in 2017 for Peak and Tung Wah, the pro-Beijing and pro-democracy camps took each of the seats, giving the Democrats the same numbers of seat as the DAB, both commanding five seats.

In the 2019 election amid the ongoing pro-democracy protests, the pro-democrats scored a historic landslide victory by taking 14 of the 15 seats, with DAB being completely wiped out from the council and its legislator Cheung Kwok-kwan being ousted in Sai Wan. The Democratic Party became the largest party with seven seats with Cheng Lai-king and Victor Yeung taking the chair and vice chair posts respectively.

== Political control ==
Since 1982 political control of the council has been held by the following parties:

Camp in control	Largest party	Years	Composition
No Overall Control	Civic Association	1982 - 1985	
No Overall Control	People's Association	1985 - 1988	
No Overall Control	HKAS → United Democrats	1988 - 1991	
Pro-government	United Democrats	1991 - 1994	
Pro-democracy	Democratic (majority)	1994 - 1997	
Pro-Beijing	Democratic	1997 - 1999	
Pro-Beijing	Democratic	2000 - 2003	
Pro-Beijing	Democratic	2004 - 2007	
Pro-Beijing	Democratic	2008 - 2011	
Pro-Beijing	DAB	2012 - 2015	
Pro-Beijing	DAB → DAB/Democratic	2016 - 2019	
Pro-democracy	Democratic	2020 - 2023	
Pro-Beijing	Independent	2024 - 2027	

== Political makeup ==
Elections are held every four years.

Political party	Council members											
Political party	1982	1985	1988	1991	1994	1999	2003	2007	2011	2015	2019	2023
DAB					2	3	1	3	5	6		2
Independent	4	2	3	3	3	5	3	4	5	4	7	1
Liberal					1	1	2	1	1	1	1	1
Democratic					8	5	6	6	4	4	7	
Civic								1				
CWDP							2					
Frontier							1					
HKPA						1						
United Democrats				5								
LDF				2								
Civic	1			1								
FTU				1								
Meeting Point			2	1								
HKAS			5									
Reform		1	1									
PHKS			1									
ADPL			1									
Central and Western District Coalition		10										
Total elected members	5	13	13	13	14	15	15	15	15	15	15	4
Other members	12	6	7	6	0	4	4	4	3	0	0	16

1994

1999

2003

2007

2011

2015

2019

== Members represented ==
Capacity	Code	Constituency	Name	Political affiliation	Term		Notes
Elected	A01	Central	Jan Noel Shih	DAB	1 January 2024	Incumbent	
Elected	A01	Central	Karl Fung Kar-leung	Liberal	1 January 2024	Incumbent	
Elected	A02	Western	Timothy Lau Tin-ching	DAB	1 January 2024	Incumbent	
Elected	A02	Western	Mandy Wong Sin-man	Independent	1 January 2024	Incumbent	
District Committees			Yeung Hok-ming	DAB	1 January 2024	Incumbent	
District Committees			Iris Cheung Ka-yan	DAB	1 January 2024	Incumbent	
District Committees			Yeung Hoi-wing	DAB	1 January 2024	Incumbent	
District Committees			Sidney Lee Chi-hang	Independent	1 January 2024	Incumbent	
District Committees			Zhang Zong	Independent	1 January 2024	Incumbent	
District Committees			Law Kam-fai	Independent	1 January 2024	Incumbent	
District Committees			Chiu Wah-kuen	Independent	1 January 2024	Incumbent	
District Committees			Wu Man-hin	Independent	1 January 2024	Incumbent	
Appointed			Ip Yik-nam	DAB	1 January 2024	Incumbent	
Appointed			Ben Lui Hung-pan	FTU	1 January 2024	Incumbent	
Appointed			Jeremy Young Chit-on	Liberal	1 January 2024	Incumbent	
Appointed			Ng Yin	Independent	1 January 2024	Incumbent	
Appointed			Qiu Songqing	Independent	1 January 2024	Incumbent	
Appointed			Jin Ling	Independent	1 January 2024	Incumbent	
Appointed			Eugene Chan Kin-keung	Independent	1 January 2024	Incumbent	
Appointed			Yip Wing-shing	Independent	1 January 2024	Incumbent	

== Leadership ==
=== Chairs ===
Between 1985 and 2023, the chairman is elected by all the members of the council.

Chairman	Years	Political Affiliation
A. G. Cooper	1982–1983	District Officer
Lolly Chiu Yuen-chu	1983–1984	District Officer
Lam Kam-kwong	1984–1985	District Officer
Vincent Ko Hon-chiu	1985–1988	People's Association
Ambrose Lau Hon-chuen	1988–1994	Independent→PA
Yuen Bun-keung	1994–1997	Democratic
Stephen Chan Chit-kwai	1997–2000	Independent
Wu Chor-nam	2000–2003	Independent
Chan Tak-chor (Note: Democratic Party's Kam Nai-wai was initially elected as chairman but soon resigned from the office.)	2004–2011	Liberal→Independent
Yip Wing-shing	2012–2019	Independent
Cheng Lai-king	2020–2021	Democratic
David Leung Chi-kei	2024–present	District Officer

=== Vice Chairs ===
Vice Chairman	Years	Political Affiliation
Chan Tak-chor	2000–2003	Liberal
Wu Chor-nam	2004–2007	Independent
Stephen Chan Chit-kwai	2008–2011	Independent
Chan Hok-fung	2012–2019	DAB
Victor Yeung Sui-yin	2020–2023	Democratic→Independent
