= 2015 Eastern District Council election =

Hong Kong local election

- 22 November 2015

All 35 seats to Eastern District Council 18 seats needed for a majority
- Turnout: 49.8%
	First party	Second party	Third party
Party	DAB	FTU	Civic
Last election	16 seats, 13.3%	1 seat, 3.1%	3 seats, 8.2%
Seats before	13	6	3
Seats won	10	6	4
Seat change	▼3	Steady	▲1
Popular vote	16,722	11,190	11,007
Percentage	15.3%	10.2%	10.1%
Swing	▼2.0%	▲6.9%	▲1.9%
	Fourth party	Fifth party	Sixth party
Party	Democratic	Liberal	Labour
Last election	2 seats, 12.5%	2 seats, 1.6%	New party
Seats before	2	3	0
Seats won	2	2	1
Seat change	Steady	▼1	▲1
Popular vote	9,106	4,390	6,642
Percentage	8.3%	4.0%	6.1%
Swing	▼4.2%	▲2.4%	N/A
- Colours on map indicate winning party for each constituency.

The 2015 Eastern District Council election was held on 22 November 2015 to elect all 35 members to the Eastern District Council.

The most surprising result was Chui Chi-kin, an "umbrella soldier" inspired by the 2014 Hong Kong protests almost unknown to the public before he was elected, beat DAB legislator Christopher Chung Shu-kun with 2,017 votes against Chung's 1,829 votes in Yue Wan.

== Overall election results ==
Before election:

↓
5	1	31
PD	I.	Pro-Beijing

Change in composition:

↓
10	25
Pro-democracy	Pro-Beijing

Eastern District Council election result 2015
Party	Seats	Gains	Losses	Net gain/loss	Seats %	Votes %	Votes	+/−
Independent	10	5	1	+4	28.6	36.8	40,224	
DAB	10	0	3	–3	28.6	15.3	16,722	−2.0
FTU	6	0	0	0	17.1	10.2	11,190	+7.1
Civic	4	1	0	+1	11.4	10.1	11,007	+1.9
Democratic	2	0	0	0	5.7	8.3	9,106	−4.2
NPP	0	0	2	–2	0	6.3	6,844	+1.7
Labour	1	1	0	+1	2.9	6.1	6,642	
Liberal	2	0	0	0	5.7	4.0	4,390	+2.4
LSD	0	0	0	0	0	1.8	1,969	–6.8
People Power	0	0	0	0	0	1.1	1,229	
