= Jennifer Chow =

Hong Kong politician

Jennifer Chow Kit-bing

Personal details
- Born: 13 March 1955 Guangdong, China
- Occupation: Hong Kong Politician

Jennifer Chow Kit-bing, BBS, MH (Chinese: 周潔冰) is a Hong Kong politician and was a member of the Wan Chai District Council for the Victoria Park constituency.

== Early life ==
Chow grew up in North Point, Hong Kong and was married with a daughter. She runs a small furniture company with her husband in Wan Chai which later developed into a corporation. In 1988, she first contested in the District Board elections in the Eastern District Board and was elected along with Man Sai-cheong from the Hong Kong Affairs Society. She ran in the 1991 LegCo elections and was defeated by Man Sai-cheong and Martin Lee from the United Democrats of Hong Kong.

== Politics ==
She had been a member of the Liberal Party in the eve of the 1994 District Board elections but quit in the late 1990s. She was also a member of the Urban Council of Hong Kong before it was abolished in 2000. She stood in the LegCo elections several times, including 1998 and 2000. She was one of the candidates in the 2000 Hong Kong Island by-election but was defeated by pro-democracy independent Audrey Eu.

In 2012, she joined the pro-Beijing Democratic Alliance for the Betterment and Progress of Hong Kong (DAB) on the eve of the LegCo election. She joined the DAB ticket and helped Christopher Chung Shu-kun elected to the Legislative Council.

In 2015 District Council election, her constituency was transferred into Wan Chai District Council where she was elected uncontested. She lost her seat in 2019, defeated by Gary Li.

Political offices
Preceded by Wong Tin-cho	Member of the Eastern District Board; Representative for Causeway Bay North; 1988–1994	Constituency abolished
New constituency	Member of the Eastern District Council; Representative for Victoria Park; 1994–2015	Constituency transferred to Wan Chai District
New constituency	Member of the Urban Council; Representative for North Point West; 1995–1997	Replaced by Provisional Urban Council
New creation	Member of the Provisional Urban Council; 1997–1999	Council abolished
New constituency	Member of the Wan Chai District Council; Representative for Victoria Park; 2015–2019	Succeeded by Li Wing-choi
