= Lok Hin Terrace =

Public housing estate in Chai Wan, Hong Kong

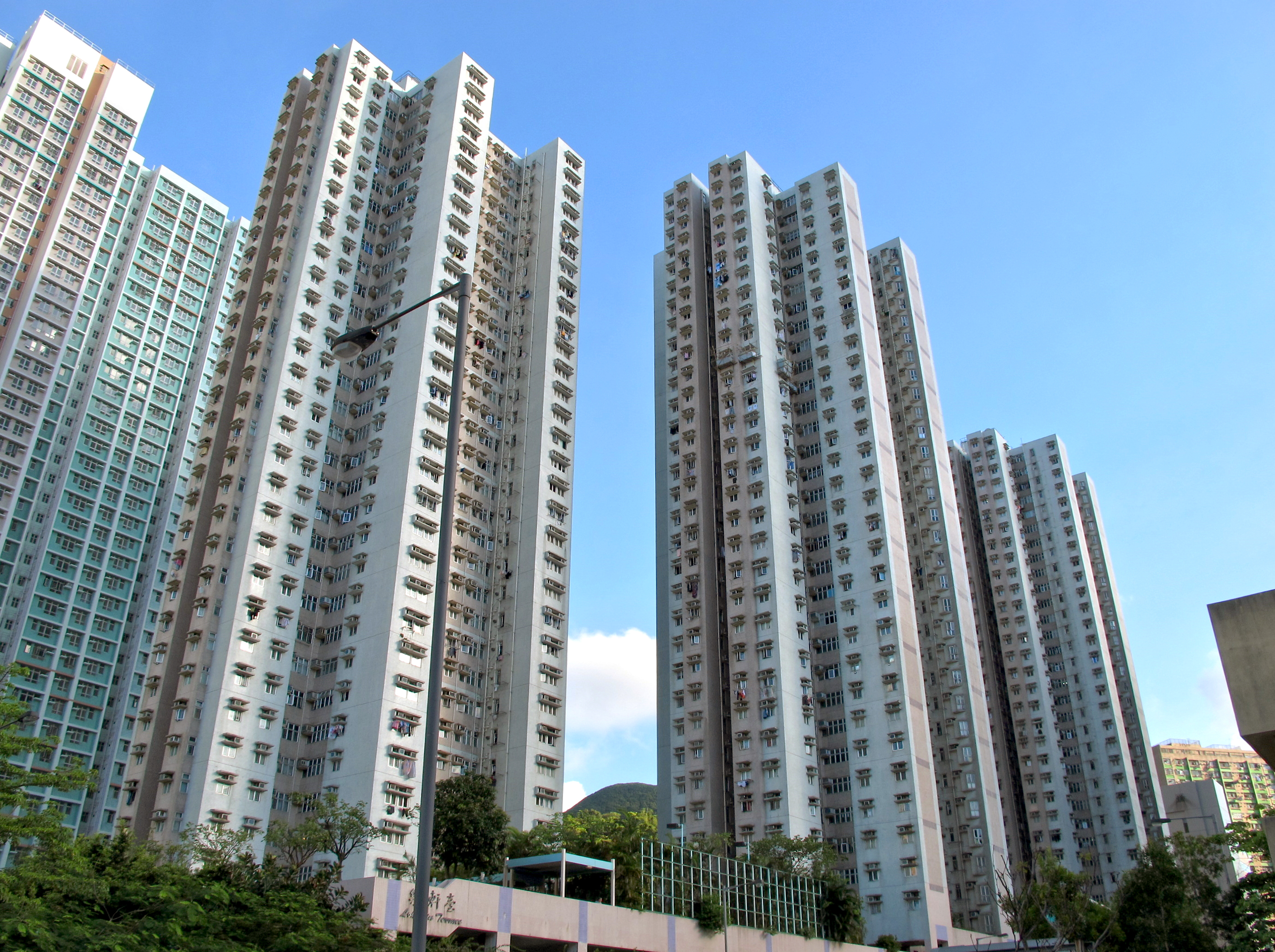
- Lok Hin Terrace
- Interactive map of Lok Hin Terrace

General information
- Location: 350 Chai Wan Road, Chai Wan; Hong Kong Island, Hong Kong
- Coordinates: 22.264063°N 114.241028°E
- Status: Completed
- Category: Public rental housing
- Population: 4,588 (2016)
- No. of blocks: 5
- No. of units: 1,550

Construction
- Constructed: 1995; 31 years ago
- Contractors: Genius Project Development Company Limited
- Authority: Hong Kong Housing Authority

Lok Hin Terrace (Chinese: 樂軒臺) is a Home Ownership Scheme and Private Sector Participation Scheme court in Chai Wan, Hong Kong Island, Hong Kong near Walton Estate and Yue Wan Estate. Formerly the site of Block 1 to 8 of old Chai Wan Estate, it was jointly developed by the Hong Kong Housing Authority and Genius Project Development Company Limited and has a total of five residential blocks built in 1995.

== Houses ==
Name	Chinese name	Building type	Completed
Block 1	第1座	Private Sector Participation Scheme	1995
Block 2	第2座	Private Sector Participation Scheme	1995
Block 3	第3座	Private Sector Participation Scheme	1995
Block 4	第4座	Private Sector Participation Scheme	1995
Block 5	第5座	Private Sector Participation Scheme	1995

== Demographics ==
According to the 2016 by-census, Lok Hin Terrace had a population of 4,588. The median age was 48.9 and the majority of residents (94.6 per cent) were of Chinese ethnicity. The average household size was 3 people. The median monthly household income of all households (i.e. including both economically active and inactive households) was HK$35,530.

== Politics ==
Lok Hin Terrace is located in Yue Wan constituency of the Eastern District Council. It was formerly represented by Chui Chi-kin, who was elected in the 2019 elections until May 2021.

== See also ==
- Public housing estates in Chai Wan and Siu Sai Wan
