= Aldrich Bay (constituency) =

Constituency in Hong Kong

- Elected constituency for the Eastern District Council
- Boundary of Aldrich Bay in Eastern District
- District: Eastern
- Legislative Council constituency: Hong Kong Island East
- Population: 17,610 (2019)
- Electorate: 12,133 (2019)

Current constituency
- Created: 2003
- Number of members: One
- Member: Vacant
- Created from: Shaukeiwan

Aldrich Bay (Chinese: 愛秩序灣) is one of the 35 constituencies in the Eastern District.

The constituency returns one district councillor to the Eastern District Council, with an election every four years. The seat was last held by So Yat-hang.

Aldrich Bay has estimated population of 17,610.

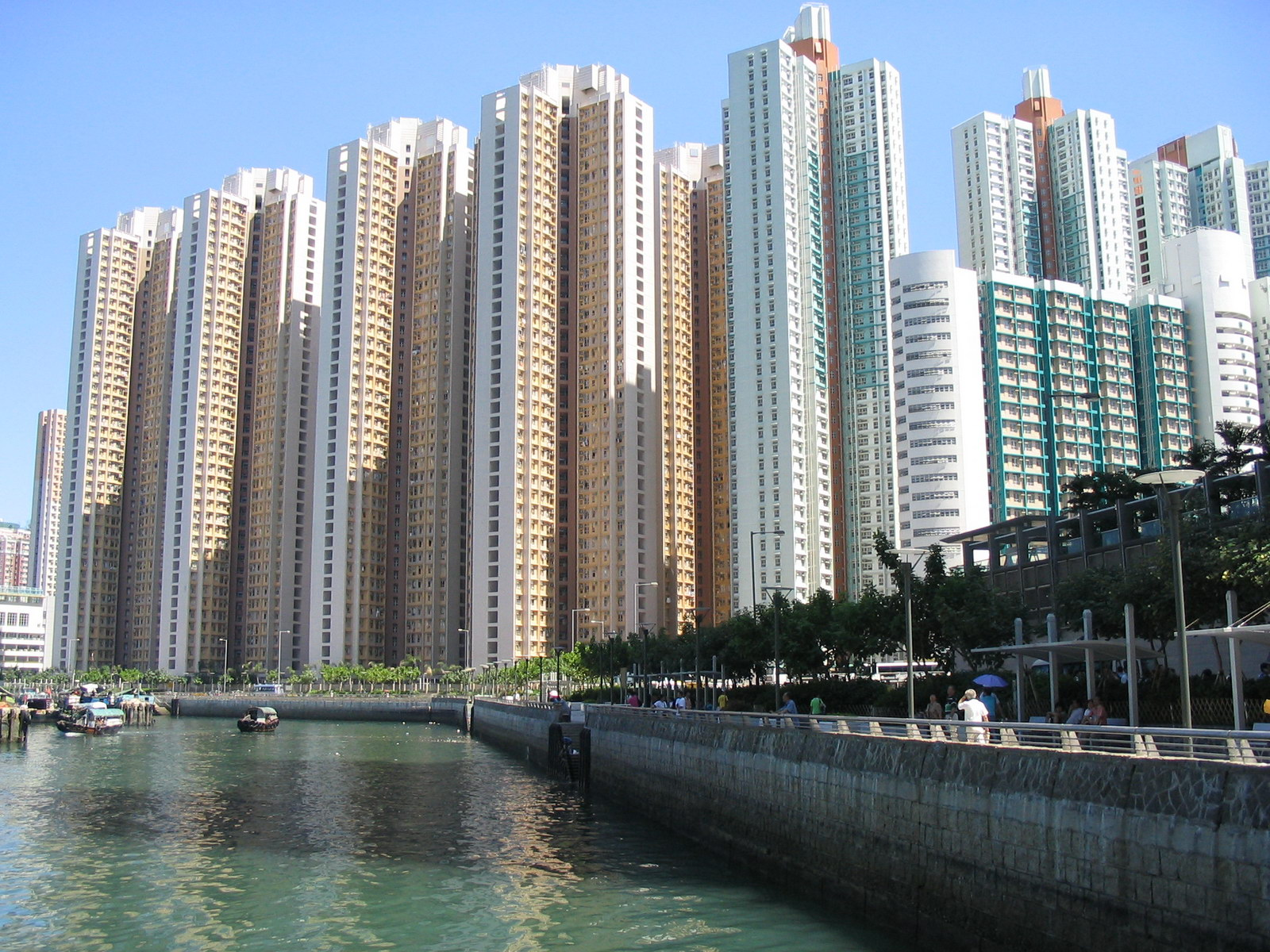
Aldrich Bay public housing

== Councillors represented ==
Election	Member	Party	%
2003	Mark Li Kin-yin	Democratic	53.89
2007	Ngan Chun-lim	DAB	47.20
2011	Ngan Chun-lim	DAB	N/A
2015	Ngan Chun-lim	DAB	53.11
2019	So Yat-hang→Vacant (Note: Disqualified on 15 September 2021 after his oath was invalid due to his involvement in pro-democracy primaries.)	Democratic	54.39

== Election results ==
=== 2010s ===
Eastern District Council Election, 2019: Aldrich Bay
Party	Candidate	Votes	%	±%
Democratic	So Yat-hang	4,600	54.39	+7.50
DAB	Kwok Wing-kin	3771	44.59	−8.52
ASEA	Simon Yuen Tak-chun	86	1.02	
Majority		829	9.80	+3.58
Turnout		8,491	69.99	+25.06
Democratic gain from DAB		Swing		

Eastern District Council Election, 2015: Aldrich Bay
Party	Candidate	Votes	%	±%
DAB	Ngan Chun-lim	2,720	53.11	
Democratic	Chan Kar-pak	2,401	46.89	
Majority		319	6.22	
Turnout		5,121	45.43	
DAB hold		Swing		

Eastern District Council Election, 2011: Aldrich Bay
Party	Candidate	Votes	%	±%
DAB	Ngan Chun-lim	Unopposed		
DAB hold		Swing		

=== 2000s ===
Eastern District Council Election, 2007: Aldrich Bay
Party	Candidate	Votes	%	±%
DAB	Ngan Chun-lim	2,430	47.20	+1.09
Democratic	Mark Li Kin-yin	1,780	34.58	−19.31
Independent	Ada Choi Ngar-chun	654	12.70	
Liberal	George Lam Kei-tung	284	5.52	
Majority		650	12.62	
DAB gain from Democratic		Swing	+10.20	

Eastern District Council Election, 2003: Aldrich Bay
Party	Candidate	Votes	%	±%
Democratic	Mark Li Kin-yin	2,584	53.89	
DAB	Ngan Chun-lim	2,211	46.11	
Majority		373	7.78	
Democratic win (new seat)				
