= Yue Wan Estate =

Public housing estate in Chai Wan, Hong Kong

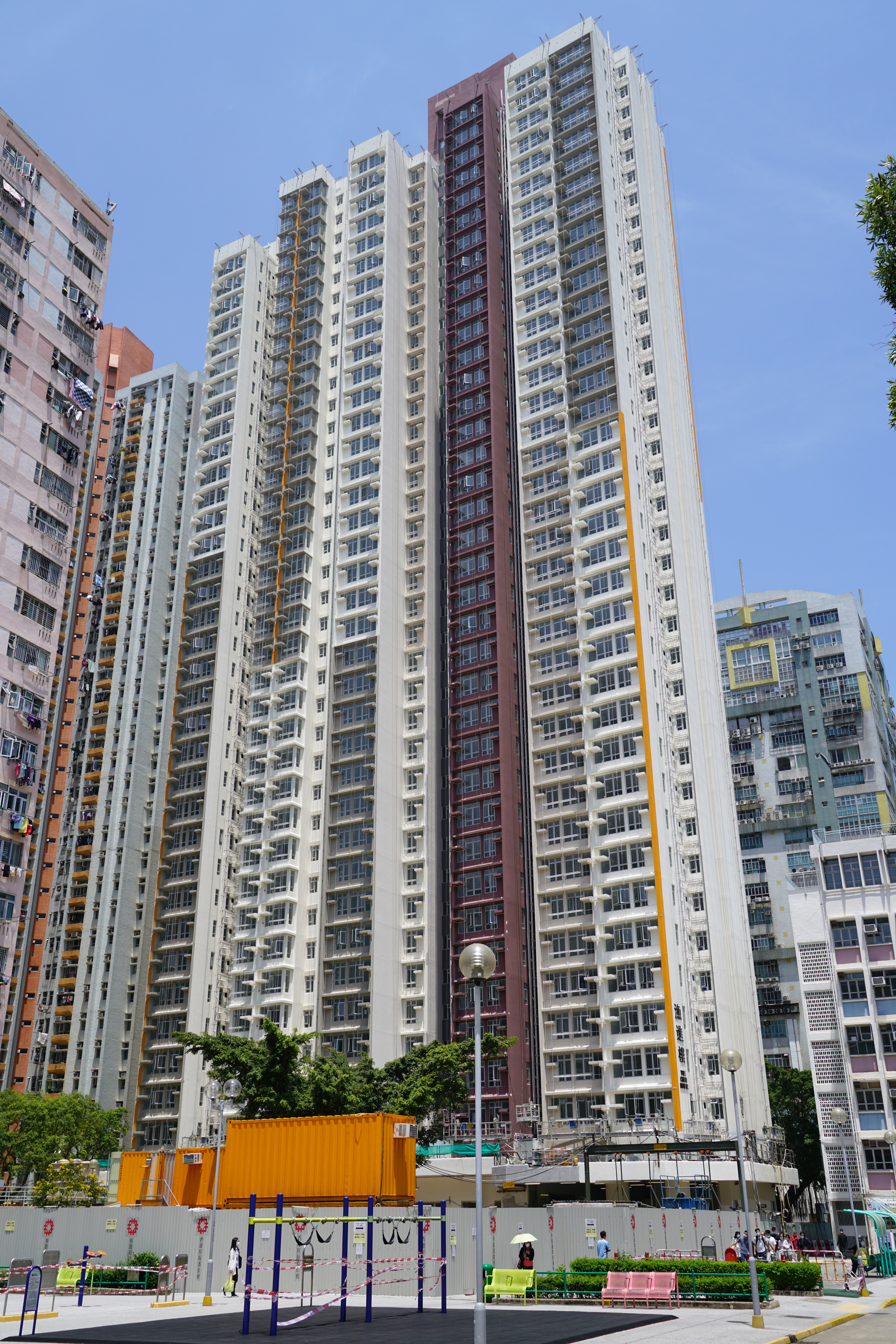
- Yue Shun House of Yue Wan Estate
- Interactive map of Yue Wan Estate

General information
- Location: 365 Chai Wan Road, Chai Wan; Hong Kong Island, Hong Kong
- Coordinates: 22.26585°N 114.24118°E
- Status: Completed
- Category: Public rental housing
- Population: 5,074 (2016)
- No. of blocks: 5
- No. of units: 3,008

Construction
- Constructed: 1977; 49 years ago
- Authority: Hong Kong Housing Authority

Yue Wan Estate (Chinese: 漁灣邨) is a public housing estate in Chai Wan, Hong Kong Island, Hong Kong, near Chai Wan Park, Tsui Wan Estate and Tsui Lok Estate. Built on the reclaimed land in Chai Wan, the estate consists of 4 residential blocks, which were developed in 2 phases and built in 1977 and 1978 respectively.

== Background ==
Yue Wan Estate was constructed in two phases, the first phase is Yue Fung House, Yue On House and Yue Tai House completed in 1977, and the second phase is Yue Shun House completed in 1978. There were originally two primary school buildings in Yue Wan Estate that were leased by the Housing Authority to the school sponsoring organization, but one of the primary schools (TWGHs & LKWFSL Mrs. Fung Yiu Hing Memorial Primary School) had been demolished and rebuilt into Yue Chun House, which has 826 units. It was completed in the second quarter of 2020 and was occupied on 17 September of the same year.

== Houses ==
Name	Chinese name	Building type	Completed
Yue Fai House	漁豐樓	Old Slab	1977
Yue On House	漁安樓	Old Slab	1977
Yue Tai House	漁泰樓	Old Slab	1977
Yue Shun House	漁順樓	Old Slab	1978
Yue Chun House	漁進樓	Non-Standard	2020

== Demographics ==
According to the 2016 by-census, Yue Wan Estate had a population of 5,074. The median age was 47.1 and the majority of residents (96.6 per cent) were of Chinese ethnicity. The average household size was 2.4 people. The median monthly household income of all households (i.e. including both economically active and inactive households) was HK$20,750.

== Politics ==
Yue Wan Estate is located in Yue Wan constituency of the Eastern District Council. It was formerly represented by Chui Chi-kin, who was elected in the 2019 elections until May 2021.

== Education ==
Yue Wan Estate is in Primary One Admission (POA) School Net 16. Within the school net are multiple aided schools (operated independently but funded with government money) and two government schools: Shau Kei Wan Government Primary School and Aldrich Bay Government Primary School.

== See also ==
- Public housing estates in Chai Wan and Siu Sai Wan
