= 2019 Eastern District Council election =

Hong Kong local election

- 24 November 2019

All 35 seats to Eastern District Council 18 seats needed for a majority
- Turnout: 72.1% ▲22.3%
	First party	Second party	Third party
Party	Civic	Democratic	Labour
Last election	4 seats, 10.1%	2 seats, 8.3%	1 seat, 6.1%
Seats before	4	2	1
Seats won	5	4	2
Seat change	▲1	▲2	▲1
Popular vote	18,505	16,797	8,094
Percentage	8.0%	7.2%	3.5%
Swing	▼2.1%	▼1.1%	▼2.6%
	Fourth party	Fifth party	Sixth party
Party	DAB	FTU	Liberal
Last election	10 seats, 15.3%	6 seats, 10.2%	2 seats, 4.0%
Seats before	11	6	2
Seats won	1	1	1
Seat change	▼10	▼5	▼1
Popular vote	40,151	17,478	8,622
Percentage	17.3%	7.5%	3.7%
Swing	▲2.0%	▼2.7%	▼0.3%
	Seventh party	Eighth party	Ninth party
Party	HTTHECG	SKWEF	LSD
Last election	New party	New party	0 seat, 1.8%
Seats before	0	0	0
Seats won	1	1	1
Seat change	▲1	▲1	▲1
Popular vote	5,389	4,204	3,563
Percentage	2.3%	1.8%	1.5%
Swing	N/A	N/A	▼0.3%
- Colours on map indicate winning party for each constituency.

The 2019 Eastern District Council election was held on 24 November 2019 to elect all 35 members to the Eastern District Council of Hong Kong.

The pro-democrats achieved the majority of the council for the first time in a historic landslide victory amid the pro-democracy protests, taking 32 of the 35 seats in the council, with many of the pro-Beijing strongholds in North Point falling into the hands of pro-democracy independents.

== Overall election results ==
Before election:

↓
10	25
Pro-democracy	Pro-Beijing

Change in composition:

↓
32	3
Pro-democracy	PB

Eastern District Council election result 2019
Party	Seats	Gains	Losses	Net gain/loss	Seats %	Votes %	Votes	+/−
Independent	17	14	6	+8	51.4	38.5	89,552	
DAB	1	0	10	–10	2.9	17.3	40,151	+2.0
Civic	5	1	0	+1	14.2	8.0	18,505	−2.1
FTU	1	0	5	−5	2.9	7.5	17,478	−2.7
Democratic	4	2	0	+2	11.4	7.2	16,797	−1.1
NPP	0	0	0	0	0	4.8	11,054	−1.5
Liberal	1	0	1	−1	2.9	3.7	8,622	−0.3
Labour	2	1	0	+1	5.7	3.5	8,094	−2.6
HTTHECG	1	1	0	+1	2.9	2.3	5,389	
BPA	0	0	0	0	0	2.1	4,868	
SKWEF	1	1	0	+1	2.9	1.8	4,204	
PfD	1	1	0	+1	2.9	1.7	3,982	
LSD	1	1	0	+1	2.9	1.5	3,563	–0.3
ASEA	0	0	0	0	0	0.1	176	
