= Hing Wah Estate =

Public housing estate in Chai Wan, Hong Kong

Hing Wah (I) Estate
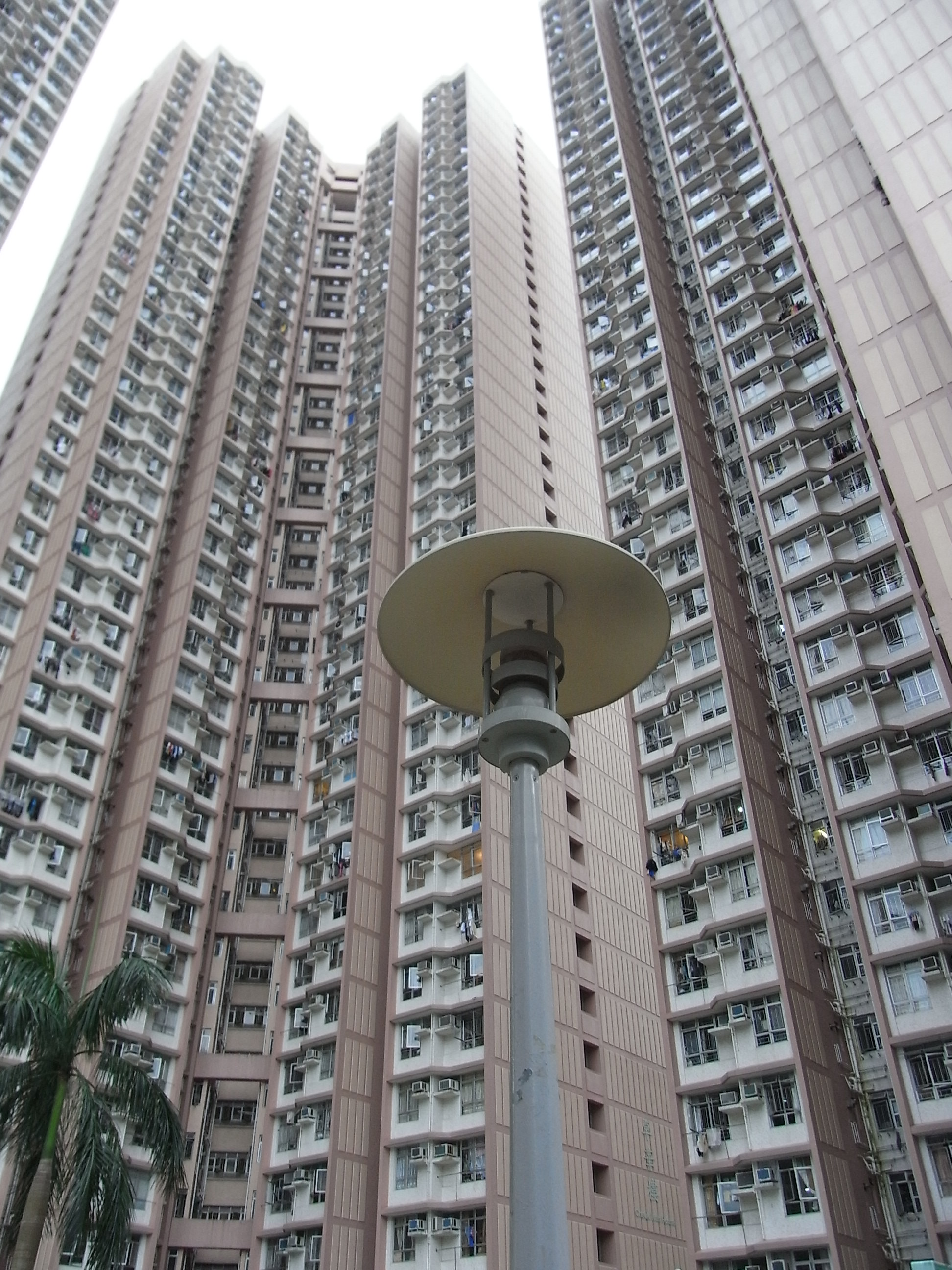
- Building facade of Hing Wah (I) Estate
- Interactive map of Hing Wah (I) Estate

General information
- Location: 11 Wan Tsui Road, Chai Wan; Hong Kong Island, Hong Kong
- Coordinates: 22.26229°N 114.23595°E
- Status: Completed
- Category: Public rental housing
- Population: 7,526 (2016)
- No. of blocks: 3
- No. of units: 2,272

Construction
- Constructed: 1971; 55 years ago (Before reconstruction); 1999; 27 years ago (After reconstruction)
- Authority: Hong Kong Housing Authority

Hing Wah (II) Estate
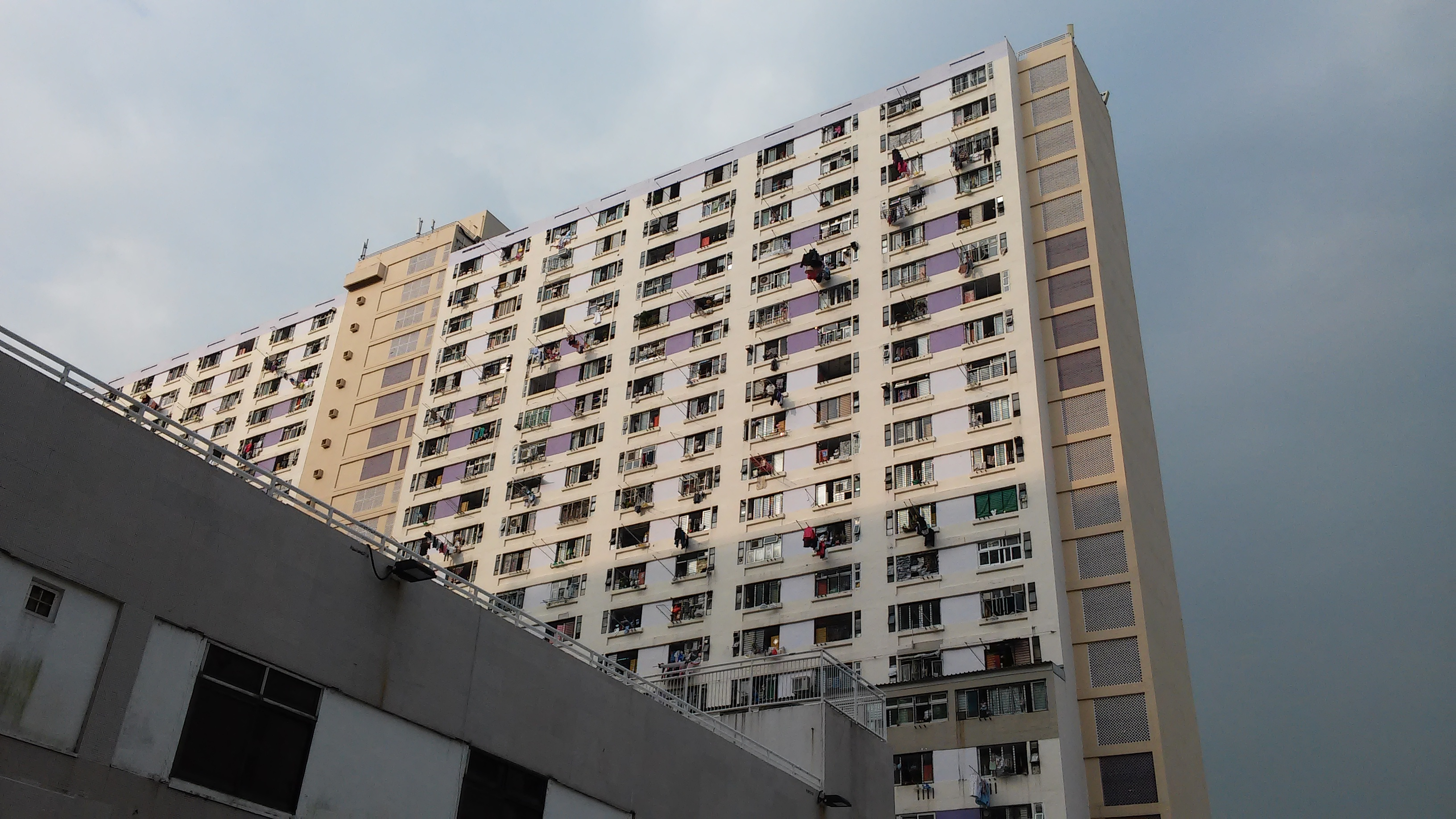
- Building facade of Hing Wah (II) Estate
- Interactive map of Hing Wah (II) Estate

General information
- Location: 18 Wan Tsui Road, Chai Wan; Hong Kong Island, Hong Kong
- Status: Completed
- Category: Public rental housing
- Population: 8,351 (2016)
- No. of blocks: 7
- No. of units: 3,579

Construction
- Constructed: 1976; 50 years ago
- Authority: Hong Kong Housing Authority

Hing Wah Estate (Chinese: 興華邨) is a public housing estate in Chai Wan, Hong Kong Island, Hong Kong, near MTR Chai Wan station. The estate comprises 10 residential buildings. The 7 "Old Slab" blocks belong to Hing Wah (II) Estate (Chinese: 興華(二)邨) completed in 1976, while the 3 "Harmony 1" buildings belong to Hing Wah (I) Estate (Chinese: 興華(一)邨) completed in 1999 and 2000.

== Background ==
Hing Wah (I) Estate was a resettlement estate which had 3 resettlement blocks completed in 1971. 7 more "Old Slab" blocks were completed in 1976, which formed Hing Wah (II) Estate. The 3 resettlement blocks in Hing Wah (I) Estate were demolished in 1995, replaced by two rental blocks in 1999 and one HOS block in 2000 respectively. However, the government decided to change an HOS block from sale to rental finally, and renamed it from "Hing Tsui Court" to "Hing Tsui House".

== Houses ==
=== Hing Wah (I) Estate ===
Name	Chinese name	Building type	Completed
Cheuk Wah House	卓華樓	Harmony 1	1999
May Wah House	美華樓	Harmony 1	1999
Hing Tsui House	興翠樓	Harmony 1	2000

=== Hing Wah (II) Estate ===
Name	Chinese name	Building type	Completed
Chin Hing House	展興樓	Old Slab	1976
Fung Hing House	豐興樓	Old Slab	1976
Lok Hing House	樂興樓	Old Slab	1976
Ning Hing House	寧興樓	Old Slab	1976
On Hing House	安興樓	Old Slab	1976
Wo Hing House	和興樓	Old Slab	1976
Yu Hing House	裕興樓	Old Slab	1976

== Demographics ==
According to the 2016 by-census, Hing Wah (I) Estate had a population of 7,526 while Hing Wah (II) Estate had a population of 8,351. Altogether the population amounts to 15,877.

== Politics ==
For the 2019 District Council election, the estate fell within two constituencies. Hing Wah (I) Estate is located in the Hing Man constituency, which is represented by Tse Miu-yee, while Hing Wah (II) Estate falls within the Fei Tsui constituency, which is represented by Joseph Lai Chi-keong.

== Covid Pandemic ==
May Wah House was put under lockdown between 3 and 4 February 2021.

== Education ==
Hing Wah Estate is in Primary One Admission (POA) School Net 16. Within the school net are multiple aided schools (operated independently but funded with government money) and two government schools: Shau Kei Wan Government Primary School and Aldrich Bay Government Primary School.

== See also ==
- Public housing estates in Chai Wan and Siu Sai Wan
