= Tai Koo Shing West (constituency) =

Hong Kong constituency

- Elected constituency for the Eastern District Council
- Boundary of Tai Koo Shing West in Eastern District
- District: Eastern
- Legislative Council constituency: Hong Kong Island East
- Population: 17,716 (2019)
- Electorate: 9,464 (2019)

Current constituency
- Created: 1994
- Number of members: One
- Member: Vacant
- Created from: Taikoo Shing

Tai Koo Shing West is one of the 35 constituencies in the Eastern District.

The constituency returns one district councillor to the Eastern District Council, with an election every four years. The seat was last held by Andrew Chiu Ka-yin of the Democratic Party.

Tai Koo Shing West constituency is loosely based on western part of Taikoo Shing with estimated population of 17,716.

== Councillors represented ==
Election	Member	Party	%
1994	Giuseppe Salaroli	Democratic Foundation→Independent	53.25
1999	Giuseppe Salaroli	Independent	N/A
2003	Giuseppe Salaroli	Independent	75.45
2007	Andrew Chiu Ka-yin→Vacant (Note: Resigned on 9 July 2021 after being arrested under national security law.)	Democratic	43.10
2011	Andrew Chiu Ka-yin→Vacant	Democratic	62.91
2015	Andrew Chiu Ka-yin→Vacant	Democratic	72.61
2019	Andrew Chiu Ka-yin→Vacant	Democratic	62.87

== Election results ==
=== 2010s ===
Eastern District Council Election, 2019: Tai Koo Shing West
Party	Candidate	Votes	%	±%
PfD (Democratic)	Andrew Chiu Ka-yin	4,390	62.87	−9.73
BPA	Kacee Ting Wong	2,593	37.13	
Majority		1,797	25.74	
Turnout		7,026	74.25	
PfD hold		Swing		

Eastern District Council Election, 2015: Tai Koo Shing West
Party	Candidate	Votes	%	±%
Democratic	Andrew Chiu Ka-yin	3,362	72.6	+9.7
Nonpartisan	Tony Ng Chi-lung	1,268	27.4	
Majority		2,049	45.2	+19.4
Turnout		4,687	53.2	
Democratic hold		Swing		

Eastern District Council Election, 2011: Tai Koo Shing West
Party	Candidate	Votes	%	±%
Democratic	Andrew Chiu Ka-yin	2,529	62.9	+19.8
NPP	William Ang Kai-teng	1,491	37.1	
Majority		1,038	25.8	+16.7
Democratic hold		Swing		

=== 2000s ===
Eastern District Council Election, 2007: Tai Koo Shing West
Party	Candidate	Votes	%	±%
Democratic	Andrew Chiu Ka-yin	1,165	43.1	
Nonpartisan	Giuseppe Salaroli	920	34.0	–41.4
DAB	Gary Chao Yuk-ming	618	22.9	
Majority		245	9.1	–41.7
Democratic gain from Nonpartisan		Swing		

Eastern District Council Election, 2003: Tai Koo Shing West
Party	Candidate	Votes	%	±%
Nonpartisan	Giuseppe Salaroli	2,145	75.4	
Nonpartisan	Elsie Pau Kwok-kit	698	24.6	
Majority		2,138	50.8	
Nonpartisan hold		Swing		

=== 1990s ===
Eastern District Council Election, 1999: Tai Koo Shing West
Party	Candidate	Votes	%	±%
Nonpartisan	Giuseppe Salaroli	uncontested		
Nonpartisan hold		Swing		

Eastern District Board Election, 1994: Tai Koo Shing West
Party	Candidate	Votes	%	±%
HKDF	Giuseppe Salaroli	1,009	52.5	
PCPHP	Cecilia Liang Sun-yin	886	46.1	
Majority		123	6.4	
HKDF win (new seat)				
