= Quarry Bay (constituency) =

Constituency of the Eastern District Council of Hong Kong

- Elected constituency for the Eastern District Council
- Boundary of Quarry Bay in Eastern District
- District: Eastern
- Legislative Council constituency: Hong Kong Island East
- Population: 13,076 (2019)
- Electorate: 6,767 (2019)

Current constituency
- Created: 1982 (1st time); 1994 (2nd time)
- Number of members: One
- Member: Vacant
- Created from: Quarry Bay South

Quarry Bay (Chinese: 鰂魚涌) is one of the 35 constituencies in the Eastern District, Hong Kong.

The constituency returns one district councillor to the Eastern District Council, with an election every four years. It was created for the first time in 1982 election and again in the 1994 election and current held by Eddie Ting Kong-ho of the Democratic Alliance for the Betterment and Progress of Hong Kong.

Quarry Bay constituency is loosely based on Quarry Bay with estimated population of 13,076.

== Councillors represented ==
=== 1982 to 1985 ===
Election	Member	Party	%
1982	Kwan Lim-ho	Reform Club	55.17
1983 by-election	Joseph Salaroli	Independent	59.66
1985	Constituency abolished		

=== 1994 to present ===
Election	Member	Party	%
1994	James Kong Tze-wing	Liberal	N/A
1999	James Kong Tze-wing	Liberal→DAB	N/A
2003	James Kong Tze-wing	DAB	N/A
2007	Eddie Ting Kong-ho	DAB	56.23
2011	Eddie Ting Kong-ho	DAB	N/A
2015	Eddie Ting Kong-ho	DAB	62.12
2019	Kelly Chan Po-king→Vacant (Note: Resigned on 9 July 2021.)	Independent democrat	55.37

== Election results ==
=== 2010s ===
Eastern District Council Election, 2019: Quarry Bay
Party	Candidate	Votes	%	±%
Democratic Coalition	Kelly Chan Po-king	2,700	55.37	
DAB	Eddie Ting Kong-ho	2,176	44.63	−17.47
Majority		524	10.74	
Turnout		4,890	72.28	
Democratic Coalition gain from DAB		Swing		

Eastern District Council Election, 2015: Quarry Bay
Party	Candidate	Votes	%	±%
DAB	Eddie Ting Kong-ho	1,656	62.1	
Nonpartisan	Ip Chee-tak	1,010	37.9	
Majority		646	24.2	
Turnout		2,666	39.7	
DAB hold		Swing		

Eastern District Council Election, 2011: Quarry Bay
Party	Candidate	Votes	%	±%
DAB	Eddie Ting Kong-ho	uncontested		
DAB hold		Swing		

=== 2000s ===
Eastern District Council Election, 2007: Quarry Bay
Party	Candidate	Votes	%	±%
DAB	Eddie Ting Kong-ho	1,313	56.2	
Civic	Wong Kin-wai	1,022	43.8	
Majority		291	12.4	
DAB hold		Swing		

Eastern District Council Election, 2003: Quarry Bay
Party	Candidate	Votes	%	±%
DAB	James Kong Tze-wing	uncontested		
DAB hold		Swing		

=== 1990s ===
Eastern District Council Election, 1999: Quarry Bay
Party	Candidate	Votes	%	±%
Liberal	James Kong Tze-wing	uncontested		
Liberal hold		Swing		

Eastern District Board Election, 1994: Quarry Bay
Party	Candidate	Votes	%	±%
Liberal	James Kong Tze-wing	uncontested		
Liberal win (new seat)				

=== 1980s ===
Quarry Bay by-election, 1983
Party	Candidate	Votes	%	±%
Nonpartisan	Joseph Salaroli	1,303	59.7	+31.6
Reform	Shum Tak-on	580	26.6	−28.6
Nonpartisan	Yeung Cho-cheung	301	13.8	
Nonpartisan gain from Reform		Swing	+30.1	

Eastern District Board Election, 1982: Quarry Bay
Party	Candidate	Votes	%	±%
Reform	Kwan Lim-ho	3,802	55.2	
Nonpartisan	Joseph Salaroli	1,939	28.1	
Nonpartisan	Lung Pui-ching	837	12.1	
Civic	Ng Tam-yiu	314	4.6	
Reform win (new seat)				
