= Giuseppe Salaroli =

Giuseppe Salaroli, MH (Chinese: 羅友聖; born 23 November 1935), also known as Joseph Salaroli, is a Hong Kong Italian priest and politician. He is a former Eastern District Council member from 1983 to 2007, last representing Tai Koo Shing West.

== Career ==
Salaroli was born in Imola, Bologna, Italy on 24 November 1935 and was ordained priest on 26 June 1960 in the diocese of Imola. He entered the Pontifical Institute for Foreign Missions (PIME) on 12 January 1965 and left for Hong Kong on 9 November 1967. He worked in Tsuen Wan and Lantao Island for several years where he was a supervisor of a school in Tai O until he obtained the reduction to the lay state in May 1974.

He met his future wife who was a Chinese teacher in Tai O. The couple married after they left Tai O for the city where he worked as a manager at the Taikoo Shing Management Limited for private residential estate Tai Koo Shing. He was good at organising events in the neighbourhood and therefore developed a substantial network with the residents. In 1982, he contested in the first District Board elections in Quarry Bay but was defeated by the Kwan Lim-ho of the Reform Club of Hong Kong. He ran again the 1983 by-election for the vacant seat left by Kwan who won a seat in the Urban Council and won a seat in the Eastern District Board with 1,303 votes, becoming one of the few non-Chinese elected representatives. In the 1991 District Board elections, he ran in Tai Koo Shing as a member of the Hong Kong Democratic Foundation and since then representing the district until 2007 when he was defeated by Andrew Chiu of the Democratic Party in Tai Koo Shing West.

For his services he was awarded Medal of Honour (M.H.) by Chief Executive Tung Chee-hwa in 2002.

== Personal life ==
Salaroli married his Chinese teacher and they have two sons together. He is a football fan who watches Italian Serie A. He also sings Italian folk songs and was a member of an Italian choir with his wife. He learnt how to play mahjong when he lived in Tai O.

Political offices
Preceded by Kwan Lim-ho	Member of the Eastern District Board; Representative for Quarry Bay; 1983–1985	Constituency abolished
New constituency	Member of the Eastern District Board; Representative for Quarry Bay North; 1985–1991	Constituency abolished
New constituency	Member of the Eastern District Board; Representative for Tai Koo Shing; 1991–1994	Constituency abolished
New constituency	Member of the Eastern District Council; Representative for Tai Koo Shing West; 1994–2007	Succeeded by Andrew Chiu
