= Fei Tsui (constituency) =

Hong Kong constituency

- Elected constituency for the Eastern District Council
- Boundary of Fei Tsui in Eastern District
- District: Eastern
- Legislative Council constituency: Hong Kong Island East
- Population: 15,268 (2019)
- Electorate: 9,476 (2019)

Current constituency
- Created: 1994
- Number of members: One
- Member: Vacant
- Created from: Chai Wan West

Fei Tsui (Chinese: 翡翠) is one of the 35 constituencies in the Eastern District. The constituency returns one district councillor to the Eastern District Council, with an election every four years. Since its creation in the 1994 election, the seat was last held by Joseph Lai Chi-keong who was the member of the Democratic Party then the Civic Party.

Fei Tsui constituency is loosely based on the Hing Wah (II) Estate, Fung Wah Estate and King Tsui Court in Chai Wan with estimated population of 15,268.

== Councillors represented ==
Election	Member	Party	%
1994	Joseph Lai Chi-keong→Vacant (Note: Resigned on 9 July 2021.)	Democratic	65.88
1999	Joseph Lai Chi-keong→Vacant	Democratic	53.08
2003	Joseph Lai Chi-keong→Vacant	Democratic	64.14
2007	Joseph Lai Chi-keong→Vacant	Democratic→Independent→Civic	59.37
2011	Joseph Lai Chi-keong→Vacant	Civic	64.55
2015	Joseph Lai Chi-keong→Vacant	Civic	54.77
2019	Joseph Lai Chi-keong→Vacant	Civic	56.70

== Election results ==
=== 2010s ===
Eastern District Council Election, 2019: Fei Tsui
Party	Candidate	Votes	%	±%
Civic (PfD)	Joseph Lai Chi-keong	3,591	56.70	+0.60
DAB (FTU)	Joseph Chan Hoi-wing	2,742	43.30	
Majority		849	14.40	
Turnout		6,359	67.13	
Civic hold		Swing		

Eastern District Council Election, 2015: Fei Tsui
Party	Candidate	Votes	%	±%
Civic	Joseph Lai Chi-keong	2,314	56.1	–12.5
Independent	Lily Li Lee	1,797	42.5	
Ind. democrat	Lui Chi-man	114	2.7	
Majority		517	7.6	
Turnout		4,247	46.6	
Civic hold		Swing		

Eastern District Council Election, 2011: Fei Tsui
Party	Candidate	Votes	%	±%
Civic	Joseph Lai Chi-keong	2,309	64.6	+5.2
DAB	Chao Shing-kie	1,268	35.4	
Civic hold		Swing		

=== 2000s ===
Eastern District Council Election, 2007: Fei Tsui
Party	Candidate	Votes	%	±%
Democratic	Joseph Lai Chi-keong	1,650	59.4	−4.7
Independent	Ma Tak-sing	1,129	40.6	+4.7
Democratic hold		Swing		

Eastern District Council Election, 2003: Fei Tsui
Party	Candidate	Votes	%	±%
Democratic	Joseph Lai Chi-keong	1,932	64.1	+11.3
DAB	Ma Tak-sing	1,080	35.9	−10.7
Democratic hold		Swing		

=== 1990s ===
Eastern District Council Election, 1999: Fei Tsui
Party	Candidate	Votes	%	±%
Democratic	Joseph Lai Chi-keong	1,636	52.8	
DAB	Ma Tak-sing	1,446	46.6	
Democratic hold		Swing		

Eastern District Board Election, 1994: Fei Tsui
Party	Candidate	Votes	%	±%
Democratic	Joseph Lai Chi-keong	1,666	65.3	
DAB	Tang Shek-ching	863	33.8	
Democratic win (new seat)				
