= Horace Cheung =

Hong Kong solicitor and politician

The Honourable Horace Cheung JP
- 張國鈞
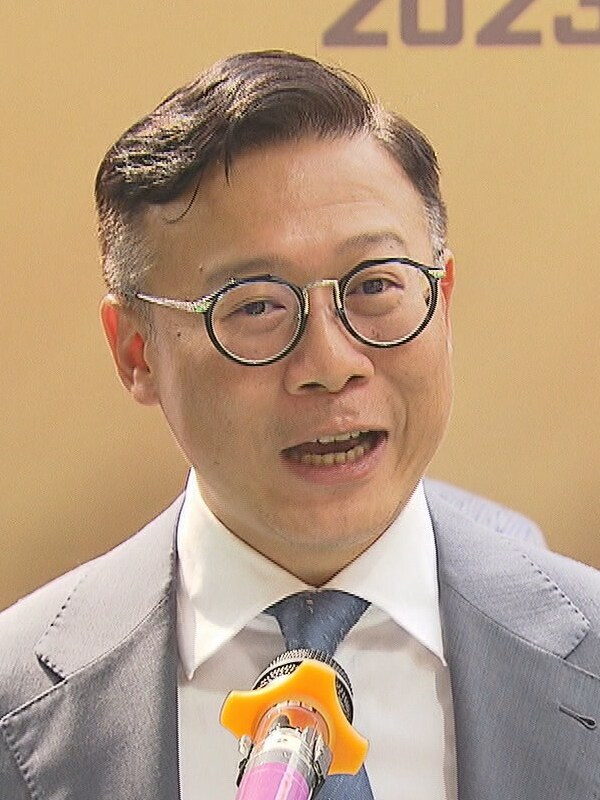
- Cheung in 2023

Deputy Secretary for Justice
- Incumbent
- Assumed office 1 July 2022
- Preceded by: Position established

Non-Official Member of the Executive Council
- In office 1 July 2017 – 30 June 2022
- Appointed by: Carrie Lam

Vice-Chairman of the Democratic Alliance for the Betterment and Progress of Hong Kong
- In office 24 April 2011 – 18 June 2022
- Chairman: Tam Yiu-chung; Starry Lee
- Preceded by: Carson Wen

Member of the Legislative Council
- In office 1 January 2022 – 18 June 2022
- Preceded by: New constituency
- Succeeded by: Chan Wing-kwong
- Constituency: Election Committee
- In office 1 October 2016 – 31 December 2021
- Preceded by: Christopher Chung
- Succeeded by: Constituency abolished
- Constituency: Hong Kong Island

Member of the Central and Western District Council
- In office 1 January 2012 – 31 December 2019
- Preceded by: Chan Tak-chor
- Succeeded by: Pang Ka-ho
- Constituency: Sai Wan

Personal details
- Born: 30 June 1974 (age 52) Hong Kong
- Party: Democratic Alliance for the Betterment and Progress of Hong Kong (DAB) (until 2022)
- Education: City University of Hong Kong
- Occupation: Solicitor; Politician

Horace Cheung
- Traditional Chinese: 張國鈞
- Simplified Chinese: 张国钧
Transcriptions
Standard Mandarin
- Hanyu Pinyin: Zhāng Guójūn
Yue: Cantonese
- Yale Romanization: Jēung Gwok kwān
- Jyutping: Zoeng^{1} Gwok^{3} kwan^{1}

Horace Cheung Kwok-kwan, JP (Chinese: 張國鈞, born 30 June 1974) is a Hong Kong solicitor and politician and the former vice-chairman of the Democratic Alliance for the Betterment and Progress of Hong Kong (DAB), the largest pro-Beijing party in Hong Kong. He was elected to Legislative Council of Hong Kong in 2016 through the Hong Kong Island constituency, and re-elected in 2021 through the Election Committee constituency. He is the current Deputy Secretary for Justice.

== Career ==
Cheung graduated from the City University of Hong Kong with a bachelor's degree in law and is a partner of Cheung & Yeung solicitors. He joined the DAB in 2000 and worked closely with the then party chairman Ma Lik as the vice-chairman of the Wan Chai branch, party of Ma's Hong Kong Island constituency. He took in charge of the party's 800-member youth wing when it was created in 2004. With his young age with professional background, Cheung is a high-flier in the party. In 2011, he became the vice-chairman of the DAB.

He contested in the 2003 District Council elections in Stubbs Road but was defeated. In the 2004 Legislative Council elections, he was placed in the DAB list behind Ma Lik and Choy So-yuk and was not elected. In 2008 Legislative Council elections, he was placed the fourth behind Tsang Yok-sing, Choy So-yuk and Christopher Chung and did not get elected. In 2011 District Council elections, he won a seat in Sai Wan constituency in the Central and Western District Council by 24 votes against a Democratic Party candidate. He was elected to the Election Committee in the Election Committee sub-sector elections through the Urban District Councils Sub-sector in 2011. He lost his seat in the 2019 District Council elections.

He has been appointed to various public positions including membership on the Administrative Appeals Board, Buildings Appeal Tribunal Panel, Central Policy Unit, Estate Agents Authority, Long Term housing Strategy Steering Committee, Standing Committee on Disciplined Services Salaries and Conditions of Service and Steering Committee on the regulation of the sale of first-hand residential properties by legislation. He is member of the Disciplinary and Investigate Panels of the Hong Kong Institute of Certified Public Accountants (HKICPA).

He was elected to Legislative Council of Hong Kong in 2016 through the Hong Kong Island constituency.

In April 2021, Cheung criticized the Hong Kong Bar Association, and said that the group had commented too often on political issues.

On 18 June 2022, he resigned from the Legislative Council and the DAB to become the Deputy Secretary for Justice.

In December 2022, Cheung said that asking the NPCSC to interpret Hong Kong's national security law is the "healthiest way" for the legal system to develop, after the government appealed to Beijing to block Jimmy Lai from using UK lawyer Tim Owen.

In February 2023, after a trip to the Middle East, Cheung said that no government officials or business leaders asked him about the national security law, and said that those in the Middle East "are not easily swayed by inaccurate or incorrect information."

== Personal life ==
Cheung is a solicitor and is married with two daughters, and he holds a master's degree in law from the City University of Hong Kong. As of 2018, he is a PhD student in Public Administration at the University of Hong Kong.

In September 2022, Cheung tested positive for COVID-19.

Party political offices
New creation	Chairman of Young Democratic Alliance for the Betterment and Progress of Hong Kong; 2004–2009	Succeeded by Holden Chow
Preceded by Carson Wen	Vice-Chairman of Democratic Alliance for the Betterment and Progress of Hong Kong; 2011–2022	Succeeded by TBD
Political offices
Preceded by Chan Tak-chor	Member of Central and Western District Council; Representative for Sai Wan; 2012–2019	Succeeded by Pang Ka-ho
Legislative Council of Hong Kong
Preceded by Christopher Chung	Member of Legislative Council; Representative for Hong Kong Island; 2016–2021	Constituency abolished
New constituency	Member of Legislative Council; Representative for Election Committee; 2022–2022	Succeeded by Chan Wing-kwong
Order of precedence
Preceded by Michael Wong Wai-lun; Deputy Financial Secretary	Hong Kong order of precedence Deputy Secretary for Justice	Succeeded by Arthur Li; Member of the Executive Council
