= Sai Wan (constituency) =

Former Hong Kong constituency

Coordinates: 22.2877°N 114.1365°E

- Former Elected constituency for the Central & Western District Council
- Boundary of Sai Wan in Central & Western District
- District: Central & Western
- Legislative Council constituency: Hong Kong Island West
- Population: 12,985 (2019)
- Electorate: 7,986 (2019)

Former constituency
- Created: 1994
- Abolished: 2023
- Number of members: One
- Created from: Kennedy Town East; Kennedy Town West & Mount Davis

Sai Wan (Chinese: 西環) was one of the 15 constituencies in the Central and Western District. It returned one member of the district council until it was abolished the 2023 electoral reforms.

Sai Wan constituency was loosely based on the area around eastern part of the Kennedy Town with estimated population of 12,985.

== Councillors represented ==
Election	Member	Party	%
1994	Chan Tak-chor	Liberal	54.45
1999	Chan Tak-chor	Liberal	N/A
2003	Chan Tak-chor	Liberal	N/A
2007	Chan Tak-chor	Liberal→Independent	N/A
2011	Horace Cheung Kwok-kwan	DAB	50.37
2015	Horace Cheung Kwok-kwan	DAB	51.45
2019	Pang Ka-ho	VSA→Independent	56.48

== Election results ==
=== 2010s ===
Central & Western District Council Election, 2019: Sai Wan
Party	Candidate	Votes	%	±%
Ind. democrat	Pang Ka-ho	3,289	56.48	
DAB	Cheung Kwok-kwan	2,494	42.83	−8.57
Nonpartisan	Shirley Wong Mi-hing	40	0.69	
Majority		795	13.65	
Turnout		5,845	73.19	
Ind. democrat gain from DAB		Swing		

Central & Western District Council Election, 2015: Sai Wan
Party	Candidate	Votes	%	±%
DAB	Cheung Kwok-kwan	2,011	51.4	+1.0
Democratic	Winfield Chong Wing-fai	1,898	48.6	–1.0
Majority		113	1.8	+1.0
Turnout		3,949	52.6	
DAB hold		Swing	+1.0	

Central & Western District Council Election, 2011: Sai Wan
Party	Candidate	Votes	%	±%
DAB	Cheung Kwok-kwan	1,655	50.4	N/A
Democratic	Winfield Chong Wing-fai	1,631	49.6	N/A
Majority		24	0.8	N/A
DAB gain from Independent		Swing		

=== 2000s ===
Central & Western District Council Election, 2007: Sai Wan
Party	Candidate	Votes	%	±%
Liberal	Chan Tak-chor	Unopposed		
Liberal hold		Swing	N/A	

Central & Western District Council Election, 2003: Sai Wan
Party	Candidate	Votes	%	±%
Liberal	Chan Tak-chor	Unopposed		
Liberal hold		Swing	N/A	

=== 1990s ===
Central & Western District Council Election, 1999: Sai Wan
Party	Candidate	Votes	%	±%
Independent	Chan Tak-chor	Unopposed		
Independent hold		Swing	N/A	

Central & Western District Board Election, 1994: Sai Wan
Party	Candidate	Votes	%	±%
Liberal	Chan Tak-chor	1,681	54.2	
Democratic	Chan Kwok-leung	1,406	45.4	
Majority		275	8.8	
Liberal win (new seat)				
