= Victoria Park (constituency) =

Former Hong Kong constituency

- Former Elected constituency for the Wan Chai District Council
- Boundary of Victoria Park in Wan Chai District
- District: Eastern (1994–2015); Wan Chai (2015–present)
- Legislative Council constituency: Hong Kong Island East
- Population: 13,412 (2019)
- Electorate: 6,784 (2019)

Former constituency
- Created: 1994
- Abolished: 2023
- Number of members: One

Victoria Park, formerly called Causeway Bay North, was one of the 13 constituencies of the Wan Chai District Council of Hong Kong. It returned one member of the district council until it was abolished the 2023 electoral reforms. The constituency boundary was loosely based on the residential area east of the Victoria Park with estimated population of 13,412. Prior to the District Council election in 2015, it was a constituency of the Eastern District Council.

== Councillors represented ==
=== 1982 to 1988 ===
Election	Member	Party
1982	Wong Tin-cho	Nonpartisan
1985	Lai Siu-lam	Reform Club

=== 1988 to 1991 ===
Election	Member	Party	Member	Party
1988	Man Sai-cheong	HKAS	Jennifer Chow Kit-bing	Nonpartisan

=== 1991 to present ===
Election	Member	Party	%
1991	Jennifer Chow Kit-bing	Independent→Liberal	70.92
1994	Jennifer Chow Kit-bing	Liberal→Independent	78.13
1999	Jennifer Chow Kit-bing	Independent	69.60
2003	Jennifer Chow Kit-bing	Independent	72.51
2007	Jennifer Chow Kit-bing	Independent	N/A
2011	Jennifer Chow Kit-bing	Independent→DAB	N/A
2015	Jennifer Chow Kit-bing	DAB	N/A
2019	Li Wing-choi→Vacant (Note: Resigned on 8 July 2021.)	VSA→Independent	54.07

== Election results ==
=== 2010s ===
Wan Chai District Council Election, 2019: Victoria Park
Party	Candidate	Votes	%	±%
PfD (VSA)	Li Wing-choi	2,502	54.07	
DAB	Jennifer Chow Kit-bing	2,125	45.93	
Majority		377	8.14	
Turnout		4,639	68.39	
PfD gain from DAB		Swing		

Wan Chai District Council Election, 2015: Victoria Park
Party	Candidate	Votes	%	±%
DAB	Jennifer Chow Kit-bing	Uncontested		
DAB hold		Swing		

Eastern District Council Election, 2011: Victoria Park
Party	Candidate	Votes	%	±%
Nonpartisan	Jennifer Chow Kit-bing	Uncontested		
Nonpartisan hold		Swing		

=== 2000s ===
Eastern District Council Election, 2007: Victoria Park
Party	Candidate	Votes	%	±%
Nonpartisan	Jennifer Chow Kit-bing	Uncontested		
Nonpartisan hold		Swing		

Eastern District Council Election, 2003: Victoria Park
Party	Candidate	Votes	%	±%
Nonpartisan	Jennifer Chow Kit-bing	1,788	72.5	+3.5
DAB	Wong Chi-chung	678	27.5	
Nonpartisan hold		Swing		

=== 1990s ===
Eastern District Council Election, 1999: Victoria Park
Party	Candidate	Votes	%	±%
Nonpartisan	Jennifer Chow Kit-bing	1,383	69.0	−7.5
Nonpartisan	Kwan Kwok-kit	604	30.2	
Nonpartisan hold		Swing		

Eastern District Board Election, 1994: Victoria Park
Party	Candidate	Votes	%	±%
Liberal	Jennifer Chow Kit-bing	1,429	76.5	+5.6
DAB	Yuen Chun-chuen	400	21.4	
Liberal win (new seat)				

Eastern District Board Election, 1991: Causeway Way North
Party	Candidate	Votes	%	±%
Independent	Jennifer Chow Kit-bing	883	70.9	
Independent	Lai Siu-lam	362	21.4	
Independent hold		Swing		

=== 1980s ===
Eastern District Board Election, 1988: Causeway Way North
Party	Candidate	Votes	%	±%
HKAS	Man Sai-cheong	2,061	51.6	
Independent	Jennifer Chow Kit-bing	927	23.2	
Reform	Lai Siu-lam	671	16.8	−30.1
Independent	Ho Yu-chi	334	8.4	
HKAS gain from Reform		Swing		
Independent win (new seat)				

Eastern District Board Election, 1985: Causeway Way North
Party	Candidate	Votes	%	±%
Reform	Lai Siu-lam	1,256	46.9	+16.2
Independent	Wong Tin-cho	1,170	43.7	+2.7
Independent	Poon Kam-tim	253	9.4	−5.3
Reform gain from Independent		Swing		

Eastern District Board Election, 1982: Causeway Way North
Party	Candidate	Votes	%	±%
Independent	Wong Tin-cho	810	41.0	
Reform	Lai Siu-lam	607	30.7	
Independent	Poon Kam-tim	290	14.7	
Independent	So Siu-sun	270	13.7	
Independent win (new seat)				
