= 1999 Eastern District Council election =

Hong Kong local election

- 28 November 1999

37 (of the 46) seats to Eastern District Council 24 seats needed for a majority
- Turnout: 32.9%
	First party	Second party	Third party
Party	DAB	Democratic	Liberal
Last election	9 seats, 23.6%	4 seats, 19.2%	3 seats, 11.6%
Seats before	10	4	2
Seats won	13	6	2
Seat change	▲3	▲2	Steady
Popular vote	27,323	20,196	1,674
Percentage	35.4%	26.2%	2.2%
Swing	▲11.8%	▲7.0%	▼9.4%
	Fourth party	Fifth party	Sixth party
Party	Citizens	HKDF	HKPA
Last election	New party	2 seats, 3.8%	0 seat, 0.4%
Seats before	1	1	0
Seats won	1	1	1
Seat change	Steady	Steady	▲1
Popular vote	2,072	1,392	1,275
Percentage	2.7%	1.8%	1.6%
Swing	N/A	▼2.0%	▲1.2%
	Seventh party
Party	Frontier
Last election	New party
Seats before	1
Seats won	1
Seat change	Steady
Popular vote	1,173
Percentage	1.5%
Swing	N/A
- Colours on map indicate winning party for each constituency.

The 1999 Eastern District Council election was held on 28 November 1999 to elect all 37 elected members to the 46-member District Council.

== Overall election results ==
Before election:

↓
8	1	25
Pro-dem	I.	Pro-Beijing

Change in composition:

↓
10	1	26
Pro-dem	I.	Pro-Beijing

Eastern District Council election result 1999
Party	Seats	Gains	Losses	Net gain/loss	Seats %	Votes %	Votes	+/−
DAB	13	3	0	+3	35.1	35.4	27,323	+11.8
Independent	12	2	5	−3	32.4	28.2	21,777	+0.2
Democratic	6	3	1	+2	16.2	26.2	20,196	+7.0
Liberal	2	0	0	0	5.4	2.2	1,674	−9.4
Citizens	1	0	0	0	2.8	2.7	2,072	
HKDF	1	0	0	0	2.8	1.8	1,392	−2.0
HKPA	1	1	0	+1	2.8	1.6	1,275	+1.2
Frontier	1	0	0	0	2.8	1.5	1,173	
