= Victoria Social Association =

Victoria Social Association 維多利亞社區協會
- Chairman: Chow Sai-kit
- Founded: April 2016
- Dissolved: 30 June 2020
- Ideology: Liberalism (HK); Localism (HK)
- Regional affiliation: Pro-democracy camp
- Colours: Purple

Victoria Social Association
- Traditional Chinese: 維多利亞社區協會
- Simplified Chinese: 维多利亚社区协会
Transcriptions
Standard Mandarin
- Hanyu Pinyin: Wéiduōlìyà Shèqū Xiéhuì
Yue: Cantonese
- Yale Romanization: wàih dō leih a3 séh kēui hip wuih
- Jyutping: Wai4 do1 lei6 aa3 se5 keoi1 hip3 wui6

The Victoria Social Association (HKVSA) was a local political group based in Central and Western District and Wan Chai District, the former area of the Victoria City founded in April 2016. The association won one seat in Wan Chai in 2019 District Council election.

== History ==
The association was founded in April 2016 by Chow Sai-kit, who was a former member of the pro-independence Youngspiration. Chow ran in the 2015 District Council election in Kennedy Town & Mount Davis but failed to win a seat. In the 2019 District Council election, four members of the association ran in the election, while only two of them ran under the banner of VSA. Chow himself ran as a substitute candidate for independent Fergus Leung Fong-wai in case Leung was disqualified from running in Kwun Lung. While Fung was elected, Li Wing-choi who represented the association won a seat in Victoria Park, as well as two members who ran as independents, Pang Ka-ho and Ho Chi-wang won in Sai Wan and Water Street respectively.

Beijing mouthpiece Wen Wei Po accused the VSA of being pro-independence, citing chairman Chow Sai-kit former membership of Youngspiration and Li Wing-choi's opposition to the proposed National Anthem Bill. The association refuted by claiming that the news report was fabricated and reserved the right to sue.

== Election results ==
=== District Council elections ===
Election	Number of popular votes	% of popular votes	Total elected seats	+/−
2019	2,640	0.09	1 / 452	1 ▲
