= Andrew Chiu =

Hong Kong politician (born 1985)

- 趙家賢
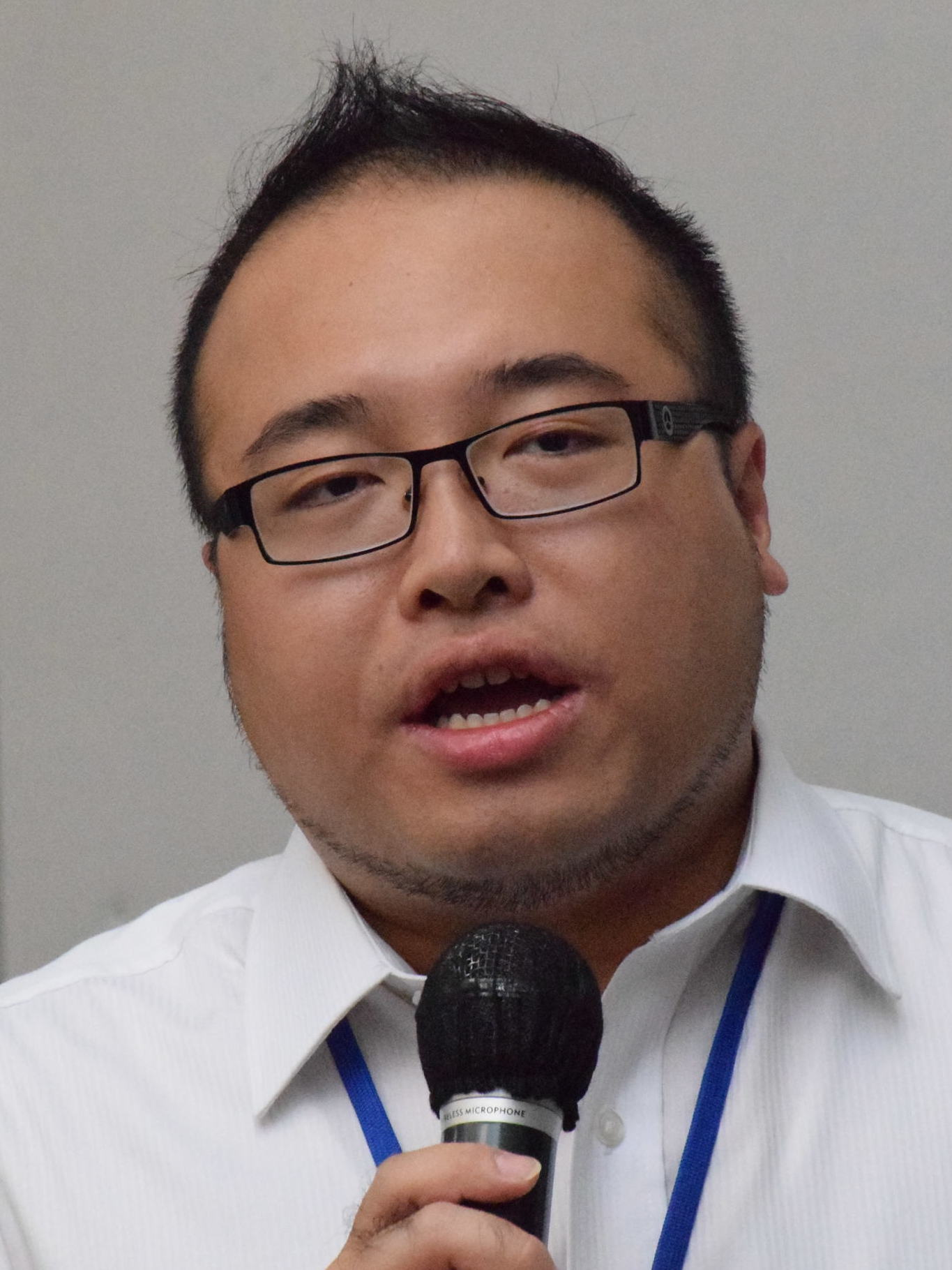

Convenor of Power for Democracy
- In office November 2014 – 27 February 2021
- Preceded by: Joseph Cheng

Member of the Eastern District Council
- In office 1 January 2008 – 9 July 2021
- Preceded by: Giuseppe Salaroli
- Constituency: Tai Koo Shing West

Personal details
- Born: 17 July 1985 (age 41) British Hong Kong
- Party: Democratic Party
- Other political affiliations: Professional Commons; Power for Democracy (2002–2021)
- Education: Open University of Hong Kong; Hong Kong Baptist University; SABI University

Andrew Chiu
- Traditional Chinese: 趙家賢
Transcriptions
Yue: Cantonese
- Yale Romanization: Jiuh gāa yìhn
- Jyutping: Ziu6 gaa1 ji4

Andrew Chiu Ka-yin (Chinese: 趙家賢; born 17 July 1985) is a Hong Kong politician, democracy activist, experienced accredited mediator and arbitrator. He is a former member of the Democratic Party, former strategy committee member of the Professional Commons, former chairperson of Hong Kong Society of Accredited Mediators and former convenor of Power for Democracy, as well as a former elected member of the Eastern District Council for Tai Koo Shing West from 2008. He was jailed for subversion in May 2024 over his participation in the 2020 pro-democracy primaries, and granted early release in October 2025.

== Biography ==
He was born and educated in Hong Kong, graduated with a Bachelor of Social Sciences from the Open University of Hong Kong and a master's degree in Public Administration from Hong Kong Baptist University. In 2017, he was conferred an honorary doctorate degree in Public Administration from SABI University, an online private higher education institute registered under French Government's 'Ministry of Higher Education, Research and Innovation', in recognition of his contributions and commitments to the public sector over a decade, including the fact that Chiu was the youngest elected representative in the 2007 Hong Kong local elections (22 years old).

Chiu joined the Democratic Party in 2004 and was first elected to the Eastern District Council in Tai Koo Shing West in 2007 and was re-elected in 2011 and 2015. He was also a central committee member of the Democratic Party from 2010 to 2014. He was on the Democratic Party ticket in the 2012 Legislative Council election in District Council (Second). The ticket received 316,468 votes and successfully secured a seat for James To.

In 2014, he succeeded Joseph Cheng Yu-shek to become the convenor of the Power for Democracy, a mediating platform for electoral coordination between the pro-democratic parties. During his tenure as convenor, the group coordinated several mock polls and primaries for the pro-democrats, including the 2015 District Council election and the primaries for March 2018 Legislative Council by-elections.

Chiu was elected vice-president of the Eastern District Council in 2020.

On 6 January 2021, Chiu was among 55 members of the pro-democratic camp who were arrested under the national security law, specifically its provision regarding subversion. The group stood accused of organising and participating in unofficial primary elections held by the camp in July 2020. Like most of the group, Chiu was released on bail on 7 January. After he was charged, Chiu decided to resign as a member and Vice-Chairman of Eastern District Council, effective on 9 July 2021. Together with 44 of his co-defendants, he was jailed in May 2024; he received a seven-year sentence. During the trial he acted as a witness for the prosecution. In October 2025, he was the first to be granted early release, for good conduct in jail. In a December 2025 interview, he expressed remorse for his earlier activism and said he had no intent to engage in politics in the foreseeable future.

=== Tai Koo Shing attack ===
On 3 November 2019, during a protest at Cityplaza, Tai Koo Shing, Chiu was attacked by a pro-Beijing, Mandarin-speaking, knife-wielding man, when he tried to stop a fight after the attacker assaulted several people. His left ear was partially bitten off by the attacker. Doctors made an unsuccessful attempt to reattach the ear. The perpetrator was jailed for 14 years and six months in April 2022 for this act and for slashing another man in the stomach, with the presiding judge calling the attack on Chiu "barbaric".

Political offices
Preceded by Giuseppe Salaroli	Member of Eastern District Council; Representative for Tai Koo Shing West; 2008–2021	Vacant
Preceded by Chiu Chi-keung	Vice Chairman of Eastern District Council; 2020–2021	Vacant
Party political offices
Preceded by Joseph Cheng	Convenor of Power for Democracy; 2014–2021	Party dissolved
