= 2003 Eastern District Council election =

Hong Kong local election

- 23 November 2003

37 (of the 46) seats to Eastern District Council 24 seats needed for a majority
- Turnout: 40.1%
	First party	Second party
Party	DAB	Democratic
Last election	13 seats, 35.4%	6 seats, 26.2%
Seats before	13	6
Seats won	12	6
Seat change	▼1	Steady
Popular vote	24,317	17,061
Percentage	27.3%	19.2%
Swing	▼8.1%	▼7.0%
	Third party	Fourth party
Party	Liberal	HKPA
Last election	2 seats, 2.2%	1 seat, 1.7%
Seats before	2	1
Seats won	1	1
Seat change	▼1	Steady
Popular vote	2,400	Uncontested
Percentage	2.7%	N/A
Swing	▲0.5%	N/A
- Colours on map indicate winning party for each constituency.

The 2003 Eastern District Council election was held on 23 November 2003 to elect all 36 elected members to the 45-member District Council.

== Overall election results ==
Before election:

↓
10	1	26
Pro-democracy	I.	Pro-Beijing

Change in composition:

↓
12	1	24
Pro-democracy	I.	Pro-Beijing

Eastern District Council election result 2003
Party	Seats	Gains	Losses	Net gain/loss	Seats %	Votes %	Votes	+/−
Independent	17	2	0	+2	47.2	34.8	44,135	
DAB	12	0	1	−1	33.3	27.3	24,317	−8.1
Democratic	6	0	0	0	16.7	19.2	17,061	−7.0
Liberal	1	0	1	−1	2.8	2.7	2,400	+0.5
April Fifth Action	0	0	0	0	0	1.3	1,149	
HKPA	1	0	0	0	2.8	0	0	
