= Yue Wan (constituency) =

Hong Kong constituency

- Elected constituency for the Eastern District Council
- Boundary of Yue Wan in Eastern District
- District: Eastern
- Legislative Council constituency: Hong Kong Island East
- Population: 14,926 (2019)
- Electorate: 9,161 (2019)

Current constituency
- Created: 1994
- Number of members: One
- Member: Vacant
- Created from: Chai Wan North; Chai Wan South

Yue Wan (Chinese: 漁灣) is one of the 35 constituencies in the Eastern District, Hong Kong.

The constituency returns one district councillor to the Eastern District Council, with an election every four years. It is currently held by independent Chui Chi-kin.

Yue Wan constituency is loosely based on the Yue Wan Estate, Chai Wan Estate and Lok Hin Terrace in Chai Wan with estimated population of 14,926.

== Councillors represented ==
| Election | Member | Party |
|---|---|---|
| 1994 | Christopher Chung Shu-kun | DAB |
| 1999 | Christopher Chung Shu-kun | DAB |
| 2003 | Christopher Chung Shu-kun | DAB |
| 2007 | Christopher Chung Shu-kun | DAB |
| 2011 | Christopher Chung Shu-kun | DAB |
| 2015 | Chui Chi-kin | Independent |
| 2019 | Chui Chi-kin→Vacant (Note: Resigned on 21 May 2021 after being arrested under national security law.) | Independent |

== Election results ==
=== 2010s ===
Eastern District Council Election, 2019: Yue Wan
| Party | Candidate | Votes | % | ±% |
|---|---|---|---|---|
| Independent | Chui Chi-kin | 3,814 | 59.46 | +7.36 |
| DAB (FTU) | Lau Kin | 2,374 | 37.01 | −10.89 |
| Independent | Tsai Chui-wan | 196 | 3.06 | |
| Nonpartisan | Woo Kin-nam | 30 | 0.47 | |
| Majority | | 1,440 | 22.45 | |
| Turnout | | 6,441 | 70.32 | |
| Independent hold | | Swing | +9.13 | |

Eastern District Council Election, 2015: Yue Wan
| Party | Candidate | Votes | % | ±% |
|---|---|---|---|---|
| Independent | Chui Chi-kin | 2,026 | 52.1 | |
| DAB | Christopher Chung Shu-kun | 1,863 | 47.9 | |
| Majority | | 163 | 4.2 | |
| Turnout | | 3,902 | 46.8 | |
| Independent gain from DAB | | Swing | | |

Eastern District Council Election, 2011: Yue Wan
| Party | Candidate | Votes | % | ±% |
|---|---|---|---|---|
| DAB | Christopher Chung Shu-kun | Uncontested | | |
| DAB hold | | Swing | | |

=== 2000s ===
Eastern District Council Election, 2007: Yue Wan
| Party | Candidate | Votes | % | ±% |
|---|---|---|---|---|
| DAB | Christopher Chung Shu-kun | 1,922 | 72.8 | |
| LSD | Chan Yu-nam | 719 | 27.2 | |
| DAB hold | | Swing | | |

Eastern District Council Election, 2003: Yue Wan
| Party | Candidate | Votes | % | ±% |
|---|---|---|---|---|
| DAB | Christopher Chung Shu-kun | Uncontested | | |
| DAB hold | | Swing | | |

=== 1990s ===
Eastern District Council Election, 1999: Yue Wan
| Party | Candidate | Votes | % | ±% |
|---|---|---|---|---|
| DAB | Christopher Chung Shu-kun | 2,360 | 65.2 | −6.5 |
| Democratic | Tang Chui-chung | 1,253 | 34.6 | +7.4 |
| DAB hold | | Swing | | |

Eastern District Board Election, 1994: Yue Wan
| Party | Candidate | Votes | % | ±% |
|---|---|---|---|---|
| DAB | Christopher Chung Shu-kun | 1,736 | 71.7 | |
| Democratic | Koo Nam | 666 | 27.2 | |
| DAB win (new seat) | | | | |
