= Shaukeiwan (constituency) =

Hong Kong constituency

- Elected constituency for the Eastern District Council
- Boundary of Shaukeiwan in Eastern District
- District: Eastern
- Legislative Council constituency: Hong Kong Island East
- Population: 14,076 (2019)
- Electorate: 6,952 (2019)

Current constituency
- Created: 1988
- Number of members: One
- Member: Leung Wing-sze (Nonpartisan)

Shaukeiwan is one of the 35 constituencies in the Eastern District, Hong Kong. The constituency returns one district councillor to the Eastern District Council, with an election every four years. It was created in the 1988 District Board election.

Shaukeiwan constituency is loosely based on central area of Shau Kei Wan with estimated population of 14,076.

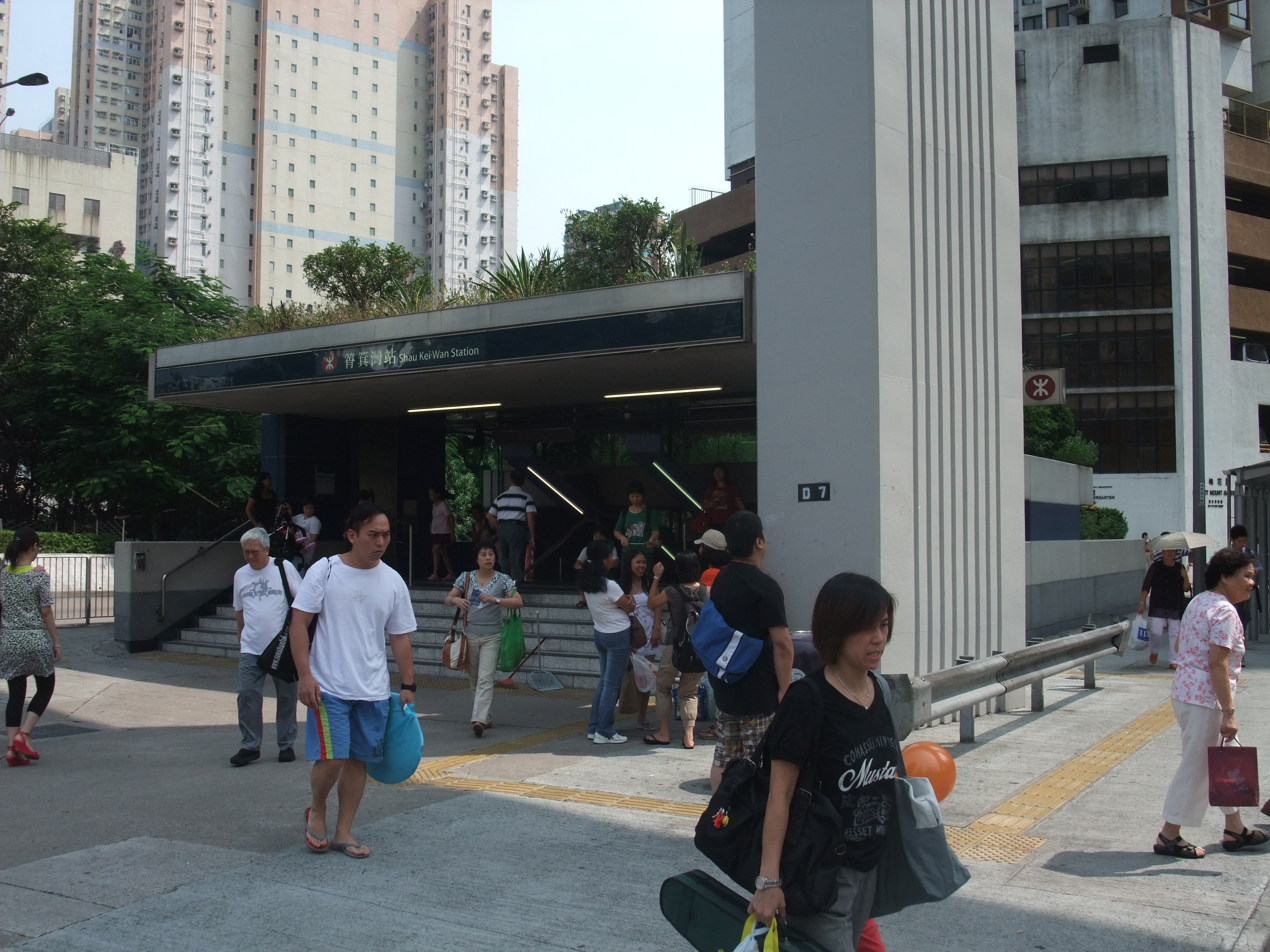
Exit A3 of Shau Kei Wan station

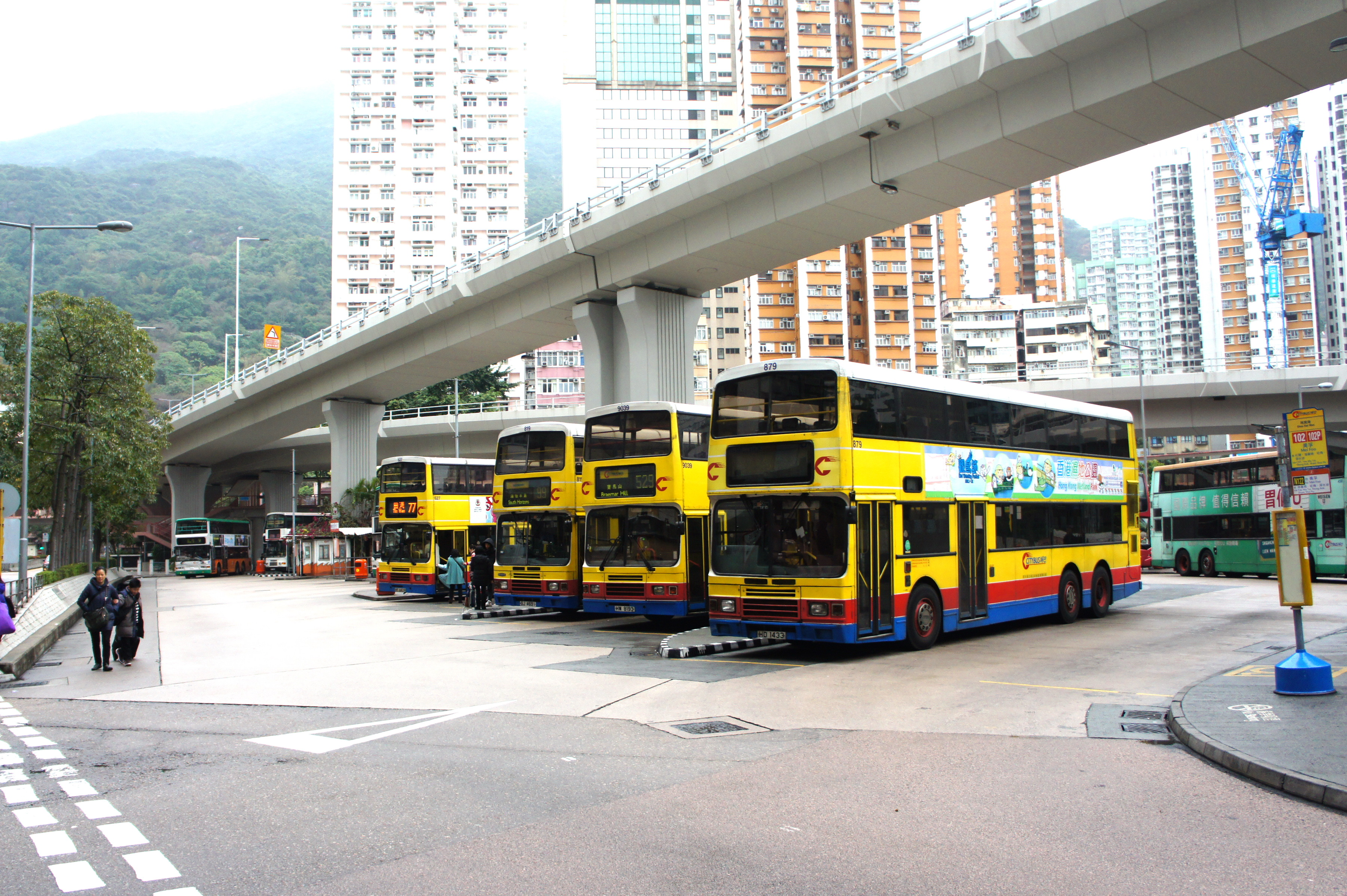
Shau Kei Wan bus terminus, next to exit A3 of the Shau Kei Wan station

== Councillors represented ==
Election	Member	Party	%
1988	Chan Ying-lun	Independent→Democratic Foundation	63.16
1991	Hui Ka-ho	Independent	42.44
1994	Lo Tip-chun	DAB	51.40
1999	Lo Tip-chun	DAB	N/A
2003	Lo Tip-chun	DAB	N/A
2007	Lo Tip-chun	DAB	64.05
2011	Lo Tip-chun	DAB	53.23
2015	Lam Sum-lin	DAB	48.46
2019	Leung Wing-sze	Nonpartisan	62.82

== Election results ==
=== 2010s ===
Eastern District Council Election, 2019: Shaukeiwan
Party	Candidate	Votes	%	±%
Nonpartisan	Leung Wing-sze	3,215	62.82	
DAB	Lam Sum-lin	1,903	37.18	−11.28
Majority		1,312	25.64	
Turnout		5,143	73.98	
Nonpartisan gain from DAB		Swing		

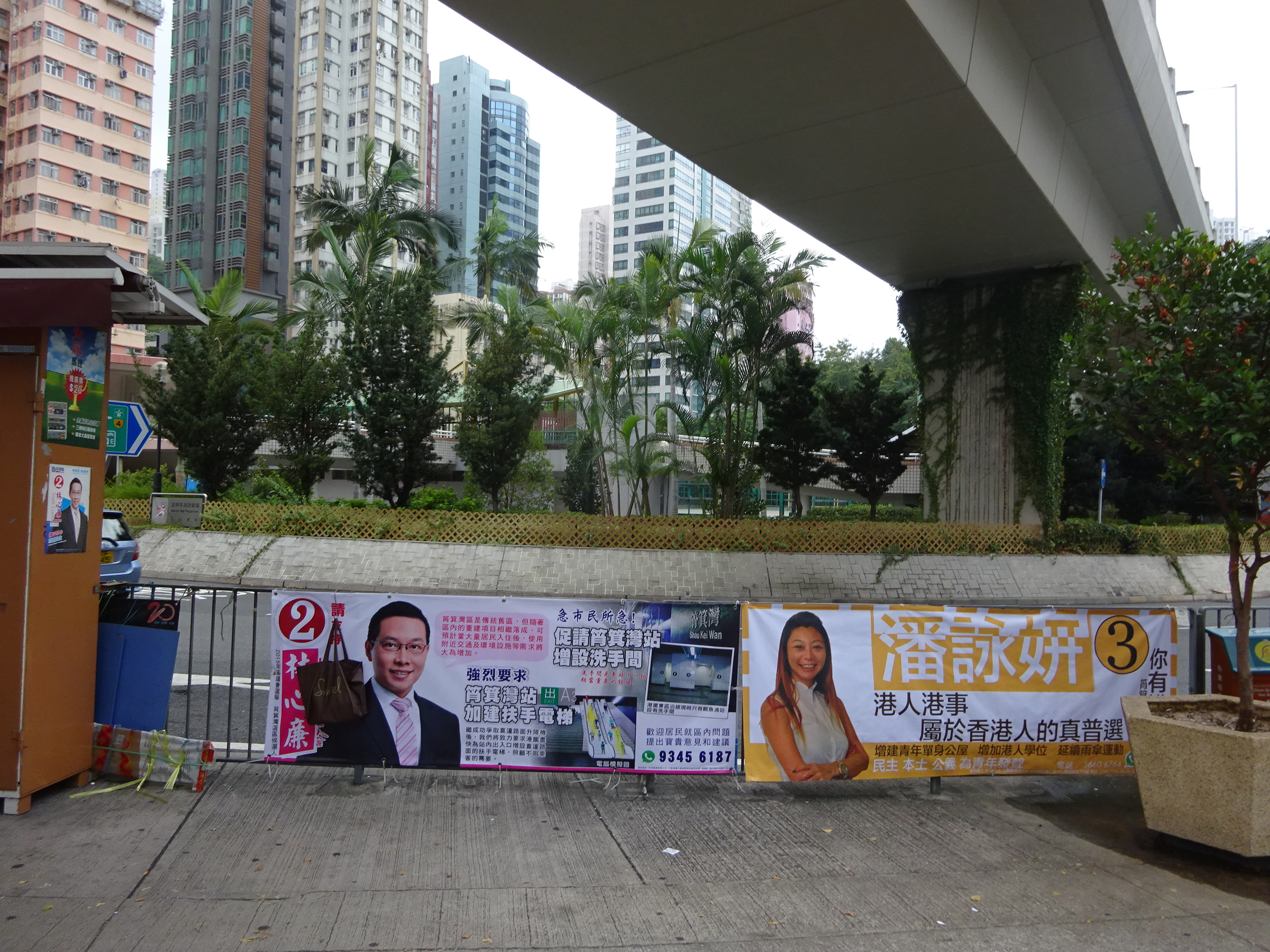
Election banners in the 2015 election.

Eastern District Council Election, 2015: Shaukeiwan
Party	Candidate	Votes	%	±%
DAB	Lam Sum-lin	1,444	48.46	−4.77
Independent	Leung Wing-sze	1,429	47.95	
Independent	Poon Wing-yin	107	3.59	
Majority		15	0.51	
Turnout		2,980	46.47	+10.2
DAB hold		Swing		

Eastern District Council Election, 2011: Shaukeiwan
Party	Candidate	Votes	%	±%
DAB	Lo Tip-chun	1,260	53.23	−10.82
LSD	Chiu Yuet-oi	1,107	46.77	
Majority		153	6.46	
Turnout		2,367	36.81	
DAB hold		Swing		

=== 2000s ===
Eastern District Council Election, 2007: Shaukeiwan
Party	Candidate	Votes	%	±%
DAB	Lo Tip-chun	1,192	64.05	
Independent	Chiu Yuet-oi	669	35.95	
Majority		523	28.10	
DAB hold		Swing		

Eastern District Council Election, 2003: Shaukeiwan
Party	Candidate	Votes	%	±%
DAB	Lo Tip-chun	uncontested		
DAB hold		Swing		

=== 1990s ===
Eastern District Council Election, 1999: Shau Kei Wan
Party	Candidate	Votes	%	±%
DAB	Lo Tip-chun	uncontested		
DAB hold		Swing		

Eastern District Board Election, 1994: Shau Kei Wan
Party	Candidate	Votes	%	±%
DAB	Lo Tip-chun	732	51.40	
Liberal	Shum Chi-kin	457	32.09	
Independent	Tam Kwok-chi	235	16.50	
DAB gain from Independent		Swing		

Eastern District Board Election, 1991: Shau Kei Wan
Party	Candidate	Votes	%	±%
Independent	Hui Ka-ho	632	42.44	
Independent	Cheung Kin-chung	567	38.08	
Independent	Lee Siu-mau	290	19.48	
Independent gain from HKDF		Swing		

=== 1980s ===
Eastern District Board Election, 1988: Shau Kei Wan
Party	Candidate	Votes	%	±%
Independent	Chan Ying-lun	1,557	63.16	
Independent	Ho To-hing	908	36.84	
Independent win (new seat)				
