= Li Wing-choi =

Hong Kong politician

Gary Li Wing-choi (born 19 August 1991) is a Hong Kong politician who represented Victoria Park on Wan Chai District Council from 2020 to 2021. He was elected as a member of the Victoria Social Association but following charges of wanting 'Hong Kong independence' in the pro-Beijing Wen Wei Po newspaper, he quit the organisation along with fellow district councillors Jordan Pang and Louis Ho Chi-wang. On 9 July 2021, he resigned the council rather than submit to swearing the ‘oath of allegiance’ demanded by the government.
