= 2011 Eastern District Council election =

Hong Kong local election

- 6 November 2011

37 (of the 43) seats to Eastern District Council 22 seats needed for a majority
- Turnout: 41.1%
	First party	Second party	Third party
Party	DAB	Civic	Democratic
Last election	14 seats, 33.5%	2 seats, 8.1%	3 seats, 14.2%
Seats before	15	3	2
Seats won	16	3	2
Seat change	▲1	Steady	Steady
Popular vote	10,913	6,739	10,328
Percentage	13.3%	8.2%	12.5%
Swing	▼20.2%	▲0.1%	▼1.7%
	Fourth party	Fifth party	Sixth party
Party	Liberal	NPP	FTU
Last election	2 seats, 1.7%	New party	Did not run
Seats before	1	0	0
Seats won	2	1	1
Seat change	▲1	▲1	▲1
Popular vote	1,355	3,761	2,577
Percentage	1.6%	4.6%	3.1%
Swing	▼0.1%	N/A	N/A
- Colours on map indicate winning party for each constituency.

The 2011 Eastern District Council election was held on 6 November 2011 to elect all 37 elected members to the 43-member District Council.

== Overall election results ==
Before election:

↓
9	1	27
Pro-dem	I.	Pro-Beijing

Change in composition:

↓
5	1	31
PD	I.	Pro-Beijing

Eastern District Council election result 2011
Party	Seats	Gains	Losses	Net gain/loss	Seats %	Votes %	Votes	+/−
Independent	12	2	4	−2	32.4	48.1	39,565	
DAB	16	1	0	+1	43.2	13.3	10,913	−20.2
Democratic	2	0	0	0	5.4	12.5	10,328	−1.7
LSD	0	0	2	−2	0	8.6	7,075	+2.5
Civic	3	0	0	0	8.1	8.2	6,739	+0.1
NPP	1	1	0	+1	2.7	4.6	3,761	
FTU	1	1	0	+1	2.7	3.1	2,577	
Liberal	2	1	0	+1	5.4	1.6	1,355	−0.1
