= Carson Wen =

Hong Kong lawyer, businessman, and politician

Carson Wen BBS, JP
- 溫嘉旋

Vice-Chairman of the Democratic Alliance for the Betterment and Progress of Hong Kong
- In office 15 April 2009 – 19 April 2011
- Chairman: Tam Yiu-chung
- Preceded by: Ip Kwok-him
- Succeeded by: Starry Lee; Horace Cheung

Hong Kong Deputy to the National People's Congress
- In office 8 December 1997 – 19 December 2012
- Chairman: Qiao Shi; Li Peng; Wu Bangguo

Personal details
- Party: Hong Kong Progressive Alliance (1994–2005); Democratic Alliance for the Betterment and Progress of Hong Kong (2005–present)
- Spouse: Fung Yuet-shan
- Education: Columbia University; Balliol College, Oxford
- Occupation: Solicitor businessman Politician

Carson Wen
- Traditional Chinese: 溫嘉旋
- Simplified Chinese: 温嘉旋
Transcriptions
Standard Mandarin
- Hanyu Pinyin: Wēn Jiāxuán
Yue: Cantonese
- Jyutping: wan1 gaa1 syun4

Carson Wen Ka-shuen, BBS, JP (Chinese: 溫嘉旋) is a Hong Kong businessman, lawyer and politician.

== Education ==
Wen received his B.A. from Columbia College, Columbia University in 1975, and received his B.A. and M.A. from Balliol College, Oxford, where he studied law and was Younger Prizeman in Law for 1976.

== Career ==
He was a three-term deputy to the National People's Congress elected in 1997. He was also a former chairman of the Hong Kong Progressive Alliance and vice chairman of the Democratic Alliance for the Betterment and Progress of Hong Kong, elected in 2009. After he left in 2011, he remained an advisor to the party.

He is an independent director of Phoenix New Media Ltd. He was appointed as a Justice of the Peace (JP) by the Government of Hong Kong in 2002. He is the Executive Council member of the Sustainable Business Network of the United Nations Economic and Social Commission for Asia and the Pacific (ESCAP).

In 2016, Wen retired from the law firm Jones Day. Wen is currently Chairman of Bank of Asia (BVI), a digital, cross-border bank based in the British Virgin Islands, and the first bank to be authorized in the BVI in two decades. In 2018, he launched Eurasia Continental Fintech in Astana International Financial Centre.

== Awards ==
In 2007, he was awarded the Bronze Bauhinia Star by the Government of Hong Kong for his contribution to economic ties between Hong Kong, Mainland China and the rest of the world.

Party political offices
Preceded by Ip Kwok-him	Vice-Chairman of Democratic Alliance for the Betterment and Progress of Hong Kong; 2009–2011; Served alongside: Lau Kong-wah, Ann Chiang	Succeeded by Starry Lee; Horace Cheung
