= 2007 Eastern District Council election =

Hong Kong local election

- 18 November 2007

37 (of the 46) seats to Eastern District Council 23 seats needed for a majority
- Turnout: 35.9%
	First party	Second party	Third party
Party	DAB	Democratic	Civic
Last election	12 seats, 27.3%	6 seats, 19.2%	New party
Seats before	12	5	1
Seats won	14	3	2
Seat change	▲2	▼2	▲1
Popular vote	33,127	14,065	7,989
Percentage	33.5%	14.2%	8.1%
Swing	▲6.2%	▼5.0%	N/A
	Fourth party	Fifth party
Party	LSD	Liberal
Last election	New party	1 seat, 2.7%
Seats before	2	1
Seats won	2	2
Seat change	Steady	▲1
Popular vote	5,821	1,669
Percentage	5.9%	1.7%
Swing	N/A	▼1.0%
- Colours on map indicate winning party for each constituency.

The 2007 Eastern District Council election was held on 18 November 2007 to elect all 37 elected members to the 46-member District Council.

== Overall election results ==
Before election:

↓
13	2	22
Pro-democracy	I.	Pro-Beijing

Change in composition:

↓
10	1	26
Pro-dem	I.	Pro-Beijing

Eastern District Council election result 2007
Party	Seats	Gains	Losses	Net gain/loss	Seats %	Votes %	Votes	+/−
DAB	14	3	1	+2	37.8	33.5	33,127	+6.2
Independent	12	2	4	−2	32.4	32.4	32,028	
Democratic	3	1	3	–2	8.1	14.2	14,065	−5.0
Civic	2	1	0	+1	5.4	8.1	7,989	N/A
LSD	2	0	0	0	5.4	5.9	5,821	N/A
Democratic Coalition	2	0	0	0	5.4	4.3	4,253	
Liberal	2	1	0	+1	5.4	1.7	1,669	−1.0
