= Kwan Lim-ho =

Hong Kong lawyer and politician

Kwan Lim-ho (Chinese: 關廉豪; born 1947) is a Hong Kong lawyer and politician. He was an elected member of the Urban Council of Hong Kong, Eastern District Board and Yau Tsim District Board.

Kwan was born in Hong Kong and was graduated from the Tung Wah Hospital Number One School and was enrolled to the law faculty of the University College London. He was graduated in 1975 and began his practice in Hong Kong in 1975, subsequently set up his own law firm in 1977.

In 1980 he became the standing committee member and the chairman of the youth wing of the Reform Club of Hong Kong. In the first District Board elections in 1982, he was elected to the Eastern District Board through Quarry Bay. In the 1983 Urban Council election, Kwan was elected to the Urban Council and was re-elected in 1986 through Yau Ma Tei. He was responsible for licensing for the entertainment business during his service in the Urban Council.

He contested in the first Legislative Council election in 1985 in East Island electoral college but was defeated by Desmond Lee. In the 1995 Legislative Council election, Kwan ran in the Import and Export functional constituency, but was defeated by Henry Tang of the Liberal Party. He also contested in the 2000 Election Committee subsector elections in the Catering subsector but was not elected.

Kwan Lim-ho suffered a stroke and collapsed in the middle of a press conference in 2005 on behalf of the Entertainment Business Rights Concern Group. He was unconscious when sent to Queen Elizabeth Hospital.

Political offices
New title	Member of the Eastern District Board; Representative for Quarry Bay; 1982–1983	Succeeded by Joseph Salaroli
New constituency	Member of the Urban Council; Representative for North Point; 1983–1986	Succeeded by Man Sai-cheong
Preceded by Denny Huang	Member of the Urban Council; Representative for Yau Ma Tei; 1986–1989	Succeeded by Daniel Wong
