= Joseph Lai =

Hong Kong educator and politician

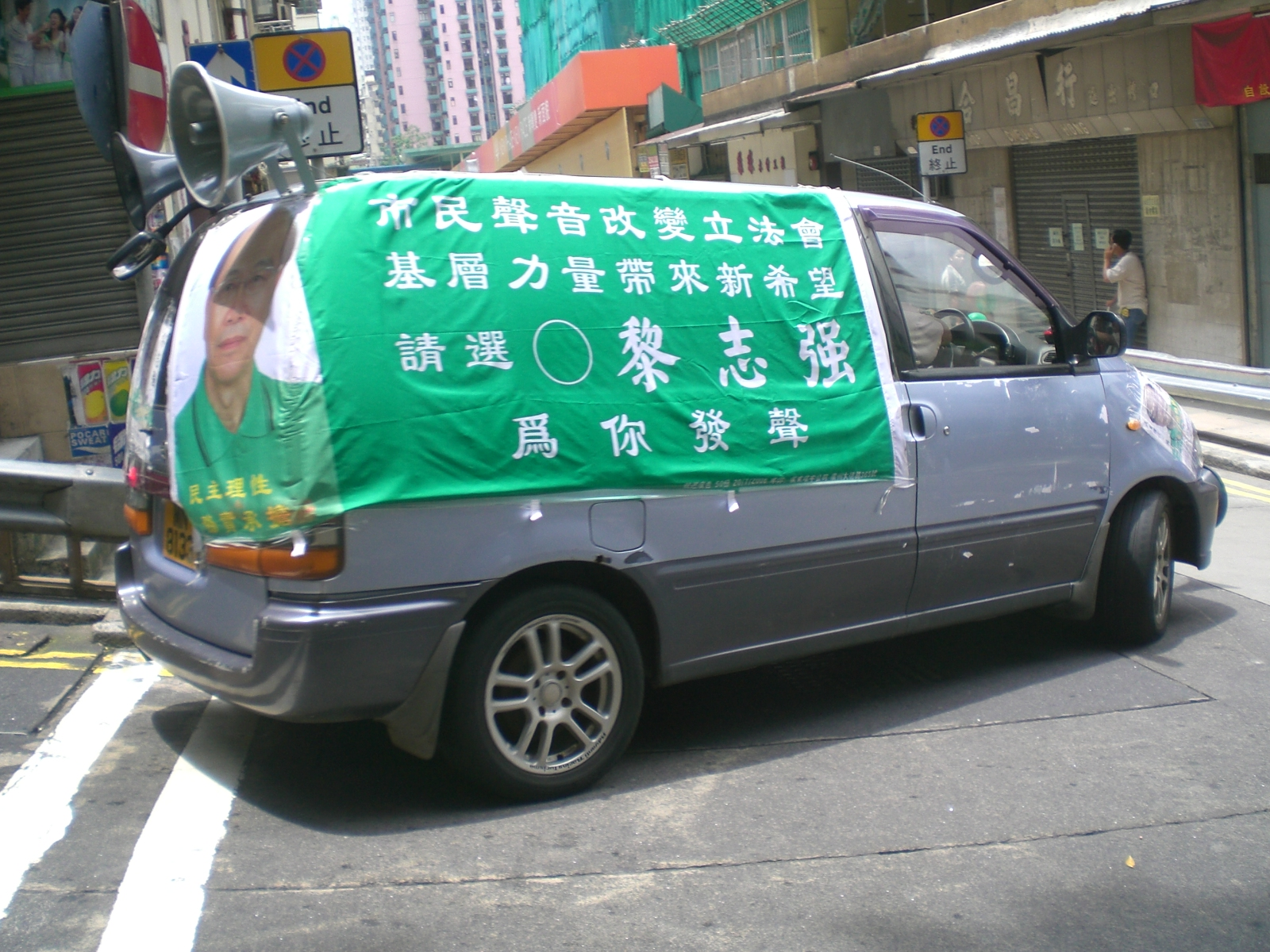
Van with poster encouraging to vote for Joseph Lai

Joseph Lai Chi-keong (Chinese: 黎志強; born 13 December 1947) is a Hong Kong educator and politician. He is a former chairman of the Eastern District Council and former member of the Eastern District Council since 1988, having representing Fei Tsui from 1994 until 2021. He is member of the Civic Party and a former member of the Democratic Party and Urban Council.

== Biography ==
As a teacher, Lai joined the Hong Kong Professional Teachers' Union (HKPTU) in the 1980s. He ran in the 1988 District Board election in Chai Wan West. He was the founding member of the United Democrats of Hong Kong and later Democratic Party. He contested in the 1995 Urban Council election in Quarry Bay and was elected with nearly 6,000 votes.

He remained as Eastern District Councillor after 1997. In 2000 and 2004 Legislative Council elections, he ran on the Democratic Party's ticket, placing the fourth place and the third place respectively. In 2004, he as the third candidate on the list was nearly elected, being defeated by Choy So-yuk, the second candidate of the Democratic Alliance for the Betterment of Hong Kong (DAB) by a narrow margin. Lai was eager to run in the 2000 Hong Kong Island by-election, but was rejected by the party and the leadership decided to support barrister Audrey Eu's candidate.

In the 2008 Legislative Council election, Lai quit the Democratic Party after he was not nominated by the party and ran as independent. He failed to be elected with only 3,955 votes, 1.26 per cent of the total vote share. After the election, he joined Audrey Eu's Civic Party. Lai was tipped for running in the District Council (Second) functional constituency for the Civic Party in the 2012 Legislative Council election but did not materialise.

In the 2019 District Council election after the pro-democrats received the largest landslide in history and seized the control of the 17 of the 18 District Councils, Lai was elected as the chairman of the Eastern District Council.

Political offices
Preceded by Kwan Miu-mei	Member of Eastern District Board; Representative for Chai Wan West; 1988–1994	Constituency abolished
New constituency	Member of Eastern District Council; Representative for Fei Tsui; 1994–2021	Vacant
New title	Member of Urban Council; Representative for Quarry Bay; 1989–1999	Council abolished
Preceded by Wong Kin-pan	Chairman of Eastern District Council; 2020–2021	Succeeded by Leung Wing-sze
