= Jordan Pang =

Hong Kong politician

- 彭家浩
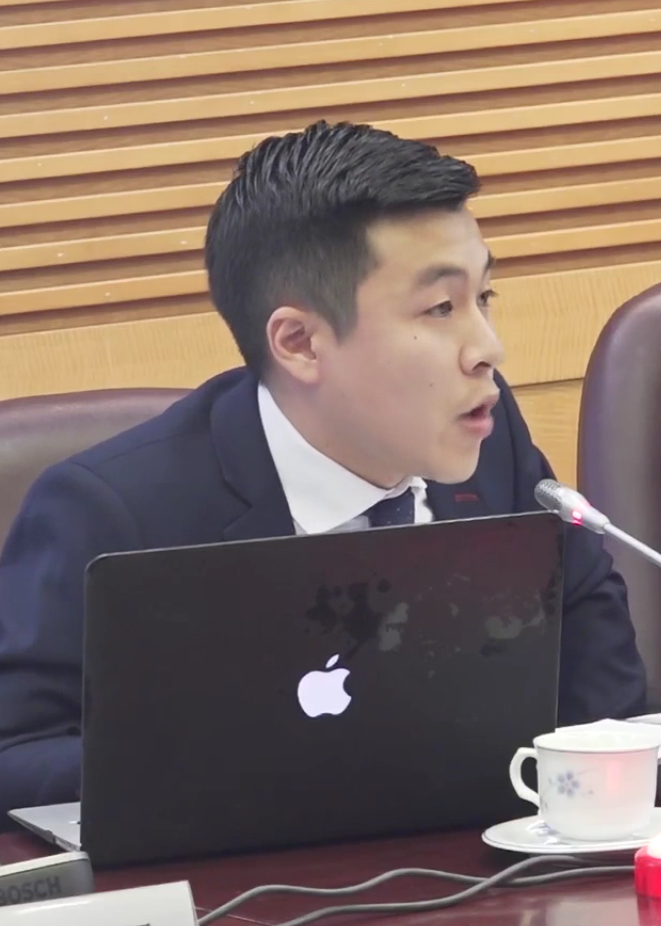

Central and Western District Council
- Incumbent
- Assumed office 1 January 2020
- Preceded by: Horace Cheung
- Constituency: Sai Wan

Personal details
- Born: 1998 (age 27–28) Hong Kong
- Party: Independent
- Other political affiliations: Victoria Social Association (until 2020)
- Education: University of Hong Kong; Hong Kong University of Science and Technology

Jordan Pang
- Chinese: 彭家浩
Transcriptions
Standard Mandarin
- Hanyu Pinyin: Péng Jiāhào

Jordan Pang Ka-ho (Chinese: 彭家浩; born 1998) is a Hong Kong District Councillor. He was a student leader and served as the Vice-President (External) of the Hong Kong University Students' Union (HKUSU) and Acting Chairperson of the Current Affairs Committee, HKUSU Council. In 2019, whilst a university student, he defeated the incumbent pro-Beijing politician, "triple councillor" (having held positions in the district council, Legislative Council and Executive Council) Horace Cheung and became the District Councillor of Sai Wan in the Central and Western District Council, making him the second youngest District Councillor in Hong Kong's history. Pang's focus areas as District Councillor include urban planning, improving public space and strengthening public participation.

== Early life and education ==
Jordan Pang was born in Hong Kong in 1998. His mother is Korean and his father is a HongKonger. He has one sibling. His elder brother, Michael Pang, is also a politician who served as Southern District Councillor from 2020 to 2021.

=== Secondary education ===
Pang completed his secondary education at Kwok Tak Seng Catholic Secondary School where he received a champion of Hong Kong Student Science Project Competition 2012.

=== HKU and HKU Student Union ===
He studies politics and public administration at the University of Hong Kong. He was a member of Ricci Hall, one of the oldest residential halls at HKU. In 2018, he served as the Vice-president (External) of the Hong Kong University Students' Union (HKUSU). In 2019, he briefly served as the Acting Chairperson of the Current Affairs Committee, HKUSU Council.

=== Receiving death threats ===
In August 2019, during the Anti-Extradition Law Amendment Bill Movement, Pang and several pro-democracy student leaders received multiple death threats against them via Facebook and Telegram, and their families received threatening phone-calls.

=== Postgraduate education ===
Pang received his MSc in Global Operations from Hong Kong University of Science and Technology Business School in 2023.

== Political career ==
=== 2019 District Councils Election ===
In the 2019 District Councils elections, Pang, a 21-year-old fourth-year university student, ran for Central and Western District Council's Sai Wan constituency. The seat had been held by Horace Cheung, vice-chairman of the Democratic Alliance for the Betterment and Progress of Hong Kong, since 2011. In addition to his District Council post, Cheung served on the Legislative Council and Executive Council, giving him the title of "triple councillor". Pang won the election by nearly 800 votes, making him the second youngest District Councillor in Hong Kong's history. The youngest, Roy Pun, is three months younger than Pang. The youngest, Roy Pun, is three months younger than Pang. On the result of the election, Pang said it was mainly due to the protests and there was "still a long road ahead". He also promised to focus on local issues, and hold regular forums.

Central & Western District Council Election, 2019: Sai Wan
Party	Candidate	Votes	%	±%
Ind. democrat	Jordan Pang	3,289	56.48	
DAB	Cheung Kwok-kwan	2,494	42.83	−8.57
Nonpartisan	Shirley Wong Mi-hing	40	0.69	
Majority		795	13.65	
Ind. democrat gain from DAB		Swing		

=== Improving district hygiene ===
In November 2019, the Food and Environmental Hygiene Department (FEHD) of the Hong Kong Government removed many bins in the Central and Western District, causing an imminent hygiene problem in the district as citizens could not dispose of waste properly. As District Councillor-elect, Pang urged the FEHD to reallocate bins in the district, saying that the government should focus on solving the root cause of protests, instead of removing bins (often used as protest tools). In December 2019, the FEHD started to place rubbish and recycling bins in the Central and Western District.

=== Interviewed by RTHK's Pentaprism ===
On December 2, 2019, Pang was interviewed by RTHK's Pentaprism. During the interview, Pang reiterated his commitment to fight for democracy and improve the livelihoods of his constituents. “After winning a landslide victory, pro-democracy District Councillors should get prepared to take on our jobs, serving the people and communities,” he added.

=== Questioning Chris Tang ===
Hong Kong Police Commissioner Chris Tang attended the Central and Western District Council meeting on January 16, 2020 to answer councillors’ questions over allegations of police brutality. During his question time, Pang stated that he “does not oppose the existence of police force, but the police should review and reflect on their actions and behaviour over the past seven months”. Tang replied that “every person, including police, who violated the law should be arrested”.

=== Leaving Victoria Social Association ===
Pang was elected to the council while a member of the Victoria Social Association. He left the group in June 2020, shortly before the national security law was enacted, because of the new law and accusations of being 'pro-independence' by the pro-Beijing Wen Wei Po newspaper. The group disbanded shortly afterwards.

=== Improving children's playground facilities ===
In November 2020, Pang raised a new proposal on district minor works projects 2020-2021 and related funding applications to improve facilities at the Smithfield Road Children's Playground. According to District Works & Facilities Management Committee Discussion Papers of the Central and Western District Council, the proposal includes improving playground equipment and plants, and reducing smoking. Moreover, a follow-up public consultation was implemented by the Hong Kong Institute of Planners, the Leisure and Cultural Services Department (LCSD) and Pang.

In June 2021, Pang announced on his Facebook page that the renovation work at Belcher Bay Children's Playground (age 5-12) had been completed in February 2021, and further work to improve facilities at Belcher Bay Children's Playground (age 2-5) will begin shortly. The LCSD, upon Pang's request, will add more playground equipment such as swings, rope courses and merry-go-rounds. Related funding applications were approved by the Central and Western District Council and works are scheduled to be completed in July 2021.

=== Improving Belcher Bay Promenade facilities ===
In March 2021, Pang was interviewed by on.cc as Belcher Bay Promenade was officially open to the public. Pang said he had received complaints from citizens on dog park facilities. Pang suggested that the authorities should improve facilities at the dog park and add more shelters for pet owners.

=== Valid oath-taking ===
The Public Offices (Candidacy and Taking Up Offices) (Miscellaneous Amendments) Ordinance 2021 amends certain legislation, including requiring District Council (DC) members to take an oath to uphold the Basic Law of the HKSAR and bear allegiance to the HKSAR of the PRC. On September 10, 2021, the Hong Kong Government held the oath-taking ceremony for DC members from the Central and Western District Council, the Wan Chai District Council, the Eastern District Council and the Southern District Council at North Point Community Hall. The oath administrator determined that the oath taken by Jordan Pang was valid.

=== Improving soccer pitch facilities ===
In November 2021, Pang suggested to the government to improve soccer pitch facilities during the Central and Western District Council meeting. The LCSD replied that improvement works of soccer pitches at Conduit Road Service Reservoir Playground and Forbes Street Temporary Playground will begin in the year of 2021-22. The existing 7-a-side soccer pitches will be changed to 5-a-side soccer pitches, fitting the FIFA standards. Pang asked the LCSD to study if 7-a-side soccer pitches can be mixed with 5-a-side soccer pitches as a one-size-fits-all approach may not be practical. Moreover, Pang urged the LCSD to add more AED machines to soccer pitches and basketball courts across Hong Kong.

== District Council Services ==
- Member, District Council
- Chairman, Finance Committee
- Member, Constitutional & Security Affairs Committee
- Member, Cultural, Education, Healthcare, Leisure & Social Affairs Committee
- Member, District Works & Facilities Management Committee
- Member, Building Management, Environmental Hygiene & Works Committee
- Member, Traffic & Transport Committee
- Member, Working Group on Historic Town District and Heritage Conservation
- Member, Working Group on the Central & Western District Harbourfront
- Member, Working Group on Town Planning of Central and Western District
- Member, Ad-hoc Working Group on Review of Standing Orders of Central and Western District Council
- Member, Working Group on Information Technology
- Member, Working Group on Elderly Service
- Member, Working Group on Healthy Community
- Member, Working Group on Walkable City and Electronic Road Pricing
- Member, Working Group on Environmental Improvement, Greening and Beautification Works in C&W District
- Member, Working Group on Building Management and Anti-bid-rigging
- Member, Working Group on Animal-friendly in the Central & Western District
- Member, Working Group on Concern over Bazaar Policy
