= Chui Chi-kin =

Hong Kong politician

- 徐子見
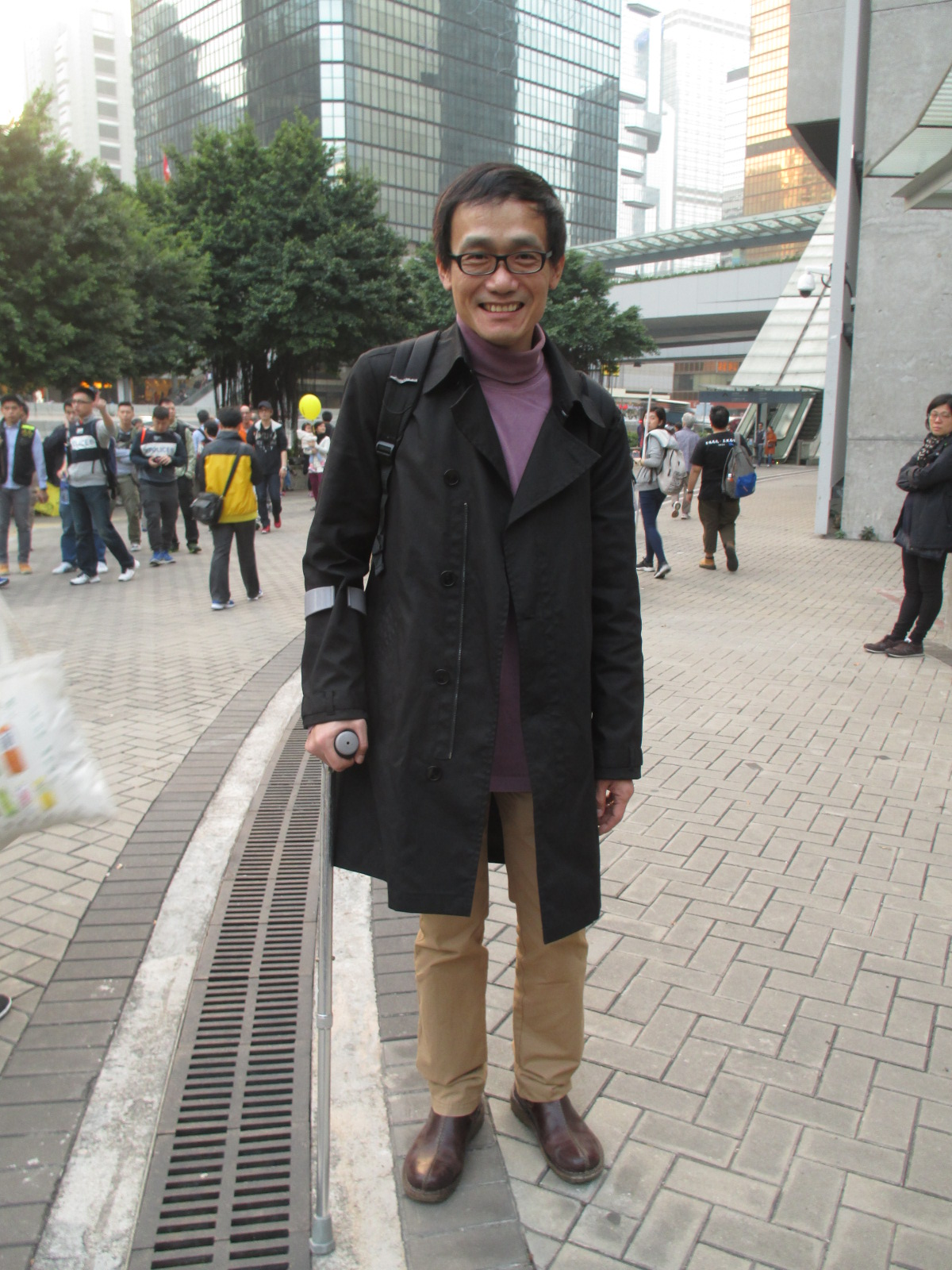

Member of the Eastern District Council
- In office 1 January 2016 – 9 May 2021
- Preceded by: Christopher Chung
- Constituency: Yue Wan

Personal details
- Born: 1967 (age 58–59) British Hong Kong
- Party: Chai Wan Startup
- Occupation: Trader

Andy Chui Chi-kin (Chinese: 徐子見) is a member of the Eastern District Council, representing Yue Wan constituency in Hong Kong.

Chui is a trader by occupation and participated in the 79-day Occupy sit-ins in 2014. Inspired by the Occupy movement, he formed a group called “umbrella fathers and mothers” with other protesters and ran in the 2015 Hong Kong district council elections against long-term incumbent Christopher Chung Shu-kun, who was also the member of the Legislative Council of Hong Kong for the Democratic Alliance for the Betterment and Progress of Hong Kong, the largest Beijing-loyalist party in Hong Kong, in Yue Wan, his home of more than two decades. He remained unknown to the media until he beat Chung by 2,017 votes to 1,826, a "miracle" portrayed by the media. Chui successfully defended his seat in the 2019 Hong Kong district council elections, winning with 3,814 votes over DAB (FTU) candidate Lau Kin, who scored 2,374 votes.

== Arrests ==
On 28 June 2020, Chui stated on his Facebook page that he had been among those arrested during protests against the looming National Security Legislation.

On 8 December 2020, Chui was arrested for his alleged involvement in the unauthorized 1 July march that year. Seven other democrats were arrested the same day on similar charges.

On 6 January 2021, Chui was among 53 members of the pro-democratic camp who were arrested under the national security law, specifically its provision regarding alleged subversion. The group stood accused of the organisation of and participation in unofficial primary elections held by the camp in July 2020. Chui was released on bail on 7 January.

== See also ==
- Umbrella Movement

Political offices
| Preceded by Christopher Chung | Member of the Eastern District Council; Representative for Yue Wan; 2016–2021 | Vacant |
