= Alliance for Social and Economic Advancement =

Alliance for Social and Economic Advancement 保障民生建設聯盟
- Chairperson: Herman Yuen
- Founded: 10 September 2019
- Legislative Council: 0 / 90
- District Councils: 0 / 470

Website
- hkasea.org

The Alliance for Social and Economic Advancement (Chinese: 保障民生建設聯盟) is a political party in Hong Kong. The party was founded on 10 September 2019 and is led by Herman Yuen. The party describes itself as part of a "construction camp", preferring to focus on citizen livelihood and public policy rather than politics. The party fielded three candidates in the 2019 Hong Kong local elections. In response to criticism regarding the party only fielding candidates in constituencies held by pro-Beijing district councillors, Yuen said the choice of constituencies was made based on familiarity with each area and a dissatisfaction with livelihood work there. Although the party is part of the pro-Beijing camp, it believes that the government's response to the 2019–20 Hong Kong protests has been ineffective and that the government should better listen to its people.

The party's political positions include modifying the Lantau Tomorrow Vision, land reclamation at the Ngong Shuen Chau Naval Base and at Sandy Bay, an elderly care plan in the Greater Bay Area, and the construction of a comprehensive elderly care complex near Guangzhou South railway station.
