= Christopher Chung (politician) =

Hong Kong politician (born 1957)

Christopher Chung Shu-kun SBS, JP
- 鍾樹根
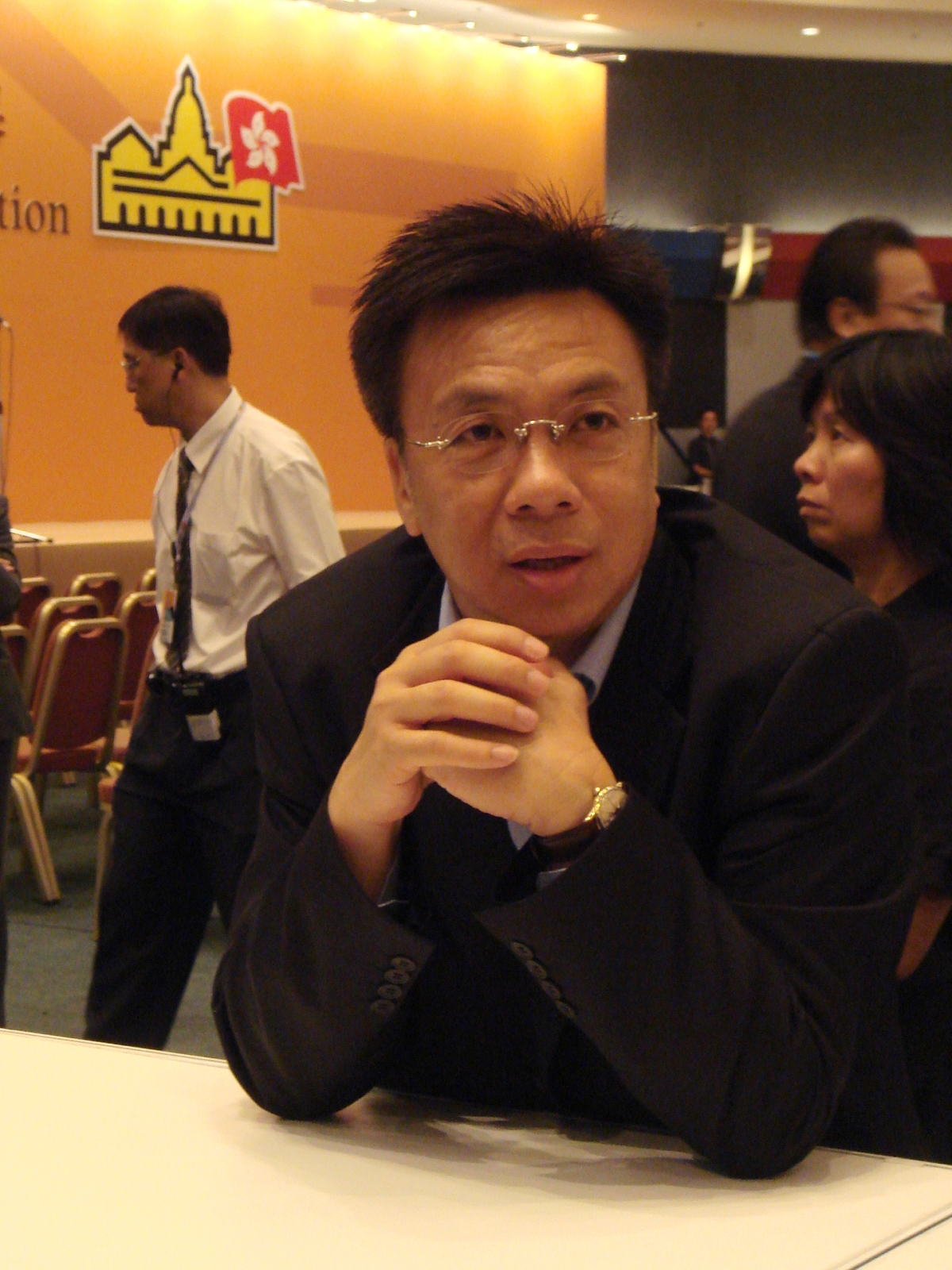

Member of the Legislative Council
- In office 1 October 2012 – 30 September 2016
- Preceded by: Audrey Eu
- Succeeded by: Horace Cheung Kwok-kwan
- Constituency: Hong Kong Island

Chairman of the Eastern District Council
- In office 6 January 2012 – 28 November 2012
- Preceded by: Christina Ting
- Succeeded by: Wong Kin-pan

Personal details
- Born: 31 March 1957 (age 69) Hong Kong
- Party: Democratic Alliance for the Betterment and Progress of Hong Kong
- Education: University of Hong Kong (Diploma); Glasgow Caledonian University (BSc); University of Wales, Newport (now the University of South Wales) (MBA)
- Occupation: Legislative Councillor

Christopher Chung
- Traditional Chinese: 鍾樹根
- Simplified Chinese: 钟树根
Transcriptions
Standard Mandarin
- Hanyu Pinyin: Zhōng Shùgēn
Yue: Cantonese
- Jyutping: zung1 syu6 gan1

Christopher Chung Shu-kun, SBS, JP (Chinese: 鍾樹根; born 31 March 1957, commonly known as "Tree Gun") was elected to the Legislative Council of Hong Kong in 2012, representing the Hong Kong Island constituency. He is also former chairman of Eastern District Council, and a former councillor from 1991 to 2015, representing the Yue Wan constituency. He is a veteran member of the Democratic Alliance for the Betterment and Progress of Hong Kong, the flagship pro-Beijing party in Hong Kong. He was awarded the Silver Bauhinia Star by the Hong Kong SAR Government in 2017.

== Biography ==
Chung was born in Hong Kong in 1957. He was inspired by Mao Zedong Thought when he was young and joined the pro-Beijing organisation Hok Yau Club in 1974, where he went on to become its president. During the 1980s when the colonial government introduced elections to the District Boards, he participated in the discussion in the club which decided not to participate.

He first contested in the 1988 District Board elections, where he initially considered standing in North Point, but switched with Chan Yuen-han and ran in Chai Wan, where he lost the Reform Club's Brook Bernacchi and nonpartisan Wong Ming-kuen. In 1989, Chung represented the club to join the Hong Kong Alliance in Support of Patriotic Democratic Movements in China during the Tiananmen Square protests of 1989 in China but left after a half year.

He was first elected to the Eastern District Board in 1991 through Chai Wan East. He joined the newly established Democratic Alliance for the Betterment of Hong Kong (DAB), the flagship pro-Beijing party in 1993. He went on to become the chairman of the party branch in Hong Kong Island East. He was also one of the last Urban Councillor elected in 1995 until the council was abolished in 2000.

Since the 1998 Legislative Council election, he had been nominated in the DAB party list in Hong Kong Island placing after party's big names such as Cheng Kai-nam, Choy So-yuk, Ma Lik and Tsang Yok-sing. In 2000, after DAB legislator Cheng Kai-nam resigned soon right the 2000 Legislative Council election after he was suspected of corruption. The party nominated Chung as the candidate for the by-election against barrister Audrey Eu who was supported by the pro-democracy camp. Chung received more than 78,000 votes, 37 percent of the total votes and was defeated by Eu.

Chung was briefly chairman of the Eastern District Council in 2012. He was then nominated by the party to lead a candidate list in the 2012 Legislative Council election, while another DAB list was led by Legislative Council President Tsang Yok-sing. Both DAB lists successfully win a seat, while Chung's list received nearly 34,000 votes and took the fourth out of nine seats in Hong Kong Island.

In 2013, Chung was accused of making racist comments in a LegCo debate, during which he described foreigners as "flawed by nature", that they "knew nothing about Hongkong" and therefore were not fit to manage the West Kowloon Cultural District project. He is widely known by the nickname "Tree Gun", direct translation and transliteration of the two characters of his Chinese name, respectively.

He was surprisingly defeated by Chui Chi-kin, an "umbrella soldier" inspired by the 2014 Hong Kong protests almost unknown to the public before he was elected in the 2015 District Council election with 2,017 votes against Chung's 1,829 votes in Yue Wan, which ended his 25-year service as District Councillor.

After having been listed by the party as a candidate for the 2016 Legislative Council election, he was dropped in May 2016 when the party decided to field only one candidate list in Hong Kong Island, to be led by Horace Cheung. He protested the party's decision and considered running as an independent.

== Personal life ==
Chung worked in the information technology field after graduating from secondary school, in which he had worked at the Chinese University of Hong Kong and the Hong Kong Jockey Club until he became full-time district councillor in 1999. At the age of 47, he went back to school, studying master's degrees at the Glasgow Caledonian University and the University of Wales. He began his doctoral studies in Business Administration at the London South Bank University since 2011 but has stopped his study due to the 2012 election.

His wife is a retired Chinese teacher and his daughter is an English teacher.

Political offices
| Preceded by Brook Bernacchi | Member of the Eastern District Board; Representative for Chai Wan North; 1991–1994 | Constituency abolished |
| New constituency | Member of the Eastern District Council; Representative for Yue Wan; 1994–2015 | Succeeded by Chui Chi-kin |
| New constituency | Member of the Urban Council; Representative for Chai Wan East; 1995–1997 | Replaced by Provisional Urban Council |
| New creation | Member of the Provisional Urban Council; 1997–1999 | Council abolished |
| Preceded by Christina Ting Yuk-chee | Chairman of the Eastern District Council; 2012 | Succeeded by Wong Kin-pan |
Legislative Council of Hong Kong
| Preceded by Audrey Eu | Member of Legislative Council; Representative for Hong Kong Island; 2012–2016 | Succeeded by Horace Cheung Kwok-kwan |
