= Eastern District Council =

Hong Kong district council

Eastern District Council 東區區議會

Type
- Type: Hong Kong District Council of the Eastern District, Hong Kong

History
- Founded: 28 October 1981 (District Board); 1 July 1997 (Provisional); 1 January 2000 (District Council)

Leadership
- Chair: Simon Chan Sheung-man, Independent

Structure
- Seats: 30 councillors consisting of 6 elected members 12 district committee members 12 appointed members
- DAB: 13 / 30
- FTU: 3 / 30
- NPP: 3 / 30
- Liberal: 2 / 30
- BPA: 1 / 30
- FEW: 1 / 30
- Independent: 7 / 30

Elections
- Voting system: First past the post
- Last election: 10 December 2023

Meeting place
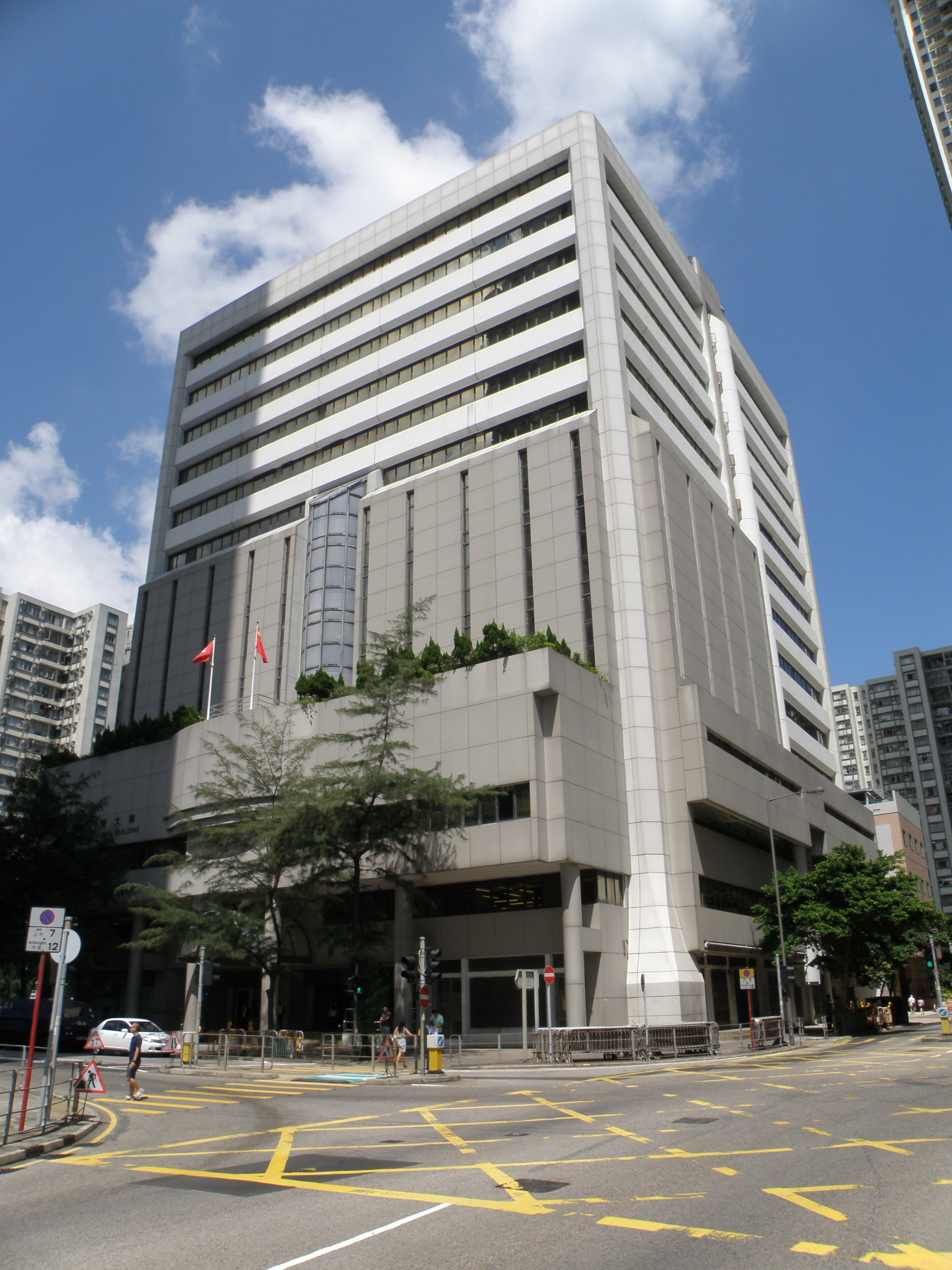
- 11/F, Eastern Law Court Building, 29 Tai On Street, Sai Wan Ho, Hong Kong

Website
- www.districtcouncils.gov.hk/east/

Eastern District Council
- Traditional Chinese: 東區區議會
- Simplified Chinese: 东区区议会
Transcriptions
Standard Mandarin
- Hanyu Pinyin: Dōngqūqūyìhuì
Yue: Cantonese
- Yale Romanization: Dūng kēui kēui yíh wúih
- Jyutping: Dung1 keoi1 keoi1 ji5 wui5

The Eastern District Council (noted as East) is the district council for the Eastern District in Hong Kong. It is one of 18 such councils. The Eastern District Council currently consists of 35 members, of which the district is divided into three constituencies, electing a total of 6 members, 12 district committee members, and 12 appointed members. The last election was held on 10 December 2023.

== History ==
The Eastern District Council was established on 28 October 1981 under the name of the Eastern District Board as the result of the colonial Governor Murray MacLehose's District Administration Scheme reform. The District Board was partly elected with the ex-officio Urban Council members, as well as members appointed by the Governor until 1994 when last Governor Chris Patten refrained from appointing any member.

The Eastern District Board became Eastern Provisional District Board after the Hong Kong Special Administrative Region (HKSAR) was established in 1997 with the appointment system being reintroduced by Chief Executive Tung Chee-hwa. The Eastern District Council was established on 1 January 2000 after the first District Council election in 1999. The council has become fully elected when the appointed seats were abolished in 2011 after the modified constitutional reform proposal was passed by the Legislative Council in 2010.

The Eastern District Council was one of the largest District Councils in Hong Kong and the largest on Hong Kong Island, now the largest District Council replace status in the Kwun Tong District Council . Compared to the continuing shrinking in size of the Wan Chai District Council, the government in 2015 decided to transfer Tin Hau and Victoria Park constituencies from the Eastern to the Wan Chai District Council.

Many older political organisations, especially the Reform Club of Hong Kong had a long presence in the Eastern District. In the 1985 election, an electoral coalition of 12 incumbents based on personal network surrounding Kwan Lim-ho of the Reform Club, contested in the election, winning 10 seats in total. The traditional leftists through the Hong Kong Federation of Trade Unions (FTU) also had considerable influence in their traditional stronghold of North Point and passed on its influence to the Democratic Alliance for the Betterment of Hong Kong (DAB) formed in 1992 and gradually expanded to the public estate areas in Shau Kei Wan and Chai Wan, while the influence of the pro-democrats, represented by the Democratic Party and the Civic Party today, was mostly limited to certain areas of private apartments such as Tai Koo Shing and Sai Wan Ho.

The pro-democrats achieved the majority of the council for the first time in the 2019 election in a historic landslide victory amid the pro-democracy protests, taking 32 of the 35 seats in the council, with many of the pro-Beijing strongholds in North Point fell into the hand of pro-democracy independents. The Civic Party emerged as the largest party with five seats which saw its veteran councillor Joseph Lai took the chairmanship.

== Political control ==
Since 1982 political control of the council has been held by the following parties:

Camp in control	Largest party	Years	Composition
No Overall Control	Reform Club	1982 - 1985	
Pro-government	Reform Club	1985 - 1988	
Pro-government	HKAS	1988 - 1991	
Pro-government	United Democrats	1991 - 1994	
Pro-Beijing	DAB	1994 - 1997	
Pro-Beijing	DAB	1997 - 1999	
Pro-Beijing	DAB	2000 - 2003	
Pro-Beijing	DAB	2004 - 2007	
Pro-Beijing	DAB	2008 - 2011	
Pro-Beijing	DAB	2012 - 2015	
Pro-Beijing	DAB	2016 - 2019	
Pro-democracy → NOC	Civic → None	2020 - 2023	
Pro-Beijing	DAB	2024 - 2027	

== Political makeup ==
Elections are held every four years.

Political party	Council members											
Political party	1982	1985	1988	1991	1994	1999	2003	2007	2011	2015	2019	2023
DAB					9	13	12	14	16	10	1	3
FTU			1	1					1	6	1	2
Liberal					3	2	1	2	2	2	1	1
Independent	8	8	14	14	16	12	17	14	12	10	18	8
Civic								2	3	4	5	
Democratic					4	6	6	3	2	2	4	
Labour										1	2	
LSD								2			1	
SKWEF											1	
HTTHECG											1	
NPP									1			
HKPA						1	1					
Citizens						1						
HKDF				2	2	1						
Frontier						1						
United Democrats				3								
Civic	1	3	2	2								
LDF				2								
PHKS		1	2									
HKAS		1	2									
Reform	1	5	1									
Total elected members	10	18	22	24	34	37	37	37	37	35	35	6
Other members	13	12	15	12	0	9	9	9	6	0	0	24

1994

1999

2003

2007

2011

2015

2019

== Members represented ==
Capacity	Code	Constituency	Name	Political affiliation	Term		Notes
Elected	C01	Tai Pak	Eddie Ting Ko-ho	DAB	1 January 2024	Incumbent	
Elected	C01	Tai Pak	Kenny Yuen Kin-chung	Liberal	1 January 2024	Incumbent	
Elected	C02	Hong Wan	Annie Lee Ching-har	DAB	1 January 2024	Incumbent	
Elected	C02	Hong Wan	Ng Ching-ching	FTU	1 January 2024	Incumbent	
Elected	C03	Chai Wan	Elaine Chik Kit-ling	DAB	1 January 2024	Incumbent	
Elected	C03	Chai Wan	Stanley Ho Ngai-kam	FTU	1 January 2024	Incumbent	
District Committees			Wong Chi-chung	DAB	1 January 2024	Incumbent	
District Committees			Lam Wing-shing	DAB	1 January 2024	Incumbent	
District Committees			Hung Chi-kit	DAB	1 January 2024	Incumbent	
District Committees			Kwok Wing-kin	DAB	1 January 2024	Incumbent	
District Committees			Joseph Chan Hoi-wing	DAB	1 January 2024	Incumbent	
District Committees			Lau Suk-yin	DAB	1 January 2024	Incumbent	
District Committees			Dana Lau Shing-she	NPP	1 January 2024	Incumbent	
District Committees			Tsang Cheuk-yi	Liberal	1 January 2024	Incumbent	
District Committees			Lam Wing-cheung	Independent	1 January 2024	Incumbent	
District Committees			Lin Caiying	Independent	1 January 2024	Incumbent	
District Committees			Hung Chiu-kwan	Independent	1 January 2024	Incumbent	
District Committees			Lai Nuen-san	Independent	1 January 2024	Incumbent	
Appointed			Lam Sum-lim	DAB	1 January 2024	Incumbent	
Appointed			Hung Lin-cham	DAB	1 January 2024	Incumbent	
Appointed			Cheng Chi-sing	DAB	1 January 2024	Incumbent	
Appointed			Lau Hing-yeung	DAB	1 January 2024	Incumbent	
Appointed			Liang Li	FTU	1 January 2024	Incumbent	
Appointed			Anthony Lu Xiaofeng	NPP	1 January 2024	Incumbent	
Appointed			Calvin Kwok Ho-king	NPP	1 January 2024	Incumbent	
Appointed			Kacee Ting Wong	BPA	1 January 2024	Incumbent	
Appointed			Zareenah Ho	Independent	1 January 2024	Incumbent	
Appointed			Li Lee	Independent	1 January 2024	Incumbent	
Appointed			Benny Chau Chi-yan	Independent	1 January 2024	Incumbent	
Appointed			Chan Hang	Independent	1 January 2024	Incumbent	

== Leadership ==
=== Chairs ===
Between 1985 and 2023, the chairman is elected by all the members of the council.

Chairman	Years	Political Affiliation
Charles Gately	1981–1982	District Officer
Lui Hau-tuen	1982–1985	District Officer
Shum Choi-sang	1985–1994	Independent
Chan Bing-woon	1994–1999	Independent
Christina Ting Yuk-chee	2000–2011	Independent
Christopher Chung Shu-kun	2012	DAB
Wong Kin-pan	2012–2019	DAB
Joseph Lai Chi-keong	2020–2021	Civic
Leung Wing-sze	2021-2023	Independent
Simon Chan Sheung-man	2024–present	District Officer

=== Vice Chairs ===
Vice Chairman	Years	Political Affiliation
Christopher Chung Shu-kun	2000–2003	DAB
Wong Kwok-hing	2004–2007	DAB
Christopher Chung Shu-kun	2008–2011	DAB
Wong Kin-pan	2012	DAB
Kung Pak-cheung	2012–2015	DAB
Chiu Chi-keung	2016–2019	FTU
Andrew Chiu Ka-yin	2020–2021	Democratic
