= Hong Kong Island (1998 constituency) =

Geographical constituency in Hong Kong

Coordinates: 22°15′52″N 114°11′14″E

- Former Geographical constituency for the Legislative Council of Hong Kong
- Boundary of Hong Kong Island in Hong Kong
- District: Central and Western District; Wan Chai District; Eastern District; Southern District
- Region: Hong Kong Island
- Population: 1,232,700 (2020)
- Electorate: 707,277 (2020)

Former constituency
- Created: 1998
- Abolished: 2021
- Number of members: Four (1998–2000); Five (2000–2004); Six (2004–2012); Seven (2012–2016); Six (2016–2021)
- Created from: Hong Kong Island Central, Hong Kong Island West (1995), Hong Kong Island South, Hong Kong Island East (1995)
- Replaced by: Hong Kong Island West (2021), Hong Kong Island East (2021)

The Hong Kong Island geographical constituency was one of the five geographical constituencies in the elections for the Legislative Council of Hong Kong from 1998 to 2021. It was established in 1998 for the first SAR Legislative Council election and was abolished under the 2021 overhaul of the Hong Kong electoral system. In the 2016 Legislative Council election, it elected six members of the Legislative Council using the Hare quota of party-list proportional representation. The constituency covered all the four districts on the Hong Kong Island, namely, Central and Western, Eastern, Southern and Wan Chai. In 2020, it had 707,277 registered voters.

== History ==
The single-constituency single-vote system was replaced by the party-list proportional representation system for the first SAR Legislative Council election designed by Beijing to reward the weaker pro-Beijing candidates and dilute the electoral strength of the majority pro-democrats. Four seats were allocated to Hong Kong Island consisting the districts of Central and Western, Wan Chai, Eastern and Southern in 1998. The pro-Beijing Democratic Alliance for the Betterment of Hong Kong (DAB) managed to win a seat with nearly 30 per cent of the total votes as a result, while the rest were taken by the pro-democrats.

In the 2000 Legislative Council election, the DAB gained one more seat with Choy So-yuk who had a strong base in the Hokkien community in North Point when an extra seat was added to the constituency, while Cyd Ho who ran in the New Territories East replaced Christine Loh who retired. However, DAB candidate Cheng Kai-nam soon gave up his seat after the election due to corruption allegations. The vacancy was taken up by pro-democracy nonpartisan barrister Audrey Eu in the 2000 Hong Kong Island by-election.

In the 2004 Legislative Council election, Legislative Council President Rita Fan ran in Hong Kong Island when the number of the seats in the constituency increased to six seats and the Election Committee constituency was abolished. The pro-democrats launched the "1+1=4" strategy, aiming at winning two seats with each of the two tickets. However, the last minute emergency call by Martin Lee proved to a miscalculation, with his Democratic Party ticket receiving more votes than he needed, at the expense of the Eu–Ho ticket where Cyd Ho narrowly defeated by DAB's Choy So-yuk with 815 votes, less than 0.5 per cent of the vote share

DAB chairman Ma Lik's death in 2007 triggered the 2007 Hong Kong Island by-election, where the pro-democracy and pro-Beijing camps each fielded former senior government officials against each other. Former Chief Secretary for Administration Anson Chan won the crowded-fielded pro-democracy primary, while former Secretary for Security Regina Ip who was the face of the 2003 Basic Law Article 23 legislation was supported by the pro-Beijing parties. Receiving wide attention, Anson Chan eventually beat Regina Ip with 55–43 vote share.

The 2008 Legislative Council election saw veteran Democrats Martin Lee and Yeung Sum both stepping down from their offices, and were succeeded by veteran District Councillor Kam Nai-wai. The Democrats' dominance was eclipsed by the newly established Civic Party with Audrey Eu and Tanya Chan ticket who topped the popular votes. Former DAB chairman Jasper Tsang also switched from Kowloon West to Hong Kong Island and was later on elected the Legislative Council President, succeeding retiring Rita Fan. Regina Ip who was defeated less than a year ago also won a seat, while Cyd Ho made a comeback by regaining a seat. Over the 2012 constitutional reform package, the Civic Party launched the "Five Constituencies Referendum" and which each legislator of the five geographical constituencies resigned to trigger a de facto referendum on the reform proposal. Tanya Chan resigned from the office in January 2010 and re-elected in the May by-election with a low turnout due to the government and pro-Beijing boycott of the poll.

The deal on the modified constitutional reform proposal struck by the moderate democrats and the Beijing authorities expanded the number of the geographical constituency seats from 30 to 35, where the seats in Hong Kong Island were increased to seven. To win an extra seat, the DAB launched an offensive strategy by splitting its ticket into two, led by Jasper Tsang and Christopher Cheung respectively. While its sister organisation Hong Kong Federation of Trade Unions (FTU) also fielded its ticket for the first time, led by veteran legislator Wong Kwok-hing. Civic Party's strategy of fielding a ticket consisting of Chan Ka-lok and Tanya Chan, hoping to win two seats with one ticket with Tanya Chan boosting the vote as a second candidate eventually failed, which split the pro-democracy votes with the radical People Power and benefited Wong Kwok-hing, while former legislator Sin Chung-kai retained a seat for the Democrats. The pro-Beijing camp as a result gained the majority of the seats for the first time with four seats against pro-democrats' three.

The constituency was reduced to six seats in the 2016 Legislative Council election due to the reapportionment. The seats were even split between the pro-democracy and pro-Beijing camps. Localist camp Demosistō chairman Nathan Law which gained his fame in the 2014 Occupy protests was elected alongside Tanya Chan of the Civic Party and Hui Chi-fung of the Democratic Party. While veteran Regina Ip of the New People's Party was re-elected with newly elected DAB's Horace Cheung and FTU's Kwok Wai-keung. Nathan Law was later disqualified from the office in July 2017 over this oath-taking manner. The vacancy was narrowly won by former Democrat Au Nok-hin in the 2018 Hong Kong Island by-election after Demosistō's Agnes Chow was barred from running. Au was later unseated by the court in December 2019, as the court viewed Chow's disqualification was unlawful.

== Return members ==
Below are all the members since the creation of the Hong Kong Island constituency. The number of seats allocated to Hong Kong Island has been increased from four to six between 1998 and 2016 due to the enlargement.

LegCo members for Hong Kong Island, 1998–2021
Term	Election	Member	Member	Member	Member	Member	Member	Member
1st	1998	Martin Lee (DP)	Cheng Kai-nam (DAB)	Yeung Sum (DP)	Christine Loh (CP)			
2nd	2000	Martin Lee (DP)	Cheng Kai-nam (DAB)	Yeung Sum (DP)	Cyd Ho (TF)	Choy So-yuk (DAB)		
2nd	2000 (b)	Martin Lee (DP)	Audrey Eu (Ind→A45→CP)	Yeung Sum (DP)	Cyd Ho (TF)	Choy So-yuk (DAB)		
3rd	2004	Martin Lee (DP)	Audrey Eu (Ind→A45→CP)	Yeung Sum (DP)	Ma Lik (DAB)	Choy So-yuk (DAB)	Rita Fan (Ind)	
3rd	2007 (b)	Martin Lee (DP)	Audrey Eu (Ind→A45→CP)	Yeung Sum (DP)	Anson Chan (Ind)	Choy So-yuk (DAB)	Rita Fan (Ind)	
4th	2008	Tanya Chan (CP)	Audrey Eu (Ind→A45→CP)	Kam Nai-wai (DP)	Cyd Ho (CAU→Lab/CAU)	Jasper Tsang (DAB)	Regina Ip (Ind→NPP)	
4th	2008	Vacant	Audrey Eu (Ind→A45→CP)	Kam Nai-wai (DP)	Cyd Ho (CAU→Lab/CAU)	Jasper Tsang (DAB)	Regina Ip (Ind→NPP)	
4th	2010 (b)	Tanya Chan (CP)	Audrey Eu (Ind→A45→CP)	Kam Nai-wai (DP)	Cyd Ho (CAU→Lab/CAU)	Jasper Tsang (DAB)	Regina Ip (Ind→NPP)	
5th	2012	Chan Ka-lok (CP)	Christopher Chung (DAB)	Sin Chung-kai (DP)	Cyd Ho (CAU→Lab/CAU)	Jasper Tsang (DAB)	Regina Ip (Ind→NPP)	Wong Kwok-hing (FTU)
6th	2016	Tanya Chan (CP→Ind)	Horace Cheung (DAB)	Hui Chi-fung (DP)	Nathan Law (Demosistō)	Kwok Wai-keung (FTU)	Regina Ip (Ind→NPP)	Seat abolished
6th	2018 (b)	Tanya Chan (CP→Ind)	Horace Cheung (DAB)	Hui Chi-fung (DP)	Au Nok-hin (Ind)	Kwok Wai-keung (FTU)	Regina Ip (Ind→NPP)	Seat abolished
6th	2018 (b)	Tanya Chan (CP→Ind)	Horace Cheung (DAB)	Hui Chi-fung (DP)	Vacant	Kwok Wai-keung (FTU)	Regina Ip (Ind→NPP)	Seat abolished
6th	2018 (b)	Vacant	Horace Cheung (DAB)	Hui Chi-fung (DP)	Vacant	Kwok Wai-keung (FTU)	Regina Ip (Ind→NPP)	Seat abolished
6th	2018 (b)	Vacant	Horace Cheung (DAB)	Vacant	Vacant	Kwok Wai-keung (FTU)	Regina Ip (Ind→NPP)	Seat abolished

=== Summary of seats won ===
Term	Election	Distribution
1st	1998	3 / 1
2nd	2000	3 / 2
3rd	2004	3 / 3
4th	2008	4 / 2
5th	2012	3 / 4
6th	2016	3 / 3

	1998	2000	2004	2008	2012	2016
Democratic	2	2	2	1	1	1
DAB	1	2	2	1	2	1
Citizens	1					
Frontier		1				
Civic				2	1	1
Civic Act-up				1		
Labour					1	
NPP					1	1
FTU					1	1
Demosisto						1
Independent			2	1		
Pro-democracy	3	3	3	4	3	3
Pro-Beijing	1	2	3	2	4	3
Seats	4	5	6	6	7	6

=== Vote share summary ===
	1998	2000	2004	2008	2012	2016
Democratic	46.8	35.3	37.2	12.7	12.3	11.3
DAB	29.3	27.8	21.1	19.3	21.3	10.9
Citizens	12.8					
Liberal	2.4			0.7	5.4	
Frontier		10.0	10.4			
New Forum		5.5				
Civic				26.4	21.3	9.4
Civic Act-up				9.9		
LSD				3.3	1.0	
Labour					9.5	5.2
NPP					9.2	16.1
FTU					8.3	12.2
People Power					5.6	1.9
Demosisto						13.5
Civic Passion						6.0
Path of Democracy						2.6
Independent	8.7	21.4	31.3	27.9	6.2	10.8
Pro-democracy	59.5	49.1	59.6	60.1	49.8	48.1
Pro-Beijing	36.2	38.9	39.6	39.5	45.0	40.0

== Election results ==
The constituency was set up in 1998 election when the largest remainder method (with Hare quota) of the proportional representative electoral system was introduced, replacing four single-member constituencies of the 1995 election. 4, 5, 6, and 7 members were returned from this constituency in the 1998, 2000, 2004 and 2012 elections respectively. No change of boundary had been made throughout since 1998.

=== 2010s ===
2018 Hong Kong Island by-election
Party	Candidate	Votes	%	±%
Independent	Au Nok-hin	137,181	50.70	
NPP	Judy Kapui Chan	127,634	47.17	
Nonpartisan	Edward Yum Liang-hsien	3,580	1.32	
Nonpartisan	Ng Dick-hay	2,202	0.81	
Majority		9,547	3.53	
Total valid votes		270,597	100.00	
Rejected ballots		2,377		
Turnout		272,974	43.80	
Registered electors		623,273		
Independent gain from Demosisto		Swing		

↓
1	1	1	1	1	1

Vote share
1. NPP (16.1%)
2. Demosisto (13.5%)
3. FTU (12.2%)
4. Democratic (11.3%)
5. DAB (10.9%)
6. Civic (9.40%)
7. Civic Passion (5.99%)
8. Labour (5.15%)
9. Path of Democracy (2.66%)
10. People Power (1.93%)
11. Other (10.8%)

2016 Legislative Council election: Hong Kong Island
List	Candidates	Votes	Of total (%)	± from prev.
Quota		62,763	16.67	
NPP	Regina Ip Lau Suk-yee Judy Chan Ka-pui, Joey Lee Man-lung, Marcus Tse Tsz-kei, Larry Hung Lung-chuen, Gigi Wong Ching-chi	60,760	16.13	+6.97
Demosisto	Nathan Law Kwun-chung	50,818	13.49	N/A
FTU	Kwok Wai-keung Ng Chau-pei, Stanely Ho Ngai-kam, Lui Hung-pan, Chan Wing-yan	45,925	12.20	+3.94
Democratic	Hui Chi-fung Sin Chung-kai	42,499	11.29	–0.97
DAB	Cheung Kwok-kwan Christopher Chung Shu-kun, Jacqueline Chung Ka-man, Ada Mak Tse How-ling, Eddie Ting Kong-ho, Dominic Wong Chi-chung	41,152	10.93	–11.66
Civic	Tanya Chan Cheng Tat-hung	35,404	9.40	–11.91
Nonpartisan	Ricky Wong Wai-kay	33,323	8.85	N/A
Civic Passion	Cheng Kam-mun, Bonix Chung Yuen-wun	22,555	5.99	N/A
Labour	Cyd Ho Sau-lan, Mak Tak-ching, Cheng Sze-lut	19,376	5.15	–4.38
PoD	Gary Wong Chi-him	10,028	2.66	N/A
People Power	Christopher Lau Gar-hung, Erica Yuen Mi-ming	7,276	1.93	–3.71
Nonpartisan	Chim Pui-chung	2,587	0.69	N/A
Ind. democrat	Paulus Johannes Zimmerman	2,550	0.68	N/A
Nonpartisan	Shum Chee-chiu	1,654	0.44	N/A
Nonpartisan	Chui Chi-kin	670	0.18	N/A
Total valid votes		376,577	100.00	
Rejected ballots		4,753		
Turnout		381,330	60.74	+5.61
Registered electors		627,804		

↓
1	1	1	1	2	1

Vote share
1. Civic (21.3%)
2. DAB (21.3%)
3. Democratic (12.3%)
4. Labour (9.53%)
5. NPP (9.16%)
6. FTU (8.26%)
7. People Power (5.64%)
8. Liberal (5.35%)
9. LSD (0.96%)
10. Other (6.24%)

2012 Legislative Council election: Hong Kong Island
List	Candidates	Votes	Of total (%)	± from prev.
Quota		47,252	14.29	
Civic	Chan Ka-lok Tanya Chan	70,475	21.31 (14.29+7.02)	−5.09
Democratic	Sin Chung-kai Yeung Sum, Chai Man-hon, Cheng Lai-king, Leung Suk-ching, Hui Chi-fung	40,558	12.26	−0.44
DAB	Jasper Tsang Yok-sing	36,517	11.04	−8.26
DAB	Christopher Chung Shu-kun Eddie Ting Kong-ho, Jennifer Chow Kit-bing, Kung Pak-cheung, Ngan Chun-lim, Kenny Lee Kwun-yee, Cheng Chi-sing	33,901	10.25	N/A
Labour	Cyd Ho Sau-lan Cheng Sze-lut, Chung Chung-fai	31,523	9.53	−0.37
NPP	Regina Ip Lau Suk-yee Wong Chor-fung, Tse Tsz-kei	30,289	9.16	−10.34
FTU	Wong Kwok-hing Pan Pey-chyou, Chu Ting-lok, Stanley Ho Ngai-kam, Chan Chi-hang	27,336	8.26	N/A
People Power	Christopher Lau Gar-hung, Shiu Yeuk-yuen, Jeff Au Yeung Ying-kit	18,667	5.64	N/A
Liberal	Miriam Lau Kin-yee, Shiu Ka-fai, Lee Chun-keung	17,686	5.35	+4.65
Independent	Lo Wing-lok	16,900	5.11	−1.39
LSD	Avery Ng Man-yuen	3,169	0.96	−2.34
Nonpartisan	Hui Ching-on	2,980	0.90	N/A
Independent	Ng Wing-chun	422	0.13	N/A
Nonpartisan	Ho Kar-tai	343	0.10	N/A
Total valid votes		330,766	100.00	
Rejected ballots		3,666		
Turnout		334,432	55.13	+9.12
Registered electors		606,678		

2010 Hong Kong Island by-election
Party	Candidate	Votes	%	±%
Civic	Tanya Chan	103,564	94.97	
Nonpartisan	Tai Cheuk-yin	3,144	2.88	
Tertiary 2012	Leung Wing-ho	2,715	2.49	
Nonpartisan	Lee Chun-hung	1,542	1.41	
Nonpartisan	Wong Hing	799	0.73	
Majority		100,420	92.09	
Total valid votes		111,764	100.00	
Rejected ballots		3,409		
Turnout		115,173	18.49	
Registered electors		622,756		
Civic hold		Swing		

=== 2000s ===

↓
1	2	1	1	1

Vote share
1. Civic (26.4%)
2. DAB (19.3%)
3. Democratic (12.7%)
4. Civic Act-up (9.90%)
5. LSD (3.30%)
6. Liberal (0.70%)
7. Other (27.7%)

2008 Legislative Council election: Hong Kong Island
List	Candidates	Votes	Of total (%)	± from prev.
Quota		52,238	16.67	
Civic	Tanya Chan, Audrey Eu Yuet-mee Amy Yung Wing-sheung	82,600	26.35 (16.67+9.68)	N/A
Independent	Regina Ip Lau Suk-yee Louis Shih Tai-cho, Wong Kin-hing, Ronald Chan Ngok-pang	61,073	19.48 (16.67+2.82)	N/A
DAB	Jasper Tsang Yok-sing Choy So-yuk, Christopher Chung Shu-kun, Cheung Kwok-kwan, Chan Hok-fung, Kwok Wai-keung	60,417	19.28 (16.67+2.61)	−1.80
Democratic	Kam Nai-wai Yeung Sum, Tsui Yuen-wa	39,808	12.70	−24.52
Civic Act-up	Cyd Ho Sau-lan	30,887	9.85	N/A
Independent	Lo Wing-lok	20,523	6.55	N/A
LSD	Tsang Kin-shing	10,202	3.25	+1.75
Ind. democrat	Joseph Lai Chi-keong	3,955	1.26	N/A
Liberal	Lam Chui-lin, Wong Kam-chuen, Ngan Choi-chik	2,166	0.69	N/A
Nonpartisan	Myra Sophia Siu Man-wa	1,798	0.57	N/A
Total valid votes		313,429	100.00	
Rejected ballots		1,441		
Turnout		314,870	50.17	−7.45
Registered electors		627,657		

2007 Hong Kong Island by-election
Party	Candidate	Votes	%	±%
Nonpartisan	Anson Chan Fang	175,874	54.84	
Nonpartisan	Regina Ip Lau Suk-yee	137,550	42.89	
Nonpartisan	Tandon Lai Chiang	3,518	1.10	
Nonpartisan	Ho Loy	1,593	0.50	
Nonpartisan	Ling Wai-wan	822	0.19	
Nonpartisan	Siu See-kong	613	0.19	
Nonpartisan	Lee Wing-kin	401	0.12	
Nonpartisan	Lau Yuk-shing	344	0.11	
Majority		38,324	11.95	
Total valid votes		320,715	100.00	
Rejected ballots		1,223		
Turnout		321,938	52.06	
Registered electors		618,398		
Nonpartisan gain from DAB		Swing		

↓
2	2	2

Vote share
1. Democratic (37.2%)
2. DAB (21.1%)
3. Other (41.7%)

2004 Legislative Council election: Hong Kong Island
List	Candidates	Votes	Of total (%)	± from prev.
Quota		59,016	16.67	
Democratic	Yeung Sum, Martin Lee Chu-ming Joseph Lai Chi-keong	131,788	37.22 (16.67+16.67+3.88)	+1.91
DAB	Ma Lik, Choy So-yuk Christopher Chung Shu-kun, Yeung Wai-foon, Lee Yuen-kwong, Cheung Kwok-kwan	74,659	21.08 (16.67+4.42)	−6.77
Independent (Frontier)	Audrey Eu Yuet-mee Cyd Ho Sau-lan	73,844	20.85 (16.67+4.15)	N/A
Nonpartisan	Rita Fan Hsu Lai-tai	65,661	18.54	N/A
Grass-root pro-democrats	Tsang Kin-shing, Chung Chung-fai, Tang Chui-chung	5,313	1.50	−2.29
Nonpartisan	Kelvin Wong Kam-fai	2,830	0.80	N/A
Total valid votes		354,095	100.00	
Rejected ballots		2,270		
Turnout		356,365	57.62	+15.59
Registered electors		618,451		

2000 Hong Kong Island by-election
Party	Candidate	Votes	%	±%
Independent	Audrey Eu Yuet-mee	108,401	52.11	
DAB	Christopher Chung Shu-kun	78,282	37.23	
Independent	Jennifer Chow Kit-bing	13,717	6.59	
Independent	Paul Tse Wai-chun	5,076	0.50	
Independent	Simon Lo Ching-cheung	1,317	0.25	
Independent	Shi Kai-biu	1,231	0.19	
Majority		30,119	17.61	
Total valid votes		208,024	100.00	
Rejected ballots		648		
Turnout		208,672	33.27	
Registered electors		627,208		
Independent gain from DAB		Swing		

↓
1	2	2

Vote share
1. Democratic (35.3%)
2. DAB (27.8%)
3. Frontier (10.0%)
4. New Forum (5.50%)
5. Other (21.4%)

2000 Legislative Council election: Hong Kong Island
List	Candidates	Votes	Of total (%)	± from prev.
Quota		52,158	20.00	
Democratic	Martin Lee Chu-ming, Yeung Sum Kam Nai-wai, Joseph Lai Chi-keong, Cheng Lai-king	92,074	35.31 (20.00+15.31)	−11.46
DAB	Cheng Kai-nam, Choy So-yuk Suen Kai-cheong, Christopher Chung Shu-kun, Yeung Wai-foon	72,617	27.85 (20.00+7.85)	−1.52
Frontier	Cyd Ho Sau-lan	25,988	9.97	N/A
Nonpartisan	Fung Leung-lo	15,419	5.91	N/A
Nonpartisan	Jennifer Chow Kit-bing	14,534	5.57	+2.04
New Forum	David Lan Hong-tsung, Fung Ho-keung, Chan Choi-hi, Regina Yeung Sum-yu	14,329	5.49	N/A
Ind. democrat	Tsang Kin-shing, Manuel Chan Tim-shing, Steve Chan Kwok-leung	9,896	3.79	N/A
Nonpartisan	Angel Leung On-kay	6,967	2.67	N/A
Nonpartisan	Paul Tse Wai-chun	6,398	2.45	N/A
Nonpartisan	Allen Yung Chan-lung	1,434	0.55	N/A
Nonpartisan	Andrew Shuen Pak-man	1,132	0.43	N/A
Total valid votes		260,788	100.00	
Rejected ballots		2,776		
Turnout		263,564	42.03	−9.93
Registered electors		618,451		

=== 1990s ===
↓
1	2	1

Vote share
1. Democratic (46.8%)
2. DAB (29.3%)
3. Citizens (12.8%)
4. Liberal (2.40%)
5. Other (8.70%)

1998 Legislative Council election: Hong Kong Island
List	Candidates	Votes	Of total (%)	± from prev.
Quota		76,903	25.00	
Democratic	Martin Lee Chu-ming, Yeung Sum Yuen Bun-keung, Chan Kwok-leung	143,843	46.76 (25.00+21.76)	
DAB	Cheng Kai-nam Ip Kwok-him, Suen Kai-cheong, Christopher Chung Shu-kun	90,182	29.32 (25.00+4.32)	
Citizens	Christine Loh Kung-wai	39,251	12.76	
Independent	Chong Chan-yau	12,377	4.02	
Nonpartisan	Jennifer Chow Kit-bing	10,950	3.56	
Liberal	Ada Wong Ying-kay, Alice Tso Shing-yuk, Alice Lam Chui-lin	7,845	2.43	
Nonpartisan	Louis Leung Wing-on	2,588	0.84	
Independent	Li Hung	935	0.30	
Total valid votes		307,611	100.00	
Rejected ballots		2,203		
Turnout		309,814	51.96	
Registered electors		596,245		
