= 2003 Central and Western District Council election =

Hong Kong local election

- 23 November 2003

15 (of the 19) seats to Central and Western District Council 10 seats needed for a majority
- Turnout: 43.5%
	First party	Second party	Third party
Party	Democratic	CWDP	Liberal
Last election	5 seats, 40.9%	New party	1 seat, 2.9%
Seats before	5	2	2
Seats won	6	2	2
Seat change	▲1	Steady	Steady
Popular vote	9,840	5,748	672
Percentage	28.7%	16.7%	2.0%
Swing	▼12.2%	N/A	▼0.9%
	Fourth party	Fifth party
Party	DAB	Frontier
Last election	3 seats, 33.4%	Did not run
Seats before	3	0
Seats won	1	1
Seat change	▼2	▲1
Popular vote	8,649	3,123
Percentage	25.2%	9.1%
Swing	▼8.2%	N/A
- Colours on map indicate winning party for each constituency.

The 2003 Central and Western District Council election was held on 23 November 2003 to elect all 15 elected members to the 19-member District Council. The pro-democracy camp won a majority of the seats where The Frontier/Civic Act-up legislator Cyd Ho Sau-lan defeated the incumbent Ip Kwok-him of the Democratic Alliance for the Betterment of Hong Kong, who was also a legislator, in Kwun Lung. The majority of the pro-democrats was balanced by 4 appointed members selected by the Chief Executive.

== Overall election results ==
Before election:

↓
7	8
Pro-democracy	Pro-Beijing

Change in composition:

↓
9	6
Pro-democracy	Pro-Beijing

Central and Western District Council election result 2003
Party	Seats	Gains	Losses	Net gain/loss	Seats %	Votes %	Votes	+/−
Democratic	6	1	0	+1	40.0	28.7	9,840	–12.2
DAB	1	0	–2	–2	6.7	25.2	8,649	–8.2
Independent	3	0	0	0	20.0	18.4	6,307	
CWDP	2	0	0	0	13.3	16.7	5,748	
Frontier	1	1	0	+1	6.7	9.1	3,123	
Liberal	2	0	0	0	6.7	2.0	672	–0.9

== Results by constituency ==
=== Belcher ===
Belcher
Party	Candidate	Votes	%	±%
Democratic	Victor Yeung Sui-yin	1,937	45.3	
DAB	Wong Chit-man	1,497	35.0	−17.2
Independent	Lam Kee-shing	841	19.7	−28.1
Majority		440	10.3	+5.9
Democratic gain from DAB		Swing	+5.2	

=== Castle Road ===
Castle Road
Party	Candidate	Votes	%	±%
Democratic	Cheng Lai-king	1,625	73.6	+2.0
Independent	Chong Wai-por	584	26.4	N/A
Majority		1,041	47.2	+4.0
Democratic hold		Swing		

=== Centre Street ===
Centre Street
Party	Candidate	Votes	%	±%
Democratic	Henry Leung Yiu-cho	1,693	66.0	+7.0
DAB	Lau Yeung-fun	750	29.2	−11.8
Independent	So Lai-yung	124	24.8	
Majority		943	36.8	+18.8
Democratic hold		Swing		

=== Chung Wan ===
Chung Wan
Party	Candidate	Votes	%	±%
Democratic	Yuen Bun-keung	1,481	69.5	+1.2
DAB	Lee Wai-keung	650	30.5	−1.2
Majority		831	39	+3.3
Democratic hold		Swing		

=== Kennedy Town & Mount Davis ===
Kennedy Town & Mount Davis
Party	Candidate	Votes	%	±%
DAB	Yeung Wai-foon	1,241	50.1	−2.9
Independent	Winfield Chong Wing-fai	1,234	49.9	+2.9
Majority		7	0.2	−5.8
DAB hold		Swing	-2.9	

=== Kwun Lung ===
Kwun Lung
Party	Candidate	Votes	%	±%
Frontier (Civic Act-up)	Cyd Ho Sau-lan	1,869	50.9	N/A
DAB	Ip Kwok-him	1,805	49.1	−8.5
Majority		64	0.8	−14.4
Frontier gain from DAB		Swing		

=== Middle Levels East ===
Mid Levels East
Party	Candidate	Votes	%	±%
CWDP	Kwok Ka-ki	1,624	57.8	+2.0
Independent	Jackie Cheung Yick-hung	1,186	42.2	N/A
Majority		438	15.6	+4.0
CWDP hold		Swing	+2.0	

=== Peak ===
Peak
Party	Candidate	Votes	%	±%
Liberal	Mark Lin	672	54.1	−11.2
Independent	Louis Leung Wing-on	569	45.9	+11.2
Majority		103	8.2	−22.4
Liberal hold		Swing	-5.6	

=== Sai Wan ===
Sai Wan
Party	Candidate	Votes	%	±%
Liberal	Chan Tak-chor	Unopposed	N/A	N/A
Liberal hold		Swing	N/A	

=== Sai Ying Pun ===
Sai Ying Pun
Party	Candidate	Votes	%	±%
Independent (CWDP)	Lai Kwok-hung	1,744	53.3	+3.2
DAB	Chan Yiu-keung	1,529	46.7	−3.2
Majority		215	6.6	+6.4
Independent hold		Swing		

=== Shek Tong Tsui ===
Shek Tong Tsui
Party	Candidate	Votes	%	±%
Independent	Chan Choi-hi	1,676	59.4	+11.0
CWDP	Michael Lai Wing-kuen	1,146	40.6	N/A
Majority		530	18.8	−1.4
Independent hold		Swing		

=== Sheung Wan ===
Sheung Wan
Party	Candidate	Votes	%	±%
Democratic	Kam Nai-wai	1,756	70.7	+2.6
DAB	Chiu Wah-kuen	729	29.3	−2.6
Majority		1,027	41.4	+5.2
Democratic hold		Swing		

=== Tung Wah ===
Tung Wah
Party	Candidate	Votes	%	±%
Democratic	Frederick Ho Chun-ki	1,348	75.1	+10.3
DAB	Lee Wing-fai	448	24.9	−10.3
Majority		900	50.2	+20.6
Democratic hold		Swing		

=== University ===
University
Party	Candidate	Votes	%	±%
Independent	Stephen Chan Chit-kwai	Unopposed	N/A	N/A
Independent hold		Swing		

=== Water Street ===
Water Street
Party	Candidate	Votes	%	±%
Independent	Lesilie Spencer Tai Cheuk-yin	1,327	51.4	−1.3
Frontier	Robin Wan Joe-yiu	1,254	48.6	
Majority		67	2.8	−2.6
Independent hold		Swing		
