= 2008 Hong Kong legislative election in Hong Kong Island =

- 7 September 2008

All 6 Hong Kong Island seats to the Legislative Council
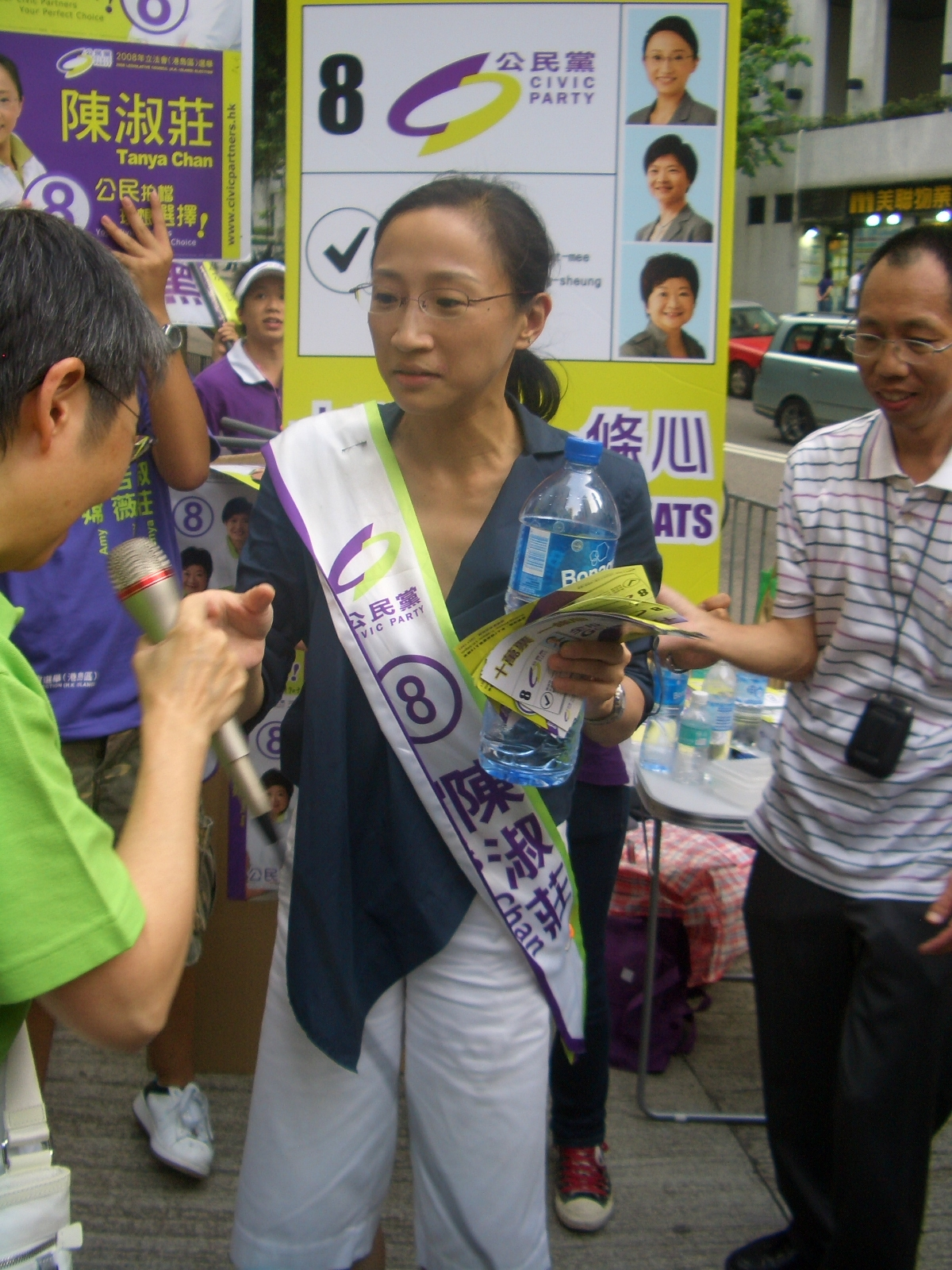

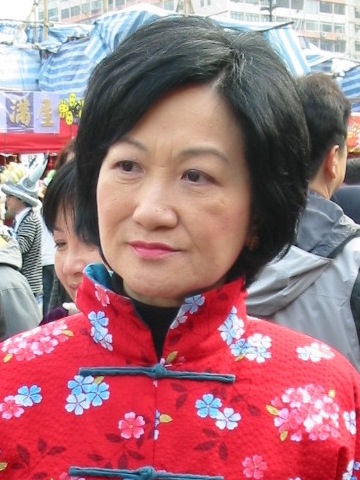

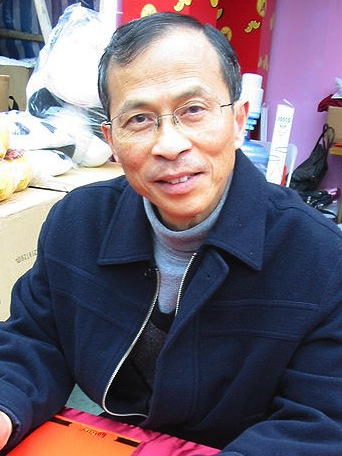

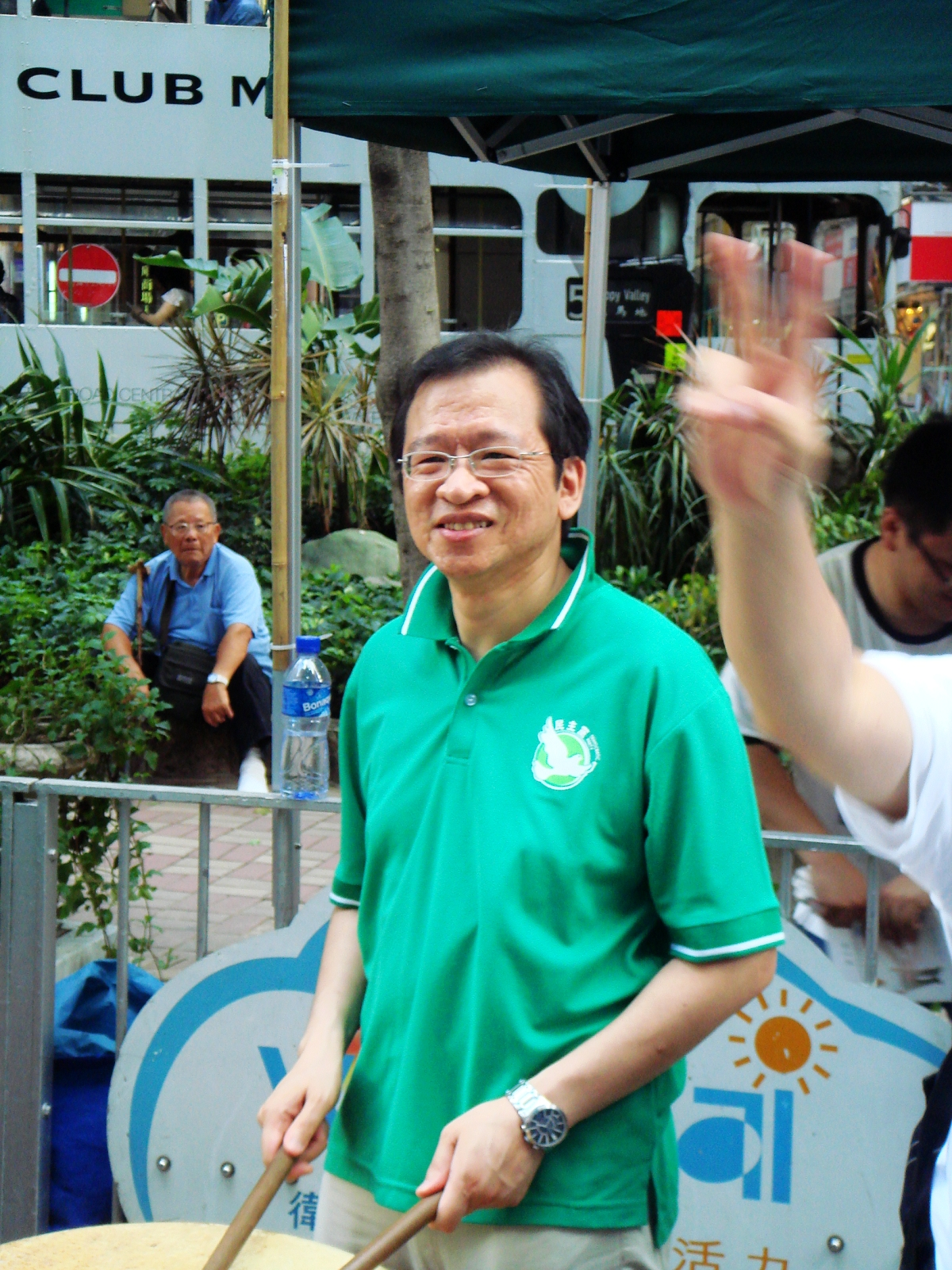

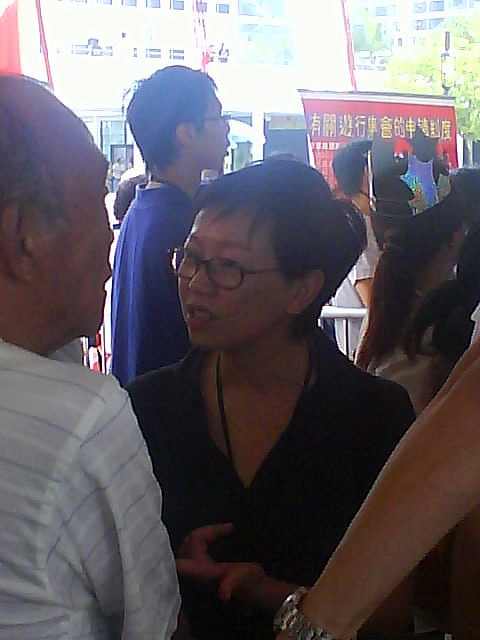
	First party	Second party	Third party
Leader	Tanya Chan	Regina Ip	Jasper Tsang
Party	Civic	Independent	DAB
Alliance	Pan-democracy	Pro-Beijing	Pro-Beijing
Last election	1 seat, 20.9%	N/A	2 seats, 21.1%
Seats before	1	0	1
Seats won	2	1	1
Seat change	▲1	▲1	Steady
Popular vote	82,600	61,073	60,417
Percentage	26.4%	19.5%	19.3%
Swing	▲5.5%	N/A	▼1.8%
	Fourth party	Fifth party
Leader	Kam Nai-wai	Cyd Ho
Party	Democratic	Civic Act-up
Alliance	Pan-democracy	Pan-democracy
Last election	2 seats, 37.2%	New party
Seats before	2	0
Seats won	1	1
Seat change	▼1	▲1
Popular vote	39,808	30,887
Percentage	12.7%	9.9%
Swing	▼24.5%	N/A
- Party with most votes in each District Council Constituency.

These are the Hong Kong Island results of the 2008 Hong Kong legislative election. The election was held on 7 September 2008 and all 6 seats in Hong Kong Island were contested. The pan-democracy camp retained four seats as compared to pro-Beijing camp's two seats, with Civic Party successfully get two candidates, newcomer Tanya Chan and Audrey Eu who stood as second candidate on their list. Pro-Beijing independent Regina Ip who lost the 2007 Hong Kong Island by-election less than a year ago, won a new seat.

== Overall results ==
Before election:

↓
4	2
Pan-democracy	Pro-Beijing

Change in composition:

↓
4	2
Pan-democracy	Pro-Beijing

Party	Seats	Seats change	Contesting list(s)	Votes	%	% change
Civic	1	+1	1	82,600	26.4	+5.5
Democratic	1	–1	1	39,808	12.7	−24.5
Civic Act-up	1	+1	1	30,887	9.9	N/A
LSD	0	0	1	10,202	3.3	N/A
Independent	0	0	2	24,478	7.8	N/A
Pro-democracy camp	4	0	6	187,975	60.0	+0.5
DAB	1	0	1	60,417	19.3	–1.8
Liberal	0	0	1	2,166	0.7	N/A
Independent	1	0	1	61,073	19.5	N/A
Pro-Beijing camp	2	0	2	123,656	39.5	–0.1
Independent	0	0	1	1,798	0.6	N/A
Turnout:				313,429	50.2	

== Candidates list ==
Legislative Election 2008: Hong Kong Island
List	Candidates	Votes	Of total (%)	± from prev.
Civic	Tanya Chan, Audrey Eu Yuet-mee Amy Yung Wing-sheung	82,600	26.4 (16.67+9.68)	N/A
Independent	Regina Ip Lau Suk-yee Louis Shih Tai-cho, Wong Kin-hing, Ronald Chan Ngok-pang	61,073	19.5 (16.67+2.82)	N/A
DAB	Jasper Tsang Yok-sing Choy So-yuk, Christopher Chung Shu-kun, Cheung Kwok-kwan, Chan Hok-fung, Kwok Wai-keung	60,417	19.3 (16.67+2.61)	−1.8
Democratic	Kam Nai-wai Yeung Sum, Tsui Yuen-wa	39,808	12.7	−24.5
Civic Act-up	Cyd Ho Sau-lan	30,887	9.9	N/A
Independent	Lo Wing-lok	20,523	6.5	N/A
LSD	Tsang Kin-shing	10,202	3.3	+1.8
Ind. democrat	Joseph Lai Chi-keong	3,955	1.3	N/A
Liberal	Lam Chui-lin, Wong Kam-chuen, Ngan Choi-chik	2,166	0.7	N/A
Nonpartisan	Myra Sophia Siu Man-wa	1,798	0.6	N/A
Total valid votes		313,429	100.00	
Rejected ballots		1,441		
Turnout		314,870	50.17	−7.45
Registered electors		627,657		

== See also ==
- Legislative Council of Hong Kong
- Hong Kong legislative elections
- 2008 Hong Kong legislative election
