= 2000 Hong Kong legislative election in Hong Kong Island =

- 10 September 2000

All 5 Hong Kong Island seats to the Legislative Council
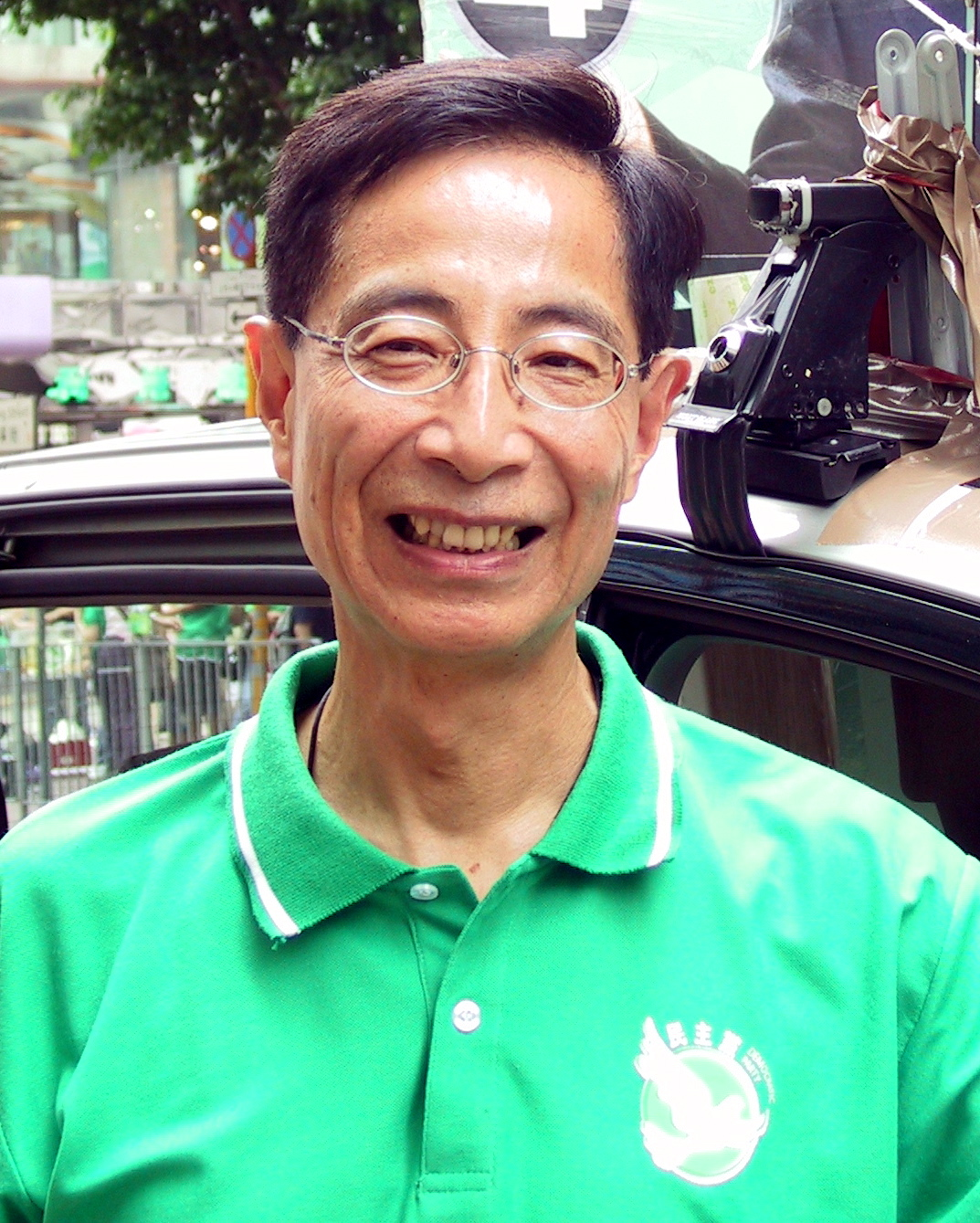

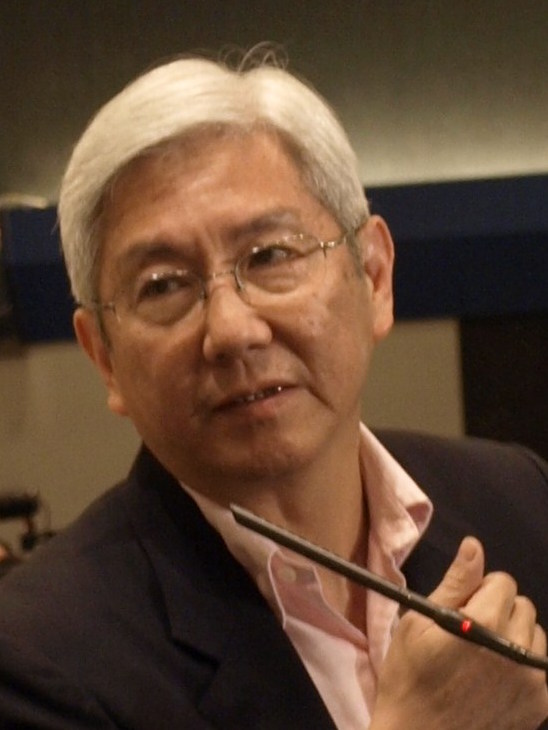

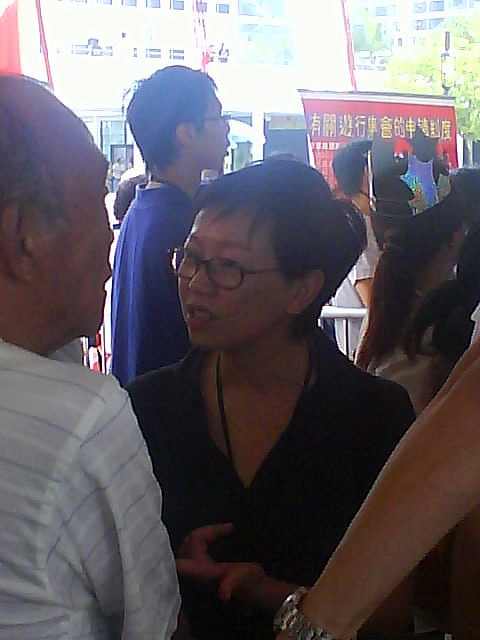
	First party	Second party	Third party
Leader	Martin Lee	Cheng Kai-nam	Cyd Ho
Party	Democratic	DAB	Frontier
Alliance	Pro-democracy camp	Pro-Beijing camp	Pro-democracy camp
Last election	2 seats, 46.8%	1 seat, 29.3%	Did not contest
Seats before	2	1	0
Seats won	2	2	1
Seat change	Steady	▲1	▲1
Popular vote	131,788	74,659	25,988
Percentage	35.3%	27.8%	10.0%
Swing	▼11.5%	▼1.5%	N/A

As part of the 2000 Hong Kong legislative election, held 10 September, all 5 seats in Hong Kong Island were contested. The Democratic Party and Democratic Alliance for the Betterment of Hong Kong (DAB) each took two seats, with Choy So-yuk taking the last seat with the largest remainder method. Cyd Ho of The Frontier who ran for the New Territories last election ran in Hong Kong Island and replaced Christine Loh of the Citizens Party who did not seek for re-election.

DAB's Cheng Kai-nam soon gave up his seat over a corruption scandal and an independent barrister supported by the pro-democracy camp Audrey Eu was elected in the December by-election.

== Overall results ==
Before election:

↓
3	1
Pro-democracy	Pro-Beijing

Change in composition:

↓
3	2
Pro-democracy	Pro-Beijing

Party	Seats	Seats change	Contesting list(s)	Votes	%	% change
Democratic	2	0	1	131,788	35.3	–11.5
Frontier	1	+1	1	25,988	10.0	N/A
Independent	0	0	1	9,896	3.8	N/A
Pro-democracy camp	3	0	3	167,672	64.3	+4.8
DAB	2	+1	1	72,617	27.8	–1.5
New Forum	0	0	1	14,329	5.5	N/A
Independent	0	0	4	43,318	16.6	N/A
Pro-Beijing camp	2	0	6	140,320	49.6	+13.4
Independent	0	0	1	2,566	0.9	N/A
Turnout:				260,788	42.0	

== Candidates list ==
Vote share
1. Democratic (35.3%)
2. DAB (27.8%)
3. Frontier (10.0%)
4. New Forum (5.50%)
5. Other (21.4%)

Legislative Election 2000: Hong Kong Island
List	Candidates	Votes	Of total (%)	± from prev.
Democratic	Martin Lee Chu-ming, Yeung Sum Kam Nai-wai, Joseph Lai Chi-keong, Cheng Lai-king	92,074	35.3 (20+15.31)	−11.46
DAB	Cheng Kai-nam, Choy So-yuk Suen Kai-cheong, Christopher Chung Shu-kun, Yeung Wai-foon	72,617	27.8 (20+7.85)	−1.52
Frontier	Cyd Ho Sau-lan	25,988	10.0	N/A
Nonpartisan	Fung Leung-lo	15,419	5.9	N/A
Nonpartisan	Jennifer Chow Kit-bing	14,534	5.6	+2.04
New Forum	David Lan Hong-tsung, Fung Ho-keung, Chan Choi-hi, Regina Yeung Sum-yu	14,329	5.5	N/A
Ind. democrat	Tsang Kin-shing, Manuel Chan Tim-shing, Steve Chan Kwok-leung	9,896	3.8	N/A
Nonpartisan	Angel Leung On-kay	6,967	2.7	N/A
Nonpartisan	Paul Tse Wai-chun	6,398	2.5	N/A
Nonpartisan	Allen Yung Chan-lung	1,434	0.5	N/A
Nonpartisan	Andrew Shuen Pak-man	1,132	0.4	N/A
Total valid votes		260,788	100.00	
Rejected ballots		2,776		
Turnout		263,564	42.03	−9.93
Registered electors		618,451		

== See also ==
- Legislative Council of Hong Kong
- Hong Kong legislative elections
- 2000 Hong Kong legislative election
