= Shek Tong Tsui (constituency) =

- Former Elected constituency for the Central & Western District Council
- Boundary of Shek Tong Tsui in Central & Western District
- District: Central & Western
- Legislative Council constituency: Hong Kong Island West
- Population: 16,479 (2019)
- Electorate: 8,189 (2019)

Former constituency
- Created: 1994
- Abolished: 2023
- Number of members: One
- Created from: Kennedy Town East; Sai Ying Pun West

Shek Tong Tsui was one of the 15 constituencies in the Central and Western District.

It returned one member of the district council until it was abolished the 2023 electoral reforms.

Shek Tong Tsui constituency was loosely based on the northwestern corner of Shek Tong Tsui with estimated population of 16,479.

== Councillors represented ==
Election	Member	Party	%
1994	Chan Choi-hi	Democratic→Independent	77.02
1999	Chan Choi-hi	Independent	48.43
2003	Chan Choi-hi	Independent	59.39
2007	Chan Choi-hi	Independent	71.45
2011	Chan Choi-hi	Independent	72.63
2015	Chan Choi-hi	Independent	58.69
2019	Sam Yip Kam-lung →Vacant (Note: Resigned on 7 July 2021 over new oath-taking law.)	Independent	55.27

== Election results ==
=== 2010s ===
Central & Western District Council Election, 2019: Shek Tong Tsui
Party	Candidate	Votes	%	±%
Nonpartisan	Sam Yip Kam-lung	3,073	55.27	+13.97
Nonpartisan	Chan Choi-hi	2,487	44.73	−13.97
Majority		586	10.54	
Turnout		5,577	68.12	
Nonpartisan gain from Nonpartisan		Swing		

Central & Western District Council Election, 2015: Shek Tong Tsui
Party	Candidate	Votes	%	±%
Nonpartisan	Chan Choi-hi	1,898	58.7	–13.9
Nonpartisan	Sam Yip Kam-lung	1,336	41.3	
Majority		562	17.4	–27.8
Turnout		3,269	41.2	
Independent hold		Swing		

Central & Western District Council Election, 2011: Shek Tong Tsui
Party	Candidate	Votes	%	±%
Independent	Chan Choi-hi	1,871	72.6	−2.6
Independent	Ching Ming-tat	705	27.4	
Majority		1,166	45.2	−1.5
Independent hold		Swing		

=== 2000s ===
Central & Western District Council Election, 2007: Shek Tong Tsui
Party	Candidate	Votes	%	±%
Nonpartisan	Chan Choi-hi	1,892	75.2	+15.8
Independent	Kelvin Yim Ka-wing	756	28.5	
Majority		1136	46.7	+27.9
Nonpartisan hold		Swing		

Central & Western District Council Election, 2003: Shek Tong Tsui
Party	Candidate	Votes	%	±%
Independent	Chan Choi-hi	1,676	59.4	+11.0
CWDP	Michael Lai Wing-kuen	1,146	40.6	N/A
Majority		530	18.8	−1.4
Independent hold		Swing		

=== 1990s ===
Central & Western District Council Election, 1999: Shek Tong Tsui
Party	Candidate	Votes	%	±%
Independent	Chan Choi-hi	1,309	48.4	
Democratic	Vincent Wong Chak-lai	762	28.2	
DAB	Li Yueh-chin	632	23.4	
Majority		547	20.2	−33.8
Independent hold		Swing		

Central & Western District Board Election, 1994: Shek Tong Tsui
Party	Candidate	Votes	%	±%
Democratic	Chan Choi-hi	1,542	77.0	
Liberal	So Lai-yung	460	23.0	
Majority		582	54.0	(new)
Democratic win (new seat)				
