= Sheung Wan (constituency) =

Former Hong Kong constituency

- Former Elected constituency for the Central & Western District Council
- Boundary of Sheung Wan in Central & Western District
- District: Central & Western
- Legislative Council constituency: Hong Kong Island West
- Population: 14,981 (2019)
- Electorate: 7,032 (2019)

Former constituency
- Created: 1982
- Abolished: 2023
- Number of members: One

Sheung Wan was one of the 15 constituencies in the Central and Western District of Hong Kong, represented from 1994 to 2021 by Kam Nai-wai of the Democratic Party in the Central and Western District Council.

The constituency was loosely based on the Sheung Wan area with estimated population of 14,981.

== Boundaries ==
Sheung Wan constituency is roughly based on the northwestern portion of Sheung Wan area, bounded on the west by Wilmer Street, on the south by Queen's Road West and Hollywood Road, on the east by Ladder Street and Cleverly Street, and on the north by Victoria Harbour.

The entrances/exits of MTR Sheung Wan station, which are all located east of Cleverly Street, are thus not within the boundaries of the constituency, belonging to the neighbouring Chung Wan constituency instead, as is the eastern part of the Sheung Wan where Infinitus Plaza and Wing On Centre are located. Also, the part of Sheung Wan between Hollywood Road and Caine Road belongs to the Tung Wah constituency.

Bordering Sheung Wan are the constituencies of Chung Wan, Sai Ying Pun and Tung Wah.

== Councillors represented ==
The seat has been held by Kam Nai-wai since 1994. A founding member of the Democratic Party, Kam was a lawmaker representing the Hong Kong Island geographical constituency from 2008 to 2012.

=== 1982 to 1985 ===
Election	Member	Party
1982	Siu Man-ying	Nonpartisan

=== 1985 to 1994 ===
Election	First Member	First Party	Second Member	Second Party
1985	Anthony Ng Shun-man	Observers	Alexander Chang Yau-hung	Nonpartisan
1985	Anthony Ng Shun-man	HKAS	Alexander Chang Yau-hung	PHKS/Civic Association
1990	Anthony Ng Shun-man	United Democrat	Alexander Chang Yau-hung	LDF/Civic Association
1994	Anthony Ng Shun-man	Democratic	Alexander Chang Yau-hung	LDF/Civic Association

=== 1994 to 2023 ===
Election	Member	Party	%
1994	Kam Nai-wai→Vacant (Note: Resigned on 7 July 2021 over new oath-taking law.)	Democratic	70.83
1999	Kam Nai-wai→Vacant	Democratic	68.09
2003	Kam Nai-wai→Vacant	Democratic	70.66
2007	Kam Nai-wai→Vacant	Democratic	69.27
2011	Kam Nai-wai→Vacant	Democratic	55.13
2015	Kam Nai-wai→Vacant	Democratic	51.65
2019	Kam Nai-wai→Vacant	Democratic	59.41

== Election results ==
=== 2010s ===
Central & Western District Council Election, 2019: Sheung Wan
Party	Candidate	Votes	%	±%
Democratic	Kam Nai-wai	2,781	59.41	+7.71
FTU	Lui Hung-pan	1,900	40.59	−7.71
Majority		881	18.82	
Turnout		4,700	66.87	
Democratic hold		Swing		

Central & Western District Council Election, 2015: Sheung Wan
Party	Candidate	Votes	%	±%
Democratic	Kam Nai-wai	1,436	51.7	–3.4
Independent	Lui Hung-pan	1,344	48.3	
Majority		92	3.4	–17.1
Turnout		2,827	42.5	
Democratic hold		Swing		

Central & Western District Council Election, 2011: Sheung Wan
Party	Candidate	Votes	%	±%
Democratic	Kam Nai-wai	1,450	55.1	−14.2
Independent	Chan Yin-ho	910	34.6	N/A
People Power	Yim Tat-ming	270	10.3	N/A
Majority		540	20.5	−18.1
Democratic hold		Swing	N/A	

=== 2000s ===
Central & Western District Council Election, 2007: Sheung Wan
Party	Candidate	Votes	%	±%
Democratic	Kam Nai-wai	1,783	69.3	−1.4
DAB	Leung Yuen-yee	791	30.7	+1.4
Majority		992	38.6	−2.8
Democratic hold		Swing		

Central & Western District Council Election, 2003: Sheung Wan
Party	Candidate	Votes	%	±%
Democratic	Kam Nai-wai	1,756	70.7	+2.6
DAB	Chiu Wah-kuen	729	29.3	−2.6
Majority		1,027	41.4	+5.2
Democratic hold		Swing		

=== 1990s ===
Central & Western District Council Election, 1999: Sheung Wan
Party	Candidate	Votes	%	±%
Democratic	Kam Nai-wai	1,468	68.1	−2.7
DAB	Yuen Chiu-hing	688	31.9	+2.7
Majority		780	36.2	−5.4
Democratic hold		Swing		

Central & Western District Board Election, 1994: Sheung Wan
Party	Candidate	Votes	%	±%
Democratic	Kam Nai-wai	1,486	70.8	+18.1
DAB	Wong Chit-man	612	29.2	N/A
Majority		574	41.6	
Democratic hold		Swing		

Central & Western District Board Election, 1991: Sheung Wan
Party	Candidate	Votes	%	±%
United Democrats	Anthony Ng Shun-man	1,431	60.8	−1.0
LDF	Alexander Chang Yau-hung	1,250	53.1	+10.5
United Democrats	Kam Nai-wai	1,240	52.7	
United Democrats hold		Swing		
LDF hold		Swing		

=== 1980s ===
Central & Western District Board Election, 1988: Sheung Wan
Party	Candidate	Votes	%	±%
HKAS	Anthony Ng Shun-man	1,329	61.8	−3.8
PHKS	Alexander Chang Yau-hung	916	42.6	−8.6
Nonpartisan	Chan Hok-man	850	39.5	
HKAS hold		Swing		
PHKS hold		Swing		

Central & Western District Board Election, 1985: Sheung Wan
Party	Candidate	Votes	%	±%
Observers	Anthony Ng Shun-man	1,522	65.6	+20.3
Nonpartisan	Alexander Chang Yau-hung	1,187	51.2	
Nonpartisan	Tsui Mei-lam	1,086	46.8	
Observers gain from Nonpartisan		Swing		
Nonpartisan win (new seat)				

Central & Western District Board Election, 1982: Sheung Wan
Party	Candidate	Votes	%	±%
Nonpartisan	Shiu Man-ying	1,455	54.5	
Observers	Anthony Ng Shun-man	1,216	45.5	
Majority		239	9.0	
Nonpartisan win (new seat)				
