= 2007 Hong Kong Island by-election =

Legislative Council of Hong Kong election

- 2 December 2007
- Opinion polls
- Turnout: 52.06%
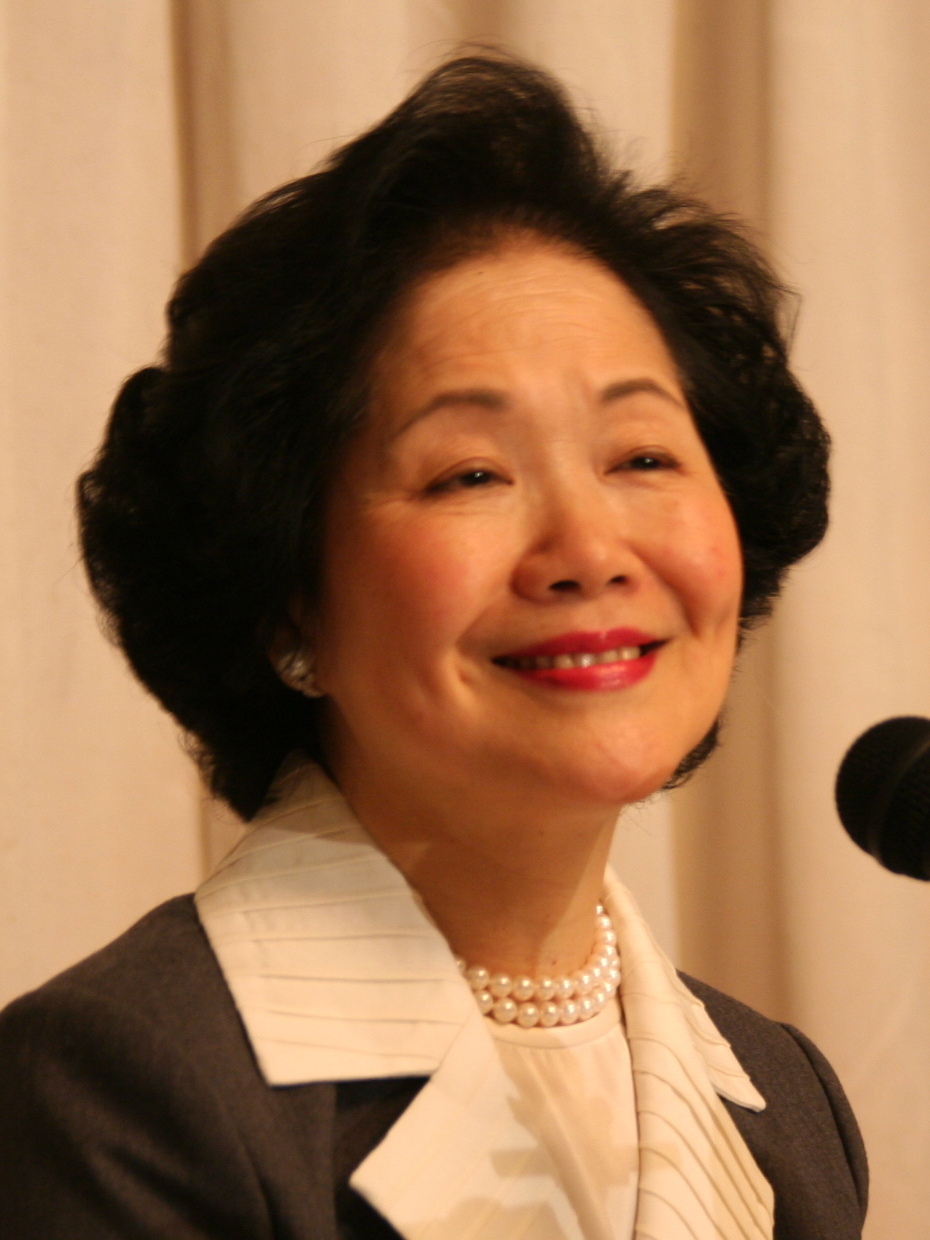

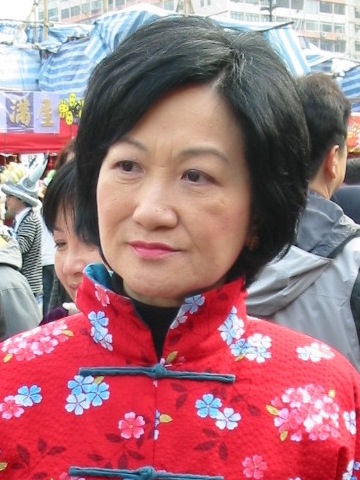
Candidate	Anson Chan	Regina Ip
Party	Independent	Independent
Alliance	Pan-democracy	Pro-Beijing
Popular vote	175,874	137,550
Percentage	54.84%	42.89%
Member before election
Ma Lik (deceased)
DAB
Elected Member
Anson Chan
Independent

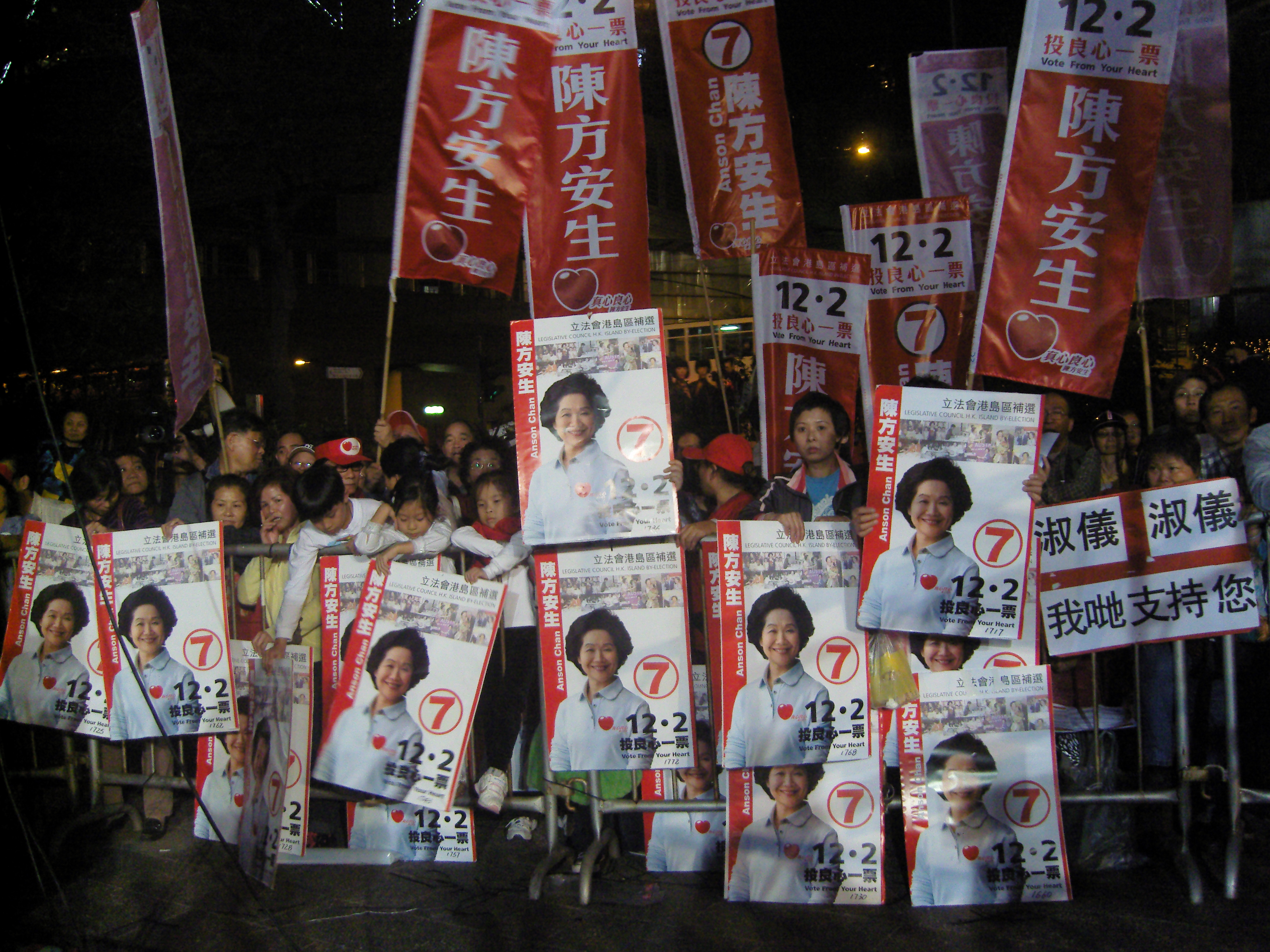
Anson Chan's supporters

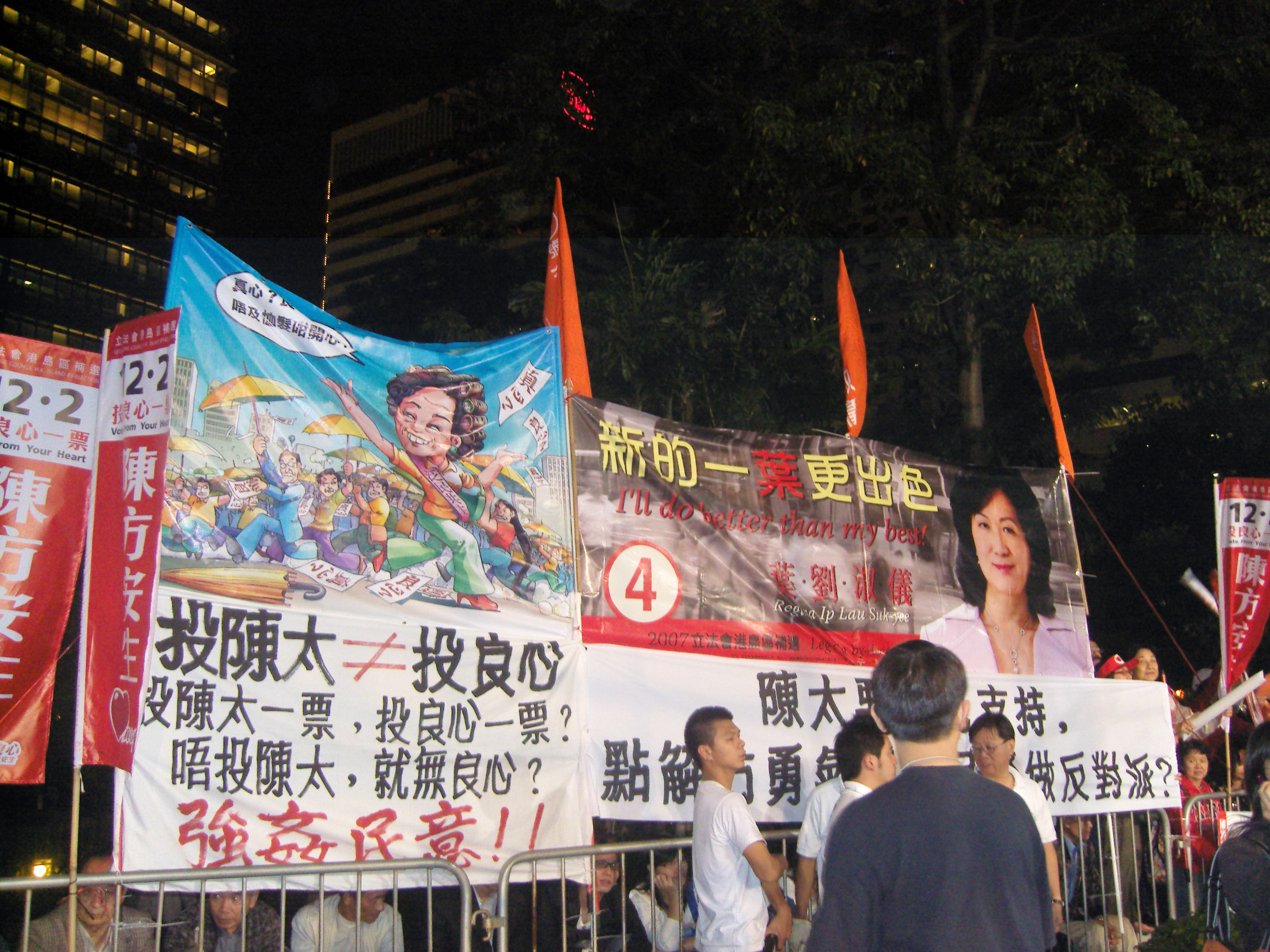
Regina Ip supporters, some bearing anti-Chan banners.

The 2007 Hong Kong Island by-election was held on 2 December 2007 and was won by Anson Chan with 54.6% of the votes cast. It was precipitated by the death of the then chairman of the Pro-Beijing Democratic Alliance for the Betterment and Progress of Hong Kong (DAB) Ma Lik on 8 August 2007.

It was the second by-election in a geographical constituency to be held since the transfer of sovereignty in 1997 and the largest remainder proportional representation electoral system was adopted in 1998, coincidentally in the same constituency – Hong Kong Island.

There were eight candidates in all, all standing as independents. However, the two front-runners had respectively secured the backing of the largest political groupings, Pan-democrats and Beijing loyalists. The pro-democracy camp agreed to unite behind a single candidate, Anson Chan, former Chief Secretary for Administration, selected through a selection process; the Liberal Party and the DAB bargained behind closed doors to select Regina Ip, the former Secretary for Security who resigned following the 500,000-strong 2003 1 July protest.

== Background ==
=== 2000 ===
The last by-election was held on 10 December 2000, when then DAB vice-chairman Gary Cheng declined to accept his seat as a result of a scandal. The current leader of the Civic Party, Audrey Eu, who was then running as an independent backed by the pro-democracy camp won the by-election with 52.1% of valid vote. Cheng was subsequently jailed for abuse of office.

=== 2004 ===
The previous election on 12 September 2004 returned six candidates to office based on a party list proportional representation system. The pro-Beijing camp returned two candidates, and pro-democracy camps three, with the remainder filled by the independent Rita Fan.

The election returned Martin Lee and Yeung Sum of the Democratic Party, Ma Lik, and Choy So Yuk of the DAB, Audrey Eu of the Civic Party, and Rita Fan to the council.

=== Trigger ===
Ma Lik, who announced on 8 August 2004 that he had colon cancer, died on 8 August 2007 in Guangzhou before his term expired. According to Hong Kong laws, such vacancies have to be filled by a by-election, unless the next regular election is scheduled to be held in less than four months.

The Legislative Council Secretariat issued a gazette notice on 10 August 2007, signifying that a vacancy in the Legislative Council has arisen on 8 August. Nominations would be open for two to three weeks, and there would be four to six weeks for canvassing before the election on Sunday 2 December.

The pan-democrats suggested that the by-election be held with the District Council election on 18 November to save on resources. The government rejected the idea, arguing that it might confuse voters. There were concerns that the government wanted to lower the turnout by holding the elections on separate days in order to create a more favorable situation for pro-government candidates.

Although Hong Kong legislative geographical constituencies are elected by proportional representation, the fact that there is only one vacancy turns it effectively into a first-past-the-post race. The winner serves the remainder of Ma's natural term of office, which would have expired on 30 September 2008.

== Contenders ==
Kam Nai Wai of the Democratic Party declared his intention to run, whereas Regina Ip, who resigned for the infamous National Security Bill tabled during her term as the security chief in the Hong Kong Government, became the sole candidate of the pro-Beijing camp.

The Civic Party, The Frontier of the pro-democracy camp, and the pro-Beijing HKFTU decided they would not field any candidate. Several other contenders had been mentioned by the media.

=== Primaries ===
Results of previous elections in the Hong Kong Island constituency has fuelled the expectation of 60:40 vote split between the democrats and the loyalists. As long as the pro-democratic camp coordinated successfully to nominate a single candidate, they have a higher chance of winning. To that end, the pro-democracy camp agreed to unite behind a single candidate; the Liberal Party and the DAB bargained behind closed doors. Each party or group confirmed their candidate on or before 10 September.

The selection mechanism for the Democrat candidate consisted of primary elections which consisted of a public debate, an opinion poll and primary elections.

On 30 September 2007, it was announced that Anson Chan had triumphed over Lo Wing-lok to be the standard-bearer for the Pan-democrats.

=== Official contenders ===
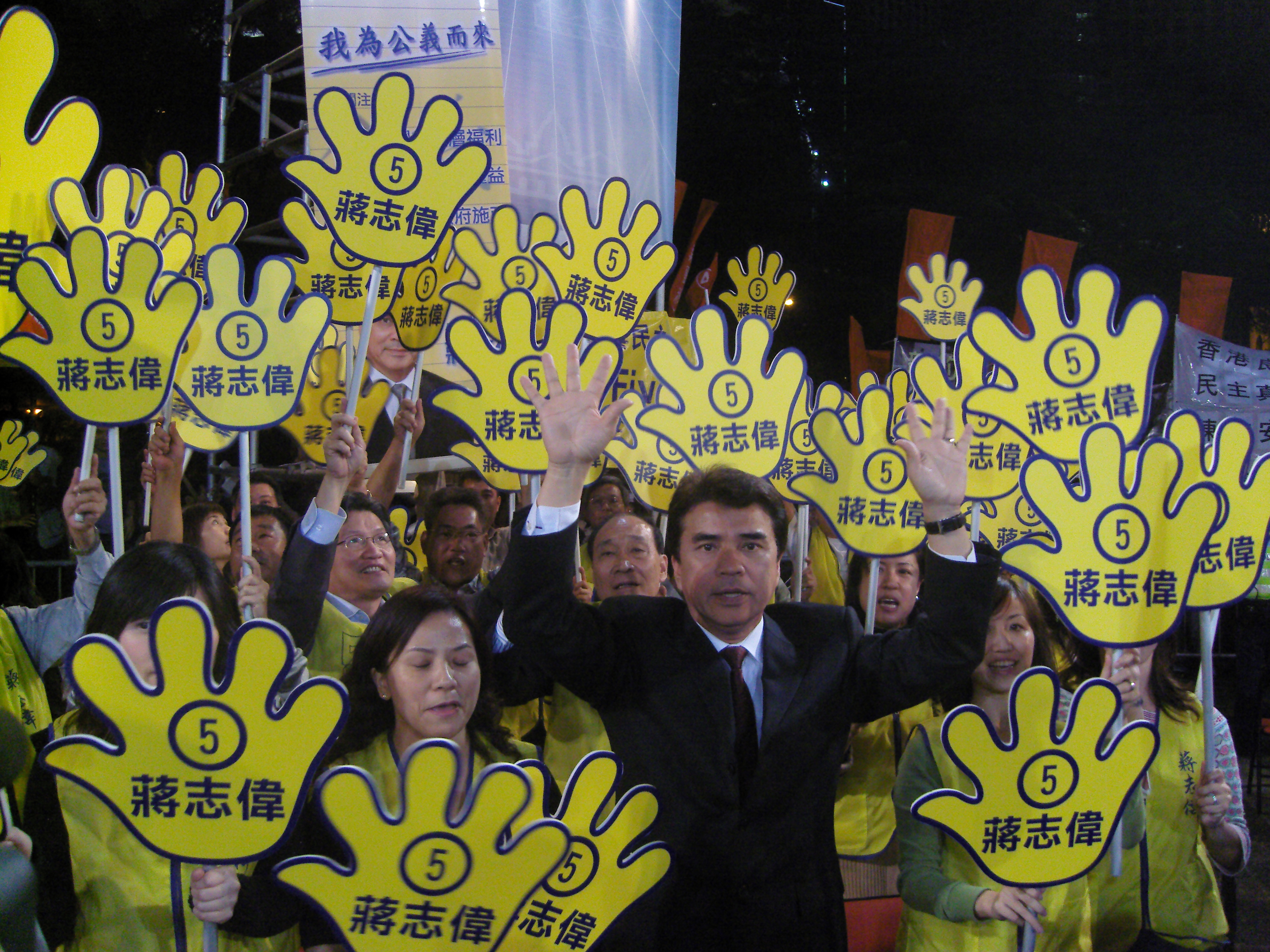
Stanley Chiang's supporters

1. Lau Yuk Shing (柳玉成), former member of League of Social Democrats before late October, now of the Labor Party. He broke ranks with the pro-democracy camp to stand in the by-election. He uses Putonghua, because he can't speak Cantonese.
2. Lee Wing-kin (李永健), barrister.
3. Siu See-kong (蕭思江), solicitor
4. Regina Ip, pro-Beijing former Secretary for Security. She declared herself "an independent".
5. Stanley Tandon Lal Chiang (蔣志偉), Chairman of Lok Ma Chau-Hong Kong Freight Association
6. Cecilia Ling Wai-wan (凌蔚雲), Director.
7. Anson Chan, former Chief Secretary in the Hong Kong Government
8. Ho Loy (何來), monuments and heritage campaigner.

Anson Chan and Regina Ip are without doubt the front-runners in this election. Chan is supported by the pan-democrats, while Ip has the blessing of the pro-Beijing forces, and the pro-business Liberal Party.

Regina Ip, the former security chief in the Hong Kong Government who resigned following the 500,000-strong 2003 1 July protest, declared her intention to run on 27 September 2007. She was backed by the DAB chairman Tam Yiu Chung, Liberal Party chairman James Tien, and Ho Chung Tai of The Alliance.

Anson Chan, former Chief Secretary for Administration secured the backing of the united Democratic parties. Nevertheless, Lau Yuk Shing, former member of League of Social Democrats provoked the wrath of some democrats when he broke ranks and stood.

== Issues ==
=== Universal suffrage in 2012 ===
Ip, who had previously been maintaining a "pragmatic" defense of universal suffrage for the chief executive and Legislative Council elections in 2017, said that it could be achieved by 2012 under her proposal unveiled her platform on 23 October. She emphasised her fallback plan was to delay universal Legco polls to 2016 at the latest, and 2017 for the chief executive election. Chan declared Ip's new proposal on the chief executive election a step backwards, saying it would make it harder for potential candidates.

Chan went against her core group of advisors, who had proposed in March that a delay in universal suffrage until 2016 and 2017 was acceptable, and declared that she was advocating full universal suffrage by 2012 to distinguish her from Ip's stance.

The people of Hong Kong are ready for universal suffrage and I support its implementation for the two elections in 2012 because the SAR government has failed to put forward any convincing reason for delaying this step beyond that date.

— Anson Chan, unveiling her platform on universal suffrage (2007)

However, a local delegate to the National People's Congress, joined the fray on 4 November by saying that it was within the powers of the Central government to decide on a timetable for universal suffrage in the chief executive and the Legislative Council elections. "If Hong Kong people want universal suffrage earlier, they should show more respect for the powers of the central government" said the former lawmaker Maria Tam Wai-chu.

== Debate ==
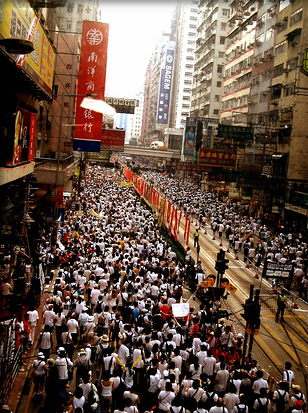
Article 23 was a major focal point for the debate

=== 8 November hustings ===
The eight candidates partook in a debate at University of Hong Kong's Loke Yew Hall on 8 November 2007. It was apparent that 500 members of the audience were mainly interested in the two front-runners. One of the key questions directed at Ip, asked whether she would be as uncompromising in fighting for universal suffrage by 2012 in Hong Kong as the hardline attitude she took in promoting Article 23. Ip contested the assertion that the 500,000 demonstrators took to the streets because of Article 23 legislation alone. "The 500,000 protesters took to the streets for many issues," she said. The remarks caused a stir in the crowd.

=== 25 November 2007 ===
On 25 November, Ip and Chan openly traded insults and explicitly targeted each other's weakest points during the forum. Chan attacked Ip's pivotal role in the Article 23 bill as proof she was not a genuine supporter of democracy. Chan derided Ip for saying Hitler killed 7 million people after coming to power through democracy, and then saying she was fighting for universal suffrage. Chan further attacked Ip's proposal for pre-selecting the Chief Executive nominees as "a step back for democracy". Ip responded that she supports the 2012 universal suffrage since she studied in the United States, and accused Chan of being "a radical". Chan said "The people will know very clearly who is a fake democrat and who genuinely supports real democracy."

Ip then accused Chan of stirring up confrontation when Chan asked whether her apology over Article 23 was sincere or just a strategy. Questioned on the reintroduction of Article 23, Ip said the Government should obtain public consensus.

== Opinion polls ==
View source data.

Date(s) conducted	Polling organisation/client	Sample size	Lau	Lee	Siu	Ip	Chiang	Ling	Chan	Ho	None of above/ Undecided	Lead
30 Nov	Lingnan University	431	0.2%	0.0%	0.2%	27.4%	0.5%	0.0%	36.0%	0.9%	34.8%	8.6%
28–30 Nov	HKUPOP	1010	<0.5%	2.9%	<0.5%	30.7%	0.7%	<0.5%	43.8%	1.4%	22.2%	13.1%
27–29 Nov	HKUPOP	863	<0.5%	3.2%	<0.5%	32.2%	0.7%	<0.5%	42.7%	1.2%	22.3%	10.5%
27 Nov	Lingnan University	544	0.4%	0.0%	0.4%	22.6%	0.7%	0.0%	39.9%	0.7%	35.2%	17.3%
26–28 Nov	HKUPOP	819	<0.5%	3.3%	<0.5%	35.2%	0.6%	<0.5%	43.0%	0.9%	19.3%	7.8%
25–27 Nov	HKUPOP	776	<0.5%	3.4%	<0.5%	32.9%	0.8%	<0.5%	46.1%	0.7%	18.6%	13.2%
24–26 Nov	HKUPOP	783	0.7%	3.3%	<0.5%	31.4%	0.5%	<0.5%	48.2%	0.7%	17.9%	16.8%
23–25 Nov	HKUPOP	781	0.5%	3.3%	<0.5%	30.6%	0.5%	<0.5%	46.0%	0.7%	20.9%	15.4%
23 Nov	Lingnan University	462	0.2%	0.0%	0.0%	24.5%	0.2%	0.0%	35.1%	0.2%	39.8%	10.6%
22–24 Nov	HKUPOP	781	0.5%	3.3%	<0.5%	32.0%	0.7%	<0.5%	44.7%	<0.5%	21.3%	12.7%
21–23 Nov	HKUPOP	744	<0.5%	3.4%	<0.5%	33.1%	0.9%	<0.5%	43.0%	0.6%	21.6%	9.9%
20–22 Nov	HKUPOP	716	<0.5%	3.5%	<0.5%	30.9%	1.0%	<0.5%	47.1%	0.6%	19.4%	16.2%
20 Nov	Lingnan University	478	0.0%	0.2%	0.2%	26.6%	0.2%	0.0%	35.8%	0.4%	36.6%	9.2%
19–21 Nov	HKUPOP	687	<0.5%	3.6%	<0.5%	32.3%	<0.5%	<0.5%	47.3%	<0.5%	18.4%	15%
18–20 Nov	HKUPOP	687	<0.5%	3.6%	<0.5%	31.7%	<0.5%	<0.5%	49.1%	0.6%	17.5%	17.4%
17–19 Nov	HKUPOP	684	<0.5%	3.6%	<0.5%	33.5%	<0.5%	<0.5%	49.3%	1.0%	15.1%	15.8%
16–18 Nov	HKUPOP	688	<0.5%	3.5%	<0.5%	30.8%	<0.5%	<0.5%	51.8%	1.2%	15.2%	21%
16 Nov	Lingnan University	514	0.4%	0.4%	0.0%	22.2%	0.0%	0.2%	32.5%	0.6%	43.7%	10.3%
15–17 Nov	HKUPOP	691	<0.5%	3.5%	<0.5%	31.3%	0.7%	<0.5%	49.6%	0.9%	16.4%	18.3%
14–16 Nov	HKUPOP	691	<0.5%	3.6%	<0.5%	32.3%	0.7%	<0.5%	46.0%	<0.5%	19.6%	13.7%
13–15 Nov	HKUPOP	654	<0.5%	3.7%	<0.5%	35.6%	0.9%	<0.5%	42.8%	<0.5%	19.5%	7.2%
13 Nov	Lingnan University	435	0.0%	0.2%	0.0%	21.1%	0.0%	0.0%	34.3%	0.5%	44.0%	13.2%
12–14 Nov	HKUPOP	621	<0.5%	3.9%	<0.5%	37.3%	0.7%	0.5%	42.1%	0.8%	18.3%	4.8%
11–13 Nov	HKUPOP	590	<0.5%	3.9%	<0.5%	33.9%	0.9%	0.5%	43.9%	1.0%	19.3%	10%
10–12 Nov	HKUPOP	587	<0.5%	3.8%	<0.5%	29.6%	0.9%	<0.5%	45.9%	1.6%	21.3%	16.3%
9–11 Nov	HKUPOP	585	<0.5%	3.7%	<0.5%	27.7%	0.5%	<0.5%	45.1%	1.1%	25.0%	17.4%
8–10 Nov	HKUPOP	587	<0.5%	3.8%	<0.5%	31.3%	0.5%	<0.5%	41.6%	1.2%	24.8%	10.3%
7–9 Nov	HKUPOP	587	<0.5%	3.9%	0.5%	33.0%	<0.5%	<0.5%	42.1%	1.0%	22.2%	9.1%
6–8 Nov	HKUPOP	569	<0.5%	4.0%	0.5%	33.4%	0.5%	<0.5%	44.3%	1.4%	19.4%	10.9%
5–7 Nov	HKUPOP	547	<0.5%	4.0%	<0.5%	32.4%	<0.5%	<0.5%	45.9%	1.1%	19.3%	13.5%
4–6 Nov	HKUPOP	527	<0.5%	4.1%	<0.5%	33.1%	<0.5%	<0.5%	44.1%	0.9%	21.1%	11%
3–5 Nov	HKUPOP	526	<0.5%	4.2%	<0.5%	35.1%	<0.5%	<0.5%	42.6%	0.6%	20.4%	7.5%
2–4 Nov	HKUPOP	527	<0.5%	4.2%	<0.5%	37.5%	<0.5%	<0.5%	43.0%	0.6%	17.2%	5.5%
1–3 Nov	HKUPOP	527	0.6%	4.2%	<0.5%	37.6%	<0.5%	<0.5%	41.4%	<0.5%	18.9%	3.8%
31 Oct–2 Nov	HKUPOP	526	<0.5%	4.2%	<0.5%	35.6%	0.6%	<0.5%	40.9%	<0.5%	21.8%	5.3%

Date(s) conducted	Polling organisation/client	Sample size	Pan-democracy camp					Pro-Beijing camp		None of above/ Undecided	Lead
Date(s) conducted	Polling organisation/client	Sample size	Chan	Ho	Wong	Lo	Kam	R. Ip	K. H. Ip	None of above/ Undecided	Lead
4–7 Sep	Ming Pao	428	39.3%	–	–	–	–	35.8%	–	25.0%	3.5%
4–5 Sep	Apple Daily/HKU POP	502	52.2%	–	–	–	–	32.3%	–	15.5%	19.9%
23–26 Aug	Ming Pao	289	–	21%	10%	–	3%	45%	–	21%	24%
23–26 Aug	Ming Pao	289	–	34%	–	–	–	50%	–	16%	16%
23–26 Aug	Ming Pao	289	–	–	30%	–	–	56%	–	14%	20%
10–13 Aug	Ming Pao	299	–	27%	–	4%	6%	28%	8%	27%	1%
10–13 Aug	Ming Pao	299	–	38%	–	–	–	43%	–	19%	5%
10–13 Aug	Ming Pao	299	–	48%	–	–	–	–	29%	23%	19%

== Controversies ==
=== Beijing's influence ===
Chan declared her hopes of being a bridge between Hong Kong and Beijing should she win the by-election. Ng Hong-man, 82-year-old veteran Hong Kong deputy of the National People's Congress, said Chan had severed ties with Beijing by her past actions. "Chan is now moving toward a head-on collision with Beijing as she has sided with the democratic opposition against Beijing." Ng said she infuriated Beijing leaders by being disloyal to and uncooperative with Tung Chee-hwa whilst he was chief executive; her approval of the City Hall for the assembly of the Falun Gong was also a sore point, as was Chan's accusation that the late CPPCC delegate Xu Simin's intervention over Radio Television Hong Kong had breached "one country, two systems".

On 30 November Chan's pro-democratic supporters warned the public about the consequences of further pro-Beijing influences. Former head of ICAC and Chan's adviser Lily Yam Kwan Pui-ying wrote, "I am sending out this personal appeal to you because Hong Kong is in great danger of being dominated by one voice and one party under different guises, where everyone fears expressing his or her choice and preference. This will happen sooner than we think unless we all act NOW."

=== Favouritism allegations ===
Chan has alleged that the Government has been secretly favouring her opponent, saying that the Chief Secretary had written an email inviting policy secretaries to assist Regina Ip, although this has been denied by the Chief Executive Donald Tsang.

Other favoritism allegations include Party vice chairman of the DAB, Lau Kong wah, who questioned whether Hong Kong police were biased in favoring the democrats, saying they made no arrest on 15 November when a DAB staff member was pushed to the ground by a Democratic party member. He alleged the pan-democrats were playing victims and creating tragedy to win sympathy for Chan's campaign.

=== Political gaffes ===
On 7 October 2007, Chan made a brief appearance at a rally to demand full democracy by 2012. She left the rally to visit her hairdresser before an engagement that evening. She was accused of lacking in political sensitivity. Whilst electioneering in November, a political analyst said Chan may have made another serious blunder by agreeing to be a sponsor for Retired Persons' Association.

=== Abuse of position allegations ===
Alex Tsui, a disgruntled former ICAC official accused Chan of obtaining a 100% mortgage to purchase a flat in 1993 when she was chief secretary, suggesting an abuse of power. A City University commentator said the issue marked the start of a smear campaign against Chan.

=== Campaign violence ===
With the unprecedented media interest raising the stakes in the contest, Ip's supporters have been waging a campaign of increasing bitterness. While Ip officially adopted "I'll do better than my best" as a campaign slogan, Chan uses "vote with your conscience" on her election posters. Ip's supporters, however, have put up banners attacking Chan personally. After their surprise victories in the District Council elections the week before, "Ip's supporters ... have escalated their dogging of Chan to the point of harassment, if not outright intimidation" according to political commentator, Michael DeGolyer. This type of direct face-to-face violence has never been seen in Hong Kong politics: a Civic Party member was sent to hospital after he was injured when an Ip supporter, a failed DAB District Council candidate, tried to snatch his mobile phone, while he took pictures of their activities. "The violence has been worse than in previous elections," Audrey Eu said. She said there had been allegations of candidates, supporters and campaign posters having been targeted; the printer of election materials had his shop damaged and a supporter's taxi had its windows smashed."

=== Facebook battle & public response ===
After the All-eight LegCo election debate was over, Ip was asked whether she was unhappy with the jeering. Ip said that she expected criticism and that she had more than 400 friends in her Facebook account. By 21 November, the "Regina for Councillor" Facebook group grew to 530 members. Another Facebook group called "No Regina Ip Allowed" has close to 750 members. And another group called "Anson Chan for Hong Kong" had close to 2,400 members.

=== Apple Daily ===
Echoing fears of a low turnout which would favour the pro-Beijing camp, the pro-democracy journal Apple Daily, who had been partisan to Chan's campaign, published a special headlined "Mrs Chan's Situation in Danger" on polling day. Although some detractors claimed the publication should form part of her campaign expenditure, Chan praised Hong Kong's right to free speech.

== Results ==
Hong Kong Island by-election 2007
Party	Candidate	Votes	%	±%
Nonpartisan (Ind. democrat)	Anson Maria Elizabeth Chan Fang On-sang	175,874	54.84	
Nonpartisan	Regina Ip Lau Suk-yee	137,550	42.89	
Nonpartisan	Tandon Lai Chiang	3,518	1.10	
Nonpartisan	Ho Loy	1,593	0.50	
Nonpartisan	Ling Wai-wan	822	0.19	
Nonpartisan	Siu See-kong	613	0.19	
Nonpartisan	Lee Wing-kin	401	0.12	
Nonpartisan	Lau Yuk-shing	344	0.11	
Majority		38,324	11.95	
Total valid votes		320,715	100.00	
Rejected ballots		1,223		
Turnout		321,938	52.06	
Registered electors		618,398		
Nonpartisan gain from DAB		Swing		

== See also ==
- United front in Hong Kong
