= Louis Shih =

Louis Shih Tai Cho (Chinese: 史泰祖) (born 1952 in Hong Kong) is a Hong Kong dermatologist and deputy chairman of pro-Beijing New People's Party.

Shih grew up on a public housing estate in Kwun Tong, Kowloon. He graduated from La Salle College and the MBBS of the University of Hong Kong. He emigrated to Canada in the early 1980s, but returned to Hong Kong in 1995. He is now married with three children.

Shih was the chairman of SynergyNet, a policy thinktank in the Hong Kong pro-democracy camp. But he crossed the floor to support Regina Ip, the former Secretary for Security of the Hong Kong SAR and a pro-Beijing politician, to participate in the 2007 Hong Kong Island by-election. The following year, he stood in the legislative elections with Ip for the Hong Kong Island seats, but lost.
