= Regina Ip =

Hong Kong politician

The Honourable Regina Ip Lau Suk-yee GBM GBS JP
- 葉劉淑儀
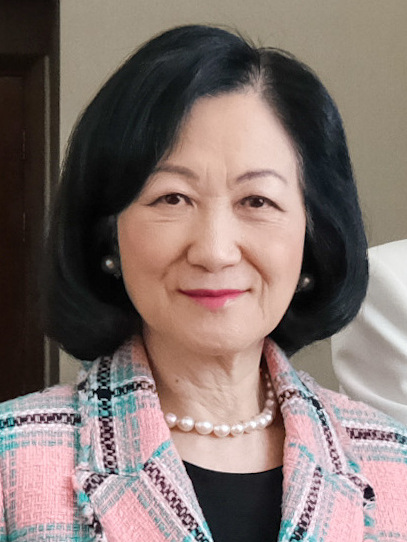
- Ip in 2023

Convenor of the Non-official Members of the Executive Council
- Incumbent
- Assumed office 1 July 2022
- Appointed by: John Lee
- Preceded by: Bernard Charnwut Chan

Non-official Member of the Executive Council
- Incumbent
- Assumed office 1 July 2017
- Appointed by: Carrie Lam; John Lee
- In office 17 October 2012 – 15 December 2016
- Appointed by: Leung Chun-ying

Member of the Legislative Council
- In office 1 January 2022 – 31 December 2025
- Preceded by: New constituency
- Constituency: Hong Kong Island West
- In office 1 October 2008 – 31 December 2021
- Preceded by: Anson Chan
- Succeeded by: Constituency abolished
- Constituency: Hong Kong Island

Chairwoman of the New People's Party
- Incumbent
- Assumed office 9 January 2011
- Preceded by: New party

Secretary for Security
- In office 31 August 1998 – 25 July 2003
- Preceded by: Peter Lai
- Succeeded by: Ambrose Lee

Director of Immigration
- In office 1996 – 1998
- Preceded by: Laurence Leung
- Succeeded by: Ambrose Lee

Director of Industry Department
- In office 1995 – 1996
- Preceded by: Denise Yue
- Succeeded by: Francis Ho

Personal details
- Born: Lau Suk-yee; 24 August 1950 (age 76) Hong Kong
- Party: New People's Party
- Spouse: Sammy Ip Man-ho (m. 1981–1997)
- Children: 1
- Education: St. Stephen's Girls' College; University of Hong Kong (BA); University of Glasgow (MLitt); Stanford University (MS, MA)

Regina Ip
- Traditional Chinese: 葉劉淑儀
- Simplified Chinese: 叶刘淑仪
Transcriptions
Standard Mandarin
- Hanyu Pinyin: Yè-Liú Shūyí
Yue: Cantonese
- Jyutping: Ip6-Lau4 Suk1yee4

Regina Ip Lau Suk-yee GBM GBS JP (Chinese: 葉劉淑儀; née Lau; born 24 August 1950) is a Hong Kong politician. She is currently the Convenor of the Executive Council (ExCo) as well as the founder and current chairperson of the New People's Party. Ip served as a member of the Legislative Council of Hong Kong (LegCo) from 2008 to 2025, representing Hong Kong Island and Hong Kong Island West. She was formerly a prominent government official of the Hong Kong Special Administrative Region (HKSAR) and was the first woman to be appointed the Secretary for Security to head the disciplinary service. She is also the founder and Chairlady of Savantas Policy Institute, a think-tank in Hong Kong.

Ip became a controversial figure for her role advocating the passage of the national security legislation to implement Hong Kong Basic Law Article 23, and after this legislation was withdrawn, she became the first principal official to resign from the administration of Chief Executive Tung Chee-hwa. She took a sabbatical to study for a master's degree. She contested the 2007 Hong Kong Island by-election for the Legislative Council but was defeated by Anson Chan in the two-horse race. She ran again in the 2008 Legislative Council election and won, gaining a seat in the Hong Kong Island. She was re-elected in the 2012 and 2016 elections.

Ip is widely known to have been keen on the Chief Executive top post. She ran in both 2012 and 2017 Chief Executive elections but did not secure a minimum number of 150 nominations from the 1,200-member Election Committee to enter the race on both occasions. In 2020, Larry Diamond, her supervisor at Stanford University, publicly criticized Ip's handling of the democracy movement and freedom of the press in Hong Kong.

== Early life ==
Ip was born in what was then British Hong Kong in 1950; her father was Chinese Singaporean trader Lau Fook-seng, and her mother was actress Wa Choi-Fung (華彩鳳), the second wife of her father. She attended St. Stephen's Girls' College, after which she read English literature at the University of Hong Kong, graduating with first-class honours; she later obtained a Master of Letters degree from the University of Glasgow, where she studied Elizabethan poet Sir Philip Sidney.

== Government career ==
In the 1970s, Ip joined the Hong Kong Government as an Administrative Officer. In 1986, she, accompanied by her husband, went to the Stanford Graduate School of Business to study for an MS in Management under the Sloan Programme. She took various bureaucratic positions before she was appointed Director of Industry Department in September 1995.

=== Ministerial career ===
In August 1996, she was appointed Director of Immigration – a post usually filled by officials from within the Immigration Department. She was the first woman to hold the post, and continued until after the 1997 handover. While she held that post, the UK government decided to grant full British citizenship for 50,000 Hong Kong families. She was also head of immigration during the right of abode saga, when the Hong Kong government requested the National People's Congress in Beijing to intervene after the courts ruled against the government, essentially granting the Hong Kong government the ability to simply ignore the court's ruling after it granted right of abode to the children of Hong Kong residents who held right of abode whether or not those children were born in Hong Kong.

In July 1998, Ip was appointed to the post of Secretary for Security – again, the first woman to hold that post. She became the first government minister to "declare her political stance".

Ip became one of the so-called 14 principal officials and a member of the Executive Council during Tung Chee-hwa's second term in government on 1 July 2002. She was well known at that time as a hawkish, uncompromising figure in the Government, with some describing her as "a staunch, arrogant, authoritarian and yet outspoken bureaucrat". As security minister, she promoted the adoption of the controversial Article 23 of Hong Kong's Basic Law. After massive public protests and the government's withdrawal of the proposed national security legislation, Ip resigned from office on 25 June 2003, citing personal reasons.

== Political career ==
In 2003, Ip returned to Stanford University to pursue a master's degree in East Asian Studies, with Larry Diamond as her supervisor. Her thesis, Hong Kong: Case Study in Democratic Development in Transitional Society, reportedly expressed admiration for a bicameral system and suggested that political parties in Hong Kong be strengthened and be more inclusive. She returned to Hong Kong in 2006. She set up a policy think tank, Savantas Policy Institute, giving rise to media speculation that she was planning to run for the office of Chief Executive sometime in the future. In September 2007, she declared her intention to run for the Legislative Council in the Hong Kong Island by-election. She apologised for her handling of the Article 23 situation and hoped to put it behind her. However, she received only 43% of the vote, defeated by Anson Chan.

=== Legislative Councillor ===
Ip ran in the 2008 Hong Kong legislative election in the Hong Kong Island geographical constituency, forming a ticket including dermatologist Louis Shih and two elected District Councillors, Albert Wong and Ronald Chan. Her ticket won a total of 61,073 votes, the second highest on Hong Kong Island and the fourth highest Hong Kong wide. She was sworn in as Legislative Councillor on 8 October 2008.

In January 2011, she launched a middle-class oriented party called New People's Party. The party held two seats in the legislature, herself and Michael Tien, after the 2012 Legislative council election, in which Ip was elected with 30,289 votes, despite losing almost half of the votes. She was subsequently appointed to the Executive Council of Hong Kong by Chief Executive Leung Chun-ying after the election, in which she served until December 2016 when she ran for the Chief Executive for the second time. Her party expanded its district base when it allied with the Civil Force in 2014. Ip was re-elected to the Legislative Council in 2016, with the highest votes of 60,760 in Hong Kong Island.

=== 2012 Chief Executive bid ===
Ip was known to be interested in the Chief Executive post. She expressed her intention to run in the 2012 election but dropped out on 15 December. Following a number of scandals surrounding Henry Tang, Ip re-announced her candidacy in the race on 20 February. She withdrew her candidacy after failing to receive enough nominations before the deadline and thus did not qualify to stand for the election on 29 February, which made her campaign last for only nine days.

=== 2017 Chief Executive bid ===
Ip has expressed her intention to consider running in the 2017 Chief Executive election. After incumbent Leung Chun-ying announced he would not seek for re-election, Ip resigned from the Executive Council to launch her campaign. She announced her candidacy on 15 December under the campaign slogan "Win back Hong Kong" after receiving her party's endorsement. She called for a relaunch of the electoral reform process under Beijing's restrictive framework as decreed by the National People's Congress Standing Committee (NPCSC) on 31 August 2020. She also pledged to enact controversial Article 23 with "suitable measures".

Ip got emotional and tear-eyed in a media gathering, "[I]n the past ten years I started from nothing, working hard bit by bit, splashing out my own money, putting in much mental and physical effort," Ip said as her voice shook. "Can you say I had not taken on responsibilities for the Hong Kong society? When I handled Article 23, I did not perform satisfactorily?" she defended herself, "I have taken responsibility under the accountability system and have already apologised multiple times. I was not shameless, I did not hold onto my powers. I stepped down from the administration. I'll leave for society to judge whether I have the guts to take on responsibilities. I definitely have taken on a lot of responsibilities." Ip's remarks came after Leung Chun-ying praised Lam for her "ability and willingness to take on responsibilities" As Carrie Lam declared her candidacy and Tsang was expected to run, political analysts said that could endanger Ip's chances of getting the minimum 150 nominations to enter the race. Ip revealed that two or three electors, including businessman Allan Zeman, have turned their backs on her to support Lam.

Supported by her New People's Party and a few electors from business sectors, Ip also gained a nomination from a pro-democrat elector from the Accountancy subsector, who wished to send Ip into the race to split Lam's votes. However, as Lam aimed to grab more than 600 nominations, Ip faced an uphill battle to secure her nominations. She urged "a certain candidate" not to ask for additional backing since that person had secured more than enough nominations already. Ip withdrew from the election, conceding the number of nominations hours before the nomination deadline on 1 March, for the second time after her 2012 bid. She received the number of nominations "far behind what was needed". She attributed her failure to the restrictive selection process of the 1,200 structure of the Election Committee membership as she was "squeezed out" by the Beijing-supported Lam and democrats-supported Tsang and Woo.

== Views ==
Ip has taken controversial stances during her career including advocating for the Public Order Ordinance and defending government policy denying right of abode to the children of Hong Kong people born in mainland China since the 1997 handover.

=== Article 23 ===
According to Ku, Ip had turned herself into a provocative political figure due to her departure from the "institutionalised bureaucratic ritual" adopted by civil servants in the past. She spearheaded the government's attempt to codify Hong Kong Basic Law Article 23, and pushed hard for it to be legislated by July 2003. Between September 2002 and July 2003, her popularity plunged. In October 2002, she made a remark about Adolf Hitler at the City University.

Hitler was elected by the people. But he ended up killing seven million people. This proves that democracy is not a cure-all medicine.

Ip downplayed any opposition to the bill, predicting only 30,000 people would show up at the planned demonstration(s). Ip blamed political and religious leaders for creating a "herd mentality". Her popularity plummeted when one remark after another contradicted popular opinion, most notably in regard to her commitment to push the bill despite the commotion and chaos of the SARS outbreak in 2003.

Detractors also took shots at her bushy hairstyle, nicknaming her "Broomhead" (掃把頭). This included a comic book which caricatured her in police uniform and signature bushy hairstyle. She openly admitted that although she disliked the nickname, she would not change her hairstyle just to please her critics. Regarding the controversy she said "I think I would like to be remembered as somebody who was not afraid to speak out, even if that might affect my popularity." Ip later said "I made a mistake in promoting the bill" and apologized for remarks she had made while pushing for Article 23.

=== Views on democracy ===
Ip has been criticised for her perceived inconsistent stance toward democracy. Following her return from the United States, she shifted her public position during her campaign for a seat in the legislative assembly in 2007 by saying "the only way forward for Hong Kong is complete democratization", in contrast to her position before. Todd Crowell of the Asia Times referred to her as a "born-again democrat". Anson Chan, her main rival supported by the pro-democracy camp in the 2007 by-election, labelled her a "fake democrat" because of this.

In February 2022, Ip wrote a commentary on SCMP, criticizing Western democracy and saying that "Many continue to indulge in the fallacious fantasy that adopting a procedure for electing our political leaders based on public participation will deliver good governance."

In May 2023, after the government announced that District Councils would have democratically elected seats be reduced, Ip defended the government's decision and said "It is not in the interests of the city to be at loggerheads with its motherland, let alone a hotbed for separatism and subversion."

=== Views on press freedom ===
In July 2008, Ip was once again embroiled in controversy for her comments about police tactics used against reporters covering the heated scenes in queues for Olympics tickets. In commenting about the man-handling of Hong Kong reporters by the Beijing police, she had said that "neck-shoving [techniques]... were most effective in stopping trouble-makers". The following day, she stated that she supported freedom of the press and apologised for the "slip of the tongue", clarifying that she was neither implying that journalists were troublemakers, nor endorsing the actions of the police. Democratic Party lawmaker Yeung Sum referred to this as a Freudian slip that showed up her true colours.

=== Allegedly racist comments on Filipino maids ===
In April 2015, Ip wrote in a controversial article in Ming Pao that she had received complaints while she was Secretary for Security from 1998 to 2003, from "foreign women" in Discovery Bay that the government was "allowing Filipino domestic helpers to seduce their husbands", and was accused of being sexist and racist by many media reports. The Philippines consulate expressed its concern over the "unfortunate choice of words" by Ip. A domestic helpers advocacy group demonstrated in front of her office, calling on her to apologise. She apologised to those who were offended by her and insisted that the article was misinterpreted.

=== Views on fur wearing ===
Ip was criticised by animal rights activists for wearing a red mink coat to a Legislative Council meeting in January 2016. She defended her clothing choice, saying that "wearing fur is actually the same as eating beef...Mink farming can be more humane than rearing chicken or cattle."

=== Lying about Liaison Office visit ===
On 5 September 2016 one day after the 2016 Hong Kong Legislative Council election in which she was re-elected, Ip's car was photographed at the Liaison Office. She told Ming Pao that she was not in the car and she was sending some books she wrote to her friends there. She later admitted that she lied about it as she was requested by the other party to keep the visit confidential. She was criticised as the pan-democrats had been accusing the Liaison Office for meddling in local politics and elections. She apologised to the public and Ming Pao and denied that she was there for thanking the Liaison Office for its support.

=== "Hong Kong Is China, Like It or Not" ===
On October 1, 2020, the New York Times published an opinion piece by Ip, titled "Hong Kong Is China, Like It or Not". In the piece, Ip defended the Hong Kong Police Force's actions during the 2019–20 Hong Kong protests and publicly supported the Legislative Council of Hong Kong. Ip wrote:

Something had to be done, and the Chinese authorities did it . . . The West tends to glorify these people as defenders of Hong Kong's freedoms, but they have done great harm to the city by going against its constitutional order and stirring up chaos and disaffection toward our motherland. Like it or not, Hong Kong is part of China. And given the two's vast disparity in size and Hong Kong's growing dependence on the mainland, the city's progressive integration with China is unavoidable . . . A realistic goal for Hong Kong ought to be remaining the freest and most international city in China and retaining its unique international status, thanks to the city's many bilateral agreements with foreign countries and its membership in numerous international organizations.

— Regina Ip, New York Times, excerpt from "Hong Kong Is China, Like It or Not"

The National Review and The Spectator criticized the op-ed, as did HuffPost freelance reporter Yashar Ali and CBS News correspondent Kathryn Watson.

=== BN(O) and dual citizenship ===
In October 2020, SCMP reported that Ip has previously said that if the Chinese foreign ministry imposes restrictions on Hong Kong BN(O) passports, then the Hong Kong Immigration Department may instruct airline companies to stop issuing tickets to those with BN(O) passports. In February 2021, SCMP reported that the move to ban BN(O) passports has left ethnic minorities without a valid passport, as many have encountered issues while applying for a Hong Kong passport. The move would practically stop the freedom of these Hong Kong citizens from leaving Hong Kong.

In January 2021, Ip wrote an opinion article on SCMP, stating that those with dual passports in Hong Kong should choose between their non-Hong Kong citizenship or their right of abode in Hong Kong, saying that those who choose their non-Hong Kong foreign citizenship "could also lose the right of abode in Hong Kong and the attendant right to vote in Hong Kong elections." This is despite the fact that high-level government officials, including Carrie Lam, Tam Yiu-chung, and Tung Chee-hwa have children with foreign citizenship. Ip mentions that her suggestion was just a proposal and she did not raise the issue with the Hong Kong SAR government.

In February 2021, Hong Kong Free Press reported that around 7,000 people had emigrated from Hong Kong to the UK since June 2020, with Ip claiming those people had "no money, skills or education".

In March 2021, Ip said that those in Hong Kong who use the BN(O) passport for working holiday visa applications to 14 countries should be denied the ability to fly on airlines by the government.

=== Overseas voting ===
While discussing a proposal to allow overseas Hong Kongers to vote, Ip gave her reasoning for not allowing all overseas Hong Kongers to vote, and only allowing those living in mainland China to vote. Ip said that under the "One country" principle, those who live in China should get first priority when it comes to overseas voting.

=== Separation of powers ===
In October 2020, Ip claimed that Hong Kong has never had separation of powers, and that government officials should reiterate that the city does not have it.

=== Expulsion of Legislative Council members ===
In November 2020, following the expulsion of 4 pro-democracy lawmakers in the Legislative Council, Ip defended the expulsion and said "They cannot be just democrats in name. They have to not only embrace true democratic values in the sense of respecting the rule of law and the rights of other people with whom they disagree, they also have to respect the sovereignty, security of our country." Additionally, Ip said that "Time will tell that it was the right decision to take."

=== Arrests of pro-democracy figures ===
After the arrest of 53 pro-democracy figures in January 2021, Ip defended the arrests, stating that their goal of taking control of the Legislative Council and not approving the budget would not be tolerated.

=== Xinjiang ===
In March 2021, after some companies suspended the use of cotton from Xinjiang due to human rights concerns, Ip stated that those companies were spreading lies about Xinjiang, and that she would boycott Burberry. Ip claimed that she would not wear products from the brand "until Burberry has retracted or apologised for its unfounded allegations against Xinjiang." After some people asked her to burn her scarves, Ip said that she would just "put them away for the time being".

=== RTHK ===
In 2019, Ip said that RTHK should stop producing news in Chinese. In April 2021, Ip suggested that RTHK be shut down, and said that RTHK staff "often challenge the government's bottom line."

=== LGBT and women's rights ===
Ip has expressed desires to legislate against discrimination against LGBT people and supported the city to host the 2022 Gay Games. She, however, stopped short of supporting the legalisation of same-sex marriage in Hong Kong. On other social issues, such as sexism, Ip has criticised the media for focusing on what she called "focusing on a female politician's hairstyle, clothing and make up" rather than her work and has expressed desire to reserve seats for women in election committees.

=== COVID-19 ===
In March 2022, Ip argued that "dynamic zero-Covid" would be necessary in Hong Kong.

In September 2022, Ip said that "It is difficult for the government to come up with a road map for its anti-epidemic strategies now." Ip also dismissed concerns that international businesses had left Hong Kong due to its anti-epidemic policies. In contrast, the Hong Kong General Chamber of Commerce conducted a survey, which showed that 10% of large enterprises had permanently left Hong Kong, and an additional 30% of large enterprises were considering leaving or had left in the first half of 2022. The CEO of the chamber called for an immediate lifting of all anti-epidemic entry restrictions into the city.

=== Taiwan ===
In August 2022, after senior Hong Kong government officials, including John Lee, criticized Nancy Pelosi for visiting Taiwan and threatened to assist Beijing with "all necessary measures" to defend national sovereignty, Ip said ""Those in important positions of the government must share the nation's core values on sovereignty, national security, developmental interests and territorial integrity." However, Ip made a seemingly contradictory statement and said that "Hong Kong has no role to play" in the countermeasures, and also said it was difficult to say how much power Hong Kong had on the issue.

=== Hong Kong Golf Club ===
In August 2022, Ip fought against plans to build public housing on the Fanling golf course, used by the Hong Kong Golf Club, of which Ip is a member. The plan to build housing there was generally favored by the public. Later in the month, Secretary for Development Bernadette Linn said that despite lobbying by Ip and the Hong Kong Golf Club, "The government, at this moment, is still fully committed to implementing this project and we have not changed our mind."

Despite being a member of the exclusive Hong Kong Golf Club, Ip said that she is "not a golfer", stating "I am not a golfer, but the 3 18-hole golf courses at Fanling are among the finest in Asia."

Ip also said "I hope nobody calls the golf club rich and powerful or pins that label on it. Because it is a sport facility after all."

=== Stamp duty ===
In August 2022, Ip proposed waiving double stamp duties for mainland Chinese without right of abode in the city, taxes implemented earlier to cool down demand and prices for housing in Hong Kong. The government, within hours, responded that there were no plans to implement Ip's idea, and said "Regarding reports that the government is considering the relaxation of stamp duties for property, the government clarifies that there has not been discussion on the matter, and points out clearly that there are no relevant plans." Stock prices of property developers jumped on the news, and Ip later said about the contradiction "the Bloomberg headline said the government had been considering it, so it caused some misunderstanding" and that she would "be more careful and explain things more clearly in the future for sure", without issuing an apology.

Paul Chan reaffirmed the government's position, and later announced that there would be "no plan or intention" to reduce measures to cool down demand, against Ip's suggestion.

=== Global Financial Leaders' Investment Summit ===
In October 2022, after several US lawmakers warned US financial executives to not attend the Global Financial Leaders' Investment Summit, Ip said that "There are no human rights abuses in Hong Kong and accusations of export of "illiberal world order" are totally baseless".

=== Glory to Hong Kong ===
In November 2022, Ip said that the national security law has jurisdiction outside of Hong Kong, and that Hong Kong could extradite suspects from South Korea to Hong Kong. Ip made the comments in reference to an incident where Glory to Hong Kong was played in a rugby match in South Korea. In December 2022, Ip said that representatives from Google should be summoned to the Legislative Council to explain why the song was ranked so highly, and that "If they ignore the summons, a warrant can be issued. It’s a criminal offence and offenders can be jailed up to 12 months."

=== Northern Metropolis ===
In March 2023, Ip said that the Northern Metropolis project should be prioritized over Lantau Tomorrow Vision; John Lee then responded by saying both projects would move ahead simultaneously without the need to prioritize one over the other. In April 2023, a survey showed that only 6% of Hongkongers supported Lee's idea to build both simultaneously.

=== Overseas democrats ===
In July 2023, in response to the Hong Kong government putting bounties on 8 overseas democrats, Ip said "As far as I know, some of the wanted people are very active in the UK. They hold tea parties in areas where many Hongkongers live. On the surface they are Hong Kong-style tea parties, but actually they are designed to brainwash and confuse politicians and to encourage them to condemn and sanction China." Ip also said "Sending food to the wanted people for their tea parties may also be supporting their illegal activities and the police should investigate thoroughly and stop these activities."

=== Birth rate ===
In August 2023, in response to Hong Kong's falling birth rate, Ip suggested that frozen eggs and embryos should be allowed to be stored for 55 years, up from 10 years. Doctors and other experts responded to Ip's suggestion and said that the changes would be unlikely to change the birth rate, as there was no real demand for longer storage.

=== Lionel Messi ===
In February 2024, after Lionel Messi did not participate in an exhibition match in Hong Kong, Ip said that "Hong Kong people hate Messi, Inter Miami, and the black hand behind them, for the deliberate and calculated snub to Hong Kong" and also said the government should ban him from entering Hong Kong. Messi later posted a video explaining his injury, and dismissed the idea that it was politically related.

== Personal life ==
Ip married engineer Sammy Ip Man-ho (1935–1997) in 1981. Their marriage was opposed by Sammy Ip's family. Sammy Ip was the son of Ip Ching-ping, founder of the Ching Hing Construction Company. Sammy Ip has a sister, Henrietta, who was a member of the Legislative Council (1982–1991). The couple has a daughter, Cynthia Ip Wing-yan, who was born in 1989. Sammy Ip died of liver cancer in 1997.

Ip has a personal driver.

== Property ownership ==
According to Ip's declaration of assets as of January 2022, Ip owns 2 residential units, 4 parking spaces, and 1 industrial unit in Hong Kong.

In August 2023, Ip purchased a residential property through a company and defended the practice of paying minimal stamp duty, saying the government would have changed the law if it were an "undesirable loophole" to purchase property through company share transfers.

== Internet phenomenon ==
Ip has attracted attention for a social-media "makeover" that began in 2018, when she started posting studio portraits of herself in a cheongsam or other outfits alongside festive greetings, and she later said the concept was her own idea and required actively engaging with commenters, including those who teased her, with "a thick skin".

She had posted a Diwali greeting featuring a red-and-gold sari and that her Instagram account had surpassed 50,000 followers, with supporters organising birthday celebrations and distributing self-made souvenirs in Causeway Bay.

== See also ==
- New People's Party (Hong Kong)
- Politics of Hong Kong

== Notes ==
Civic offices
Preceded by Laurence Leung	Director of Immigration; 1996–1998	Succeeded by Ambrose Lee
Political offices
Preceded by Peter Lai	Secretary for Security; 1998–2003	Succeeded by Ambrose Lee
Preceded by Bernard Charnwut Chan	Convenor of the Non-official Members of Executive Council; 2022–present	Incumbent
Party political offices
New political party	Chairman of the Savantas Policy Institute; 2006–present	Incumbent
New political party	Chairperson of New People's Party; 2011–present	Incumbent
Legislative Council of Hong Kong
Preceded by Anson Chan	Member of Legislative Council; Representative for Hong Kong Island; 2008–2021	Constituency abolished
New constituency	Member of Legislative Council; Representative for Hong Kong Island West; 2022–present	Incumbent
Order of precedence
Previous: Andrew Leung; President of the Legislative Council	Hong Kong order of precedence Convenor of the Non-official Members of the Executive Council	Succeeded by Warner Cheuk; Deputy Chief Secretary for Administration
