= Alexander Chang =

Alexander Chang Yau-hung (Chinese: 張有洪, born 1952) is a Hong Kong politician and solicitor.

Chang obtained Bachelor of Laws and Postgraduate Certificate in Laws in the United Kingdom and practices law in Hong Kong. He is also a China-Appointed Attesting Officer authorized by the Ministry of Justice of the People's Republic of China to attest and certify acts, matters and documents of legal significance occurring or emanating from Hong Kong for the use in mainland China. He is a partner of the Mak Gary, Dennis Wong & Chang law firm.

In 1985, Chang was first elected to the Central and Western District Board for Sheung Wan. Being a close ally of Maria Tam Wai-chu, he was member of the Progressive Hong Kong Society. He became the head of the Island West Office of the Liberal Democratic Federation of Hong Kong when it was formed in 1990. He advocated the reintroduction of the death penalty and immediate repatriation of the Vietnamese boat people stranded in Hong Kong, together with the dropping of the first asylum policy.

Supported by Maria Tam, he ran in the first direct election for the Legislative Council of Hong Kong in 1991 but was defeated by Yeung Sum and Huang Chen-ya of the United Democrats of Hong Kong.

He was also a member of the Sino-Hong Kong Legal Liaison Group, a body formed by professionals. He called for fostering relations with China.
