= 2000 Hong Kong Island by-election =

Legislative Council of Hong Kong election

- 10 December 2000
- Turnout: 33.27%
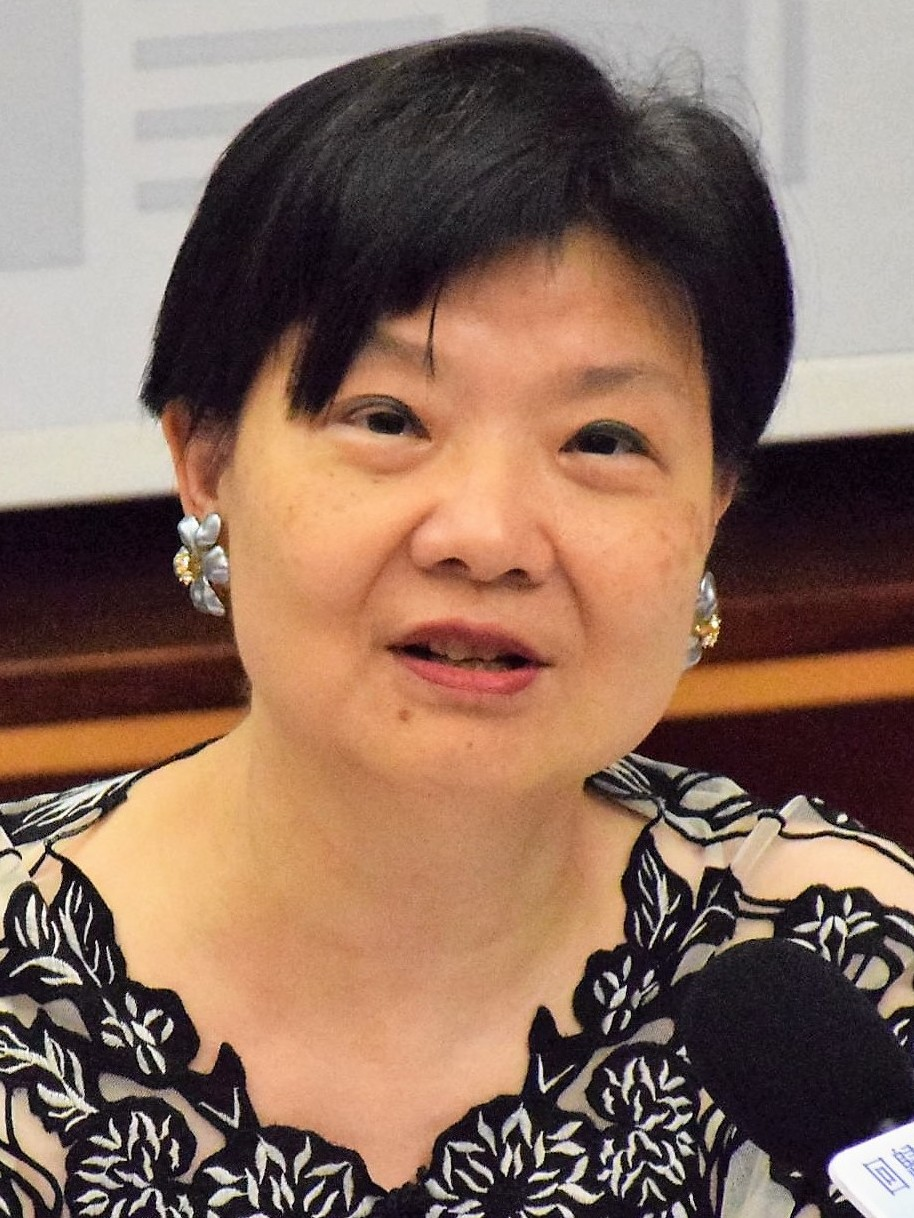

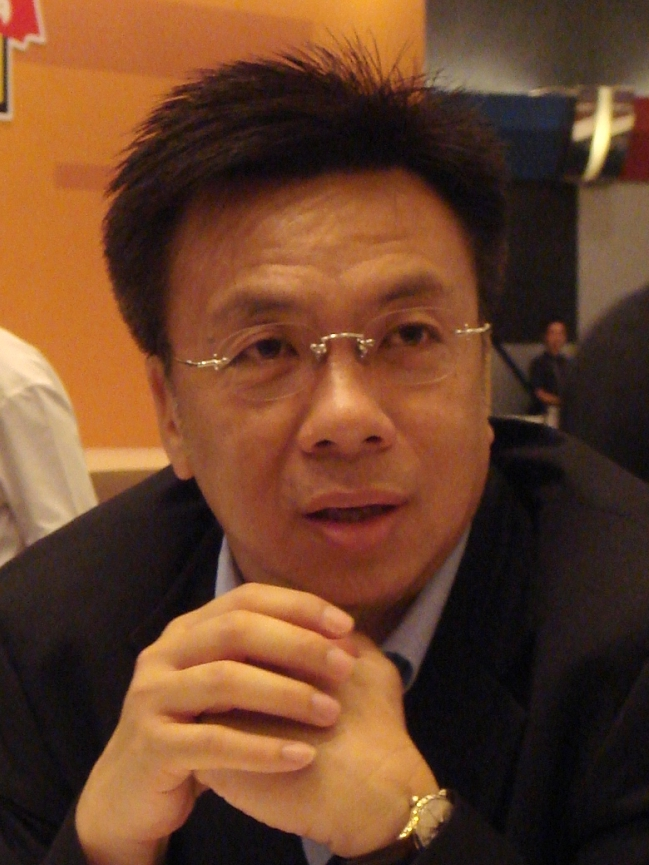
Candidate	Audrey Eu	Chung Shu-kun
Party	Independent	DAB
Alliance	Pro-democracy	Pro-Beijing
Popular vote	108,401	78,282
Percentage	52.11%	37.63%
Member before election
Gary Cheng (declined seat)
DAB
Elected Member
Audrey Eu
Independent

The Hong Kong Island by-election, 2000 was held on 10 December 2000, when then Democratic Alliance for the Betterment of Hong Kong (DAB) vice-chairman Gary Cheng declined to accept his seat as a result of a scandal. Audrey Eu, who was then running as an independent backed by the pro-democracy camp won the by-election with 52.1% of valid vote. Cheng was subsequently jailed for abuse of office.

== Result ==
Hong Kong Island by-election 2000
Party	Candidate	Votes	%	±%
Independent	Audrey Eu Yuet-mee	108,401	52.11	
DAB	Christopher Chung Shu-kun	78,282	37.23	
Independent	Jennifer Chow Kit-bing	13,717	6.59	
Independent	Paul Tse Wai-chun	5,076	0.50	
Independent	Simon Lo Ching-cheung	1,317	0.25	
Independent	Shi Kai-biu	1,231	0.19	
Majority		30,119	17.61	
Total valid votes		208,024	100.00	
Rejected ballots		648		
Turnout		208,672	33.27	
Registered electors		627,208		
Independent gain from DAB		Swing		
