= Hong Kong Island West (2021 constituency) =

Geographical constituency in Hong Kong

- Geographical constituency for the Legislative Council of Hong Kong
- Boundary of Hong Kong Island West in Hong Kong
- District: Central and Western District; Southern District; Islands District
- Region: Hong Kong Island; New Territories
- Population: 698,900
- Electorate: 374,795

Current constituency
- Created: 2021
- Number of members: Two
- Members: Chan Hok-fung (DAB); Judy Chan (NPP)
- Created from: Hong Kong Island; New Territories West (1998)

The Hong Kong Island West geographical constituency is one of the ten geographical constituencies in the elections for the Legislative Council of Hong Kong which elects two members of the Legislative Council using the single non-transferable vote (SNTV) system. The constituency covers Central and Western Districts and Southern District of Hong Kong Island and Islands District in the New Territories.

== History ==
This constituency was created under the overhaul of the electoral system imposed by the Beijing government in 2021, replacing Central and Western District and Southern District in the Hong Kong Island constituency and Islands District in the New Territories West constituency used from 1998 to 2021. Constituencies with the same name were also created for the 1991 and 1995 elections in the late colonial period, while the 1991 constituency also elected two seats with each voter having two votes with a similar boundary.

== Returning members ==
Election	Member	Party	Member	Party
2021	Regina Ip	NPP	Chan Hok-fung	DAB
2025	Judy Kapui Chan	NPP	Chan Hok-fung	DAB

== Election results ==
=== 2020s ===
2025 Legislative Council election: Hong Kong Island West
Party	Candidate	Votes	%	±%
DAB	Chan Hok-fung	30,543	29.29	−3.89
NPP	Judy Kapui Chan	30,033	28.80	−30.72
FTU	Kwok Wai-keung	25,643	24.59	
Liberal	Jeremy Young Chit-on	10,675	10.24	
Nonpartisan	Wong Chau-ping	7,384	7.08	
Total valid votes		104,278	100.00	
Rejected ballots		3,069		
Turnout		107,347	31.38	
Registered electors		342,689		
DAB hold		Swing		
NPP hold		Swing		

Vote share
1. New People's Party (59.5%)
2. DAB (33.2%)
3. Nonpartisan (7.30%)

2021 Legislative Council election: Hong Kong Island West
Party	Candidate	Votes	%	±%
NPP	Regina Ip Lau Suk-yee	65,694	59.52	
DAB	Chan Hok-fung	36,628	33.18	
Ind. democrat	Fong Lung-fei	8,058	7.30	
Total valid votes		110,380	100.00	
Rejected ballots		2,379		
Turnout		112,759	30.09	
Registered electors		374,795		
NPP win (new seat)				
DAB win (new seat)				
