= Central and Western Democratic Power =

Organization

- 中西區民主力量
- Location: Hong Kong
- Region served: Central & Western District
- Convenor: Kam Nai Wai
- Affiliations: Pro-democracy

Central and Western Democratic Power
- Traditional Chinese: 中西區民主力量
Transcriptions
Yue: Cantonese
- Yale Romanization: Jūng sāi kēui màhn jyú lihk leuhng
- Jyutping: Zung1 sai1 keoi1 man4 zyu2 lik6 loeng6

Central and Western Democratic Power is a local political group in the Central and Western district of Hong Kong. It was convened by Kam Nai Wai, a member of Democratic Party and Central and Western District Councillor, and is mainly composed of pro-democracy District Councillors of the district.

Its platform includes striving for general election of the Chief Executive in 2007 and Legislative Council in 2008, public consultation of implementation of Article 23 of the Basic Law by means of a White Bill, stopping reclamation to protect the Victoria Harbour, cutting transportation fares for elderly citizens, and other local affairs.

8 out of 10 members of the group won in the 2003 District Council elections in the Central and Western district.
