= Kam Nai-wai =

Hong Kong politician

Kam Nai-wai MH
- 甘乃威
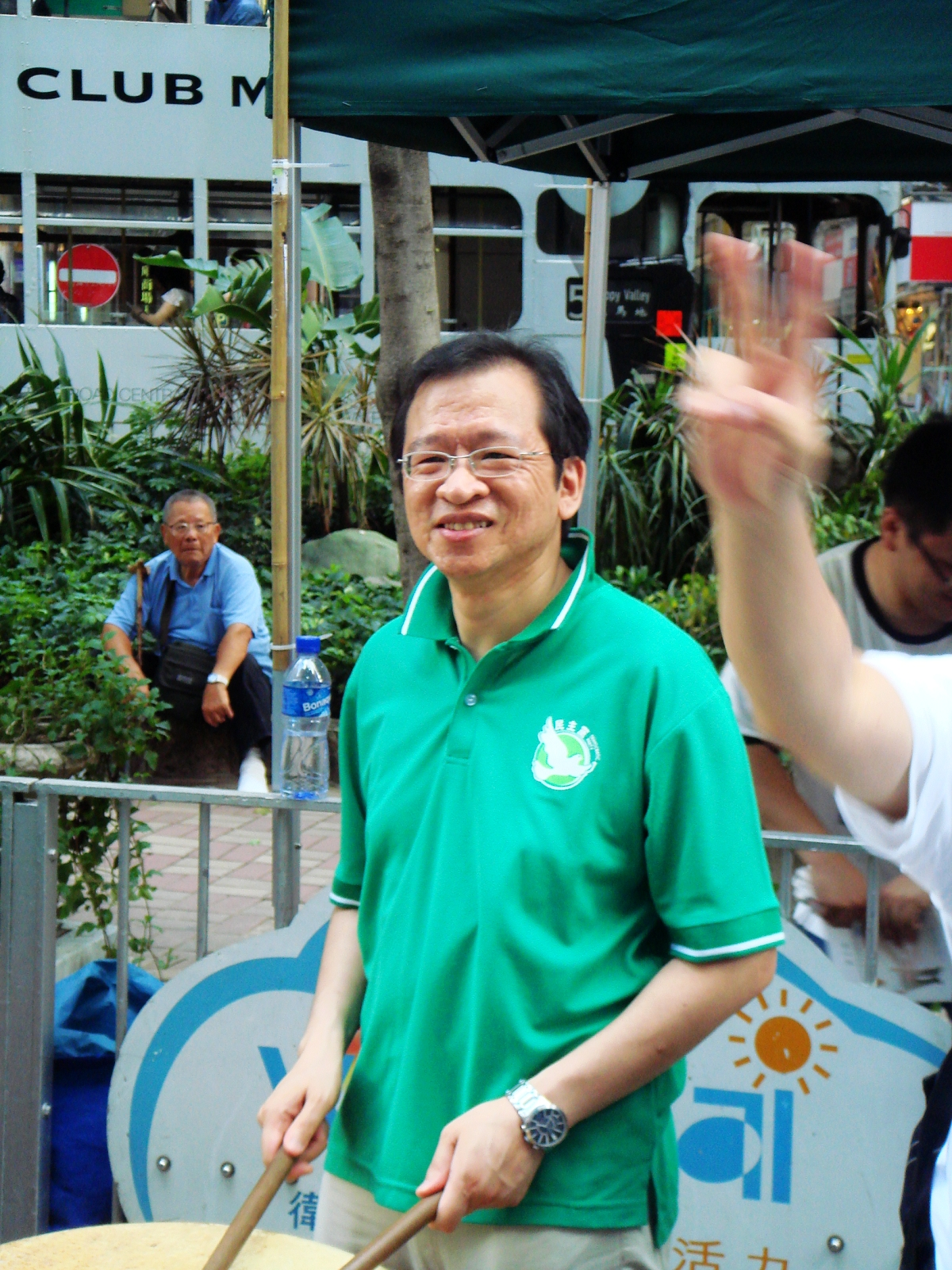
- Kam in 2008

Member of the Legislative Council of Hong Kong
- In office 1 October 2008 – 30 September 2012
- Preceded by: Yeung Sum
- Succeeded by: Sin Chung-kai
- Constituency: Hong Kong Island

Personal details
- Born: 1 November 1960 (age 65) Hong Kong
- Party: Democratic Party
- Education: City Polytechnic of Hong Kong (now: City University of Hong Kong); Hong Kong Baptist University
- Occupation: District Councillor

Kam Nai-wai
- Chinese: 甘乃威
Transcriptions
Standard Mandarin
- Hanyu Pinyin: Gān Naǐweī
Yue: Cantonese
- Jyutping: gam1 naai5 wai1

Kam Nai-wai MH (Chinese: 甘乃威; born 1960, Hong Kong) is a founding member of the Democratic Party, and was a former member of Central and Western District Council. He is also a former member of the Legislative Council of Hong Kong (Geographical constituency, Hong Kong Island). His profession is as a social worker and he is a director of an IT company.

Kam served on the former Urban Council and district councils from 1995.

== Political career ==
In 2007, Kam planned to participate in 2007 Hong Kong Island by-election after the former chairman of DAB, Ma Lik, died of colon cancer. He later withdrew from the election process, denying that it was under pressure from fellow democrats who feared splitting the vote with Anson Chan. He won praise for his support for victims of the Lehman minibonds saga in 2008.

In the 2008 Hong Kong legislative election he won the Hong Kong Island geographical constituency seat for the Democratic Party.

== Views, policy positions and Legco voting ==
In June 2010, he voted with the party in favour of the government's 2012 constitutional reform package, which included the late amendment by the Democratic Party – accepted by the Beijing government – to hold a popular vote for five new District Council functional constituencies.

== Personal life ==
Kam is married to Candy.

Political offices
Preceded by Anthony Ng; Alexander Chang	Member of the Central and Western District Council; Representative for Sheung Wan; 1994–2021	Vacant
New constituency	Member of the Urban Council; Representative for Central; 1995–1997	Replaced by Provisional Urban Council
New creation	Member of the Provisional Urban Council; 1997–1999	Council abolished
Legislative Council of Hong Kong
Preceded by Yeung Sum	Member of Legislative Council; Representative for Hong Kong Island; 2008–2012	Succeeded by Sin Chung-kai
