= Cheng Kai-nam =

Hong Kong politician (born 1950)

- Chinese: 程介南
Transcriptions
Standard Mandarin
- Hanyu Pinyin: Chéng Jiènán
Yue: Cantonese
- Jyutping: cing4 gaai3 naam4

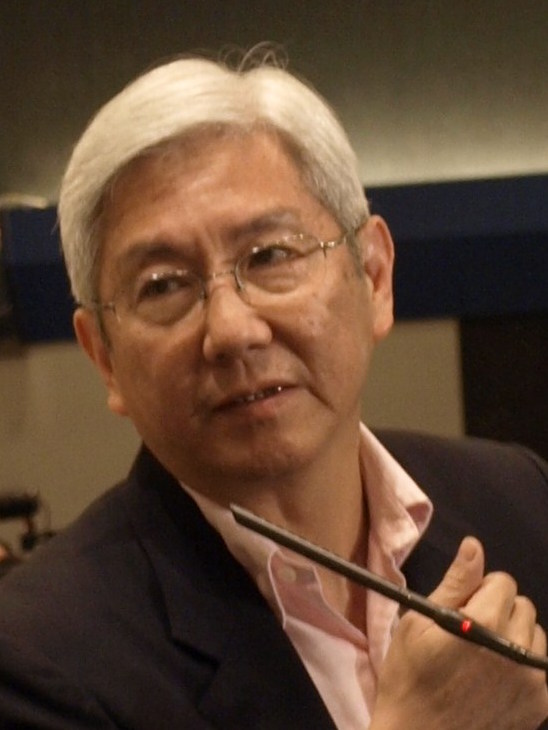
Gary Cheng

Gary Cheng Kai Nam (Chinese: 程介南, born 29 May 1950, in Hong Kong with family roots in Yangzhou, Jiangsu, China) is a Hong Kong politician who served as vice-chairman for the Democratic Alliance for the Betterment and Progress of Hong Kong party. He was educated at Pui Kiu Middle School, the University of East Anglia (BA), and the University of Hong Kong. He was a longtime member of the Legislative Council. During the legislative election in 2000, he was exposed for failing to disclose his personal own assets and became a suspect for corruption. In the end, he gave up his seat in the Legislative Council. In 2001, the court found Cheng guilty of abuse of power and sentenced him to 18 months in jail.

Legislative Council of Hong Kong
New parliament	Member of Provisional Legislative Council; 1997–1998	Replaced by Legislative Council
New parliament	Member of Legislative Council; Representative for Hong Kong Island; 1998–2000; With: Martin Lee, Yeung Sum, Christine Loh (1998–2000); Choy So-yuk, Cyd Ho (2000)	Succeeded by Audrey Eu
