= Paul Zimmerman (politician) =

Hong Kong politician

- 司馬文
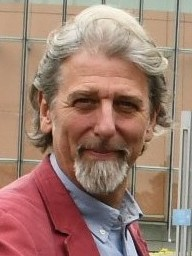
- Zimmerman in 2018

Vice Chairman of the Southern District Council
- In office 7 January 2020 – 31 December 2023
- Preceded by: Chan Fu-ming
- Succeeded by: Position abolished

Member of the Southern District Council
- In office 5 September 2010 – 31 December 2023
- Preceded by: Ronald Chan
- Succeeded by: Constituency abolished
- Constituency: Pokfulam

Personal details
- Born: 8 November 1958 (age 67) Rotterdam, South Holland, Netherlands
- Party: Civic Party (2006–12); Independent (since 2012)
- Other political affiliations: Professional Commons; Democratic Foundation
- Education: Erasmus University (MSS); University of Hong Kong (MA)
- Website: www.paulzimmerman.hk

Paul Zimmerman
- Traditional Chinese: 司馬文
- Simplified Chinese: 司马文
Transcriptions
Standard Mandarin
- Hanyu Pinyin: Sīmǎ Wén
Yue: Cantonese
- Yale Romanization: Sī Máh màhn
- Jyutping: Si^{1} Maa^{5} man^{4}

Paulus Johannes Zimmerman (born 8 November 1958), better known as Paul Zimmerman, is a Dutch-born Hong Kong politician, urban planning advocate, environmentalist and businessman. Originally from the Netherlands, he moved to Hong Kong in 1984, became a naturalized Hong Kong citizen in 2012, and has been active in civic and environmental campaigns since the 1990s. He is best known for his work on sustainable urban development, harbour conservation, and local politics, having served as vice chairman of the Southern District Council, district councillor for the Pokfulam constituency, and chairman of the Professional Commons.

He is the founder of Designing Hong Kong, a non-profit organization that advocates better urban design.

== Early life and business career ==
Zimmerman was born in Rotterdam, Netherlands in 1958 into a Jewish family, and grew up in the town of Woerden. He was one of six children until his two-year-old elder sister died to meningitis. While studying high school at Minkema College, he helped establish a student union, wrote for an underground newspaper, and became active in student politics. At the age of 17, in response to the dismissal of several popular teachers, Zimmerman took part in a demonstration in which protesters barricaded the building for a week, prompting government intervention and the replacement of the headmaster. He went on to study economics at Erasmus University in Rotterdam. While there, he campaigned for smoke-free policies on campus and got into politics with the Democrats 66.

In 1984, he moved to Hong Kong as a three-month trainee at a Dutch bank to avoid conscription. Decided against a banking career, he moved into public relations and worked for Ogilvy. By 1987, he had started his own graphic design firm, The Bridge Design Limited, with his then-wife. He sold the company in 1997 to Caribiner International, the firm organizing the handover of Hong Kong ceremony, but remained with the business until 2001. Caribiner later got acquired by Jack Morton. In 2000, he founded The Experience Group.

After leaving the company, he considered returning to the Netherlands and also explored relocating to Australia or Shanghai, but ultimately chose to remain in Hong Kong for family reasons. At the time, he was married with two son. Afterwards, he served as a non-executive director at Jebsen Travel Limited, as well as other responsibilities at Pacific Aviation Marketing and MF Jebsen Automotive until his retirement in January 2010. From 2010, he began focusing his efforts on Designing Hong Kong and the Southern District Council.

== Political career ==
=== Entry into politics ===
In 2006, lawmakers Audrey Eu Yuet-mee, Albert Lai Kwong-tak and Ronny Tong Ka-wah asked Zimmerman to join the Civic Party as a founding member. Shortly after its founding, he contested the 2006 Election Committee Subsector elections in the Tourism subsector. His aim was to help secure enough nominations for a pro-democracy candidate to contest the 2007 Chief Executive election, thereby making it a genuinely competitive race. In his first election in Hong Kong, he received 151 votes and narrowly lost by a single vote.

A year later, the 2007 District Council elections marked the Civic Party's first direct election. Zimmerman initially planned to contest the Hang Hau East constituency of the Sai Kung District Council, where his home in Clear Water Bay is located. However, as the seat had long been dominated by the Heung Yee Kuk and their indigenous New Territories representatives, he instead chose to run in the Stubbs Road constituency of the Wan Chai District Council, where he had previously participated in urban renewal projects. He received 45% of the vote and lost to the incumbent, Wong Wang-tai, by 129 votes.

Zimmerman next contested the Tourism functional constituency in the 2008 legislative election. He lost in a four-way contest to independent Paul Tse, receiving 81 votes (9.17%). Despite three consecutive electoral defeats, he remained active in the Civic Party and continued contributing to public policy debates. In early 2010, he joined members of the Professional Commons in opposing the Express Rail Link project. During the campaign, he attended a press conference organized by the pro-rail Association of Engineering Professionals in Society in an attempt to deliver a letter to its vice-chairman, Yim Kin-ping, and invite the engineering sector to a public debate, but was promptly escorted from the venue.

=== Election to the District Council ===
Following Ronald Chan Ngok-pang's resignation to become a special assistant in the Office of the Chief Executive in 2010, Zimmerman contested the resulting Pokfulam by-election as the Civic Party candidate. He was endorsed by leading pan-democratic figures including Albert Ho, Cyd Ho, Cheung Kwok-che, Avery Ng, and Southern District councillor Chai Man-hon. Despite this support, Pokfulam was considered a pro-establishment stronghold, and his opponent, Lau Ying-tung, was backed by Regina Ip and Ocean Park chairman Allan Zeman.

The day before the election, an altercation between the two campaigns led to Zimmerman's arrest after one of Lau's campaign workers accused him of assault, despite Zimmerman claiming to have video evidence showing the incident was staged. He was later not prosecuted. Zimmerman went on to win the by-election with 1,183 votes, nearly 400 more than Lau, becoming Hong Kong's only foreign-born elected district councillor at the time. After taking office, Zimmerman left the private sector and devoted himself full-time to public service, focusing on improving public transport services, pedestrian facilities, road safety, cycling infrastructure, urban planning, and harbourfront development. He later said the district council's ability to pursue meaningful reform was limited by Hong Kong's entrenched bureaucracy. Nevertheless, he sought re-election in the 2011 District Council elections, facing Yim Kin-ping, whom he had confronted during the anti-Express Rail Link campaign. Zimmerman was re-elected with 1,445 votes, securing 64.2% of the vote.

=== Departure from the Civic Party ===
After becoming a district councillor, Zimmerman hoped to enter the Legislative Council through the newly created District Council (Second) functional constituency, the so-called "super seats", (Note: Chinese 超級區議會) in the 2012 legislative election. However, it was restricted to Chinese nationals with no right of abode in a foreign country. In November 2011, he therefore applied to the Immigration Department to become a naturalized Chinese citizen. Frustrated by the slow processing, he publicly urged the department to expedite the procedure. However, the Civic Party decided not to contest the "super seats" before his naturalization application would have been approved in June 2012. The party instead asked him to stand on its Hong Kong Island candidate list behind Kenneth Chan Ka-lok and Tanya Chan. Believing that this would significantly reduce his chances of election and hurt other Hong Kong Island candidates, Zimmerman refused and left the Civic Party to pursue his own candidacy as an independent. However, he failed to secure the required fifteen nominations from district councillors to stand in the election and instead endorsed Frederick Fung of the ADPL to ensure that the pro-democracy camp would secure three "super seats".

Following his naturalization as a Chinese citizen, Zimmerman became eligible to contest the 2012 National People's Congress election. He argued that, despite the National People's Congress (NPC) serving as China's national legislature, its work attracted little public attention in Hong Kong. By standing in the election, he hoped to bring discussion of the NPC into Hong Kong society while also representing the interests of Hong Kong's younger generation at the national level. Although he secured nominations from more than 15 eligible electors, he was widely expected to lose because the Election Committee was dominated by pro-establishment members. He lost with 226 votes, placing 50th out of 52 candidates.

After leaving the Civic Party, Zimmerman continued serving as district councillor as an independent. During his first full term after re-election, he continued promoting cycling and improving pedestrian infrastructure while also addressing community issues in Pokfulam, Cyberport, and surrounding areas relating to roads, transport, public infrastructure, and commercial facilities. During the Umbrella Movement, Zimmerman attended the National Day reception as a Southern District councillor wearing a yellow ribbon. At the official toast, he raised a yellow umbrella instead of a wine glass in protest against the Hong Kong government's handling of the protests, and called on Chief Executive Leung Chun-ying to apologize to the students.

=== Post-Umbrella Movement ===
In the 2015 District Council elections, Zimmerman faced a challenge from Liberal Party's Jeremy Yeung Chit-on, a former political assistant to the Secretary for Education. Yeung criticized Zimmerman's support for the Umbrella Movement and argued that his experience in government would make him a more effective district councillor. Zimmerman replied that Yeung had only appeared in Pokfulam shortly before the election and pointed to his own record in office, saying he did not regard Yeung as a serious electoral threat. Zimmerman was re-elected as Southern District councillor for the Pokfulam constituency with 1,952 votes, or 63.1% of the vote.

In May 2015, Ronny Tong founded the think tank Path of Democracy (PoD) to study the future of the "one country, two systems" framework and invited Zimmerman to join. After joining, he served for a time as a member of the board. However, when PoD began considering fielding candidates in the 2016 legislative election, he concluded that the think tank had evolved into a political party, contrary to the purpose for which he had joined, and resigned in January 2016.

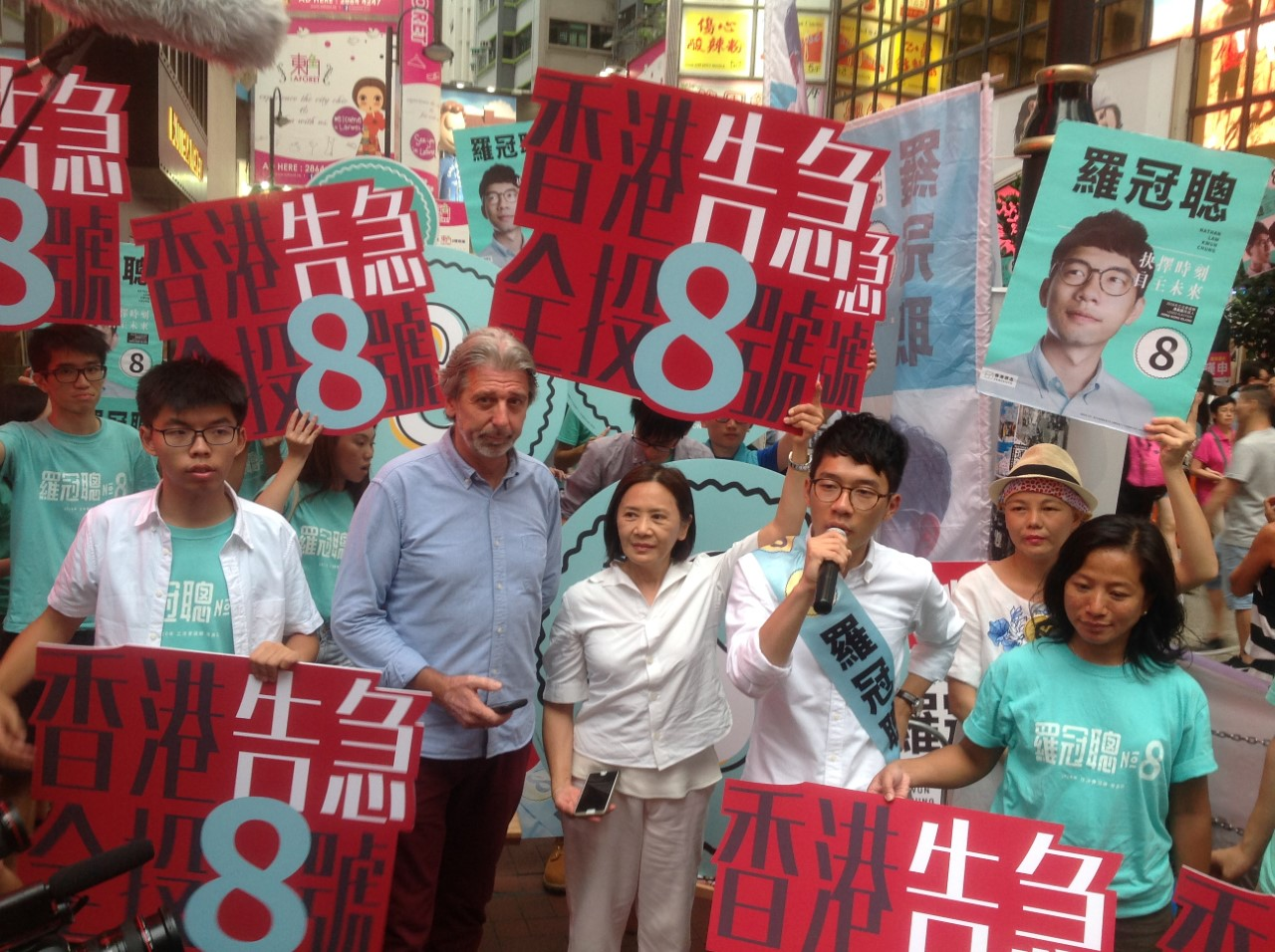
Zimmerman campaigning for 2016 Legislative Council candidate Nathan Law alongside Joshua Wong, Deanie Ip and Nathan himself.

In 2016, Zimmerman initially sought to contest the "super seats" in the 2016 legislative election, but was again unable to secure enough nominations. He then switched to the Hong Kong Island constituency and formed alliance with Eddie Chu of the Land Justice League, who was contesting New Territories West. As his support remained low, Zimmerman withdrew from the race shortly before polling day to avoid splitting the vote among pro-democratic candidates, and he instead endorsed Demosisto candidate Nathan Law, campaigning for him during the election. Although he had withdrawn, his name remained on the ballot, and he received 2,550 votes, while both Law and Chu were elected in their respective constituencies.

He once again sought election in the 2016 Hong Kong Election Committee Subsector elections, this time in the Architectural, Surveying, Planning and Landscape Subsector. Of the 30 winners, Zimmerman had the most votes, 2524. He joined 20 other electors (from the 1,194 total) in nominating former judge Woo Kwok-hing for Chief Executive in the small-circle 2017 election.

In the 2019 District Council election, Zimmerman successfully won his re-election bid in the Pokfulam constituency, with 2,547 votes. He is vice-chairman of the Southern District Council.

Unlike most of the local councillors and legislators, Zimmerman uses few banners in promotion, and when he does they are usually smaller and much thinner.

Contested Elections
| 2006 | Election Committee | Tourism Subsector | Civic Party | Lost |
| 2007 | Wan Chai District Council | Stubbs Road Constituency | Civic Party | Lost |
| 2008 | Legislative Council | Tourism Constituency | Civic Party | Lost |
| 2010 | Southern District Council | Pokfulam Constituency | Civic Party | Won |
| 2011 | Southern District Council | Pokfulam Constituency | Civic Party | Won |
| 2012 | Legislative Council | District Council (Second) | Unaffiliated | Lost |
| 2015 | Southern District Council | Pokfulam Constituency | Unaffiliated | Won |
| 2016 | Legislative Council | Hong Kong Island Constituency | Unaffiliated | Dropped out |
| 2016 | Election Committee | Architectural, Surveying, Planning & Landscape Subsector | CoVision16 | Won |
| 2019 | Southern District Council | Pokfulam Constituency | Unaffiliated | Won |

== Social and environmental activism ==
=== Designing Hong Kong ===
In the early 2000s, Zimmerman worked alongside businessman Chung Po-yan on a project that later became Designing Hong Kong Harbourfront District, a non-governmental organization devoted to improving Hong Kong's waterfronts and promoting liveable density. The Government set up the Harbourfront Enhancement Committee in 2004. The project later evolved into Designing Hong Kong Limited, founded by him together with Christine Loh, Peter Wong and Markus Shaw.

Through Designing Hong Kong, Zimmerman has campaigned to improve pedestrian connectivity by advocating the restoration of missing pedestrian links and launching the Missing Links project to identify gaps and deficiencies in Hong Kong's pedestrian network. His advocacy contributed to the reopening of a historic footpath between Kong Sin Wan Road and Victoria Road in Pok Fu Lam.

=== Others ===
He is currently the vice-chairman of the Coalition on Sustainable Tourism and Chairman of the Single-Use Beverage Packaging Working Group, best known for its initiative Drink Without Waste. He is also director of the Civic Exchange. He is an Honorary Member of the American Institute of Architects for his work on the harbourfront.

== Personal life ==
He has married twice. With his first wife, he has two sons, born in 1993 and 1995. When he renounced Dutch citizenship during his short-lived LegCo bid, his younger son also lost his. He married his second wife Jannie in 2012. The couple had a daughter, born two years earlier.

== Notes ==
Political offices
| Preceded by Ronald Chan | Member of the Southern District Council; Representative for Pokfulam; 2010–2023 | Succeeded by Constituency abolished |
| Preceded by Chan Fu-ming | Vice Chairman of the Southern District Council; 2020–2023 | Succeeded by Position abolished |
