= 2016 Hong Kong legislative election in Hong Kong Island =

- 4 September 2016

All 6 Hong Kong Island seats to the Legislative Council
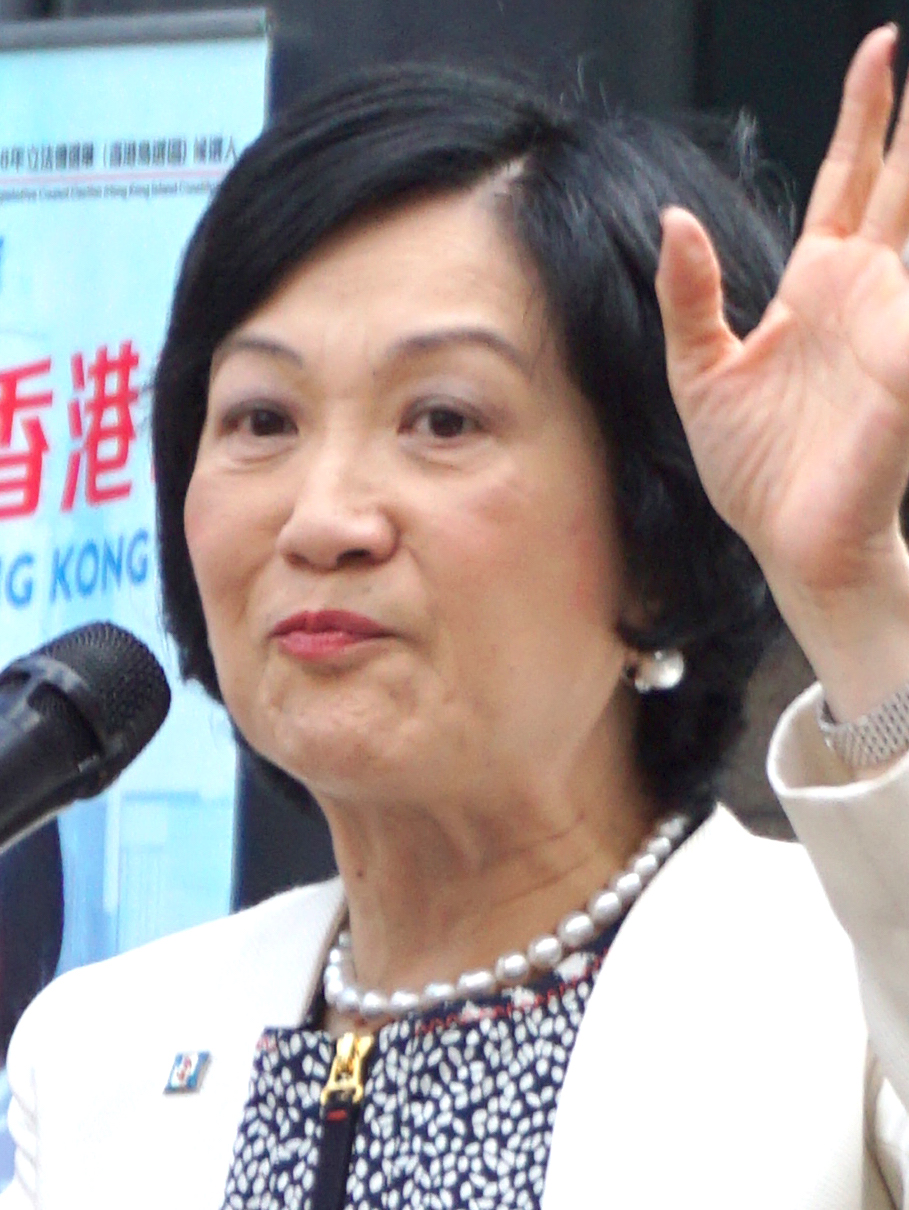

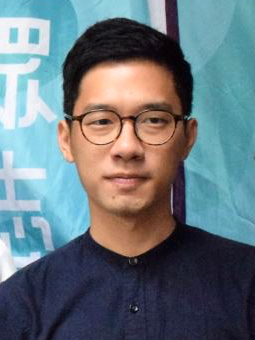

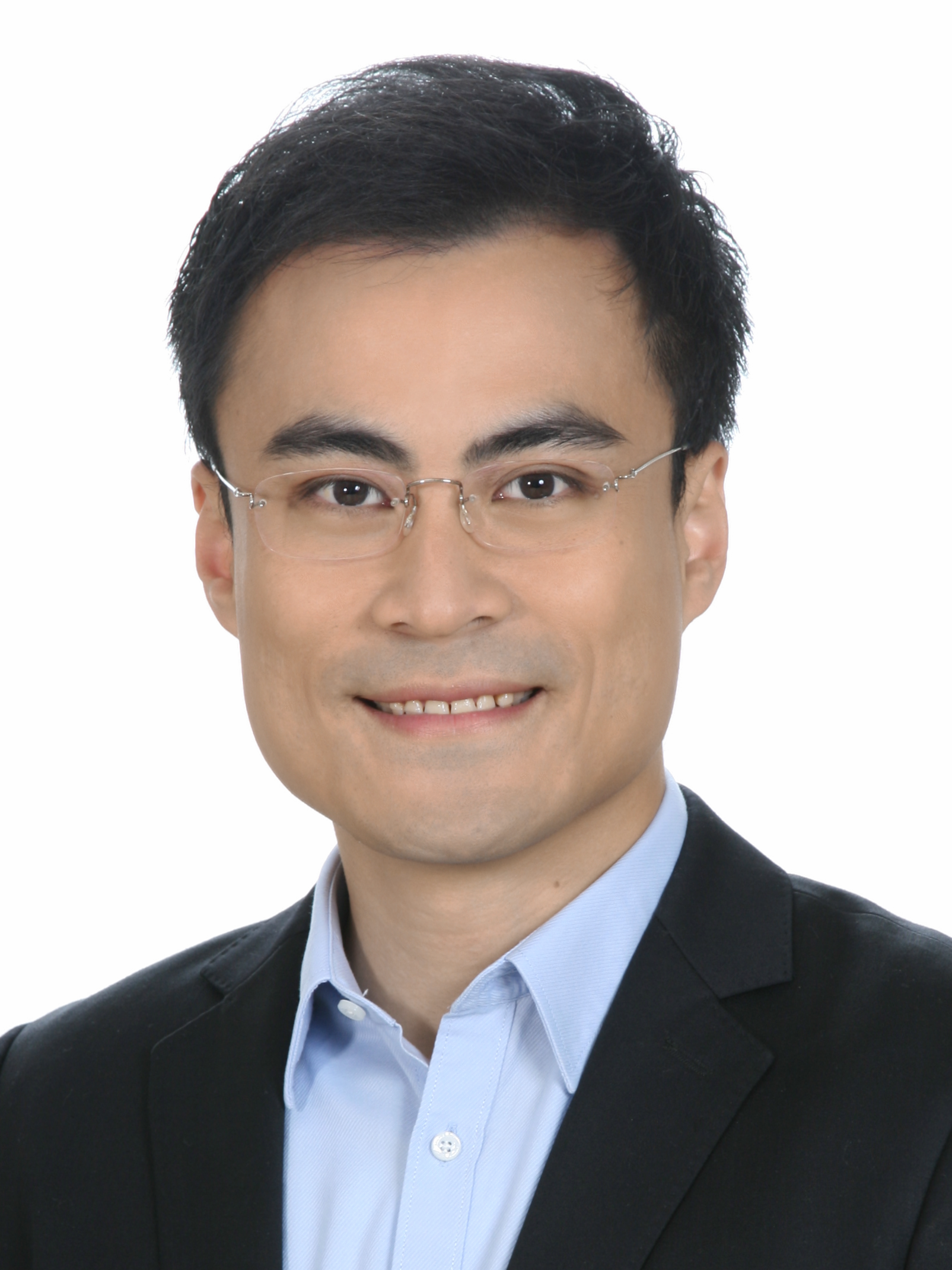

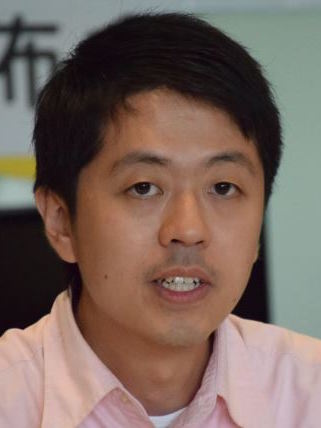

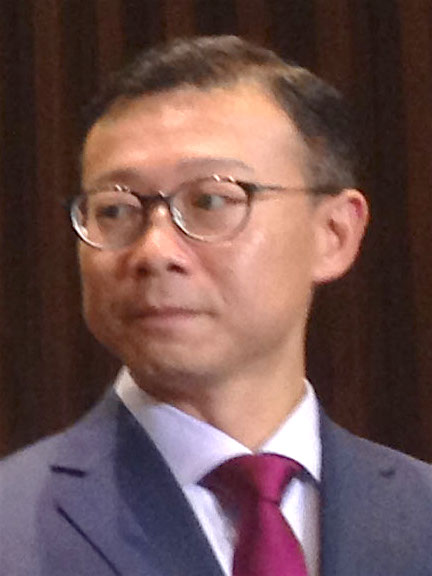

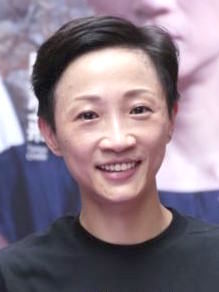
	First party	Second party	Third party
Leader	Regina Ip	Nathan Law	Kwok Wai-keung
Party	NPP	Demosisto	FTU
Alliance	Pro-Beijing	N/A	Pro-Beijing
Last election	1 seat, 9.2%	New party	1 seat, 8.3%
Seats before	1	0	1
Seats won	1	1	1
Seat change	Steady	▲1	Steady
Popular vote	60,760	50,818	45,925
Percentage	16.1%	13.5%	12.2%
Swing	▲7.0%	N/A	▲3.9%
	Fourth party	Fifth party	Sixth party
Leader	Hui Chi-fung	Horace Cheung	Tanya Chan
Party	Democratic	DAB	Civic
Alliance	Pan-democracy	Pro-Beijing	Pan-democracy
Last election	1 seat, 12.3%	2 seats, 21.3%	1 seat, 21.3%
Seats before	1	2	1
Seats won	1	1	1
Seat change	Steady	▼1	Steady
Popular vote	42,499	41,152	35,404
Percentage	11.3%	10.9%	9.4%
Swing	▼1.0%	▼11.7%	▼11.9%
- Party with most votes in each District Council Constituency.

These are the Hong Kong Island results of the 2016 Hong Kong Legislative Council election. The election was held on 4 September 2016 and all 6 seats in Hong Kong Island were contested, one lesser than 2012. The pro-Beijing camp and the anti-establishment camp split evenly by winning three seats each, with 23-year-old post-Occupy student leader Nathan Law of Demosisto became the youngest ever elected candidate. Tanya Chan returned to the Legislative Council by securing the last seat over non-partisan businessmen Ricky Wong.

== Overall results ==
Before election:

↓
3	4
Anti-establishment	Pro-establishment

Change in composition:

↓
3	3
Anti-establishment	Pro-establishment

Party	Seats	Seats change	Contesting list(s)	Votes	%	% change
NPP	1	0	1	60,760	16.1	+7.0
FTU	1	0	1	45,925	12.2	+3.9
DAB	1	–1	1	41,152	10.9	–11.6
Independent	0	0	1	2,587	0.7	N/A
Pro-Beijing camp	3	–1	4	150,424	40.0	–5.0
Democratic	1	0	1	42,499	11.3	−1.0
Civic	1	0	1	35,404	9.4	−11.9
Labour	0	–1	1	19,376	5.2	−4.4
People Power	0	0	1	7,276	1.9	N/A
Independent	0	0	2	3,220	0.9	N/A
Pro-democracy camp	2	−1	6	88,399	23.5	−31.4
Demosisto	1	+1	1	50,818	13.5	N/A
Civic Passion	0	0	1	22,555	6.0	N/A
Localist groups	1	+1	2	73,373	19.5	
PoD	0	0	1	10,028	2.7	N/A
Independent	0	0	2	34,977	9.3	N/A
Turnout:				376,577	60.7	+5.6

== Candidates list ==
Vote share
1. NPP (16.1%)
2. Demosisto (13.5%)
3. FTU (12.2%)
4. Democratic (11.3%)
5. DAB (10.9%)
6. Civic (9.40%)
7. Civic Passion (5.99%)
8. Labour (5.15%)
9. Path of Democracy (2.66%)
10. People Power (1.93%)
11. Other (10.8%)

Legislative Election 2016: Hong Kong Island
List	Candidates	Votes	Of total (%)	± from prev.
NPP	Regina Ip Lau Suk-yee Judy Chan Ka-pui, Joey Lee Man-lung, Tse Tsz-kei, Hung Lung-chuen, Gigi Wong Ching-chi	60,760	16.13	+6.97
Demosisto	Nathan Law Kwun-chung	50,818	13.49	N/A
FTU	Kwok Wai-keung Ng Chau-pei, Stanely Ho Ngai-kam, Lui Hung-pan, Chan Wing-yan	45,925	12.20	+3.94
Democratic	Hui Chi-fung Sin Chung-kai	42,499	11.29	–0.97
DAB	Cheung Kwok-kwan Christopher Chung Shu-kun, Jacqueline Chung Ka-man, Ada Mak Tse How-ling, Eddie Ting Kong-ho, Dominic Wong Chi-chung	41,152	10.93	–11.66
Civic	Tanya Chan Cheng Tat-hung	35,404	9.40	–11.91
Nonpartisan	Ricky Wong Wai-kay	33,323	8.85	N/A
Civic Passion	Cheng Kam-mun, Bonix Chung Yuen-wan	22,555	5.99	N/A
Labour	Cyd Ho Sau-lan, Mak Tak-ching, Cheng Sze-lut	19,376	5.15	–4.38
PoD	Gary Wong Chi-him	10,028	2.66	N/A
People Power	Christopher Lau Gar-hung, Erica Yuen Mi-ming	7,276	1.93	–3.71
Nonpartisan	Chim Pui-chung	2,587	0.69	N/A
Ind. democrat	Paulus Johannes Zimmerman	2,550	0.68	N/A
Nonpartisan	Shum Chee-chiu	1,654	0.44	N/A
Nonpartisan	Chui Chi-kin	670	0.18	N/A
Total valid votes		376,577	100.00	
Rejected ballots		4,753		
Turnout		381,330	60.74	+5.61
Registered electors		627,807		

== See also ==
- Legislative Council of Hong Kong
- Hong Kong legislative elections
- 2016 Hong Kong legislative election
