= Pokfulam (constituency) =

Constituency of the Southern District Council of Hong Kong

- Former elected constituency for the Southern District Council
- Boundary of Pokfulam in Southern District
- District: Southern
- Legislative Council constituency: Hong Kong West (1991 to 1995); Hong Kong Island (1998 to 2016); Hong Kong Island West (2021)
- Population: 20,748 (2019)
- Electorate: 6,450 (2019)

Former constituency
- Created: 1982
- Abolished: 2023
- Number of members: One (1982, 1994 to 2019); Two (1985 to 1991)
- Member: Paulus Johannes Zimmerman (Independent)

Pokfulam was one of the constituencies of the Southern District Council of Hong Kong between 1982 and 2019. In 1985 and since 1994 the seat elected one member of the council. Since 1999 elections were held every four years. It was last held by Independent Paulus Johannes Zimmerman, since the 2010 by-election until 2023.

In 1994 Chi Fu Fa Yuen and Pokfulam Gardens became a separate constituency. The Pokfulam constituency, one of the seventeen constituencies in the Southern District Council since 1994, loosely covered the Pok Fu Lam area, with an estimated population of 21,476 in 2011. In the 2023 election it was subsumed into the Southern District Northwest geographical constituency.

== Councillors represented ==
=== 1982 to 1985 ===
Election	Member	Party
1982	Kwok Wai-ming	Independent

=== 1985 to 1994 ===
Election	Member	Party	Member	Party
1985	Kwok Wai-ming	Civic Association	Ko Tam-kan	Civic Association
1988	Lee Man-ho	HKAS	Ko Tam-kan	Civic Association
1991	Lai Hok-lim	United Democrats	Ko Tam-kan	Independent

=== 1994 to present ===
Election	Member	Party
1994	Ko Tam-kan	Independent
2007	Ronald Chan Ngok-pang	Independent
2010 by-election	Paulus Johannes Zimmerman	Civic
2012	Paulus Johannes Zimmerman	Independent democrat

== Election results ==
=== 2010s ===
Southern District Council Election, 2019: Pokfulam
Party	Candidate	Votes	%	±%
Ind. democrat	Paulus Johannes Zimmerman	2,547	55.97	−7.03
DAB	Siu Wai-chung	1,840	40.43	
Nonpartisan	Maxine Yao Jie-ning	164	3.60	
Majority		707	15.54	
Turnout		4,557	70.65	
Ind. democrat hold		Swing		

Southern District Council Election, 2015: Pokfulam
Party	Candidate	Votes	%	±%
Ind. democrat	Paulus Johannes Zimmerman	1,952	63.0	–1.2
Liberal	Jeremy Young Chit-on	1,144	37.0	
Majority		808	16.0	
Turnout		3,112	53.9	
Independent hold		Swing		

Southern District Council Election, 2011: Pokfulam
Party	Candidate	Votes	%	±%
Civic	Paulus Johannes Zimmerman	1,445	64.2	+4.3
Independent	Yim Kin-ping	805	35.8	
Majority		640	28.4	
Civic hold		Swing		

Pokfulam by-election, 2010
Party	Candidate	Votes	%	±%
Civic	Paulus Johannes Zimmerman	1,183	59.9	
Independent	Ellis Lau	792	40.1	
Majority		491	19.8	
Civic gain from Independent		Swing		

=== 2000s ===
Southern District Council Election, 2007: Pokfulam
Party	Candidate	Votes	%	±%
Independent	Ronald Chan Ngok-pang	1,067	63.8	
Independent	Kenith Poon Kin-ming	605	36.2	
Majority		462	27.6	N/A
Independent hold		Swing		

Southern District Council Election, 2003: Pokfulam
Party	Candidate	Votes	%	±%
Independent	Ko Tam-kan	Unopposed		
Independent hold		Swing		

=== 1990s ===
Southern District Council Election, 1999: Pokfulam
Party	Candidate	Votes	%	±%
Independent	Ko Tam-kan	Unopposed		
Independent hold		Swing		

Southern District Board Election, 1994: Pokfulam
Party	Candidate	Votes	%	±%
Independent	Ko Tam-kan	Unopposed		
Independent hold		Swing		

Southern District Board Election, 1991: Pokfulam
Party	Candidate	Votes	%	±%
United Democrats	Lai Hok-lim	1,928	54.5	
Independent	Ko Tam-kan	1,611	45.6	−5.6
LDF	Kwok Wai-ming	1,417	40.1	−9.8
United Democrats hold		Swing		
Independent hold		Swing		

=== 1980s ===
Southern District Board Election, 1988: Pokfulam
Party	Candidate	Votes	%	±%
HKAS	Lee Man-ho	1,940	64.8	
Civic	Ko Tam-kan	1,534	51.2	
Civic	Kwok Wai-ming	1,495	49.9	
HKAS gain from Civic		Swing		
Civic hold		Swing		

Southern District Board Election, 1985: Pokfulam
Party	Candidate	Votes	%	±%
Civic	Kwok Wai-ming	Unopposed		
Civic	Ko Tam-kan	Unoppposed		
Civic hold		Swing		
Civic win (new seat)				

Southern District Board Election, 1982: Pokfulam
Party	Candidate	Votes	%	±%
Independent	Kwok Wai-ming	1,454	41.1	
Independent	Ko Tam-kan	714	20.2	
Independent	Wong Man-kit	551	15.6	
Independent	Leung Wai-sum	410	11.6	
Civic	Wong Chi-hung	296	8.4	
Independent	Choi Cheung-man	100	2.8	
Independent win (new seat)				
