= Chi Fu =

Chi Fu or Chi-Fu may refer to:

- Chi Fu Fa Yuen, a private housing estate in the Southern District, Hong Kong
- Chi Fu (constituency), constituency in the Southern District, Hong Kong
- Chi-Fu (Disney character), character in the Disney film Mulan
- Yantai, prefecture-level city in Shandong, People's Republic of China
