= Kuan Hsin-chi =

Kuan Hsin Chi
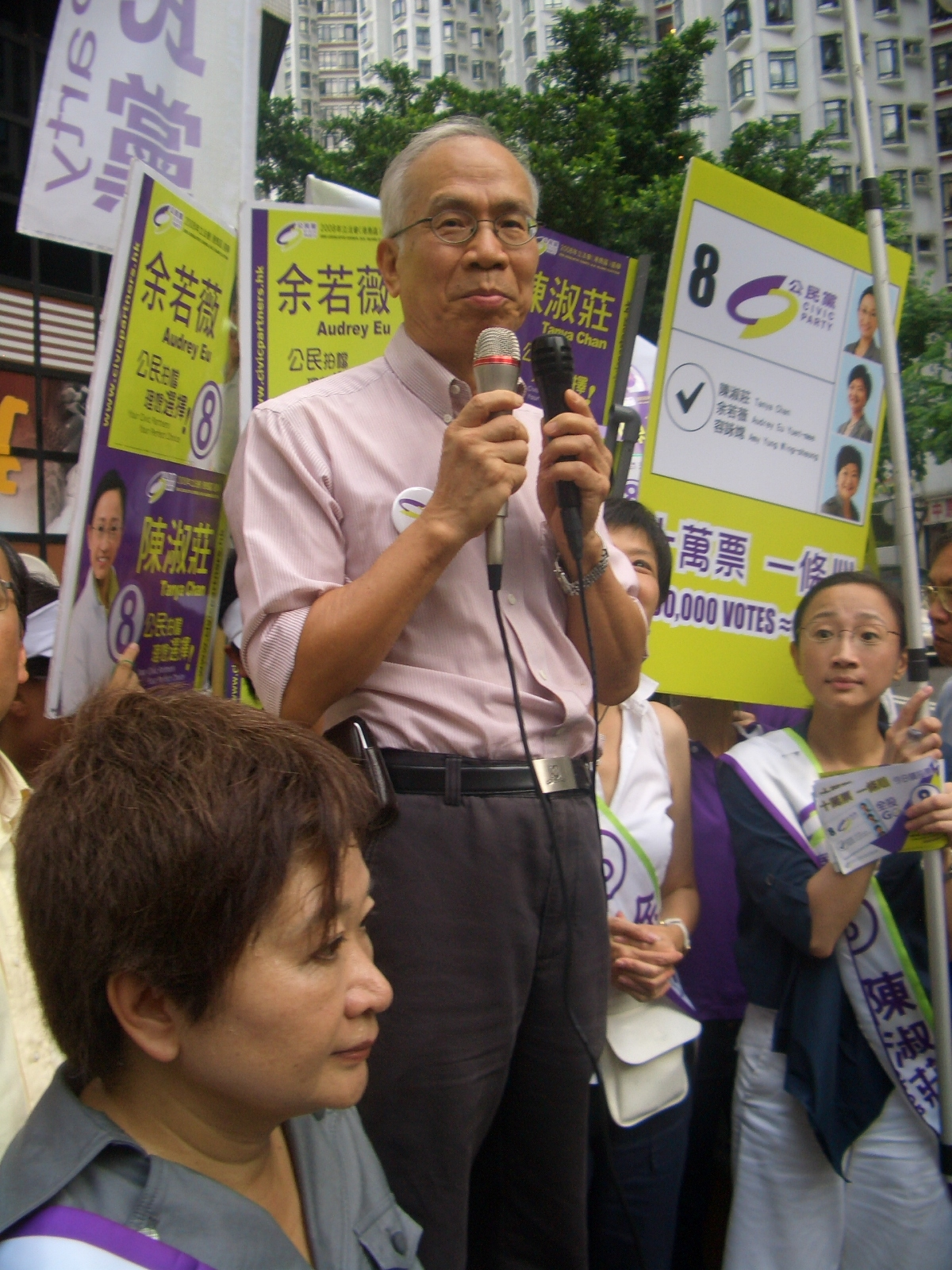

Chairman of the Civic Party
- In office 2006–2011
- Leader: Alan Leong

Personal details
- Party: Civic Party
- Education: Yuet Wah College; National Chengchi University; Free University of Berlin; LMU Munich
- Occupation: Emeritus Professor; Faculty head of Social Science; Dean of the Chinese University of Hong Kong
- Website: cuhk.edu.hk/gpa/hckuan/main.htm

Kuan Hsin Chi (Chinese: 關信基) is chairman of the Department of Government and Public Administration at the Chinese University of Hong Kong (CUHK). He retired in 2006 but continues to teach political science part-time. He was chairman of the Hong Kong Civic Party from its foundation in 2006 until 2011.

Kuan, affectionately known as "Ah Gwan" (阿關), was born in Macau and graduated from Yuet Wah College (粵華中學) there. After gaining his PhD degree from LMU Munich in 1972, he planned to take up teaching in Taiwan but was invited to teach at CUHK instead, where he spent his entire academic career until retirement.

During his 33-year career, as well as teaching political science Kuan was also dean of the Faculty of Social Sciences and the university dean of students. Currently, he is the director of the Universities Service Centre and a member of the University Council.

His main research interests are political and legal culture and development, comparative politics, research methodology, political parties, and development of political science. He is one of the most widely respected scholars in Hong Kong.

He has always believed that full democracy is the only way to rebuild Hong Kong. Thinking that today's political parties are insufficient to achieve this aim, he helped found the Civic Party (公民黨), drawings its members from Legco legislators of the Article 45 Concern Group.

== Political views ==
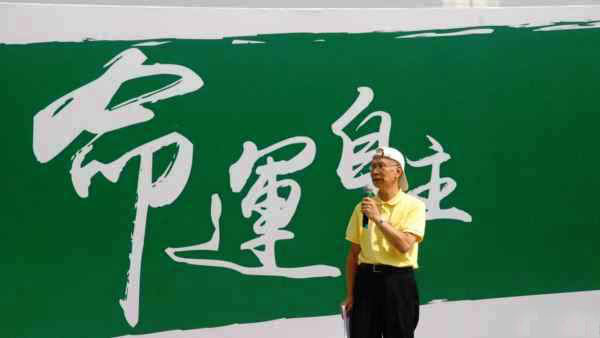
Kuan Hsin-chi addressing the 2014 Hong Kong protests

As chairman of the Civic Party, Kuan is naturally pro-democratic rights. However, he caused controversy whilst speaking on Commercial Radio on 1 April 2006. On the topic of the Tiananmen Square protests of 1989, he said that focusing on the still-controversial event would adversely affect democratic development in Hong Kong, which should come first. This view contrasts with those of most in the pro-democratic camp, and drawing criticism from the more radical Leung Kwok Hung (梁國雄), a.k.a. "Long Hair" (長毛).

Party political offices
New political party	Chairman of Civic Party; 2006–2011	Succeeded by Kenneth Chan
