= 2006 Hong Kong Election Committee Subsector elections =

Election Committee elections held on 10 December 2006 in Hong Kong

2006 Election Committee subsector elections
- 10 December 2006

664 (of the 800) seats in the Election Committee 401 seats needed for a majority
- Registered: 220,307 ▲23.06%
- Turnout: 56,142 (27.43%) ▲7.94pp
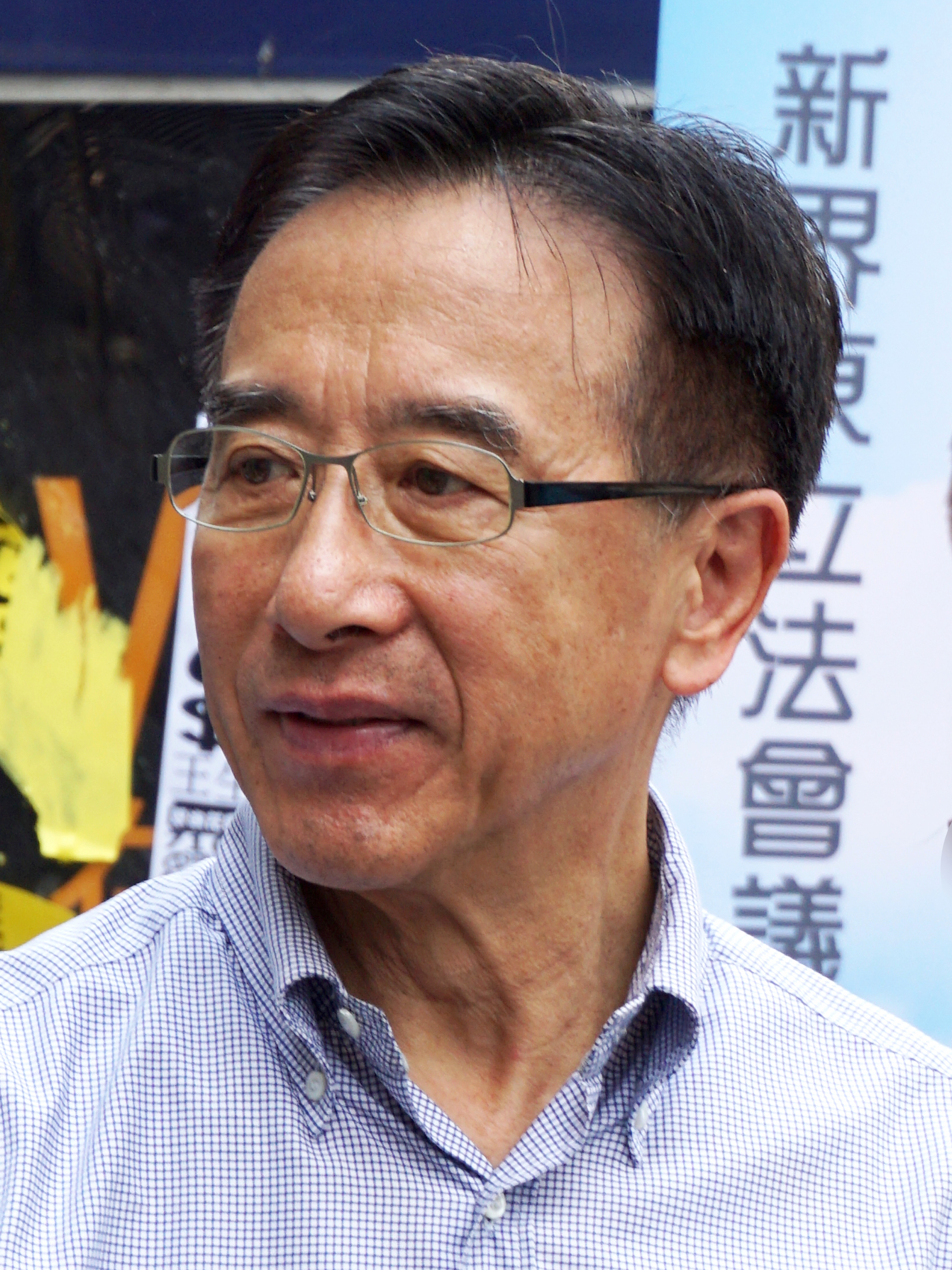

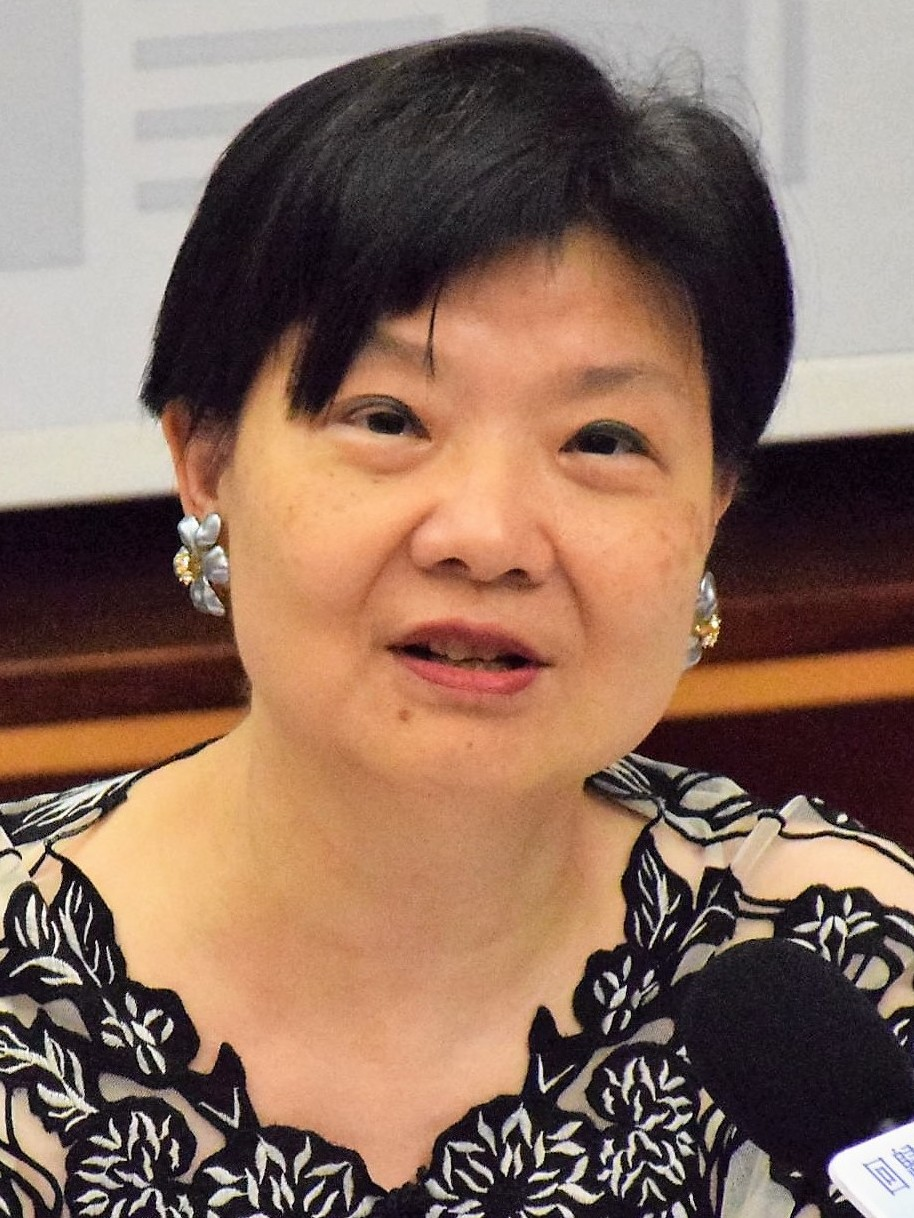

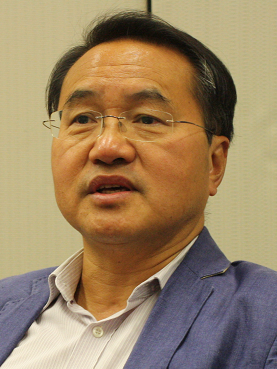
	First party	Second party
	DAB
Leader	Ma Lik	James Tien
Party	DAB	Liberal
Alliance	Pro-Beijing camp	Pro-Beijing camp
Seats won	40	21
	Third party	Fourth party
Leader	Audrey Eu	Lee Wing-tat
Party	Civic	Democratic
Alliance	Pro-democracy camp	Pro-democracy camp
Seats won	19	15

The 2006 Election Committee subsector elections were held from 7.30 am to 10.30 pm on 10 December 2006 in order to elect 664 members of Election Committee. The Election Committee was responsible for electing the Hong Kong SAR Chief Executive in 2007 Chief Executive Election.

== Background ==
In 2002, Tung Chee-hwa who failed from favour with many Hong Kong people was elected as Chief Executive of Hong Kong in the 2002 poll which the pro-democracy camp boycotted. This time, however, the pro-democracy decided to take part in the Chief Executive election in an attempt to force candidates to care more about the people's livelihood and prevent Donald Tsang reelected uncontested. After discussion, the camp decided that Alan Leong would run as a representative of the camp. As a result, the camp tried hard to gain at least 100 representatives of theirs to get the nomination threshold to enter the race.

== Election methods ==
The General qualifications for candidature are a registered geographical constituency elector; and a registered voter of the concerned subsector or has a substantial connection with that subsector. 5 subscribers are required for nomination of the concerned subsector.

== Composition ==
The 800-member Election Committee was composed of 664 members elected from 35 subsectors; 40 members nominated by the religious subsector; and 96 ex-officio members (Hong Kong deputies to the National People's Congress and Legislative Council members). The 38 subsectors are listed as follows:

1. Heung Yee Kuk (21)
2. Agriculture and Fisheries (40)
3. Insurance (12)
4. Transport (12)
5. Education (20)
6. Legal (20)
7. Accountancy (20)
8. Medical (20)
9. Health Services (20)
10. Engineering (20)
11. Architectural, Surveying and Planning (20)
12. Labour (40)
13. Social Welfare (40)
14. Real Estate and Construction (12)
15. Tourism (12)
16. Commercial (First) (12)
17. Commercial (Second) (12)
18. Industrial (First) (12)
19. Industrial (Second) (12)
20. Finance (12)
21. Financial Services (12)
22. Sports, Performing Arts, Culture and Publication (40)
23. Import and Export (12)
24. Textiles and Garment (12)
25. Wholesale and Retail (12)
26. Information Technology (20)
27. Higher Education (20)
28. Hotel (11)
29. Catering (11)
30. Chinese Medicine (20)
31. Chinese People's Political Consultative Conference (41)
32. Employers' Federation of HK (11)
33. HK and Kowloon District Councils (21)
34. New Territories District Councils (21)
35. HK Chinese Enterprises Association (11)
36. National People's Congress (36)
37. Legislative Council (60)
38. Religious (40)

== Results ==
This election is considered as a "decisive victory" by the pro-democracy camp. Out of the 137 candidates, 114 candidates won, together with the 20 ex-officio members of the Legislative Council, there was enough number of nominees required for Alan Leong to be nominated in 2007 election.

=== Results by subsector ===
Statistics are generated from the official election website:

Sector	Subsector	Registered voters	Candidates	Elected	Votes	Turnout
I	Catering	8,191	11	11	uncontested	
I	Commercial (First)	990	12	12	uncontested	
I	Commercial (Second)	1,792	12	12	uncontested	
I	Employers' Federation of Hong Kong	112	11	11	uncontested	
I	Finance	136	12	12	uncontested	
I	Financial Services	580	29	12	377	65.00
I	Hong Kong Chinese Enterprises Association	319	11	11	uncontested	
I	Hotel	95	15	11	77	81.05
I	Import and Export	1,392	12	12	uncontested	
I	Industrial (First)	743	12	12	uncontested	
I	Industrial (Second)	517	12	12	uncontested	
I	Insurance	140	13	12	92	65.71
I	Real Estate and Construction	719	17	12	467	64.95
I	Textiles and Garment	3,779	13	12	912	24.13
I	Tourism	887	29	12	569	64.15
I	Transport	179	19	12	141	78.77
I	Wholesale and Retail	4,244	15	12	1,369	32.26
I	Sub-total for First Sector	24,815	255	200	4,004	37.69
II	Accountancy	20,765	38	20	5,904	28.43
II	Architectural, Surveying and Planning	5,584	42	20	1,993	35.69
II	Chinese Medicine	4,250	39	20	1,851	43.55
II	Education	78,840	31	20	17,223	21.85
II	Engineering	7,742	42	20	3,147	40.65
II	Health Services	35,873	37	20	5,798	16.16
II	Higher Education	6,865	49	20	2,505	36.49
II	Information Technology	5,004	39	20	2,306	46.08
II	Legal	5,560	42	20	2,253	40.52
II	Medical	10,087	63	20	3,218	31.90
II	Sub-total for Second Sector	180,570	422	200	46,198	25.58
III	Agriculture and Fisheries	160	40	40	uncontested	
III	Labour	554	52	40	374	67.51
III	Religious	N/A	40	40	no election	
III	Social Welfare	11,656	99	40	4,724	40.53
III	Sports, Performing Arts, Culture and Publication (Culture Sub-subsector)	792	13	10	432	54.55
III	Sports, Performing Arts, Culture and Publication (Other Sub-subsectors)	1,044	30	30	uncontested	
III	Sub-total for Third Sector	14,206	274	200	5,530	42.53
IV	National People's Congress	N/A	36	36	ex officio	
IV	Legislative Council	N/A	60	60	ex officio	
IV	Chinese People's Political Consultative Conference	118	41	41	uncontested	
IV	Heung Yee Kuk	147	21	21	uncontested	
IV	Hong Kong and Kowloon District Councils	221	33	21	199	90.05
IV	New Territories District Councils	230	40	21	211	91.74
IV	Sub-total for Fourth Sector	716	231	200	410	90.91
	TOTAL	220,307	1,182	800	56,142	27.43

=== Results by political party ===
The election results are generated from the official election website. The political affiliations are according to the candidate's self-proclaimed affiliations shown on the election platforms, as well as from the Apple Daily and other news. Candidates who are members of political party but did not state in their platforms may not be shown in this table.

Summary of the 10 December 2006 Election Committee Subsector election results
Affiliation	1st Sector		2nd Sector		3rd Sector		4th Sector		Total	
Affiliation	Standing	Elected	Standing	Elected	Standing	Elected	Standing	Elected	Standing	Elected
Democratic Alliance for the Betterment and Progress of Hong Kong	18	17	2	0	7	7	16	16	43	40
Liberal Party	14	13	8	5	–		4	3	26	21
Hong Kong Federation of Trade Unions	–		–		12	12	–		12	12
Federation of Hong Kong and Kowloon Labour Unions	–		–		4	4	–		4	4
Education Convergence	–		5	3	–		–		5	3
Civil Force	–		–		–		2	2	2	2
New Century Forum	1	1	–		–		–		1	1
Estimated pro-Beijing individuals and others	217	169	299	104	164	106	86	83	766	462
Total for pro-Beijing camp	250	200	314	112	187	129	108	104	859	545
Civic Party	3	0	15	15	5	4	2	0	25	19
Democratic Party	–		9	9	7	6	25	0	41	15
Hong Kong Social Workers' General Union (Note: Note 1: The group had total a 25-candidate list and 14 of them states their affiliation with SWGU and 4 of them are counted as their party's candidates in this table as they state in their election platforms.)	–		–		21	10	–		21	10
Demo-Social 12 (Note: Note 2: The group had total of 21 candidates in total but 10 of them are counted as their party's candidates in this table as they state in their election platforms.)	–		–		11	9	–		11	9
Hong Kong Professional Teachers' Union (Note: Note 3: The group had total of 12 candidates in total but 4 of them are counted as Democratic Party's candidate in this table as they state in their election platforms.)	–		8	8	–		–		8	8
Academics In Support of Democracy (Note: Note 4: The group had total of 15 candidates in total but 9 of them are counted as their party's candidates in this table as they state in their election platforms.)	–		6	6	–		–		6	6
Engineers for Universal Suffrage (Note: Note 5: The group had total of 8 candidates in total but two of them are counted as Civic Party's candidate in this table as they state in their election platforms.)	–		6	6	–		–		6	6
IT Voice	–		6	6	–		–		6	6
Democratic Accountants (Note: Note 6: The group had total of 7 candidates in total but two of them are counted as Civic Party's candidate in this table as they state in their election platforms.)	–		5	5	–		–		5	5
Hong Kong Caritas Employees Union	–		–		2	1	–		2	1
Hong Kong Association for Democracy and People's Livelihood	–		–		1	1	–		1	1
Hong Kong Democratic Development Network	–		1	1	–		–		1	1
Hong Kong Democratic Foundation	–		1	1	–		–		1	1
Pro-democratic individuals and others	2	0	28	26	–		–		30	26
Total for pro-democracy camp	5	0	85	83	47	31	27	0	164	114
Hong Kong Public Doctors' Association	–		13	5	–		–		13	5
Hong Kong Chinese Medicine Practitioners' Rights General Union	–		10	0	–		–		10	0
Total (turnout 27.43%)	255	200	422	200	234	160	135	104	1,046	664

== See also ==
- 2007 Hong Kong Chief Executive election
- Politics of Hong Kong
