= Michael C. Davis =

American legal scholar

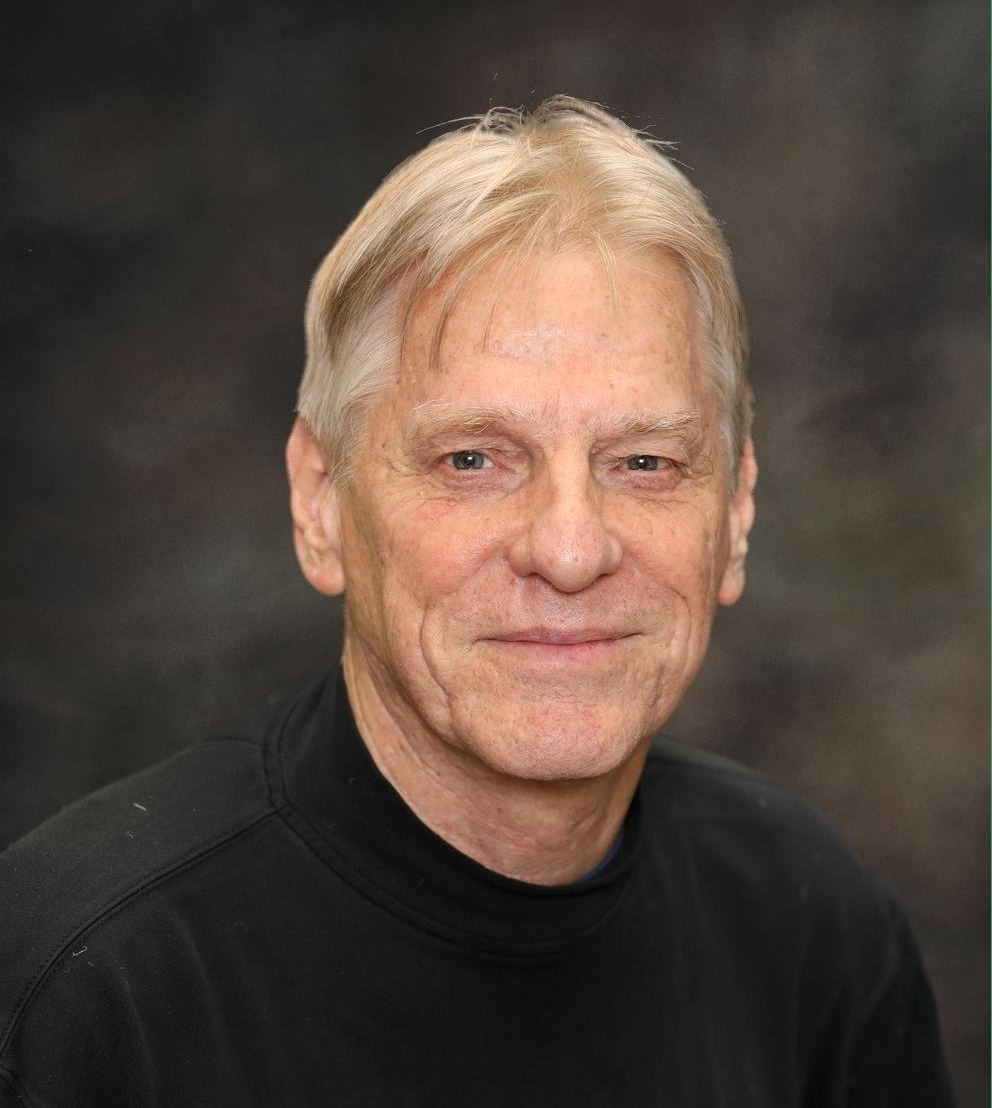
- Born: United States
- Other name: 戴大為
- Education: Ohio State University (BA); University of California (JD); Yale University (LLM)
- Occupation: Academic
- Employer: Woodrow Wilson International Center for Scholars
- Known for: Human rights advocacy and expertise in Asian development

Michael C. Davis (Chinese name Chinese: 戴大為; pinyin: Dài Dàwéi) is an American legal scholar until recently serving as a Global Fellow at the Woodrow Wilson International Center for Scholars. He is also an affiliate research scholar at the U.S.-Asia Law Institute at New York University, a research associate at Columbia University, and a professor of law and international affairs at O.P. Jindal Global University.

== Education ==
Davis holds degrees from Ohio State University (BA), the University of California (JD), and Yale University (LLM).

== Career ==
Until stepping down in 2016, he was professor in the Law Faculty at the University of Hong Kong where, before the National Security Law was imposed in 2020, he would return annually as a visiting professor.

Before moving to Hong Kong, as a Hawaii attorney, he worked for the Native Hawaiian Legal Corporation on indigenous rights and land use issues. As a public intellectual and human rights advocate in Hong Kong, he was a founder of both the Article 23 Concern Group and the Article 45 Concern Group which led massive protests for human rights in 2003 and 2004. His human rights work has also included a nearly two decade engagement on the Tibet issue and on human rights and development issues across Asia.

Davis has held numerous academic positions in several leading academic institutions, including the J. Landis Martin Visiting Professorship in Human Rights at Northwestern University, the Robert and Marion Short Visiting Professorship at Notre Dame University and the Frederick K. Cox Visiting Professorship at Case Western Reserve University, as well as the Schell Senior Fellowship in Human Rights at Yale Law School.

He is a Senior Research Associate at the Weatherhead East Asia Institute at Columbia University, and an affiliate research scholar at both Notre Dame's Liu Institute for Asia and Asian Studies and NYU's U.S.-Asia Law Institute. He was a Global Fellow at the Woodrow Wilson International Center in Washington, DC (2019-2025, until the Wilson Center was recently defunded), and a Reagan-Fascell Democracy Fellow, at the National Endowment for Democracy (2016–2017), where his research related to "resistance movements and constitutionalism in emerging democracies in Asia." Davis held the Wilson Center Residential Fellowship for 2018–2019 at the Woodrow Wilson International Center in Washington, DC where his project title was "Reversing the Liberal Retreat and Establishing Constitutionalism in Emerging Democracies in Asia."

== Publications ==
=== Books ===
- Freedom Undone: The Assault on Liberal Values in Hong Kong, (New York: Columbia University Press, AAS Series, 2024) Author
- Making Hong Kong China: The Rollback of Human Rights and the Rule of Law, (New York: Columbia University Press, AAS Series, 2020) (author)
- International Intervention in the Post-Cold War World: Moral Responsibility and Power Politics, (New York: M.E. Sharpe, 2004) (lead editor)
- Human Rights and Chinese Values: Legal, Philosophical and Political Perspectives (Oxford University Press, 1995) (editor)
- The Aftermath of the 1989 Crisis in Mainland China (Boulder: Westview Press, 1992) (co-editor)
- Constitutional Confrontation in Hong Kong (London: Macmillan Press, 1990; New York: St. Martins Press, 1990) (author)

=== Articles ===
- "Hong Kong: How Beijing Perfected Repression," Journal of Democracy, Vol. 33/1, January, 2022
- “Beijing’s Crackdown on Human Rights and the Rule of Law in Hong Kong,” Asia Policy, Vol. 16/2, April 2021
- "Strengthening Constitutionalism in Asia," Journal of Democracy, Vol. 28 (October 2017) pp. 147–161. www.journalofdemocracy.org/article/strengthening-constitutionalism-asia
- "The Basic Law, Universal Suffrage and the Rule of Law in Hong Kong," Hastings International and Comparative Law Review, Vol. 38/2, Spring, 2016, pp. 275–298.
- "Can International Law Help Resolve the Conflicts Over Uninhabited Islands in the East China Sea?", Denver Journal of International Law, Vol. 43/2 (2015) pp. 119–163.
- "Tibet and China's National Minority Policies," Orbis, Vol. 56/3, (2012), pp. 429–446 http://dx.doi.org/10.1016/j.orbis.2012.05.009/

== Human rights advocacy ==
In response to the Hong Kong Government's proposed draft legislation on national security under the Hong Kong Basic Law Article 23, which proposal raised worries on infringement of freedom of assembly and expression, Davis and eight other prominent Hong Kong lawyers founded the Article 23 Concern Group (later renamed to Article 45 Concern Group) in 2003. The Article 23 Concern Group led the massive protest against the proposed legislation. The Hong Kong government later withdrew the legislative proposal after more than 500,000 people protested against the proposal, one of the largest protests after the 1997 handover of Hong Kong to China.

Davis has advocated for political reform and universal suffrage in Hong Kong and around Asia for more than two decades. His prolific commentary have been seen in newspapers such as The New York Times, the South China Morning Post, the Washington Post, the Nikkei Business Magazine, Foreign Affairs, and the Apple Daily, as well as quasi-academic media such as Yale Global. He has appeared for interviews on crucial human rights topics in such broadcast media as CNN, the BBC, National Public Radio and NBC News. He expressed his sympathy for the 2014 Hong Kong Umbrella Movement and argued non-violent civil disobedience did not undermine rule of law in Hong Kong, that the government's loose interpretation of the Basic Law posed a greater threat. As a result of his numerous commentaries that year, Amnesty International, the Hong Kong Journalist Association, and the Foreign Correspondents' Club (Hong Kong) awarded him the 2014 Human Rights Press Award for commentary. He has remained a consistent public voice against the ongoing crackdown in Hong Kong following the imposition of the national security law.
