= Chi Fu (constituency) =

Constituency in the Southern District, Hong Kong

- Elected constituency for the Southern District Council
- Boundary of Chi Fu in Southern District
- District: Southern
- Legislative Council constituency: Hong Kong Island West
- Population: 16,105 (2019)
- Electorate: 9,683 (2019)

Current constituency
- Created: 1994
- Number of members: One
- Member: Vacant

Chi Fu (Chinese: 置富) is one of the 17 constituencies in the Southern District, Hong Kong.

The constituency returns one district councillor to the Southern District Council, with an election every four years. The seat was last held by nonpartisan Andrew Law Tak-wo.

Chi Fu constituency is loosely based on the southwestern part of the Chi Fu Fa Yuen, Pokfulam Gardens and Pok Fu Lam Village in Pokfulam with an estimated population of 16,062.

== Councillors represented ==
Election	Member	Party
1994	Lai Hok-lim	Democratic
1999	Chu Ching-hong	Nonpartisan
2019	Andrew Lam Tak-wo→Vacant (Note: Resigned on 9 July 2021.)	Independent democrat

== Election results ==
=== 2010s ===
Southern District Council Election, 2019: Chi Fu
Party	Candidate	Votes	%	±%
Ind. democrat	Andrew Lam Tak-wo	4,292	61.00	
Independent	Lucy Lo Siu	2,744	39.00	
Majority		1,548	22.00	
Turnout		7,062	72.94	
Ind. democrat gain from Independent		Swing		

Southern District Council Election, 2015: Chi Fu
Party	Candidate	Votes	%	±%
Nonpartisan	Chu Ching-hong	2,762	55.3	
Independent	Yiu Chung-yim	2,233	44.7	
Majority		529	10.6	
Turnout		5,021	54.9	
Nonpartisan hold		Swing		

Southern District Council Election, 2011: Chi Fu
Party	Candidate	Votes	%	±%
Nonpartisan	Chu Ching-hong	Uncontested		
Nonpartisan hold		Swing		

=== 2000s ===
Southern District Council Election, 2007: Chi Fu
Party	Candidate	Votes	%	±%
Nonpartisan	Chu Ching-hong	Uncontested		
Nonpartisan hold		Swing		

Southern District Council Election, 2003: Chi Fu
Party	Candidate	Votes	%	±%
Nonpartisan	Chu Ching-hong	2,598	64.7	
Civic	Annie Ki Mui-kuen	1,415	35.3	
Majority		1,183	29.4	
Nonpartisan hold		Swing		

=== 1990s ===
Southern District Council Election, 1999: Chi Fu
Party	Candidate	Votes	%	±%
Nonpartisan	Chu Ching-hong	Uncontested		
Nonpartisan hold		Swing		

Southern District Board Election, 1994: Chi Fu
Party	Candidate	Votes	%	±%
Democratic	Lai Hok-lim	1,815	73.0	
Liberal	Chu Ching-hong	657	26.4	
Majority		1,158	46.6	
Democratic win (new seat)				
