= Article 45 Concern Group =

Basic Law Article 45 Concern Group
- Traditional Chinese: 《基本法》四十五條關注組
Transcriptions
Standard Mandarin
- Hanyu Pinyin: Jīběnfá Sīshíwǔtiáo Guānzhùzǔ
Yue: Cantonese
- Yale Romanization: gēi bún fat sei sahp ńgh tiùh gwāan jyu jóu
- Jyutping: gei1 bun2 faat3 sei3 sap6 ng5 tiu4 gwan1 zyu3 zou2
- IPA: [kéi pǔːn fāːt sēi sɐ̀p ̬ŋ tʰȉːu kʷɐ́n tɕȳː tsǒu]

Basic Law Article 45 Concern Group was a pro-democracy political group in the Hong Kong Special Administrative Region of the People's Republic of China (HKSAR) . It was established on 14 November 2003 by legal practitioners and academics. It had four seats in the Legislative Council of Hong Kong before it transformed into the Civic Party in 2006.

== Beliefs ==
The group originated from the "Basic Law Article 23 Concern Group", which was formed to criticise the HKSAR Government's legislative proposals to implement the anti-subversion Article 23 of the Basic Law during the proposed legislations' consultation period in 2002-2003. Outspoken members of the group included the barristers Audrey Eu, Alan Leong and Ronny Tong, who were all former chairpersons of the Hong Kong Bar Association. Their professional and outspoken image established during the Article 23 controversy has led to them being especially popular with the middle class.

After the HKSAR Government shelved the Article 23 proposals, the group renamed itself the Article 45 Concern Group, with the addition of a few members. Its focus changed to push for universal suffrage in 2007/08. The ultimate aim of universal suffrage for the Chief Executive and the Legislative Council is stipulated under Article 45 and Article 68 of the Basic Law of Hong Kong respectively.

The group considered universal suffrage by 2007/8 as vital to the protection of human rights and the rule of law in Hong Kong, and aimed to promote debates on universal suffrage from a legal and constitutional point of view.

== Elections ==
In close collaboration with the democratic camp, several members of the group ran for the 2004 Legislative Council elections and succeeded in gaining four seats in the Council (up from two before the elections). The group remained vocal in criticizing the Chinese and HKSAR Governments for their stance regarding a number of political issues, including the decision of the Standing Committee of the National People's Congress of the People's Republic of China not to allow universal suffrage in 2007/08. In line with the pan-democratic camp, it supported gathering "the public's" view on the issue of universal suffrage by means of a referendum in 2004.

The group vetoed a critical bill concerning the democratisation of the Hong Kong system in December 2005, saying that the democratic reforms were not far-reaching enough, e.g. did not have a set timetable for universal suffrage, and definitely not by 2007/8 as this group was demanding. Ultimately, this led to the Chief Executive for the HKSAR, Donald Tsang, in suggesting that no further reform packages will be introduced for the rest of his current term in office, at least.

== The Civic Party ==
The Group disbanded in March 2006 to form what is now the Civic Party. Apart from the Article 45 Concern Group members, Fernando Cheung and Mandy Tam joined as well. The Temporary Executive Committee of the Civic Party was established on 19 February 2006.

== Founding members ==
- Audrey Eu, legislator, barrister and former Chairwoman of Hong Kong Bar Association (1997–1999)
- Ronny Tong, legislator, barrister and former Chairman of Hong Kong Bar Association (1999–2001)
- Alan Leong, legislator, barrister and former Chairman of Hong Kong Bar Association (2001–2003)
- Margaret Ng, legislator representing the legal sector and barrister
- Christine Loh, former legislator, has a law degree, runs the private think tank Civic Exchange
- Gladys Li, barrister, chairlady of International Commission of Jurists (Hong Kong section)
- Johannes Chan, barrister, dean of the Faculty of Law, the University of Hong Kong, Hon SC
- Michael C. Davis, attorney of the United States and former professor of law at the Chinese University of Hong Kong (now Visiting Professor at the University of Hong Kong)
- Eric Cheung Tat-ming, solicitor; assistant professor at the Faculty of Law, the University of Hong Kong
- Denis Chang, barrister
- Mark Daly, solicitor
