= Hang Hau East (constituency) =

Constituency of the Sai Kung District Council of Hong Kong

- Elected constituency for the Sai Kung District Council
- Boundary of Hang Hau East in Sai Kung District
- District: Sai Kung
- Legislative Council constituency: New Territories South East
- Population: 13,902 (2019)
- Electorate: 5,418 (2019)

Current constituency
- Created: 1999
- Number of members: One
- Member: vacant

Hang Hau East (Chinese: 坑口東) is one of the 29 constituencies in the Sai Kung District.

The constituency returns one district councillor to the Sai Kung District Council, with an election every four years.

Hang Hau East constituency is loosely based on the eastern part of Hang Hau, with an estimated population of 13,902.

== Councillors represented ==
Election	Member	Party
1999	Wan Yee-chung	Progressive Alliance
2003	Peter Lau Wai-cheung	Nonpartisan
2019	Ryan Lee Yin-ho→Vacant	CGPLTKO

== Election results ==
=== 2010s ===
Tai Po District Council Election, 2019: Hang Hau East
Party	Candidate	Votes	%	±%
Ind. democrat	Ryan Lee Yin-ho	1,850	49.57	
Nonpartisan	Peter Lau Wai-cheung	1,559	41.77	
Independent	Newman Lau Man-choi	323	8.65	
Majority		291	7.80	
Turnout		3,740	69.03	
Ind. democrat gain from Nonpartisan		Swing		
