= Kenneth Chan Ka-lok =

Dr. Kenneth Chan Ka-lok
- 陳家洛
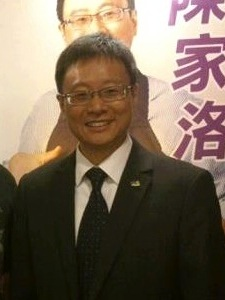

Member of the Legislative Council
- In office 1 October 2012 – 30 September 2016
- Preceded by: Tanya Chan
- Succeeded by: Tanya Chan
- Constituency: Hong Kong Island

Chairman of the Civic Party
- In office 8 January 2011 – June 2012
- Preceded by: Kuan Hsin-chi
- Succeeded by: Audrey Eu

Personal details
- Born: 12 June 1968 (age 58)
- Citizenship: Hong Kong
- Party: Civic Party
- Spouse: Gabi (m. 1995)
- Education: CUHK (B. Soc. Sc.); Oxford (M. Phil., D. Phil.)
- Occupation: Associate professor

Kenneth Chan Ka-lok
- Traditional Chinese: 陳家洛
- Simplified Chinese: 陈家洛
Transcriptions
Standard Mandarin
- Hanyu Pinyin: Chén Jiāluò
Yue: Cantonese
- Yale Romanization: Chàhn Gā lok
- Jyutping: Can^{4} Gaa^{1} lok^{3}

Kenneth Chan Ka-lok (Chinese: 陳家洛) (born 12 June 1968) was an elected member of the Hong Kong Legislative Council from 2012 until 2016. representing the Hong Kong Island geographical constituency. He was the chairman of the Hong Kong Civic Party. He is an associate professor in political science at Hong Kong Baptist University. His research interests include the political economy of the European Union and comparative politics of post-communist Central Europe.

Chan married his wife Gabi in 1995. Gabi is Polish. They have four daughters and one son.

Chan also is a Roman Catholic.

== Academic record ==
- Bachelor of Social Science (Government and Public Administration) with Honours at the Chinese University of Hong Kong, 1990
- Master of Philosophy in Politics at St Peter's College, Oxford, 1992
- Doctor of Philosophy in Politics at Nuffield College, Oxford, 1998

Legislative Council of Hong Kong
Preceded by Tanya Chan	Member of Legislative Council; Representative for Hong Kong Island; 2012–2016	Succeeded by Tanya Chan
Party political offices
Preceded by Kuan Hsin-chi	Chairman of Civic Party; 2011–2012	Succeeded by Audrey Eu
