= Audrey Eu =

Hong Kong lawyer and politician (born 1953)

Audrey Eu Yuet-mee JP SC
- 余若薇
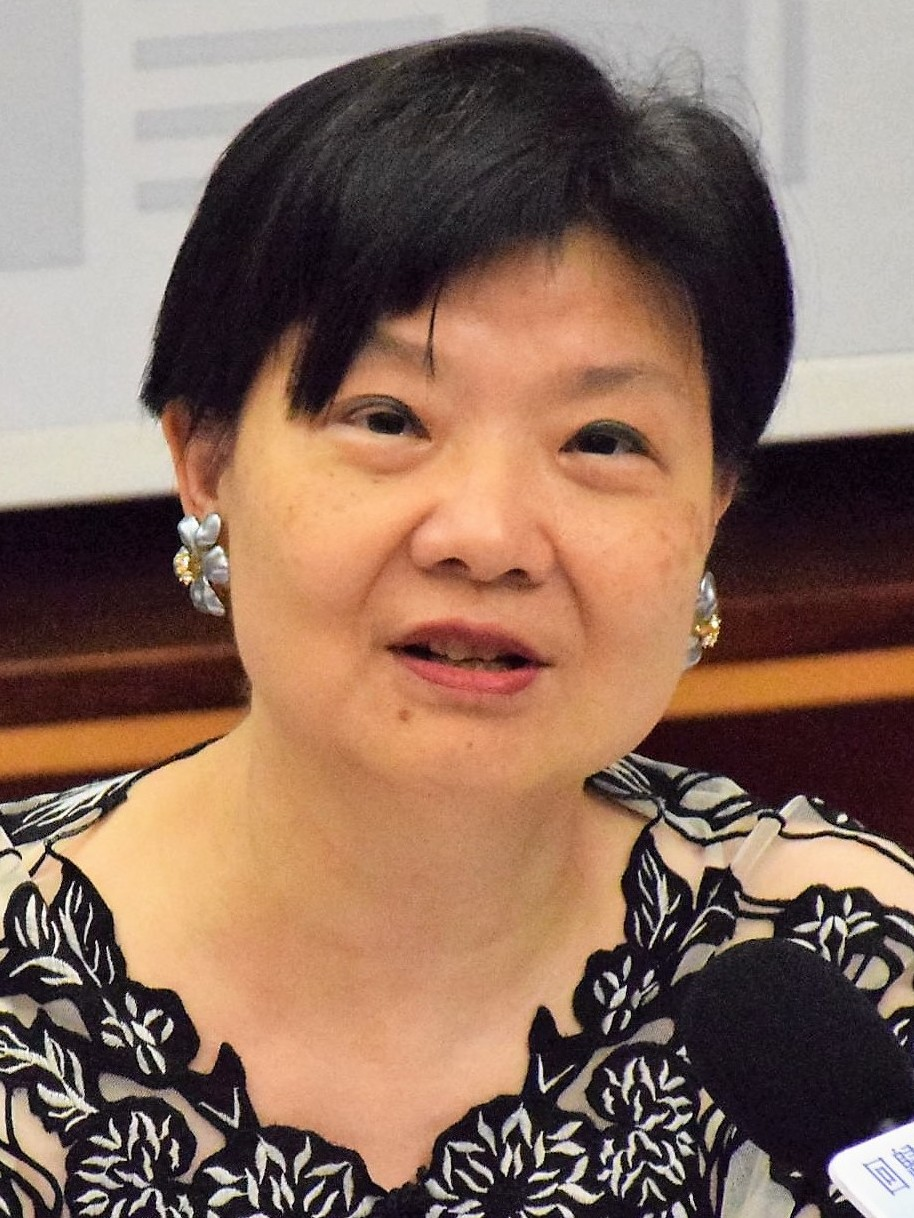

Chairperson of the Civic Party
- In office 1 December 2012 – 19 November 2016
- Deputy: Prof. Stephen Chan; Tanya Chan
- Leader: Alan Leong; Alvin Yeung
- Preceded by: Kenneth Chan; Margaret Ng (Acting)
- Succeeded by: Alan Leong

Member of the Legislative Council
- In office 11 December 2000 – 30 September 2012
- Preceded by: Gary Cheng
- Succeeded by: Christopher Chung
- Constituency: Hong Kong Island

Leader of Civic Party
- In office 19 March 2006 – 8 January 2011
- Preceded by: New title
- Succeeded by: Alan Leong

Personal details
- Born: 11 September 1953 (age 72) Hong Kong
- Party: Civic Party
- Spouse: Edmund Woo Kin-wai
- Education: St. Francis' Canossian College; St. Paul's Co-educational College; University of Hong Kong; London School of Economics
- Occupation: Barrister

Audrey Eu
- Chinese: 余若薇
Transcriptions
Standard Mandarin
- Hanyu Pinyin: Yú Ruòwēi
Yue: Cantonese
- Yale Romanization: Yùh Yeuhk mèih
- Jyutping: Jyu^{4} Joek^{6}mei^{4}

Audrey Eu Yuet-mee is a Hong Kong lawyer and politician who represented Hong Kong Island in the Legislative Council of Hong Kong from 2000 to 2012. Eu was the founding leader of the Civic Party and was a member of the party's executive committee, focusing on party development. In politics, Eu has focused on matters relating to the Basic Law.

== Early life and legal career ==
Audrey Eu was born on 11 September 1953 in Hong Kong. She studied at St. Francis' Canossian College from 1960 to 1970, and matriculated from St. Paul's Co-educational College in 1972.

She earned her Bachelor of Laws from the University of Hong Kong and her Master of Laws from the London School of Economics. She was called to the Bar in England in 1977 and the Bar in Hong Kong in 1978 and was appointed as a Queen's Counsel in 1993 (known as Senior Counsel since 1997). She continues to practice and specialises in civil law. Notable pupils included Andrew Cheung, Chief Justice of the Court of Final Appeal. Before entering politics, Eu was the chair of the Hong Kong Bar Association. She shot to prominence on the right of abode issue, at the time of the transfer of sovereignty to the People's Republic of China in 1997, she held a firm stance against the interpretation of the Hong Kong Basic Law by the National People's Congress. In 2011, she was awarded an honorary fellowship by the London School of Economics and Political Science.

== Political career ==
Eu decided to enter into politics in 2000. She contested the Hong Kong by-election that year and successfully gained a seat at the Legislative Council of Hong Kong, replacing Gary Cheng, who resigned from his seat amid controversy. She then became a founding member of the Basic Law Article 23 Concern Group, which later became the Basic Law Article 45 Concern Group, then the Civic Party in 2005.

=== Article 23 Concern Group ===
In 2002, when the Hong Kong Government wanted to alter the existing Article 23 concerning treason and sedition, Eu, with some other notable members of the Bar, including Alan Leong, Margaret Ng, Ronny Tong, formed the Basic Law Article 23 Concern Group. Before the draft Bill became public, Eu put forward strong opinions and statements opposing certain measures of the Article 23 legislation. Her campaigning helped her significantly raise her public profile after 1 July 2003, demonstrations.

=== Article 45 Concern group ===
Concern started to grow among Hong Kong residents later about Articles 45 and 68 of the Basic Law in 2004. There were also uncertainties concerning the future of the next 2007 Chief Executive election and the next 4th LegCo elections in 2008. In response, Eu, along with other barristers including Margaret Ng and Ronny Tong, formed the Basic Law Article 45 Concern Group that advocated fully democratic processes in the form of universal suffrage in both elections. She found most support with the middle-class.

Eu ran for the 2004 LegCo election for the Hong Kong Island constituency in the same ballot as Cyd Ho from The Frontier. The "Eu-Ho" pair obtained 73,844 votes which resulted in Eu obtaining a seat at the expense of Ho, who lost out to her nearest DAB rival Choy So Yuk by a mere 815 votes. This was seen as a blunder by the pan-democratic camp, as Hong Kong Democratic Party LegCo candidate Martin Lee had more than enough votes to be elected, directly impacting Cyd Ho's election chances.

=== Civic Party ===
Eu was the founding leader of the party, and held the office from 19 March 2006 to 8 January 2011.

She stood for and was returned in the Hong Kong Island geographical constituency for the 2008 Hong Kong legislative election. She was placed second on the Civic Party ticket, behind newcomer Tanya Chan, who was also elected. After deducting the quotient required for the first seat, the remainder to Eu was only 30,362, enable Eu to win a seat in the constituency with the lowest number of vote. She got 525 votes less than her former running mate in the 2004 election Cyd Ho. However, Eu lost her seat in the Legislative Council in September 2012 after gave up her safe seat in Hong Kong Island geographical constituency to Kenneth Chan Ka-lok.

=== 2009 Reform package ===
In the debate over the Hong Kong government's 2009 reform package (referred to by government as the '2012 constitutional reform package') she was among the firmer voices in the pan-democratic camp, supporting the January 2010 resignation by five pan-democrat Legislative Councillors to force a by-election in which they re-stood (and were re-elected), intended as referendum on democracy. In the run-up to 23 June 2010 Legco vote on the reform package she refused support, saying that it did not go far enough towards democratic expectations, even if it included the Democratic Party's compromise proposal to have the five new district council functional constituency seats returned by popular election.

== Other positions ==
Eu is a patron of St John's Cathedral HIV Education Centre and was formerly a member of the Consumer Council's Management Committee of its Consumer Legal Action Fund.

Eu is a practising barrister. She was on the defence team of Jimmy Lai, in opposition to her brother, Benjamin Yu Yuk-hoi, who led the prosecution of Lai beginning in 2021.

Legal offices
Preceded by Gladys Li	Chairman of Hong Kong Bar Association; 1997–1999	Succeeded by Ronny Tong
Legislative Council of Hong Kong
Preceded by Gary Cheng	Member of Legislative Council; Representative for Hong Kong Island; 2000–2012	Succeeded by Christopher Chung
Party political offices
New political party	Leader of Civic Party; 2006–2011	Succeeded by Alan Leong
Preceded by Kenneth Chan	Chairman of Civic Party; 2012–2016	Succeeded by Alan Leong
