= Tanya Chan =

Hong Kong politician (born 1971)

- 陳淑莊
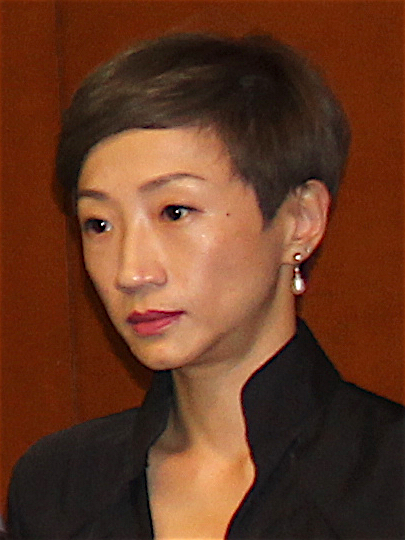

Member of Legislative Council
- In office 1 October 2016 – 30 September 2020
- Preceded by: Kenneth Chan
- Constituency: Hong Kong Island
- In office 17 May 2010 – 30 September 2012
- Preceded by: Herself
- Succeeded by: Kenneth Chan
- Constituency: Hong Kong Island
- In office 1 October 2008 – 28 January 2010
- Preceded by: Martin Lee
- Succeeded by: Herself
- Constituency: Hong Kong Island

Personal details
- Born: 14 September 1971 (age 54) Hong Kong
- Party: Civic Party
- Education: Sacred Heart Canossian College; University of Hong Kong (LLB, PCLL)
- Occupation: Barrister
- Website: http://www.tanyachan.hk

Chinese name
- Traditional Chinese: 陳淑莊
- Simplified Chinese: 陈淑庄
Transcriptions
Standard Mandarin
- Hanyu Pinyin: Chén Shūzhuāng
Yue: Cantonese
- Yale Romanization: Chàhn Suhk jōng
- Jyutping: Can^{4} Suk^{6}zong^{1}

Tanya Chan (Chinese: 陳淑莊; born 14 September 1971) is a Hong Kong politician who served as a Legislative Councillor representing Hong Kong Island from 2008 to 2012, and again from 2016 to 2020. She is a founding member of the Civic Party. Chan is sometimes known as the "Zhou Xun of the Civic Party". On 29 September 2020, Chan announced that she would quit politics.

== Early life and education ==
Chan's ancestral origin is Shanghai and she was educated at Sacred Heart Canossian College. Chan received Bachelor of Laws degree from the University of Hong Kong, where she also studied the Postgraduate Certificate in Laws.

== Political career ==
In the 2008 LegCo elections, Chan was elected into and became a member of, the Hong Kong Legislative Council to represent Hong Kong Island, along with Civic Party leader Audrey Eu.

In January 2010, Chan and other four lawmakers, Albert Chan, Alan Leong, Leung Kwok-hung and Wong Yuk-man resigned from LegCo, forcing a by-election, which they would treat as a "de facto referendum" to press the Chinese Government into allowing universal suffrage in Hong Kong. On 16 May 2010, she was re-elected as a lawmaker in the by-election.

Until 2011, she was a member of Central and Western District Council.

In the 2012 legislative election, she stood as the second candidate in Kenneth Chan's list in Hong Kong Island, in an attempt to boost Civic Party's votes and seats. Although Kenneth Chan was elected, she lost re-election under the party-list proportional representation system. In the 2016 legislative election, she was returned to the Legislative Council, succeeding outgoing Kenneth Chan's seat.

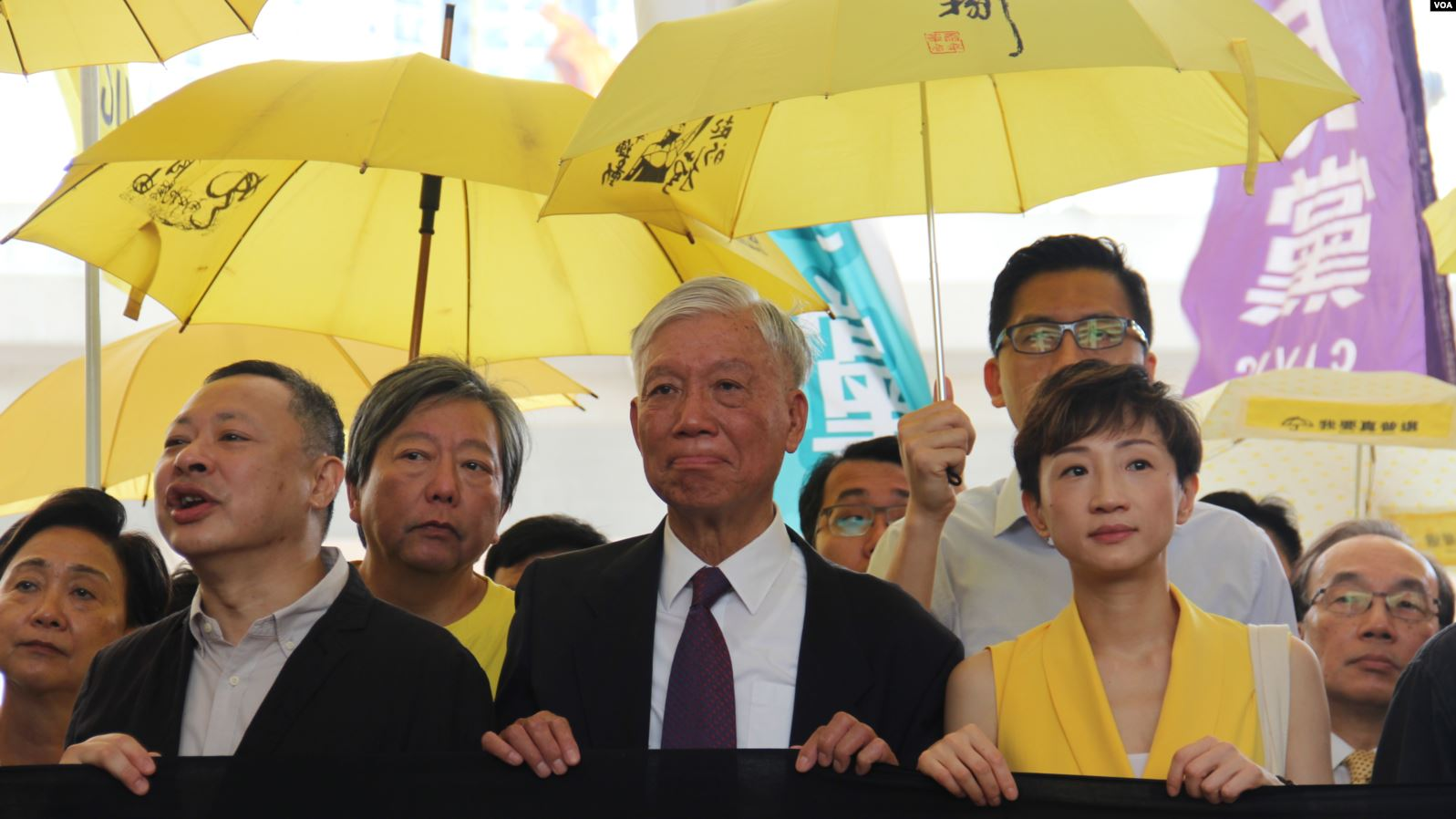
Benny Tai, Chu Yiu-ming, Tanya Chan (left to right) accompanied by their supporters getting rally before the hearing in the West Kowloon Court. Hong Kong. 24 April 2019

== Trial at West Kowloon Court ==
On 9 April 2019, at West Kowloon Court, Chan and eight others were found guilty of public nuisance and incitement over their roles in the 2014 Hong Kong protests.

Earlier, Chan scheduled a full-body health check-up to reassure her mother that she was physically ready to endure a jail term if this were to happen. Her physical examination was conducted in a private hospital on 4 April. Chan received the results of her health check on 11 April, followed by a consultation in Canossa Hospital on 17 April. The test results revealed there was something unclear with her brain. On 18 April, Dr Edmund Woo Kin-wai, a neurologist, found that Tanya Chan had a meningioma, a type of brain tumour larger than a ping-pong ball. The tumour was considered dangerous as it pressed on Chan's brain stem, nerves, and blood vessels.

On 23 April, medics stated that Chan needed open brain surgery to remove the tumour as soon as possible, followed by radiotherapy sessions. According to medics, there was no clarity whether the tumour was caused by cancer, and an open brain surgery would be necessary for additional medical insights. On 24 April, the trial at West Kowloon Court adjourned her sentencing to 10 June, since Chan required brain surgery within two weeks. The other eight Occupy Central leaders were sentenced to different punishments, ranging from 200 hours community service to 16 months of jail time.

In the same day, Chan asked Legislative Council president Andrew Leung for leave from her legislative duties while she sought further treatment. Before speaking about her illness, she also asked Hongkongers to continue their fight for democracy and to believe in their faith.

On 10 June 2019, Chan was handed a sentence of eight months suspended for two years, after the court was told that she would require radiotherapy treatment and will experience double vision for six months. Her brain tumour was found to be benign, but had not been completely removed, and needed further therapy. The court was also asked to consider her record of public service since 2006.

== Later career ==
Chan moved to Taiwan, and in 2024, opened a restaurant in Taipei's Songshan District.

== Bibliography ==
- 政．戲．伊人 [Politics. play. Yiren], Ming Chuang Publishing Co., Ltd., 2008, ISBN 9789628994663
- My Journeys for Food and Justice (邊走邊吃邊抗爭), Red Publishing (Round Table Culture), 2014, ISBN 9789888270644

Political offices
Preceded by Mark Lin	Member of Central and Western District Council; Representative for Peak; 2008–2011	Succeeded by Joseph Chan Ho-lim
Legislative Council of Hong Kong
Preceded by Martin Lee	Member of Legislative Council; Representative for Hong Kong Island; 2008–2012	Succeeded by Kenneth Chan
Preceded by Kenneth Chan	Member of Legislative Council; Representative for Hong Kong Island; 2016–2020	Vacant
Preceded by Claudia Mo	Convenor of pro-democracy camp 2019–2020	Succeeded by Wu Chi-wai
