= 2007 Hong Kong Chief Executive election =

- 25 March 2007

All 796 votes of the Election Committee 401 votes needed to win
- Opinion polls
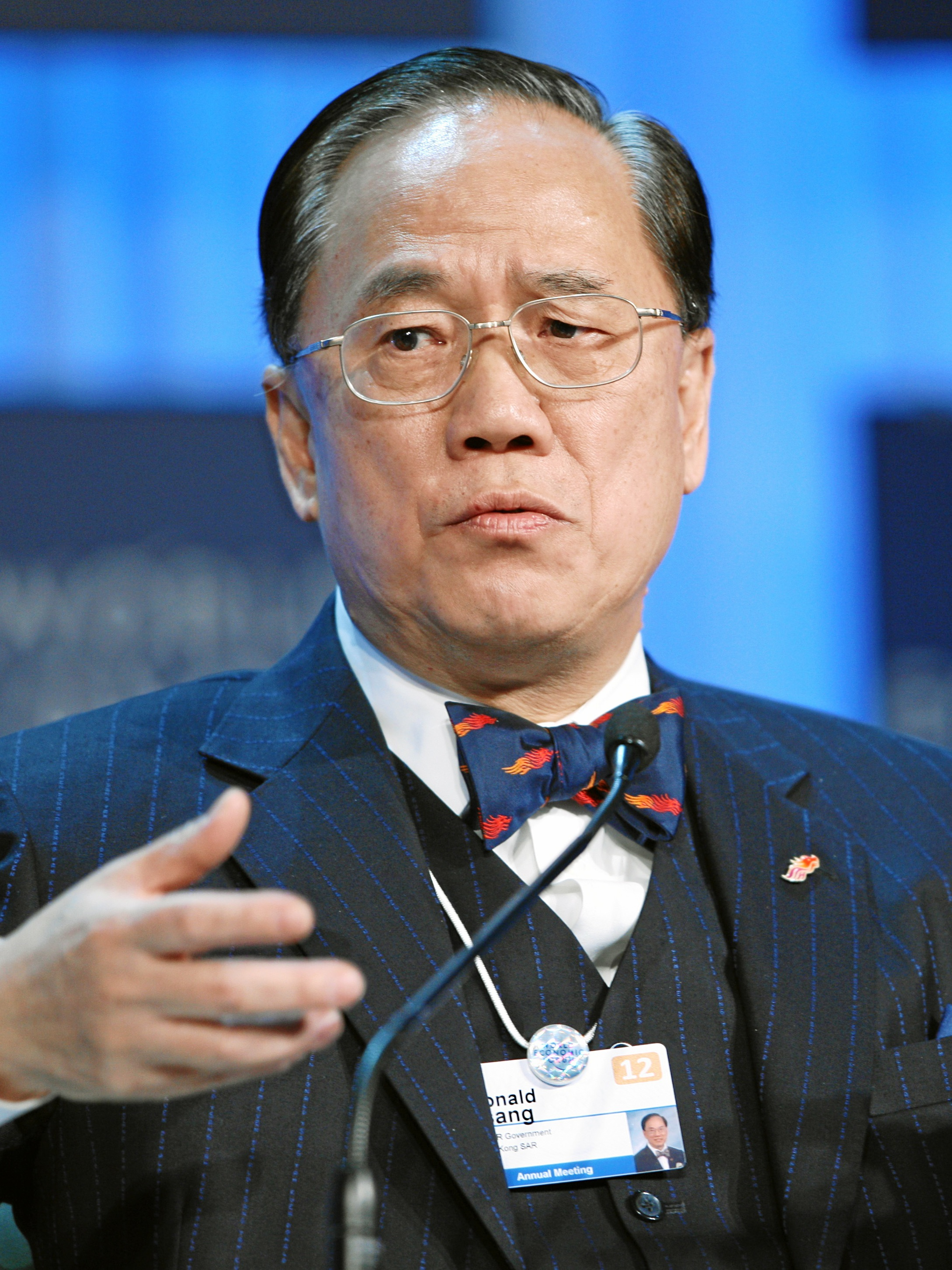

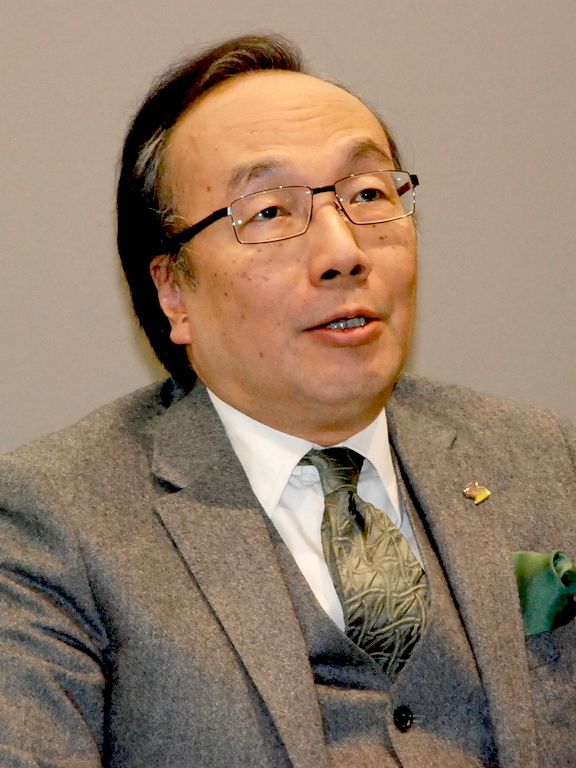
Nominee	Donald Tsang	Alan Leong
Party	Nonpartisan	Civic
Alliance	Pro-Beijing	Pan-democracy
Electoral vote	649	123
Percentage	84.07%	15.93%
Chief Executive before election
Donald Tsang
Nonpartisan
Elected Chief Executive
Donald Tsang
Nonpartisan

The 2007 Hong Kong Chief Executive election was held on 25 March 2007 to select the Chief Executive of Hong Kong. Incumbent Chief Executive Donald Tsang was re-elected, defeating the pro-democracy challenger, legislator Alan Leong of the Civic Party by 649 to 123 votes in the 796-member Election Committee dominated by the pro-Beijing electors.

It was the first competitive Chief Executive election featuring two candidates from different political camp as the pan-democracy camp were able to field their candidate to challenge the Beijing-favoured candidate for the first time. It has been said that the competitive nature of this election, with debates held between the candidates, changed Hong Kong's political culture.

== Election Committee election ==
The Election Committee subsector elections were held on 10 December 2006 to form the 800-member Election Committee to select the Chief Executive. Out of 134 candidates, the pro-democrats won 114 seats. All pro-democracy candidates in Accountancy, Education, Engineering, Health services, Higher education, Information Technology and Legal subsectors won, of which the pro-democracy Legal candidates won all the seats in the subsector. Together with the 20 ex officio pro-democrat members of the Legislative Council, the pro-democrats were able to nominate their Chief Executive candidate.

Barrister Alan Leong, member of the Civic Party and Legislative Council first expressed his interest in running as early as September 2006. A consensus was reached between the divided pro-democracy camp, despite the opposition from the radical democrats including the League of Social Democrats (LSD). Leong announced his candidacy in October 2006.

== Pre-nomination campaign ==
Alan Leong centred his campaign on democratic reforms, labour issues, anti-discrimination, solving the income disparity, education, employment, environment and public finance reforms. Incumbent Chief Executive Donald Tsang was noted for his impassiveness in the campaign. On announcing his candidacy, Tsang evaded all media invitations, and ignore Leong's constant pressure. He did not formally declare his run until early February, stressing that his priority was to fulfil his job expectations as the Chief Executive rather than a Chief Executive candidate. Tsang's slogan was "I will get the job done".

== Nominations ==
Donald Tsang had been widely expected to secure re-election by a landslide, as he had received nominations from 641 members of the same body. The pro-democracy candidate, Alan Leong secured 132 nominations, ensuring that he would contest the election, the first opposed Chief Executive election.

Although the outcome of the election was a foregone conclusion, it was hoped that the debates would stimulate discussion about the future direction of Hong Kong, were meant for the respective candidates to put forward their political visions for public scrutiny.

Candidate	Born	Party	Most recent position	Campaign	Nominations received
Donald Tsang 曾蔭權	7 October 1944 (age 62)	Nonpartisan (Pro-Beijing)	Chief Executive of Hong Kong (2005–2012)	I'll get the job done! Announced: 1 February 2007; Nominated: 16 February 2007	641 / 796 (81%)
Alan Leong 梁家傑	22 February 1958 (age 49)	Civic Party (Pan-democracy)	Member of the Legislative Council (2004–2016)	It's a Matter of ChoiCE Announced: 6 November 2006; Nominated: 14 February 2007	132 / 796 (17%)

Other minor candidates included The Bus Uncle.

== Debates ==
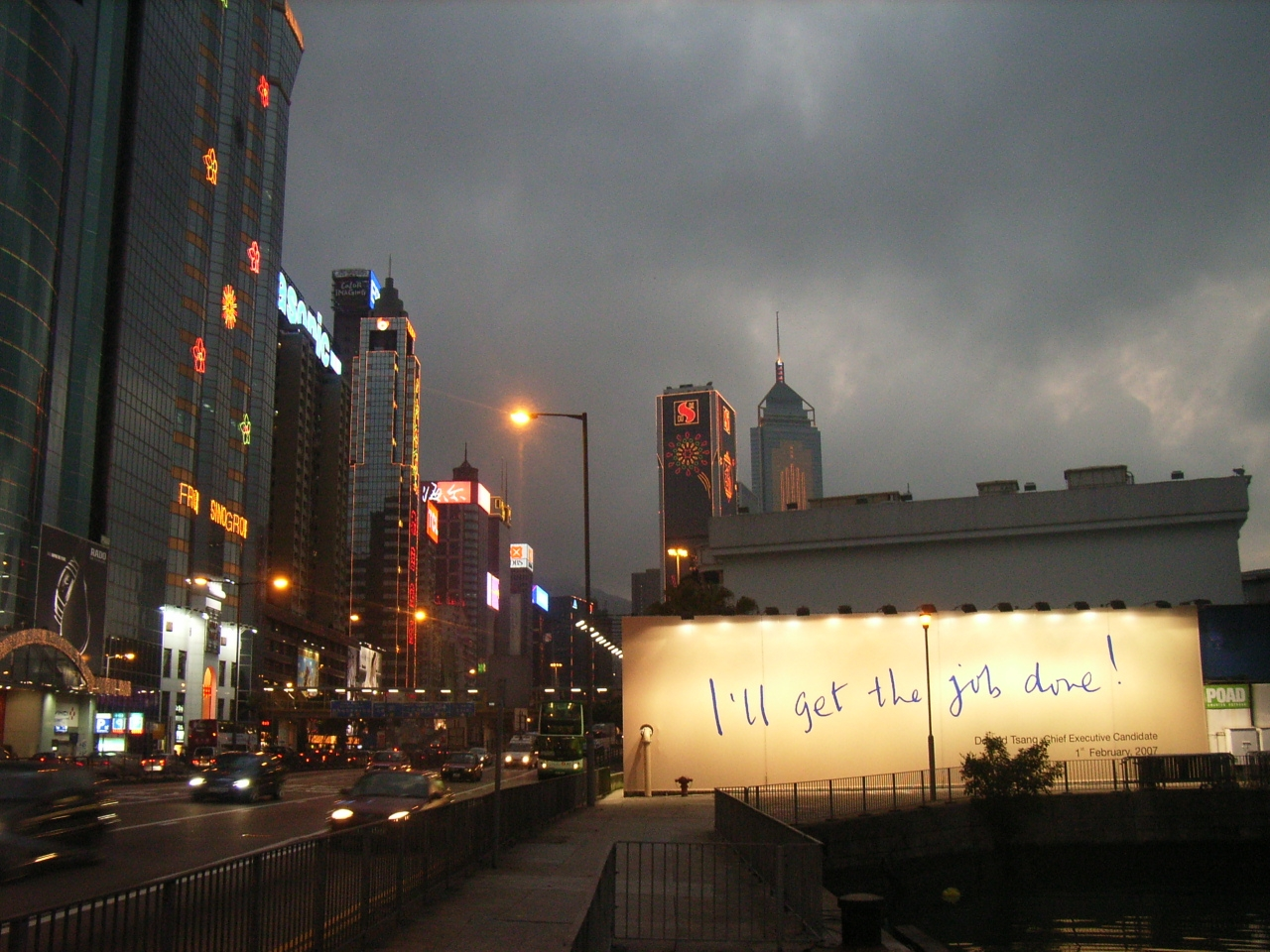
"I'll get the job done!", the campaign slogan of Donald Tsang

This was the first time for Hong Kong to have a broadcasting debate between the Chief Executive candidates. Two debates were held – one on 1 March and the other on 15 March.

The first debate consisted of an audience of 900, mainly the politicians, including the 530 Election Committee members. The public was excluded. The second debate consisted of an audience of 200 people randomly chosen by the University of Hong Kong and the Lingnan University. The first debate was held on 1 March 2007, at the Hong Kong Convention and Exhibition Centre from 7:00 pm to 8:30 pm, presided by Rita Fan; the second 90-minute debate was held on 15 March 2007 at the TVB City in Tseung Kwan O, co-organized by the 8 main media corporations in Hong Kong. Both debates were broadcast live by TVB, ATV and RTHK.

=== The first debate ===
==== Format ====
530 members of the Election Committee attended the forum, which was stage-managed. The general public was not allowed to attend the debate but their questions to the candidates were collected in advance through fax or e-mails. A total of 3,409 questions were submitted, and 6 of them were selected for the candidates to answer in the debate.

Direct questioning between the candidates was prohibited. The 90-minute debate was divided into 4 sessions. The two candidates were first given 3 minutes to deliver their election platform; Leong went first. After that there was a question-and-answer session. Each of the chosen questioners had 30 seconds in which to raise questions, and the candidates were allowed 20 minutes to respond to each question without using any props, notes, charts or diagrams. After the Q&A, Tsang was the first one to give his conclusion of the debate.

==== Issues ====
Questions raised by 22 members of the Election Committee and 7 citizens covered areas of democracy (doubts on universal suffrage), economic development, educational reform, etc. The issues which drew most heated argument from both candidates concerned democratic development and the relationship between central and SAR governments.

Leong challenged Tsang to support the target of universal suffrage in 2012. Leong suggested the central government's pragmatic and rational attitude was amply demonstrated by the total trust it put in Tsang, once considered a remnant of the British colonial government. Tsang said it would be "dangerous and unworkable" if his opponent was elected.

==== Protests ====
Election Committee member "Long Hair" Leung Kwok-hung interrupted the debate just before the introduction of election platform by Tsang. He mocked both by putting on a bowtie and put a handkerchief in his pocket, adopted clichés of Tsang and Leong respectively. He crawled like a dog in front of the stage and shouted slogans opposing the small-circle election, but was escorted out by 10 security guards. Other organisations also protested outside the venue concerned mainly about the lack of public participation in the forum, and also some social problems which existed in society.

==== Outcome ====
The first debate attracted 1.863 million viewers, approximately 27 percent of the local population.

Most of the local newspapers did not report much on the contents of the election platform proposed by the two candidates, but rather reported more on their debating skills, behaviour, presentation and even how they dressed in the forum.

A survey conducted by the University of Hong Kong shows that after the debate Tsang still led. A public opinion programme organised by the University of Hong Kong has shown that 46.5% of the 510 respondents considered Tsang outperformed Leong while 33.9% of them thought the opposite. 67.9% of them said that they would vote for Tsang as the Chief Executive and only 21.7% of them would vote for Leong if they had the voting right. Tsang apparently won public support because of his strength in the details of policy issues, while Leong's understanding of public finances and other policies seemed to be weaker than Tsang.

Both candidates gained increased support from the general public after debate as indicated by the survey results, compared to a previous survey where only 65.3% and 16.1% of the respondents support Tsang and Leong being elected respectively. Nevertheless, all the figures reflect an unexpected performance displayed by Leong, who adopted a combative approach and seized every opportunity to attack Tsang's record, especially in terms of environmental protection and the possibility of universal suffrage by 2012. On the other hand, Tsang appeared to present himself as a statesman defending his record, rather than attacking the weaknesses of Leong.

A survey conducted right after the debate by the Public Governance Programme of Lingnan University showed that 61.4% of the 611 respondents "supported" Tsang while just 25.9% of them supported Leong. In the survey, 26.7% of the respondents had an improved impression upon Tsang after the debate; while 13.1% of them had a less favourable impression, and 57.4% of them had an unchanged impression of Tsang. By contrast, 36.5% of the 611 respondents had a more favourable impression of Leong. Liberal Party Chairman, James Tien said that although Tsang's campaign office apparently "lacked preparation", his performance "would not undermine the central government's support for him".

=== The second debate ===
==== Format ====
200 members of the general public were allowed to participate in this event to raise questions. This debate was divided into three sessions: social livelihood, politics and economics as themes for each session. During the debate, the two candidates respectively answered nine questions from the audience and six from the media.

==== Issues ====
During the second debate, Tsang said that the commitment to universal suffrage was enshrined in the Basic Law, a national policy which nobody could change. He promised he will start planning and negotiating the issue on the universal suffrage within the coming 5 years if he was successfully renewed in the post.

On the other hand, faced with certain defeat at the poll, Leong said that "Hong Kong has triumphed in this first ever contested race in Hong Kong and China's democratic history." He vowed to return in the 2012 universal suffrage election. In response, NPC chairman Wu Bangguo, said the final decision on matters related to Hong Kong's political system rested with the central government and not the SAR government.

==== Outcome ====
According to the second survey on Chief Executive Forum carried out by the University of Hong Kong, the instant poll showed that 38.9% of 520 respondents thought that Tsang's performance of was better than that of Leong, while 39.3% of the respondents thought Leong performed better. The result shows a significant difference, compared with the first instant poll, in which Mr. Leong was behind his rival.

== Opinion polling ==
Donald Tsang dominated in the polls despite his relative inactivity and lack of eloquence in public debate. Alan Leong never achieved a rating higher than 20 percent in the rolling opinion polls conducted by the Hong Kong University Public Opinion Programme between 26 February and 23 March.

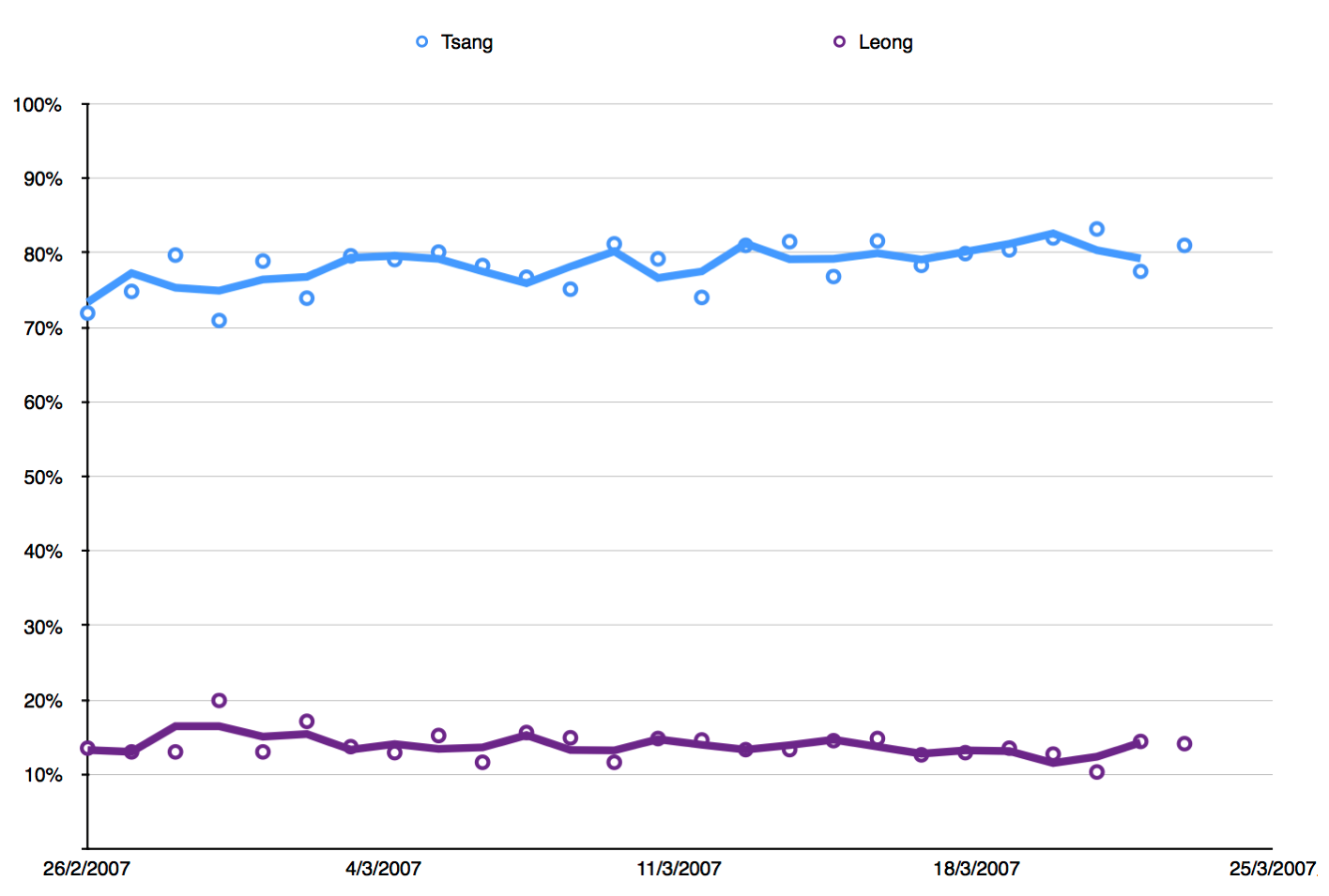

Date(s) conducted	Polling source	Donald Tsang	Alan Leong
23 March	HKUPOP	81.0%	14.1%
22 March	HKUPOP	77.5%	14.4%
21 March	HKUPOP	83.2%	10.3%
20 March	HKUPOP	82.0%	12.7%
19 March	HKUPOP	80.4%	13.5%
18 March	HKUPOP	79.9%	12.9%
17 March	HKUPOP	78.3%	12.6%
16 March	HKUPOP	81.6%	14.8%
15 March	HKUPOP	76.8%	14.5%
14 March	HKUPOP	81.5%	13.3%
13 March	HKUPOP	81.0%	13.3%
12 March	HKUPOP	74.0%	14.6%
11 March	HKUPOP	79.2%	14.8%
10 March	HKUPOP	81.2%	11.6%
9 March	HKUPOP	75.1%	14.9%
8 March	HKUPOP	76.7%	15.6%
7 March	HKUPOP	78.3%	11.6%
6 March	HKUPOP	80.1%	15.2%
5 March	HKUPOP	79.1%	12.9%
4 March	HKUPOP	79.6%	13.7%
3 March	HKUPOP	73.9%	17.1%
2 March	HKUPOP	78.9%	13.0%
1 March	HKUPOP	70.9%	19.9%
28 February	HKUPOP	79.7%	13.0%
27 February	HKUPOP	74.8%	13.0%
26 February	HKUPOP	71.9%	13.5%

== Voting ==
=== Result ===
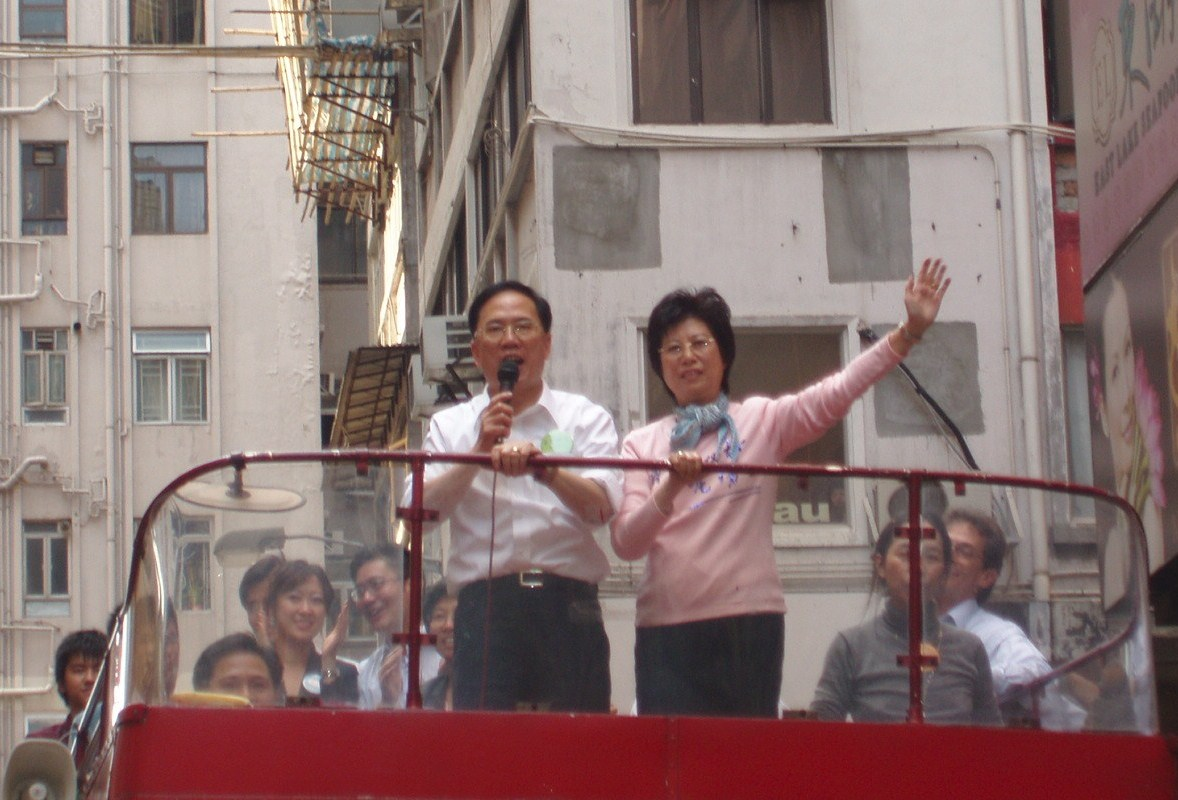
Donald Tsang and spouse on a victory trip following the election

25 March 2007 Hong Kong Chief Executive election results
Party	Candidate	Votes	%	±%
Nonpartisan	Donald Tsang	649	84.07	
Civic	Alan Leong	123	27.14	
Total votes		772	100	
Total valid votes		772	97.85	
Rejected ballots		17	2.15	
Turnout		789	99.12	N/A
Registered electors		796		

=== Controversy ===
In an apparent attempt to maximise votes for Tsang, Stanley Ho had suggested that those casting blank votes could be tracked down. This caused a furore, prompting a senior mainland official and top local advisers to Beijing to defend the secrecy of the Chief Executive election vote.

Ho later issued a statement clarifying: "According to traditional wisdom, those who make mischief will one day be unveiled," "I was merely reminding those who intend to cast blank votes that the day will come when they will be unveiled. My remarks carried no other implication."

== Protests ==
Some pro-democracy politicians boycotted the CE and EC elections, claiming that to participate would legitimise undemocratic practices.

Emily Lau of The Frontier was one such critic. "It will be a beautiful misunderstanding if some people believe they need not do anything more and that universal suffrage will be introduced some day", she said.

On the day before the EC elections, the Civil Human Rights Front organised a protest where they walked backwards around LegCo 7 times, then marched slowly to Central Government Offices, symbolising the great leap backwards for democracy which they believed the EC represented. Leung Kwok-hung trapped himself in a giant bird cage and followed Leong around on EC election day to protest Leong's participation.
