= Civic Party =

Civic Party 公民黨
- Abbreviation: CP
- Founded: 19 March 2006
- Dissolved: 27 March 2024
- Preceded by: Article 45 Concern; Group
- Headquarters: Unit 202, 2/F, Block B, Sea View Estate, 4–6 Watson Road, North Point, Hong Kong
- Youth wing: Young Civics
- Membership (2021): ~849
- Ideology: Constitutionalism; Liberalism (Hong Kong); Social liberalism
- Political position: Centre-left
- Regional affiliation: Pro-democracy camp
- Colours: Violet, white and green
- Slogan: The Civic Way, The Fairer Way

Website
- civicparty.hk (archived)

Civic Party
- Traditional Chinese: 公民黨
- Simplified Chinese: 公民党
Transcriptions
Standard Mandarin
- Hanyu Pinyin: Gōngmín dǎng
- Bopomofo: ㄍㄨㄥ ㄇㄧㄣˊ ㄉㄤˇ
- Wade–Giles: Kung^{1}-min^{2} tang^{3}
- Tongyong Pinyin: Gong-mín dǎng
- IPA: [kʊ́ŋ.mǐn tàŋ]
Yue: Cantonese
- Yale Romanization: Gūng màhn dóng
- Jyutping: gung1 man4 dong2
- IPA: [kʊŋ˥ mɐn˩ tɔŋ˧˥]

The Civic Party (CP) was a pro-democracy liberal political party from March 2006 to May 2023 in Hong Kong.

The party was formed in 2006 on the basis of the Basic Law Article 45 Concern Group, which was derived from the Basic Law Article 23 Concern Group that rooted in its opposition to the proposed legislation of the Article 23 of the Basic Law of Hong Kong. Mainly composed of leading barristers, the party first contested in the 2007 Chief Executive election with Alan Leong unsuccessfully challenged incumbent Donald Tsang elected by the Election Committee.

The Civic Party joined the League of Social Democrats (LSD) in the "Five Constituencies Referendum" campaign in 2010 to pressure the government to implement the universal suffrage of the Chief Executive and Legislative Council in 2012 over the constitutional reform package. In the 2012 Legislative Council election, the party took an aggressive electoral strategy, which resulted in winning six seats and overtaking the Democratic Party in vote share.

In light of the rise of localism, the Civic Party speeded up its rejuvenation and localisation after its candidate Alvin Yeung defeated Edward Leung of the Hong Kong Indigenous in the 2016 New Territories East by-election, which Yeung became the party leader later in the year. The party received a largest victory by winning 32 seats in the 2019 District Council election in the midst of the citywide anti-government protests.

In July 2020 after Beijing installed the national security law on Hong Kong, three of the five Civic incumbent legislators, Alvin Yeung, Kwok Ka-ki and Dennis Kwok were barred from running for re-election and subsequently unseated, which resulted in the mass resignations of the pro-democracy legislators, leaving the party with no representation in the legislature for the first time and Yeung's resignation as party leader. After all local councillors resigned from office or from the party in late 2021 as threats of disqualification loomed, the party kept a low profile. The party dissolved itself in May 2023.

== Party beliefs ==
The party was considered part of the pan-democracy camp in the Legislative Council. The party's objectives were:

- to promote a democratic political system in Hong Kong built upon universal suffrage, the rule of law, constitutionalism, civil liberties and equality of opportunities for all Hong Kong people;
- to provide support and services for members of the Party who hold elected public office and members of the Party who stand in elections as candidates to such public office as is open to election in Hong Kong;
- to foster a sustainable community through partnership with civil society groups;
- to promote civic education;
- to foster social cohesion and undertake community projects for the well being of Hong Kong residents.

During the 2008 Legislative Council election campaign, candidates from the party also called for the introduction of a statutory minimum wage and a competition law.

== History ==
=== Founding ===
The Civic Party was founded on 19 March 2006 as a coalition of six incumbent members of the Legislative Council. Four of them, Audrey Eu, Alan Leong, Ronny Tong and Margaret Ng were barristers, who had already cooperated as an informal bloc called the Article 45 Concern Group, reflecting their efforts to realise universal suffrage with Article 45 and 68 of the Hong Kong Basic Law. They were joined by two other incumbents, the then functional constituency Legislative Councillors Mandy Tam (Accountancy) and Fernando Cheung (Social Welfare), as well as a number of pan-democratic academics. Political scientist Professor Kuan Hsin-chi became the first Chairman of the Civic Party and Audrey Eu the first Leader of the party. At the time of formation, the party was holding six seats in the Legislative Council, making it the fourth largest party.

The Article 45 Concern Group was transferred from the Article 23 Concern Group launched in 2002 opposing the legislation of the Hong Kong Basic Law Article 23. The barristers rose to fame as the issue escalated to a full-scale civil movement in the mid summer of 2003. Alan Leong and Ronny Tong were both able to elected to the Legislative Council in the geographical constituency direct elections in Kowloon East and New Territories East respectively.

=== Eu leadership (2006–2011) ===
==== Chief Executive bid and legislative election (2006–2008) ====
The Civic Party's first electoral test was its decision to run Alan Leong in the March 2007 "small circle" Chief Executive election, challenging incumbent Donald Tsang. The party and its ally actively fill candidates running in the 800-member December 2006 Election Committee Subsector elections and won more than 100 seats. Leong's winning sufficient nomination votes to enter the race was viewed as a breakthrough in what previously had been seen as an entirely Beijing-orchestrated process. However a safe margin in the Election Committee to assure Donald Tsang re-election, Leong eventually lost by 123 to 649 votes as a result. In the November 2007 District Council elections, the party contested 42 constituencies. Five incumbents now under the Civic Party flag were re-elected, and three rookies picked up new seats.

With a slate of widely respected legislators projecting an image of competence and ability, the Civic Party went into the September 2008 Legislative Council elections heavily favoured, with some pundits predicting they would take over as the flagship of the pan-democratic movement from what at the time seemed to be an ailing Democratic Party. However, the party's results failed to match pre-election predictions. Ronny Tong only took the sixth out of seven seats in his constituency, Alan Leong the final seat. While the Civics won a new seat for District Councilor Tanya Chan by placing Audrey Eu after Chan in the candidate list in Hong Kong Island, Mandy Tam's internal battles with Accountancy functional constituency (FC) cost Tam her seat. In addition, Fernando Cheung's decision to give up his Social Welfare FC seat in favour of running in the New Territories West geographic constituency (GC) proved disastrous. Finally, Kowloon West GC candidate Claudia Mo found herself under fierce attack by League of Social Democrats (LSD) chairman Wong Yuk-man, which the Civics believe cost Mo the election. As a result, the Civic Party dropped one seat in total, while retaining the three seats in the geographical constituency and one seat in the Legal FC and also gaining a new seat in Hong Kong Island, but losing two seats in the Accountancy and Social Welfare FCs.

The Civic Party's 2008 electoral performance led most observers to conclude the party needed to rectify its weakness at the grassroots. At the party's 6 December internal elections, Professor Kuan Hsin-chi was re-elected chairman and Audrey Eu remained as Party Leader. Vice-Chairman Fernando Cheung and Treasurer Mandy Tam, however, resigned to take responsibility for their defeats. While Alan Leong replaced Cheung as vice-chairman, Cheung's duties as party strategist were picked up by Secretary-General Kenneth Chan Ka-lok. Tanya Chan was elected Chairman of the "Young Civics", the party's youth wing.

Newly elected Civic Party Secretary-General Kenneth Chan suggested that the party should transformed from the elitist "barristers' club" image of the "blue-blooded" squad of barristers to a proper political party which could expand their base or groom the next generation of leaders for the party.

==== "Five Constituencies Referendum" (2009–2011) ====
The party was member of the Alliance for Universal Suffrage which consisted of all the pro-democracy groups to strive for the 2012 universal suffrage of the Chief Executive and Legislative Council. In response to the electoral reform package proposed by the government, the party joined hand with the League of Social Democrats, which belonged to the relatively radical wing the pan-democracy camp, to launch the "Five Constituency Referendum" by having five legislators resigning and participating in a territory-wide by-election to demand genuine universal suffrage. The claim of by-election as referendum expectedly received serve attacks from the Beijing government and the pro-Beijing camp in Hong Kong as unconstitutional. The Democratic Party refused to join the movement and sought for a less confrontational way to negotiate with Beijing. The election turnout showed with only 17.7 percent of the registered voters voted despite Alan Leong and Tanya Chan were re-elected. After the by-election Chairwoman Audrey Eu was invited by the Chief Executive Donald Tsang to a televised debate over the reform package. Audrey Eu was widely perceived to have scored an overwhelming victory over Tsang in the debate, yet the reform package was ultimately passed with the support of the Democratic Party despite Civic Party voted against it.

=== Leong leadership (2011–2016) ===
==== 2011/12 elections (2011–2014) ====
In January 2011 party leadership elections, there was first changes at the top for the five-year-old party. Alan Leong took over from Audrey Eu as Party Leader uncontestedly, while Kenneth Chan beat Professor Joseph Cheng by an 11-vote margin after a heated campaign that saw some complaining about the fairness of the contest. Chan campaigned on a platform that was endorsed by most of the party veterans. Alan Leong denied the speculations of any intra-party factional struggle.

In the 2011 District Council elections, the Civic Party was hammered by the pro-Beijing media due to its close ties with the legal advisers on the lawsuit of the right of abode for foreign domestic workers who represented one such Filipina. The party was greatly disadvantaged by this as many HK residents fear granting Filipinos permanent residency would affect them. The party received great defeat in the election with only seven out of 41 candidates were elected. Party leader Alan Leong blamed the pro-Beijing camp's vast resources as the cause of defeat.

The 2012 Legislative Council elections were held on 9 September 2012. Civic Party won a seat in each geographical constituency, five seats in total, and a seat in Legal functional constituency. These six seats made the Civic Party the second largest political party in Legislative Council and stood side by side with the Democratic Party as the largest pro-democratic party, though the popular votes gained by the Civics in the geographical constituency surpassed the Democrats. The party was blamed for its electoral strategy by putting heavyweights Audrey Eu and Tanya Chan in New Territories West and Hong Kong Island to attract too many votes at the expense on the other pan-democratic parties. Although both Eu and Chan received about 70,000 votes in their constituencies, they failed to get re-elected and the seats went to pro-Beijing candidates Leung Che-cheung and Wong Kwok-hing which made the pro-Beijing camp controlled the majority of the seats in those constituencies despite fewer votes.

==== Post-Umbrella Revolution (2014–2016) ====
On 22 June 2015, few days after the historic legislative vote over the 2015 Hong Kong electoral reform, Ronny Tong announced that he would quit the Civic party that he co-founded, adding that he noted the line the Civic Party had taken since the end of 2009 had deviated from its founding values. He would also resign from the Legislative Council as he said it was inappropriate for him to retain his seat in the legislature because he stood for election as a Civic Party member.

In the 2015 District Council election, the Civics won total of 10 seats, although legislator Kenneth Chan failed to win a seat in South Horizons East.

In Legislative Council by-election to fill the seat left vacant by Ronny Tong, Alvin Yeung, a young barrister defeated Beijing-loyalist Democratic Alliance for the Betterment and Progress of Hong Kong (DAB) candidate Holden Chow and localist camp Hong Kong Indigenous candidate Edward Leung Tin-kei, receiving 160,880 votes.

In the September's Legislative Council general election, the Civics retained all their six seats with Tanya Chan replaced Kenneth Chan in Hong Kong Island and Jeremy Tam took over retiring leader Alan Leong's seat in Kowloon East.

=== Yeung leadership (2016–2021) ===
On 1 October 2016, as Alan Leong retired from the Legislative Council, he has also stepped down from the post of Party Leader, and the Executive Committee of the party appointed Alvin Yeung as the acting party leader. Yeung officially became the party leader in November, with Leong succeeding Audrey Eu as party chair. On 14 November 2016, the party's legislator Claudia Mo resigned from the party citing differences over localism and other issues which left the party five seats in the council.

In the 2019 District Council election, the Civic Party won 32 seats, ranked second amongst all parties. After the imposition of national security law in 2020 and relevant resolutions, party co-founder Tanya Chan left the party, while all legislators of the Civic Party were unseated for "unpatriotic" or resigned to protest against the decision. The arrest of leader Alvin Yeung, and ex-legislators Jeremy Tam and Kwok Ka-ki in 2021 for "subversion" dealt a major blow to the party. Yeung quit the party later that year. In July 2021, all local councillors resigned from office or from the party as threats of disqualification loomed. The party has since turned low profile, and did not join the 2021 legislative election.

=== Disbandment ===
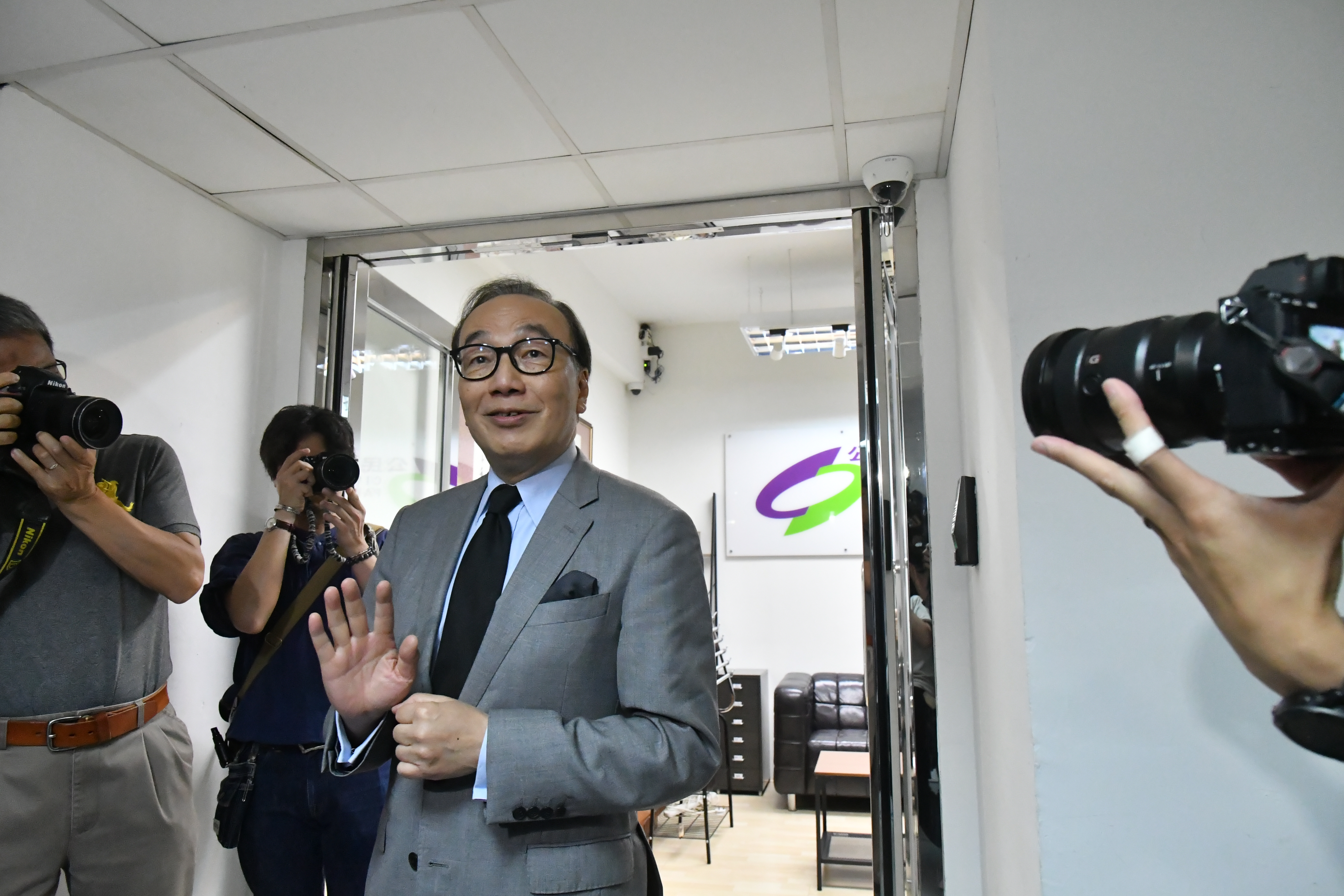
Alan Leong in May 2023 amidst the anticipated disbandment of the party

In December 2022, the party announced its plans to disband after it failed to form a new executive committee due to a lack of incumbent executives seeking re-election and nominations for new executives. A general meeting was held on 27 May 2023 to dissolve the party. Party chair Alan Leong also announced that he would retire from politics after the Civic Party's dissolution. The Civic Party was officially delisted on 27 March 2024 upon completion of liquidation.

== Structure ==
The party was managed by the twenty-member Executive Committee, headed by the chairman and Leader. It had five District Branches, and a youth branch known as the Young Civics.

The admittance of any new ordinary member had to be backed by two existing ordinary members or founding members. In addition, a prospective member needed to complete local branch work for one year before being inducted as an ordinary member.

== Election results ==
=== Chief Executive elections ===
Election	Candidate	No. of votes	% of votes
2007	Alan Leong	123	15.93

=== Legislative Council elections ===
Election	Number of popular votes	% of popular votes	GC seats	FC seats	EC seats	Total seats	+/−	Position
2008	207,000	13.66	4	1		5 / 60	1▼	4th
2012	255,007▲	14.08▲	5	1		6 / 70	1▲	2nd▲
2016	207,855▼	9.59▼	5	1		6 / 70	0	4th▼
2021	Did not contest		0	0	0	0 / 90	0	N/A

=== District Council elections ===
Election	Number of popular votes	% of popular votes	Total elected seats	+/−
2007	48,837	4.29	8 / 405	2▲
2011	47,603▼	4.03▼	7 / 412	5▼
2015	52,346▲	3.62▼	10 / 431	3▲
2019	141,713▲	4.83▲	32 / 452	20▲

== Leadership ==
=== Overall structure ===
The Civic Party operated with a dual-leadership model, with a Leader and a Chairperson. In general, the Leader was an elected legislator who lead the party within the Legislative Council, while the Chairperson was typically not a legislator so that he or she could focus on the overall development of the party.

=== Leaders ===
No.	Name	Portrait	Constituency	Took office	Left office	Tenure length
1	Audrey Eu (1953– )		Hong Kong Island	19 March 2006	8 January 2011	4 years and 296 days
2	Alan Leong (1958– )		Kowloon East	9 January 2011	30 September 2016	5 years and 266 days
3	Alvin Yeung (1981– )		New Territories East	1 October 2016	28 November 2020	4 years and 59 days

=== Chairpersons ===
No.	Name	Portrait	Took office	Left office	Tenure length
1	Kuan Hsin-chi (1940– )		19 March 2006	8 January 2011	4 years and 296 days
2	Kenneth Chan (1968– )		9 January 2011	9 June 2012	1 year and 153 days
3	Audrey Eu (1953– )		1 December 2012	18 November 2016	3 years and 354 days
4	Alan Leong (1958– )		19 November 2016	27 May 2023	6 years and 190 days

=== Vice-chairpersons (external affairs) ===
1. Fernando Cheung, 2006–2008
2. Albert Lai, 2008–2012
3. Tanya Chan, 2012–2020
4. Jeremy Tam, 2020–2021

=== Vice-chairpersons (internal affairs) ===
1. Albert Lai, 2006–2008
2. Alan Leong SC, 2008–2011
3. Margaret Ng, 2011–2012
4. Stephen Chan Ching-kiu, 2012–2016
5. Billy Lay Yan-piau, 2016–2023

=== Secretaries general ===
1. Joseph Cheng, 2006–2008
2. Kenneth Chan, 2008–2011
3. Bill Lay Yan-piau, 2011–2016
4. Chan Kai-yuen, 2016–2020
5. Jessica Leung Ka-sin, 2020–2023

=== Treasurers ===
1. Mandy Tam, 2006–2008
2. Amy Yung Wing-sheung, 2008–2011
3. Tommy Wong Wai-ming, 2011–2012
4. Janos Choy Kai-sing, 2012–2023
