= Kwun Tong On Tai (constituency) =

Hong Kong constituency

- 觀塘安泰
- Elected constituency for the Kwun Tong District Council
- Boundary of Kwun Tong On Tai in Kwun Tong District
- District: Kwun Tong
- Legislative Council constituency: Kowloon East
- Population: 20,739 (2019)
- Electorate: 7,139 (2019)

Current constituency
- Created: 2019
- Number of members: One
- Member: Lam Wai (FPHE)
- Created from: Po Tat

Kwun Tong On Tai (Chinese: 觀塘安泰) is one of the 40 constituencies in the Kwun Tong District.

Created for the 2019 District Council elections, the constituency returns one district councillor to the Kwun Tong District Council, with an election every four years.

Kwun Tong On Tai loosely covers part of the public housing estates On Tai Estate, Shun Lee Estate and Shun On Estate. It has projected population of 20,739.

== Councillors represented ==
Election	Member	Party
2019	Lam Wai	FPHE

== Election results ==
=== 2010s ===
Kwun Tong District Council Election, 2019: Kwun Tong On Tai
Party	Candidate	Votes	%	±%
FPHE	Lam Wai	2,901	56.42	
Democratic	Lin Kuan-tsun	2,241	43.58	
Majority		660	12.84	
Turnout		5,152	72.24	
FPHE win (new seat)				
