= Shun On Estate =

Public housing estate in Shun Lee, Hong Kong

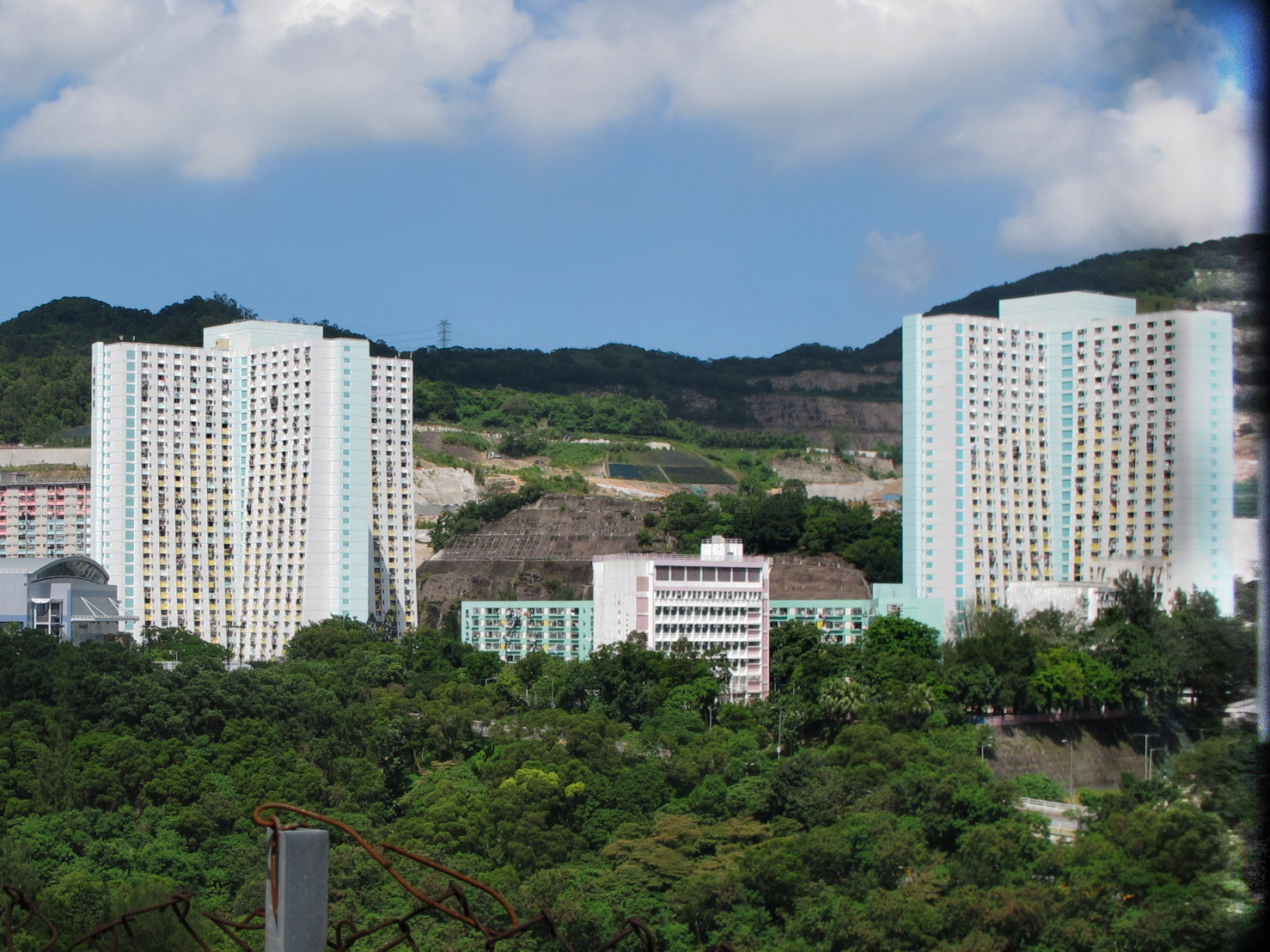
- Shun On Estate
- Interactive map of Shun On Estate

General information
- Location: 1 Lee On Road, Shun Lee; Kowloon, Hong Kong
- Coordinates: 22.32851°N 114.22613°E
- Status: Completed
- Category: Public rental housing
- Population: 7,511 (2016)
- No. of blocks: 4
- No. of units: 3,002

Construction
- Constructed: 1978; 48 years ago
- Authority: Hong Kong Housing Authority

Shun On Estate (Chinese: 順安邨) is a public housing estate in Shun Lee, Kowloon, Hong Kong near On Tai Estate, Shun Lee Estate, Shun Tin Estate and Shun Lee Tsuen Sports Centre. It consists of three residential blocks completed in 1978 and 1980 respectively.

== History ==
On 17 February 2017, a 16-year-old boy was arrested for targeting an eleven-year-old girl at Shun On Estate the previous day shortly after she got off the minibus to return home.

== Houses ==
Name	Chinese name	Building type	Completed
On Chung House	安頌樓	Cruciform	1979
On Yat House	安逸樓	Cruciform	1979
On Kwan House	安群樓	Old Slab	1980
On Chak House	安澤樓	Old Slab	1980

== Demographics ==
According to the 2016 by-census, Shun On Estate had a population of 7,511. The median age was 50.7 and the majority of residents (98 per cent) were of Chinese ethnicity. The average household size was 2.5 people. The median monthly household income of all households (i.e. including both economically active and inactive households) was HK$20,000.

== Politics ==
Shun On Estate is located in On Lee constituency of the Kwun Tong District Council. It was formerly represented by Choy Chak-hung, who was elected in the 2019 elections until July 2021.

== See also ==
- Shun Lee
