= Hip Hong (constituency) =

Hong Kong constituency

- Elected constituency for the Kwun Tong District Council
- Boundary of Hip Hong in Kwun Tong District
- District: Kwun Tong
- Legislative Council constituency: Kowloon East
- Population: 16,091 (2019)
- Electorate: 7,313 (2019)

Current constituency
- Created: 1994
- Number of members: One
- Member: Vacant

Hip Hong (Chinese: 協康) is one of the 37 constituencies in the Kwun Tong District of Hong Kong which was created in 1994 and last held by nonpartisan Li-Ka tat.

The constituency loosely covers Cheung Wo Court and Wan Hon Estate around the Shui Ning Street, Hip Wo Street and Hong Wing Road in Ngau Tau Kok with the estimated population of 16,091.

== Councillors represented ==
Election	Member	Party
1994	Leung Fu-wing	Nonpartisan
2011	Bunny Chan Chung-bun	Nonpartisan
2019	Li Ka-tat→Vacant (Note: Resigned on 18 April 2021 after being arrested under national security law.)	CAP

== Election results ==
=== 2010s ===
Kwun Tong District Council Election, 2019: Hip Hong
Party	Candidate	Votes	%	±%
PfD	Li Ka-tat	2,612	52.86	
Nonpartisan	Bunny Chan Chung-bun	2,329	47.14	−7.16
Majority		283	5.72	
Turnout		4,954	67.79	
PfD gain from Nonpartisan		Swing		

Kwun Tong District Council Election, 2015: Hip Hong
Party	Candidate	Votes	%	±%
Nonpartisan	Bunny Chan Chung-bun	1,831	54.30	−11.74
Nonpartisan	Edith Wong Yi-ting	907	26.90	
Nonpartisan	Chau Chung-ping	634	18.80	
Majority		924	27.84	
Turnout		3,372	46.40	
Nonpartisan hold		Swing		

Kwun Tong District Council Election, 2011: Hip Hong
Party	Candidate	Votes	%	±%
Nonpartisan	Bunny Chan Chung-bun	1,715	66.04	
LSD	David Kan San-wa	882	33.96	+1.87
Majority		883	33.08	
Turnout		2,597	34.17	
Nonpartisan gain from Nonpartisan		Swing		

=== 2000s ===
Kwun Tong District Council Election, 2007: Hip Hong
Party	Candidate	Votes	%	±%
Nonpartisan	Leung Fu-wing	1,833	67.91	
LSD	David Kan San-wa	866	32.09	
Majority		967	35.82	
Nonpartisan hold		Swing		

Kwun Tong District Council Election, 2003: Hip Hong
Party	Candidate	Votes	%	±%
Nonpartisan	Leung Fu-wing	Uncontested		
Nonpartisan hold		Swing		

=== 1990s ===
Kwun Tong District Council Election, 1999: Hip Hong
Party	Candidate	Votes	%	±%
Nonpartisan	Leung Fu-wing	Uncontested		
Nonpartisan hold		Swing		

Kwun Tong District Board Election, 1994: Hip Hong
Party	Candidate	Votes	%	±%
KTMCFPA	Leung Fu-wing	Uncontested		
KTMCFPA win (new seat)				
