= Shun Tin =

Shun Tin (Chinese: 順天) may refer to:

- Shun Tin (constituency), a constituency in Kwun Tong District
- Shun Tin Estate, a public housing estate in Shun Lee, Hong Kong
- Shun Tin station, a proposed MTR station on the East Kowloon line
