= 2019 Kwun Tong District Council election =

Hong Kong local election

- 24 November 2019

All 40 seats to Kwun Tong District Council 21 seats needed for a majority
- Turnout: 71.1% ▲23.4%
	First party	Second party	Third party
Party	Democratic	DAB	Civic
Last election	3 seats, 14.2%	10 seats, 18.1%	1 seat, 8.7%
Seats before	3	10	1
Seats won	9	6	4
Seat change	▲6	▼4	▲3
Popular vote	38,013	48,534	21,392
Percentage	13.6%	17.3%	7.6%
Swing	▼0.6%	▼0.8%	▼1.1%
	Fourth party	Fifth party
Party	FPHE	FTU
Last election	1 seat, 3.0%	2 seats, 10.8%
Seats before	1	2
Seats won	2	1
Seat change	▲1	▼1
Popular vote	11,832	14,987
Percentage	4.2%	5.3%
Swing	▲1.2%	▼5.5%
- Colours on map indicate winning party for each constituency.

The 2019 Kwun Tong District Council election was held on 24 November 2019 to elect all 40 members to the Kwun Tong District Council.

== Overall election results ==
Before election:

↓
9	28
Pro-democracy	Pro-Beijing

Change in composition:

↓
28	12
Pro-democracy	Pro-Beijing

Kwun Tong District Council election result 2019
Party	Seats	Gains	Losses	Net gain/loss	Seats %	Votes %	Votes	+/−
Independent	17	10	12	−2	42.5	47.5	133,200	
DAB	6	1	5	–4	15.0	17.3	48,534	–0.8
Democratic	9	6	0	+6	22.5	13.6	38,013	−0.6
Civic	4	3	0	+3	10.0	7.6	21,392	−1.1
FTU	1	0	1	−1	2.5	5.3	14,987	−5.5
FPHE	2	2	1	+1	5.0	4.2	11,832	+1.2
PfD	1	1	0	0	2.5	1.8	5,005	
People Power	0	0	0	0	0	1.5	4,327	+0.5
ADPL	0	0	0	0	0.0	1.1	3,006	
