= Li Ka-tat =

Hong Kong social activist and politician

- 李嘉達
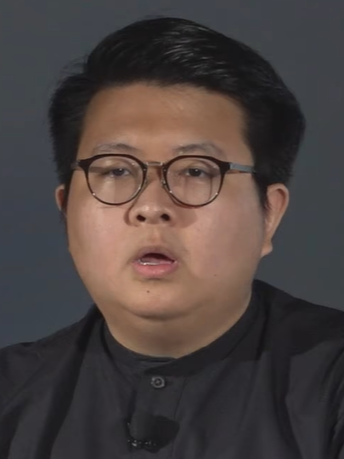
- Li in 2020

Member of the Kwun Tong District Council
- In office 1 January 2020 – 18 April 2021
- Preceded by: Bunny Chan
- Constituency: Hip Hong

Personal details
- Born: 1991 (age 34–35) British Hong Kong
- Citizenship: Hong Kong
- Party: Civic Autonomy Power
- Education: University of Hong Kong
- Occupation: Social worker

Kinda Li Ka-tat (Chinese: 李嘉達; born 1991) is a Hong Kong social activist and politician. He is a former member of the Kwun Tong District Council for Hip Hong.

== Biography ==
Li graduated from the University of Hong Kong with a bachelor's degree in Social Work. He became a registered social worker and obtained a master's degree in Art Therapy. Inspired by the Umbrella Revolution, he set up the local group Civic Autonomy Power with other social work students in Sau Mau Ping, dedicated to community services within the district.

In November 2019, he challenged Bunny Chan, the National People's Congress deputy and Kwun Tong District Council chairman, in Hip Hong's District Council election under the banner of Power for Democracy. Boosted by the pro-democracy wave amid the anti-extradition protests, Li defeated pro-establishment incumbent Chan with 52.86% of the vote and was elected to Kwun Tong's District Council.

In July 2020, Li ran in the pro-democracy primaries for the 2020 Legislative Council election within the Kowloon East constituency. With 15,194 votes, Li came in third place after Joshua Wong and Jeremy Tam, while surpassing People Power's Tam Tak-chi and veteran democrat Wu Chi-wai of the Democratic Party. Li secured one of the five nomination spots in the general election.

On 6 January 2021, Li was among 53 members of the pro-democratic camp who were arrested under the national security law, specifically its provision regarding alleged subversion. The group stood accused of the organisation of and participation in unofficial primary elections held by the camp in July 2020. Li was released on bail on 7 January.

Political offices
Preceded by Bunny Chan	Member of Kwun Tong District Council; Representative for Hip Hong; 2020–2021	Vacant
