= Shun Tin (constituency) =

Hong Kong constituency

- Elected constituency for the Kwun Tong District Council
- Boundary of Shun Tin in Kwun Tong District
- District: Kwun Tong
- Legislative Council constituency: Kowloon East
- Population: 18,307 (2019)
- Electorate: 12,070 (2019)

Current constituency
- Created: 1991 (1st time); 2003 (2nd time)
- Number of members: One
- Member: Mok Kin-shing (Democratic)
- Created from: Shun Tin East; Shun Tin West

Shun Tin (Chinese: 順天) is one of the 37 constituencies in the Kwun Tong District of Hong Kong which was created in 1994 and lastly held by Democratic Mok Kin-shing.

The constituency loosely covers Shun Tin Estate in Sau Mau Ping with the estimated population of 18,307.

== Councillors represented ==
Election	Member	Party
1991	Benjamin Kwok Bit-chun	KTRA
1992	Benjamin Kwok Bit-chun	DAB
1994	Constituency abolished	
2003	Alex Ho Wai-to	Democratic
2005	Alex Ho Wai-to	Independent
2007	Benjamin Kwok Bit-chun	DAB
2015	Mok Kin-shing	Democratic

== Election results ==
=== 2010s ===
Kwun Tong District Council Election, 2019: Shun Tin
Party	Candidate	Votes	%	±%
Democratic	Mok Kin-shing	5,123	62.03	+11.14
DAB	Benjamin Kwok Bit-chun	3,136	37.97	−11.14
Majority		1,987	24.06	
Turnout		8,290	68.74	
Democratic hold		Swing		

Kwun Tong District Council Election, 2015: Shun Tin
Party	Candidate	Votes	%	±%
Democratic	Mok Kin-shing	2,864	50.89	
DAB	Benjamin Kwok Bit-chun	2,764	49.11	
Majority		100	1.78	
Turnout		5,628	49.10	
Democratic gain from DAB		Swing		

Kwun Tong District Council Election, 2011: Shun Tin
Party	Candidate	Votes	%	±%
DAB (FTU)	Benjamin Kwok Bit-chun	Uncontested		
DAB hold		Swing		

=== 2000s ===
Kwun Tong District Council Election, 2007: Shun Tin
Party	Candidate	Votes	%	±%
DAB	Benjamin Kwok Bit-chun	3,357	55.29	+10.02
Democratic Coalition	Alex Ho Wai-to	2,715	44.71	−10.02
Majority		642	10.58	
DAB gain from Independent		Swing		

Kwun Tong District Council Election, 2003: Shun Tin
Party	Candidate	Votes	%	±%
Democratic	Alex Ho Wai-to	3,052	54.73	
DAB	Benjamin Kwok Bit-chun	2,524	45.27	
Majority		528	9.46	
Democratic win (new seat)				

=== 1990s ===
Kwun Tong District Board Election, 1991: Shun Tin
Party	Candidate	Votes	%	±%
KTRA	Benjamin Kwok Bit-chun	1,976	60.15	
Nonpartisan	Chan Lee-shing	1,309	39.85	
Majority		667	20.30	
KTRA win (new seat)				
