= Yau Oi =

Yau Oi may refer to:

- Yau Oi Estate, a public housing estate in Tuen Mun, Hong Kong
- Yau Oi stop, an MTR Light Rail stop adjacent to the estate
