= 2015 Kwun Tong District Council election =

Hong Kong local election

- 22 November 2015

All 37 seats to Kwun Tong District Council 19 seats needed for a majority
- Turnout: 47.7%
	First party	Second party	Third party
Party	DAB	Democratic	FTU
Last election	10 seats, 23.2%	2 seats, 13.9%	1 seat, 2.8%
Seats before	11	2	2
Seats won	10	3	2
Seat change	▼1	▲1	Steady
Popular vote	20,764	16,291	12,347
Percentage	18.1%	14.2%	10.8%
Swing	▼5.1%	▲0.3%	▲8.0%
	Fourth party	Fifth party	Sixth party
Party	Civic	KEC	FPHE
Last election	0 seat, 3.5%	New party	Did not stand
Seats before	0	0	0
Seats won	1	1	1
Seat change	▲1	▲1	▲1
Popular vote	10,001	3,922	3,457
Percentage	8.7%	3.4%	3.0%
Swing	▲5.2%	N/A	N/A
- Colours on map indicate winning party for each constituency.

The 2015 Kwun Tong District Council election was held on 22 November 2015 to elect all 37 members to the Kwun Tong District Council.

== Overall election results ==
Before election:

↓
6	29
Pro-dem	Pro-Beijing

Change in composition:

↓
9	28
Pro-dem	Pro-Beijing

Kwun Tong District Council election result 2015
Party	Seats	Gains	Losses	Net gain/loss	Seats %	Votes %	Votes	+/−
Independent	19	2	2	0	51.4	39.2	44,955	
DAB	10	2	3	–1	27.0	18.1	20,764	–5.1
Democratic	3	2	1	+1	8.1	14.2	16,291	+0.3
FTU	2	0	0	0	5.4	10.8	12,347	+8.0
Civic	1	1	0	+1	2.7	8.7	10,001	−5.2
KEC	1	1	0	+1	2.7	3.4	3,922	
FPHE	1	1	0	+1	2.7	3.0	3,457	
New Forum	0	0	0	0	0	1.5	1,717	
People Power	0	0	0	0	0	1.0	1,134	
