= Ching Ho (constituency) =

- Elected constituency for the North District Council
- Boundary of Ching Ho in North District
- District: North
- Legislative Council constituency: New Territories North
- Population: 20,504 (2019)
- Electorate: 10,705 (2019)

Current constituency
- Created: 2011
- Number of members: One
- Member: Vacant

Ching Ho (Chinese: 清河) is one of the 18 constituencies in the North District, Hong Kong.

The constituency returns one district councillor to the North District Council, with an election every four years.

Ching Ho constituency has an estimated population of 20,504.

== Councillors represented ==
Election	Member	Party
2011	Larm Wai-leung	DAB
2015	Larm Wai-leung	DAB→FPHE/NTAS
2019	Yuen Ho-lun→Vacant (Note: Resigned.)	Nonpartisan

== Election results ==
=== 2010s ===
North District Council Election, 2019: Ching Ho
Party	Candidate	Votes	%	±%
Nonpartisan	Yuen Ho-lun	3,944	53.83	
FPHE (NTAS)	Larm Wai-leung	2,871	39.18	
Nonpartisan	Cheng Shi-lan	512	6.99	
Majority		1,073	4.65	
Turnout		7,341	69.33	
Nonpartisan gain from FPHE		Swing		
