= Hau Shui-pui =

Hong Kong politician (born 1924)

Hau Shui-pui SBS
- 侯 瑞培

Chairman, Kwun Tong District Council
- In office 1997–2003

Personal details
- Born: 21 June 1924 (age 102) Hong Kong
- Occupation: Politician
- Awards: Bronze Bauhinia Star (1998); Silver Bauhinia Star (2004)

Hau Shui-pui, SBS (Chinese: 侯瑞培; born 21 June 1924) is a pro-Beijing politician in Hong Kong. He is the president of the Kwun Tong Residents Association and the Federation of Public Housing Estates. He was also the chairman of the Kwun Tong District Council from 1997 to 2003.

Hau was a long-time kaifong leader who was active in Ngau Tau Kok. He was the president of the Ngau Tau Kok Kaifong Welfare Association and the Kwun Tong Residents Association, a pro-Beijing community association. He also co-founded the Federation of Public Housing Estates in 1985. He was first elected to the Kwun Tong District Board in 1985 in Ngau Tau Kok East constituency. He defeated Law Chun-ngai of the United Democrats of Hong Kong (UDHK) in the 1991 District Board elections, but failed to get elected in the first direct election to the Legislative Council in 1991, losing to the pro-democracy candidates Szeto Wah of the United Democrats and Fred Li of the Meeting Point.

He was re-elected uncontestedly to the Kwun Tong District Board in 1994. He was appointed Hong Kong Affairs Advisor and the Selection Committee which was responsible for electing the first Chief Executive of Hong Kong and Provisional Legislative Council on the eve of the handover of Hong Kong. He became the chairman of the Kwun Tong Provisional District Board in 1997 and the Kwun Tong District Council chairman until his retirement in 2003.

Hau was awarded by Bronze Bauhinia Star in 1998 and Silver Bauhinia Star in 2004.

Political offices
| Preceded by Winnie Poon | Chairman of Kwun Tong District Council; 1997–2003 | Succeeded by Bunny Chan |
