= 2011 Kwun Tong District Council election =

Hong Kong local election

- 6 November 2011

35 (of the 40) seats to Kwun Tong District Council 21 seats needed for a majority
- Turnout: 41.7%
	First party	Second party	Third party
Party	DAB	Democratic	FTU
Last election	10 seats, 22.1%	3 seats, 11.0%	Did not run
Seats before	9	3	0
Seats won	12	2	1
Seat change	▲3	▼1	▲1
Popular vote	21,927	13,166	2,677
Percentage	23.2%	13.9%	2.8%
Swing	▲1.1%	▲2.9%	N/A
- Colours on map indicate winning party for each constituency.

The 2011 Kwun Tong District Council election was held on 6 November 2011 to elect all 35 elected members to the 40-member District Council.

== Overall election results ==
Before election:

↓
8	1	25
Pro-dem	I.	Pro-Beijing

Change in composition:

↓
6	1	28
Pro-dem	I.	Pro-Beijing

Kwun Tong District Council election result 2011
Party	Seats	Gains	Losses	Net gain/loss	Seats %	Votes %	Votes	+/−
Independent	20	0	2	−2	57.1	48.3	45,684	
DAB	12	3	0	+3	34.3	23.2	21,927	+1.1
Democratic	2	0	1	−1	5.7	13.9	13,166	+2.9
Civic	0	0	0	0	0	3.5	3,335	−2.4
FTU	1	1	0	+1	2.9	2.8	2,677	
NPP	0	0	0	0	0	1.0	941	
People Power	0	0	0	0	0	0.5	517	
