= Yau Oi Estate =

Estate in Tuen Mun, New Terrotories

Coordinates: 22.3878°N 113.9735°E

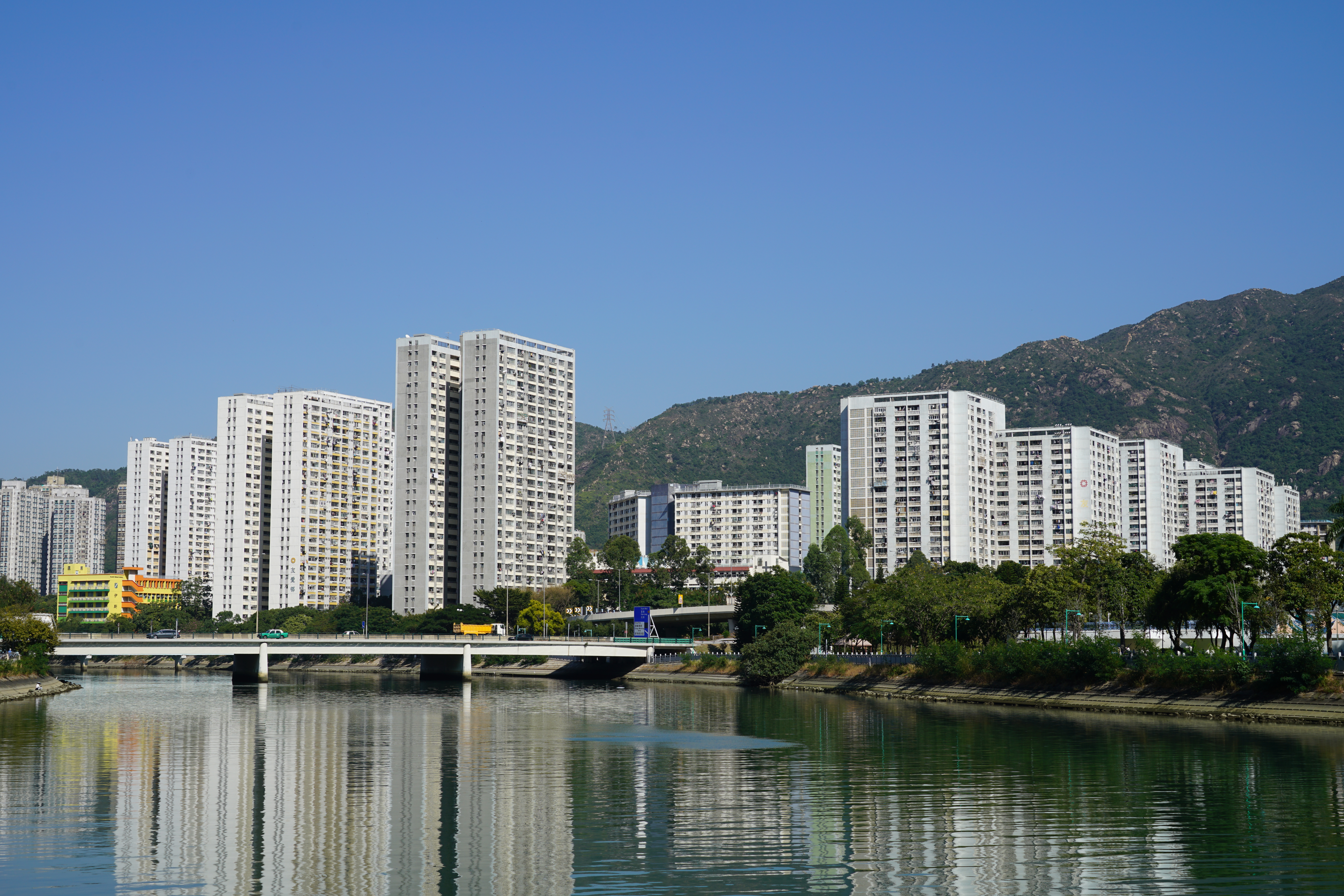
Yau Oi Estate

Yau Oi Estate (Chinese: 友愛邨) is a public housing estate in Tuen Mun, New Territories, Hong Kong near Light Rail Yau Oi stop. It was the third public housing estate built in Tuen Mun between 1980 and 1981 on reclaimed land of Castle Peak Bay. Consisting of 11 residential blocks, it was the largest single subsidized housing development in Hong Kong, with 9,153 units and a population of more than 35,000.

== Houses ==
Name	Type	Completion
Oi Ming House	Double H	1980
Oi Lai House	Double H	1980
Oi Hei House	Double H	1980
Oi Chi House	Double H	1980
Oi Shun House	Twin Tower	1981
Oi Yee House	Twin Tower	1981
Oi Lim House	Twin Tower	1981
Oi Yung House	Old Slab	1980
Oi Fai House	Triple H	1980
Oi Tak House	Triple H	1980
Oi Lok House	Old Slab	1981

== Education ==
Yau Oi Estate is in Primary One Admission (POA) School Net 71. Within the school net are multiple aided schools (operated independently but funded with government money); no government schools are in the school net.

== See also ==
- Public housing in Hong Kong
- List of public housing estates in Hong Kong
