= 2003 Kwun Tong District Council election =

Hong Kong local election

- 23 November 2003

34 (of the 42) seats to Kwun Tong District Council 22 seats needed for a majority
- Turnout: 47.6%
	First party	Second party	Third party
Party	Democratic	DAB	Liberal
Last election	9 seats, 32.2%	6 seats, 24.0%	Did not run
Seats before	7	6	1
Seats won	9	4	1
Seat change	▲2	▼2	Steady
Popular vote	26,181	23,244	332
Percentage	25.9%	23.0%	0.33%
Swing	▼6.3%	▼1.0%	N/A
- Colours on map indicate winning party for each constituency.

The 2003 Kwun Tong District Council election was held on 23 November 2003 to elect all 34 elected members to the 42-member District Council.

== Overall election results ==
Before election:

↓
17	17
Pro-democracy	Pro-Beijing

Change in composition:

↓
20	14
Pro-democracy	Pro-Beijing

Kwun Tong District Council election result 2003
Party	Seats	Gains	Losses	Net gain/loss	Seats %	Votes %	Votes	+/−
Independent	24	5	5	0	64.7	70.6	71,552	
Democratic	9	2	0	+2	26.5	25.9	26,181	−6.3
DAB	4	1	3	−2	11.8	22.1	22,069	−1.0
Frontier	0	0	0	0	0	2.2	2,259	
Liberal	1	0	0	0	2.9	0.3	332	
