= Twin Tower =

Hong Kong residential block design

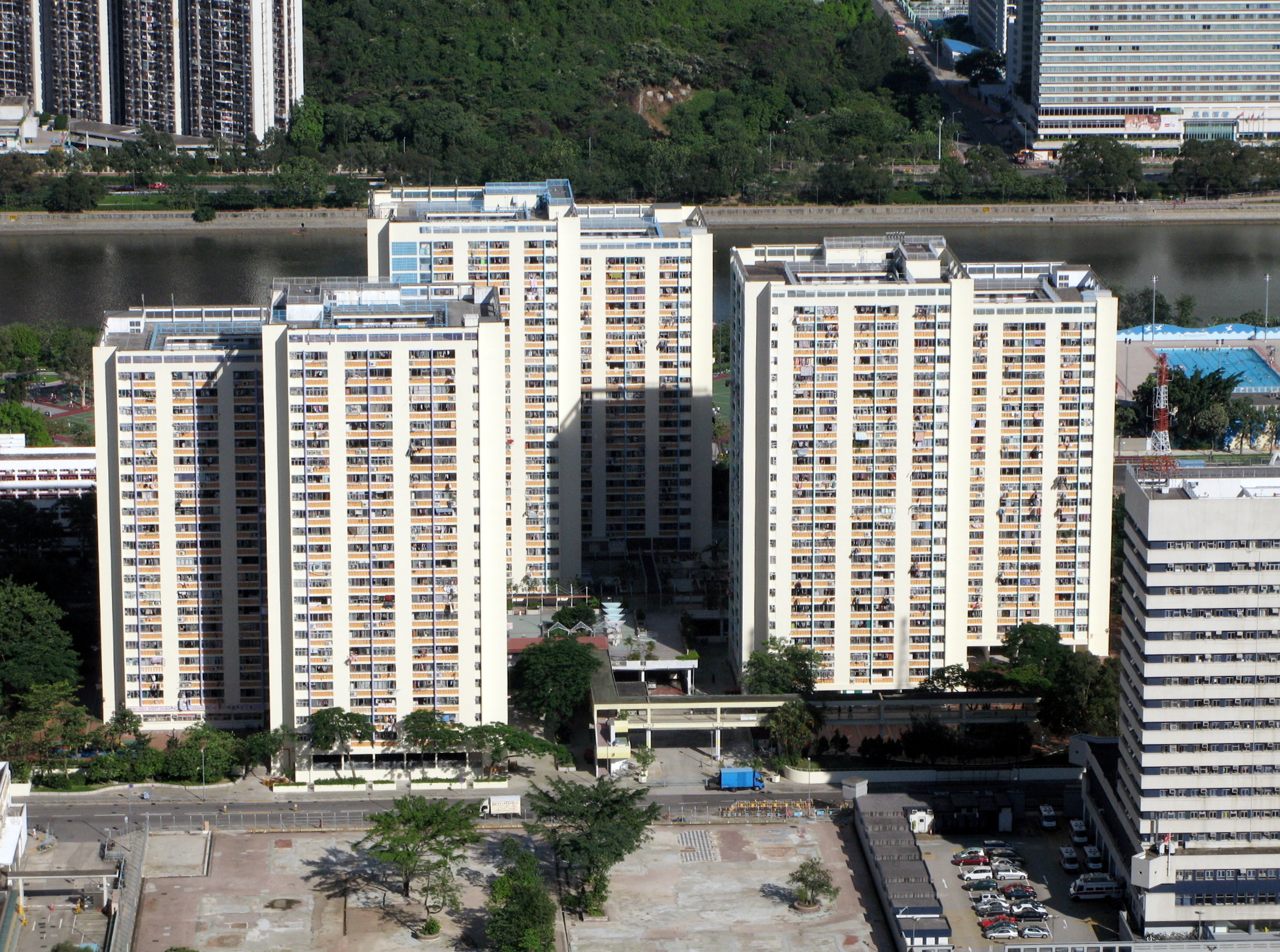
Twin Tower blocks at Wo Che Estate in Shatin New Town.

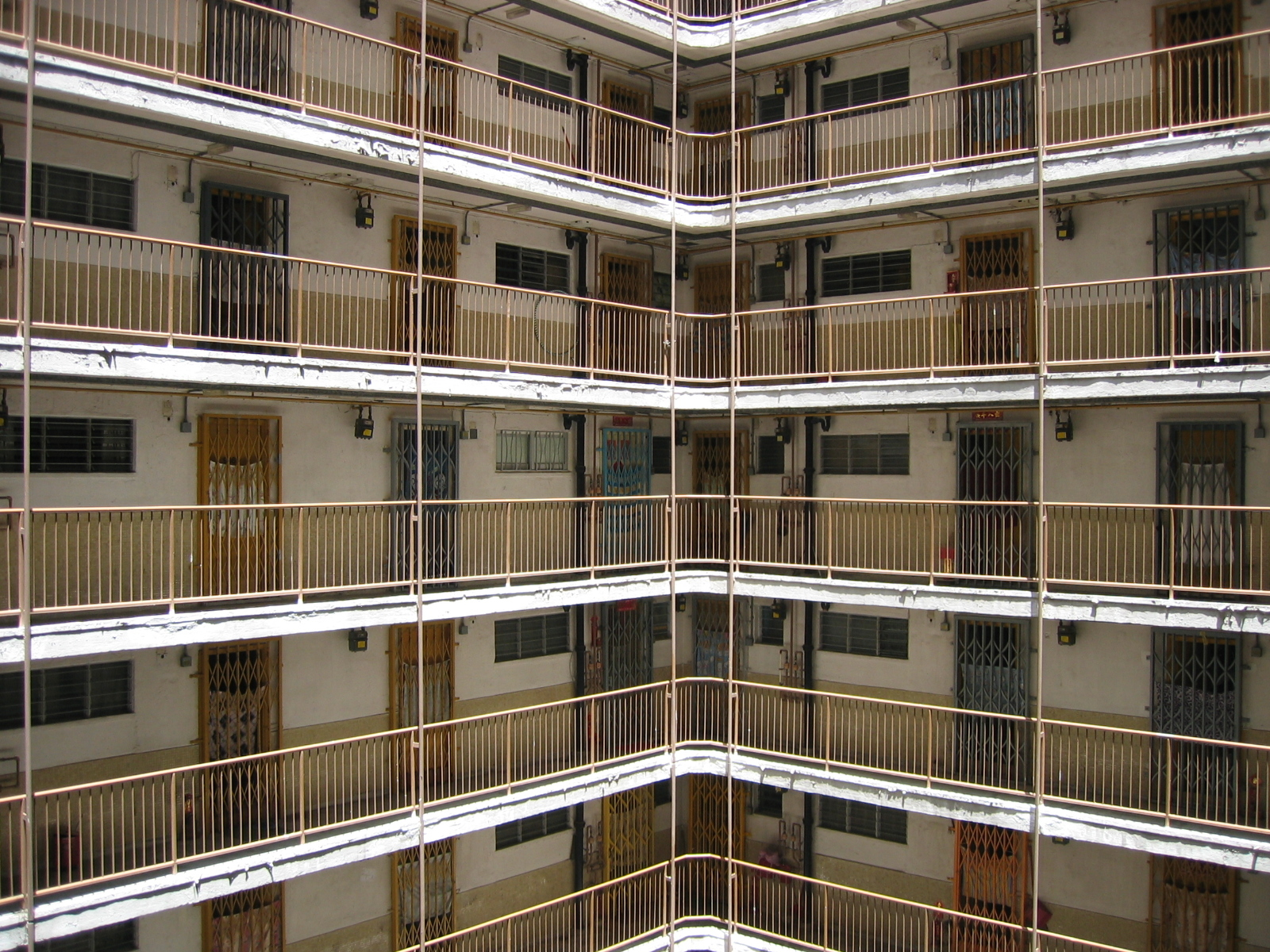
Void of a twin tower block of Sun Chui Estate.

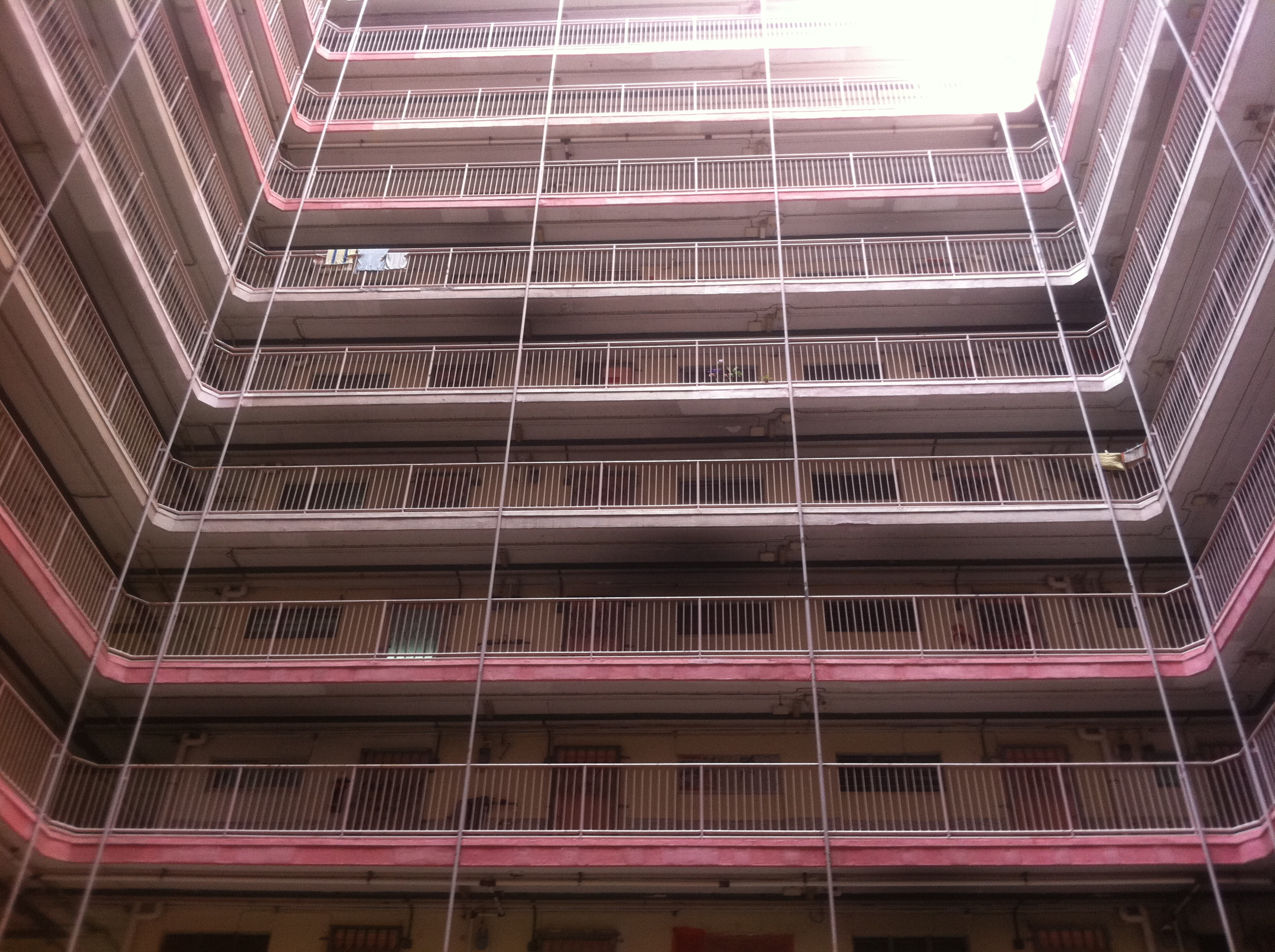
Void of a twin tower block of Wah Fu Estate.

Twin Tower (Chinese: 雙塔型) is a 1970s Hong Kong public housing residential block design. In plan, the blocks look like two hollow squares joined at one corner of each square. Each block comprises two "towers" of different heights, although their shapes are the same. The high tower ranges from 24 to 28 stories while the low tower is 21 stories. The size of a typical flat is 36 to 46 m^{2}. It cannot support more than 5 people in a typical flat.

The units in Twin Tower blocks are self-contained flats, each with a kitchen, toilet, and balcony.

The first Twin Tower blocks appeared at Wah Fu Estate. They were suited to the steeply sloping site, as one of the two "towers" within each block is offset by three storeys from the other, providing ground level entrances at multiple points along the slope. The two central atria in each block measure 50 by 50 feet. Reportedly, the square shape of the twin tower design provided the structural stability necessary to build more floors than the earlier, narrower slab blocks.

The Twin Tower blocks at Wah Fu make use of load-bearing partition walls which make construction faster through standardisation, obviate the need for interior columns within flats, and improve structural wind resistance.

After their introduction at Wah Fu Estate, the Twin Tower design appeared at Oi Man Estate and then many other public estates across Hong Kong in the 1970s.

== List of blocks ==
District	Name of estate	No. blocks	Year of completion
Southern	Wah Fu Estate	6	1970
Kowloon City	Oi Man Estate	5	1974
Wong Tai Sin	Choi Wan Estate	3	1978
Wong Tai Sin	Chuk Yuen (South) Estate	3	1983
Kwun Tong	Sau Mau Ping Estate	1	1984
Kwun Tong	Shun Lee Estate	3	1978
Kwun Tong	Shun Tin Estate	4	1982
Kwai Tsing	Cheung Ching Estate	6	1977
Kwai Tsing	Lai Yiu Estate	3	1976
Tsuen Wan	Cheung Shan Estate	2	1978
Tuen Mun	Wu King Estate	6	1982
Tuen Mun	Yau Oi Estate	3	1981
Tai Po	Kwong Fuk Estate	4	1983
Shatin	Lung Hang Estate	3	1983
Shatin	Sun Chui Estate	3	1984
Shatin	Wo Che Estate	6	1977
Total		61	
