= Shun Tin Estate =

Public housing estate in Shun Lee, Hong Kong

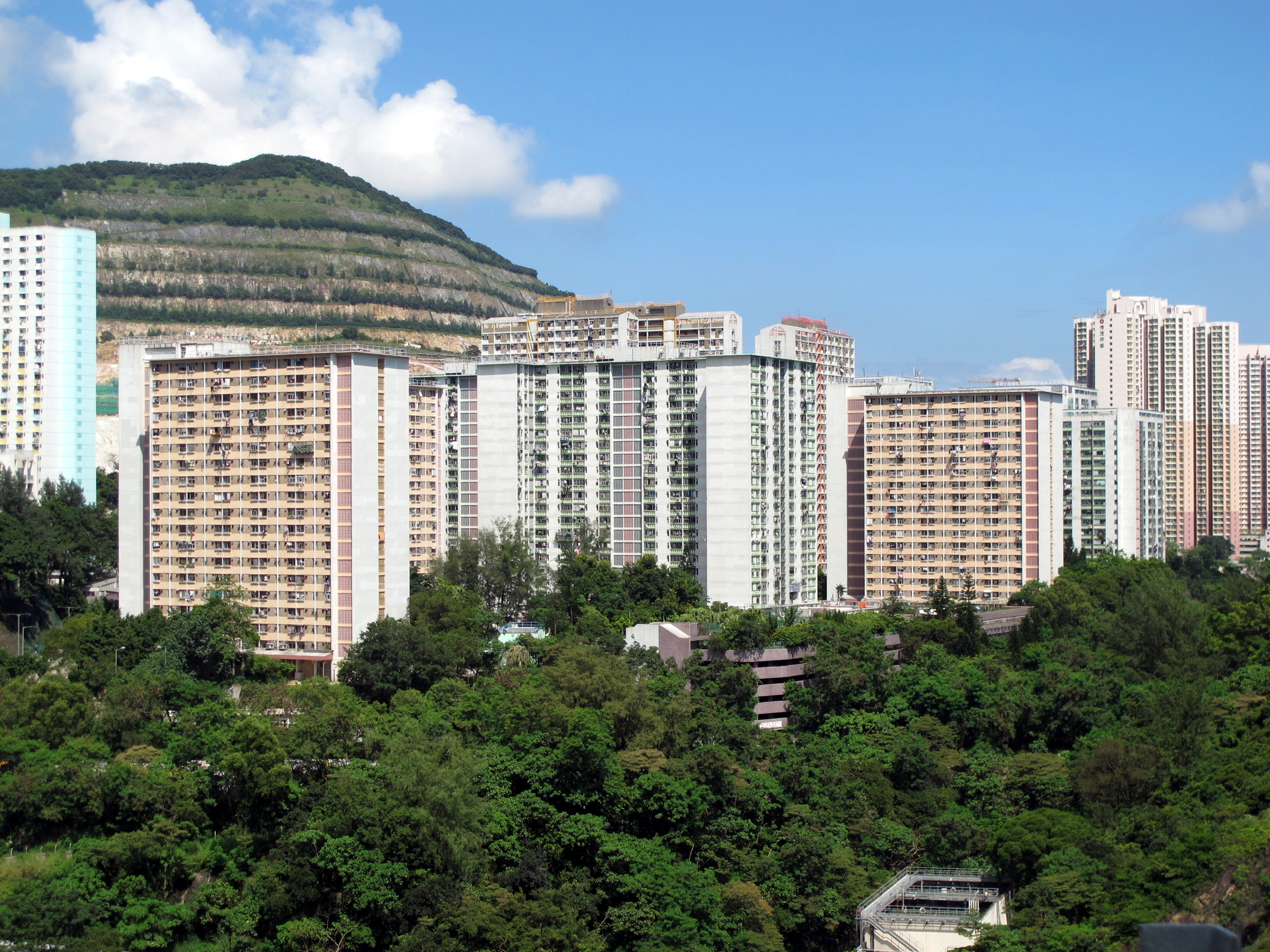
- Shun Tin Estate
- Interactive map of Shun Tin Estate

General information
- Location: 9 Shun On Road, Shun Lee; Kowloon, Hong Kong
- Coordinates: 22.3261°N 114.2262°E
- Status: Completed
- Category: Public rental housing
- Population: 18,118 (2016)
- No. of blocks: 11
- No. of units: 7,026

Construction
- Constructed: 1981; 45 years ago
- Authority: Hong Kong Housing Authority

Shun Tin Estate
- Traditional Chinese: 順天邨
- Simplified Chinese: 顺天邨
Transcriptions
Standard Mandarin
- Hanyu Pinyin: Shùn Tiān Cūn
Yue: Cantonese
- Jyutping: seon6 tin1 cyun1

Shun Tin Estate (Chinese: 順天邨) is a public housing estate in Shun Lee, Kowloon, Hong Kong. It comprises 11 residential blocks completed in 1981 to 1984 and 1989 respectively.

== History ==
The estate, reportedly the 105th built by the Housing Authority, began admitting tenants in late 1981. Some came from the old Lei Cheng Uk and Kun Tong estates, making way for redevelopments and improvements there.

On 21 July 1986, a HK$24.8 contract was awarded to construct a secondary school at Shun Tin Estate.

On 10 October 2015, a 58-year-old man was attacked after disputing with a 46-year-old man at Man Shun Restaurant in Tin Kuen House of Shun Tin Estate. He was rushed by an ambulance to United Christian Hospital in unconscious state and was later transferred to Queen Elizabeth Hospital for treatment. He was pronounced dead at 12.54pm on 16 January 2016. The police has classified the wounding case as manslaughter.

== Houses ==
Name	Chinese name	Building type	Completed
Tin Hang House	天衡樓	Old Slab	1981
Tin Kuen House	天權樓	Old Slab	1981
Tin Kei House	天璣樓	Double I	1981
Tin Yiu House	天瑤樓	Double I	1981
Tin Kam House	天琴樓	Twin Tower	1982
Tin Chu House	天柱樓	Twin Tower	1983
Tin Chi House	天池樓	Twin Tower	1983
Tin Wan House	天韻樓	Twin Tower	1984
Tin Fai House	天暉樓	Linear 1	1989
Tin Wing House	天榮樓	Linear 1	1989
Tin Lok House	天樂樓	Linear 1	1989

== Demographics ==
According to the 2016 by-census, Shun Tin Estate had a population of 18,118. The median age was 47.2 and the majority of residents (96.2 per cent) were of Chinese ethnicity. The average household size was 2.7 people. The median monthly household income of all households (i.e. including both economically active and inactive households) was HK$19,400.

== Politics ==
Shun Tin Estate is located in Shun Tin constituency of the Kwun Tong District Council. It is currently represented by Mok Kin-shing, who was elected in the 2019 elections.

== Education ==
Shun Tin Estate is in Primary One Admission (POA) School Net 46. Within the school net are multiple aided schools (operated independently but funded with government money); no government primary schools are in this net.

== See also ==
- Shun Lee
