= Shek Wai Kok (constituency) =

- Elected constituency for the Tsuen Wan District Council
- Boundary of Shek Wai Kok in Tsuen Wan District
- District: Tsuen Wan
- Legislative Council constituency: New Territories South West
- Population: 12,759 (2019)
- Electorate: 7,659 (2019)

Current constituency
- Created: 1994
- Number of members: One
- Member: Man Yu-ming (FPHE/NTAS)

Shek Wai Kok (Chinese: 石圍角) is one of the 19 constituencies in the Tsuen Wan District.

The constituency returns one district councillor to the Tsuen Wan District Council, with an election every four years.

Shek Wai Kok constituency has estimated population of 13,529.

== Councillors represented ==
Election	Member	Party
1994	Yeung Fuk-kwong	UFSP
2003	Man Yu-ming	Independent
2011	Man Yu-ming	NTAS/FPHE

== Election results ==
=== 2010s ===
Tsuen Wan District Council Election, 2019: Shek Wai Kok
Party	Candidate	Votes	%	±%
FPHE (NTAS)	Man Yu-ming	2,684	52.14	
Civic	Liu Ho-wan	2,464	47.86	
Majority		220	4.28	
Turnout		5,176	67.62	
FPHE hold		Swing		
