= 1999 Kwun Tong District Council election =

Hong Kong local election

- 28 November 1999

34 (of the 42) seats to Kwun Tong District Council 22 seats needed for a majority
- Turnout: 38.9%
	First party	Second party
Party	Democratic	DAB
Last election	7 seats, 27.1%	4 seats, 10.2%
Seats before	8	4
Seats won	9	6
Seat change	▲1	▲2
Popular vote	30,136	22,414
Percentage	32.2%	24.0%
Swing	▲5.2%	▲13.8%
- Colours on map indicate winning party for each constituency.

The 1999 Kwun Tong District Council election was held on 28 November 1999 to elect all 34 elected members to the 42-member District Council.

== Overall election results ==
Before election:

↓
18	15
Pro-democracy	Pro-Beijing

Change in composition:

↓
17	17
Pro-democracy	Pro-Beijing

Kwun Tong District Council election result 1999
Party	Seats	Gains	Losses	Net gain/loss	Seats %	Votes %	Votes	+/−
Independent	19	6	6	0	55.9	43.8	40,925	
Democratic	9	3	2	+1	26.5	32.2	30,136	+5.2
DAB	6	4	2	+2	17.6	24.0	22,414	+13.8
123DA	0	0	2	−2	0	0	0	
Liberal	0	0	1	−1	0	0	0	
