= 2007 Kwun Tong District Council election =

Hong Kong local election

- 18 November 2007

34 (of the 42) seats to Kwun Tong District Council 22 seats needed for a majority
- Turnout: 41.5%
	First party	Second party
Party	DAB	Democratic
Last election	4 seats, 22.0%	9 seats, 25.9%
Seats before	6	4
Seats won	9	3
Seat change	▲3	▼1
Popular vote	22,096	11,045
Percentage	22.1%	11.0%
Swing	▲0.1%	▼14.9%
- Colours on map indicate winning party for each constituency.

The 2007 Kwun Tong District Council election was held on 18 November 2007 to elect all 34 elected members to the 42-member District Council.

== Overall election results ==
Before election:

↓
17	1	16
Pro-democracy	I.	Pro-Beijing

Change in composition:

↓
8	1	25
Pro-democracy	I.	Pro-Beijing

Kwun Tong District Council election result 2007
Party	Seats	Gains	Losses	Net gain/loss	Seats %	Votes %	Votes	+/−
Independent	22	5	5	0	64.7	57.0	57,183	
DAB	9	3	0	+3	26.5	22.1	22,069	+0.1
Democratic	3	0	2	−1	8.8	11.0	11,045	−14.9
Civic	0	0	1	−1	0	5.9	5,960	
LSD	0	0	1	−1	0	3.3	3,349	
Liberal	0	0	0	0	0	0.6	554	
