= Hong Kong Army Cadets Association =

- 香港青少年軍總會
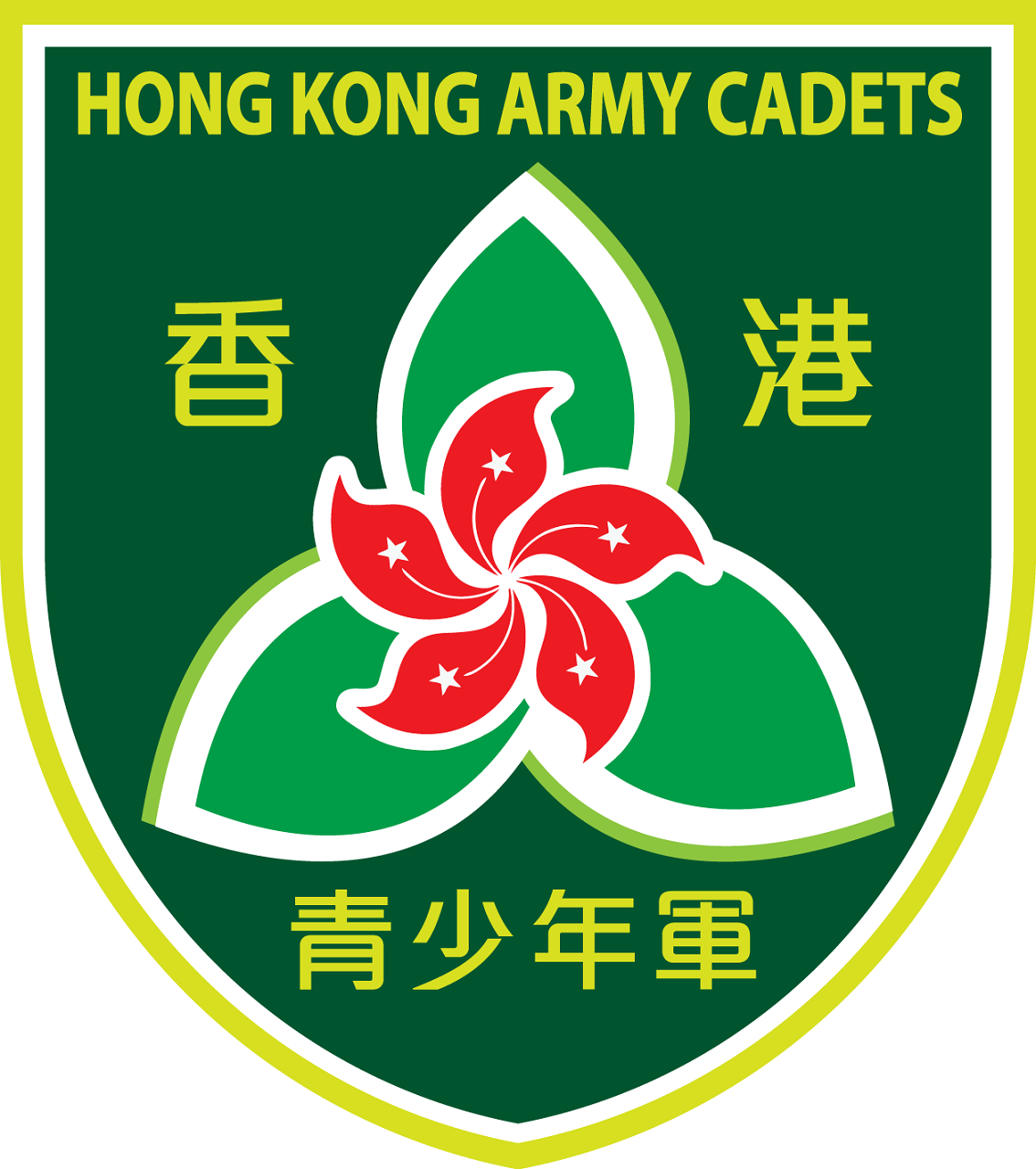
- Predecessor: Military Summer Camp For Hong Kong Youth
- Formation: January 15, 2015; 11 years ago
- Founded at: Ngong Shuen Chau Naval Base
- Type: Cadet
- Legal status: Limited Company
- Region served: Hong Kong
- Members: 2000
- Secretary General: Bunny Chan
- Commander in Chief: Regina Leung
- Affiliations: People's Liberation Army Hong Kong Garrison
- Website: hongkongarmycadets.org/tc/

The Hong Kong Army Cadets Association (Chinese: 香港青少年軍總會), established on 18 January 2015, is a Hong Kong Uniformed Youth Group (Chinese: 香港青少年制服團體), . Established with the aims "To contribute the city and serve the Fatherland". The Hong Kong Army Cadets Association is a development of the Military Summer Camp For Hong Kong Youth (Chinese: 香港青少年軍事夏令營) scheme organised by Betty Tung Chiu Hung-ping, the wife of former Chief Executive of Hong Kong Tung Chee-hwa, and the core of the estimated 2000 strong membership is made up of attendees of the summer camps; the target membership of the Association is children and youths from the age of six upwards. Up until 2023.

== Organisation ==
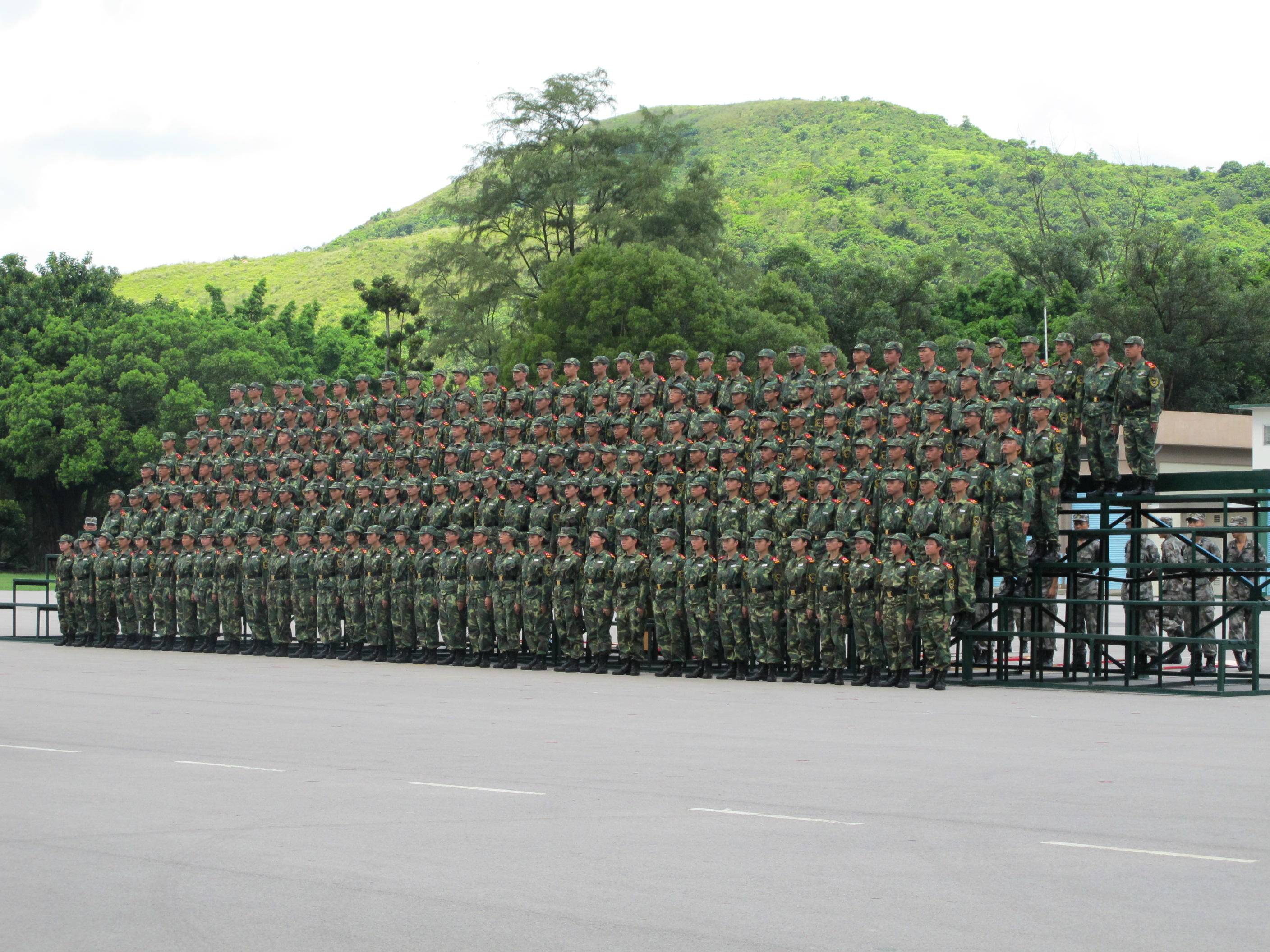
Attendees of the sixth military summer camp program, attendees of the camps form the core membership of the Association.

The Chairman of the Hong Kong Army Cadets Association Limited is Tai Tak Fung (Chinese: 戴德豐) of the Four Seas Group. Founders and patrons of the Association include Chief Executive of Hong Kong Leung Chun-ying, director of the Liaison Office of the Central People's Government in the Hong Kong Zhang Xiaoming and Commander of the People's Liberation Army Hong Kong Garrison Tan Benhong. The board, chaired by National People's Congress for Hong Kong Bunny Chan (Chinese: 陳振彬), is composed of PRC officials in Hong Kong and members of the Pro-Beijing camp, Commander in Chief of the corps is Regina Leung the wife of Leung Chun-ying.

The Association shares a similar name to the pre-existing Hong Kong Army Cadets, the Hong Kong Army Cadets is not a recognised uniformed group by the Hong Kong Government, is not a registered company but is registered under the SAR's societies legislation. Unlike the Association the Hong Kong Army Cadets use British Army based drill, uniforms, structure and firearms.

== History ==
The Association builds on the work of the Military Summer Camp For Hong Kong Youth (Chinese: 香港青少年軍事夏令營) scheme headed by Betty Tung Chiu Hung-ping, the wife of former Chief Executive Tung Chee-hwa. The summer camp program began in 2005 running for two weeks every July. Aimed at secondary school students from the third to sixth years (ages 14 to 17) the summer camps featured a program of leadership training, military drill, Junshi Sanda and an education program to further understanding of the PRC and PLA.

The Association was registered as a limited company with the Companies Registry (CR) on January 15, 2015. In the same month on the 18th, the Association held an establishment ceremony at Ngong Shuen Chau Naval Base, in attendance were representatives from a number of Hong Kong youth organisations, including the Scout Association of Hong Kong, Hong Kong Girl Guides Association, Hong Kong Air Cadet Corps, and the Boys' Brigade, Hong Kong amongst others. Attendees on the part of the government included Secretary for Security, Mr Lai Tung-kwok, and the Secretary for Education Eddie Ng; however of the media bodies present, only three were allowed to conduct interviews, with the mainland-controlled Wen Wei Po being shown special favour.

== Reception ==
Legislative councillor Regina Ip of the pro-Beijing political party New People's Party said of the establishment of the Association that it "allows the young people of Hong Kong greater training opportunities, to broaden their outlook, to encounter different things and situations, and allows them to know and understand how the People's Liberation Army works." while Legislative councillor Priscilla Leung of the pro-Beijing political party Business and Professionals Alliance for Hong Kong said "This official move, encourages the youth to engage with the mainland, and cultivates their sense of belonging and duty, this is both normal and reasonable."

== Controversies ==
In November 2016, the Association was granted the lease of a disused school in Kowloon over two other long established groups the Boys' Brigade, Hong Kong and the Hong Kong Adventure Corps both with many more members than the Association. Although the process was described as transparent and fair by the government, the move was seen as an example of favouritism by others; especially since the Association's finances was seen as being one of the factors in which it was superior, however a large part of the Associations finances derive from expedited grants from the SAR government.

== See also ==
- Pioneer movement
- Cadets (youth program)
