= Positive Synergy =

Hong Kong Pro-Beijing political party

Positive Synergy 創建力量
- Abbreviation: PS
- Chairperson: Bunny Chan
- Vice-Chairpersons: Yiu Pak-leung
- Founded: 1 July 2013
- Ideology: Conservatism (HK)
- Regional affiliation: Pro-Beijing
- Colors: Pink
- Legislative Council: 1 / 90
- District Council: 10 / 470

Website
- facebook.com/positivesynergy2013

Positive Synergy（Chinese: 創建力量）Is a Hong Kong Pro-Beijing political party founded on 1 July 2013 and chaired by Bunny Chan. Its members are concentrated around the East Kowloon area. Yiu Pak-leung is the current Positive Synergy representative in the Legislative Council.

== History ==
Positive Synergy was founded on 1 July 2013 by over 30 District Councilors as a platform for Pro-Beijing lawmakers who focus on local livelihood issues and aim to urge the government to speed up construction and development of the Kai Tak Development Plan and East Kowloon Cultural Centre.

== Electoral history ==
=== Legislative Council elections ===
Election	Number of popular votes	% of popular votes	GC seats	FC seats	EC seats	Total	+/-
2012	38,546▲	2.13▲	1	0		1 / 70	1▲
2016	47,527▲	2.16▲	1	0		1 / 70	0
2021			0	1	1	2 / 90	1▲
2025			0	0	1	1 / 90	1▼

=== District Council elections ===
Election	Number of popular votes	% of popular votes	Elected Seats	Ex-Officio Seat	Total	+/-
2015	46,480	3.22%	22	0	22 / 458	▲22
2019	14,151	1.72%	6	0	6 / 479	▼16
