= Kwun Tong Residents Association =

The Kwun Tong Residents Association (Chinese: 觀塘民眾聯誼會, KTRA) is a long established Kaifong association rooted in Kwun Tong.

It was established in 1974 and gained its status as non-profit organisation in 1999. It was seen as a traditional pro-PRC leftist group. The chairmen of the association include Chan Kam-lam of the pro-Beijing party Democratic Alliance for the Betterment and Progress of Hong Kong (DAB), the chairman of the Kwun Tong District Council Bunny Chan and the Kwung Tong District Councillor as well as the former official of the Liaison Office of central government Wong Chun-ping.

The association has been actively participated in the elections of Legislative Council and District Councils, including Hau Shui-pui in the 1991 election, and provides good support to the DAB candidates in elections.
