= Shun Lee =

Area in Hong Kong

- Traditional Chinese: 順利
- Simplified Chinese: 顺利
Transcriptions
Standard Mandarin
- Hanyu Pinyin: Shùnlì
Yue: Cantonese
- Jyutping: seon6 lei6

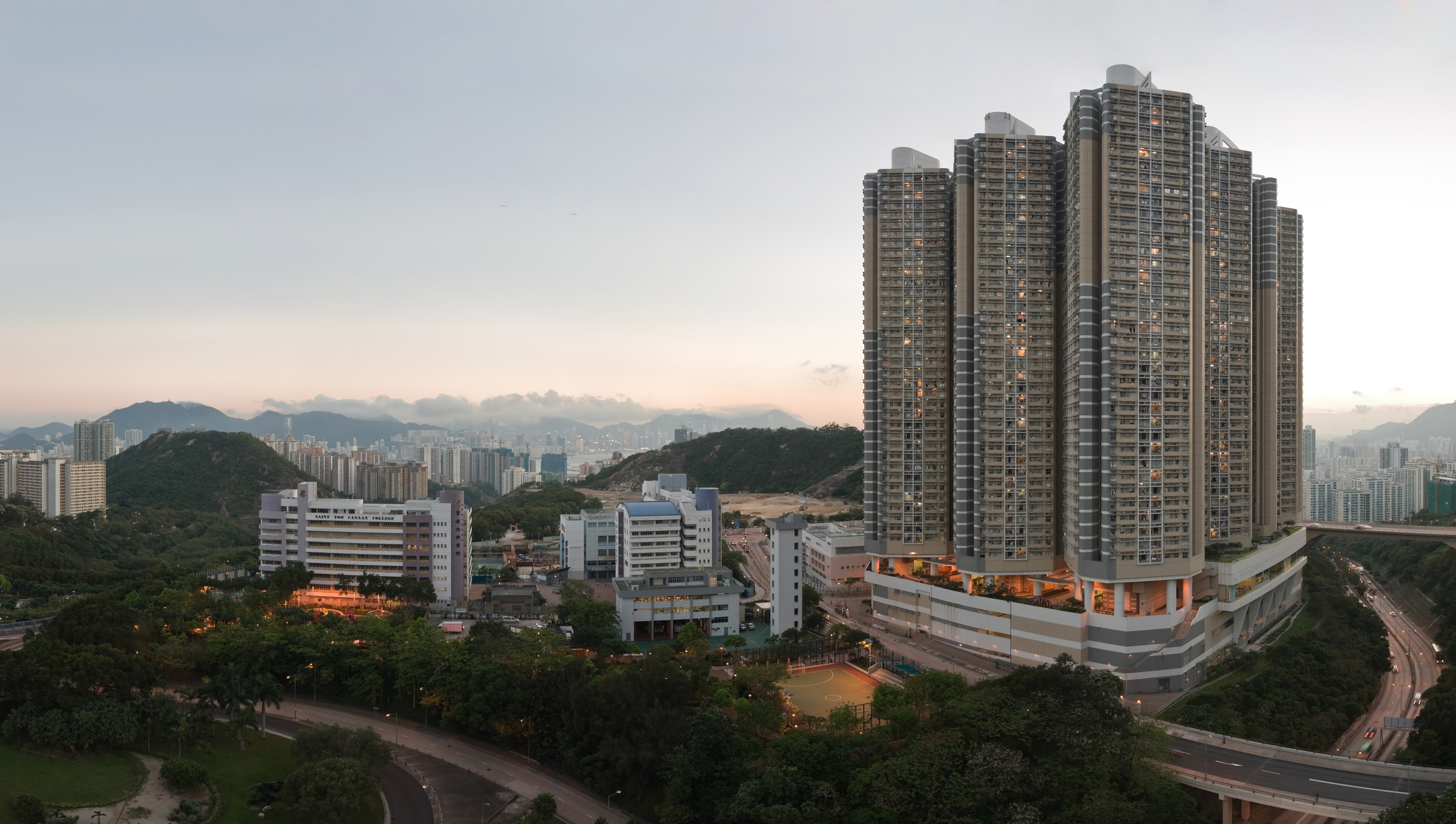
Southern part of Shun Lee

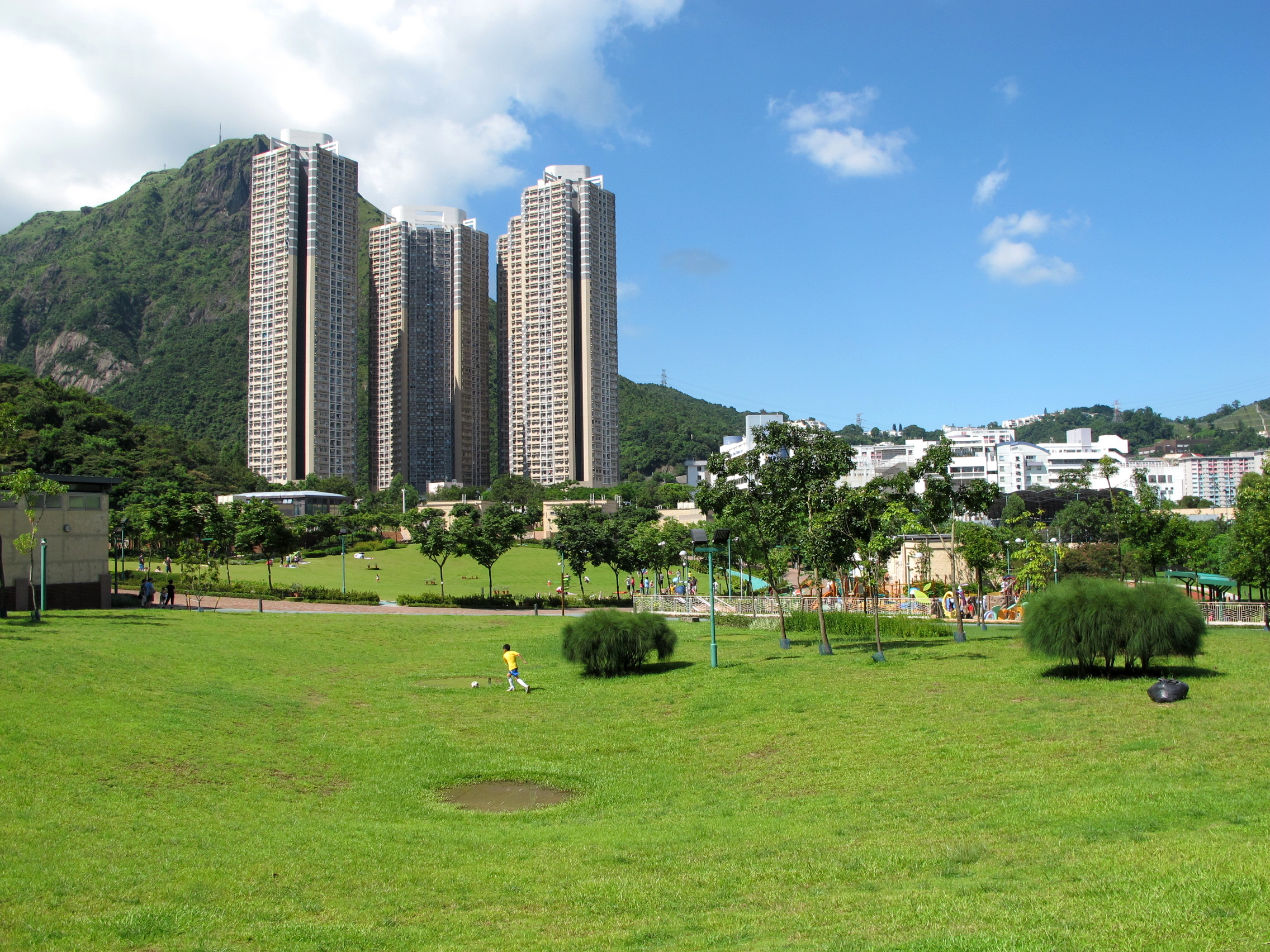
Jordan Valley Park

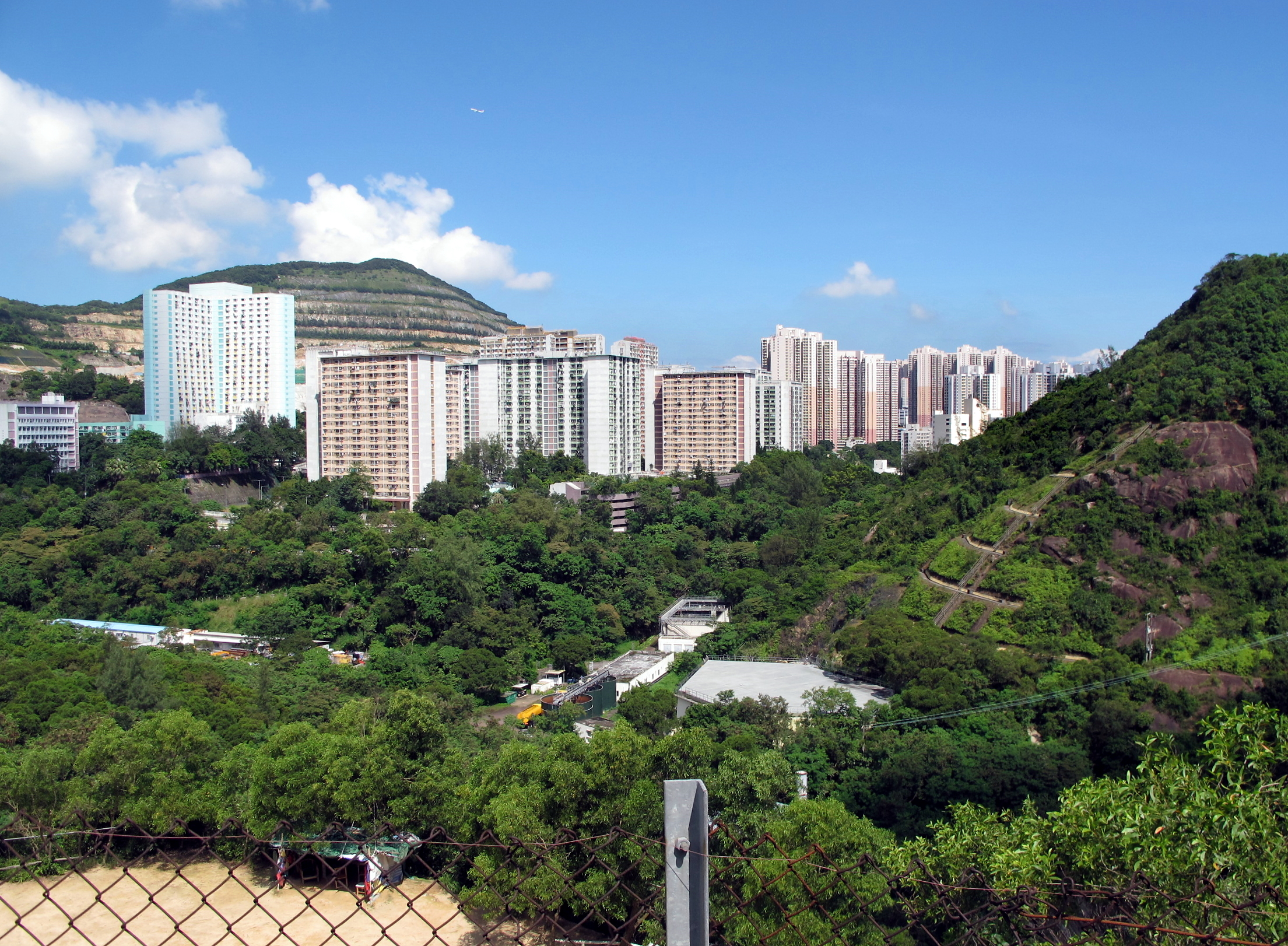
Shun Lee Estate and Shun Tin Estate

Shun Lee (Chinese: 順利) is an area north of Sau Mau Ping and east of Ngau Chi Wan in Hong Kong. The area was originally known as Rennie's Farm. It is later named after the first public housing estate in the area, Shun Lee Estate. It is also known as Sze Shun (四順, i.e. Four Shun) as there are four estates with name starting with Shun in 2006.

Before any urban development, the rural area belonged to the rural district of Ngau Chi Wan. Later, it was also once considered an extension of Ngau Tau Kok. After the establishment of District Boards of Hong Kong, the area is administratively under Kwun Tong District.

== Geography ==
The area is a valley surrounded by hills. A main river flowed from Custom Hill and joined another river from Kowloon Peak and emptied into Kowloon Bay via Jordan Valley.

== Public housing ==
The public housing estates and Home Ownership Scheme in Sze Shun includes Shun Lee Estate, Shun On Estate, Shun Chi Court and Shun Tin Estate.

Name		Type	Inaug.	No Blocks	No Units	Notes
Shun Lee Estate	順利邨	Public	1978	7	4,461	
Shun On Estate	順安邨	Public	1978	3	3,002	
Shun Chi Court	順緻苑	HOS	1980	6	1,539	
Shun Tin Estate	順天邨	Public	1981	11	7,026	

== Shun Lee Estate ==
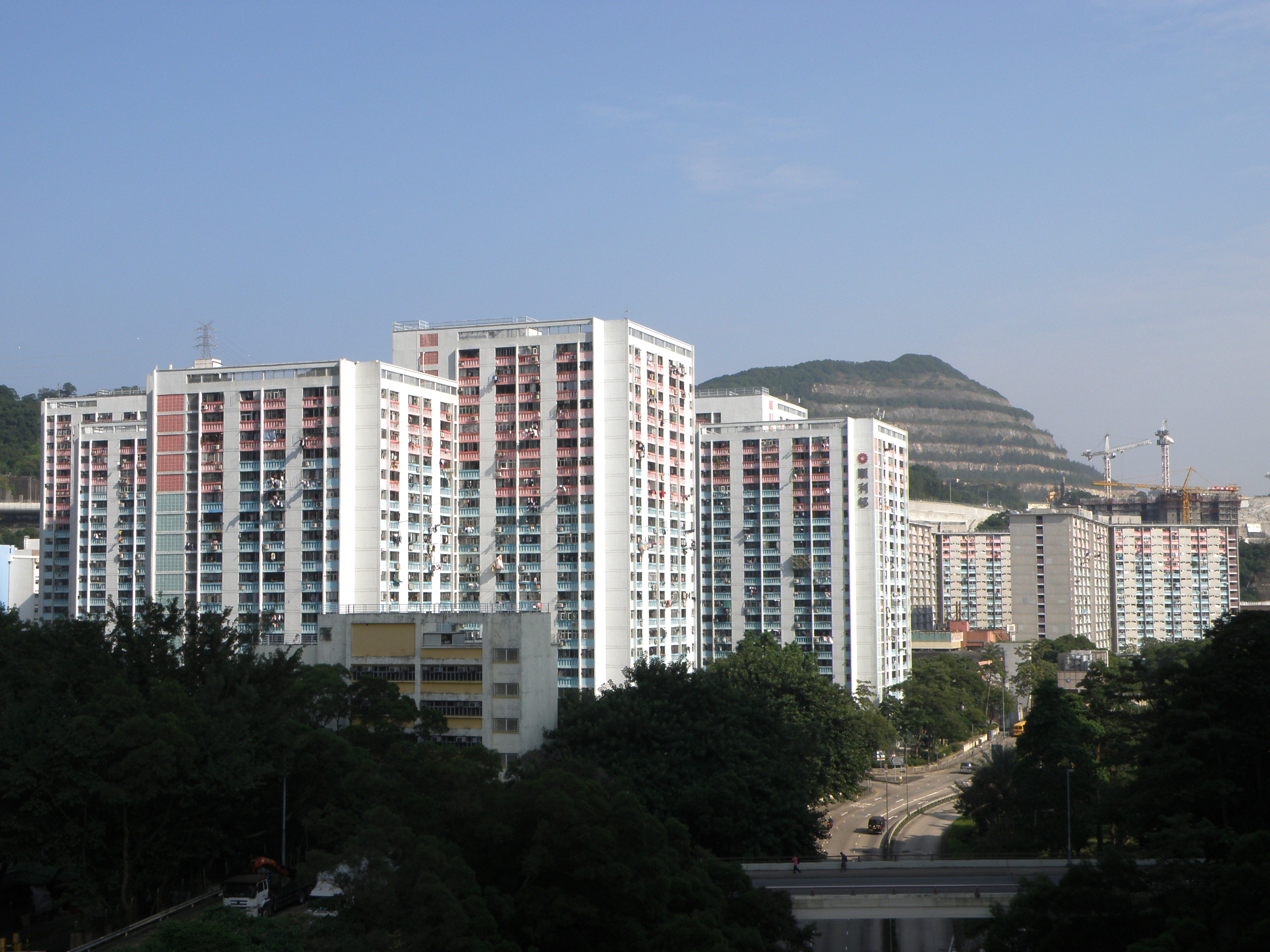
Twin Tower blocks in Shun Lee Estate

Shun Lee Estate (Chinese: 順利邨) is the earliest public housing estate in Sze Shun area. It has totally 7 residential blocks built in 1978 and 1980 respectively.

Hong Kong Public Libraries maintains the Shun Lee Estate Public Library in the Shun Lee Tsuen Sports Centre.

=== Houses ===
Name	Type	Completion
Lee Cheung House	Twin Tower	1978
Lee Hang House	Twin Tower	1978
Lee Ming House	Twin Tower	1978
Lee Yip House	Old Slab	1980
Lee Yat House	Old Slab	1980
Lee Foo House	Old Slab	1980
Lee Hong House	Old Slab	1980

Shun Lee Estate is in Primary One Admission (POA) School Net 46. Within the school net are multiple aided schools (operated independently but funded with government money); no government primary schools are in this net.

== Shun On Estate ==
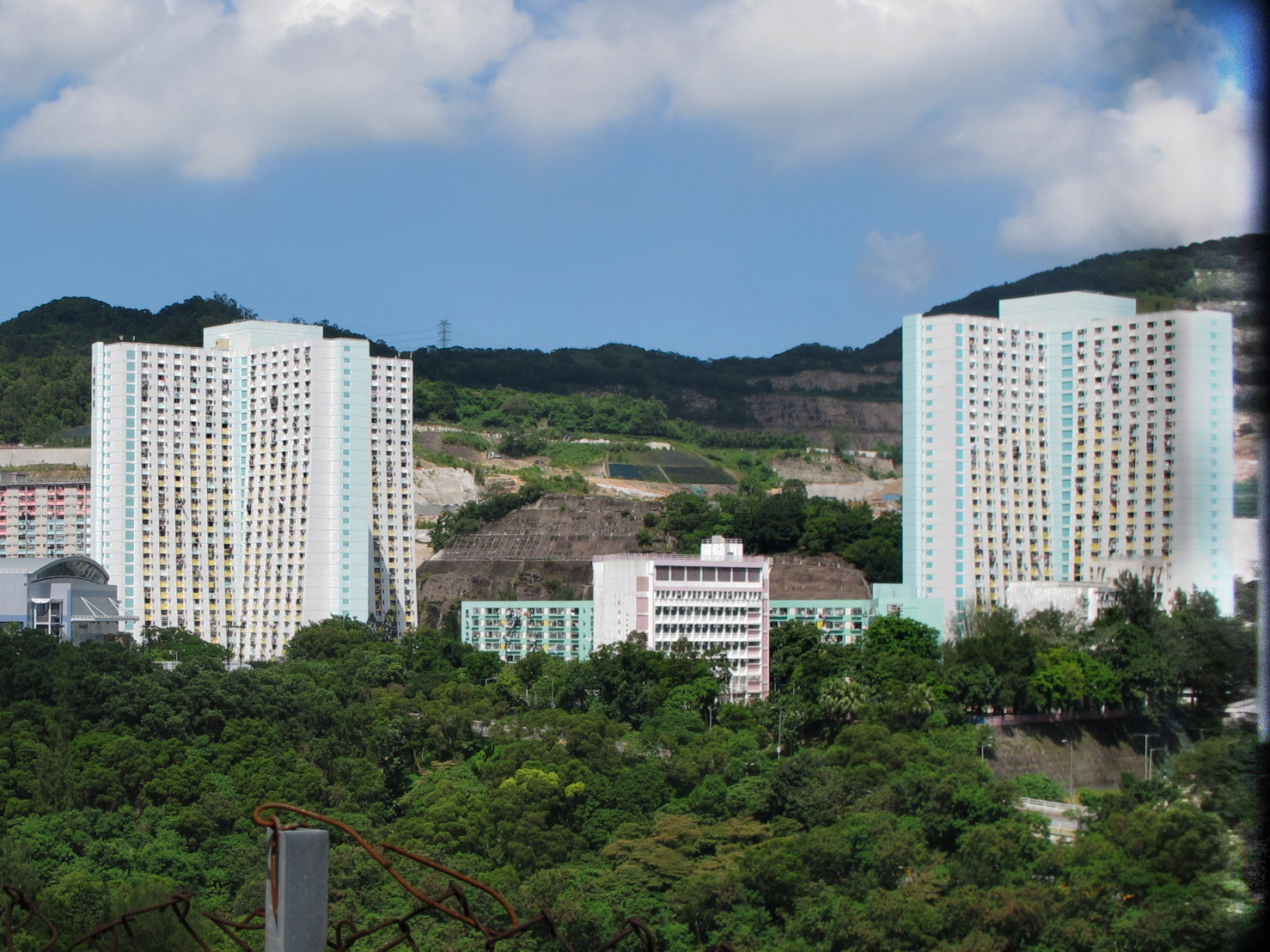
Cruciform and Old Slab blocks in Shun On Estate

Shun On Estate (Chinese: 順安邨) has 3 residential blocks built in 1978.

=== Houses ===
Name	Type	Completion
On Chung House	Cruciform	1978
On Yat House	Cruciform	1978
On Kwan House	Old Slab	1980

Shun On Estate is in Primary One Admission (POA) School Net 46. Within the school net are multiple aided schools (operated independently but funded with government money); no government primary schools are in this net.

== Shun Chi Court ==
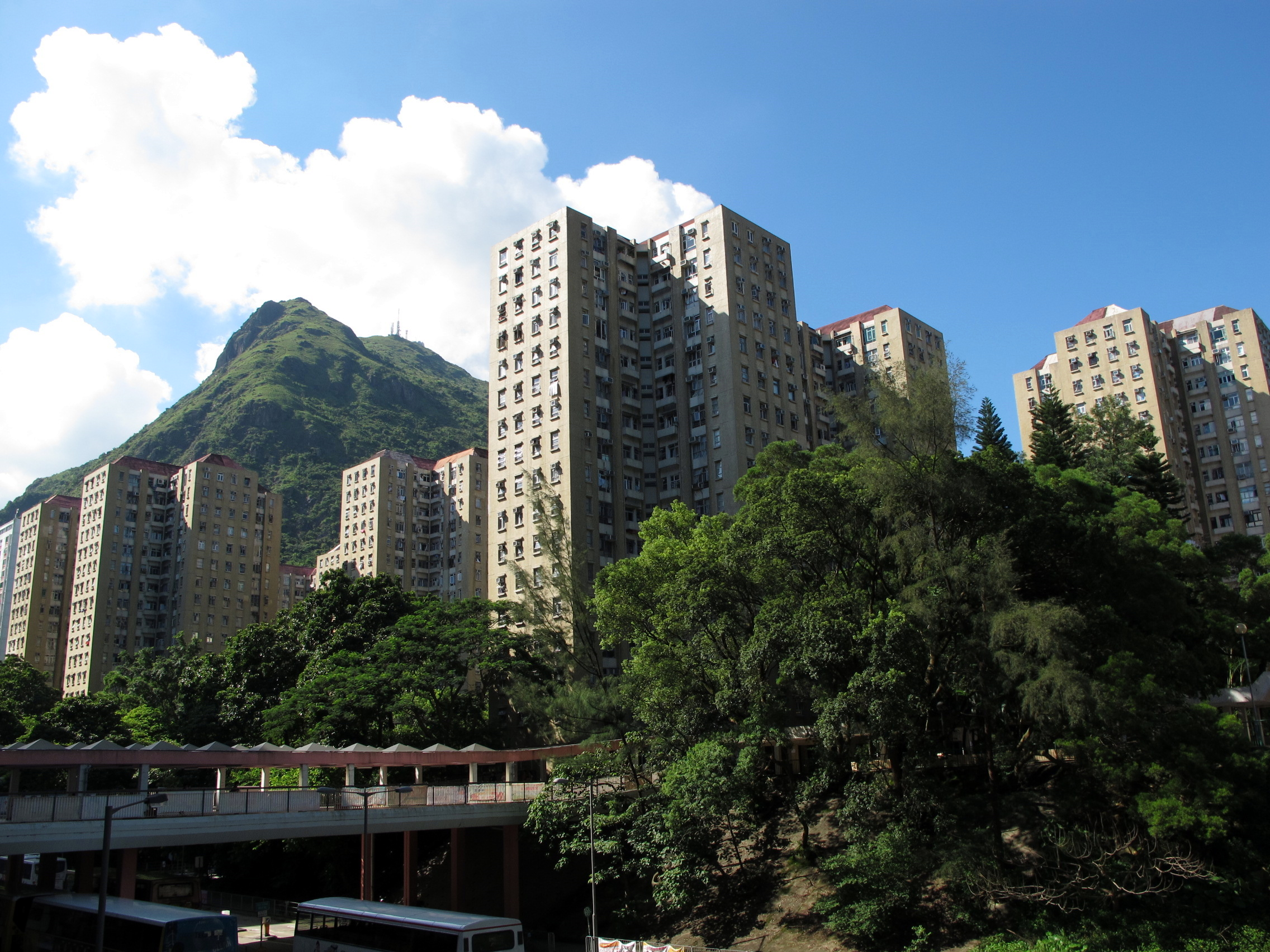
Shun Chi Court

Shun Chi Court (Chinese: 順緻苑) is one of the first Home Ownership Scheme estates in Hong Kong. It consists of 6 residential blocks built in 1980.

=== Houses ===
Name	Type	Completion
Shun Fung/Lung House (Block A)	Non-standard	1980
Shun Cheung/Wing House (Block B)	Non-standard	1980
Shun Ying/Fai House (Block C)	Non-standard	1980
Shun Wah/Mei House (Block D)	Non-standard	1980
Shun Tai/Shing House (Block E)	Non-standard	1980
Shun Hong/Ning House (Block F)	Non-standard	1980

Shun Chi Court is in Primary One Admission (POA) School Net 46. Within the school net are multiple aided schools (operated independently but funded with government money); no government primary schools are in this net.

== Shun Tin Estate ==
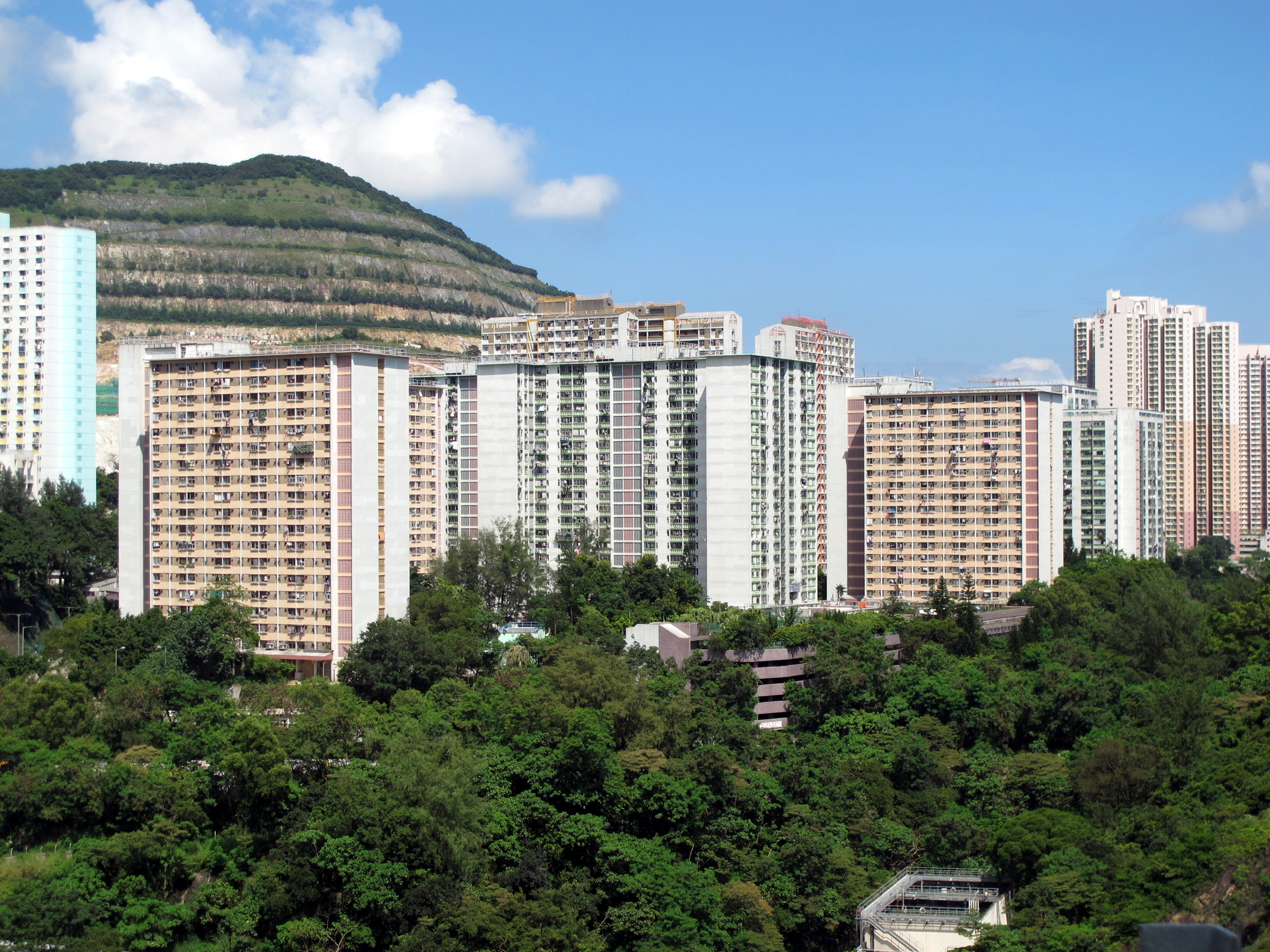
Shun Tin Estate

Shun Tin Estate (Chinese: 順天邨) has 11 residential blocks built in 1981, 1983 and 1989 respectively.

=== Houses ===
Name	Type	Completion
Tin Hang House	Old Slab	1981
Tin Kuen House	Old Slab	1981
Tin Kei House	Linear 1	1981
Tin Yiu House	Linear 1	1981
Tin Kam House	Twin Tower	1982
Tin Chu House	Twin Tower	1983
Tin Chi House	Twin Tower	1983
Tin Wan House	Twin Tower	1984
Tin Fai House	Double I	1989
Tin Wing House	Double I	1989
Tin Lok House	Double I	1989
