= Bunny Chan =

Hong Kong businessman and politician

The Honourable Bunny Chan Chun-bun GBM, GBS, JP
- 陳振彬
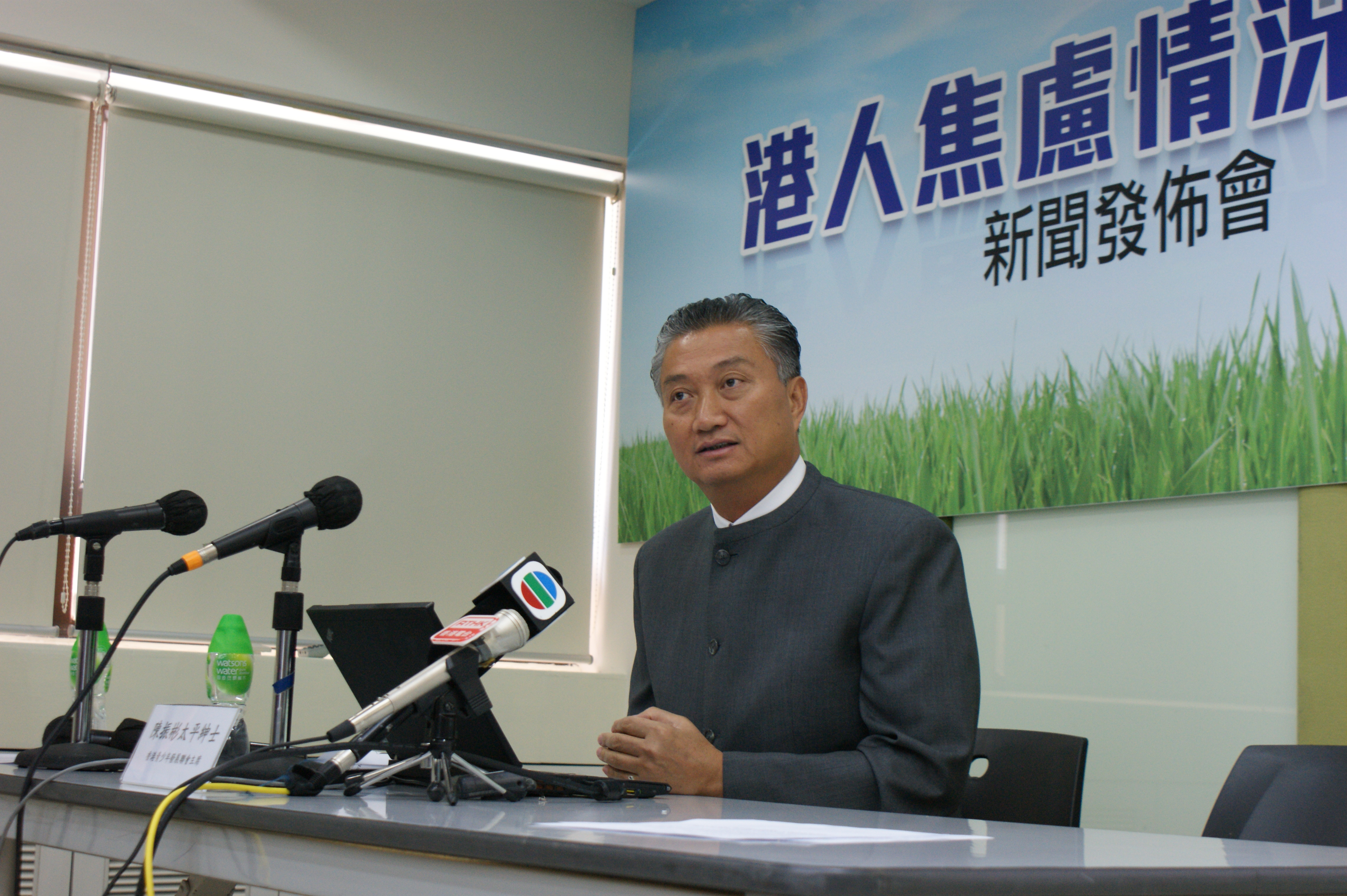

Chairman of the Kwun Tong District Council
- In office 6 January 2004 – 30 December 2019
- Preceded by: Hau Shui-pui
- Succeeded by: Choy Chak-hung

Member of the Kwun Tong District Council
- In office 1 January 2012 – 31 December 2019
- Preceded by: Leung Fu-wing
- Succeeded by: Li Ka-tat
- Constituency: Hip Hong
- In office 1 January 2000 – 31 December 2011
- Constituency: Appointed

Personal details
- Born: 1957 (age 68–69)
- Party: Positive Synergy (since 2013)

Bunny Chan Chung-bun GBM GBS JP (Chinese: 陳振彬; born 1957) is a Hong Kong businessman and politician. He is the former chairman of the Kwun Tong District Council, a Hong Kong deputy to the National People's Congress of China and the chairman of the Hong Kong Army Cadets Association.

== Early life and education ==
Bunny Chan was born in Hong Kong in 1957 with his family originating from Chaozhou. He attended Iu Shan School in Kowloon City and graduated from secondary school in 1976.

== Career ==
After graduating from secondary school, he worked at To Kwa Wan’s Kai Ngai Embroidery Factory as a clerk and a sewing trainee and learnt procedures such as blinding and button holing form working at his friends' and foreman's workshops.

In 1979, he opened a factory with a capital of 2000 dollars and rented a site in Mei King Mansion for manufacturing travel bags and other gifts, a predecessor of Prospectful Garment Factory. In 1983, he switched to producing children's clothes and set up Prospectful Holdings Ltd. and became its chairman which outsource its production processes and expanded in scale. He moved the factory to Kwun Tong in 1985 and later bought out the site.

He was first appointed to the Kwun Tong District Council in 2000, and then elected chairman of the council from 2004. He first contested in the 2011 District Council election and won a seat in Hip Hong, which he lost his seat in 2019 following a rout of pro-Beijing candidates amidst the 2019–20 Hong Kong protests. Chan was appointed council member of the Open University of Hong Kong from 2006 to 2012 in which he was conferred Doctor of Business Administration, honoris causa, by the university in 2013. He is also a vice-chairperson of the Community Care Fund Task Force of the Commission on Poverty from 2012. He is a member of the Council for Sustainable Development from 2015. In 2012 he was elected to the National People's Congress by the electoral college as a Hong Kong deputy.

Chan was appointed to the Commission on Youth in 2004 and was chairman from 2009 to 2015. He is also the founding chairman of the Hong Kong Army Cadets Association which was established in 2015. The mission of the Association is said to enhance youths’ attributes of self-enhancement, self-discipline, self-confidence, sense of responsibility, leadership and volunteerism. However the association sparked controversy over its "secretive" inauguration ceremony held in the restricted area of the People’s Liberation Army navy base on Stonecutters Island with the few members of the media invited all having close ties to Beijing. The association was blasted as pro-Beijing indoctrination.

Chan was appointed Justice of the Peace in 2002 and was awarded the Bronze Bauhinia Star medal in 2004, Silver Bauhinia Star medal in 2009 and Gold Bauhinia Star medal in 2014. He was awarded the Grand Bauhinia Medal in 2021.

Political offices
Preceded by Hau Shui-pui	Chairman of Kwun Tong District Council; 2004–2019	Succeeded by Choy Chak-hung
Preceded by Leung Fu-wing	Member of Kwun Tong District Council; Representative for Hip Hong; 2012–2019	Succeeded by Li Ka-tat
