= Federation of Public Housing Estates =

Hong Kong political organisation

Federation of Public Housing Estates 公屋聯會
- President: Wong Kwan
- Chairman: Man Yu-ming
- Founded: 19 April 1985
- Ideology: Chinese nationalism Conservatism (HK)
- National affiliation: Pro-Beijing camp
- Colours: Brown
- Legislative Council: 0 / 90
- District Councils: 3 / 470

Website
- www.hkph.org

Federation of Public Housing Estates
- Traditional Chinese: 公屋聯會
- Literal meaning: Public Housing Association
Transcriptions
Yue: Cantonese
- Yale Romanization: Gūng ngūk lyùhn wuih
- Jyutping: Gung^{1} uk^{1} lyun^{4} wui^{6*2}

Alternative Chinese name
- Traditional Chinese: 港九新界公共屋居民商戶團體聯會
- Literal meaning: Hong Kong, Kowloon and New Territories Public Housing Residents and Merchants Association
Transcriptions
Yue: Cantonese
- Yale Romanization: Góng gáu sān gaai gūng guhng ngūk gēui màhn sēung wuh tyùhn tái lyùhn wuih
- Jyutping: gong^{2} gau^{2} san^{1} gaai^{3} gung^{1} gung^{6} uk^{1} geoi^{1} man^{4} soeng^{1} wu^{6} tyun^{4} tai^{2} lyun^{4} wui^{6*2}

The Federation of Public Housing Estates (Chinese: 公屋聯會) is a pro-Beijing organisation formed in 1985 by 11 community associations. It focuses on public housing policies and caters to the interests of the residents of the public housing estates.

== Leadership ==
=== Presidents ===
- Hau Shui-pui
- Wong Kwan

=== Chairmen ===
- Lam Yuk-tong
- Hau Shui-pui
- Wong Kwan
- Man Yu-ming

== Performance in elections ==
=== District Council elections ===
Election	Number of popular votes	% of popular votes	Total elected seats	+/−
2015	3,457	0.24	1 / 431	1▲
2019	19,495▲	0.66▲	3 / 452	1▲
2023	17,744▼	1.52▲	3 / 470	Steady

== Representatives ==
=== District Councils ===
The FPHE has won three seats in two District Councils (2020–2023):

District	Constituency	Member
Kwun Tong	Kwun Tong On Tai	Lam Wai
Kwun Tong	Yau Chui	Pang Chi-sang
Tsuen Wan	Shek Wai Kok	Man Yu-ming

== See also ==
- United Front Work Department
- United Front (China)
