= Old Slab =

Old Slab (Chinese: 舊長型) is a design of residential blocks used in Hong Kong public housing estates. The buildings of this type consist of one or more elongated rectangular blocks, joining end by end. As of 2018 there were 257 of these structures in the city.

== Gallery ==
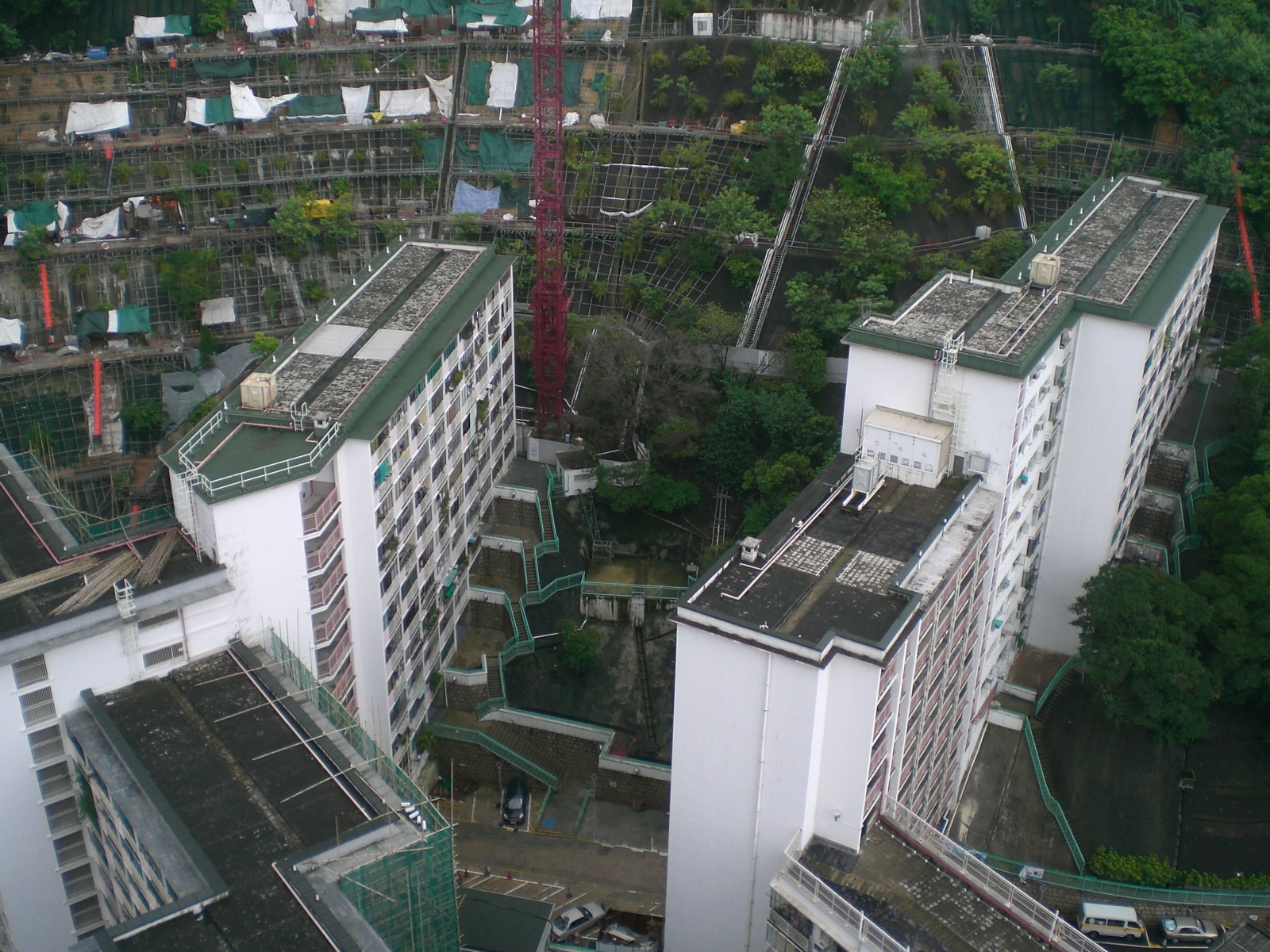
Sai Wan Estate

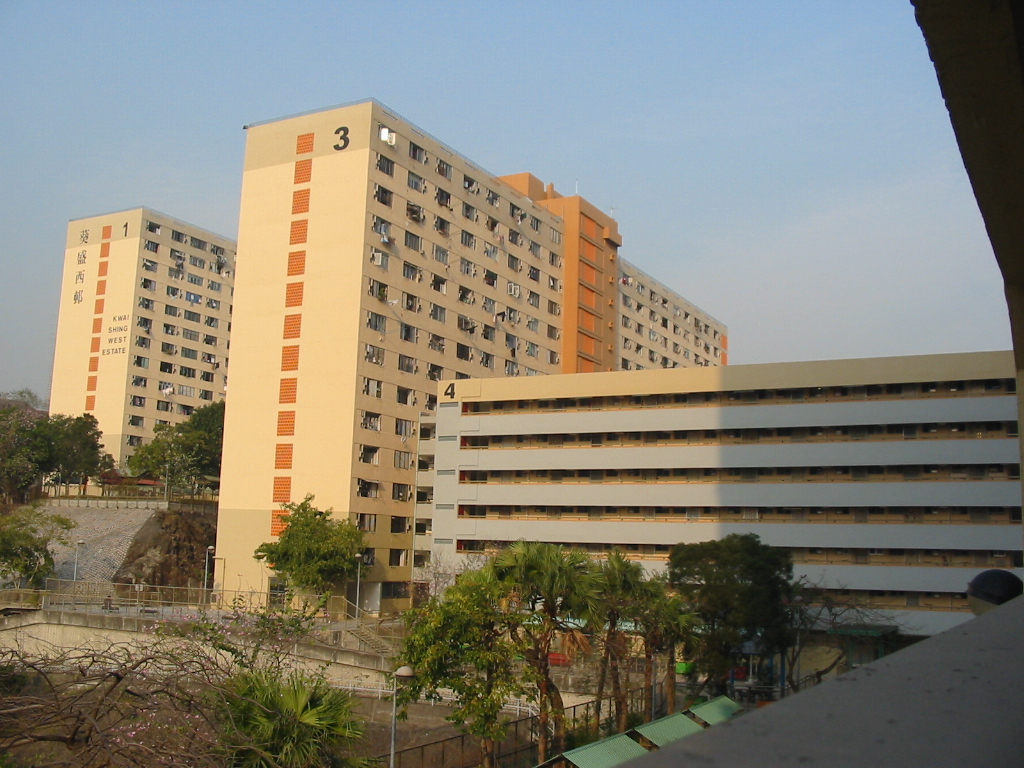
Kwai Shing West Estate

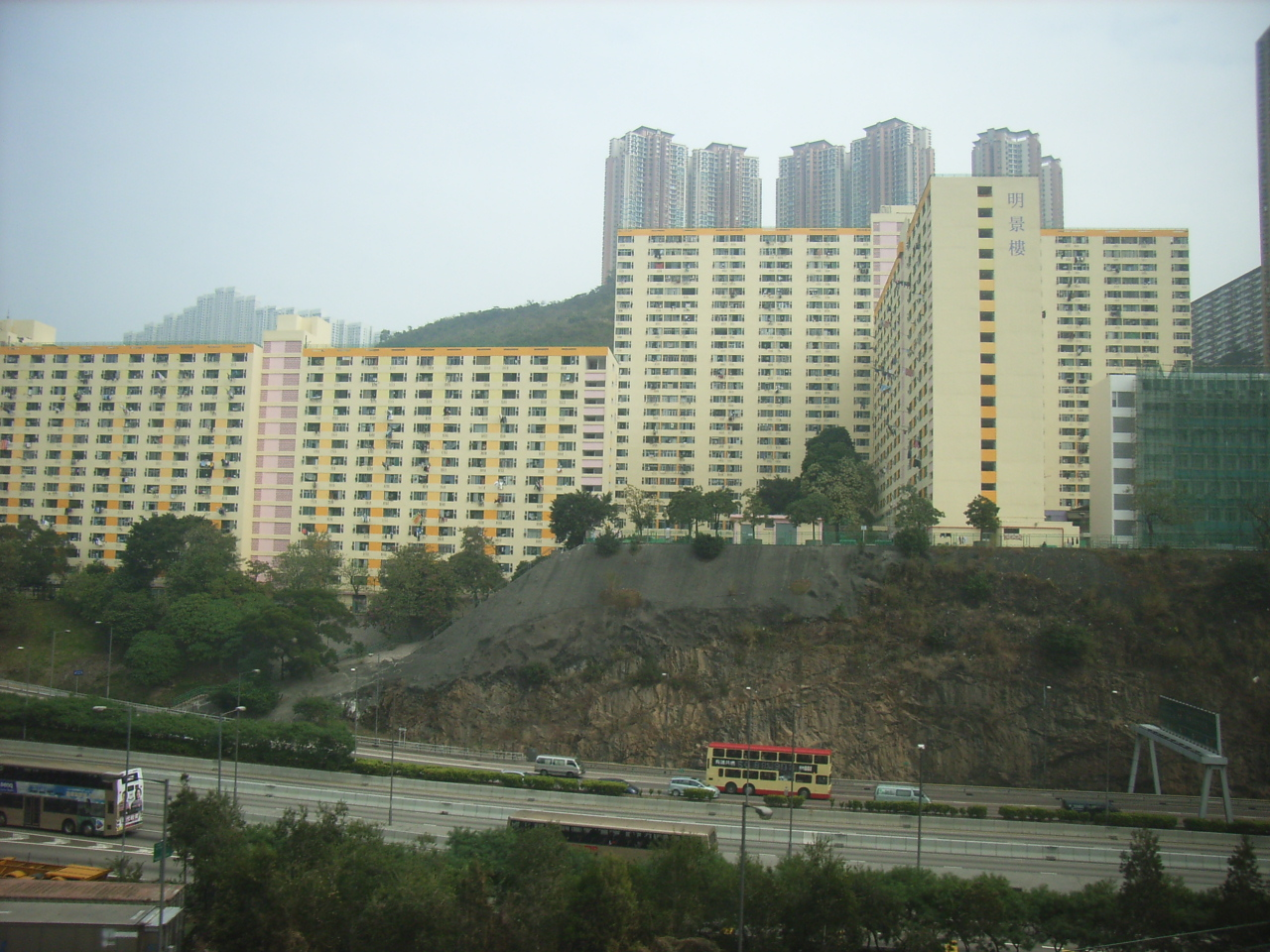
Lai King Estate

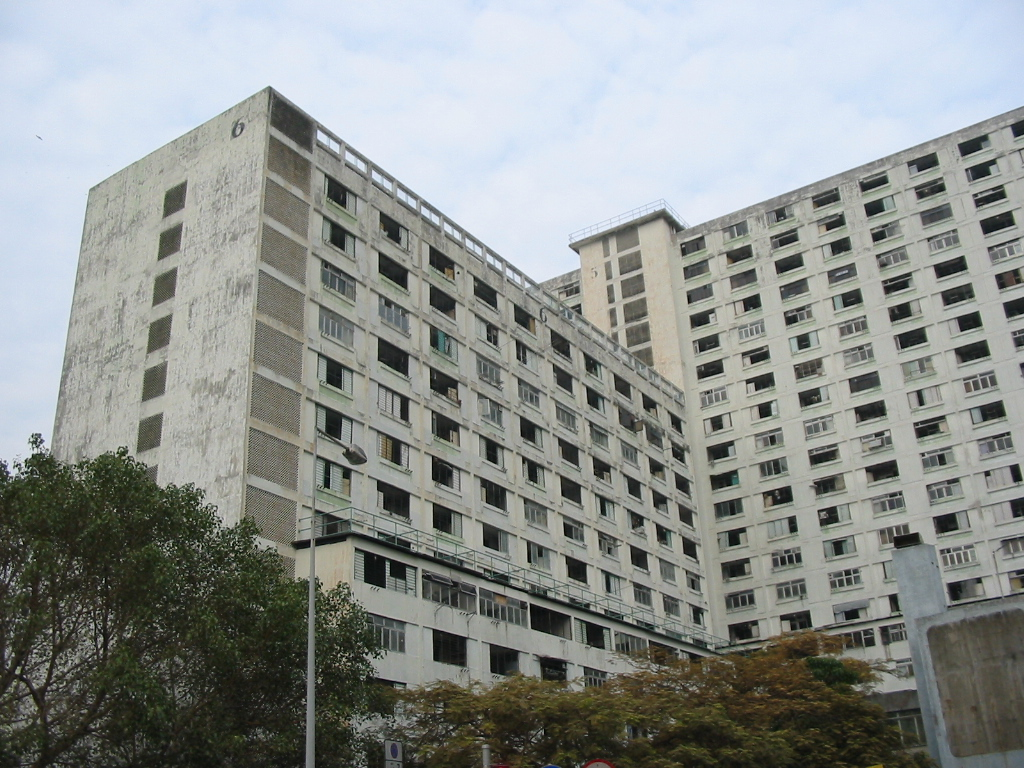
Wong Chuk Hang Estate, demolished in 2009

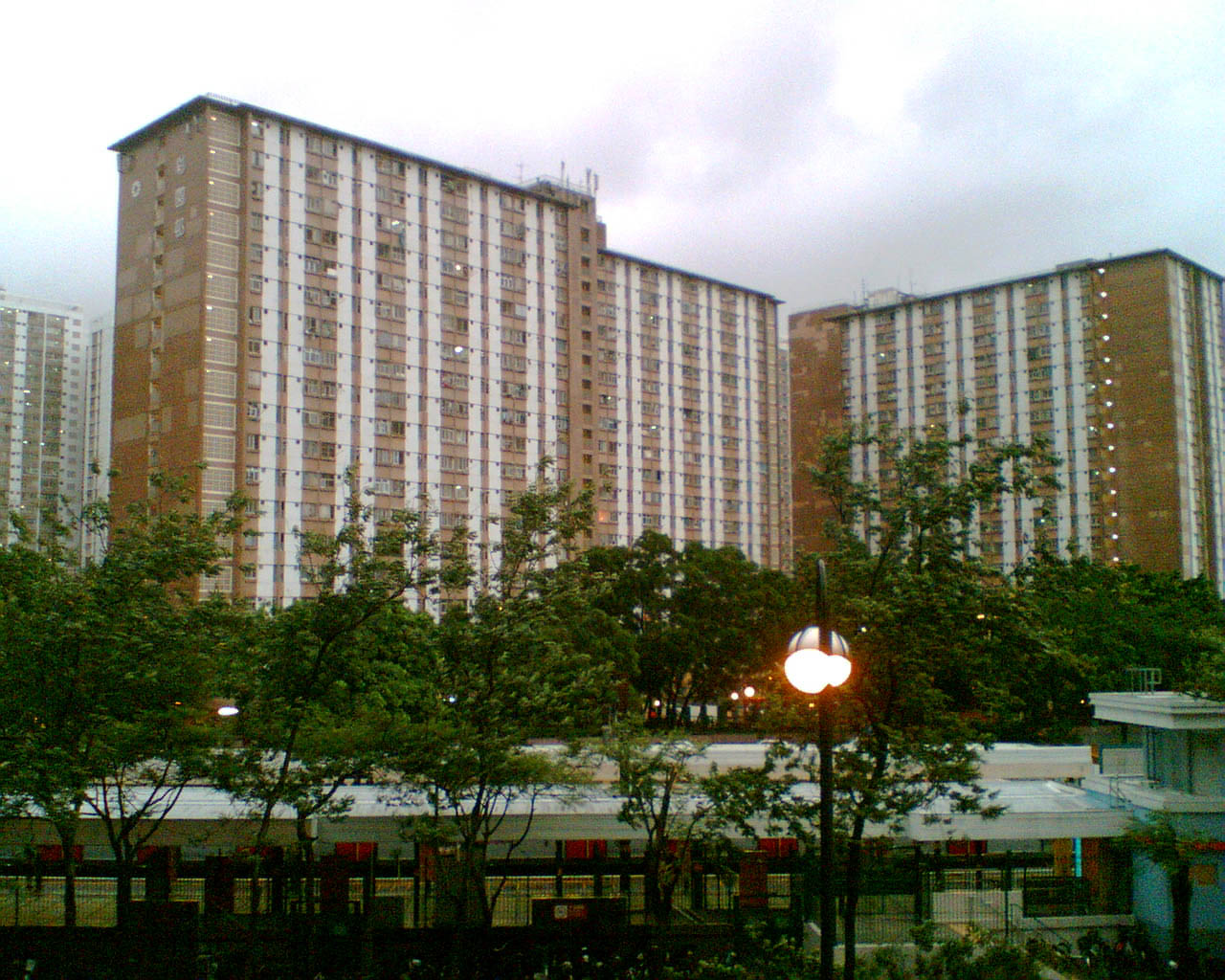
Choi Yuen Estate

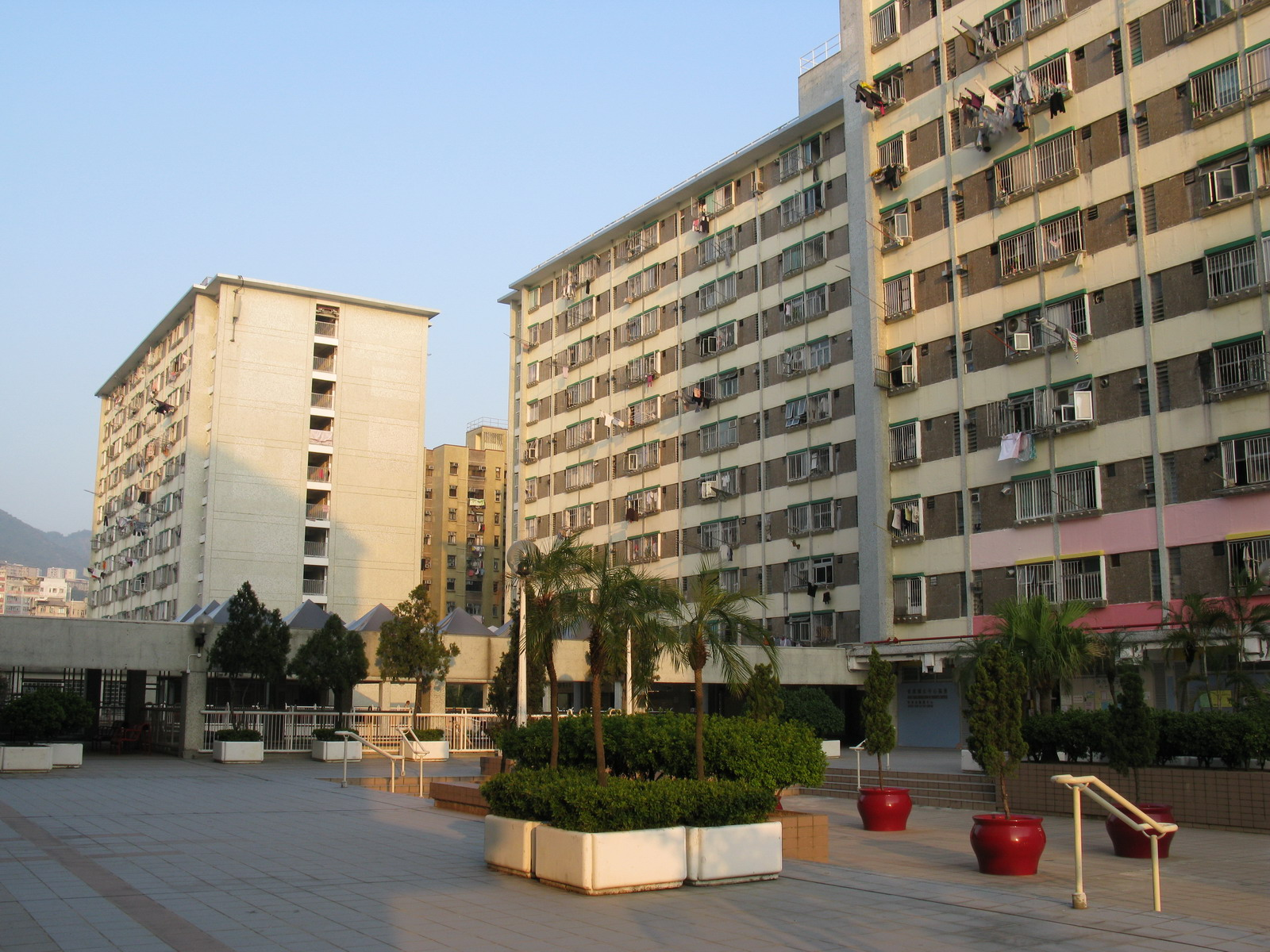
Lai Kok Estate

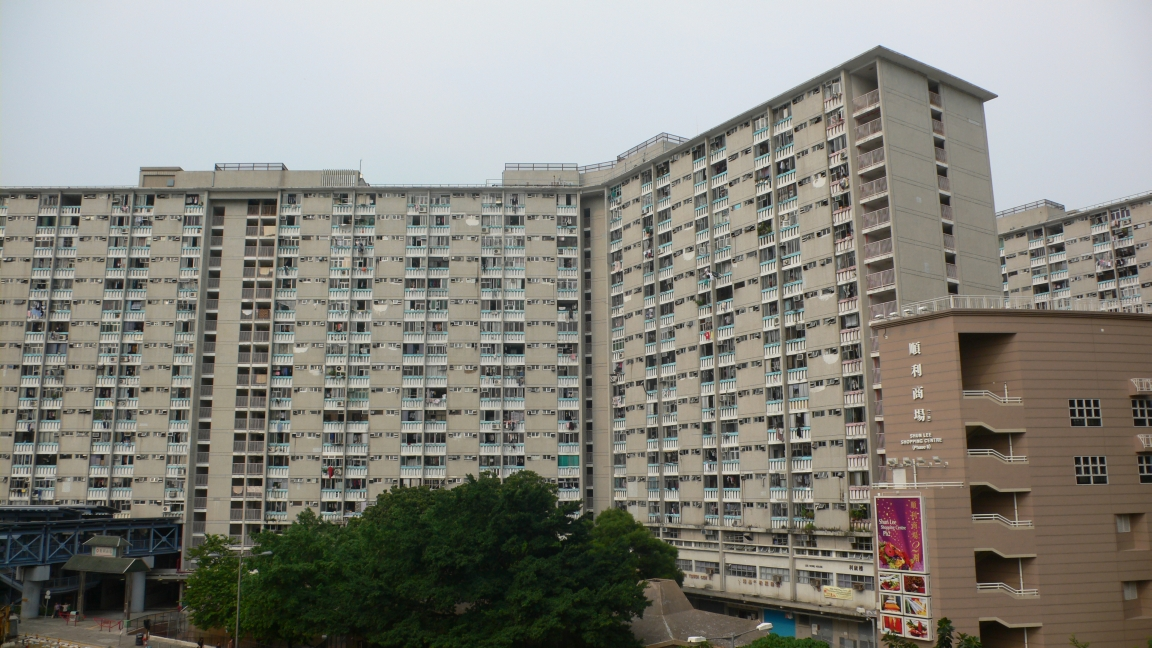
Shun Lee Estate

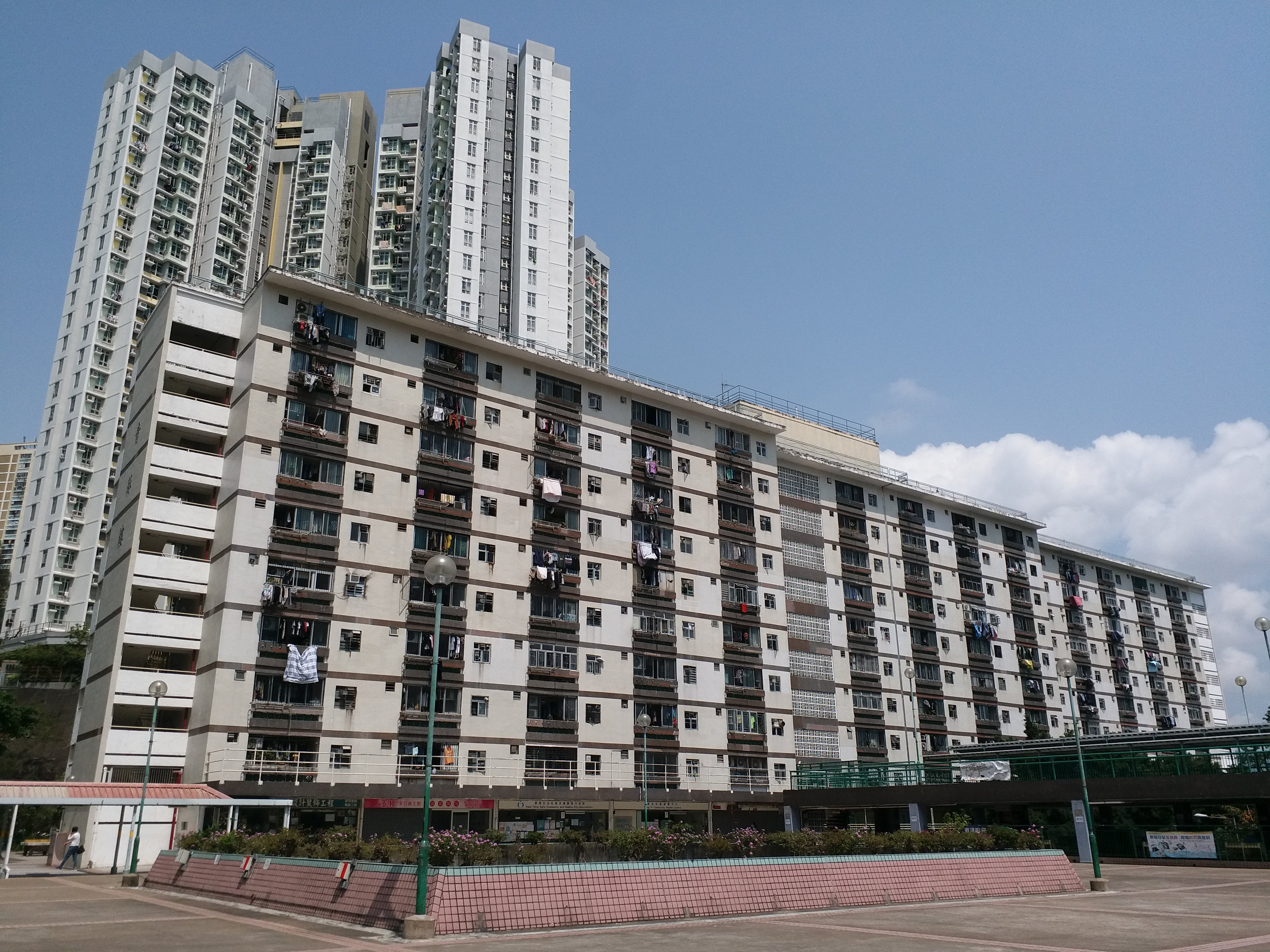
Cheung Ching Estate

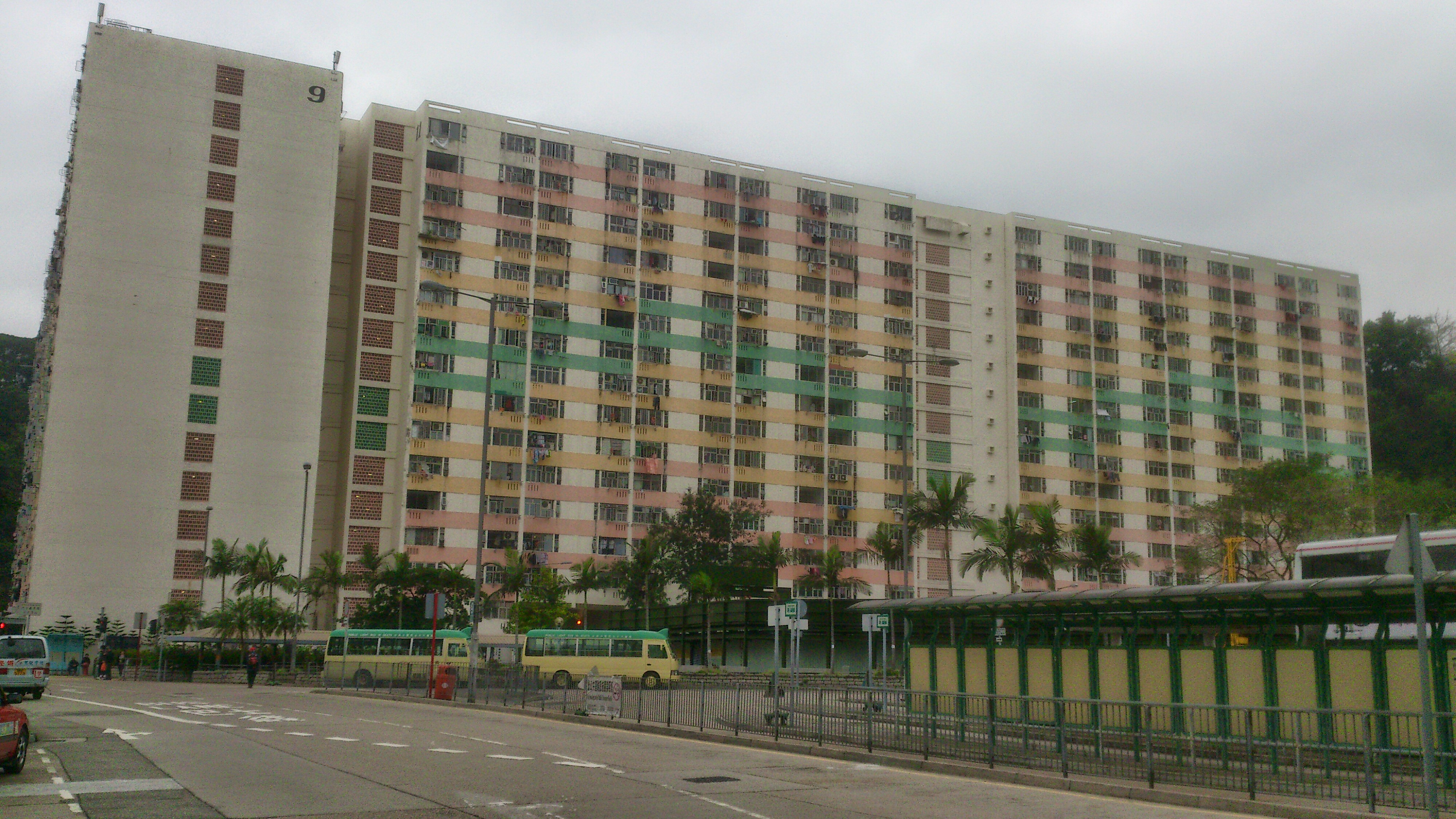
Pak Tin Estate

== See also ==
- Types of public housing estate blocks in Hong Kong
