= Kwun Tong District Council =

Hong Kong district council

Kwun Tong District Council 觀塘區議會

Type
- Type: Hong Kong District Council of the Kwun Tong District

History
- Founded: 2 April 1981 (District Board); 1 July 1997 (Provisional); 1 January 2000 (District Council)

Leadership
- Chair: Denny Ho Lap-ki, Independent
- Vice-Chair: Vacant

Structure
- Seats: 40 councillors consisting of 8 elected members 16 district committee members 16 appointed members
- DAB: 11 / 40
- FTU: 5 / 40
- FPHE: 5 / 40
- New Forum: 1 / 40
- Independent: 23 / 40

Elections
- Voting system: First past the post
- Last election: 10 December 2023

Meeting place
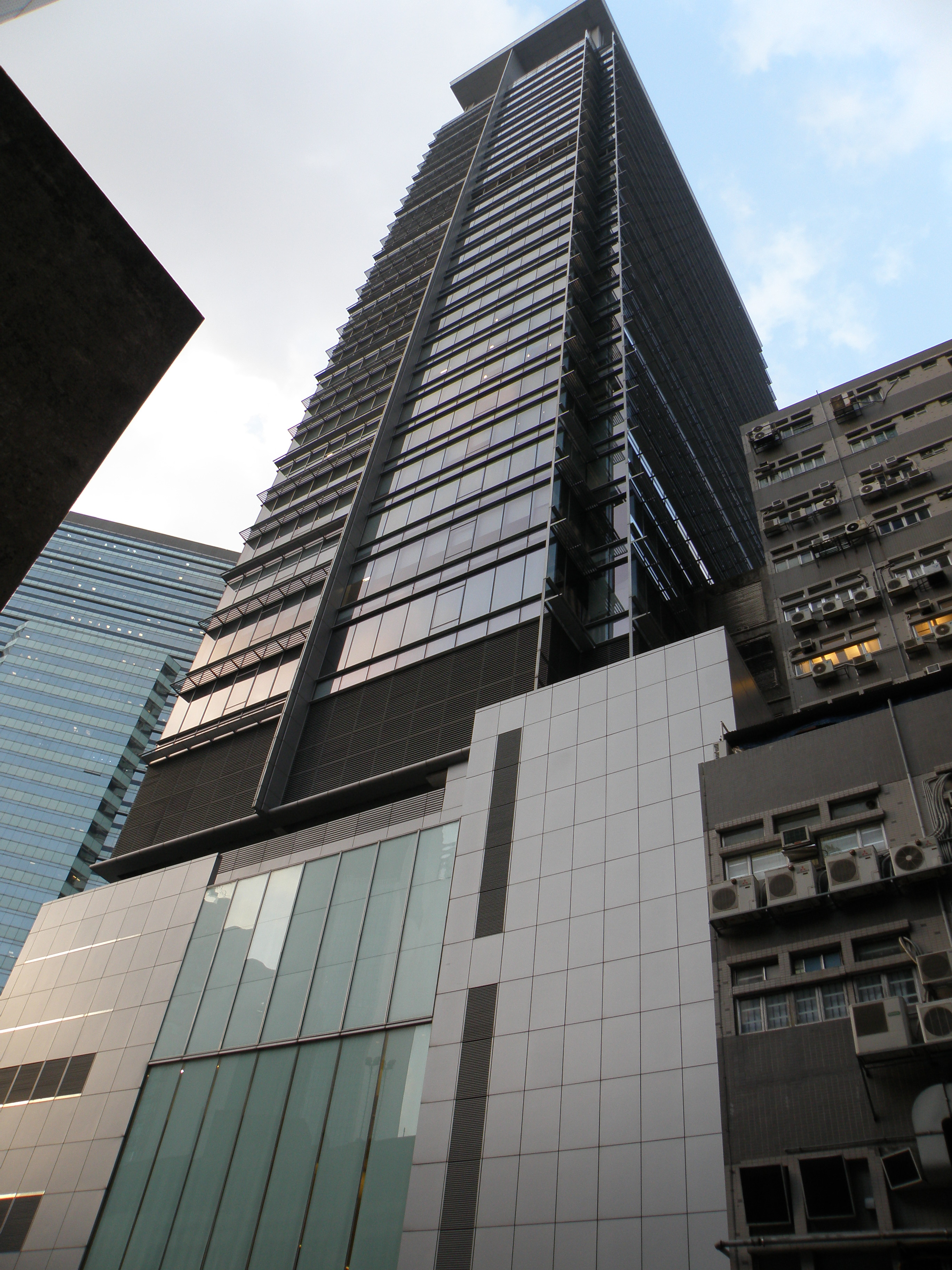
- Unit 05-07, 20/F Millennium City 6, Kwun Tong Road, Kwun Tong, Kowloon

Website
- www.districtcouncils.gov.hk/kt/

The Kwun Tong District Council (Chinese: 觀塘區議會; noted as KT) is the district council for the Kwun Tong District in Hong Kong. It is one of 18 such councils. The Kwun Tong District Council consists of 40 members since January 2020, of which the district is divided into 4 constituencies, electing a total of 8 members, 16 district committee members, and 16 appointed members. The council was created in April 1981 under the District Board Ordinance 1981. The last election was held on 24 November 2023.

== History ==
The Kwun Tong District Council was established on 2 April 1981 under the name of the Kwun Tong District Board as the result of the colonial Governor Murray MacLehose's District Administration Scheme reform. The District Board was partly elected with the ex-officio Urban Council members, as well as members appointed by the Governor until 1994 when last Governor Chris Patten refrained from appointing any member.

The Kwun Tong District Board became Kwun Tong Provisional District Board after the Hong Kong Special Administrative Region (HKSAR) was established in 1997 with the appointment system being reintroduced by Chief Executive Tung Chee-hwa. The Kwun Tong District Council was established on 1 January 2000 after the first post-handover District Council election in 1999. The council has become fully elected when the appointed seats were abolished in 2011 after the modified constitutional reform proposal was passed by the Legislative Council in 2010.

The Kwun Tong District Council is one of the largest District Councils in Hong Kong. Due to its large population, the political parties' influence was countered by the conservative independent community leaders. Because of the large presence of lower-income groups and industrial character, the Kwun Tong District Council has also been a stronghold for the pro-Beijing grassroots political groups, including the Kwun Tong Residents Association headed by Hau Shui-pui, council chairman from 1997 to 2003, and Democratic Alliance for the Betterment and Progress of Hong Kong (DAB) and its Legislative Councillor Chan Kam-lam. It also the voter base of pro-democracy politicians Szeto Wah of the Hong Kong Professional Teachers' Union (PTU), and Fred Li of the Meeting Point who was first elected to the District Board in the 1985 election and got directly elected to the Legislative Council with Szeto through the district in 1991.

The pro-democracy camp first achieved more than half of the elected seats and took control of the board in the 1994 election. The pro-democracy majority was offset by the appointed members after 1997. In the tide of democracy caused by the 2003 July 1 march, the pro-democrats again achieved majority of the elected seats but was countered by the appointed seats. The pro-democracy influence shrank significantly after 2003, with the Democratic Party dropped their seats from nine seats in the 2003 election to three in their territory-wide defeat in 2007 and had not yet been able to recover from it until the 2019 landslide victory which gave the pro-democrats the control of the council with 28 of the 40 seats and Democratic Party rebounding to the largest party status.

== Political control ==
Since 1982 political control of the council has been held by the following parties:

Camp in control	Largest party	Years	Composition
No Overall Control	Civic Association	1982–1985	
Pro-government	Civic Association	1985–1988	
Pro-government	Meeting Point	1988–1991	
No Overall Control	United Democrats	1991–1994	
Pro-democracy	Democratic	1994–1997	
Pro-Beijing	Democratic	1997–1999	
Pro-Beijing	Democratic	2000–2003	
Pro-Beijing	Democratic → DAB	2004–2007	
Pro-Beijing	DAB	2008–2011	
Pro-Beijing	DAB	2012–2015	
Pro-Beijing	DAB	2016–2019	
Pro-democracy → Pro-Beijing	Democratic → DAB	2020–2023	
Pro-Beijing	DAB	2024–2027	

== Political makeup ==

Elections are held every four years.

Political party	Council members							Current members
Political party	1994	1999	2003	2007	2011	2015	2019	Current members
Independent	11	18	21	22	20	19	18	6 / 16
Democratic	7	9	9	3	2	3	9	1 / 16
DAB	4	6	4	9	12	10	6	6 / 16
FPHE	-	-	-	-	-	1	2	2 / 16
FTU	-	-	-	-	1	2	1	1 / 16
KEC	-	-	-	-	-	0	-	0 / 16

== District result maps ==
1994

1999

2003

2007

2011

2015

2019

== Members represented ==
Capacity	Code	Constituency	Name	Political affiliation	Term		Notes
Elected	J01	Kwun Tong Southeast	Pang Chi-sang	FPHE	1 January 2024	Incumbent	
Elected	J01	Kwun Tong Southeast	Kan Ming-tung	FTU	1 January 2024	Incumbent	
Elected	J02	Kwun Tong Central	Wilson Or Chong-shing	DAB	1 January 2024	Incumbent	
Elected	J02	Kwun Tong Central	Marco Ma Yat-chiu	New Forum	1 January 2024	Incumbent	
Elected	J03	Kwun Tong North	Cheung Pui-kong	DAB	1 January 2024	Incumbent	
Elected	J03	Kwun Tong North	Fu Pik-chun	Independent	1 January 2024	Incumbent	
Elected	J04	Kwun Tong West	Tam Siu-cheuk	DAB	1 January 2024	Incumbent	
Elected	J04	Kwun Tong West	Tony Lee Ka-hang	FTU	1 January 2024	Incumbent	
District Committees			Cheung Yiu-pan	DAB	1 January 2024	Incumbent	
District Committees			Derek Tsang Wing-fai	DAB	1 January 2024	Incumbent	
District Committees			April Feng Yunsi	DAB	1 January 2024	Incumbent	
District Committees			Au Yeung Kwan-nok	DAB	1 January 2024	Incumbent	
District Committees			Ching Hoi-yan	FTU	1 January 2024	Incumbent	
District Committees			Wong Kai-san	FTU	1 January 2024	Incumbent	
District Committees			Cheng Keung-fung	FPHE	1 January 2024	Incumbent	
District Committees			Ng Ting-fung	Independent	1 January 2024	Incumbent	
District Committees			Sophia Lee Shuk-woon	Independent	1 January 2024	Incumbent	
District Committees			Yu Ka-ming	Independent	1 January 2024	Incumbent	
District Committees			Lam Fung	Independent	1 January 2024	Incumbent	
District Committees			Kam Kin	Independent	1 January 2024	Incumbent	
District Committees			Fong Yat-kwan	Independent	1 January 2024	Incumbent	
District Committees			Boe Zhan Bao-yu	Independent	1 January 2024	Incumbent	
District Committees			Tang Wing-chun	Independent	1 January 2024	Incumbent	
District Committees			Kwan Kin-wing	Independent	1 January 2024	Incumbent	
Appointed			Hung Kam-in	DAB	1 January 2024	Incumbent	
Appointed			Hsu Yau-wai	DAB	1 January 2024	Incumbent	
Appointed			Jack Cheung Ki-tang	DAB	1 January 2024	Incumbent	
Appointed			Juliana Yu	DAB	1 January 2024	Incumbent	
Appointed			Alan Yu Siu-lung	FTU/DAB	1 January 2024	Incumbent	
Appointed			Lui Tung-hai	FPHE	1 January 2024	Incumbent	
Appointed			Ng Si-wah	Independent	1 January 2024	Incumbent	
Appointed			Yu Man	Independent	1 January 2024	Incumbent	
Appointed			Lam Wai	Independent	1 January 2024	Incumbent	
Appointed			Renee Leung Sze-wan	Independent	1 January 2024	Incumbent	
Appointed			Lin Ho-man	Independent	1 January 2024	Incumbent	
Appointed			Jimmy Chan Yiu-hung	Independent	1 January 2024	Incumbent	
Appointed			Jackson Wong Chun-ping	Independent	1 January 2024	Incumbent	
Appointed			Lau Kar-wah	Independent	1 January 2024	Incumbent	
Appointed			Chu Lok-wai	Independent	1 January 2024	Incumbent	
Appointed			Lai Wing-chun	Independent	1 January 2024	Incumbent	

== Leadership ==
=== Chairs ===
Since 1985, the chairman is elected by all the members of the board:

Chairman	Years	Political Affiliation
David Tsui Kwan-ping	1981–1982	District Officer
Kevin I. K. Mak	1982–1985	District Officer
Lam Hang-fai	1985–1994	Independent
Winnie Poon Yam Wai-chun	1994–1997	Independent
Hau Shui-pui	1997–2003	Independent
Bunny Chan Chung-bun	2004–2019	Independent
Choy Chak-hung	2020–2021	Independent
Wilson Or Chong-shing	2021–2023	DAB
Denny Ho Lap-ki	2024–present	District Officer

=== Vice Chairs ===
Vice Chairman	Years	Political Affiliation
Wu Kwok-cheung	2000–2003	Independent
Leung Fu-wing	2004–2007	Independent
So Lai-chun	2008–2015	Independent
Hung Kam-in	2016–2019	DAB
Mok Kin-shing	2020–2021	Democratic
Lui Tung-hai	2021–2023	Independent
