= Tai Po Central (constituency) =

- Elected constituency for the Tai Po District Council
- Boundary of Tai Po Central in Tai Po District
- District: Tai Po
- Legislative Council constituency: New Territories North East
- Population: 13,645 (2019)
- Electorate: 8,326 (2019)

Current constituency
- Created: 1982
- Number of members: One
- Member(s): Vacant

Tai Po Central is one of the 19 constituencies in the Tai Po District.

The constituency returns one district councillor to the Tai Po District Council, with an election every four years. The seat has been currently held by Au Chun-wah.

Tai Po Central constituency is loosely based on Tai Po Centre with estimated population of 13,645.

== Councillors represented ==
=== 1982 to 1985 ===
Election	Member	Party	Member	Party
1982	Lee Ping-kwai	Independent	Tang Pui-tat	Independent

=== 1985 to 1988 ===
Election	Member	Party
1985	Tang Pui-tat	Independent

=== 1988 to 1994 ===
Election	Member	Party	Member	Party
1988	Cheng Chun-ping	Independent	Tang Pui-tat	Independent
1990	Cheng Chun-ping	LDF	Tang Pui-tat	Independent

=== 1994 to present ===
Election	Member	Party
1994	Poon Fung-loi	Democratic
1999	Andrew Cheng Kar-foo	Democratic
2010	Andrew Cheng Kar-foo	Independent
2011	Au Chun-wah→Vacant	Democratic
2018	Au Chun-wah→Vacant	Independent
2019	Au Chun-wah→Vacant	Community Alliance

== Election results ==
=== 2010s ===
Tai Po District Council Election, 2019: Tai Po Central
Party	Candidate	Votes	%	±%
Community Alliance	Au Chun-wah	4,279	67.21	+16.71
DAB	Mui Siu-fung	2,136	32.79	−6.31
Majority		2,143	34.42	
Turnout		6,451	77.49	
Community Alliance hold		Swing		

Tai Po District Council Election, 2015: Tai Po Central
Party	Candidate	Votes	%	±%
Democratic	Au Chun-wah	1,866	50.5	+3.8
DAB	Mui Siu-fung	1,444	39.1	
Independent	Man Wai-keung	384	10.4	
Majority		422	11.4	
Turnout		3,749	49.7	
Democratic hold		Swing		

Tai Po District Council Election, 2011: Tai Po Central
Party	Candidate	Votes	%	±%
Democratic	Au Chun-wah	1,271	46.7	
Independent	Cheng Mei-lam	815	30.0	
Liberal	Thomas Cheung Chi-wai	634	23.3	
Democratic gain from Independent		Swing		

=== 2000s ===
Tai Po District Council Election, 2007: Tai Po Central
Party	Candidate	Votes	%	±%
Democratic	Andrew Cheng Kar-foo	1,503	55.5	−14.9
Independent	Chan Shek-pong	1,207	44.5	
Democratic hold		Swing		

Tai Po District Council Election, 2003: Tai Po Central
Party	Candidate	Votes	%	±%
Democratic	Andrew Cheng Kar-foo	2,307	70.4	+22.0
DAB	Eric Tam Wing-fun	971	29.6	
Democratic hold		Swing		

=== 1990s ===
Tai Po District Council Election, 1999: Tai Po Central
Party	Candidate	Votes	%	±%
Democratic	Andrew Cheng Kar-foo	1,357	48.4	+5.2
Independent	Wong Lung-biu	690	24.6	
Independent	Ervin Lee Siu-man	438	15.6	
Independent	Man Wai-leung	313	11.2	
Democratic hold		Swing		

Tai Po District Board Election, 1994: Tai Po Central
Party	Candidate	Votes	%	±%
Democratic	Poon Fung-loi	1,143	43.2	
LDF	Cheng Chun-ping	1,070	40.5	−22.7
Liberal	Cheng Tin-yau	411	15.5	
Democratic gain from LDF		Swing		

Tai Po District Board Election, 1991: Tai Po Central
Party	Candidate	Votes	%	±%
LDF	Cheng Chun-ping	2,528	63.2	+12.8
Independent	Tang Pui-tat	2,439	61.0	+6.9
Independent	Franklin Au Yick-ming	1,724	43.1	
LDF hold		Swing		
Independent hold		Swing		

=== 1980s ===
Tai Po District Board Election, 1988: Tai Po Central
Party	Candidate	Votes	%	±%
Independent	Tang Pui-tat	2,353	54.1	−15.8
Independent	Cheng Chun-ping	2,191	50.4	
Independent	Wong Yung-kan	1,681	38.7	
Independent	Tsui Siu-keung	927	21.3	
Independent hold		Swing		
Independent win (new seat)				

Tai Po District Board Election, 1985: Tai Po Central
Party	Candidate	Votes	%	±%
Independent	Tang Pui-tat	2,250	69.9	+34.6
Independent	So Yuen-fai	953	29.6	+2.0
Independent hold		Swing		

Tai Po District Board Election, 1982: Tai Po Central
Party	Candidate	Votes	%	±%
Independent	Lee Ping-kwai	1,115	43.5	
Independent	Tang Pui-tat	904	35.3	
Independent	So Yuen-fai	707	27.6	
Independent	Yau Siu-lung	636	24.8	
Independent	Chan Siu-fung	426	16.6	
Independent	Chung Yuk-fun	198	7.7	
Independent	Cheng Man-hing	106	4.1	
Independent win (new seat)				
Independent win (new seat)				
