= Wang Fuk (constituency) =

Municipality in Hong Kong

- Elected constituency for the Tai Po District Council
- Boundary of Wang Fuk in Tai Po District
- District: Tai Po
- Legislative Council constituency: New Territories North East
- Population: 19,301 (2019)
- Electorate: 10,668 (2019)

Current constituency
- Created: 1994
- Number of members: One
- Member: Vacant

Wang Fuk (Chinese: 宏福) is one of the 19 constituencies in the Tai Po District of Hong Kong.

The constituency returns one district councillor to the Tai Po District Council, with an election every four years.

Wang Fuk constituency has an estimated population of 19,301.

== Councillors represented ==
Election	Member	Party
1994	Wong Yiu-chee	Liberal
2003	Peggy Wong Pik-kiu	DAB
2015	Clement Woo Kin-man	DAB
2019	Herman Yiu Kwan-ho→Vacant (Note: Disqualified on 6 June 2022.)	Community Alliance

== Election results ==
=== 2010s ===
Tai Po District Council Election, 2019: Wang Fuk
Party	Candidate	Votes	%	±%
Community Alliance	Herman Yiu Kwan-ho	4,266	56.73	
DAB	Clement Woo Kin-man	3,254	43.27	
Majority		1,012	13.46	
Turnout		7,548	70.79	
Community Alliance gain from DAB		Swing		
