= Tai Yuen (constituency) =

- Elected constituency for the Tai Po District Council
- Boundary of Tai Yuen in Tai Po District
- District: Tai Po
- Legislative Council constituency: New Territories North East
- Population: 13,863 (2019)
- Electorate: 9,193 (2019)

Current constituency
- Created: 1994
- Number of members: One
- Member: Au Chun-ho (Community Alliance)

Tai Yuen (Chinese: 大元) is one of the 19 constituencies in the Tai Po District of Hong Kong.

The constituency returns one district councillor to the Tai Po District Council, with an election every four years.

Tai Yuen constituency has an estimated population of 13,863.

== Councillors represented ==
Election	Member	Party
1994	Tang Pui-tat	Nonpartisan
1999	Cheng Chun-ping	Progressive Alliance
2005	Cheng Chun-ping	DAB
2019	Au Chun-ho	Community Alliance

== Election results ==
=== 2010s ===
Tai Po District Council Election, 2019: Tai Yuen
Party	Candidate	Votes	%	±%
Community Alliance	Au Chun-ho	3,693	57.81	
DAB	Cheng Chun-ping	2,135	33.42	
Independent	So Ma-tsun	442	6.92	
Nonpartisan	Color Wong Ting-yan	118	1.85	
Majority		1,558	24.39	
Turnout		6,414	69.81	
Community Alliance gain from DAB		Swing		
