= Kwong Fuk & Plover Cove (constituency) =

Constituency of Hong Kong

- Elected constituency for the Tai Po District Council
- Boundary of Kwong Fuk & Plover Cove in Tai Po District
- District: Tai Po
- Legislative Council constituency: New Territories North East
- Population: 12,858 (2019)
- Electorate: 9,176 (2019)

Current constituency
- Created: 1994
- Number of members: One
- Member: Vacant

Kwong Fuk & Plover Cove (Chinese: 廣福及寶湖) is one of the 19 constituencies in the Tai Po District of Hong Kong.

The constituency returns one district councillor to the Tai Po District Council, with an election every four years.

The Kwong Fuk & Plover Cove constituency has an estimated population of 12,858.

== Councillors represented ==
Election	Member	Party
1994	Johnny Wong Chi-keung	LDF→Progressive Alliance
1999	Johnny Wong Chi-keung	Progressive Alliance
2003	Au Chun-wah	Frontier
2007	Lam Chuen	DAB
2011	Lam Chuen	DAB
2015	Peggy Wong Pik-kiu	DAB
2019	Dalu Lin Kok-cheung→Vacant (Note: Resigned on 10 May 2021 over new oath-taking law.)	TPDA

== Election results ==
=== 2010s ===
Tai Po District Council Election, 2019: Kwong Fuk & Plover Cove
Party	Candidate	Votes	%	±%
TPDA	Dalu Lin Kok-cheung	3,768	57.06	
DAB	Peggy Wong Pik-kiu	2,804	42.47	
Nonpartisan	Andrew Kwok Shu-yan	31	0.45	
Majority		964	14.59	
Turnout		7,719	72.23	
TPDA gain from DAB		Swing		
