= Tai Po Hui (constituency) =

Constituency of the Tai Po District Council of Hong Kong

- Elected constituency for the Tai Po District Council
- Boundary of Tai Po Hui in Tai Po District
- District: Tai Po
- Legislative Council constituency: New Territories North East
- Population: 19,451 (2019)
- Electorate: 6,726 (2019)

Current constituency
- Created: 1994
- Number of members: One
- Member: Lam Ming-yat (TPDA)

Tai Po Hui is one of the 19 constituencies in the Tai Po District.

The constituency returns one district councillor to the Tai Po District Council, with an election every four years. The seat has been currently held by Lam Ming-yat of the TPDA.

Tai Po Hui constituency is loosely based on Tai Po Market (Tai Po Hui) with estimated population of 19,451.

== Councillors represented ==
Election	Member	Party
1994	Yau Fook-ping	Liberal
1999	Li Kwok-ying	DAB
2003	Li Kwok-ying	DAB
2007	Li Kwok-ying	DAB
2011	Li Kwok-ying	DAB
2015	Li Kwok-ying	DAB
2019	Lam Ming-yat→Vacant (Note: Resigned on 10 May 2021 over new oath-taking law.)	TPDA

== Election results ==
=== 2010s ===
Tai Po District Council Election, 2019: Tai Po Hui
Party	Candidate	Votes	%	±%
TPDA	Lam Ming-yat	2,466	56.66	
Independent	William Cheung Kwok-wai	1,886	43.34	
Majority		580	13.32	
Turnout		4,364	64.92	
TPDA gain from DAB		Swing		

Tai Po District Council Election, 2015: Tai Po Hui
Party	Candidate	Votes	%	±%
DAB	Li Kwok-ying	1,096	55.9	−1.2
Nonpartisan	Molly Choy Wing-mui	865	44.1	+1.2
Majority		231	11.8	
Turnout		2,015	32.4	
DAB hold		Swing		

Tai Po District Council Election, 2011: Tai Po Market
Party	Candidate	Votes	%	±%
DAB	Li Kwok-ying	1,172	57.1	+4.7
Civic	Alvin Yeung Ngok-kiu	880	42.9	−3.3
DAB hold		Swing		

=== 2000s ===
Tai Po District Council Election, 2007: Tai Po Market
Party	Candidate	Votes	%	±%
DAB	Li Kwok-ying	1,351	53.8	−8.8
Civic	Tsang Kwok-fung	1,162	46.2	
DAB hold		Swing		

Tai Po District Council Election, 2003: Tai Po Market
Party	Candidate	Votes	%	±%
DAB	Li Kwok-ying	1,068	62.8	−2.6
Independent	Ada Tang Yuen-lan	633	37.2	
DAB hold		Swing		

=== 1990s ===
Tai Po District Council Election, 1999: Tai Po Market
Party	Candidate	Votes	%	±%
DAB	Li Kwok-ying	1,285	65.6	
Liberal	Yau Fook-ping	628	32.1	−10.1
DAB gain from Liberal		Swing		

Tai Po District Board Election, 1994: Tai Po Market
Party	Candidate	Votes	%	±%
Liberal	Yau Fook-ping	1,150	42.2	
TPRA	Li Yau-hing	1,049	38.5	
Independent	Lai Wai-cheong	483	17.7	
Liberal win (new seat)				
