= Tai Po Democratic Alliance =

Tai Po Democratic Alliance 大埔民主聯盟
- Founded: 2019
- Ideology: Liberalism (Hong Kong); Tai Po regionalism
- Regional affiliation: Pro-democracy camp
- Colours: Green
- Legislative Council: 0 / 90
- Tai Po District Council: 0 / 22

Website
- Official Facebook page

Tai Po Democratic Alliance (Chinese: 大埔民主聯盟) is a loose political alliance consisting of the 17 candidates in the 2019 District Council election for the Tai Po District Council. With the pro-democracy camp winning all the elected seats in the election, the alliance also saw 16 of its candidates being elected. While four of them ran under the banner of the alliance, the others ran either with their own political groups or as independents.

== History ==
The pro-democracy camp controlled six seats in the Tai Po District Council before the 2019 District Council election. In order to maximise the pro-democratic forces, the incumbent District Councillors joined hand with eight other hopefuls to form the Tai Po Democratic Alliance.

The alliance had 17 members running in the election whereas some candidates ran as members of Neo Democrats and Community Alliance, as well as independents. There were four members that ran under the banner of the alliance, including Lam Ming-yat in Tai Po Hui, Dalu Lin Kok-cheung in Kwong Fuk & Plover Cove, Patrick Mo Ka-chun in Tai Po Kau, and "airport uncle" Richard Chan Chun-chit in Lam Tsuen Valley. All four candidates were elected with the pro-democrats and took all 19 of the elected seats in the council. Only alliance member Yam Man-chuen was unseated by another pro-democrat candidate Ho Wai-lam in Fu Heng resulting for the alliance unofficially winning a total number of 16 seats.

== Performance in elections ==
=== Tai Po District Council elections ===
Election	Number of popular votes	% of popular votes	Total elected seats	+/−
2019	13,185	9.81	4 / 19	4▲
