= Tai Po Kau (constituency) =

- Elected constituency for the Tai Po District Council
- Boundary of Tai Po Kau in Tai Po District
- District: Tai Po
- Legislative Council constituency: New Territories North East
- Population: 18,120 (2019)
- Electorate: 8,538 (2019)

Current constituency
- Created: 1994
- Number of members: One
- Member: Patrick Mo Ka-chun (TPDA)

Tai Po Kau (Chinese: 大埔滘) is one of the 19 constituencies in the Tai Po District of Hong Kong.

The constituency returns one district councillor to the Tai Po District Council, with an election every four years.

Tai Po Kau constituency has an estimated population of 18,120.

== Councillors represented ==
Election	Member	Party
1994	Wu Kam-fai	Democratic
1999	Chan Siu-kuen	Nonpartisan
2019	Patrick Mo Ka-chun	TPDA

== Election results ==
=== 2010s ===
Tai Po District Council Election, 2019: Tai Po Kau
Party	Candidate	Votes	%	±%
TPDA	Patrick Mo Ka-chun	3,346	53.55	
Nonpartisan	Chan Siu-kuen	2,902	46.45	
Majority		444	7.10	
Turnout		6,273	73.49	
TPDA gain from Nonpartisan		Swing		
