= Li Kwok-ying =

Li Kwok-ying MH (Chinese: 李國英, born 18 November 1949 in Tai Po, New Territories, Hong Kong with family roots in Baoan, Guangdong) was a member of the Legislative Council of Hong Kong representing New Territories East and a member of Tai Po District Council for Tai Po Hui. He is a Punti of New Territories. He is a solicitor and a member of Democratic Alliance for the Betterment and Progress of Hong Kong.

Li attended John Moores University in England and is married with two children. His wife is the cousin of Andrew Cheng Kar Foo.

Political offices
Preceded by Yau Fook-ping	Member of Tai Po District Council; Representative for Tai Po Hui; 2000–2019	Succeeded by Lam Ming-yat
Legislative Council of Hong Kong
New seat	Legislative Council of Hong Kong; Representative for New Territories East; 2004–2008	Succeeded by Gary Chan
