= 2019 Tai Po District Council election =

Hong Kong local election

- 24 November 2019

19 (of the 21) seats to Tai Po District Council 11 seats needed for a majority
- Turnout: 72.0% ▲27.1%
	First party	Second party	Third party
Party	Neo Democrats	Community Alliance	TPDA
Last election	3 seats, 15.9%	New party	New party
Seats before	3	1	0
Seats won	4	4	4
Seat change	▲1	▲3	▲4
Popular vote	21,790	16,692	13,185
Percentage	16.2%	12.4%	9.8%
Swing	▲0.3%	N/A	N/A
	Fourth party	Fifth party	Sixth party
Party	Civic Passion	DAB	BPA
Last election	Did not contest	5 seats, 28.4%	New party
Seats before	0	5	3
Seats won	1	0	0
Seat change	▲1	▼5	▼3
Popular vote	5,541	18,832	8,709
Percentage	4.1%	14.0%	6.5%
Swing	N/A	▼14.4%	▼0.9%
- Colours on map indicate winning party for each constituency.

The 2019 Tai Po District Council election was held on 24 November 2019 to elect all 19 elected members to the 21-member Tai Po District Council.

The pro-democrats achieved a historic landslide victory by sweeping all the elected seats in the council amid the massive pro-democracy protests. The pro-Beijing camp was completely wiped out except for the two ex officio members who were also the rural committee chairmen.

== Overall election results ==
Before election: Change in composition:

↓
6	15
Pro-democracy	Pro-Beijing

Change in composition:

↓
19	2
Pro-democracy	PB

Tai Po Council election result 2019
Party	Seats	Gains	Losses	Net gain/loss	Seats %	Votes %	Votes	+/−
Independent	6	5	6	−1	31.6	33.8	45,381	
Neo Democrats	4	1	0	+1	21.1	16.2	21,790	+0.3
DAB	0	0	5	−5	0.0	14.0	18,832	−14.4
Community Alliance	4	3	0	+3	21.1	12.4	16,692	
TPDA	4	4	0	+4	21.1	9.8	13,185	
BPA	0	0	3	−3	0.0	6.5	8,709	−0.9
Civic Passion	0	1	1	+1	5.3	4.1	5,541	
NPP	0	0	0	0	0.0	1.7	2,310	
FTU	0	0	0	0	0.0	1.5	1,962	−0.3
