= 2015 Tai Po District Council election =

Hong Kong local election

- 22 November 2015

19 (of the 21) seats to Tai Po District Council 11 seats needed for a majority
- Turnout: 44.9%
	First party	Second party
Party	DAB	Neo Democrats
Last election	8 seats, 25.2%	3 seats,13.4%
Seats before	8	2
Seats won	5	3
Seat change	▼3	▲1
Popular vote	17,821	9,978
Percentage	28.4%	15.9%
Swing	▼3.2%	▲2.5%
	Third party	Fourth party
Party	BPA	Democratic
Last election	New party	1 seat, 11.7%
Seats before	2	1
Seats won	2	1
Seat change	Steady	Steady
Popular vote	4,624	6,580
Percentage	7.4%	10.5%
Swing	N/A	▼1.2%
- Colours on map indicate winning party for each constituency.

The 2015 Tai Po District Council election was held on 22 November 2015 to elect all 19 elected members to the 21-member Tai Po District Council.

== Overall election results ==
Before election: Change in composition:

↓
4	15
Pro-democracy	Pro-Beijing

Change in composition:

↓
6	13
Pro-democracy	Pro-Beijing

Tai Po Council election result 2015
Party	Seats	Gains	Losses	Net gain/loss	Seats %	Votes %	Votes	+/−
Independent	8	4	1	+3	42.1	32.8	20,589	
DAB	5	0	3	–3	26.3	28.4	17,821	+3.2
Neo Democrats	3	1	0	+1	15.8	15.9	9,978	+2.5
Democratic	1	0	0	0	5.3	10.5	6,580	−1.2
BPA	2	0	0	0	10.5	7.4	4,624	
Labour	0	0	1	–1	0	3.3	2,064	
FTU	0	0	0	0	0	1.8	1,122	
