= Lei Cheng Uk (constituency) =

- Elected constituency for the Sham Shui Po District Council
- Boundary of Lei Cheng Uk in Sham Shui Po District
- District: Sham Shui Po
- Legislative Council constituency: Kowloon West
- Population: 13,336 (2019)
- Electorate: 9,780 (2019)

Current constituency
- Created: 1994
- Number of members: One
- Member: Vacant

Lei Cheng Uk (Chinese: 李鄭屋) is one of the 25 constituencies in the Sham Shui Po District of Hong Kong which was created in 1994.

The constituency loosely covers Lei Cheng Uk Estate in Sham Shui Po with the estimated population of 13,336.

== Councillors represented ==
Election	Member	Party
1994	Fu Shu-wan	SSPRA
199?	Fu Shu-wan	DAB
2003	Kwun Sai-leung	ADPL
2011	Chan Keng-chau	KWND
2015	Kong Kwai-sang→Vacant	ADPL

== Election results ==
=== 2010s ===
Sham Shui Po District Council Election, 2019: Lei Cheng Uk
Party	Candidate	Votes	%	±%
ADPL	Kong Kwai-sang	4,127	61.26	+8.89
BPA	Chan Keng-chau	2,490	36.96	−10.67
Nonpartisan	Lam Ho-nam	120	1.78	
Majority		1,637	24.30	
Turnout		6,753	69.08	
ADPL hold		Swing		

Sham Shui Po District Council Election, 2015: Lei Cheng Uk
Party	Candidate	Votes	%	±%
ADPL	Kong Kwai-sang	2,335	52.37	+26.18
KWND	Chan Keng-chau	2,124	47.63	−9.96
Majority		211	4.74	
Turnout		4,459	48.12	
ADPL gain from KWND		Swing	+18.07	

Sham Shui Po District Council Election, 2011: Lei Cheng Uk
Party	Candidate	Votes	%	±%
KWND	Chan Keng-chau	2,436	57.59	
ADPL	Kong Kwai-sang	1,108	26.19	−29.30
People Power	Chin Wai-lok	686	16.22	
Majority		422	31.40	
Turnout		4,230	42.83	
KWND gain from ADPL		Swing		

=== 2000s ===
Sham Shui Po District Council Election, 2007: Lei Cheng Uk
Party	Candidate	Votes	%	±%
ADPL	Kwun Sai-leung	2,243	57.45	−1.34
Independent	Lui Kwan-chung	1,661	42.55	
Majority		582	14.90	
ADPL hold		Swing		

Sham Shui Po District Council Election, 2003: Lei Cheng Uk
Party	Candidate	Votes	%	±%
ADPL	Kwun Sai-leung	2,516	58.79	+22.05
DAB	Fu Shu-wan	1,764	41.21	−2.03
Majority		752	17.58	
ADPL gain from DAB		Swing	+12.04	

=== 1990s ===
Sham Shui Po District Council Election, 1999: Lei Cheng Uk
Party	Candidate	Votes	%	±%
DAB	Fu Shu-wan	1,834	43.24	
ADPL	Alfred Chan Yan-kam	1,558	36.74	
Democratic	Foo Wai-lok	849	20.02	
Majority		276	6.40	
DAB hold		Swing		

Sham Shui Po District Board Election, 1994: Lei Cheng Uk
Party	Candidate	Votes	%	±%
SSPRA	Fu Shu-wan	Uncontested		
[[SSPRA|Sham Shui Po Residents Association]] win (new seat)				
