= City Garden (constituency) =

Constituency in the Eastern District, Hong Kong

- Elected constituency for the Eastern District Council
- Boundary of City Garden in Eastern District
- District: Eastern
- Legislative Council constituency: Hong Kong Island East
- Population: 16,955 (2019)
- Electorate: 8,583 (2019)

Current constituency
- Created: 1994
- Number of members: One
- Member: Chau Hui-yan (Independent)

City Garden (Chinese: 城市花園) is one of the 35 constituencies in the Eastern District.

The constituency returns one district councillor to the Eastern District Council, with an election every four years. The seat is currently held by Chau Hui-yan.

City Garden has estimated population of 16,955.

== Councillors represented ==
Election	Member	Party	%
1994	Chan Chi-kuen	PDA	68.10
1999	Hui Ching-on	Independent	42.30
2003	Hui Ching-on	Independent	N/A
2007	Hui Ching-on	Independent	62.27
2011	Hui Ching-on	Independent	67.71
2015	Hui Ching-on	Independent	N/A
2019	Chau Hui-yan	Independent	47.13

== Election results ==
=== 2010s ===
Eastern District Council Election, 2019: City Garden
Party	Candidate	Votes	%	±%
Nonpartisan	Jocelyn Chau Hui-yan	2,806	47.13	
Independent	Hui Ching-on	2,557	42.95	
Independent	Ricky Fan Hai-tai	591	9.93	
Majority		249	4.18	
Turnout		5,964	69.51	
Nonpartisan gain from Independent		Swing		

Eastern District Council Election, 2015: City Garden
Party	Candidate	Votes	%	±%
Nonpartisan	Hui Ching-on	Uncontested		
Nonpartisan hold		Swing		

Eastern District Council Election, 2011: City Garden
Party	Candidate	Votes	%	±%
Nonpartisan	Hui Ching-on	2,160	67.71	+5.44
Civic	Fredie Hung Pak-cheung	1,030	32.29	−5.44
Majority		1,130	35.42	
Turnout		3,190	38.62	
Nonpartisan hold		Swing		

=== 2000s ===
Eastern District Council Election, 2007: City Garden
Party	Candidate	Votes	%	±%
Nonpartisan	Hui Ching-on	1,698	62.27	
Civic	Chan Ka-ming	1,029	37.73	
Majority		669	24.54	
Nonpartisan hold		Swing		

Eastern District Council Election, 2003: City Garden
Party	Candidate	Votes	%	±%
Nonpartisan	Hui Ching-on	Uncontested		
Nonpartisan hold		Swing		

=== 1990s ===
Eastern District Council Election, 1999: City Garden
Party	Candidate	Votes	%	±%
Nonpartisan	Hui Ching-on	995	42.30	
Democratic	Desmond Siu Kin-hang	896	38.10	
Nonpartisan	Chu Fung-chee	461	19.60	
Majority		99	4.20	
Nonpartisan gain from PDA		Swing		

Eastern District Board Election, 1994: City Garden
Party	Candidate	Votes	%	±%
PDA	Chan Chi-kuen	1,281	68.10	
Liberal	Chan Kwok-choi	333	17.70	
HKPA	Wong Kong-tin	267	14.19	
Majority		948	50.40	
PDA win (new seat)				
