= Fu Heng (constituency) =

- Elected constituency for the Tai Po District Council
- Boundary of Fu Heng in Tai Po District
- District: Tai Po
- Legislative Council constituency: New Territories North East
- Population: 15,546 (2019)
- Electorate: 11,913 (2019)

Current constituency
- Created: 1994
- Number of members: One
- Member: Ho Wai-lam (Independent)

Fu Heng (Chinese: 富亨) is one of the 19 constituencies in the Tai Po District of Hong Kong.

The constituency returns one district councillor to the Tai Po District Council, with an election every four years.

Fu Heng constituency has an estimated population of 15,546.

== Councillors represented ==
| Election | Member | Party |
|---|---|---|
| 1994 | Cheung Wing-fai | Democratic |
| 2003 | Yik Kin-hing | Democratic |
| 2007 | Wong Chau-pak | DAB |
| 2015 | Yam Man-chuen | Independent |
| 2019 | William Ho Wai-lam | Independent |

== Election results ==
=== 2010s ===
Tai Po District Council Election, 2019: Fu Heng
| Party | Candidate | Votes | % | ±% |
|---|---|---|---|---|
| Independent | William Ho Wai-lam | 3,435 | 41.41 | |
| DAB | Wu Cheuk-him | 2,700 | 32.55 | |
| Independent | Yam Man-chuen | 2,161 | 26.05 | |
| Majority | | 735 | 8.86 | |
| Turnout | | 8,306 | 69.77 | |
| Independent hold | | Swing | | |
