= Lam Tsuen Valley (constituency) =

Hong Kong constituency

- Elected constituency for the Tai Po District Council
- Boundary of Lam Tsuen Valley in Tai Po District
- District: Tai Po
- Legislative Council constituency: New Territories North East
- Population: 17,508 (2019)
- Electorate: 9,514 (2019)

Current constituency
- Created: 1994
- Number of members: One
- Member: Vacant

Lam Tsuen Valley (Chinese: 林村谷) is one of the 19 constituencies in the Tai Po District of Hong Kong.

The constituency returns one district councillor to the Tai Po District Council, with an election every four years.

Lam Tsuen Valley constituency has an estimated population of 17,508.

== Councillors represented ==
Election	Member	Party
1994	Cheung Hok-ming	DAB
1999	Chung Wai-keung	DAB
2003	Cheung Kwok-yiu	Independent
2007	Chan Cho-leung	Economic Synergy
2012	Chan Cho-leung	BPA
2019	Richard Chan Chun-chit→Vacant	TPDA→Independent

== Election results ==
=== 2010s ===
Tai Po District Council Election, 2019: Lam Tsuen Valley
Party	Candidate	Votes	%	±%
TPDA	Richard Chan Chun-chit	3,605	52.05	
BPA	Chan Cho-leung	3,321	47.95	
Majority		284	4.10	
Turnout		6,955	73.12	
TPDA gain from BPA		Swing		
