= 2019 Sai Kung District Council election =

Hong Kong local election

- 24 November 2019

29 (of the 31) seats to Sai Kung District Council 16 seats needed for a majority
- Turnout: 72.9% ▲26.2%
	First party	Second party	Third party
Party	Neo Democrats	Sai Kung Commons	TKO Pioneers
Last election	6 seats, 12.6%	New party	New party
Seats before	6	0	0
Seats won	9	3	2
Seat change	▲3	▲3	▲2
Popular vote	37,529	7,482	8,989
Percentage	18.8%	3.8%	4.5%
Swing	▲6.2%	N/A	N/A
	Fourth party	Fifth party	Sixth party
Party	TKO Shining	DAB	FTU
Last election	New party	8 seats, 18.7%	1 seat, 6.8%
Seats before	0	8	1
Seats won	1	0	0
Seat change	▲1	▼8	▼1
Popular vote	3,089	25,538	11,739
Percentage	1.6%	12.8%	5.9%
Swing	N/A	▼5.9%	▼0.9%
- Colours on map indicate winning party for each constituency.

The 2019 Sai Kung District Council election was held on 24 November 2019 to elect all 29 elected members to the 31-member Sai Kung District Council.

The pro-democrats scored a landslide victory by taking 26 of the 29 seats in the council, with Neo Democrats becoming the largest party. The pro-Beijing camp was almost completely wiped out from the council, except for the two ex-officio rural committee chairmen and the moderate councillors led by Christine Fong.

== Overall election results ==
Before election:

↓
9	20
Pro-democracy	Pro-Beijing

Change in composition:

↓
26	5
Pro-democracy	Pro-Beijing

Sai Kung District Council election result 2019
Party	Seats	Gains	Losses	Net gain/loss	Seats %	Votes %	Votes	+/−
Independent	14	8	4	+4	48.3	45.4	90,355	
Neo Democrats	9	6	0	+6	31.0	18.8	37,529	+6.2
DAB	0	0	8	−8	0.0	12.8	25,538	−5.9
FTU	0	0	1	−1	3.4	5.9	11,739	−0.9
NPP	0	0	2	−2	0.0	4.9	9,742	−4.2
TKO Pioneers	0	1	0	+1	3.4	4.5	8,989	
Sai Kung Commons	0	3	0	+3	10.3	3.8	7,482	
TKO Shining	0	1	0	+1	3.4	1.6	3,089	
CGPLTKO	0	0	0	0	0.0	1.0	2,063	
Democratic	0	0	0	0	0.0	0.9	1,741	−9.6
Community Alliance	0	0	0	0	0	0.5	943	
