= 1999 Tai Po District Council election =

Hong Kong local election

- 28 November 1999

19 (of the 26) seats to Tai Po District Council 14 seats needed for a majority
- Turnout: 36.8%
	First party	Second party	Third party
Party	Democratic	DAB	HKPA
Last election	4 seats, 19.4%	2 seats, 14.1%	3 seats, 17.7%
Seats before	3	3	1
Seats won	5	4	1
Seat change	▲2	▲1	Steady
Popular vote	10,784	7,416	1,798
Percentage	28.5%	19.6%	4.8%
Swing	▲9.1%	▲5.5%	▼12.9%
- Colours on map indicate winning party for each constituency.

The 1999 Tai Po District Council election was held on 28 November 1999 to elect all 19 elected members to the 26-member District Council.

== Overall election results ==
Before election:

↓
4	13
Pro-democracy	Pro-Beijing

Change in composition:

↓
6	13
Pro-democracy	Pro-Beijing

Tai Po Council election result 1999
Party	Seats	Gains	Losses	Net gain/loss	Seats %	Votes %	Votes	+/−
Democratic	5	2	0	+2	26.3	31.5	18,012	+9.1
Independent	6	4	2	+2	31.6	17.2	9,840	
DAB	4	1	0	+1	21.1	19.6	7,416	+5.5
HKPA	1	0	0	0	5.3	4.8	1,798	−12.9
Liberal	0	0	3	−3	0	7.0	4,013	
