= 2011 Sai Kung District Council election =

Hong Kong local election

- 6 November 2011

24 (of the 29) seats to Sai Kung District Council 15 seats needed for a majority
- Turnout: 40.9%
	First party	Second party	Third party
Party	DAB	Neo Democrats	Civil Force
Last election	9 seats, 24.5%	New party	3 seats, 10.7%
Seats before	9	3	3
Seats won	7	4	3
Seat change	▼2	▲1	Steady
Popular vote	9,629	11,532	10,252
Percentage	14.1%	16.9%	15.0%
Swing	▼10.4%	N/A	▲4.3%
	Fourth party	Fifth party
Party	Democratic	FTU
Last election	4 seats, 18.1%	Did not run
Seats before	2	1
Seats won	2	2
Seat change	Steady	▲1
Popular vote	10,395	4,253
Percentage	15.2%	6.2%
Swing	▼2.9%	N/A
- Colours on map indicate winning party for each constituency.

The 2011 Sai Kung District Council election was held on 6 November 2011 to elect all 24 elected members to the 29-member District Council.

== Overall election results ==
Before election:

↓
8	15
Pro-democracy	Pro-Beijing

Change in composition:

↓
9	15
Pro-democracy	Pro-Beijing

Sai Kung District Council election result 2011
Party	Seats	Gains	Losses	Net gain/loss	Seats %	Votes %	Votes	+/−
Independent	2	1	0	+1	11.8	25.1	17,299	
Neo Democrats	4	1	0	+1	16.7	16.9	11,532	
Civil Force	3	0	0	0	12.5	15.0	10,252	+4.3
Democratic	2	1	1	0	8.3	15.2	10,395	−2.9
DAB	7	1	3	−2	29.2	14.1	9,629	−10.4
FTU	2	1	0	+1	8.3	6.2	4,253	
Liberal	0	0	0	0	0	2.2	1,503	−3.1
NPP	0	0	0	0	0	1.3	923	
People Power	0	0	0	0	0	0.3	192	
