= Peggy Wong =

Hong Kong politician

Peggy Wong Pik-kiu SBS MH JP (Chinese: 黃碧嬌; born 21 January 1965) is a Hong Kong politician and a member of the Democratic Alliance for the Betterment and Progress of Hong Kong (DAB). She is currently the district councillor for the Tai Po South constituency of the Tai Po District Council and a member of the team of Gary Chan, the current DAB chairman and Legislative Council member. She previously served as chairman of the Tai Po District Council and as councillor for the Kwong Fuk & Plover Cove constituency.

== Controversy ==
=== Wang Fuk Court Fire ===
The Wang Fuk Court owners' corporation hired Prestige Construction and Engineering Company to carry out the works, involving about HK$330 million, which was said to be the most expensive option among the proposed renovation plans. The corporation issued a lawyer's letter requiring each household to contribute HK$160,000 to HK$180,000, sparking controversy. According to the meeting minutes of the Wang Fuk Court owners' corporation, attendees of the corporation's 25th Annual General Meeting held in September 2024 included DAB district councillors Peggy Wong Pik-kiu and Mui Siu-fung, as well as BPA district councillor Lo Hiu-fung. The meeting included discussions regarding the renovation works.

DAB Tai Po South District Councillor Peggy Wong Pik-kiu served as an adviser to the owners' corporation during the promotion of the renovation plan. She also posted on social media supporting the proposal. Later, the original corporation was subjected to a recall by owners due to the renovation controversy. Wong further defended the original corporation and accused Winfield Cheung Wing-fai, who assisted in opposing the plan, of "spreading misleading claims."

After the Wang Fuk Court fire, the DAB issued a statement saying it had not taken part in the proposal tendering process and claimed that related accusations were untrue. Wong responded that she had ceased to be an adviser to the corporation after its reshuffle in September 2024 and that she had no knowledge of any subsequent maintenance matters of the estate. However, according to Scoop, the general meeting of Wang Fuk Court owners had approved the HK$330 million maintenance project back in January 2024. Wong stated that the entire tendering process was led by the Urban Renewal Authority's "Smart Tender" platform and that she had not participated in any decision-making. She further claimed that Wang Fuk Court did not fall within the Tai Po South constituency, but according to the Electoral Affairs Commission's constituency boundaries, the estate is in fact within the constituency. On the morning of November 30th, Peggy Wong went to the memorial site in Tai Po to express her condolences. When asked whether she, as a key promoter of the major renovation, should take responsibility or assist in following up, she did not respond at all and immediately entered the hall to sign the condolence book.
