= 2003 Tai Po District Council election =

Hong Kong local election

- 23 November 2003

19 (of the 26) seats to Tai Po District Council 14 seats needed for a majority
- Turnout: 45.8%
	First party	Second party
Party	Democratic	DAB
Last election	5 seats, 28.5%	4 seats, 19.6%
Seats before	5	4
Seats won	7	3
Seat change	▲2	▼1
Popular vote	18,012	15,717
Percentage	31.5%	27.5%
Swing	▲3.0%	▲7.9%
	Third party	Fourth party
Party	HKPA	Frontier
Last election	1 seat, 4.8%	Did not contest
Seats before	3	0
Seats won	2	1
Seat change	▼1	▲1
Popular vote	7,842	1,716
Percentage	13.7%	3.0%
Swing	▲8.9%	N/A
- Colours on map indicate winning party for each constituency.

The 2003 Tai Po District Council election was held on 23 November 2003 to elect all 19 elected members to the 26-member District Council.

== Overall election results ==
Before election:

↓
6	13
Pro-democracy	Pro-Beijing

Change in composition:

↓
9	10
Pro-democracy	Pro-Beijing

Tai Po Council election result 2003
Party	Seats	Gains	Losses	Net gain/loss	Seats %	Votes %	Votes	+/−
Democratic	7	2	0	+2	36.8	31.5	18,012	+3.0
DAB	3	1	2	−1	15.8	27.5	15,717	+7.9
Independent	6	0	0	0	31.6	17.2	9,840	
HKPA	2	0	1	−1	10.5	13.7	7,842	−8.9
Liberal	0	0	1	−1	0	7.0	4,013	
Frontier	1	1	0	+1	5.3	3.0	1,716	
