= 2007 Tai Po District Council election =

Hong Kong local election

- 18 November 2007

19 (of the 26) seats to Tai Po District Council 14 seats needed for a majority
- Turnout: 40.9%
	First party	Second party
Party	DAB	Democratic
Last election	3 seats, 27.5%	7 seats, 31.5%
Seats before	4	6
Seats won	7	4
Seat change	▲3	▼2
Popular vote	19,977	9,509
Percentage	38.2%	18.2%
Swing	▲10.7%	▼13.3%
- Colours on map indicate winning party for each constituency.

The 2007 Tai Po District Council election was held on 18 November 2007 to elect all 19 elected members to the 26-member District Council.

== Overall election results ==
Before election:

↓
8	11
Pro-democracy	Pro-Beijing

Change in composition:

↓
4	15
Pro-dem	Pro-Beijing

Tai Po Council election result 2007
Party	Seats	Gains	Losses	Net gain/loss	Seats %	Votes %	Votes	+/−
Independent	8	1	1	0	42.1	20.1	10,538	
DAB	7	3	0	+3	36.8	38.2	19,977	+10.7
Democratic	4	0	2	−2	21.1	18.2	9,509	−13.3
Civic	0	0	0	0	0	7.1	3,723	
Frontier	0	0	1	−1	0	4.1	2,163	
Liberal	0	0	0	0	0	2.7	1,432	
