= 2011 Tai Po District Council election =

Hong Kong local election

- 6 November 2011

19 (of the 24) seats to Tai Po District Council 13 seats needed for a majority
- Turnout: 40.8%
	First party	Second party	Third party
Party	DAB	Neo Democrats	Democratic
Last election	7 seats, 38.2%	New party	4 seats, 18.2%
Seats before	7	2	1
Seats won	8	2	1
Seat change	▲1	▼1	Steady
Popular vote	12,501	6,644	5,817
Percentage	25.2%	13.4%	11.7%
Swing	▼7.0%	N/A	▼6.5%
- Colours on map indicate winning party for each constituency.

The 2011 Tai Po District Council election was held on 6 November 2011 to elect all 19 elected members to the 24-member District Council.

== Overall election results ==
Before election:

↓
4	15
Pro-dem	Pro-Beijing

Change in composition:

↓
3	16
Pro-dem	Pro-Beijing

Tai Po Council election result 2011
Party	Seats	Gains	Losses	Net gain/loss	Seats %	Votes %	Votes	+/−
Independent	2	0	0	0	11.8	25.1	17,299	
DAB	8	1	0	+1	42.1	25.2	12,501	−7.0
Neo Democrats	2	0	1	–1	10.5	13.4	6,644	
Democratic	1	1	1	0	5.3	11.7	5,817	−6.5
Citizens' Radio	0	0	0	0	0	2.4	1,196	
Civic	0	0	0	0	0	1.8	880	−5.3
Liberal	0	0	0	0	0	1.3	634	−1.4
TPNDL	0	0	0	0	0	0.1	37	
