= Andrew Cheng =

Hong Kong politician

The Reverend Deacon Andrew Cheng Kar-foo
- 鄭家富
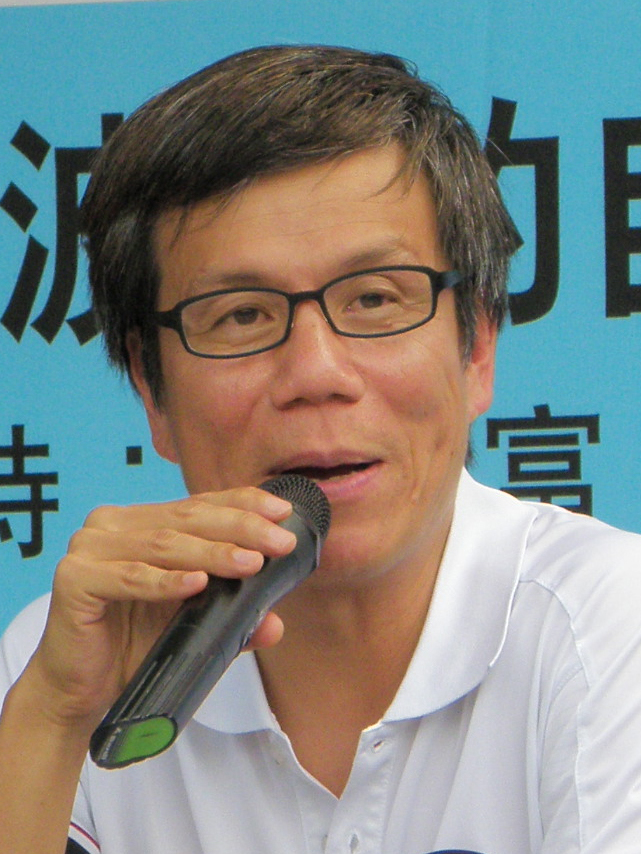
- Cheng attended a radio programme D100 in Mong Kok.

Member of the Legislative Council of Hong Kong
- In office 1 July 1998 – 30 September 2012
- Preceded by: New parliament
- Succeeded by: Fernando Cheung
- Constituency: New Territories East
- In office 11 October 1995 – 30 June 1997
- Preceded by: New constituency
- Succeeded by: Parliament abolished
- Constituency: Financial, Insurance, Real Estate and Business Services

Personal details
- Born: 28 April 1960 (age 66) Hong Kong
- Party: Independent
- Other political affiliations: Democratic Party (1994–2010); Meeting Point (until 1994)
- Spouse: Chan Kwai-ying
- Education: University of New South Wales
- Occupation: Roman Catholic Deacon; Solicitor
- Website: http://www.chengkarfoo.org

The Reverend Deacon Andrew Cheng
- Church: Catholic Church
- Archdiocese: Birmingham

Orders
- Ordination: 18 July 2026 by Bernard Longley

Andrew Cheng
- Traditional Chinese: 鄭家富
Transcriptions
Yue: Cantonese
- Yale Romanization: Jihng Gā fu
- Jyutping: Zeng^{6} Gaa^{1} fu^{3}

Andrew Cheng Kar-foo (Chinese: 鄭家富) (born 28 April 1960 in Hong Kong) is a Roman Catholic deacon, Hong Kong former politician and solicitor. He is a former Democratic Party member of the Legislative Council of Hong Kong representing the New Territories East geographical constituency.

== Biography ==
He was a founder member of the Democratic Party, previously a member of the Meeting Point. He was a member of Southern District Council (representing Ap Lei Chau Estate) between 1994–99 and of Tai Po District Council (representing Tai Po Central) from 1999 to 2011.

Cheng was first elected to the Legislative Council in 1995 representing the Financial, Insurance, Real Estate and Business Services constituency but left the council when it was replaced by the Provisional Legislative Council in July 1997.

He was elected to represent the New Territories East constituency in 1998 and won re-election in 2000, 2004 and 2008.

He subsequently decided to vote against the proposals, and announced in his Legco speech that he would quit the party because "small, but critical differences of opinion" prevented him from fulfilling his election pledge to strive for universal suffrage in 2012.

Cheng stood down at the 2012 election, in which he supported several pan-democratic candidates in New Territories East. He helped Gary Fan, who stood second in his list in previous elections and also quit the Democratic Party owing to disagreement over the 2010 electoral reform proposals, of Neo Democrats to win a seat in the constituency. He joined D100 as a radio host after retiring from the Legislative Council.

Although once denied rejoining electoral politics, Cheng changed his mind and contested the 2016 legislative election in New Territories East. He lost the bid with only 3.08% support. Three of Neo Democrat's Shatin District Councillors defected from Gary Fan to Cheng on the election day; they were subsequently dismissed from the party for Fan's failure in re-election.

On 18 July 2026, Cheng was ordained Permanent Deacon by Archbishop Bernard Longley of Birmingham in St. Chad's Cathedral.

== Personal life ==
Cheng is married to Chan Kwai-ying, who is a cousin of his fellow Democrat Wong Sing-chi, and is a father of two.

Legislative Council of Hong Kong
New constituency	Member of Legislative Council; Representative for Financial, Insurance, Real Estate and Business Services; 1995–1997	Replaced by Provisional Legislative Council
New parliament	Member of Legislative Council; Representative for New Territories East; 1998–2012	Succeeded by Fernando Cheung
