= 2011 Hong Kong local elections =

- 6 November 2011

All Elected Constituencies 412 (of the 507) seats in all 18 Districts Councils
- Registered: 3,560,535 ▲8.03%
- Turnout: 1,202,544 (41.49%) ▲2.66pp
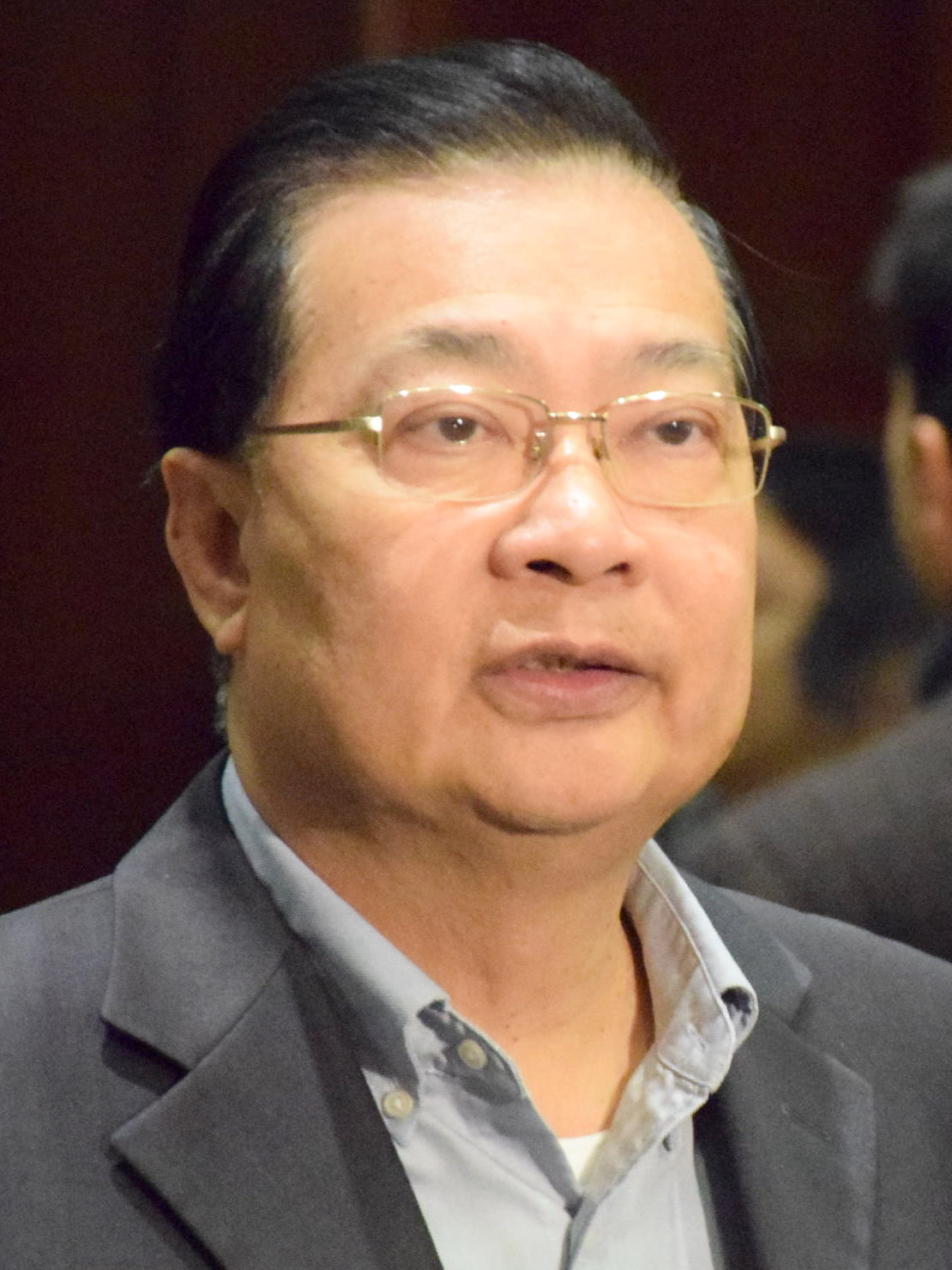

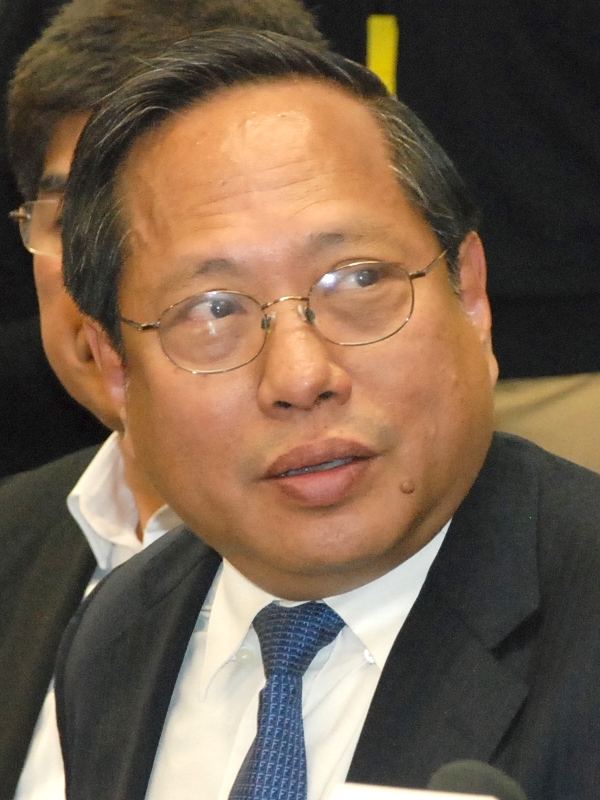

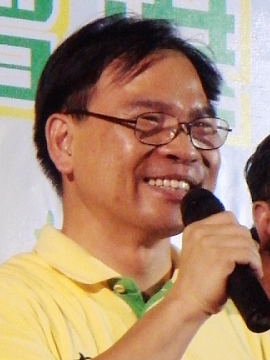

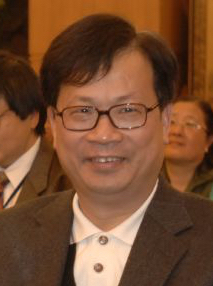

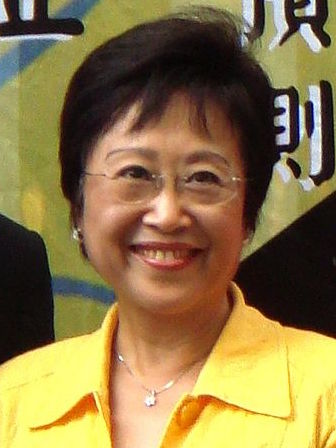

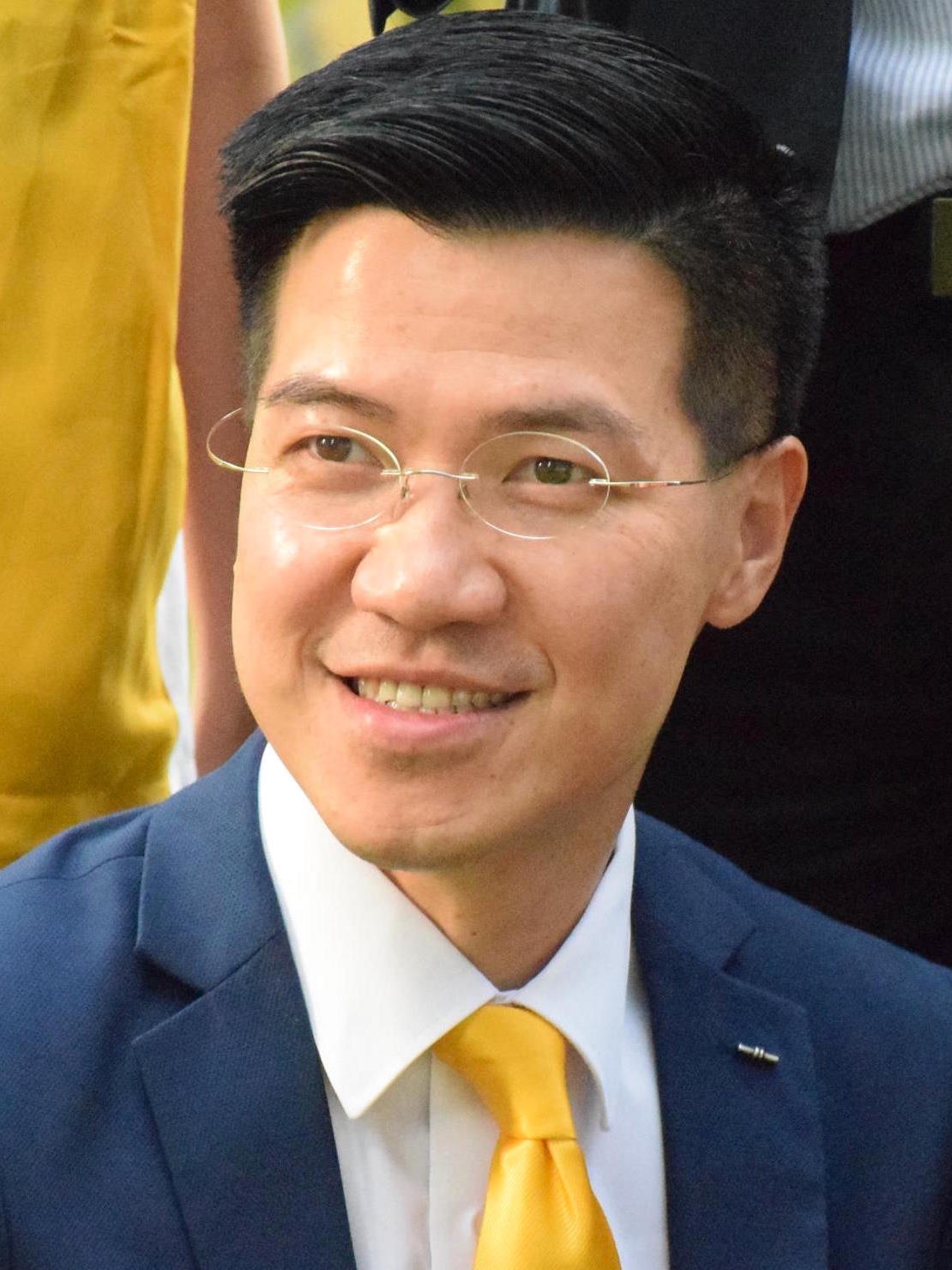

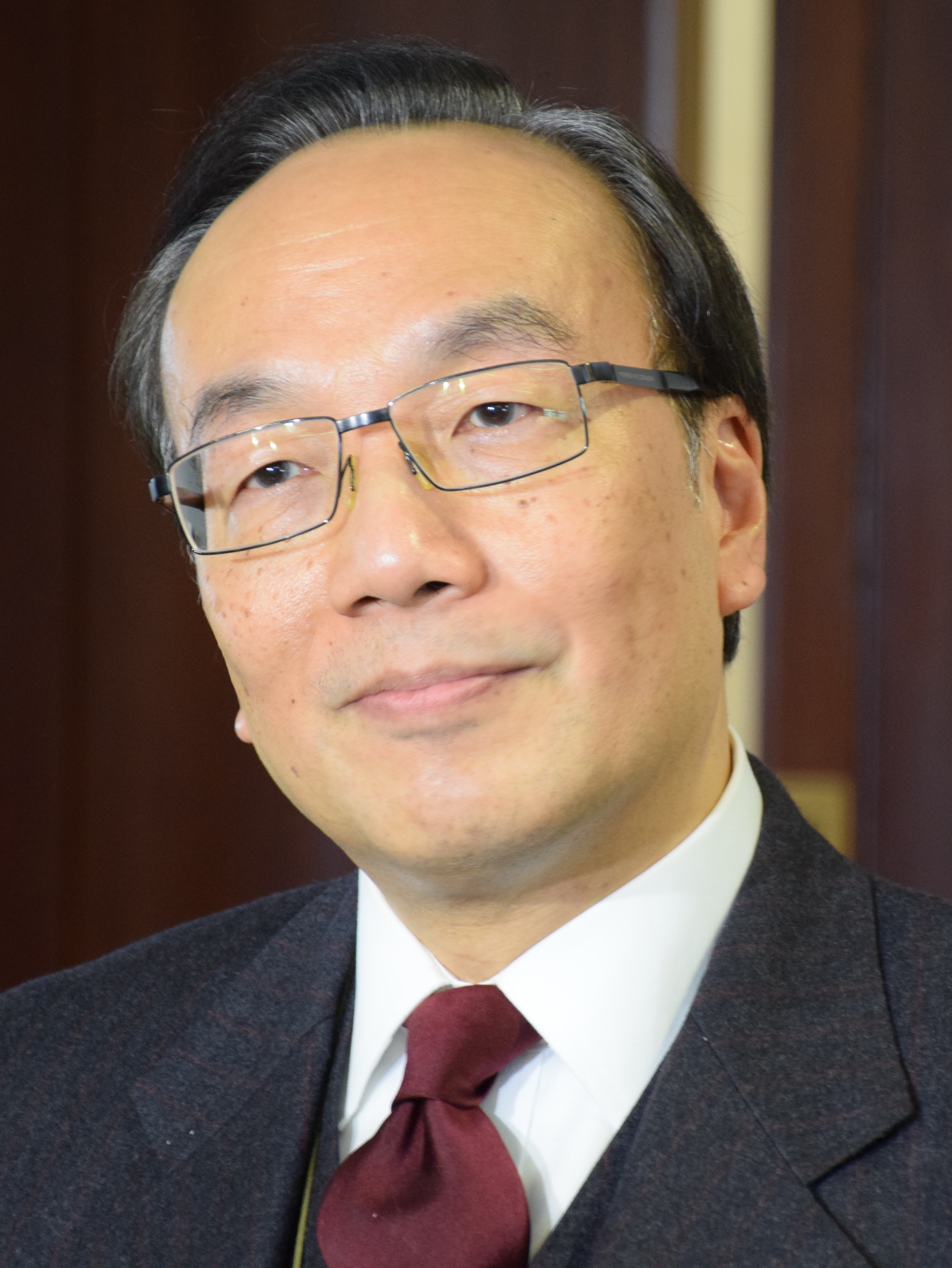

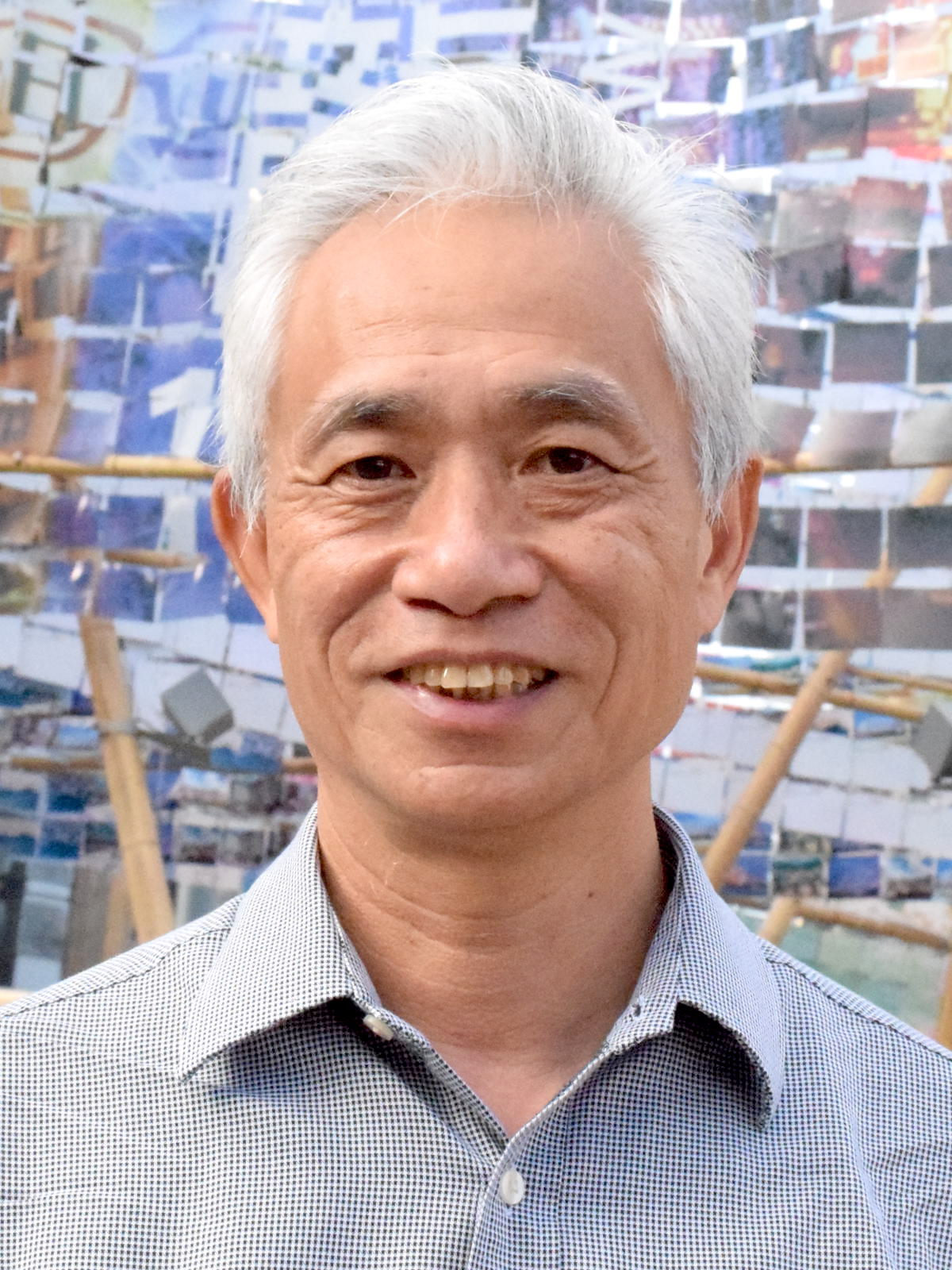
	First party	Second party	Third party
Leader	Tam Yiu-chung	Albert Ho	Bruce Liu
Party	DAB	Democratic	ADPL
Alliance	Pro-Beijing	Pan-democracy	Pan-democracy
Last election	115 seats, 25.73%	59 seats, 15.38%	17 seats, 4.60%
Seats won	136	47	15
Seat change	▲16	▼3	▼2
Popular vote	282,119	205,716	45,453
Percentage	23.89%	17.42%	3.85%
Swing	▼1.84pp	▲2.04pp	▼0.75pp
	Fourth party	Fifth party	Sixth party
Leader	Ho Hau-cheung	Cheng Yiu-tong	Miriam Lau
Party	Civil Force	FTU	Liberal
Alliance	Pro-Beijing	Pro-Beijing	Pro-Beijing
Last election	18 seats, 2.71%	1 seat, 0.37%	14 seats, 4.39%
Seats won	15	11	9
Seat change	▼3	▲7	▲3
Popular vote	35,221	36,646	23,408
Percentage	2.98%	3.10%	1.98%
Swing	▲0.27pp	▲2.73pp	▼2.41pp
	Seventh party	Eighth party	Ninth party
Leader	Gary Fan and others	Alan Leong	Leung Yiu-chung
Party	Neo Democrats	Civic	NWSC
Alliance	Pan-democracy	Pan-democracy	Pan-democracy
Last election	New party	8 seats, 4.29%	4 seats, 1.10%
Seats won	8	7	5
Seat change	Steady	▼5	▲2
Popular vote	25,437	47,603	14,364
Percentage	2.15%	4.03%	1.22%
Swing	N/A	▼0.26pp	▲0.11pp
- Map of the winning party by constituency

The 2011 Hong Kong District Council elections were held on 6 November 2011. Elections were held to all 18 District Councils of Hong Kong, returning 412 members from directly elected constituencies, each selecting a council member. After the government's constitutional reform package was passed in 2010, five new seats in the Legislative Council would be created in which the candidates would be nominated by all District Councillors.

The pro-Beijing camp continued its success in this election and controlled all 18 District Councils. The pro-Beijing flagship party Democratic Alliance for the Betterment and Progress of Hong Kong (DAB) remained the biggest winner by taking 136 seats, far ahead of the pan-democracy flagship party Democratic Party's 47 seats. The Democratic Party faced challenges from radical democratic party People Power which campaigned against the Democratic Party and Association for Democracy and People's Livelihood (ADPL) which supported the government's constitutional reform package in 2010. The People Power filled 62 candidates, most of them stood against the Democratic Party and ADPL candidates, including Democratic Party chairman Albert Ho and ADPL former chairman Frederick Fung.

Albert Ho and Frederick Fung were able to retain their seats, but other pan-democrat heavyweights who tried to gain seats in the District Councils in order to run in the new constituency in next year's Legislative Council election, including Tanya Chan, Ronny Tong and Lee Cheuk-yan, lost their bids to relatively unknown local councillors.

== Background ==
The pro-democracy camp had been urging for universal suffrage for decades. In 2005, a constitutional reform package was carried out by Donald Tsang, the Chief Executive. However, it was voted down by the pan-democrats as it did not state a clear timetable or road map to achieve an ultimate universal suffrage.

On 29 December 2007, the NPCSC (China's Standing Committee of the National People's Congress) announced that the Chief Executive and all members of Legislative Council may be selected by universal suffrage in 2017 and 2020 respectively. The statement by Beijing was unclear and it implied the term "universal suffrage" may be defined by the Central Government.

Afterward, Donald Tsang carried out another reform package in 2009. While the Civic Party and the League of Social Democrats councilors resigned from Legislative Council in order to launch a de facto referendum against the package and urging for real universal suffrage, their ally, the Democratic Party went for negotiation with the mainland officials and carried out a revised proposal. On 24–25 June 2010, the revised package was passed through the Legislative Council. It brought out a major split within the pan-democracy camp. A new radical party, People Power led by Wong Yuk-man and Albert Chan was announced to punish those who betrayal the cause of democracy. The People Power sent total number of 62 candidates into the election, most of them chose to contest with the Democratic Party and ADPL candidates.

According to the new reform package, general public are allowed to elect district council members into LegCo from the new five-seat district council functional constituency following their nomination within the councillors in the 2012 election. District councils election thus become a new battlefield for the new five seats of LegCo in which many heavyweights chose to run for a seat for the super seats of LegCo including Chan Yuen-han, Ronny Tong and Lee Cheuk-yan.

== Pre-election controversies ==
=== Political donations ===
Just one month before the election in October 2011, a leaked document revealed that Jimmy Lai, media mogul of Apple Daily has long been donating money to many supporters of democracy groups. For example, the Democratic Party received HK$13,690,000 from 2006 to 2010. While the Civic Party received HK$14,566,500 for the same period. Democracy supporter Catholic Cardinal Joseph Zen was also seen receiving more than HK$20 million, and the radical League of Social Democrats received HK$1 million last year. Former chief secretary Anson Chan received HK$1.3 million from 2007 to 2009. According to Sina.com Lai was said to have donated about $10 million to democracy camp groups in a 5-year span. The Wall Street Journal saw this as part of "a fresh campaign to accuse pro-democracy politicians of being stooges of foreign powers".

Since 2009–2010 the top four political parties received a total of $70 million in donations. Pro-establishment political groups are known to receive handsome political donations from many prominent Hong Kong businessmen. Out of that sum more than half ($48,370,000) went to the DAB. This amount was also 2.5 times more than the next pro-Beijing camp, Liberal Party as well as 7 times more than the sum received by pro-democracy camp groups like Civic Party and Democratic party. The DAB received eight times the amount as the Democratic Party in 2009–10.

However, there is a serious shortage of people donating to the democracy camp parties. Other than Lai, there seems to be nobody else in HK donating to the democracy camps any more. According to Emily Lau, first there is definitely a question of transparency with regards to who is donating money. There is also the issue of revealing donors. The WSJ believed that the taboo on discussing the activities of the Chinese Communist Party implies the Hong Kong government will never pass a law governing political parties. It added: "As a result, donor transparency will never be mandated." The Chinese Communist Party bans and punishes people once they know who is donating to democracy camps. In this election, the well-financed pro-Beijing parties swept the polls.

=== Foreign domestic workers right of abode issues ===
Right of abode for foreign domestic workers in HK became an election issue as the Civic Party was closely identified with the legal advisers who represented one such Filipina. The court case Vallejos v. Commissioner of Registration was one of the primary case in 2011. Pro-Beijing DAB argued that 125,000 workers were eligible, and would cause unemployment in Hong Kong to rise from 3.5% to between 7 and 10%. The Pan-Democrats, particularly the Civic Party, were disadvantaged by this as many HK residents fear granting Filipinos permanent residency will affect them.

== Results ==
A post-handover record of 1.2 million voters cast their ballots. The pro-Beijing DAB secured the most seats. Albert Ho held his seat, but many other pro-democracy camp heavyweights lost their seat including Tanya Chan, Ronny Tong and Lee Cheuk-yan. Democratic Party vice chairman Sin Chung-kai admitted that this was "a warning to the pro-democracy camp".

Summary of the 6 November 2011 District Councils of Hong Kong election results
Political Affiliation	Popular vote	%	%±	Standing	Elected	±
Democratic Alliance for the Betterment and Progress of Hong Kong	282,119	23.89	▼1.84	182	136	▲16
Civil Force	35,221	2.98	▲0.27	20	15	▼3
Hong Kong Federation of Trade Unions	36,646	3.10	▲2.73	20	11	▲7
Liberal Party	23,408	1.98	▼2.41	24	9	▲3
New People's Party	15,568	1.32	-	12	4	▲3
New Territories Association of Societies	2,187	0.19	-	2	2	▲1
Economic Synergy	2,404	0.20	-	3	1	▲1
Fu Cheong Estate Residents Association	2,235	0.19	-	1	1	▲1
Federation of Hong Kong and Kowloon Labour Unions	1,859	0.16	▲0.04	2	1	0
Pro-Beijing Independents	252,720	21.40	-	172	121	▼3
Total for pro-Beijing camp	654,368	55.42	▲1.77	438	301	▲23
Democratic Party	205,716	17.42	▲2.04	132	47	▼3
Hong Kong Association for Democracy and People's Livelihood	45,453	3.85	▼0.75	26	15	▼2
Neo Democrats	25,437	2.15	-	10	8	0
Civic Party	47,603	4.03	▼0.26	41	7	▼5
Neighbourhood and Worker's Service Centre	14,364	1.22	▲0.11	6	5	▲2
Hong Kong Confederation of Trade Unions	4,044	0.34	▲0.14	3	0	0
Power for Democracy	3,837	0.32	-	4	0	0
Individuals	23,007	1.95	▼2.33	14	6	▼1
Total for Democratic Coalition for DC Election	369,461	31.29	▼3.60	236	88	▼9
People Power	23,465	1.99	-	62	1	▼1
League of Social Democrats	21,833	1.85	▼0.66	28	0	▼5
Land Justice League	3,025	0.26	-	4	0	0
Citizens' Radio	1,718	0.15	-	2	0	0
Independent democrats and others	45,015	3.81	-	37	14	▼3
Total for pan-democracy camp	464,512	39.34	▲0.18	369	103	▼16
Independent and others	61,930	5.24	▼1.96	108	8	▲2
Total valid votes	1,180,809	100.0	-	915	412	▲7
Invalid votes	21,497					
Total (turnout 41.49%)	1,202,544					

=== Results by district ===
Council	Previous control	Previous party	Post-election control	Largest party	DAB	DP	CF	ADPL	FTU	Lib	Civ	Others	Pro-dem	Pro-Beijing	Appointed & ex officio	Composition	Details
Central & Western	Pro-Beijing	Democratic	Pro-Beijing	DAB	5	4				1		5	4	11	3		Details
Wan Chai	Pro-Beijing	DAB	Pro-Beijing	DAB	3							2	2	9	2		Details
Eastern	Pro-Beijing	DAB	Pro-Beijing	DAB	16	2			1	2	3	13	6	30	6		Details
Southern	Pro-Beijing	Democratic	Pro-Beijing	Democratic	2	5				1	1	8	6	11	3		Details
Yau Tsim Mong	Pro-Beijing	DAB	Pro-Beijing	DAB	8	1						8	2	15	3		Details
Sham Shui Po	NOC	ADPL	Pro-Beijing	ADPL	4			7				10	7	14	3		Details
Kowloon City	Pro-Beijing	DAB	Pro-Beijing	DAB	7	1		4		1		9	5	17	3		Details
Wong Tai Sin	Pro-Beijing	DAB	Pro-Beijing	DAB	9	3		2	1	1		9	9	16	4		Details
Kwun Tong	Pro-Beijing	DAB	Pro-Beijing	DAB	12	2			1			20	6	28	5		Details
Tsuen Wan	Pro-Beijing	DAB	Pro-Beijing	DAB	4	1			1		2	9	4	13	3+2		Details
Tuen Mun	Pro-Beijing	DAB	Pro-Beijing	DAB	12	7		2				8	9	20	5+1		Details
Yuen Long	Pro-Beijing	DAB	Pro-Beijing	DAB	7	3			2	2		17	5	26	5+6		Details
North	Pro-Beijing	DAB	Pro-Beijing	DAB (majority)	14	1						2	1	16	3+4		Details
Tai Po	Pro-Beijing	DAB	Pro-Beijing	DAB	8	1						10	3	16	3+2		Details
Sai Kung	Pro-Beijing	DAB	Pro-Beijing	DAB	7	2	3		2			10	9	15	3+2		Details
Sha Tin	Pro-Beijing	Civil Force	Pro-Beijing	Civil Force	9	5	12			1		11	8	28	6+1		Details
Kwai Tsing	Pro-Beijing	Democratic	Pro-Beijing	Democratic	5	9			2			13	15	13	5+1		Details
Islands	Pro-Beijing	DAB	Pro-Beijing	DAB	4				1		1	1	4	9	3+8		Details
TOTAL					136	47	15	15	11	9	7	168	102	307	95		

=== Vote summary ===
Votes, of total, by camp
1. Pro-Beijing (55.4%)
2. Pan-democrats (39.3%)
3. Other (5.24%)
Seats, of total, by camp
1. Pro-Beijing (73.1%)
2. Pan-democrats (25.0%)
3. Other (1.94%)

Popular vote
DAB	23.89%
Democratic	17.42%
Civic	4.03%
ADPL	3.85%
FTU	3.10%
Civil Force	2.98%
Neo Democrats	2.15%
People Power	1.99%
Liberal	1.98%
LSD	1.85%
NPP	1.32%
NWSC	1.22%
Others	34.22%

=== Seat summary ===
Seats
DAB	33.01%
Democratic	11.41%
ADPL	3.64%
Civil Force	3.64%
FTU	2.67%
Liberal	2.18%
Neo Democrats	1.94%
Civic	1.70%
NWSC	1.21%
Others	38.60%

== Post-election issues ==
Following the election, pan-democrats complained of irregularities in voter registration records, and a number of candidates who lost in marginal seats made allegations of electoral fraud to the police. The government was criticised for failing to address the issue back in 2006 after alleged instances where multiple voters had registered under a same address surfaced. In defence, Chief Secretary Stephen Lam said that the matter was "investigated thoroughly five years ago", and that "no evidence of vote rigging were found". The police received 16 such complaints in 2011.

Among the irregularities alleged was that almost 100 voters in Central used registered offices and hotels as their home addresses. Democratic Party candidate, Winfield Chong, who lost by 24 votes, said six buildings in the Sai Wan constituency used by approximately 120 voters to register were either being demolished or had been demolished; Yeung Sui-yin, who lost the Belcher seat by 33 votes, filed a complaint with the police, also alleging ballot rigging.

ADPL candidate Lam Kin-man, who lost King's Park constituency by two votes, took up his complaint with the ICAC. Lam alleged that, for example, five registered voters at one flat in the constituency where he was candidate all had different surnames; none of the voters registered at seven flats were present or past owners. two units said to have been used for storage purposes each had 10 registered voters. Following up on the allegations, the ICAC mounted "Operation Wave Spray", according to which 22 suspects were found to have "provided false information about their residential addresses to election officers"; six of them were charged.
