= 2019 Hong Kong local elections =

- 24 November 2019

All Elected Constituencies 452 (of the 479) seats in all Districts Councils
- Registered: 4,132,977 ▲11.89%
- Turnout: 2,943,842 (71.23%) ▲24.22pp
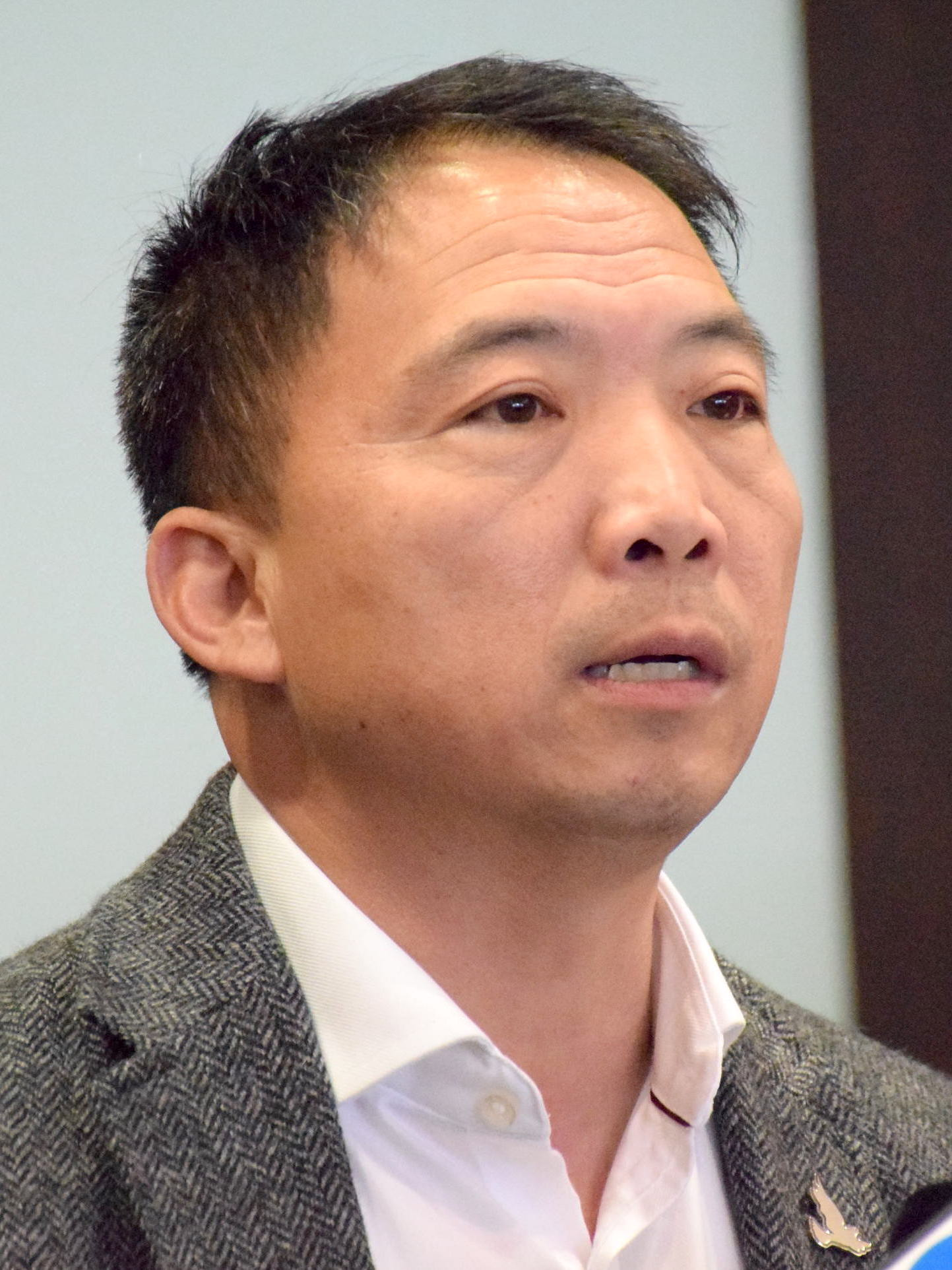

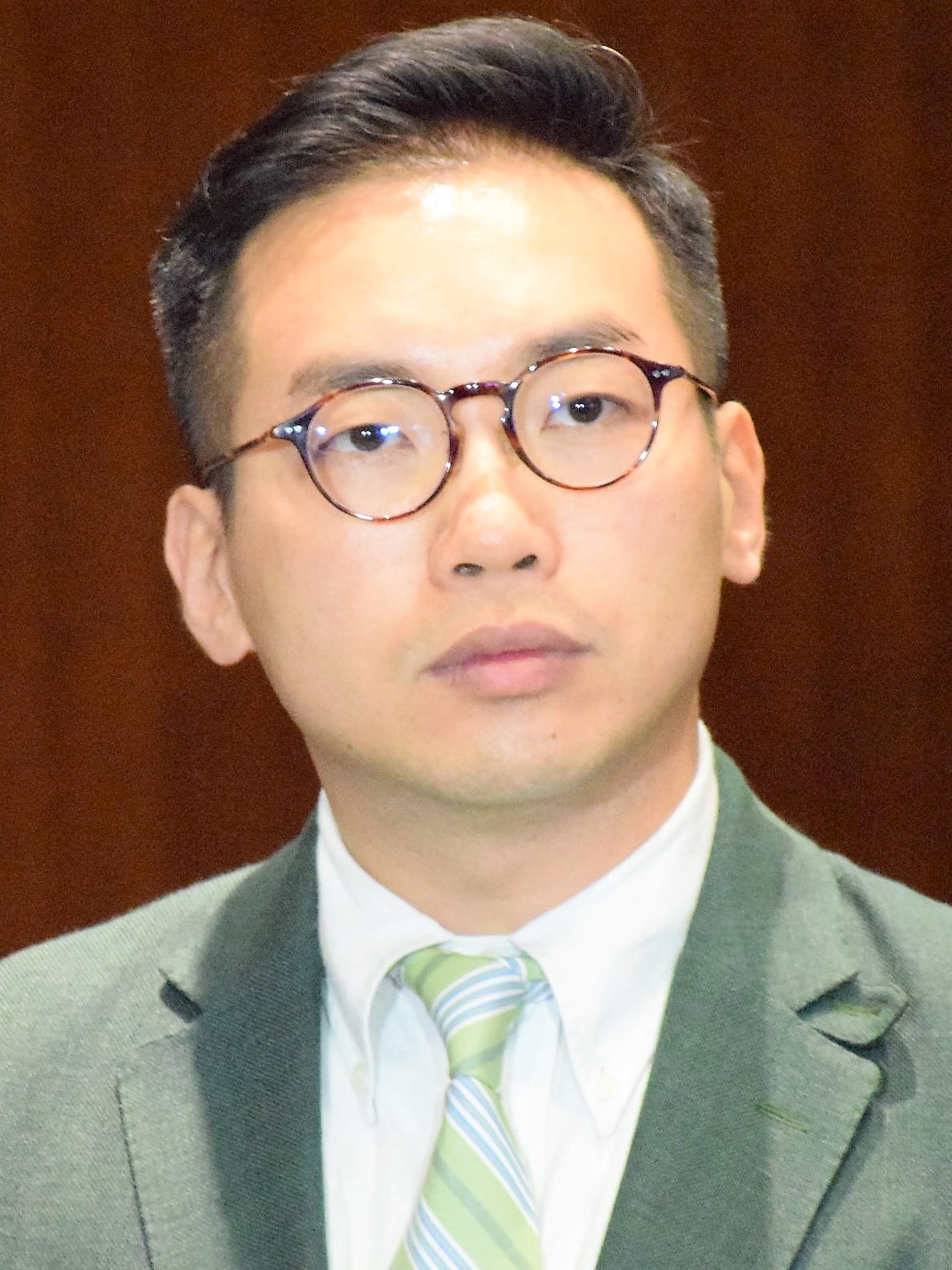

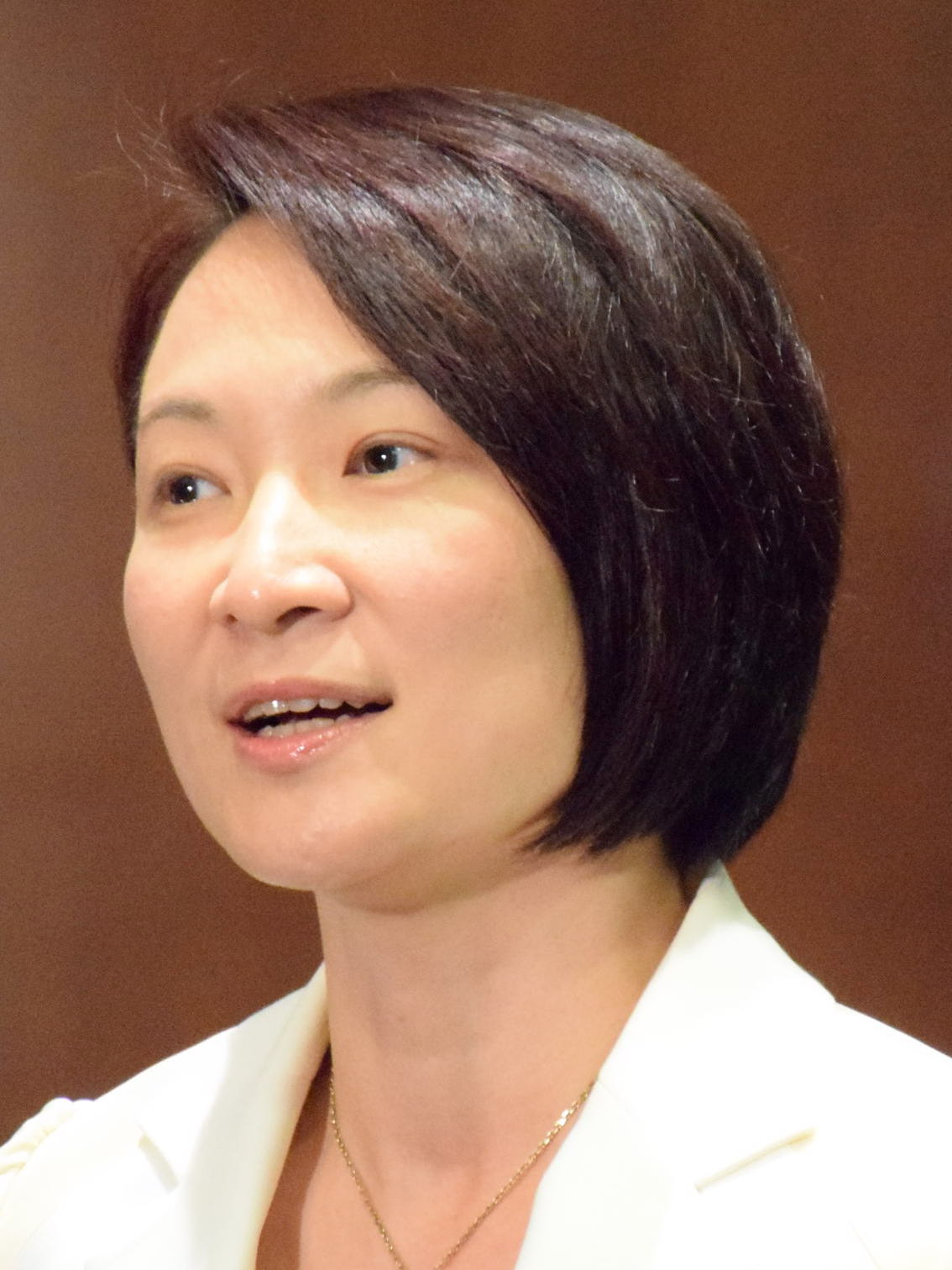

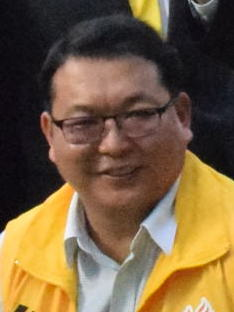

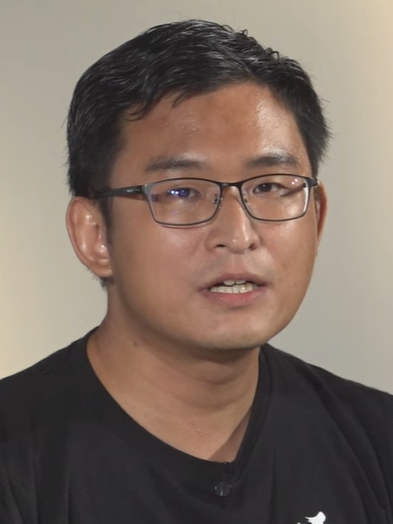

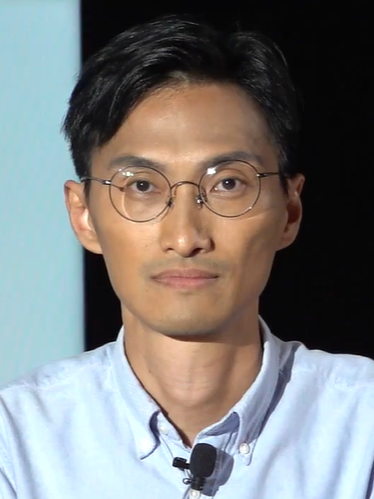

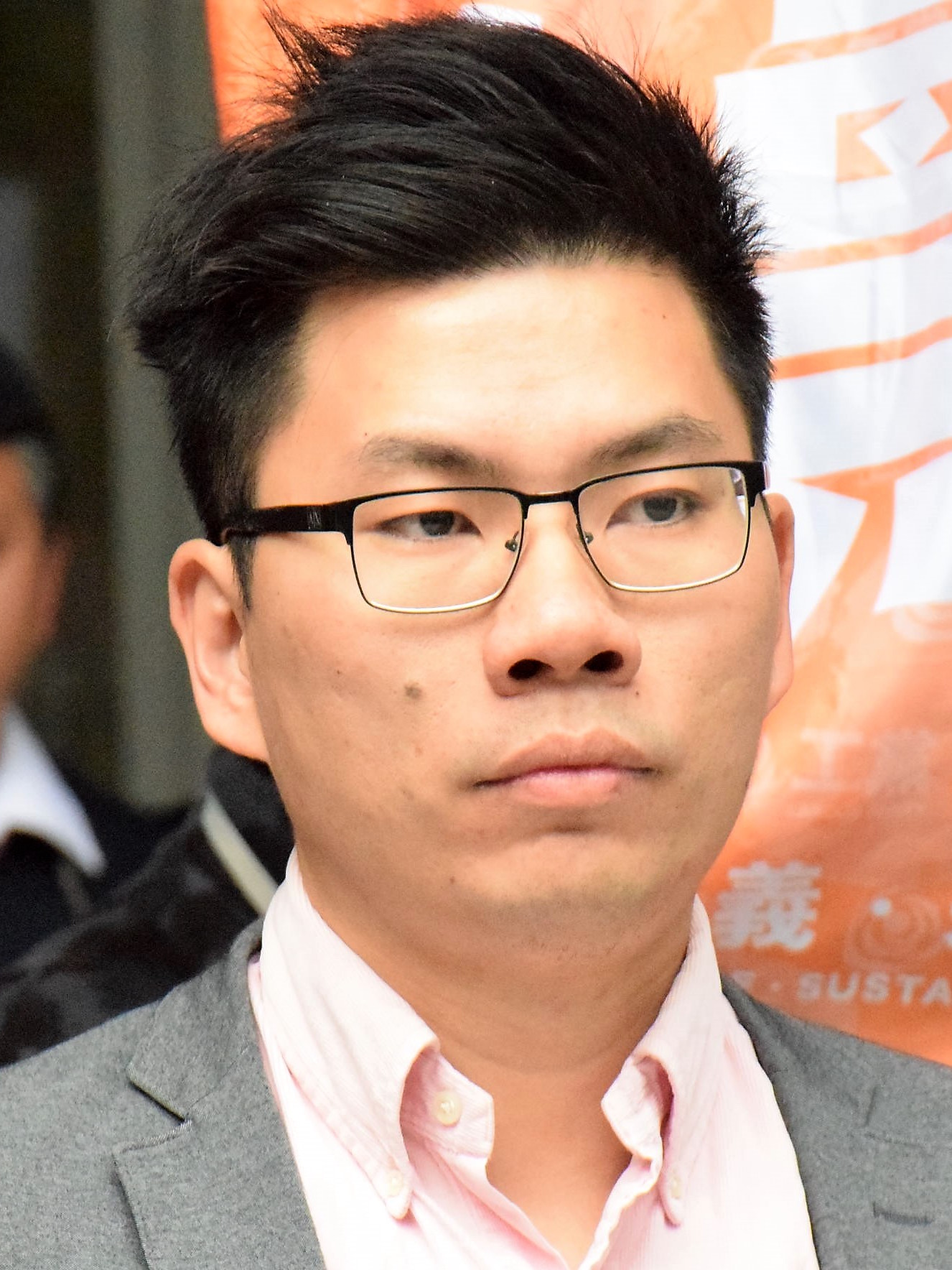

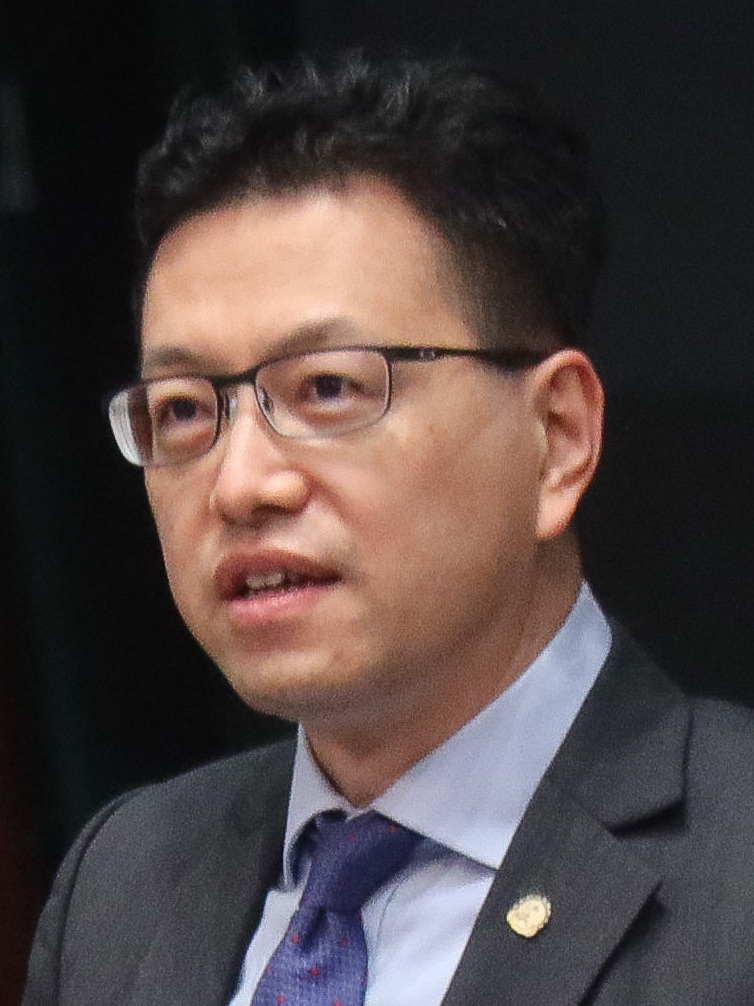

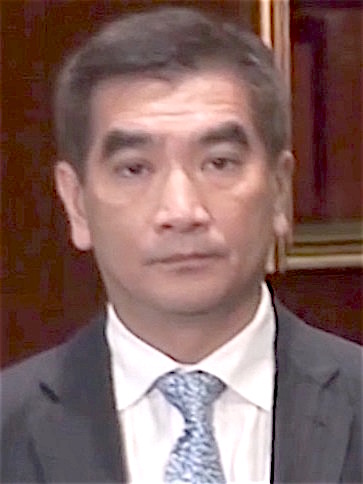
	First party	Second party	Third party
Leader	Wu Chi-wai	Alvin Yeung	Starry Lee
Party	Democratic	Civic	DAB
Alliance	Pro-democracy	Pro-democracy	Pro-Beijing
Last election	43 seats, 13.56%	10 seats, 3.62%	119 seats, 21.39%
Seats won	91	32	21
Seat change	▲54	▲20	▼96
Popular vote	362,275	141,713	492,042
Percentage	12.36%	4.83%	16.78%
Swing	▼1.20pp	▲1.21pp	▼4.61pp
	Fourth party	Fifth party	Sixth party
Leader	Yam Kai-bong and others	Sze Tak-loy	Eddie Chu
Party	Neo Democrats	ADPL	Team Chu
Alliance	Pro-democracy	Pro-democracy	Pro-democracy
Last election	15 seats, 2.92%	18 seats, 3.82%	New party
Seats won	19	19	7
Seat change	▲7	▲7	▲7
Popular vote	87,923	77,099	31,369
Percentage	3.00%	2.63%	1.07%
Swing	▲0.08pp	▼1.19pp	N/A
	Seventh party	Eighth party	Ninth party
Leader	Kwok Wing-kin	Ng Chau-pei	Felix Chung
Party	Labour	FTU	Liberal
Alliance	Pro-democracy	Pro-Beijing	Pro-Beijing
Last election	3 seats, 1.59%	27 seats, 6.11%	9 seats, 1.74%
Seats won	7	5	5
Seat change	▲4	▼21	▼3
Popular vote	28,036	128,796	27,684
Percentage	0.96%	4.39%	0.94%
Swing	▼0.60pp	▼1.72pp	▼0.80pp
- Map of the winning party by constituency

The 2019 Hong Kong District Council elections were held on 24 November 2019 for all 18 District Councils of Hong Kong. 452 seats from all directly elected constituencies, out of the 479 seats in total, were contested. Nearly three million people voted, equivalent to 71 per cent of registered voters, an unprecedented turnout in the electoral history of Hong Kong. The election was widely viewed as a de facto referendum on the concurrent anti-extradition protests.

All pro-Beijing parties suffered major setbacks and losses, including the flagship pro-Beijing party Democratic Alliance for the Betterment and Progress of Hong Kong (DAB), which received its largest defeat in history, losing 96 seats. Executive Councillor Regina Ip's New People's Party failed to obtain a single seat, and was ousted from all District Councils as a result. Dozens of prominent pro-Beijing heavyweights lost their campaigns for re-election, including Junius Ho, a controversial anti-protest figure who had expressed support for the triads behind the mob attack in Yuen Long on 21 July.

In contrast, the pro-democracy camp in conjunction with the localist camp achieved its biggest landslide victory in the history of Hong Kong, gaining absolute majority in votes and electoral seats in all of the 18 District Councils and tripling their seats from around 124 to about 388. The pro-Beijing parties could retain their control in only one District Council, due to their advantage in ex officio seats in the Islands District Council. Many pro-democracy candidates who actively participated in the protests were elected, including convenor of the Civil Human Rights Front (CHRF) Jimmy Sham.

This election is described by some as potentially the last free election in Hong Kong, as the national security law and election overhaul imposed by Beijing would vet democrats for the next election. More than 70 per cent of elected District Councillors resigned or were disqualified over the following two years due to various reasons.

== Boundary changes ==
In July 2017, following a review of the numbers of elected seats for each District Council having regard to local population forecasts, the Electoral Affairs Commission (EAC) proposed to create 21 new elected seats across 10 District Councils:

1. One new seat for each of Kowloon City, Yau Tsim Mong and Tsuen Wan District Councils;
2. Two new seats for each of Sham Shui Po, Kwai Tsing, Tuen Mun and Sai Kung District Councils;
3. Three new seats for each of Kwun Tong and Sha Tin District Councils; and
4. Four new seats for the Yuen Long District Council.

Accordingly, the total number of elected seats for the 2019 elections increased by 21 from 431 to 452.

=== Gerrymandering concerns ===
Some pro-democracy District Councillors accused the EAC of gerrymandering, stating that the borders of their constituencies were altered "unreasonably" to adversely affect their parties' election prospects. EAC chairman Barnabas Fung responded that the changes were based purely on an objective calculation. "Factors with political implications would definitely not be taken into consideration," Fung said.

== Background ==
=== Project Storm ===
In April 2017, Occupy Central co-founder Benny Tai proposed the "Project Storm" strategy to win the majority of the District Council seats for the pro-democrats in the coming election. He stated that by winning a majority of the some 400 District Council seats, the pro-democracy camp could gain an additional 117 seats of the District Council subsectors on the 1,200-member Election Committee which elects the Chief Executive. Tai believed that by making it harder for Beijing to manipulate the Chief Executive election, it would compel Beijing to restart the stalled political reform after its restrictive proposal was voted down in 2015 in the aftermath of the Occupy protests.

Power for Democracy, a group that coordinated different parties and groups in the pro-democracy camp, worked with pro-democrats to identify suitable candidates for all 452 constituencies. The group also held rounds of non-binding primaries to select a candidate if more than one pro-democrat was interested in running in the same constituency. However, the camp still risked doubling up in about 30 constituencies.

=== Anti-extradition bill protests ===
In mid 2019, the Carrie Lam administration pushed forward the Fugitive Offenders and Mutual Legal Assistance in Criminal Matters Legislation (Amendment) Bill 2019 to establish a mechanism that would allow the extradition of fugitives to any territory not covered by existing extradition treaties, including Taiwan, Mainland China and Macau. The proposal's purported purpose was to fill a legal loophole that allowed a Hong Kong suspect involved in a homicide case not to be extradited to Taiwan in 2018. The proposed bill raised grave concerns from various sectors of society, including lawyers, journalists, businesses, as well as foreign governments, who feared the heightened risk that Hong Kong citizens, dissidents, and foreign nationals passing through the city could be sent for trial without safeguards of the local courts to mainland Chinese courts under direct political control of the Communist Party.

Starting from June, rounds of demonstrations were attended by hundreds of thousands of people. The government first suspended the bill, and later proposed the withdrawal of the bill in September, which officially took place in October. The pro-Beijing parties, who were among the strongest advocates of the bill, worried that their support of the controversial bill as well as the abrupt U-turn would cost them votes in the upcoming District Council elections and the next year's Legislative Council election, risking a repeat of their devastating defeat in the 2003 District Council elections following the highly controversial national security legislation, which sparked massive protests across the city in 2003. There were also reports that the government was looking into the possibility of cancelling polls in areas where serious protests took place, or even postponing the elections altogether by invoking the Emergency Regulations Ordinance. The election was widely seen as a referendum on Lam's government and in particular an indication of the measure of support for the protesters.

=== Registration drive ===
Registration drives are uncommon in Hong Kong, but promotion from campaigners led tens of thousands of new voters to register during mass protests against the controversial extradition bill, pouncing on an opportunity to bolster the democratic opposition's prospects in the upcoming elections. Over 386,000 newly registered electors were counted, an election cycle record turnout since the handover of Hong Kong. The number of registered voters between the ages of 18 and 35 jumped by more than 12 per cent compared to 2018.

While the number of registered voters had been increasing steadily, large social movements and demonstrations have a tendency to galvanise registration. In 2004, 303,885 people had registered after half a million people took to the streets to protest against a government-proposed national security law criminalising "sedition", which was based on Article 23 of the Basic Law. In 2015, 262,633 people registered as voters after the 2014 Occupy protests.

According to the Registration and Electoral Office (REO) under the EAC, the number of registered voters in the final registers for 2019 was 4,132,977, a record high since the handover of Hong Kong.

== Nominations and disqualifications ==
An unprecedented 1,104 nomination forms were received by returning officers during the two-week nomination period from 4 to 17 October, although six nominees withdrew their candidatures before the end of the nomination period. It is the first time in Hong Kong's history that all 452 District Council seats were contested, compared to the previous elections in 2015 where 68 seats were left uncontested.

At least four candidates, including Tommy Cheung Sau-yin, Mo Kai-hong, Liu Qing of the Democratic Party, and Billy Chan Shiu-yeung of the Community Sha Tin movement received letters from returning officers asking them to explain what they meant when they said "Liberate Hong Kong, the revolution of our times", a popular slogan that was frequently used in the anti-extradition protests. Two other hopefuls also received letters asking for their stance on Hong Kong independence, including Demosistō secretary-general Joshua Wong, who planned to run for the South Horizons West constituency. Wong was asked if he was running on behalf of his party Demosistō and if he supported the notion of "self-determination" for Hong Kong. Agnes Chow, a member of Demosistō, was barred from running in the March 2018 Legislative Council by-election on the grounds that Demosistō advocated "self-determination".

Henry Wong Pak-yu, who aimed for a seat in the Tin Heng constituency, was also questioned for his previous public pro-independence statements. Both Wongs denied they supported the Hong Kong independence movement. Political scientist Ma Ngok warned that any disqualification would only fuel the flames of the ongoing political crisis. In light of the risk of being disqualified, Joshua Wong and at least 12 other pro-democracy candidates, including former student leader Lester Shum and pro-democracy legislator Eddie Chu, arranged for a backup candidate to stand in the same constituency before the nomination period ended, as their candidacy had not yet been confirmed by the Returning Officers. Chu was previously disqualified from running in the January rural representative election by Returning Officer Enoch Yuen Ka-lok, citing his stance of supporting "self-determination".

More than ten days after the nomination period, acting Returning Officer Laura Liang Aron, who replaced Dorothy Ma Chau Pui-fun who took indefinite sick leave, barred Joshua Wong from running due to political reasons, making Wong the only pro-democrat to be disqualified due to his political stance in the election. Aron issued a six-page ruling noting that Wong dropped his advocacy of the option of independence as "a compromise, instead of a genuine intention" as Wong referred to Chinese Communist Party general secretary Xi Jinping's remarks on separatism as a "stern threat" and reason for him and Demosistō to give up the advocacy of independence. Wong said the Returning Officer's decision showed that the central government was rigging the election, which was expected to be a key test of public sentiment about the protest movement. Kelvin Lam Ho-por, who stood in the same constituency, was widely believed to be Joshua Wong's substitute in case Wong was barred from running.

== Pre-election events ==
=== November protests and university sieges ===
Over a hundred pro-democracy candidates launched an election rally at Victoria Park on 2 November, citing the Elections (Corrupt and Illegal Conduct) Ordinance which allowed for election meetings to be held in public, following the police rejection of the organisers' initial demonstration application.

Soon after the assembly started, the police quickly declared the rally an unauthorised assembly and dispersed attendees using means such as tear gas, pepper spray, and water cannons. Three pro-democrat candidates, Osman Cheng Chung-hang, Richard Chan Chun-chit and Man Nim-chi, were seen being taken away by the police. During the operation, officers pepper-sprayed Chan to subdue him, prompting calls from rally-goers for his release. The protests continued with clashes emerging between the police and protesters, where protesters responded to the police crackdown by throwing petrol bombs, vandalising MTR stations and shops seen as sympathetic to the Beijing government, spraying graffiti on walls and building barricades on streets, and capping the 21st week of anti-government demonstrations.

The death of the 22-year-old university student Chow Tsz-lok inside a car park in Tseung Kwan O on 4 November further escalated the protests. Some protesters initiated a city-wide strike called "Dawn Action" on 11 November onward in which protesters established roadblocks and disrupted train services. In the 11 November morning in Sai Wan Ho, one 21-year-old protester in black was shot and fell on the ground unconscious once after approaching the policeman. The whole incident was recorded on stream and circulated quickly which sparked another round of anger among the protesters.

The protesters began to occupy major university campuses, and shut down main roads of the Tolo Highway and Cross-Harbour Tunnel next to the Chinese University of Hong Kong (CUHK) and the Hong Kong Polytechnic University (PolyU) respectively. The police responded heavy-handedly by storming into the CUHK campus, which sparked the widespread protests in various parts of Hong Kong in an attempt to divert the police's attention. At least 119 students were injured during the three-day siege where the police fired a record 2,330 canisters of tear gas that day all over Hong Kong, in particular at the Chinese University – the highest number in a single day since the protests began in June.

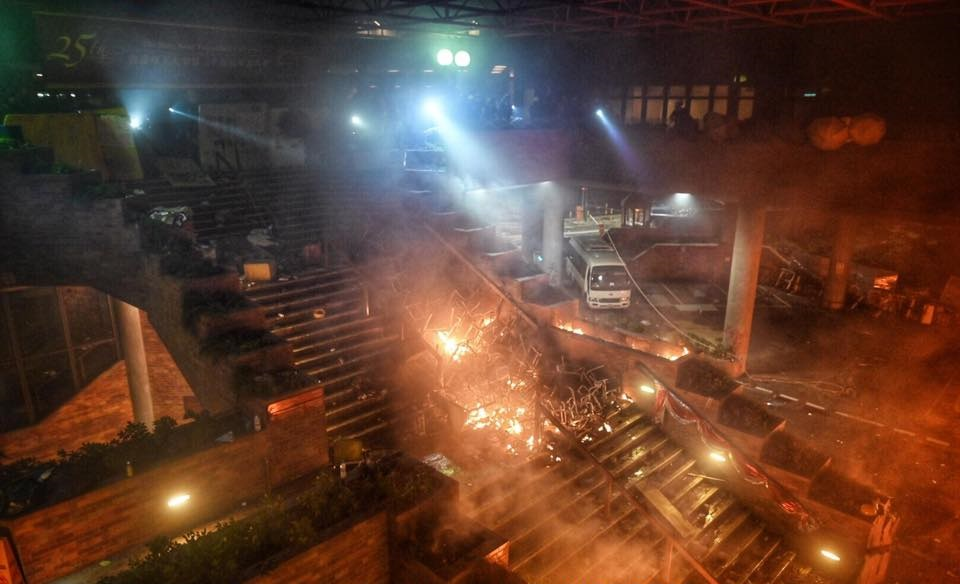
Protesters setting fire at the entrance of the campus to stop the police from advancing on 18 November.

The protests rose to all-time peak when the police began to besiege the PolyU campus on 17 November, locking down the campus at night by surrounding the main entrances to the university, and thoroughly searched everyone, including journalists, who wanted to leave. The police force issued a warning that anyone remaining on campus may be treated as taking part in a riot. Protesters called upon supporters to "rescue" more than 500 people who remained at PolyU and were unable to leave. Thousands of people gathered on main roads in Kowloon on 18 November in solidarity with those who remained trapped at PolyU. The protesters engaged in intense clashes with the police where the police officers shot 1,458 canisters of tear gas at protesters as well as 1,391 rubber bullets, 325 bean bag rounds, and 256 sponge grenades in a single day. On 29 November 2019, police said that the PolyU protests had resulted in 1,377 arrests.

=== Physical attacks on candidates ===
Both pro-democrat and pro-Beijing candidates were physically attacked in the run-up to the election. In late September, Stanley Ho Wai-hong of the Labour Party, who was running in the Pak Sha Wan constituency, was attacked by four men dressed in white that were carrying metal rods. He suffered severe head injuries and several fractures to both of his hands. On 16 October, Jimmy Sham, the convenor of the Civil Human Rights Front (CHRF) and the candidate for the Lek Yuen constituency, was hospitalised after being attacked on Arran Street in Mong Kok by at least four men wielding hammers and spanners. Pro-democracy candidates Jocelyn Chau Hui-yan and Jannelle Rosalynne Leung, who were running for the City Garden and Yuet Wah constituencies respectively, were also attacked by pro-Beijing men.

On 3 November, during a protest at Cityplaza, the Democratic Party's Andrew Chiu, defending his Tai Koo Shing West seat, was stabbed by a pro-Beijing Mandarin-speaking male with a knife when he tried to stop a fight after the attacker had already assaulted several people. His left ear was partially bitten off by the attacker, and he was forced to undergo ear re-attachment surgery in hospital, which was ultimately unsuccessful.

On the morning of 6 November, pro-Beijing Legislative Councillor Junius Ho was also stabbed by a man with a knife while campaigning for re-election to the Tuen Mun District Council in his Lok Tsui constituency. The attacker shouted abusive expletives at Ho, accusing him of being involved in the mob attacks in Yuen Long on 21 July. Ho was stabbed in the chest and was hospitalised. Ho's assistant and the attacker were also injured by the knife before the attacker was arrested.

== Fraud allegations ==
=== Alleged false claims of allegiance ===
There were several self-proclaimed pro-democrat candidates who were later found to be members of pro-Beijing groups and organisations, who contested the elections in the hope of snatching votes from legitimate pro-democracy candidates that were endorsed by the pro-democracy camp. For example, in the Tai Pat Tin East constituency, there was a minor candidate named Lau Hin-ming, who was ahead of the Democratic Party and Democratic Alliance for the Betterment and Progress of Hong Kong (DAB) candidates. Lau used the "Liberate Hong Kong, the revolution of our times" slogan in his electoral messages, but was eventually found to be a member of an executive committee belonging to the Federation of The Youth Power of Kwai Tsing, a sub-group of the pro-Beijing Federation of New Territories Youth.

Some voters were found to have no knowledge about the candidates that they have nominated. For example, in the Lei Cheng Uk constituency, candidate Lam Ho-nam was ahead of Kong Kwai-sang from the pro-democratic Association for Democracy and People's Livelihood (ADPL) and Chan Keng-chau from the pro-Beijing Business and Professionals Alliance for Hong Kong (BPA). However, a voter who nominated Lam claimed that he had never actually intended to nominate him. Instead, he signed an endorsement for Chan Keng-chau because he was a member of the Lei Cheng Uk Resident Association, while Chan has been the chairman of the association. Pro-democracy media sources allege that Chan had transferred the nomination to Lam, in the hope of decreasing the votes of Kong Kwai-sang, though no substantial proof was supplemented to this claim.

=== Jinan University's alleged misuse of personal information ===
Apple Daily reported that they had received complaints from the students of Jinan University (located in China), who were requested by academic staff and counsellors to vote for pro-Beijing candidates, with them being promised free transportation if they do so. University staff members were able to locate the constituencies in which the students resided.

=== Alleged illegal transportation for voters ===
Apple Daily also reported that Wong Yiu-chung, a pro-Beijing candidate from the BPA who was contesting the election for the Wah Lai constituency, had offered free coach rides to voters as an incentive to vote for him. The coaches were adorned with posters of Wong, and potentially constitutes an illegal election-related expense.

Stand News reported that in the Fu Tai constituency, there were alleged voluntary coach services offered to elderly voters by pro-Beijing parties. Some voters reported the services were offered by Manwell Chan, a pro-Beijing Hong Kong Federation of Trade Unions (FTU) candidate, and also stated that they were asked to vote for Chan in exchange for said ride, though no tangible proof could be found to support this claim.

== Results ==
Election results map by margin of votes between pro-democracy and pro-Beijing camps.

Control of the District Councils after the election.

The elections to the District Councils of Hong Kong were held during the weekend, in which for the first time since the protests began, no outbreaks of violence were reported. As the District Councils are the only governmental body chosen by full universal suffrage, the election was widely described as a proxy referendum over the protest movement's demands. 2.94 million out of 4.13 million registered voters turned out to vote, including many first-time voters, representing a record turnout of over 71 per cent. The turnout was significant and some waited in line for more than an hour to cast their votes.

More than 250 seats were flipped as the pro-democrats achieved their biggest victory in Hong Kong's history, gaining absolute majority in votes and electoral seats in all of the 18 District Councils of Hong Kong, tripling their number of seats from about 124 to around 388, and also gained the majority to capture 117 seats in the District Council subsectors of the next Election Committee, which is vested with the power to elect the Chief Executive of Hong Kong. The pro-democracy camp's landslide victory seemingly disproved earlier claims by pro-Beijing politicians that they held the support of a "silent majority" of Hong Kongers.

Parties belonging to the pro-Beijing camp and independents won 62 seats in the District Councils, with a loss of 242 seats. The main pro-Beijing party, Democratic Alliance for the Betterment and Progress of Hong Kong (DAB), received its largest defeat in history, losing nearly a hundred seats, while Regina Ip's New People's Party was eliminated from the District Councils. While DAB chairwoman Starry Lee narrowly managed to fend off her main pro-democracy challenger Leung Kwok-hung, several of her fellow pro-Beijing legislators, Junius Ho, Horace Cheung, Michael Tien, Holden Chow, Lau Kwok-fan, Luk Chung-hung and Alice Mak, were ousted by relatively unknown new faces.

Many pro-democrats who actively participated in the protests also scored victories. Jimmy Sham, convenor of the Civil Human Rights Front, which organised June's million-strong peaceful marches, won a seat in Lek Yuen. Andrew Chiu of the Democratic Party, was re-elected in Tai Koo Shing West, while Jocelyn Chau, aged 23, who was also arrested on the campaign trail, defeated long-time pro-Beijing incumbent Hui Ching-on in City Garden. Richard Chan, dubbed as "airport uncle" by the press, who was pepper-sprayed in the face by riot police during the election rally held on 2 November and later arrested while campaigning, won his seat in the Lam Tsuen Valley constituency in Tai Po.

Other prominent pro-democratic activists, including Tommy Cheung Sau-yin, a former student leader who was among the nine Occupy activists convicted for public nuisance earlier that year for his part in the 2014 Umbrella Revolution, defeated incumbent Wilson Wong Wai-shun, who was seen with the attackers in Yuen Lung during the mob attack on 21 July. Another former student leader, Lester Shum, known for his involvements in the Umbrella Revolution, won in the Hoi Bun constituency in Tsuen Wan. Kelvin Lam, Joshua Wong's last-minute substitute after he was barred from running, won a seat in South Horizons West.

=== Overview of outcome ===

Before election:

↓
124	331
Pro-democracy	Pro-Beijing

Change in composition:

↓
388
Pro-democracy

89
Pro-Beijing

Summary of the 24 November 2019 District Councils of Hong Kong election results
Political Affiliation	Popular vote	%	% ±	Standing	Elected	±
Democratic Party	362,275	12.36	▼1.20	99	91	▲54
Civic Party	141,713	4.83	▲1.21	36	32	▲20
Neo Democrats	87,923	3.00	▲0.08	20	19	▲7
Hong Kong Association for Democracy and People's Livelihood	77,099	2.63	▼1.19	21	19	▲7
Power for Democracy	69,764	2.38	▲2.11	22	17	▲13
Team Chu Hoi Dick of New Territories West	31,369	1.07	-	9	7	▲7
Labour Party	28,036	0.96	▼0.60	7	7	▲4
Community Sha Tin	25,509	0.87	-	6	5	▲1
Tuen Mun Community Network	20,086	0.69	-	5	4	▲4
Community Alliance	17,635	0.60	-	5	4	▲3
Neighbourhood and Worker's Service Centre	16,176	0.55	▼0.56	4	4	▲2
Tin Shui Wai Connection	15,998	0.55	-	4	4	▲4
Civic Passion	14,326	0.49	▲0.28	5	2	▲2
Tai Po Democratic Alliance	13,185	0.45	-	4	4	▲4
Community March	12,100	0.41	-	5	5	▲5
Tsz Wan Shan Constructive Power	10,160	0.35	-	2	2	▲2
Democratic Alliance	9,886	0.34	▼0.03	3	2	▲1
Deliberation Tsuen Wan	9,516	0.32	-	3	2	▲1
Action 18	9,006	0.31	-	3	2	▲2
Tseung Kwan O Pioneers	8,989	0.31	-	2	2	▲2
League of Social Democrats	8,384	0.29	▼0.16	3	2	▲2
Sai Kung Commons	4,677	0.16	-	2	2	▲2
People Power	8,149	0.28	-	2	1	▲1
Empowering Hong Kong	5,590	0.19	-	1	1	▲1
Fu Sun Generation	5,486	0.19	-	1	1	▲1
HTTH Environmental Concern Group	5,389	0.18	-	1	1	▲1
North District Blueprint	5,288	0.18	-	1	1	▲1
Tsing Yi People	4,727	0.16	-	1	1	▲1
Sha Tin Community Vision	4,691	0.16	-	1	1	▲1
Luen Wo United	4,491	0.15	-	1	1	▲1
Lung Mun Concern Group	4,410	0.15	-	1	1	▲1
Cheung Sha Wan West Front	4,281	0.15	-	1	1	▲1
Shau Kei Wan East Future	4,204	0.14	-	1	1	▲1
Choi Hung Estate Social Service Association	3,523	0.12	-	1	1	▲1
Cheung Sha Wan Community Establishment Power	3,359	0.11	-	1	1	▲1
Unity of San Hui	3,276	0.11	-	1	1	▲1
Tseung Kwan O Shining	3,089	0.11	-	1	1	▲1
Tsuen Wan Community Network	2,788	0.10	▲0.01	1	1	▲1
Victoria Social Association	2,640	0.09	-	2	1	▲1
Independent democrats and others	604,890	20.63	-	226	133	▲100
Total for pro-democracy camp	1,674,083	57.10	▲16.90	515	388	▲265
Democratic Alliance for the Betterment and Progress of Hong Kong	492,042	16.78	▼4.61	181	21	▼96
Hong Kong Federation of Trade Unions	128,796	4.39	▼1.72	43	5	▼21
New People's Party	79,975	2.73	▼2.51	28	0	▼13
Business and Professionals Alliance for Hong Kong	66,504	2.27	▲0.37	25	3	▼16
Liberal Party	27,684	0.94	▼0.80	11	5	▼3
Roundtable	26,055	0.89	-	12	2	▼5
Federation of Public Housing Estates	19,495	0.66	▲0.42	7	3	▲1
Civil Force	7,164	0.24	-	3	0	▼2
Kowloon West New Dynamic	3,052	0.10	▼0.71	2	0	0
Federation of Hong Kong and Kowloon Labour Unions	1,734	0.06	▼0.16	1	0	▼1
Pro-Beijing Independents	380,529	12.98	▼3.70	185	23	▼85
Total for pro-Beijing camp	1,233,030	42.06	▼12.55	498	62	▼242
Non-aligned independents and others	24,623	0.83	-	77	2	▼1
Total	2,931,745	100.00	-	1,090	452	▲21
Total valid votes	2,931,745	99.59	-	Elected	452	-
Invalid votes	12,097	0.41	-	Ex officio	27	-
Total votes / turnout	2,943,842	71.23	▲24.22	Total	479	-
Registered voters	4,132,977	100.00	▲11.89			

=== Results by district ===
Council	Previous control	Previous party	Post-election control	Largest party	DP	Civ	DAB	ND	ADPL	Lab	FTU	Lib	Others	Pro-dem	Pro-Beijing	Ex-officio	Composition	Details
Central & Western	Pro-Beijing	Tied	Pro-democracy	Democratic	7							1	7	14	1	—N/a		Details
Wan Chai	Pro-Beijing	DAB	Pro-democracy	Liberal								1	12	9	4	—N/a		Details
Eastern	Pro-Beijing	DAB	Pro-democracy	Civic	4	5	1			2	1	1	21	32	3	—N/a		Details
Southern	Pro-Beijing	Democratic	Pro-democracy	Democratic	7	1						1	8	15	2	—N/a		Details
Yau Tsim Mong	Pro-Beijing	DAB	Pro-democracy	Community March	4	1	1						14	17	3	—N/a		Details
Sham Shui Po	NOC	ADPL	Pro-democracy	ADPL	2	4	2		11				6	22	2	—N/a		Details
Kowloon City	Pro-Beijing	DAB	Pro-democracy	Democratic	10		4					1	10	15	10	—N/a		Details
Wong Tai Sin	Pro-Beijing	DAB	Pro-democracy	Democratic	6	2			3				14	25	0	—N/a		Details
Kwun Tong	Pro-Beijing	DAB	Pro-democracy	Democratic	9	4	6				1		20	28	12	—N/a		Details
Tsuen Wan	Pro-Beijing	DAB	Pro-democracy	Civic	3	3		2		1	1		9	16	2	2		Details
Tuen Mun	Pro-Beijing	DAB	Pro-democracy	Democratic	8		1		5	2	1		15	28	3	1		Details
Yuen Long	Pro-Beijing	DAB	Pro-democracy	Democratic	7								32	33	6	6		Details
North	Pro-Beijing	DAB	Pro-democracy	Democratic	5		1	3			1		9	15	3	4		Details
Tai Po	Pro-Beijing	DAB	Pro-democracy	Neo Democrats				4					15	19	0	2		Details
Sai Kung	Pro-Beijing	DAB	Pro-democracy	Neo Democrats				9		1			19	26	3	2		Details
Sha Tin	Pro-Beijing	NPP/CF	Pro-democracy	Civic	6	7	1	1		1			25	40	1	1		Details
Kwai Tsing	Pro-Beijing	DAB	Pro-democracy	Democratic	12	3	3						13	27	4	1		Details
Islands	Pro-Beijing	DAB	Pro-Beijing	Civic	1	2	1						6	7	3	8		Details
TOTAL					91	32	21	19	19	7	5	5	253	388	62	27		

=== Vote summary ===
Votes, of total, by camp
1. Pro-democrats (57.1%)
2. Pro-Beijing (42.1%)
3. Non-aligned others (0.83%)
Seats, of total, by camp
1. Pro-democrats (81.0%)
2. Pro-Beijing (18.6%)
3. Non-aligned others (0.42%)

Popular vote
DAB	16.78%
Democratic	12.36%
Civic	4.83%
FTU	4.39%
Neo Democrats	3.00%
NPP	2.73%
ADPL	2.63%
BPA	2.27%
Labour	0.96%
Liberal	0.94%

=== Seat summary ===
Percentage of seats
Democratic	20.13%
Civic	7.08%
DAB	4.65%
Neo Democrats	4.20%
ADPL	4.20%
Labour	1.55%
FTU	1.11%
Liberal	1.11%
BPA	0.66%
NPP	0.00%

== Aftermath ==
Following the publication of the election results, DAB chairwoman Starry Lee submitted her resignation in light of the election results, but her resignation offer was rejected by the DAB's Central Committee, which stated they wanted Lee to stay and lead the party forward to face the coming challenges ahead of them. HKFTU legislator Alice Mak, who was unseated in her Wai Ying constituency, insisted that their electoral hammering was not their fault, instead blaming the "overall political environment". FTU president Ng Chau-pei addressed the results by insisting the election was not a referendum on the government's strategy of "stopping violence".

On 25 November, a day after the election, more than a hundred elected candidates gathered at the Urban Council Centenary Garden near the Hong Kong Polytechnic University (PolyU) campus in solidarity with those who were still besieged by the police inside the campus. In the joint statement, the candidates said the election results had shown that Hong Kong people had not backed down in front of tyranny and police brutality and demanded the police to lift its week-long blockade.

Chinese state media outlets tried to downplay the outcome of district elections in Hong Kong, which saw a landslide victory of the pro-democracy camp. According to BBC, the state media's reaction ranged from making no reference whatsoever to the election results to overt claims that "electoral tampering" had occurred. The daily news program of state broadcaster CCTV, Xinwen Lianbo, remained silent on the results, accusing the US of electoral interference. The English-language version of the China Daily newspaper announced that the elections were over, but did not reference the victory of the pro-democracy camp.

Chief Executive Carrie Lam said that her government would "listen humbly" and "seriously reflect" on views expressed at the election and would set up an independent review committee to look at the cause of social unrest, modelling on Britain's response to the 2011 Tottenham riots. To some, this fell short of the protesters' demand on an independent commission of inquiry. Shortly after the election, U.S. President Donald Trump signed the Hong Kong Human Rights and Democracy Act on 27 November which was previously passed overwhelmingly in the United States Congress into law. In a joint statement by U.S. Senator Marco Rubio, the co-sponsor of the bill, Jim Risch, Ben Cardin and Bob Menendez, it states that "following last weekend's historic elections in Hong Kong that included record turnout, this new law could not be more timely in showing strong US support for Hong Kongers' long-cherished freedoms."

The State Council's removal, on 4 January 2020, of Wang Zhimin from his post as Director of the Liaison Office of the Central People's Government in Hong Kong was widely seen as a response to his failure to advise the central government accurately about the vulnerability of pro-Beijing candidates at the election.

This election is described by some media as potentially the last free and fair election in Hong Kong. Despite the democrats' landslide win, the national security law and election overhaul were imposed by Beijing in the next year, which significantly reduced the chance of democrats being elected as representatives through vetting. More than 70 per cent of elected District Councillors resigned or were disqualified for various reasons.

== See also ==
- 2021 Hong Kong electoral changes
- 2021 Hong Kong legislative election
- Postponement of the 2020 Hong Kong legislative election
- Public Offices (Candidacy and Taking Up Offices) (Miscellaneous Amendments) Ordinance 2021
