= Community Alliance =

Community Alliance 區政聯盟
- Convenor: Vacant
- Founded: 30 May 2019
- Split from: Democratic Party
- Membership (2019): ~80
- Ideology: Liberalism (HK)
- Regional affiliation: Pro-democracy camp
- Colours: Blue
- Legislative Council: 0 / 90
- District Councils: 0 / 470

Website
- Official Facebook page

The Community Alliance (Chinese: 區政聯盟) is a political alliance set up by a group of pro-democratic grassroots activists and community workers, many of whom are the former members of the Democratic Party. Mainly based in New Territories East, the group consists of several local political groups including the Community Sha Tin and Concern Group for Tseung Kwan O People's Livelihood (CGPLTKO). Many of the members contested in the 2019 District Council elections under different banners.

== History ==
The Community Alliance was set up in May 2019 for the 2019 District Council elections. It consists of more than 60 former Democratic Party members and another 20 pro-democracy advocates. Its convenor Ricky Or and two deputies Au Chun-wah and Ting Tsz-yuen, quit the Democratic Party in December 2018 due to the intra-party conflict. Since then, Ricky Or's Tseung Kwan O groups and Ting Tsz-yuen's Sha Tin groups operated under their own local groups of Concern Group for Tseung Kwan O People's Livelihood (CGPLTKO) and Community Sha Tin respectively.

The group planned to field 28 candidates in the elections in November 2019. However, many of its candidates ran under different banners including CGPLTKO, Community Sha Tin, Power for Democracy democrats and independent democrats. All four candidates in Tai Po who associated themselves with the alliance were elected, making it the largest political group in the council with Neo Democrats which also won four seats of which all the elected seats were taken by the pro-democracy camp.

== Performance in elections ==
=== District Council elections ===
Election	Number of popular votes	% of popular votes	Total elected seats	+/−
2019	17,635	0.60	24 / 452	12▲
