= Tai Po District Council =

Hong Kong district council

Coordinates: 22.4461°N 114.1666°E

Tai Po District Council 大埔區議會

Type
- Type: Hong Kong District Council of the Tai Po District

History
- Founded: 1 April 1981 (District Board); 1 July 1997 (Provisional); 1 January 2000 (District Council)

Leadership
- Chair: Eunice Chan Hau-man, Independent
- Vice-Chair: Vacant

Structure
- Seats: 22 councillors consisting of 4 elected members 8 district committee members 8 appointed members 2 ex officio members
- DAB: 6 / 22
- BPA: 3 / 22
- FTU: 1 / 22
- NPP: 1 / 22
- Independent: 11 / 22

Elections
- Voting system: First past the post
- Last election: 10 December 2023

Meeting place
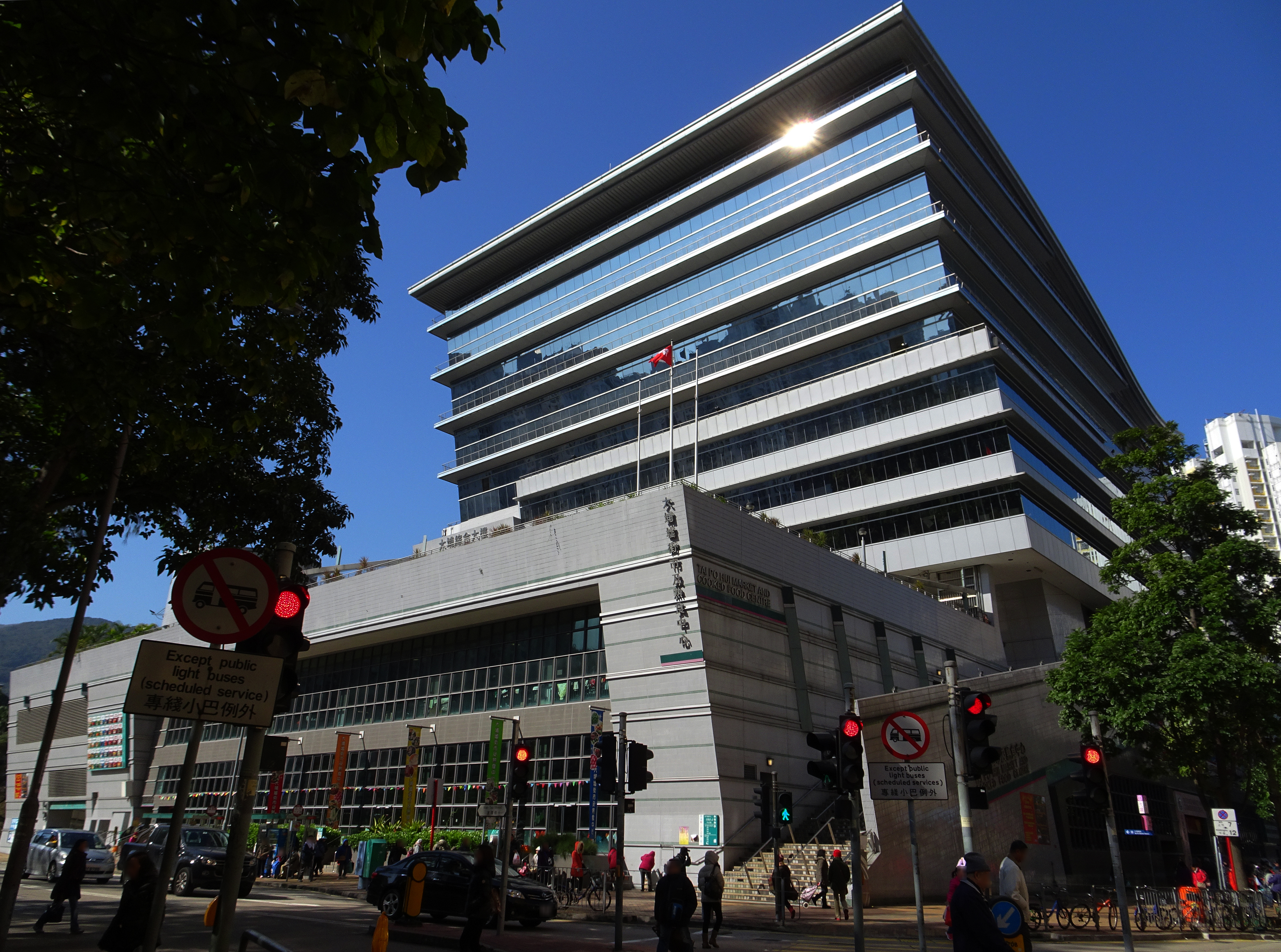
- 4/F, Tai Po Complex, 8 Heung Sze Wui Street, Tai Po, New Territories

Website
- www.districtcouncils.gov.hk/tp/

The Tai Po District Council (Chinese: 大埔區議會; noted as TP) is the district council for the Tai Po District in Hong Kong. It is one of 18 such councils. The Tai Po District Council currently consists of 22 members, of which the district is divided into two constituencies, electing a total of 4 members, 8 district committee members, 8 appointed members, and 2 ex officio members who are the Tai Po and Sai Kung North rural committee chairmen. The latest election was held on 10 December 2023.

== History ==
Emblem of Tai Po District Board (1982–1997)

The Tai Po District Council was established on 1 April 1981 under the name of the Tai Po District Board as the result of the colonial Governor Murray MacLehose's District Administration Scheme reform. The District Board was partly elected with the ex-officio Regional Council members and chairmen of two Rural Committees, Tai Po and Sai Kung North, as well as members appointed by the Governor until 1994 when last Governor Chris Patten refrained from appointing any member.

The Tai Po District Board became Tai Po Provisional District Board after the Hong Kong Special Administrative Region (HKSAR) was established in 1997 with the appointment system being reintroduced by Chief Executive Tung Chee-hwa. The current Tai Po District Council was established on 1 January 2000 after the first District Council election in 1999. The appointed seats were abolished in 2015 after the modified constitutional reform proposal was passed by the Legislative Council in 2010.

The Tai Po District Board was a stronghold of the conservative Liberal Democratic Federation of Hong Kong (LDF) and its successor Hong Kong Progressive Alliance (HKPA) in the 1990s and early 2000s. The pro-business Liberal Party also established its presence in the district in the 1990s surrounding its chairman Allen Lee who was elected through the district in the 1995.

The pro-Beijing Democratic Alliance for the Betterment and Progress of Hong Kong (DAB) and the pro-democracy Democratic Party became the two dominant forces in the district after the handover. For the DAB, its vice-chairman Cheung Hok-ming who is also the chairman of the Tai Po Rural Committee has been the chairman of the council from 1994 to 2003 and again from 2008. For the Democratic Party, it was the base of the reformist "Young Turks" faction in the party represented by Legislative Councillor Andrew Cheng, until they broke away from the Democrats over the disagreement on the constitutional reform proposal in 2010 and formed the Neo Democrats.

In the 2019 election, the pro-democrats formed a coalition called Tai Po Democratic Alliance (TPDA) running in 17 constituencies against the pro-Beijing candidates. The pro-democrats achieved a historic landslide victory by sweeping all the elected seats in the council amid the massive pro-democracy protests. The pro-Beijing camp was completely wiped out except for the two ex-officio members who were also the Rural Committee chairmen.

In the 2023 District Council election, 4 of the 22 seats on the Tai Po District Council are elected by elected members, 8 are elected by district committees, 8 are appointed members, and 2 ex-officio members make up the current Tai Po District Council. In the District Council, 11 of the 22 members are independent members, 6 are from the Democratic Alliance for the Betterment of Hong Kong, 1 from the Federation of Trade Unions, 3 from the BPA, and 1 from the New People Party. 22 of the 22 members are from the pro-establishment camp.

== Political control ==
Since 1982 political control of the council has been held by the following parties:

| Camp in control | Largest party | Years | Composition |
|---|---|---|---|
| No Overall Control | None | 1982 - 1985 | |
| Pro-government | Reform Club | 1985 - 1988 | |
| Pro-government | Meeting Point | 1988 - 1991 | |
| Pro-government | LDF | 1991 - 1994 | |
| Pro-Beijing | Liberal | 1994 - 1997 | |
| Pro-Beijing | Liberal | 1997 - 1999 | |
| Pro-Beijing | Democratic | 2000 - 2003 | |
| Pro-Beijing | Democratic | 2004 - 2007 | |
| Pro-Beijing | DAB | 2008 - 2011 | |
| Pro-Beijing | DAB | 2012 - 2015 | |
| Pro-Beijing | DAB | 2016 - 2019 | |
| Pro-democracy | Neo Democrats | 2020 - 2023 | |
| Pro-Beijing | DAB | 2024 - 2027 | |

== Political makeup ==

Elections are held every four years.

| Political party | Council members | | | | | | | Current members |
| Political party | 1994 | 1999 | 2003 | 2007 | 2011 | 2015 | 2019 | Current members |
|---|---|---|---|---|---|---|---|---|
| Independent | 3 | 8 | 5 | 8 | 8 | 8 | 6 | 11 / 21 |
| CA | - | - | - | - | - | - | 4 | 4 / 21 |
| TPDA | - | - | - | - | - | - | 4 | 1 / 21 |
| Civic Passion | - | - | - | - | - | - | 1 | 1 / 21 |

== District result maps ==
1994

1999

2003

2007

2011

2015

2019

== Members represented ==
| Capacity | Code | Constituency | Name | Political affiliation | Term | | Notes |
|---|---|---|---|---|---|---|---|
| Elected | P01 | Tai Po South | Peggy Wong Pik-kiu | DAB | 1 January 2024 | Incumbent | |
| Elected | P01 | Tai Po South | Lo Hiu-fung | BPA | 1 January 2024 | Incumbent | |
| Elected | P02 | Tai Po North | Wu Cheuk-him | DAB | 1 January 2024 | Incumbent | |
| Elected | P02 | Tai Po North | Lok Siu-luen | Independent | 1 January 2024 | Incumbent | |
| District Committees | | | Lee Man-kit | DAB | 1 January 2024 | Incumbent | |
| District Committees | | | Barry Mui Siu-fung | DAB | 1 January 2024 | Incumbent | |
| District Committees | | | Wong Wai-tung | DAB | 1 January 2024 | Incumbent | |
| District Committees | | | Kitty Chan Kin-kwan | NPP | 1 January 2024 | Incumbent | |
| District Committees | | | Rex Li Wah-kwong | BPA | 1 January 2024 | Incumbent | |
| District Committees | | | Gary Mak Shing-ho | Independent | 1 January 2024 | Incumbent | |
| District Committees | | | Chan Siu-kuen | Independent | 1 January 2024 | Incumbent | |
| District Committees | | | Ken Yu Chi-wing | Independent | 1 January 2024 | Incumbent | |
| Appointed | | | Chan Pok-chi | DAB | 1 January 2024 | Incumbent | |
| Appointed | | | Chan Yung-wa | FTU | 1 January 2024 | Incumbent | |
| Appointed | | | Chan Cho-leung | BPA | 1 January 2024 | Incumbent | |
| Appointed | | | Jeanne Lee Sai-yin | Independent | 1 January 2024 | Incumbent | |
| Appointed | | | Lee Hon-cheung | Independent | 1 January 2024 | Incumbent | |
| Appointed | | | Mui Ching-hung | Independent | 1 January 2024 | Incumbent | |
| Appointed | | | Chan Tsz-kin | Independent | 1 January 2024 | Incumbent | |
| Appointed | | | Johnny Wan Koon-kau | Independent | 1 January 2024 | Incumbent | |
| Ex Officio | | Tai Po Rural Committee Chairman | Lam Yick-kuen | Independent | 1 January 2024 | Incumbent | |
| Ex Officio | | Sai Kung North Rural Committee Chairman | Li Yiu-ban | Independent | 1 January 2024 | Incumbent | |

== Leadership ==
=== Chairs ===
Since 1985, the chairman is elected by all the members of the board:

| Chairman | Years | Political Affiliation |
|---|---|---|
| Nicky Lo Kar-chun | 1981–1983 | District Officer |
| Thomas Chan Chun-yuen | 1983–1985 | District Officer |
| Ho Yung-sang | 1985–1994 | Heung Yee Kuk |
| Cheung Hok-ming | 1994–2003 | DAB/Heung Yee Kuk |
| Cheng Chun-ping | 2004–2007 | DAB |
| Cheung Hok-ming | 2008–2019 | DAB/Heung Yee Kuk |
| Wong Pik-kiu | 2019 | DAB |
| Kwan Wing-yip | 2020–2021 | Neo Democrats→Independent |
| Patrick Mo Ka-chun | 2021–2023 | TPDA |
| Eunice Chan Hau-man | 2024–present | District Officer |

=== Vice Chairs ===
| Vice Chairman | Years | Political Affiliation |
|---|---|---|
| Cheng Chun-ping | 2000–2003 | DAB |
| Wan Kwok-lim | 2004–2007 | Independent |
| Man Chen-fai | 2008–2011 | Heung Yee Kuk |
| Peggy Wong Pik-kiu | 2012–2019 | DAB |
| Cheng Chun-ping | 2019 | DAB |
| Lau Yung-wai | 2020–2023 | Independent |
