= Neo Democrats =

Neo Democrats 新民主同盟
- Convenors: Yam Kai-bong; Chow Yuen-wai; Lui Man-kwong
- Founded: 2 October 2010
- Dissolved: 26 June 2021
- Split from: Democratic Party
- Headquarters: Flat F, 22/F, 6–20; Yin Chong Street, Kowloon
- Ideology: Localism (HK); Liberalism (HK); Populism; Direct Democracy
- Political position: Centre-right to Centre-left
- Regional affiliation: Pro-democracy camp
- Colours: Gold/Orange

Website
- neodemocrats.hk(defunct)

Neo Democrats
- Traditional Chinese: 新民主同盟
Transcriptions
Yue: Cantonese
- Yale Romanization: Sān Màhn jyú Tùhng màhng
- Jyutping: San1 Man4 zyu2 Tung4 mang4

The Neo Democrats was a pro-democracy, localist political group in Hong Kong composed mainly of former and disenchanted members of the Democratic Party New Territories East branch after the 2012 constitutional reform proposals. It had held one seat in the Legislative Council until Gary Fan lost his re-election in the 2016 Legislative Council election. Fan won the seat back in the 2018 by-election, but lost his seat after a court declared that he was not duly elected. It held 8 seats in the District Councils before its dissolution on 26 June 2021.

== Formation ==
The Neo Democrats identified themselves initially as a grouping within the Democratic Party, opposed to its rejection of the Five Constituencies Referendum and concessions towards Beijing that the party was offering in the run-up to the LegCo vote on the Hong Kong government's proposals for democratic reform. It said it aimed to repair the damaged relationship between the Democratic Party and its pan-democratic allies.

As the Neo Democrats styled themselves a continuation of the United Democrats of Hong Kong, they chose to found the group on an anniversary of both the dissolution of UDHK and the foundation of the Democratic Party.

Then on 19 December 2010, thirty members including seven district councillors in the New Territories East resigned from the Democratic Party to formally create the new group. The departees included former party vice-chairman Chan King-ming and at least five other founding members, together representing around ten per cent of the Democratic Party's district councillors and just under five per cent of its membership.

== Ideology ==
The party relied on community outreach and creative funding to compete with better-funded pro-establishment parties in Hong Kong. They were broadly centrist, though they could be argued as leaning both centre-right and centre-left.

== Organisation and membership ==
Members of the group include Gary Fan, Leung Li and Cheung Kwok-keung, and former Democratic Party vice-chairman Chan King-ming.

The Neo Democrats' leadership comprises four convenors who serve six-month terms. Convenors currently include Gary Fan.

== Immigration and localism ==
The Neo Democrats represented by Gary Fan have called for the government to take back the approval rights on one-way permits from Chinese authorities and to reduce the quota of such permits for applicants not under the family reunion category. Fan also refers to immigrants from mainland China and the quota of 150 daily permits as "the root of the housing problem".

In September 2013, Gary Fan co-sponsored a controversial ad which claimed that cutting people from the source of immigration would help the people of Hong Kong to get to the bottom of the housing problem, while rejecting claims of bias or discrimination against mainlanders, despite condemnation from the Equal Opportunities Commission. Fan later introduced a motion on adhering to the need to "put Hong Kong people first" in formulating policies, but the motion was ultimately defeated. Fan's motion was rejected by both camps of pro-Beijing and pan-democrats.

== Electoral politics ==
In the 2015 District Council election, Neo Democrats became the best performers when 15 out of their 16 candidates fielded won, the total number of seats having increased from 7 to 15 since the previous election. They became one of the most successful groups within the pan-democrats camp.

Frankie Lam returned to Neo Democrat in April 2016. He is a Sai Kung District Council member and was a Neo Democrat member in 2010, before the group formally split from the Democratic Party. Lam decided to remain in the Democratic Party until 2016, due to Neo Democrat is the largest pan-democrat party in Sai Kung District Council.

In the 2016 Legislative Council election, the Neo Democrats initially planned to field candidates in Kowloon East, New Territories West, District Council (Second), as well as seek for re-election in its incumbent New Territories East seat. It later decided to field two lists in New Territories East and District Council (Second) "super seat" despite the group's breakaway from the Democratic Party due to its opposition to the creation of the five "super seats" in 2010. Kwan Wing-yip, Neo Democrats' District Council (Second) candidate, refused to join the pan-democracy camp's coordination plan initiated by Benny Tai to avoid splitting the pro-democracy votes, abandoned his campaign one day before the election due to the pressure to help the pan-democracy camp to win three seats. As a result, Kwan's ticket won only 1.24 per cent of the vote share and its sole legislator Gary Fan lost his re-election in New Territories East by winning 5.44 per cent of the vote share. Three Sha Tin District Councillors, Billy Chan Shiu-yeung, Chiu Chu-pong and Yau Man-chun, defected to former legislator Andrew Cheng during the election were expelled from the party on 6 September.

Fan returned to the Legislative Council in the 2018 New Territories by-election following the disqualification of localist Baggio Leung of Youngspiration over the Legislative Council oath-taking controversy in March. He was elected with more than 180,000 votes, defeating the pro-China common candidate Tang Ka-piu of the Hong Kong Federation of Trade Unions (FTU) and the Democratic Alliance for the Betterment and Progress of Hong Kong (DAB). He was then removed from the Legislative Council after the Court of Final Appeal declined to hear an appeal from a lower court which held that he was not duly elected as the Returning Officer for the election disqualified another candidate who was not given an opportunity to respond.

== Disbandment ==
The Neo Democrats announced the disbandment on 26 June 2021. The group said Hong Kong had undergone drastic changes over the past two years and the political environment now was much worse than before, and most of its district councillors agreed to dissolve the party.

Former Neo Democrat members Gary Fan, Roy Tam and Ben Chung are among 47 pro-democracy figures charged with subversion for taking part in the camp's primaries for Legco elections last year. The three have been remanded in custody since late February.

== Electoral performance ==
=== Legislative council elections ===
Election	Number of popular votes	% of popular votes	GC seats	FC seats	Total seats	+/−	Position
2012	28,621	1.58	1	0	1 / 70	1▲	10th▲
2016	31,595▲	1.46▼	0	0	0 / 70	–	–

=== District council elections ===
Election	Number of popular votes	% of popular votes	Total elected seats	+/−
2011	25,437	2.15	8 / 412	8▲
2015	42,148▲	2.92▲	15 / 431	7▲
2019	87,923▲	3.00▲	19 / 452	4▲

== See also ==
- Democratic Party (Hong Kong)
- Pan-democracy camp
- Claudia Mo
- HK First
