= 2025 Hong Kong legislative election =

8th legislative election in Hong Kong

- 7 December 2025

All 90 seats to the Legislative Council 46 seats needed for a majority
- Registered: 4,131,298 (GC) ▼7.64%
- Turnout: 1,317,682 (31.90%) ▲1.70pp
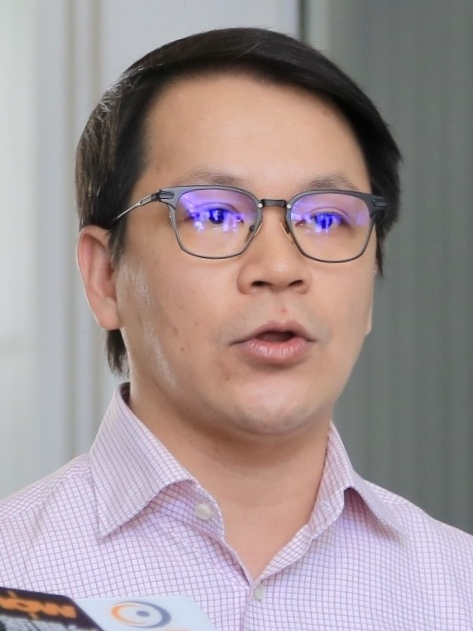

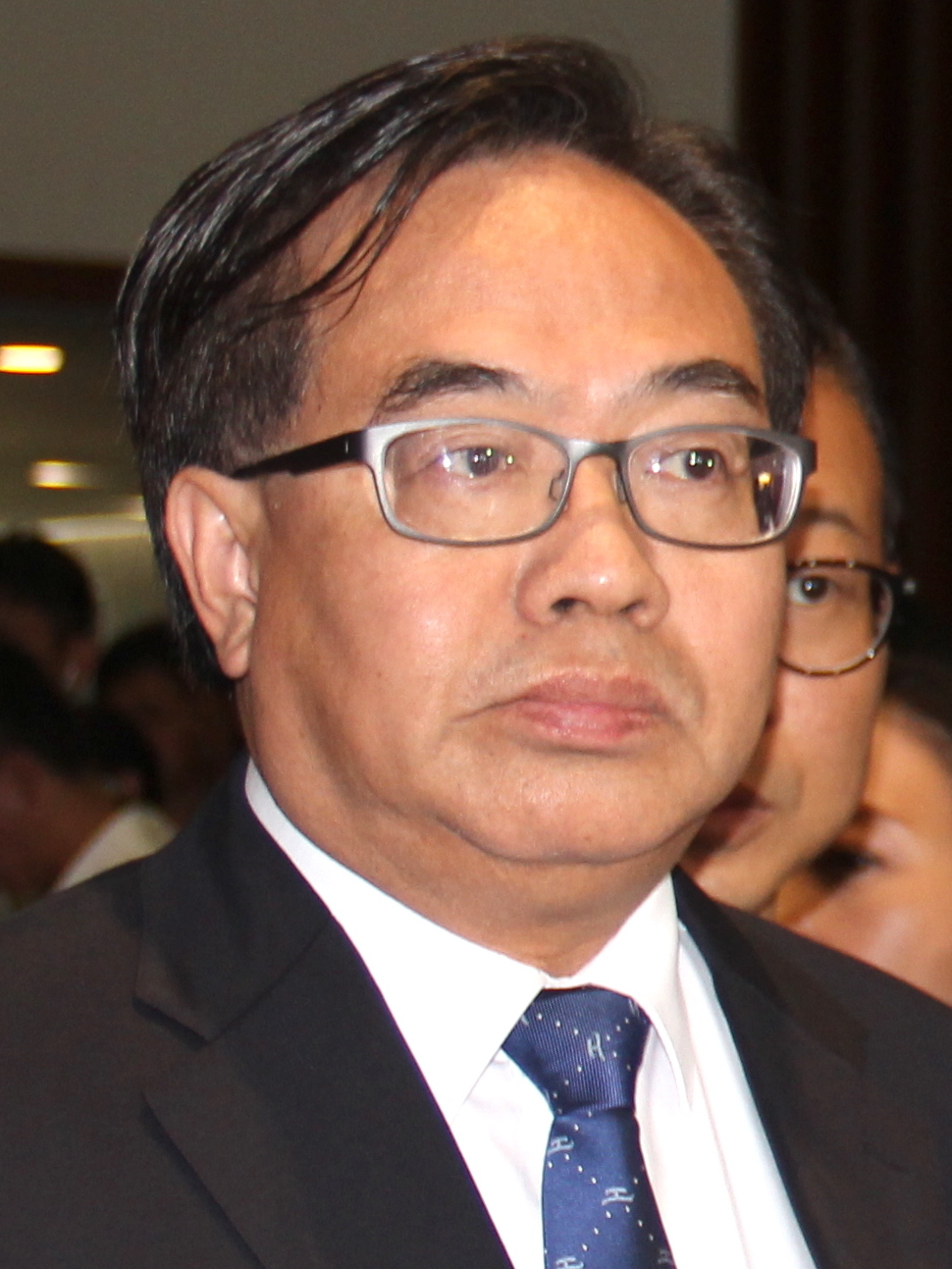

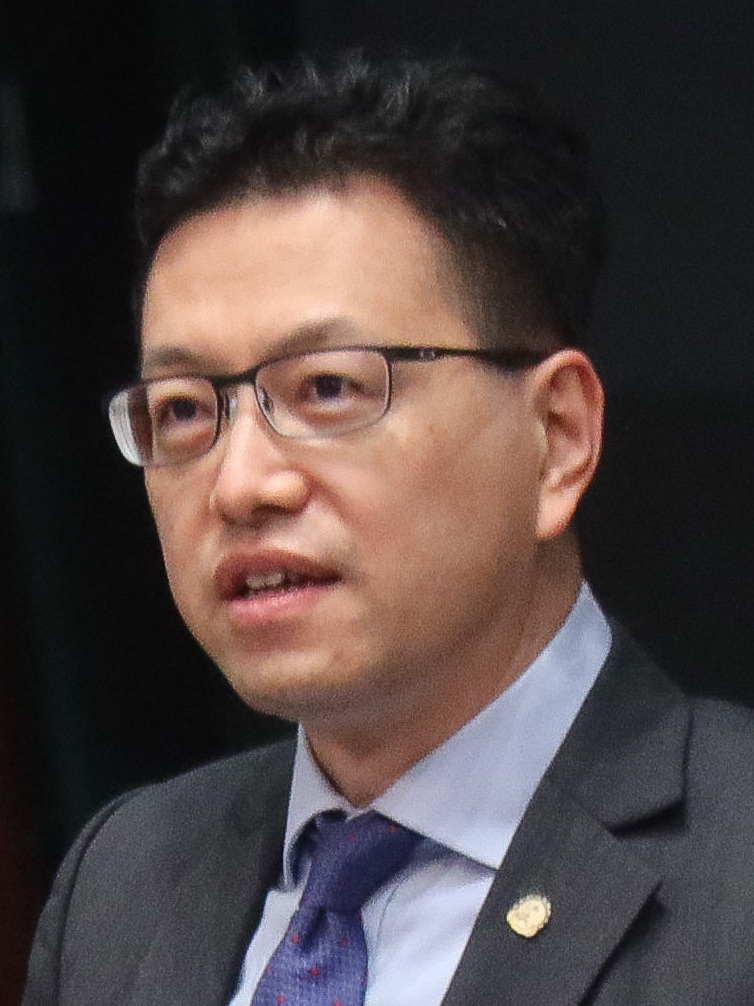

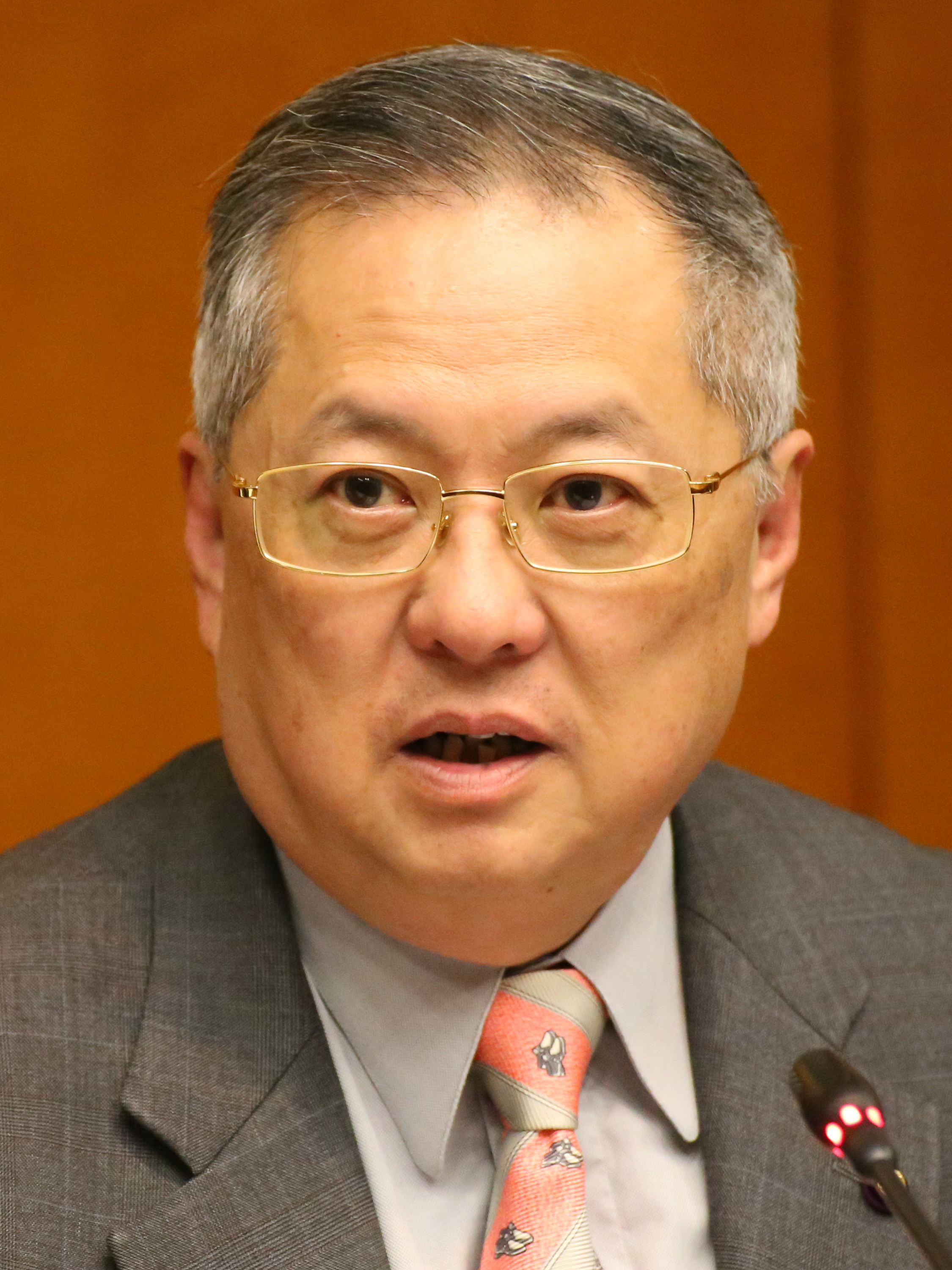

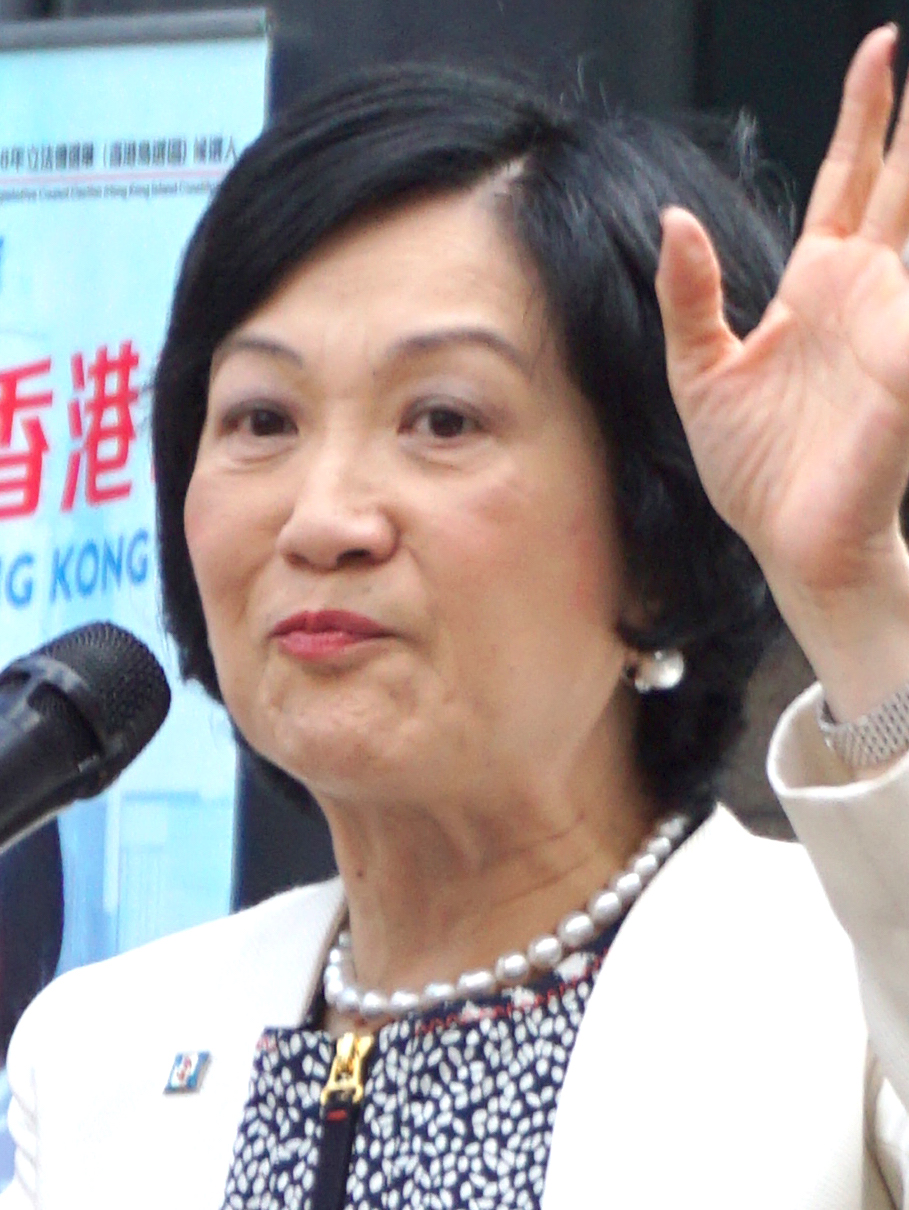

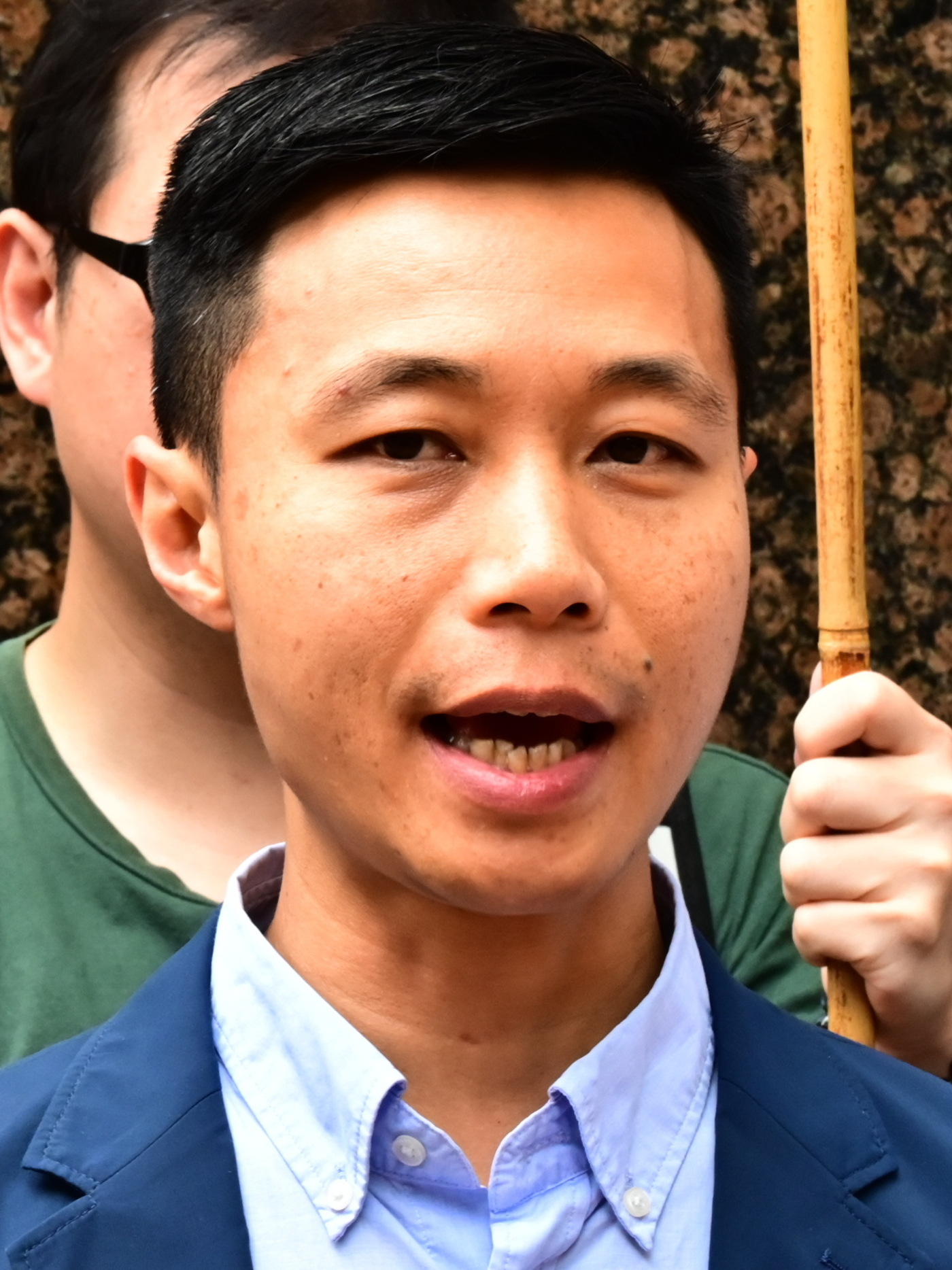

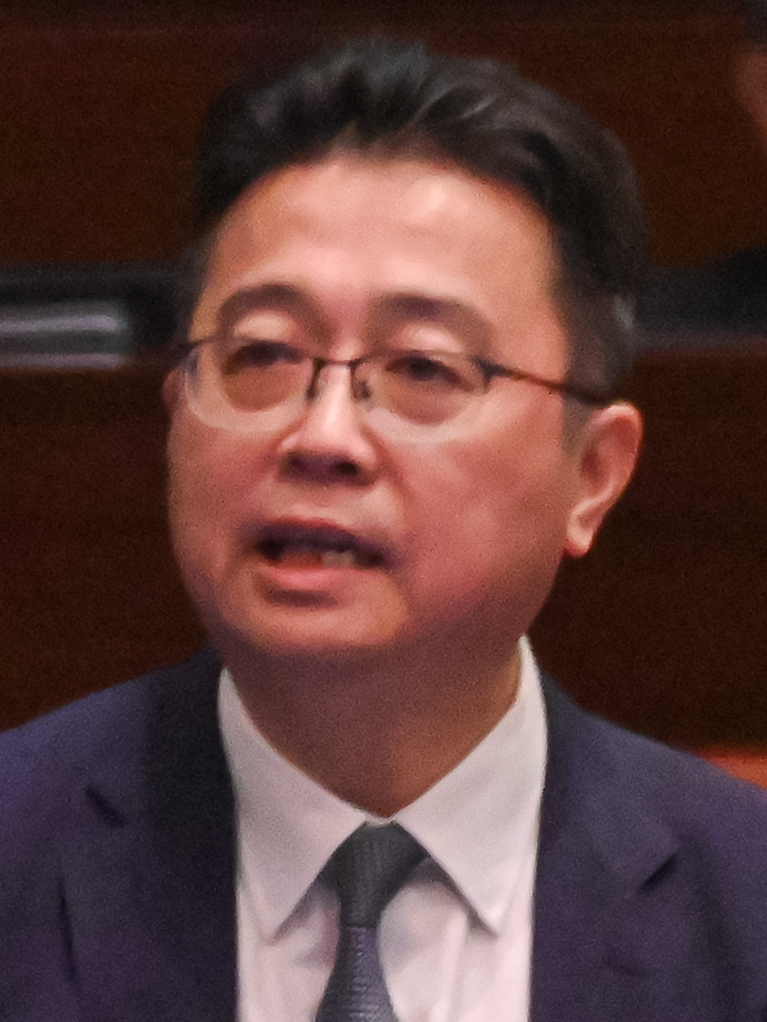

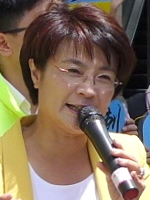

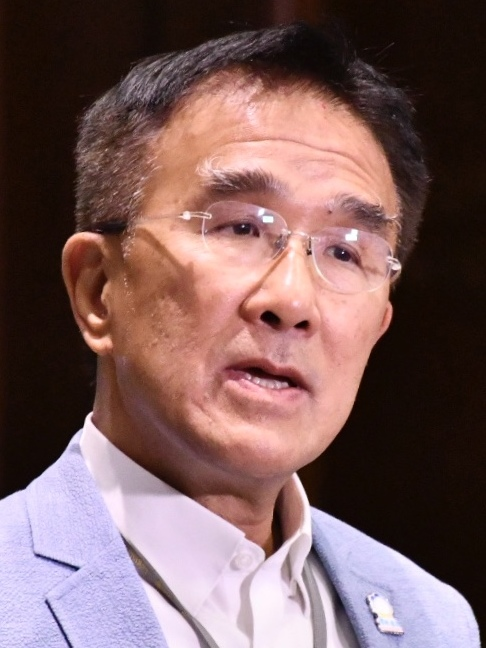
	First party	Second party	Third party
Leader	Gary Chan	Lo Wai-kwok	Ng Chau-pei
Party	DAB	BPA	FTU
Alliance	Pro-Beijing	Pro-Beijing	Pro-Beijing
Leader's seat	NT North East	Retired from Engineering	HK Island East
Last election	19 seats, 51.43%	7 seats, N/A (Note: Did not run in Geographical Constituencies)	8 seats, 14.53%
Seats won	20	8	7
Seat change	▲1	▼1	Steady
Popular vote	432,473	38,602	260,303
Percentage	33.88%	3.02%	20.39%
Swing	▼17.55pp	N/A	▲5.86pp
	Fourth party	Fifth party	Sixth party
Leader	Tommy Cheung	Regina Ip	Lam Chun-sing
Party	Liberal	NPP	FLU
Alliance	Pro-Beijing	Pro-Beijing	Pro-Beijing
Leader's seat	Retired from Catering	Retired from HK Island West	Election Committee
Last election	4 seats, N/A	5 seats, 11.35%	2 seat, N/A
Seats won	4	3	2
Seat change	Steady	▼3	Steady
Popular vote	32,371	147,113	N/A
Percentage	2.54%	11.52%	N/A
Swing	N/A	▲0.17pp	N/A
	Seventh party	Eighth party	Ninth party
Leader	Lau Chi-pang	Christine Fong	Michael Tien
Party	FEW	PP	Roundtable
Alliance	Pro-Beijing	Pro-Beijing	Pro-Beijing
Leader's seat	Election Committee	NT South East	Retired from NT North West
Last election	2 seats, N/A	1 seat, 2.89%	1 seat, 3.02%
Seats won	2	1	1
Seat change	▼1	Steady	Steady
Popular vote	N/A	58,828	34,756
Percentage	N/A	4.61%	2.72%
Swing	N/A	▲1.72pp	▼0.30pp
Party control before election
Pro-Beijing camp
Party control after election
Pro-Beijing camp

The 2025 Hong Kong Legislative Council election was a general election held on 7 December 2025 to elect all 90 members of the 8th Legislative Council of Hong Kong. Following the 2021 Hong Kong electoral changes, 90 seats were up for election, including 40 seats elected by the 1,500-member Election Committee, 30 trade-based indirectly elected functional constituency seats, and 20 seats directly elected through geographical constituencies. The election, in which only pro-government "patriots" were allowed to run and only 20 seats were popularly elected, was internationally considered to be neither free nor fair.

The past legislative session, the 7th Legislative Council, was criticised for its lack of meaningful discourse, with many bills being approved without a quorum. The introduction of smart ballot boxes also prompted controversy, while the future of democrats and moderates was called into question due to the effective dissolution of the pro-democracy camp. Ultimately, there were only two "non-core pro-establishment candidates" from the PoD Research Institute, both of whom did not declare their affiliation and came last.

Following multiple reports that indicated the central Chinese government established an age limit on lawmakers, all 12 of them aged over 70, including council president Andrew Leung and the leaders of five parties – Lo Wai-kwok of the Business and Professionals Alliance for Hong Kong (BPA), Regina Ip of the New People's Party (NPP), Tommy Cheung of the Liberal Party, Michael Tien of Roundtable, and Tik Chi-yuen of Third Side – chose not to seek another term for various reasons, contributing to a retirement wave and an abundance of newcomer candidates. Third Side and New Prospect for Hong Kong did not field any candidates after their incumbents retired.

Election-related activities were suspended due to the Wang Fuk Court fire, but the election went ahead as scheduled despite calls for postponement. Only government-organised election forums were held, which were criticised for lacking debate. The government ran a massive turnout campaign, set up dedicated polling stations, and extended voting hours to raise the historically low turnout from the last election. Many people were arrested for damaging election posters and inciting others not to vote or cast invalid votes. The election resulted in a 31.9% voter turnout—a slight increase from the 2021 election but still lower than the 52.3% turnout in 2016. The total votes cast in the geographical constituencies also decreased from 2021 by 33,000, and registration decreased by 7.64%.

== Background ==
This is the second "patriots governing Hong Kong" election under the new electoral system introduced in 2021, after which the Legislative Council was expanded from 70 to 90 seats, but with only 20 seats allocated for geographical constituencies (GCs) which are directly elected by constituents. The remaining seventy seats include 40 Election Committee Constituency (ECC) seats selected by the 1,500-member body, and 30 seats of trade-based indirectly elected functional constituencies (FCs) voted by selected groups of professionals and corporate representatives.

Only pro-Beijing "patriots" are allowed to run; the majority of opposition pro-democracy members were banned, jailed, or forced into exile. In addition, the election is considered a disproportionate two-tier democracy and very limited popular representation, as only 20 of the Council's 90 seats are directly elected. The current election laws are considered by the foreign ministries of various countries, (Note: Australia, Canada, New Zealand, the United Kingdom, and the United States condemned the election law changes in a joint statement by then-U.S. Secretary of State Antony Blinken) Inter-Parliamentary Alliance on China, an inter-parliamentary group of lawmakers in several countries, and some NGOs to be neither free nor fair.

=== Past legislative session ===
The 7th Legislative Council elected in 2021 was the first after the national security law and electoral changes were imposed by the government of China. Without any legislator explicitly from the pro-democracy camp, the legislature packed with pro-Beijing members was criticised to lack meaningful discussions and debates, while newcomers of the Legislative Council resorted to politically correct measures only, such as repeating speeches by Chinese officials. Ming Pao reported in August 2023 that amongst the 24 government bills passed since the beginning of the legislative term, including the domestic security law which was fast-tracked, 16 of those were approved without a quorum, prompting concerns of LegCo members' performance. Andrew Leung, President of the Legislative Council, denied claims that the chamber rubber-stamped bills and defended it as highly efficient. However, an opinion poll by pro-government party and think tank Path of Democracy said 48.1% of the interviewed expressed dissatisfaction with legislators' performance and only 29.4% were content.

Apart from evaluation from the own party, it was also reported that government officials were involved in assessing the performance of the legislators in the run-up to the election, an act seen as unprecedented before the "patriot-only" principle was implemented.

=== Smart ballot box ===
In December 2024, the government of Hong Kong announced a series of new measures to be implemented in this election. The Improving Electoral Arrangements (Consolidated Amendments) Bill contained a plan to introduce "smart ballot boxes" to ensure ballots were validly marked. While the Constitutional and Mainland Affairs Bureau said the scanners would "streamline and enhance" procedures while ensuring that "cardinal election principles" such as voting confidentiality would be upheld, some lawmakers expressed concerns over the implications of compromising vote secrecy. Although insisting the voter rights would be protected as voters would not be identified, the government withdrew the proposal less than a week later after "considering the views of legislators". The bureau said it attaches great importance to the views and is willing to "accept well-intentioned advice", while the smart ballot boxes will still be made available for voters who choose to use them.

=== Future of democrats and moderates ===
The implementation of the "Patriots administering Hong Kong" principle barred "unpatriotic" opposition from being elected to public offices. The flagship pro-democracy group, the Democratic Party, once the largest party in the Legislative Council, is planning to dissolve in 2025. Media sources indicated Chinese government has pressed for the closure of the "worthless" party, which was unable to run in the 2021 and 2023 "patriot-only" elections. Reportedly also under pressure, the League of Social Democrats disbanded in late June. The pro-democracy camp is considered to have come to an end without any active political groups.

The new rules also reduced the portion of directly elected seats to around 22%, which was considered by democratic watchdogs as a decrease in democratic values. Hong Kong Economic Journal said some members from the business sector recommended Beijing authorities to draw up a timeline to gradually reintroduce more elected seats in order to improve Hong Kong's international image and align with the Basic Law article. Third Side, the only self-claimed moderate group in the Legislative Council, and Path of Democracy, an extra-parliamentary moderate group, expressed the hope that an electoral reform would be initiated by the government in due course. However, it was speculated by media that the moderates would also be barred from legislative races as they are "no longer needed in a patriotic administration".

== Retirement wave ==
=== Announcements ===
On 29 September, Andrew Leung, who served as president of the legislature for nine years, made a surprise announcement that he would stand down from the legislature, citing his age and his family. He said he hoped this would give capable candidates time to prepare sufficiently for the election. His decision further raised speculation about an age limit of 70 for lawmakers, although Leung said it was solely his personal decision. While recalling his nine-year leadership, Leung said the Legislative Council successfully ended the opposition's disruption. Possible successors for the presidency include Starry Lee and Chan Chun-ying. Ma Fung-kwok, 70, announced his retirement on the same day as Leung, also citing his age.

Two veteran legislators, 76-year-old Liberal Party leader Tommy Cheung and Chan Kin-por, 71, confirmed their intention not to seek another term on 11 October. Cheung said he had carefully considered his decision with the development of the One Country, Two Systems, while Chan said he would be passing the baton to younger rank to run for the election. The sole self-branded "non-establishment" moderate member Tik Chi-yuen was also stepping down, saying a younger colleague from his party Third Side will run only as the party did not gather enough funding to support his re-election. More lawmakers dropped out in the next few days, including 72-year-old Business and Professionals Alliance for Hong Kong chairman Lo Wai-kwok, pro-Beijing camp's unofficial convenor Martin Liao, aged 68, and Roundtable convener Michael Tien. Outspoken lawmakers such as Doreen Kong opted to stand down as well, and dismissed claims that she was forced to do so. The two remaining legislators over 70, Regina Ip and Lai Tung-kwok of the New People's Party (NPP), confirmed their retirement on 25 October. Another outspoken member Paul Tse did not submit nomination for the election, saying that "silence speaks louder than words", and thereby ending his 17-year career in the assembly.

As a result, 35 incumbent legislators did not seek re-election, more than half having served only one term. All 12 incumbents who were over 70 chose not to seek re-election, while the other 23 decided against staying in the legislature likely because of their unsatisfactory performance, or vocal criticisms on some government policies, or to pave way for succession within the party.

=== Reactions ===
The unprecedentedly large wave of retirements sparked claims that Beijing imposed an age limit for lawmakers and demanded a major upheaval of the composition, although the officials denied "blessing" or giving "special treatment" for candidates. John Lee, the Chief Executive, said the departures are normal and personal decisions by the lawmakers and the Executive Council will not be reshuffled after ExCo members left the LegCo. Lee added the generational succession is a positive sign for the Legislative Council. However, the farewell motion, which is tabled by convention at the last meeting to mark the end of the term, was withdrawn in light of possible "sensitive remarks" and giving undue advantages to legislators before the election. A farewell banquet for LegCo members and John Lee was also cancelled.

Both Chinese government and John Lee strongly rebutted claims that Beijing has "blessed" any hopefuls in the election and condemned "anti-China" forces for ongoing attempts to sabotage, disrupt, and discredit the patriots-only election through spreading rumours of Chinese interference. They also praised the retiring incumbents for their nobility and upright characters.

According to John Burns, emeritus professor of politics at the University of Hong Kong, China has sought to strengthen its influence in the legislature after this retirement wave, with younger candidates linked to the mainland emerging in their place. He claimed that China’s representative office "carefully curates" electoral contests to ensure preferred candidates win.

=== List of departing incumbents ===
Departing incumbents	Constituency	*	Entered LegCo in	Party	Age	Notes
Andrew Leung	Industrial (First)	FC	2004	BPA	74	Announced on 29 September 2025, citing age
Ma Fung-kwok	Election Committee		1996 (PLC); Continuously since 2012	New Forum	70	Announced on 29 September 2025, citing age
Tik Chi-yuen	Social Welfare	FC	1991; Continuously since 2021	Third Side	68	Announced on 10 October 2025
Chan Kin-por	Insurance	FC	2008	Independent	71	Announced on 11 October 2025
Tommy Cheung	Catering	FC	2000	Liberal	76	Announced on 11 October 2025
Kennedy Wong	Import and Export	FC	1996 (PLC); Continuously since 2021	DAB	62	Announced on 11 October 2025, to devote more time to NPC
Gary Zhang	New Territories North	GC	2021	New Prospect	36	Announced on 12 October 2025, due to family reasons
Jeffrey Lam	Commercial (First)	FC	2004	BPA	74	Announced on 12 October 2025, to focus on businesses
Connie Lam	New Territories South East	GC	2021	PP	38	Announced on 12 October 2025, to pursue doctoral studies and career
Frankie Yick	Transport	FC	2012	Liberal	72	Announced on 13 October 2025
Lo Wai-kwok	Engineering	FC	2012	BPA	72	Announced on 13 October 2025
Chow Man-kong	Election Committee		2021	Independent	44	Announced on 13 October 2025
Martin Liao	Commercial (Second)	FC	2012	Independent	68	Announced on 14 October 2025
Dennis Lam	Election Committee		2021	Independent	66	Announced on 15 October 2025, to focus on own career
Louis Loong	Real Estate and Construction	FC	2021	BPA	74	Announced on 15 October 2025, to focus on business association's affairs
Michael Tien	New Territories North West	GC	2012	Roundtable	75	Announced on 20 October 2025
Tony Tse	Architectural, Surveying, Planning and Landscape	FC	2012; Continuously since 2018	Independent	71	Announced on 20 October 2025
Lau Kwok-fan	New Territories North	GC	2016	DAB	44	Not included in DAB's line-up announced on 21 October 2025
Leung Hei	Hong Kong Island East	GC	2021	DAB	40	Not included in DAB's line-up announced on 21 October 2025
Stanley Li	New Territories South East	GC	2021	DAB	42	Not included in DAB's line-up announced on 21 October 2025
Lillian Kwok	Election Committee		2021	DAB	46	Not included in DAB's line-up announced on 21 October 2025
Doreen Kong	Election Committee		2021	Independent	55	Announced on 22 October 2025
So Cheung-wing	Election Committee		2021	Independent	65	Announced on 23 October 2025
Regina Ip	Hong Kong Island West	GC	2008	NPP	75	Not included in NPP's line-up announced on 25 October 2025
Lai Tung-kwok	Election Committee		2021	NPP	74	Not included in NPP's line-up announced on 25 October 2025
Eunice Yung	Election Committee		2016	NPP	48	Not included in NPP's line-up announced on 25 October 2025
Chu Kwok-keung	Education	FC	2021	FEW	51	Announced on 25 October 2025, to focus on education affairs
Benson Luk	Election Committee		2021	BPA	42	Announced on 27 October 2025
Ambrose Lam	Legal	FC	2021	Independent	64	Announced on 5 November 2025, to devote more time to law firm
Shang Hailong	Election Committee		2022	Independent	43	Announced on 6 November 2025
Chan Yuet-ming	Election Committee		2021	Independent	53	Announced on 6 November 2025
Tan Yueheng	Election Committee		2021	Independent	63	Announced on 6 November 2025
Kenneth Leung	Election Committee		2021	Independent	41	Announced on 6 November 2025
Wendy Hong	Election Committee		2021	Independent	50	Announced on 6 November 2025
Paul Tse	Election Committee		2008	Independent	66	Did not submit nomination

== Contesting parties and candidates ==
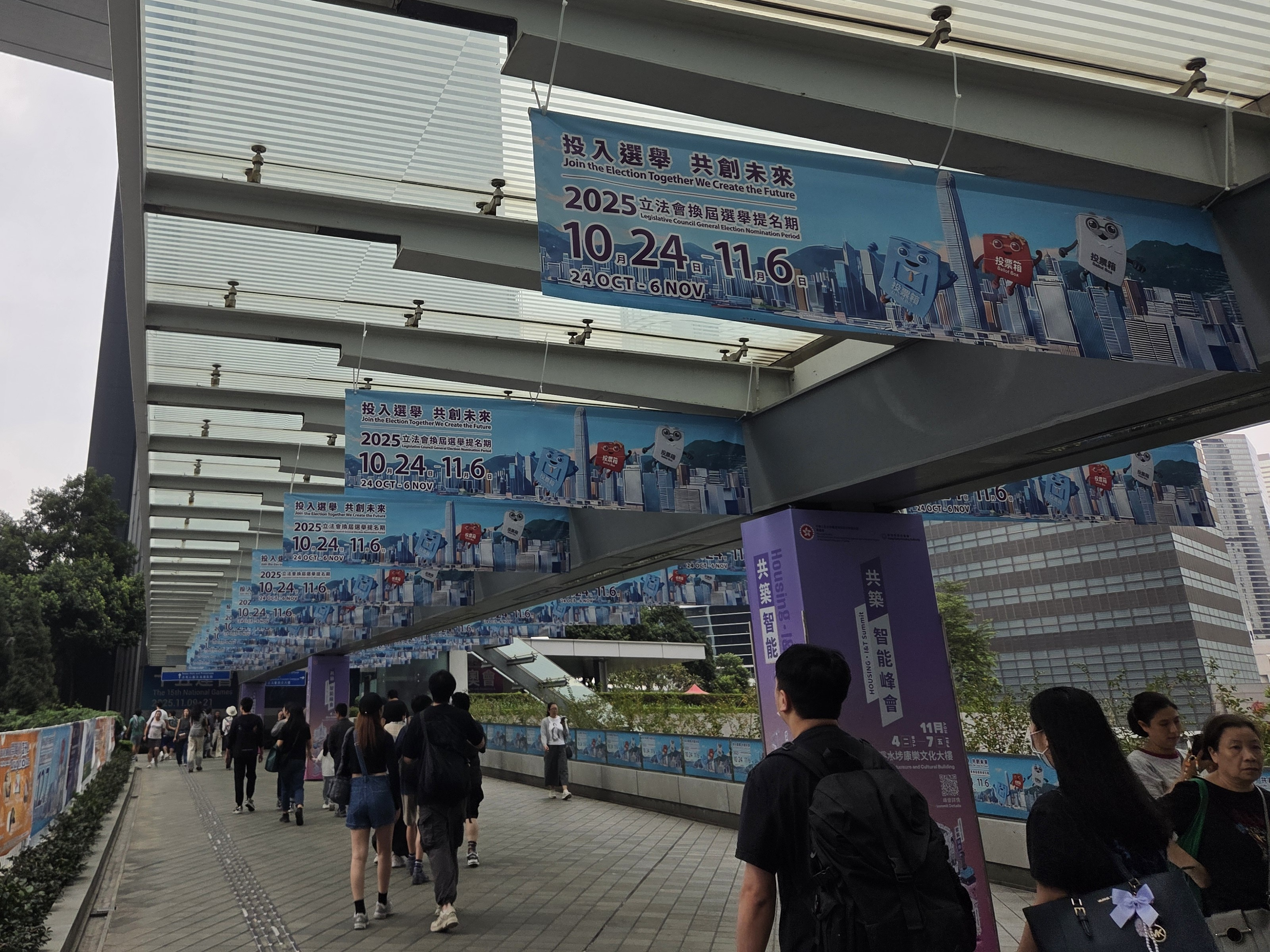
161 nominations were received after the massive wave of retirement

A total of 161 nominations were received to run, seven more than the previous election, with 107 of them being newcomers. Nearly half, 13 of the 28 functional constituencies, were contested by new faces. South China Morning Post noted that 30% of the 161 candidates had links to mainland Chinese firms, a 50% increase from 2021, which indicated the prominence of mainland capital in Hong Kong's economy. Up to 16 of the Hong Kong's 36 National People's Congress (NPC) deputies also registered to run in the election, more than double the seven in the 2021 election, alongside at least 12 members of the Chinese People’s Political Consultative Conference (CPPCC). All 161 competitors were cleared to contest by the vetting panel Candidate Eligibility Review Committee, as announced on 10 November.

- Democratic Alliance for the Betterment and Progress of Hong Kong (DAB): DAB endorsed 26 candidates including 13 for the ten directly elected constituencies, hoping to win all two seats in each of the three constituencies. Five DAB members will run in functional constituencies, and the remaining eight will fight for seats selected by the Election Committee. 14 out of the 26 are incumbent legislators.
  - New Territories Association of Societies (NTAS): Tam Chun-kwok, chairman of the NTAS, an umbrella group of the local societies in the New Territories, which usually ran under the DAB ticket, made a solo bid for the New Territories North constituency, hoping to win two seats together with DAB.
- Business and Professionals Alliance for Hong Kong (BPA): Five of the current BPA legislators decided not to run, including incumbents Andrew Leung, also the LegCo President, Jeffrey Lam and party chairman Lo Wai-kwok. The party ran 14 candidates in the election, including four seeking re-election. The party endorse four candidates to run in direct elections, and five new candidates to run in the four functional constituencies held by the retiring incumbents, including the Commercial (First) constituency where two candidates from BPA would compete to succeed Andrew Leung.
- Hong Kong Federation of Trade Unions (FTU): All seven current legislators are seeking another term, making the FTU the only major party with no serving members quitting the legislature. Along with the nine new faces, the FTU is putting forward 16 candidates in total, with nine in direct elections, three in functional constituencies, and four in the Election Committee constituency.
- New People's Party (NPP) and Civil Force (CF): The NPP saw half of its incumbents not seeking for re-election, including founding chairwoman Regina Ip, also an Executive Councillor and two vice-chairs Lai Tung-kwok and Eunice Yung. It planned to field eight candidates, including five newcomers vying for seats in direct elections. Incumbent Judy Chan is switching to Hong Kong Island West from the Election Committee constituency in order to hold Ip's seat.
- Liberal Party: The Liberals also saw half of its four incumbents stepping down, including the longest-serving member in the LegCo, Tommy Cheung. The party slated to send five candidates for the election. Apart from the two legislators running for re-election, two hopefuls backed by the party will run in direct elections, while a third would seek to hold Tommy Cheung's seat after his retirement. It also marked the first time that Liberals would be absent from the race for the Transport constituency since its creation in 1998, after not endorsing any candidate to succeed Frankie Yick.
- Hong Kong Federation of Education Workers (FEW): Chairman Lau Chi-pang and President Wong Kam-leung ran for the Election Committee constituency, while incumbent Tang Fei switched to the Education constituency, replacing retiring Chu Kwok-keung. Ray Cheung Chak-chung, Associate vice-president of the City University of Hong Kong and FEW vice-chairman, also ran in the Education constituency against Tang, but did not register with his FEW affiliation, same as Wong and Tang.
- Federation of Hong Kong and Kowloon Labour Unions (FLU): Chairman Lam Chun-sing and Secretary-General Chau Siu-chung ran for re-election. Tam Kam-lin, director-general of the Hong Kong Safety Supervisors Association (HKSSA), is also a member of the FLU.

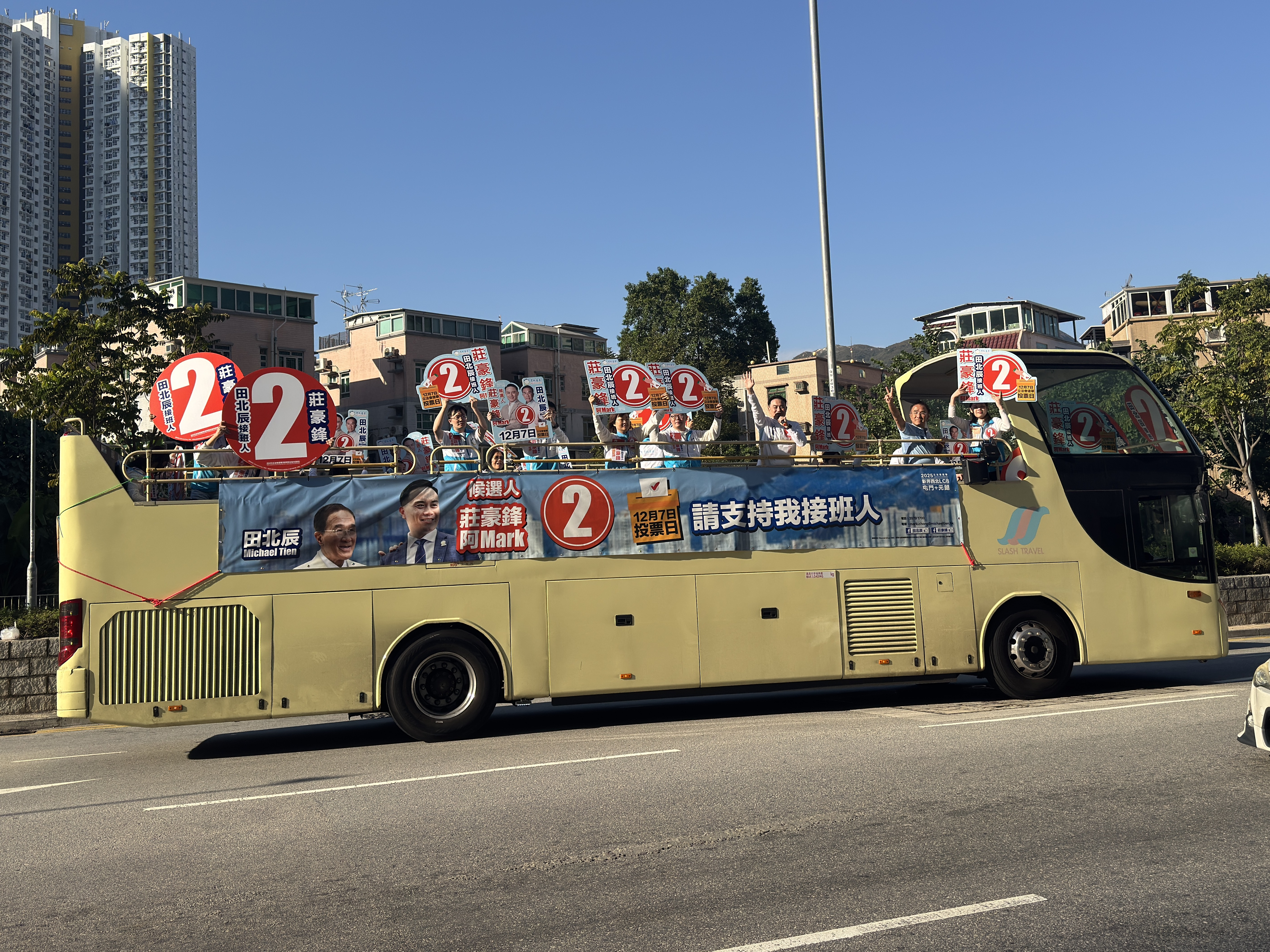
Mark Chong canvassing with Michael Tien

- Roundtable: Following convener Michael Tien's retirement, Mark Chong Ho-fung, director-general of the party, would stand as a candidate in Tien's New Territories North West constituency.
- Kowloon West New Dynamic (KWND): Scott Leung from the local district-based party ran in Kowloon West for a second term.
- Professional Power (PP): Christine Fong, leader of the Tseung Kwan O local group, made her sixth election bid after Connie Lam, whom she mentored, stood down from the Legislative Council and subsequently joined the NPP.
- PoD Research Institute (PoD): Allan Wong, an appointed member of the Yuen Long District Council, and Jeffrey Chan are nominated to run for a seat in New Territories North East and Kowloon East. Wong and Chan are the only two candidates considered to be "non-core establishment members"; both did not declare their affiliation with PoD.

Several district councillors joined the direct election as independents, including Kowloon City's Kitson Yang, who is seeking re-election as representative of Kowloon Central. Vivian Kong, Olympic gold medalist in fencing, stood in the Tourism constituency after her foreign residency barred her to run in direct elections. Kong denied reports that she had considered making a bid in direct elections, and confirmed that she had applied to give up her Canadian passport.

The only moderate political party with a pro-democracy background, Third Side, which held one seat in the legislature, originally aimed at winning two geographical constituencies as a breakthrough and keeping one functional constituency. Its single candidate failed to get enough nominations from each sector of the Election Committee, meaning that the party would lose all its representation in the upcoming LegCo. The New Prospect for Hong Kong, a political party catering to mainland drifters in Hong Kong, did not put forward any candidate, after its sole incumbent Gary Zhang did not seek for re-election.

=== List of incumbents switching constituencies ===
Party	Incumbent	Elected constituency	Standing constituency
DAB (2)	Chan Han-pan	New Territories South West	Election Committee
DAB (2)	Steven Ho	Agriculture and Fisheries	Election Committee
FTU (3)	Dennis Leung	Labour	Election Committee
FTU (3)	Kwok Wai-keung	Labour	Hong Kong Island West
FTU (3)	Luk Chung-hung	Election Committee	New Territories North West
NPP (1)	Judy Chan	Election Committee	Hong Kong Island West
FEW (1)	Tang Fei	Election Committee	Education
Independent (2)	Yiu Pak-leung	Tourism	Election Committee
Independent (2)	Chan Pui-leung	Election Committee	Insurance

== Campaign ==
All election-related activities were suspended following the Wang Fuk Court fire on 26 November for the government to be fully engaged in handling the disaster. Election forums and electioneering by all major parties were cancelled. Despite calls to postpone the election, John Lee confirmed on 2 December, after the end of the three-day mourning period, that the election would go ahead as planned.

=== Election forums ===
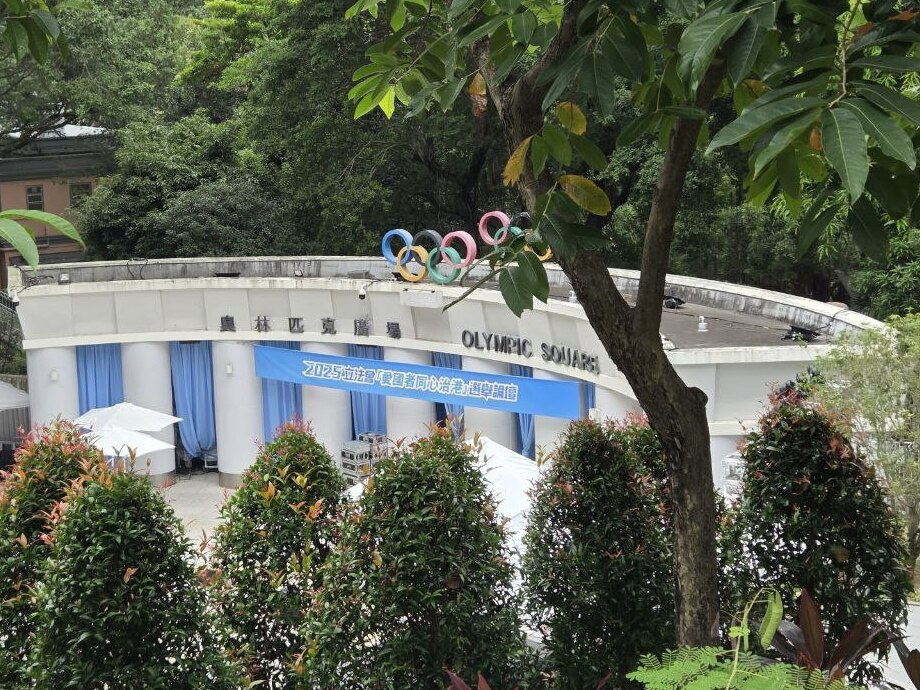
Election forum at Hong Kong Park under preparation

The Hong Kong government announced that it would hold 39 election forums starting from 11 November. Local media reported that several media organisations, including three television stations, had planned to hold "around eight to nine" election forums, but were called off suddenly, as candidates decided to only attend government forums due to time and stress. Government officials declined to comment whether the candidates were required to attend only government-organised forums. However, the forums were criticised for lacking debate between the candidates, and the authorities reportedly encouraged more interaction in the following forums. Chief Secretary for Administration Eric Chan said the government is hoping for a "higher-level" debate without insults, foul language, or other tactics seen in past debates.

The content of an i-CABLE News interview which showed campaign workers who attended the forum unable to recall the candidates' names and admitting that they were arranged to participate without knowing its details was taken down a few hours after airing, but was not reported by mainstream Hong Kong media.

=== Turnout campaign ===
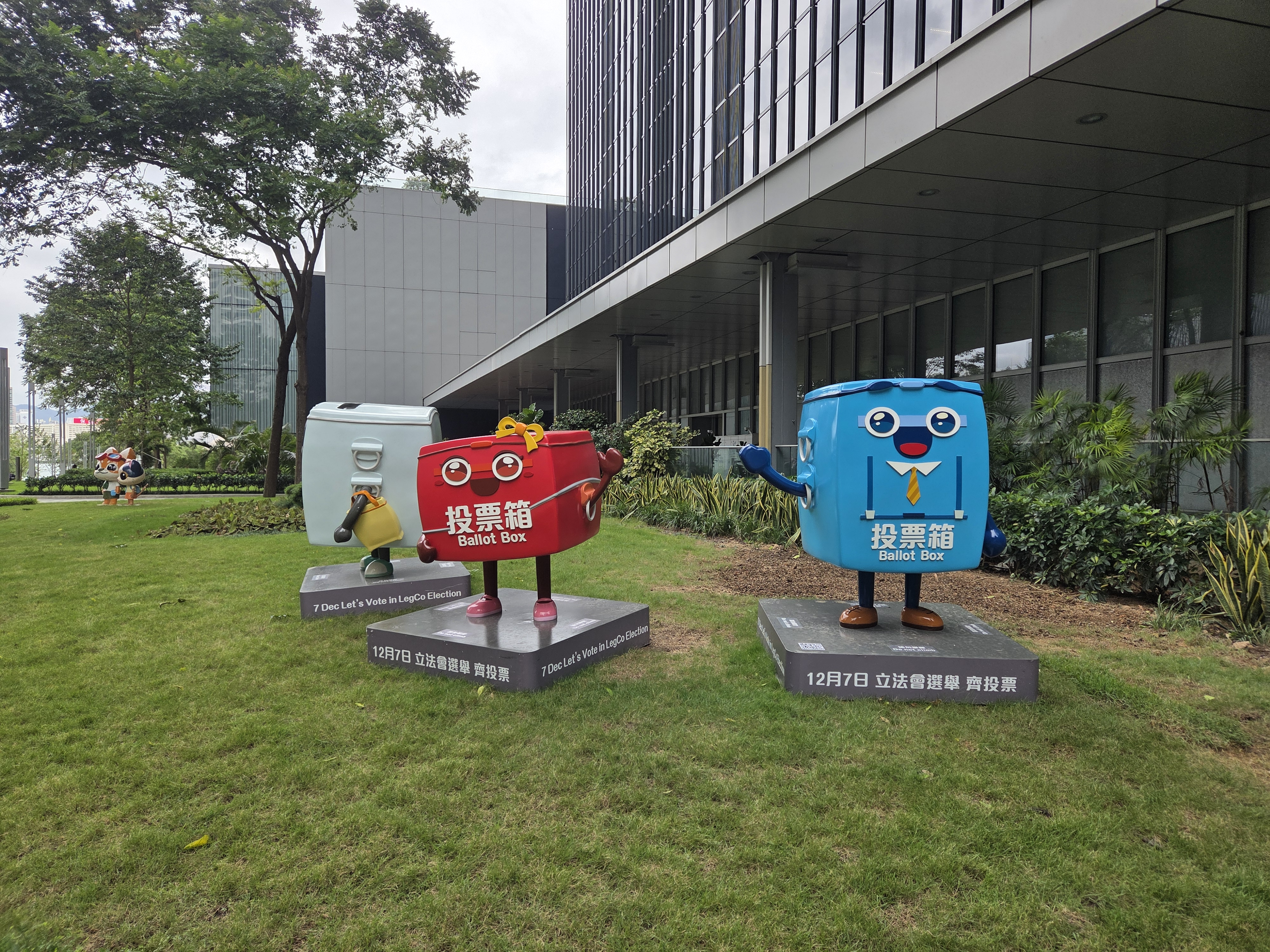
Election publicity outside the government complex

The previous Legislative Council election recorded a historic low turnout of 30.2% despite widespread campaigning. In this election, the government allocated 1.28 billion dollars for advertising, marking an increase of over 50%. Aiming for at least a turnout of 30%, they believed a costly advertising campaign, similar to the 2023 local elections, could be criticized as a waste of public money when the government's deficit remains troublesome. Erick Tsang, Secretary for Constitutional and Mainland Affairs, said the government does not have a benchmark for the turnout.

Four major business chambers – the Chinese General Chamber of Commerce (CGCC), the Chinese Manufacturers' Association of Hong Kong (CMA), the Federation of Hong Kong Industries (FHKI) and the Hong Kong General Chamber of Commerce (HKGCC) – issued a joint statement in early November to incentivise their staff to vote, by pledging to give their workers half-day paid leave. The Travel Industry Council called upon local travel agencies to delay the departure time of their group tours to give travellers enough time to cast their votes.

On 11 November, the Labour and Welfare Bureau announced that it would provide a one-off subsidy of HK$20,000 to elderly centres and district support centres for persons with disabilities for arranging transportation and staff to take elderly people with disabilities and their caregivers to polling stations to vote, and to provide care services to the elderly and persons with disabilities while the caregivers were at polling station.

The Electoral Affairs Commission announced on 14 November that it would, for the first time, set up dedicated polling stations for elderly, disabled, medical staff, ethnic minorities and civil servants and disciplined services personnel on duty on polling day. Three polling stations would also be set up near the boundary at Sheung Shui, the Hong Kong Port of Hong Kong-Zhuhai-Macao Bridge and the Hong Kong International Airport. The voting hours would last 16 hours, extending two more hours from the 2021 election. Secretary for the Civil Service Ingrid Yeung said the bureau had sent instructions to all bureau and department heads to establish a support centre at their respective departments on polling day in order to mobilise over 50,000 civil servants to help out and take all necessary measures to facilitate their voting, with compensation leave or overtime allowance granted for those who were on duty.

== Arrests ==
Hong Kong police arrested over 29 people for alleged criminal damage to posters, in what he said were believed to be separate cases. The National Security Department also arrested a 68-year-old local man for allegedly posting comments on social media encouraging people not to vote or cast invalid ballots in the election. The Independent Commission Against Corruption (ICAC) arrested 11 on suspicion of inciting others not to vote or to cast invalid votes by reposting online posts, and issued arrest warrants for exiled activists Alan Keung Ka-wai, who participated in the exiled pro-independence group Hong Kong Parliament, and Tong Wai-hung, protester who was acquitted of rioting charges in the 2019 Sheung Wan clashes, for allegedly inciting others not to vote in the election. Another was placed on the wanted list on the day of election.

Chief Executive John Lee vowed to take a hard line against any disruptions to the election. Beijing's Hong Kong and Macau Affairs Office also shared a strongly worded commentary urging vigilance against attempts to jeopardise the election, saying that local law enforcement would not "sit back and do nothing". The Office for Safeguarding National Security stated some individuals both inside and outside had launched "various attacks, smears and slanders" against the election, "inciting people not to vote or to cast blank votes" and "deliberately damaging election campaign materials". It criticised "some anti-China and pro-chaos forces" with "evil nature" for attempting to weaken the legitimacy of the new electoral system and democratic development process, endanger Hong Kong's good governance and national security, adding that it firmly supported the Hong Kong government in cracking down on any interference and disruption. It published another statement later accusing the "anti-China and pro-chaos" elements and external forces for their "unrepentant evil intentions" and "unyielding malice", vowing to defend election security and order with a "zero-tolerance" attitude.

== Results ==
Despite massive publicity across the city, The election resulted only in a 31.9% voter turnout—a slight increase from the 2021 election but still lower than the 52.3% turnout in 2016. The total votes cast in the geographical constituencies also decreased from 2021 by 33,000, and registration decreased by 7.64%. The Chinese authorities nonetheless claimed the voter participation "all far surpassed the previous term", adding that the election successfully demonstrated "high-quality democracy" and the results "fully represent the will of Hong Kong people".

DAB emerged as the largest party again, holding 20 seats in the Legislative Council, one more than the last term. The party faced criticism after one of their members was involved in the renovation works at Wang Fuk Court, forcing the party chair to rebut "slander and false accusations". FTU retained their seven seats after their defeat in Election Committee constituency and in direct elections, while BPA continued to rank second with eight seats, one less than last session. NPP's seats halved from 6 to 3, making them the fourth largest and the Liberal Party the third with their four legislators. Professional Power's Christine Fong finally entered Legislative Council on her sixth attempt and topped the geographical constituencies with 58,828 votes.

Summary of the 7 December Legislative Council of Hong Kong election results
Political affiliation	Geographical Constituencies				Functional Constituencies (Note: Labour constituency is not counted due to different voting system used. Vote percentage change is compared to traditional functional constituencies in the last election.)				ECC seats	Total seats	±
Political affiliation	Votes	%	±pp	Seats	Votes	%	±pp	Seats	ECC seats	Total seats	±
Democratic Alliance for the Betterment and Progress of Hong Kong	432,473	33.88	▼17.55	10	4,943	6.86	▼5.41	2	8	20	▲1
Business and Professionals Alliance for Hong Kong	38,602	3.02	N/A	0	4,418	6.13	▼1.91	6	2	8	▲1
Hong Kong Federation of Trade Unions	260,303	20.39	▲5.86	3	N/A	N/A	N/A	2	2	7	▼1
Liberal Party	32,371	2.54	N/A	0	2,471	3.43	▲1.15	3	1	4	Steady
New People's Party	147,113	11.52	▲0.17	2	–	–	–	–	1	3	▼2
Federation of Hong Kong and Kowloon Labour Unions	–	–	–	–	N/A	N/A	N/A	1	1	2	Steady
Hong Kong Federation of Education Workers	–	–	–	–	–	–	–	–	2	2	Steady
Professional Power	58,828	4.61	▲1.72	1	–	–	–	–	–	1	Steady
New Territories Association of Societies	41,657	3.26	N/A	1	–	–	–	–	–	1	N/A
Roundtable	34,756	2.72	▼0.30	1	–	–	–	–	–	1	Steady
Kowloon West New Dynamic	25,692	2.01	▼0.77	1	–	–	–	–	–	1	Steady
Hong Kong Safety Supervisors Association	–	–	–	–	N/A	N/A	N/A	0	–	0	New
Federation of Public Housing Estates	–	–	–	–	–	–	–	–	0	0	N/A
Independents	204,738	16.04	N/A	1	60,191	83.57	N/A	16	23	40	▲3
Total for pro-Beijing camp	1,276,533	100.00	▲6.23	20	72,023	100.00	▲16.14	30	40	90	▲1
Total	1,276,533	100.00		20	72,023	100.00		30	40	90	Steady
Valid votes	1,276,533	96.88			72,023	94.57					
Invalid votes	41,449	3.12	▲1.08		4,136	5.43	▲0.32				
Votes cast / turnout	1,317,682	31.90	▲1.70		76,942 (Note: Labour constituency counted)	40.09	▲7.87				
Registered voters	4,131,298	100.00	▼7.64		191,916	100.00	▼12.29				

=== Defeated incumbents ===
Four incumbents were defeated in this election. Kwok Wai-keung and Luk Chung-hung, who have been lawmakers since 2012 and 2016, failed to secure their foothold in the parliament after defeats in direct elections. Ngan Man-yu lost to another DAB candidate Cheung Pui-kong, and Edmund Wong to an independent.

Party	Candidate	Constituency
FTU (2)	Kwok Wai-keung	Hong Kong Island West
FTU (2)	Luk Chung-hung	New Territories North West
DAB (2)	Ngan Man-yu	Kowloon East
DAB (2)	Edmund Wong	Accountancy

=== Results breakdown ===
An asterisk (*) denotes that the incumbent candidate was seeking re-election.

==== Election Committee constituency (40 seats) ====
Twenty-four incumbents formed an informal pact with the eight candidates who are NPC or CPPCC members (Lau Ka-keung, Wong Kam-leung, Roy Chu, Ginny Man, Ngai Ming-tak, Andrew Fan, Thomas So, and Ma Kwong-yu), hoping to secure stronger support from the Election Committee members.

2025 Legislative Council election: Election Committee
Party	Candidate	Votes	%	±%
Independent	Yiu Pak-leung*	1,397	95.95	
Independent	Chan Hoi-yan*	1,386	95.19	
Independent	Hoey Simon Lee*	1,360	93.41	
Liberal	Michael Lee Chun-keung*	1,354	92.99	
DAB (NTAS)	Ben Chan Han-pan*	1,348	92.58	
Independent	Ngai Ming-tak	1,345	92.38	
DAB	Rock Chen Chung-nin*	1,343	92.24	
Independent	Johnny Ng Kit-chong*	1,331	91.41	
Independent	William Wong Kam-fai*	1,329	91.28	
DAB	Elizabeth Quat*	1,321	91.73	
BPA (KWND)	Priscilla Leung Mei-fun*	1,316	90.38	
FLU	Lam Chun-sing*	1,311	90.04	
Independent	Maggie Chan Man-ki*	1,311	90.04	
Independent	Ginny Man Wing-yee	1,308	89.84	
FEW	Lau Chi-pang*	1,275	87.57	
Independent	Chan Siu-hung*	1,273	87.43	
DAB	Chan Wing-kwong*	1,269	87.16	
Independent	Carmen Kan Wai-mun*	1,268	87.09	
DAB (NTAS)	Steven Ho Chun-yin*	1,267	87.02	
Independent	Junius Ho Kwan-yiu*	1,241	85.23	
Independent	Peter Douglas Koon Ho-ming*	1,233	84.68	
Independent	Lau Ka-keung	1,231	84.55	
NPP	Adrian Pedro Ho King-hong*	1,210	83.10	
FEW	Wong Kam-leung	1,201	82.49	
Independent	Albert Chuang Ka-pun	1,194	82.01	
Independent	Elvin Lee Ka-kui	1,193	81.94	
Independent	Andrew Lam Siu-lo*	1,189	81.66	
FTU	Kingsley Wong Kwok*	1,187	81.52	
Independent (FEW)	Ng Wun-kit (Note: Political affiliation not declared on nomination form)	1,164	79.95	
DAB	Nixie Lam Lam*	1,160	79.67	
Independent	Andrew Fan Chun-wah	1,155	79.33	
DAB	Roy Chu Lap-wai	1,144	78.57	
FTU	Dennis Leung Tsz-wing*	1,089	74.79	
Independent	Thomas So Shiu-tsung	1,076	73.90	
BPA (KWND)	Michelle Tang Ming-sum	1,073	73.70	
Independent	Chan Cho-kwong	1,067	73.28	
Independent	Alan Chan Chung-yee	1,066	73.21	
DAB	Hung Kam-in	1,042	71.57	
Independent	Fan Hoi-kit	1,034	71.02	
Independent	Wu Yingpeng	1,002	68.82	
Independent	Fung Ying-lun	988	67.86	
Independent	Yolanda Ng Yuen-ting	970	66.62	
Independent	Tang Wing-chun	954	65.52	
Independent	Lau Chun-kong	954	65.52	
Independent	Andrew Kwok Chi-wah	947	65.04	
Independent	Chen Shaobo	937	64.35	
FTU	Ma Kwong-yu	934	64.15	
FPHE	Chiu Kwok-wai	887	60.92	
Independent	Kevin Orr Ka-yeung	813	55.84	
FTU	Tsang Chi-man	793	54.46	
Total valid votes		1,456	99.86	
Rejected ballots		2	0.14	
Turnout		1,458	99.45	
Registered electors		1,466		

==== Functional constituencies (30 seats) ====
Constituency	Candidates	Affiliation	Votes	%	Elected
Heung Yee Kuk	Kenneth Lau Ip-keung*	BPA	119	83.80	✓ Re-elected
Heung Yee Kuk	Lau Kai-hong	Independent	23	16.20	
Agriculture and Fisheries	Chan Pok-chi	DAB	82	50.93	✓ Hold for DAB
Agriculture and Fisheries	Yeung Sheung-chun	Independent	79	49.07	
Insurance	Chan Pui-leung*	Independent	48	54.55	✓ Re-elected
Insurance	Simon Lam Yat-tung	Independent	40	45.45	
Transport	Lothair Lam Ming-fung	Independent	162	85.71	✓ Gain from Liberal
Transport	Feng Jiapei	Independent	27	14.29	
Education	Tang Fei*	Independent (FEW)	13,759	55.11	✓ Re-elected
Education	Ray Cheung Chak-chung	Independent (FEW)	11,206	44.89	
Legal	Nicholas Chan Hiu-fung	Liberal	1,543	67.20	✓ Gain from independent
Legal	Virginia Lee Wing-cheung	Independent	753	32.80	
Accountancy	Webster Ng Kam-wah	Independent	4,389	54.81	✓ Gain from DAB
Accountancy	Edmund Wong Chun-sek*	DAB	3,618	45.19	
Medical and Health Services	David Lam Tzit-yuen*	Independent	11,739	70.60	✓ Re-elected
Medical and Health Services	John Leung Lai-yin	Independent	4,889	29.40	
Engineering	Aaron Bok Kwok-ming	BPA	3,058	56.26	✓ Hold for BPA
Engineering	Wilton Fok Wai-tung	Independent	2,377	43.74	
Architectural, Surveying, Planning and Landscape	Julia Lau Man-kwan	Independent	2,157	51.39	✓ Gain from independent
Architectural, Surveying, Planning and Landscape	Francis Lam Ka-fai	Independent	2,040	48.61	
Labour (3 seats)	Chau Siu-chung*	FLU	521	–	✓ Re-elected
Labour (3 seats)	Lam Wai-kong	FTU	506	–	✓ Hold for FTU
Labour (3 seats)	Lee Kwong-yu	FTU	485	–	✓ Hold for FTU
Labour (3 seats)	Tam Kam-lin	SSA (Note: Hong Kong Safety Supervisors Association (HKSSA) is a member of the Federation of Hong Kong and Kowloon Labour Unions)	297	–	
Labour (3 seats)	So Pak-tsan	FTU	281	–	
Social Welfare	Grace Chan Man-yee	Independent	2,179	46.79	✓ Gain from TS
Social Welfare	Fong Fu-fai	Independent	1,755	37.69	
Social Welfare	Chu Lai-ling	DAB	723	15.53	
Real Estate and Construction	Augustine Wong Ho-ming	Independent	316	67.81	✓ Gain from BPA
Real Estate and Construction	Howard Chao	BPA	150	32.19	
Tourism	Vivian Kong Man-wai	Independent	131	85.06	✓ Gain from independent
Tourism	Ma Yat-chiu	Independent	23	14.94	
Commercial (First)	Jonathan Stuart Lamport	BPA	404	58.81	✓ Hold for BPA
Commercial (First)	Felix Lee Kar-chung	Independent	283	41.19	
Commercial (Second)	Andrew Yao Cho-fai	Independent	194	85.46	✓ Gain from independent
Commercial (Second)	Ivan Wong Siu-kei	Independent	33	14.54	
Commercial (Third)	Erik Yim Kong*	Independent	199	65.25	✓ Re-elected
Commercial (Third)	Cheung Ki-tang	DAB	106	34.75	
Industrial (First)	Ray Wong Wing-wai	BPA	153	64.02	✓ Hold for BPA
Industrial (First)	Terrence Hui Man-chun	BPA	86	35.98	
Industrial (Second)	Jimmy Ng Wing-ka*	BPA	246	79.87	✓ Re-elected
Industrial (Second)	Wong Wai-leung	Independent	62	20.13	
Finance	Chan Chun-ying*	Independent	42	56.00	✓ Re-elected
Finance	Ip Tsz-kin	Independent	33	44.00	
Financial Services	Robert Lee Wai-wang*	Independent	227	58.35	✓ Re-elected
Financial Services	Lian Shaodong	Independent	162	41.65	
Sports, Performing Arts, Culture and Publication	Kenneth Fok Kai-kong*	Independent	193	85.02	✓ Re-elected
Sports, Performing Arts, Culture and Publication	Lo Kwong-ping	Independent	34	14.98	
Import and Export	Chung Ki-fung	Independent	137	55.92	✓ Gain from DAB
Import and Export	Sophia Lee Shuk-woon	Independent	108	44.08	
Textiles and Garment	Sunny Tan*	BPA	202	87.45	✓ Re-elected
Textiles and Garment	Shiu King-wah	Independent	29	12.55	
Wholesale and Retail	Peter Shiu Ka-fai*	Liberal	827	84.73	✓ Re-elected
Wholesale and Retail	Annie Tse Yau On-yee	Independent	149	15.27	
Technology and Innovation	Duncan Chiu*	Independent	65	91.55	✓ Re-elected
Technology and Innovation	Mak Hin-yu	Independent	6	8.45	
Catering	Jonathan Leung Chun	Liberal	101	82.11	✓ Hold for Liberal
Catering	Maurice Kong Chi-hang	Independent	22	17.89	
HKSAR members of NPC and CPPCC, representatives of national organisations	Chan Yung*	DAB/NTAS	414	77.38	✓ Re-elected
HKSAR members of NPC and CPPCC, representatives of national organisations	Lai Tat-shing	Independent	121	22.62	

==== Geographical constituencies (20 seats) ====
Constituency	Candidates	Affiliation	Votes	%	Elected
Hong Kong Island East	Stanley Ng Chau-pei*	FTU	39,707	33.86	✓ Re-elected
Hong Kong Island East	Elaine Chik Kit-ling	DAB	22,054	18.81	✓ Hold for DAB
Hong Kong Island East	Kenny Yuen Kin-chung	Liberal	21,696	18.50	
Hong Kong Island East	Annie Lee Ching-har	DAB	16,458	14.04	
Hong Kong Island East	Calvin Kwok Ho-king	NPP	17,344	14.79	
Hong Kong Island West	Chan Hok-fung*	DAB	30,543	29.29	✓ Re-elected
Hong Kong Island West	Judy Chan Kapui*	NPP	30,033	28.80	✓ Hold for NPP & Re-elected
Hong Kong Island West	Kwok Wai-keung*	FTU	25,643	24.59	
Hong Kong Island West	Jeremy Young Chit-on	Liberal	10,675	10.24	
Hong Kong Island West	Joyce Wong Chau-ping	Independent	7,384	7.08	
Kowloon East	Bill Tang Ka-piu*	FTU	53,675	38.41	✓ Re-elected
Kowloon East	Cheung Pui-kong	DAB	29,116	20.84	✓ Hold for DAB
Kowloon East	Leung Sze-wan	Independent	28,834	20.64	
Kowloon East	Ngan Man-yu*	DAB	24,250	17.35	
Kowloon East	Jeffrey Chan Chun-hung	Independent (PoD)	3,855	2.76	
Kowloon West	Vincent Cheng Wing-shun*	DAB	41,767	40.14	✓ Re-elected
Kowloon West	Scott Leung Man-kwong*	KWND	25,692	24.69	✓ Re-elected
Kowloon West	Lau Oi-sze	Independent	15,708	15.10	
Kowloon West	Haywood Guan Weixi	Independent	13,592	13.06	
Kowloon West	Jeffrey Pong Chiu-fai	BPA	7,285	7.00	
Kowloon Central	Starry Lee Wai-king*	DAB	53,529	41.16	✓ Re-elected
Kowloon Central	Kitson Yang Wing-kit*	Independent	28,161	21.65	✓ Re-elected
Kowloon Central	Yeung Nok-hin	Independent	15,734	12.10	
Kowloon Central	Yau Yiu-sing	FTU	12,527	9.63	
Kowloon Central	Tam Lee-yee	Independent	12,487	9.60	
Kowloon Central	Lee Chiu-yu	BPA	7,615	5.86	
New Territories South East	Christine Fong Kwok-shan	PP	58,828	42.26	✓ Hold for PP
New Territories South East	Chris Ip Ngo-tung	DAB	26,250	18.86	✓ Hold for DAB
New Territories South East	Victor Chan Chi-ho	NPP/CF	18,797	13.50	
New Territories South East	Chris Cheung Mei-hung	Independent	18,681	13.42	
New Territories South East	Janet Lee Ching-yee	FTU	16,636	11.95	
New Territories North	Tam Chun-kwok	NTAS	41,657	33.25	✓ Gain from New Prospect
New Territories North	Yiu Ming	DAB	33,389	26.65	✓ Hold for DAB
New Territories North	Wilson Shum Ho-kit	Independent	22,415	17.89	
New Territories North	Kent Tsang King-chung	FTU	17,930	14.31	
New Territories North	Michael Liu Tsz-chung	NPP/CF	9,880	7.89	
New Territories North West	Holden Chow Ho-ding*	DAB	42,347	30.64	✓ Re-elected
New Territories North West	Mark Chong Ho-fung	Roundtable	34,756	25.15	✓ Hold for Roundtable
New Territories North West	Leung Ming-kin	Independent	25,936	18.77	
New Territories North West	Luk Chung-hung*	FTU	23,282	16.84	
New Territories North West	Kam Man-fung	NPP	11,893	8.60	
New Territories South West	Joephy Chan Wing-yan*	FTU	52,900	35.54	✓ Re-elected
New Territories South West	Jody Kwok Fu-yung	DAB	37,020	24.87	✓ Hold for DAB
New Territories South West	Lo Yuen-ting	DAB	34,138	22.93	
New Territories South West	Marcella Cheung Man-ka	NPP	16,417	11.03	
New Territories South West	Mok Yee-ki	BPA	8,383	5.63	
New Territories North East	Dominic Lee Tsz-king*	NPP/CF	42,749	32.98	✓ Re-elected
New Territories North East	Gary Chan Hak-kan*	DAB/NTAS	41,612	32.10	✓ Re-elected
New Territories North East	Ku Wai-ping	FTU	18,003	13.89	
New Territories North East	Calvin Tang Siu-fung	BPA	15,319	11.82	
New Territories North East	Allan Wong Wing-ho	Independent (PoD)	11,951	9.22	

== Analysis ==
The sweeping change in the composition of the Legislative Council, with at least 40% set to be first-time members, paved way for Beijing to replace the traditional establishment nurtured during the colonial era with younger and more disciplined loyalists, as well as mainland Chinese who would coordinate more closely. The election also signaled a defeat for Hong Kong drifters (gang piao, young, educated migrants from mainland China) and moderates, after three legislators from the former camp (Gary Zhang, Shang Hailong, and Wendy Hong) chose to serve only one term, and the moderate Third Side failed to gather enough nominations. The new session would also be composed of more "national team" members, meaning managers from Chinese enterprises or state-run companies. Separately, more than two dozen NPC members and two dozen CPPCC members joining the race at a time when more local elites were getting involved in national politics has resulted in a "revolving door" phenomenon.On the other hand, the Chinese government praised the candidates as "outstanding talent", and stressed that the candidates will provide voters with choice and enable them to pick "the best from the best".
