= Chris Ip =

Hong Kong politician

The Honourable Chris Ip
- 葉傲冬
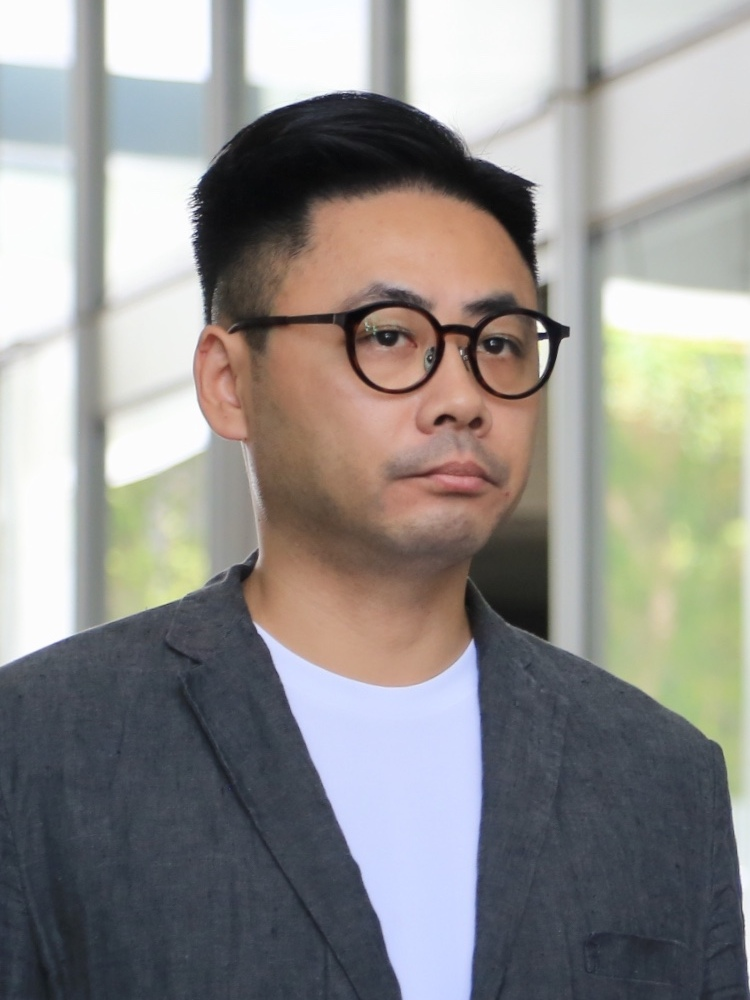
- Ip in 2019

Member of the Legislative Council
- Designate
- Assumed office 1 January 2026
- Preceded by: Stanley Li

Chairman of the Yau Tsim Mong District Council
- In office 4 January 2016 – 31 December 2019
- Preceded by: Chung Kong-mo
- Succeeded by: Lam Kin-man

Member of the Yau Tsim Mong District Council
- Incumbent
- Assumed office 1 January 2024
- Succeeded by: New constituency
- Constituency: Yau Tsim Mong South
- In office 6 October 2008 – 31 December 2019
- Preceded by: David Lau Chi-wing
- Succeeded by: Chan Tsz-wai
- Constituency: Jordan East (until 2015); Jordan South (since 2016)

Personal details
- Born: Ip Ngo-tung; 23 July 1980 (age 45) Hong Kong
- Relations: Ip Kwok-him (uncle)

Chris Ip Ngo-tung BBS JP (Chinese: 葉傲冬, born 1980) is a Hong Kong politician from the pro-Beijing camp. He is a current member of the Legislative Council from 2026, having served as a district councillor of Yau Tsim Mong District for over a decade.

== Career ==
Ip's father is the former Urban Council member Ip Kwok-chung, whose twin brother is the pro-Beijing heavyweight Ip Kwok-him. Ip Kwok-chung was the Yau Tsim Mong District Council member, representing Ferry Point (later renamed Jordan West), from 1985 and until 2003. Five years later, Chris Ip was elected in a by-election to serve as the district councillor for the neighbouring Jordan East constituency. He was re-elected in the subsequent poll and in 2016 elected to become the chairman of Yau Tsim Mong District Council. However, he lost his seat in 2019, during the massive protest, to pro-democracy newcomer Chan Tsz-wai who previously had no experience in politics, making it one of the most famous defeats in the election.

After the election, Ip, who was an assignment editor at Wen Wei Po, returned to the mouthpiece of Beijing authorities as the assistant chief editor in 2020. He was appointed to the Area Committee along with many defeated councillors later that year. There were rumours that Ip could become the Under Secretary for Constitutional and Mainland Affairs in 2021 amidst the cabinet reshuffle, but eventually did not come true. He also left Wen Wei Po afterwards and became company director. With the imposition of the national security-driven electoral revamp, Ip returned to the district council after the 2023 election. Ip also became the secretary-general of the Democratic Alliance for the Betterment and Progress of Hong Kong in 2023.

Ip was elevated further in 2025 with his victory in the Legislative Council election at New Territories South East constituency, succeeding Stanley Li.
