= Hoi Nam (constituency) =

Electoral constituency in Hong Kong

- Elected constituency for the Sha Tin District Council
- Boundary of Hoi Nam in Sai Kung District
- District: Sha Tin
- Legislative Council constituency: New Territories South East
- Population: 12,926 (2019)
- Electorate: 5,909 (2019)

Current constituency
- Created: 2019
- Number of members: One
- Member: Vacant
- Created from: Chung On, On Tai

Hoi Nam is one of the 41 constituencies in the Sha Tin District, one of the 18 districts of Hong Kong.

Created for the 2019 District Council elections, the constituency returns one district councillor to the Sha Tin District Council, with an election every four years.

Hoi Nam loosely covers residential flats in Baycrest, La Costa, Ocean View, Oceanaire and Sausalito in Ma On Shan. It has projected population of 12,926.

== Councillors represented ==
| Election | Member | Party |
|---|---|---|
| 2019 | Mike Chan Pui-ming→Vacant | Civic |

== Election results ==
=== 2010s ===
Sha Tin District Council Election, 2019: Hoi Nam
| Party | Candidate | Votes | % | ±% |
|---|---|---|---|---|
| Civic | Mike Chan Pui-ming | 3,019 | 65.15 | |
| Independent | Natasha Yu | 1,615 | 34.85 | |
| Majority | | 1,404 | 30.30 | |
| Turnout | | 4,654 | 78.77 | |
| Civic win (new seat) | | | | |
