= Jordan Valley (constituency) =

Hong Kong constituency

- Elected constituency for the Kwun Tong District Council
- Boundary of in Kwun Tong District
- District: Kwun Tong
- Legislative Council constituency: Kowloon East
- Population: 20,297 (2019)
- Electorate: 10,510 (2019)

Current constituency
- Created: 1994
- Number of members: One
- Member: Ngan Man-yu (DAB)

Jordan Valley
- Traditional Chinese: 佐敦谷
Transcriptions
Yue: Cantonese
- Yale Romanization: Jó dēun gūk
- Jyutping: Zo2 deon1 guk1

Jordan Valley is one of the 37 constituencies in the Kwun Tong District of Hong Kong which was created in 1991.

The constituency has an estimated population of 20,297.

== Councillors represented ==
Election	Member	Party
1994	Szeto Chak	123 Democratic Alliance
1999	Alice Lee Ling	Democratic
2007	Wong Wai-tag	Democratic
2011	Ngan Man-yu	DAB

== Election results ==
=== 2010s ===
Kwun Tong District Council Election, 2019: Jordan Valley
Party	Candidate	Votes	%	±%
DAB	Ngan Man-yu	3,694	50.92	
Nonpartisan	Wong Ka-lok	3,560	49.08	
Majority		134	1.84	
Turnout		7,281	69.34	
DAB hold		Swing		
