= O Tong (constituency) =

Constituency of the Sai Kung District Council of Hong Kong

- Elected constituency for the Sai Kung District Council
- Boundary of O Tong in Sai Kung District
- District: Sai Kung
- Legislative Council constituency: New Territories South East
- Population: 17,578 (2019)
- Electorate: 10,068 (2019)

Current constituency
- Created: 2007
- Number of members: One
- Member: vacant
- Created from: Tseung Kwan O Town Centre

O Tong (Chinese: 澳唐) is one of the 29 constituencies of the Sai Kung District Council in Hong Kong. The seat elects one member of the council every four years.

Since its creation in 2007, the boundary of the constituency is loosely based on the area of Tong Ming Court and Park Central in Tseung Kwan O.

== Councillors represented ==
| Election | Member | Party |
|---|---|---|
| 2007 | Cheung Kwok-keung | Democratic→Neo Democrats |
| 2011 | Cheung Kwok-keung | Neo Democrats |
| 2015 | Lui Man-kwong→Vacant | Neo Democrats |
| 2019 | Lui Man-kwong→Vacant | Neo Democrats→Independent |

== Election results ==
=== 2010s ===
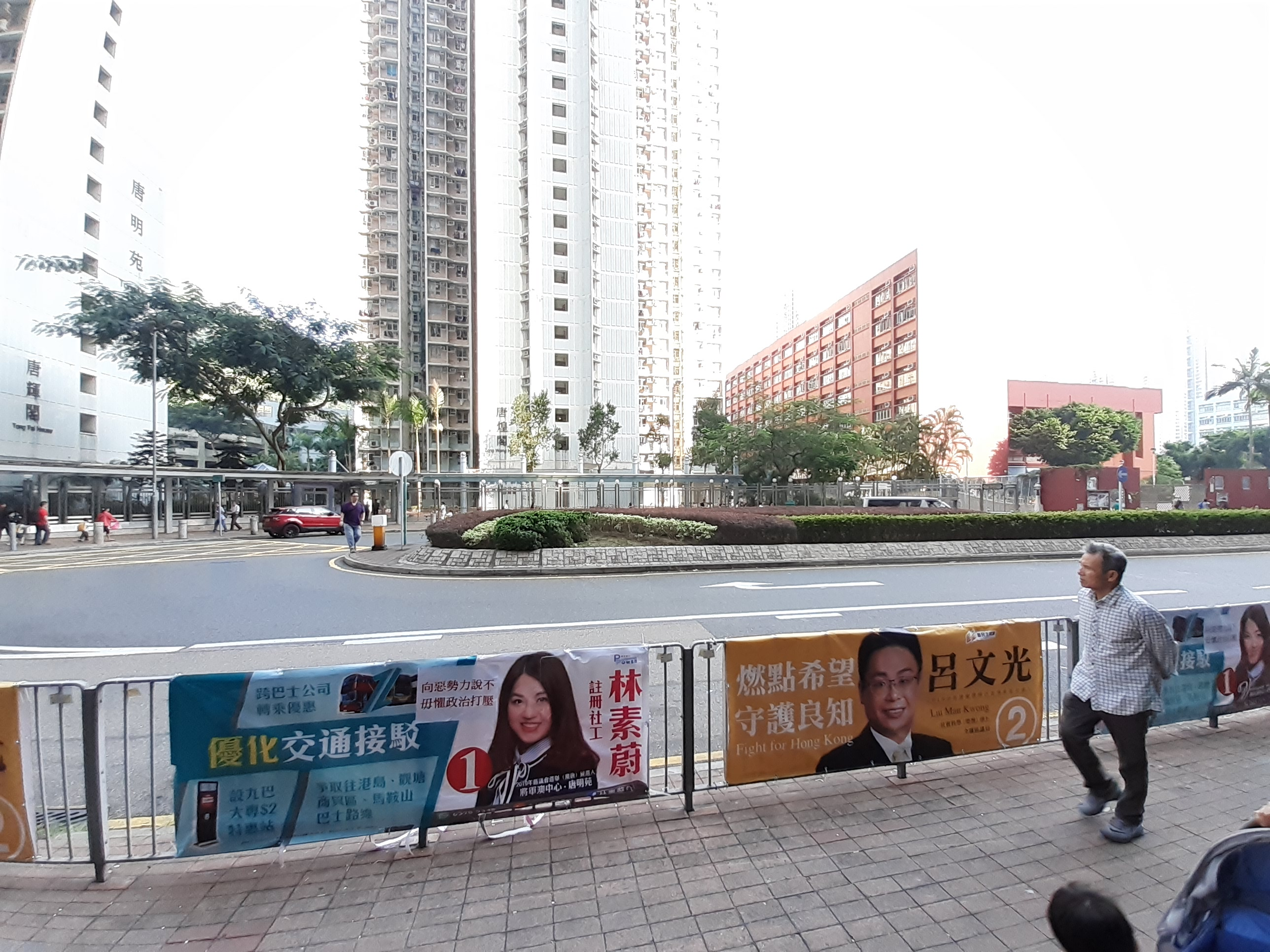
Election banners in the 2019 District Council elections.

Sai Kung District Council Election, 2019: O Tong
| Party | Candidate | Votes | % | ±% |
|---|---|---|---|---|
| Neo Democrats | Lui Man-kwong | 4,722 | 63.09 | +19.03 |
| Independent | Lam So-wai | 2,762 | 36.91 | |
| Majority | | 1,960 | 26.18 | |
| Turnout | | 7,515 | 74.67 | |
| Neo Democrats hold | | Swing | | |

Sai Kung District Council Election, 2015: O Tong
| Party | Candidate | Votes | % | ±% |
|---|---|---|---|---|
| Neo Democrats | Lui Man-kwong | 1,831 | 43.79 | −26.63 |
| Independent | Au Yeung Ho-kwan | 1,314 | 31.43 | |
| FTU | Ko Wing-luen | 1,036 | 24.78 | |
| Majority | | 517 | 12.36 | |
| Turnout | | 4,181 | 46.57 | |
| Neo Democrats hold | | Swing | | |

Sai Kung District Council Election, 2011: O Tong
| Party | Candidate | Votes | % | ±% |
|---|---|---|---|---|
| Neo Democrats | Cheung Kwok-keung | 2,197 | 70.42 | −1.41 |
| NPP | Tim Lo Man-him | 923 | 29.58 | |
| Majority | | 1,274 | 40.84 | |
| Turnout | | 3,120 | 37.92 | |
| Neo Democrats hold | | Swing | | |

=== 2000s ===
Sai Kung District Council Election, 2007: O Tong
| Party | Candidate | Votes | % | ±% |
|---|---|---|---|---|
| Democratic | Cheung Kwok-keung | 1,846 | 71.83 | |
| Liberal | Alfred Chan Man-hang | 988 | 28.17 | |
| Majority | | 858 | 43.66 | |
| Democratic win (new seat) | | | | |
