= Chi Choi (constituency) =

Hong Kong constituency

- Elected constituency for the Wong Tai Sin District Council
- Boundary of Chi Choi in Wong Tai Sin District
- District: Wong Tai Sin
- Legislative Council constituency: Kowloon East
- Population: 16,202 (2019)
- Electorate: 9,463 (2019)

Current constituency
- Created: 1999
- Number of members: One
- Member: (Vacant)
- Created from: Choi Hung; Choi Wan; King Fu

Chi Choi
- Traditional Chinese: 池彩
Transcriptions
Yue: Cantonese
- Yale Romanization: Chìh chói
- Jyutping: Ci4 coi2

Chi Choi is one of the 25 constituencies in the Wong Tai Sin District in Hong Kong. The constituency returns one district councillor to the Wong Tai Sin District Council, with an election every four years.

Chi Choi constituency is loosely based on Kingsford Terrace, Sun Lai Garden, Bay View Garden, Ngau Chi Wan Village and part of Choi Hung Estate in Ngau Chi Wan with an estimated population of 16,202.

== Councillors represented ==
Election	Member	Party
1999	Ho Yin-fai	DAB/FTU
2015	Wu Chi-kin→vacant	Democratic

== Election results ==
=== 2010s ===
Wong Tai Sin District Council Election, 2019: Chi Choi
Party	Candidate	Votes	%	±%
Democratic	Wu Chi-kin	4,055	58.67	+8.61
FTU	So Ka-lok	2,856	41.33	−8.61
Majority		1,199	17.34	
Turnout		6,942	73.37	
Democratic hold		Swing		

Wong Tai Sin District Council Election, 2015: Chi Choi
Party	Candidate	Votes	%	±%
Democratic	Wu Chi-kin	2,083	50.06	+4.63
DAB (FTU)	Ho Yin-fai	2,078	49.94	−4.63
Majority		5	0.12	
Turnout		4,161	48.17	
Democratic gain from DAB		Swing	+4.63	

Wong Tai Sin District Council Election, 2011: Chi Choi
Party	Candidate	Votes	%	±%
DAB (FTU)	Ho Yin-fai	1,712	54.57	−10.78
Democratic	Dickens Chui Ka-chun	1,425	45.43	
Majority		287	9.14	
Turnout		3,137	40.62	
DAB hold		Swing		

=== 2000s ===
Wong Tai Sin District Council Election, 2007: Chi Choi
Party	Candidate	Votes	%	±%
FTU (DAB)	Ho Yin-fai	1,473	65.35	+6.40
Frontier	Tsui Wai-ki	781	35.65	
Majority		692	29.70	
FTU hold		Swing		

Wong Tai Sin District Council Election, 2003: Chi Choi
Party	Candidate	Votes	%	±%
DAB	Ho Yin-fai	1,657	58.95	−5.68
Independent	Yim Yuk-lun	1,154	40.05	
Majority		503	18.90	
DAB hold		Swing		

=== 1990s ===
Wong Tai Sin District Council Election, 1999: Chi Choi
Party	Candidate	Votes	%	±%
DAB	Ho Yin-fai	1,911	64.63	
Nonpartisan	Chow Kwun-man	1,046	35.37	
Majority		865	29.26	
DAB win (new seat)				
