= Choi Wan West (constituency) =

Hong Kong constituency

- Elected constituency for the Wong Tai Sin District Council
- Boundary of Choi Wan West in Wong Tai Sin District
- District: Wong Tai Sin
- Legislative Council constituency: Kowloon East
- Population: 13,371 (2019)
- Electorate: 9,099 (2019)

Current constituency
- Created: 1999
- Number of members: One
- Member: (Vacant)

Choi Wan West
- Traditional Chinese: 彩雲西
Transcriptions
Yue: Cantonese
- Yale Romanization: Chói wàhn sāi
- Jyutping: Coi5 wan4 sai1

Choi Wan West is one of the 25 constituencies in the Wong Tai Sin District in Hong Kong. The constituency returns one district councillor to the Wong Tai Sin District Council, with an election every four years.

The constituency has an estimated population of 13,371.

== Councillors represented ==
Election	Member	Party
1999	Chui Pak-tai	Frontier
2008	Chui Pak-tai	Democratic
2011	Tam Mei-po	DAB/FTU
2019	Chan Lee-shing→vacant	Democratic

== Election results ==
=== 2010s ===
Wong Tai Sin District Council Election, 2019: Choi Wan West
Party	Candidate	Votes	%	±%
Democratic	Chan Lee-shing	3,501	54.39	
FTU (DAB)	Tam Mei-po	2,936	45.61	
Majority		565	8.78	
Turnout		6,491	71.38	
Democratic gain from FTU		Swing		
