= Heng On (constituency) =

Hong Kong constituency

- Elected constituency for the Sha Tin District Council
- Boundary of Heng On in Sha Tin District
- District: Sha Tin
- Legislative Council constituency: New Territories South East
- Population: 19,833 (2019)
- Electorate: 15,819 (2019)

Current constituency
- Created: 1994
- Number of members: One
- Member: Vacant

Heng On
- Traditional Chinese: 恒安
Transcriptions
Yue: Cantonese
- Yale Romanization: Hàhng ōn
- Jyutping: Hang4 on1

Heng On is one of the 36 constituencies of the Sha Tin District Council in Hong Kong. The seat elects one member of the council every four years. The constituency has an estimated population of 19,833.

== Councillors represented ==
Election	Member	Party
1994	Chan To-yeung	Democratic
199?	Chan To-yeung	Nonpartisan
1999	Cheng Tsuk-man→Vacant	Frontier
2009	Cheng Tsuk-man→Vacant	Democratic

== Election results ==
=== 2010s ===
Sha Tin District Council Election, 2019: Heng On
Party	Candidate	Votes	%	±%
Democratic	Cheng Tsuk-man	6,824	63.56	
FTU	Fang Hao-liang	3,970	36.44	
Majority		2,854	27.12	
Turnout		10,836	68.52	
Democratic hold		Swing		
