= Stanley Li =

Hong Kong politician

The Honourable Stanley Li MH
- 李世榮
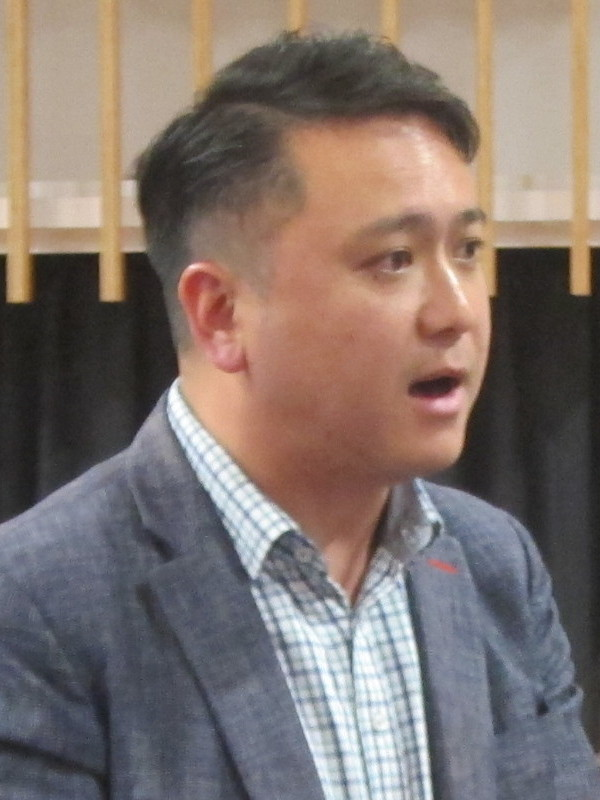

Member of the Legislative Council
- Incumbent
- Assumed office 1 January 2022 Serving with Connie Lam
- Preceded by: Constituency created
- Constituency: New Territories South East

Personal details
- Born: August 12, 1983 (age 43) Hong Kong
- Party: DAB
- Education: Jinan University (BAdm); Sun Yat-sen University (MPA)

Stanley Li Sai-wing, MH (Chinese: 李世榮) is a Hong Kong DAB politician who is the elected Legislative Council member for New Territories South East.

== Electoral history ==
2021 legislative election: New Territories South East
Party	Candidate	Votes	%	±%
DAB	Li Sai-wing	82,595	64.77	N/A
PP	Lam So-wai	38,214	29.97	N/A
Independent	Shum Ho-kit	6,718	5.27	N/A
Majority				
Total valid votes		127,527		
Turnout				
DAB win (new seat)				
PP win (new seat)				
