= Ngan Man-yu =

Hong Kong politician (born 1986)

The Honourable Ngan Man-yu
- 顏汶羽
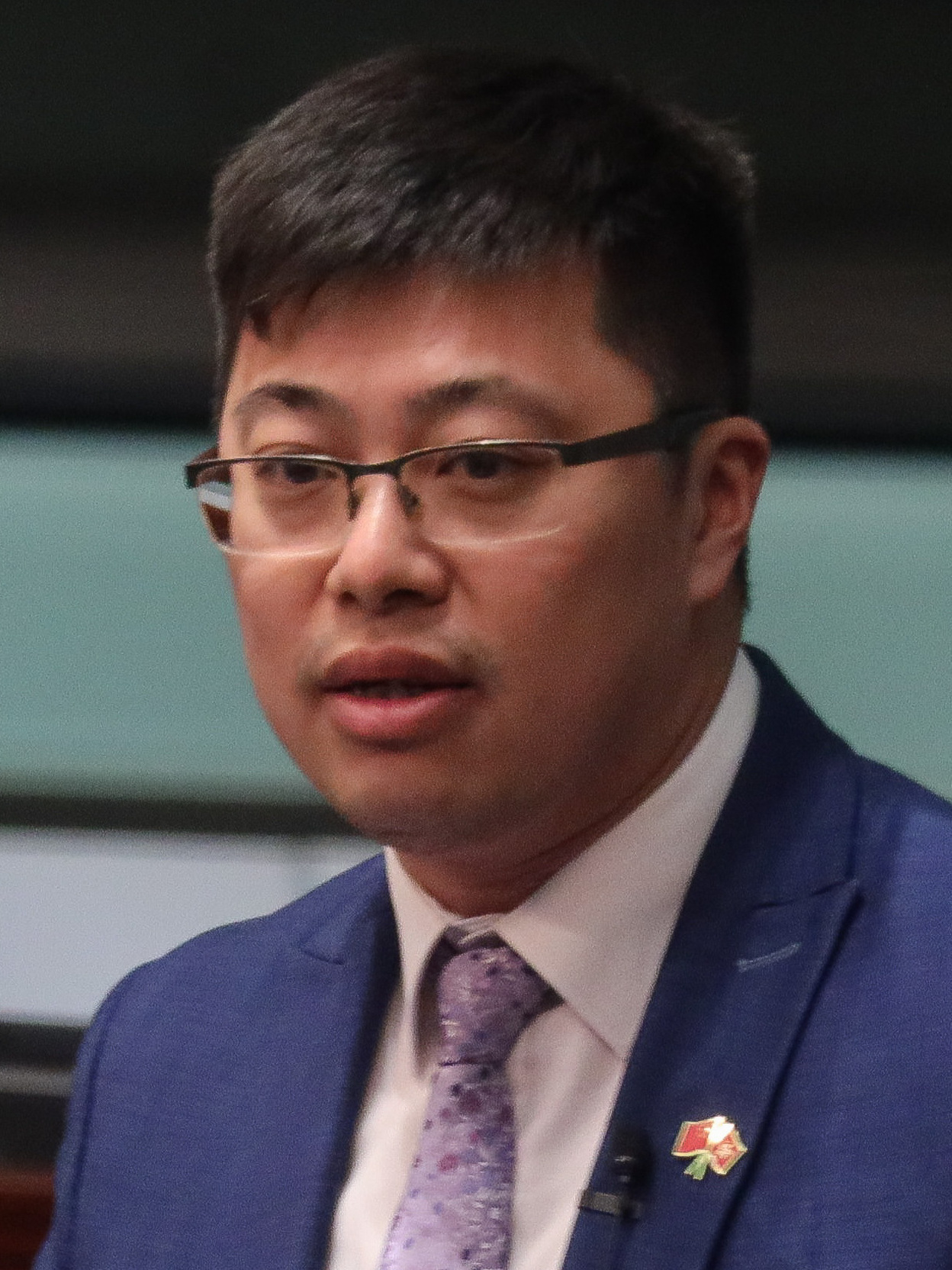
- Ngan in 2023

Member of the Legislative Council
- In office 1 January 2022 – 31 December 2025
- Preceded by: New constituency
- Succeeded by: Cheung Pui-kong
- Constituency: Kowloon East

Member of the Kwun Tong District Council
- In office 1 January 2012 – 31 December 2023
- Preceded by: Wong Wai-tag
- Succeeded by: Constituency abolished
- Constituency: Jordan Valley

Personal details
- Born: 31 August 1986 (age 40)
- Party: Democratic Alliance for the Betterment and Progress of Hong Kong (DAB)
- Education: Lingnan University; City University of Hong Kong

Frankie Ngan Man-yu (Chinese: 顏汶羽; born 31 August 1986) is a Hong Kong politician. He is a former member of the Legislative Council of Hong Kong for Kowloon East constituency and former member of the Kwun Tong District Council for Jordan Valley, representing Democratic Alliance for the Betterment and Progress of Hong Kong (DAB).

== Biography ==
Ngan graduated from the Lingnan University with a Bachelor of Social Sciences and obtained a Master of Arts in Public Policy & Management from City University of Hong Kong. He received a doctoral degree of Policy Studies at Lingnan University.

He was first elected to the Kwun Tong District Council through Jordan Valley in the 2011 District Council election. Through the Hong Kong and Kowloon District Councils subsector, he was elected to the Election Committee in 2021.

Ngan was selected by the Democratic Alliance for the Betterment and Progress of Hong Kong (DAB) to run in Kowloon East in the 2021 Legislative Council election, in which he received 64,275 votes and gained the second seat in the constituency. He ran for re-election in 2025, but was defeated due to vote split, only received 24,250 votes, making him one of the four incumbents that lost the seat. He was succeeded by another DAB member Cheung Pui-kong.

Political offices
Preceded by Wong Wai-tat	Member of the Kwun Tong District Council; Representative for Jordan Valley; 2012–2023	Succeeded by Constituency abolished
Legislative Council of Hong Kong
New constituency	Member of Legislative Council; Representative for Kowloon East; 2022–2025	Succeeded by Cheung Pui-kong
