= Park Central (Hong Kong) =

Housing estate in Tseung Kwan O, Hong Kong

Coordinates: 22°18′26″N 114°15′26″E

Park Central 將軍澳中心

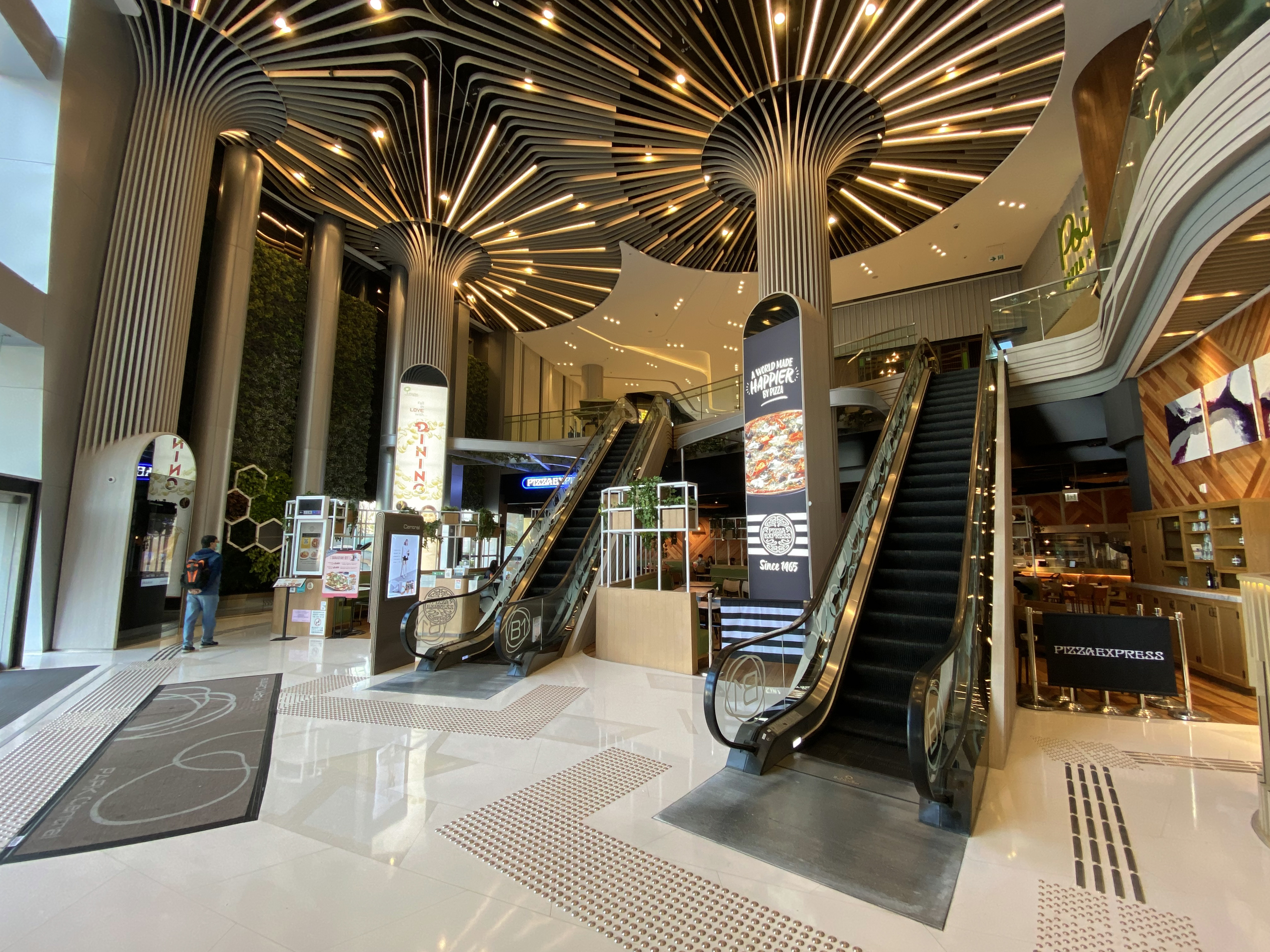

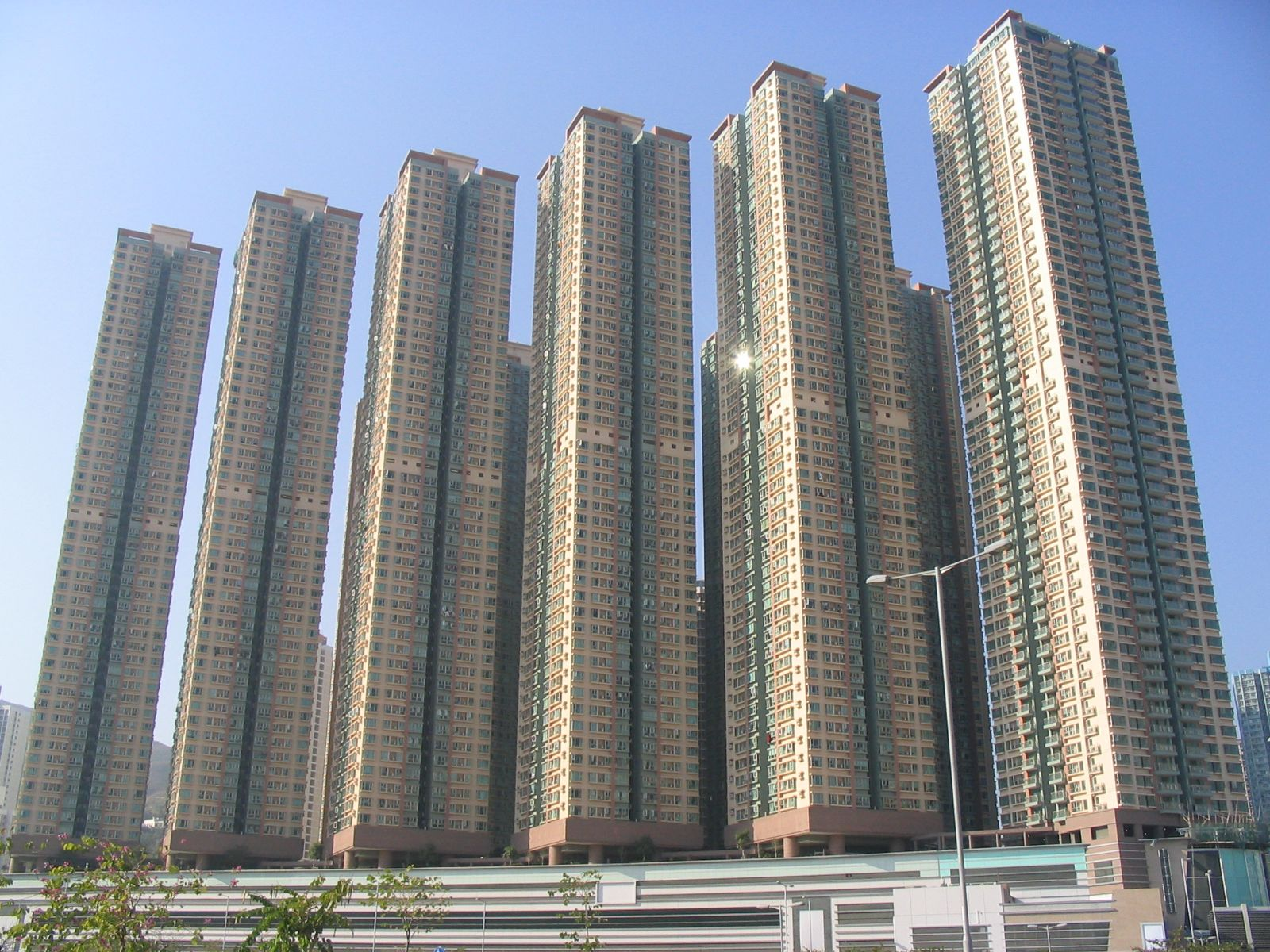
Park Central

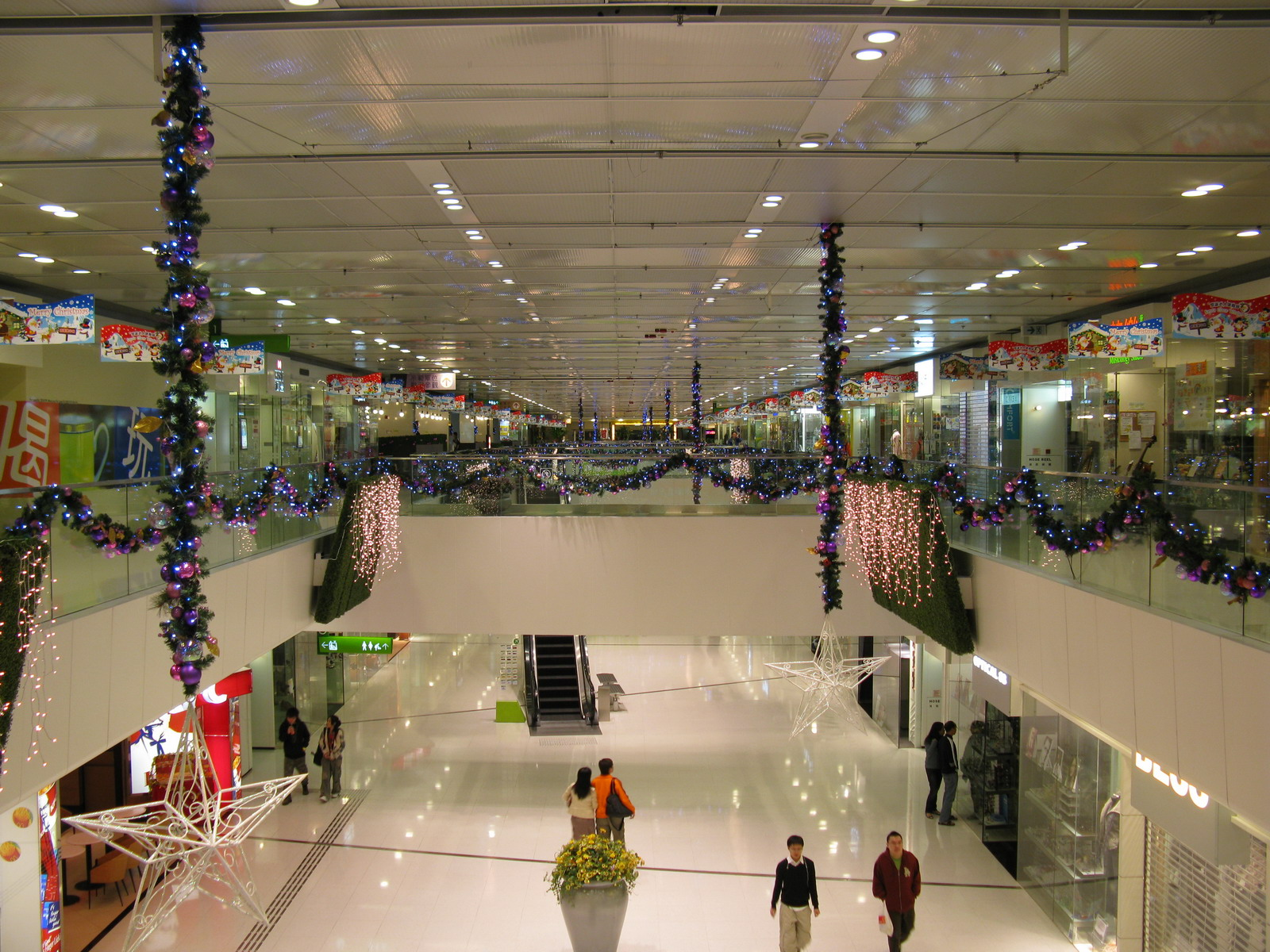
Shopping mall of Park Central (Before renovation)

Park Central (Chinese: 將軍澳中心) is a private housing estate and shopping mall in Tseung Kwan O, New Territories, Hong Kong, located near MTR Tseung Kwan O station. It consists of 12 residential blocks in two phases with a total of 4,152 units, and a 350,000-square-foot (33,000 m^{2}) shopping mall, the largest one in Tseung Kwan O. It was jointly developed in 2002, 2003 and 2005 by the consortium of property developers, including Sun Hung Kai Properties, Henderson Land Development, Chinachem Group, MTR Corporation and Nan Fung Group.

== Demographics ==
According to the 2016 by-census, Park Central had a population of 12,338. The median age was 38.7 and the majority of residents (92.2 per cent) were of Chinese ethnicity. The average household size was 2.9 people. The median monthly household income of all households (i.e. including both economically active and inactive households) was HK$55,000.

== Politics ==
Park Central is located in O Tong constituency of the Sai Kung District Council. It was formerly represented by Lui Man-kwong, who was elected in the 2019 elections until July 2021.
