= Choi Wan South (constituency) =

Constituency of the Wong Tai Sin District Council, Hong Kong

- Elected constituency for the Wong Tai Sin District Council
- Boundary of Choi Wan South in Wong Tai Sin District
- District: Wong Tai Sin
- Legislative Council constituency: Kowloon East
- Population: 12,568 (2019)
- Electorate: 8,110 (2019)

Current constituency
- Created: 1999
- Number of members: One
- Member: (Vacant)

Choi Wan South
- Traditional Chinese: 彩雲南
Transcriptions
Yue: Cantonese
- Yale Romanization: Chói wàhn nàahm
- Jyutping: Coi2 wan4 naam4

Choi Wan South is one of the 25 constituencies of the Wong Tai Sin District Council. The seat elects one member of the council every four years. Since its creation in 1999, the seat has continuously been held by the Democratic Party, and was held by Shum Wan-wa.

== Councillors represented ==
Election	Member	Party
1999	Chan Lee-shing	Democratic
2011	Shum Wan-wa→vacant	Democratic

== Election results ==
=== 2010s ===
Wong Tai Sin District Council Election, 2015: Choi Wan South
Party	Candidate	Votes	%	±%
Democratic	Shum Wan-wa	3,335	58.01	−6.79
DAB	Kong King-san	2,414	41.99	+6.79
Majority		921	16.02	
Turnout		5,766	71.13	
Democratic hold		Swing		

Wong Tai Sin District Council Election, 2015: Choi Wan South
Party	Candidate	Votes	%	±%
Democratic	Shum Wan-wa	2,432	64.8	–2.5
DAB	Li Mei-lan	1,321	35.2	+2.5
Majority		1,111	29.6	–5.0
Turnout		3,797	51.6	
Democratic hold		Swing	–2.5	

Wong Tai Sin District Council Election, 2011: Choi Wan South
Party	Candidate	Votes	%	±%
Democratic	Shum Wan-wa	2,244	67.3	+17.2
DAB	Anderson Cheung Sze-chun	1,088	32.7	−17.2
Majority		1,156	34.6	+33.6
Democratic hold		Swing		

=== 2000s ===
Wong Tai Sin District Council Election, 2007: Choi Wan South
Party	Candidate	Votes	%	±%
Democratic	Chan Lee-shing	1,448	50.5	
Independent	Chan Kwok-bun	1,420	49.5	
Majority		28	1.0	N/A
Democratic hold		Swing		

Wong Tai Sin District Council Election, 2003: Choi Wan South
Party	Candidate	Votes	%	±%
Democratic	Chan Lee-shing	Uncontested		
Majority				
Democratic hold		Swing		

=== 1990s ===
Wong Tai Sin District Council Election, 1999: Choi Wan South
Party	Candidate	Votes	%	±%
Democratic	Chan Lee-shing	Uncontested	(new)	(new)
Majority				
