= Lee On (constituency) =

Hong Kong constituency

- 利安
- Elected constituency for the Sha Tin District Council
- Boundary of Lee On in Sha Tin District
- District: Sha Tin
- Legislative Council constituency: New Territories South East
- Population: 16,415 (2019)
- Electorate: 11,006 (2019)

Current constituency
- Created: 1999
- Number of members: One
- Member: Chris Mak Yun-pui (Independent)

Lee On
- Traditional Chinese: 利安
Transcriptions
Yue: Cantonese
- Yale Romanization: Leih ōn
- Jyutping: Lei6 on1

Lee On is one of the 41 constituencies of the Sha Tin District Council. The seat elects one member of the council every four years. The constituency has an estimated population of 16,415.

== Councillors represented ==
Election	Member	Party
1999	Tsoi Ah-chung	Civil Force
200?	Tsoi Ah-chung	Independent
2011	Chris Mak Yun-pui	Democratic
2015	Chris Mak Yun-pui	Independent democrat

== Election results ==
=== 2010s ===
Sha Tin District Council Election, 2019: Lee On
Party	Candidate	Votes	%	±%
Ind. democrat	Chris Mak Yun-pui	5,343	65.61	
Independent	Li Lam-cheong	2,722	33.43	
Nonpartisan	Kwan Yu-fung	78	0.96	
Majority		2,621	32.18	
Turnout		8,162	74.18	
Ind. democrat hold		Swing		
