= Chung On (constituency) =

Constituency in Sha Tin District, Hong Kong

- Elected constituency for the Sha Tin District Council
- Boundary of Chung On in Sha Tin District
- District: Sha Tin
- Legislative Council constituency: New Territories South East
- Population: 15,840 (2019)
- Electorate: 10,487 (2019)

Current constituency
- Created: 1994 (first time); 2003 (second time)
- Number of members: One
- Member: Vacant
- Created from: Heng To, Kam Fung

Chung On is one of the 38 constituencies in the Sha Tin District in Hong Kong.

The constituency returns one district councillor to the Sha Tin District Council, with an election every four years. The seat has been currently held by Labour Party's Yip Wing. His term will start from 1 January 2016.

Chung on constituency is loosely based on the Chung on Estate, Vista Paradiso, Oceanaire and Baycrest in Ma On Shan with estimated population of 15,840.

== Councillors represented ==
Election	Member	Party
1994	Francis Chau Yin-ming	Independent
1999	Constituency abolished	
2003	Stephen Fong Chun-bong	Democratic
2006	Stephen Fong Chun-bong	Liberal
2007	Elizabeth Quat	DAB
2015	Yip Wing→Vacant	Labour

== Election results ==
=== 2010s ===
Sha Tin District Council Election, 2019: Chung On
Party	Candidate	Votes	%	±%
Labour	Yip Wing	4,665	60.92	+9.62
DAB	Maisy Kung Mei-chi	2,993	38.08	−9.62
Majority		1,672	22.84	
Turnout		7,706	73.50	
Labour hold		Swing		

Sha Tin District Council Election, 2015: Chung On
Party	Candidate	Votes	%	±%
Labour	Yip Wing	2,506	51.3	
DAB	Elizabeth Quat	2,376	48.7	–10.1
Majority		130	2.6	
Turnout		4,976	45.8	
Labour gain from DAB		Swing		

Sha Tin District Council Election, 2011: Chung On
Party	Candidate	Votes	%	±%
DAB	Elizabeth Quat	2,455	58.8	+3.1
PfD	Lau Ka-yee	1,721	41.2	
DAB hold		Swing		

=== 2000s ===
Sha Tin District Council Election, 2007: Chung On
Party	Candidate	Votes	%	±%
DAB	Elizabeth Quat	2,379	55.7	+6.5
Democratic	Lo Yun-ming	1,889	44.3	−6.5
DAB gain from Liberal		Swing		

Sha Tin District Council Election, 2003: Chung On
Party	Candidate	Votes	%	±%
Democratic	Stephen Fong Chun-bong	1,946	50.8	
DAB	Chan Hak-kan	1,887	49.2	
Democratic win (new seat)				

=== 1990s ===
Sha Tin District Council Election, 1994: Chung On
Party	Candidate	Votes	%	±%
Independent	Francis Chau Yin-ming	3,143	66.9	
Independent	Wong Ming	1,171	24.9	
HKPA	Liu Kwok-fai	373	7.9	
Independent win (new seat)				
