= Jordan South (constituency) =

- Elected constituency for the Yau Tsim Mong District Council
- Boundary of Jordan South in Yau Tsim Mong District
- District: Yau Tsim (1985–1994); Yau Tsim Mong (1994–present)
- Legislative Council constituency: Kowloon West
- Population: 12,742 (2019)
- Electorate: 4,649 (2019)

Current constituency
- Created: 1985
- Number of members: One
- Member: vacant

Jordan South (Chinese: 佐敦南), previously called Jordan and Jordan East, is one of the 19 constituencies in the Yau Tsim Mong District. The constituency returns one district councillor to the Yau Tsim Mong District Council, with an election every four years.

== Councillors represented ==
=== 1985–94 ===
Election	First Member	First Party	Second Member	Second Party
1985	Ng Kin-sun	Independent	Wai Kin-pong	Reform Club
1988	Ng Kin-sun	Independent	Lee King-wah	Reform Club
199?	Ng Kin-sun	LDF	Lee King-wah	Independent

=== 1994 to present ===
Election	Member	Party
1994	Ng Kin-sun	LDF
1999	Lau Chi-wing	DAB
2011	Chris Ip Ngo-tung	DAB
2019	Chan Tsz-wai→vacant	Independent democrat

== Election results ==
=== 2010s ===
Yau Tsim Mong District Council Election, 2019: Jordan North
Party	Candidate	Votes	%	±%
PfD	Chan Tsz-wai	1,516	51.10	
DAB	Chris Ip Ngo-tung	1,451	48.90	
Majority		65	2.20	
Turnout		2,993	64.38	
PfD gain from DAB		Swing		
