= Professional Power =

Professional Power 專業動力
- Abbreviation: PP
- Chairperson: Christine Fong
- Founded: 2010
- Headquarters: Shop 2, Ground Floor, Shin Chi House, Shin Ming Estate, Tiu Keng Leng, Tseung Kwan O
- Ideology: Moderate conservatism
- Regional affiliation: Pro-Beijing camp
- Colours: Blue
- Slogan: Professionalism for Hong Kong, Driving Prosperity
- Legislative Council: 1 / 90
- District Councils: 1 / 470

Website
- www.facebook.com/hkpp.page

Professional Power (Chinese: 專業動力) is a political group based in Sai Kung District, Hong Kong. The group is formed and led by Christine Fong, a former member of the Liberal Party. The group markets itself as nonpartisan and currently has a single member in the Sai Kung District Council and Legislative Council, being Chairperson Christine Fong.

== History ==
On 9 December 2010, Liberal Party member Christine Fong left the party over concerns of the Liberal Party prioritizing larger companies over smaller businesses and issues on standard working hours, causing her to found Professional Power.

In the 2015 District Council elections, Professional Power fielded nine candidates, with four getting elected. The group fielded seven candidates in the 2019 election, with three elected however 2 later left the party in 2022.

== Political stance ==
Alternative logo for Professional Power

Professional Power does not belong to the centrist camp in a narrow sense, but it has been considered the most moderate conservative political group within the pro-Beijing camp.

And yet, in 2016 Hong Kong legislative election, it was reported that the Hong Kong Liaison Office has been trying to "allocate" the votes to Fong.

In 2019 Hong Kong local elections, many candidates of the Professional Power were not challenged by any parties or independent politicians from the pro-Beijing camp. Prior to the polling day, there was a list widely circulated in LIHKG and Factcheck.io. The list claimed itself as a list of candidates endorsed by Hong Kong Federation of Trade Unions. The list has included six candidates from the Professional Power.

In the 2021 Legislative Council election, Connie Lam So-wai ran in the New Territories South East, receiving nominations from a member of Chinese People's Political Consultative Conference (CPPCC) Paul Kwong and other pro-Beijing stance. Christine Fong was also rumoured to have been "blessed" and approved by Chinese Government to run in the election. The group later was branded as part of pro-Beijing camp, despite Lam rejected the labeling and insisted the group as "pro-livelihood camp" (Chinese: 民生派).

== Performance in elections ==
=== Legislative Council elections ===
Election	Number of popular votes	% of popular votes	GC seats	FC seats	EC seats	Total seats	+/−	Position
2012	24,594▲	1.35▲	0	0		0 / 70	0	Steady
2016	34,544▲	1.59▲	0	0		0 / 70	0	Steady
2018 (By-election)	64,905▲	15.74▲	0	0		0 / 1	0	Steady
2021	38,214▼	2.89▼	1	0	0	1 / 90	1▲	9th
2025	58,828▲	4.61▲	1	0	0	1 / 90	1	8th▲

=== District Council elections ===
Election	Number of popular votes	% of popular votes	Total elected seats	+/−
2015	13,865	1.07	4 / 458	2▲
2019	16,619▲	1.93▲	3 / 452	1▼
2023	23,557▲	2.01▲	1 / 470	2▼

== See also ==
- Path of Democracy
- Third Side
- Hope for Hong Kong
