= On Tai (constituency) =

Hong Kong constituency

- Elected constituency for the Sha Tin District Council
- Boundary of On Tai in Sha Tin District
- District: Sha Tin
- Legislative Council constituency: New Territories South East
- Population: 14,323 (2019)
- Electorate: 9,770 (2019)

Current constituency
- Created: 2003
- Number of members: One
- Member: Cheng Chung-hang (Independent)
- Created from: Heng To

On Tai is one of the 36 constituencies of the Sha Tin District Council. The seat elects one member of the council every four years. It was first created in 2003. The current boundary is loosely based on the areas of Kam Tai Court, Mountain Shore.

== Councillors represented ==
Election	Member	Party
2003	Lee Lap-hong	Democratic
2005	Lee Lap-hong	Independent
2007	Yeung Cheung-li	DAB
2012 by-election	Alvin Chiu Man-leong	DAB
2019	Osman Cheng Chung-hang	Independent democrat

== Election results ==
Sha Tin District Council Election, 2019: On Tai
Party	Candidate	Votes	%	±%
Ind. democrat	Osman Cheng Chung-hang	4,419	57.88	
DAB	Alvin Chiu Man-leong	3,163	41.43	−16.57
Ind. democrat	Tong Chi-pui	53	0.69	
Majority		1,256	16.45	
Turnout		7,654	78.37	
Ind. democrat hold		Swing		

Sha Tin District Council Election, 2015: On Tai
Party	Candidate	Votes	%	±%
DAB	Alvin Chiu Man-leong	3,657	58.0	+24.2
Democratic	Donna Yau Yuet-wah	2,647	42.0	+9.2
Majority		1,010	16.0	+15.0
Turnout		6,304	53.7	
DAB hold		Swing		

On Tai by-election 2012
Party	Candidate	Votes	%	±%
DAB	Alvin Chiu Man-leong	1,488	33.85	−21.42
Democratic	Donna Yau Yuet-wah	1,443	32.83	+1.45
Neo Democrats	Chan Pui-ming	1,329	30.23	
Independent	Chan Kwok-keung	83	1.89	
Independent	So Tat-leung	53	1.21	
Majority		45	1.02	−19.97
DAB hold		Swing		

Sha Tin District Council Election, 2011: On Tai
Party	Candidate	Votes	%	±%
DAB	Yeung-Cheung-li	2,417	55.27	−2.49
Democratic	Chow Wai-tung	1,499	34.28	
People Power (The Frontier (2010-))	So Tat-leung	457	10.45	
Majority		918	20.99	+5.47
DAB hold		Swing		

Sha Tin District Council Election, 2007: On Tai
Party	Candidate	Votes	%	±%
DAB	Yeung-Cheung-li	2,508	57.76	+10.49
Independent (Democratic Coalition)	Lee Lap-hong	1,834	42.34	−10.49
Majority		674	15.52	−10.07
DAB gain from Independent		Swing		

Sha Tin District Council Election, 2003: On Tai
Party	Candidate	Votes	%	±%
Democratic	Lee Lap-hong	2,108	52.73	
DAB	Yeung Cheung-li	1,890	47.27	
Majority		218	5.45	(new)
Democratic win (new seat)				
