= New Territories South East (2021 constituency) =

Geographical constituency in Hong Kong

- Geographical constituency for the Legislative Council of Hong Kong
- Boundary of New Territories South East in Hong Kong
- District: Sai Kung District; Eastern part of Sha Tin District
- Region: New Territories
- Population: 746,400
- Electorate: 472,751

Current constituency
- Created: 2021
- Number of members: Two
- Members: Chris Ip Ngo-tung (DAB); Christine Fong (PP)
- Created from: New Territories East (1998)

The New Territories South East geographical constituency is one of the ten geographical constituencies in the elections for the Legislative Council of Hong Kong which elects two members of the Legislative Council using the single non-transferable vote (SNTV) system. The constituency covers Sai Kung District and Eastern part of Sha Tin District in New Territories.

== History ==
The constituency was created under the overhaul of the electoral system imposed by the Beijing government in 2021, replacing the Sai Kung District and eastern part of Sha Tin District (Hoi Nam, Chung On, Kam To, Ma On Shan Town Centre, Wu Kai Sha, Lee On, Fu Lung, Kam Ying, Yiu On, Heng On, Tai Shui Hang, On Tai, Yu Yan, Kwong Hong, Kwong Yuen) of the New Territories East constituency used from 1998 to 2021. A constituency with the same name was also created for the 1995 Legislative Council election in the late colonial period which elected one seat with a similar boundary.

== Returning members ==
Election	Member	Party	Member	Party
2021	Li Sai-wing	DAB/NTAS	Lam So-wai	PP
2025	Chris Ip	DAB/NTAS	Christine Fong	PP

== Election results ==
=== 2020s ===
2025 Legislative Council election: New Territories South East
Party	Candidate	Votes	%	±%
PP	Christine Fong Kwok-shan	58,828	42.18	
DAB	Chris Ip Ngo-tung	26,520	19.02	
NPP	Chan Chi-ho	18,797	13.40	
Nonpartisan	Chris Cheung Mei-hung	18,681	13.40	
FTU	Janet Lee Ching-yee	16,636	11.93	
Total valid votes		139,462	31.73	
Rejected ballots		4,014	0.91	
Turnout		143,476	32.64	
Registered electors		440,190		
PP hold		Swing		
DAB hold		Swing		

Vote share
1. DAB (64.8%)
2. Professional Power (30.0%)
3. Nonpartisan (5.27%)

2021 Legislative Council election: New Territories South East
Party	Candidate	Votes	%	±%
DAB (NTAS)	Li Sai-wing	82,595	64.77	
PP	Lam So-wai	38,214	29.97	
Nonpartisan	Daryl Choi Ming-hei	6,718	5.27	
Total valid votes		127,527	100.00	
Rejected ballots		2,881		
Turnout		130,408	27.58	
Registered electors		472,751		
DAB win (new seat)				
PP win (new seat)				
