= Choi Hung (constituency) =

Constituency in Wong Tai Sin District, Hong Kong

- Elected constituency for the Wong Tai Sin District Council
- Boundary of Choi Hung in Wong Tai Sin District
- District: Wong Tai Sin
- Legislative Council constituency: Kowloon East
- Population: 14,841 (2019)
- Electorate: 9,993 (2019)

Current constituency
- Created: 1982
- Number of members: One
- Member(s): Sean Mock Ho-chit (CHESSA)

Choi Hung
- Traditional Chinese: 彩虹
Transcriptions
Yue: Cantonese
- Yale Romanization: Chói hùhng
- Jyutping: Coi2 hung4

Choi Hung is one of the 25 constituencies in the Wong Tai Sin District in Hong Kong. The constituency returns one district councillor to the Wong Tai Sin District Council, with an election every four years.

The constituency has an estimated population of 14,841.

== Councillors represented ==
| Election | Member | Party |
|---|---|---|
| 1982 | Yuen Chau | Independent |
| 1990 | Yuen Chau | LDF |
| 199? | Yuen Chau | EKDRC |
| 1999 | Lau Ka-wah | Independent |
| 2007 | Mok Kin-wing | FTU/DAB |
| 2019 | Sean Mock Ho-chit→vacant | CHESSA |

== Election results ==
=== 2010s ===
Wong Tai Sin District Council Election, 2019: Choi Hung
| Party | Candidate | Votes | % | ±% |
|---|---|---|---|---|
| CHESSA | Sean Mock Ho-chit | 3,523 | 50.60 | |
| FTU | Mok Kin-wing | 3,439 | 49.40 | |
| Majority | | 84 | 1.20 | |
| Turnout | | 6,995 | 70.06 | |
| CHESSA gain from FTU | | Swing | | |
