= Lam So-wai =

Hong Kong politician (born 1987)

The Honourable Lam So-wai
- 林素蔚
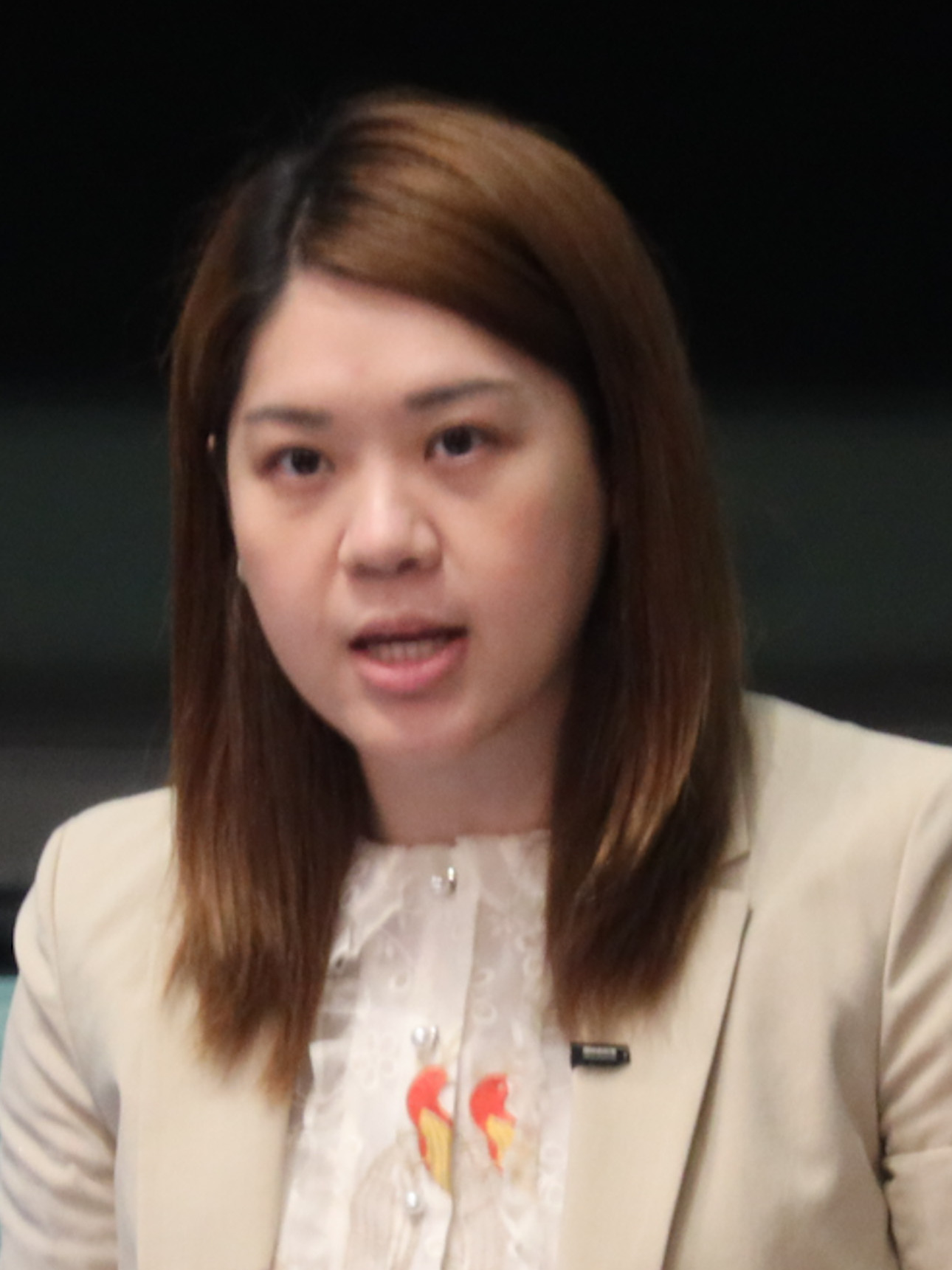
- Lam in 2023

Member of the Legislative Council
- In office 1 January 2022 – 31 December 2025
- Preceded by: Constituency created
- Succeeded by: Christine Fong
- Constituency: New Territories South East

Personal details
- Born: 31 December 1987 (age 38) Shenzhen, China
- Party: Professional Power (2019-2025); New People's Party (2025-present)
- Education: Pooi To Middle School; QualiEd College; The Hong Kong Polytechnic University

Connie Lam So-wai (Chinese: 林素蔚; born 31 December 1987) is a Hong Kong politician who a former Legislative Council member for New Territories South East.

Lam was formerly a member of Professional Power but joined the New People's Party (NPP) in 2025 after announcing she would not run for re-election and said that she would support New People's Party candidate Victor Chan Chi-ho in her New Territories South East constituency in the upcoming legislative election.

== Biography ==
Lam attended Pooi To Middle School in Hong Kong for Forms 1 through 5 before transferring to QualiEd College to complete her Form 7 preparatory course. She later obtained a Bachelor of Arts (Honours) and a Master of Arts in Social Work degree from the Hong Kong Polytechnic University.

On 12 October 2025, Lam announced that she would not seek re-election to the Legislative Council in order to focus on pursuing her doctoral degree.

== Personal life ==
In September 2022, Lam tested positive for COVID-19.

== Electoral history ==
2021 legislative election: New Territories South East
Party	Candidate	Votes	%	±%
DAB	Li Sai-wing	82,595	64.77	N/A
PP	Lam So-wai	38,214	29.97	N/A
Independent	Daryl Choi Ming-hei	6,718	5.27	N/A
Majority				
Total valid votes		127,527		
Turnout				
DAB win (new seat)				
PP win (new seat)				

2019 local elections at the Sai Kung District Council: O Tong
Party	Candidate	Votes	%	±%
Neo Democrats	Lui Man-kwong	4,722	63.09	+19.03
Independent	Lam So-wai	2,762	36.91	N/A
Majority		1,960	26.18	
Turnout		7,515	74.67	+28.1
Neo Democrats hold		Swing		

== Footnote ==
Legislative Council of Hong Kong
New constituency	Member of Legislative Council; Representative for New Territories South East; 2022–present	Incumbent
