= Kowloon East (2021 constituency) =

Geographical constituency in Hong Kong

- Geographical constituency for the Legislative Council of Hong Kong
- Boundary of Kowloon East in Hong Kong
- District: Kwun Tong District; South-eastern part of Wong Tai Sin District
- Region: Kowloon
- Population: 771,800
- Electorate: 475,223

Current constituency
- Created: 2021
- Number of members: Two
- Members: Tang Ka-piu (FTU); Ngan Man-yu (DAB)
- Created from: Kowloon East (1998)

The Kowloon East geographical constituency is one of the ten geographical constituencies in the elections for the Legislative Council of Hong Kong which elects two members of the Legislative Council using the single non-transferable vote (SNTV) system. The constituency covers Kwun Tong District and south-eastern part of Wong Tai Sin District in Kowloon.

== History ==
The constituency was created under the overhaul of the electoral system imposed by the Beijing government in 2021, replacing the Kwun Tong District and south-eastern part of Wong Tai Sin District (Choi Wan East, Choi Wan South, Choi Wan West, Chi Choi, Choi Hung) of the Kowloon East constituency used from 1998 to 2021. Constituencies with the same name were also created for the 1991 and 1995 elections in the late colonial period, while the 1991 constituency also elected two seats with each voter having two votes.

== Returning members ==
Election	Member	Party	Member	Party
2021	Tang Ka-piu	FTU	Ngan Man-yu	DAB
2025	Tang Ka-piu	FTU	Cheung Pui-kong	DAB

== Election results ==
=== 2020s ===
2025 Legislative Council election: Kowloon East
Party	Candidate	Votes	%	±%
FTU	Tang Ka-piu	53,675	38.41	−5.7
DAB	Cheung Pui-kong	29,116	20.84	
Nonpartisan	Leung Sze-wan	28,834	20.64	
DAB	Ngan Man-yu	24,250	17.35	−26.24
Nonpartisan (PoD)	Chan Chun-hung	3,855	2.76	+0.73
Total valid votes		139,730		
Rejected ballots		4,008		
Turnout		143,738	32.54	
Registered electors		442,692		
FTU hold		Swing		
DAB gain from DAB		Swing		

Vote share
1. FTU (44.1%)
2. DAB (43.6%)
3. Path of Democracy (2.03%)
4. Nonpartisan (10.3%)

2021 Legislative Council election: Kowloon East
Party	Candidate	Votes	%	±%
FTU	Tang Ka-piu	65,036	44.11	
DAB	Ngan Man-yu	64,275	43.59	
Nonpartisan	Li Ka-yan	12,049	8.17	
Nonpartisan	Wu Kin-wa	3,090	2.10	
PoD	Chan Chun-hung	2,999	2.03	
Total valid votes		147,449	100.00	
Rejected ballots		2,802		
Turnout		150,251	31.62	
Registered electors		475,223		
FTU win (new seat)				
DAB win (new seat)				
