= Peter Lau =

- 劉家強
- Born: 1955 or 1956 (age 70–71)
- Education: St. Joseph's College

Peter Lau Ka-keung (Chinese: 劉家強, born 1955 or 1956) is a senior civil servant in Hong Kong who served as the Director of Drainage Services Department and the Director of Highways Department.

== Resume ==
Lau joined the British Hong Kong Government as an assistant engineer in August 1980, was promoted to chief engineer in July 1996. After the handover of Hong Kong, he was promoted to government engineer in January 2001, and to chief government engineer in September 2004.

In July 2010, during a black rainstorm warning, a flash flood struck Sha Po Tsai Village in Tai Po, resulting in the complete destruction of the village and one death. The incident was suspected to be related to the Drainage Services Department's river works, but Lau immediately asserted that it was unrelated, sparking public outrage. Public pressure prompted the Development Bureau to order the Drainage Services Department to investigate the cause of the flooding, and Lau was required to issue a public apology.

In September 2010, shortly after the Sha Po Tsai Village incident, Lau, who had only been in charge of the Drainage Services Department for a year and a half, was promoted to Director of the Highways Department, a sixth-level position. His original post was taken over by Chan Chi-chiu, Director of the New Territories West and North Development Office of the Civil Engineering and Development Department.

During Lau's tenure at the Highways Department, projects he oversaw, including the Hong Kong-Zhuhai-Macau Bridge and the Hong Kong Express Rail Link, experienced delays. The former was plagued by several fatal industrial accidents, resulting in the deaths of seven workers. The latter was investigated by a Legislative Council Select Committee, where the pro-democracy camp criticized Lau in a minority report for professional misjudgment, which they claimed prevented the department from effectively fulfilling its oversight duties, and for his "professional arrogance".

Lau began his pre-retirement leave on July 30, 2016, and his position was taken over by Daniel Chung Kam-wah (鍾錦華), the former Director of the Civil Engineering and Development Department.
