= 2019 Southern District Council election =

Hong Kong local election

- 24 November 2019

All 17 seats to Southern District Council 9 seats needed for a majority
- Turnout: 71.0% ▲20.5%
	First party	Second party	Third party
Party	Democratic	Civic	Liberal
Last election	4 seats, 26.4%	0 seat, 6.1%	1 seat, 4.4%
Seats before	3	0	1
Seats won	7	1	1
Seat change	▲4	▲1	Steady
Popular vote	30,187	3,750	1,882
Percentage	28.1%	3.5%	1.8%
Swing	▲1.7%	▼2.6%	▼2.6%
	Fourth party	Fifth party
Party	DAB	NPP
Last election	2 seats, 14.9%	1 seat, 5.2%
Seats before	2	1
Seats won	0	0
Seat change	▼2	▼1
Popular vote	21,068	3,206
Percentage	19.6%	3.0%
Swing	▲4.7%	▼2.2%
- Colours on map indicate winning party for each constituency.

The 2019 Southern District Council election was held in Hong Kong on 24 November 2019 to elect all 17 members to the Southern District Council.

The pro-democrats achieved the majority in the council in a historic landslide victory brought by the pro-democracy protests. Kelvin Lam Ho-por, a substitute for Joshua Wong who was disqualified from running, defeated Judy Chan Ka-pui of the New People's Party in South Horizons West.

== Overall election results ==
Before election:

↓
5	12
Pro-democracy	Pro-Beijing

Change in composition:

↓
15	2
Pro-democracy	PB

Southern District Council election result 2019
Party	Seats	Gains	Losses	Net gain/loss	Seats %	Votes %	Votes	+/−
Independent	9	5	7	−2	52.9	44.1	47,367	
Democratic	7	4	0	+4	41.2	28.1	30,187	+1.7
DAB	0	0	2	−2	0.0	19.6	21,068	−2.9
Civic	1	1	0	+1	5.9	3.5	3,750	–2.6
NPP	0	0	1	−1	0.0	3.0	3,236	−2.2
Liberal	1	0	0	0	5.9	1.8	1,882	−2.6
