= Urban Renewal Authority =

Statutory body in Hong Kong

- 市區重建局

Agency overview
- Formed: 2001
- Preceding agency: Land Development Corporation (土地發展公司)
- Jurisdiction: Hong Kong
- Headquarters: COSCO Tower, Sheung Wan
- Agency executives: Chow Chung-kong, Chairman; Wai Chi-sing, Managing Director
- Website: www.ura.org.hk

Urban Renewal Authority
- Traditional Chinese: 市區重建局
- Simplified Chinese: 市区重建局
Transcriptions
Standard Mandarin
- Hanyu Pinyin: Shìqū chóngjiànjú
Yue: Cantonese
- Yale Romanization: Si^{5} keui^{1} chung^{4} gin^{3} guk^{6}
- Jyutping: Síh kēui chùhng gin guhk

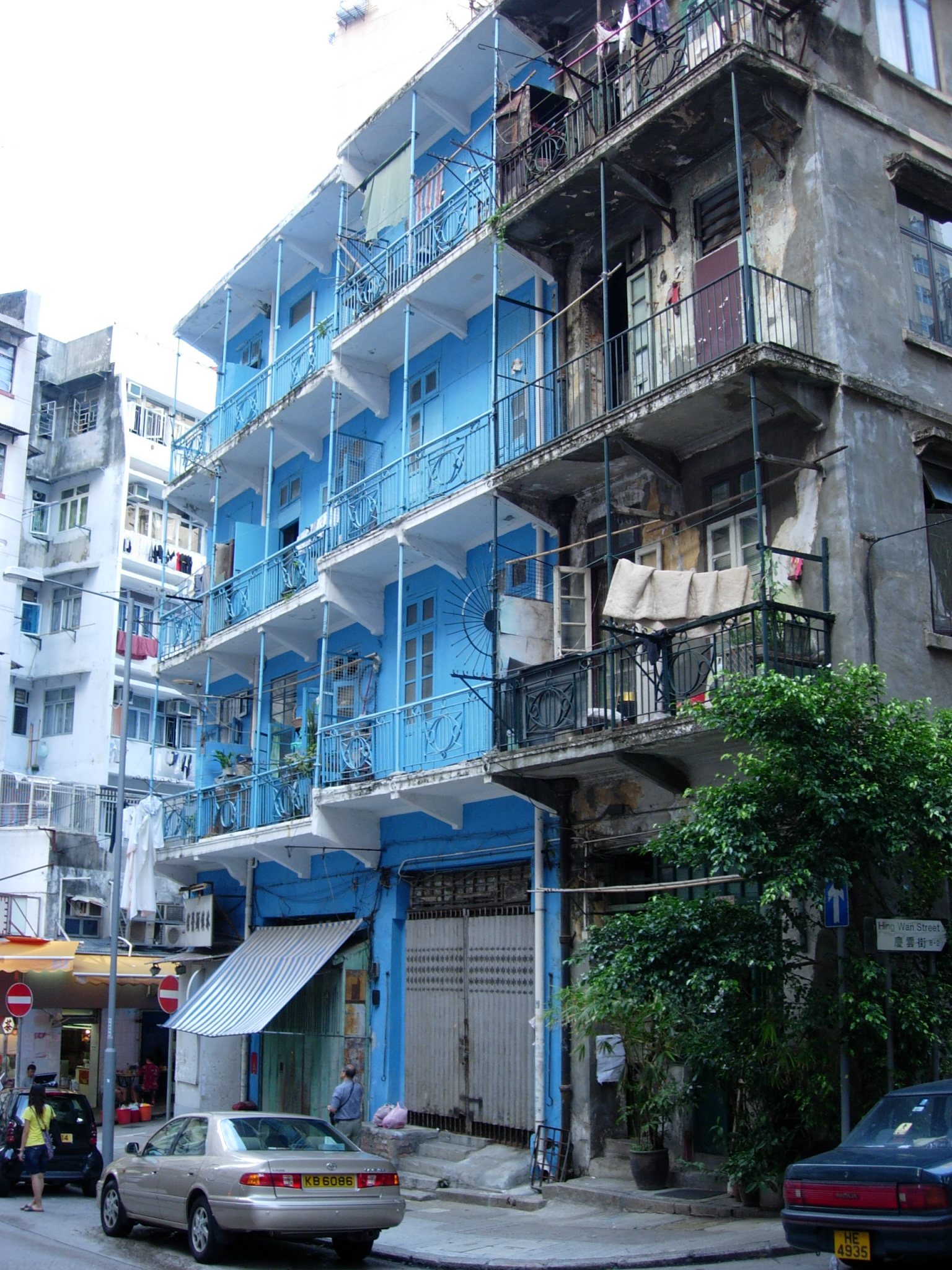
The "Blue House" in Stone Nullah Lane.

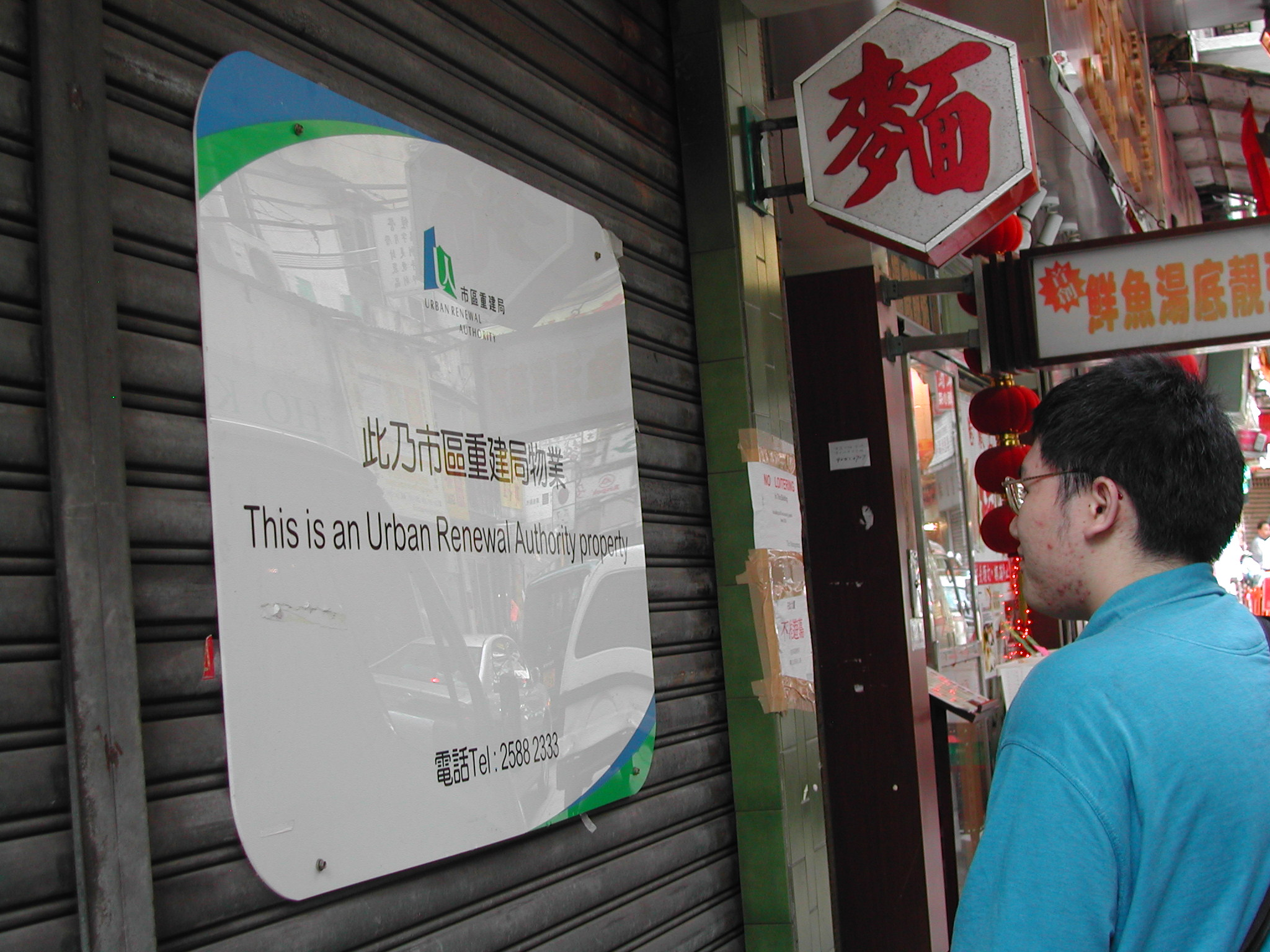
A printing shop with an Urban Renewal Authority closure notice.

The Urban Renewal Authority (URA) is a quasi-governmental, profit-making statutory body in Hong Kong responsible for accelerating urban redevelopment.

== History ==
The authority's predecessor, the Land Development Corporation (土地發展公司, or 土發 for short), was founded in 1988. The new Urban Renewal Authority was founded in 1999 with the aim of speeding up urban renewal. Difficulties reaching agreement on compensation packages for people affected by planned redevelopments delayed the actual commencement of the URA. The agency was finally established on 1 May 2001 and the LDC was dissolved the same day.

A main difference between the former LDC and the URA is the URA's ability to directly resume land (akin to expropriation in other countries). The LDC was required to undertake lengthy negotiations with owners in order to acquire land, and had to demonstrate that it had taken all steps to acquire land on a fair and reasonable basis before it could apply to the Secretary for Planning, Environment and Lands for compulsory land resumption. The difficulty in overriding dissenting property owners was the main reason the LDC was slow to undertake urban renewal.

Unlike the LDC, the URA is also tax-exempt.

== Approach ==
At present, there are about 16,000 private buildings that are 30 or more years old within the metro area of Hong Kong Island, Kowloon, Tsuen Wan District and Kwai Tsing District. By 2030, the number of buildings over 30 years old will increase fourfold, and more than 14,000 will be over 50 years old.

Urban renewal in Hong Kong typically involves relatively large-scale redevelopment of urban areas, rather than piecemeal rebuilding of individual buildings or the provision of specific facilities. Streets are often closed, combining smaller urban blocks into larger superblocks. When urban renewal is announced for a specific area, a "freezing survey" is undertaken to identify the current inhabitants, with an aim to preventing opportunists from moving into urban renewal sites in order to receive compensation. The URA then compensates owners and demolishes the district. URA redevelopments generally comprise luxury shopping centres and luxury residential developments.

With the stated aim to address the problem of urban decay and improve the living conditions of residents in dilapidated areas, the Urban Renewal Authority Ordinance (Chapter 563) was enacted in July 2000. The Ordinance provides a new institutional framework for carrying out urban renewal in locations that the private market finds unprofitable. The Hong Kong Government conducted a comprehensive review of "Urban Renewal Strategy" in 2008. After two years' 'community engagement', the new strategy was promulgated on 24 Feb 2011.

Following this review, the stated strategy of the URA is that Hong Kong's urban renewal should follow three major principles: "Putting People first"; "District-Based"; and "Community Participation". Their adherence to these tenets has been questioned by some, including legislator Kenneth Chan, who stated that "the URA always puts its interests first" in reference to the controversy surrounding the Graham Street market eviction, and in reference to the "undemocratic" approach undertaken by the URA in demolishing Lee Tung Street.

== Criticism ==
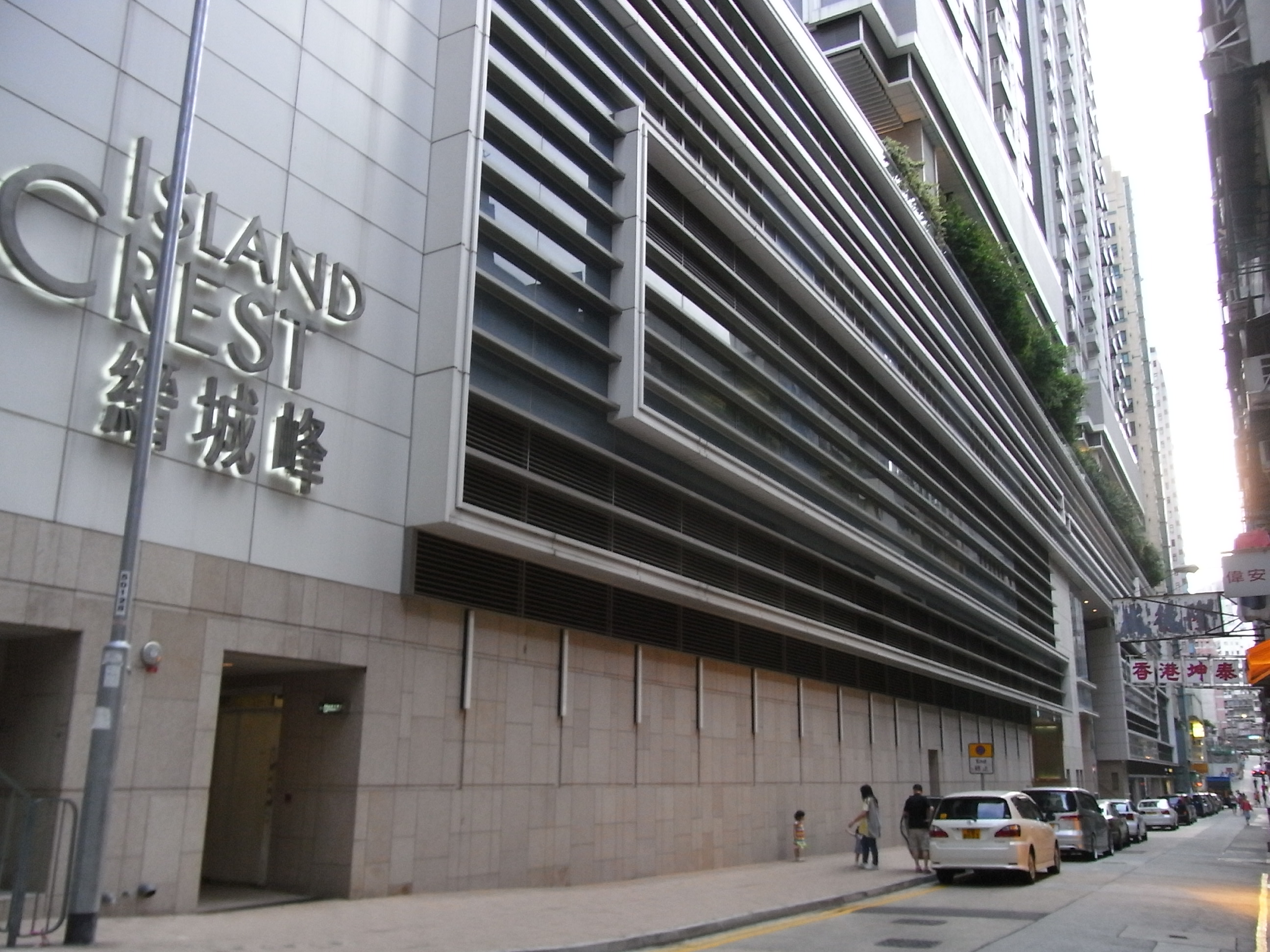
URA projects have been criticised for lacking human scale. The Island Crest development replaced a block of shophouses.

Redevelopment projects by the Urban Renewal Authority typically involve the wholesale demolition of urban districts and the consolidation of numerous city blocks to accommodate large-scale commercial development. This approach is frequently criticised for destroying cultural heritage, unique local character, and touchstones of collective memory. Community and economic networks are also dismantled as the compensation the URA offers to displaced residents and merchants is rarely sufficient to permit them to return to the affected district. Such grievances are leveled against most URA redevelopment projects, and have escalated to community uprising and hunger strikes by those unwilling to be evicted. The authority has been said to view all older, low-rise districts as merely "vacant airspace with great development potential" rather than functioning communities, thus putting vast older areas of the city under threat of destruction.

In addition to economic exclusivity and disregard for existing local communities, URA redevelopments have also been criticised for poor urban design, such as long stretches of blank wall at ground level which effectively kills the vibrant street life for which older districts are known.

=== Demolition of Lee Tung Street ===
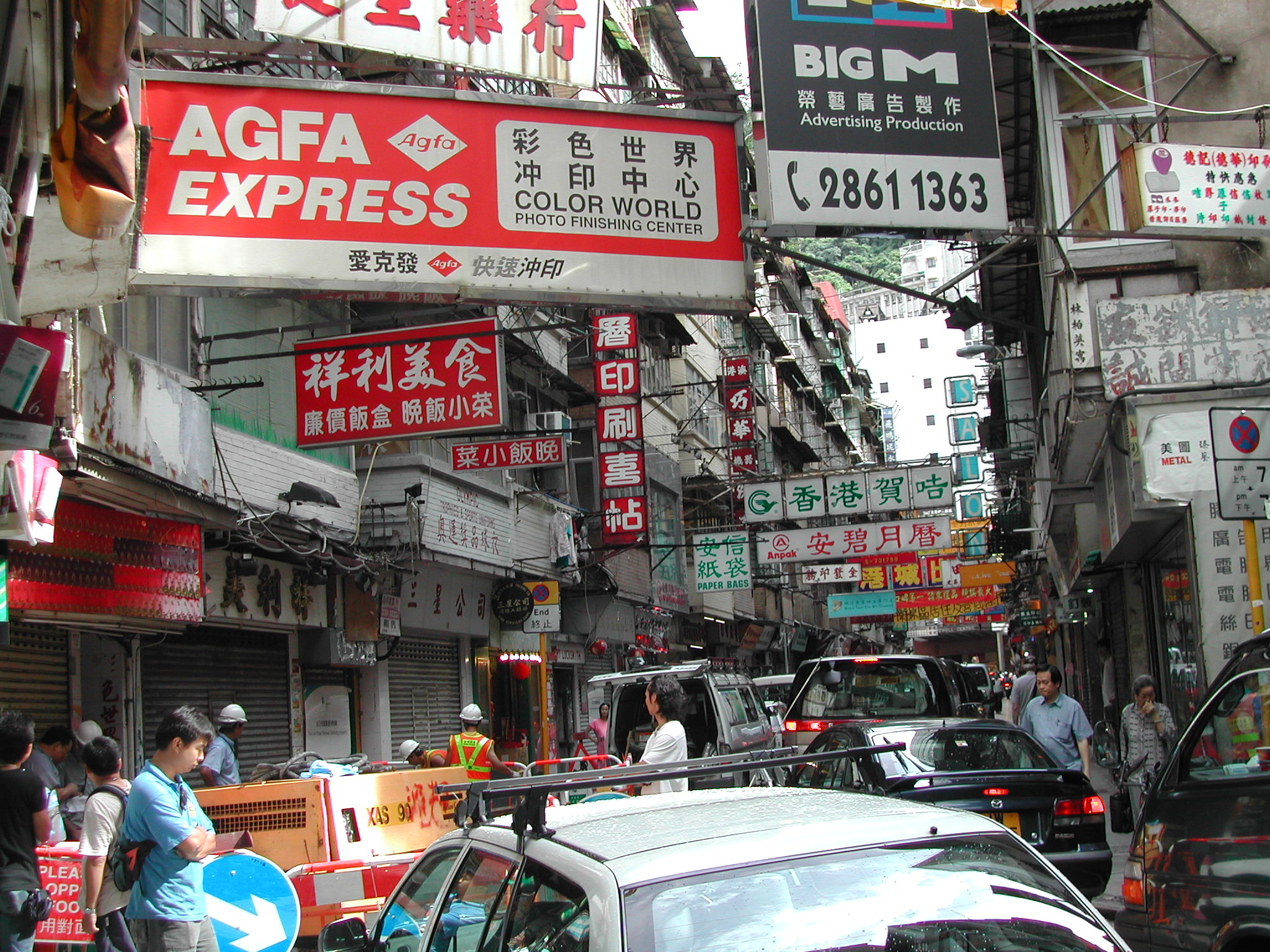
Lee Tung Street prior to demolition.

Lee Tung Street (Chinese: 利東街), better known by its local nickname "Wedding Card Street" (Chinese: 喜帖街), was famous for its printing shops that sell custom-made wedding cards, coloured bright red for good luck. Tens of thousands purchased their wedding cards in the area in the preceding decades, and the district was also the birthplace of the publishing business in Hong Kong. The URA announced in 2003 its intention to redevelop an area of 8,900 square metres centred on Lee Tung and McGregor streets. Fifty-four buildings housing 930 households were planned to be torn down to accommodate four residential towers and four shopping malls.

The redevelopment was subject to a heavy backlash in the community. The decision to demolish was called "undemocratic" and contrary to the stated "people-centred" mandate of the URA. The wedding card printers and publishers were concerned about the loss of invaluable economic and social networks, having to leave the district due to high real estate prices, and the loss of accessibility to suppliers and customers alike. Even though the redevelopment includes a "Wedding City"-themed shopping mall, merchants complained they could not return to the area because most could not afford the increased rents. Under the Land Resumption Ordinance, the URA was able to expropriate tenants and landowners regardless of their will, leading to accusations that URA activities run contrary to public interest and represent an infringement on property rights.

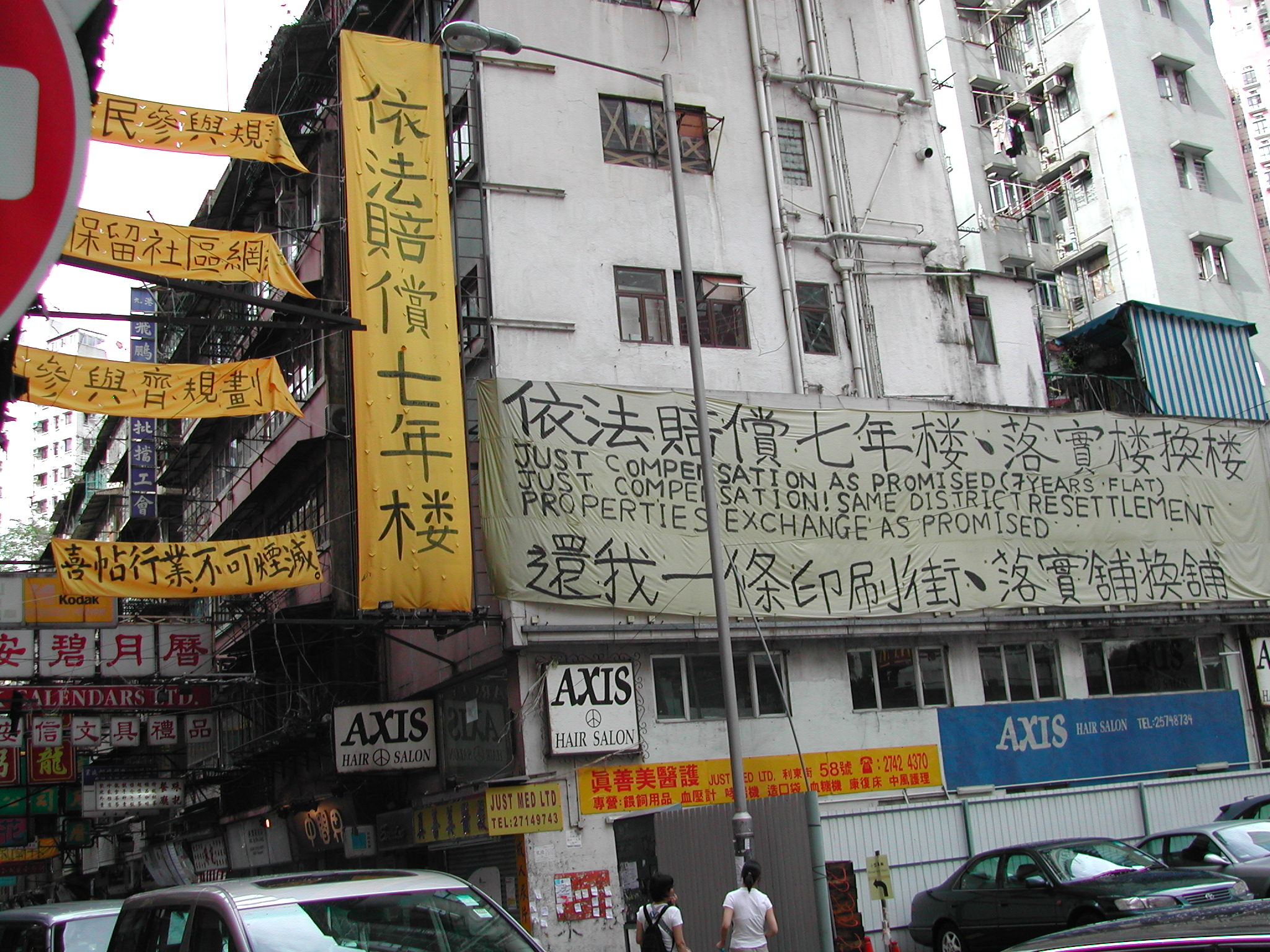
Banners posted all over Lee Tung Street protesting the demolition.

The H15 Concern Group (Chinese: H15關注組) was formed to save the wedding card shops and produced an alternative plan called the "dumbbell proposal" which retained the signature tong lau (Chinese walk-up buildings). This plan later received a Silver Award from the Institute of Planners. The URA faced criticism when demolition of the area began three weeks before the Town Planning Board was set to consider the concern group's alternative proposal, with URA chairman Barry Cheung Chun-yuen being driven out of the area by upset locals. One resident, a former shopowner, staged a hunger strike after the bulldozers moved in earlier than anticipated and was hospitalised after four days.

Development chief Carrie Lam defended the project, stating that the buildings of Lee Tung Street were "not worth keeping and had little historic value" and that "stopping the plan would jeopardise the city's future planning". The H15 Concern Group proposal to save the street was rejected by the Planning Department in January 2008 for failing to include a structural assessment, which the concern group said was outside their financial capability. The URA and the government went on to demolish the street as planned, and redevelopment is well underway.

=== Expropriation of commercial tenants ===
Commercial tenants sometimes have a different view towards urban renewal as low-cost premises are getting hard to find. Affordable commercial space is not always available in newly developed commercial buildings. Even owner-operators of commercial premises are unable to relocate in the same district because the compensation they get from the Urban Renewal Authority does not always match the purchase price of similar-sized properties in the same district. It was proposed, therefore, that options should be made available to owners or tenants so that they can choose between physical relocation by developers, cash compensation to allow them buy or rent elsewhere, or wind up their businesses altogether.

=== Suppression of internal dissent ===
At the end of April 2007, Alan Leong Kah-kit was dropped from the board of directors of the URA after two years of service. Leong said he was not angry or surprised, and expressed doubt on whether the authority works in the public interest: "The government expects those who are appointed to statutory bodies to shut up and not express any opposing view to the public [...] It doesn't really matter that I have not been reappointed to the authority. After all, if I really want to work for the people, then there is no point in staying there." Another Civic Party member and Legislative Councillor Tanya Chan was appointed to the URA board in his place.

On 30 March 2015, URA Managing Director Iris Tam Siu-ying suddenly resigned over what she called (in a letter to staff) "fundamental differences" with chairman Victor So Hing-woh over the body's philosophy and mission. Tam objected to So placing profit ahead of the agency's social mission. So, a former Link REIT chief executive, joined the URA in 2013. Tam, a two-time president of the Hong Kong Institute of Planners, had been with the URA since 2006, and served as managing director since 2013. As of 2015, she remained a member of the Hong Kong Housing Authority.

Tam had objected to various proposals by So, including to outsource URA's acquisition department, and for the organisation to partner with Richfield Realty, a commercial developer. The URA board unanimously asked Tam to stay, but she quit anyway, stating, "I find it totally unacceptable to position URA as a developer or a land assembly agent to supply land for developers." Daniel Lam Chun was appointed interim managing director following Tam's resignation, with Wai Chi-sing taking up the position on a permanent basis from 15 June 2016 for a term of three years.

The authority's managing director serves as both its administrative head and deputy chairman of its board.

=== Wikipedia editing ===
In 2012, the URA was criticised for editing Wikipedia pages about itself, its projects, and certain senior staff including former director Barry Cheung. The edits, on both the Chinese and English Wikipedias, suppressed information unfavourable to the URA and the government and referred to controversial URA projects in a positive light. The URA's director of corporate communications also authored a Wikipedia page about himself that was later deleted. Apple Daily compared the editing to Mainland China's 50 cent party internet commenters paid by the Chinese government to sway public opinion. The Hong Kong Wikimedia Chapter stressed that in order to maintain Wikipedia's neutrality, entities with a conflict of interest should avoid editing.

=== Graham and Peel Street demolitions ===
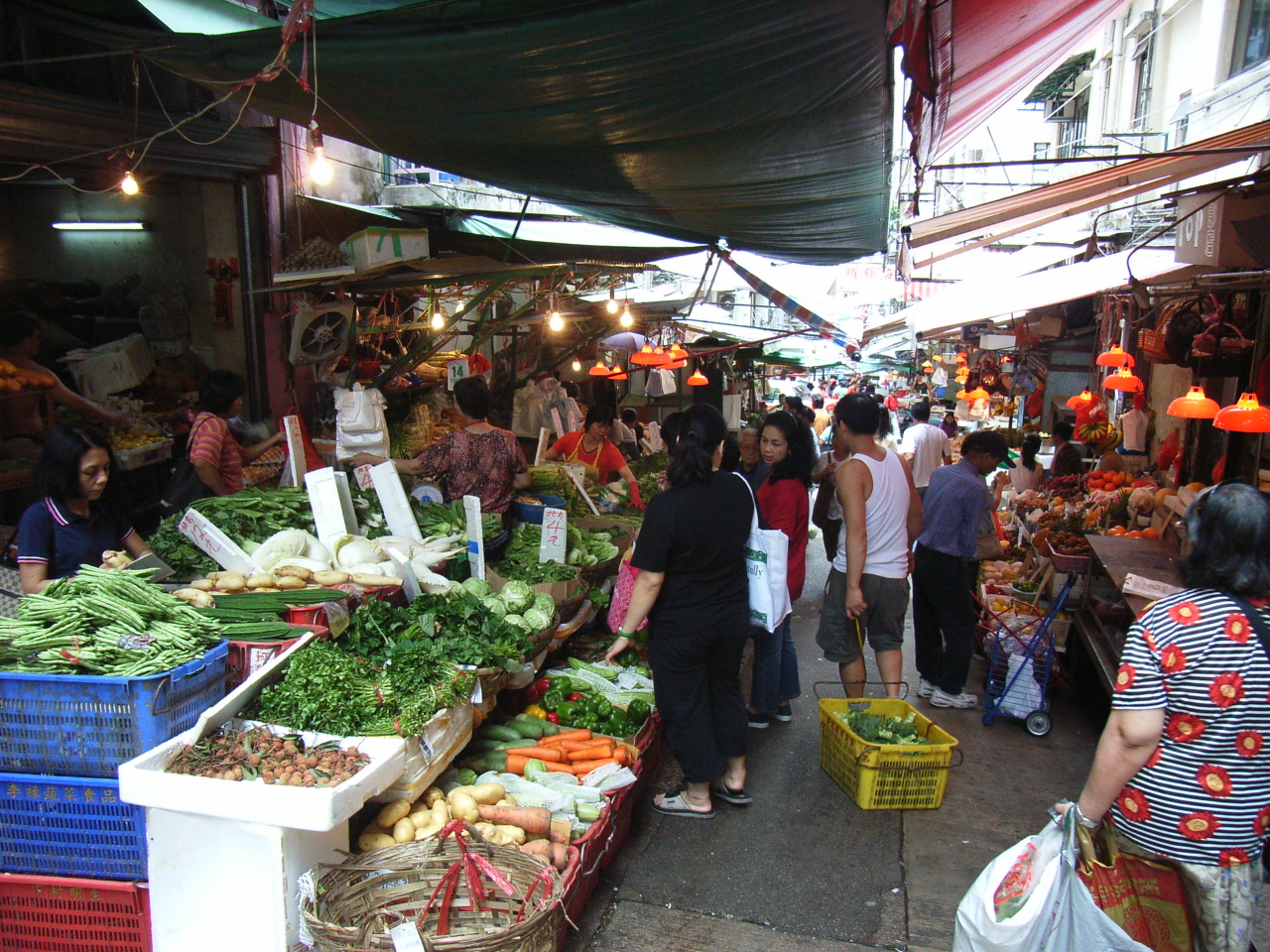
Graham Street market.

In 2007, the URA announced a plan to demolish several city blocks of old tong lau on Graham Street (Chinese: 嘉咸街) and Peel Street (Chinese: 卑利街), replacing them with a $3.8 billion scheme comprising four high-rises: two residential blocks, one office tower, and a hotel. Some 360 property owners and 1,120 residents in 37 existing buildings, built from the pre-war years to the 1960s, have been affected. In the process the URA plans to also evict the oldest wet market in the city, founded 1841. The plan was submitted to and approved by the Town Planning Board in early 2007. The market is considered culturally significant by many Hong Kong people for its vibrancy, "unique cultural landscape", and its preservation of "a very traditional Chinese way of life".

The Central and Western Concern Group, a coalition of ten community groups, pointed out that the destruction of the market, a tourist attraction, would "bring its rich and dynamic history to an end" and that many of the vendors did not want to be evicted. The shop owners lamented the high rent levels elsewhere, the cost of relocation, the emotional attachment they held to the longstanding marketplace and the loss of their customer base. In opposition to the redevelopment, a Graham Street Market Festival was organised in November 2007 to showcase the "cultural treasures and unique features" of the market with the aim of encouraging the government to "rethink its town planning policy". Support was lent by TVB celebrity chef Chow Chung, who offered cooking classes with ingredients purchased from the market. A second such festival was held in November 2008.

The URA responded to this backlash through several proposals. They promised the redevelopment would incorporate an "old shops street" which would, according to managing director Billy Lam Chung-lun, "bring back the old charm and streetscapes". The Central and Western Concern Group called the plan "artificial" given that such an environment already exists, and that the so-called "decorated stage" would take too long to build. Secondly, the URA also promised to build a two-storey wet market complex on a lot labelled "site B" to house the displaced vendors. This plan was criticised as the proposed building would accommodate fewer than half the vendors currently operating in the area. By 2013, though vendors had been served eviction notices, no wet market had been constructed.

=== Kwun Tong Town Centre redevelopment project ===
The major criticism of the Kwun Tong Town Centre redevelopment project, was the scandal that the URA altered the original redevelopment plan repetitively without underwent any formal public consultation procedures. It was initially proposed to create a unique "goose egg" shaped office and retail complex at the center of the redevelopment project with a consensus within the Kwun Tong community dating back in 2007.

In 2007, URA initially proposed to create a unique "goose-egg" shaped multipurpose complex at Hong Ming Road, which is the center of the development project. The "goose-egg" proposal was applauded when seen in plans laid on general public. However, later in June 2017, the authority has submitted a revised planning layout regarding the Development Area 4&5 to the Town Planning Board, which revised layout differ greatly from the original planning, the "goose-egg" shaped landmark architecture was taken out, and the terrace-garden design with water features was absent. The change of plan was kept opaque from the Town Planning Board to the non-executive directors in the URA and Kwun Tong District Council, not to mention local residents in Kwun Tong. In response to public criticisms, URA explained the change was caused by management and practicability issue. Major URA stakeholder Miss Judy Chan Ka-pui, non-executive director of the authority, also member of the New People's Party and Southern District Council for South Horizons West, whose role is one more of monitoring the authority, however claimed she had been "kept in the dark" about the changes laid out in a plan submitted to the Town Planning Board, and she stressed that the revised design had not been finalized and could still be discussed, that the authority would attend the next meetings of the working group, plus to collect views of the district councilors. Lawmaker and Kwun Tong district councilor Jonathan Ho Kai-ming criticized that the authority made this move only after it was put under pressure.

On 7 November 2017, URA announced in a meeting in the Kwun Tong District Council that the 'goose-egg' shaped office and retail complex will be retained in the redevelopment plan. Similarly, the revised plan was not subjected to any public consultation process. The arbitrary revision of plans clearly indicates a lack of transparency, public understanding and accountability in the URA's decision-making process. In regard to this, the public prompts the organization to hold a formal and open public consultation and no to keep the public in the dark, local councilors suggested that Kwun Tong residents should be well consulted over the design of this multi-billion dollar project. Pan-democrat lawmaker Jeremy Tam Man-ho further criticized the URA for resuming the design of the "goose egg" because of worries over practicality, he cited the authority's reply to the district council stating that the "goose egg" design was taken out to make it more practical and easier to manage for sake of profitable outcomes.

Apart from being criticized for the vanished "goose-egg" major design, URA has been criticized aiming to reap profits with private developers by constructing luxurious flats rather than providing affordable housing to residents. Albert Cheng criticized that URA used market prices to buy up old buildings, however sets compensation benchmark at the price of seven-year-old buildings in the area. While the redevelopment project involves one of the poorest districts in Hong Kong, the act of URA has been blasted for going against the fundamental principle of gentrification of old districts.

After encountering numerous criticism and receiving different stakeholders' views during the Town Planning Board's consultation, the "goose-egg" shaped landmark architecture and the terrace-garden design with water features are retained in the latest design released in Nov 2017. However, iconic features are still different from the original generally-welcomed design. The "goose egg" shaped architecture now is only a "half-egg" design and the terrace-garden is smaller than the original one. A large commercial development has raised the original height restrictions by 20 meters, thereby creating more areas for retail shopping, offices and hotel business. The footfall design apparently tended to lead the car-free, pedestrian-friendly zone to walk through a big shopping mall to get to public transport or car park, thereby highly increased shopper volume. The revised design has been further criticized as shifting in favor of commercial operators and developers.

== List of projects ==
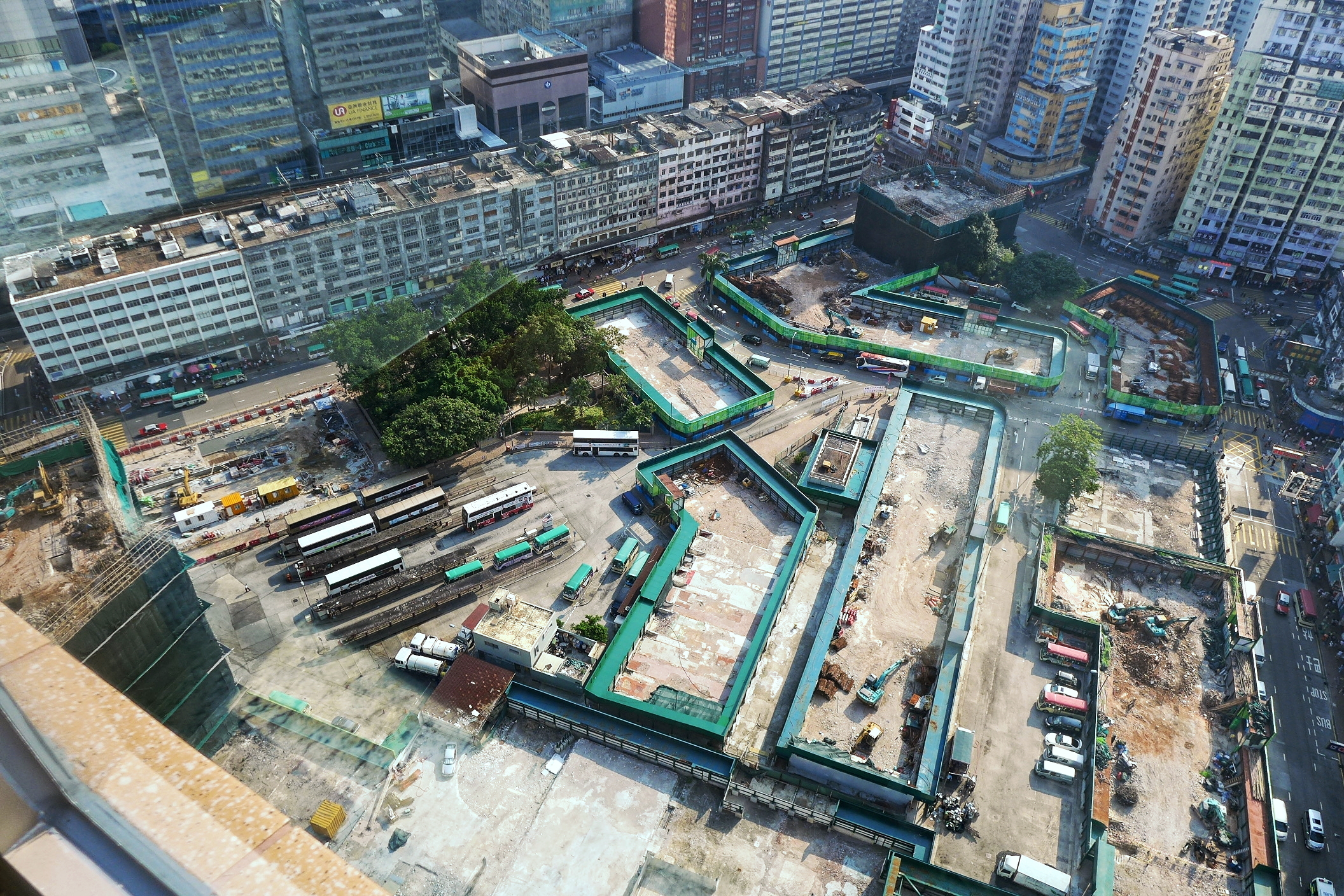
A vast area demolished in Kwun Tong Town Centre, which will become a large indoor shopping centre

This list is not exhaustive. It also includes projects by the former Land Development Corporation.

=== Completed projects ===
- The Center, Central (1998)
- Grand Millennium Plaza and Cosco Tower, Sheung Wan (1998)
- Langham Place, Mong Kok (2004)
- The Merton, Kennedy Town (2005)
- Waterloo Road/Yunnan Lane Project (8 Waterloo Road), Yau Ma Tei
- The Masterpiece, Tsim Sha Tsui (2007)
- Tsuen Wan Town Centre redevelopment (Vision City and Citywalk) (2007)
- Sheung Wan Fong (the public square adjacent to Western Market)
- Florient Rise, Tai Kok Tsui (2009)
- Island Crest, Sai Ying Pun (2010)
- Lee Tung Street (2016)

=== Current projects ===
- Kwun Tong Town Centre demolition and redevelopment
- Tai Kok Tsui (numerous projects)
- Kowloon City (numerous projects)
- Sham Shui Po (numerous projects)
- Graham/Peel Street redevelopment
- Nga Tsin Wai Village redevelopment
- Nos. 600–626 Shanghai Street, Mong Kok

=== Proposed projects ===
- Revitalization/Preservation Project of 72-74A Stone Nullah Lane, 2–8 Hing Wan Street and 8 King Sing Street.
- Mallory Street/Burrows Street Project

== Chairmen ==
=== Land Development Corporation ===
- Hu Fa-kuang (1988–1992)
- Steven Poon (1992–1994)
- Andrew Li (1994–1996)
- Lau Wah-sum (1996–2001)

=== Urban Renewal Authority ===
- Lau Wah-sum (2001–2004)
- Edward Cheng (2004–2007)
- Barry Cheung (2007–2013)
- Victor So Hing-woh (2013–2019)
- Chow Chung-kong (2019–present)

== See also ==
- Air pollution in Hong Kong
- Architecture of Hong Kong
- Heritage conservation in Hong Kong

== Notes ==
Bibliography

- Shelton, Barrie; Karakiewicz, Justyna; Kvan, Thomas (2011). The Making of Hong Kong: From Vertical to Volumetric. Abingdon: Routledge. ISBN 978-0-415-48701-6.
