= Lee Tung Street =

Former street in Wan Chai, Hong Kong

Coordinates: 22°16′32.2″N 114°10′20.3″E

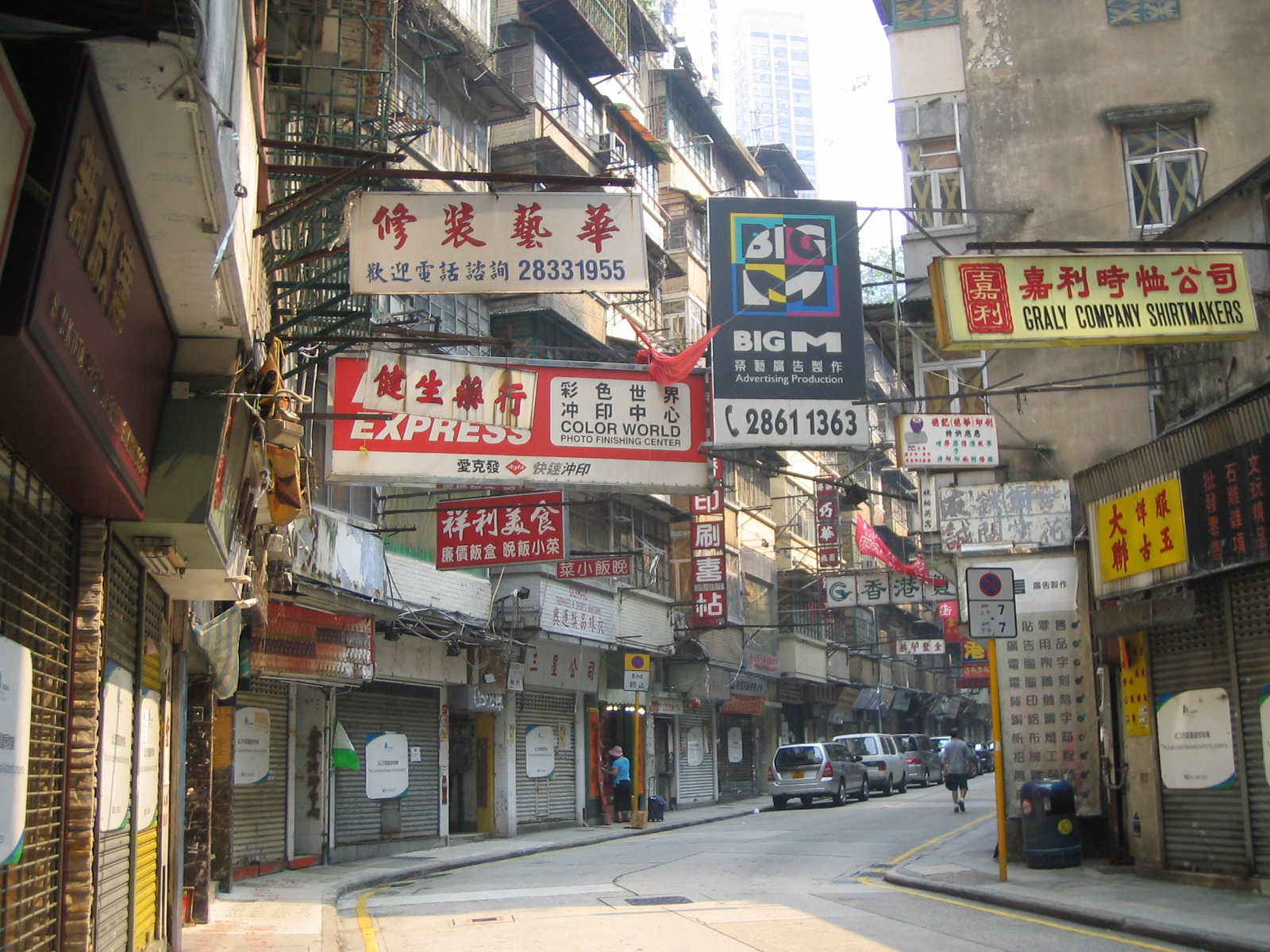
- Streetscape of Lee Tung Street in 2006, before its demolition
- Traditional Chinese: 利東街
- Simplified Chinese: 利东街
Transcriptions
Standard Mandarin
- Hanyu Pinyin: Lìdōng Jiē
Yue: Cantonese
- Yale Romanization: lei6 dung1 gaai1

Wedding Card Street
- Chinese: 喜帖街（囍帖街）
- Literal meaning: joyous posters street
Transcriptions

Lee Tung Street (Chinese: 利東街), known as Wedding Card Street (喜帖街; 囍帖街) by locals, is a street in Wan Chai, Hong Kong. In its heyday, the street was famous in Hong Kong and abroad as a centre for the design and manufacture of wedding cards, as well as other printed materials and publications.

As part of an Urban Renewal Authority (URA) project, all property interests of Lee Tung Street were returned to the Government of Hong Kong on 6 November 2005, and all the buildings in the street were subsequently demolished in December 2007. The demolition was seen by many as causing irreparable damage to the cultural heritage of Hong Kong.

The site was redeveloped into a luxury housing and shopping precinct. As with all other URA projects, none of the original tenants were resettled on the site, thus drawing 50 years of printing heritage on Lee Tung Street to an untimely close.

== History ==
Named for the Lee Tung Construction Company, whose premises originally occupied the site, the street had a long association with the printing industry, which flourished in the 1950s when the Government of Hong Kong mandated that all printing shops be located on Lee Tung Street – allegedly this was done to facilitate monitoring for any illegal material which might be published by the printers.

The poet and translator Dai Wangshu established a short-lived bookstore on Lee Tung Street in the early 1950s.

In the 1970s, the print shops began producing wedding invitations, lai see, fai chun, and printed materials, for which they became famous in the 1980s. Hundreds of thousands of Hong Kongers visited the shops to order their wedding cards, business cards, and traditional Chinese calendars.

== Redevelopment ==
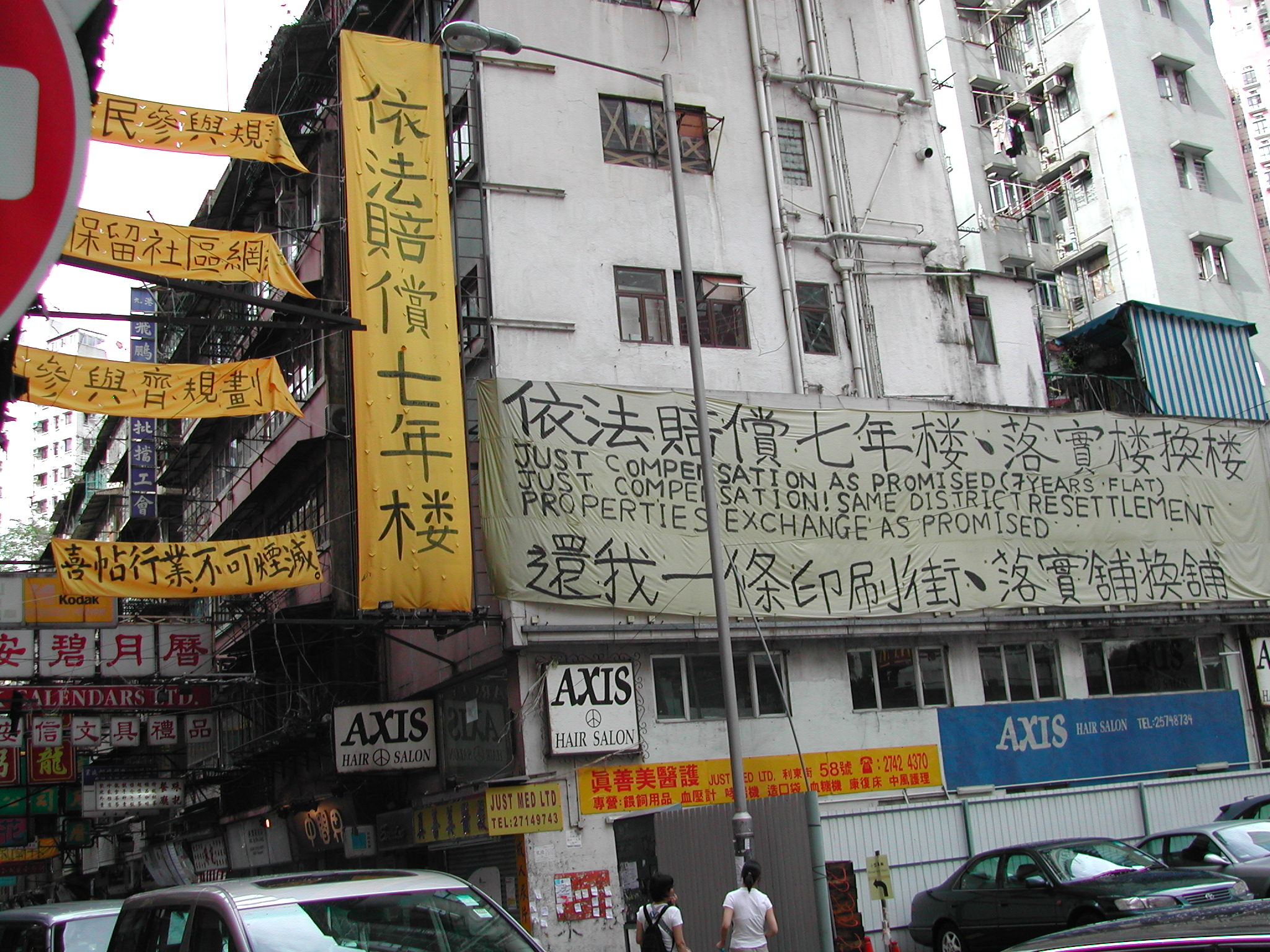
Banners brandished all over Lee Tung Street in protest against its demolition and forced eviction of its tenants.

In 2003, the Urban Renewal Authority (URA) announced it would spend HK$3.58 billion to redevelop Lee Tung Street and McGregor Street – an area covering 8,900 square metres (96,000 sq ft). According to an authority spokesman, up until the end of June 2005, more than 85 per cent of the 647 affected homeowners on Lee Tung Street had agreed to accept compensation offers of HK$4,079 per square foot. The purchase of the land was expected to be completed by early 2006, and demolition works commenced in December 2007 to make way for four high-rise residential buildings, and one underground car park, alongside new shops whose character would fit in with the proposed image of the street as a "Wedding City".

On behalf of the H15 Concern Group, architect Christopher Law produced a counter-proposal known as the "Dumbbell Proposal" which would have preserved the signature six-storey tong lau in the central part of the street. However, despite support for the proposal, and strong protests by residents (including a three-day hunger strike by 60-year-old shop owner May Je) and other activists, the URA and the government proceeded to demolish the street as planned.

Plans to redevelop Lee Tung Street into an upmarket residential and shopping precinct had been in the pipeline as early as 1998; the following timeline illustrates the sequence of events:

=== Lee Tung Street Urban Renewal Timeline ===
- 1998 – The Land Development Corporation announced the Development Scheme Plan, including The Lee Tung Street / McGregor Street Project (H15)
- 1998 – The Town Development Board approved the Development Scheme Plan.
- 1999 – The Chief Executive in Council approved the Development Scheme Plan.
- 2001 – The Urban Renewal Authority was established, and replaced the Land Development Corporation, as the latter's efficiency in redevelopment was not considered satisfactory.
- 2003 – The Urban Renewal Authority conducted an occupancy survey.
- 2004 – The Urban Renewal Authority released the letter for the land and property acquisition in the affected area of the H15 Urban Renewal Plan.
- 2005 – The H15 Concern Group submitted their own redevelopment proposal (the Dumbbell Proposal (啞鈴方案)) which was presented with a silver award by the Hong Kong Institute of Planners, but was rejected by the Town Planning Board (城規會).
- 2007 – The H15 Concern Group failed to appeal the decision made by the Town Planning Board in the Appeal Board Panel.
- 2009 – The Urban Renewal Authority started a public tendering for the H15 Urban Renewal Plan.
- 2009 – The Urban Renewal Authority announced that Sino Land Company and Hopewell Holdings won the tender for a joint development contract, enabling them to commence the H15 Urban Renewal Plan.

=== Procedures and institutions involved ===
1. Urban Renewal Authority submits a development scheme plan to the Town Planning Board.
2. Town Planning Board Secretariat processes the submission.
3. Town Planning Board decides if the plan submitted is suitable for exhibition or not.
4. Town Planning Board arranges publication of the development scheme plan in the Gazette.
5. Town Planning Board publishes the development scheme plan.
6. Urban Renewal Authority publishes the development scheme in the Gazette.
7. Urban Renewal Authority carries out a survey in the affected area.
8. Town Planning Board considers objections to the development scheme plan.
9. Town Planning Board submits the development scheme plan to the Chief Executive in Council.

Wan Chai District Council published a paper in October 2004 entitled "Our Urban Renewal of Wan Chai" which put forward the following four principles for ethical renewal:

1. Renewal is not Redevelopment: Supporting the direction of the Sustainable Development Committee, the Council agrees that the best way to improve the environment of old districts is not through demolition and reconstruction, but through community renewal. Community renewal can allow for the coexistence of old and new. The current approach of completely evacuating residents, and destroying vibrant communities is putting the cart before the horse.
2. People-centred and Diverse Choices: "People-centred" means respecting and acknowledging human diversity. A one-size-fits-all compensation plan is not the most flexible [solution]; urban renewal must deeply understand the needs of affected property owners, and provide them with diverse choices. This is what "people-centred" truly means.
3. Respect for Community and Cultural Identity: "Community" is a connection between individuals. Urban renewal is not a project started on a blank slate; it requires acknowledging, respecting, and protecting the community as an "organism."
4. Community Participation: Involve citizens affected by the renewal process, jointly negotiating the direction, conditions, and procedures for development. Citizens should be given more space to participate in the community renewal process, encouraging the growth of civil society.

Further to the above, Wan Chai District Council commissioned the University of Hong Kong to conduct a survey into residents' opinions regarding the redevelopment project. The survey concluded that more than 70% of people living in the affected area agreed to the redevelopment of Lee Tung Street. This prompted the Council to urge the Urban Renewal Authority to commence redevelopment work as soon as possible.

== Lee Tung Avenue ==
Lee Tung Avenue 利東街

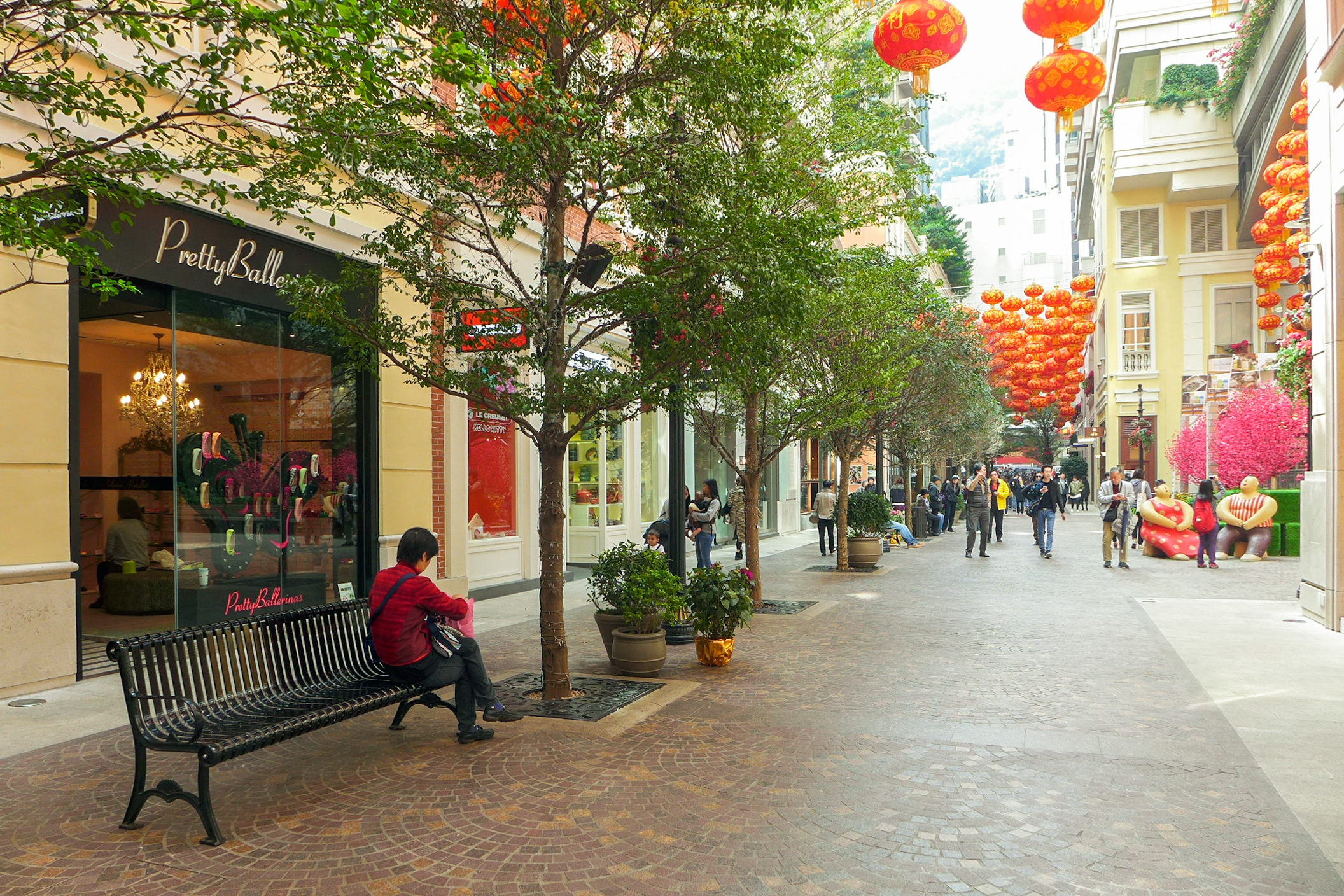

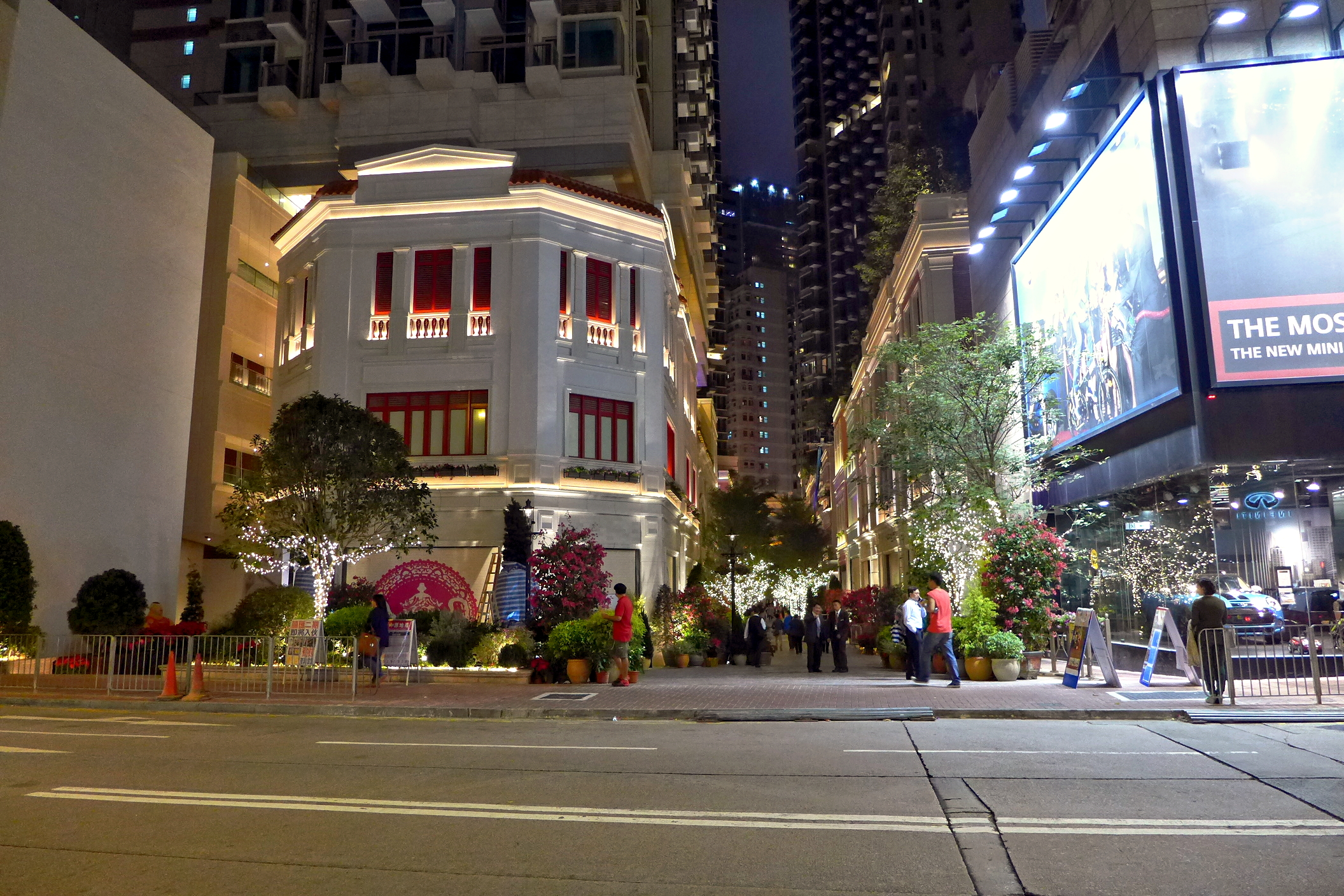
The current site of Lee Tung Street now forms part of a shopping mall.

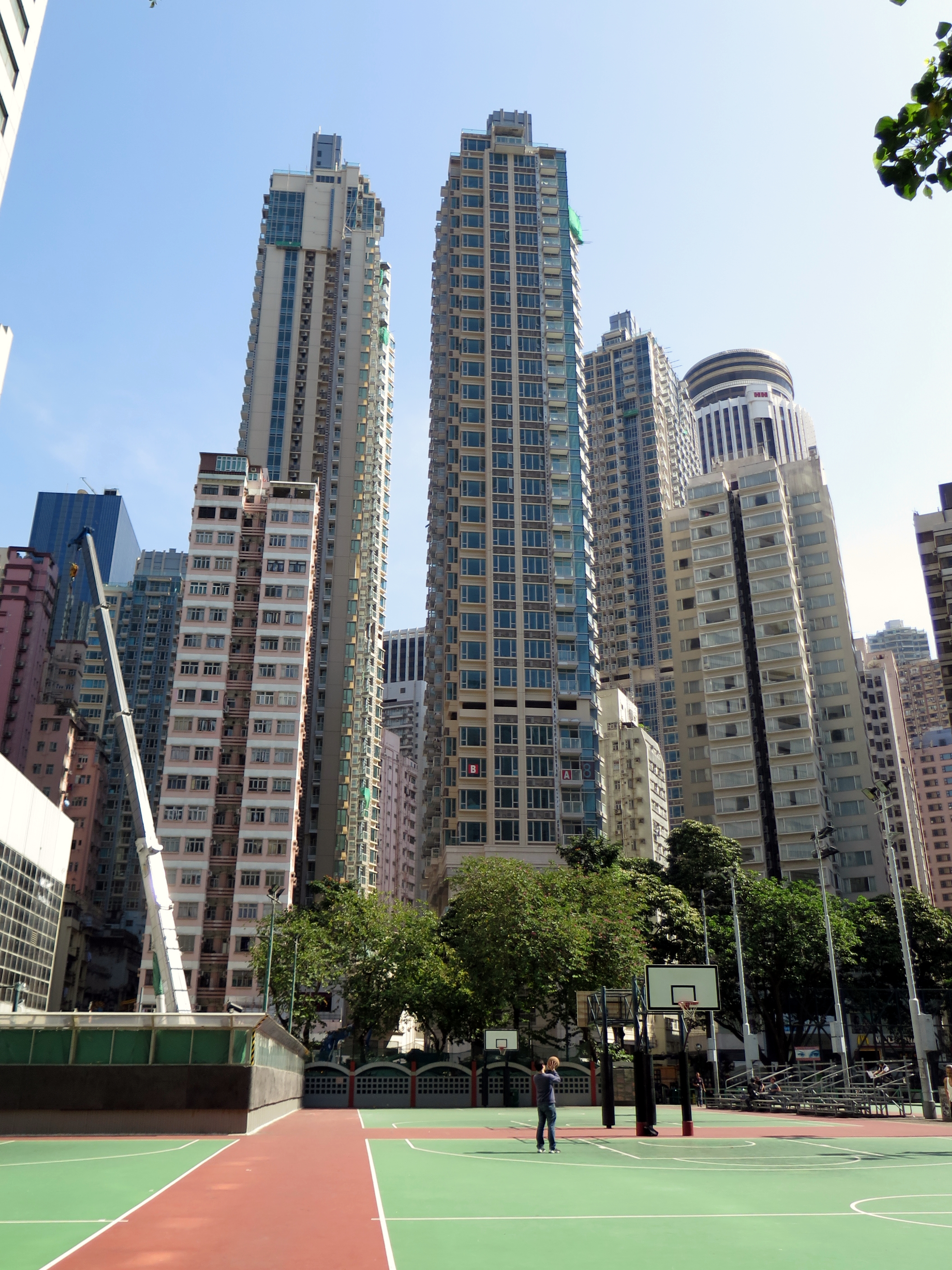
The Avenue

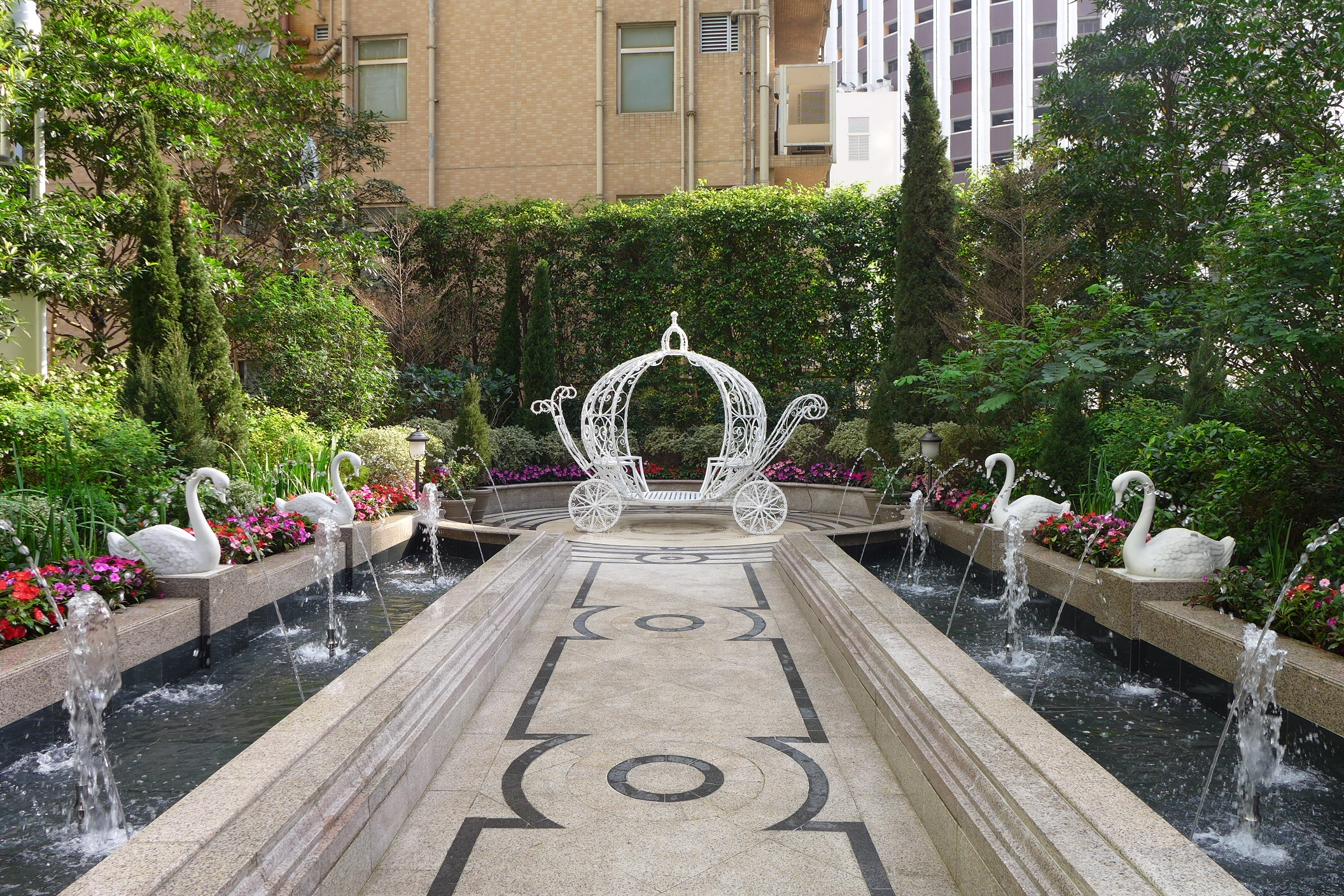
Lee Tung Avenue Level 5 podium garden is a public open space

In June 2013, the Urban Renewal Authority (URA) began accepting applications for new commercial tenants on the street, and formally announced the new name "Avenue Walk" (囍歡里). The Chinese name was a pun on the phrase "I Like You". This pun resulted in widespread derision. Finally, Sino Land, Hopewell Holdings, and the URA announced the new name would be "Lee Tung Avenue" (利東街) in October 2015, using the street's old Chinese name.

== Evaluation ==
=== In 2010 ===
The extent to which the H15 Urban Renewal Plan meets the 12 objectives spelled out in the Urban Renewal Strategy is set out in the table below (extracted directly from University of Hong Kong's Study Report: The Achievements and Challenges of Urban Renewal in Hong Kong):

	Objective	Achievements
a	Restructuring and re-planning designated target areas	Adopted an area-based approach based on a district base planning study - "Wan Chai Master Thinking"
b	Designing more effective and environmentally-friendly local transport and road networks	Pedestrianization of Lee Tung Street and the provision of underground connection to the MTR, off-street parking and loading- unloading area. The re-provisioning of the refuse collection point and public toilets located at the junction of Cross Street and Spring Garden Lane into the site which would improve vehicular circulation along Spring Garden Lane
c	Rationalizing land uses	The re-provision of refuse collection point and public toilet.
d	Redeveloping dilapidated buildings into new buildings of modern standard and environmentally- friendly design	Environmentally friendly features are included, e.g. water-cooling air-conditioning, grey water recycling system, solar energy systems, etc.
e	Promoting sustainable development in the urban area	Achievements in economic and environmental aspects are more obvious and less debatable. However, social aspects of sustainable development are contentious.
f	Promoting the rehabilitation of buildings in need of repair	Not applicable
g	Preserving buildings, sites and structures of historical, cultural or architectural interest	Three pre-war shop houses (Grade II historic buildings) within the site will be conserved and put to adaptive re-uses
h	Preserving as far as practicable local characteristics	Preserve the existing streetscape by maintaining the height, scale and style of the shop-houses at street level. To retain the active street level character, the street will maintain their active mixed uses with commercial, retail, restaurant, etc.
i	Preserving the social networks of the local community	This is one of the most controversial parts of the project. The efforts made by the URA include: smaller units in the future residential towers will be designed with overall average flat size about 52m2 (GFA). Units of less than 50m2 GFA would also be provided to enhance the probability for the original residents to purchase a new and affordable flat in H15 (As to whether such flats would be affordable to the previous owner-occupiers in the future is unknown. For instance, in the J-Residence, a URA project, there were 7 transaction recorded in early 2010 before this report was written, the price ranges from $11,357/ft2 to $13,799/ft2 for flat sizes ranging from 449 to 585 ft.) - non-domestic portion of Site B is proposed to be retained for possible social enterprises or social capital projects to facilitate the preservation of the social network and building up of social capital in old Wan Chai - a 3,000m2 saleable floor area of the non- domestic portion will become a Wedding City comprising wedding themed shops where the original wedding card shops will be allowed to return, which originally occupied about 1,400 m2 of saleable floor area. Hence, the provision should be more than sufficient to cater for potential interest. However, whether shop owners would return to the redeveloped site is still unknown.
j	Providing purpose-built housing for groups with special needs, such as the elderly and the disabled	A residential care home for the elderly (RCHE) cum day care unit (DCU) is included in the site area
k	Providing more open space and community/welfare facilities	Public Open Space: Not less than 3,000m2 – Community facilities: Re-provisioning of refuse collection point and public toilet Welfare facilities: the RCHE cum DCU
l	Enhancing the townscape with attractive landscape and urban design	Reduced site coverage via pedestrianized streets and open spaces to enable various landscaping improvement in the area, including street trees and ornamental planting to increase the amount of green space, and vertical greening to the façade of the new buildings. Set back building lines to create new plazas at Johnston Road and Queen's Road East. Enhanced pedestrian connectivity through breaking up the low rise building blocks along Lee Tung Street.

The report concludes that whilst the H15 Urban Renewal Project met most of the objectives spelt out in the Urban Renewal Strategy, those which it had failed to satisfy were related to social aspects – chiefly the preservation of the social network. Despite the Urban Renewal Authority claiming to have made provisions to enhance such efforts, given the fact that all the residents and commercial operators have left the site without any existing explicit arrangement for their return, the chances of re-establishing such a social network are slim.

=== New social movement, and "flat-for-flat" and "shop-for-shop" compensation ===
Following the failure of preserving Lee Tung Street – together with the protests against the demolition of the Star Ferry Pier and Queen's Pier, and the recent controversy about the construction of the Express Rail Link – Hong Kongers have become increasingly concerned with the preservation of local community, local characteristics, cultural assets, and collective memories. The struggle made by H15 Concern Group and its supporters is now usually considered an important landmark in the "new social movement", which emphasises post-materialist values like culture and heritage. The experience in Lee Tung Street nurtured a new generation of activists – most prominently Eddie Chu – and led to the development of more sophisticated tactics for use in future social movements. Other issues in urban renewal, including community participatory planning, owners' participation in redevelopment, "flat-for-flat" and "shop-for-shop" compensation are all reflected in the case of the H15 Urban Renewal Plan.

== In popular culture ==
The song Wedding Card Street 囍帖街 (歌曲), written by Cantopop lyricist Wyman Wong for the singer Kay Tse is an elegy for Lee Tung Street. The song topped all charts in Hong Kong, holding the No.1 position throughout 2008.

== See also ==
- List of streets and roads in Hong Kong
