= Lime Stardom =

Building in Tai Kok Tsui, Hong Kong

Coordinates: 22.321056°N 114.165158°E

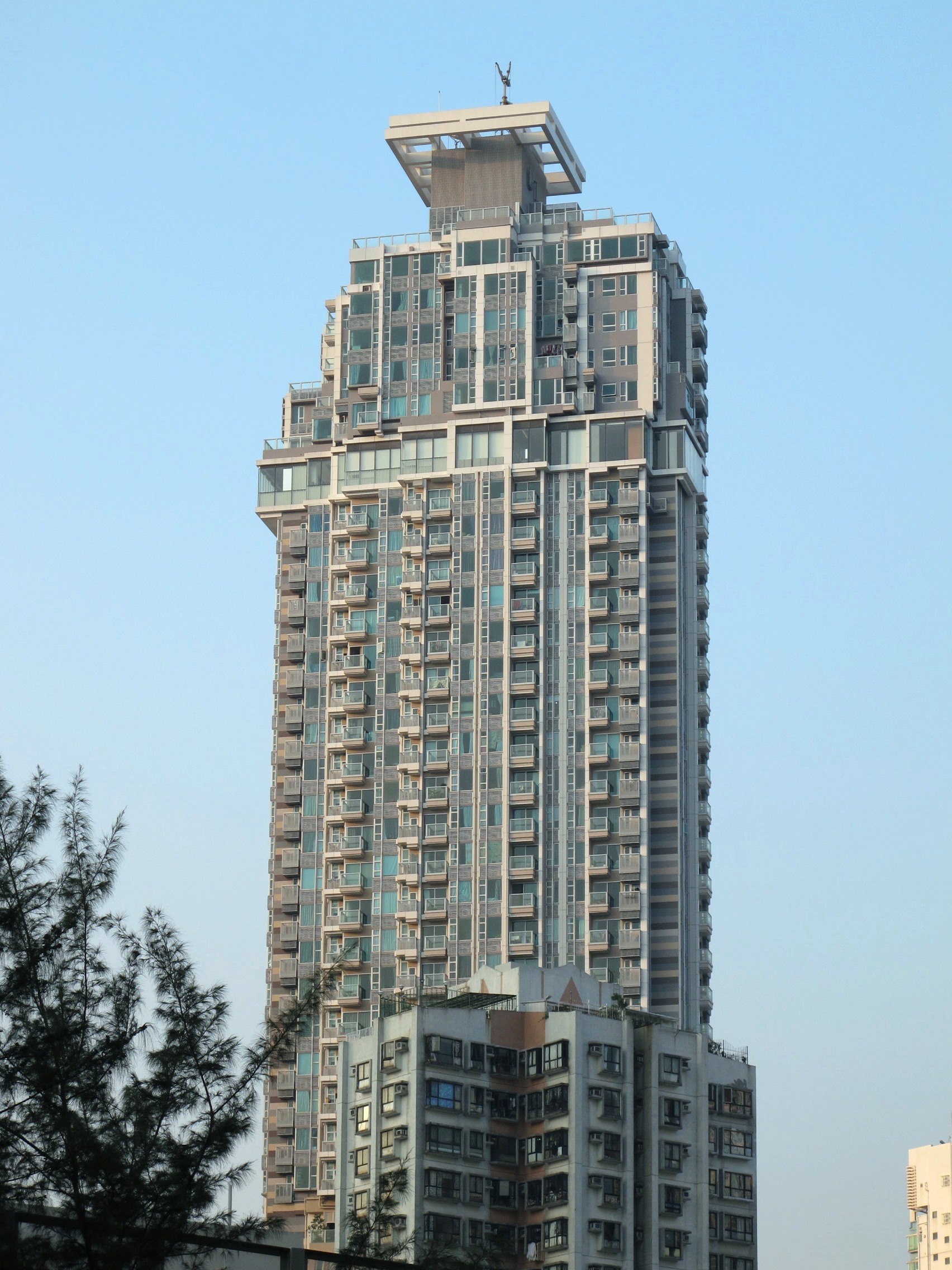
Lime Stardom

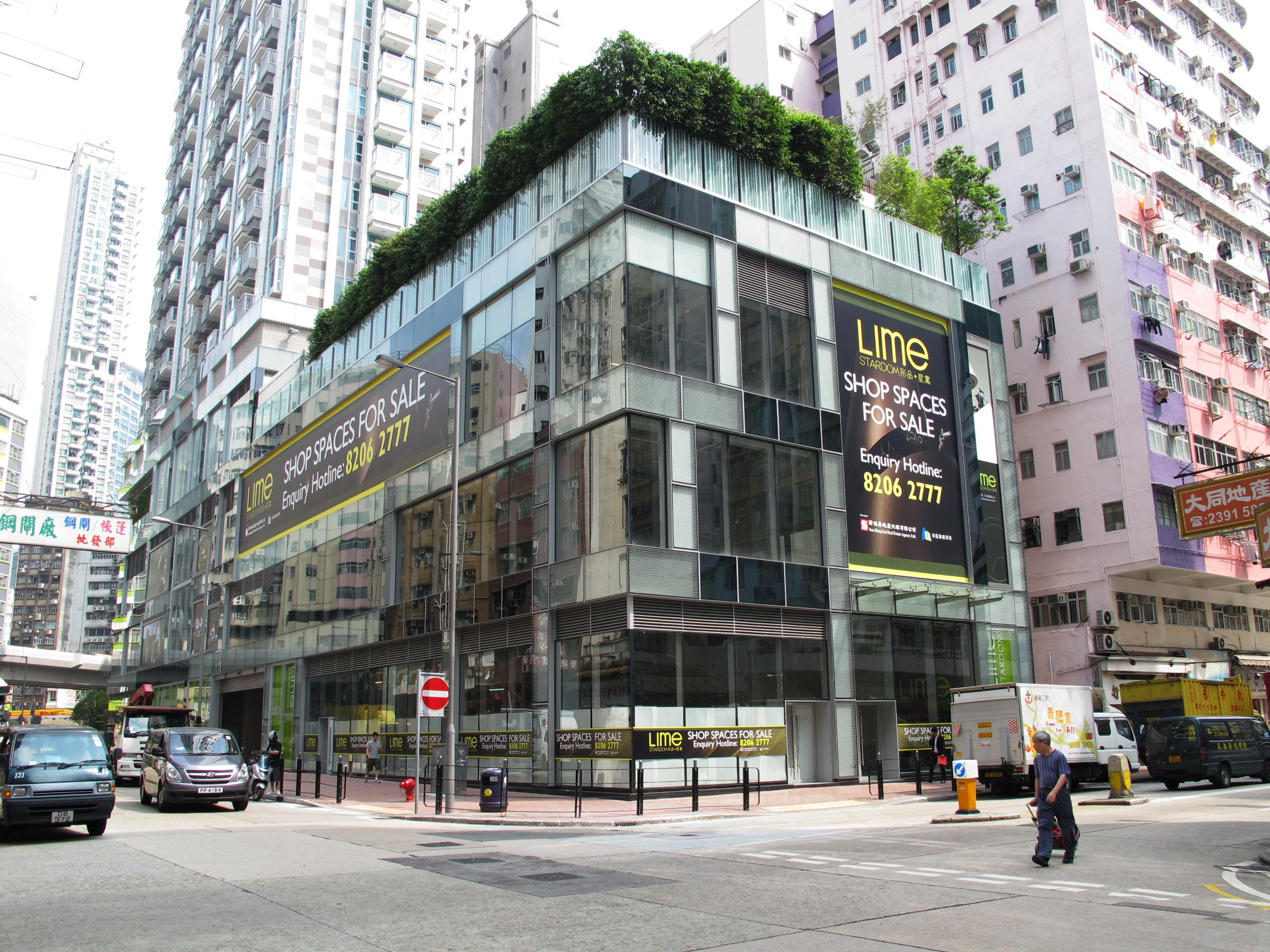
Lime Stardom shopping arcade.

Lime Stardom (Chinese: 形品·星寓; Jyutping: jing4 ban2, seng1 jyu6) is a residential and commercial building located at 1 Larch Street, Tai Kok Tsui, Yau Tsim Mong District, Kowloon, Hong Kong. It was developed by Sun Hung Kai Properties and the Urban Renewal Authority.

The development has been described as a "boutique apartment". It is 165 metres (541 ft) tall and 37 storeys with 377 units including studio flats, one- to three-bedroom apartments and special penthouse units. It also contains a shopping arcade.
