= Kelvin Lam =

Hong Kong politician

Kelvin Lam Member of Southern District Council
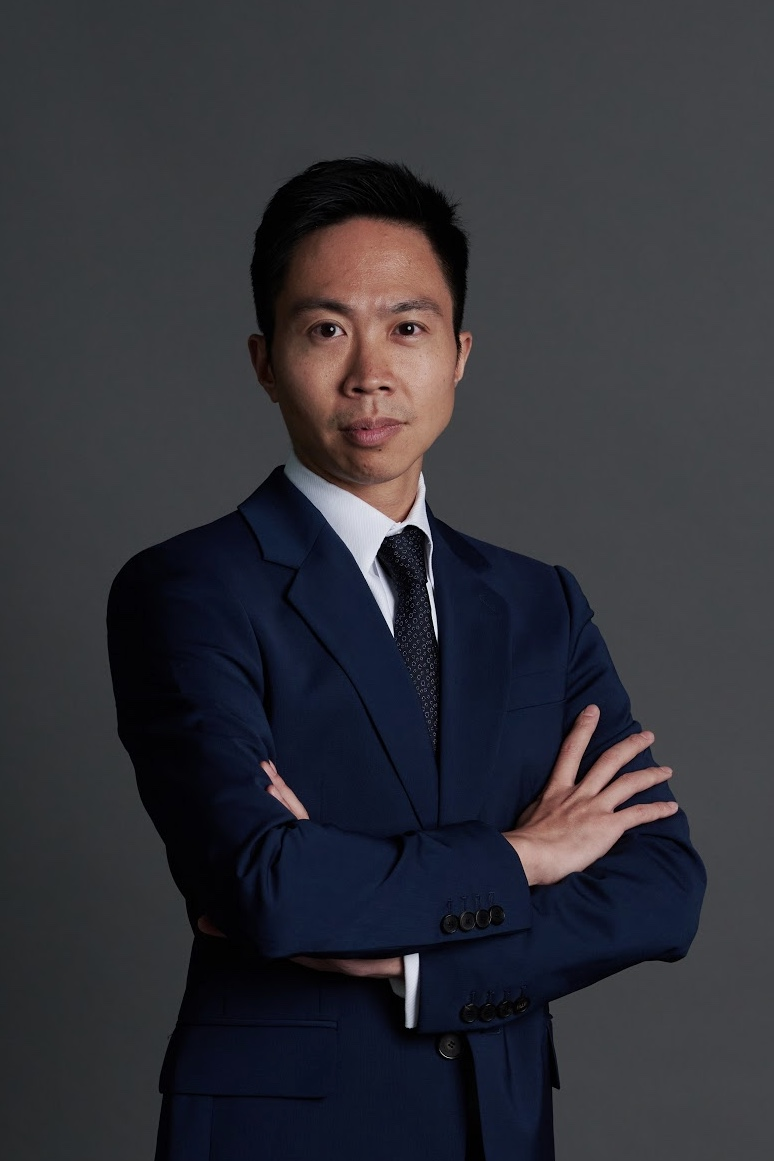

Southern District Council Member
- In office 1 January 2020 – 9 July 2021
- Preceded by: Judy Chan
- Constituency: South Horizons West

Personal details
- Born: 1979 (age 46–47) British Hong Kong
- Party: Independent
- Education: London School of Economics and Political Science MSc Management, 2003; University of York MSc Economics, 2002; University of Southampton BSc Economics & Finance, 2001
- Profession: Economist
- Website: Kelvin Lam on Facebook

Kelvin Ho-Por Lam (Chinese: 林浩波, born June 1979) is a Hong Kong politician and macro-economist who formerly served as Southern District Councillor for the South Horizons (West) from 2020 until 2021. He was a former Greater China Economist with HSBC Global Markets. Before joining HSBC, he was a member of the Asia economics team at Citigroup Global Markets in Hong Kong.

== Political involvement ==
Upon his return to Hong Kong in early 2015, he has been participating in the civil society. He is now a member of the Southern District Council. He also provides economic advisory to the Office of LegCo Councillor, Au Nok Hin.

He planned to run for a seat in Hong Kong’s legislative council functional constituency (financial services sector) due to take place in September 2020, but which was postponed by the Hong Kong government amid a rise in virus cases.

== District Councillor ==
In terms of his recent work as a councillor, he wrote on the contentious issue of bailing out the failing Ocean Park Hong Kong. He blames the cause of the park's downfall on government's policy error. The Hong Kong government introduced CEPA (Individual Visitor's Scheme) in 2003, aiming to forge closer economic ties with China. However, the underlining agenda was to make the local economy more reliant on Chinese demand, making the wider economy less diversified.
