= 2015 Southern District Council election =

Hong Kong local election

- 22 November 2015

All 17 seats to Southern District Council 9 seats needed for a majority
- Turnout: 50.5%
	First party	Second party
Party	Democratic	DAB
Last election	5 seats, 31.9%	2 seat, 20.0%
Seats before	4	2
Seats won	4	2
Seat change	Steady	Steady
Popular vote	14,966	8,452
Percentage	26.4%	14.9%
Swing	▼5.5%	▼5.1%
	Third party	Fourth party
Party	NPP	Liberal
Last election	0 seat, 4.1%	1 seat, 5.5%
Seats before	1	1
Seats won	1	1
Seat change	Steady	Steady
Popular vote	2,945	2,509
Percentage	5.2%	4.4%
Swing	▲1.1%	▼1.1%
- Colours on map indicate winning party for each constituency.

The 2015 Southern District Council election was held on 22 November 2015 to elect all 17 members to the Southern District Council.

Civic Party's legislator Kenneth Chan Ka-lok failed in challenging incumbent Lam Kai-fai in South Horizons East.

== Overall election results ==
Before election:

↓
5	12
Pro-democracy	Pro-Beijing

Change in composition:

↓
5	12
Pro-democracy	Pro-Beijing

Southern District Council election result 2015
Party	Seats	Gains	Losses	Net gain/loss	Seats %	Votes %	Votes	+/−
Independent	9	1	1	0	52.9	34.7	19,709	
Democratic	4	0	0	0	23.5	26.4	14,966	–5.5
DAB	2	0	0	0	11.8	14.9	8,452	–5.1
Civic	0	0	0	0	0	6.1	3,443	–0.2
NPP	1	0	0	0	5.9	5.2	2,945	+1.1
Liberal	1	0	0	0	5.9	4.4	2,509	−1.1
People Power	0	0	0	0	0	4.0	2,245	+3.1
Civic Passion	0	0	0	0	0	0.5	296	
