= 2011 Southern District Council election =

Hong Kong local election

- 6 November 2011

17 (of the 20) seats to Southern District Council 11 seats needed for a majority
- Turnout: 44.1%
	First party	Second party
Party	Democratic	DAB
Last election	3 seats, 20.2%	1 seat, 7.1%
Seats before	3	1
Seats won	5	2
Seat change	▲2	▲1
Popular vote	14,642	9,175
Percentage	31.9%	20.0%
Swing	▲11.7%	▲12.9%
	Third party	Fourth party
Party	Civic	Liberal
Last election	0 seat, 2.9%	1 seat, 6.7%
Seats before	1	1
Seats won	1	1
Seat change	Steady	Steady
Popular vote	2,915	2,517
Percentage	6.3%	5.5%
Swing	▲3.4%	▼0.4%
- Colours on map indicate winning party for each constituency.

The 2011 Southern District Council election was held on 6 November 2011 to elect all 17 elected members to the 20-member District Council.

== Overall election results ==
Before election:

↓
4	13
Pro-dem	Pro-Beijing

Change in composition:

↓
6	11
Pro-democracy	Pro-Beijing

Southern District Council election result 2011
Party	Seats	Gains	Losses	Net gain/loss	Seats %	Votes %	Votes	+/−
Democratic	5	2	0	+2	29.4	31.9	14,642	+11.7
Independent	8	0	3	−3	47.1	31.3	14,375	
DAB	2	1	0	+1	11.8	20.0	9,175	+12.9
Civic	1	0	0	0	5.9	6.3	2,915	+3.4
Liberal	1	0	0	0	5.9	5.5	2,517	−0.4
NPP	0	0	0	0	0	4.1	1,894	
People Power	0	0	0	0	0	0.9	403	
