= 2003 Southern District Council election =

Hong Kong local election

- 23 November 2003

17 (of the 21) seats to Southern District Council 11 seats needed for a majority
- Turnout: 45.3%
| | First party | Second party | Third party |
|---|---|---|---|
| Party | Democratic | Liberal | DAB |
| Last election | 2 seats, 29.7% | 2 seats, 2.1% | 2 seats, 10.4% |
| Seats before | 2 | 2 | 2 |
| Seats won | 2 | 2 | 1 |
| Seat change | Steady | Steady | ▼1 |
| Popular vote | 7,281 | 2,594 | 7,007 |
| Percentage | 20.2% | 7.2% | 19.4% |
| Swing | ▼9.5% | ▼5.1% | ▲9.0% |
- Colours on map indicate winning party for each constituency.

The 2003 Southern District Council election was held on 23 November 2003 to elect all 17 elected members to the 21-member District Council.

== Overall election results ==
Before election:

↓
| 2 | 15 |
| Pro-dem | Pro-Beijing |

Change in composition:

↓
| 2 | 15 |
| Pro-dem | Pro-Beijing |

Southern District Council election result 2003
| Party | Seats | Gains | Losses | Net gain/loss | Seats % | Votes % | Votes | +/− |
|---|---|---|---|---|---|---|---|---|
| Independent | 12 | 1 | 0 | +1 | 70.6 | 35.5 | 12,821 | |
| Democratic | 2 | 0 | 0 | 0 | 11.8 | 20.2 | 7,281 | −9.5 |
| DAB | 1 | 0 | 1 | −1 | 5.9 | 19.4 | 7,007 | +9.0 |
| Liberal | 2 | 0 | 0 | 0 | 11.8 | 7.2 | 2,594 | −5.1 |
