= 2007 Southern District Council election =

Hong Kong local election

- 18 November 2007

17 (of the 21) seats to Southern District Council 11 seats needed for a majority
- Turnout: 41.0%
	First party	Second party	Third party
Party	Democratic	DAB	Liberal
Last election	2 seats, 20.2%	1 seat, 19.4%	2 seats, 7.2%
Seats before	2	0	2
Seats won	3	1	1
Seat change	▲1	▲1	▼1
Popular vote	9,825	3,438	3,244
Percentage	20.2%	7.1%	6.7%
Swing	Steady	▼12.3%	▼0.5%
- Colours on map indicate winning party for each constituency.

The 2007 Southern District Council election was held on 18 November 2007 to elect all 17 elected members to the 21-member District Council.

== Overall election results ==
Before election:

↓
2	15
Pro-dem	Pro-Beijing

Change in composition:

↓
4	13
Pro-dem	Pro-Beijing

Southern District Council election result 2007
Party	Seats	Gains	Losses	Net gain/loss	Seats %	Votes %	Votes	+/−
Independent	12	1	2	−1	70.6	45.0	21,864	
Democratic	3	2	1	+1	17.6	20.2	9,825	±0.0
DAB	1	1	0	+1	5.9	7.1	3,438	−12.3
Liberal	1	0	1	−1	5.9	6.7	3,244	−0.5
Civic	0	0	0	0	0.0	2.9	1,415	
