= 1999 Southern District Council election =

1999 local election in Hong Kong

- 28 November 1999

17 (of the 21) seats to Southern District Council 11 seats needed for a majority
- Turnout: 36.3%
	First party	Second party	Third party
Party	Democratic	DAB	Liberal
Last election	4 seats, 29.5%	0 seat, 13.2%	2 seats, 6.1%
Seats before	4	0	2
Seats won	2	2	2
Seat change	▼2	▲2	Steady
Popular vote	7,330	2,558	507
Percentage	29.7%	10.4%	2.1%
Swing	▲0.2%	▼2.8%	▼4.0%
- Colours on map indicate winning party for each constituency.

The 1999 Southern District Council election was held on 28 November 1999 to elect all 17 elected members to the 21-member District Council.

== Overall election results ==
Before election:

↓
4	12
Pro-dem	Pro-Beijing

Change in composition:

↓
2	15
Pro-dem	Pro-Beijing

Southern District Council election result 1999
Party	Seats	Gains	Losses	Net gain/loss	Seats %	Votes %	Votes	+/−
Independent	11	2	1	+1	64.7	57.9	14,294	
Democratic	2	0	2	−2	11.8	29.7	7,330	−0.2
DAB	2	2	0	+2	11.8	10.4	2,558	−2.8
Liberal	2	1	1	0	11.8	2.1	507	−5.1
