= Town Planning Board =

Hong Kong planning body

- 城市規劃委員會

Statutory body overview
- Formed: November 1991
- Jurisdiction: Hong Kong Government
- Headquarters: 15/F, North Point Government Offices, 333 Java Road, North Point
- Minister responsible: Bernadette LINN, Chairperson
- Deputy Minister responsible: Lincoln Huang, Vice-chairman
- Child agencies: Metro Planning Committee; Rural and New Town Planning Committee

Town Planning Board
- Traditional Chinese: 城市規劃委員會
Transcriptions
Yue: Cantonese
- Yale Romanization: Sìhng síh kwāi waahk wái yùhn wuih
- Jyutping: Sing^{4} si^{5} kwai^{1} waak^{6} wai^{2} jyun^{4} wui^{6}

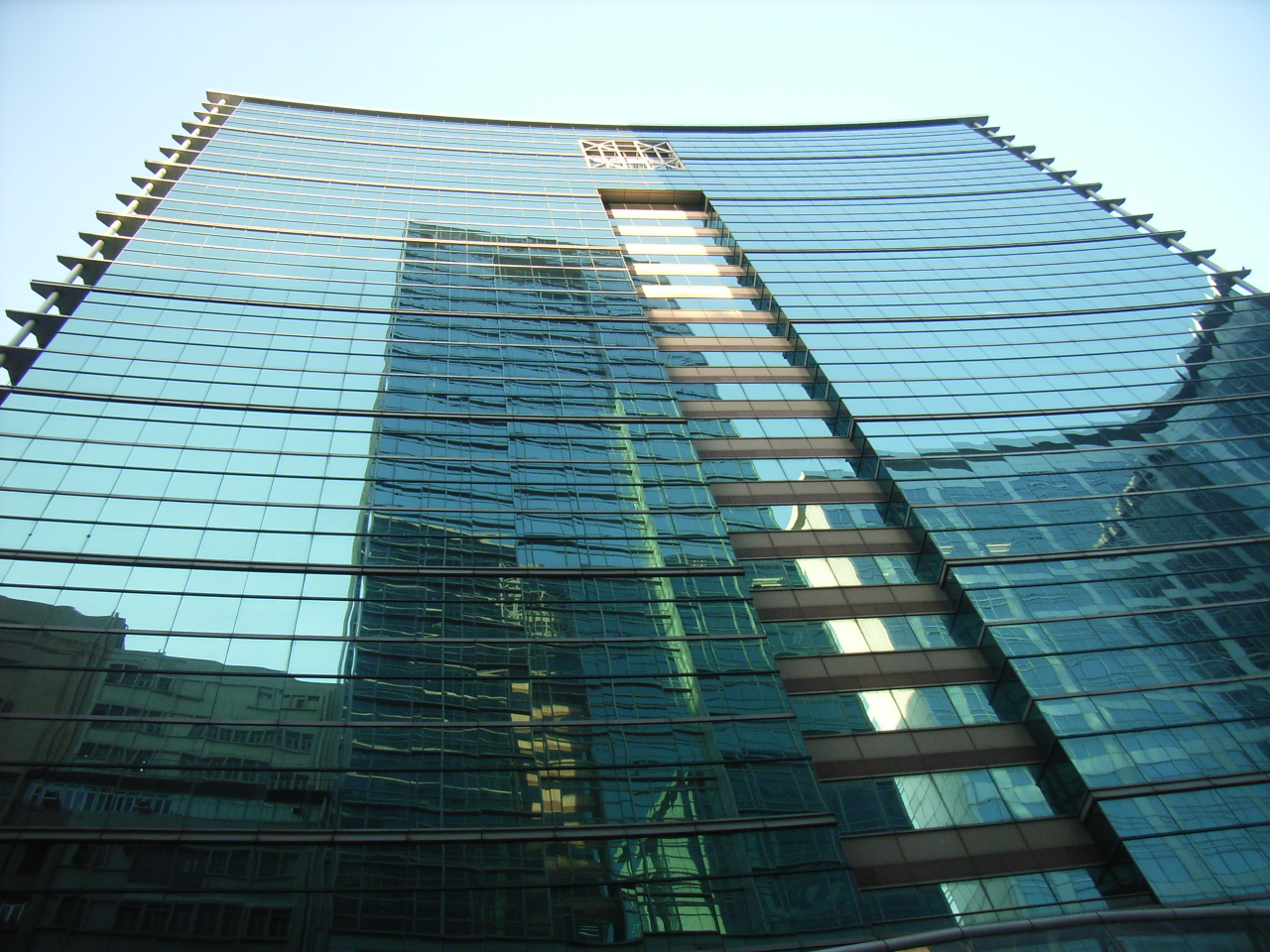
North Point Government Offices, home to the Town Planning Board Secretariat

The Town Planning Board (Chinese: 城市規劃委員會) is a statutory body of the Hong Kong Government tasked with developing urban plans with an aim to ensuring the "health, safety, convenience and general welfare of the community through the process of guiding and controlling the development and use of land, and to bring about a better organised, efficient and desirable place to live and work." It is founded upon section 2 of the Town Planning Ordinance.

== Function ==
The Town Planning Board designates and prepares new draft zoning plans, considers proposed layout plans under Comprehensive Development Area zoning, exhibits draft plans for public comment, considers applications for planning permission, and submits draft plans for approval by the Chief Executive in Council.

The Planning Department is the executive arm of the Town Planning Board. It creates plans on behalf of the TPB, provides technical services and enforces zoning restrictions.

== Composition ==
- Chairman
- Vice-chairman
- 5 other official members
- 28 non-official members

Members are appointed by the Chief Executive for a tenure of 1-2 years. They serve on either the Metro Planning Committee (MPC) concerning Hong Kong Island, Kowloon and Tsuen Wan, or the Rural and New Town Planning Committee (RNTPC), covering the New Territories excluding Tsuen Wan.

== Plans and zones ==
=== Outline Zoning Plan (OZP) ===
Outline Zoning Plans are the standard zoning maps adopted for different areas of the city. Land within these maps is divided into different zones denoting different land uses, like Residential, Commercial, or Industrial. A zoning like "Residential" can be broken down into different subtypes, to accommodate different types or intensity of residential development. The function of each zone is to specify which land uses may be permitted on the site. Some zones prohibit development in order to provide open space, or to conserve environmental features and heritage assets.

Each zone is accompanied by a set of "notes". The main feature of the notes is a table is drawn up with two columns. "Column 1" will specify land uses which are always permitted in that particular type of zone, while "Column 2" lists uses which might be permitted in that zone upon application and approval from the Town Planning Board. The notes can also include a set of "remarks" elucidating any additional restrictions, i.e. the maximum plot ratio or building height permitted.

=== Development Permission Area (DPA) ===
A Development Permission Area (DPA) plan is a provisional type of plan drawn up, mainly in rural areas, as a temporary measure before a formal OZP is adopted there. They normally expire after three years, and the TPB must prepare an OZP in advance of that date.

=== Comprehensive Development Area (CDA) ===
Comprehensive Development Area (CDA) is a special type of zone introduced to simplify the process of developing large-scale projects. Under this zoning, no uses are permitted as-of-right. In other words, there are no "Column 1" permitted uses as other typical land use zones. Instead, the applicant prepares a master layout plan and submits it for consideration by the Town Planning Board, who can approve or reject it.

CDA zoning is used for large sites, like obsolete government properties, sites on railway property, or when numerous older properties are slated for urban renewal. Often such projects are proposed by large real estate conglomerates (like Cheung Kong or Sun Hung Kai) who have the capital to bid on such huge sites, the MTR Corporation, or the Urban Renewal Authority.

CDA zoning is based upon the premise that comprehensive development is necessarily better than piecemeal redevelopment. This precept has been called into question as the scale of CDA development has resulted in some examples of poor urban design, for example: poor relationship to urban context, closure of established streets and the transference of the public realm into insular, privately owned shopping centres.

== See also ==
- Lands Department
- Urban Renewal Authority
- Planning and zoning commission
