= Southern District Council =

District council in Hong Kong

Coordinates: 22.2474°N 114.1590°E

Southern District Council 南區區議會

Type
- Type: Hong Kong District Council of the Southern District, Hong Kong

History
- Founded: 4 December 1981 (District Board); 1 July 1997 (Provisional); 1 January 2000 (District Council)

Leadership
- Chair: Francis Cheng Kong-chung, Independent

Structure
- Seats: 20 councillors consisting of 4 elected members 8 district committee members 8 appointed members
- DAB: 7 / 20
- FTU: 2 / 20
- NPP: 2 / 20
- BPA: 2 / 20
- Liberal: 1 / 20
- Independent: 6 / 20

Elections
- Voting system: First past the post
- Last election: 10 December 2023

Meeting place
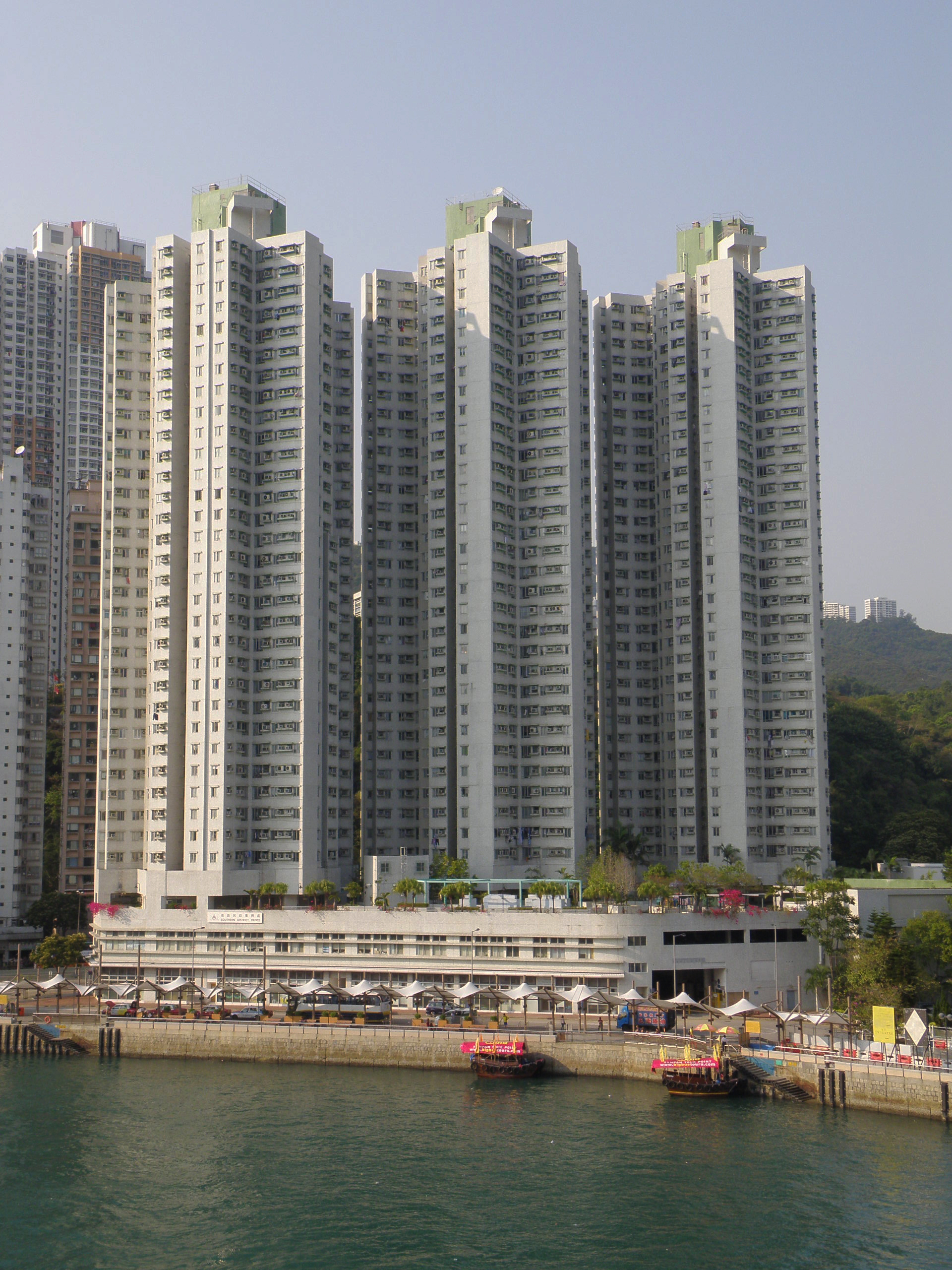
- 1/F., Ocean Court, 3 Aberdeen Praya Road, Aberdeen, Hong Kong

Website
- www.districtcouncils.gov.hk/south/

Southern District Council
- Traditional Chinese: 南區區議會
Transcriptions
Yue: Cantonese
- Yale Romanization: Nàahm kēui kēui yih wuih
- Jyutping: Naam4 koei1 keoi1 ji6 wui6

The Southern District Council (noted as South) is the district council for the Southern District in Hong Kong. It is one of 18 such councils. The Southern District Council currently consists of 20 members, of which the district is divided into two constituencies, electing a total of 4 members, 8 district committee members, and 8 appointed members. The last election was held on 24 November 2019.

== History ==
The Southern District Council was established on 4 December 1981 under the name of the Southern District Board as the result of the colonial Governor Murray MacLehose's District Administration Scheme reform. The District Board was partly elected with the ex-officio Urban Council members, as well as members appointed by the Governor until 1994 when last Governor Chris Patten refrained from appointing any member.

The Southern District Board became Southern Provisional District Board after the Hong Kong Special Administrative Region (HKSAR) was established in 1997 with the appointment system being reintroduced by Chief Executive Tung Chee-hwa. The Southern District Council was established on 1 January 2000 after the first District Council election in 1999. The council has become fully elected when the appointed seats were abolished in 2011 after the modified constitutional reform proposal was passed by the Legislative Council in 2010.

The Southern District Council has been dominated by the conservative independents. It was once the stronghold of the traditional political group Hong Kong Civic Association in the 1980s, in which they received a great victory in the 1985 election and elected its member Lam Kwok-kwong as the board chairman. The Hong Kong Civic Association allied with the conservative Liberal Democratic Federation of Hong Kong (LDF) in the 1991 election, while the liberal United Democrats of Hong Kong (UDHK) also established its presence in the district concentrated in Wah Fu Estate, led by Huang Chen-ya who was later elected to the Legislative Council in the same year.

The Southern District Council has been controlled by the pro-Beijing camp since 1997, even though the Democratic Party maintained their presence in Wah Fu and some other constituencies. It also bred its young party members Lo Kin-hei and Au Nok-hin who both took the Lei Tung constituencies away from long-held conservative independent councillors in the 2011 election. In the 2019 elections, the pro-democrats achieved the majority in the council in a historic landslide victory brought by the pro-democracy protests. Kelvin Lam Ho-por, a substitute for Joshua Wong who was disqualified from running, defeated Judy Chan Ka-pui of the New People's Party in South Horizons West.

== Political control ==
Since 1982 political control of the council has been held by the following parties:

Camp in control	Largest party	Years	Composition
No Overall Control	Civic Association	1982 - 1985	
Pro-government	Civic Association	1985 - 1988	
Pro-government	Civic Association	1988 - 1991	
Pro-government	Civic Association	1991 - 1994	
Pro-Beijing	Democratic	1994 - 1997	
Pro-Beijing	Democratic	1997 - 1999	
Pro-Beijing	Democratic	2000 - 2003	
Pro-Beijing	Democratic	2004 - 2007	
Pro-Beijing	Democratic	2008 - 2011	
Pro-Beijing	Democratic	2012 - 2015	
Pro-Beijing	Democratic	2016 - 2019	
Pro-democracy → Pro-Beijing	Democratic → Liberal	2020 - 2023	
Pro-Beijing	DAB	2024 - 2027	

== Political makeup ==

Elections are held every four years.

Political party	Council members							Current members
Political party	1994	1999	2003	2007	2011	2015	2019	Current members
Independent	10	11	10	11	8	9	8	7 / 17
Democratic	4	2	2	3	5	4	7	7 / 17
Civic	-	-	-	0	1	0	1	1 / 17
Liberal	2	2	2	1	1	1	1	1 / 17

== District result maps ==
1994

1999

2003

2007

2011

2015

2019

== Members represented ==
Capacity	Code	Constituency	Name	Political affiliation	Term		Notes
Elected	D01	Southern District Southeast	Chan Wing-yan	FTU	1 January 2024	Incumbent	
Elected	D01	Southern District Southeast	Jonathan Leung Chun	Liberal	1 January 2024	Incumbent	
Elected	D02	Southern District Northwest	Cheung Wai-nam	DAB	1 January 2024	Incumbent	
Elected	D02	Southern District Northwest	Sophia Lam Wing-yan	FTU	1 January 2024	Incumbent	
District Committees			Sunny Wong Choi-lap	DAB	1 January 2024	Incumbent	
District Committees			Victor Lau Ngai	DAB	1 January 2024	Incumbent	
District Committees			Danny Siu Wai-chung	DAB	1 January 2024	Incumbent	
District Committees			Nicole Wong Yu-ching	NPP	1 January 2024	Incumbent	
District Committees			Adam Lai Ka-chi	BPA	1 January 2024	Incumbent	
District Committees			Howard Chao	BPA	1 January 2024	Incumbent	
District Committees			Lam Wing-yee	Independent	1 January 2024	Incumbent	
District Committees			Cheung Chin-chung	Independent	1 January 2024	Incumbent	
Appointed			Roy Chu Lap-wai	DAB	1 January 2024	Incumbent	
Appointed			Li Kai-ying	DAB	1 January 2024	Incumbent	
Appointed			Chan Yuk-kit	DAB	1 January 2024	Incumbent	
Appointed			Vera Ho Yuen-wei	NPP	1 January 2024	Incumbent	
Appointed			Lam Yuk-chun	Independent	1 January 2024	Incumbent	
Appointed			Chan Man-chun	Independent	1 January 2024	Incumbent	
Appointed			Pang Siu-kei	Independent	1 January 2024	Incumbent	
Appointed			Jun Yeung Sheung-chun	Independent	1 January 2024	Incumbent	

== Leadership ==
=== Chairs ===
Since 1985, the chairman is elected by all the members of the board:

Chairman	Years	Political Affiliation
Kwong Ki-chi	1981–1984	District Officer
Eddy Chan Yuk-tak	1984–1985	District Officer
Lam Kwok-kwong	1985–1988	Civic Association
Hui Yung-chung	1988–1994	Independent
Ko Tam-kan	1994–1997	Independent
Ma Yuet-har	1997–1999	Independent
Joseph Chan Yuek-sut	2000–2003	Independent
Ma Yuet-har	2004–2011	Independent
Chu Ching-hong	2012–2019	Independent
Lo Kin-hei	2020–2021	Democratic
Francis Cheng Kwok-chung	2024–present	District Officer

=== Vice Chairs ===
Vice Chairman	Years	Political Affiliation
Wong King-keung	2000–2003	Independent
Chu Ching-hong	2004–2011	Independent
Chan Fu-ming	2012–2019	Independent
Paulus Johannes Zimmerman	2020–2023	Independent
