= South Horizons West (constituency) =

Hong Kong constituency

- Elected constituency for the Southern District Council
- Boundary of South Horizons West in Southern District
- District: Southern
- Legislative Council constituency: Hong Kong Island West
- Population: 14,674 (2019)
- Electorate: 9,325 (2019)

Current constituency
- Created: 1999
- Number of members: One
- Member: Vacant
- Created from: South Horizons

South Horizons West is one of the 17 constituencies in the Southern District, Hong Kong. The constituency returns one district councillor to the Southern District Council, with an election every four years.

South Horizons East constituency is loosely based on the western part of the South Horizons in Ap Lei Chau with estimated population of 15,088.

== Councillors represented ==
Election	Member	Party
1999	So Bay-hung	Independent
2003	Law Kam-hung	Independent
2007	Andrew Fung Wai-kwong	Democratic
2012	Andrew Fung Wai-kwong	Independent
2014 by-election	Judy Kapui Chan	NPP
2019	Kelvin Lam Ho-por→Vacant (Note: Resigned on 9 July 2021.)	Independent democrat

== Election results ==
=== 2010s ===
Southern District Council Election, 2019: South Horizons West
Party	Candidate	Votes	%	±%
Ind. democrat	Kelvin Lam Ho-por	4,164	56.27	
NPP	Judy Kapui Chan	3,236	43.73	−12.97
Majority		928	12.54	
Turnout		7,442	79.84	
Ind. democrat gain from NPP		Swing		

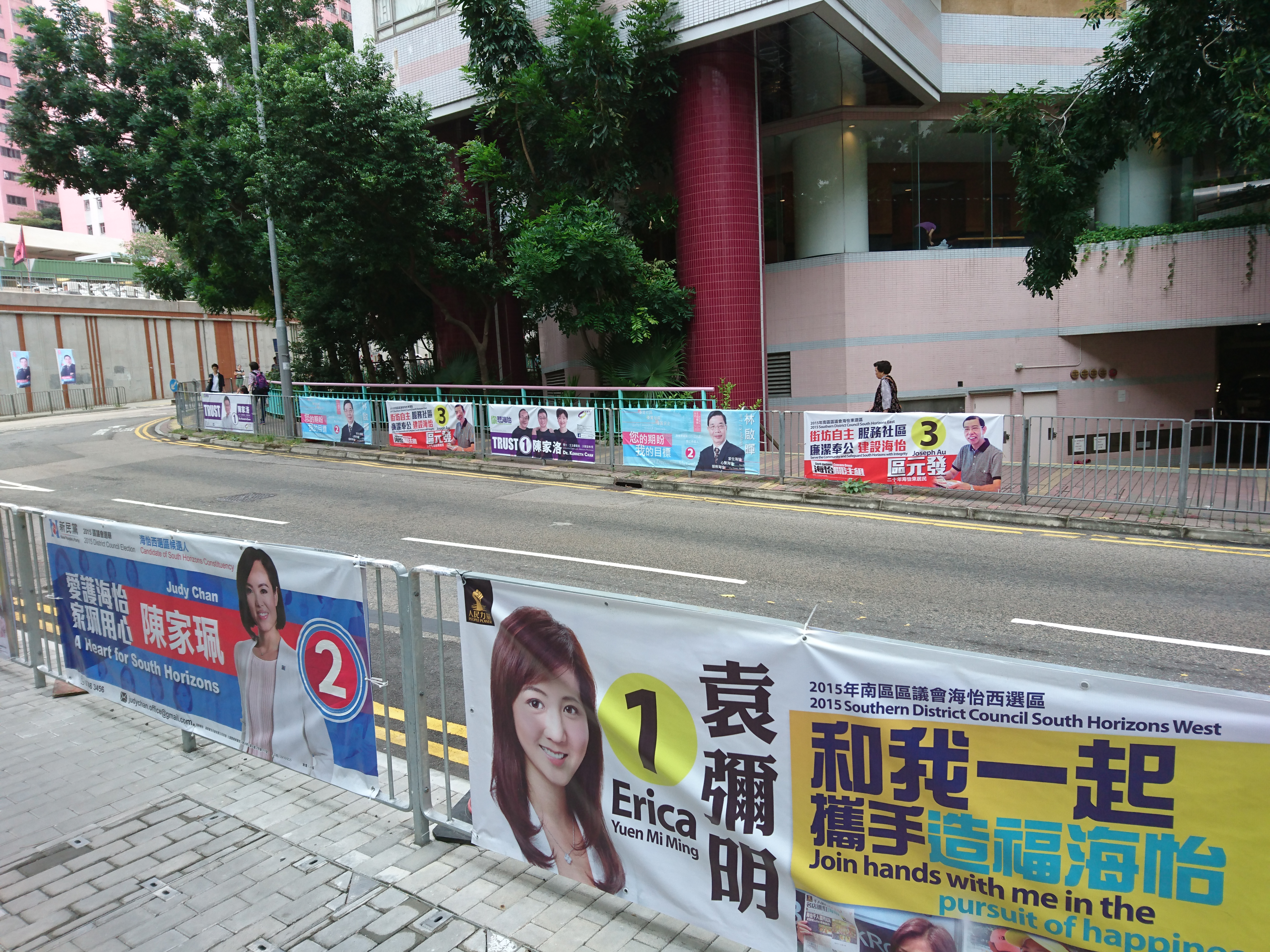
Election banners in the 2015 election.

Southern District Council Election, 2015: South Horizons West
Party	Candidate	Votes	%	±%
NPP	Judy Kapui Chan	2,945	56.7	+6.5
People Power	Erica Yuen Mi-ming	2,245	43.3	+16.4
Majority		700	13.4	–9.9
Turnout		5,277	63.9	+10.2
NPP hold		Swing	+11.5	

South Horizons West by-election, 2014
Party	Candidate	Votes	%	±%
NPP	Judy Kapui Chan	2,023	50.2	+3.1
People Power	Erica Yuen Mi-ming	1,083	26.9	+22.4
Democratic	Sin Chung-kai	920	22.9	−24.5
Majority		940	23.3	+20.0
Turnout		4,059	53.7	
NPP gain from Independent		Swing		

Southern District Council Election, 2011: South Horizons West
Party	Candidate	Votes	%	±%
Democratic	Andrew Fung Wai-kwong	1,906	47.4	−4.8
NPP	Sze Chun-fai	1,894	47.1	N/A
People Power (Power Voters)	Anthony Lam Yue-yeung	182	4.5	N/A
Independent	Kwai Sze-kit	42	1.0	N/A
Majority		12	0.3	−10.1
Democratic hold		Swing		

=== 2000s ===
Southern District Council Election, 2007: South Horizons West
Party	Candidate	Votes	%	±%
Democratic	Andrew Fung Wai-kwong	1,747	55.2	
Independent	Law Kam-hung	1,419	44.8	
Majority		328	10.4	
Democratic gain from Independent		Swing		

Southern District Council Election, 2003: South Horizons West
Party	Candidate	Votes	%	±%
Independent	Law Kam-hung	1,172	42.9	
Independent	Ganni Mok Chung-ping	1,120	40.9	
Independent	Warren Man Siu-hung	442	16.2	
Majority		52	2.0	
Independent hold		Swing		

=== 1990s ===
Southern District Council Election, 1999: South Horizons West
Party	Candidate	Votes	%	±%
Independent	So Bay-hung	uncontested		
Independent win (new seat)				
