= Judy Chan =

Hong Kong politician

The Honourable Judy Chan Kapui MH, JP
- 陳家珮
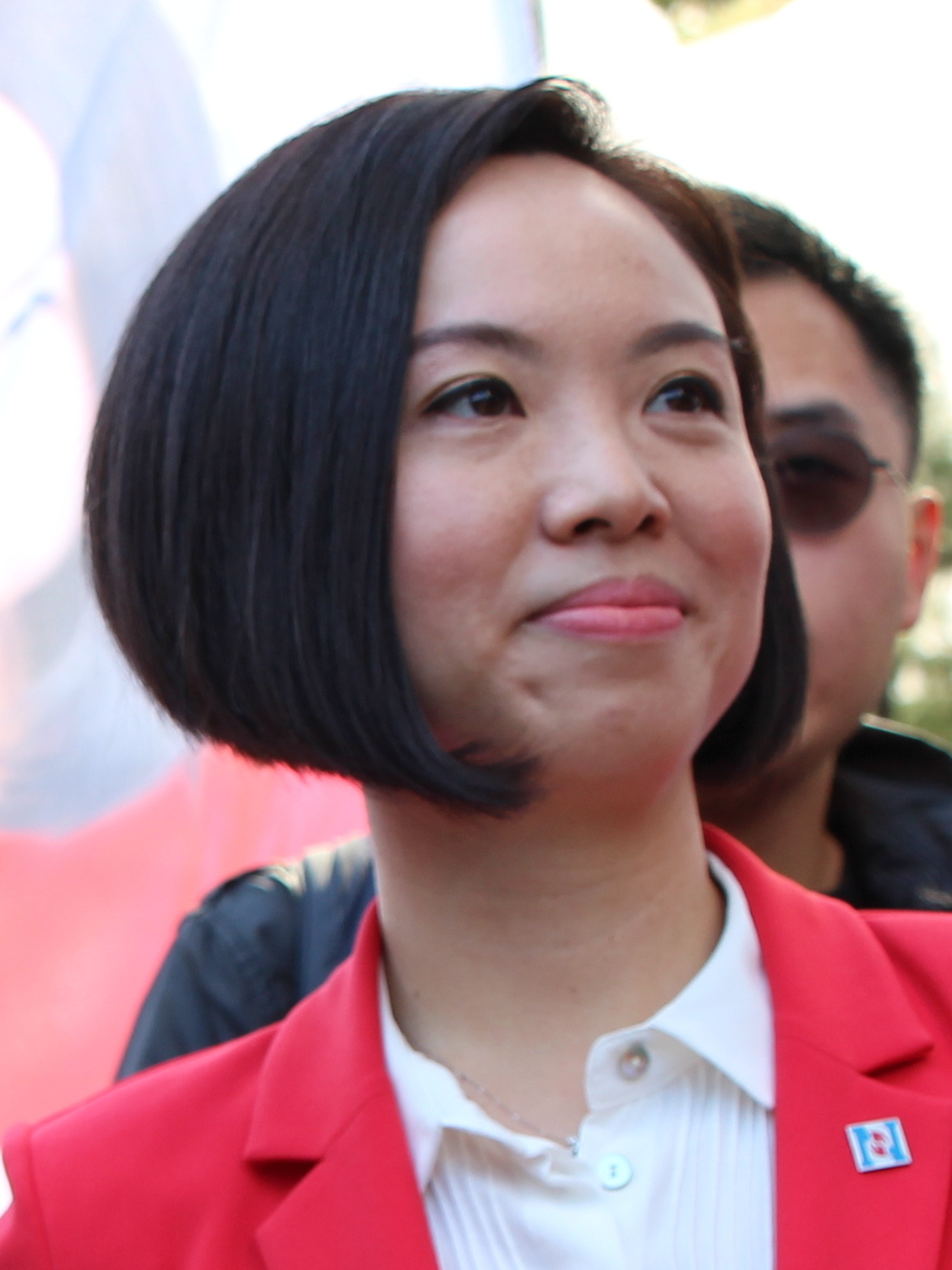
- Chan in 2018

Member of the Legislative Council
- Incumbent
- Assumed office 1 January 2026
- Preceded by: Regina Ip
- Constituency: Hong Kong Island West
- In office 1 January 2022 – 31 December 2025
- Preceded by: New constituency
- Constituency: Election Committee

Personal details
- Born: 4 April 1980 (age 46) Hong Kong
- Party: New People's Party
- Occupation: Legislative Councillor

Judy Chan Kapui (Chinese: 陳家珮; born 4 April 1980) is a Hong Kong politician who is a current member of the Legislative Council of Hong Kong elected through the Election Committee and re-elected through Hong Kong Island West in the 2025 Legislative Elections. She is a member of the New People's Party and was a former member of Southern District Council for South Horizons West, until 2019.

== Biography ==
The daughter of an antique store owner, Chan lived on the Peak, one of Hong Kong's most affluent locations, and graduated from Monash University. She says that she worked in the United States for seven years before relocating to Hong Kong. She was a founding member of the New People's Party (NPP) and became known when she won the 2014 Southern District Council by-election in South Horizons West, defeating two pro-democracy heavyweights, the Democratic Party's former Legislative Councillor Sin Chung-kai and People Power chairwoman Erica Yuen.

She then became seen as a future successor to NPP chairwoman Regina Ip. She stood unsuccessfully in the 2016 Legislative Council election in Hong Kong Island on a ticket, behind Ip, that received more than 60,000 votes, the highest in the poll. She had relinquished her United States citizenship to stand in the election.

In the 2018 Hong Kong Island by-election triggered by the oath-taking controversy which resulted in the disqualification of Demosisto's Nathan Law, Chan became the pro-Beijing representative to run against Au Nok-hin. Despite earning more than 120,000 votes, she lost to Au with a narrow margin of 3.5 per cent.

On 5 January 2022, Carrie Lam announced new warnings and restrictions against social gathering due to potential COVID-19 outbreaks. One day later, it was discovered that Chan attended a birthday party hosted by Witman Hung Wai-man, with 222 guests. At least one guest tested positive with COVID-19, causing all guests to be quarantined. Chan was warned by Legislative Council president Andrew Leung to not attend any meetings until after finishing her last mandatory Covid-19 test on 22 January 2022. However, she decided to attend the meeting on 19 January 2022, against Leung's orders. About the party, Chan said "It was held shortly after an intense Legislative Council election, and the same day as our oath-taking ceremony, so we just went there to chill and celebrate".

In September 2022, Chan tested positive for COVID-19.

In 2022, one of the first motions passed in the Legislative Council came from Chan, who urged a crackdown on foreign domestic helpers who were "job hopping" or leaving their employers early.

In December 2025, she was re-elected as Legislative Councilor through Hong Kong Island West constituency.

In March 2026, Chan was fined HK$2,000 and disqualified from driving for one month for driving along a road in the wrong direction, after a video of the incident went viral two months earlier. She penitently said that she would not drive 'for the time being'.

Political offices
Preceded by Andrew Fung	Member of the Southern District Council; Representative for South Horizons West; 2014–2019	Succeeded by Kelvin Lam Ho-por
Legislative Council of Hong Kong
Preceded by Constituency created	Member of the Legislative Council; Representative for Election Committee; 2022–present	Succeeded by present
