= Elections in Hong Kong =

Elections in Hong Kong take place when certain political offices in the government need to be filled. Hong Kong has a multi-party system, with numerous parties in the Legislative Council. The Chief Executive of Hong Kong is nonpartisan.

Every four years, ninety representatives are chosen to sit on the unicameral Legislative Council of Hong Kong (LegCo). Twenty seats representing the geographical constituencies are returned by popular vote, thirty seats representing the functional constituencies are elected through smaller closed elections within business sectors, and the remaining forty seats representing the Election Committee constituency are chosen by members of the Election Committee. The Chief Executive of Hong Kong is returned by the 1,500-member Election Committee on five-year intervals. Local elections are held on four-year intervals to return members of District Councils.

Following the 2019–2020 Hong Kong protests, and the landslide victory of Hong Kong's pro-democracy camp in the 2019 Hong Kong local elections, the Standing Committee of the National People's Congress of the People's Republic of China passed the Hong Kong national security law and changes to Annex I and Annex II of the Hong Kong Basic Law. Candidates are subject to an official eligibility review mechanism, curtailing the influence of the public's vote on the outcome of elections.

== History ==
Elections for unofficial members of the Urban Council were held beginning 1888. Suffrage was restricted to residents on the special and common jury lists between 1888 and 1973. In 1973, the electoral franchise for the Urban Council was widened to residents above 21 years of age who have lived in Hong Kong for at least three years that qualified in at least one of 23 specified categories, which included educational qualifications (School Certificate Examination or equivalent), being a juror, salaried taxpayer, or a member of certain professional organisations as listed in Schedule 1 of the Urban Council Ordinance (Cap. 101, Laws of Hong Kong). Half of the members of the Urban Council were elected, but by a minority of the population. It was estimated that in 1970 there were 250,000 eligible voters and in 1981 the number had increased to 400,000 – 500,000. Prominent elected Urban Councillors included Elsie Tu and Brook Bernacchi of the Reform Club.

=== Expansion of elected offices ===
The Green Paper: A Pattern of District Administration in Hong Kong was published on 6 June 1980 for public consultations on reforming local administration in Hong Kong. The Green Paper recommended that elections by popular vote be introduced to return some members of the newly established District Boards and unofficial members of the Urban Council. The White Paper: District Administration in Hong Kong of January 1981 further cemented the government's will to introduce elections by popular vote. Proposals in the White Paper were implemented between 1982 and 1983, during which elections to the District Boards and Urban Council were held.

Months before the Sino-British Joint Declaration was signed which the United Kingdom and the People's Republic of China governments agreed on handing over Hong Kong from British to Chinese rule in 1997, the Green Paper: the Further Development of Representative Government in Hong Kong was published in July 1984. The Green Paper cemented first large-scale constitutional reform in developing a representative government during the British rule. The Green Paper suggested the introduction of indirect election in two stages in 1985 and 1988 to the unofficial members of the Legislative Council of Hong Kong (LegCo) by an electoral college consisting of Members of the Urban Council of Hong Kong, the new Regional Council to be established in 1986, and District Boards and functional groups or functional constituencies. The first Legislative Council elections, electing 24 unofficial members of LegCo, was held in September 1985.

=== Popular elections to the legislature ===
Consultations on electoral reform followed the 1985 electoral reform. In the White Paper: the Further Development of Representative Government in Hong Kong of 1984, the idea of direct election was suggested to be reviewed in the development of representative government in 1987.

In May 1987, the government published the 1987 Green Paper: Review of Developments in Representative Government to consider the next stage of development of representative government. Despite strong public opinion in the consultations supporting the introduction of direct elections, the Government concluded that no clear consensus on the timing or the extent of the introduction of direct elections emerged. The subsequent White Paper: the Development of Representative Government: The Way Forward delayed the first direct elections to the Legislative Council from 1988 to the 1991 elections. A total of 18 members were returned from geographical constituencies by popular vote, out of a total of 60 LegCo members.

As Chris Patten succeeded David Wilson to become the last Governor of Hong Kong, extensive electoral reform proposals were announced in Patten's inaugural Policy Address. The minimum voting age was lowered from 21 to 18, and all appointed seats on the Urban Council, Regional Council and District Boards were to be abolished by 1995. Single-member constituencies were to be introduced to geographical constituencies of the Legislative Council, elected seats of the Urban Council, elected seats of the Regional Council and elected seats of District Boards.

Patten significantly broadened the electoral franchise to the first fully-elected Legislative Council returned in 1995, the composition of which conformed with Basic Law provisions on the composition of the 1st Legislative Council of Hong Kong SAR. Patten lobbied the Legislative Council (Electoral Provisions) (Amendment) Bill 1994 which broadened the franchise of certain existing functional constituencies by replacing corporate voting with individual voting. Nine new functional constituency seats were established, allowing about 2.7 million people to have the right to vote in functional constituencies. An Election Committee composed of district board members returned ten members to the Legislative Council.

In response to Patten's reforms, Beijing cancelled the "through-train arrangement" which would have allowed the last Legislative Council in the colonial era to be sworn in as the 1st Legislative Council of Hong Kong SAR after the transfer of sovereignty to China in 1997. The Preparatory Committee for the Hong Kong SAR under Chinese National People's Congress established the Provisional Legislative Council on 26 January 1996 that served as Hong Kong's interim legislature until July 1998.

=== Post-handover development ===
The Provisional Legislative Council (PLC) installed by the Beijing government during the intense Sino-British confrontation over the democratic reform decided on the electoral system of the post-handover Legislative Council. For geographical constituencies, proportional representation using the largest remainder method with Hare quota was adopted by the SAR government in replacement of the first-past-the-post system introduced in 1995. The system was designed to reward the weaker pro-Beijing candidates and dilute the electoral strength of the majority democrats. For functional constituencies, corporate voting was restored after it was abolished in 1995. It reduced the number of eligible voters by almost 90 per cent, from over 1.1 million in 1995 to fewer than 140,000 in 1998. The elected Urban Council and Regional Council were also abolished by Tung Chee-hwa's government.

The first legislative election in the HKSAR was held in 1998, with 20 members returned by geographical constituencies through direct elections, 10 members returned by the 800-member Election Committee and 30 members returned by functional constituencies (FC). The number of LegCo members returned from geographical constituencies (GC) increased from 20 to 24 in 2000 and to 30 in 2004, constituting half of the legislature. Seats returned by Election Committee were abolished by 2004.

The first Chief Executive election after the transfer of sovereignty was held in 2002. Incumbent Tung Chee-hwa was elected uncontested. Subsequent Chief Executives were returned by the Election Committee, members of which were elected by members of specified associations or professions.

=== Demand for universal suffrage ===
Before the 2021 Hong Kong electoral changes, the Hong Kong Special Administrative Region had the power to initiate amendments of Annexes I and II of the Basic Law to change its electoral system. From late 2003 on, the Government and the public had been drawing out plans of democratisation to realise the ultimate aim of electing a chief executive by universal suffrage after nomination by an ad hoc committee (Basic Law, Art. 45) and electing the whole Legislative Council by universal suffrage (Basic Law, Art. 68). On 6 April 2004, the Standing Committee of the National People's Congress (NPCSC) issued its second interpretation on the Basic Law, indicating that electoral reforms are possible in 2007 and stipulating the “five steps” of initiating political reform under Annex I of the Basic Law. On 26 April 2004, the NPCSC further passed a decision that negated universal suffrage for CE elections in 2007 and LegCo elections in 2008, but provided for electoral reforms withstanding a 50:50 ratio between GC and FC seats. The Legislative Council vetoed the Motions put by the HKSAR Government to the LegCo concerning amendment to the methods for selecting the CE in 2007 and for forming LegCo.

In late 2007, the Standing Committee of the National People's Congress (NPCSC) decided that the universal suffrage for the Chief Executive can be achieved in 2017 or later, and universal suffrage for the Legislative Council can be achieved after the former has been. The NPCSC decision also provided for electoral reforms in 2012 withstanding a 50:50 ratio between GC and FC seats. The Legislative Council approved of the Motions concerning the amendment to the methods for selecting the CE and for forming LegCo in 2012.

Amidst the 2014–2015 Hong Kong electoral reform on universal suffrage in 2017, the NPCSC has outlined a screening mechanism of Chief Executive candidates, in which Chief Executive candidates must first receive nominations by an absolute majority of a Nominating Committee before proceeding to popular vote. The Hong Kong Government's bill for universal suffrage in Chief Executive elections was subsequently rejected.

With the NPCSC's amendment of Annexes I and II of the Basic Law in 2021, the NPCSC has retracted the power of the HKSAR to initiate political reform. The Chinese NPCSC now exercises the sole power to amend Annexes I and II of the Basic Law. In lieu of recent efforts by China to hamper the pro-democracy camp, universal suffrage remains unlikely in the foreseeable future.

The evolution of elected offices in Hong Kong returned by popular vote is as follows:

Constituencies returned by popular vote
	1982/83	1985/86	1988/89	1991	1994/95	1998	1999/00	2003/04	2007/08	2011/12	2015/16	2019/21	2021/23
Legislative Council	—N/a			Geographical; Constituencies									
Legislative Council	—N/a									District Council (Second) FC		—N/a	
Urban Council and Regional Council	Elected seats of Municipal Councils					—N/a							
District Councils	Elected seats of District Boards					—N/a	Elected seats of District Councils						Elected seats of District Councils Ordinary Election

Number and proportion (%) of seats returned by popular vote
	1982/83	1985/86	1988/89	1991	1994/95	1998	1999/00	2003/04	2007/08	2011/12	2015/16	2019/21	2021/23
Legislative Council	—N/a			18 (29.5%)	20 (33.3%)		24 (40%)	30 (50%)		40 (57.1%)		20 (22.2%)	20 (22.2%)
Urban Council and Regional Council	15 (50%)	27 (40.9%)	27 (35.5%)		59 (73.8%)	—N/a							
District Councils	132 (26.9%)	237 (55.6%)	264 (57.1%)	274 (62.1%)	346 (92.8%)	—N/a	390 (75.1%)	400 (77.1%)	405 (75.8%)	412 (81.3%)	431 (94.1%)	452 (95.4%)	88 (18.7%)

Electoral methods of seats returned by popular vote
	1982/83	1985/86	1988/89	1991	1994/95	1998	1999/00	2003/04	2007/08	2011/12	2015/16	2019/21
Legislative Council	—N/a			MNTV	FPTP	Proportional representation (Largest remainder method: Hare quota)						SNTV
Urban Council and Regional Council	First-past-the-post voting					—N/a						
District Councils	First-past-the-post voting & Plurality block voting				FPTP	—N/a	First-past-the-post voting					

== Voter registration and nomination ==
Any Hong Kong permanent resident aged 18 or above may register as an elector in the geographical constituency in which they reside, except those mentally incapacitated and those serving in an armed force. Persons serving a sentence of imprisonment used to be barred from registering and voting, but a 2008 judgment by the Court of First Instance of the High Court ruled that a blanket bar was unconstitutional and that the Government had a year to change the offending provisions. The Government did not appeal the judgment, and held consultations with the public on how the law should be changed. A bill was then introduced to the LegCo, providing that no person would be barred from electoral registration or voting because of criminal conviction, even for crimes against the electoral system. It became law and entered into force on 30 October 2009.

Hong Kong permanent residents must satisfy all the following requirements to be eligible for registration as electors in a geographical constituency:

- permanent resident of Hong Kong;
- aged 18 years or above as at 25 July next following his application for registration (or 25 September in a District Council election year)
- ordinarily resident in Hong Kong, and the residential address in his application for registration is his only or principal residence in Hong Kong;
- holds a Hong Kong identity document or has applied for a new identity card; and
- not disqualified by application of s.31 of the Legislative Council Ordinance (Cap 542).

Electors can run for elections if they have reached 21 years of age and have ordinary resided in Hong Kong for the 3 years immediately preceding the nomination. In addition, candidates running for the Chief Executive and the Legislative Council, except 12 specified functional constituencies have to be a Chinese citizen with no right of abode in any country other than the People's Republic of China.

=== Candidate eligibility review ===
Under the 2021 Hong Kong electoral changes initiated by the National People's Congress, nominees for elections are screened so as to ensure the "administration of Hong Kong by Hong Kong people with patriots as the main body". A Candidate Eligibility Review mechanism is established to review and confirm of eligibility of candidates for the Election Committee, Chief Executive and Legislative Council elections:

- Review by the department for safeguarding national security of the Hong Kong Police Force on whether a candidate meets the legal requirements and conditions of upholding the Basic Law and swearing allegiance to HKSAR of PRC;
- the Committee for Safeguarding National Security of the HKSAR issues opinion in respect of a candidate who fails to meet such legal requirements and conditions on the basis of the police review; and
- Review and Confirmation of eligibility of candidates by the Candidate Eligibility Review Committee of the HKSAR.

In practice, every candidate approved to run for election to the Legislative Council is either a member of the pro-Beijing camp or has otherwise been deemed "patriotic" enough by the government of China to participate. Since the 2021 reforms, numerous pro-democracy activists who had attempted to run in elections were arrested.

== Chief Executive elections ==
The Election Committee is responsible for nomination of Chief Executive candidates and election of the Chief Executive-elect. Under the 2021 Hong Kong electoral changes initiated by the National People's Congress, each candidate running for Chief Executive elections is to be nominated by at least 188 members of the Election Committee, before their eligibility is reviewed and confirmed by the Candidate Eligibility Review Committee of the HKSAR according to opinions issued by the Committee for Safeguarding National Security of the Hong Kong Special Administrative Region. The Chief Executive-designate is then returned by the Election Committee with an absolute majority.

=== Election Committee ===
The specific method for selecting the Chief Executive is prescribed in Annex I of the Basic Law. The Election Committee shall be composed of 1500 members from the following sectors pursuant to the amended Annex I under the 2021 Hong Kong electoral changes initiated by the National People's Congress from the following sectors pursuant to the amended Annex I under the 2021 Hong Kong electoral changes initiated by the National People's Congress. The Election Committee consists of individuals (i.e. private citizens) and representatives of bodies (i.e. special interest groups or corporate bodies) selected or elected by 40 prescribed sub-sectors as stipulated in Annex I to the Basic Law:

Sector	Members
Industrial, commercial and financial sectors	300
The professions	300
Grassroots, labour, religious and other sectors	300
Members of the Legislative Council, representatives of district organisations and other organisations	300
HKSAR deputies to the National People's Congress, the National Committee of the Chinese People's Political Consultative Conference, and representatives of Hong Kong members of relevant national organisations	300
Total	1,500

The Election Committee is now principally elected by body votes. The number of subsectors with individual votes were significantly reduced, together with elimination of mixed individual and body voting:

- Half of seats (150 seats) in Sector III are nominated by members of national professional organisations or filled by ex officio members;
- District Council subsectors were replaced by subsectors consisting of appointed representatives of members of Area Committees, District Fight Crime Committees, and District Fire Safety Committees;
- All NPC and CPPCC sectors serve as ex officio EC members; and
- subsectors consisting of grassroot organisations, associations of Chinese Fellow Townsmen, associations of Hong Kong residents in Mainland and Hong Kong members of relevant national organisations were introduced.

=== Electoral system ===
Chief Executive candidates must receive nominations by at least 188 members of the Election Committee, with Nomination by at least 15 members of each sector of the Election Committee. Candidacy is confirmed upon review and confirmation of eligibility by the Candidate Qualification Review Committee, according to opinions issued by the Committee for Safeguarding National Security of the Hong Kong Special Administrative Region on the basis of a review by the National Security Department of the Hong Kong Police Force on whether a candidate meets the legal requirements and conditions of upholding the Basic Law and swearing allegiance to the HKSAR of the People's Republic of China.

The Chief Executive-designate is then returned by the Election Committee with an absolute majority in a two-round system:

Uncontested election	Contested election	
Election Committee casts votes of support/not support; the Chief Executive-designate is to be returned with an absolutely majority (>750 valid votes)	Election Committee casts votes for 1 of the candidates; the Chief Executive-designate is to be returned with an absolute majority (>750 valid votes)	
Election Committee casts votes of support/not support; the Chief Executive-designate is to be returned with an absolutely majority (>750 valid votes)	If absolute majority won	If absolute majority not won
Election Committee casts votes of support/not support; the Chief Executive-designate is to be returned with an absolutely majority (>750 valid votes)	Candidate with an absolutely majority of valid votes elected	If: 1. >= 2 candidates obtain the highest and the same no. of votes; or 2. no candidates win an absolute majority; Then: elimination of candidates other than those who obtained the highest number of votes in (1) or candidates with the highest and second highest number of votes in (2); second round(s) of voting conducted, until a candidate with an absolutely majority (>750 valid votes) is elected

The Chief Executive-designate must publicly disaffiliate with a political party within seven days of the election and must not become a member of a party during their term of office. The Chief Executive-designate is then appointed by the Central People's Government before taking office.

=== Article 45 ===
Article 45 gives the requirements for choosing the Chief Executive, and Annex I does likewise in a more specific manner.

"The Chief Executive of the Hong Kong Special Administrative Region shall be selected by election or through consultations held locally and be appointed by the Central People's Government."

"The method for selecting the Chief Executive shall be specified in the light of the actual situation in the Hong Kong Special Administrative Region and in accordance with the principle of gradual and orderly progress. The ultimate aim is the selection of the Chief Executive by universal suffrage upon nomination by a broadly representative nominating committee in accordance with democratic procedures."

=== Article 46 ===
According to Article 46 of the Hong Kong Basic Law, elections for the Chief Executive are held every five years. A 1,500-member electoral college called the Election Committee is elected by representations of specified associations, and some other sectors of the society, with each of the forty sectors of the society and interests of the Central Authorities receiving a set number of electoral votes. The eligible voters in each sector vote directly for the electors, who in turn cast ballots for Chief Executive.

Pursuant to the Annex II of the Basic Law, the Election Committee also selected 10 Members of the 1st LegCo by block vote in 1998. Four of the seats were reassigned to geographical constituencies for the 2nd LegCo in 2000, and the remainder for the 3rd LegCo in 2004. As a part of the 2021 amendments to Annex II by the Standing Committee of the National People's Congress, the Election Committee selects 40 members of the LegCo since 2021.

The EC elections are quite irregular. They were held in 1998 and 2000, but none (except for the 2002 by-election) have been held since. The claim in Ann. 1, Sect. 2, of the Basic Law, saying that the Election Committee must be renewed at least once every five years.

Article 46 was a subject of controversy regarding the term of the newly elected Chief Executive. The article states:

"The term of office of the Chief Executive of the Hong Kong Special Administrative Region shall be five years. He or she may serve for not more than two consecutive terms."

The law requires a term of five years, but mainland officials have said the new leader filling-in can only serve until 2007. The matter was settled after a re-interpretation by the Standing Committee of the National People's Congress (NPCSC). Though this did damage the credibility and integrity of the one country, two systems formula.

A literal interpretation would mean Tsang has to serve until 2010, but this is not common sense behaviour in most other nations; one can only complete the term of a predecessor. The Chinese government has decided that the new leader would serve until Inauguration day in 2007.

=== History of electoral contests ===
The last uncontested election was held in 2002, and with the resignation of Tung Chee Hwa an election would have been called on 10 July, had the election been contested. A controversial decision by the National People's Congress stated that a resignation did not end a term, so that Donald Tsang would serve only until 2007, rather than 2010 had a term been deemed to begin with each resignation. This is in line with the practice on mainland China (see Hong Kong Basic Law Article 46). The 800-member Election Committee held a vote on a day specified by the sitting chief executive sometime during the six months of the year prior to the HKSAR's Inauguration Day, 1 July. An absolute majority of the votes (i.e. 401 votes) are required to be elected. If no candidate has a majority vote, the one with the lowest vote is eliminated for the next round until a candidate has a majority vote.

In 1996, Tung Chee Hwa was elected with eighty per cent of the electoral votes against two other candidates, Mr. Peter Woo (吳光正) and Sir Ti Liang Yang (楊鐵樑). In 12002, Tung was re-elected uncontested, as he had received 713 signatures of support in the Electoral Committee, and 100 are required for nomination.(Annex I, Section 4, Basic Law)

The 2005 provided a sense of déjà vu for many, as Donald Tsang cruised to victory with 674 nomination signatures out of a possible 796 (four seats were vacant).

The EC elections are quite irregular. They were held in 1998 and 2000, but none (except for the 2002 by-election) have been held since. The claim in Ann. 1, Sect. 2, of the Basic Law, saying that the Election Committee must be renewed at least once every five years, exposed an interesting flaw in the system that was averted when Tsang was the only candidate nominated.

The problem was that the timing is crucial for the new chief executive election after Tung Chee Hwa's resignation on 12 March 2005. Since electoral law states that an election must be held 120 days after the vacancy, an election would be held on the tenth of July. It was unclear as to the exact time period separating the election and the date of taking of office for this Election Committee. If the new EC convened prior to the chief executive election, it would be applied to select the next chief executive, but otherwise the old Election Committee dating from 2000 would have to complete the task (see 2005 Hong Kong Chief Executive election for more information on the topic). The second round produces a further dispute, if the term of the old EC ended after the first round of voting but before the second. It would be rather insensible to use different electors for the two rounds; the same one would probably have to be prescribed.

The compositions of electoral colleges returning Chief Executives are as follows:

	1996	2002 & 2005	2007	2012	2017	2022
Electoral; College	Selection; Committee	Election Committee				
Size of electorate	400	800		1,200		1,500

== Legislative elections ==
Under the 2021 Hong Kong electoral changes initiated by the National People's Congress, the Legislative Council is now composed of 90 members returned from 3 constituencies: the Election Committee Constituency, Functional Constituencies and Geographical Constituencies by popular vote.

In Hong Kong, legislative elections are held every four years in accordance with Article 69 of the Basic Law of HKSAR. The most recent election was held on 19 December 2021.

In recent 2025, a total of 161 candidates are vying for 90 seats in Hong Kong’s second Legislative Council election since Beijing’s 2021 overhaul, which ensured only “patriots” could run—changes authorities say protect stability but critics argue diminish democracy. The previous post-reform poll saw a record-low 30% turnout, prompting an extensive government push this year that includes citywide promotions, shopping discounts, thank-you cards redeemable for vouchers, free entry to pools and museums, neighbourhood carnivals, and a televised gala, complete with mascots and a theme song. Chief Secretary Eric Chan said the goal is to create a “happy and festive mood” and emphasise the election’s importance. The race also brings significant turnover, with about a quarter of incumbents stepping down amid reports that Beijing encouraged retirements—especially among older lawmakers such as 70-plus veteran Regina Ip.

=== Electoral system ===
Each candidate running for Legislative elections is to be nominated by 10–20 members of the Election Committee, before their eligibility is reviewed and confirmed by the Candidate Eligibility Review Committee of the HKSAR according to opinions issued by the Committee for Safeguarding National Security of the Hong Kong Special Administrative Region:

Composition of the Legislative Council (2022–)
	Number of Members	Returned by	Voting Method	Number of Voters (2021)
Election Committee; Constituency	40	Members of the Election Committee	Plurality block voting	1,448
Functional Constituencies	30	Members of specified associations or professions	First-past-the-post voting or Plurality block voting	210,675 (individual voters); 8,579 (body voters)
Geographical Constituencies	20	Popular vote	Single non-transferable vote with district size of 2	4,472,863

Composition and Proportion (%) of Elected Seats of the Legislative Council
	1985	1988	1991	1995	PLC	1998	2000	2004	2008	2012	2016	2021
Returned by the Selection Committee or Election Committee	—N/a				60 (100%)	10 (16.7%)	6 (10%)	—N/a				40 (44.4%)
Functional; Constituencies (Note: Excluding the District Council (Second) Functional Constituency, which was returned by popular vote; and the Urban Council, Regional Council and District Council (First) functional constituencies, which were returned by indirect elections.)	12 (21.1%)	14 (24.6%)	19 (31.1%)	28 (46.7%)	—N/a	28 (46.7%)	29 (48.3%)			29 (41.4%)		30 (33.3%)
Seats returned by indirect election (Note: 12 electoral colleges were established to return unofficial members of the Legislative Council in the 1985 and 1988 Legislative Council elections, composed of members of district boards and municipal councils. Between 1991 and 1998, 2 members were returned by the Urban Council and Regional Council functional constituencies. In the 1995 Legislative Council election, 10 seats were returned through an Election Committee composed of elected members of district boards. Between 2000 and 2016, 1 member was returned by District Council (First) Functional Constituency.)	12 (21.1%)		2 (3.3%)	12 (20%)	—N/a	2 (3.3%)	1 (1.7%)			1 (1.4%)		—N/a
Seats returned by popular vote (Note: Including Geographical Constituencies and the District Council (Second) Functional Constituency.)	—N/a		18 (29.5%)	20 (33.3%)	—N/a	20 (33.3%)	24 (40%)	30 (50%)		40 (57.1%)		20 (22.2%)

=== Geographical Constituencies ===
20 seats of the Legislative Council are returned by geographical constituencies (GC) through single non-transferable vote with a district magnitude of 2 ("binomial system"). The binomial system was instituted by the Standing Committee of the National People's Congress in its amendment to Annex 2 of the Basic Law on 30 March 2021.

Geographical constituency	Number of voters	Number of seats	Voting system
Hong Kong Island East	424,849	2	Single non-transferable vote
Hong Kong Island West	374,795	2	Single non-transferable vote
Kowloon East	475,223	2	Single non-transferable vote
Kowloon West	381,484	2	Single non-transferable vote
Kowloon Central	454,595	2	Single non-transferable vote
New Territories South East	472,751	2	Single non-transferable vote
New Territories North	431,604	2	Single non-transferable vote
New Territories North West	468,752	2	Single non-transferable vote
New Territories South West	510,558	2	Single non-transferable vote
New Territories North East	478,252	2	Single non-transferable vote

Geographical constituencies were first introduced in Hong Kong's first legislative election with direct elections in 1991. The electoral system and boundaries of GCs have since changed:

Election Year	Voting system	Number of constituencies	District magnitude	Total number of GC seats	Proportion of LegCo seats
1991	Plurality-at-large	9 constituencies	2 seats	18 seats	29.5%
1995	First-past-the-post voting	20 constituencies	1 seat	20 seats	33.3%
1998	Proportional representation (Largest remainder method: Hare quota)	5 constituencies	3–9 seats	20 seats	33.3%
2000	Proportional representation (Largest remainder method: Hare quota)	5 constituencies	3–9 seats	24 seats	40%
2004	Proportional representation (Largest remainder method: Hare quota)	5 constituencies	3–9 seats	30 seats	50%
2008	Proportional representation (Largest remainder method: Hare quota)	5 constituencies	3–9 seats	30 seats	50%
2012	Proportional representation (Largest remainder method: Hare quota)	5 constituencies	3–9 seats	35 seats	50%
2016	Proportional representation (Largest remainder method: Hare quota)	5 constituencies	3–9 seats	35 seats	50%
2021	Single non-transferable vote	10 constituencies	2 seats	20 seats	22.2%

=== Functional Constituencies ===
Under the 2021 Hong Kong electoral changes, 28 functional constituencies (FC) return 30 members. The Labour Functional Constituency returns three members by plurality block voting. The other FCs return one member each with first-past-the-post voting.

The 2021 electoral reform saw the dissolution of District Council (First) and District Council (Second) FCs. 3 existing FCs were reconstituted: the Information Technology FC reorganised as the Technology & Innovation FC; the Medical FC and Health Services FC combined to form the Medical and Health Services FC. 2 new FCs were established, namely the Commercial (Third) and the HKSAR Deputies to the National People's Congress, HKSAR Members of the National Committee of the Chinese People's Political Consultative Conference, and Representatives of Relevant National Organisations FCs. Functional constituencies are now principally elected by body votes; the number of FCs with individual votes were reduced, together with elimination of mixed individual and body voting systems.

Registered voters in the functional constituencies of Hong Kong in 2021
Functional constituency		Number of registered electors		
Functional constituency		Bodies	Individuals	Total
1	Heung Yee Kuk		161	161
2	Agriculture and Fisheries	176		176
3	Insurance	126		126
4	Transport	223		223
5	Education		85,117	85,117
6	Legal		7,549	7,549
7	Accountancy		27,778	27,778
8	Medical and Health Services		55,523	55,523
9	Engineering		10,772	10,772
10	Architectural, Surveying and Planning		9,123	9,123
11	Labour	697		697
12	Social Welfare		13,974	13,974
13	Real Estate and Construction	463		463
14	Tourism	192		192
15	Commercial (First)	1,041		1,041
16	Commercial (Second)	421		421
17	Commercial (Third)	288		288
18	Industrial (First)	421		421
19	Industrial (Second)	592		592
20	Finance	114		114
21	Financial Services	760		760
22	Sports, Performing Arts, Culture and Publication	257		257
23	Import and Export	231		231
24	Textiles and Garment	348		348
25	Wholesale and Retail	2,015		2,015
26	Technology and Innovation	73		73
27	Catering	141		141
28	HKSAR members of NPC and CPPCC, representatives of national organisations		678	678
Total		8,579	210,675	219,254

=== Election Committee Constituency ===
The Election Committee constituency was one of the three constituencies designed in the Basic Law of Hong Kong next to the directly elected geographical constituencies and the indirectly elected functional constituencies for the first and second-term Legislative Council fin the early SAR period. With the last British Governor Chris Patten's electoral reform, the ECC was composed of all elected District Board members who had been elected in 1994. The Single Transferable Vote system was used in the 1995 election.

After the handover of Hong Kong, the ECC was allocated 10 seats out of the total 60 seats in the SAR Legislative Council, comprising all members of the Election Committee which also elected the Chief Executive every five years. The size of the constituency reduced to six seats in 2000 and was entirely abolished and replaced by the directly elected geographical constituency seats in the 2004 election. The plurality-at-large voting system was used in 1998 and 2000.

In the 2021 electoral overhaul, the Election Committee constituency was reintroduced, taking 40 of the 90 seats, almost half, of the Legislative Council with plurality-at-large voting system. The electorate is composed of all newly expanded 1,500 members in the Election Committee.

=== 2010 electoral reform ===
The Legislative Council passed the Government's bill on amending Annex II of the Basic Law. The total number of Legislative Council members is increased from 60 to 70. Alongside the creation of five new geographical constituency seats, five new functional constituency seats were created in the District Council (Second) FC. The 5 new FC seats were returned by direct elections through proportional representation using the largest remainder method with Hare quota.

The 2010 electoral reform provides for parallel voting, in which each registered voter can participate in the elections of one geographical constituency and one functional constituency.

Parallel Voting in Legislative Council elections (2012–2021)
	Geographical Constituencies	Functional Constituencies
Voters eligible for traditional FCs	1 vote in respective GCs	1 vote in respective traditional FCs
Other voters	1 vote in respective GCs	1 vote in the District Council (Second) FC

The District Council (Second) FC was abolished by the National People's Congress under the 2021 Hong Kong electoral changes.

=== 2012 by-election procedure amendment proposal ===
In mid-May 2011, the government, which considered the resignations leading to "de facto referendum" (2010 Hong Kong by-election) 'abusive' and a waste of resources, revealed its plan to do away with by-elections entirely. Secretary for Constitutional and Mainland Affairs Stephen Lam proposed that a Legislative Council seat in any geographical constituency or one of the newly created five-seat district council 'superconstituency' vacated by the resignation or death of a legislator would be filled by a 'leapfrog' mechanism by the next best placed candidate at the previous election. The plan attracted criticism from Pan-Democrats; even its allies in the legislature expressed reservations about the workability of the plan. The Bar Association severely criticised the plan, expressing concern over the constitutionality of the proposals, particularly the reasonableness on restrictions on the right to participation.

The government tabled a bill to amend current legislation for by-elections for 13 July. Following call by the Central Government Liaison Office to re-think, the government revised its proposal on 28 June stipulating replacement by an unsuccessful candidate on the same election ticket. The government bowed to pressure and announced one week later that it would suspend reading of the bill for two months, pending consultations on the revised proposals.

=== Electoral performances by party ===
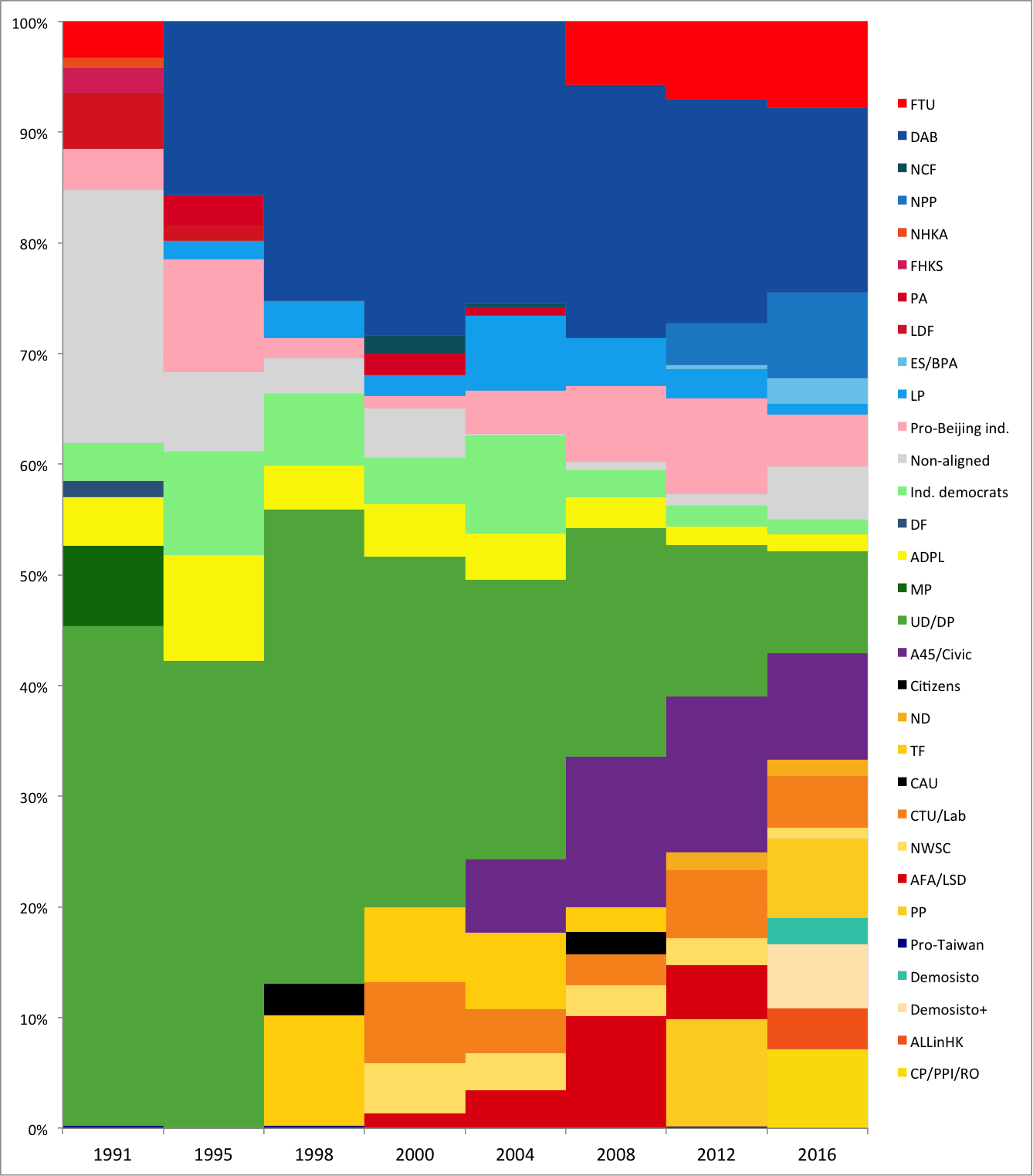
Vote share of the Legislative Council elections by party since 1991.

Party	1998		2000		2004		2008		2012		2016	
Party	%	Seats	%	Seats	%	Seats	%	Seats	%	Seats	%	Seats
Democratic	42.87	13	31.66	12	25.19	9	20.63	8	13.65	6	9.22	7
Liberal	3.40	10	1.88	8	6.72	10	4.33	7	2.69	5	0.99	4
DAB	25.23	9	28.40	11	22.73	10	22.92	10	20.22	13	16.68	12
PA	–	5	1.95	4	0.80	0						
Frontier	10.03	3	6.78	2	6.89	1	2.19	1				
Citizens	2.81	1										
ADPL	3.99	0	4.75	1	4.22	1	2.79	1	1.69	1	1.53	0
CTU			7.33	2	3.95	1	2.80	1				
NWSC			4.50	1	3.33	1	2.80	1	2.42	1	0.97	1
New Forum			1.60	1	0.25	0			–	1	–	1
AFA			1.38	0	3.44	1						
FTU					2.97	3	5.70	4	7.06	6	7.93	5
Civic							13.66	5	14.08	6	9.59	6
LSD							10.10	3	4.86	1	2.61	1
Civic Act-up							2.04	1				
Labour									6.19	4	4.70	1
People Power									9.73	3	4.59	1
ES									0.32	3		
NPP									3.76	2	7.73	3
KWND									1.91	1		
ND									1.58	1	1.46	0
BPA											2.29	7
Youngspiration											2.06	2
Civic Passion											5.63	1
Demosisto											2.34	1
DG											1.76	1

== District Council elections ==
There are eighteen districts, and thus eighteen District Councils in Hong Kong, each being a city council for its district. There is one constituency for, on average, every 17,000 residents, as there are 452 directly elected constituencies for 2019, and over 7.4 million residents in Hong Kong. A member is elected from each constituency by plurality vote. The chairpersons of the 27 rural committees are ex officio members of the councils.

In 2023, the district council are reformed. The total directly seat are dropped from 452 to 88, only less than 19% seat can be directly elected. A new district council eligibility review committee established to review candidate qualification.

== Elections of deputies to the National People's Congress ==
Article 21 of The Basic Law of HKSAR stipulates:

Chinese citizens who are residents of the Hong Kong Special Administrative Region shall be entitled to participate in the management of state affairs according to law. In accordance with the assigned number of seats and the selection method specified by the National People's Congress (NPC), Chinese citizens among permanent residents of the Hong Kong Special Administrative Region shall locally elect deputies of the Region to the National People's Congress to participate in the work of the highest organ of state power.

The 36 Hong Kong deputies to the National People's Congress are chosen by an electoral college composed of the following as specified in the Method for Election of Deputies of the Hong Kong Special Administrative Region of the People's Republic of China to the Eleventh National People's Congress passed in March 2022:

- Members of the Election Committee (which elects the chief executive) who are Chinese nationals, except those who opt out; and
- The Chief Executive of the HKSAR

A total of 1,989 electors returned Hong Kong deputies in the 2017 election.

== Village Representative elections ==
Rural Representatives consist of Village Representatives and Kaifong Representatives.

The Court of Final Appeal ruled that the Secretary for Home Affairs had to consider whether the person elected to represent a village was elected in accordance with electoral arrangements consistent with the Bill of Rights and the Sex Discrimination Ordinance whether to approve an elected Village Representative in December 2000. This decision caused Hong Kong Government to set up new arrangements for Village Representative. There are two types of Village Representatives, namely

- Indigenous Inhabitant Representative representing indigenous inhabitants of an Indigenous Village; and
- Resident Representative representing all residents of an Existing Village

Indigenous Inhabitant of an Indigenous Village that existed in 1898 (whether or not the name the Village now has is the same name it had in 1898) refers to:

- a person who was in 1898 a resident of the Village; or
- a person who is descended through the male line from a person mentioned above.

In 2013, the new Village Representative Election Ordinance has been implemented that the Kaifong Representatives from Cheung Chau and Peng Chau are regulated by the Home Affairs Department. The first new arrangements Village Representative elections was held in 2019. The next Village Representative elections would be held in 2023.

== Electoral results ==
Legislative Council elections
Election	Largest faction in LegCo	Composition of LegCo (by alignment)	Largest faction in directly elected seats	Composition of directly elected seats (by alignment)	% of popular vote won by the largest faction in directly elected seats	Turnout in direct election
1991	Pro-Beijing/ Conservative; Camp	23:4:34	Pro-democracy; Camp	16:2	61.63%	35.72%
1995	Pro-democracy; Camp	31:29	Pro-democracy; Camp	16:4	61.13%	35.42%
1998	Pro-Beijing; Camp	20:40	Pro-democracy; Camp	15:5	66.36%	53.29%
2000	Pro-Beijing; Camp	21:39	Pro-democracy; Camp	16:8	60.56%	43.57%
2004	Pro-Beijing; Camp	25:35	Pro-democracy; Camp	18:12	62.44%	55.63%
2008	Pro-Beijing; Camp	23:37	Pro-democracy; Camp	19:11	59.50%	45.20%
2012	Pro-Beijing; Camp	27:43	Pro-democracy; Camp	21:19	56.24% (GC); 50.73% (DCII)	53.05% (GC); 51.95% (DCII)
2016	Pro-Beijing; Camp	29:1:41	Pro-democracy; Camp	21:19	55.02% (GC); 58.02% (DCII)	58.28% (GC); 57.09% (DCII)
2021	Pro-Beijing; Camp	1:89	Pro-Beijing; Camp	0:20	91.25%	30.20%

Municipal elections
Election	Largest faction in elected seats	Composition of elected seats (by alignment)	% of popular vote won by the largest faction in elected seats	Turnout
1983	Conservative Camp	8:7	33.93%	22.37%
1986	Pro-democracy camp	9:10:8	29.13%	26.92%
1989	Pro-democracy camp	11:8:8	33.73%	17.60%
1991	Pro-democracy camp	15:5:7	47.23%	23.14%
1995	Pro-democracy camp	34:1:24	51.51%	22.93%

District Council elections
Election	Largest faction in elected seats	Composition of elected seats (by alignment)	% of popular vote won by the largest faction in elected seats	Turnout
1994	Pro-Beijing Camp	146:4:196	54.12%	33.14%
1999	Pro-Beijing Camp	157:1:232	54.69%	35.82%
2003	Pro-Beijing Camp	198:1:201	46.48%	44.10%
2007	Pro-Beijing Camp	127:2:276	53.98%	38.83%
2011	Pro-Beijing Camp	103:8:301	55.42%	41.49%
2015	Pro-Beijing Camp	126:7:298	54.61%	47.01%
2019	Pro-democracy camp	388:2:62	57.09%	71.23%

Legends

- ：Pro-democracy Camp
- ：Pro-Beijing Camp
- ：non-aligned and others

== See also ==
- Electoral calendar (global)
- Politics of Hong Kong
- List of constituencies of Hong Kong
- 2010 Hong Kong electoral reform
- 2014–15 Hong Kong electoral reform
- 2021 Hong Kong electoral reform
- 2012 Dual Universal Suffrage (Hong Kong)
