= Joint Committee on the Promotion of Democratic Government =

Joint Committee on the Promotion of Democratic Government 民主政制促進聯委會
- Abbreviation: JCPDG
- Founder: Martin Lee; Szeto Wah
- Founded: 27 October 1986
- Dissolved: 21 May 1989
- Succeeded by: Hong Kong Alliance in Support of Patriotic; Democratic Movements in China
- Ideology: Liberalism (HK)
- Regional affiliation: Pro-democracy camp

The Joint Committee on the Promotion of Democratic Government (Chinese: 民主政制促進聯委會, abbreviated 民促會; JGPDG) was an umbrella organisation representing various groups of the pro-democracy movement in Hong Kong. It was established on 27 October 1986 by 190 groups and led by the prominent pro-democracy figures Szeto Wah and Martin Lee, two members in the Hong Kong Basic Law Drafting Committee (BLDC), pushing for a faster pace of democratisation in the drafting of the Basic Law of Hong Kong.

For the transition period up to 1997, the committee demanded direct election in the 1988 Legislative Council, a "through train" arrangement for letting Legislative Council members elected in 1995 automatically becoming the members of the first legislature in the SAR government after 1997. They also demanded the Chief Executive to be elected by universal suffrage.

The committee formed the backbone of today's pro-democracy camp as many of its key members formed the Hong Kong Alliance in Support of Patriotic Democratic Movements in China during the Tiananmen protests of 1989 and the United Democrats of Hong Kong (later transformed into Democratic Party) for the first direct election in 1991.

== Members ==
=== Political groups ===
- Association for Democracy and Justice
- China–Hong Kong Society
- Christian Communist Critics
- Hong Kong Affairs Society
- Hong Kong Association for Democracy and People's Livelihood
- Hong Kong Policy Viewers
- Hong Kong Society for the Advancement of Justice
- Meeting Point
- New Hong Kong Society
- Pei Shum Society
- Sam Fong Society

=== Educational bodies ===
- Education Action Group
- Hong Kong Professional Teachers' Union
- Hong Kong Education Research Group
- Technical Institute Teachers' Association

=== Unions and labour organisations ===
- Association of Government Land and Engineering Surveying Officers
- Association for Accident Victims
- Federation of Civil Service Unions
- Government Construction Technology and Survey
- Government Cookers' Union
- Government Surveyor Association
- Hong Kong Christian Industrial Committee

=== Religious bodies ===
- Hong Kong Christian Sentinels
- Kowloon West Community Church
- Kwun Tong Community Church
- Public Policy Committee, Hong Kong Christian Council

=== Student bodies ===
- Current Affairs Committee, Students Union, CUHK
- Current Affairs Committee, Students Union, HKP
- Current Affairs Committee, Students Union, HKU
- Hong Kong Federation of Students
- Hong Kong Students Christian Movement
- Social Services Group, Student Union, Shue Yan College
- Student Union, Hong Kong Baptist College

=== Social services and social workers' unions ===
- Hong Kong Social Workers General Union
- Kwun Tong Methodist Community Centre
- Methodist Epworth Village Community Centre
- On Wing Social Services Centre
- Salvation Army Employees' Association
- Workers Association, HK Federation of Youth Groups

=== Community groups ===
- Association for Better Living in Butterfly Bay
- Cha Kwoa Lane THA Resident's Association
- Choi Hung Estate Residents Association
- Concern Group for Development of Southern District
- District board member's Office, Chan Chi-keung
- District board member's Office, Chan Yuen-sum
- District board member's Office, Cheng Kam-wah
- District board member's Office, Cheung Ka-man
- District board member's Office, Choi Cheung Yuet-lan
- District board member's Office, Choi Wai-shek
- District board member's Office, Hung Wing-tat
- District board member's Office, Lai Kwok-hung
- District board member's Office, Lee Chi-fai
- District board member's Office, Li Wah-ming
- District board member's Office, Lee Yuk-wah
- District board member's Office, Liu Sing-lee
- District board member's Office, Luk King-shing
- District board member's Office, Luk Shun-tim
- District board member's Office, Mok Ying-fan
- District board member's Office, Ng Kin-sang
- District board member's Office, Ng Wai-lo
- District board member's Office, Sin Chung-kai
- District board member's Office, Tang Sun-wah
- District board member's Office, Tse Man-kai
- District board member's Office, Tsui Kim-ling
- District board member's Office, Wong Chi-kwan
- District board member's Office, Wong Chung-chuen
- District board member's Office, Wong Yiu-chung
- District board member's Office, Yeung Mei-kwong
- District board member's Office, Yim Tin-sang
- District board member's Office, Chan Mo-pau & Yeung Shuk-chuen
- District board member's Office, Chu Wai-bun & Ng Ming-yum
- Hong Kong Society of Community Organisation
- Hong Kong People's Council on Housing Policy
- Joint Committee of Community Organisation on Concerning Basic Law
- Kowloon City Development Council
- Lai King Estate Residents Association
- Regional Council Member's Office, Tsang Kwok-yuen
- Regional Council Member's Office, Wong Man-tai
- Regional Council & District board member's Office, Lai Kam-cheung & Lee Ho-fai
- Regional Council & District board member's Office, Lai On-kwok & Lee Wing-tat
- Research Centre on the Development of Central & Western District
- Shamshuipo Development and Service Centre
- Shamshuipo People's Livelihood Concern Group
- Shatin Concern Group
- Society for the Rights of Butterfly Bay's Residents
- Tsing Yi Concern Group
- Tuen Mun People's Livelihood Concern Association
- Tuen Mun Tsuen Wai Voluntary Society
- Urban Council Member's Office, Fok Pui-yee
- Urban Council Member's Office, Lam Chak-piu
- Urban Council Member's Office, Lee Chik-yuet
- Urban Council Member's Office, Tong Kam-piu
- Urban Council & District board members' Office, Fung Kin-kee, Leung Kam-to, Tam Kwok-kiu
- Yaumatei Community Research Group

== See also ==
- 1988 Hong Kong electoral reform
- Group of 190
