= 1986 Hong Kong municipal elections =

- 6 March 1986

15 (of the 30) seats to the Urban Council 12 (of the 36) seats to the Regional Council
- Registered: 1,441,540
- Turnout: 362,107 (26.92%)
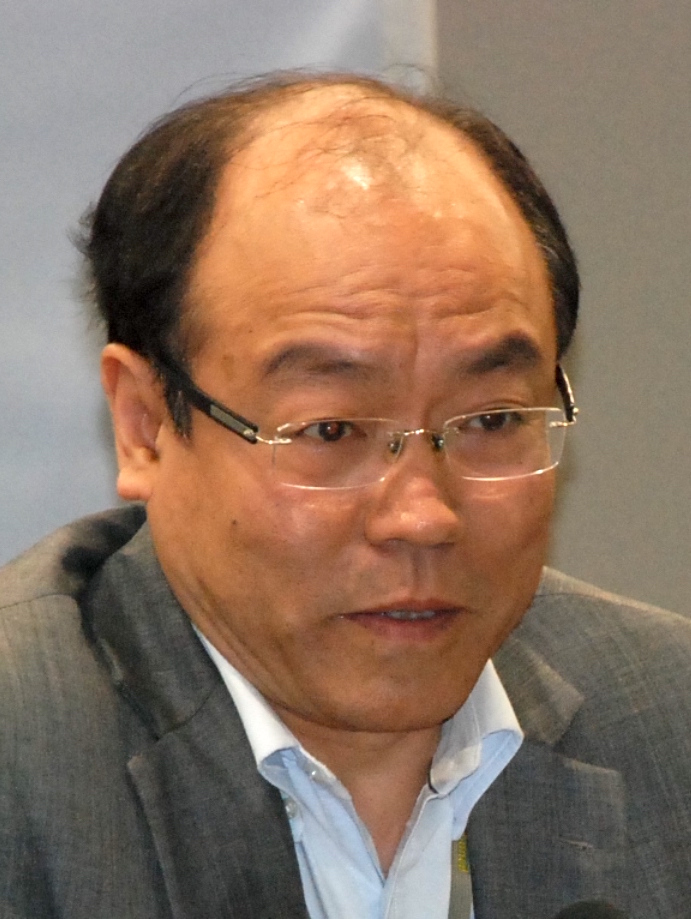

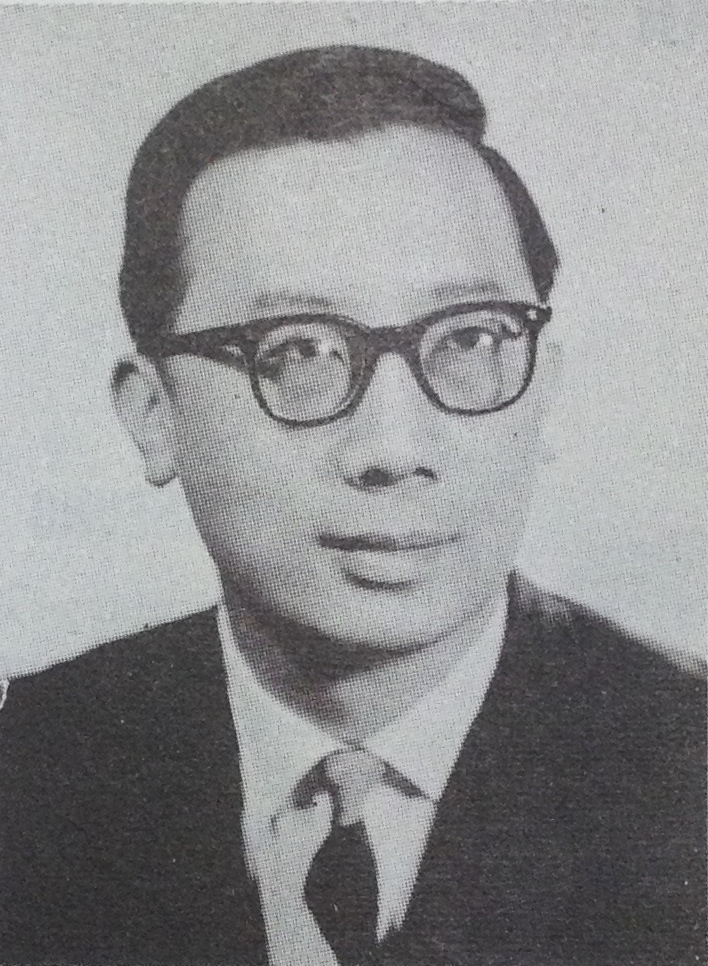

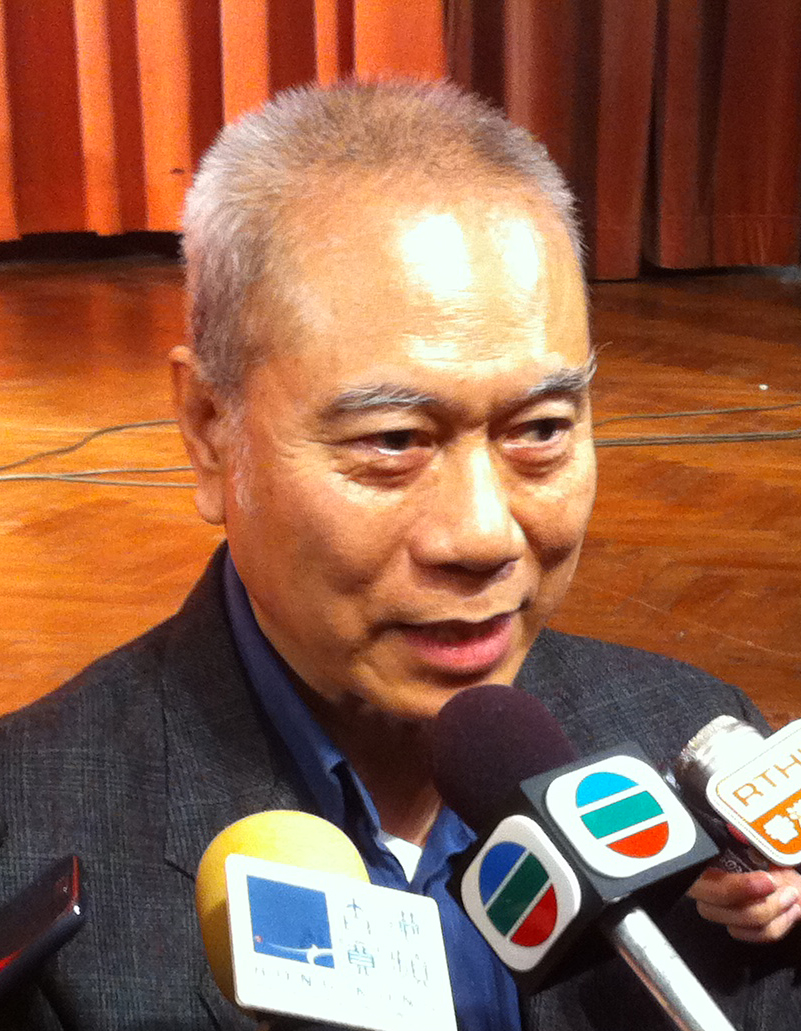

	First party	Second party	Third party
Leader	Frederick Fung	Hilton Cheong-Leen	Lau Nai-keung
Party	PCPHP	Civic	Meeting Point
Leader's seat	Sham Shui Po East	Wan Chai	Did not stand
Last election	2 seats, 10.98%	4 seats, 18.58%	New party
Seats won	5 UC; 1 RC	3 UC —	1 UC; 1 RC
Seat change	▲4	▼1	▲1
Popular vote	47,833	44,427	35,411
Percentage	13.58%	12.60%	10.06%
Swing	▲2.60pp	▼5.98pp	N/A
	Fourth party	Fifth party
Leader	Brook Bernacchi	Huang Chen-ya
Party	Reform	HKAS
Leader's seat	Shau Kei Wan (lost seat)	Did not stand
Last election	3 seats, 15.38%	New party
Seats won	2 UC —	1 UC; 0 RC
Seat change	▼1	Steady
Popular vote	24,486	19,330
Percentage	6.95%	5.49%
Swing	▼8.43pp	N/A
Chairmen before election
Hilton Cheong-Leen (UC)
RegCo new established
Elected Chairmen
Hugh Forsgate (UC)
Cheung Yan-lung (RC)

The 1986 Hong Kong Urban Council and Regional Council elections were the municipal elections held on 6 March 1986 for the elected seats of the Urban Council for Hong Kong Island, Kowloon and New Kowloon and newly created Regional Council for the rest of the New Territories respectively.

== Overview ==
15 seats in the Urban Council remained the directly elected by the general residents and 15 appointed by the Governor. For the newly formed Regional Council, 12 seats were directly elected and 9 seats were elected by the New Territories District Boards members, with 12 appointed members and 3 ex officio members of the chairman and two vice chairmen of the Heung Yee Kuk. The first-past-the-post voting system was used.

Total of 362,725, which shared 27 per cent of the voters cast their votes on the election day on 6 March, 143,888 of which voted (35.9 per cent turnout) in the Regional Council and 218,837 of them (23.2 per cent turnout) voted in the Urban Council, slightly higher than the 1983 Urban Council Election.

Among 12 incumbent Urban Councillors, only veteran Brook Bernacchi of the Reform Club of Hong Kong and Chow Wai-hung of the Hong Kong Civic Association failed to be re-elected. The oldest elected Urban Councillor was Elsie Tu who was already 72 years old, while 64 years old Kwong Ping-yau was the oldest Regional Councillor. For the Regional Council, 10 out of 27 councillors elected were social workers, while there were also 7 education workers.

The grassroots organisation Hong Kong People's Council on Public Housing Policy (PCPHP) had candidates it supported being elected Kwun Tong, Sham Shui Po, Shau Kei Wan and Wong Tai Sin while the other new political groups such as the Hong Kong Affairs Society and Meeting Point had both victories and defeats in different areas.

== General results ==
Overall Summary of the 6 March 1986 Urban Council and Regional Council Hong Kong election results
Political affiliation	Urban Council			Regional Council			Total		
Political affiliation	Popular votes	Standing	Elected	Popular votes	Standing	Elected	Popular votes	%	Total seats gained
Hong Kong People's Council on Public Housing Policy (Note: Note: the votes gained by Ng Ming-yum who represents both Meeting Point and PCPHP is overlapped in this table.)	33,038	4	4	14,795	2	2	47,833	13.58	6
Hong Kong Civic Association	44,027	9	3	400	1	0	44,427	12.60	3
Meeting Point	17,013	2	1	18,398	2	1	35,411	10.06	2
Reform Club of Hong Kong	24,486	5	2	-	-	-	24,486	6.95	2
Hong Kong Affairs Society	15,377	3	1	3,953	1	0	19,330	5.49	1
Individuals and others	75,527	16	4	119,925	35	10	195,452	55.50	14
Total (turnout: 26.9%)	209,468	39	15	142,676	40	12	352,144	100.00	27

== Elected members ==
=== Urban Council ===
District	Constituency	Candidates	Affiliation
Central & Western	Central & Western	Chow Wai-keung	Independent
Wan Chai	Wan Chai	Hilton Cheong-Leen	Civic
Eastern	North Point	Man Sai-cheong	HKAS
Eastern	Shau Kei Wan	Cheung Wai-ping	Independent
Southern	Southern	Joseph Chan Yuek-sut	Civic
Kowloon City	Kowloon City West	Peter Chan Chi-kwan	Civic
Kowloon City	Kowloon City East	Pao Ping-wing	PCPHP
Kwun Tong	Kwun Tong West	Elsie Tu	Independent
Kwun Tong	Kwun Tong East	Lam Chak-piu	PCPHP
Mong Kok	Mong Kok	Chan Kwok-ming	Independent
Yau Tsim	Yau Ma Tei	Kwan Lim-ho	Reform
Sham Shui Po	Sham Shui Po East	Frederick Fung Kin-kee	PCPHP
Sham Shui Po	Sham Shui Po West	Lee Chik-yuet	Meeting Point
Wong Tai Sin	Wong Tai Sin South	Fok Pui-yee	PCPHP
Wong Tai Sin	Wong Tai Sin North	Cecilia Yeung Lai-yin	Reform

=== Regional Council ===
District	Constituency	Candidate	Affiliation
Tsuen Wan	Tsuen Wan	Albert Chan Wai-yip	Independent
Tuen Mun	Tuen Mun East	Tsang Kwok-yuen	Independent
Tuen Mun	Tuen Mun West	Ng Ming-yum	Meeting Point/PCPHP
Yuen Long	Yuen Long	Tang Kam-fat	Independent
North	North	Tang Kwok-yung	Independent
Tai Po	Tai Po	Michael Lai Kam-cheung	Independent
Sai Kung	Sai Kung	Wong Shui-sang	Independent
Sha Tin	Sha Tin East	Cheung Chi-yuen	Independent
Sha Tin	Sha Tin West	Lau Kong-wah	Independent
Kwai Tsing	Kwai Chung East	Lee Wing-tat	Independent
Kwai Tsing	Kwai Chung West & Tsing Yi	Wong Man-tai	PCPHP
Islands	Islands	Kwong Ping-yau	Independent
