= 1989 Hong Kong municipal elections =

- 9 March 1989

15 (of the 40) seats to the Urban Council 12 (of the 36) seats to the Regional Council
- Registered: 1,604,048 ▲11.27%
- Turnout: 213,200 (17.60%) ▼9.32pp
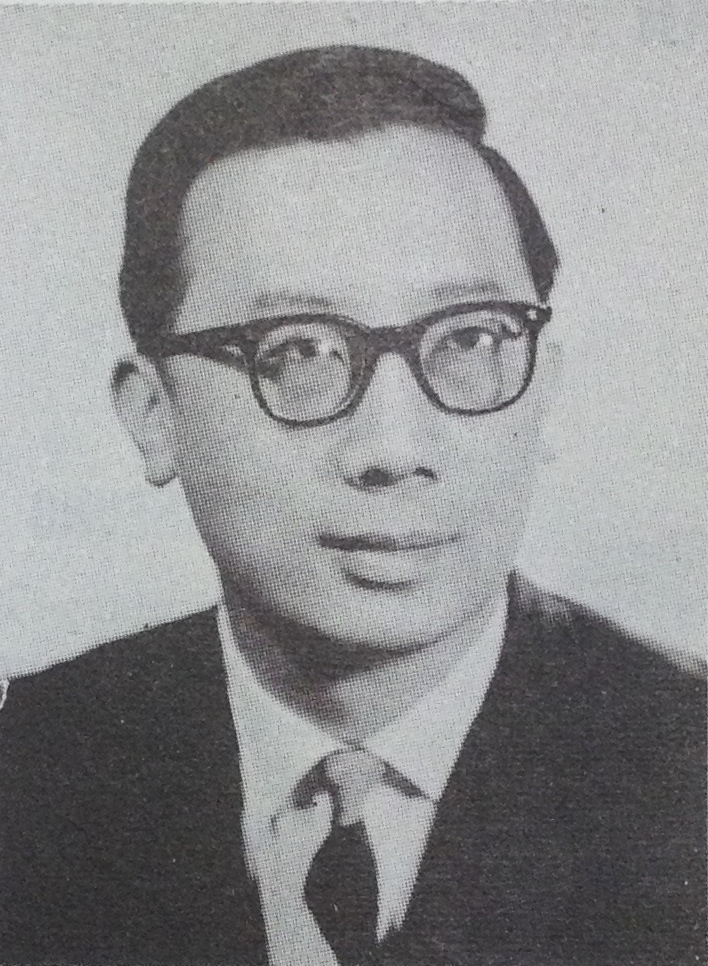

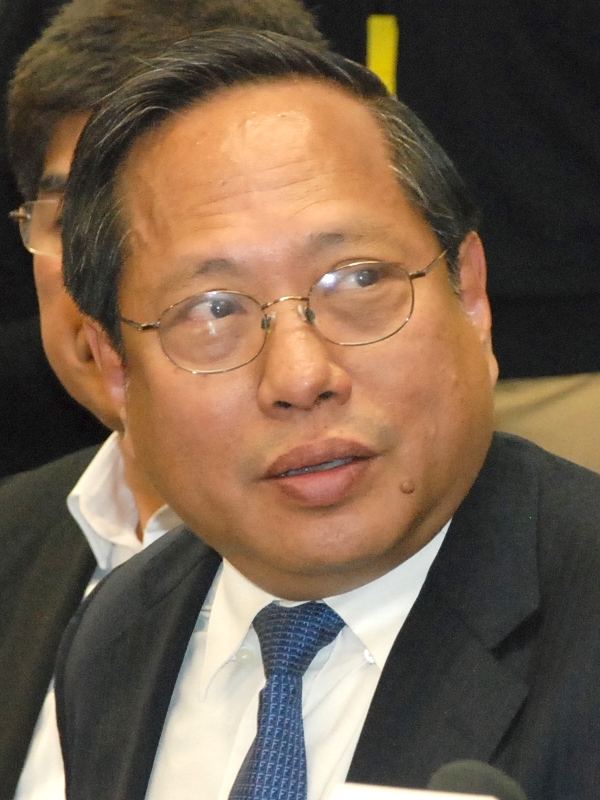

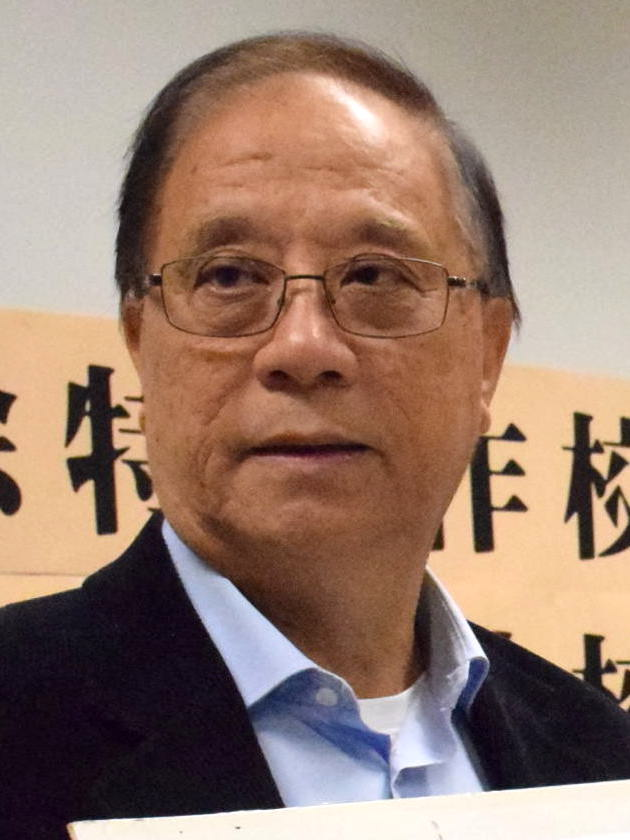

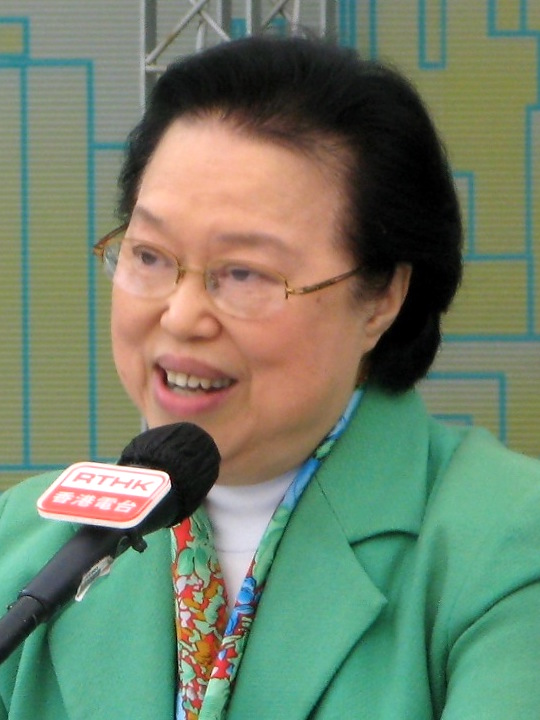
	First party	Second party	Third party
Leader	Ding Lik-kiu	Hilton Cheong-Leen	Albert Ho
Party	ADPL	Civic	HKAS
Leader's seat	Did not stand	Wan Chai	Did not stand
Last election	New party	3 seats, 12.60%	2 seats, 6.51%
Seats before	3	4	2
Seats won	2 UC; 2 RC	4 UC —	2 UC; 1 RC
Seat change	▲1	Steady	Steady
Popular vote	21,243	15,270	18,699
Percentage	9.99%	7.18%	8.80%
Swing	N/A	▼5.42pp	▲0.15pp
	Fourth party	Fifth party	Sixth party
Leader	Yeung Sum	Maria Tam	Brook Bernacchi
Party	Meeting Point	PHKS	Reform
Leader's seat	Did not stand	Did not stand	Sau Kei Wan
Last election	2 seats, 10.06%	2 seats, 6.94%	2 seats, 6.95%
Seats before	2	2	2
Seats won	— 2 RC	1 UC; 1 RC	1 UC; 1 RC
Seat change	Steady	Steady	Steady
Popular vote	21,702	20,079	13,404
Percentage	10.21%	9.44%	6.31%
Swing	▲0.15pp	▲2.50pp	▼0.64pp
Chairmen before election
Hugh Forsgate (UC)
Cheung Yan-lung (RC)
Elected Chairmen
Hugh Forsgate (UC)
Cheung Yan-lung (RC)

The 1989 Hong Kong Urban Council and Regional Council elections were the municipal elections held on 9 March 1989 for the elected seats of the Urban Council and Regional Council respectively.

== Overview ==
15 seats in the Urban Council was the directly elected by the general residents and ten seats were elected by the Hong Kong Island and Kowloon District Boards members and fifteen appointed by the Governor. For the Regional Council, twelve seats were directly elected and 9 seats were elected by the New Territories District Boards members, with twelve appointed members and three ex officio members of the Chairman and two vice chairmen of the Heung Yee Kuk. The first-past-the-post voting system was used.

A total of 213,352 voters, 17.6% of the total electorates cast their votes, in which 105,826 voters (14.2%) voted in the Urban Council, 9% lower than the last election, and 107,526 voters (23.9%) voted in the Regional Council, about 10% lower than the last election. 7 of the total of 53 candidates were elected without uncontestedly. Secretary for Constitutional Affairs Michael Suen Ming-yeung expressed his disappointment with the low turnout, explained that the uncontested and less candidates were the factor.

Among 19 contesting incumbents only Fok Pui-yee failed to be re-elected. Albert Chan Wai-yip, supported by pro-democrat heavyweights Martin Lee Chu-ming and Szeto Wah helped him to canvass votes in Tsuen Wan. Szeto Wah's presence in Luk Yeung Sun Chuen helped attracting votes where many teachers living there. Yeung Fuk-kwong, Chan's opponent cited that the loss of votes from his voter base Shek Wai Kok Estate led to his defeat.

== General results ==
Overall Summary of the 9 March 1989 Urban Council and Regional Council Hong Kong election results
Political affiliation	Urban Council			Regional Council			Total		
Political affiliation	Popular votes	Standing	Elected	Popular votes	Standing	Elected	Popular votes	%	Total seats gained
Hong Kong Association for Democracy and People's Livelihood	12,237	2	2	9,006	2	2	21,243	9.99	4
Hong Kong Civic Association	15,270	6	4	-	-	-	15,270	7.18	4
Hong Kong Affairs Society	11,787	3	2	6,912	1	1	18,699	8.80	3
Meeting Point	-	-	-	21,702	4	2	21,702	10.21	2
Progressive Hong Kong Society	7,630	3	1	12,449	2	1	20,079	9.44	2
Reform Club of Hong Kong	13,404	2	2	-	-	-	13,404	6.31	2
New Territories West Residents Association	-	-	-	8,310	1	1	8,310	3.91	1
Hong Kong People's Council on Public Housing Policy	7,187	1	1	-	-	-	7,187	3.38	1
Individuals and others	37,556	13	3	49,139	13	5	86,695	40.78	8
Total (turnout: 17.6%)	105,071	30	15	107,518	23	12	212,589	100.00	27

== Elected members ==
=== Urban Council ===
District	Constituency	Candidates	Affiliation
Central & Western	Central & Western	Chow Wai-keung	HKAS
Wan Chai	Wan Chai	Hilton Cheong-Leen	Civic
Eastern	North Point	Man Sai-cheong	HKAS
Eastern	Shau Kei Wan	Brook Bernacchi	Reform
Southern	Southern	Joseph Chan Yuek-sut	Civic
Kowloon City	Kowloon City West	Peter Chan Chi-kwan	Civic
Kowloon City	Kowloon City East	Pao Ping-wing	PHKS
Kwun Tong	Kwun Tong West	Elsie Tu	Independent
Kwun Tong	Kwun Tong East	Lam Chak-piu	PCPHP
Mong Kok	Mong Kok	Chan Kwok-ming	Independent
Yau Tsim	Yau Tsim	Daniel Wong Kwok-tung	Independent
Sham Shui Po	Sham Shui Po East	Frederick Fung Kin-kee	ADPL
Sham Shui Po	Sham Shui Po West	Ma Lee-wo	Independent
Wong Tai Sin	Wong Tai Sin South	Mok Ying-fan	ADPL
Wong Tai Sin	Wong Tai Sin North	Cecilia Yeung Lai-yin	Reform

=== Regional Council ===
District	Constituency	Candidate	Affiliation
Tsuen Wan	Tsuen Wan	Albert Chan Wai-yip	ADPL
Tuen Mun	Tuen Mun East	Almon Poon Chin-hung	NTWRA
Tuen Mun	Tuen Mun West	Ng Ming-yum	Meeting Point
Yuen Long	Yuen Long	Ngan Kam-chuen	Independent
North	North	Cheung Hon-chung	PHKS
Tai Po	Tai Po	Michael Lai Kam-cheung	Meeting Point
Sai Kung	Sai Kung	Wong Shui-sang	Independent
Sha Tin	Sha Tin East	Tony Kan Chung-nin	HKAS
Sha Tin	Sha Tin West	Lau Kong-wah	Independent
Kwai Tsing	Kwai Chung East	Chow Yick-hay	ADPL
Kwai Tsing	Kwai Chung West & Tsing Yi	Wong Man-tai	Independent
Islands	Islands	Kwong Ping-yau	Independent
