= Hong Kong Affairs Society =

Hong Kong Affairs Society 太平山學會
- President: Huang Chen-ya; Albert Ho
- Founded: February 1984
- Dissolved: April 1990
- Succeeded by: United Democrats of Hong Kong
- Ideology: Liberalism (Hong Kong)
- Regional affiliation: Pro-democracy camp

Hong Kong Affairs Society
- Traditional Chinese: 太平山學會
Transcriptions
Yue: Cantonese
- Yale Romanization: Taai Pìhng Sāan Hohk Wuih
- Jyutping: Taai^{3} Ping^{4} Saan^{1} Hok^{6} Wui^{6*2}

The Hong Kong Affairs Society (Chinese: 太平山學會) was a middle class and professionals oriented political organisation formed in 1984 for the discussion for the Hong Kong prospect and political constitution after the handover to China with about 20 members led by Huang Chen-ya, Man Sai-cheong and liberal lawyer Albert Ho and grew to about 120 in 1987. It was established as a group of political commentary but increasingly involved in subsequent municipal and district boards elections. In the 1980s it was one of the three major pro-democracy groups (the other two being Hong Kong Association for Democracy and People's Livelihood and Meeting Point). In October 1986, the Society joined the Joint Committee on the Promotion of Democratic Government which consisted of about 190 organizations, putting forward to proposal of direct election in the 1988 Legislative Council election but was rejected. Its leader Albert Ho and most of its members later on joined the newly established United Democrats of Hong Kong in 1990.

== Electoral performance ==
=== Municipal elections ===
Election	Number of popular votes	% of popular votes	UrbCo seats	RegCo seats	Total elected seats
1986	19,330	5.49	1 / 15	0 / 12	1 / 27
1989	18,699▼	8.80▲	2 / 15	1 / 12	3 / 27

=== District Board elections ===
Election	Number of popular votes	% of popular votes	Total elected seats	+/−
1985	4,148	0.60	3 / 237	3▲
1988	36,666▲	5.75▲	17 / 264	8▲

== See also ==
- List of political parties in Hong Kong
