= Hong Kong councillor =

Hong Kong councillor is a title for the members of Legislative Council and District Councils.

- For the members of Legislative Council, see Legislative Council of Hong Kong
- For the members of District Councils, see District Councils of Hong Kong

In the history, Hong Kong councillor also means

- For the members of Urban Council, see Urban Council
- For the members of Regional Council, see Regional Council (Hong Kong)
- For the members of Executive Council before transfer of sovereignty, see Executive Council of Hong Kong
  - After transfer of sovereignty, the members of Executive Council are not titled councillor
