= War of Positions =

- Production company: Action Films
- Release date: 1983
- Running time: 67 minutes

War of Positions (位置之戰) is a Hong Kong independent documentary about the 1983 Urban Council elections. Produced by Action Films, a documentary group with a focus on social issues, the film is directed mainly by Lo King-wah and Stephen Teo, along with filmmakers Lo Shu-ki, and Leung Po-lam. In a special catalogue for the 12th Hong Kong International Film Festival, Teo described the film to be "Hong Kong’s first direct-cinema documentary."

== Synopsis ==
The film follows social workers Frederick Fung, a member of the Hong Kong People's Council on Housing Policy, and independent candidate Lee Chik-yuet as they campaign in Sham Shui Po for the 1983 Urban Council elections, which is the first time for direct elections to be held in such scale. The film follows their meetings and voter outreach as they explain the significance of voting to residents, many of whom have limited knowledge of the political system, while connecting electoral participation to everyday concerns such as affordable public housing. Through street interviews and campaign activities, the documentary also captures the political awareness and social conditions of Sham Shui Po in the 1980s. The district recorded a voter turnout of over 26%, above the 22% average, and both Fung and Lee won their elections.

== Production ==
Following Margaret Thatcher's 1982 visit to Beijing and negotiations over Hong Kong's future, while economic instability led the Hong Kong government to peg the Hong Kong dollar to the US dollar. The film was produced in an important moment in Hong Kong's history

The film was primarily directed and edited by Lo King-wah, a Hong Kong-born filmmaker who studied film and documentary in Canada, returned to Hong Kong in 1981, and joined RTHK after previously identifying as a Maoist. Before this work, he had documented poor living conditions in Ma Chai Hang with a Super-8 camera, winning Best Documentary at the Hong Kong Independent Short Film Festival. Co-director Stephen Teo, born and raised in Malaysia, also had a Maoist background at the time and worked for the NGO that sponsored the film.

The film opens with a quotation from Antonio Gramsci's The Prison Notebooks, from which the film takes its title. Gramsci's concept of a "war of position" is a gradual political struggle through participation in and transformation of civil society, rather than direct confrontation. This concept resonated with Hong Kong’s position between socialist China and colonial Britain, while also reflecting debates among activists over whether to participate in or reject the British colonial electoral system. Stylistically, the film combines observational and participatory documentary techniques. It has no voice-over narration and records both campaign activities and everyday life in 1980s Sham Shui Po.
