= Association for Democracy and Justice =

Association for Democracy and Justice 民主公義協會
- Founded: 1985
- Succeeded by: Hong Kong Association for Democracy and People's Livelihood (ADPL)

Association for Democracy and Justice
- Traditional Chinese: 民主公義協會
Transcriptions
Yue: Cantonese
- Yale Romanization: Màhn jyú gūng yih hip wuih
- Jyutping: Man^{4} zyu^{2} gung^{1} ji^{6} hip^{3} wui^{6}

The Association for Democracy and Justice (Chinese: 民主公義協會) was a short-lived liberal political organisation in Hong Kong during the mid-1980s as the predecessor of the Hong Kong Association for Democracy and People's Livelihood (ADPL).

== History ==
It was founded in 1985 in the background of the Sino-British Joint Declaration in December 1984 which determined the Chinese sovereignty of Hong Kong after 1997 and the introduction of the representative democracy by the colonial government. It was "a pseudo-political party in preparation for the coming elections for various positions in public office."

Founded by a group of labour organisations, trade unions, and church figures, the membership of the organisation was largely based on the Hong Kong Christian Industrial Committee, including Ding Lik-kiu, the chairman of the Hong Kong Christian Industrial Committee and Lau Chin-shek, as well as social activist Rev. Lo Lung Kwong.

The association aimed at raising Hong Kong people's political awareness by participating in the territory-wide elections, and to achieve a free, democratic, just society with equal opportunities.
