= White Paper on District Administration in Hong Kong =

The White Paper on District Administration in Hong Kong (《地方行政白皮書》）was a white paper published by the Hong Kong Government in January 1981 on introducing elected bodies to local administration in Hong Kong and widening the electoral franchise of the Urban Council.

== Green Paper ==
The Green Paper: A Pattern of District Administration in Hong Kong was published on 6 June 1980 for public consultations on reforming local administration in Hong Kong. The Green Paper recommended that:

On the local tier of administration:

- District Management Committees be established in each district;
- District Boards (區議會) be established in each district; and
- some members of District Boards would be returned by elections

On the mid-tier Urban Council:

- the number of appointed members in the Urban Council be increased to 15 to maintain the pre-existing ratio between appointed and elected members;
- 8 constituencies be created for the Urban Council, with 7 multi-member constituencies and 1 single-member constituency; and
- 1-2 constituencies in each district; each constituency represents 250,000

== White Paper ==
Upon the conclusion of public consultations, the White Paper: District Administration in Hong Kong was published in January 1981, stating that the government would:

- Maintain the pre-existing administrative division comprising 18 districts;
- Establish District Management Committees in each district by 1981, to be formed by government officials across departments;
- Establish District Boards in each district by March 1982 (Boards in New Territories to be established by reconstituting existing District Consultation Committees); and
- Expand Suffrage for the Urban Council

== Implementation ==
Proposals in the White Paper were implemented between 1982 and 1983, during which elections to the District Boards and Urban Council were held.

=== Expansion of Electoral Franchise ===
Before 1981, Hong Kong residents were eligible to vote in Urban Council elections only if they:

- had reached 21 years of age;
- had ordinary resided in Hong Kong for the 3 years immediately preceding the nomination; and
- were qualified in at least one of 23 categories, which included educational qualifications (School Certificate Examination or equivalent), be a juror, salaried taxpayer, or a member of certain professional organisations

The electoral franchise were expanded to around 568,000 voters upon implementation of the White Paper, which marked an increase by 17 times:

- minimum voting age to remain at 21;
- minimum period of ordinary residence in Hong Kong increased from 3 to 7 years;
- all residents were eligible for suffrage regardless of nationalities; and
- the 23 criteria for registering as voters in Urban Council elections abolished.

=== District Board Bill 1981 ===
The Bill provided for the formation of District Boards:

- to be composed of elected members, appointed or elected members of the Urban Council or chairmen of Rural Committees, appointed unofficial members and main official members of corresponding District Management Committees;
- to be formed by around 25-30 members, with an unofficial majority;
- to be initially chaired by officials, but chairmen to be elected among members as soon as possible; and
- with 1-2 members per constituency, elected through first-past-the-post voting or single non-transferable vote.

Upon enactment of the District Board Ordinance (Cap. 366) on 17 July 1981, elections for District Boards on Hong Kong Island and in Kowloon were held on 4 March 1982, while elections for District Boards in the New Territories were held on 23 September 1982.

=== Urban Council (Amendment) Bill 1981 ===
The Bill provided for the expansion of electoral franchise and creation of constituencies to the Urban Council election on 8 March 1983:

- number of elected and appointed UC members increased from 12 to 15 members each;
- 15 single-member constituencies created (each of 250,000 population), elected through first-past-the-post voting; and
- the term of UC members elected in 1981 shortened to 2 years to accommodate Urban Council elections under the reformed electoral methods in 1983.

== See also ==
- District Councils of Hong Kong
- Urban Council
- 1982 Hong Kong local elections
- 1983 Hong Kong municipal election
