= Meeting Point =

Meeting Point 匯點
- Chairman: Lau Nai-keung; Yeung Sum; Anthony Cheung
- Founded: 9 January 1983
- Dissolved: 2 October 1994
- Merged into: Democratic Party
- Ideology: Liberalism (HK); Chinese nationalism
- Regional affiliation: Pro-democracy camp
- Colours: Green

Meeting Point
- Traditional Chinese: 匯點
Transcriptions
Yue: Cantonese
- Jyutping: Wui^{6}dim^{2}

Meeting Point (Chinese: 匯點) was a liberal and moderate Chinese nationalist political organisation and party in Hong Kong formed by a group of former student activists in the 1970s and intellectuals for the discussion for the Sino-British negotiation on the question of Hong Kong prospect in 1983. It was one of the earliest groups in Hong Kong that favoured Chinese sovereignty over Hong Kong but wanted a free, democratic and autonomous Hong Kong.

It emerged as one of the leading pro-democracy groups in the 1980s and was one of the two predecessors of today's Democratic Party, into which it was merged in 1994.

== History ==
=== Sino-British agreement ===
It was founded on 9 January 1983 by a group of former student activists active in the 1970s and intellectuals, many of which were graduates of the University of Hong Kong. With Lau Nai-keung the founding Chairman and Yeung Sum the Vice-Chairman, the group stressed the autonomous government of "Hong Kong people ruling Hong Kong" under the Chinese sovereignty in the midst of the Sino-British negotiations over Hong Kong sovereignty after 1997, which was a minor opinion at the time the mainstream opinion overwhelmingly supported British rule. Its support for peaceful reunification with China attracted Beijing's support.

In the post-agreement period, the group started participating in the municipal and local elections. It formed a strategic alliance with the two major pro-democratic groups, the Association for Democracy and People's Livelihood (ADPL) and the Hong Kong Affairs Society (HKAS). Together with other liberal organisations, it also called for introduction of direct election and an accountable government. It joined the Joint Committee on the Promotion of Democratic Government (JGPDG) for the direct election in 1988 for the Legislative Council of Hong Kong. During the period, the Meeting Point remained its warm relationship with Beijing. In 1987, Chairman Lau Nai-keung was appointed to the Chinese People’s Political Consultative Conference by Beijing.

=== 1991 LegCo elections and 1994 reform proposals ===
The Tiananmen Square crackdown in June 1989, which the Hong Kong liberals strongly supported the student protestors and opposed to the crackdown, worsened the group's relationship with Beijing. In April 1990, the members of the Meeting Point as well as the ADPL and HKAS formed a new party, the United Democrats of Hong Kong led by Martin Lee, who was seen as "treason" by Beijing at that time, in the preparation for the 1991 first direct election for the Legislative Council of Hong Kong. The Meeting Point won a historical landslide victory with the United Democrats, with Fred Li Wah-ming and Tik Chi-yuen winning 2 seats in the geographical constituencies. It gained an extra seat in a by-election in 1991 with Zachary Wong Wai-yin won in the New Territories West constituency. It formally converted to a political party on 13 September 1992 with about 150 old members reaffirming their commitment to the party. Contrast to the United Democrats, the Meeting Point remained a more pragmatic stance and harmonious relationship with the Beijing government. In 1992, Edward Leong Che-hung of the Medical constituency joined the Meeting Point with some members of Leong's Hong Kong Democratic Foundation.

In 1994, the Meeting Point supported the electoral reform proposals carried out by the last Governor Chris Patten which were strongly opposed by the Beijing government. It caused an internal split within the Meeting Point which founding members including Lau Nai-keung, Tsang Shu-ki and Wong Chack-kie quit the party after the general meeting voted in favour of Patten's proposals. The Meeting Point later abstained in the amendment for a fully elected legislature moved by Emily Lau Wai-hing as it thought any infringement of the Basic Law would further enrage Beijing result in instability and the dismantling of the installed political structure.

=== Merge into Democratic Party ===
Due to lack of effectiveness of the moderate approach and to further unite the pro-democracy camp for the 1995 Legislative Council elections, the Meeting Point and the United Democrats led by Anthony Cheung Bing-leung and Martin Lee merged into a new party, the Democratic Party, announced in April 1994. The two former Chairmen of the Meeting Point, Yeung Sum and Anthony Cheung became the two Vice-Chairmen of the new party and Andrew Fung Wai-kwong was the Treasurer. Anthony Cheung's appointment of the Hong Kong Affairs Adviser by Beijing was cancelled after the two party merged. The party's general meeting passed the motion of establishing the Democratic Party on 15 May 1994. It was officially dissolved in October 1994.

The Meeting Point members became a main faction in the Democratic Party with a more pro-middle class, pro-market and moderate agenda. It also stressed dialogue with Beijing and Hong Kong governments over struggle, and parliamentary politics over street action. In the 1998 leadership election, the "Young Turks" faction staged a successful coup d'état, nominating Lau Chin-shek to defeat Anthony Cheung as Vice-Chairman. Anthony Cheung later quit the party in 2005 and established the think tank SynergyNet. He later joined the government as the Secretary for Transport and Housing in 2012.

== List of chairmen ==
1. Lau Nai-keung, 1983–1988
2. Yeung Sum, 1988–1989
3. Anthony Cheung, 1989–1994

== Notable members ==
- Chan Choi-hi
- Andrew Fung
- Edward Leong
- Andrew Cheng
- Lai Chak-fun
- Fred Li
- Ip Kwok-him
- Lui Tak-lok
- Ng Ming-yum
- Tsang Shu-ki
- Tik Chi-yuen
- Wong Chack-kie
- Zachary Wong

== Electoral performance ==
=== Legislative Council elections ===
Election	Number of popular votes	% of popular votes	GC seats	FC seats	EC seats	Total seats	+/−
1991	98,588	7.20	2	0	-	2 / 60	2▲

Note: Each voter got two votes in the 1991 Election.

=== Municipal elections ===
Election	Number of popular votes	% of popular votes	UrbCo seats	RegCo seats	Total elected seats
1986	35,411	10.06	1 / 15	1 / 12	2 / 27
1989	21,702▼	10.21▲	0 / 15	2 / 12	2 / 27
1991	12,476▼	3.18▼	1 / 15	0 / 12	1 / 27

=== District Board elections ===
Election	Number of popular votes	% of popular votes	Total elected seats	+/−
1985	9,714	1.41	4 / 237	4▲
1988	41,878▲	6.57▲	16 / 264	12▲
1991	18,386▼	3.46▼	11 / 272	2▲
