= Hong Kong local elections =

The Hong Kong local elections (Chinese: 區議會選舉) are elections in Hong Kong for the members of District Councils (known as District Boards before 2000). First held in 1982, the elections are held at 4-year intervals. The last election was held on 10 December 2023. Most of district councilors were elected by general citizen on or before 2019. However, after 2023 local elections reform, general citizens can be only elect 88 seats out of 470 directly.

== Background ==
The Green Paper: A Pattern of District Administration in Hong Kong was published on 6 June 1980 for public consultations on reforming local administration in Hong Kong. The Green Paper recommended that: District Boards (區議會) be established in each district with some members of District Boards be returned by elections.

Upon the conclusion of public consultations, the White Paper: District Administration in Hong Kong in Hong Kong was published in January 1981 affirming the Government's commitment to establish District Boards in each district by March 1982. District Boards in New Territories were to be established by reconstituting existing District Consultation Committees. The Government subsequently enacted the District Board Ordinance (Cap. 366) to provide for the formation of District Boards:

- to be composed of elected members, appointed or elected members of the Urban Council or chairmen of Rural Committees, appointed unofficial members and main official members of corresponding District Management Committees;
- to be formed by around 25-30 members, with an unofficial majority;
- to be initially chaired by officials, but chairmen to be elected among members as soon as possible; and
- with 1-2 members per constituency, elected through first-past-the-post voting or single non-transferable vote.

The first elections for District Boards on Hong Kong Island and in Kowloon were held on 4 March 1982, while elections for District Boards in the New Territories were held on 23 September 1982.

== Electoral System ==
The elections are conducted by simple plurality since 1982, with each constituency having an average population of around 17,000 people. Changes to the composition and electoral system of elected District Council members are outlined as follows:

Election	Voting system	Total number of elected seats	District magnitude
1982	first-past-the-post voting / single non-transferable vote	132 seats	1-2 seats
1985	first-past-the-post voting / single non-transferable vote	237 seats	1-2 seats
1988	first-past-the-post voting / single non-transferable vote	264 seats	1-2 seats
1991	first-past-the-post voting / single non-transferable vote	274 seats	1-2 seats
1994	first-past-the-post voting	346 seats	1 seat
1999	first-past-the-post voting	390 seats	1 seat
2003	first-past-the-post voting	400 seats	1 seat
2007	first-past-the-post voting	405 seats	1 seat
2011	first-past-the-post voting	412 seats	1 seat
2015	first-past-the-post voting	431 seats	1 seat
2019	first-past-the-post voting	452 seats	1 seat
2023	first-past-the-post voting	88 seats (Directly elected); 176 seats (Indirectly elected); 179 appointed 27 Ex-officio	

== Electoral Results ==
District Council elections
Election	Largest faction in elected seats	Composition of elected seats (by alignment)	% of popular vote won by the largest faction in elected seats	Turnout
1994	Pro-Beijing camp	146:4:196	54.12%	33.14%
1999	Pro-Beijing camp	157:1:232	54.69%	35.82%
2003	Pro-Beijing camp	198:1:201	46.48%	44.10%
2007	Pro-Beijing camp	127:2:276	53.98%	38.83%
2011	Pro-Beijing camp	103:8:301	55.42%	41.49%
2015	Pro-Beijing camp	126:7:298	54.61%	47.01%
2019	Pro-democracy camp	388:2:62	57.09%	71.23%
2023	Pro-Beijing camp	470	100%	27.54%

== Division of Districts and Constituencies ==
A total of 18 District Councils were established, each with 11 to 37 elected members depending on the respective population. Historically, there were 19 District Councils but Mong Kok District Council was merged with the Yau Tsim District Council to form the Yau Tsim Mong District Council, named after a neologism that incorporates words from three major areas of the district into its name.

Existing District Councils are listed as follows:

Hong Kong Island

- Central & Western District
- Eastern District
- Southern District
- Wan Chai District

Kowloon (including New Kowloon)

- Kowloon City District
- Kwun Tong District
- Sham Shui Po District
- Wong Tai Sin District
- Yau Tsim Mong District

New Territories (excluding New Kowloon)

- Islands District
- Kwai Tsing District
- North District
- Sai Kung District
- Sha Tin District
- Tai Po District
- Tsuen Wan District
- Tuen Mun District
- Yuen Long District

== Nominations ==
Lists for parties and for individuals may be nominated during a two-week nomination period ending five weeks before polling day.

=== Candidacy requirement ===
Candidates have to fulfill the following requirements:

- has reached 21 years of age;
- is a permanent resident of Hong Kong;
- is registered and eligible for registration as an elector for geographical constituencies;
- has ordinary resided in Hong Kong for the 3 years immediately preceding the nomination; and
- does not hold office as the chairman of a Rural Committee
