= 1985 Hong Kong local elections =

- 7 March 1985

All Elected Constituencies 237 (of the 426) seats in all 19 District Boards
- Registered: 1,421,391 ▲58.01%
- Turnout: 476,558 (37.48%) ▼1.45pp
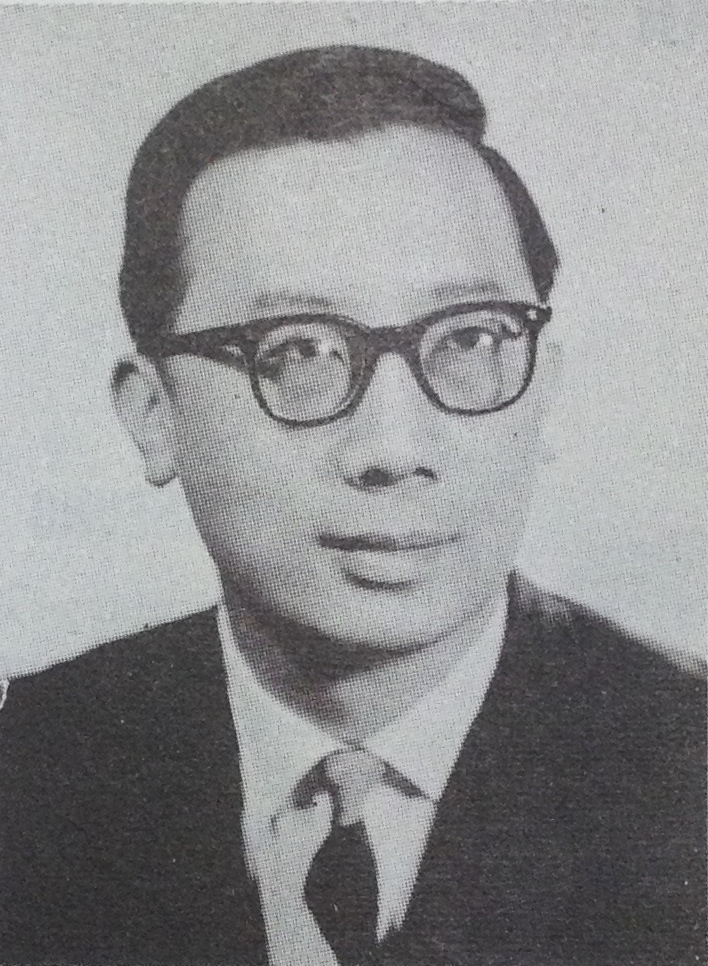

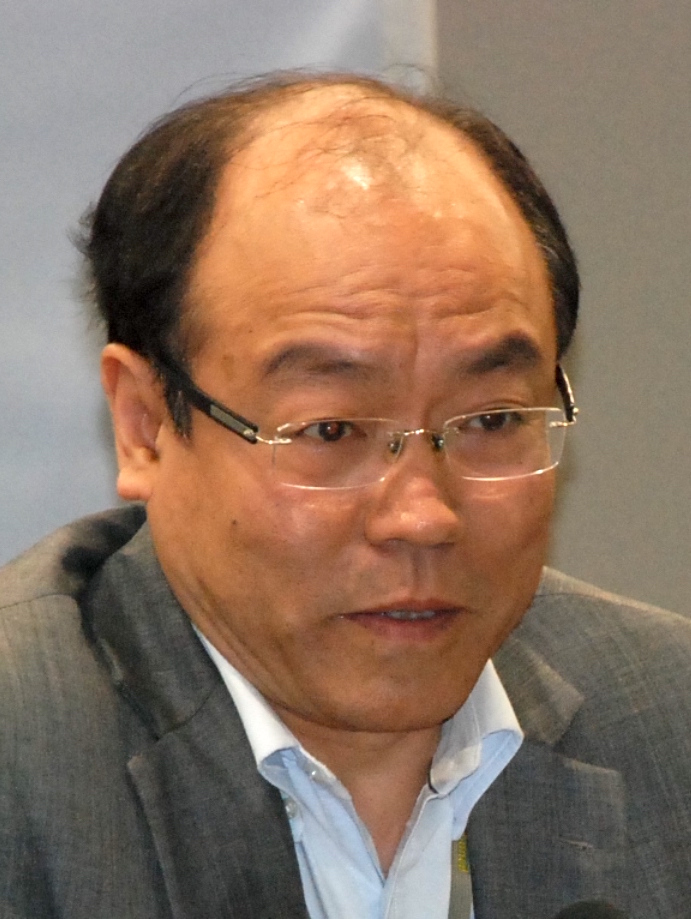

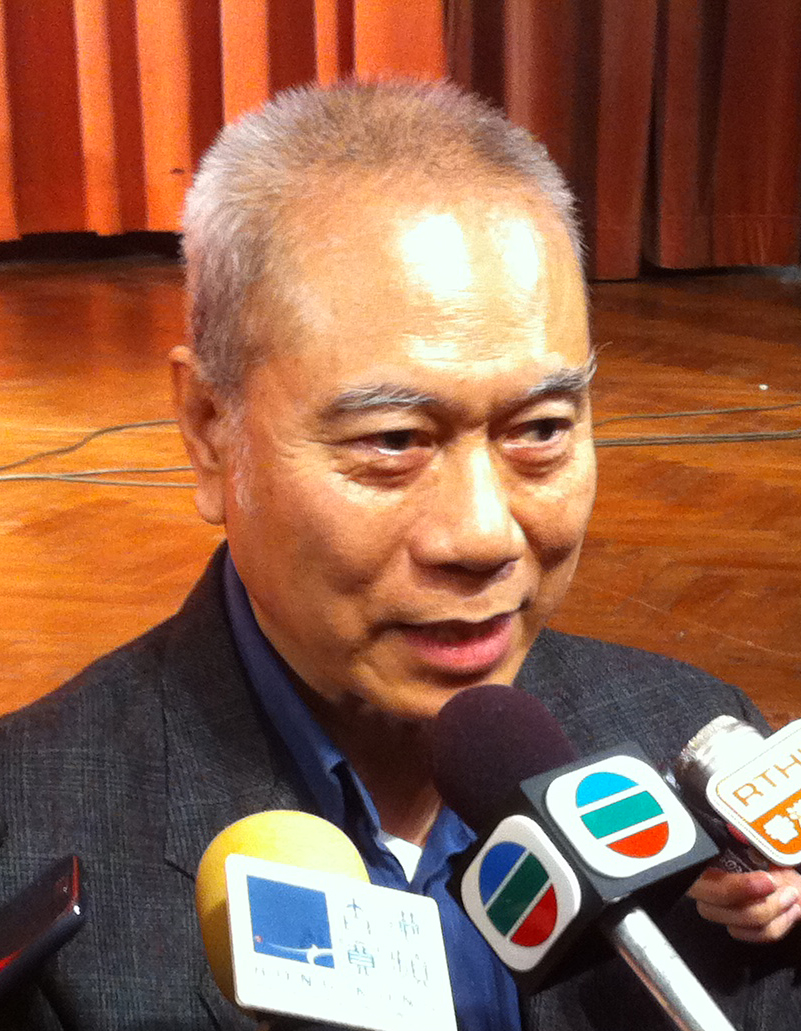

	First party	Second party	Third party
Leader	Hilton Cheong-Leen	Brook Bernacchi	Frederick Fung
Party	Civic	Reform	PCPHP
Last election	6 seats, 7.46%	4 seats, 6.42%	New party
Seats won	17	17	8
Popular vote	60,311	43,769	29,390
Percentage	8.76%	6.36%	4.27%
Swing	▲1.30pp	▼0.06pp	N/A
	Fourth party	Fifth party	Sixth party
Leader	Lo King-man	Lau Nai-keung	Huang Chen-ya
Party	People's Association	Meeting Point	HKAS
Last election	New party	New party	New party
Seats won	8	4	3
Popular vote	18,040	9,714	4,148
Percentage	2.62%	1.41%	0.60%
Swing	N/A	N/A	N/A

The 1985 Hong Kong District Board elections were the second district board elections held on 7 March 1985 for the all 19 districts of Hong Kong (original Tsuen Wan District Board was separated into Tsuen Wan District Board and Kwai Tsing District Board).

== Overview ==
The two political groups with long history, the Hong Kong Civic Association and the Reform Club of Hong Kong continued to fill candidates in various districts. The Reform Club focused on its base in the Eastern District and both groups focused their campaigns in the urban areas. The relatively new grassroots group, the Hong Kong People's Council on Public Housing Policy which mainly focused on the public housing policies also actively fill in candidates. The incumbent District Councillors in the Central and Western District, Eastern District and the Southern District on the Hong Kong Island formed the coalition of seeking for re-election. Most of the members retained their seats.

The pro-Beijing leftist union Hong Kong Federation of Trade Unions (FTU) also supported ten of its members who all ran as individuals and five of them were elected, while five elected candidates were with pro-Taipei background, one of whom was a member of the Hong Kong and Kowloon Trades Union Council (TUC). The Hong Kong Professional Teachers' Union (PTU) also supported 30 of its members, 24 of whom were elected.

== General outcome ==
Total of 476,530 voters cast their votes on the election day on 7 March, which was about 37.5% of the total eligible voters, slightly higher than the last election.

Overall Summary of the 7 March 1985 District Board election results
Political Affiliation	Votes	%	Standing	Elected
Hong Kong Civic Association	60,311	8.76	44	17
Reform Club of Hong Kong	43,769	6.36	35	17
Eastern District Coalition	28,495	4.14	12	10
Central and Western District Coalition	19,703	2.86	12	10
Hong Kong People's Council on Public Housing Policy	29,390	4.27	10	8
Hong Kong People's Association	18,040	2.62	8	8
Southern District Coalition	9,570	1.39	10	6
Meeting Point	9,714	1.41	4	4
Hong Kong Affairs Society	4,148	0.60	3	3
Independent and others	508,313	73.81	385	170
Total (turnout 37.5%)	688,676	100.00	501	237

Note: The votes of candidates with multiple affiliations are overlapped in this table.
