= Augustine Chung =

Hong Kong solicitor and politician

Augustine Chung Shai-kit (Chinese: 鍾世傑) was a Hong Kong solicitor and politician. He was an elected member of the Urban Council of Hong Kong and appointed member of the Wong Tai Sin District Board.

Chung graduated from the University of Hong Kong with a degree in sociology. He worked in the Social Welfare Department for two years before he interned in a law firm and subsequently became a lawyer. He specialised in the transport-related lawsuits and sued the government for the cancellation of the licences of the New Territories taxis and minibuses. He was also a host of the RTHK talk show Viewpoint alongside Andrew Wong, in which they took turns hosting the show on TVB.

In 1975, Chung was charged of blackmailing another lawyer Donald Quintin Cheung for a half a million U.S. dollars in order to avoid prosecution over the investigations into the affairs of the Paul Lee Engineering Co. Ltd.. Although he was eventually found innocent, his name was struck off the Roll of Solicitors by the Disciplinary Committee of the Council of the Law Society of Hong Kong. He applied to restore his name on the Roll in 1988 but lost the case. He wrote a book System of Prey based on his experience.

Chung ran in the 1979 Urban Council election and was elected with 4,136 votes. He was re-elected in the 1983 Urban Council election and served in the council until 1986. During his membership of the Urban Council, he served as a chairman of one of its select committees, a vice-chairman of two of its other select committees and a member of six other select committees. From 1981 to 1986, he served as an appointed member of the Wong Tai Sin District Board.

Political offices
Preceded by Wong Pun-cheuk	Member of the Urban Council; 1979–1986	Succeeded by Fok Pui-yee
