= Lam Chak-piu =

Lam Chak-piu (Chinese: 林澤飄; born 1932) is a former Hong Kong activist and politician. He is also a former member of the Urban Council of Hong Kong.

Lam was born in Weizhou, Guangdong in 1932 and became a teacher in 1958. He smuggled to Hong Kong in 1960, during the Great Famine of China. He first worked at a plastic factory and later worked at a textile factory, repairing sewing machines. He lived in the squatter area and temporary settlement area before he married and had two sons and two daughters.

He first joined a local kaifong association in Kowloon Bay in 1978 and joined the Hong Kong People's Council on Public Housing Policy in 1979 and later became chairman of the Society for Community Organization. He ran for the first reformed Urban Council election in 1983, receiving more than 14,000 votes and defeated two candidates with university graduate background. He was re-elected in 1986 and 1989. He did not seek for his fourth term in 1991.

He moved to Mainland China and worked in property market in the 1990s but returned to Hong Kong after his business went down in 2000. He worked in the factory and lived upon the Comprehensive Social Security Assistance after he divorced his wife who had mental issues.

On 2 January 2006, he was robbed and left with only HK$37 in his pocket.

Political offices
New seat	Member of the Urban Council; 1983–1991	Succeeded by Li Wah-ming
