= Fok Pui-yee =

Fok Pui-yee (Chinese: 霍佩儀; born 1950) is a former Hong Kong pro-democracy activist and politician. She is also a former member of the Urban Council of Hong Kong.

Fok was born and raised in Hong Kong and graduate from the Jockey Club Industrial School. She began in the community services in 1973 and was the Residents' Committee chairwoman of the Kowloon Bay Resettlement Estate. In 1979, she co-founded the Hong Kong People's Council on Public Housing Policy with other grassroots activists such as Frederick Fung and was the treasurer, secretary and vice-chairwoman of the council. She was first elected to the Urban Council in 1986. She was a member of the Joint Committee on the Promotion of Democratic Government (JCPDG) and protested with other pro-democracy politicians in a hunger strike against the "mainstream proposal" of the drafting of the Basic Law of Hong Kong. In 1989, she ran in the re-election but was defeated by Mok Ying-fan supported by the Hong Kong Association for Democracy and People's Livelihood (ADPL), becoming the only incumbent to lose her seat.

She ran in the first SAR Legislative Council election in 1998 in Kowloon East against the Democratic Party and the Democratic Alliance for the Betterment of Hong Kong (DAB). She received 6,339 votes, 2.42 percent of the total votes and was not elected. She again ran in the first SAR District Council election in 1999 in Tsz Wan East but lost to the former Legislative Councillor Michael Cheng who represented the Hong Kong Progressive Alliance (HKPA).

Political offices
Preceded by Augustine Chung	Member of the Urban Council; Representative for Wong Tai Sin South; 1986–1989	Succeeded by Mok Ying-fan
