= Lee Chik-yuet =

Hong Kong politician and businessman

Lee Chik-yuet (Chinese: 李植悅; born 20 May 1954) is a Hong Kong social worker, lawyer, politician and businessman. He is the former member of the Urban Council of Hong Kong and member of the Sham Shui Po District Board.

He was one of the first social workers to participate in politics in Hong Kong. The design of his 1983 campaign poster and slogan was considered revolutionary. He ended up winning the 1983 Urban Council elections and again in 1986 by large margins, representing the democratic movement at the time.

== Early life ==
Lee was born on 20 May 1954 in Shantou, Guangzhou and moved to Hong Kong in 1961 during the Great Famine of China. He graduated from the Shau Kei Wan Government Secondary School and attended the United College, Chinese University of Hong Kong in 1975. He was involved in student activism at the time, including the editorial works at the student newspaper, Chinese University Student Press. He was under influence of Tsang Shu-ki, the prominent theorist of the "social action faction" at the time who introduced him New Left, existentialist and Frankfurt School theories.

== Career ==
=== 1980s: Democratic leader ===
After graduating in 1979 with a bachelor's degree in Social Science, Lee began his career as a social worker at the Hong Kong Christian Social Service, serving at Lei Cheng Uk Estate in Sham Shui Po. He first contested in the first reformed Urban Council election in 1983 alongside Frederick Fung. His greyscale campaign poster featured only his back, under the slogan "The Time for Reform Has Come" (改革的時候到了). That same year, he became a member of Meeting Point, the first political group to publicly support Chinese sovereignty of Hong Kong after 1997. Although Meeting Point was co-founded by Tsang Shu-ki, Tsang later left the group in 1993 in opposition to its mainstream support for Governor Chris Patten's political reform proposals.

In 1984, Lee visited the United States. This visit shaped his decision to study law. During the trip, a legislator told him that about 65 percent of lawmakers had legal backgrounds, explaining that legislatures are fundamentally lawmaking bodies and that, in Western societies, core social policies are ultimately expressed through legislation.At the time, he originally aimed to move up to the Legislative Council, but the timing was awkward: in 1991 he was still a trainee solicitor. As a result, he encouraged James To—who had already been practising for four years—to stand for election instead.He was also apprenticing under Ronald Arculli.

Drawing on international democratic movements, Lee and Fung used their positions on the Urban Council to advocate for public participation and social reform. They established ward offices, hired full-time staff, and built grassroots networks among students, local residents, and social workers—an approach that later became a model for Hong Kong's democratic parties. Lee would later describe the 1980s as a "democratic enlightenment era" (民主啟蒙).

He was re-elected to Urban Council in 1986 and did not seek re-election in 1989. He was also vice-chairman of Meeting Point under the chairmanship of Anthony Cheung. He supported Chris Patten's constitutional reform proposal which split in the party in half. In 1994, he became member of the first executive committee of the Democratic Party when the new party was founded as a merger of the United Democrats of Hong Kong and Meeting Point.

=== Later: Leaving politics ===
Since the late 1980s, Lee gradually withdrew from politics, retrained as a lawyer, and later moved into the private sector, where he described himself as a "deserter from the democratic movement" (民主逃兵). He later recalled after the 1985 LegCo election, figures such as Martin Lee and Szeto Wah came to dominate the pro-democracy camp, eclipsing earlier leaders like himself and Frederick Fung. In his view, their prominence made it clear that he would at best play a secondary role, and that his own historical contribution had largely been confined to the movement’s early "enlightenment" phase in the early 1980s. Lee also cited personal and family considerations, as well as uncertainty about his future, in his decision. Having worked hard to obtain a law degree, and encouraged by opportunities to engage in legal work related to China, he chose to leave politics.

In 1990 and 1994, Lee graduated with a bachelor's degree and master's degree in laws from the University of Hong Kong respectively. He provided legal consultations to various Chinese and Hong Kong companies. He is currently an executive director of the New Ray Medicine International Holding Limited and the Town Health International Medical Group Limited.

== In media ==
- War of Positions, a 1983 documentary about the 1983 Urban Council election featuring Frederick Fung and Lee.

== See also ==
- Democracy in Hong Kong
- 1970s Hong Kong student protests

Political offices
New seat	Member of the Urban Council; 1983–1989	Succeeded by Ma Lee-wo
