= Ng Ming-yum =

Hong Kong politician and writer

- 吳明欽

Member of the Legislative Council
- In office 9 October 1991 – 22 June 1992
- Succeeded by: Tang Siu-tong
- Constituency: New Territories West

Member of the Regional Council
- In office 1 April 1986 – 22 June 1992
- Succeeded by: Yim Tin-sang

Member of the Tuen Mun District Board
- In office 1 April 1985 – 22 June 1992
- Succeeded by: Ho Hang-mui

Personal details
- Born: 13 April 1955 Hong Kong
- Died: 22 June 1992 (aged 37) Hong Kong
- Party: Meeting Point; United Democrats
- Occupation: Politician

Ng Ming-yum (Chinese: 吳明欽; 13 April 1955 – 22 June 1992) was a Hong Kong politician and writer. He was a key founder of the United Democrats of Hong Kong (forerunner of the Democratic Party), a member of the Tuen Mun District Council, an elected member of the Regional Council and the youngest member of the Legislative Council to die in office. He supported the Tiananmen Square protesters in 1989, and is remembered for carrying a flag, leading a supporting crowd during the related protest in Hong Kong.

A writer for Breakthrough Magazine (Chinese: 突破; a Christian magazine published in Hong Kong from 1973 to 1999), Lee Wing-Tat was an ally of Ng inside the party and carried his portrait at his funeral. He would later become Democratic Party chairman.

== Political career ==
Ng was a secondary school teacher and took an active role in community affairs. In 1971, he joined a demonstration asserting China's territorial rights over the Diaoyutai Islands. He was also active in the "Anti-corruption, Arrest Godber" movement in 1973. In the 1980s, he was deeply involved in the Meeting Point pressure group, and represented the group to win a seat on Tuen Mun District Council in 1985, securing the most votes in the territory. He went on to be re-elected with high votes in 1988 and 1991. In 1991, he won a seat on the Legislative Council.

=== 1985 attack incident ===
On 11 October 1985, while going to greet residents in Tuen Mun, he was savagely attacked with knives and metal pipes, hospitalising him for eight days. Of the assailants - thought to have been hired thugs, five were arrested and two went to prison. It was the first time a pro-democracy district councillor had been assaulted and generated widespread concern in Hong Kong. It also led to Ng gaining 70 percent of the votes in his district against the pro-Beijingers in the Regional Council Election in 1986.

=== Legislative Councillor ===
He united many students and teachers to support the Tiananmen Square protesters in Beijing and was part of the Hong Kong Alliance in Support of Patriotic Democratic Movements in China, becoming a central committee member of the United Democrats of Hong Kong when it was formed in 1991.

Ng was elected as a member of the Legislative Council (LegCo) in 1991, and was noted for his hard work during his short term. He strongly opposed proposed cuts in education expenditure and the number of classes in schools. In this cause he helped bring together the Education functional constituency for a candlelit vigil around the LegCo to pressure on the government. Although pro-Beijing members and some pro-London members voted in favour of the proposal, this plan was finally cancelled in 1993.

== Illness and death ==
Ng was diagnosed with blood cancer in February 1992, but continued to work long hours, even making policy proposals from his hospital bed. Despite his deteriorating health, on 4 June 1992 he attended a candlelight vigil in memory of the people who was killed during the Tiananmen massacre three years earlier.

A few weeks later, during a fundraising campaign on 22 June 1992, he fainted and died. LegCo members observed a moment of silence before the legislature sat in his memory two days later. He was the only LegCo member ever to receive this honour. He was survived by his wife, a son and a daughter.

In the LegCo by-election that followed Ng's death, his colleague Albert Ho, later chairman of the Democratic Party, stood but failed to win, later recognising that he lacked Ng's close ties to the area. He nevertheless took on the office and staff that Ng had run, and went to represent the area in Legco and on Tuen Mun District Council.

== Publications ==
- 燃點此生 (1992), published by Breakthrough
- 昨天的努力，明天的見證 (1992), published by Breakthrough

Political offices
New constituency	Member of Tuen Mun District Board; Representative for Tai Hing; 1985–1992	Succeeded by Ho Hang-mui
New title	Member of Regional Council; Representative for Tuen Mun West; 1986–1992	Succeeded by Yim Tin-sang
Legislative Council of Hong Kong
New constituency	Member of Legislative Council; Representative for New Territories West; 1991–1992	Succeeded by Tang Siu-tong
