= Article 46 =

Clause of the Hong Kong Basic Law

Article 46 is an article of the Hong Kong Basic Law. The article sets the term of the Chief Executive of Hong Kong.

== Content ==
Article 46 of the Hong Kong Basic Law states:

The term of office of the Chief Executive of the Hong Kong Special Administrative Region shall be five years. He or she may serve for not more than two consecutive terms.

== Interpretation of Article 46 ==
Article 53 of the Basic Law stipulates that a new Chief Executive shall be selected within six months in accordance with the provisions of Article 45 of this Law. Interpretation of the term of the Chief Executive became a part of a legal dispute in 2005 after the resignation of then-Hong Kong Chief Executive, Tung Chee-Hwa. The question arose as to whether his successor would serve a full five-year term or would only serve the remainder of Tung's term. Those who supported him for a full five-year term, which included much of the Hong Kong legal community, argued that this is the literal reading of the article. But those who argued for a partial term argued that a partial term was the clear legislative intent of the article, as filling a partial term is the practice within the People's Republic of China.

The difference was in part due to different legal traditions. Although later modified by the Fixed-term Parliaments Act 2011, at the time of the controversy in 2005, the British Westminster system did not run elections according to fixed schedules, whereas the People's Republic of China tends to have terms and elections according to fixed schedules, similar to the practice of the United States.

The Standing Committee of the National People's Congress issued its third interpretation of the Basic Law on 27 April 2005, stipulating that in the event of a vacancy arising before the outgoing Chief Executive has served a full term of office of five years under Article 46, the term of office of the new Chief Executive shall be the remainder of that of the outgoing Chief Executive.

== Resignation and Impeachment ==
Notwithstanding provisions in Article 46, the Chief Executive must vacate the office before the conclusion of his or her term, if he or she is forced to resign or impeached.

=== Resignation ===
Article 52 of the Basic Law stipulates that the chief executive must resign when:

- the Chief Executive (CE) loses the ability to discharge his or her duties as a result of serious illness or other reasons;
- the Chief Executive refuses to sign a bill passed by a two-thirds majority of a re-elected Legislative Council (LegCo), after the Legislative Council is dissolved; or
- the Legislative Council refuses to pass the budget or any other important bill.

Dissolution of LegCo and Forced Resignation of CE
CE refuses to promulgate a bill passed by LegCo, and returns the bill to LegCo within 3 months for reconsideration (Art. 49, Basic Law)		LegCo refuses to pass the budget or any other important bill (Art. 51, Basic Law)
↓		LegCo refuses to pass the budget or any other important bill (Art. 51, Basic Law)
Maintenance of the original bill by a two-thirds majority of all LegCo members (Art. 50, Basic Law)		LegCo refuses to pass the budget or any other important bill (Art. 51, Basic Law)
↓		LegCo refuses to pass the budget or any other important bill (Art. 51, Basic Law)
↓	CE refuses to promulgate the bill passed the second time by LegCo(Art. 50, Basic Law)	LegCo refuses to pass the budget or any other important bill (Art. 51, Basic Law)
↓	↓	
↓	Dissolution of the Legislative Council by the CE after consultations with the Executive Council, if consensus still cannot be reached after consultations (Art. 51, Basic Law)	
↓	↓	
↓	The re-elected LegCo passes the original bill by a two-thirds majority of all members (Art.52, Basic Law)	The re-elected LegCo refuses to pass the budget or any other important bill (Art.52, Basic Law)
↓		The re-elected LegCo refuses to pass the budget or any other important bill (Art.52, Basic Law)
CE signs and promulgates the original bill within one month (Art.50, Basic Law)	CE still refuses to sign and promulgate the original bill (Art.51, Basic Law)	The re-elected LegCo refuses to pass the budget or any other important bill (Art.52, Basic Law)
CE signs and promulgates the original bill within one month (Art.50, Basic Law)	↓	
CE signs and promulgates the original bill within one month (Art.50, Basic Law)	the Chief Executive must resign (Art. 52, Basic Law)	

A member of the Basic Law Consultation Committee argued that a further sub-provision reading "a vote of non-confidence against the Chief Executive endorsed by a two-thirds majority of the members of the legislature" should be added to Article 52. However, the proposed provision also proposed that the Chief Executive could dissolve the legislature if the legislature case a vote of the non-confidence against him, but the Chief Executive would have to resign if the newly elected legislature again cast a vote of non-confidence against him. The argument was not adopted.

=== Impeachment ===
The Legislative Council has the power to initiate the impeachment of the Chief Executive under article 73(9) of the Basic Law:

Impeachment of CE
Motion initiated jointly by one-fourth of all LegCo members, charging the CE with serious breach of law or dereliction of duty but refuses to resign
↓
Motion for investigation passed by simple majority of votes of each of the two groups of members present
↓
LegCo mandates the Chief Justice to form and chair an independent investigation committee for carrying out the investigation and reporting its findings to LegCo
↓
The committee considers the evidence sufficient to substantiate such charges
↓
Motion of impeachment passed by a two-thirds majority of all LegCo members
↓
LegCo reports motion of impeachment to the Central People's Government for decision

== See also ==
- Hong Kong Basic Law
- Chief Executive of Hong Kong
