= 1983 Hong Kong municipal election =

- 8 March 1983

15 (of the 30) seats to the Urban Council
- Registered: 708,119
- Turnout: 127,206 (22.37%)
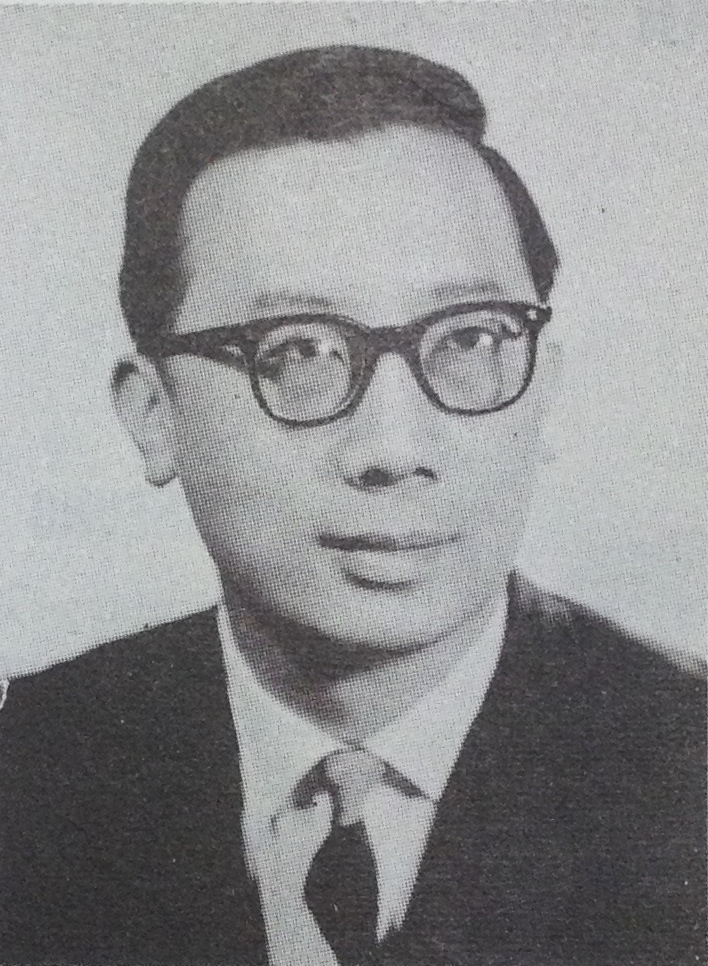

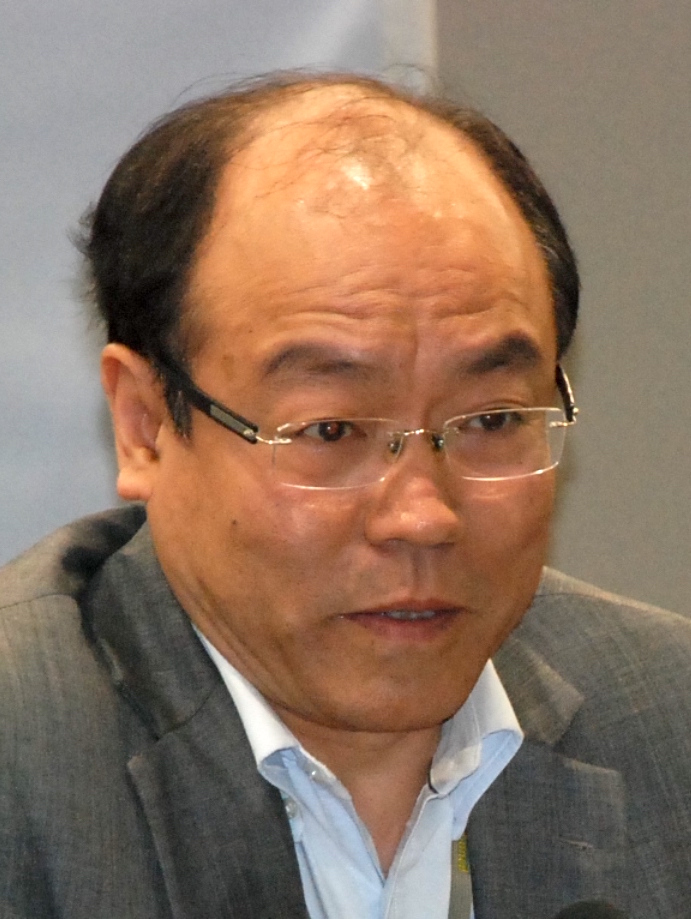
	First party	Second party	Third party
Leader	Hilton Cheong-Leen	Brook Bernacchi	Frederick Fung
Party	Civic	Reform	PCPHP
Leader's seat	Wan Chai	Shau Kei Wan	Sham Shui Po East
Last election	4 seats, 45.35%	2 seats, 28.29%	New party
Seats won	4	2	2
Seat change	Steady	▲1	▲2
Popular vote	23,576	19,520	13,894
Percentage	18.58%	15.38%	10.98%
Swing	▼26.77pp	▼12.91pp	N/A
Chairman before election
Hilton Cheong-Leen
Civic
Elected Chairman
Hilton Cheong-Leen
Civic

The 1983 Hong Kong Urban Council election was held on 8 March 1983 for the elected seats of the Urban Council. It marked the centenary of the establishment of the Urban Council and the largely reformed electoral methods with the creation of the district-based constituencies and massive expansion of the electorate.

== Overview ==
1983 marked the centenary of the Urban Council. Elections for the certain numbers of seats in the Urban Council had been held since 1888, but the electorates were strictly limited to the residents on the jurors list or with certain professions. All elected members were voted in a single constituency.

Since the colonial government began the reform on the district administrations on the eve of the Sino-British negotiation over the Hong Kong sovereignty after 1997, the 1983 election marked a major change of the Urban Council. The elected members increased from 12 to 15 whilst the appointed members increased from 12 to 15 as well, which increased the total members from 24 to 30. 15 elected members were elected by electorates of each constituency in Hong Kong Island, Kowloon and New Kowloon with single member plurality method. The electorate base was fully extended to all Hong Kong permanent residents over 21 to about 568,000 voters, which made the electorate increased by 17 times.

Despite the two long existing political groups in the Urban Council, the Hong Kong Civic Association and the Reform Club of Hong Kong, the Hong Kong People's Council on Public Housing Policy (PCPHP), a pressure group which devoted itself to the public housing policies also fill in two candidates, vice-chairman Lam Chak-piu in Kwun Tong East and secretary-general Frederick Fung in Sham Shui Po East, which made it the first pressure group to have representative in the election.

Total of 127,303, 22.4 per cent of the eligible voters turned out on the election day on 8 March, where Sham Shui Po recorded the highest turnout of 26.7 per cent and Wong Tai Sin had the second highest of 26 per cent. Eastern District which included the North Point and Shau Kei Wan constituencies recorded the lowest turnout of 20.4 per cent.

== Outcome of election ==
Political affiliation	Standing	Elected	Popular votes	%
Hong Kong Civic Association	7	4	23,576	18.58
Reform Club of Hong Kong	3	3	19,520	15.38
Hong Kong People's Council on Public Housing Policy	2	2	13,894	10.98
Individuals and others	29	6	69,900	55.09
Total (turnout: 22.4%)	41	15	126,498	100.00

== Elected members ==
District	Constituency	Candidates	Affiliation
Central & Western	Central & Western	Maria Tam Wai-chu	Independent
Wan Chai	Wan Chai	Hilton Cheong-Leen	Civic
Eastern	North Point	Kwan Lim-ho	Reform
Eastern	Shau Kei Wan	Brook Bernacchi	Reform
Southern	Southern	Joseph Chan Yuek-sut	Civic
Kowloon City	Kowloon City West	Peter Chan Chi-kwan	Civic
Kowloon City	Kowloon City East	Pao Ping-wing	Independent
Kwun Tong	Kwun Tong West	Elsie Elliott	Independent
Kwun Tong	Kwun Tong East	Lam Chak-piu	PCPHP
Mong Kok	Mong Kok	Chow Wai-hung	Civic
Yau Tsim	Yau Ma Tei	Denny Huang Mong-hwa	Independent
Sham Shui Po	Sham Shui Po East	Frederick Fung Kin-kee	PCPHP
Sham Shui Po	Sham Shui Po West	Lee Chik-yuet	Independent
Wong Tai Sin	Wong Tai Sin South	Augustine Chung Shai-kit	Independent
Wong Tai Sin	Wong Tai Sin North	Cecilia Yeung Lai-yin	Reform

== See also ==
- War of Positions, a 1983 documentary about the election
