= Gerry Forsgate =

Hugh Moss Gerald Forsgate, CBE, JP (Chinese: 霍士傑, 22 February 1919 – 21 October 2001) was a director and general manager of Hong Kong and Kowloon Wharf and Godown Company Limited, member and chairman of the Urban Council, and chairman of the Kowloon–Canton Railway Corporation.

== Biography ==
Educated in Royal High School of Edinburgh and Leith Nautical College, Forsgate served as a Merchant Navy officer during the Second World War. He was appointed to the Urban Council on 1 April 1965 and acted as its chairman from 1986 to 1991.

Forsgate served as the first chairman of Kowloon-Canton Railway Corporation (KCRC) between 1983 and 1990. His reign oversaw the company's transformation from a government body to a public enterprise based on commercial principles. Forsgate's handling of the 1988 Golden Handshake Affair, in which two senior executives were awarded HKD 5 million (later adjusted to HKD 3.75 million), drew heavy criticism from then Secretary of Transport Michael Leung and the public. KCR's EMD G16 locomotive no. 59 was named after him to commemorate his contributions to KCRC.

Forsgate married Elizabeth Stevenson Law, with whom he had one son and two daughters.
