= Joseph Chan Yuek-sut =

Joseph Chan Yuek-sut, BBS (Chinese: 陳若瑟; born 29 March 1936) is the former chairman and member of the Southern District Council and member of the Urban Council of Hong Kong.

Born on 29 March 1936, Chan studied at the Grantham College of Education, Shue Yan College, Wah Kiu College, Chinese University of Hong Kong and Chu Hai College. He was a member of the standing committee of the Hong Kong Civic Association and was first elected to the Urban Council of Hong Kong in the reformed election in 1983, on which he served until the council was abolished in 1999. He was also the principal of Aberdeen Saint Peter's Catholic Primary School. He served in Shek Pai Wan for many years, and was a member of the Southern District Board representing the area from 1982 to 2003. For his contributions, he was awarded the Bronze Bauhinia Star (BBS) in 2003.

Political offices
New title	Member of the Southern District Board; 1982–1983	Succeeded by Tse Kit-to
Preceded by Francis Chaine	Member of the Urban Council; 1983–1999	Council abolished
Preceded by Ma Yuet-har	Chairman of the Southern District Council; 2000–2003	Succeeded by Ma Yuet-har
