= Society for Community Organization =

- 香港社區組織協會
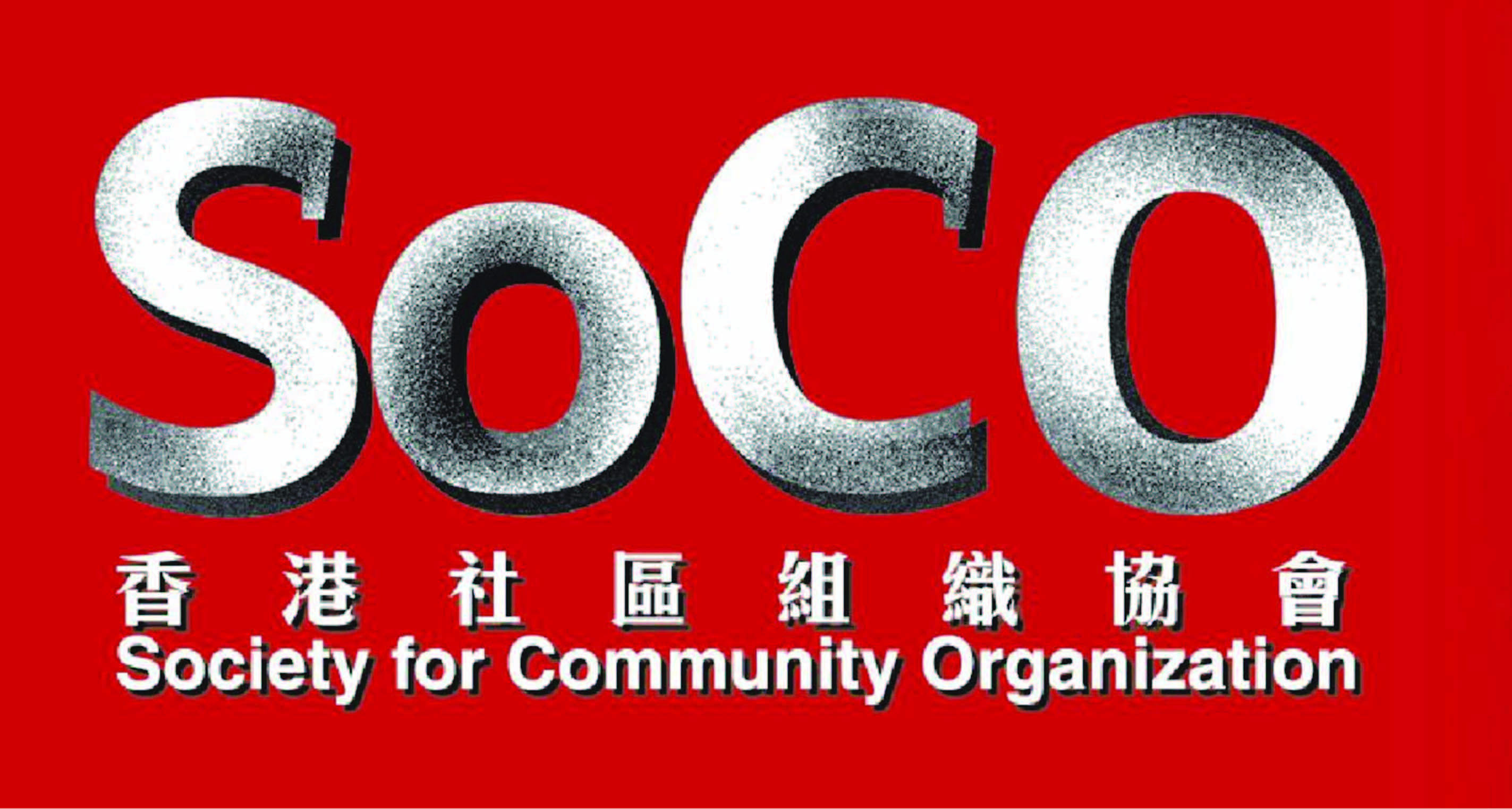
- Abbreviation: SoCO
- Formation: 1972
- Headquarters: 3/F, 52 Princess Margaret Road, Ho Man Tin, Kowloon
- Location: Hong Kong
- Website: Official website

Society for Community Organization
- Traditional Chinese: 香港社區組織協會
Transcriptions
Yue: Cantonese
- Yale Romanization: Hēung góng séh kēui jóu jīk hip wúi
- Jyutping: Heong1 gong2 se4 keoi1 zou2 zik1 hip3 wui4

The Society for Community Organization (SoCO) (Chinese: 香港社區組織協會) is a non-governmental and human rights advocacy group in Hong Kong. The group was founded in 1971 by church members. It is also financially supported by donations from various churches, overseas funding, the Community Chest and individuals. The group has organised community social actions and civic education programmes to encourage political participation by the public.

== History ==
The SoCO emerged from the Yaumatei resettlement movement in 1971–72, when the social workers campaigned for resettling the boat people in the Yaumatei typhoon shelter residents in affordable public housing. The Maryknolls and the staff of the Hong Kong Christian Industrial Committee (HKCIC) came together and founded the SoCO in 1971 to work toward addressing local, grassroots concerns by building communities and community involvement in some of Hong Kong's poorest and most industrial neighbourhoods.

== See also ==
- Human rights in Hong Kong
