= Hong Kong Christian Industrial Committee =

The Hong Kong Christian Industrial Committee (Chinese: 香港基督教工業委員會, also called as HKCIC) is a non-governmental pressure group that focuses on labor welfare policy and industrial safety. The group was founded in 1966, originally as a unit of the Hong Kong Christian Council, and became an auxiliary organization later to gain more independence. Its predecessor was the Christian Industrial Evangelism Committee, which was a study group formed in 1961.

== History ==
Historically, trade unionism in Hong Kong was split between those that supported Communist China and those supporting the Kuomintang in Taiwan. Following the 1967 Hong Kong riots, the Hong Kong Christian Industrial Committee emerged supported by churches as a replacement for both unions to support workers in need within British Hong Kong. It is associated with the Protestant churches in Hong Kong. In 1970, they led a successful campaign against a proposed raise in telephone rates. In 1990, the Hong Kong Confederation of Trade Unions was founded out of the HKCIC. Whilst still under British sovereignty before the handover of Hong Kong, the HKCIC worked in the People's Republic of China, investigating labour law and human rights abuses within the country.

Following the Hong Kong National Security Law leading to many trade unions in Hong Kong dissolving, the HKCIC continued to operate. In the 2020s, the committee predominantly worked to push for gig economy worker rights. In 2021, they created the Riders' Rights Group though whilst this self-dissolved in 2025, the HKCIC continued to campaign on this issue.

== See also ==
- Hong Kong Confederation of Trade Unions
