= Hong Kong People's Council on Housing Policy =

- 香港房屋政策評議會
- Abbreviation: HKPCHP
- Predecessor: Rental Action Group
- Established: 1978; 47 years ago
- Dissolved: 9 June 2019; 6 years ago
- Type: Pressure group
- Region served: Hong Kong
- Chairman: Cheng Ching-fat (final)

The Hong Kong People's Council on Housing Policy (Chinese: 香港房屋政策評議會; HKPCHP), formerly called the Hong Kong People's Council on Public Housing Policy (Chinese: 香港公共房屋政策評議會), was a Hong Kong pressure group established in 1978 and was prominent in the 1970s and 80s. It was set up by a group of social activists from the residents' group and community organisations aiming at influencing Hong Kong Government's public housing policies and as a shadow council of the Hong Kong Housing Authority.

The PCPHP was preceded by the Rental Action Group against the rental rise of the public housing when the Ten-Year Housing Scheme was launched and the Hong Kong Housing Authority was established in 1973. Together with the Society for Community Organisation (SOCO) and Hong Kong Christian Industrial Committee (HKCIC), they organised protests against the increase in rent of public housing in 1976, more participation in the public housing policies in 1977 and protests against the raise of bus fares in 1980. In 1983 they campaigned for curbing general rises of public utilities prices and in 1986 they protested against the construction of the Daya Bay Nuclear Plant with Hong Kong Professional Teachers' Union (HKPTU) and Hong Kong Social Workers' General Union (HKSWGU) among others.

In the mid-1980s the organisation also began to participate into the district boards and Urban Council/Regional Council elections and liaison with pro-democracy groups during elections.

It changed to its today's name in 1998, as the resettlement estates had not existed anymore. The Council disbanded on 9 June 2019 due to a lack of financial resources, marking the end of 40-year history.
