= Socialism in Hong Kong =

Socialism in Hong Kong is a political trend taking root from Marxism and Leninism which was introduced to Hong Kong in the early 1920s. Ever since the Chinese Communist Party adopted economic reforms from 1978, young socialists have moved towards the pro-democracy camp under the banner of social democracy while traditional leftists remain in the pro-Beijing camp.

Historically, socialist trends in Hong Kong have taken various forms, including Marxism–Leninism, Maoism, Trotskyism, democratic socialism and liberal socialism, with the Marxist–Leninists being the most dominant faction due to the influence of the Chinese Communist Party (CCP) regime in the mainland. The "traditional leftists" became the largest force representing the pro-Beijing camp in the post-war decades, which had an uneasy relationship with the colonial authorities.

== 1920s labour movements in Hong Kong ==
Marxism was imported to China in the early 1900s and its literature was translated from German, Russian and Japanese into Cantonese and Mandarin. Following the Russian October Revolution led by the Bolsheviks in 1917, a number of Chinese intellectuals emerged from the May Fourth Movement, which saw communism as the solution to rescue China from its present plight. The first social organisation in Hong Kong was the Marxist Research Group in 1920, formed by Lin Junwei, a school inspector of the Education Department, Zhang Rendao, a graduate from the Queen's College, and Li Yibao, a primary school teacher.

In July 1921, the Chinese Communist Party (CCP) was formally established in Shanghai. The Communist Party was modelled on Vladimir Lenin's theory of a vanguard party, and was under the guidance of the Soviet-led Comintern. The Marxist Research Group formed a connection with the CCP in Guangdong and later formed the New Chinese Students Club - Hong Kong Branch and subsequently the Chinese Socialist Youth League – Hong Kong Special Branch, under the Guangdong Socialist Youth League. In mid-1924, the CCP set up a branch in Hong Kong.

=== 1922 Seamen's strike ===
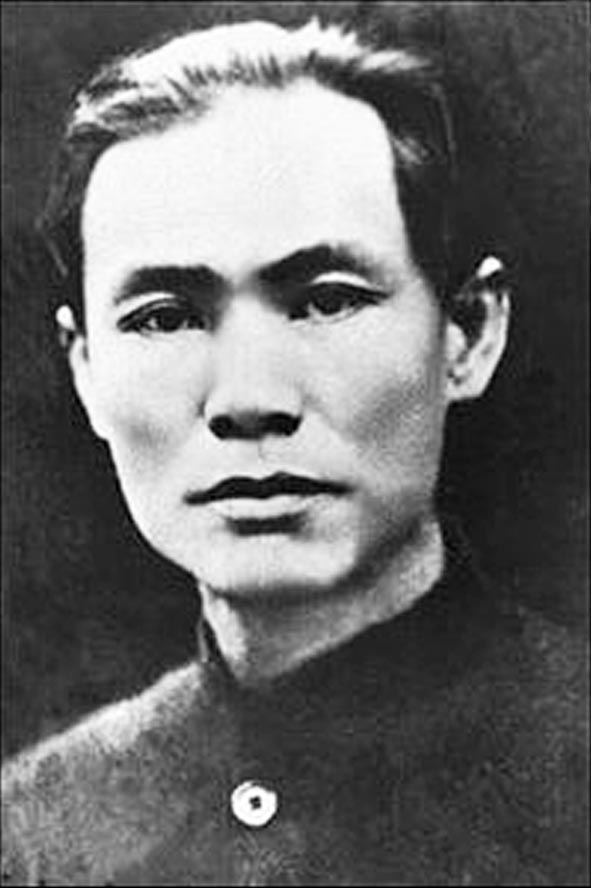
Su Zhaozheng (1885–1929), leader of the labour movement in Hong Kong who went on to become a leader of the Chinese Communist Party.

The 1922 seamen's strike became the most important episode of the labour movement in China and Hong Kong. On 13 January 1922, against the backdrop of skyrocketing prices, seamen in Hong Kong launched a well-organised strike which lasted 56 days and involved 120,000 seamen at its peak. Having received organisational and financial support from Sun Yat-sen's left-leaning Kuomintang government in Guangzhou, the Chinese Seamen's Union led the Hong Kong strikers to victory.

Although the Communists played no leadership role in the strike, some Communists in Hong Kong participated and others in the neighbouring Guangzhou made supportive speeches and published the strikers' manifesto. Su Zhaozheng and Lin Weimin, the two leaders of the seamen's strike, would later join the Communist Party. Henk Sneevliet, representative of the Comintern in China who was greatly impressed by the strike's success, concluded that the strike was "undoubtedly the most important event in the young history of the Chinese labour movement." He also held talks with Sun Yat-sen from 23 to 25 December 1921 in Guilin about possible cooperation between the Kuomintang and the Communists. Sneevliet became more actively involved in organising the First United Front between the two parties after he saw the support given by the Kuomintang in the Hong Kong seamen's strike.

=== 1925–26 Guangzhou–Hong Kong strike ===
The Guangzhou–Hong Kong strike between 1925 and 1926 was another key historical event of the labour movement in Hong Kong. It was triggered by the killing of a worker named Gu Zhenghong, who was a Communist Party member in a Japanese-owned mill in February 1925. The Communists launched an anti-imperialist demonstration in the Shanghai International Settlement on 30 May 1925, which is now referred to as the May 30th Movement. A Sikh policeman under British command opened fire on a crowd of Chinese demonstrators, killing nine and injuring much of the crowd. The incident fuelled even more anti-British sentiment across China. The Kuomintang gave funds to the Communists, who then in turn organised the strike on 18 June, which began with the walkout of over 80 percent of the senior students from the Queen's College. Many seamen, tramway drivers, printers and students led the walkout and left for Guangzhou. On 23 June 1925, the British and French troops opened fire on the strikers, killing 52 people and injuring over 170 demonstrators in the foreign concession of Shamian Island, which provoked more workers in Hong Kong who were working for foreign corporations to join the strike.

Various unions representing Hong Kong and mainland workers convened a conference in Guangzhou and formed the Guangzhou–Hong Kong Strike Committee chaired by Su Zhaozheng, under the direction of the CCP. The Strike Committee called for a boycott of all British goods and a ban on foreign ships utilising Hong Kong's ports. The strike paralysed the Hong Kong economy, as food prices began to soar, tax revenue began to drop sharply and the banking system started collapsing.

The strike began to fall apart after Sun Yat-sen died in March 1925 and Liao Zhongkai, a left-wing leader within the Kuomintang, was assassinated in August. After commander-in-chief of the National Revolutionary Army Chiang Kai-shek seized power, he confiscated the arms of the Strike Committee. The strike received less support as Chiang began his Northern Expedition in the middle of 1926. On 10 October 1926, the boycott was formally lifted after a compromise settlement was reached with the British, which signified the end of the 16-month strike. Several leftist labour unions including the Chinese Seamen's Union were prosecuted and their leaders arrested. New legislation to ban unions from being affiliated with organisations outside the colony and to outlaw strikes with political causes were also enacted.

== 1930s to 40s: From the anti-communist purge to the anti-Japanese resistance ==
=== Colonial suppression ===
The Shanghai massacre of April 1927 which was caused by Chiang Kai-shek's Kuomintang government led to the escape and relocation of the CCP's Guangzhou branch into Hong Kong until the Second United Front between the Kuomintang and the Chinese Communist Party was formed in 1936. The Communists in Hong Kong at that time were actively involved in military actions to overthrow the Kuomintang government in Guangdong.

The Communists experienced a period of White Terror during the late 1920s to 1930s in Hong Kong as Hong Kong Governor Cecil Clementi developed a close relationship with Kuomintang with the intention of suppressing suspected Communist and socialist activities. Despite facing pressure from the colonial government, Ho Chi Minh managed to found the Indochinese Communist Party in Hong Kong in February 1930 before he was arrested by the British authorities in June.

=== Anti-Japanese guerilla warfare ===
During the Second Sino-Japanese War, the Communist Party set up the Office of the Eighth Route Army which engaged works for United front in Hong Kong and raising funds disguised as the Yue Hwa Company. The Chinese Seamen's Union also organised a resistance movement by recruiting volunteers to cross over to Guangdong and wage a guerrilla war behind Japanese lines led by Zeng Sheng. There were also the Huizhou-Bao'an People's Anti-Japanese Guerrilla Force and the Dongguan-Bao'an-Huizhou People's Anti-Japanese Guerrilla Force militias which were formed in 1938. Commanded by Cai Guoliang, the guerrillas began operations in 1941 before the Japanese invasion of Hong Kong. On 2 December 1943, the Central Committee of the Chinese Communist Party regrouped the five guerrilla fighting units within the Pearl River Delta into the East River Column directly under Communist command. By 1943, the East River guerrillas had the total strength of about 5,000 full-time soldiers, who were divided into six detachments.

By the time of the Japanese surrender, the Communist Hong Kong-Kowloon Independence Brigade was the only military force left within the territory. The guerrillas took control of Tai Po and Yuen Long and all other market towns in the New Territories as well as outlying islands, until the British forces arrived on 30 August 1945 and accepted the formal surrender of the Japanese Empire. The agreement between the Hong Kong-Kowloon Independence Brigade and the British was reached, as the Communists would be allowed to set up a liaison office, and its members would be guaranteed freedom of travel and publication as long as they refrained from carrying out "unlawful" activities. The liaison office later became the New China News Agency, headed by Qiao Guanhua. The Hong Kong-Kowloon Independence Brigade fought with the Kuomintang as the Chinese Civil War resumed right after the end of the Sino-Japanese War.

=== Chinese Civil War ===
A Hong Kong Central Branch Bureau headed by Fang Fang was set up in June 1947 to spearhead propaganda campaigns against Chiang Kai-shek and his ally, the United States of America, as well as help facilitate guerrilla warfare in mainland China. A Hong Kong Works Committee was also set up to organise united front works programmes in education, publication, literature and art sectors, with the goal of bringing people to the side of the communist cause. Furthermore, the Kuomintang Revolutionary Committee, a party that broke away from Chiang Kai-shek, and the Chinese Democratic League, a small party consisting of intellectuals, were brought to the side of the Communists.

== Communism in Hong Kong after 1949 ==
In 1950, the United Kingdom became the first western nation to officially recognise the communist government of the People's Republic of China. As the Cold War approached and the outbreak of the Korean War started in 1950, the British colonial government tightened their control over local Communist activities, while communist parties remained mostly underground.

=== 1 March Incident of 1952 ===
The 1 March Incident of 1952 was the first major clash between the colonial authorities and the local communists. A huge crowd organised by the local communist party gathered around Jordan Road in Tsim Sha Tsui, with the goal of meeting with a delegation from Guangzhou to talk with the victims of the fire disaster at the Shek Kip Mei squatter area. The crowd confronted the police after news emerged of delegates being stopped at Fanling and then being sent back to China. More than a hundred people were arrested, while a textile worker was shot to death. The pro-Communist Ta Kung Pao was banned from publication for six months after it picked up the story and reprinted an editorial from the People's Daily, which denounced the colonial government and its repressive actions.

Mok Ying-kwai, the leader of the sympathetic delegate, was deported to the mainland and left the Hong Kong Chinese Reform Association (HKCRA), a leaderless organisation first set up in 1949 to demand constitutional reform. Percy Chen, the son of Eugene Chen and another leader of the delegation would later take charge of the association. The association became one of the three pillars of the pro-Communist faction, next to the Hong Kong Federation of Trade Unions (HKFTU) and the Chinese General Chamber of Commerce (CGCC).

=== 1967 Leftist riots in Hong Kong ===
The Hong Kong Federation of Trade Unions (HKFTU), which was established in 1948, has functioned as "friendly societies" based in industry and craft-based fraternities, and provided benefits and other supplementary aids to the veteran members who was under threat of unemployment and low wages during the 1950s and 1960s. It had a fierce contest with the pro-Kuomintang Hong Kong and Kowloon Trades Union Council (TUC) in industries, trades, and workplaces as part of the "left-right" ideological divide in that period.

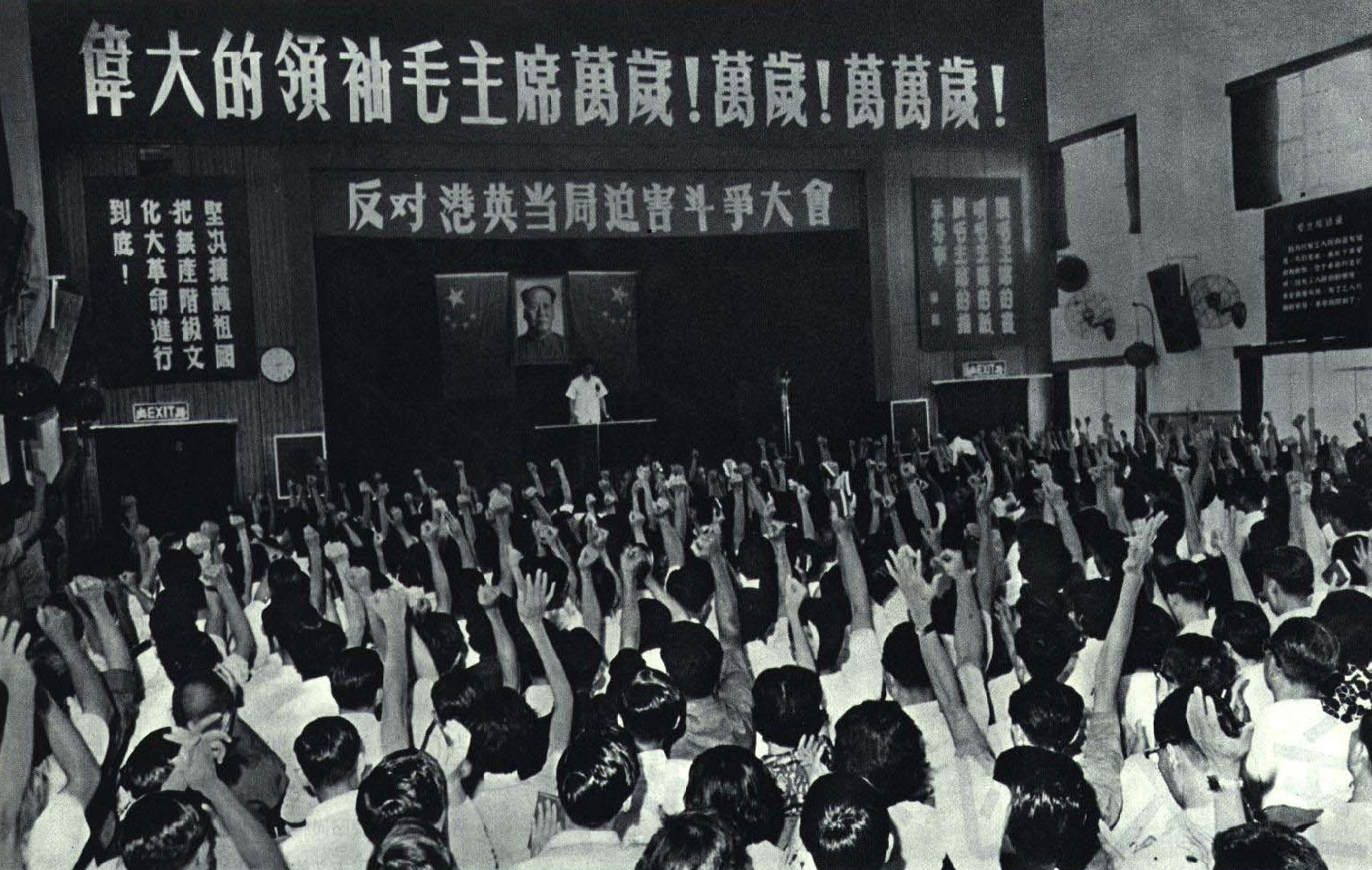
The 1967 Hong Kong Leftist riots, which were launched by Maoists, were one of the largest riots in Hong Kong's history.

The Cultural Revolution launched by Mao Zedong in mainland China inspired a tendency of radicalism within Maoist organisations in 1966. In December 1966, a leftist-led 12-3 incident in Macao successfully made the Portuguese Governor of Macao sign an apology for anti-worker measures that was covertly demanded by Beijing. Inspired by the protests in Macao, in May 1967, the Hong Kong communists escalated labour disputes in an artificial flower factory into an anti-government demonstration after many workers and labour representatives were arrested in the aftermath of violent clashes between workers and riot police on 6 May. On 16 May, the leftists formed the Committee of Hong Kong and Kowloon Compatriots from All Circles for Struggle Against British Persecution in Hong Kong and appointed Yeung Kwong of the Hong Kong Federation of Trade Unions as the Chairman of the committee.

The committee organised and coordinated a series of large-scale demonstrations. Hundreds of supporters from various leftist organisations demonstrated outside the Government House, chanting communist and socialist slogans and wielding placards with quotes from the Quotations From Chairman Mao Zedong in their left hands. At the same time, many workers started general strikes, with Hong Kong's transport services in particular being badly disrupted. Further violence erupted on 22 May, with another 167 people being arrested. The rioters began to adopt more sophisticated tactics, such as throwing stones at police or vehicles passing by, before retreating into leftist "strongholds" such as newspaper offices, banks or department stores once the police arrived.

Five policemen were killed when pro-Chinese militias exchanged fire with the Hong Kong Police at the Hong Kong border with mainland China in Sha Tau Kok on 8 July, which fueled speculation that the Communist government's takeover of Hong Kong was imminent. The committee's call for a general strike was unsuccessful, and the colonial government declared a state of emergency. Leftist newspapers were banned from publishing, schools populated by leftists were shut down, and many leftist leaders were arrested and detained, and some of them were later deported to mainland China. The leftists retaliated by planting bombs throughout the city which began to randomly detonate and seriously disrupted the daily life of ordinary people, erroneously killing several pedestrians, which sharply turned public opinion against the rioters. The riots did not end until October 1967. Many labour activists and HKFTU cadres were imprisoned and deported to China, and due to its violent campaign of terrorism and bomb attacks, the HKFTU suffered serious setbacks in both public esteem and official tolerance by the Hong Kong government.

== 1960s movement for autonomy and sovereignty ==
Asides from the left-right polarisation between the Kuomintang and the Communists, there were also calls for liberalisation and self-government during the 1950s and 1960s. The self-proclaimed anti-communist and anti-colonial Democratic Self-Government Party of Hong Kong was founded in 1963, which called for a fully autonomous and sovereign government, in which the Chief Minister would be elected by all Hong Kong residents through universal suffrage, while the British government would only preserve its authority over Hong Kong's diplomacy and military.

In addition, the Hong Kong Socialist Democratic Party was founded by Sun Pao-kang, who was a member of the Chinese Democratic Socialist Party, along with the Labour Party of Hong Kong, which was founded by Tang Hon-tsai and K. Hopkin-Jenkins, who directly professed socialist ideology by promoting a welfare state and common ownership of the means of production, distribution, and exchange. However, after failing to obtain any meaningful concessions from the colonial government of Hong Kong, all of the parties advocating sovereignty and autonomy ceased to exist by the mid-1970s.

== 1970s youth movements ==
The 1970s saw a wave of youth movements, which emerged from events like the Baodiao movement when the question of the sovereignty of the Diaoyu Islands appeared in the early 1970s. Led by mostly the young generation of the baby boomers, about 30 demonstrations were organised between February 1971 and May 1972. A violent clash broke out on 7 July 1971, in a demonstration launched by the Hong Kong Federation of Students (HKFS) at Victoria Park in which police commissioner Henry N. Whitlely violently assaulted protesters with his baton. 21 protesters were arrested and dozens more were injured. The event became one of the catalysts of the 1970s youth movements in Hong Kong.

== 1980s to 90s: The sweep of neoliberalism ==
After Deng Xiaoping came to power in 1978, China underwent a period of radical economic liberalisation, which the Communist Party later labelled as "socialism with Chinese characteristics". At the same time, Beijing also signed the Sino-British Joint Declaration with the British government, which determined that Hong Kong shall be transferred to mainland China in 1997. The trend of neoliberalism also dominated in Hong Kong, as the city was undergoing a transformation from an industrial-based economy to one based on finance and real estate.

=== Pro-Beijing ===
To counter the growing influence of liberalism, the Hong Kong Federation of Trade Unions (HKFTU), which was the largest grassroots organisation in the traditional pro-Communist bloc, assumed a vanguard role to resist the pre-1997 democratisation. It joined hands with the conservative pro-business elites to oppose the direct Legislative Council election of 1988, using the slogan: "Hong Kong workers want meal tickets, not electoral ballots." However, during the Hong Kong Basic Law drafting process from 1985 to 1990, the HKFTU had to repudiate its demands on the rights and recognition of trade unions and collective bargaining in the Consultative and Drafting Committees, which were dominated by business tycoons. The HKFTU's devotion to Beijing and its collaboration with the conservative business interests of Hong Kong was criticised and challenged by several leftist union members.

In 1992, a pro-Beijing party named the Democratic Alliance for the Betterment of Hong Kong (DAB) was co-founded by HKFTU members. The HKFTU also began to mobilise supporters to vote for the DAB candidates in the subsequent Legislative Council elections. In 1997, the HKFTU representatives joined the Beijing-controlled Provisional Legislative Council, and rolled back several pre-handover legislation supporting labour rights passed in the spring of 1997 by the colonial legislature controlled by the pro-democracy camp, which included the right to collective bargaining under the Employee's Rights to Representation, Consultation and Collective Bargaining Ordinance, introduced by the HKCTU's Lee Cheuk-yan. The Provisional Legislative Council also enacted new electoral rules to disenfranchise 800,000 blue-collar, grey-collar, and white-collar workers in the nine functional constituencies created from Chris Patten's electoral reforms. The number of eligible voters in the Labour functional constituency was reduced from 2,001 qualified union officials in 1995 to only 361 unionists on a one-vote-per-union basis for the first post-handover elections in 1998.

=== Pro-democrats ===
Some leftists, such as Tsang Shu-ki, saw a chance for Hong Kong to transform into a reformed capitalist mixed economy, a welfare state, and a democratic society, which would integrate into a democratic socialist China. In 1983, Tsang co-founded the Meeting Point, which became one of the first groups to welcome the transfer of Hong Kong to mainland China. However, Trotskyists such as Leung Kwok-hung harshly criticised Tsang's reformist ideas, instead calling for an uprising against the capitalist-colonial regime in Hong Kong and the bureaucratic regime in mainland China under the banner of social democracy.

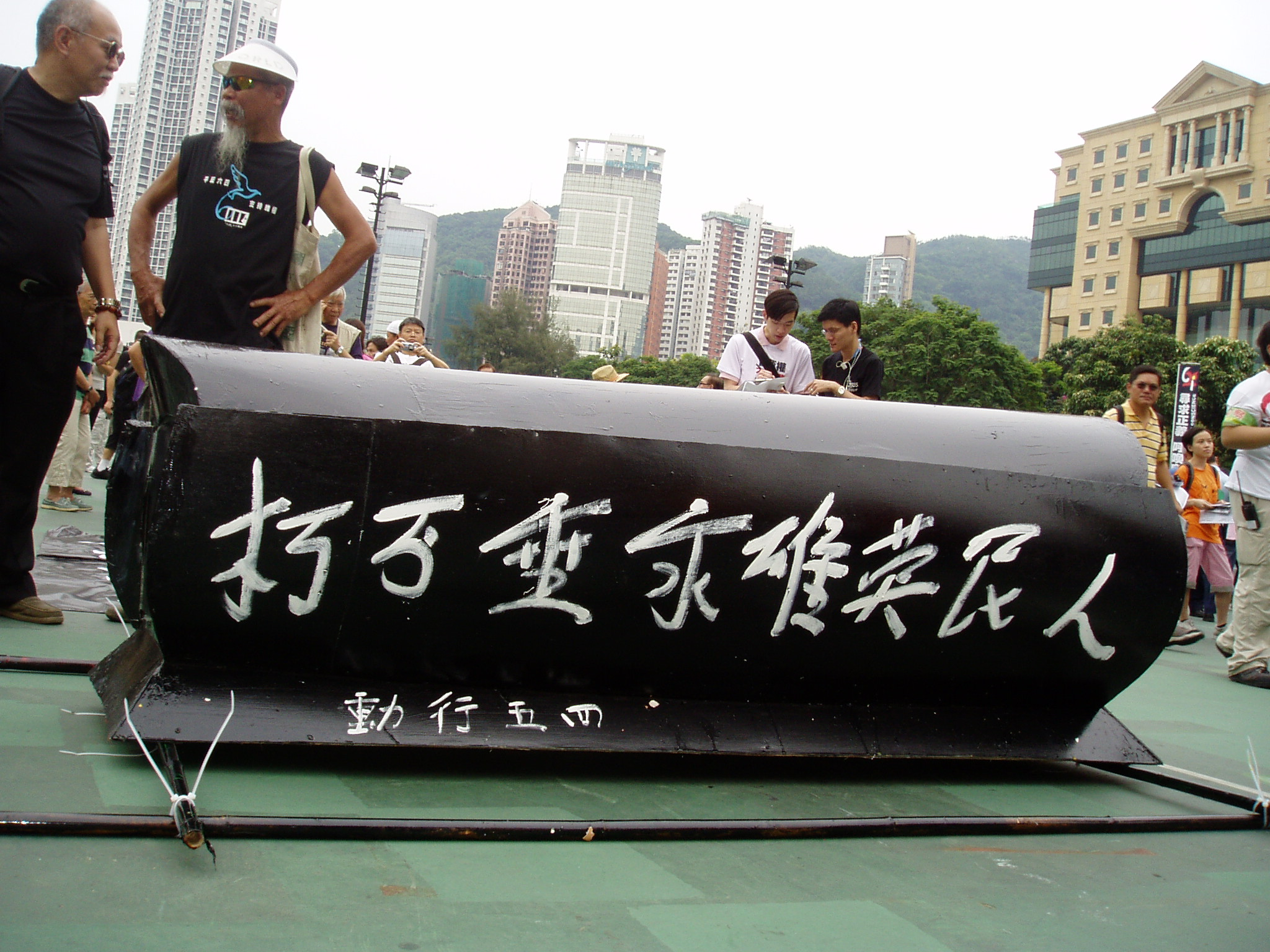
Members of the April Fifth Action in Victoria Park in 2009, who came to commemorate the victims of the 1989 Tiananmen square massacre.

The Meeting Point and the grassroots Hong Kong Association for Democracy and People's Livelihood (HKADPL) began to participate in the local elections with the Hong Kong Affairs Society (HKAS), and soon the three groups became the major forces of the pro-democratic camp in the late 1980s. The pro-democrats formed the Hong Kong Alliance in Support of Patriotic Democratic Movements in China (HKASPDMC), led by president of the Hong Kong Professional Teachers' Union (HKPTU) and former Communist Szeto Wah, who were in support of the student and labour movement in May 1989. They harshly condemned the bloody crackdown by the CCP regime on the morning of 4 June, which led to a longterm rupture of relations between Beijing and the majority of the pro-democratic camp.

The Hong Kong Confederation of Trade Unions (HKCTU), which emerged from the Hong Kong Christian Industrial Committee (HKCIC), became the major pro-democratic labour union in 1990. At the same year, the United Democrats of Hong Kong (UDHK), which was later transformed into the Democratic Party, was established as a grand alliance of pro-democratic politicians, professionals, activists and trade unionists. The pro-democratic camp won a landslide victory in the 1991 Hong Kong legislative election, and received an even larger majority in the 1995 Legislative Council election in the aftermath of the liberal 1994 Hong Kong electoral reform.

== Since 1997 ==
=== The Young Turks ===
In the first years of the post-handover period, the Democratic Party, which was the largest pro-democratic party, suffered severe intra-party struggles, as the left-wing Young Turks faction led by Andrew To challenged the conservative centrist leadership. During the Democratic Party's leadership election, the Young Turks nominated Lau Chin-shek, the General Secretary of the Hong Kong Confederation of Trade Unions (HKCTU), to run for the position of Vice-Chairman against Anthony Cheung. In a general meeting held in September 1999, the Young Turks also proposed to put minimum wage legislation on the 2000 LegCo election platform of the party, which led to the backlash from the party's leadership. After failing to exert sufficient influence upon the party, the Young Turks formed another political group called the Social Democratic Forum, and later defected to the more radical Frontier.

=== League of Social Democrats ===
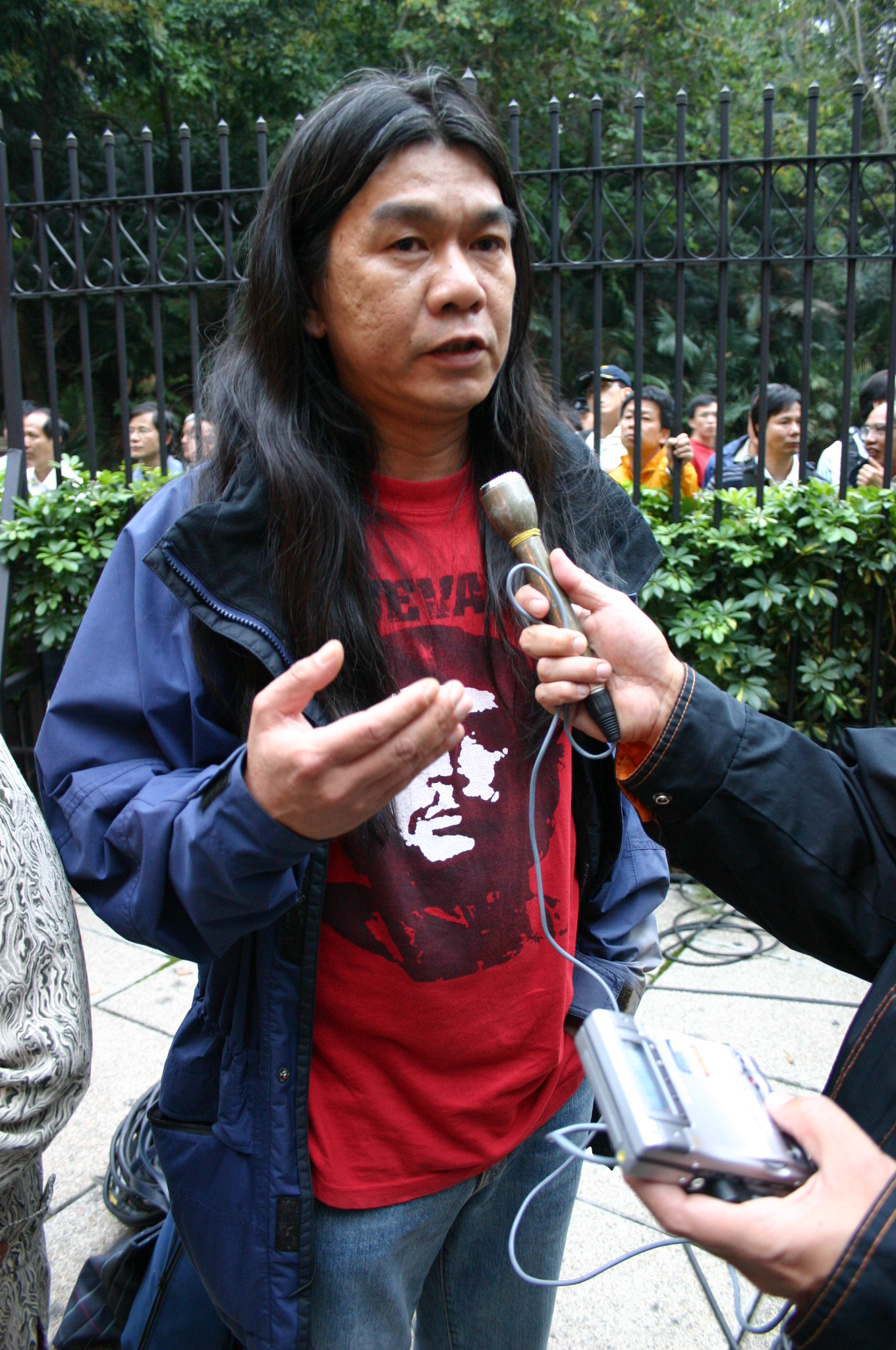
Leung Kwok-hung (1956–), arguably one of the most famous socialists in contemporary Hong Kong politics.

In October 2006, Andrew To, legislator Leung Kwok-hung of the April Fifth Action, legislator and former Democratic Party member Albert Chan and the radical radio host named Wong Yuk-man founded the League of Social Democrats (LSD), the first self-proclaimed leftist and social democratic party in Hong Kong. The League managed to win three seats in the 2008 Legislative Council election, receiving 10 percent of the popular vote.

In 2010, the League launched the "Five Constituencies Referendum" movement, triggering a territory-wide by-election by having five legislators resign from the Legislative Council in each constituency in order to pressure the government to implement universal suffrage. The purpose of the by-election as a referendum expectedly was heavily criticised by Beijing and Hong Kong's pro-Beijing camp as unconstitutional. The Democratic Party refused to join the movement and sought for a less confrontational way to negotiate with Beijing. The movement was considered as a failure, with only 17.7 percent of the registered voters casting their votes even though all three League legislators have successfully returned to the LegCo.

In 2011, the party was heavily devastated from intra-party struggles as former chairman Wong Yuk-man disagreed with the policies of the incumbent chairman Andrew To, including his diplomacy with the Democratic Party, which reached an agreement with the Chinese Communist authorities over the electoral reform proposals. On 24 January 2011, two of the three legislators of the party, Wong Yuk-man and Albert Chan, quit the LSD along with many of the League's leading figures, citing disagreement with leader Andrew To and his faction as their reasons for their departure. About 200 of their supporters joined them, leaving the LSD in complete disarray. Wong and Chan formed the People Power with other defected members and radical groups which left the League only one seat in the legislature, occupied by Leung Kwok-hung.

In the 2011 District Council election, the party lost all its seats in the District Councils to pro-Beijing candidates. During the following elections in 2015, the party along with a small Trotskyist group Socialist Action failed to win any seat.

In the 2016 Legislative Council election the League formed an electoral alliance with the People Power movement to boost the chance of their candidates, after witnessing the rise of localism in Hong Kong. The alliance won two seats in the New Territories East constituency, which was taken by two incumbents, Leung Kwok-hung and Chan Chi-chuen. Leung was later unseated in 2017 by the courts in a wave of disqualifications of the legislators over their oath-taking manners, which saw the League being ousted from all elected offices.

=== Left 21 ===
A small socialist group by the name of Left 21 emerged after the failure of the massive anti-Guangzhou–Shenzhen–Hong Kong Express Rail Link (XRL) protest movement, as the leftist faction criticised the lack of class discourse in the movement's leadership. It started a year-long Occupy Central protest as part of the international Occupy movement, commencing the protest at a plaza beneath the HSBC headquarters from 2011 to 2012. It also joined the 40-day 2013 Hong Kong dock strike at the Kwai Tsing Container Terminal called by the Union of Hong Kong Dockers (UHKD), an affiliate of the Hong Kong Confederation of Trade Unions (HKCTU). It became the longest running industrial strike in Hong Kong in years.

=== Labour Party ===
In 2011, four incumbent legislators, Lee Cheuk-yan of the Hong Kong Confederation of Trade Unions (HKCTU), Cyd Ho of the Civic Act-up and Cheung Kwok-che of the Hong Kong Social Workers General Union (HKSWGU), co-founded the Labour Party, whose core issues were labour rights, new immigrants, ethnic minorities and environmentalism, and the party has run in the 2012 Legislative Council election. The Labour won four seats in the election, receiving four percent of the popular vote, becoming the third largest pro-democratic party after the liberal Democratic Party and Civic Party. Facing the left-leaning localists that emerged from the Umbrella Revolution, whose names were Nathan Law, Lau Siu-lai and Eddie Chu, the veteran Labour legislators Lee Cheuk-yan and Cyd Ho were surprisingly unseated, which caused the Labour Party's seats to drop from four to one.

== See also ==
- Democratic development in Hong Kong
- United front in Hong Kong

=== Other ideologies in Hong Kong ===
- Anarchism in Hong Kong
- Centrism in Hong Kong
- Conservatism in Hong Kong
- Liberalism in Hong Kong
- Localism in Hong Kong
