= UHKD =

UHKD may refer to:

- UHKD, the ICAO code for Dzyomgi Airport, Khabarovsk Krai, Russia
- Union of Hong Kong Dockers, the affiliate of the Hong Kong Confederation of Trade Unions
