= 2013 Hong Kong dock strike =

Labour dispute in Hong Kong

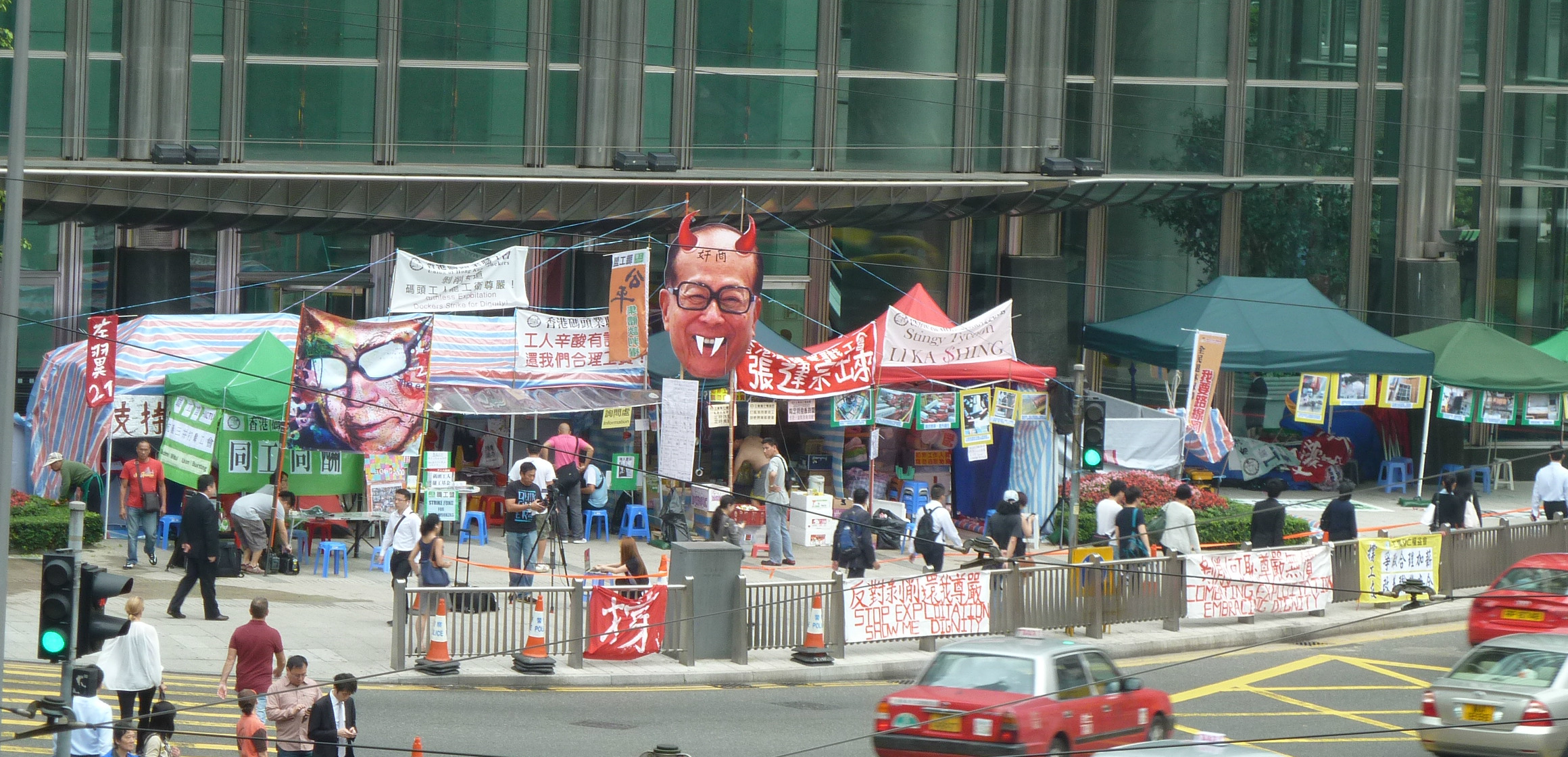
- Dock protesters camped outside Cheung Kong Centre (headquarters of Hutchison Whampoa)
- Location: Hong Kong
- Methods: Strikes and protests

Parties
Union of Hong Kong Dockers; Hong Kong Confederation of Trade Unions; Supported by: Labour Party (Hong Kong); Hong Kong Federation of Trade Unions; Federation of Hong Kong and Kowloon Labour Unions; Hong Kong Federation of Students; International Trade Union Confederation	Hongkong International Terminals Ltd. (HIT); Hutchison Port Holdings Trust (HPHT); Hutchison Whampoa Ltd (HWL); Supported by: Liberal Party (Hong Kong)

Lead figures
Lee Cheuk-yan; Chan Chiu-wai	Li Ka-shing; Canning Fok; John Meredith; Gerry Yim Lui-fai

The 2013 Hong Kong dock strike was a 40-day labour strike at the Kwai Tsing Container Terminal. It was called by the Union of Hong Kong Dockers (UHKD), an affiliate of the Hong Kong Confederation of Trade Unions (HKCTU) on 28 March 2013, against contracting companies to whom workforce management had been out-sourced by the Hongkong International Terminals Ltd. (HIT), subsidiary of Hutchison Port Holdings Trust (HPHT), which is in turn owned by Hutchison Whampoa Ltd (HWL), flagship company of Li Ka-shing, Hong Kong's richest man. The strike workers demanded better pay and working conditions. The strike ended on 6 May 2013 when the strikers accepted the offer of 9.8% pay rise. It was the longest running industrial action in Hong Kong in years. Public support and media attention on the strike were unprecedented in the city's history. Some observers marked this as the rejuvenation of political engagement.

== Demands ==
Earlier before the strike, the dockers demanded a 12 per cent pay hike, plus overtime pay at 1.5 times the basic wage in January 2013. The demand was not fulfilled.

On 28 March, some 450 crane operators and stevedores went on strike inside the Kwai Tsing Container Terminal, for better pay and conditions. They demanded a $1.60 per hour raise. More workers joined the action, but they were forced outside the port after the local court granted HIT a temporary injunction on 1 April banning unionists and their supporters from entering any of the four Kwai Tsing container terminals.

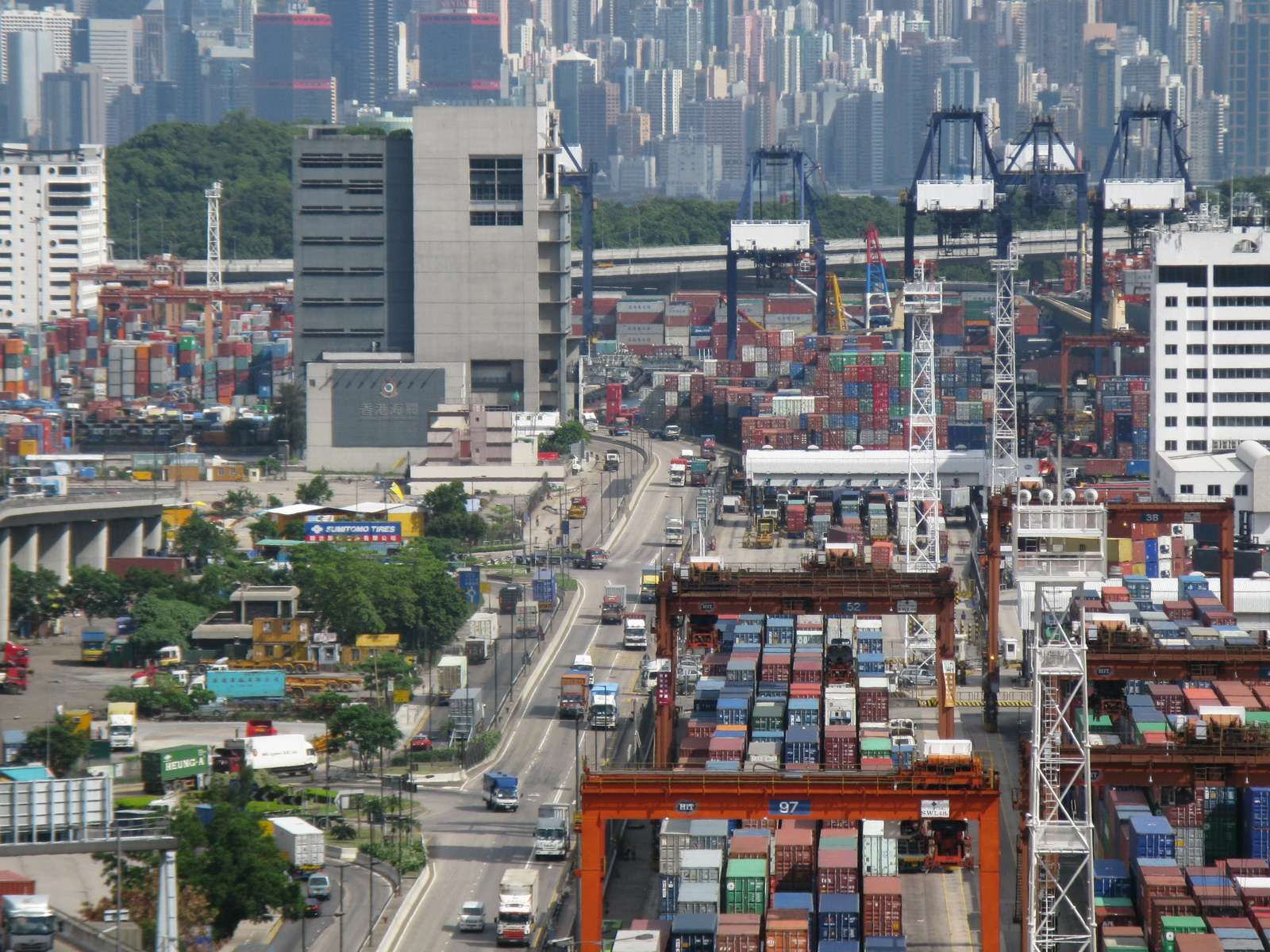
Kwai Tsing Container Terminal in 2008.

Dockers complained that they have had a minimal rise in income in the last 10 years. Mr Lee, a dock worker for more than 20 years, said there had been two very low adjustments. "Basically, there's no fringe benefits, we only had paid leave in recent years. My monthly income isn't steady. I earn HK$15,000–$16,000 (US$2,000) during the high season, and less than HK$10,000 (US$1,300) for the low season." The workers demanded a 20% pay rise to a daily wage of HK$1,600, equivalent to a monthly salary of HK$24,000 based on 15 working days. Chan Chiu-wai, an organiser of the Confederation of Trade Unions, said that dock workers earned $167 a day for 24 consecutive hours' work, less than they received in 1997. Chan said staff often work shifts of up to 72 consecutive hours during high-season. "For this work, the salary is very low, the working conditions are very poor and the hours are very long, so we are often in the position of being understaffed and the workers have to work many hours overtime," Chan added.

According to the strike leader, Lee Cheuk-yan general secretary of the Hong Kong Confederation of Trade Unions and also the Labour Party legislator and said the checker and lashing man was receiving only HK$1,310 per 24 hours. They had to station in the terminal for 24 hours and work; crane operators would often continuously work 12 hours in the crane; they would eat and answer calls of nature inside the booth. Workers said whilst HIT had granted increases to the contractors over the years, the latter had not passed on increases to the workers. "We are overworked, not given enough rest time, and we don't have proper toilet breaks. We have to shit in newspapers in our cranes."

HIT dismissed claims that workers were being paid less now than they were in 1997. "It's also wrong that their pay is now lower than in 1997 or during SARS," HIT general manager Gerry Yim Lui-fai told the South China Morning Post. Several long-serving stevedores working for Lem Wing Transportation and Everbest dismissed the strikers' claims as exaggeration. A 7-year veteran crane driver said "It's not that we can't go to the toilet or don't have time for a meal... In fact, we have short breaks of two to three minutes between vessels berthing at the terminals. Very rarely can I get 15 to 30 minutes. We also take turns to have meals so that we have around 15 to 20 minutes for mealtimes." He said that he enjoyed a pay increase in 2011. Two Everbest employees said that, by working as a pair and managing their time during a 24-hour shift, they can alternate and work six or twelve hours. They said they took home HK$1,315 and HK$1,441, (between US$170 and $185) per shift, averaging HK$20,000 ($2,560) per month. They also said that some of their colleagues wanted to return to work, but were worried they would be chastised as spineless.

== Negotiations and strike actions ==
Hong Kong International Terminals, subsidiary of Hutchison International, operates the port with a number of directly employed staff supplemented by employees hired via four subcontractors. Subcontractors – who are not genuinely independent companies – are intermediaries used to put distance between HIT and workforce, to hold down wages and provide operational flexibility. HIT refused to negotiate with the workers, saying that such matters were subcontractors' responsibility.

The CTU insisted that it would refuse to talk with individual contractors, and would talk only if all the contractors were present. The first meeting between the Union of Hong Kong Dockers and contractors were held under the mediation of the Labour Department on 10 April but broke off without any immediate progress. The representative of the Beijing-loyalist Hong Kong Federation of Trade Unions (FTU) which did not join the strike and the rival union of the pro-democratic Confederation of Trade Unions said they would only look for a 12-percent rise, compared to the 23 per cent increase demanded by the Confederation of Trade Unions as they claimed.

A second round of talks between striking dock workers and the contractors, mediated by the Labour Department, ended without agreement on 11 April, but both sides said they would consider each other's proposals. Another negotiation failed to reach agreement on 12 April. The two unions present at the meeting were the Federation of Trade Unions, whose members are not on strike, and the Federation of Hong Kong and Kowloon Labour Unions, representing the Hong Kong Docks and Ports Industry Unions whose 300 workers are employed directly by the port operator, HIT, and who were staging a work-to-rule. The FTU says it will not accept a five per cent pay-rise and a two per cent increase in welfare benefits. The two unions insisted on 12 per cent.

On day 18 of the strike, Hongkong International Terminals issued a statement declaring optimism that operations were returning to normal, with "more workers returning to their posts". HIT said that the terminal was running at 86 to 90 per cent handling capacity over the previous weekend. The union rejected the claim that some strikers had returned to work, saying their 450 striking colleagues had reduced terminal handling capacity to 15 containers each hour instead of 25 before the strike began. However, The Standard noted some signs of a drift back to work over the previous five days.

On 17 April, another round of talks between striking dock workers and the employers made little progress as the contractors rejected the 23-percent wage increase demanded by the CTU and stood firm of their seven-percent pay rise proposal. After the talks failed on 17 April, CTU members escalated their industrial action by setting up camp outside the Cheung Kong Center, where the Hutchison Whampoa Group is headquartered.

Global Stevedores, a contractor who employs fewer than 200 dock workers, announced on 19 April that it would be winding up in June at the expiry of its contract with HIT due to "an inability ... to continue its operations" – three-quarters of the company's workers had gone on strike and the union's 20-percent pay rise demand could not be met. However, the workers regard this closure as a move calculated to put pressure on them.

During the third week of the dispute, the union and HIT both engaged in war of words in the press. HIT took out full-page advertisements in almost all local newspapers on 20 April, except the anti-government Apple Daily, not merely defending itself but making personal attacks on Lee Cheuk-yan claiming he is using the workers to further his own political ends. HIT's advertisement in the English-language press said union demands for a 20 per cent raise would "create an impact across other industries and cause irreparable damage to Hong Kong." Canning Fok, managing director of the Hutchsion Whampoa group, publicly alleged that Lee Cheuk-yan was not genuinely interested in helping the workers and harboured ulterior motives. He criticised Lee for "resort[ing] to every means ... hoping that as the strike drags on, he can negotiate with Mr Li so as to boost his own publicity." Fok likened the style of the dispute to the Cultural Revolution, "where people are vilified on banners and posters". The SCMP estimated the series of adverts would have cost around HK$1 million. Workers took out advertising space in Ming Pao Daily with a headline suggesting that Li Ka-shing did not really understand their situation.

On 1 May 2013, Hutchison Port Holdings group managing director John Meredith published an article in several Chinese-language newspapers said the strike was jeopardising Hong Kong's entrepot status. "The union and its leaders said they would protect the livelihood of workers, but it seems to me that they are more concerned about the political bargaining chip they have gained," he said. Meredith accused Lee Cheuk-yan for ignoring such facts, saying that Lee's "Cultural Revolution-style" banners targeted tycoon Li Ka-shing and even Hutchison businesses, stating making politicised and exaggerated gestures do not help. Lee slammed the company for resorting to delaying tactics and neglecting the problems of pay rises and working conditions.

After 40 days of strike action, the union called an end to the dispute, having secured promises of a pay deal of 9.8 per cent for all workers including non-strikers and improved working conditions.

== Strike consequences ==
The unions say the striking workers account for some 30%–40% of dock employees serving Hutchison's terminals in the city. HIT said the strike is costing it HK$5 million (US$644,000) in daily losses. According to the chairman of Hong Kong Association of Freight Forwarding and Logistics, vessels now need to queue up outside of Hong Kong port for two to four days before being able to berth; the wait was negligible just before the strike. The association estimated 120,000 twenty-foot equivalent units (TEUs) have accumulated since the strike action began two weeks earlier.

Although the docks are said to be operating at approximately 80 per cent capacity, an insider at one major Japanese shipping line said that the company's cargo traffic via Hong Kong has been delayed by more than three days due to the strikes, prompting the line to consider rescheduling some of their ships to first call at other cities. Several shipping lines, such as Evergreen Marine, Mitsui OSK Lines, are reported to have diverted vessels to other ports, or skipping Hong Kong altogether. The strike had accelerated the migration of ships to ports in Shenzhen and Shanghai as Hong Kong had been shipping mainly manufactured goods from China to overseas buyers. From a peak of 297 million tonnes in 2014 to 174 million tonnes in 2023 according to Port Cargo Statistics of HK.

An industry insider said that Hong Kong ports needed to stay competitive as it was already facing strong competition from other ports in the region such as Shenzhen; the trend, shifting from transshipping to directly importing through a mainland Chinese port, was not in Hong Kong's favour. Hongkong International said that instead of losing HK$5 million, the strike was costing it HK$2.4 million daily from 5 April because an "increasing number" of workers returned to work.

Shares in Hutchison Port Holdings Trust listed on the Singapore Exchange dropped to US$0.81 on 17 April, which is the lowest since the Kwai Tsing dock strike began after research showed that the strike could have cost the port operator HK$100 million in revenue.

== Public response ==
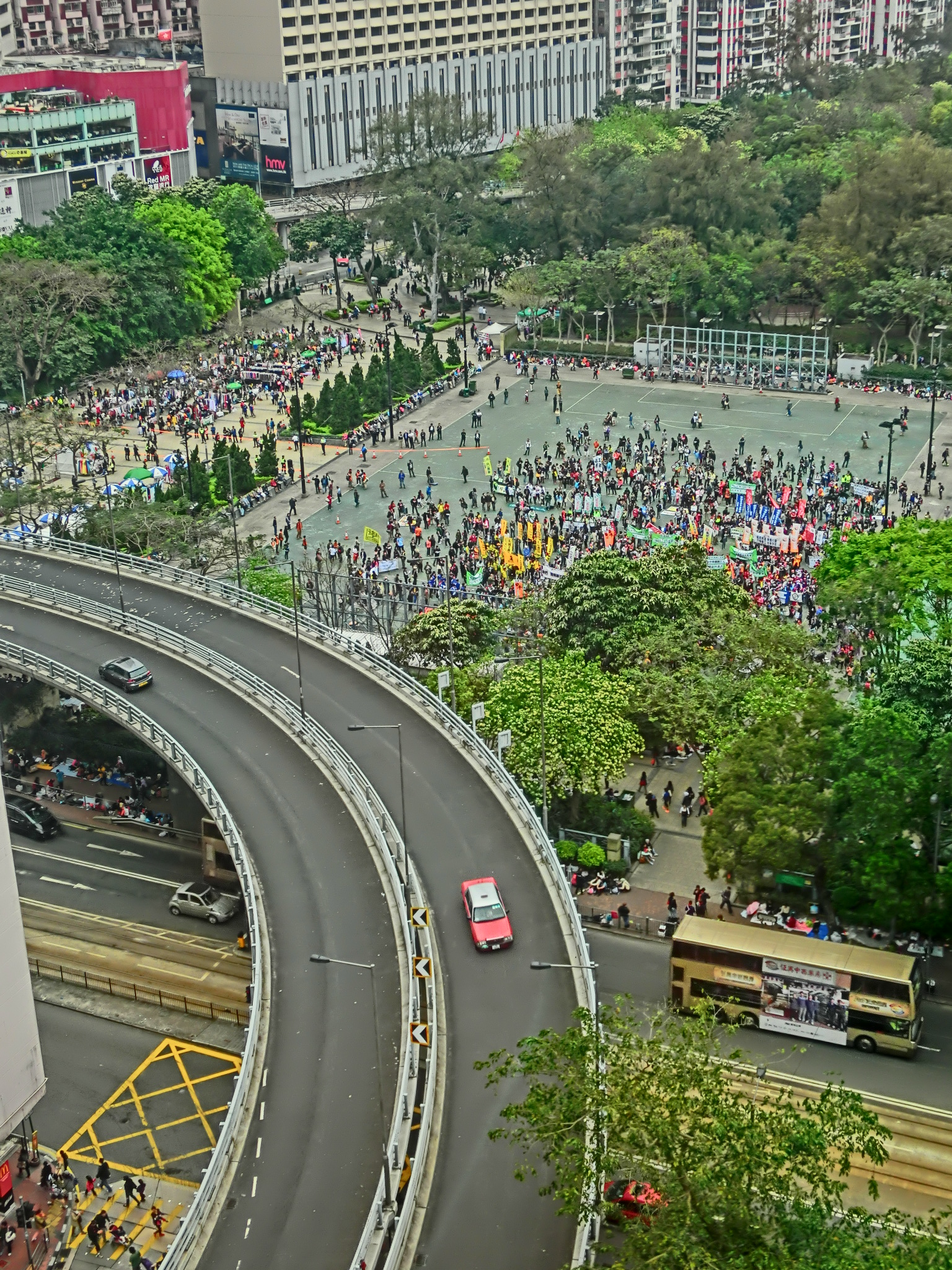
Protestors gathered at Victoria Park, Hong Kong on the afternoon of 7 April

The workers have attracted many supporters among student unions and pro-democracy parties in Hong Kong. The Hong Kong Federation of Students have organised donation and supply collection points outside major train stations. Hong Kong's pro-democracy Labour Party is also supporting the strike, in which the party's chairman Lee Cheuk-yan is also the leader of the Confederation of Trade Unions and organiser of the strike.

The union was paying the striking workers (HK)$1,000 per day, and was encouraged to have gained the support of the International Trade Union Confederation. Lee Cheuk-yan expressed confidence that "the strike will not be easily displaced.". Sympathisers have been making donations to support the workers, and union's fund reached US$645,000 on 16 April 2013, sufficient for union members' lost wages only for about 10 days.

On 7 April, protesters marched from Victoria Park to Central carrying placards and modified images of Li Ka-shing's with devil's horns and the Chinese character for "monster" (妖) written across his forehead. Organisers said that 4,000 demonstrators joined the march; police estimated 2,800 at its peak. The Liberal Party's youth committee chairman criticised the CTU for politicising the dispute.

== Media coverage ==
Next Magazine published on 3 April reported that the managing director of the HIT Gerry Yim Lui-fai, who earlier said that the workers should negotiate with the contractors but not HIT refused to involve in the dispute, was a board member of one of the contractors involved in the pay dispute. HIT denied this; Yim reiterated that no members of top management of Hutchison Whampoa, Hutchison Port Holdings Trust or HIT are board members of any of the contractors. Yim said that the name of Sakoma – the HIT subsidiary that previously dealt with out-sourcing contracts – still appears on the entry passcards, and acknowledged it was a mistake for that name to be there. Yim said the Hutchison Logistics, replacing Sakoma, is now responsible for management of out-sourcing.

The programme Scoop on TVB, the dominant terrestrial television channel in Hong Kong, on 1 April drew criticism. The strikers objected to the programme, saying it was biased, misleading and did not give enough airtime to the strikers. The Communications Authority had received 1,800 complaints within four days and TVB said it had received 47 complaints from the audience, and the broadcaster had no particular stance.
