= Ng Chau-pei =

President of the Hong Kong Federation of Trade Unions

The Honourable Stanley Ng
- 吳秋北
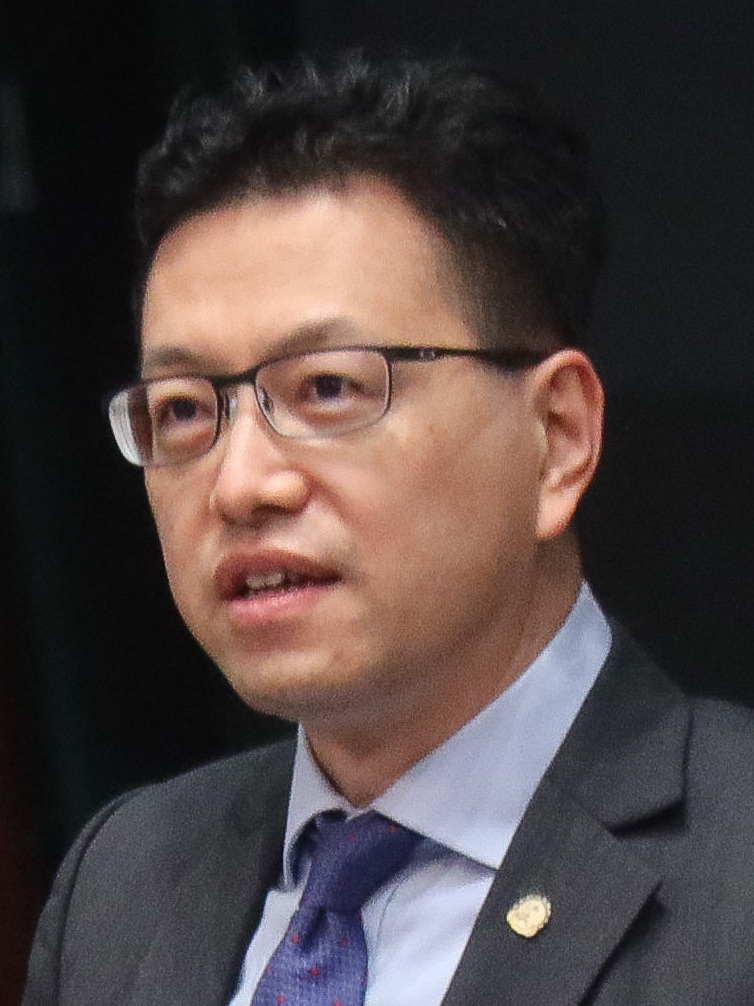
- Ng in 2023

President of the Hong Kong Federation of Trade Unions
- Incumbent
- Assumed office 16 April 2018
- Preceded by: Lam Shuk-yee

Member of the Legislative Council
- Incumbent
- Assumed office 1 January 2022
- Preceded by: New constituency
- Constituency: Hong Kong Island East

Chairman of the Hong Kong Federation of Trade Unions
- In office 20 April 2009 – 16 April 2018
- Preceded by: Wong Kwok-kin
- Succeeded by: Wong Kwok

Personal details
- Born: February 1970 (age 56) Jinjiang, Fujian, China
- Party: Hong Kong Federation of Trade Unions
- Education: Chinese Academy of Social Sciences
- Occupation: Trade unionist

Stanley Ng Chau-pei
- Traditional Chinese: 吳秋北
- Simplified Chinese: 吴秋北
Transcriptions
Standard Mandarin
- Hanyu Pinyin: Wú Qiūběi
Yue: Cantonese
- Jyutping: ng4 cau1 bak1

Stanley Ng Chau-pei (born February 1970) is a Hong Kong pro-Beijing politician and labour unionist and the incumbent president and former chairman of the Hong Kong Federation of Trade Unions (HKFTU), the largest trade union in Hong Kong, and also a Hong Kong deputy to the National People's Congress. He is also a member of the Legislative Council, representing the Hong Kong Island East constituency.

== Biography ==
He was born in February 1970 of Fujianese origin. He is educated at the Chinese Academy of Social Sciences. He is a member of the Hong Kong Clerical and Professional Employees General Union and its president. Through the General Union he has become the core member of the Hong Kong Federation of Trade Unions (FTU) after he joined in 1997 and became the chairman of the HKFTU. He is also a Hong Kong deputy to the National People's Congress and member of the Standing Committee of the Xiamen Chinese People's Political Consultative Conference.

In the 2006 Hong Kong Election Committee Subsector elections, he was elected through the Labour Subsector as the member of the HKFTU. The 800-member election committee was responsible for the 2007 Hong Kong Chief Executive election in which Beijing's favourite Donald Tsang won against Alan Leong from the pan-democracy camp.

He was appointed by the Hong Kong government to many public positions such as the Employee's Compensation Insurances Levies Management Board from 2013, the Labour Advisory Board from 2011, the Mandatory Provident Fund Schemes Appeal Board from 2012 to 2014, the Standard Working Hours Committee since 2013. He had also been a part-time member of the government's Central Policy Unit.

Ng was also one of initiators of the Alliance for Peace and Democracy, a counter political alliance orchestrated by Beijing against the Occupy Central with Love and Peace launched by the pan-democrats to pressure Beijing to implement genuine democracy. He organised the anti-"Occupy" rally on 17 August 2014.

In April 2018, he succeeded Lam Shuk-yee to be the president of the FTU with Vice President Wong Kwok replacing him as the chairman.

Ng criticised the decision of Court of Final Appeal in September 2018 to free the group of 13 activists, who had each received jail sentences of up to 13 months from a lower court for unlawful assembly outside the Legislative Council Complex on 13 June 2014. "How could this be an act of loving and protecting young people? [The judges] are killing them!" Ng said as he accused the judges "sinners of society". Ng's remarks drew criticism from the pro-democrats, as well as Chief Executive Carrie Lam which said his comments were "unacceptable".

During the 2019–20 Hong Kong protests, Ng slammed Li Ka Shing with coarse Cantonese slang, depicted Li as "cockroach" king in a post on social media. "Cockroach" is frequently being used by the police in Hong Kong as a slur for protestors.

In March 2021, Apple Daily reported that Ng had criticized RTHK, stating that it was skewed and unprofessional.

In February 2022, after the Witman Hung birthday party controversy, Ng defended Hung and said that "His awareness about the epidemic situation was not strong enough, but he has faced public criticisms over it, and I do not see why he should step down from the NPC".

In August 2023, after the High Court ruled that the Department of Justice could not ban the song Glory to Hong Kong, Ng said "The court's ruling has failed to fully consider the facts and legal points provided by the DoJ."

In December 2025, he was re-elected as Legislative Councilor through Hong Kong Island East Constituency with 39,707 votes.

In June 2026, Ng claimed that arrests resulting from the 2024 Hong Kong trade office spy case were "complete political manipulation and judicial fabrication" by the UK government.

== See also ==
- Radical pro-Beijing camp

Political offices
Preceded by Wong Kwok-kin	Chairman of the Hong Kong Federation of Trade Unions; 2009–2018	Succeeded by Wong Kwok
Preceded by Lam Shuk-yee	President of the Hong Kong Federation of Trade Unions; 2018–present	Incumbent
Preceded by Wong Kwok-kin	Non-official Member of Executive Council; 2022–present	Incumbent
Legislative Council of Hong Kong
New constituency	Member of Legislative Council; Representative for Hong Kong Island East; 2022–present	Incumbent
