= G. S. Kennedy-Skipton =

Irish-Hong Konger politician

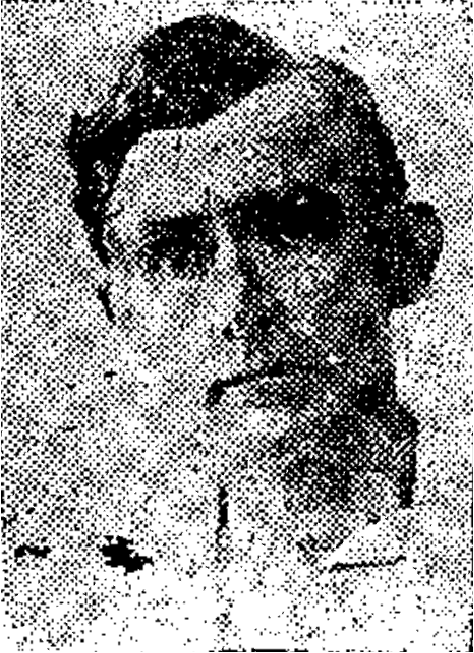
G. S. Kennedy-Skipton ca. 1952

George Stacey Kennedy-Skipton (31 August 1898 – 1982) was an Irish Hong Kong politician, senior civil servant and teacher. He was accused of collaborating with the Japanese during the Japanese occupation of Hong Kong. After the war, he ran for the Urban Council twice in 1952 and 1967 and was the secretary of the Labour Party of Hong Kong, a socialist self-government party.

== Biography ==
Kennedy-Skipton was born on 31 August 1898 in Cheltenham, England, and was educated at Trinity College, Dublin. Aged 23 years, he traveled from Liverpool to Hong Kong on the blue funnel liner SS Pyrrhus on 31 December 1921 and joined the cadet service of the Hong Kong colonial government. He worked in various departments, including District Officer, Magistrate, Senior Assistant Treasurer, Food Controller from 1940 to 1941 and secretary of the Sanitary Board. He was also a senior officer in the Secretariat for Chinese Affairs, in charge of the District Watch, labour affairs and Mui Tsai suppression. He was promoted a class 1 officer in January 1940 and was chairman of the Urban Council in 1940.

He married Helen Tow, an American woman of Scandinavian descent who was born on 15 October 1892 to a Quaker family in Iowa. The couple had two daughters, Anne Laetitia Daphne (b. 1930) and Enid Conolly (b. 1933). He had also a Chinese mistress and a son named Kimmy S. Kennedy-Skipton (later known as Henry). Before the Battle of Hong Kong when Hong Kong fell into Japanese hands in December 1941, Helen appealed to the Evacuation Advisory Committee against the compulsory evacuation order, which caused a heated exchange between the attorney general, Sir Grenville Alabaster, the colonial secretary Franklin Gimson and Kennedy-Skipton at the Prince's Building.

After the British surrender, Kennedy-Skipton lived with his family at his residence at No. 565 The Peak at the far end of Middle Gap Road. He was not interned like the rest of the colonial administrators as he claimed Irish nationality and he had also agreed to help the Japanese with the administration of night-soil collection, storage and conversion for use as a fertilizer for farmers in the New Territories among other things. For that he was accused of collaborating with the Japanese including the British Army Aid Group which reported that he had "gone over to the Japanese". He was sacked by Gimson in the Executive Council on 11 February 1942 for disobeying orders to cease co-operating with the Japanese and refusing to report to the Stanley Camp for internment with other government officials. For the next ten years, Kennedy-Skipton tried to appeal against the decision, to clear his name and seek compensation for lost salary.

In January 1943, Kennedy-Skipton escaped to Free China leaving his wife and two children in occupied Hong Kong until they were repatriated to the United Kingdom following liberation on the MV Highland Monarch, arriving in Southampton on 9 November 1945, while George Stacey returned in Hong Kong in 1947. He defended himself in a private enquiry in 1948. A newspaper criticised the fact that the enquiry was held behind closed doors under the title of "The Strange Case of Mr. Kennedy-Skipton". He went on to the Court of Appeal which dismissed his case in 1951.

Kennedy-Skipton remained in Hong Kong and taught at Diocesan Boys School and later St Joan of Arc private school. He ran in the 1952 Urban Council election but failed to win a seat. He was a member of the executive committee of the Democratic Self-Government Party of Hong Kong, the first political party calling for self-government and Hong Kong independence. In 1964, he formed the Labour Party of Hong Kong with other Democratic Self-Government Party members such as Tang Hon-tsai and K. Hopkin-Jenkins, a socialist party which called for self-government and common ownership, and became the party secretary. He ran again in the 1967 Urban Council election for the Labour Party and was again not elected. He returned to the United Kingdom in the 1970s and died in Scotland in 1982 at the age of 84.
