= Lam Shuk-yee =

Hong Kong politician

The Honourable Lam Shuk-yee GBM GBS
- 林淑儀
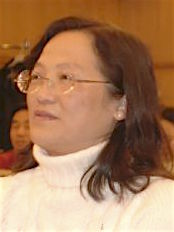

President of the Hong Kong Federation of Trade Unions
- In office 26 April 2012 – 16 April 2018
- Preceded by: Cheng Yiu-tong
- Succeeded by: Ng Chau-pei

Member of the National Committee of the Chinese People's Political Consultative Conference
- Incumbent
- Assumed office 2008

Personal details
- Born: June 1953 (age 72) Hong Kong
- Party: Hong Kong Federation of Trade Unions
- Spouse: Wong Ting-kwong
- Occupation: Trade unionist

Lam Shuk-yee
- Traditional Chinese: 林淑儀
- Simplified Chinese: 林淑仪
Transcriptions
Standard Mandarin
- Hanyu Pinyin: Lín Shūyí
Yue: Cantonese
- Jyutping: lam4 suk6 ji4

Lam Shuk-yee GBM GBS (Chinese: 林淑儀; born June 1953) is the former President of the Hong Kong Federation of Trade Unions (FTU), the most powerful trade union in Hong Kong. She is also current member of the National Committee of the Chinese People's Political Consultative Conference (CPPCC).

== Biography ==
Lam was born in 1953. She was aided by leftist union during his father's illness and she was young and joined the Hong Kong and Kowloon Federation of Trade Unions in 1968 as an electronic factory worker. She was the Vice-President of the Hong Kong Federation of Trade Unions (FTU) before in April 2012 when she succeeded Cheng Yiu-tong, the long-serving head of the unions, to become the first female President of the FTU. She is also member of the Chinese People's Political Consultative Conference (CPPCC) since 2008.

In April 2018, she stepped down as the President of the FTU and was succeeded by Ng Chau-pei.

In November 2020, following the expulsion of 4 pro-democracy lawmakers from the Legislative Council, Lam said it was necessary that the NPCSC decision was made.

== Personal life ==
Lam is married to Wong Ting-kwong, the Democratic Alliance for the Betterment and Progress of Hong Kong Legislative Councillor.

Political offices
Preceded by Cheng Yiu-tong	President of the Hong Kong Federation of Trade Unions; 2012–2018	Succeeded by Ng Chau-pei
