= Socialist Action (Hong Kong) =

Trotskyist political organisation in Hong Kong

Socialist Action 社會主義行動
- Chairperson: Sally Tang Mei-ching
- Founded: July 2010
- Newspaper: Socialist
- Ideology: Communism; Socialism (HK); Marxism; Trotskyism
- Political position: Far-left
- International affiliation: International Socialist Alternative
- Regional affiliation: Pro-democracy camp
- Colours: Red

Website
- www.socialism.hk

Socialist Action
- Traditional Chinese: 社會主義行動
- Simplified Chinese: 社会主义行动
Transcriptions
Standard Mandarin
- Hanyu Pinyin: Shèhuìzhǔyì Xíngdòng
Yue: Cantonese
- Jyutping: se^{5} wui^{6*2} zyu^{2} ji^{6} hang^{4} dung^{6}

Socialist Action (Chinese: 社會主義行動) is a Trotskyist political organisation in Hong Kong. It is affiliated with International Socialist Alternative (ISA) and works closely with the ISA sections in China and Taiwan. It describes itself as being based on the method and analysis of Marxism, to politically re-arm and organise the working class in the fight for a socialist world. They oppose the Chinese Communist Party, which they claim has made China the 'Sweatshop of the World' with one of the most extreme wealth gaps on the planet. They stand for the creation of fighting independent trade unions by Chinese workers to fight against capitalist exploitation and authoritarian rule.

Socialist Action criticises the approach of the main pan-democratic opposition parties in Hong Kong, which they claim to be incapable of success. Socialist Action plays a role in workers' strikes, environmental protests and campaigns for migrants' rights.

== Origins ==
Socialist Action was founded in 2010 by young activists involved in the 2010 Hong Kong by-election (五區公投/五區總辭) campaign for universal suffrage which followed the resignation of 5 pro-democracy lawmakers from Hong Kong's Legislative Council. While supporting the general aims of this movement against the Hong Kong government's limited electoral reform proposals, Socialist Action campaigned behind the slogan "Realise democracy – Kick out the capitalists!" This was "to raise the flag of socialism and explain why the struggle for democratic rights must challenge capitalism in order to succeed."

In addition to supporting the movement's main demands for abolition of the legislature's elite-based functional constituencies and election of Hong Kong's Chief Executive by universal suffrage, Socialist Action also called for the lowering of the voting age to 16, the right of migrants to vote, for legislators to receive only a skilled workers' wage, and for the Legislative Council to be replaced by "People's Assembly".

The magazine Socialist (社會主義者) was started in 2009 by mainland Chinese activists as an underground publication which is banned by the Chinese authorities. From 2010 Socialist Action began joint production of the magazine which is not banned in Hong Kong. Since 2011 a Taiwan edition of the magazine has also been produced.

== Umbrella Revolution and democracy struggle ==
Socialist Action participated in the 2014 Umbrella Revolution movement.

=== Opinion on the movement ===
Socialist Action argued that while mass occupy movements were a good way to begin mobilising a mass movement, this would not by itself be enough to force the Chinese government to concede free elections in Hong Kong. Socialist Action was the first organisation in Hong Kong to raise the demand for school strikes as a weapon in the democracy struggle. Socialist Action had argued in meetings and rallies in the year-and-a-half preceding the mass movement that school strikes should be built upon by escalating to workers' strikes and other forms of mass civil disobedience. Socialist Action believe the spontaneous nature of the movement is insufficient to carry the movement to victory, and it is necessary for democratic control of the movement by its grassroots activists, as well as a much clearer strategy to link the democratic struggle in Hong Kong with growing anti-government sentiment in China.

Socialist Action also stress the link between democratic demands and economic struggles over soaring rents, stagnating wages, and the lack of a universal pension system and standard working hours in Hong Kong. They believe the fight for genuine universal suffrage cannot be separated from the fight against the capitalist elite which controls economic and political decision-making. During and indeed long before the Umbrella Revolution erupted, Socialist Action criticised the mainstream pan democratic politicians and their NGO allies for being "tied politically to the coat tails of the capitalist class". Given the capitalists' support and acceptance of the current dictatorial system in China, from which they benefit economically, Socialist Action argues that those parties and groups with a pro-capitalist political outlook limit themselves to demanding very partial democratic reforms and refuse to call for the overthrow of the CCP dictatorship or for extending the democracy struggle into China. In June 2014, when Civic Party lawmaker Ronny Tong Ka-wah launched a proposal to 'democratise' the nomination committee, which Beijing is insisting upon as a means to vet election candidates for the post of Chief Executive, Socialist Action denounced this as "another rotten compromise attempt" and staged protests at a meeting called by Tong and attended by mainland officials.

=== Democratic committees ===
Socialist Action also took issue with what it claimed was too little internal democracy within the Umbrella Movement, accusing the pan democratic leaders of "imposing their undemocratic 'small circle' model of leadership upon protest movements in Hong Kong." They called for democratic grassroots' committees to be set up inside the occupation movement and for all discussions on tactics and political demands to be conducted through such democratic structures. Socialist Action's campaign for internal democracy within the Umbrella Movement took a major turn when the leaders of the Occupy Central campaign tried to organise an online referendum inside the occupations. This followed televised talks between the Hong Kong government and student representatives on 21 October 2014. The proposed online referendum, which was initially supported by the leaders of the Federation of Students, included a question on whether to accept or reject the government's offer of a 'supplementary report' to Beijing, something many considered to be an insignificant gesture. Socialist Action campaigned vigorously against the proposed referendum saying it was a misuse of 'democracy' within the movement and a manoeuvre to call off the protests, a position that was widely reported in the Hong Kong media. The referendum was killed off by mass pressure from the occupiers, with the student leaders withdrawing their support.

=== National Education struggle ===
Many of the controversies that emerged during the Umbrella Movement such as which forms of struggle are most effective and the need for genuine internal democracy were also raised two years earlier in the mass movement against 'school brainwashing', the popular name for the government's Moral and national education plan. These mass protests culminated in a weeklong occupation outside the Government Headquarters in Tamar in September 2012. Socialist Action was the only organisation that proposed a city-wide school strike as a means to escalate the protests. Student members of Socialist Action launched a 'City-wide School Strike Campaign' to propagate this idea. The Tamar occupation was abruptly called off by its leading group – a coalition of NGOs and representatives of the Professional Teachers' Union. This in the opinion of Socialist Action was another example of insufficient democratic discussion and lack of grassroots control through democratic structures. The City-wide School Strike Campaign was the only force in the movement that openly criticised the way the movement was called off, arguing that a full victory could have been achieved instead of settling for the government's partial retreat over this issue.

== Political views ==
Socialist Action members are active in many campaigns against state repression and to defend the rights of political dissidents including several of their own members who have been persecuted by the Chinese state. In October 2011 Socialist Action members helped the young mainland Chinese dissident Zhang Shujie to escape from China and seek asylum in Sweden. Zhang, a regular contributor to their underground magazine 'Socialist' (社会主义者) and the chinaworker.info website, was arrested as part of the major crackdown of 2011, which followed the fall of the governments in Tunisia and Egypt in the aftermath of the Arab Spring. Zhang faced the danger of a long prison term on charges of "contact with a banned organisation" and "crimes related to national security" (a very common accusation against critics of the Chinese Communist Party). Zhang revealed to a seminar in the Swedish parliament in 2012 that public security officials in Chongqing offered him his freedom in return for passing on information about other left-wing activists. The police paid for him to visit a Socialist Action conference in Hong Kong in October 2011 but instead of spying on the participants, the visit was used to organise his escape. The Stockholm parliamentary seminar was attended by Hong Kong legislator 'Long Hair' Leung Kwok-hung who also actively assisted Zhang Shujie's escape from China.

=== Supporting workers' struggles ===
Socialist Action campaigns for the rights of working-class people by giving practical assistance, solidarity, and tactical proposals to workers' struggles. Before Hong Kong introduced a statutory minimum wage in 2011, a move fiercely resisted by employers' organisations, Socialist Action actively campaigned for the minimum wage to be set at HK$33 per hour and called for a mass recruitment drive to strengthen unionism in notorious low-wage sectors such as the retail and catering industries. In a widely criticised move, the government set the minimum wage at the low level of HK$28 per hour. Due to the effects of inflation and especially higher housing costs, Socialist Action in 2015 argued for the minimum wage to be raised to HK$45 per hour, compared to the government set level of HK$32.50.

In the 40-day strike of Hong Kong dockworkers in 2013 which challenged Li Ka-Shing's business empire, Socialist Action collected 36,000 Hong Kong dollars for the strikers. They proposed specific actions to strengthen the strikes’ effectiveness and go beyond the limited, largely media-centred concept of struggle favoured by union officials. Socialist Action has consistently supported strike action by workers in pursuit of their rights such as the high-speed railway construction workers' strike in August 2013, the strike by transport workers at Swire Coca-Cola HK in October 2013, the Lohas Park construction workers' strike also in 2013, and strikes by lifeguards at public beaches and swimming pools in July and September 2014. Socialist Action stresses the need to abolish the outsourcing system, a root cause of low wages and poor worker protection, and urges workers to actively transform their unions into fighting organisations in defence of workers' rights. On several occasions Socialist Action has organised solidarity actions to raise support for mainland Chinese workers such as during the Yue Yuen footwear workers' strikes of 2014, in Guangdong province, which were the largest factory stoppages in China for three decades. In the autumn of 2013 international protests were organised to demand the release from detention of Shenzhen workers' representative Wu Guijun. In close coordination with its sister organisations of the Committee for a Workers' International, Socialist Action and the chinaworker.info website organised protests at Chinese embassies in 13 cities around the world from Sydney, Australia to Bangalore, India. Wu was released in June 2014 in what was an important and rare victory for China's fledgling independent workers' movement.

Other campaigns by Socialist Action include a series of protests in 2013–14 against the decision to open Sai Yeung Choi Street in Mong Kok to all-day traffic thus ending its status as a pedestrian haven with live music, cultural performances, and open air political meetings. In 2013, Socialist Action also actively campaigned against the persecution of schoolteacher Lam Wai Sze who became the target of a hate campaign by pro-government groups after her protests against harassment of other organisations were caught on camera and went viral on social media. Socialist Action organised protests at the Education Bureau against threats to take disciplinary action against Lam.

=== Women's rights, against discrimination ===
Socialist Action actively supports women's struggles such as the protests by Hong Kong's migrant domestic workers against discrimination and violence (as highlighted by the case of Erwiana Sulistyaningsih) and to abolish the iniquitous recruitment agencies which charge these workers extortionate and illegal fees. Every year on 8 March, Socialist Action has hosted a manifestation in Causeway Bay involving women from different nationalities to reclaim International Women's Day as a day of struggle for women's rights and against the patriarchal capitalist system. Women in Hong Kong are discriminated by government policies that favour the tycoons and despite politicians' talk of greater equality, average wages for women are 30 percent lower than men's. Housewives are not protected under the current pay-as-you-earn pension system and the government refuses to provide a basic pension system, even though it holds more than HK$700 billion in accumulated budget reserves.

Socialist Action has also been an active supporter and participant in the annual Slutwalk HK protests against sexism and victim blaming. A 2013 survey showed 50 percent of Hong Kong female students report being sexually harassed in schools, and 25 percent of women have faced domestic violence. Socialist Action argues that the right-wing political establishment, corporate media, and the state – senior judges and police chiefs – reinforce gender oppression and promote ideas to constrain women's rights and freedoms. Likewise, Socialist Action has an active record in opposing homophobia and fighting for the rights of LGBT people, whose struggle against oppression and discrimination has a long way to go in Hong Kong.

=== Democratic socialism ===
According to Socialist Action, Socialists and Marxists have always been to the fore in mass struggles for democratic rights, subscribing to Lenin's view that "Democracy is indispensable to socialism". Socialist Action argues that the one-party 'communist' dictatorships of Stalin, Mao, and their successors, were a million miles removed from genuine socialism and communism despite the fact that those bureaucratically distorted regimes rested on state-owned economies and a form of planning. Socialist Action insists that real democracy cannot be won within the confines of capitalism, which everywhere including in the most developed 'Western democracies' means the control of politics by unelected billionaires and big corporations. Capitalism therefore means dictatorship – either by openly authoritarian regimes (as in China, Singapore and Saudi Arabia) or by the financial markets (as in the capitalist 'democracies'). The alternative, according to Socialist Action, is genuine socialism with a democratically run and publicly owned economy that can be planned to meet the needs of the population. This would involve the mass of citizens as workers and consumers in democratic decision-making and taking control over society's resources.

=== A new mass workers' party ===
Socialist Action points to the need for new mass working class parties on a world scale, as the political vehicles needed to organise successful mass struggle and win support for a socialist programme against capitalism and dictatorship. They are cognisant of complex and contradictory political moods running through all layers of society at the present time. They see this as a legacy of the political confusion caused by the collapse of the Stalinist one-party states that falsely claimed to be 'socialist', and the metamorphosis of the old social democratic parties which have lost their former working-class roots to become outright capitalist parties.

== Opposing racism and nationalism ==
=== Right of abode for migrant workers ===
The growing threat of racist and nationalist divisions has been a major issue for Socialist Action, reflected in many of its campaigns. In 2011 it organised counter-protests together with Filipino migrant women against marches sponsored by the pro-government group Caring Hong Kong Power that targeted Asian migrants and opposed granting the right of abode. Socialist Action declared its opposition to Hong Kong's highly discriminatory policies against Asian migrants and called for the right of abode to apply equally as for other nationalities. They urged Hong Kong people not to be swayed by the racists' campaign and called for united working class struggle for higher wages, more affordable housing and an expansion of public services. While most political parties in Hong Kong have either opposed the right of abode for migrants or tried to evade the issue for fear of losing votes, Socialist Action's candidate in the 2011 District Council elections (Un Chau and So Uk constituency of Sham Shui Po District), Sally Tang Mei-ching, issued an election leaflet: 'The truth about the right of abode issue'. This stated that "racism is a threat to all working people regardless of nationality – we must unite against it."

=== Nativists and Anti-Mainlander Sentiment ===
In 2012 Socialist Action together with Youth Against Racism organised a demonstration at Lingnan University to protest against a full-page advertisement in Apple Daily newspaper that portrayed mainland Chinese people as "locusts". Socialist Action argued that the increasingly vocal nativist movement in Hong Kong and some sections of the pro-government camp have scapegoated mainlanders as the root cause of Hong Kong's social problems such as overstretched healthcare and social services, soaring housing costs and overcrowded public transportation. While recognising these problems as severe and disproportionately affecting the poorest sections of Hong Kong society, Socialist Action argued it is the economic rule of the billionaires and their extreme neo-liberal policies (outsourcing, privatisation and deregulation) that in turn have led to housing market speculation, shortages, and a decline in public services. To counter the arguments of nativist groups, Socialist Action calls for democratic control over the border, tourism, and housing policies, and public ownership of the banks and major conglomerates along with an end to privatisation and outsourcing of public services – political change that can only be achieved through united struggle of working people of all ethnicities.

=== Refugees ===
In 2014 Socialist Action gave active support to the campaign of the Refugee Union, a group formed to fight for the rights of asylum seekers in Hong Kong. Together with Socialist Action the Refugee Union activists staged a well-organised and peaceful six-month-long occupation in Central (close to IFC) to demand the government cancels its contract with welfare operator International Social Services (ISS). ISS has attracted massive criticism over its perceived high-handedness and failure to fully meet its contractual obligations in respect of rent and food allowances to refugees who are banned from working in Hong Kong. Following a long campaign, the government (Social Welfare Department) made significant concessions to the Refugee Union's demands in early 2015. These included replacing the widely criticised food parcels with a coupon system. On 29 January 2015, a deadly fire broke out in the New Territories at a former pig farm converted into slum housing for refugees under an ISS-supported programme. Sri Lankan asylum seeker Sivarajah Sivatharan was killed in the fire, a tragedy that reignited debate over the Hong Kong government's cruel policies towards refugees. Socialist Action joined with Refugee Union members in a protest outside the Social Welfare Department offices in Wan Chai to demand policy changes after the fire.

== Controversies ==
The pro-Beijing newspaper, Ta Kung Pao, ran a front-page attack on Socialist Action and League of Social Democrats legislator Leung Kwok-hung in its edition of 10 June 2014. The article accused the Committee for a Workers' International, to which Socialist Action is affiliated, of "ultra left and violent methods" and of "fomenting riots" in Brazil, Sweden and Turkey. Socialist Action disputed the allegations and argued that CWI sections were not instigators of riots and oppose rioting as a blind, desperate form of protest, and that CWI organises mass struggle around clear working class and socialist demands. Ta Kung Pao also claimed that Socialist Action cooperates with Civic Passion, a right-wing nativist group. Socialist Action rejected the claims, and replied to these allegations in an article that stated,"Ta Kung Pao's concern over violence is worthy of an 'Oscar' given its silence over the military massacre of protesters in Beijing in 1989... [this] is part of a wider CCP propaganda offensive to discredit the most radical sections of the democracy struggle."

Socialist Action has also faced accusations from nativist groups spread widely on social media that it collects funds improperly by running campaign stalls and by selling its magazine at demonstrations. Socialist Action has rebutted these allegations and points out that many other political groups, particularly in the pro-democracy camp, also raise funds at demonstrations. Their critics have complained that Socialist Action appeals for donations on "too many issues" – ranging from opposition to war in the Middle East to women's rights and press freedom. In response, Socialist Action replied that as an internationalist and socialist organisation, the group does not have a Hong Kong-only agenda, but fights alongside socialists in other countries against what they view as capitalist oppression around the world. "We won't accept any corporate or government funding – not from China or the US... We want to build a new fighting democracy movement with a mass working class political party at its core. This also means our attitude to raising money is different. We raise money from grassroots supporters and through spreading a socialist magazine," the organisation said.

== Performance in elections ==
=== District Council elections ===
Election	Number of popular votes	% of popular votes	Total elected seats	+/−
2015	1,152	0.08	0 / 431	0
