= Employee's Rights to Representation, Consultation and Collective Bargaining Ordinance =

Legislation of Hong Kong

Minimum Wage Ordinance

Legislative Council of Hong Kong
- Long title: An Ordinance to provide for the rights of employees to representation, consultation and collective bargaining; and to provide for matters incidental thereto or connected therewith.
- Citation: Cap. 530
- Enacted by: Legislative Council of Hong Kong
- Commenced: 30 June 1997
- Repealed: 30 October 1997

Legislative history
- Introduced by: Hon Lee Cheuk-yan
- Introduced: 4 April 1997
- First reading: 10 April 1997
- Second reading: 26 June 1997
- Third reading: 26 June 1997
- Status: Repealed

The Employee's Rights to Representation, Consultation and Collective Bargaining Ordinance (Chinese: 僱員代表權、諮詢權及集體談判權條例) is a repealed law of Hong Kong to grant rights of employees to representation, consultation and collective bargaining, with incidental or connected matters. It was introduced by trade unionist Lee Cheuk-yan in the colonial Legislative Council on the eve of the handover of Hong Kong in April 1997 but was soon repealed by the Provisional Legislative Council (PLC), in October 1997.

== Contents ==
The bill was introduced by the pro-labour legislator Lee Cheuk-yan of the Hong Kong Confederation of Trade Unions (CTU). Under the bill, employees were granted the right to representation and consultation through a trade union representative and to be covered by a collective agreement negotiated by a "representative" trade union. Additionally, a trade union could seek employer recognition if its membership made up more than 15 percent of the employees and represented over 50 percent of these employees. Further provisions included the establishment of collective bargaining and the imposition on employers of a duty to allow trade union representatives paid time-off for representation, consultation and collective bargaining activities.

The Labour Department, employers and the pro-Beijing Hong Kong Federation of Trade Unions (FTU) and the Federation of Hong Kong and Kowloon Labour Unions (FLU) opposed the bill, mainly on the grounds that collective bargaining was not a tradition in Hong Kong where employers and labour enjoyed a "harmonious relationship".

The bill was passed by the Legislative Council on 20 June 1997 with the support of the pro-democracy camp in the council. It was gazetted on 30 June 1997, the last day of colonial rule.

== Repeal ==
After the transfer of sovereignty over Hong Kong, the ordinance was first frozen by the Provisional Legislative Council (PLC) on 17 July 1997 on the basis of the review of the Labour Advisory Board (LAB), a tripartite body appointed by Chief Executive Tung Chee-hwa. A majority of the LAB members deemed it inappropriate to implement collective bargaining. It was frozen with three of the six other ordinances passed by the colonial Legislative Council as private members' bills, also on the ground that these laws were hastily passed during the last week of the legislature in June 1997 without adequate discussion in bill committees and public consultation.

On 30 October, the ordinance was repealed by the Employment and Labour Relations (Miscellaneous Amendments) Ordinance, along with the Employment (Amendment) (No. 4) Ordinance 1997 passed by the Legislative Council on 29 June 1997.

It became the subject of the labour issue in Hong Kong in which the pro-democrats used it as an attack on the FTU, which supported the repeal of collective bargaining.

== See also ==
- Hong Kong Bill of Rights Ordinance
- Minimum Wage Ordinance
