= Chan Yiu-choi =

Hong Kong trade unionist

Chan Yiu-choi (Chinese: 陳耀材; 1901–1988) or Chan Yiu-choy, was a Hong Kong trade unionist and the first President of the Hong Kong and Kowloon Federation of Trade Unions (HKFTU) from 1957 to 1980.

Chan was born in Hong Kong to a working-class family in 1901. He was a sailor in his young age and participated in the Canton-Hong Kong strike of 1925. He joined the Hong Kong Tramways subsequently. He founded a trade union at the tramways and was active in fundraising for the war efforts after the Marco Polo Bridge Incident in 1937. He later became the chairman of the Hong Kong Tramways Workers Union in 1954.

Chan was one of the founding members of the Hong Kong and Kowloon Federation of Trade Unions (HKFTU) established in 1948. He became the 4th, 5th and 6th Deputy Chairman of the Federation between 1951 and 1953 and the 7th, 8th and 9th Chairman between 1954 and 1956. In 1957, he took over the presidency of the Federation until his retirement in 1980. He held the position as an advisor his death in 1988.

Chan was also appointed member of National Committee of the Chinese People's Political Consultative Conference (CPPCC) in 1978.

Political offices
Preceded by Chan Man-hon	Chairman of the Hong Kong Federation of Trade Unions; 1954–1956	Succeeded by Lee Sang
New title	President of the Hong Kong Federation of Trade Unions; 1957–1980	Succeeded by Yeung Kwong
