= Hong Kong Federation of Trade Unions =

Trade union federation in Hong Kong

Hong Kong Federation of Trade Unions 香港工會聯合會
- Abbreviation: HKFTU; FTU
- President: Ng Chau-pei
- Chairman: Kingsley Wong
- Secretary-General: Ma Kwong-yu
- Founded: 17 April 1948; 78 years ago
- Headquarters: 12 Ma Hang Chung; Road, Tokwawan, Kowloon, Hong Kong
- Membership (2020): ▲420,000+
- Ideology: Socialism (HK); Labourism; Left-conservatism; Chinese nationalism; Historical: Anti-imperialism; Direct democracy; Marxism
- Political position: Left-wing; Historical: Far-left
- National affiliation: All-China Federation of Trade Unions
- Regional affiliation: Pro-Beijing camp
- Colours: Red
- Slogan: Patriotism, Solidarity, Rights, Welfare, Participation
- Executive Council: 2 / 33
- Legislative Council: 7 / 90
- District Councils: 43 / 470
- NPC (HK deputies): 2 / 36
- CPPCC (HK members): 2 / 124

Website
- ftu.org.hk
- Politics of Hong Kong; Political parties; Elections; A: HKFTU is a left-wing socialist political party, but it is conservative in the political context of Hong Kong. B: HKFTU was the main opposition party that resisted colonialism during the British Hong Kong. HKFTU opposes the Chief Executive's direct election, but in the past supported Governor's direct election.

Hong Kong Federation of Trade Unions
- Traditional Chinese: 香港工會聯合會
- Simplified Chinese: 香港工会联合会
Transcriptions
Standard Mandarin
- Hanyu Pinyin: Xiānggǎng Gōnghuì Liánhéhuì
Yue: Cantonese
- Yale Romanization: Hēunggóng Gūngwuih Lyùhnhahpwuih
- Jyutping: Hoeng1gong2 Gung1wui6*2 Lyun4hap6wui6*2

Abbreviation
- Traditional Chinese: 工聯會
- Simplified Chinese: 工联会
Transcriptions
Standard Mandarin
- Hanyu Pinyin: Gōng Lián Huì
Yue: Cantonese
- Yale Romanization: Gūng Lyùhn Wuih
- Jyutping: Gung1 Lyun4 Wui6*2

The Hong Kong Federation of Trade Unions (HKFTU or FTU) is a pro-Beijing labour and political group established in 1948 in Hong Kong. It is the oldest and largest labour group in Hong Kong with over 420,000 members in 253 affiliates and associated trade unions. Presided by Ng Chau-pei and chaired by Kingsley Wong, it currently holds four seats in the Legislative Council and 43 seats in the District Councils.

The HKFTU has long been seen as a satellite organisation of the Chinese Communist Party (CCP), the ruling party of the People's Republic of China (PRC). It played a leading role in the 1967 riots against British rule in Hong Kong, which were suppressed by the colonial government. In the 1980s, the HKFTU, along with the conservative business elites, led efforts against faster democratisation during the run up to the Chinese resumption of sovereignty over Hong Kong in 1997.

HKFTU trade unionists were among the founding members of the Democratic Alliance for the Betterment and Progress of Hong Kong (DAB) in 1992, which has become the flagship pro-Beijing party today. In the early 2010s, the HKFTU began actively participating in elections under its own banner with a more pro-grassroots and pro-labour platform, distant from the DAB's pro-middle-class and professionals outlook, in order to broaden the pro-Beijing electorate.

== Policies ==
The HKFTU's motto is "patriotism, solidarity, rights, welfare and participation". The group focuses on the rights and welfare of workers, supporting workers in their negotiations with employers and helping them resolve labour disputes. It works to amend legislation to protect labour rights and prevent employers from exploiting loopholes in labour laws. It opposes immigrant labour and calls for legislation against age discrimination.

Politically, the HKFTU has been described as left-wing and socialist, but also conversely as pro-business and conservative. It supports the governments of the People's Republic of China and Hong Kong Special Administrative Region, and is affiliated with the All-China Federation of Trade Unions. It allied with the Hong Kong government on many issues but has a pro-grassroots stance on livelihood and labour issues, such as demanding more measures to reduce unemployment. Due to its government loyalist nature, industrial militancy has been remarkably absent from the HKFTU's action programme.

The HKFTU also operates five retail outlets which provide discounted goods and services to its members. Businesses include catering, credit card facilities, medical services, and travel agencies.

== History ==
=== Early years ===
The Hong Kong Federation of Trade Unions was founded by pro-CCP trade unionists in 1948 as the Hong Kong and Kowloon Federation of Trade Unions. At the same time, the pro-Kuomintang Hong Kong and Kowloon Trades Union Council (TUC) was set up as a rival organisation. This was all done in the midst of the Chinese Civil War between the Communists and Nationalists in mainland China. The HKFTU was registered as non-union "friendly societies" under the Societies Ordinance in order to avoid the restrictive provision in the newly introduced Trade Union Registration Ordinance of 1948.

During the 1950s and 1960s, the HKFTU functioned as industrially based "friendly societies" or craft-based fraternities and provided benefits and other supplementary aids to the veteran members who was under the threats of unemployment and low pay. It contested with the TUC in industries, trades, and workplaces under the left-right ideological divide of that period.

The relations between the HKFTU and the colonial government remained tense. Union activities were under strict regulation by the government. Inspired by the Cultural Revolution, the HKFTU escalated labour disputes into the 1967 riots against British colonial rule. Many labour activists and HKFTU cadres were imprisoned and deported. Due to its campaign of violence and bomb attacks, the HKFTU suffered serious setbacks in both public esteem and official tolerance. During the riots, the HKFTU also boycotted participation in any officially appointed consultative bodies by the colonial government until Beijing's Communist government adopted the reform and opening up in the late 1970s.

=== Transition to 1997 ===
In the background of the 1980s, amidst shifts in the political economy of mainland China and negotiations on Hong Kong's political status after 1997, the HKFTU readjusted its policy toward the colonial government. The electoral reform introduced by the government also gave trade unions access to political power. In the first Legislative Council election in 1985, candidates from the HKFTU and the TUC ran uncontested in the two newly created seats in the Labour functional constituency. One such candidate was Tam Yiu-chung of the HKFTU, who served as the member of the Legislative Council for the Labour functional constituency until 1995, when he was succeeded by Cheng Yiu-tong.

On the other hand, as the most massive grassroots organ of the pro-Beijing bloc, the HKFTU also led efforts to resist the pre-1997 attempts at democratisation. It opposed the possible direct Legislative Council election of 1988 with the slogan, "Hong Kong workers only want meal tickets, not electoral ballots." However, during the Hong Kong Basic Law drafting process from 1985 to 1990, the HKFTU had to repudiate its demands on the rights to union recognition and collective bargaining in the Consultative and Drafting Committees dominated by tycoons. The HKFTU's devotion to Beijing and its collaboration with the conservative business interests were challenged by some leftist unionists.

In the beginning of the 1990s, the HKFTU became more involved in politics to counter the growing influence of pro-democracy parties such as the United Democrats of Hong Kong (later transformed into the Democratic Party) and its ally the Hong Kong Confederation of Trade Unions (HKCTU). Chan Yuen-han ran as the HKFTU candidate in the 1991 Legislative Council direct election but was defeated by Lau Chin-shek, a pro-democracy labour activist representing the United Democrats of Hong Kong. In 1992, the first pro-Beijing political party, the Democratic Alliance for the Betterment of Hong Kong (DAB), was co-founded by HKFTU members. HKFTU began mobilising its supporters to vote for DAB candidates in the Legislative Council elections.

=== Since handover ===
After the transfer of sovereignty over Hong Kong in 1997, the HKFTU's representatives joined the Beijing-controlled Provisional Legislative Council to roll back several pre-handover labour rights laws passed in spring 1997 by the colonial legislature controlled by the pro-democracy camp, which included the collective bargaining right under the Employee's Rights to Representation, Consultation and Collective Bargaining Ordinance. The Provisional Legislative Council also enacted new electoral rules to disenfranchise some 800,000 blue-, gray- and white-collar workers in the nine functional constituencies created from Chris Patten's electoral reform. The number of eligible voters in the Labour functional constituency was reduced from 2,001 qualified union officials in 1995 to only 361 unions on a one-vote-per-union basis for the first SAR elections in 1998.

The HKFTU has been a vocal supporter of the central government in Beijing and the Hong Kong SAR government; its then-president Cheng Yiu-tong was appointed as a non-official member of the Executive Council from 2002 to 2017. During the early years of the SAR administration, HKFTU members ran in direct elections under the banner of its sister organisation DAB. Since the 2008 Legislative Council elections, HKFTU members Chan Yuen-han and Wong Kwok-hing have run independently from DAB, under a more grassroots and pro-labour rights agenda. In the 2011 District Council election, the HKFTU ran 20 candidates entirely on its own, winning 11 seats. In the 2012 Legislative Council elections, the HKFTU filled candidates in four of the five geographical constituencies and veteran Chan Yuen-han contested in the territory-wide District Council (Second) constituency, becoming the fourth largest political group in the legislature.

In the 2015 District Council election, the HKFTU had 29 candidates elected (two under both DAB and HKFTU banners). Its Legislative Council seats dropped from six to five in the 2016 Legislative Council election as veteran Wong Kwok-hing failed to retain his District Council (Second) seat. Nevertheless, the HKFTU remained the third-largest political group in the 6th Legislative Council (2016–2021).

The HKFTU suffered a major defeat in the 2019 District Council election, which was held amidst the 2019 protests, retaining only five of their previous 26 seats.

In August 2022, after Nancy Pelosi visited Taiwan, the HKFTU staged a protest at the US Consulate General in Hong Kong, and said the United States "must pay full responsibility for playing with fire."

== Finances ==
In August 2018, the pro-democracy tabloid Apple Daily reported that the HKFTU had total assets of about $250 million Hong Kong dollars. From 2015 to 2017, the HKFTU accumulated an income of $380 million, including $242 million from an unknown donor. The HKFTU also allegedly avoided paying $39.2 million in profits tax by transferring $24.7 million to a company.

== Election results ==
=== Legislative Council elections ===
Election	Number of popular votes	% of popular votes	GC seats	FC seats	EC seats	Total seats	+/−	Position
1991	44,894	3.28	0	1	0	1 / 60	Steady	—N/a
1995	DAB ticket		0	1	0	1 / 60	Steady	—N/a
2000	DAB ticket		0	1	0	1 / 60	Steady	—N/a
2004	52,564	2.97	1	2		3 / 60	▲2	5th
2008	▲86,311	▲5.70	2	2		4 / 60	▲1	5th
2012	▲127,857	▲7.06	3	3		6 / 70	▲2	▲2nd
2016	▲169,854	▲7.83	3	2		5 / 70	▼1	▼5th
2021	▲192,235	▲14.53	3	2	3	8 / 90	▲3	▲2nd
2025	▲260,303	▲20.39	3	2	2	7 / 90	▼1	▼3rd

Note 1: Each voter got two votes in the 1991 election.

Note 2: Before 2008 the HKFTU had a joint-ticket with DAB.

=== District Council elections ===
Election	Number of popular votes	% of popular votes	D.E. seats	E.C. seats	App. seats	Total elected seats	+/−
1988	3,360	0.53	2		0	2 / 264	Steady
1991	▲6,229	▲1.17	4		0	4 / 272	▲2
1999	▼1,074	▼0.13	1		0	1 / 390	▼3
2003	▲2,766	▲0.26	0		0	0 / 400	▼1
2007	▲4,208	▲0.37	15		1	16 / 405	▲16
2011	▲36,646	▲3.10	24		1	25 / 412	▲9
2015	▲88,292	▲6.11	29			29 / 431	▲4
2019	▲128,796	▼4.39	5			5 / 452	▼24
2023	▲206,285	▲17.61	18	9	16	43 / 470	▲38

== Leadership ==
=== Presidents ===
- Chan Yiu-choi, 1957–1980
- Yeung Kwong, 1980–1988
- Lee Chark-tim, 1988–2000
- Cheng Yiu-tong, 2000–2012
- Lam Shuk-yee, 2012–2018
- Ng Chau-pei, 2018–present

=== Chairmen ===
- Chu King-man, 1948–1949
- Cheung Chun-nam, 1949–1951
- Chan Man-hon, 1951–1954
- Chan Yiu-choi, 1954–1957
- Lee Sang, 1957–1962
- Yeung Kwong, 1962–1980
- Poon Kwong-wai, 1980–1986
- Cheng Yiu-tong, 1986–2000
- Wong Kwok-kin, 2000–2009
- Ng Chau-pei, 2009–2018
- Kingsley Wong, 2018–present

== Representatives ==
=== Executive Council ===
- Ng Chau-pei

=== Legislative Council ===
Constituency	Member
Hong Kong Island East	Ng Chau-pei
Kowloon East	Tang Ka-piu
New Territories South West	Joephy Chan Wing-yan
Labour	Dennis Leung Tsz-wing
Labour	Kwok Wai-keung
Election Committee	Michael Luk Chung-hung
Election Committee	Kingsley Wong Kwok

=== District Councils ===
District	Constituency	Member
Central and Western	Appointed	Ben Lui Hung-pan
Wan Chai	Appointed	Lam Wai-kong
Eastern	Hong Wan	Ng Ching-ching
Eastern	Chai Wan	Stanley Ho Ngai-kam
Eastern	Appointed	Liang Li
Southern	Southern District Southeast	Chan Wing-yan
Southern	Southern District Northeast	Sophia Lam Wing-yan
Yau Tsim Mong	District Committees	Suen Chi-man
Yau Tsim Mong	Appointed	Hui Tak-leung
Kowloon City	Appointed	Felix Kwok Man-kwong
Wong Tai Sin	Wong Tai Sin East	Mabel Tam Mei-po
Wong Tai Sin	District Committees	Mok Kin-wing
Wong Tai Sin	Appointed	Anthony Yau Yiu-shing
Kwun Tong	Kwun Tong Southeast	Kan Ming-tung
Kwun Tong	Kwun Tong West	Tony Lee Ka-hang
Kwun Tong	District Committees	Ching Hoi-yan
Kwun Tong	District Committees	Wong Kai-shan
Kwun Tong	Appointed	Alan Yu Siu-lung
Tsuen Wan	Tsuen Wan Northwest	Kot Siu-yuen
Tuen Mun	Tuen Mun East	Ken Fung Pui-yin
Tuen Mun	Tuen Mun West	Simon Tsui Fang
Tuen Mun	District Committees	Leo Chan Manwell
Tuen Mun	Appointed	Tony Chan Yau-hoi
Tuen Mun	Appointed	Fung Yuk-fung
Yuen Long	Tin Shui Wai North	Yiu Kwok-wai
Yuen Long	District Committees	Lau Kwai-yung
Yuen Long	Appointed	Wong Hiu-shan
North	Robin's Nest	Ken Tsang King-chung
Tai Po	Appointed	Chan Yung-wa
Sai Kung	Tseung Kwan O South	James Wong Yuen-ho
Sai Kung	District Committees	Cheng Yu-hei
Sai Kung	Appointed	Wong Wang-to
Sha Tin	Sha Tin South	Koo Wai-ping
Sha Tin	District Committees	Janet Lee Ching-yee
Sha Tin	Appointed	Chan Sin-ming
Kwai Tsing	Tsing Yi	Pang Yap-ming
Kwai Tsing	Kwai Tsing East	Chau Kit-ying
Kwai Tsing	Kwai Tsing West	Chan On-ni
Kwai Tsing	District Committees	Lee Wai-lok
Kwai Tsing	Appointed	Lau Mei-lo
Kwai Tsing	Appointed	Au Chi-fai
Kwai Tsing	Appointed	So Pak-tsan
Islands	Islands	Lau Chin-pang

=== National People's Congress ===
- Cheng Yiu-tong
- Ng Chau-pei

=== Chinese People’s Political Consultative Conference ===
- Lam Shuk-yee
- Kingsley Wong

== See also ==
- Macau Federation of Trade Unions, equivalent organisation in Macau
- United Front (China)
- United Front Work Department
- Politics of Hong Kong
- Socialism in Hong Kong
