= Hongkong International Terminals =

Hong Kong container port operator

Hongkong International Terminals Limited 香港國際貨櫃碼頭有限公司
- Company type: Privately held company
- Industry: Container port operator
- Founded: 1969
- Headquarters: Hong Kong (SAR of China)
- Area served: Hong Kong
- Key people: Managing Director: Mr. Ivor Chow
- Parent: Hutchison Port Holdings Trust (100%)

Hongkong International Terminals Limited (HIT) (Chinese: 香港國際貨櫃碼頭) operates 12 berths in Terminal 4, 6, 7 and 9 (North) of Kwai Tsing Container Terminals and another four at Terminal 8 through a joint venture with COSCO SHIPPING Ports and Asia Container Terminals. HIT is the largest container terminal operator in Hong Kong.

HIT is a member of Hutchison Port Holdings Trust, the world's first container port business trust. HIT is also a part of Hutchison Ports' global network of port and logistics operations, and continues to have access to services and resources enjoyed by companies within the Hutchison Ports Group.

In 2005, Hutchison Whampoa sold 20% shares of HIT (including the 20% of 50% = 10% rights of Terminal 8 East) to PortCapital Ltd (a company that major shareholder was PSA International at that time). A year later, Hutchison Whampoa sold 20% shares of its wholly subsidiary Hutchison Port Holdings to PSA International.

In 2009, China Resources Holdings acquired 10% shares of HIT from its subsidiary China Resources Enterprise.

In 2013, the dock workers went on a strike in the container berths HIT for better pay and working conditions.

== See also ==
- 2013 Hong Kong dock strike
