= Union of Hong Kong Dockers =

Trade union in Hong Kong

UHKD
- Union of Hong Kong Dockers
- 香港碼頭業職工會
- Founded: 2006
- Headquarters: 7/F, Wing Wong Commercial Building, 557-559 Nathan Road, Kowloon
- Location: Hong Kong
- Members: 426
- Key people: Stanley Ho Wai-Hong, spokesman
- Affiliations: HKCTU–ITF

Union of Hong Kong Dockers
- Traditional Chinese: 香港碼頭業職工會
Transcriptions
Yue: Cantonese
- Yale Romanization: Hēung góng máh tàuh yihp jīk gūng wuih
- Jyutping: Hoeng^{1} gong^{2} maa^{5} tau^{4} jip^{6} zik^{1} gung^{1} wui^{6*2}

The Union of Hong Kong Dockers (UHKD) is an affiliate of the Hong Kong Confederation of Trade Unions (HKCTU).

It started off a dock strike in the container berths owned by Hong Kong International Terminals (HIT), the subsidiary of Hutchison Port Holdings Trust (HPHT) and Hutchison Whampoa Limited (HWL) in 2013.

== See also ==
- 2013 Hong Kong dock strike
- Hong Kong Confederation of Trade Unions
