= Labour Party of Hong Kong =

Labour Party of Hong Kong 香港工黨
- Chairman: Tang Hon-tsai; K. Hopkin-Jenkins
- Founded: 21 July 1964
- Dissolved: 1972
- Split from: Democratic Self-Government Party
- Ideology: Anti-colonialism; Democratic socialism Socialism
- Political position: Left-wing
- Colours: Red

Party flag

Labour Party of Hong Kong
- Traditional Chinese: 香港工黨
Transcriptions
Yue: Cantonese
- Yale Romanization: Hēung góng gūng dóng
- Jyutping: Hoeng1 gong2 gung1 dong2

Alternative Chinese name
- Traditional Chinese: 香港勞工黨
Transcriptions
Yue: Cantonese
- Yale Romanization: Hēung góng lòuh gūng dóng
- Jyutping: Hoeng1 gong2 lou4 gung1 dong2

The Labour Party of Hong Kong was a left-wing socialist political party that existed between 1964 and 1972 and called for self-government in Hong Kong and common ownership.

The party was established by two breakaway members from the Democratic Self-Government Party of Hong Kong, Tang Hon-tsai and K. Hopkin-Jenkins, and was joined by former civil servant G. S. Kennedy-Skipton as party secretary. It claimed to be defined by close association with the policies of Britain and the Commonwealth, and to be straightforwardly socialistic, by concerning itself with workers, and promoting welfare and common ownership.

== Election performance ==
=== Municipal elections ===
Election	Number of popular votes	% of popular votes	UrbCo seats
1967	1,262	3.16	0 / 10
