= Hong Kong Confederation of Trade Unions =

Hong Kong trade union and political party

Hong Kong Confederation of Trade Unions 香港職工會聯盟
- President: Pun Tin-chi
- Chairperson: Carol Ng
- General Secretary: Lee Cheuk-yan
- Founded: 29 July 1990
- Dissolved: 3 October 2021
- Headquarters: 19/F, Wing Wong; Building, 557–559; Nathan Road, Kowloon, Hong Kong
- Membership: 160,000
- Ideology: Labourism; Liberalism (HK); Social democracy
- Political position: Centre-left
- International affiliation: ITUC
- Regional affiliation: Pan-democracy camp
- Colours: Green

Website
- www.hkctu.org.hk

Hong Kong Confederation of Trade Unions
- Traditional Chinese: 香港職工會聯盟
Transcriptions
Yue: Cantonese
- Yale Romanization: Hēunggóng Jīkgūng Wuih Lyùhnmàhng
- Jyutping: Hoeng^{1}gong^{2} Zik^{1}gung^{1} Wui^{6*2} Lyun^{4}mang^{4}

The Hong Kong Confederation of Trade Unions (HKCTU) was a pro-democracy labour and political group in the Hong Kong. It was established on 29 July 1990. It had 160,000 members in 61 affiliates (mainly trade unions in various sectors) and representation in the Legislative Council of Hong Kong (LegCo) to challenge government policies and push for legal protection of worker and trade union rights. It was one of the two most influential labour groups in Hong Kong, with the other one being the pro-Beijing Hong Kong Federation of Trade Unions.

== Beliefs ==
The principles put forward by the HKCTU were "Solidarity, Rice Bowl, Justice and Democracy". The group focused on the rights and interests of workers, and the development of a democratic political system in Hong Kong. It called for the right to collective bargaining and protection against dismissals for involvement in trade union activities.

Besides calling for universal suffrage of the Chief Executive of Hong Kong and LegCo, the group also supported the pro-democracy movement in mainland China, including the struggle for independent trade unions. It participated in a number of human rights and labour rights networks to oppose the suppression of labour movements in mainland China.

== History ==
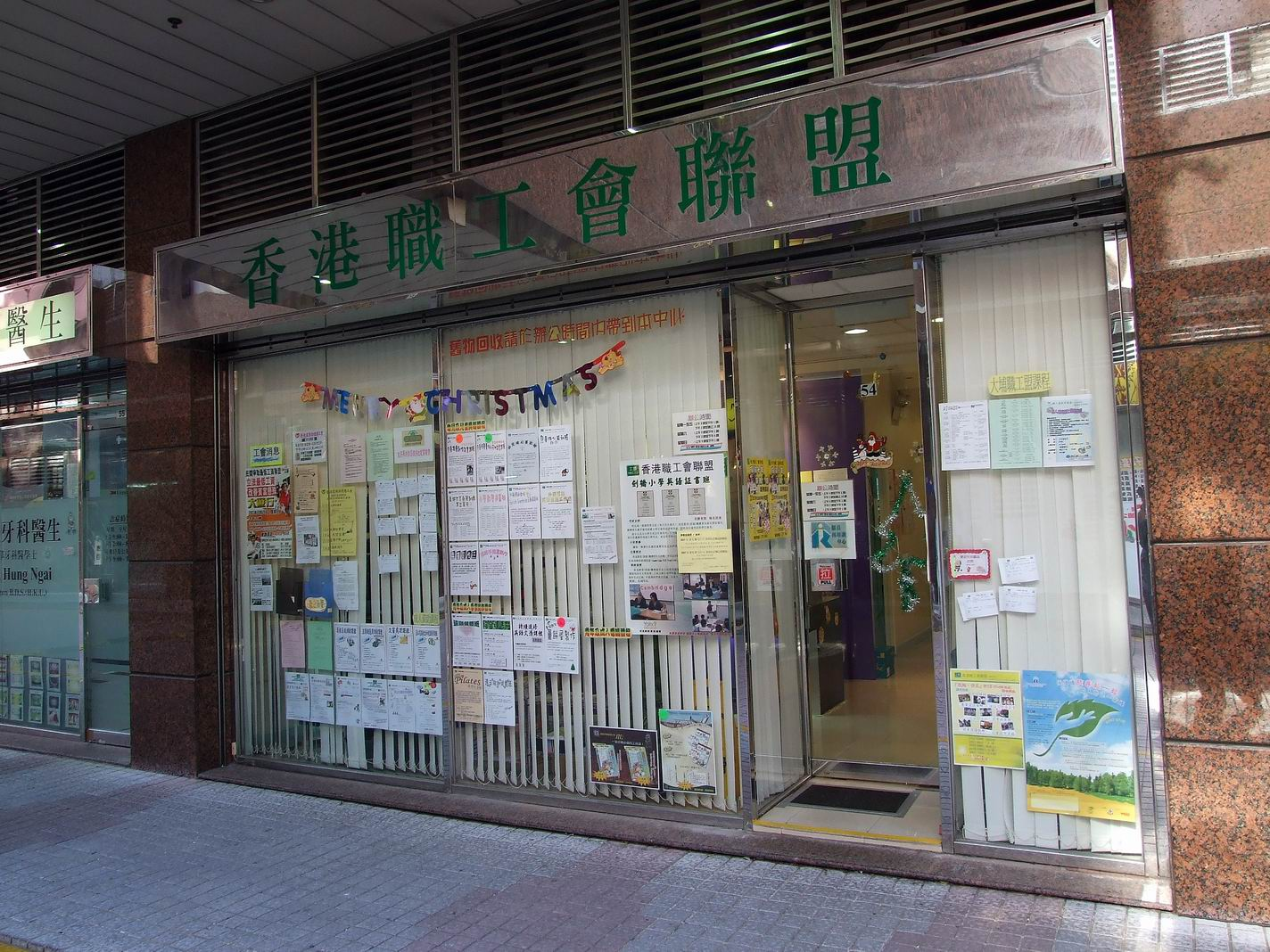
Training Centre in Ma On Shan

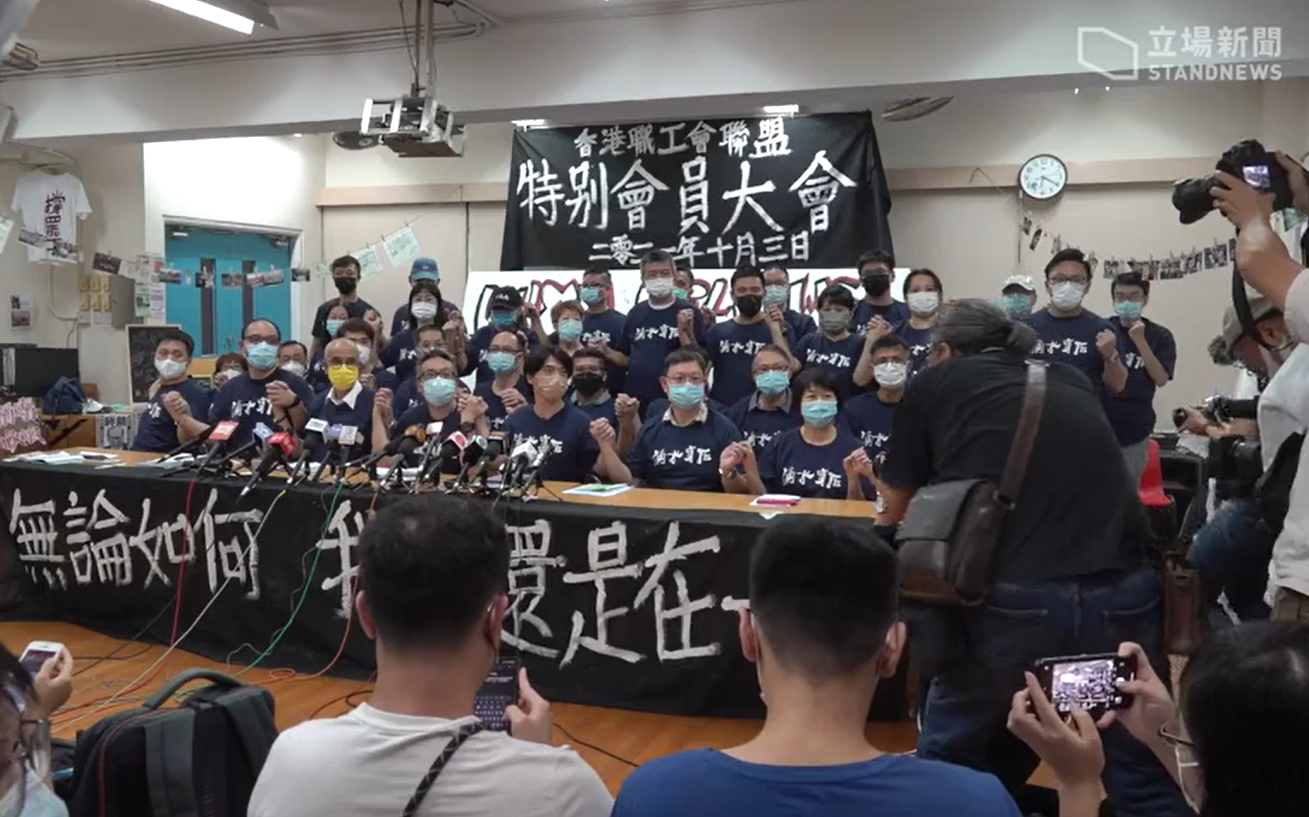
HKCTU members voted to disband the union on October 3, 2021

The HKCTU emerged from the Hong Kong Christian Industrial Committee (HKCIC), a church-sponsored labour organisation largely involved in the grassroots movements in the 1970s and 1980s. The Confederation was established in 1990 under the leadership of independent labour leader Lau Chin-shek. It was largely as a coalition of the independent and politically unaffiliated union organisations, most of which were new white-collar unions organising the civil service and professional or service employees in the public and subvented sectors, including the Hong Kong Professional Teachers' Union and the Hong Kong Social Workers General Union.

The HKCTU inherited the vanguard image and the more liberal sector in the territory's pluralistic union movement. It became a partner and an ally of the pro-democracy camp and the Democratic Party, in which Lau was the founding member. Lau Chin-shek won a seat in the 1991 LegCo direct election and Lee Cheuk-yan, the general secretary of the HKCTU, also won a seat in the 1995 LegCo election.

In 1993, HKCTU supported a strike by its affiliate Cathay Pacific Airways Flight Attendants Union (FAU). The strike, demanding a reduction of working hours from up to sixty-five hours per week and the reinstatement of three workers fired for refusing to work overtime, lasted for seventeen days and ended in victory.

Days before transfer of sovereignty in 1997, with the support of the pro-democracy camp, the HKCTU successfully established statutory rights of collective bargaining of labour unions, which mandate employers to negotiate with labour unions on issues such as salaries, welfare and working hours, by introducing the Employee's Rights to Representation, Consultation and Collective Bargaining Bill as Lee Cheuk-yan's private member's bill. But the laws were soon abolished by the pro-Beijing appointed Provisional Legislative Council shortly after the transfer of sovereignty.

Members of HKCTU were involved in organising a number of local protests, including the pivotal 2003 July 1 march to oppose the enactment of anti-sedition laws under Article 23 of the Basic Law (organised by the Civil Human Rights Front of which HKCTU is a member), and other protests to struggle for labour rights and democracy in Hong Kong and in mainland China.

In the 1998 LegCo election, the group was represented by Lau Chin-shek (also a member of Democratic Party and The Frontier) and Lee Cheuk-yan (also a member of The Frontier) in the legislative council (LegCo). In 2012, the HKCTU co-founded the Labour Party.

In 2013, HKCTU supported a strike by its affiliate Union of Hong Kong Dockers. After a forty-day strike, the workers achieved a 9.8 percent pay rise, meal breaks and promises that there would be no retaliation against the strikers.

HKCTU members voted to disband the union on October 3, 2021, following the 2019–2020 Hong Kong protests. At that time, co-founder and general secretary Lee Cheuk-yan was in jail for his involvement in the protests and chief executive Mung Siu Tat had announced on Facebook that he had left Hong Kong. At least 29 Hong Kong trade unions had already been dissolved throughout 2021.

== Notable affiliates ==
- Federation of Hong Kong and Kowloon Labour Unions
- Hong Kong Social Workers' General Union
- Hong Kong Professional Teachers' Union
- Hong Kong Federation of Domestic Workers Unions
- Union of Hong Kong Dockers

== Electoral performance ==
=== Legislative Council elections ===
Election	Number of popular votes	% of popular votes	GC seats	FC seats	EC seats	Total seats	+/−	Position
2000	96,752	7.33	2	0	0	2 / 60	0	5th▲
2004	113,304▲	6.40▼	2	0		2 / 60	0	4th▲
2008	42,366▼	2.80▼	1	0		1 / 70	1▼	—N/a
2012	Labour ticket		0	0		0 / 70	0▼	—N/a
2016	Labour ticket		0	0		0 / 70	0	—N/a

=== District Council elections ===
Election	Number of popular votes	% of popular votes	Total elected seats	+/−
2003	4,032	0.38	2 / 400	2▲
2007	2,273▼	0.20▼	0 / 405	2▼
2011	4,044▲	0.34▲	0 / 412	0

== See also ==
- 2019–20 Hong Kong protests
