= Lau Chin-shek =

- 劉千石
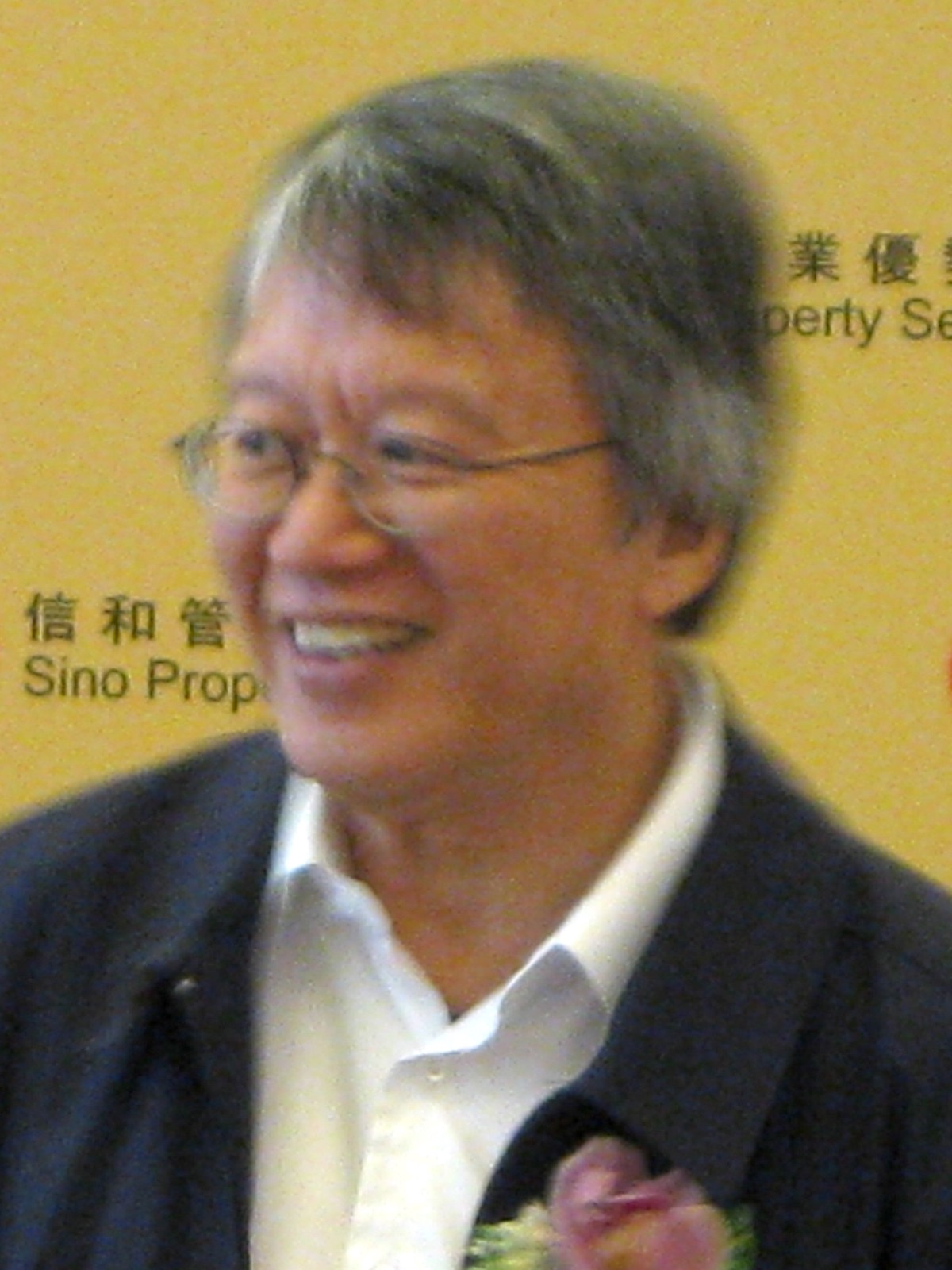
- Lau Chin-shek

Member of Legislative Council of Hong Kong
- In office 1 October 1991 – December 1994
- Succeeded by: Lee Cheuk-yan
- In office 1 October 1995 – 30 June 1997
- Preceded by: Lee Cheuk-yan
- Succeeded by: Replaced by Provisional Legislative Council
- In office 1 July 1998 – 30 September 2008
- Preceded by: New legislature
- Succeeded by: Raymond Wong Yuk-man

Personal details
- Born: September 12, 1944 (age 81) Guangzhou, Guangdong
- Party: Hong Kong Confederation of Trade Unions (1990–2004); Democratic Party (1994–2000); United Democrats of Hong Kong (1990–1994)

Lau Chin-shek
- Traditional Chinese: 劉千石
- Simplified Chinese: 刘千石
Transcriptions
Standard Mandarin
- Hanyu Pinyin: Liú Qiānshí
Yue: Cantonese
- Yale Romanization: Làuh Chīn sehk
- Jyutping: Lau^{4} Chin^{1} Sek^{6}

Lau Chin-shek (born 12 September 1944) was the President of the Hong Kong Confederation of Trade Unions and a member of the Legislative Council from 1991 to 2008.

== Background ==
Lau was born in Guangzhou, Guangdong with family root in Shunde, Guangdong. He smuggled from Guangzhou to Hong Kong in 1960. Since the 1980s, he has been a labour activist, working to help factory workers in Sham Shui Po and Cheung Sha Wan, where working conditions were poor.

During the Tiananmen Square protests of 1989, Lau and other pro-democracy activists expressed sympathy and support to the student demonstrators who had gathered at Tiananmen Square. He and others also founded the Hong Kong Alliance in Support of Patriotic Democratic Movements of China, which organises the anniversary commemoration of the 1989 protests.

In 1990, Lau and other labour activists, including Lee Cheuk-yan, established the 160,000-strong Hong Kong Confederation of Trade Unions. He was also vice-chairman of the Hong Kong Christian Industrial Committee.

Lau first ran in the Hong Kong legislative elections in 1991 and was elected. Being re-elected four times, Lau sat in the Legislative Council continuously from 1991 to 2008, except he resigned in 1994 but elected again in 1995, a brief period during 1997 and 1998 when the sovereignty of Hong Kong was transferred to the People's Republic of China, and the Legislative Council temporarily became a Provisional Legislative Council which was filled with people indirectly hand picked by Beijing.

In recent years, however, Lau has moderated his stance against Beijing. He was expelled from the Democratic Party in 2000 because of dual party membership. Once branded subversive by the central authorities, Lau had been barred from entering mainland China for more than a decade. In May 2000, after quiet lobbying by Hong Kong top leaders, he was allowed to make a low-key visit to Guangzhou to see his ailing mother. Since then, he has been urging his pro-democracy colleagues to have "better communication with the Central Government" and visit mainland China and see for themselves the changes that are taking place in the country.

Lau lost his seat in the Legislative Council in the Legislative Election of 2008 with only 5.1% or 10,553 votes.

Lau revealed to have been diagnosed with colorectal cancer on a radio program in September 2008, saying it is under control. He then turned low profile in politics, but endorsed pro-Beijing candidate Carrie Lam in 2017 Chief Executive election.

Legislative Council of Hong Kong
New constituency	Member of Legislative Council; Representative for Kowloon Central; 1991–1994; Served alongside: Lam Kui-shing	Succeeded by Lee Cheuk-yan
Preceded by Lee Cheuk-yan as Representative for Kowloon Central	Member of Legislative Council; Representative for Kowloon South; 1995–1997	Replaced by Provisional Legislative Council
New parliament	Member of Legislative Council; Representative for Kowloon West constituency 1998–2008; With: Jasper Tsang, James To (1998–2008); Frederick Fung (2000–2008)	Succeeded by Raymond Wong
Party political offices
Preceded by Anthony Cheung	Vice Chairperson of Democratic Party; 1998; Served alongside: Yeung Sum	Succeeded by Albert Ho
