= Lee Cheuk-yan =

Hong Kong politician (born 1957)

- 李卓人
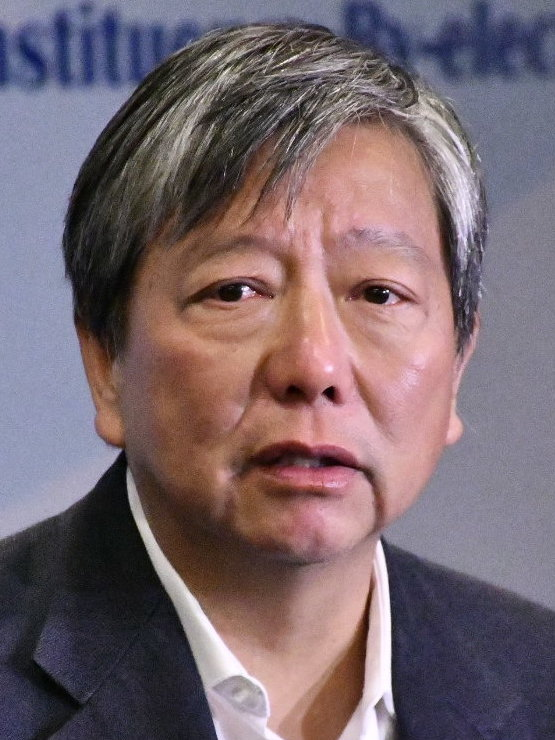
- Lee in 2018

Chairman of the Labour Party
- In office 18 December 2011 – 13 December 2015
- Succeeded by: Suzanne Wu

Chairman of the Hong Kong Alliance in Support of Patriotic Democratic Movements of China
- In office 2 January 2011 – 15 December 2014
- Deputy: Richard Tsoi; Mak Hoi-wah
- Preceded by: Szeto Wah
- Succeeded by: Albert Ho
- In office 8 December 2019 – 25 September 2021
- Deputy: Chow Hang-tung
- Preceded by: Albert Ho
- Succeeded by: Organization dissolved

General Secretary of the Hong Kong Confederation of Trade Unions
- In office 1990 – 3 October 2021

Member of the Legislative Council
- In office 1 July 1998 – 30 September 2016
- Preceded by: New parliament
- Succeeded by: Cheng Chung-tai
- Constituency: New Territories West
- In office 11 October 1995 – 30 June 1997
- Preceded by: New constituency
- Succeeded by: Replaced by Provisional Legislative Council
- Constituency: Manufacturing
- In office 10 February 1995 – 31 July 1995
- Preceded by: Lau Chin-shek
- Succeeded by: Lau Chin-shek
- Constituency: Kowloon Central

Personal details
- Born: 12 February 1957 (age 69) Shanghai, China
- Party: Hong Kong Confederation of Trade Unions; Labour Party
- Other political affiliations: Hong Kong Alliance in Support of Patriotic Democratic Movements of China
- Spouse: Elizabeth Tang
- Education: University of Hong Kong
- Occupation: Legislative Councillor; Trade unionist

Lee Cheuk-yan
- Chinese: 李卓人
Transcriptions
Standard Mandarin
- Hanyu Pinyin: Lǐ Zhuórén
Yue: Cantonese
- Yale Romanization: Léih Cheuk Yàhn
- Jyutping: Lei^{5} Coek^{3} Jan^{4}

Lee Cheuk-yan (Chinese: 李卓人; born 12 February 1957 in Shanghai) is a Hong Kong politician and social activist. He was a member of the Legislative Council of Hong Kong from 1995 to 2016, when he lost his seat. He represented the Kowloon West and the Manufacturing constituencies briefly in 1995 and had been representing the New Territories West constituency from 1998 to 2016. He is a former trade union leader, former General Secretary of the Hong Kong Confederation of Trade Unions, as well as former chairman of the Hong Kong Alliance in Support of Patriotic Democratic Movements of China. He has been jailed since April 2021 for his role in the Hong Kong anti-extradition bill protests, having been sentenced for organizing two unauthorized assemblies. In September 2026, he was sentenced for incitement to subversion to seven years in prison, alongside fellow activists Chow Hang-tung and Albert Ho. By that time he had already been in prison in relation to that case for about five years.

== Background ==
Lee's ancestral home is Chaoyang, Guangdong. Lee emigrated from Mainland China to Hong Kong in 1959. He graduated from the University of Hong Kong with a bachelor's degree in civil engineering in 1978. His labour activism began with his first job after graduation, when he came in contact with workers with occupational injuries and diseases.

During the student-led Tiananmen Square protests of 1989, he collected donations from the Concert for Democracy in China in Hong Kong and travelled to Beijing to hand over the funds to student protesters in Tiananmen Square. He was detained by the authorities there and made to sign a confession letter before being allowed to return to Hong Kong. Since the events of 1989, Lee has remained a standing committee member of the Hong Kong Alliance in Support of Patriotic Democratic Movements of China which promotes democratic reform in China.

== Legislative Councillor ==
In 1995, Lee was elected unopposed in a by-election of the Legislative Council, replacing Lau Chin-shek, who had resigned. He was re-elected four times, continuously serving as a lawmaker, except for a brief period during 1997 and 1998, when the sovereignty of Hong Kong was transferred to the People's Republic of China, and the Legislative Council temporarily became a Provisional Legislative Council, composed of Beijing nominees.

He received an unexpected loss in the 2016 Legislative Council election, departing the legislature after more than 20 years of service.

== Labour Party ==
In December 2011, he and three other Legislative Councillors Fernando Cheung, Cyd Ho and Cheung Kwok-che co-founded the Labour Party, which became the third largest pan-democratic party in the legislature. He served as chairman until December 2015 when he stepped down to give way to the younger party members and took the vice-chairmanship.

== Family ==
He is married to Elizabeth Tang, who in 2005 was the chairperson of the Hong Kong People's Alliance on WTO, and who as of March 2023 is the general secretary of the International Domestic Workers Federation. They have one daughter.

== Arrests and sentencings ==
On 28 February 2020, Lee was arrested for his involvement in a pro-democracy march on 31 August 2019, which was part of the protests sparked by the extradition bill and had been classified by police as illegal assembly. A few hours later, he was released on bail, as were the other arrestees Jimmy Lai and Yeung Sum. The cases were scheduled to be heard at Eastern Law Court on 5 May 2020.

On 18 April 2020, Lee was one of the 15 Hong Kong high-profile democracy figures arrested on suspicion of organizing, publicizing or taking part in several unauthorized assemblies between August and October 2019 during the anti-extradition bill protests. On 1 April 2021, Lee, along with six other pro-democracy advocates, was found guilty of organizing an unauthorised rally on 18 August 2019. On 16 April, Lee was sentenced to 14 months in jail for his role in this and another August 2019 rally.

On 11 September 2026, Lee was sentenced to seven years in prison over an incitement of subversion case for which he, alongside fellow activists Chow Hang-tung and Albert Ho. Chow and Ho were sentenced the same day, as was the Hong Kong Alliance in which the three had leading roles.

== See also ==
- List of graduates of University of Hong Kong
- List of Chinese pro-democracy activists

Legislative Council of Hong Kong
| Preceded by Lau Chin-shek | Member of Legislative Council; Representative for Kowloon Central; March 1995 – September 1995; Served alongside: Lam Kui-shing | Succeeded by Lau Chin-shek as Representative for Kowloon South |
| New seat | Member of Legislative Council; Representative for Manufacturing; 1995–1997 | Replaced by Provisional Legislative Council |
| New parliament | Member of Legislative Council; Representative for New Territories West; 1998–2016 | Succeeded by Cheng Chung-tai |
Party political offices
| New political party | Chairman of Labour Party; 2011–2015 | Succeeded by Suzanne Wu |
Non-profit organization positions
| Preceded by Szeto Wah | Chairman of Hong Kong Alliance in Support of Patriotic Democratic Movements of China; 2011–2014 | Succeeded by Albert Ho |
| Preceded by Albert Ho | Chairman of Hong Kong Alliance in Support of Patriotic Democratic Movements of China; 2019–2021 | Succeeded by Organization dissolved |
Order of precedence
| Preceded by Albert Ho; Member of the Legislative Council | Hong Kong order of precedence Member of the Legislative Council | Succeeded by James To; Member of the Legislative Council |
