= 2000 Hong Kong Election Committee Subsector elections =

2000 Election Committee subsector elections
- 9 July 2000

664 (of the 800) seats in the Election Committee 401 seats needed for a majority
- Registered: 179,024 ▲24.81%
- Turnout: 32,823 (19.49%) ▼3.89pp
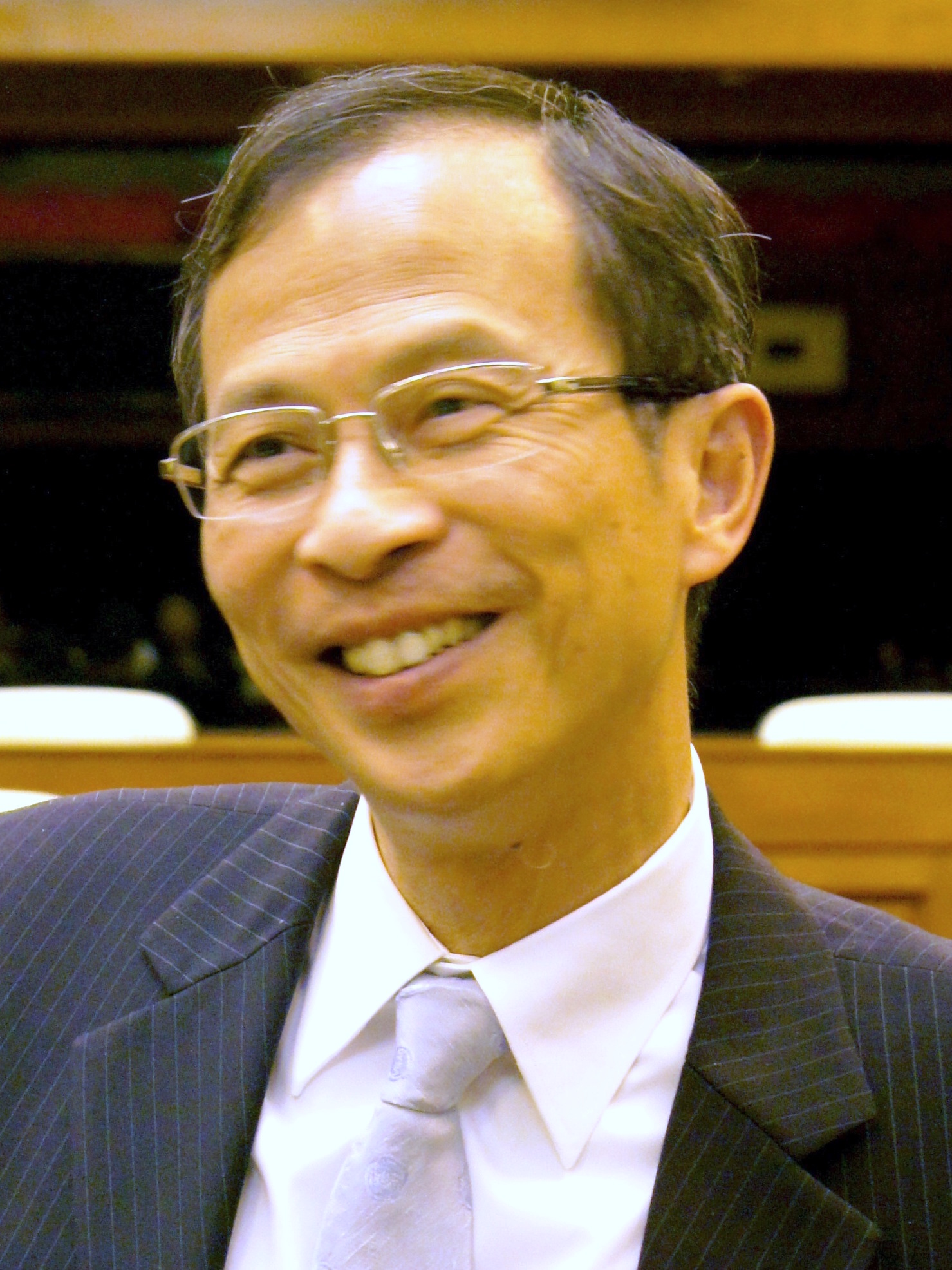

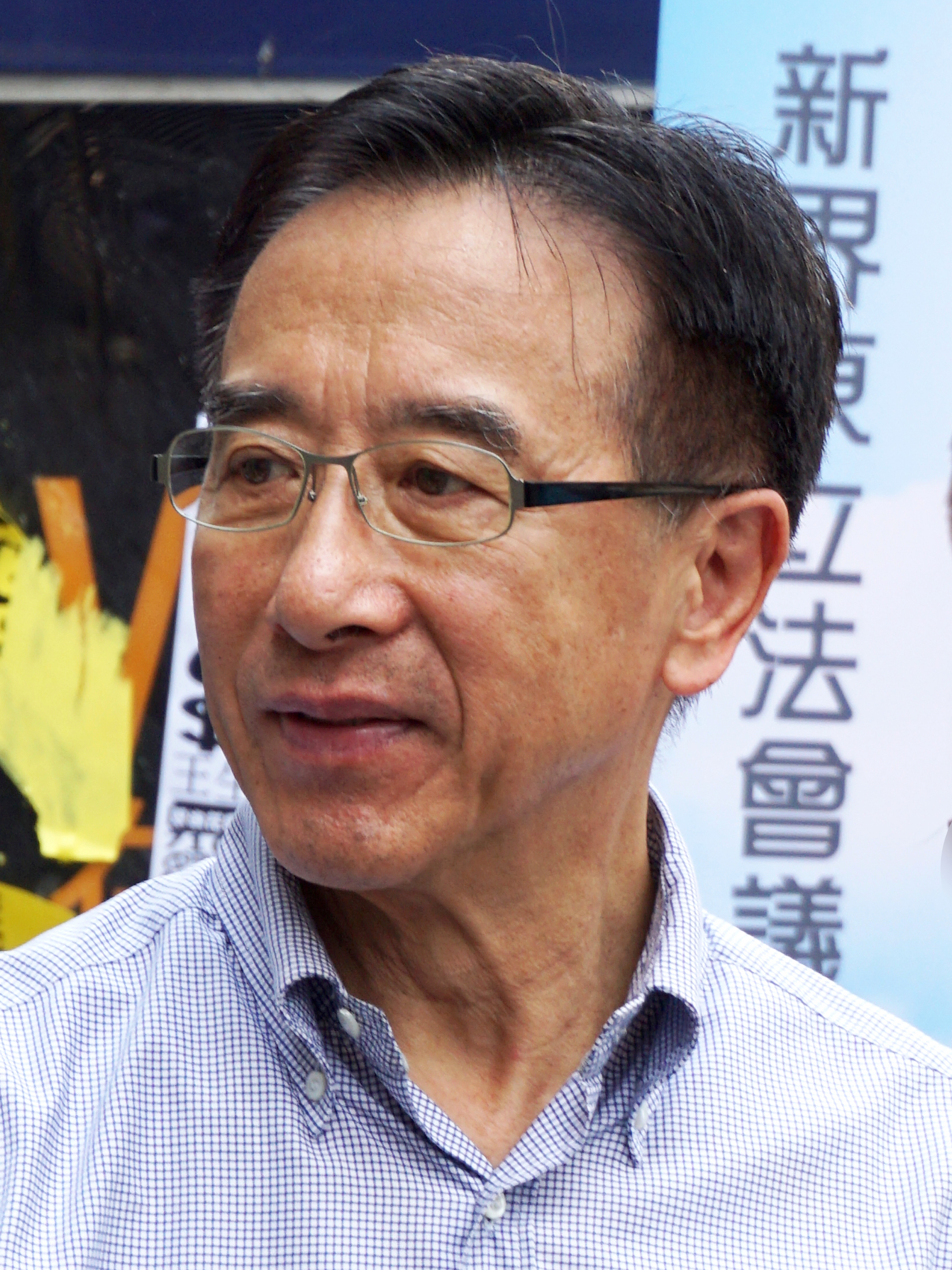

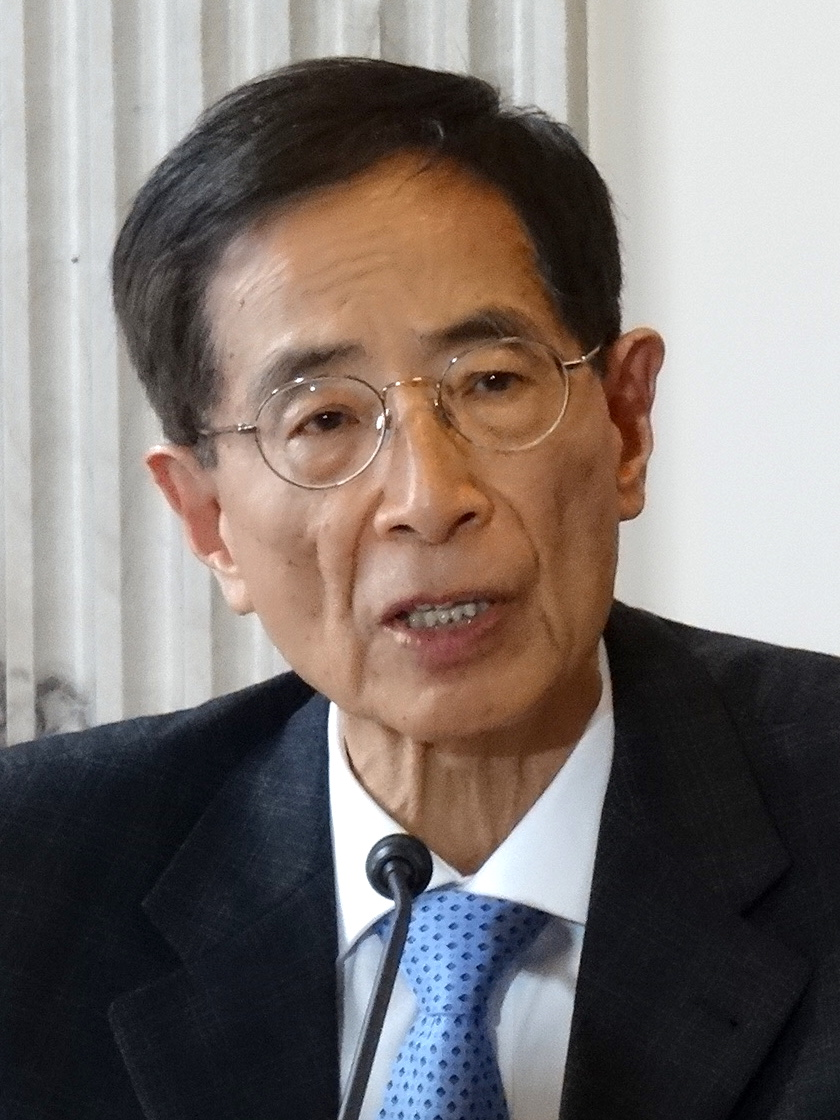
| | First party | Second party |
|---|---|---|
| | PA |
| Leader | Ambrose Lau | Tsang Yok-sing |
| Party | HKPA | DAB |
| Alliance | Pro-Beijing | Pro-Beijing |
| Seats won | 66 | 60 |
| | Third party | Fourth party |
| Leader | James Tien | Martin Lee |
| Party | Liberal | Democratic |
| Alliance | Pro-Beijing | Pro-democracy |
| Seats won | 28 | 22 |

The 2000 Election Committee subsector elections were held on 9 July 2000 to elect 664 members of Election Committee. The Election Committee was responsible for electing the Legislative Council members of the Election Committee constituency, as well as the Chief Executive of Hong Kong in the following 2002 Chief Executive election.

== Composition ==
The 800-member Election Committee had four sectors were sub-divided into 38 subsectors. The sectors, subsectors and the numbers of the Election Committee members to be returned by each subsector. The National People's Congress Subsector and the Legislative Council Subsector did not hold elections as the Hong Kong deputies to the National People's Congress and the Legislative Council members were ex-officio members of the Election Committee. The members from the Religious Subsector were returned by way of nomination.

The 38 Subsectors and the number of the members were:

First Sector:

1. Catering (11)
2. Commercial (first) (12)
3. Commercial (second) (12)
4. Employers’ Federation of Hong Kong (11)
5. Finance (12)
6. Financial services (12)
7. Hong Kong Chinese Enterprises Association (11)
8. Hotel (11)
9. Import and export (12)
10. Industrial (first) (12)
11. Industrial (second) (12)
12. Insurance (12)
13. Real estate and construction (12)
14. Textiles and garment (12)
15. Tourism (12)
16. Transport (12)
17. Wholesale and retail (12)

Second Sector:

1. Accountancy (20)
2. Architectural, surveying and planning (20)
3. Chinese medicine (20)
4. Education (20)
5. Engineering (20)
6. Health services (20)
7. Higher education (20)
8. Information technology (20)
9. Legal (20)
10. Medical (20)

Third Sector:

1. Agriculture and fisheries (40)
2. Labour (40)
3. Religious (40)
4. Social welfare (40)
5. Sports, performing arts, culture and publication (40)

Fourth Sector:

1. National People's Congress (“NPC”) (36)
2. Legislative Council (60)
3. Chinese People's Political Consultative Conference (“CPPCC”) (41)
4. Heung Yee Kuk (21)
5. Hong Kong and Kowloon District Councils (21)
6. New Territories District Councils (21)

== Nominations ==
During the nomination period from 31 May to 7 June 2000, all 35 subsectors received a total of 911 nominations of candidates. 182 validly nominated in nine subsectors and two sub-subsectors were returned uncontested; and 723 validly nominated were to contest in the remaining 25 subsectors and two sub-subsectors for 482 seats in the Election Committee.

== Results ==
Of the total electorate of 168,434 from the contested subsectors, only 32,823 turned up for the poll, a mere 19.49%. This was considerably lower than the 23.38% in respect of the 1998 subsector elections. The Election Committee thus formed comprised 90 ex-officio members, 40 members nominated from the Religious Subsector, 182 returned uncontested and 482 returned contested from the elections, making a total of 794 members. This falls short of the generally known figure of 800 by six because four members had dual capacities, i.e. they were both deputies to the National People's Congress and Legislative Council members, one Legislative Council member had resigned from the council before the term of office ended on 30 June 2000, and one deputy to the National People's Congress could not be an Election Committee member for not being a permanent resident of Hong Kong.

=== Results by subsector ===
Statistics are generated from the Report on the 2000 Legislative Council Elections.

| Sector | Subsector | Registered voters | Candidates | Elected | Votes | Turnout | |
|---|---|---|---|---|---|---|---|
| Sector | I | Catering | 6,965 | 19 | 11 | 827 | 11.88 |
| I | Commercial (First) | 1,263 | 17 | 12 | 349 | 30.91 | |
| I | Commercial (Second) | 1,793 | 12 | 12 | uncontested | | |
| I | Employers' Federation of Hong Kong | 137 | 11 | 11 | uncontested | | |
| I | Finance | 176 | 15 | 12 | 97 | 70.29 | |
| I | Financial Services | 548 | 18 | 12 | 294 | 65.33 | |
| I | Hong Kong Chinese Enterprises Association | 345 | 11 | 11 | uncontested | | |
| I | Hotel | 92 | 11 | 11 | 77 | uncontested | |
| I | Import and Export | 1,408 | 12 | 12 | uncontested | | |
| I | Industrial (First) | 814 | 22 | 12 | 412 | 56.05 | |
| I | Industrial (Second) | 616 | 12 | 12 | uncontested | | |
| I | Insurance | 177 | 15 | 12 | 131 | 76.16 | |
| I | Real Estate and Construction | 677 | 13 | 12 | 412 | 63.58 | |
| I | Textiles and Garment | 4,693 | 12 | 12 | uncontested | | |
| I | Tourism | 806 | 17 | 12 | 353 | 50.00 | |
| I | Transport | 146 | 15 | 12 | 103 | 70.55 | |
| I | Wholesale and Retail | 3,363 | 16 | 12 | 945 | 28.66 | |
| I | Sub-total for First Sector | 24,019 | 248 | 200 | 4,000 | 22.47 | |
| II | Accountancy | 12,782 | 40 | 20 | 1,978 | 15.47 | |
| II | Architectural, Surveying and Planning | 3,829 | 28 | 20 | 907 | 23.69 | |
| II | Chinese Medicine | 2,885 | 47 | 20 | 1,180 | 40.90 | |
| II | Education | 66,562 | 38 | 20 | 11,943 | 17.94 | |
| II | Engineering | 6,034 | 39 | 20 | 1,915 | 31.74 | |
| II | Health Services | 31,655 | 30 | 20 | 3,085 | 9.75 | |
| II | Higher Education | 4,796 | 33 | 20 | 977 | 20.37 | |
| II | Information Technology | 3,859 | 22 | 20 | 845 | 21.95 | |
| II | Legal | 4,177 | 35 | 20 | 1,234 | 29.54 | |
| II | Medical | 7,723 | 47 | 20 | 2,097 | 27.15 | |
| II | Sub-total for Second Sector | 144,302 | 359 | 200 | 26,161 | 18.13 | |
| III | Agriculture and Fisheries | 167 | 40 | 40 | uncontested | | |
| III | Labour | 455 | 49 | 40 | 289 | 69.30 | |
| III | Religious | N/A | 40 | 40 | no election | | |
| III | Social Welfare | 8,105 | 48 | 40 | 1,734 | 21.44 | |
| III | Sports, Performing Arts, Culture and Publication (Performing Arts) | 212 | 13 | 10 | 93 | 43.87 | |
| III | Sports, Performing Arts, Culture and Publication (Culture) | 473 | 13 | 10 | 211 | 44.61 | |
| III | Sports, Performing Arts, Culture and Publication (Others) | 591 | 20 | 20 | uncontested | | |
| III | Sub-total for Third Sector | 10,003 | 223 | 200 | 2,327 | 19.00 | |
| IV | National People's Congress | N/A | 36 | 36 | ex officio | | |
| IV | Legislative Council | N/A | 60 | 60 | ex officio | | |
| IV | Chinese People's Political Consultative Conference | 128 | 41 | 41 | uncontested | | |
| IV | Heung Yee Kuk | 143 | 23 | 21 | 105 | 73.43 | |
| IV | Hong Kong and Kowloon District Councils | 223 | 25 | 21 | 164 | 73.54 | |
| IV | New Territories District Councils | 206 | 23 | 21 | 143 | 69.42 | |
| IV | Sub-total for Fourth Sector | 700 | 208 | 200 | 412 | 72.03 | |
| | TOTAL | 179,024 | 1,038 | 800 | 32,823 | 19.49 | |

=== Results by political party ===
| Affiliation | Elected |
|---|---|
| Hong Kong Progressive Alliance | 66 |
| Democratic Alliance for the Betterment of Hong Kong | 60 |
| Liberal Party | 28 |
| Democratic Party | 22 |
| The Frontier | 5 |
| New Century Forum | 3 |
| Civil Force | 2 |
| Citizens Party | 1 |
| Hong Kong Association for Democracy and People's Livelihood | 1 |
