= 2005 Hong Kong Chief Executive election =

- 16 June 2005

All 800 votes of the Election Committee 401 votes needed to win
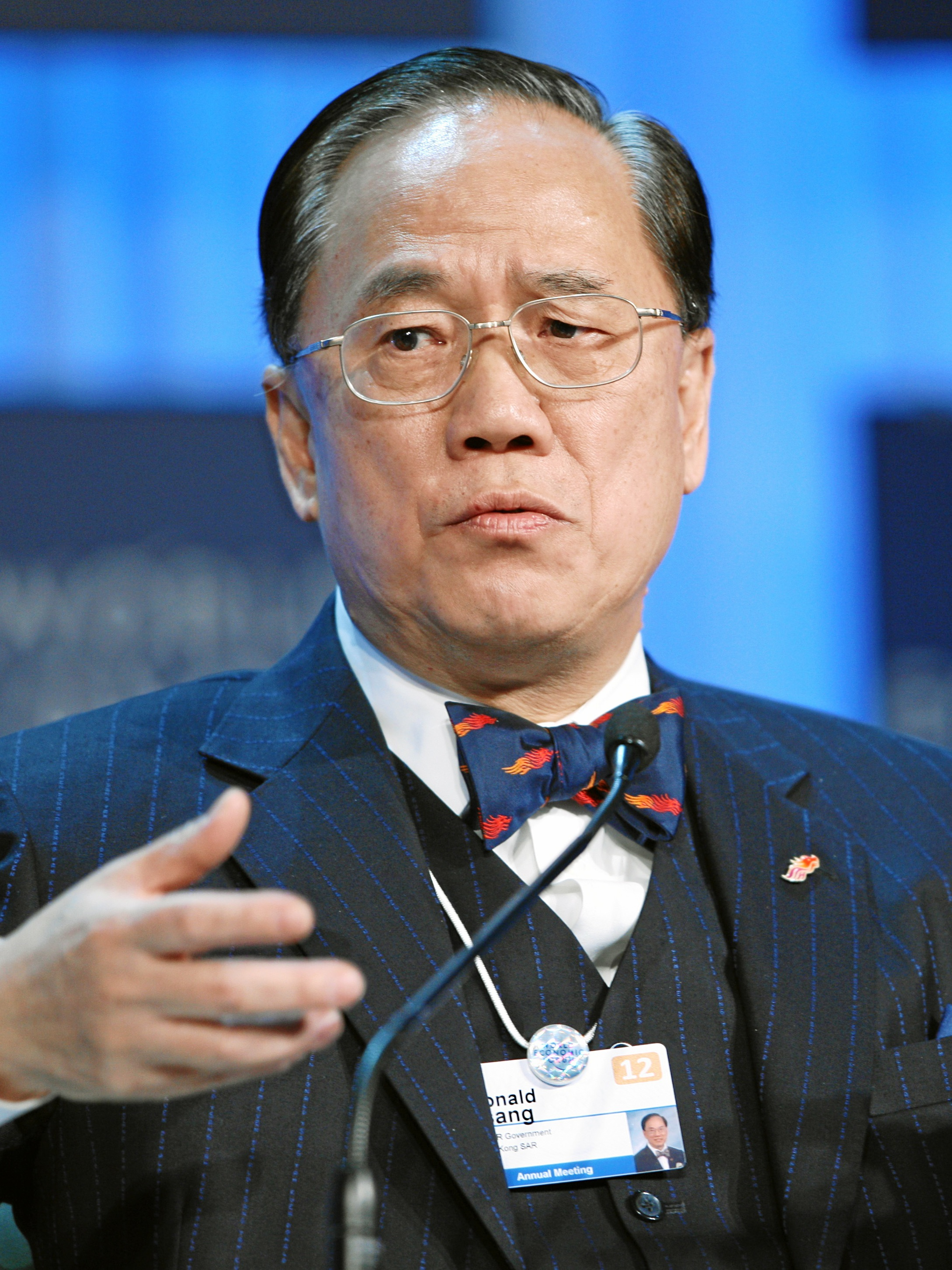
Nominee	Donald Tsang
Party	Nonpartisan
Alliance	Pro-Beijing
Electoral vote	Uncontested
Chief Executive before election
Henry Tang (acting)
Nonpartisan
Elected Chief Executive
Donald Tsang
Nonpartisan

The 2005 Hong Kong Chief Executive election was held to fill the vacancy of the territory's top office. Then Chief Executive Tung Chee-hwa submitted his resignation to the central government in Beijing, and was officially approved on 12 March. As Donald Tsang, Chief Secretary for Administration in Tung's cabinet, was the only candidate, he was declared elected unopposed on 16 June. Tsang took office on 21 June to begin his first two-year term.

== Background ==
During the 1996 and 2002 elections, an 800-member Election Committee was used to elect the Chief Executive. There is no universal suffrage or universal right to vote in Hong Kong. Senior employees, managers and professionals mainly vote pro-China to ensure their businesses can run smoothly. They were entirely biased in favour of Beijing's stance in the previous two elections.

The previously elected Tung Chee-hwa had long been an unpopular Chief executive. Tung claimed his health was deteriorating early in 2005 and announced he was ready to resign. He filed for resignation on 10 March, and two days later it was approved. An election was scheduled on 10 July to select the new Chief Executive. In the interim, Tsang and later Henry Tang served as acting Chief Executives in accordance with the Basic Law.

There were debates over the term of office for Tung's successor: whether the new Chief Executive should serve Tung's remaining two-year term or a full five-year term. The government tabled Chief Executive Election (Amendment) (Term of Office of the Chief Executive) Bill. Since the election and the term of the Chief Executive are regulated by the Basic Law, to settle the disputes, the Acting Chief Secretary filed a request for interpretation of the Basic Law to the PRC National People's Congress Standing Committee (NPCSC), amidst some oppositions to the request. On 27 April, the NPCSC interpreted Article 53 that

[...] prior to the year 2007 when the Chief Executive is selected by the Election Committee with a five-year term of office, in the event that the office of the Chief Executive becomes vacant as he (she) fails to serve the full term of office of five years as prescribed by Article 46 of the Basic Law, the term of office of the new Chief Executive shall be the remainder of the previous Chief Executive; and that after 2007, the above-mentioned method for selecting the Chief Executives could be amended, and should the office of the Chief Executive then become vacant, the term of office of the new Chief Executive shall be determined in accordance with the amended method for the selection of the Chief Executive.

== Relevant text of the Basic Law ==
=== Article 52 ===
Article 52 item 1 cites a health illness as an acceptable reason for resignation:

"The Chief Executive of the Hong Kong Special Administrative Region must resign under any of the following circumstances:
(1) When he or she loses the ability to discharge his or her duties as a result of serious illness or other reasons."

Given the status of this resignation as voluntary (as Tung claims), and there are allegations that the citing of health reasons may not be an actual truth, as there is technically nothing prohibiting the use of excuses in such a manner. It is rumoured that the actual motive is a decision imposed by the central government, but it can also be a desire to spend more time with the family or many other reasons.

=== Article 53 ===
Article 53 gives the provisions for an acting Chief Executive.

"If the Chief Executive of the Hong Kong Special Administrative Region is not able to discharge his or her duties for a short period, such duties shall temporarily be assumed by the Administrative Secretary, Financial Secretary or Secretary of Justice in this order of precedence."

This gave Donald Tsang, the Secretary of Administration at the time, the right to act as Chief Executive from 12 March to 25 May. He then had to resign, since it was illegal for him to become a candidate while acting as Chief Executive at the same time. Henry Tang, who was then Financial Secretary, filled him in according to the article. He then appointed Michael Suen as the new (acting in the interim) Chief Secretary. When Tsang was elected he was brought before the central government for approval and inauguration. The second section of Article 53 gives provisions for a new election.

"In the event that the office of Chief Executive becomes vacant, a new Chief Executive shall be selected within six months in accordance with the provisions of Article 45 of this Law. During the period of vacancy, his or her duties shall be assumed according to the provisions of the preceding paragraph."

The process is well defined under this clause, and Tsang's term as acting Chief Executive was limited to six months. The Chief Executive Election Ordinance defines the time as 120 days, give or take a few days, (ensuring an election on Sunday rather than on a weekday), which made 10 July the date for the election, if one had been warranted by multiple candidature.

== Election Committee by-elections ==
In April 2005, 33 vacancies (27 from the regular constituencies, 6 from the religious sector) existed in the Election Committee. Nominations were accepted over a one-week timeframe from 9 to 15 April to fill the seats. The six empty seats in the religious sector were appointed by the religious councils. Out of the 27 seats in 16 subsectors, 12 candidates were immediately declared elected to their seats because there were no more candidates competing than the number of seats available, and hence, these ones were declared elected unopposed.

In the other seven constituencies, where 15 vacancies were present, a poll was held on 1 May, and the count was conducted smoothly with all the elected candidates expected to be entered onto the official listing of Election Committee members within the near future. The by-election was marked by voter apathy, where only 15% of the eligible population turned up, with some constituencies reporting as low as 12%, despite the pleadings of the Hong Kong Government. Only two subsectors, Agriculture and Fisheries (85%) and District Council (86%) had higher voter turnouts than one quarter.

== Candidates ==
From 3 to 16 June nominations were open to candidates who wanted to participate in this election. The support of 100 Election Committee members is required (Ann. 1, Sect. 4, above) for nominations to be valid. Given the largely pro-China status of the Election Committee, it became common for the favoured candidate of the Chinese government to get elected unopposed. Given there were four vacancies in the EC, 697 signatures would theoretically be necessary to secure unopposed election.

=== Nominee ===
Candidate	Born	Party	Most recent position	Campaign	Nominations received
Donald Tsang 曾蔭權	7 October 1944 (age 60)	Nonpartisan (Pro-Beijing)	Chief Secretary for Administration (2001–2005)	Announced: 2 June 2005; Nominated: 15 June 2005	674 / 800 (84%)

=== Withdrawn ===
Candidate	Born	Party	Most recent position	Campaign	Nominations received
Lee Wing-tat 李永達	25 December 1955 (age 49)	Democratic Party (Pan-democracy)	Member of the Legislative Council and Democratic Party Chairman (2000–2012; 2004–2006)	Announced: 17 April 2005; Withdrew: 15 June 2005	52 / 800 (7%)
Chim Pui-chung 詹培忠	24 September 1946 (age 58)	Nonpartisan (Pro-Beijing)	Member of the Legislative Council (2004–2012)	Announced: 17 May 2005; Withdrew: 16 June 2005	21 / 800 (3%)

Other minor invalid candidates included Chan Yuet-tung, Li Hau, Allen Tam Kwan-sui, Vincent Yang Yuen-shan, Yun Shat-man.

=== Expressed interest but did not run ===
- Emily Lau Wai-hing, convenor of The Frontier and member of the Legislative Council
- James Tien Pei-chun, chairman of the Liberal Party and member of the Legislative Council
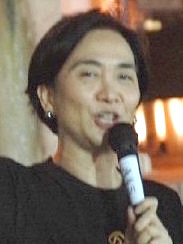
The Frontier convenor
Emily Lau

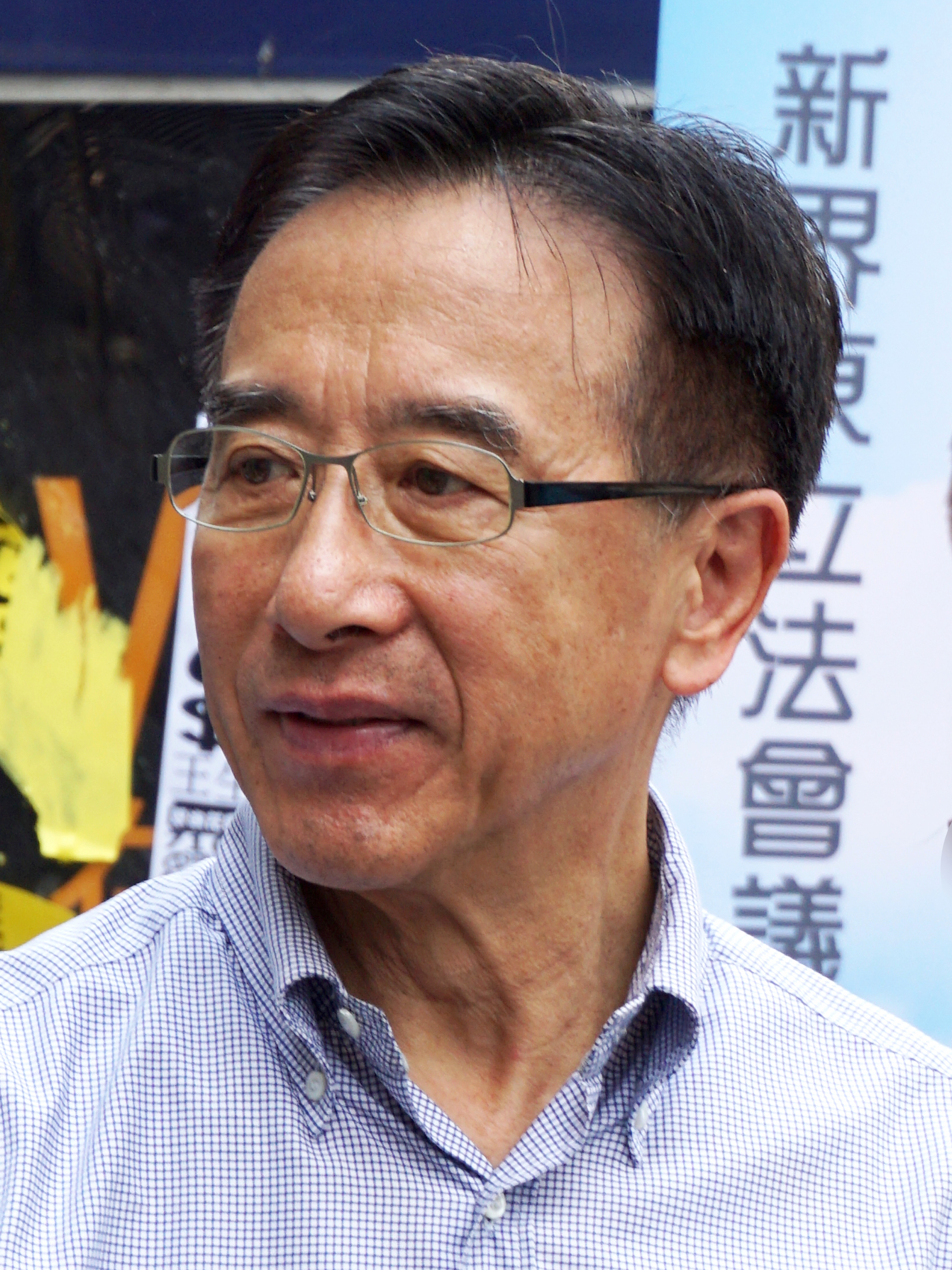
Liberal Party chairman
James Tien

== Nominations ==
Tsang instantly became the frontrunner in the race to succeed Tung. According to Tsang's election website, he engaged in "closed door meetings" with individual EC members. Tsang was criticised for refusing to publicly debate with the other two competitors, and was accused of stifling debate, of obstructing a free discussion within the community about his position on the issues of the day.

Beijing was accused of pressuring, and intimidating EC members to support Tsang; some EC members reportedly left Hong Kong to avoid the pressure. The Standard cited high-level sources saying that Beijing hoped Tsang would forestall any possibility of being challenged for the office by securing at least 500 to 700 nominating votes. Sources close to Tsang confirmed Beijing was worried that a contested election could lead to political uncertainty, and wanted to be sure that "no one runs against their man".

On 15 June, Tsang handed in his nomination form which bore the signatures of 674 members of Election Committee. Later in the evening, the Returning Officer, Madam Justice Carlye Chu Fun Ling vetted the nomination form and determined that his nomination as a candidate in the election was valid. The other candidates failed, having garnered fewer than the required 100 backers, Tsang was declared the only valid candidate in the election. Tsang was declared elected unopposed on 16 June, gazetted by the Government on 21 June, and duly inaugurated on 24 June.

== Campaign finances ==
During the election campaign, Donald Tsang received about HK$27.33 million sponsorship for the campaign, about 20% of which came from the businessmen from the property sector. Although Tsang stated publicly that each sponsor could not sponsor in excess of one hundred-thousand Hong Kong dollars, some of the businessmen sponsored him in different names, for example, Stanley Ho and Lee Shau Kee each sponsored HK$1 million under their family members' names. In the end Tsang used only HK$4.12 million of the sponsorship. The remaining HK$23.21 million would be donated to 14 charitable organisations.
