= 2002 Hong Kong Election Committee Subsector by-elections =

The 2002 Election Committee subsector by-elections were held on 6 January 2002 to update the membership of the Election Committee for electing the Chief Executive of Hong Kong in the following Chief Executive election in March.

== Vacancies ==
Four vacancies were identified in the following subsectors:

1. Architectural, Surveying and Planning Subsector, as Kaizer Lau Ping-cheung, being a Legislative Council member, was deemed to have resigned from the Election Committee on 21 September 2001;
2. Finance Subsector, as Antony Leung Kam-chung resigned from the EC on 28 March 2001 on his appointment as the Financial Secretary of Hong Kong;
3. Heung Yee Kuk Subsector, as Tsang Ngan-hoi had died on 25 August 2001; and
4. Legal Subsector, as Audrey Eu Yuet-mee, being a Legislative Council member, was deemed to have resigned from the Election Committee on 21 September 2001.

== Results ==
=== General outcome ===
Statistics are generated from the Report on the 2002 Chief Executive Election.

Sector	Subsector	Registered voters	Candidates	Elected	Votes	Turnout	
Sector	I	Finance	123	15	1	30	24.39
II	Architectural, Surveying and Planning	3,908	1	1	uncontested		
II	Legal	4,033	35	1	649	16.09	
IV	Heung Yee Kuk	138	23	21	121	87.68	
TOTAL (for 3 contested subsectors)		4,294	4	3	800	18.63	

=== Finance ===
2002 Election Committee Subsector By-elections: Finance
Party	Candidate	Votes	%	±%
Nonpartisan	Yuen Wai-keung	23	76.7	
Nonpartisan	Shao You-bao	7	23.3	
Nonpartisan gain from Nonpartisan		Swing		

=== Architectural, Surveying and Planning ===
2002 Election Committee Subsector By-elections: Architectural, Surveying and Planning
Party	Candidate	Votes	%	±%
Liberal	Edward Ho Sing-tin	uncontested		
Liberal gain from Nonpartisan		Swing		

=== Legal ===
2002 Election Committee Subsector By-elections: Legal
Party	Candidate	Votes	%	±%
Nonpartisan	Ronny Tong Ka-wah	415	63.9	
Nonpartisan	Anthony Chow Wing-kin	231	35.6	
Nonpartisan gain from Nonpartisan		Swing		

=== Heung Yee Kuk ===
2002 Election Committee Subsector By-elections: Heung Yee Kuk
Party	Candidate	Votes	%	±%
Nonpartisan	Lam Wai-keung	94	77.7	
Nonpartisan	Tang Kam-leung	24	19.8	
Nonpartisan gain from Nonpartisan		Swing		

== See also ==
- 2002 Hong Kong Chief Executive election
