= 2005 Hong Kong Election Committee Subsector by-elections =

2005 Election Committee subsector by-elections
- 1 May 2005

33 (of the 800) seats in the Election Committee
- Turnout: 14.95%
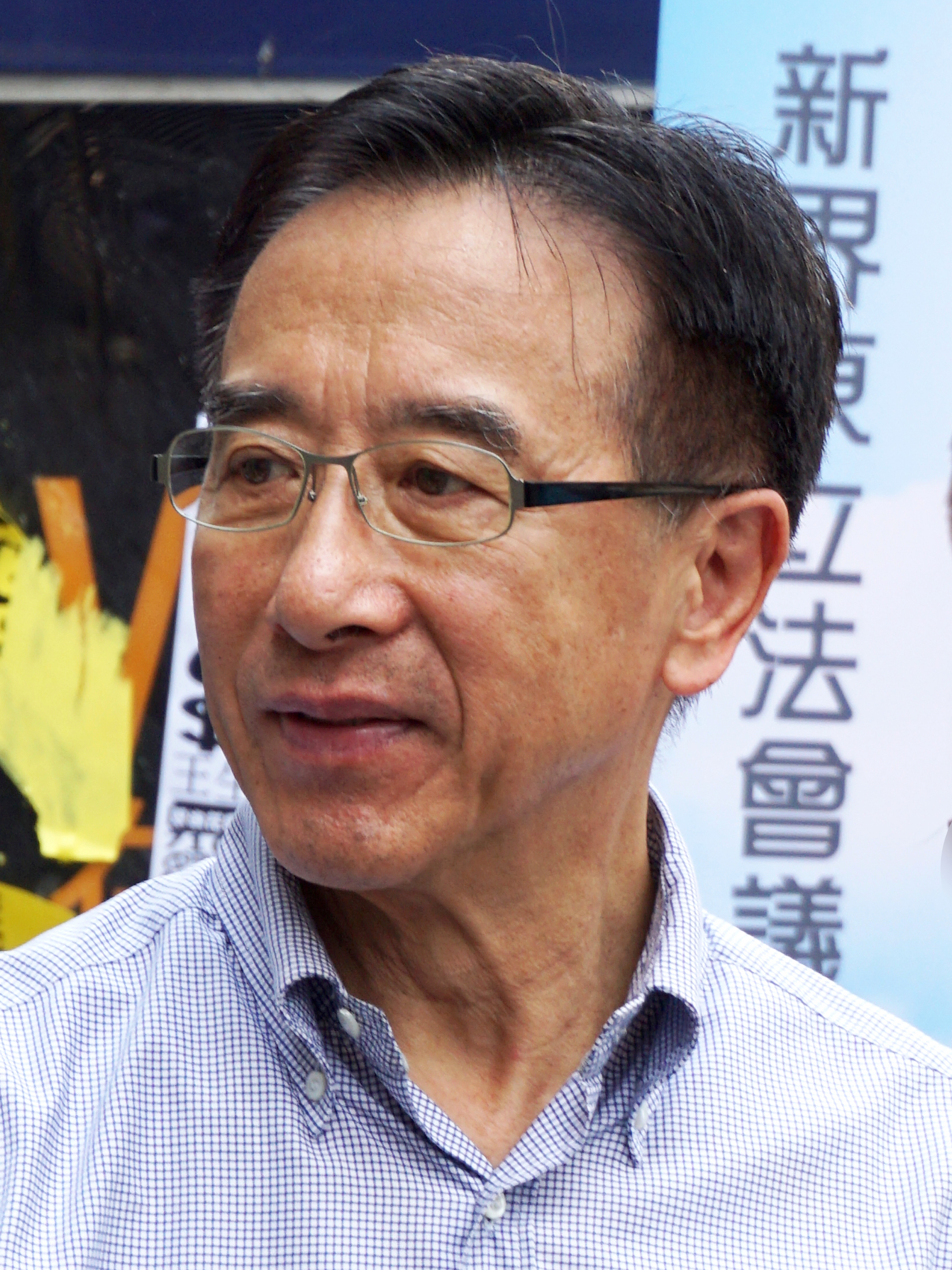

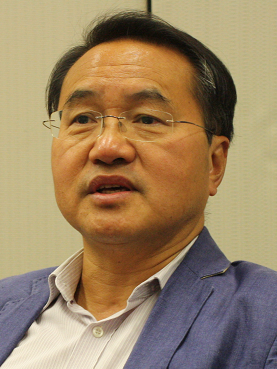
	First party	Second party	Third party
	DAB
Leader	Ma Lik	James Tien	Lee Wing-tat
Party	DAB	Liberal	Democratic
Alliance	Pro-Beijing	Pro-Beijing	Pan-democracy
Seats after	124	30	19
Seat change	▲1	Steady	▲1

The 2005 Election Committee subsector by-elections were held on 1 May 2005 to fill the 33 vacancies in 17 subsectors of the Election Committee for electing the Hong Kong Chief Executive in the Chief Executive election in following March.

== Background ==
Tung Chee Hwa had long been an unpopular Chief Executive, especially after the controversies over the Article 23 of the Hong Kong Basic Law which caused more than 500,000 people to march on 1 July 2003. Tung claimed his health was deteriorating early in 2005 and suddenly resigned on 10 March 2005 which triggered the election of the Chief Executive. The Election Committee by-elections were held to update the membership of the Election Committee, filling in the vacancies in the Election Committee. The pro-democracy camp, with Democratic Party's chairman Lee Wing-tat as the Chief Executive candidate, attempted to get over 100 nominations from the Election Committee to enter the race to prevent Donald Tsang being elected uncontested.

== Vacancies ==
There were 33 vacancies in 17 subsectors in which 27 were from the regular subsectors and 6 from the Religious Subsector. Out of these 33 vacancies, 19 of them arose from members being dead, two from members having resigned from the Election Committee and 12 from members being deemed to have resigned from the Election Committee. Reasons for the 33 vacancies ascertained in 17 subsectors are as follows:

1. Accountancy Subsector: two vacancies arose because two members, namely, Fan Sheung-tak and Fok Kwan-wing had died;
2. Agriculture and Fisheries Subsector: two vacancies arose because two members, namely, Chan Chi-kong and Cheng For-yau had died;
3. Architectural, Surveying and Planning Subsector: one vacancy arose because a member, Patrick Lau Sau-shing having been elected as a legislative council member, was deemed to have resigned from the Election Committee on 8 October 2004;
4. Chinese People’s Political Consultative Conference Subsector: two vacancies arose because one member, Wong Ker-lee had died and another member, Lee Hon-chiu had resigned from the Election Committee;
5. Chinese Medicine Subsector: one vacancy arose because a member, namely, Poon Pak-sun had died;
6. Engineering Subsector: two vacancies arose because two members, namely, Kenneth Chan Nai-keong and Yim Chun-nam had died;
7. Finance Subsector: one vacancy arose because Lam Kwong-siu, having been elected as a National People’s Congress member, was deemed to have resigned from the Election Committee on 21 March 2003;
8. Heung Yee Kuk Subsector: four vacancies arose because two members, namely, Pang Hang-yin and Ho Sun-kuen had died; and two other members, namely, Cheung Hok-ming and Lam Wai-keung, having been elected as Legislative Council members, were deemed to have resigned from the Election Committee on 8 October 2004;
9. Higher Education Subsector: one vacancy arose because a member, Leung Jin-pang had died;
10. Hong Kong and Kowloon District Councils Subsector: three vacancies arose because a member, Liang Tin had died; another two members, namely, Ko Po-ling, having been elected as a National People's Congress member, and Wong Kwok-hing, having been elected as a Legislative Council member, were deemed to have resigned from the EC on 21 March 2003 and 8 October 2004 respectively;
11. Import and Export Subsector: one vacancy arose because a member, Wong Ting-kwong, having been elected as a Legislative Council member, was deemed to have resigned from the EC on 8 October 2004;
12. Industrial (First) Subsector: two vacancies arose because two members, namely, Jeffrey Lam Kin-fung, and Andrew Leung Kwan-yuen, both having been elected as Legislative Council members, were deemed to have resigned from the Election Committee on 8 October 2004;
13. Industrial (Second) Subsector: one vacancy arose because a member, Lam Hok-po had died;
14. Labour Subsector: one vacancy arose because a member, Wong Kwok-kin, having been elected as a National People's Congress member, was deemed to have resigned from the Election Committee on 21 March 2003;
15. Legal Subsector: two vacancies arose because two members, namely, Alan Leong Kah-kit and Ronny Tong Ka-wah, both having been elected as LegCo members, were deemed to have resigned from the Election Committee on 8 October 2004;
16. Religious Subsector: six vacancies arose because five members, namely, Tong Kwok-wah, Chiu Chung-tong, David Chu Chor-sing, Ku Sze-chung and Yau Fu-hong had died; and a member, Rubbya Hassan had resigned from the Election Committee; and
17. Textiles and Garment Subsector: one vacancy arose because a member, Lee Chung-chiu had died.

== Nominations ==
The six empty seats in the religious sector were nominated by the religious councils. Harry Ha Kay-wai from the Chinese Muslim Cultural and Fraternal Association, Thomas Soo Yee-po from the Hong Kong Christian Council, Tong Wai-ki, Cheung Kam-hung and Lo Wai-kon from the Hong Kong Taoist Association, and Wu Tai-chow from the Confucian Academy duly nominated as the members of the Election Committee Religious Subsector.

The nominations for the other 25 seats from the regular subsectors were accepted over a one-week timeframe from 9 April to 15 April. 12 candidates in 7 subsectors were elected uncontested.

== Results ==
=== Contested elections ===
2005 Election Committee Subsector By-elections: Accountancy
Party	Candidate	Votes	%	±%
Nonpartisan	Eric Li Ka-cheung	958	45.1	
Nonpartisan	Kenneth Leung Kai-cheong	546	25.7	
Nonpartisan	Judy Lam Sin-lai	491	23.1	
Nonpartisan	Eric Ng Kwok-wai	303	14.3	
Liberal	Alexander Au Siu-kee	294	13.8	
Nonpartisan	Dora Lo Lai-yee	271	12.8	
Nonpartisan	Louis Leung Wing-on	195	9.2	
Nonpartisan	Susanna Chiu Kai-kuen	175	8.2	
Nonpartisan	Wilson Fung Ying-wai	139	6.5	
Nonpartisan	Choi Sau-yuk	110	5.2	
Nonpartisan	Rhoda Liu Mei-ling	89	4.2	
Nonpartisan	Peter Choy Chak-wa	65	3.1	
Nonpartisan gain from Nonpartisan		Swing		
Nonpartisan gain from Nonpartisan		Swing		

2005 Election Committee Subsector By-elections: Agriculture and Fisheries
Party	Candidate	Votes	%	±%
Nonpartisan	Cheung Chee-chuen	103	75.2	
Nonpartisan	Wong Yuen-tai	92	67.2	
Nonpartisan	Tang Nuen-fun	32	23.4	
Liberal	Chan Kin-yip	29	21.2	
Nonpartisan gain from Nonpartisan		Swing		
Nonpartisan gain from Nonpartisan		Swing		

2005 Election Committee Subsector By-elections: Architectural, Surveying and Planning
Party	Candidate	Votes	%	±%
Nonpartisan	Cheung Tat-tong	424	52.5	
Democratic	Stanley Ng Wing-fai	280	34.7	
Nonpartisan	Philip Liao Yi-kang	97	12.0	
Nonpartisan gain from Nonpartisan		Swing		

2005 Election Committee Subsector By-elections: Chinese Medicine
Party	Candidate	Votes	%	±%
Nonpartisan	Feng Jiu	284	64.8	
Liberal	Tsang Chiu-hing	141	32.2	
Nonpartisan gain from Nonpartisan		Swing		

2005 Election Committee Subsector By-elections: Engineering
Party	Candidate	Votes	%	±%
Nonpartisan	Yim Kin-ping	441	43.2	
Nonpartisan	Lee Ping-kuen	413	40.5	
Liberal	James Lau Chi-wang	387	37.9	
Nonpartisan	Lam Kin-chung	333	32.6	
Nonpartisan gain from Nonpartisan		Swing		
Nonpartisan gain from Nonpartisan		Swing		

2005 Election Committee Subsector By-elections: Higher Education
Party	Candidate	Votes	%	±%
Democratic	Chan King-ming	559	68.3	
Nonpartisan	Ip Pui-to	254	31.1	
Democratic gain from Nonpartisan		Swing		

2005 Election Committee Subsector By-elections: Hong Kong and Kowloon District Councils
Party	Candidate	Votes	%	±%
Nonpartisan	Wong Kwok-keung	128	65.0	
Nonpartisan	Bunny Chan Chung-bun	128	61.9	
Nonpartisan	Tsang Heung-kwan	116	58.9	
Democratic	Chan Ka-wai	63	32.0	
Democratic	Joseph Lai Chi-keong	54	27.4	
ADPL	Tam Kwok-kiu	43	21.8	
Liberal	Chiang Sai-cheong	30	15.2	
Nonpartisan gain from Nonpartisan		Swing		
Nonpartisan gain from Nonpartisan		Swing		
Nonpartisan gain from DAB		Swing		

2005 Election Committee Subsector By-elections: Legal
Party	Candidate	Votes	%	±%
Nonpartisan	Eric Cheung Tat-ming	726	68.8	
Nonpartisan	Paul Shieh Wing-tai	669	63.4	
Nonpartisan	Moses Cheng Mo-chi	319	30.2	
Nonpartisan	Francis Chong Wing-charn	154	14.6	
Nonpartisan gain from Nonpartisan		Swing		
Nonpartisan gain from Nonpartisan		Swing		

2005 Election Committee Subsector By-elections: Textiles and Garment
Party	Candidate	Votes	%	±%
Nonpartisan	Lam Tai-fai	353	71.3	
Nonpartisan	Chung Kwok-pan	135	27.3	
Nonpartisan gain from Nonpartisan		Swing		

=== Uncontested elections ===
Candidate name	Affiliation
Chinese People's Political Consultative Conference
Wong Kong-hon	Nonpartisan
Walter Kwok Ping-sheung	Nonpartisan
Finance
Lo Chung-hing	People's Party
Heung Yee Kuk
Kingsley Sit Ho-yin	Nonpartisan
Tang Kam-leung	Nonpartisan
Mok Kam-kwai	Nonpartisan
Cheung Fo-tai	Nonpartisan
Import and Export
Chan Fung-ping	DAB
Industrial (First)
Kenneth Ting Woo-shou	Liberal Party
Chan Chun-tung	Liberal Party
Industrial (Second)
Chan Wing-kee	Nonpartisan
Labour
Yu Kam-keung	Nonpartisan

== See also ==
- 2005 Hong Kong Chief Executive election
