= Election Committee =

Hong Kong electoral college

Election Committee 選舉委員會
- 6th Election Committee
- Seats: 1,500

Elections
- Voting system: Multiple non-transferable vote
- First election: 2 April 1998
- Last election: 7 September 2025

Election Committee
- Traditional Chinese: 選舉委員會
- Simplified Chinese: 选举委员会
- Cantonese Yale: Syúngéui Wáiyùhnwuih
Transcriptions
Standard Mandarin
- Hanyu Pinyin: Xuǎnjǔ Wěiyuánhuì
Yue: Cantonese
- Yale Romanization: Syúngéui Wáiyùhnwuih
- Jyutping: Syun2geoi2 Wai2jyun4wui6

The Election Committee is the electoral college in Hong Kong that selects the Chief Executive (CE) and, since 2021, elects 40 of the 90 members of the Legislative Council. Established by Annex I of the Basic Law of Hong Kong which states that "the Chief Executive shall be elected by a broadly representative Election Committee in accordance with this Law and appointed by the Central People's Government (State Council)." It is formed and performs its selection function once every five years, even in the event of a CE not completing their term. The membership of the Election Committee was expanded to 1,500 under the massive overhaul of the electoral system in 2021. The Election Committee has been criticised for its "small-circle" electoral basis and its composition favouring pro-Beijing and business interests.

== History ==
The Sino-British Joint Declaration of 1984 provides that the Chief Executive "shall be selected by elections or through consultations held locally and be appointed by the Central People's Government. The system of Election Committee established in the Basic Law to provide an indirect election for the Chief Executive by a 'broadly representative' Election Committee." Besides the first Chief Executive was elected by the 400-member Selection Committee, all Chief Executives since then have been elected by the Election Committee.

The New York Times wrote that sectors that were politically closer to Beijing, such as traditional Chinese medicine, were over-represented in proportion to their share of the population, when compared to sectors deemed hostile, such as social workers or lawyers.

Since the electors must serve for no more than five years, a new election must occur, and the Chief Executive resignation would cause an interesting matter of timing, as to whether the old or new college of electors would select the new Chief Executive.

From 1998 to 2012, the 800 members of the Election Committee comprised 664 nominated from the sectors of the economy, 40 from the religious organisations, and 96 ex officio members taken from the government. The number of members of the Election Committee increased from 800 to 1,200 after the breakthrough on the electoral reform in 2010 for the 2012 Chief Executive election. After a nine-hour debate on the consultation document, the resolution which increased the size of the Election Committee won endorsement at 2:20 p.m. on 24 June by the legislature 46 votes to 13. Ten pan-democrats, including eight Democratic Party legislators, supported the proposals.

Composition of the Election Committee
	1998	2000	2006	2011	2016	2021
Ex Officio members	96 (12%)			96 (8%)	106 (8.83%)	377 (25.13%)
Nominated members	40 (5%)			60 (5%)		156 (10.4%)
Returned with body votes	360 (45%)			510 (42.5%)		674 (44.9%)
Returned with individual votes	304 (38%)			534 (44.5%)	524 (43.7%)	293 (19.53%)

=== 2021 reform ===
In March 2021 the National People's Congress of China passed a new law that would change the electoral system in Hong Kong. The size of the Election Committee will grow from 1,200 to 1,500 members. The new members of the Election Committee will include 'patriotic groups', members of the Chinese People's Political Consultative Conference, Area Committees and District Fight Crime Committees. Those groups will make up 156 seats in the Election Committee and 27 seats will be given to Hongkongers based in mainland China. The 117 seats of the District Councils will be removed. The Election Committee will elect 40 member for the Legislative Council which will be the biggest share of the council and every candidate that would run for the council would need nominations from the five sub sectors in the Election Committee.

The key changes to the formation of the Election Committee are detailed in Annex I of the Basic Law, amended on 30 March 2021 by the Standing Committee of the National People's Congress as follows:

- Reduction of the number of subsectors with individual votes and elimination of mixed individual and body voting; the Election Committee would be principally elected by body votes
- Half of seats (150 seats) in the Third Sector nominated by members of national professional organisations or filled by ex officio members
- Elimination of District Council subsectors; replaced by subsectors consisting of representatives of members of Area Committees, District Fight Crime Committees, and District Fire Safety Committees
- All HKSAR members of the National People's Congress and National Committee Chinese People’s Political Consultative Conference serve as ex officio Election Committee members
- Introduction of subsectors consisting of grassroot organisations, associations of Chinese Fellow Townsmen, associations of Hong Kong residents in Mainland and Hong Kong members of relevant national organisations
- Creation of a convenor system for the Election Committee; an Election Committee member holding an office of state leadership is to serve as the Chief Convenor, who designated a number of convenors for each subsector

== Composition ==
The 1,500-member Election Committee elected in 2021
Sector	Subsector	Seats	Registered voters
First Sector		300	1,646
I	Industrial (First)	17	35
I	Industrial (Second)	17	97
I	Textiles and Garment	17	57
I	Commercial (First)	17	22
I	Commercial (Second)	17	71
I	Commercial (Third) (Note: Former Hong Kong Chinese Enterprises Association renamed.)	17	93
I	Finance	17	55
I	Financial Services	17	195
I	Insurance	17	88
I	Real Estate and Construction	17	91
I	Transport	17	199
I	Import and Export	17	45
I	Tourism	17	131
I	Hotel	16	57
I	Catering	16	135
I	Wholesale and Retail	17	63
I	Employers' Federation of Hong Kong	15	18
I	Small and Medium Enterprises	17	194
Second Sector		300	2,488
II	Technology and Innovation (Note: Information Technology subsector replaced.)	30	54
II	Engineering	30	60
II	Architectural, Surveying, Planning and Landscape	30	55
II	Accountancy	30	39
II	Legal	30	30
II	Education (Note: Education and Higher Education subsectors merged.)	30	1,750
II	Sports, Performing Arts, Culture and Publication (Note: Originally under the Third Sector.)	30	223
II	Medical and Health Services (Note: Medical and Health Services subsectors merged.)	30	82
II	Chinese Medicine	30	51
II	Social Welfare	30	144
Third Sector		300	1,286
III	Agriculture and Fisheries	60	151
III	Labour	60	407
III	Grassroots associations	60	404
III	Associations of Chinese Fellow Townsmen	60	324
III	Religious	60	N/A
Fourth Sector		300	2,100
IV	Members of the Legislative Council	90	N/A
IV	Heung Yee Kuk	27	160
IV	Representatives of Members of Area Committees, District Fight Crime Committees, and District Fire Safety Committees of Hong Kong Island and Kowloon (Note: Hong Kong and Kowloon District Councils subsector replaced.)	76	1,083
IV	Representatives of Members of Area Committees, District Fight Crime Committees, and District Fire Safety Committees of the New Territories (Note: New Territories District Councils subsector replaced.)	80	857
IV	Representatives of Associations of Hong Kong Residents in the Mainland	27	N/A
Fifth Sector		300	451
V	HKSAR Deputies to the NPC and HKSAR Members of the CPPCC National Committee (Note: Originally from the Fourth Sector, two subsectors are combined.)	190	N/A
V	Representatives of Hong Kong Members of Relevant National Organisations	110	451

The Election Committee has five sectors, each composed of a number of subsectors (with a total of 38 subsectors). Amongst the 38 subsectors, members of 35 subsectors are returned by elections. The Annex I of Basic Law states that the Election Committee shall be composed of 1,500 members from the five sectors:

1. Industrial, commercial and financial sectors: 300 members
2. The professions: 300 members
3. Grassroots, labour, religious and other sectors: 300 members
4. Members of the Legislative Council, representatives of district organisations and other organisations: 300 members
5. Hong Kong Special Administrative Region deputies to the National People's Congress, Hong Kong Special Administrative Region members of the National Committee of the Chinese People's Political Consultative Conference and representatives of Hong Kong members of relevant national organisations: 300 members

=== First sector ===
The first sector composed of members from industrial, commercial and financial backgrounds. They are mostly elected by corporate votes and is the highest portion of uncontested subsectors. It includes the following subsectors:

==== Catering ====
The Catering Subsector is corresponding to the Catering functional constituency and contains both corporate and individual members who hold food licences and/or members of the Association such as the Association for the Hong Kong Catering Services Management, the Hong Kong Catering Industry Association and the Association of Restaurant Managers. Individual voters take the 94% of the electorate as the number of the individuals and corporates both registered as voters has grown significantly. The Catering Subsector had contested in 1998 and 2000 with the low turnout rate of 11% in both years.

==== Commercial (First) ====
The Commercial (First) Subsector has a corresponding functional constituency Commercial (First) and consists of corporate members of the Hong Kong General Chamber of Commerce who are allowed to vote at general meetings. The corporate voters in the Subsector had dropped from in 1,293 in 1998 to 990 in 2006. The Subsector had contested in the 1998 and 2000 elections and the voter turnout rate were 45.34% and 30.91% respectively.

==== Commercial (Second) ====
The Commercial (Second) Subsector has a corresponding functional constituency Commercial (Second) and consists of individual and corporate members of the Chinese General Chamber of Commerce who are allowed to vote at general meetings. The electorate remained unchanged from 1998 to 2009 and electorates are equally divided between corporates and individuals. The Commercial (Second) Subsector did not have a contested election in 1998 and 2000.

==== Employers' Federation of Hong Kong ====
The Employers' Federation of Hong Kong Subsector is one of the five subsectors without a corresponding functional constituency. It is composed of corporations including banking and financial services, hotel and catering, industrial and manufacturing, insurance, professional and business services, construction, shipping, trading, distribution, and transportation companies who are members of the Employers' Federation of Hong Kong and entitled to vote at general meetings. There were 112 bodies registered as electors in 2000. They had a contested election in 1998 and was uncontested in 2000.

==== Finance ====
The Finance Subsector is corresponding to the Finance functional constituency and consists of corporate bodies that are banks and deposit-taking companies. In 2006 there were 136 corporate bodies registered as electors. Finance Subsector had contested elections in the 1998, 2000 and the 2002 by-election. The voter turnout in the 1998 and 2000 elections were 81.56% and 70.29% respectively. In the 2002 by-election there were only two candidates running for one seat with 24.39% turnout rate.

==== Financial Services ====
The Financial Service Subsector has a corresponding Financial Services functional constituency. From 1998 to 2004 the Subsector included both individuals and corporations who are exchange participants of an exchange company or corporate members entitled to vote at the general meetings at the Chinese Gold & Silver Exchange Society. 116 individuals and bodies were the registered electorates before 2004 and beginning in 2006 the Subsector came to consist of Stock Exchange Hong Kong, Hong Kong Futures Exchange, and members of the Chinese Gold & Silver Exchange Society which are only corporate members. The Subsector has remained a highly contested subsector in the 1998, 2000 and 2006 elections with about 65% turnout rate.

==== Hong Kong Chinese Enterprises Association ====
The Hong Kong Chinese Enterprises Association subsector is another subsector of the five without an equivalent functional constituency. It consists of individuals and corporations who are members of the Hong Kong Chinese Enterprises Association and allowed to vote at general meetings. The association was established in 1991 and its membership includes companies which are registered in Hong Kong, solely-funded or joint ventures with their original capital from Mainland China. The corporate voters continue to dominate with 220, 99.5% of the electorate in 1996 were corporations, 310, 97.1% in 2006. The Hong Kong Chinese Enterprises Association Subsector never had a contested election.

==== Hotel ====
The Hotel Subsector when taken together with the Tourism Subsector corresponds with the Tourism functional constituency. The Hotel Subsector is formed from corporations who are members of the Hong Kong Hotels Association or the Federation of Hong Kong Hotel Owners eligible to vote at the general meetings. There were 81 registered bodies in 1998 and 95 in 2006. The Subsector had elections in 1998 and 2006 with high turnout of 85% and 81.05% respectively. The 1998 election was competitive with 18 candidates running for 11 seats, and 15 candidates running for 11 seats in 2006.

==== Import and Export ====
The Import and Export Subsector corresponds with the Import and Export functional constituency and currently consists of corporations and individuals who are members of the Hong Kong Chinese Importers' and Exporters' Association and companies which are licensed to import and export dutiable commodities, motor vehicles and chemicals. In 2006 there were 777 registered corporate electors and 615 individual electors. The Import and Export Subsector had only a contested election in 1998 with turnout rate of 34.55%.

==== Industrial (First) ====
The Industrial (First) Subsector corresponds to the Industrial (First) functional constituency. It is composed of both individual and corporate members of the Federation of Hong Kong Industries who are entitled to vote at general meetings. In 2004 and 2006 there were no individuals registered electors and there were 794 and 743 corporations registered respectively. The Subsector held elections in 1998 and 2000 and in the 2000 election there were 23 candidates running for 12 seats.

==== Industrial (Second) ====
The Industrial (Second) Subsector is corresponding to the Industrial (Second) functional constituency of the same corporate members of the Chinese Manufacturers' Association of Hong Kong that are entitled to vote at general meetings. In 2006 there were 517 registered corporate electors. The Industrial (Second) Subsector never had a contested election.

==== Insurance ====
The Insurance Subsector corresponds with the Insurance functional constituency and contains companies who are authorised or deemed authorised insurers. The makeup of the Subsector's electorate has changed very little since 1998 as there were 192 registered companies and 140 registered in 2006. There were contested elections in 1998, 2000 and 2006 with turnout rates of 87.56%, 76.16% and 65.71%.

==== Real Estate and Construction ====
The Real Estate and Construction Subsector corresponds with the functional constituency Real Estate and Construction and consists of individual and corporate members of the Real Estate Developers Association of Hong Kong, the Hong Kong Construction Association, and the Hong Kong E&M Contractors' Association who are entitled to vote at general meetings. Large increase in the number and proportion of the individual electors was seen from 1998 when there were 62 individuals making up 15.8% of the electorate and 286 comprising 42.2% in 2000. The proportion remained consistent from 2000 to 2006 when there were 427 corporate electors and 292 individuals. The Real Estate and Construction Subsector held contested elections in 1998, 2000, and 2006 with turnout rates of around 65%.

==== Textiles and Garment ====
The Textiles and Garment Subsector has a corresponding functional constituency Textiles and Garment. Corporate members of associations such as the Textile Council of Hong Kong, Federation of Hong Kong Garment Manufacturers, the Hong Kong Chinese Textile Mills Associations, and the Hong Kong Institution of Textile and Apparel who are allowed to vote at general meetings are the electors of this Subsector. Individuals include registered textiles and clothing manufacturers, and registered textile traders. From 1998 and 2000 there was significant increase in registered corporations from 2,690 in 1998 to 4.623 in 2000 and have a large proportion of the electorate. In 2006 there were 3,690 registered corporation (97.6% of the electorate) and 89 registered individuals (2.4% of the electorate). The Subsector held contested elections in 1998, 2006 and the 2005 by-election.

==== Tourism ====
The Tourism Subsector corresponds to the Tourism functional constituency with the Hotel Subsector. It consists of the corporate members of the former Hong Kong Tourist Association, the Travel Industry Council of Hong Kong, and the Board of the Airline Representatives in Hong Kong who are entitled to vote at general meetings. In 2006 there were 887 corporations registered as electors. The Tourism Subsector had contested election in 1998, 2000 and 2006 with voter turnout rates of 63.86%, 50%, and 64.13%. In 2006 it had one of them most highly contested subsector elections with 29 candidates running for 12 seats.

==== Transport ====
The Transport Subsector corresponds to the Transport functional constituency and consists of bodies including the Airport Authority Hong Kong, Hong Kong Public & Maxicab Light Bus United Association, and MTR Corporation. In 2006 there were 179 registered corporate electors and the number remained little changed. The Transport Subsector held contested elections in 1998, 2000, and 2006.

==== Wholesale and Retail ====
The Wholesale and Retail Subsector is corresponding the Wholesale and Retail functional constituency and consists of both corporate and individual members of 84 different associations including the Chinese Merchants (H.K.) Association, Hong Kong Retail Management Association, and Chinese Medicine Merchants Association. The Wholesale and Retail had contested elections in 1998, 2000 and 2006 with relatively low turnout rates of 34.56%, 28.66%, and 32.26% respectively.

=== Second Sector ===
==== Accountancy ====
The Accountancy Subsector is corresponding to the Accountancy functional constituency and includes individuals who are certified public accountants. The number of registered individuals in 1998 was 9,897 and 20,765 in 2006. The Subsector has held contested elections in 1998, 2000, and 2006 as well as the 2005 by-election. It has been one of the most highly contested subsectors with an average of 2.04 candidates per seats and 12 candidates for 3 open seats in the 2005 by-election. The turnout rate remained low with an average of 20.03% for 1998, 2000, and 2006 elections and 12.14% in the 2005 by-election.

15 seats of the Accountancy sub-sector are nominated from among the Hong Kong Accounting Advisors appointed by the Ministry of Finance of the People's Republic of China.

==== Architectural, Surveying, Planning and Landscape ====
The Architectural, Surveying, Planning and Landscape Subsector, formerly called Architectural, Surveying and Planning, has a corresponding Architectural, Surveying, Planning and Landscape functional constituency. It consists of individuals who are registered architects, landscape architects, surveyors, planners or individual members of the organisations such as the Hong Kong Institute of Architects, the Hong Kong Institute of Surveyors and the Hong Kong Institute of Planners entitled to vote a general meetings. Registered landscape architects were not included in the electorate until 2000. In 2006 there were 5,584 registered individuals. The Architectural, Surveying and Planning Subsector had contested elections in 1998, 2000, 2006, and the 2005 by-election. There were 28 and 40 candidates between 2000 and 2006 elections.

15 seats of the Architectural, Surveying, Planning and Landscape sub-sector are ex officio seats filled by responsible persons of statutory bodies, advisory bodies and relevant association:

- President of The Hong Kong Institute of Architects
- President of The Hong Kong Institute of Surveyors
- President of The Hong Kong Institute of Planners
- President of The Hong Kong Institute of Landscape Architects
- Chairman of the Hong Kong Housing Authority
- Chairman of the Town Planning Board
- Chairman of the Board of the Urban Renewal Authority
- Chairman of the Hong Kong Housing Society
- Chairman of the Antiquities Advisory Board
- Chairperson of the Property Management Services Authority
- Chairman of the Community Involvement Committee on Greening
- Chairman of the Advisory Committee for the Fire Safety (Buildings) Ordinance and the Fire Safety (Commercial Premises) Ordinance
- Chairman of the Harbourfront Commission
- Chairman of the Land and Development Advisory Committee
- Chairman of the Lantau Development Advisory Committee

==== Chinese Medicine ====
The Chinese Medicine Subsector is one of the five subsectors without a corresponding functional constituency. It consists of individual members of ten organisations including the Hong Kong Association of Traditional Medicine, Hong Kong Chinese Herbalists Association, and Society of Practitioners of Chinese Herbal Medicine who are entitled to vote at general meetings. In 2006 there were 4,250 registered individual electors. This Subsector held contested elections in 1998, 2000, 2006, and the 2005 by-election.

15 seats of the Chinese Medicine sub-sector are nominated from among the Hong Kong members of the Council of the World Federation of Chinese Medicine Societies.

==== Education ====
The Education Subsector corresponds with the Education functional constituency. It is formed by a merger with the former Higher Education Subsector. It has the largest electorate of all subsectors and includes full-time academic staff who are teachers or administrators in publicly funded universities, approved secondary colleges, technical colleges and certain tertiary institutions, members of academic councils, registered teachers, principals, and managers of schools, as well as teachers in institutions such as industrial training centres, technical institutes, and the Caritas Lok Mo Integrated Vocational Training Centre of Caritas.

The former Education Subsector held contested elections in 1998, 2000, and 2006. There has been a high level of candidates with an average of 35 candidates for 20 seats. The voter turnout rate remained low with an average of 20.03% in the three elections. In 2006 there were 78,840 registered individual electors. The former Higher Education subsector consisted of 6,856 registered individual electorates in 2006 and is increasingly competitive with 27 candidates in 1998 and 49 in 2006 running for 20 seats.

10 seats of the Education sub-sector are ex officio seats filled by Vice-Chancellor or Presidents of universities:

- Vice-Chancellor of The University of Hong Kong
- Vice-Chancellor of The Chinese University of Hong Kong
- President of The Hong Kong University of Science and Technology
- President of the City University of Hong Kong
- President of The Hong Kong Polytechnic University
- President of The Education University of Hong Kong
- President and vice-chancellor of the Hong Kong Baptist University
- President of Lingnan University
- President of The Open University of Hong Kong
- President of the Hong Kong Shue Yan University
- President of The Hang Seng University of Hong Kong

10 seats of the Education sub-sector are ex officio seats filled by offices specified by sponsoring bodies which operate secondary schools, primary schools and kindergarten that receive recurrent funding from the Government, and the total number of schools managed by the school sponsoring bodies are among the top five of all school sponsoring bodies:

- the office specified by Roman Catholic Diocese of Hong Kong
- the office specified by the Po Leung Kuk
- the office specified by the Hong Kong Sheng Kung Hui
- the office specified by the Tung Wah Group of Hospitals
- the office specified by The Hong Kong Council of the Church of Christ in China

==== Engineering ====
The Engineering Subsector corresponds with the Engineering functional constituency and consists of individuals who are professional engineers and members of the Hong Kong Institution of Engineers who are entitled to vote at general meetings. In 2006 there were 7,742 registered individual electors. There were contested elections in 1998, 2000, 2006, and the 2005 by-election.

15 seats of the Engineering sub-sector are ex officio seats filled by responsible persons of statutory bodies, advisory bodies and relevant association:

- President of The Hong Kong Institution of Engineers
- Chairman of the Board of the Airport Authority Hong Kong
- Chairman of the Consulting Engineers’ Committee
- Chairperson of the Construction Industry Council (Hong Kong)
- Chairman of the Building Contractors Committee
- Chairman of the Advisory Committee on Water Supplies
- Chairman of the Transport Advisory Committee
- Chairman of the Advisory Council on the Environment
- Chairman of the Electrical Safety Advisory Committee
- Chairman of the Gas Safety Advisory Committee
- Chairman of the Energy Advisory Committee
- Chairman of the Advisory Committee on the Appearance of Bridges and Associated Structures
- Chairman of Lift and Escalator Safety Advisory Committee
- Chairman of the Board of MTR Corporation
- Chairperson of the Drinking Water Safety Advisory Committee

==== Medical and Health Services ====
The Medical and Health Services Subsector is formed in the 2021 Hong Kong electoral changes upon the merger of the Medical Subsector and Health Services subsector.

The former Medical subsector is corresponding to the former Medical functional constituency which is composed of registered medical practitioners and registered dentists. In 1998 there were 6,784 individual electors and increased to 10,087 in 2006. In 2006 it was one of the most highly contested subsectors with 63 candidates running for 20 seats. The former Health Services subsector, corresponding to the former Health Services functional constituency, includes registered members of various professions in government or public institutions such as chiropractors, nurses, pharmacists, midwives, optometrists, and physiotherapists. There were changes in the membership such as the omission of the members of the Hong Kong Chiropractors' Association entitled to vote at general meetings since 2001.

15 seats of the Medical and Health Services sub-sector are ex officio seats filled by responsible persons of statutory bodies, advisory bodies and relevant association:

- Chairman of the Hospital Authority
- Chairman of the Board of Governors of The Prince Philip Dental Hospital
- Chairman of the Medical Council of Hong Kong
- Chairman of the Dental Council of Hong Kong
- President of the Hong Kong Academic of Medicine
- Chairman of the Nursing Council of Hong Kong
- Chairman of the Midwives Council of Hong Kong
- Chairman of the Supplementary Medical Professions Council of Hong Kong
- Chairman of the Pharmacy and Poisons Board
- Chairman of the Chiropractors Board
- Dean of Li Ka Shing Faculty of Medicine of The University of Hong Kong
- Dean of the Faculty of Medicine of The Chinese University of Hong Kong
- Chairman of the Human Organ Transplant Board
- Council Chairman of the Hong Kong St. John Ambulance
- Commissioner of the Auxiliary Medical Service

==== Legal ====
The Legal Subsector is corresponding to the Legal functional constituency and consists of members of the Law Society of Hong Kong and the Hong Kong Bar Association who are entitled to vote at general meetings as well as legal officers. In 2006 there were 5,560 registered individual electors. The Subsector has always had contested including the by-elections in 2002 and 2005.

Under the 2021 Hong Kong electoral changes, 9 seats of the Legal sub-sector are ex officio seats filled by Hong Kong members of the Committee for the Basic Law of the HKSAR under the Standing Committee of the National People's Congress. 6 seats of the subsector are nominated from among Hong Kong members of the Council of the China Law Society.

==== Social Welfare ====
The Social Welfare Subsector shares a similar but broader electorate base with the Social Welfare functional constituency. It includes both individuals registered as social workers and corporate members of the Hong Kong Council of Social Service who is entitled to vote at general meetings. It also consists of social services societies and registered non-profit companies. There were 11,410 registered individuals and 261 registered bodies in 2006. It was the most highly contested subsector in 2006 with 99 candidates running for 40 seats.

Under the 2021 Hong Kong electoral changes, the Social Welfare Subsector was moved from the Third Sector to the Second Sector with seats halved. 15 seats of the Social Welfare sub-sector are ex officio seats filled by responsible persons of statutory bodies, advisory bodies and relevant association:

- Chairperson of the Executive Council of the Hong Kong Council for Social Service
- Chairperson of the Social Workers Registration Board
- Chairman of the Council of the Institute of Social Service Development
- Chairman of the Board of Directors of the Tung Wah Group of Hospitals
- Chairman of the Board of Directors of the Po Leung Kuk
- Chairman of the Board of Directors of the Yan Chai Hospital
- Chairman of the Board of Directors of Pok Oi Hospital
- Chairman of the Board of Directors of Yan Oi Tong Limited
- Chairman of the Executive Committee of The Lok Sin Tong Benevolent Society Kowloon
- Chairman of the Board of Directors of the New Home Association Limited
- Chairperson of the Board of Directors of the Social Workers Across Borders Limited
- Chairperson of the Board of Directors of The Hong Kong Volunteers Federation Company Ltd.
- Chairperson of the Council of The Hong Kong Federation of Trade Unions Hong Ling Society
- Chairperson of the Executive Committee of The United Labour Chi Hong Association Limited
- Chairman of the Board of Directors of the Hong Kong Island Social Services Charitable Ltd.

==== Sports, Performing Arts, Culture and Publication ====
The Sports, Performing Arts, Culture and Publication Subsector has a corresponding Sports, Performing Arts, Culture and Publication functional constituency and includes relevant registered statutory bodies, sports associations, designated district sports associations, such as the North District Sports Association, district arts and culture associations, such as the Sha Tin Arts Association, and other designated bodies such as the Hong Kong Chinese Orchestra and Hong Kong Film Academy. It also consists of individual and bodies there are members of associations including the Hong Kong Book & Magazine Trade Association, and Hong Kong Theatres Association who are entitled to vote at general meetings. There are also number of media associations such as broadcast, newspaper, and telecommunication corporations. There have been several additions in the membership since 1998. all four sub-subsectors form one subsector they each have their own elections. Up to 2010, the Culture Sub-subsector is the only one to have contested elections in all major elections: 1998, 2000, and 2006. The Performing Arts Sub-subsector had contested elections in 1998 and 2000, and the Sports and Publication Sub-subsectors only had contested election in 1998.

Under the 2021 Hong Kong electoral changes, the Sports, Performing Arts, Culture and Publication Subsector was moved from the Third Sector to the Second Sector with seats halved. 3 seats of the subsector are nominated by the Sports Federation and Olympic Committee of Hong Kong, China, 9 seats are nominated by the China Federation of Literary and Art Circles Hong Kong Member Association and a further 3 seats nominated by the Hong Kong Publishing Federation.

==== Technology and Innovation ====
The former Information Technology Subsector corresponds with the Information Technology functional constituency and is composed of individuals who are members of relevant organisations including the Hong Kong Computer Society, the Institute of Electrical and Electronics Engineers, and the corporate members of bodies such as the Hong Kong Information Technology Federation, Hong Kong Wireless Technology Industry, and Society of Hong Kong External Telecommunications Services Providers who are eligible to vote at genera meetings, as well as corporations with certain licences granted by the Telecommunication Authority. In 2006 there were four organisations where individual members were qualified as electorates although they were not allowed to vote in general meetings such as the Professional Information Security Association and the Hong Kong & Mainland Software Industry Cooperation Association. Since 1998 there have been a number of additional associations included in the electorate. In 2006 there were 4,743 individuals and 261 registered corporations.

Under the 2021 Hong Kong electoral changes, the Information Technology Subsector was replaced by the new Technology and Innovation Subsector with a significantly diminished electoral base. 15 seats of the sub-sector are nominated from among the Hong Kong academicians of the Chinese Academy of Sciences or the Chinese Academy of Engineering.

=== Third Sector ===
==== Agriculture and Fisheries ====
The Agriculture and Fisheries Subsector has a corresponding functional constituency Agriculture and Fisheries. It consists of 79 corporate bodies including the Hong Kong and Kowloon Fishermen Association, Hong Kong Livestock Industry Association, and Hong Kong Florists Association and also corporate members of bodies such as Federation of Hong Kong Aquaculture Associations, and Federation of Vegetable Marketing Co-operative Societies. It consists of a small number of electorate with only 160 corporate electorates in 2006. The Subsector had contested elections in 1998 and the 2005 by-election.

==== Labour ====
The Labour Subsector corresponds with the Labour functional constituency and consists of registered trade unions. In 2006 there were 554 registered association electors.

==== Religious ====
The Religious Subsector has no corresponding functional constituency. The Subsector is composed of six Hong Kong designated bodies representing Buddhists, Catholics, Confucians, Muslims, Christians (Protestants) and Taoists, namely the Catholic Diocese of Hong Kong, the Chinese Muslim Cultural and Fraternal Association, the Hong Kong Christian Council, the Hong Kong Taoist Association, the Confucian Academy, and the Hong Kong Buddhist Association. These six bodies are all members of the Hong Kong Colloquium for Religious Leaders. It was allocated 40 seats on the Election Committee in 2000.

=== Fourth Sector ===
==== Legislative Council ====
The Legislative Council Subsector includes 90 members of the Legislative Council of Hong Kong (increased from 70 members after 2021) who are all ex officio members automatically become the member of the Subsector. No election is to be held in this Subsector.

==== Heung Yee Kuk ====
The Heung Yee Kuk Subsector corresponds to the Heung Yee Kuk functional constituency in which the chairman, Vice-Chairman of the Heung Yee Kuk (Rural Council) and ex officio Special and Co-opted Councillors of the full council are the electorate. In 2006 there were 147 individuals registered as electors. There were contested elections in 1998, 2000 and the 2002 by-election but these elections were not competitive with 22 candidates in 1998 and 23 in 2000 running for 21 seats. Due to the fact the electorate is small, the turnout rates have been relatively high with 83.81% in 1998 and 73.43% in 2000.

=== Area Committees, District Fight Crime Committees, and District Fire Safety Committees ===
The subsectors of Representatives of members of Area Committees, District Fight Crime Committees, and District Fire Safety Committees of Hong Kong Island and Kowloon and the New Territories were respectively established under the 2021 Hong Kong electoral changes, to be returned from:

- Members of Area Committees
- Members of District Fight Crime Committees
- Members of District Fire Safety Committees

==== Representatives of associations of Hong Kong residents in the Mainland ====
Under the 2021 Hong Kong electoral changes, the Representatives of associations of Hong Kong residents in the Mainland subsector was created with one member nominated by each of the prescribed associations:

- Mainland China (Shenzhen) Consultant Services, HKFTU
- Mainland China (Guangzhou) Consultant Services, HKFTU
- Mainland China (Dongguan) Consultant Services, HKFTU
- Mainland China (Zhongshan) Consultant Services, HKFTU
- Mainland China (Huizhou) Consultant Services, HKFTU
- Mainland China (Fuzhou, Xiamen) Consultant Services, HKFTU
- Hong Kong Chamber of Commerce in China
- Hong Kong Chamber of Commerce in China - Tianjin
- Hong Kong Chamber of Commerce in China - Shanghai
- Hong Kong Chamber of Commerce in China - Zhejiang
- Hong Kong Chamber of Commerce in China - Guangdong
- Hong Kong Chamber of Commerce in China - Fujian
- Hong Kong Chamber of Commerce in China - Guangxi
- Hong Kong Chamber of Commerce in China - Sichuan
- Hong Kong Chamber of Commerce in China - Wuhan
- Hong Kong Chamber of Commerce in China - Liaoning
- Hong Kong Chamber of Commerce in China - Shandong
- Hong Kong Professionals (Beijing) Association
- Shanghai Hong Kong Association
- Guangzhou Tianhe Hong Kong and Macau Association
- Hong Kong Association of China Business
- Hong Kong Chamber of Commerce, Qianhai, Shenzhen
- Hong Kong and Macau Entrepreneurs Branch, Chongqing Overseas Association
- Fujian Federation of Overseas Chinese Entrepreneurs
- Hong Kong and Macao Youth Innovation and Entrepreneurship Federation in Zhongkai Huizhou
- The Hong Kong Fellowship in Huadu Guangzhou
- The Hong Kong Fellowship in Chancheng Foshan

=== Fifth Sector ===
==== National People's Congress ====
The National People's Congress Subsector does not correspond to any Legislative Council's functional constituency but includes the 36 Hong Kong deputies to the National People's Congress of the People's Republic of China. The 36 members automatically become the ex officio member of the Election Committee and there is no election to be held.

==== Chinese People's Political Consultative Conference ====
The Chinese People's Political Consultative Conference does not have corresponding Legislative Council's functional constituency but it includes all Hong Kong members of the National Committee of the Chinese People's Political Consultative Conference of the People's Republic of China. In 2006 there were 118 individuals in the electorate. This Subsector has never held a contested election.

An HKSAR deputy to the NPC or an HKSAR member of the CPPCC National Committee may choose to register as an Election Committee member in a subsector other than one in the Fifth Sector with which he or she has a substantial connection. In these cases, the number of ex officio members will be increased and the number of seats to be returned by the subsector by election will be reduced accordingly.

==== Representatives of Hong Kong members of relevant national organisations ====
The subsector was established under the 2021 Hong Kong electoral changes, to be returned from:

- HKSAR Delegates of the All-China Women's Association
- HKSAR Executive Members of the All-China Federation of Industry and Commerce
- HKSAR Committee Members of the All-China Federation of Returned Overseas Chinese
- HKSAR Committee Members of the All-China Youth Federation
- HKSAR Directors of the China Overseas Friendship Association

=== Former Subsectors ===
==== Provisional District Boards for the Districts in the Regional Council Area ====
The Provisional District Boards for the Districts in the Regional Council Area Subsector was created in 1998 and replaced by the New Territories District Council Subsector in 2000. It held a contested election in 1998 with 23 candidates running for 21 seats. The voter turnout rate was 68.75%.

==== Provisional District Boards for the Districts in the Urban Council Area ====
The Provisional District Boards for the Districts in the Urban Council Area Subsector existed between 1998 and 2000 and was replaced by the Hong Kong and Kowloon District Council Subsector. It held a contested election in 1998 with 37 candidates running for 21 seats. The voter turnout rate was 79.48%.

==== Hong Kong and Kowloon District Councils ====
The Hong Kong and Kowloon District Councils Subsector was first introduced in 2000 after the Provisional District Council Subsector was abolished. This Subsector when combined with the New Territories District Councils Subsector corresponds to the District Council (First) functional constituency. It includes the members of the District Councils in Hong Kong and Kowloon. In 2006 there were 221 registered individual electors. This Subsector has become increasingly competitive with 25 candidates in 2000 to 33 candidates in 2006 running for 21 seats.

==== New Territories District Councils ====
The New Territories District Councils Subsector was first introduced in 2000, replacing the Provisional District Council Subsector. Together with the Hong Kong and Kowloon District Councils Subsector it corresponds to the District Council (First) functional constituency. It has 230 registered electors in 2006 who are the members of the District Councils in New Territories. In the 2000 elections there were 23 candidates and 40 in 2006.

== Process ==
=== Choosing the Members of the Election Committee ===
Each of the 28 functional constituencies receives a set number of electoral votes allocated to them. The block vote is applied to choose the members, as was common in the United States before the modern practice of voting only for a set slate or ticket of electors was established. By-election will be held to update the membership of the Election Committee if there are vacancies in the Election Committee.

- 1998 Election Committee Subsector Elections
- 2000 Election Committee Subsector Elections
- 2002 Election Committee Subsector By-elections
- 2005 Election Committee Subsector By-elections
- 2006 Election Committee Subsector Elections
- 2011 Election Committee Subsector Elections
- 2016 Election Committee Subsector Elections
- 2021 Election Committee Subsector Elections

The Candidate Eligibility Review Committee of the HKSAR shall be responsible for reviewing and confirming the eligibility of candidates for Election Committee members and for the office of Chief Executive. The Committee for Safeguarding National Security of the HKSAR shall, on the basis of the review by the department for safeguarding national security of the Police Force of the HKSAR, make findings as to whether a candidate for Election Committee member or for the office of Chief Executive meets the legal requirements and conditions of upholding the Basic Law of the Hong Kong Special Administrative Region of the People's Republic of China and swearing allegiance to the Hong Kong Special Administrative Region of the People's Republic of China, and issue an opinion to the Candidate Eligibility Review Committee of the HKSAR in respect of a candidate who fails to meet such legal requirements and conditions.

No legal proceedings may be instituted in respect of a decision made by the Candidate Eligibility Review Committee of the HKSAR on the eligibility of a candidate for Election Committee member or for the office of Chief Executive pursuant to the opinion of the Committee for Safeguarding National Security of the HKSAR.

=== Choosing the Chief Executive ===
Each candidate must be validly and legally nominated in order to participate in the election. One of the requirements for eligibility is the nomination of at least 150 members of the Election Committee. Since each elector can only nominate one candidate, 1,051 signatures will guarantee an election unopposed. The college of electors casts the official ballots for the office, with an absolute majority of the votes required to be elected. If no candidate receives an absolute majority (601 votes as it currently stands) a runoff is held on a later date. It is rather unclear what would happen in the case of a tie, since the constitution does not state any tie-breaker formats.

Inauguration Day is set at Hong Kong Special Administrative Region Establishment Day, 1 July, with the elections being held on a date determined by the sitting Chief Executive any time in the six months prior to this date.

Each of the 1,200 members must have publicly declared their preferred choice within the two-week nomination period. According to Ohmynews, "Its very design causes the discourse of democracy to get bandied about as though it were a legitimate feature of the process. Thus, in 2005 the media reported on an 'election campaign' when only 800 individuals are allowed to vote, or refers to Tsang, Beijing's choice, as a 'candidate' when the possibility of his failing is a non-starter. The euphemism, 'small-circle election' is also repeatedly employed to refer to what in reality is a thoroughly undemocratic process."

The 2007 election was the first competitive Chief Executive election featuring two candidates from different political camp as the pan-democracy camp were able to field their candidate to challenge the Beijing-favoured candidate for the first time. It has been said that the competitive nature of this election, with debates held between the candidates, changed Hong Kong's political culture.

- 2002 Hong Kong Chief Executive election
- 2005 Hong Kong Chief Executive election
- 2007 Hong Kong Chief Executive election
- 2012 Hong Kong Chief Executive election
- 2017 Hong Kong Chief Executive election
- 2022 Hong Kong Chief Executive election

=== Choosing the Members of the Legislative Council ===
The Election Committee elected Legislative Council members during 1998 to 2004, which was abolished afterwards until 2021.

As a result of amendments passed in March 2021 for the December 2021 Legislative Council elections, the Election Committee will elect 40 of the 90 members of the Legislative Council. Candidates for members of the Legislative Council returned by the Election Committee shall be nominated by at least 10 but no more than 20 members of the Election Committee, with at least 2 but no more than 4 members from each sector. Any eligible voter in an election of the Legislative Council may be nominated as a candidate. Each Election Committee member may nominate one candidate only.

The Election Committee shall elect members of the Legislative Council from the list of nominations by secret ballot. A ballot paper is valid only if the number of candidates voted for is equal to the number of members of the Legislative Council to be returned. The 40 candidates who obtain the highest numbers of votes shall be elected.

== Criticisms ==
The composition of the Election Committee was criticised for favouring the business interest as the election of the majority of its members was by corporate electors, which effectively incorporating the interests of the business sector. The business sector controls at least a quarter of the seats in the Election Committee as the nature of the composition in the first sector. Additionally, many non-business subsectors are also occupied by businessmen by occupation, for example the sport and culture subsectors and the Hong Kong deputies to the National People's Congress. It was also mocked as "small-circle election" as it had a narrow electorate basis which facilitates the business elites to secure their seats on the committee through personal networks and the support of the Liaison Office.

== See also ==
- List of members of the Election Committee of Hong Kong, 2017–21
- 2010 Hong Kong electoral reform
- 2014–15 Hong Kong electoral reform
- 2021 Hong Kong electoral reform
- Corporatism
