= 2025 Hong Kong Election Committee Subsector by-elections =

2025 Election Committee Subsector by-elections
- 7 September 2025

93 (of the 1,500) seats in the Election Committee
- Registered: 3,631
- Turnout: 3,534 (97.33%)
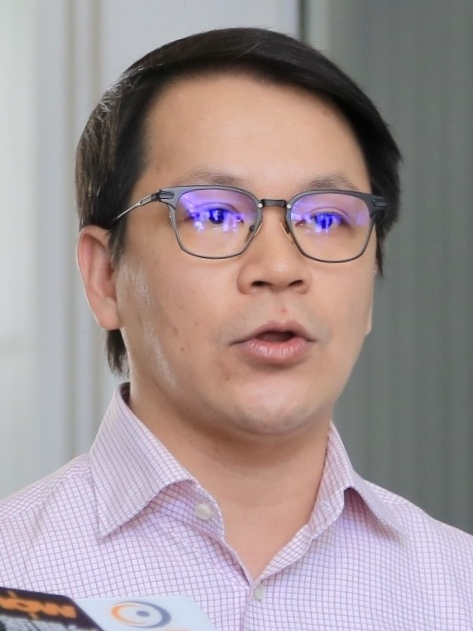

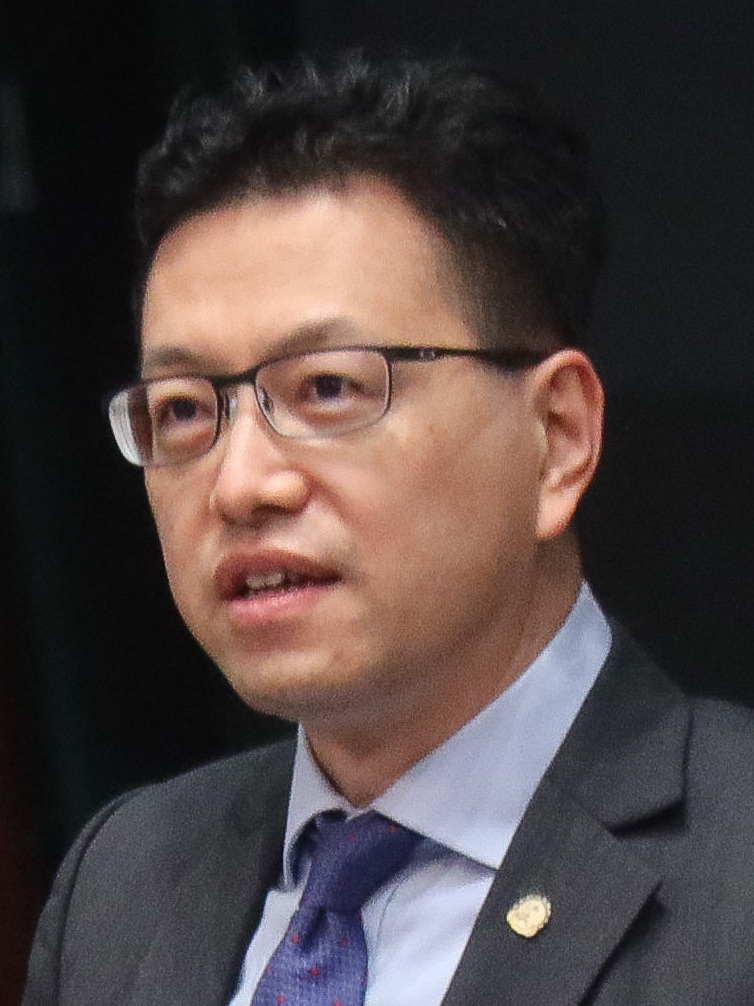

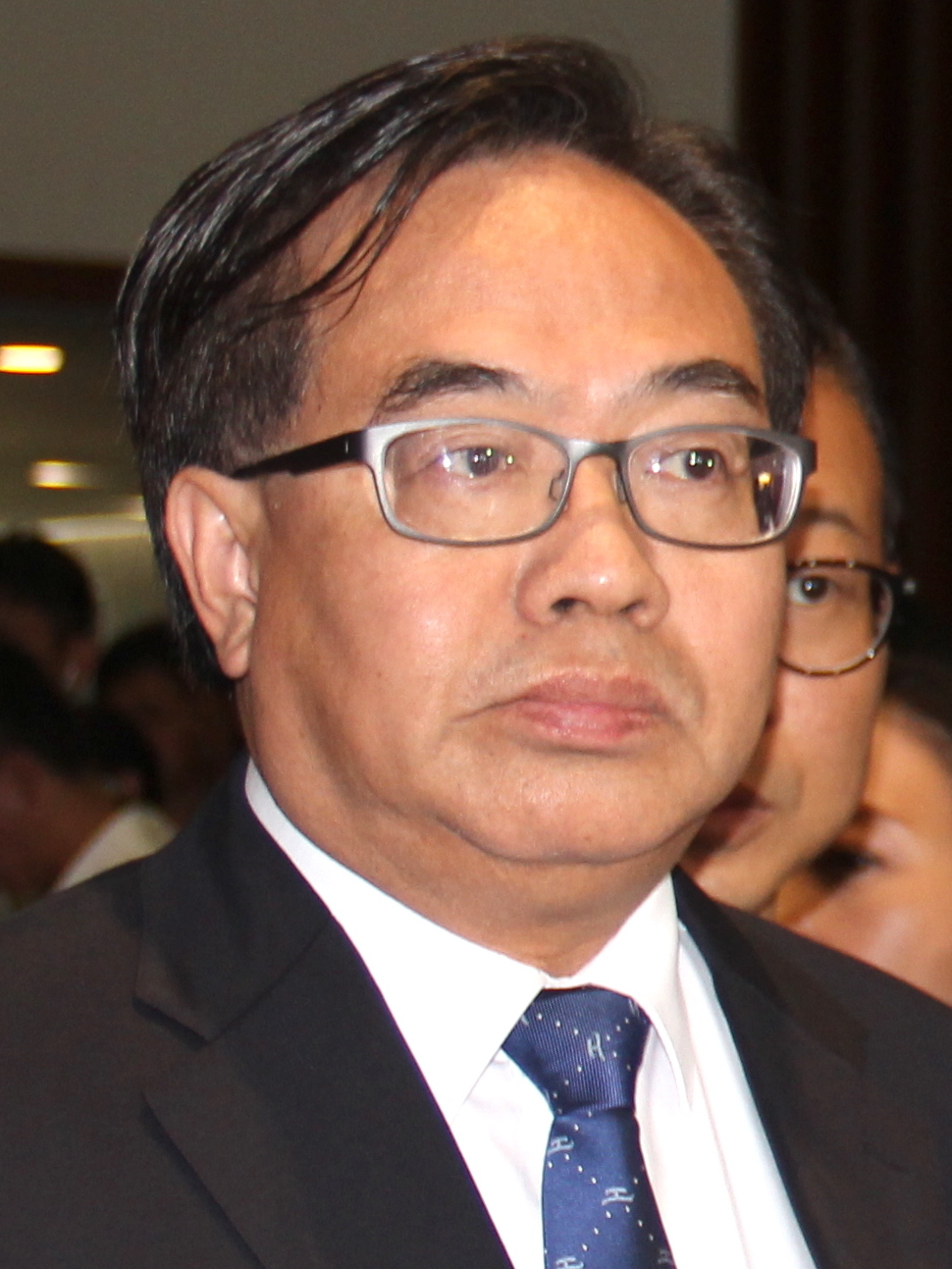

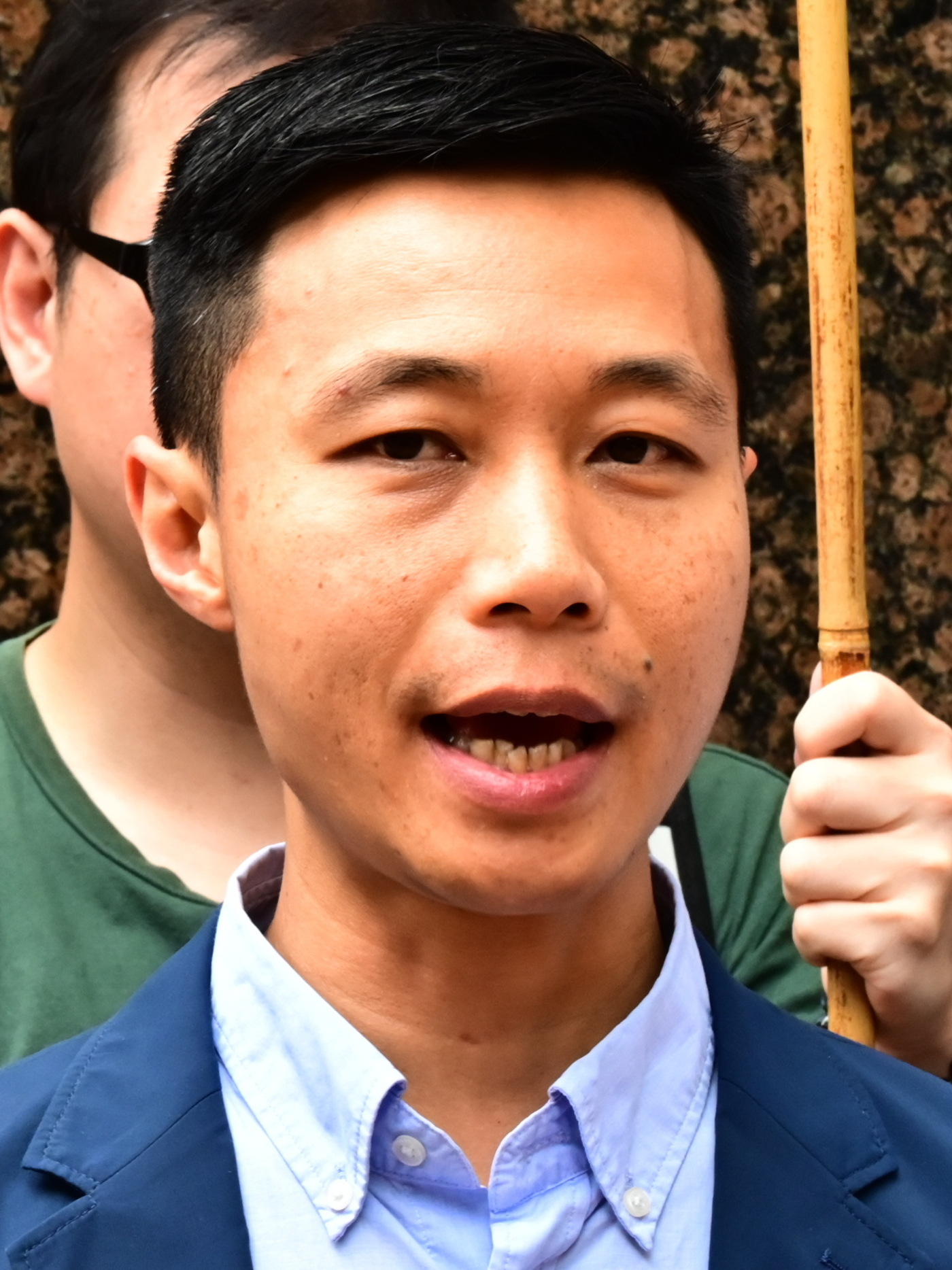

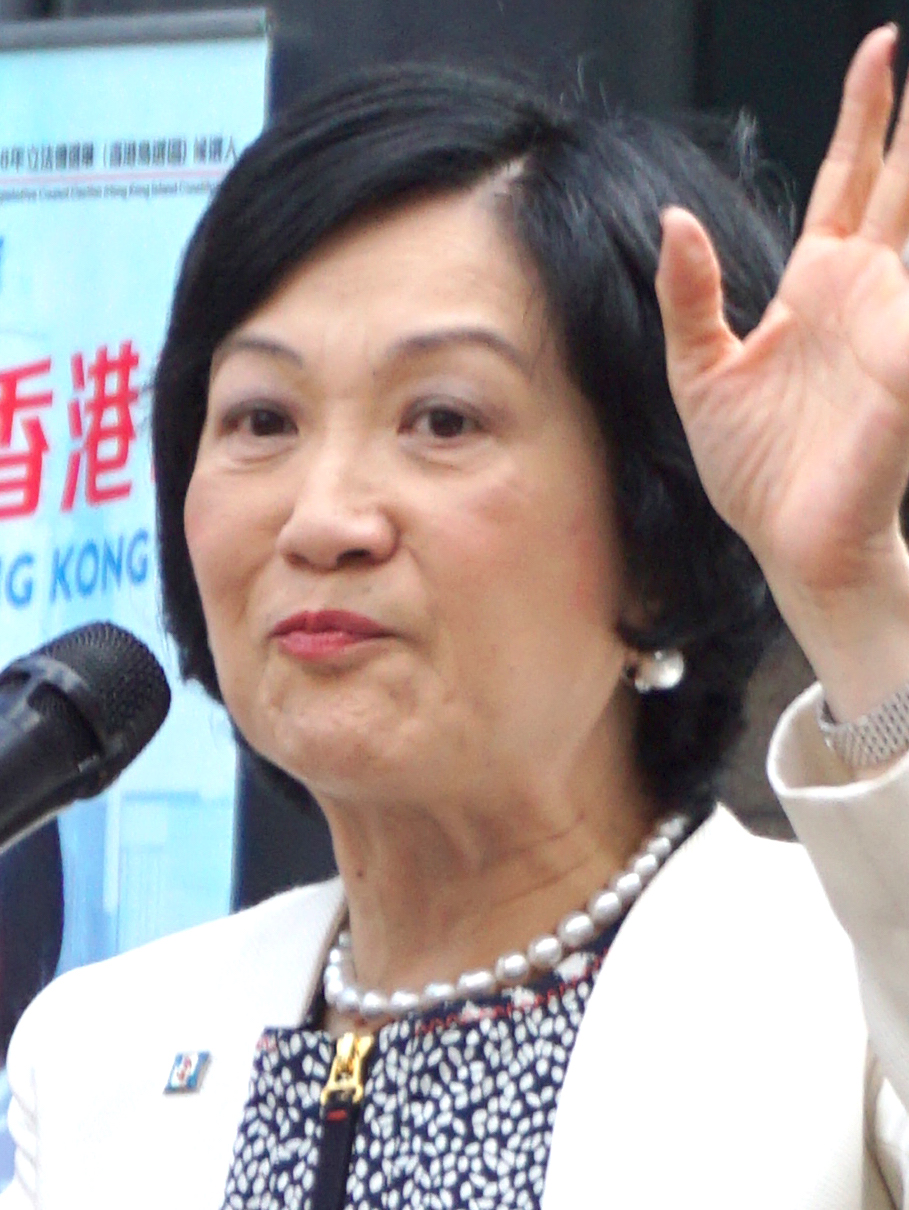

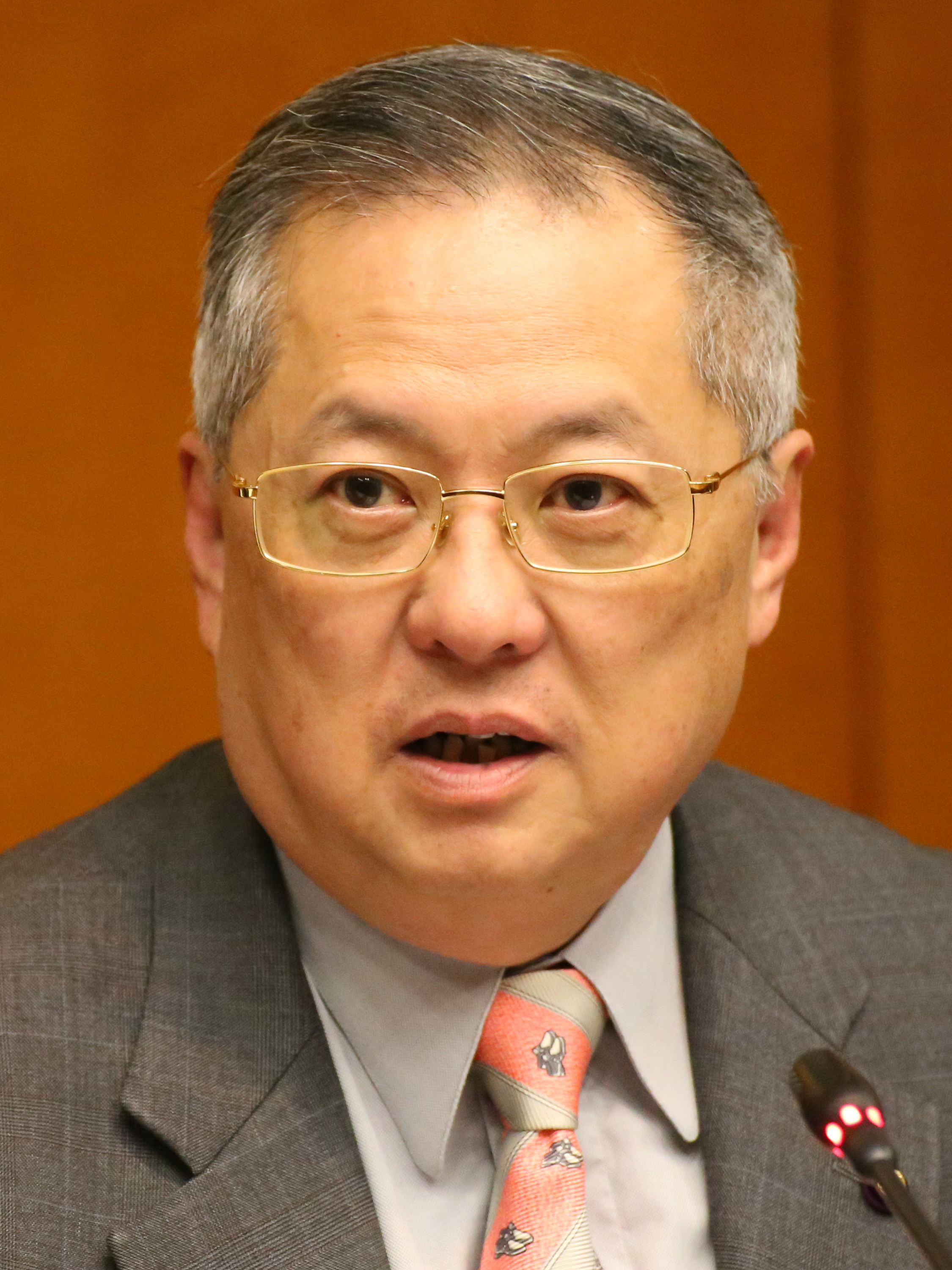
	First party	Second party	Third party
Leader	Gary Chan	Ng Chau-pei	Lo Wai-kwok
Party	DAB	FTU	BPA
Alliance	Pro-Beijing	Pro-Beijing	Pro-Beijing
Seats won	5	4	3
Popular vote	2,245	2,002	Uncontested
Percentage	14.24%	12.70%	N/A
	Fourth party	Fifth party	Sixth party
Leader	Lam Chun-sing	Regina Ip	Tommy Cheung
Party	FLU	NPP	Liberal
Alliance	Pro-Beijing	Pro-Beijing	Pro-Beijing
Seats won	2	2	0
Popular vote	1,653	887	782
Percentage	10.49%	5.63%	4.96%

The 2025 Hong Kong Election Committee Subsector by-elections was held on 7 September 2025 to fill the 93 seats across 28 subsectors of the 1,500-member Election Committee, plus 10 appointed seats through nominations by designated organisations. The Election Committee, which significantly gained power after the political reform in 2021, would select 40 out of the 90 seats in the Legislative Council in December, and the new Chief Executive in 2027.

Nominations opened between 22 July and 4 August, followed by national security vetting through the Candidate Eligibility Review Committee. Amongst the 93 vacancies, 72 seats are uncontested and the respective candidates are expected to be elected automatically. At least a quarter of the candidates are District Councillors, ten are senior executives of Chinese corporations, and two were government officials (former Director-General of Civil Aviation Li Tin-chui and former assistant director of Planning Amy Cheung).

== Results ==
The turnout of the election was 97.33% with 3,534 eligible electorates casting their votes. Commercial (Third) achieved a 100% turnout just within two hours after the Chinese businessmen were urged to demonstrate their full support of the "patriotic" by-election.

The by-election for subsector of Area Committees was the key race which suggests the popularity of the local politicians. The Liberal Party candidate Kenny Yuen was the only partisan member not elected. Amy Cheung was elected as the Architectural, surveying, planning and landscape subsector member after a tie and subsequent lots drawing session.

The public was generally apathetic to the voting criticised as for "the clique inside the clique" despite the government's widespread publication. It costs HKD233 million, which translates to HKD66k per vote.

Subsector	Candidate	Political affiliation	Votes	Elected	Turnout
Commercial (third)	Jacky Kwok Tuen-cheung		64	✓	100%
Commercial (third)	Tony Mak Wing-yin		42		100%
Architectural, surveying, planning and landscape	Amy Cheung Yi-mei		26	✓ (by drawing lots)	96.3%
Architectural, surveying, planning and landscape	Vincent Cheung Kiu-cho		26		96.3%
Technology and innovation	Tu Wenwei		46	✓	100%
Technology and innovation	Lawrence Cheung Chi-chong		44	✓	100%
Technology and innovation	Yang Mengsu		42	✓	100%
Technology and innovation	Wong Kin-hang		40	✓	100%
Technology and innovation	Wendy Lee Woon-ming		37	✓	100%
Technology and innovation	Lam Hon-ming		31		100%
Labour	Lam Tsin-kwok	FTU	506	✓	91.85%
Labour	Jim Fan-chak	FLU	489	✓	91.85%
Labour	Lui Nai-sing		153		91.85%
Representatives of members of Area Committees, District Fight Crime Committees, and District Fire Safety Committees of Hong Kong and Kowloon	Wilson Or Chong-shing	DAB	1,368	✓	99%
Representatives of members of Area Committees, District Fight Crime Committees, and District Fire Safety Committees of Hong Kong and Kowloon	Kwok Kam-fat		1,209	✓	99%
Representatives of members of Area Committees, District Fight Crime Committees, and District Fire Safety Committees of Hong Kong and Kowloon	Sher Ching-yee		1,197	✓	99%
Representatives of members of Area Committees, District Fight Crime Committees, and District Fire Safety Committees of Hong Kong and Kowloon	Lee Wing-man	FLU	1,164	✓	99%
Representatives of members of Area Committees, District Fight Crime Committees, and District Fire Safety Committees of Hong Kong and Kowloon	Wan Chun-man		1,142	✓	99%
Representatives of members of Area Committees, District Fight Crime Committees, and District Fire Safety Committees of Hong Kong and Kowloon	Lai Nuen-san		1,062	✓	99%
Representatives of members of Area Committees, District Fight Crime Committees, and District Fire Safety Committees of Hong Kong and Kowloon	Kenny Yuen Kin-chung	Liberal	782		99%
Representatives of members of Area Committees, District Fight Crime Committees, and District Fire Safety Committees of the New Territories	Wong Po-yee		890	✓	97.99%
Representatives of members of Area Committees, District Fight Crime Committees, and District Fire Safety Committees of the New Territories	Michael Liu Tsz-chung	NPP/CF	887	✓	97.99%
Representatives of members of Area Committees, District Fight Crime Committees, and District Fire Safety Committees of the New Territories	Hau Hon-shek	DAB	877	✓	97.99%
Representatives of members of Area Committees, District Fight Crime Committees, and District Fire Safety Committees of the New Territories	Wong Wai-yue		825	✓	97.99%
Representatives of members of Area Committees, District Fight Crime Committees, and District Fire Safety Committees of the New Territories	Kent Tsang King-chung	FTU	758	✓	97.99%
Representatives of members of Area Committees, District Fight Crime Committees, and District Fire Safety Committees of the New Territories	Lau Chin-pang	FTU	738	✓	97.99%
Representatives of members of Area Committees, District Fight Crime Committees, and District Fire Safety Committees of the New Territories	Wong Chor-kei		734		97.99%
Representatives of members of Area Committees, District Fight Crime Committees, and District Fire Safety Committees of the New Territories	Yip Yik-shing		583		97.99%
Source: https://www.elections.gov.hk/ecss2025by/eng/results.html

=== Uncontested seats ===
Subsector	Candidate	Political affiliation
First Sector
Catering	Yeung Chun-nin	
Commercial (first)	Huang Shaomei	
Commercial (first)	Chan Ho-yin	
Commercial (second)	Alfred Lee Tak-kong	
Employers’ Federation of Hong Kong	Yeung Lui-ming	
Hotel	Mak Yu-fai	
Import and export	Stephen Tang Siu-kun	
Import and export	Chiu Chun-mo	
Industrial (first)	Wong Pok-man	
Industrial (first)	Shum Kin-wai	
Industrial (second)	Vincent Leung Shing-kit	
Real estate and construction	Wong Tin-cheung	
Real estate and construction	Siu Chak-yu	
Small and medium enterprises	Lai Cheuk-pun	
Tourism	Peng Yu	
Transport	Li Tin-chui	
Second Sector
Chinese medicine	Feng Yibin	
Education	Choy Sai-hung	Ed Convergence
Education	Ng Wun-kit	
Legal	Tong Man-lung	
Medical and health services	Henry Chan Hin-lee	
Medical and health services	Jane Chan Chun-kwong	
Medical and health services	Tony Mok Shu-kam	
Sports, performing arts, culture and publication	Yip Pui-chu	
Third Sector
Agriculture and fisheries	Wong Ka-hing	
Associations of Chinese fellow townsmen	Tong Chit	
Associations of Chinese fellow townsmen	Ching Siu-to	
Associations of Chinese fellow townsmen	Matthew Lam Kin-hong	
Associations of Chinese fellow townsmen	Tsoi Chiu-yuk	
Associations of Chinese fellow townsmen	He Yanchen	
Associations of Chinese fellow townsmen	Cheung Kwong-kwan	
Associations of Chinese fellow townsmen	Sun Hei	
Grassroots associations	Tung Kin-lei	DAB
Grassroots associations	Yuet Ngai-keung	DAB
Grassroots associations	Lo Hiu-fung	BPA
Grassroots associations	Anson Lam Ka-fai	BPA
Grassroots associations	Cheung Man-ka	NPP
Grassroots associations	Law Kam-fai	
Grassroots associations	Lam Pok	
Grassroots associations	Fung Mo-kwan	
Fourth Sector
Heung Yee Kuk (Note: One of the candidates (Kwok Wing-cheong) died during nomination period and was hence disqualified.)	Man Luk-sing	
Heung Yee Kuk	Tang Sin-hang	
Heung Yee Kuk	Wan Yeung-kin	
Heung Yee Kuk	Chan Sung-ip	
Heung Yee Kuk	Alfred Lam Kwok-cheong	
Fifth Sector
Representatives of Hong Kong members of relevant national organisations	Muk Ka-chun	DAB
Representatives of Hong Kong members of relevant national organisations	Janet Lee Ching-yee	FTU
Representatives of Hong Kong members of relevant national organisations	Lee Chiu-yu	BPA
Representatives of Hong Kong members of relevant national organisations	Conrad Alwin Ho	
Representatives of Hong Kong members of relevant national organisations	Tsui Ho-yin	
Representatives of Hong Kong members of relevant national organisations	Stephen Chua Yiu-yeung	
Representatives of Hong Kong members of relevant national organisations	Chen Ching-wai	
Representatives of Hong Kong members of relevant national organisations	Shum Ho-cheung	
Representatives of Hong Kong members of relevant national organisations	Yiu Kwai-chu	
Representatives of Hong Kong members of relevant national organisations	Linda Hung Man-yin	
Representatives of Hong Kong members of relevant national organisations	To Nga-nga	
Representatives of Hong Kong members of relevant national organisations	Pang Chi-ping	
Representatives of Hong Kong members of relevant national organisations	Wong Ching-yung	
Representatives of Hong Kong members of relevant national organisations	Bian Zhaoxiang	
Representatives of Hong Kong members of relevant national organisations	Douglas Fang Yan-tak	
Representatives of Hong Kong members of relevant national organisations	Jia Jiaya	
Representatives of Hong Kong members of relevant national organisations	Jing Yin	
Representatives of Hong Kong members of relevant national organisations	Sze Hon-yeung	
Representatives of Hong Kong members of relevant national organisations	Tang Wing-chun	
Representatives of Hong Kong members of relevant national organisations	Eugene Chan Kin-keung	
Representatives of Hong Kong members of relevant national organisations	Angel Lau Chan Siu-po	
Representatives of Hong Kong members of relevant national organisations	Wong Siu-leung	
Representatives of Hong Kong members of relevant national organisations	Wilfred Ng Sau-kei	
Representatives of Hong Kong members of relevant national organisations	Li Zhong	
Representatives of Hong Kong members of relevant national organisations	Felix Chow Bok-hin	
Representatives of Hong Kong members of relevant national organisations	Chong Chong-yip	
Representatives of Hong Kong members of relevant national organisations	Tai Chun-kit	

=== Appointed seats ===
Subsector	Designated Body	Nominee
Second Sector
Accountancy	Association of Hong Kong Accounting Advisors Limited	Poon Kwok-ching
Accountancy	Association of Hong Kong Accounting Advisors Limited	Law Fu-yuen
Accountancy	Association of Hong Kong Accounting Advisors Limited	Richard Tse Kin-pang
Sports, performing arts, culture and publication	Hong Kong Publishing Federation Limited	Hui Chiu-shing
Sports, performing arts, culture and publication	Sports Federation & Olympic Committee of Hong Kong, China	Yang Joe-tsi
Technology and innovation	The Greater Bay Area Association of Academicians	Zhao Tianshou
Third Sector
Religious	Chinese Muslim Cultural and Fraternal Association	Zareenah Ho Sau-yin
Religious	The Hong Kong Taoist Association	Henry Tong Sau-chai and Wong Yum-yin
Religious	Catholic Diocese of Hong Kong	Eddie Chan Chi-kong
Fourth Sector
Representatives of associations of Hong Kong residents in the Mainland	Hong Kong Chamber of Commerce in China—Guangdong	Angelina Law Wai-hing
