= 1998 Hong Kong Election Committee Subsector elections =

1998 Election Committee subsector elections
- 2 April 1998

664 (of the 800) seats in the Election Committee 401 seats needed for a majority
- Turnout: 23.38%
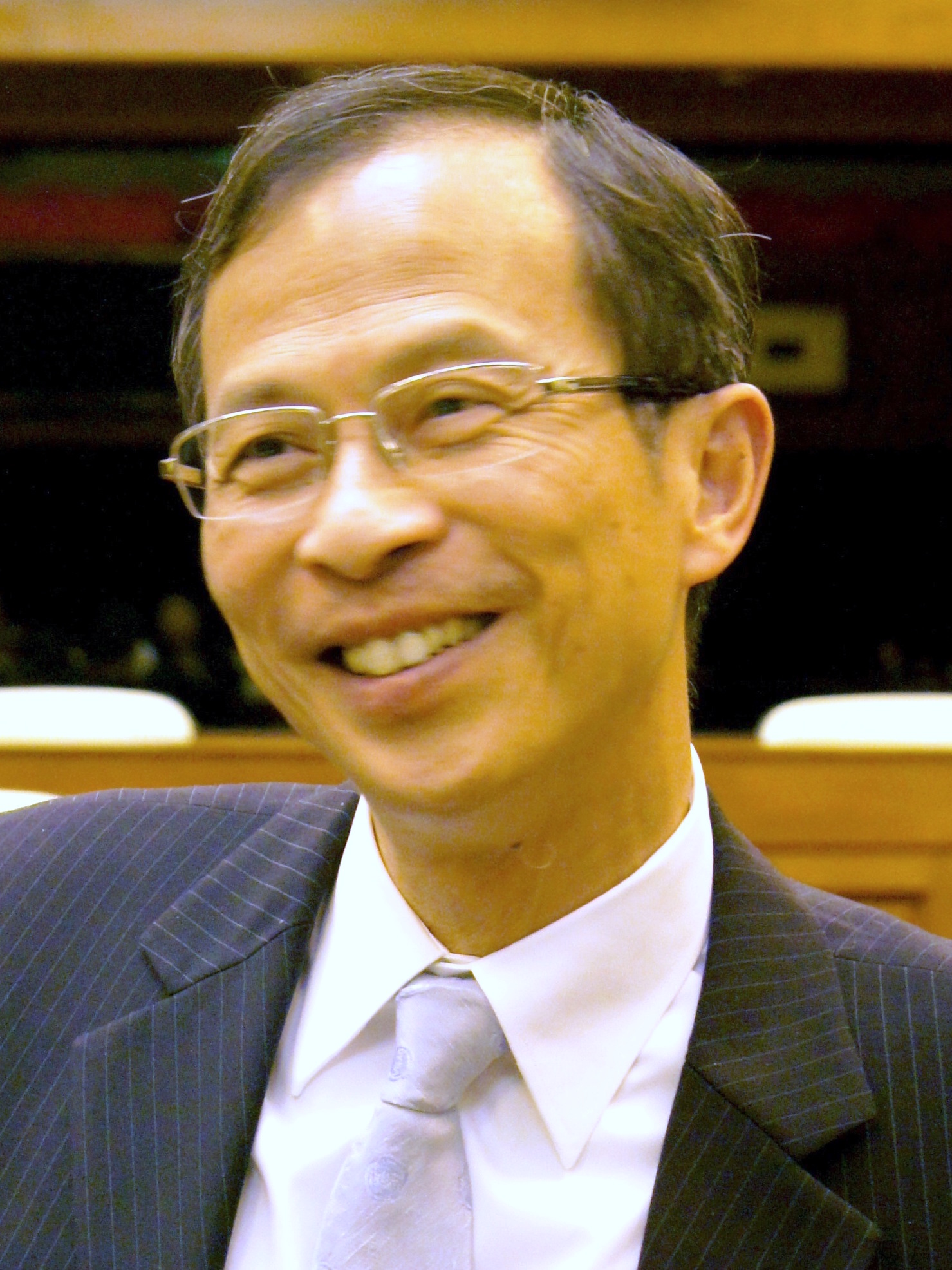

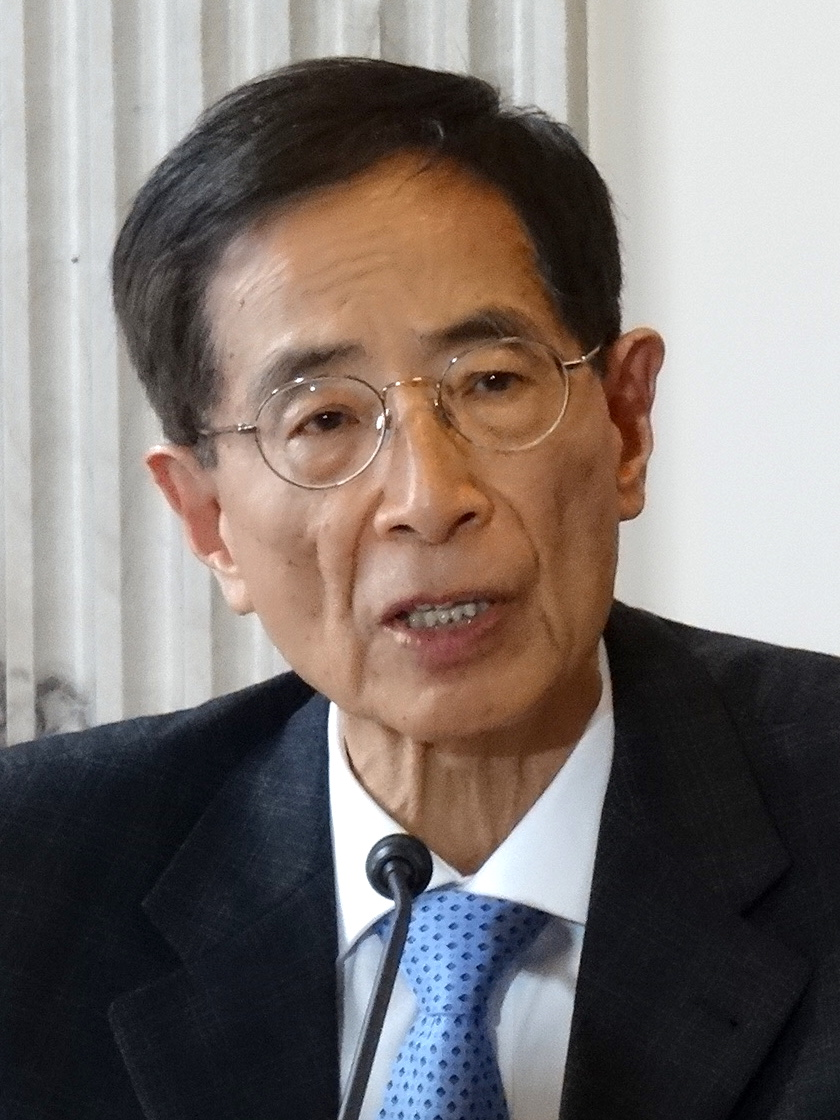

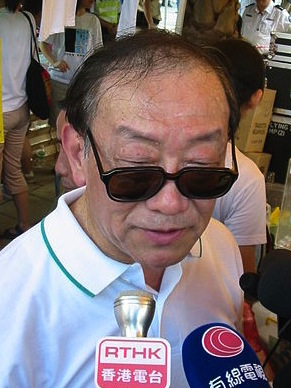
	First party	Second party
		PA
Leader	Tsang Yok-sing	Ambrose Lau
Party	DAB	HKPA
Alliance	Pro-Beijing	Pro-Beijing
Seats won	29	11
	Third party	Fourth party
Leader	Martin Lee	Allen Lee
Party	Democratic	Liberal
Alliance	Pro-democracy	Pro-Beijing
Seats won	8	7

The 1998 Election Committee subsector elections were held on 2 April 1998 to form the Election Committee responsible for electing the Chief Executive of Hong Kong as well as 10 seats of the Election Committee constituency in the first Legislative Council election in May 1998. The 800-member Election Committee was formed, consisting of 77 ex-officio members; 40 members nominated by the Religious Subsector; 95 returned uncontested from four subsectors; and 588 returned from 31 subsectors after the subsector elections.

== Formation of the Election Committee ==
An Election Committee was set up under the Annex I of the Hong Kong Basic Law with four sectors, each comprising 200 members of the Election Committee:

1. industrial, commercial and financial;
2. the professions;
3. labour, social services and religious; and
4. political, including members of the Provisional Legislative Council, Hong Kong deputies to the National People's Congress, representatives of Hong Kong members of the National Committee of the Chinese People's Political Consultative Conference, and representatives of district-based organisations.

The four sectors are subdivided into 38 subsectors. Members from 35 of the subsectors were returned by election and three subsectors do not require election: the National People's Congress subsector and the Provisional Legislative Council subsector since the Hong Kong deputies to the National People's Congress and the members of the Provisional Legislative Council are ex-officio members of the Election Committee, and the Religious subsector's EC members were returned by way of nomination.

=== Subsectors of the Election Committee ===
The 38 Subsectors and the number of the members were:

First Sector:

1. Catering (11)
2. Commercial (first) (12)
3. Commercial (second) (12)
4. Employers’ Federation of Hong Kong (11)
5. Finance (12)
6. Financial services (12)
7. Hong Kong Chinese Enterprises Association (11)
8. Hotel (11)
9. Import and export (12)
10. Industrial (first) (12)
11. Industrial (second) (12)
12. Insurance (12)
13. Real estate and construction (12)
14. Textiles and garment (12)
15. Tourism (12)
16. Transport (12)
17. Wholesale and retail (12)

Second Sector:

1. Accountancy (20)
2. Architectural, surveying and planning (20)
3. Chinese medicine (20)
4. Education (20)
5. Engineering (20)
6. Health services (20)
7. Higher education (20)
8. Information technology (20)
9. Legal (20)
10. Medical (20)

Third Sector:

1. Agriculture and fisheries (40)
2. Labour (40)
3. Religious (40)
4. Social welfare (40)
5. Sports, performing arts, culture and publication (40)

Fourth Sector:

1. National People's Congress (36)
2. Provisional Legislative Council (60)
3. Chinese People's Political Consultative Conference (41)
4. Heung Yee Kuk (21)
5. Hong Kong and Kowloon Provisional District Boards (21)
6. New Territories Provisional District Boards (21)

== Nominations ==
There were total of 1,074 nominations of all the 35 subsectors during the nomination period from 13 March to 20 March 1998 while 1,058 of them validly nominated for the 35 subsectors. The candidates for four of the 35 subsectors were returned uncontested. Since 117 Election Committee members were either ex-officio or nominated by the Religious subsector, and four subsectors returning 95 Election Committee members were uncontested, there were 963 candidates remaining to contesting in 31 subsectors for 588 seats in the EC.

== Results ==
Statistics are generated from the Report on the 1998 Legislative Council Elections.

Sector	Subsector	Registered voters	Candidates	Elected
I	Catering	1,756	20	11
I	Commercial (First)	1,293	18	12
I	Commercial (Second)	1,744	12	12
I	Employers' Federation of Hong Kong	126	14	11
I	Finance	199	15	12
I	Financial Services	531	25	12
I	Hong Kong Chinese Enterprises Association	221	11	11
I	Hotel	81	29	11
I	Import and Export	1,161	14	12
I	Industrial (First)	720	15	12
I	Industrial (Second)	548	12	12
I	Insurance	192	19	12
I	Real Estate and Construction	392	21	12
I	Textiles and Garment	2,737	13	12
I	Tourism	746	17	12
I	Transport	130	31	12
I	Wholesale and Retail	2,204	27	12
I	Sub-total for First Sector	14,781	313	200
II	Accountancy	9,897	39	20
II	Architectural, Surveying and Planning	3,216	36	20
II	Chinese Medicine	2,266	32	20
II	Education	56,702	36	20
II	Engineering	5,350	48	20
II	Health Services	27,480	26	20
II	Higher Education	4,488	27	20
II	Information Technology	3,144	53	20
II	Legal	3,558	33	20
II	Medical	6,784	49	20
II	Sub-total for Second Sector	122,885	379	200
III	Agriculture and Fisheries	165	69	40
III	Labour	409	49	40
III	Religious	N/A	40	40
III	Social Welfare	3,390	49	40
III	Sports, Performing Arts, Culture and Publication (Sports)	1,134	11	10
III	Sports, Performing Arts, Culture and Publication (Performing Arts)	1,134	13	10
III	Sports, Performing Arts, Culture and Publication (Culture)	1,134	24	10
III	Sports, Performing Arts, Culture and Publication (Publication)	1,134	11	10
III	Sub-total for Third Sector	5,098	266	200
IV	National People's Congress	N/A	36	36
IV	Legislative Council	N/A	60	60
IV	Chinese People's Political Consultative Conference	113	41	41
IV	Heung Yee Kuk	105	22	21
IV	Hong Kong and Kowloon District Councils	229	37	21
IV	New Territories District Councils	206	23	21
IV	Sub-total for Fourth Sector	671	219	200
	TOTAL	143,435	1,177	800
