= 2002 Hong Kong Chief Executive election =

- 28 February 2002

All 800 votes of the Election Committee 401 votes needed to win
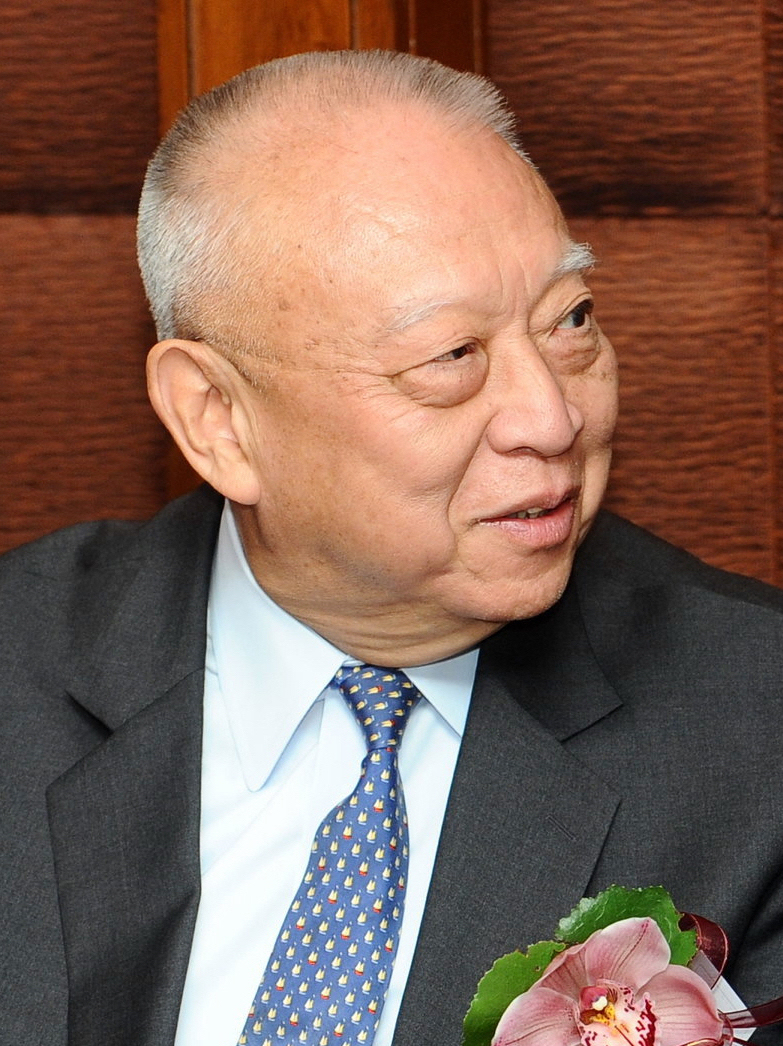
Nominee	Tung Chee-hwa
Party	Nonpartisan
Alliance	Pro-Beijing
Electoral vote	Uncontested
Chief Executive before election
Tung Chee-hwa
Nonpartisan
Elected Chief Executive
Tung Chee-hwa
Nonpartisan

The 2002 Hong Kong Chief Executive election was to select the second term of the Chief Executive (CE) of the Hong Kong Special Administrative Region (HKSAR). Incumbent Tung Chee-hwa was nominated by the 800-member Election Committee (EC) without competition.

== Background ==
The Election Committee (EC) was responsible for electing the Chief Executive (CE). Before the Chief Executive election, a by-election was held on 6 January 2002 to fill the four vacancies in the Election Committee.

Incumbent Chief Executive Tung Chee-hwa was supported by Chinese leaders for his re-election as early as 2001. Speaking in Myanmar in December 2001, Chinese paramount leader Jiang Zemin stated, "I wish that Mr. Tung will get elected. I am convinced he will get elected." Given the support and certainty of Tung's re-election, many observers argued that not only would it have been futile to oppose Tung or to support another candidate potentially harmful to their business interests in Hong Kong and mainland China. Jiang was previously asked by Sharon Cheung, a Hong Kong journalist, in October 2001 whether Beijing has appointed Tung as the next Chief Executive, which Jiang replied by condemning Cheung "too simple, sometimes naïve".

Tung started his campaign in 2001 by setting up an office in the Central District and constructing a website to release news of his campaign. His campaign manager like Leung Chun-ying, the Convenor of the Unofficial Members of the Executive Council tried to project a more communicative and high-tech image of Tung.

== Nomination ==
The nomination period lasted for two weeks from 15 to 28 February 2002. On 19 February, only four days after the nomination period opened the Asian Wall Street Journal first reported Tung's de facto victory, as more than 695 Election Committee members had nominated him for a second term, which made it mathematically impossible for anyone else to nominated as the threshold of required for nomination was 100 members. At the end of the nomination period, Tung garnered 712 nominations from the Election Committee and thus was the only validly nominated candidate with the boycott of the pro-democracy camp.

The pro-democracy camp argued that the electoral process was deliberately designed to obstruct any challenge to Tung. Although there were voices that pro-democrats might have made it possible to nominate an alternative candidate, legislator and The Frontier chairperson Emily Lau was against supporting an alternative candidate: "As it is not a fair, open and democratic election, we should not participate in it and give it any legitimacy." Lau formed the Coalition Against Second Term (CAST) to draw attention to the flawed process of choosing the Chief Executive, the lack of competition and the need for real democracy.

Candidate	Born	Party	Most recent position	Campaign	Nominations received
Tung Chee-hwa 董建華	7 July 1937 (age 64)	Nonpartisan (Pro-Beijing)	Chief Executive of Hong Kong (1997–)	Announced: 13 December 2001; Nominated: 19 February 2002	714 / 800 (89%)

== Result ==
While the election date was originally set on 24 March 2002, Tung was declared re-elected on 28 February 2002, and thus the election was concluded. Tung was also considered as the only Chief Executive hand-picked in high-profile by the Chinese Government, until the 2022 election.

2002 Hong Kong Chief Executive election
Party	Candidate	Votes	%	±%
Nonpartisan	Tung Chee-hwa	Uncontested		
Registered electors		800		

== Aftermath ==
In his second term, Tung Chee-hwa increasingly faced difficult challenge of governing without a democratic mandate. With the SARS epidemics and the controversies over the Hong Kong Basic Law Article 23 in 2003 drew a massive anti-government protest on 1 July 2003. As Jiang Zemin retired from as General Secretary of the Chinese Communist Party (de facto leader), Tung gradually lost his main patron in Beijing and eventually stepped down in 2005.
