= Fung Wai-wah =

Hong Kong educator, social worker and activist

- 馮偉華
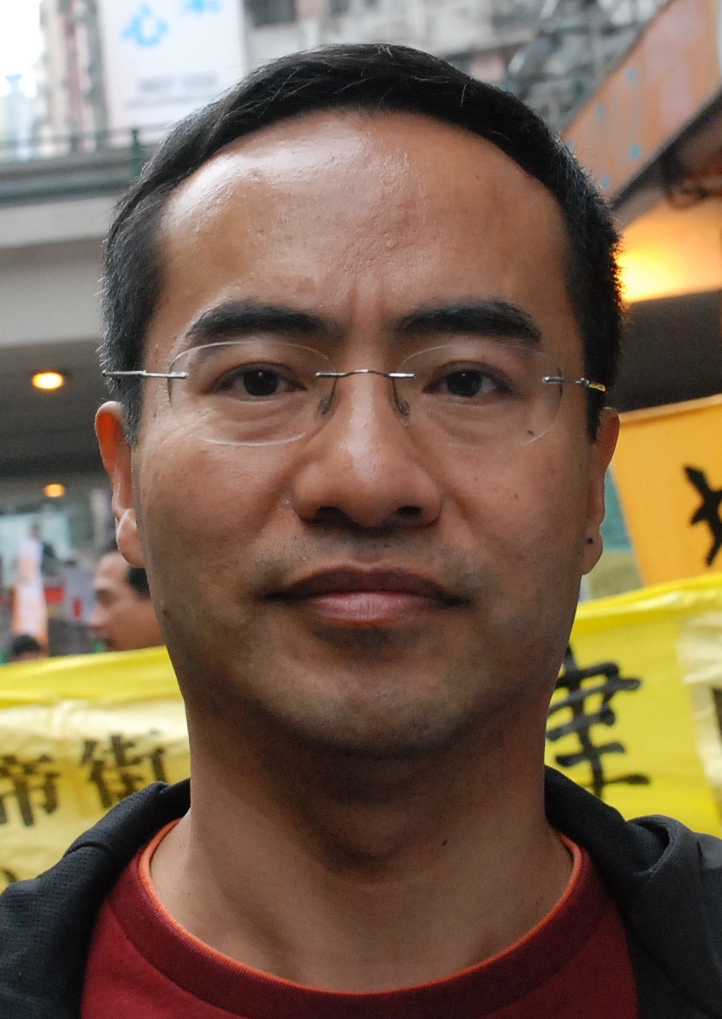

President of the Hong Kong Professional Teachers' Union
- In office 23 May 2010 – 11 September 2021
- Preceded by: Cheung Man-kwong
- Succeeded by: None (PTU disbanded)

Personal details
- Born: 1960 (age 65–66) Hong Kong
- Party: Meeting Point (1980s–94)
- Other political affiliations: Hong Kong Professional Teachers' Union
- Occupation: Senior Lecturer

Fung Wai-wah
- Traditional Chinese: 馮偉華
Transcriptions
Yue: Cantonese
- Yale Romanization: Fùhng Wáih wàh
- Jyutping: Fung^{4} Wai^{5} waa^{4}

Fung Wai-wah (Chinese: 馮偉華; born 1960) is a Hong Kong educator, social worker and activist. He is the final president of the Hong Kong Professional Teachers' Union (HKPTU), the largest teachers' union in the territory which disbanded in August 2021, and the former convenor of the Alliance for Universal Suffrage, a pro-democracy coalition on the issue of the 2017 and 2020 universal suffrage.

== Social work and teaching career ==
Fung served as a social worker in the youth and community development service of Caritas Hong Kong before he began to teach social workers. He taught at the City University of Hong Kong (CityU) since 1989 and became Senior Lecturer at the School of Continuing and Professional Education.

He has been member of the staff association of the CityU. In 2003, he formed a group called "Save the College Action Group of CityU" to protest against the university's decision to fire all the teaching staff and employees of the sub-degree programmes, as a result of the government's decision to cut funding to the sub-degree programmes. It lodged a complaint to the Panel on Education of the Legislative Council and successfully switched the operation mode of sub-degree programs from a subsidized basis to a self-financing basis.

He has served as an elected member of the CityU Council since 2006. In 2008, Fung protested to CityU Council chairman Leung Chun-ying over the reduction of the salaries of the Community College staff with other staff association members. Despite Leung's promise to compensate the staff, Leung refused to compensate when the college recorded financial surplus in the following years.

== PTU member and president ==
He joined the Hong Kong Professional Teachers' Union (HKPTU), the largest teachers' union in the territory, in 1989 and was invited by president Cheung Man-kwong to sit on the PTU executive committee after the success of the "Save the College Action Group of CityU" action group. In 2010, Fung succeeded Cheung to become the third president of the PTU.

In 2010, Fung was elected as the convenor of the Alliance for Universal Suffrage, a coalition consisting of eleven pro-democracy parties on the issue of the government's reform package on the 2012 elections of the Chief Executive and the Legislative Council to be the balanced force in the midst of the increasing differences and conflicts on the approaches on striving for universal suffrage between the moderate faction led by the Democratic Party and the radical faction League of Social Democrats (LSD).

The Alliance was considered as "moderate" and did not support the "Five Constituencies Referendum" launched by Civic Party and LSD. Fung later endorsed the Democrats' revised constitutional reform package and therefore was heavily criticised by the LSD chairman Wong Yuk-man. In 2013, Fung announced the Alliance "will be indefinitely suspended" in order to form a new body with other pan-democrats on the matter of full universal suffrage.

Fung initially intended to run in the 2012 Legislative Council election in the Education functional constituency after incumbent Cheung Man-kwong announced his retirement from the seat and candidacy in Kowloon West geographical constituency, but later withdraw his candidacy citing his health problem. The seat was taken up by another PTU executive committee member Ip Kin-yuen as a result.

Fung has been a member of the Election Committee which elects the Chief Executive since 2006. In 2015, he was appointed member of the Education Commission.

On 10 August 2021, as the PTU announced its decision to disband following calls by Chinese state media and accusations by a Hong Kong government spokesperson that the union was "dragging schools into politics," Fung said that the union had felt "enormous pressure" when making the decision.

Educational offices
Preceded by Cheung Man-kwong	President of Hong Kong Professional Teachers' Union; 2010–2021	Service disbanded
