= Timeline of the 2019–2020 Hong Kong protests (January 2020) =

January events of the 2019–2020 pro-democracy demonstrations in Hong Kong

Timeline of the 2019–2020 Hong Kong protests
2019			March–June				July	August	September	October	November	December
2020	January	February	March	April	May	June	July	August	September	October	November	December
2021	January	February	March	April	May	June	July	August	September–November			December

This is a list of protests in January 2020 that were part of the 2019–2020 Hong Kong protests. The protests continued to be buoyed up by the success of the pan-democrats at the November 2019 District Council Elections, but also continued to feel the effects of the mass arrests at the November 2019 siege of the Hong Kong Polytechnic University. With the notable exceptions of protests on New Year's Day and on 19 January, protests remained smaller-scale but took place almost every day. It appeared that police, under its new chief Chris Tang, had changed its tactics to round up violent protesters early, aiming to avoid the spiralling into evening violence that had occurred in many of the earlier protests.

Towards the end of the month, as the first cases of what would develop into the COVID-19 pandemic were detected in the city, protests began to turn towards the perceived shortcomings in the handling of the outbreak by the Hong Kong government.

== Events ==
=== 1 January: New Year's Day ===
In the evening hours of New Year's Eve, Hong Kong police fired tear gas in Mong Kok, as they continued to try and clear the streets of protesters who had set fires to roadblocks on Nathan Road. Armoured vehicles were seen clearing roadblocks set up by protesters using a variety of objects. The crowd also chanted "Liberate Hong Kong, revolution of our times" during the last few seconds of 2019.

The march on New Year's Day, named "Stand shoulder to shoulder", was aimed at pressuring Carrie Lam and the government to accept protesters' five core demands. Further demands of the police-approved protest included calls for increased union representation, for police to take responsibility for misconduct such as arresting medical staff at protests, and for the Hong Kong government not to increase the salaries of police who had been involved in such misconduct. Thousands gathered filling up the lawn of Victoria Park, from where the organisers started the march 20 minutes ahead of the planned 3:00 pm start. As people marched out of Victoria Park, more people were waiting to get in. Secondary school students, families with children, and elderly people had turned up to join the march. The marchers called chants commonly heard throughout the protests, such as "Five demands, not one less" and "Liberate Hong Kong, revolution of our times".

The Civil Human Rights Front said the police asked them to end the march after clashes broke out in Wan Chai. Officers soon began firing tear gas and pepper spray there. The front said it immediately complied and asked people to leave. It said they received notice from police at 5:30 pm, asking to end the rally by 6:15 pm. Some radical masked protesters did not heed this call and went on to vandalize more than five HSBC branches, setting one of the bronze lions outside the bank's headquarters on fire; the bank had drawn the ire of protesters and their supporters when it closed an account by the supporting organization Spark Alliance in December 2019. Other businesses with mainland Chinese connections were also vandalized. Police charged quickly into action, rounding up more than 460 protesters near the Sogo department store; some observers saw this as a sign of a change of tactics under the new Police chief, Chris Tang, who had assumed his position on 19 November.

Organisers claim over one million participated in the protest. Police said 60,000 people attended the march at its peak.

The CHRF said the police decision to end the march showed that the government is unwilling to listen to the voices of the people and is infringing on the right of assembly of Hong Kong residents. They warned that peace will not return to Hong Kong if police continue to adopt such methods.

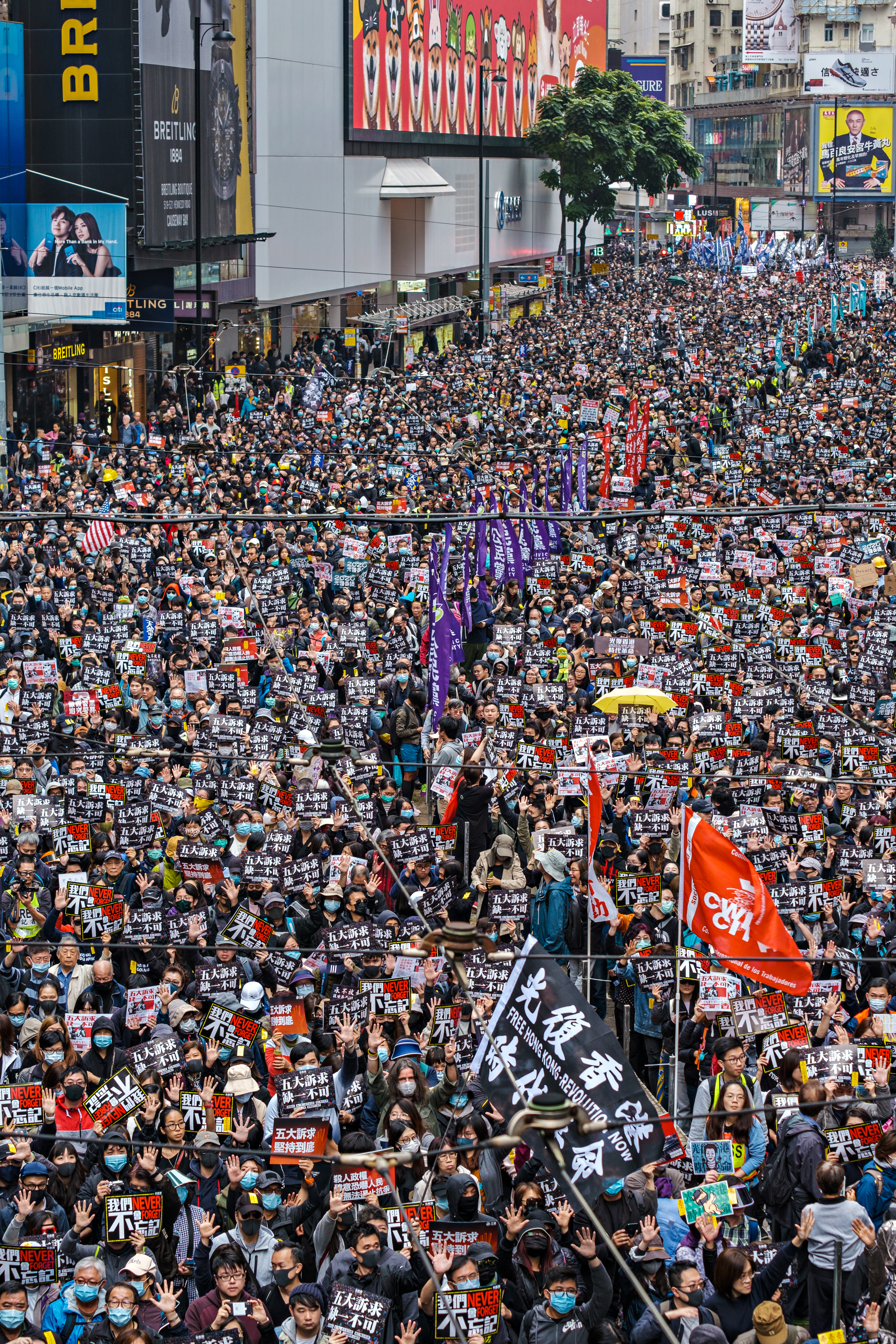
Protesters flooding the streets

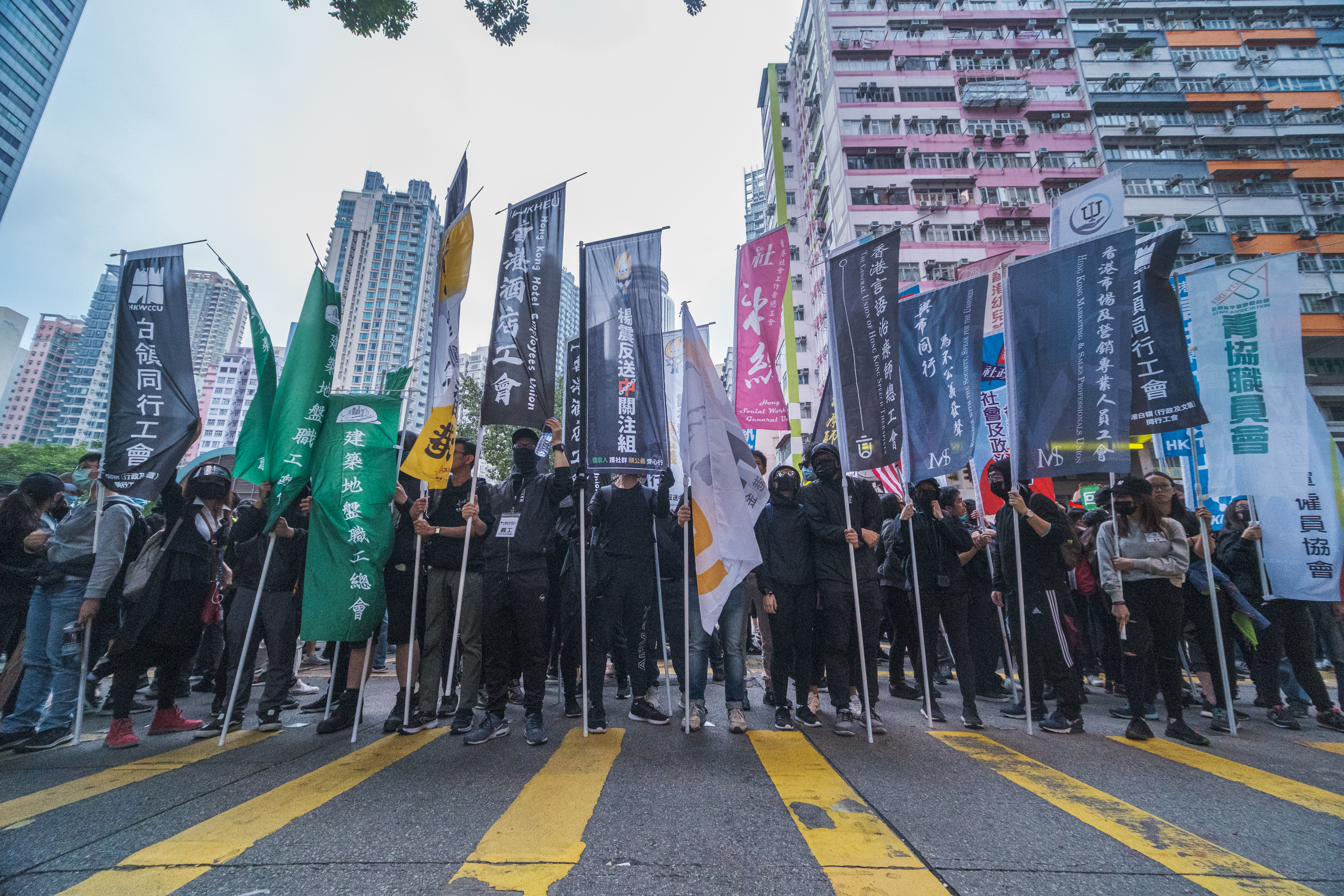
Protesters holding banners

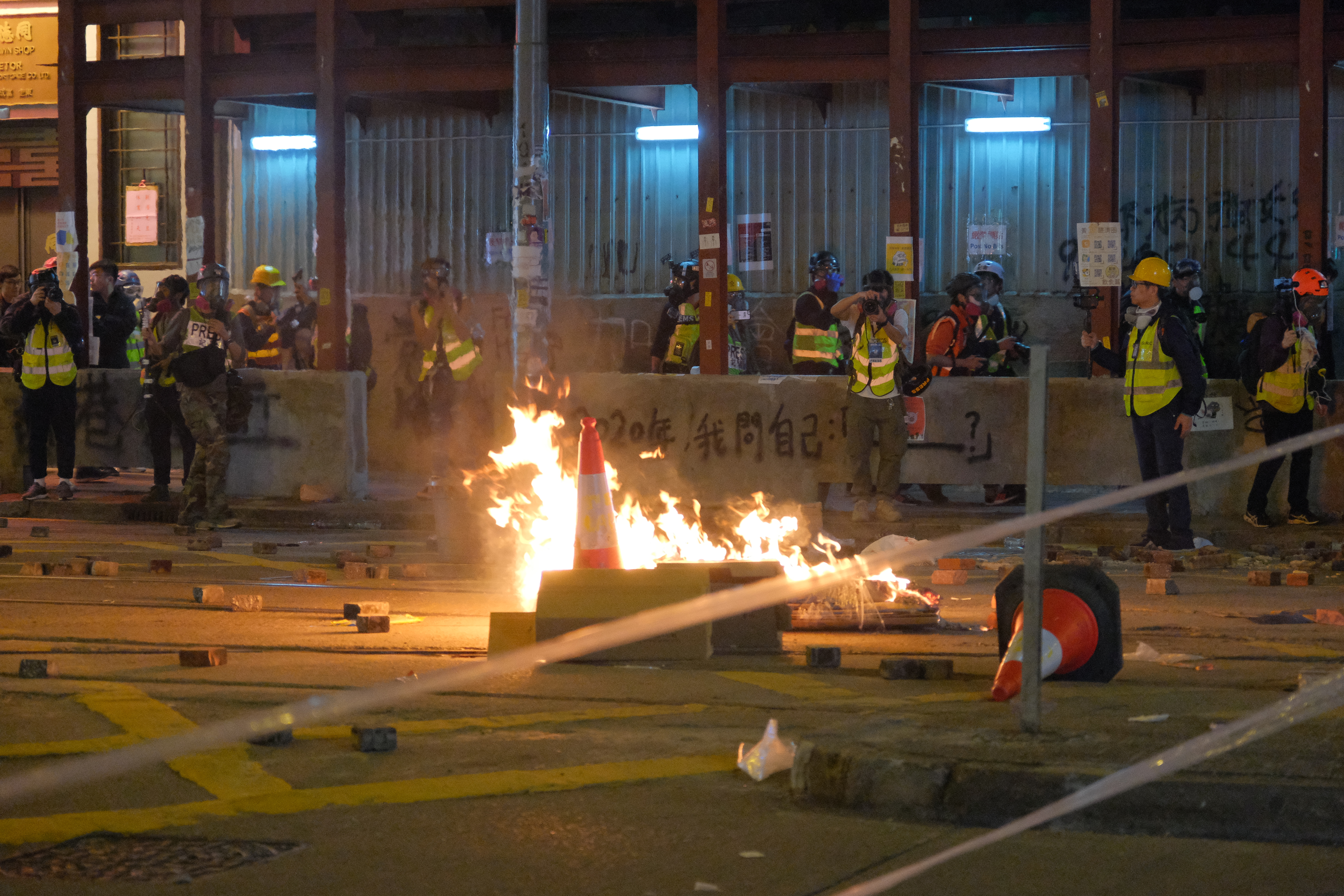
A makeshift roadblock set on fire

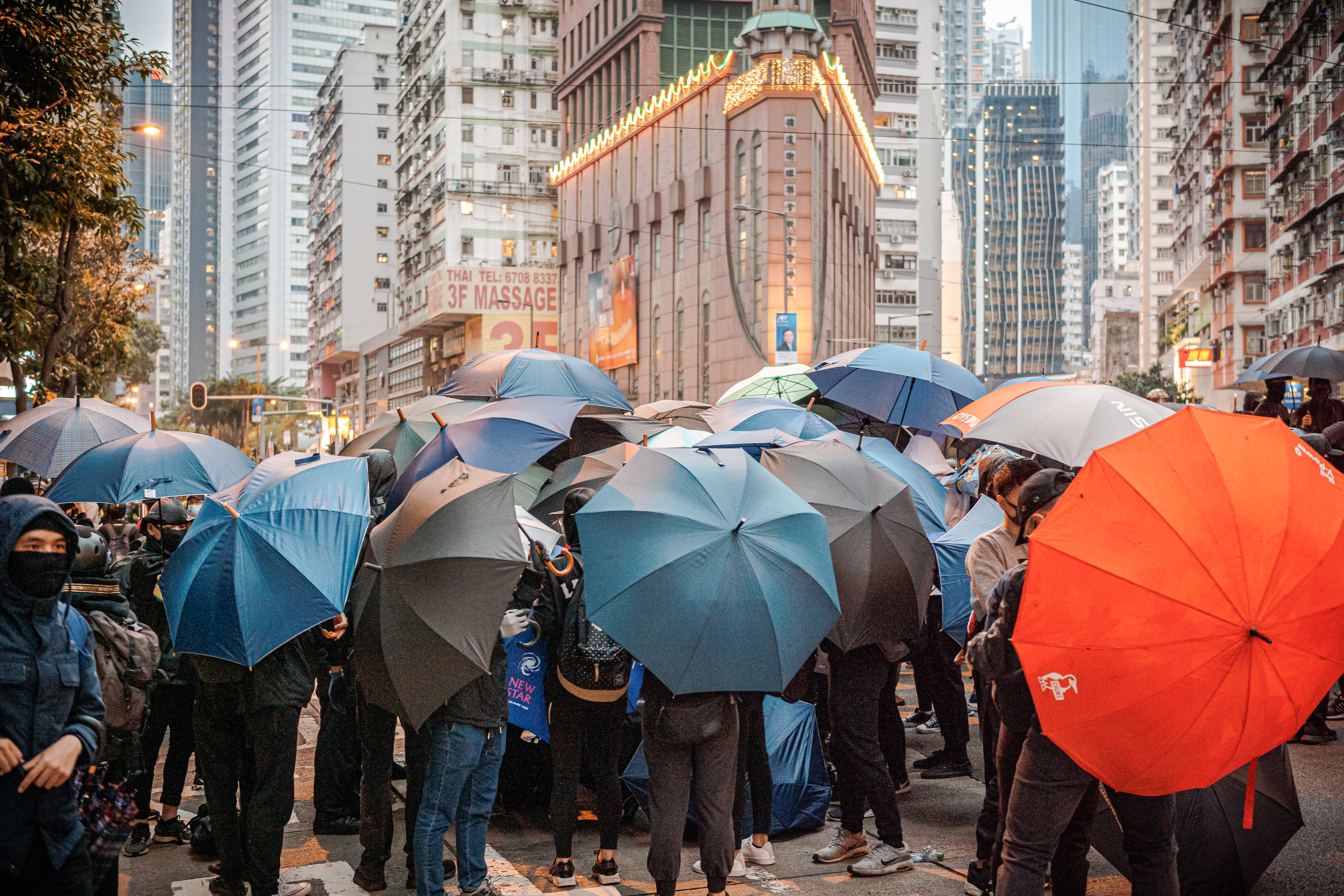
Protesters holding umbrellas

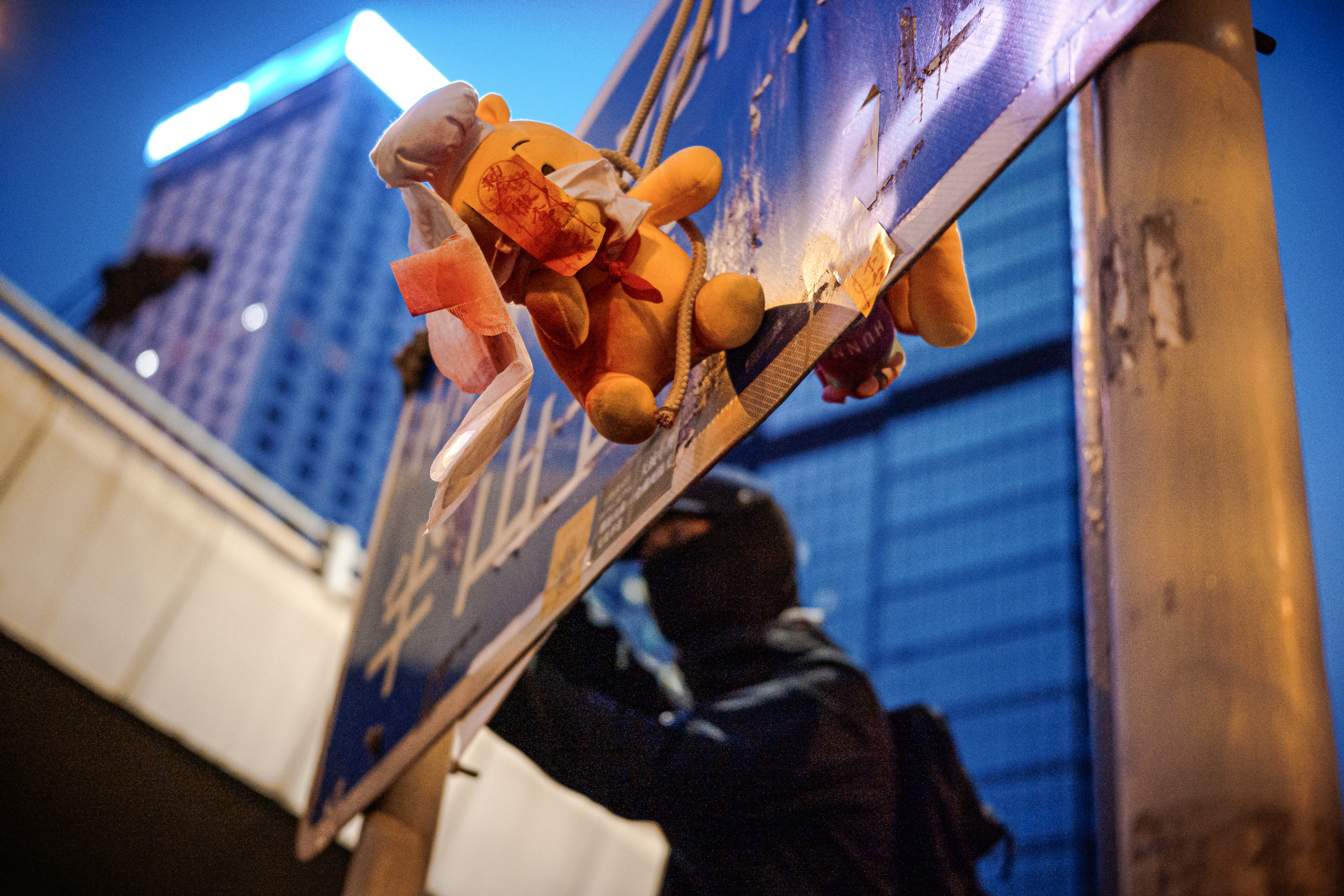
A Winnie the Pooh toy used to symbolise Xi Jinping

=== 2 January ===
Some protesters called a "Lunch with You" rally. At about 1 pm, about 100 citizens gathered in and around Statue Square in Central. Participants chanted slogans in the square, other held signs to protest police use of allegedly excessive force. At about 1:45, the crowd walked towards Pedder Street. The crowd then shouted "See you tomorrow" and disbanded. More than ten riot police officers remained on alert in Pedder Street afterwards.

=== 3 January ===
Thousands of teachers and other protesters gathered at Edinburgh Place at night to voice their opposition at what they called "white terror" from the government. Organised by the Professional Teachers' Union (PTU) the rally came after education secretary Kevin Yeung said the PTU was misinformed and called on teachers not to be misled by them. Fung Wai-wah, the leader of the union, said "the government is making teachers scapegoats for the current social unrest".

Organisers said 20,000 people turned up at the peak of the rally.

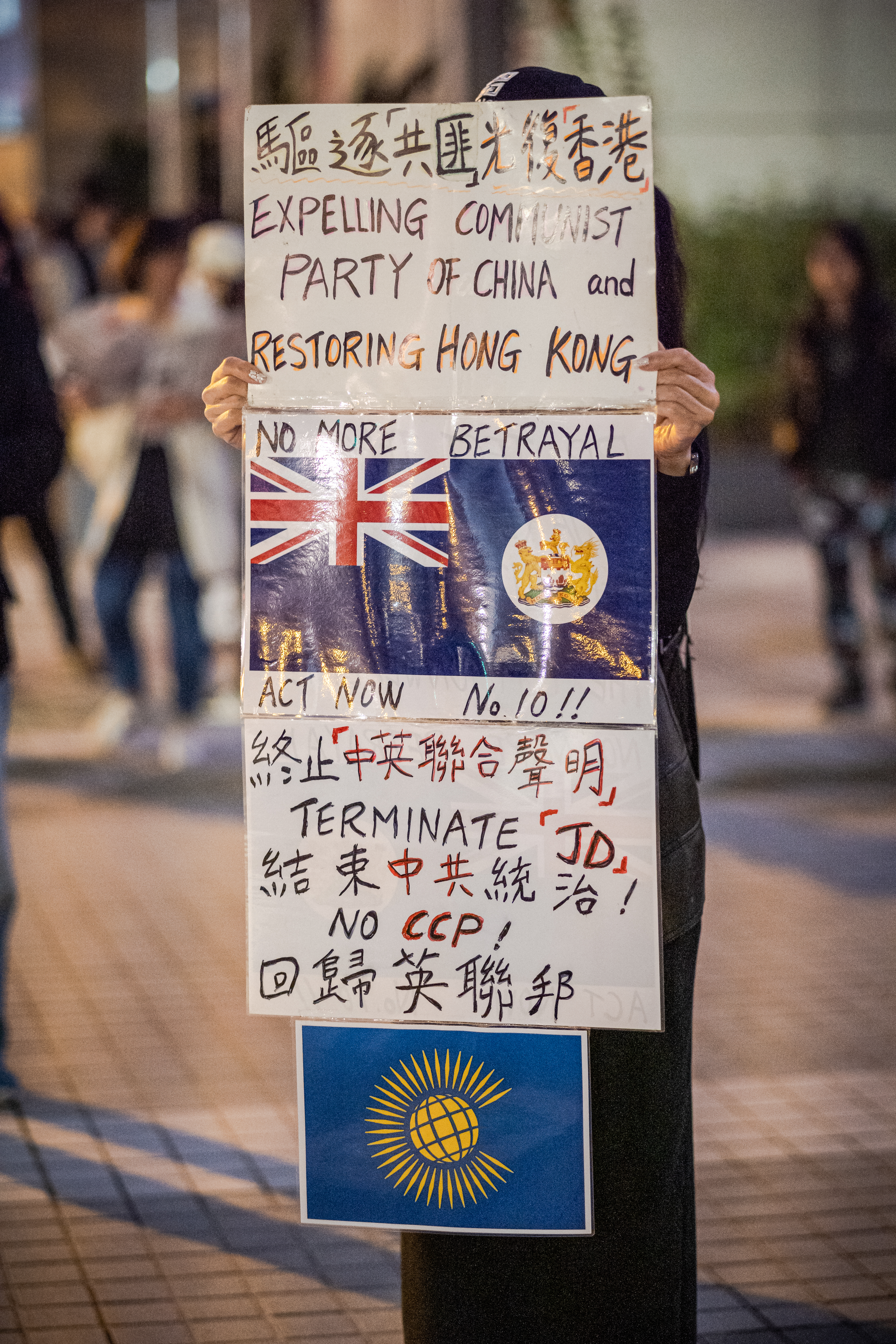
A protester calling for Hong Kong independence from China

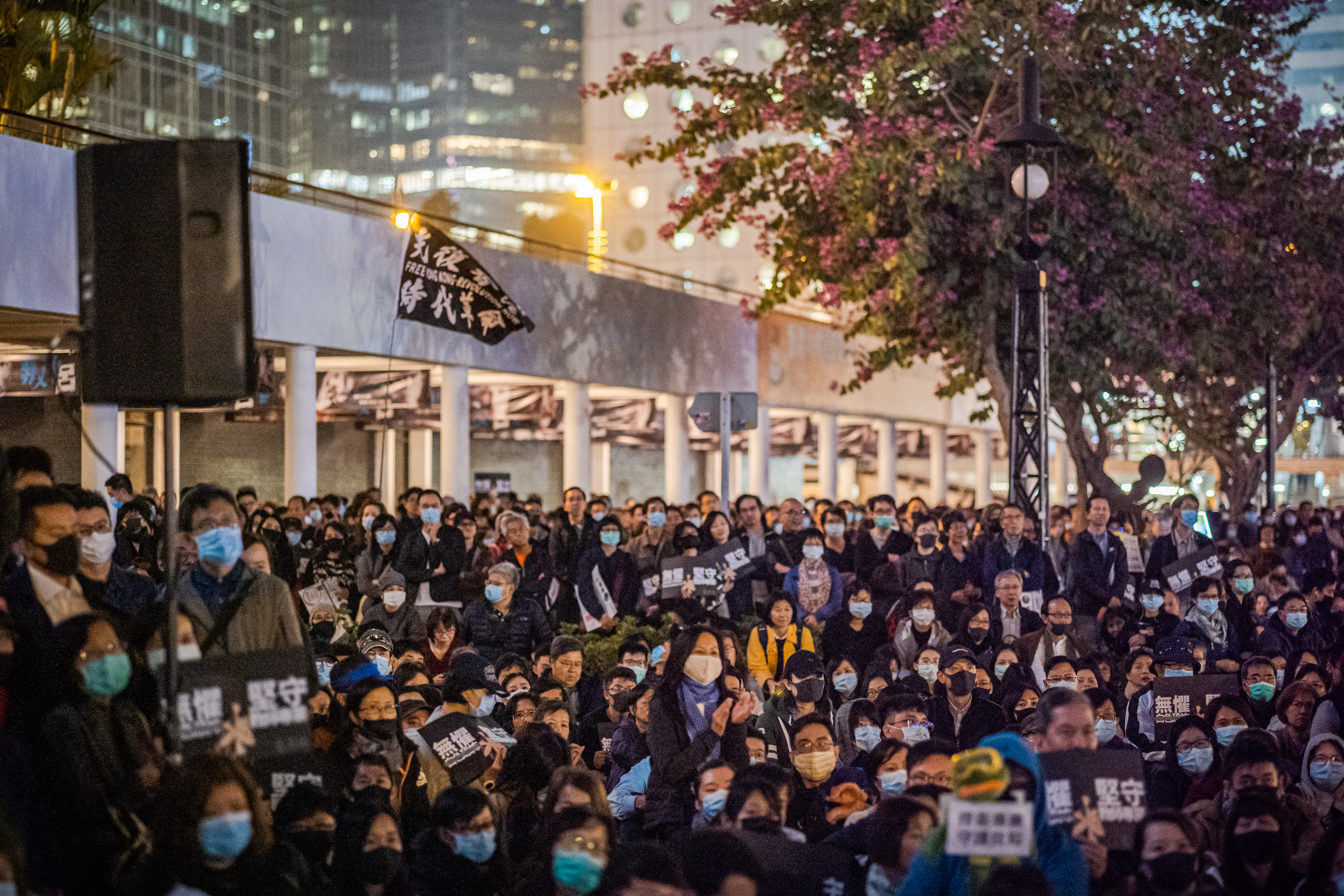
Protesters holding banners

=== 5 January ===
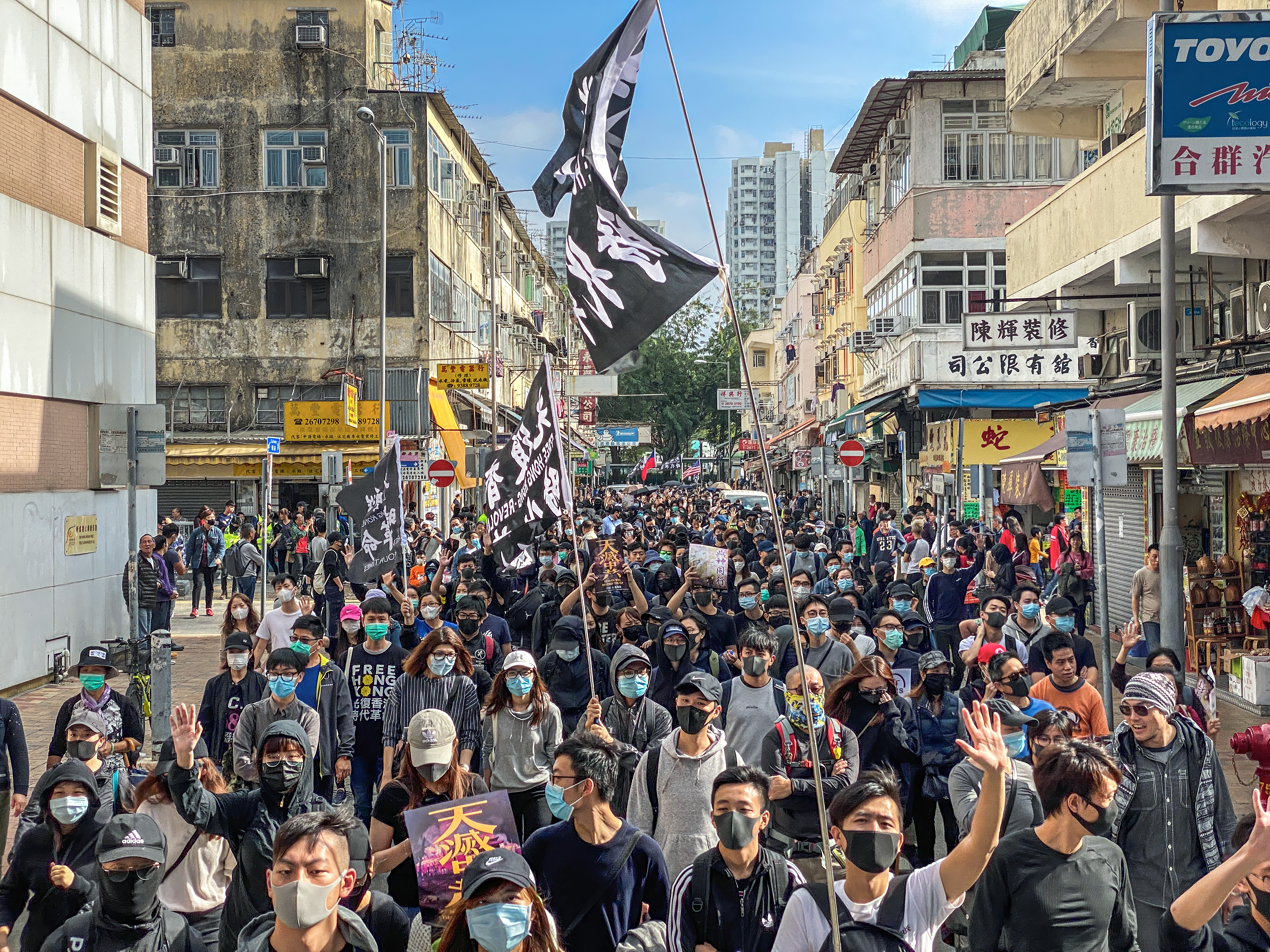
Protesters marching through the streets

Several hundred people began marching through Sheung Shui accusing the government and police of failing to take action against parallel trading in the district. The organiser said there would be about 100 marshals to maintain law and order also stating that it was unnecessary as the authorised event will be peaceful. A stand-off then developed after the police told protesters to disperse as soon as they reached the endpoint. Police warned that they could be arrested for holding an illegal assembly. Organisers claimed a turnout of 10,000 people. Police said the crowd numbered 2,500 at its peak.

=== 6 January ===
Some citizens continued to launch "Lunch with You" rallies in multiple districts. Among them, in Wan Chai and Causeway Bay, demonstrators walked along Hennessy Road and Johnston Road, and some people raised banners and shouted slogans common to the protests.

=== 7 January ===
==== Lunch with You, Sing with You rallies ====
Some citizens launched "Sing with you" and "Lunch with you" rallies. Protesters in Kowloon Bay and at the International Finance Centre responded to the call for action. The demonstration proceeded peacefully without any conflict between the police and the demonstrators.

==== Sha Tin District Council ====
In the evening, in the New Town Plaza in Sha Tin held a "Plan with You" civil district council event. More than ten district councillors served as guests and hundreds of citizens attended. During the period, Shatin District Council Chairman Ching Cheung-ying and vice-chairman Wong Hok-lai made speeches, explaining the district council appropriations, including various expenditure sections including "development, housing and business", "finance, standing and other large-scale activities", "district facility management", etc. It also talked about "police riots", the establishment of Lennon Walls, market management, and regional facilities, as well as the organisation of civil society. At the end of the event, the citizens shouted anti-government slogans, and then slowly dispersed.

=== 8 January ===
About 100 people gathered at a car park in Tseung Kwan O to pay tribute to Alex Chow Tsz-Lok, a student who had died two months earlier, to the day, of injuries from a fall in that car park while a police clearance operation had been conducted against a protest in the vicinity. They observed a minute's silence in memory of him. The mourners lit candles and placed flowers near the car park wall. Others displayed posters about the protests. Some masked protesters attempted to block a major intersection in the area. They pulled old cabinets and a sofa from a rubbish collection point nearby and tried to put them outside the PopCorn mall. Police sirens were heard, causing the protesters to flee back to the car park. The protesters later dug up bricks near the car park and scattered them on a nearby road. They also fled as soon as riot police arrived.

Police were deployed to a "Lennon Wall" in Tsuen Wan overnight, as tensions flared between residents of the area and a group of people who had arrived to tear down protest-related posts and messages. They were carrying rods, high-power water cleaning guns and wall scrapers. Some residents who came out to confront them were chased off by the outsiders who were wielding the tools they had brought with them. Police arrived at around half past midnight to separate the two sides and those who had planned to rip down the Lennon Wall left the area.

=== 9 January ===
==== Write with You rally ====
Some citizens called for a "Write to You and Warm to Taiwan" rally at 1 pm in Kowloon Bay. At the peak, about 30 citizens were present to write letters to be transferred to the Taiwan solidarity protesters. The scene was generally calm, no slogans were heard. Most of the participants left on their own after writing a letter. During the event, riot police were stationed.

==== ICAC investigation ====
About 60 people, in Quarry Bay Station gathered outside to chant slogans. Others marched to the Independent Commission Against Corruption (ICAC) headquarters. The marchers were dissatisfied with Legislative Councillor Lam Cheuk-ting, who earlier disclosed to the media that the superintendent responsible for a fight was being investigated by the ICAC. According to Article 30 (1) of the Prevention of Bribery Ordinance, it is an offence to disclose the identity of the person being investigated to the public, or any specific person, without lawful authority and reasonable excuse.

=== 10 January ===
Dozens of people protested chanting anti-government slogans and some protesters stomped on pictures of Chinese Communist Party general secretary Xi Jinping, Chief Executive Carrie Lam and Police commissioner Chris Tang. Later police officers were seen scraping the pictures off the floor. Around 20 riot police officers were present but the protest ended without any confrontations. Some displayed placards calling for an independent probe into alleged police brutality and to disband the force immediately. When the riot police walked past, some insults were also hurled at them.

=== 11 January ===
==== Citywide Lennon Day ====
Some citizens launched the "Lennon Day" in multiple districts. The event was convened at 2 pm, and the "Yuen Tso Celebration" was held near the Central Government Complex where the Lennon Wall first appeared in Hong Kong. Police where deployed in multiple areas. More than a dozen demonstrators went to make Lennon Walls, in participation with the "Lennon, Warrior Thanksgiving Ceremony" event, outside the Admiralty Government headquarters, followed by a tram to Causeway Bay, and finally glass of a footbridge on Percival Street. Protesters put stickers and posters on the boards.

==== Riot police suspected of law enforcement within the British consulate ====
At about 5:30 pm, around 20 young people responded to the "Lennon Day" event, and posted the anti-government posters outside the British Consulate General. Suddenly, two or three police officers stopped vehicles approaching, claiming that someone had been hurt at the scene. At least one girl was arrested. People at the scene said that the gray steps where they were located on was part of British territory. Saying that the police could not enforce the law on the step. Later, the British Conservative Party member of the Commission on Human Rights Luke de Pulford on Twitter issued a document, expressed concern about the peaceful expression of the demands of young protesters, suspected to be arrested within the scope of the consulate that requires immediate attention. Later, in a response to an inquiry by Hong Kong Free Press, the British Ministry of Foreign Affairs and Commonwealth acknowledged that the British Consulate General in Hong Kong had proactively called the police.

=== 12 January ===
Hundreds of people staged a rally in Central calling on the international community to sanction the Hong Kong government, which they accuse of violating the basic human rights of residents. A number of protesters waved the flags of the United States, Japan, and the United Kingdom, with some saying the U.S. flag represents freedom and justice. One of the organisers of the rally, Ventus Lau, said he hopes overseas governments can follow in the footsteps of the U.S. in passing the Hong Kong Human Rights and Democracy Act to sanction Hong Kong government officials if authorities continue to ignore the five demands of the protesters. Lau also said "the Hong Kong government is capable of introducing full democracy right away by abolishing the functional constituencies in the Legco elections this year". If it doesn't, he says the sanctions will be triggered and officials will face the strongest retribution.

=== 14 January ===
Protesters called a "Lunch with You" rally. By 1:00 pm, more than a dozen citizens gathered in the atrium of "The Landmark", in Central. Protesters included young students, holding posters and shouting slogans. Some of the participants turned on their mobile phone flashlights and sang. Later, more protesters gradually joined. Police officers were stationed nearby.

=== 15 January ===
Around 100 people held a rally at the Edinburgh Place, Central, to protest against the University of Hong Kong's (HKU) move to start proceedings against Occupy Central co-founder Benny Tai that could see him fired. The law professor was released on bail pending appeal over his convictions of leading the pro-democracy movement in 2014. He was jailed in April 2019 for 16 months. Members of the rally many of them HKU graduates said "the university should not have set up the inquiry as it violates due process as Tai's appeal is before the courts".

=== 16 January ===
Citizens launched a "Lunch with You" rally. Demonstrators shouted slogans in the Tsun Yip Street Playground in Kwun Tong. After about 100 protesters gathered, the crowd started to move towards How Ming Street and shouted slogans along the way. In addition, in Statue Square in Central, some citizens also launched a "Lunch with You/Write with You" campaign. Dozens of people came and wrote slogans on scrolls. Some police officers were stationed at the entrance.

=== 17 January ===
==== Lunch with You rallies ====
Protesters called to "Lunch with You" rallies in Cheung Sha Wan and San Po Kong. About 30 people gathered in the parking lot of the Hong Kong Industrial Centre. The crowds along the way shouted slogans. Some riot police officers were deployed along the way and went outside the Lai Chi Kok Reception Centre, a prison where arrested protesters are held. About 70 demonstrators shouted "Release the righteous". In San Po Kong, Tai Yau Street, there were also about 50 citizens gathered, including a number of students in school uniforms. They later walked to Sheung Hei Street to disperse. Police officers were on alert but the rally was relatively calm.

==== Tai Po secondary school students' rally ====
The Tai Po Secondary School Student Speech Platform, comprising secondary school students from Tai Po, held a rally in the open-air plaza at the Tai Po Waterfront Park. More than 100 citizens participated. Organisers also invited many members of the Tai Po District Council. Next to the rally, a "Write with You" event was also held to allow the attendees to write a New Year greeting for Hong Kong people in exile in Taiwan.

=== 18 January ===
Hong Kong citizens woke up to see their first hill-top vertical protest banner of 2020 on Beacon Hill. This black-with-white-font banner was about 25 meters long, and the Chinese characters on the banner showed "Hong Kongers Add Oil; Resist and Avenge" (「香港人加油反抗復仇」).

=== 19 January ===
A rally calling for electoral reform and a boycott of the Chinese Communist Party was held at Chater Gardens in Central district. The organisers, among them Ventus Lau, had sought to obtain a letter of no objection for a march, but the police only permitted a static rally. Solidarity rallies in 22 cities across 12 countries were announced for the same day.

The assembly began at 3 pm. At about 4 pm, demonstrators surrounded police officers and threw water bottles and debris in Des Voeux Road, in Central. Some protesters also set up barricades with iron bars, bricks, traffic cones, and umbrellas. Police said two community liaison officers were attacked with wooden sticks and sustained head injuries. At about 4.30 pm, the police demanded the termination of the rally for security reasons.

Three police officers and a civilian relations team entered the venue to communicate with the organiser to request the termination of the rally. The police fired tear gas outside Chater Garden to disperse the rally.

A reporter from Stand News was intercepted twice by police during an interview in Admiralty. During the first interception, a reporter from Stand News used a mobile phone to record but a police officer continued to use a reporter's ID card. The officer then put his ID card in fount of the phone to stop him recording. The reporter was then intercepted by the police for the second time at the same location. During the live broadcast on the mobile phone, some police officers snatched the reporter's live broadcast equipment. During the interception, some police officers snatched the reporter's mobile phone and destroyed the reporter's mobile phone screen.

Lau was arrested by the police on the grounds of "incitement to the mood of the masses" and "violation of the condition that the garden shall not be forced to burst (crowded) in the notice of no objection". The next day, the police changed the charges of "resistance office" and "violation of the conditions of the notice of no objection" and are currently being detained at the Wan Chai Police Station. Later, the police renamed it "without timely assistance in dissolving the assembly and deliberately neglecting to execute the police order", thus violating section 17A of the Public Security Ordinance, Chapter 245 of the Laws of Hong Kong.

Organizers said 150,000 attended the demonstration, while police estimated a peak attendance of 11,680.

=== 20 January ===
==== Lunch with You rally ====
Protesters called a "Lunch with You" rally in Central. Nearly a hundred people gathered in the atrium of the Landmark and chanted anti-government slogans.

==== 7.21 six-month anniversary rally ====
Some groups held a 7.21 "Half Anniversary" rally in Tin Shui Wai with the theme "Guard the Truth, Don't Forget 185/6 = 721". At about 7:30 pm, about a hundred citizens participated, some wearing school uniforms or black clothes and wearing masks. At the scene, joint signing sessions and Lennon paintings were set up to allow participants to write their opinions and signatures. At least four police cars and dozens of police officers were seen around the rally. The rally began in the form of a drama about the citizens "39 minutes of waiting for the police at the West Rail Yuen Long Station on July 21". Rally representatives said that the Yuen Long attack reflected that the Yuen Long Police Force was unable to protect the citizens. They hoped to tell students through the rally and drama to urge everyone to defend the future together and to evoke everyone's original intentions through drama.

=== 21 January ===
==== Six-month anniversary of the Yuen Long attack ====
On January 21, six months after the Yuen Long attack, some citizens initiated a sit-in at multiple MTR stations. In Causeway Bay station about 50 people gathered, most wearing masks, and occasionally shouting slogans. In Yuen Long, a group of pro-democracy legislators held screenings, and urged the authorities to thoroughly investigate the attack. A large number of riot police arrived later and fired pepper spray. Police made multiple arrests.

==== Lunch with You rally ====
At 1 pm, protesters called a "Lunch with You" rally at the Hong Kong Industrial Centre, Cheung Sha Wan Road. Demonstrators held banners and shouted slogans. A large number of police officers and riot police arrived at Lai Chi Kok and warned the citizens are participating in an unlawful assembly.

=== 23 January ===
Some citizens launched a "lunch with you" demonstration to express their demands. At 1:00 pm, office workers responded to the call for action. More than 10 citizens gathered in the mall. This increased to more than 40 people. At about 2 pm, the participants dispersed peacefully.

=== 24 January: Chinese New Year's Eve ===
==== Wong Tai Sin Temple protest ====
A large number of worshippers gathered at the Wong Tai Sin Temple in the evening. When entering the temple (11 pm) there was a chanting ceremony; Police officers searched the identity cards of the citizens. Most of them wore masks. During the period, nearly 100 people in black shouted anti-government slogans, and citizens waved the banner with the slogans written. Riot police were on alert and the atmosphere was tense. Subsequently, 2 citizens were intercepted by the police and a large number of people in black stared at police officers. Police officers remained calm to the citizens present.

==== Chinese New Year's Eve protest ====
On Chinese New Year’s Eve, many citizens held a rally outside the Lai Chi Kok Reception Centre in support of demonstrators in prison. Some people held up the slogans "No difference with courage" and "Let's go up and down together", and raised the phone's light to indicate "support, hold on to the end".

=== 25 January: Chinese New Year ===
To mark four years since the Mong Kok riots, people sold street food opposite Langham Place in Mong Kok. A number of hawkers set up stalls to sell food. More than a hundred people arrived to buy the street food. A group of riot police patrolled and conducted searches around Nathan Road. At 10 pm, some people in black used rubbish as a roadblock on Portland Street. A large number of riot police arrived in cars. The leading police cars rushed towards the gathering road at high speed. In the crowd, the people in black dispersed, and a large number of riot police officers got out of their cars and hunted down people.

=== 26 January ===
In Mong Kok people continued to mark four years since the Mong Kok riots. A large number of riot police officers were dispatched to use tear gas to disperse crowds. An incident occurred triggering riot police to rush on to Portland Street, resulting in confrontation between the police and the public. After being dispersed several times on Portland Street, the riot police arrested at least 3 citizens. In the meantime, police fired tear gas and hit a demonstrator's neck. A female reporter wanted to obtain the police officer's serial number and was shot by pepper spray. The female reporter later cried and had an asthma attack. By 2 a.m., a group of reporters, volunteer first aiders and the public on Portland Street were intercepted by riot police officers, with a total of about 200 people, half of whom were citizens. Police officers checked their identity cards.

=== 27 January ===
==== Mong Kok riots anniversary ====
In Mong Kok people continued to mark four years since the Mong Kok riots. Hawker stalls were set up in Mong Kok, the atmosphere was peaceful. By 9 pm, nearly 30 people gathered and called slogans at the Grand Plaza near the exit of Mong Kok Station, no confusion occurred.

==== Government House Petition ====
About 20 people from the League of Social Democrats and the Labour Party marched to the Government House in the morning to protest against the police's handling of the anti-government protests. They considered it a police riot and police officers should not raise their pay. They criticised the government for disregarding public opinion and considered the government ineffective in governance.

=== 28 January ===
Some citizens launched a "Lennon Day" event in multiple districts. These events caused some confrontation between protesters and police.

=== 29 January ===
Some citizens called to go "shopping" in Central. At about 1 pm, dozens of people gathered on the first floor of a mall. During the period, they held banners. Some security guards cordoned off parts of the mall with tape. Afterwards, the protesters walked around the mall. The mall also sent security guards along the way. The crowd dispersed peacefully at about 2.30 pm.

=== 30 January ===
At about 11, the Yuen Long station Lennon wall demonstration broke into violence, a dozen people attacked several young people. Six people were injured and fled to Nam Pin Wai. A large number of riot police then arrived at the scene to set up blockades and conduct searches around the village entrance. The atmosphere was tense. The wounded were taken to the hospital afterwards. The six people were injured in the head, face and eyes, and some needed stitches.

=== 31 January: Prince Edward attack anniversary ===
To commemorate five months since the Prince Edward station attack, demonstrators gathered at Exit B1 of Prince Edward Station. Many people laid flowers on the site. Riot police were on alert outside the station. During the demonstration, the flowers placed by the citizens were removed every 15 minutes and the citizens were intercepted. At 8:31 pm, nearly a hundred citizens sat in silence. At about 9.30pm, masked demonstrators gathered outside Mong Kok police station and blocked the road near Prince Edward Road West and the road near Portland Street with debris. A group of riot police rushed to disperse the group. Police officers at the scene asked reporters to step back and no one was arrested. At least seven people were arrested that night.

== Counter-demonstrations ==
On 12 January, dozens of people held a rally in Yuen Long to urge the police to arrest Democratic Party lawmaker Lam Cheuk-ting over what they claim is his role in a mob attack on protesters and passersby in the Yuen Long in July last year. Participants echoed false accusations previously levelled against Lam by pro-Beijing legislator Junius Ho and pro-police supporters that he had incited a group of black-clad rioters to come to Yuen Long. Lam was among those who were hospitalised following the attack, sustaining a wound to his mouth that required 18 stitches. He said people pushing the false narrative had been distorting the truth, noting that security camera footage clearly shows that the white-clad mob of triads had been attacking people even before he arrived.

On 18 January, around 50 people gathered outside Mong Kok Police Station presenting officers with noodles and snacks to express their gratitude to the force for its handling of anti-government protests. The group, calling themselves Hong Kong Force of Peace, shouted slogans praising officers’ loyalty and "courage" in stopping violence and restoring order.

Outside Broadcasting House in Kowloon Tong (the headquarters of public broadcaster RTHK) on the same day, around 100 protesters from the pro-police group Politihk Social Strategic protested against what they called anti-government bias in RTHK's programmes. The demonstrators chanted slogans, calling RTHK a "cockroach radio station".
