= Alliance for Universal Suffrage =

Organization

- 終極普選聯盟
- Successor: Alliance for True Democracy
- Formation: January 2010
- Dissolved: January 2013
- Type: NGO
- Purpose: To achieve full universal suffrage in Hong Kong
- Convenor: Fung Wai-wah
- Affiliations: Pro-democracy camp

Alliance for Universal Suffrage
- Traditional Chinese: 終極普選聯盟
Transcriptions
Yue: Cantonese
- Yale Romanization: Jūng gihk póu syún lyùhn màhng
- Jyutping: Zung^{1} gik^{6} pou^{2} syun^{2} lyun^{4} mang^{4}

The Alliance for Universal Suffrage was a coalition formed by 11 pro-democracy parties and groups in Hong Kong. The Convenor of the Alliance was Fung Wai-wah.

It provided a single point of contact to interface with the governments of Hong Kong and China, especially to press for more democratic formulas for the Chief Executive election in 2017 and the Legco election in 2020.

The grouping is seen as more 'moderate' than the League of Social Democrats and the Civic Party, which have triggered Legco by-elections in May 2010, by having five of their members resign and stand for reelection in a 'de facto referendum' on democratic progress in Hong Kong.

In June 2010, the central government accepted the reformed proposal suggested by the Democratic Party after negotiating with the Democratic Party and the alliance. The compromise made with Beijing was fiercely attacked by the radical faction of the pro-democracy camp, the League of Social Democrats.

In 2013, the Convenor Fung Wai-wah announced the alliance "will be indefinitely suspended" in order to form a new body with other pan-democrats on the matter of full universal suffrage. In March, the new alliance the Alliance for True Democracy was launched.

== Stances ==
In March 2010 the Alliance outlined its proposals for electoral reform in Hong Kong.

For 2012 it suggests expanding the number of seats in Legco by a third, to 80. Half would still be returned by functional constituencies - trade-based seats with small electorates. This is not so different from the Hong Kong government proposal to increase the number of seats to 70, also with half of them for functional constituencies.

For the 2017 election, the Alliance proposes a nominating committee of 1,200 people that can put forward candidates for chief executive, with any candidates who obtain 100 nominations eligible to run for election. It wants Legco to have 100 seats by 2020, with half chosen by proportional representation by all the city's voters.

Other specific requests made to Beijing include:

- That a candidate for chief executive in 2012 would not need more nominations than in at the 2008 election;
- That Legco's functional constituencies would be scrapped by 2020; and
- That elections in 2012 and 2016 would be increasingly democratic.

== Membership of the Alliance for Universal Suffrage ==
Members of the Alliance include:

- Democratic Party (Hong Kong)
- Hong Kong Confederation of Trade Unions
- Hong Kong Professional Teachers' Union
- Hong Kong Social Workers General Union
- Power for Democracy
- Professional Commons
- SynergyNet

== See also ==
- Consultation Document on the Methods for Selecting the Chief Executive and for Forming the LegCo in 2012
- Politics of Hong Kong
- Democratic development in Hong Kong
- List of political parties in Hong Kong
