= Alliance for True Democracy =

Political coalition in Hong Kong

- Formation: 21 March 2013
- Dissolved: c. September 2021
- Type: NGO
- Purpose: To achieve full universal suffrage in Hong Kong
- Members: 27 pan-democracy Legislative Council members
- Convenor: Joseph Cheng
- Affiliations: Pan-democracy camp
- Website: www.atd.hk

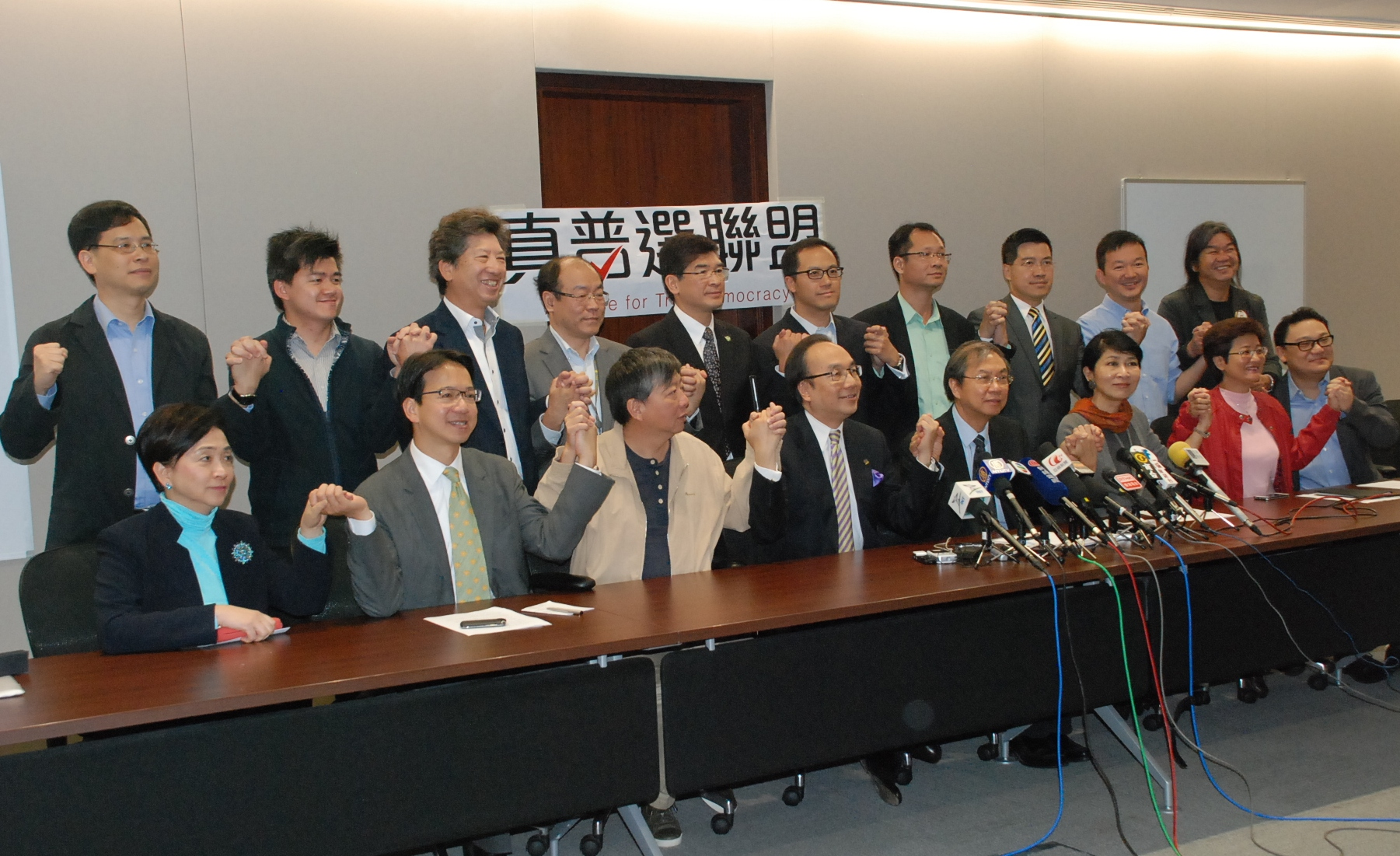
Members of the alliance at the press conference on 21 March 2013.

The Alliance for True Democracy (ATD) was a coalition of the pan-democrats to fight for full universal suffrage in Hong Kong. It was formed on 21 March 2013 by 12 pan-democratic groups on the basis of the Alliance for Universal Suffrage formed in 2010 and suspended in January 2013 due to the split over strategy on dealing the Beijing government. The convenor Joseph Cheng Yu-shek, political scientist at the City University and leader of the Power for Democracy said the alliance priority would be to strive for public support in the political reform debate, and to form a consensus proposal by the end of the year.

ATD was likely dissolved in August or September 2021 after 612 Humanitarian Relief Fund, the organisation that supported arrested anti-extradition protestors, confirmed their mother group would shortly apply for liquidation, and that 612 Fund would cease operating on 28 September 2021.

== Membership ==
It was composed of 27 Legislative Council members from 12 pan-democratic groups including:

- Civic Party
- Democratic Party (Withdrew in 2014)
- Hong Kong Association for Democracy and People's Livelihood
- Hong Kong Professional Teachers' Union
- Hong Kong Social Workers General Union
- Labour Party
- League of Social Democrats
- Neighbourhood and Workers Service Centre
- Neo Democrats
- People Power
- Power for Democracy
- Professional Commons

== Proposals ==
=== 2017 Chief Executive election plan ===
During the 2014 Hong Kong electoral reform consultation, the Alliance for True Democracy released its "Chief Executive Election Plan" in January 2014 with the support of all 27 pro-democratic Legislative Council members for the 2017 Chief Executive election. The election plan includes three channels for nomination: civil nomination, political party nomination, and nomination by the nominating committee. Civil nomination demands a candidate to secure the signed endorsement of 1% of the registered voters; political party nomination requires a political party receiving 5% or more of the total valid votes in the last Legislative Council direct election. The nominating committee shall not refuse to endorse any civil and political party nominees who meet the legal requirements, such as not less than 40 years old, has no right of abode in any foreign country; political conditions such as “love China, love Hong Kong” and “no confrontations with Beijing” are not acceptable. The Alliance also demands the abolition of the existing stipulation which disallows the chief executive belonging to a political party membership.

=== Legislative election proposals ===
For the Legislative Council elections, the Scholars Group of the ATD put forward proposals for the transition toward the universal suffrage: For 2016 Legislative Council Election, the Scholars Group suggests:

Proposal A	Proposal B
Number of seats in Legislative Council increases to 80.; 60 seats elected by universal suffrage, including 35 seats by proportional representation with the current division of constituency.; 25 seats will be elected under proportional representation with the whole Hong Kong as a constituency. There is no election threshold, and the largest remainder method" and Hare quota are adopted. Each voter would then have two votes in two tiers of proportional representation.; Functional Constituency is reduced to 20 seats. In the 30 current traditional FC seats, there are 9 seats for professional sectors; 15 seats for commercial and economic sectors; and 6 seats for social and political sectors. We suggest combine those seats into three large constituencies along the lines above, with each constituency returning two-thirds of its original number of seats. That is, the professional sectors will return 6 seats; 10 seats for commercial and economic sectors; 4 seats for social and political sectors. In each constituency, each elector can cast only one vote. The candidates that get the most votes win.; The District Council (II) FC seats will be cancelled.; Split Voting in the Legco will be abolished.	Number of seats in Legislative Council is 80.; 60 seats will be elected by universal suffrage, including 35 seats by proportional representation with current division of constituencies.; 25 seats will be elected by FPTP. Hong Kong is divided into 25 constituencies, with about 150,000 voters in each constituency.; Functional Constituency is reduced to 20 seats. In the 30 current traditional FC seats, there are 9 seats for professional sectors; 15 seats for commercial and economic sectors; and 6 seats for social and political sectors. We suggest combine those seats into three large constituencies along the lines above, with each constituency returning two-thirds of its original number of seats. That is, the professional sectors will return 6 seats; 10 seats for commercial and economic sectors; 4 seats for social and political sectors. In each constituency, each elector can cast only one vote. The candidates that get the most votes win.; The District Council (II) FC seats will be cancelled.; Split Voting in the Legco will be abolished.

For the universal suffrage of the Legislative Council, there are two proposals from the Scholar Group:

Proposal A	Proposal B
Total number of seats in Legislative Council is 90.; 40 seats will be elected under first-past-the-post (FPTP) system. With approximately 4 million registered voters, there would be about 100,000 voters in each constituency.; 50 seats will be elected by proportional representation, with the whole Hong Kong as one constituency with current largest remainder method and Hare quota. There is no election threshold in the proposal, any list that obtains more than 2% of votes (assuming voter turnout rate is about 50%, that is about 40,000 votes) can secure one seat.; Compare to proposal B, this proposal has fewer seats elected under FPTP, and has no election threshold, it would be relatively beneficial to small parties.	Number of seats in Legislative Council is 90.; 50 seats will be elected under FPTP. With about 4 million registered voters with estimated about 80,000 voters in each constituency.; 40 seats will be elected under “proportional representation”. Hong Kong will be divided into 6 to 7 constituencies, each constituency will return 6 to 7 seats, and D'Hondt method will be adopted.; Compare to proposal A, this proposal has more seats elected under FPTP. The estimation is that parties with vote share lower than 5% may not get elected. The adoption of the D'Hondt method will reduce the fragmentation of the Legco.
