= Education (constituency) =

Hong Kong functional constituency

Education Constituencies
- Functional constituency for the Legislative Council of Hong Kong
- Region: Hong Kong
- Electorate: 74,618

Current constituency
- Created: 1985
- Number of members: One
- Member: Tang Fei (Independent)

Education Constituency
- Traditional Chinese: 教育界
Transcriptions
Yue: Cantonese
- Yale Romanization: Gaau yuhk gaai
- Jyutping: Gaau^{3} juk^{6} gaai^{3}

Teaching Constituency
- Traditional Chinese: 教學界
Transcriptions
Yue: Cantonese
- Yale Romanization: Gaau hohk gaai
- Jyutping: Gaau^{3} hok^{6} gaai^{3}

The Education functional constituency, formerly called Teaching from 1985 to 1995, is a functional constituency in the elections for the Legislative Council of Hong Kong. It was one of the 12 functional constituency seats created for the 1985 Legislative Council election. Since 1998, it has been the functional constituency with the most registered voters, including registered teachers, principals, managers of schools, full-time academic staff, members of the councils of the universities in Hong Kong and board of governors of the institutes of higher educations. In 2020, it had 85,698 registered voters, as compared to the Finance constituency who had only 121 voters.

The constituency was historically one of the few pro-democracy strongholds in the functional constituencies. For most of its history it was held by the Hong Kong Professional Teachers' Union (PTU), the largest teachers' union in Hong Kong, and was held by PTU president Szeto Wah until he switched to a geographical constituency direct election in the 1991 election. He was succeeded by Cheung Man-kwong who held the seat from 1991 to 2012. Beginning in 2012, it was represented by Ip Kin-yuen until he resigned en masse from the office with other pro-democrats in protest to Beijing's disqualification of the four pro-democracy legislators.

After the dissolution of the PLU and the exclusion of the pro-democracy camp from the political system after the 2021 electoral overhaul, the seat has been represented by the Hong Kong Federation of Education Workers (FEW), the largest pro-Beijing teachers' union.

== Composition ==
The Education functional constituency is composed of—

- full-time academic staff engaged in teaching or research and administrative staff of equivalent rank in the following institutions—
  - institutions of higher education funded through the University Grants Committee;
  - approved post secondary colleges registered under the Post Secondary Colleges Ordinance (Cap. 320);
  - technical colleges established under the Vocational Training Council Ordinance (Cap. 1130);
  - The Hong Kong Academy for Performing Arts;
  - The Open University of Hong Kong; and
- full-time academic staff engaged in teaching or research and administrative staff of equivalent rank in the institutions which—
  - offer post secondary education leading to the award of any qualification entered into the Qualifications Register established under the Accreditation of Academic and Vocational Qualifications Ordinance (Cap. 592); and
  - are set up by—
    - an institution of higher education funded through the University Grants Committee;
    - The Hong Kong Academy for Performing Arts; or
    - The Open University of Hong Kong; and
    - members of each of the following bodies—
  - Council of the University of Hong Kong;
  - Council of The Chinese University of Hong Kong;
  - Council of The Hong Kong University of Science and Technology;
  - Council of the City University of Hong Kong;
  - Council of The Hong Kong Polytechnic University;
  - Council of The Hong Kong Academy for Performing Arts;
  - Council of The Open University of Hong Kong;
  - the Vocational Training Council;
  - Council of The Education University of Hong Kong;
  - Council of the Hong Kong Baptist University;
  - Council of Lingnan University;
  - Board of Governors of the Hong Kong Shue Yan University
  - Board of Governors of the Caritas Institute of Higher Education;
  - Board of Governors of the Chu Hai College of Higher Education;
  - Board of Governors of the Centennial College;
  - Board of Governors of the Tung Wah College;
  - Board of Governors of The Hang Seng University of Hong Kong;
  - Board of Governors of the Hong Kong Nang Yan College of Higher Education;
  - Board of Governors of the HKCT Institute of Higher Education;
  - Board of Governors of the Gratia Christian College;
  - Board of Governors of Yew Chung College of Early Childhood Education; and
- registered teachers registered under the Education Ordinance (Cap. 279); and
- permitted teachers engaged in full-time employment in schools registered or provisionally registered under the Education Ordinance (Cap. 279); and
- teachers and principals of schools entirely maintained and controlled by the Government; and
- persons whose principal or only employment is that of full-time teaching with the following institutions—
  - technical institutes, industrial training centres or skills centres established under the Vocational Training Council Ordinance (Cap. 1130);
  - industrial training centres established under the repealed Industrial Training (Construction Industry) Ordinance (Cap. 317) and maintained under the Construction Industry Council Ordinance (Cap. 587);
  - industrial training centres established under the Construction Industry Council Ordinance (Cap. 587);
  - industrial training centres established under the Industrial Training (Clothing Industry) Ordinance (Cap. 318);
  - Hong Chi Association—Hong Chi Pinehill Integrated Vocational Training Centre;
  - Caritas Lok Mo Integrated Vocational Training Centre of Caritas—Hong Kong incorporated under the Caritas—Hong Kong Incorporation Ordinance (Cap. 1092); and
- registered managers of schools registered under the Education Ordinance (Cap. 279).

== Return members ==
Election	Member	Party
1985	Szeto Wah	Nonpartisan (PTU)
1988	Szeto Wah	Nonpartisan (PTU)
1991	Cheung Man-kwong	PTU/UD→PTU/Democratic
1995	Cheung Man-kwong	PTU/UD→PTU/Democratic
Not represented in the PLC (1997–1998)
1998	Cheung Man-kwong	PTU/Democratic
2000	Cheung Man-kwong	PTU/Democratic
2004	Cheung Man-kwong	PTU/Democratic
2008	Cheung Man-kwong	PTU/Democratic
2012	Ip Kin-yuen	PTU
2016	Ip Kin-yuen	PTU
2021	Chu Kwok-keung	FEW
2025	Tang Fei	Independent (FEW)

== Electoral results ==
=== 2020s ===
2025 Legislative Council election: Education
Party	Candidate	Votes	%	±%
Independent (FEW)	Tang Fei	13,759	55.11	
Independent (FEW)	Ray Cheung Chak-chung	11,206	44.89	
Majority		2,553	10.22	
Total valid votes		24,965	100.00	
Rejected ballots		1,733	6.49	
Turnout		26,698	35.78	+6.76
Registered electors		74,618		
Independent gain from FEW		Swing		

2021 Legislative Council election: Education
Party	Candidate	Votes	%	±%
FEW	Chu Kwok-keung	10,641	46.16	
Independent	James Lam Yat-fung	4,544	19.71	
Independent	Lam Wing-sze	3,280	14.23	
HKKGEPE	Ting Kin-wa	2,533	10.99	
Independent	Jessica Man Sze-wing	2,054	8.91	
Majority		6,097	26.45	
Total valid votes		23,052	100.00	
Rejected ballots		1,652		
Turnout		24,704	29.02	
Registered electors		85,117		
FEW gain from PTU		Swing		

=== 2010s ===
2016 Legislative Council election: Education
Party	Candidate	Votes	%	±%
PTU	Ip Kin-yuen	45,984	71.69	–3.73
Independent (FEW)	Choi Yuk-lin	18,158	28.31	
Majority		27,826	43.38	
Total valid votes		64,142	100.00	
Rejected ballots		1,821		
Turnout		65,963	74.80	+4.17
Registered electors		88,185		
PTU hold		Swing		

2012 Legislative Council election: Education
Party	Candidate	Votes	%	±%
PTU	Ip Kin-yuen	46,535	75.42	+3.81
Independent	Ho Hon-kuen	15,170	24.58	+1.38
Majority		31,365	50.84	
Total valid votes		61,705	100.00	
Rejected ballots		3,773		
Turnout		65,478	70.44	+10.55
Registered electors		92,957		
PTU hold		Swing		

=== 2000s ===
2008 Legislative Council election: Education
Party	Candidate	Votes	%	±%
PTU (Democratic)	Cheung Man-kwong	37,876	71.61	−11.33
Independent	Ho Hon-kuen	12,272	23.20	
Independent	Yu Yee-wah	2,746	5.19	
Majority		25,604	48.41	
Total valid votes		52,894	100.00	
Rejected ballots		1,421		
Turnout		54,315	59.89	
Registered electors		90,693		
PTU hold		Swing		

2004 Legislative Council election: Education
Party	Candidate	Votes	%	±%
PTU (Democratic)	Cheung Man-kwong	44,517	82.94	−3.35
Independent	Yu Kai-chun	9,155	17.06	
Majority		35,362	65.88	
Total valid votes		53,672	100.00	
Rejected ballots		2,284		
Turnout		55,956	72.02	
Registered electors		77,696		
PTU hold		Swing		

2000 Legislative Council election: Education
Party	Candidate	Votes	%	±%
PTU (Democratic)	Cheung Man-kwong	35,793	86.29	−0.47
Independent	Lee Kit-kong	5,686	13.71	
Majority		30,107	72.58	
Total valid votes		41,479	100.00	
Rejected ballots		900		
Turnout		42,379	59.45	
Registered electors		71,284		
PTU hold		Swing		

=== 1990s ===
1998 Legislative Council election: Education
Party	Candidate	Votes	%	±%
PTU (Democratic)	Cheung Man-kwong	34,864	86.76	+5.54
Independent	Li Sze-yuen	5,319	13.24	
Majority		29,545	73.52	
Total valid votes		40,183	100.00	
Rejected ballots		679		
Turnout		40,862	66.79	
Registered electors		61,184		
PTU win (new seat)				

1995 Legislative Council election: Education
Party	Candidate	Votes	%	±%
PTU (Democratic)	Cheung Man-kwong	19,558	81.31	−8.51
Independent	Leung Siu-tong	4,496	18.69	
Majority		15,062	62.62	
Total valid votes		24,054	100.00	
Rejected ballots		297		
Turnout		24,351	57.43	
Registered electors		42,404		
PTU hold		Swing		

1991 Legislative Council election: Teaching
Party	Candidate	Votes	%	±%
PTU (United Democrats)	Cheung Man-kwong	15,193	89.82	
FEW	Ho King-on	886	5.24	
STA	Walter Wou Tchong-hong	836	4.94	
Majority		14,307	84.58	
Total valid votes		16,915	100.00	
Rejected ballots		119		
Turnout		17,034	44.04	
Registered electors		38,678		
PTU hold		Swing		

=== 1980s ===
1988 Legislative Council election: Teaching
Party	Candidate	Votes	%	±%
Independent (PTU)	Szeto Wah	Unopposed		
Independent hold		Swing		

1985 Legislative Council election: Teaching
Party	Candidate	Votes	%	±%
Independent (PTU)	Szeto Wah	12,706	68.64	
Independent	Luk Yip Jing-ping	2,655	14.34	
Civic	Ko Gra-yee	2,165	11.70	
Independent	Chan Yat-tong	577	3.12	
Independent	Wu Siu-wai	409	2.21	
Majority		10,051	54.30	
Total valid votes		18,512	100.00	
Independent win (new seat)				
