= Joseph Cheng =

Hong Kong political scientist

- 鄭宇碩
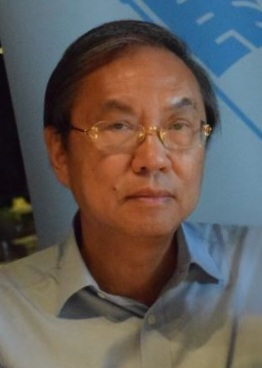

Election Committee Higher Education Subsector
- In office 2006–2016

Personal details
- Born: 1949 (age 76–77)
- Citizenship: Australian
- Party: Civic Party
- Other political affiliations: Pan-democratic camp Power for Democracy; Alliance for True Democracy
- Education: La Salle College; University of Hong Kong; Victoria University of Wellington; Flinders University
- Occupation: Professor
- Known for: Universal suffrage activism

Joseph Cheng

Academic work
- Discipline: Political Science
- Sub-discipline: Chinese foreign policy Hong Kong politics International politics
- Institutions: Chinese University; Open Learning Institute; City University

Joseph Cheng Yu-shek, JP (traditional Chinese: 鄭宇碩; simplified Chinese: 郑宇硕; born 1949) is a Hong Kong political scientist and democracy activist. He was the secretary general of the Civic Party and convenor of pro-democratic groups including Power for Democracy and Alliance for True Democracy.

== Education and academic career ==
Cheng was educated at the La Salle College and graduated from the University of Hong Kong in 1972 and the Victoria University of Wellington, New Zealand in 1973 with bachelor's degrees in Social Science and Arts respectively. He later obtained a doctoral degree from the Flinders University of South Australia in 1979.

He taught at the Chinese University of Hong Kong from 1977 to 1989 and the Open Learning Institute of Hong Kong from 1989 to 1991. Between 1991 and 1992, he was hired as a full-time member of the Central Policy Unit, a think tank of the Hong Kong government. He joined the City University of Hong Kong as a chair professor of the Political Science and Coordinator of the Contemporary China Research Project in July 1992. He specialised in Chinese foreign policy, Hong Kong politics and International politics. He is the founding editor of the Hong Kong Journal of Social Sciences and The Journal of Comparative Asian Development and served as the founding president of the Asian Studies Association of Hong Kong from 2005 to 2007. He retired in 2015.

Shortly before his retirement, Cheng was demoted by the City University of Hong Kong from the chair professor to a regular professor after an investigation into allegations that he took credit for a research assistant's work in articles published in academic journals more than a decade earlier.

=== Works ===
- "China's Relations with the Gulf Cooperation Council States: Multilevel Diplomacy in a Divided Arab World." China Review 16.1 (2016): 35-64.
- "The Emergence of Radical Politics in Hong Kong: Causes and Impact." China Review 14.1 (2014): 199-232.
- "The “Chongqing Model”: What It Means to China Today." Journal of Comparative Asian Development 12.3 (2013): 411-42.
- "The 2012 Chief Executive Election in Hong Kong and the Challenges for the Chinese Authorities." East Asian Policy 5.2 (2013): 91-103.
- "China's Negotiation Strategy in Recovering Hong Kong." Issues & Studies 48.2 (2012): 127-93.
- "The Shanghai Co-operation Organisation: China's Initiative in Regional Institutional Building." Journal of Contemporary Asia 41.4 (2011): 632-56.
- "The Tiananmen Incident and the Pro-Democracy Movement in Hong Kong." China Perspectives 2 (2009): 91-100.
- "The pro-democracy movement: A lost decade?." European View 7.1 (2008): 53-66.
- "Hong Kong's Democrats Stumble." Journal of Democracy 16.1 (2005): 138-52.
- "The ASEAN‐China Free Trade Area: genesis and implications." Australian Journal of International Affairs 58.2 (2004): 257–77.
- "China's Overseas Chinese Policy in the Globalization Era: Challenges and Responses." Journal of Comparative Asian Development 3.1 (2004): 157–82. (With Ngok Kinglun and Philip Y. K. Cheng)
- "Elections and Political Parties in Hong Kong's Political Development." Journal of Contemporary Asia 31.3 (2001): 346–74.
- "Hong Kong in the Eyes of Chinese Cadres." Asian Affairs 27.2 (2000): 93–109. (with K. L. Ngok)
- "China's Policy Toward Hong Kong: A Taste of “One Country, Two Systems”." Issues & Studies 33.8 (1997): 1–25.
- "What Awaits the People of Hong Kong?." Security Dialogue 28.2 (1997): 237–42.
- Economic and social development in South China. Editor alongside Stewart MacPherson. Edward Elgar Publishing, 1996.
- "The Changing Political Attitudes of the Senior Bureaucrats in Hong Kong's Transition." China Quarterly 147 (1996): 912–37. (with Jane C. Y. Lee)
- "Prospects for Democracy in Hong Kong After the Beijing Massacre." Australian Journal of Chinese Affairs 23 (1990): 161–85.
- "The Post-1997 Government in Hong Kong: Toward a Stronger Legislature." Asian Survey 29.8 (1989): 731–48.
- "Political Modernisation in Hong Kong." Journal of Commonwealth & Comparative Politics 27.3 (1989): 294–320.
- "Hong Kong: The Pressure to Converge." International Affairs 63.2 (1987): 271–83.
- "Elite Participation in Development: Administration in the New Territories of Hong Kong." Journal of Commonwealth & Comparative Politics 22.3 (1984): 276–302.
- "The Future of Hong Kong: A Hong Kong 'Belonger's' View." International Affairs 58.3 (1982): 476–88.

== Politics ==
Cheng was a commentator on political affairs and in the early 1980s witnessed the Sino-British negotiations over Hong Kong's sovereignty.

He was the convenor of the Power for Democracy, a pro-democratic organisation set up in 2002 to co-ordinate the pan-democracy camp in the elections to avoid candidacy clashes. He was the founding secretary general of the Civic Party, in March 2003. Cheng ran for the chairmanship of the Civic Party in 2011, but was narrowly beaten by Kenneth Chan Ka-lok, who was backed by most of the party veterans, after a heated campaign that saw some complaining about the fairness of the contest. He was also director of the New School for Democracy, founded in 2011, and was a member of the Election Committee, a 1,200-member electoral college responsible for electing the Chief Executive, representing Higher Education Subsector.

In 2013, he was made convenor of the Alliance for True Democracy, which demanded genuine democracy in the 2014–15 constitutional reform proposals. The alliance put forward a three-track proposal to allow the public, political parties and a nominating committee to nominate candidate for the 2017 Chief Executive election. The proposal was not accepted as the National People's Congress Standing Committee (NPCSC) set limits on the electoral method in its decision on 31 August.

== Personal life ==
Cheng is married with one son and one daughter. He currently lives in Canberra, Australia, where he is a citizen.

Party political offices
New title	Secretary-General of Civic Party; 2006–2008	Succeeded by Kenneth Chan
