= Chu Kwok-keung =

Hong Kong teacher and politician

The Honourable Chu Kwok-keung
- 朱國強
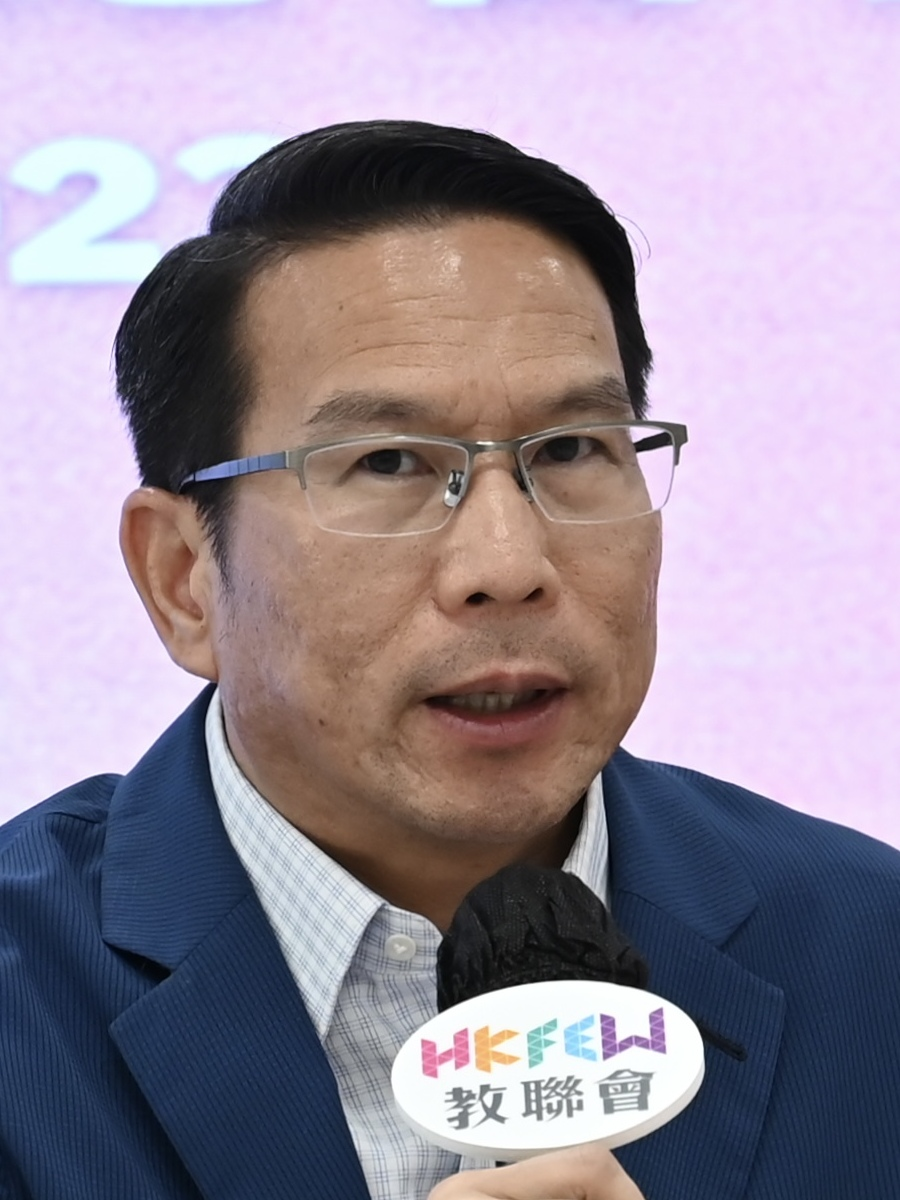
- Chu in 2023

Member of the Legislative Council
- In office 1 January 2022 – 31 December 2025
- Preceded by: Ip Kin-yuen (2020)
- Succeeded by: Tang Fei
- Constituency: Education

Personal details
- Citizenship: Hong Kong
- Party: HKFEW
- Education: Education University of Hong Kong (MEd)
- Occupation: Teacher

Chu Kwok-keung (Chinese: 朱國強) is a Hong Kong teacher and pro-Beijing politician. He was a member of Legislative Council in 2021, representing the Education constituency, until he stood down in 2025.

Chu currently serves as the vice-chairman Hong Kong Federation of Education Workers, a pro-Beijing teachers union, and as a secondary school principal. Chu supported teachers pledging allegiance to the Chinese Government, and rejected calls of quashing criminal records of students arrested during protests.

In September 2022, after a 57% yearly increase in the number of reduced classes due to an emigration wave of students from Hong Kong to other cities, Chu suggested filling up the classes with mainland Chinese students.

== Electoral performances ==
2021 Legislative Council election: Education
Party	Candidate	Votes	%	±%
FEW	Chu Kwok-keung	10,641	46.16	
Independent	James Lam Yat-fung	4,544	19.71	
Independent	Lam Wing-sze	3,280	14.23	
HKKGEPE	Ting Kin-wa	2,533	10.99	
Independent	Jessica Man Sze-wing	2,054	8.91	
Majority		6,097	26.45	
Total valid votes		23,052	100.00	
Rejected ballots		1,652		
Turnout		24,704	29.02	
Registered electors		85,117		
FEW gain from PTU		Swing		

Legislative Council of Hong Kong
Preceded by Ip Kin-yuen	Member of Legislative Council; Representative for Education; 2022–2025	Succeeded by Tang Fei
