= Cheung Man-kwong =

Hong Kong politician

- 張文光
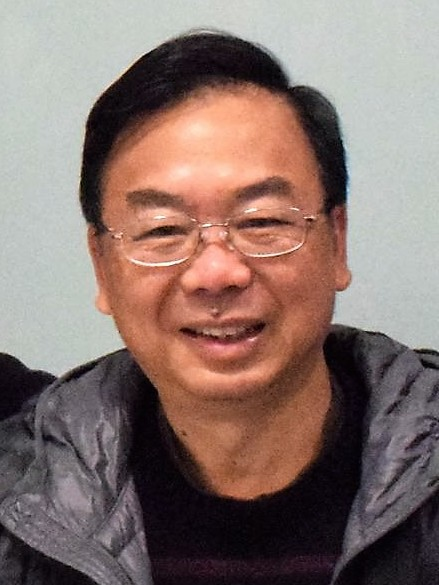
- Cheung in 2017

President of the Hong Kong Professional Teachers' Union
- In office 1990–2010
- Preceded by: Szeto Wah
- Succeeded by: Fung Wai-wah

Member of Legislative Council of Hong Kong
- In office 9 October 1991 – 30 June 1997
- Preceded by: Szeto Wah
- Succeeded by: Replaced by Provisional Legislative Council
- Constituency: Teaching/Education
- In office 1 October 1998 – 30 September 2012
- Preceded by: New parliament
- Succeeded by: Ip Kin-yuen
- Constituency: Education

Personal details
- Born: 15 September 1954 (age 71) Hong Kong
- Party: Democratic Party
- Spouse: Ho Kwok-ching
- Education: Chinese University of Hong Kong (BSocSc)

Cheung Man-kwong (Chinese: 張文光, born 15 September 1954) is a Hong Kong politician, who is a member of the Yuen Long District Council.

== Background ==
Born in Hong Kong with family roots in Taishan, Cheung was a member of the Hong Kong Legislative Council representing the Education functional constituency. He is a member of Democratic Party and former chairman of Hong Kong Professional Teachers' Union. He obtained his bachelor's degree from the Economics department of the Chinese University of Hong Kong and is a registered teacher.

== Views, policy positions and Legco voting ==
In June 2010, he voted with the party in favour of the government's 2012 constitutional reform package, which included the late amendment by the Democratic Party – accepted by the Beijing government – to hold a popular vote for five new District Council functional constituencies.

Legislative Council of Hong Kong
Preceded by Szeto Wah	Member of Legislative Council; Representative for Teaching; 1991–1995	Succeeded by Himself as Representative for Education
Preceded by Himself as Representative for Teaching	Member of Legislative Council; Representative for Education; 1995–1997	Replaced by Provisional Legislative Council
New parliament	Member of Legislative Council; Representative for Education; 1998–2012	Succeeded by Ip Kin-yuen
Educational offices
Preceded by Szeto Wah	Chairman of HKPTU; 1990–2010	Succeeded by Fung Wai-wah
