= Gratia Christian College =

- 宏恩基督教學院
- Established: 2015; 11 years ago
- Parent institution: Gratia Christian College Ltd (宏恩基督教書院有限公司)
- President: Dr. H S Chui, JP
- Academic staff: 30
- Students: 500 (as of September, 2024)
- Location: 1/F, 69 - 119 Broadway, Mei Foo Sun Chuen Phase 4, Kowloon (Mei Foo Campus） 5 Wai Chi Street, Shek Kip Mei, Kowloon (Shek Kip Mei Campus), Hong Kong
- Website: Official website

Gratia Christian College
- Traditional Chinese: 宏恩基督教學院
Transcriptions
Yue: Cantonese
- Yale Romanization: Wàhng yān gēi dūk gaau hohk yuhn
- Jyutping: Wang4 jan1 gei1 duk1 gaau3 hok6 jyun6

Gratia Christian College (GCC, Chinese: 宏恩基督教學院) is a private Christian higher education institution in Hong Kong. The College was founded by the former head of the Hang Seng University, Chui Hong-sheung.

== Schools and programmes ==
- School of Business
  - Bachelor of Service Management (Honours) Programme
  - Higher Diploma in Transformative Business Management Programme
- School of Psychology
  - Bachelor of Psychology (Honours) Programme
  - Higher Diploma in Psychology and Counselling Programme
- School of Social Work
  - Bachelor of Social Work (Honours) Programme
  - Bachelor of Social Work (Honours) Part-time Conversion Programme
  - Higher Diploma in Social Work
- School of Early Childhood Education
  - Higher Diploma in Early Childhood Education Programme
- School of Christian Ministry
  - Higher Diploma in Christian Ministry Programme
- School of General Education
  - Diploma in Pre-university Studies Programme
