= Ip Kin-yuen =

- 葉建源
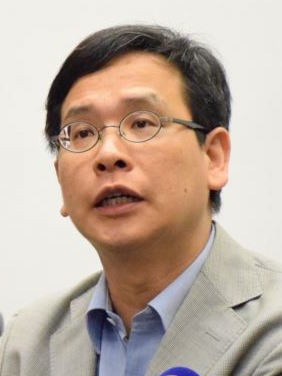
- Ip Kin-yuen

Member of the Legislative Council
- In office 1 October 2012 – 1 December 2020
- Preceded by: Cheung Man-kwong
- Succeeded by: Chu Kwok-keung (2022)
- Constituency: Education

Personal details
- Born: 1961 (age 64–65) Hong Kong
- Party: Meeting Point (1980s–94); Democratic Party (1994–2006)
- Other political affiliations: Hong Kong Professional Teachers' Union
- Education: Sing Yin Secondary School; University of Hong Kong (BA, PCEd, MEd)
- Occupation: Legislative Councillor

Ip Kin-yuen
- Traditional Chinese: 葉建源
- Simplified Chinese: 叶建源
Transcriptions
Standard Mandarin
- Hanyu Pinyin: Yè Jiànyuán
Yue: Cantonese
- Yale Romanization: Yihp Gin-yùhn
- Jyutping: Jip^{6} Gin^{3}-jyun^{4}

Ip Kin-yuen (Chinese: 葉建源, born 1961) is a former member of the Legislative Council of Hong Kong for Education constituency and a chief executive for Hong Kong Professional Teachers' Union.

== Background ==
Ip graduated from the University of Hong Kong with a Bachelor of Arts in Chinese Language and Chinese History, Postgraduate Certificate in Education, and Master of Education. During his study at the University of Hong Kong, he was the vice president of the Student Union in 1983 and drafted letters to UK Prime Minister Margaret Thatcher and PRC Premier Zhao Ziyang stating the Student Union's stance for returning Hong Kong sovereignty back to China. He joined the political group Meeting Point which composed of professionals who, during the Sino-British negotiations, advocated democracy in Hong Kong under Chinese sovereign.

He was also a founding member of the Democratic Party, and its education spokesman, until 2006 when he left the party.

In 2006, he began serving on the Election Committee for the Education constituency.

In 2009, Ip was appointed to Hong Kong Institute of Education but was fired by Fanny Law in the crisis of HKIEd-CUHK merger in 2007.

Ip was elected in Legislative Council of Hong Kong in September 2012 and retained his seat, with 71 percent of the votes cast, in 2016.

Legislative Council of Hong Kong
Preceded by Cheung Man-kwong	Member of Legislative Council; Representative for Education; 2012–2020	Succeeded by Chu Kwok-keung
