= Power for Democracy =

Political party in Hong Kong

Power for Democracy 民主動力
- Convenor: Andrew Chiu
- Founded: 2002
- Dissolved: 27 February 2021
- Ideology: Liberalism (Hong Kong)
- Regional affiliation: Pro-democracy camp
- Colours: Blue

Website
- pfd.org.hk at the Wayback Machine (archived 2017-09-05)

Power for Democracy
- Traditional Chinese: 民主動力
Transcriptions
Yue: Cantonese
- Yale Romanization: Màhn jyú duhng lihk
- Jyutping: Man^{4} zyu^{2} dung^{6} lik^{6}

Power for Democracy (Chinese: 民主動力; PfD) was a pro-democracy political group in Hong Kong established by a group of pro-democracy activists in 2002. It worked mainly as a mediating platform for electoral coordination between the pro-democratic parties. It was announced to have disbanded on 27 February 2021.

== History ==
The group was formed by the most prominent pro-democracy advocates in Hong Kong, which included Lee Cheuk-yan, Albert Ho, Andrew To, Fung Chi-wood, Fernando Cheung, Phyllis Luk, Leung Yiu-chung, Joseph Cheng Yu-shek, Andrew Cheng, Lau Ka-wah, Emily Lau, John Clancey and Eddie Chan. It strives for the further democracy development and civil society and also the full implementation of the international conventions on human rights to maintain Hong Kong's status as an international city and a model of Chinese society.

The current convenor is Andrew Chiu Ka-yin, an Eastern District Councillor and Democratic Party member, who replaced Joseph Cheng Yu-shek, a political scientist at the City University of Hong Kong and also a member of the Civic Party in 2014. The leadership is mostly composed of politicians from Civic Party and Democratic Party.

It has been working as a mediating platform for electoral coordination between the pro-democratic parties since its establishment. It led the electoral coordination between pro-democratic candidates in the 2004 Legislative Council election with Chu Yiu-ming's Hong Kong Democratic Development Network. From 2007 District Council elections, the group is also in charge of the Democratic Coalition for DC Election, a group for coordination between the pro-democratic parties to avoid having candidates in the same constituency in the District Council elections.

In the 2016 Legislative Council election, the group conducted two opinion polls for the pro-democracy voters. The cost for partly covered by 12 businesspeople including George Cautherley, vice-chairman of the Hong Kong Democratic Foundation.

On 27 February 2021, after pro-democracy activists were arrested under the national security law, Andrew Chiu said that the party had disbanded since Hong Kong had come to a "new political era".
