= Pro-democracy camp (Hong Kong) =

Hong Kong political faction in favour of universal suffrage

Pro-democracy camp 民主派
- Founded: 27 October 1986
- Ideology: Liberalism (HK); Liberal democracy; Factions: Localism (HK); Socialism (HK)
- Colours: Yellow and green (customary)

Pro-democracy camp
- Chinese: 民主派
Transcriptions
Standard Mandarin
- Hanyu Pinyin: Mín zhǔ pài
- Bopomofo: ㄇㄧㄣˊ ㄓㄨˇ ㄆㄞˋ
- Wade–Giles: Min^{2} chu^{3} p'ai^{4}
- IPA: [mǐn ʈʂù pʰâɪ]
Yue: Cantonese
- Yale Romanization: Màhn jyú paai
- Jyutping: Man4 zyu2 paai3
- IPA: [mɐn˩ tsy˧˥ pʰaj˧]

Pan-democracy camp
- Chinese: 泛民主派
Transcriptions
Standard Mandarin
- Hanyu Pinyin: Fàn mín zhǔ pài
- Bopomofo: ㄈㄢˋ ㄇㄧㄣˊ ㄓㄨˇ ㄆㄞˋ
- Wade–Giles: Fan^{4} min^{2} chu^{3} p'ai^{4}
- IPA: [fân mǐn ʈʂù pʰâɪ]
Yue: Cantonese
- Yale Romanization: Faan màhn jyú paai
- Jyutping: Faan6 man4 zyu2 paai3
- IPA: [fan˨ mɐn˩ tsy˧˥ pʰaj˧]

The pro-democracy camp (Chinese: 民主派), also known as the pan-democracy camp, is a political alignment in Hong Kong that supports increased democracy, namely the universal suffrage of the Chief Executive and the Legislative Council as given by the Basic Law under the "One Country, Two Systems" framework.

The pro-democrats generally embrace liberal values such as rule of law, human rights, civil liberties and social justice, though their economic positions vary. They are often referred to as the "opposition camp" as they have consistently been the minority camp within the Legislative Council, and because of their non-cooperative and sometimes confrontational stance towards the Hong Kong government and Chinese Communist Party (CCP). Opposite to the pro-democracy camp is the pro-Beijing camp, whose members are perceived as being supportive of the Beijing and SAR authorities. Since the 1997 handover, the pro-democracy camp has usually received 55 to 60 percent of the votes in each election, but has always received less than half of the seats in the Legislative Council due to the indirectly elected elements of the legislature.

The pro-democracy activists emerged from the youth movements in the 1970s and began to take part in electoral politics as the colonial government introduced representative democracy in the mid-1980s. The pro-democrats joined hands in pushing for greater democracy both in the transition period and after handover of Hong Kong in 1997. Many also supported greater democracy in China and the 1989 Tiananmen Square protests. The relationship between the pro-democrats and the Beijing government turned hostile after Beijing's bloody crackdown on the protest, after which the pro-democrats were labelled as "treasonous". After the 2004 Legislative Council election, the term "pan-democracy camp" (abbreviated "pan-dems") became more commonly used as more allied parties and politicians of varying political ideologies emerged.

The camp faced a challenge in 2016 election from the new localists who emerged after the Umbrella Revolution and ran under the banner of self-determination or Hong Kong independence. After the election, some localists joined the pro-democrats' caucus, which rebranded itself as the "pro-democracy camp". The disunity within the camp and the failure of the Umbrella Revolution cost the pro-democrats in the 2018 by-elections. The 2019 anti-extradition movement, however, saw a rebound in popularity for the camp, which contributed to its biggest electoral victory in the history of Hong Kong, gaining control of 17 of the 18 District Councils and more than tripling their seats from 124 to 388 in the 2019 District Council election. In reaction to the political upheaval, the Beijing government imposed national security law to curb the opposition and disqualified four sitting pro-democracy legislators, triggering the resignations of remaining pro-democrats and rendering the bloc extra-parliamentary. Dozens of activists were arrested and jailed in the following months, most notably the Hong Kong 47. Most of the pro-democracy parties dissolved between 2020 and 2025, reportedly under pressure from the authorities. Some media outlets considered the pro-democracy camp to have come to an end when the League of Social Democrats dissolved in June 2025.

== Ideology ==
One of the main goals of the pro-democracy camp is to achieve universal suffrage of the Chief Executive (CE) and the Legislative Council (LegCo) as guaranteed in Article 45 and Article 68 of the Basic Law respectively. Since the National People's Congress Standing Committee's (NPCSC) 31 August 2014 decision, which determined that the Chief Executive candidate would be selected by a highly restrictive nominating committee and was seen as betrayal of the democratic value, some democrats have raised the question of the right to self-determination. However, the mainstream pro-democrats retained their support for a highly autonomous Hong Kong under the "One Country, Two Systems" framework, as promised by the Basic Law.

The pro-democrats generally embrace liberal values such as rule of law, human rights, civil liberties, and social justice, though their economic positions vary. Some pro-democrats position themselves as more pro-labour while most pro-democrats believe in a more meritocratic or egalitarian society. The pro-democracy camp generally supports the Chinese democracy movement, which can be traced back to their support for the Tiananmen Square protests of 1989. Many of the pro-democrats have been calling for the end of one party rule of the Chinese Communist Party and therefore are seen as a threat by the Beijing authorities. The camp's support for more liberal democracy is seen as unacceptable by the Beijing government. In some cases, pan-democracy activists have been labeled traitors (hanjian) to China.

The pro-democrats are also divided by their approach for achieving democracy: the moderate democrats, represented by the Democratic Party and the Association for Democracy and People's Livelihood (ADPL), believe in dialogue with Beijing and Hong Kong governments over struggle, while radical democrats such as the League of Social Democrats and the People Power believe in street actions and mass movements. There have been severe conflicts and distrust between the two factions and a great split after the constitutional reform voting in 2010, where the Democratic Party negotiated with the Beijing representatives and supported the modified reform proposal and was thus seen as a betrayal by the radical democrats.

== History ==
=== Early development ===
Members of the camp include social workers and social activists emerged from the 1970s youth movements. Many of them grouped themselves as the "social action faction", competing against the pro-Communist Maoists in whom they disagreed with their ultra-nationalist and radical Maoist stances. Although claiming to be patriotic and launching the defend the Diaoyu Islands movement, the "social action faction" dedicated themselves into the local social issues in Hong Kong. They fought for the social inequality and livelihood issues, including the anti-corruption movement and Chinese Language movement and so forth. In the early 1980s when the question of Hong Kong sovereignty emerged, many of them supported a democratic autonomous Hong Kong under Chinese sovereignty, notably the Meeting Point which was founded in January 1983 which became the first political group to publicly support the Chinese sovereignty of Hong Kong.

After the Sino-British Joint Declaration, the pro-democrats began to join hands to demand further democracy before and after 1997. In 1986, a number of political groups, activists, professionals and politicians joined hand under the banner of the Joint Committee on the Promotion of Democratic Government (JCPDG) demanding for 1988 direct elections for the Legislative Council and earlier universal suffrage for the Chief Executive and Legislative Council after 1997, as presented in the proposal of the Group of 190. Their arch rival at the time was the Group of 89, a group of conservative business and professional elites in the Hong Kong Basic Law Drafting Committee (HKBLDC) and Hong Kong Basic Law Consultative Committee (HKBLCC). They generally opposed the British colonial administration and its perceived "kowtowing" to the Beijing government over the issues such as constitutional reform, direct elections, civic rights and Daya Bay Nuclear Plant.

The pro-democrats maintained a relatively warm relationship with the Beijing government during the 1980s, as many of the pro-democrats supported the Chinese sovereignty in Hong Kong and the "high degree of autonomy" as ensured in the Sino-British Joint Declaration. They also saw the ideal of Hong Kong helping in China's Four Modernisations. The Beijing authorities also viewed the pro-democrats as the targets of the united front. Barrister Martin Lee and educator Szeto Wah, president of the Hong Kong Professional Teachers' Union, who were also the two most visible pro-democracy leaders, were appointed members of the Hong Kong Basic Law Drafting Committee in 1985 by Beijing.

The pro-democrats also participated in electoral politics as direct elections were introduced in local levels in the 1980s, namely the District Boards, Urban Council and Regional Council. Among them, the Meeting Point formed in 1983, the Hong Kong Affairs Society in 1985 and Association for Democracy and People's Livelihood in 1986 became the three major pro-democratic groups and formed a strategic alliance in the 1988 District Board elections, which laid the foundation of the pro-democracy grassroots supports.

=== Tiananmen protests and last colonial years ===
The consolidation of its public support has its roots in opposition to the 1989 Tiananmen crackdown which aroused widespread horror, sympathy and support of the protesters by Hong Kong citizens. The pro-democrats, who were heavily involved in the protests and formed the Hong Kong Alliance in Support of Patriotic Democratic Movements of China (ADSPDMC or Alliance), were seen as "treason" and threat to the Beijing government. The two pro-democracy Basic Law Drafting Committee members, Martin Lee and Szeto Wah, were stripped from the office after they resigned in protest of the bloody crackdown, many of other pro-democrats were denied entry to the mainland China since. Since 1989, the Alliance organise annual candlelight vigil for the June 4 crackdown at the Victoria Park, Hong Kong, which draw thousands of people every year. Ahead of the first direct election to the Legislative Council in 1991, around 600 democracy activists co-founded the first major pro-democracy party, the United Democrats of Hong Kong.

The electoral alliance of United Democrats of Hong Kong and Meeting Point, together with other smaller political parties, groups and independents, won a historical landslide victory in the 1991 election, took 17 out of the 18 geographical constituency seats. The pro-democrats were often considered strategic allies of Chris Patten, the last colonial governor who proposed a much progressive democratic reform in the last years before the handover of Hong Kong, despite Beijing's strong opposition. The Democrats supported Patten's proposal for the 1995 Legislative Council election. However, Emily Lau's full-scale direct election amendment was not passed as a result of Meeting Point's abstaining from voting for Emily Lau, which caused harsh criticism from the radical democrats and the United Ants. In 1994, the United Democrats and the Meeting Point merged into the Democratic Party, which won another landslide victory in the 1995 election, taking 19 seats in total, far ahead of other parties. Together with other democratic parties and individuals including Emily Lau, Lee Cheuk-yan and Leung Yiu-chung who later formed The Frontier in 1996 and Christine Loh who formed the Citizens Party in 1997, the pro-democrats gained a thin majority in the legislature for the last two years before 1997.

The Beijing government argued that the electoral reform introduced by Patten had violated the Joint Declaration and thus they no longer felt obliged to honour the promise of a "through train", a plan to keep the 1995 elected legislature into post-handover SAR era. A parallel Legislative Council, the Provisional Legislative Council, was formed in 1996 under the control of the Pro-Beijing camp, this became the Legislative Council upon the founding of the new SAR government in 1997, in which the pro-democrats except for the Association for Democracy and People's Livelihood boycotted it, deeming it as unconstitutional.

=== Handover to China and 1 July 2003 protest ===
All of its members, except the Association for Democracy and People's Livelihood, declined to join the extralegal Provisional Legislative Council installed by the government of the People's Republic of China, and were ousted from the territory's legislature for a year until the 1998 election. Starting from the 1998 election, since the plurality electoral system was changed to proportional representation, compounded with the restoration of corporate votes in the functional constituencies, and replacement of broad-based functional constituencies with traditional ones, the number of seats of the camp dipped, albeit having similar share of vote. Within the camp, share of smaller parties and independents increased relatively, with the share of the Democratic Party falling from around two-thirds in 1995 to less than a half by 2004.

The pro-democracy camp was the strong opposition to the national security and anti-subversion legislation of the Basic Law Article 23 and they successfully called for over 500,000 people to protest on 1 July 2003 against the legislation, the largest demonstration since the handover. The pro-democrats received victories in the subsequent 2003 District Councils and 2004 Legislative Council elections. The barrister-formed Article 23 Concern Group formed by the pro-democracy lawyers, which transformed into Article 45 Concern Group, saw its member Audrey Eu, Alan Leong and Ronny Tong were elected in the 2004 election. In 2006, the group formed the middle class and professional oriented Civic Party. On the other hand, the left-wing radical group League of Social Democrats was formed in the same year by Trotskyist legislator Leung Kwok-hung and radical radio host Wong Yuk-man. As a result of the diversification of the pro-democracy elements, the use of "pan-democrats" gained in popularity, as it is typically meant to be non-denominational and all-inclusive.

In the 2007 Chief Executive election, Civic Party's Alan Leong successfully gained enough nominations to challenge the incumbent Chief Executive Donald Tsang, but he was not elected as expected due to the control of the Election Committee by the pro-Beijing camp. After the 2008 Legislative Council election, The Frontier merged into the Democratic Party and the convenor Emily Lau was elected vice chair of the party.

=== 2012 reform package and the Split ===
Donald Tsang, the Chief Executive, promised to resolve the question of universal suffrage in his office during the election. He carried out the 2012 constitutional package in 2009 which was criticised by the pro-democracy as lack of genuine progress. The League of Social Democrats called for a de facto referendum, by way of the 2010 by-elections in five geographical constituencies. Civic Party, the second largest pro-democratic party joined, however the Democratic Party, the largest party, was reluctant to participate. The Democratic Party and other moderate democrats and pro-democracy scholars launched the Alliance for Universal Suffrage and started to engage with the mainland officials. The Democratic Party brought out a revised proposal of the package to Beijing and the revised proposal was passed in the Legislative Council in the support of the government and Pro-Beijing camp.

However, it triggered a major split within the camp and also in the Democratic Party. The Young Turks including the LegCo member Andrew Cheng quit the party and formed the Neo Democrats. The Democratic Party was accused by the LSD and the radicals of betraying democracy and its supporters. On the matter of whether to coordinate with the moderate democrats in the 2011 District Council elections, the League of Social Democrats was suffered in the factional fighting and two of the three LSD legislators left the party in disarray and formed the People Power. The People Power's campaign targeted pan-democracy parties in the 2011 District Council elections that had supported the reform package filled candidates to run against them but only won one seat of 62 contested.

Nevertheless, the People Power managed to win three seats in the 2012 Legislative Council election and the radical democrats of the (People Power and the League of Social Democrats) topped 264,000 votes, compared to the Civic Party's 255,000 and Democratic Party's 247,000 respectively. Despite the pan-democrats securing three of the five newly created, District Council (second) constituency seats the ratio of the vote share between the pan-democrats and the pro-Beijing camp narrowed significantly from the traditional 60% to 40%, to 55% to 45%.

The chairman of the Democratic Party Albert Ho represented the pan-democracy camp to run in the 2012 Chief Executive election. On election day the pan-democrats declined to vote for neither Henry Tang nor Leung Chun-ying and called for a blank vote from the electors.

=== 2014 Umbrella Revolution ===
In March 2013, all 27 democratic legislators formed the Alliance for True Democracy (ATD), replacing the Alliance for Universal Suffrage, to show solidarity of the camp to fight for genuine democracy. The ATD put forward a three-channel proposal for the 2017 Chief Executive election during the constitutional reform consultation in 2014. However, the decision of the National People's Congress Standing Committee (NPCSC) on 31 August ruled out the possibility for any candidate not endorsed by Beijing to be nominated for the election, which the pan-democrats accused as a betrayal of the principle of "one person, one vote," The pan-democrats had supported legal scholar Benny Tai's Occupy Central plan of civil disobedience against Beijing's decision, which later turned into a 79-day occupy protest which often dubbed as "Umbrella Revolution". On 18 June 2015, all 27 pan-democrat legislators and Medical legislator Leung Ka-lau voted against the government's constitutional reform bill while the pro-Beijing legislators launched a failed walk-out. The bill was defeated by 28 against 8 for, barely meeting the quorum of 35.

Many new political groups emerged from the Umbrella Revolution often distanced themselves from the pan-democrats. Many of whom, being labelled as "localists", criticised pan-democrats' failing in achieving democracy in the last 30 years. Many of them called for more "militant" tactics over pan-democrats' "non-violent" principles and "China–Hong Kong separation" over the some mainstream pan-democrats' mild "Chinese nationalist sentiment". Some of them also criticised pan-democrats' demand of the vindication of the 1989 Tiananmen protests, as pursued by the Hong Kong Alliance in Support of Patriotic Democratic Movements of China (HKASPDMC). There was also growing voice for Hong Kong independence from the Chinese rule, as many of whom deemed the "One Country, Two Systems" had failed.

=== Continued division and anti-extradition protests ===
In the 2016 Legislative Council election, localist camp with different banners together took away 19 per cent of the vote share from the pan-democrats, in which the traditional pan-democrats secured only 36 per cent, 21 less than the previous election. The non-establishment forces secured 30 out of the 70 seats, in which pan-democrats took 23 seats. After the election, the 27-member pro-democrats' caucus rebranded themselves into "pro-democracy camp" or "G27", as three backers of the "self-determination" of Hong Kong, namely Nathan Law, Lau Siu-lai and Eddie Chu joined the caucus. The "G27" soon became "G26" after Chu left the caucus shortly afterwards.

In the 2016 Election Committee subsector election, the pro-democrat coalition "Democrats 300+" scored a record victory in the Election Committee which was responsible for electing the 2017 Chief Executive. The democrats decided not to field their candidate in order to boost the chance of an alternative establishment candidate against incumbent Leung Chun-ying. After Leung announced he would not seek for re-election, the pro-democrats turned against Chief Secretary for Administration Carrie Lam who was seen as "C.Y. 2.0". The pro-democrats nominated former Financial Secretary John Tsang and retired judge Woo Kwok-hing amid the Liaison Office actively lobbied for Lam. Ahead of the election, some 98 per cent of the "Democrats 300+" coalition decided on voting for Tsang as he was the most popular candidate in the polls.

On 14 July 2017, Leung Kwok-hung of the League of Social Democrats, Nathan Law of the Demosisto, Yiu Chung-yim and Lau Siu-lai were unseated from the Legislative Council over their manners at the oath-taking ceremony at the inaugural meeting as a result of the legal action from the Leung Chun-ying government and the interpretation of the Hong Kong Basic Law by the National People's Congress Standing Committee (NPCSC), following the disqualification of two pro-independence legislators, Youngspiration's Baggio Leung and Yau Wai-ching.

The pro-democrats suffered a defeat in the by-election for four of the six vacancies on 11 March 2018, losing the Kowloon West geographical constituency and Architectural, Surveying, Planning and Landscape functional constituency to the pro-Beijing candidates. Yiu Ching-yim who contested in Kowloon West was defeated by Vincent Cheng of the DAB with a thin margin, making it the first time a pro-democrat lost in a single-member district election since the handover. The vote share of the pro-democrats also dropped from the traditional 55 per cent to only 47 per cent.

The pro-democrats fiercely opposed the amendment to the extradition law in 2019 which they feared the erosion of Hong Kong's legal system and its built-in safeguards. The opposition led to the historic massive protests throughout the latter half of the year. Riding on the anti-government sentiments, the pro-democracy camp achieved its biggest landslide victory in the history of Hong Kong in the 2019 District Council election, gaining control of 17 of the 18 District Councils and tripling their seats from around 124 to about 388. The pro-democrats were also able to capture 117 District Council subsector seats in the 1,200-member Election Committee, which is responsible for electing the Chief Executive of Hong Kong. Pro-Beijing parties and independents won from around 300 to only 62 seats, losing nearly 80 per cent of the seats.

=== 2020 mass resignations from legislature ===
The Hong Kong national security law promulgated by the NPCSC in June 2020 gave sweeping power to the Hong Kong government to suppress the opposition. In the subsequently-postponed Legislative Council election of September 2020, 12 pro-democracy and localist candidates were disqualified by the returning officers for breaching the national security law, including three Civic Party incumbent legislators Alvin Yeung, Kwok Ka-ki and Dennis Kwok, as well as Kenneth Leung. The pro-democracy camp was divided over whether to stay for the extended legislative term or to quit, as they deemed the disqualifications to be unlawful. In the end, 19 of the 22 pro-democrats remained in the Legislative Council.

In November 2020, the NPCSC applied the national security law to disqualify the four sitting legislators whose candidacies were previously invalidated. In response, the pro-democrat convenor and Democratic Party chairman Wu Chi-wai announced the remaining 15 pro-democracy legislators were to resign en masse in protest to the decision, declaring the death of the "One Country, Two Systems" and separation of power in Hong Kong. The mass resignations left virtually no opposition in the Legislative Council. Cheng Chung-tai, the legislator from localist Civic Passion, and nonpartisan Pierre Chan remained as the only members that were not aligned with the pro-Beijing camp. They both voted against the electoral revamp that was widely criticised as democratic backsliding. Cheng was disqualified in 2021 and Chan stood down at the legislature's dissolution later that year.

=== End of political participation ===
In January 2021, 55 pro-democracy activists or allies were arrested, including grandees of several pro-democracy parties, and subsequently charged for subversion over the pro-democracy primaries a year earlier. The case became known as that of the Hong Kong 47 and was considered to be a major blow against the camp. Several parties dissolved later, including Neo Democrats, Civic Party, and, amongst them the largest, the Democratic Party. On 29 June 2025, the League of Social Democrats, the last active party of the pro-democracy camp, also ended their operations amidst pressure. Since then, the pro-democracy camp has been considered to have come to an end. Ronny Tong, a member of the Executive Council and a former democrat, said in June 2025 a "new pro-democracy camp" could start over from scratch.

The Neighbourhood and Worker's Service Centre no longer continues their work as a political advocacy group or as a political party, though remains active. The Hong Kong Association for Democracy and People's Livelihood, which tried to run in the 2023 Hong Kong local elections but failed, is also active.

In October 2025, research work conducted by Francis L. F. Lee, Gary K. Y. Tang and Chi-Kit Chan suggests that potential participants who are not able to protest as part of social mobilization due to the NSL are orienting their activities through "suspended post-materialism" by reprioritizing basic needs while maintaining non-material values. It also suggested that young people in Hong Kong are keeping these values active on a personal level like equality, equity, and social justice so that they can survive and evolve on an individualized or community basis.

== Convenor ==
A caucus-like mechanism, without whips, was established on 8 October 2004 and was then known as "Lunchbox Conference", as legislators discussed local and political issues during luncheon on every Fridays. The convenor was the nominal leader of the camp but did not contain any real powers. It was renamed as "Pro-Democracy Camp Meetings" after 2016 election. The conference ceased to function after en masse resignations in 2020.

Convenor of Pro-Democracy Camp Meetings
| Portrait | Convenor | Constituency | Took office | Left office | Party | LegCo | Ref |
|---|---|---|---|---|---|---|---|
| | Cyd Ho | Hong Kong Island | 8 October 2004 | 5 October 2012 | Civic Act-up | 3rd | |
| | Cyd Ho | Hong Kong Island | 8 October 2004 | 5 October 2012 | Civic Act-up | 4th | |
| | Cyd Ho | Hong Kong Island | 8 October 2004 | 5 October 2012 | Labour | 4th | |
| | Emily Lau | New Territories East | 5 October 2012 | September 2013 | Democratic | 5th | |
| | Frederick Fung | District Council (Second) | September 2013 | 15 September 2014 | ADPL | 5th | |
| | Alan Leong | Kowloon East | 16 September 2014 | 9 September 2015 | Civic | 5th | |
| | Cyd Ho | Hong Kong Island | 10 September 2015 | 28 September 2016 | Labour | 5th | |
| | James To | District Council (Second) | 28 September 2016 | 25 August 2017 | Democratic | 6th | |
| | Charles Mok | Information Technology | 25 August 2017 | 9 July 2018 | Prof Commons | 6th | |
| | Claudia Mo | Kowloon West | 9 July 2018 | 28 September 2019 | HK First | 6th | |
| | Tanya Chan | Hong Kong Island | 28 September 2019 | 29 September 2020 | Civic | 6th | |
| | Wu Chi-wai | Kowloon East | 29 September 2020 | 30 November 2020 | Democratic | 6th | |

== Members ==
This list includes the major political parties and groups in Hong Kong:

=== Current ===
Political parties and groups with limited activities:

- Neighbourhood and Worker's Service Centre (1985–), a small pro-grassroots group and party based in Kwai Chung. Leung Yiu-chung was its sole legislator since 1995 until 2020. It is no longer focused on political advocacy.
- Hong Kong Association for Democracy and People's Livelihood (1986–), a political party catering to grassroots interest with a strong basis in Sham Shui Po. It was one of the three major pro-democracy groups along with the Meeting Point and the Hong Kong Affairs Society in the 1980s.

=== No longer active ===
The following parties are no longer active:

- Professional Commons (2007–), a professional-based group which consists of pro-democracy legislators elected through the professional functional constituencies.
- Labour Party (2011–), a social democratic party founded by veteran politician Lee Cheuk-yan of the Hong Kong Confederation of Trade Unions (CTU) in 2012.
- HK First (2013–), a localist party that was initially established in 2013 as a parliamentary group in the LegCo and led by Claudia Mo.

The following protest or civic groups are no longer active:

- April Fifth Action, no longer active
- Democracy Groundwork, no longer active
- Socialist Action (Hong Kong), no longer active

=== Dissolved ===
Dissolved political parties:

- Civic Party (2006–2023), a professional-based party founded mostly by barristers of Article 45 Concern Group who rose to fame in the anti-Article 23 legislation. It overtook the Democratic Party in popular votes in the geographical constituencies of the 2016 Legislative Council election and was considered the second largest party.
- Democratic Alliance (2003–2021), the sole party in the pro-ROC camp with elected representatives after the dissolution of the 123 Democratic Alliance and chaired by Johnny Mak.
- Demosisto (2016–2020), a pro-democracy party led by Joshua Wong, Agnes Chow and Nathan Law. The group played an instrumental role in the 79-day Umbrella Revolution in 2014.
- Democratic Party (1994–2025), the flagship pro-democracy party that succeeded the United Democrats of Hong Kong, which won a landslide victory in the 1991 first-ever direct elections of the Legislative Council. It was founded in 1990 as a grand alliance of the pro-democracy activists from all sectors and was further merged with the Meeting Point in 1994. It positioned itself as centrist and liberal.
- League of Social Democrats (2006–2025), a left-wing party that broke away from the Democratic Party, positioning itself as the radical wing of the pro-democracy camp and stresses on "street actions" and "parliamentary struggles".
- Neo Democrats (2010–2021), a breakaway group from the Democratic Party which carries a moderate localist agenda. Its stronghold was in the New Territories East where it returned its sole legislator Gary Fan who won in the 2018 by-election.
- People Power (2011–2025), a localist radical democratic group backed by businessman Stephen Shiu and formed as a breakaway group from the League of Social Democrats, citing disagreements with the party stance on the Democratic Party's compromise with the Beijing government on the 2010 Hong Kong electoral reform. It suffered a split in 2013 when Civic Passion was formed.

Dissolved major unions:

- Hong Kong Confederation of Trade Unions (1990–2021), a labour and political group in the Hong Kong which once had 160,000 members in 61 affiliates. It was one of the two most influential labour groups in Hong Kong, with the other one being the pro-Beijing Hong Kong Federation of Trade Unions.
  - Hong Kong Professional Teachers' Union (1973–2021), the largest single-industry trade union in Hong Kong and a teachers' union traditionally friendly with the pro-democracy camp
- Hong Kong Federation of Students (1958–2026), a student organization representing student unions generally aligned with the pro-democracy camp

Dissolved alliances:

- Alliance for True Democracy (2013–2021), an alliance of Legislative Council members
- Civil Human Rights Front (2002–2021), a civic group that organised mass pro-democracy protests
- Hong Kong Alliance in Support of Patriotic Democratic Movements of China (1989–2021), a civic group supported democratisation of China and succeeded the Joint Committee on the Promotion of Democratic Government
- Power for Democracy (2002–2021), an electoral platform for pro-democracy parties

== Electoral performance ==
=== Chief Executive elections ===
| Election | Candidate | Party | Votes | % |
|---|---|---|---|---|
| 1996 | Did not contest | | | |
| 2002 | Did not contest | | | |
| 2005 | Lee Wing-tat | Democratic | Not nominated | |
| 2007 | Alan Leong | Civic | 123 | 15.93 |
| 2012 | Albert Ho | Democratic | 76 | 7.24 |
| 2017 | Leung Kwok-hung (Note: Not endorsed by mainstream pro-democrats.) | LSD | Not nominated | |
| 2022 | Did not contest | | | |

=== Legislative Council elections ===
| Election | Number of popular votes | % of popular votes | GC seats | FC seats | EC seats | Total seats | +/− | Status |
|---|---|---|---|---|---|---|---|---|
| 1991 | 843,888 (Note: Each voter was given two votes in the 1991 election.) | 61.63 | 16 | 7 | − | 20 / 60 | 13▲ | —N/a |
| 1995 | 557,515 | 61.13▼ | 16 | 10 | 3 | 29 / 60 | 11▲ | —N/a |
| 1998 | 982,249▲ | 66.36▲ | 15 | 5 | 0 | 20 / 60 | —N/a | Minority |
| 2000 | 799,249▼ | 60.56▼ | 16 | 5 | 0 | 21 / 60 | 1▲ | Minority |
| 2004 | 1,105,388▲ | 62.44▲ | 18 | 7 | | 25 / 60 | 3▲ | Minority |
| 2008 | 901,707▼ | 59.50▼ | 19 | 4 | | 23 / 60 | 3▼ | Minority |
| 2012 | 1,036,998▲ | 57.26▼ | 18 | 9 | | 27 / 70 | 4▲ | Minority |
| 2016 | 781,168▼ | 36.02▼ | 13 | 10 | | 23 / 70 | 3▼ | Minority |
| 2021 | Did not contest | | 0 | 0 | 0 | 0 / 90 | 0 | Extra-parliamentary |
| 2025 | Did not contest | | 0 | 0 | 0 | 0 / 90 | 0 | Extra-parliamentary |

=== Municipal elections ===
| Election | Number of popular votes | % of popular votes | UrbCo seats | RegCo seats | Total elected seats |
|---|---|---|---|---|---|
| 1989 | 68,831 | 32.38 | 5 / 15 | 5 / 12 | 10 / 27 |
| 1991 | 200,877▲ | 51.28▲ | 6 / 15 | 7 / 12 | 14 / 27 |
| 1995 | 287,226▲ | 51.51▲ | 18 / 32 | 16 / 27 | 34 / 59 |

=== District Council elections ===
| Election | Number of popular votes | % of popular votes | Total elected seats | +/− |
|---|---|---|---|---|
| 1988 | 139,982 | 22.16 | 61 / 264 | 24▲ |
| 1991 | 170,757▲ | 32.11▲ | 83 / 272 | 22▲ |
| 1994 | 280,707▲ | 40.89▲ | 146 / 346 | 48▲ |
| 1999 | 325,829▲ | 40.18▼ | 157 / 390 | 22▲ |
| 2003 | 477,596▲ | 45.54▲ | 198 / 400 | 38▲ |
| 2007 | 445,781▼ | 39.15▼ | 127 / 405 | 56▼ |
| 2011 | 464,512▲ | 39.34▲ | 103 / 412 | 16▼ |
| 2015 | 581,058▲ | 40.20▲ | 126 / 431 | 25▲ |
| 2019 | 1,674,083▲ | 57.10▲ | 388 / 452 | 265▲ |
| 2023 | N/A | N/A | 0 / 470 | 388▼ |

== See also ==
- Jimmy Lai
- Liberalism in Hong Kong
- Localism in Hong Kong
- Socialism in Hong Kong
- Pro-democracy camp (Macau)
- Pro-democracy movement (Myanmar)
- Pro-ROC camp
- Centrist camp
