= Hong Kong Professional Teachers' Union =

Defunct union of the teaching profession in Hong Kong

- 香港教育專業人員協會
- Founded: 1973
- Founder: Szeto Wah
- Dissolved: 11 September 2021
- Location: Hong Kong
- Members: 95,000
- President: Fung Wai-wah (final)
- Parent organization: Hong Kong Confederation of Trade Unions
- Affiliations: Pro-democracy camp
- Website: www.hkptu.org.hk

Hong Kong Professional Teachers' Union
- Traditional Chinese: 香港教育專業人員協會
- Simplified Chinese: 香港教育专业人员协会
Transcriptions
Standard Mandarin
- Hanyu Pinyin: Xiānggǎng Jiàoyù Zhuānyè Rényuán Xiéhuì
Yue: Cantonese
- Yale Romanization: Hēung góng gaau yuhk jyūn yihp yàhn yùhn hip wuih
- Jyutping: Hoeng^{1} gong^{2} gaau^{3} juk^{6} zyun^{1} jip^{6} jan^{4} jyun^{4} hip^{3} wui^{6*2}

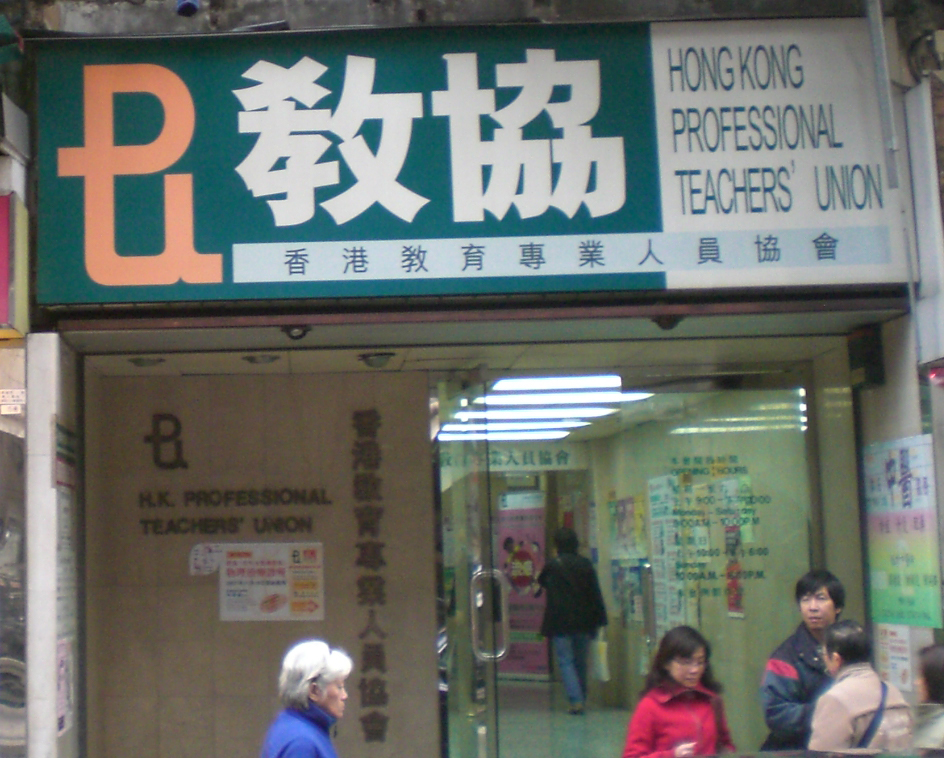
Wan Chai Office of HKPTU

The Hong Kong Professional Teachers' Union (HKPTU) was a pro-democracy trade union, professional association and social concern group in Hong Kong. At the time of its disbandment in 2021, it was the largest single-profession trade union in Hong Kong with over 95,000 members, also making it the largest teachers' organisation in Hong Kong, representing over 90 per cent of the profession.

== Mission ==
The PTU was known to be politically liberal, socially activist, and concerned with the defence of the legal rights of teachers. It also traditionally lobbied for student-oriented educational reforms and for wider democracy in Hong Kong.

== Structure ==
The highest authority of the PTU was the Annual General Meeting, which was attended by members' representatives, who were elected by teachers in every school, at a ratio of 1 representative to 15 members. When the Annual General Meeting was not in session, a 39-member Executive Committee ran the day-to-day affairs of the union. A 19-member Senate monitors the Executive Committee's work. Both the Executive Committee and the Senate were directly elected by all members of the union in the form of one-person-one-vote. All votes were confidential. At the time of its disbandment, the president of the union was Fung Wai-wah.

== History ==
The PTU was founded in response to the cut in salaries of certificated teachers by 15% in 1973. It launched the certificated teachers' strike and became an influential force in Hong Kong.

During the 1970s the PTU repeatedly challenged the government and on some occasions forced it to make concessions. During the Golden Jubilee Secondary School Incident in 1978, which was triggered by alleged corruption in a secondary school, the school was shut down by the Education Department after 900 students and teachers organised a sit-in to protest financial irregularities.; 16 of the school's teachers were dismissed. Through the efforts of the HKPTU, all the teachers won reinstatement. Through this incident, the PTU demonstrated its status as the most powerful pressure group in Hong Kong.

On 12 December 1980, the British journalist Duncan Campbell revealed the existence of the Standing Committee on Pressure Groups (SCOPG) in an article in the New Statesman. The SCOPG was set up by the Hong Kong government to increase its control over the opposition groups under secret surveillance; the PTU appeared on the list. On 28 January 1981, the Hong Kong Standard revealed, according to some confidential reports, that the government has listed the PTU on a "Red List" of groups were supposedly at risk of Communist infiltration.

The PTU has held the Education functional constituency in the Legislative Council of Hong Kong since its creation in 1985. In the 1985 LegCo election, the founding president Szeto Wah was elected to the Legislative Council from the Teaching constituency and was re-elected in 1988 LegCo election. In the 1985 District Board elections, the PTU reportedly won 24 seats. By the late 1980s the PTU was the largest single union in Hong Kong with over 32,000 members. President Szeto Wah remained the key figure of the PTU even after he stepped down as president in 1990 and remained active in the political arena until his death.

The PTU participated in the anti-Daya Bay Nuclear Plant campaign in 1986. In the same year, the PTU initiated the Joint Committee on the Promotion of Democratic Government (JCPDG) which demanded the constitutional reform for the direct election in 1987. The PTU participated a public gathering in Victoria Park in support of the direct election of the Legislative Council, advocating a democratic political system instead of the system in which the legislators where appointed by the governor.

During the Tiananmen protests of 1989, the PTU, together with the 14 other member organisations of the JCPDG, issued a public statement in support of the pro-democracy student-led movement in May and established the Hong Kong Alliance in Support of Patriotic Democratic Movements of China. The PTU has remained the core member of the alliance.

In 1990 Szeto Wah co-founded the pro-democracy party United Democrats of Hong Kong which later merged with the Meeting Point into the Democratic Party. In the first LegCo direct election in 1991, Szeto Wah contested in Kowloon East and Cheung Man-kwong, the PTU president and also United Democrats member, ran for the Teaching constituency.

In 1994, in response to pressure from the PTU, the Education Department agreed to subsidise the salaries of teachers in all non-profit making kindergartens. At the same time, funding was provided to expand training programs to ensure most kindergarten teachers would be given the chance to receive training to become qualified.

Szeto Wah retired from the Legislative Council in 2004 and Cheung Man-kwong retired from the Education constituency in 2012. PTU member Ip Kin-yuen became the PTU representative in LegCo since the 2012 LegCo election.

On 31 July 2021, Chinese state media People's Daily and Xinhua News Agency published articles accusing the PTU of "encouraging anti-China activities that mess up Hong Kong", calling it a "poisonous tumour" that "must be eradicated". Hours after, the Education Bureau announced that it would stop working with the PTU, accusing it of "spreading political propaganda" and "dragging schools into politics".

On 10 August 2021, PTU president Fung Wai-wah announced in a press conference that the PTU would disband. He added that the trade union had tried hard to find ways to continue its operations, but that "the social and political situation changed too fast and too quickly" and the decision to disband was made in response to these changes. In a letter to members dated 10 November 2023, the PTU announced that it had completed regulatory audits and tax-related matters and was to disburse remaining assets to qualified members.

== Presidents ==
- Szeto Wah, 1974–1990
- Cheung Man Kwong, 1990–2010
- Fung Wai-wah, 2010–2021
