= List of constituencies of Hong Kong =

This is a list of constituencies of Hong Kong. There are currently ten geographical constituencies and 28 functional constituencies that elect 50 out of 90 members to the Legislative Council of Hong Kong. The structure of both constituency categories has undergone major changes throughout their history.

== Legislative Council ==
=== Geographical constituencies ===
Geographical constituencies (GC) were first introduced in Hong Kong's first legislative election with direct elections in 1991. The following table charts the evolution of geographical constituencies of the LegCo:

	1991	1995	1998	2000	2004	2008	2012	2016	2021
GCs	Hong Kong Island East	Hong Kong Island Central	Hong Kong Island (LC1)						Hong Kong Island East
GCs	Hong Kong Island East	Hong Kong Island East	Hong Kong Island (LC1)						Hong Kong Island East
GCs	Hong Kong Island East	Hong Kong Island South	Hong Kong Island (LC1)						Hong Kong Island East
GCs	Hong Kong Island West	Hong Kong Island South	Hong Kong Island (LC1)						Hong Kong Island West
GCs	Hong Kong Island West	Hong Kong Island West	Hong Kong Island (LC1)						Hong Kong Island West
GCs	Kowloon East	Kowloon East	Kowloon East (LC3)						Kowloon East
GCs	Kowloon East	Kowloon South-east	Kowloon East (LC3)						Kowloon East
GCs	Kowloon Central	Kowloon North-east	Kowloon East (LC3)						Kowloon East
GCs	Kowloon Central	Kowloon North-east	Kowloon East (LC3)						Kowloon Central
GCs	Kowloon Central	Kowloon Central	Kowloon East (LC3)						Kowloon Central
GCs	Kowloon Central	Kowloon Central	Kowloon West (LC2)						Kowloon Central
GCs	Kowloon Central	Kowloon South	Kowloon West (LC2)						Kowloon Central
GCs	Kowloon Central	Kowloon South-west	Kowloon West (LC2)						Kowloon West
GCs	Kowloon West	Kowloon South-west	Kowloon West (LC2)						Kowloon West
GCs	Kowloon West	Kowloon West	Kowloon West (LC2)						Kowloon West
GCs	New Territories East	New Territories East	New Territories East (LC5)						New Territories South East
GCs	New Territories East	New Territories East	New Territories East (LC5)						New Territories North East
GCs	New Territories East	New Territories South-east	New Territories East (LC5)						New Territories North East
GCs	New Territories North	New Territories North-east	New Territories East (LC5)						New Territories North East
GCs	New Territories North	New Territories North	New Territories East (LC5)						New Territories North
GCs	New Territories South	New Territories North	New Territories West (LC4)						New Territories North
GCs	New Territories South	New Territories North-west	New Territories West (LC4)						New Territories North
GCs	New Territories South	New Territories North-west	New Territories West (LC4)						New Territories North West
GCs	New Territories South	New Territories West	New Territories West (LC4)						New Territories North West
GCs	New Territories South	New Territories Central	New Territories West (LC4)						New Territories North West
GCs	New Territories West	New Territories Central	New Territories West (LC4)						New Territories South West
GCs	New Territories West	New Territories South	New Territories West (LC4)						New Territories South West
GCs	New Territories West	New Territories South-west	New Territories West (LC4)						New Territories South West
GCs	New Territories West	New Territories South-west	New Territories West (LC4)						Hong Kong Island West

=== Functional constituencies ===
Functional constituencies (FC) were first introduced in Hong Kong's first legislative election in 1985. The following table charts the evolution of functional constituencies of the LegCo:

	1985	1988	1991	1995	1998	2000	2004	2008	2012	2016	2021
FCs	Urban Council (Electoral College)		Urban Council FC			District Council FC			District Council (First) FC		—N/a
FCs	Regional Council (Electoral College)		Regional Council FC			District Council FC			District Council (First) FC		—N/a
FCs	Commercial (First) FC										
FCs	Commercial (Second) FC										
FCs	Industrial (First) FC										
FCs	Industrial (Second) FC										
FCs	Finance FC										
FCs	Labour FC										
FCs	Social Services FC (1985–95) / Social Welfare FC (1995-)										
FCs	Teaching FC (1985–95) / Education FC (1995-)										
FCs	Legal FC										
FCs	Engineering, Architectural, Surveying and Planning FC		Architectural, Surveying and Planning FC (1991–2016) / Architectural, Surveying, Planning & Landscape FC (2016-)								
FCs	Engineering, Architectural, Surveying and Planning FC		Engineering FC (1991-)								
FCs	Medical FC										Medical and Health Services FC (with the Chinese Medicine sector included as electorate)
FCs	—N/a	Health Care FC (1988–95) / Health Services FC (1995-2022)									Medical and Health Services FC (with the Chinese Medicine sector included as electorate)
FCs	—N/a										Medical and Health Services FC (with the Chinese Medicine sector included as electorate)
FCs	—N/a	Accountancy FC									
FCs	—N/a		Real Estate and Construction FC								
FCs	—N/a		Tourism FC								
FCs	—N/a		Financial Services								
FCs	—N/a		Rural FC (1991–97) / Heung Yee Kuk FC (1998-)								
FCs	—N/a			Agriculture, Fisheries, Mining, Energy and Construction FC	Agriculture and Fisheries FC						
FCs	—N/a			Agriculture, Fisheries, Mining, Energy and Construction FC	—N/a						
FCs	—N/a			Textiles and Garment FC	Textiles and Garment FC (Restricted Suffrage)						
FCs	—N/a			Manufacturing FC	—N/a						
FCs	—N/a			Import and Export FC	Import and Export FC (Restricted Suffrage)						
FCs	—N/a			Wholesale and Retail FC	Wholesale and Retail FC (Restricted Suffrage)						
FCs	—N/a			Hotels and Catering FC	—N/a	Catering FC					
FCs	—N/a			Hotels and Catering FC	—N/a						
FCs	—N/a			Transport and Communication FC	Transport FC						
FCs	—N/a			Transport and Communication FC	—N/a						
FCs	—N/a			Financing, Insurance, Real Estate and Business Services FC	Insurance FC						
FCs	—N/a			Financing, Insurance, Real Estate and Business Services FC	—N/a						
FCs	—N/a			Community, Social and Personal Services FC	—N/a						
FCs	—N/a				Sports, Performing Arts, Culture and Publication FC						
FCs	—N/a				Information Technology FC						Technology and Innovation FC
FCs	—N/a										Technology and Innovation FC
FCs	—N/a										HK Deputies to NPC, Members of CPPCC, and Rep. of Relevant National Organisations FC

=== Electoral colleges ===
==== 1985-1991 ====
12 electoral colleges were established to return unofficial members of the Legislative Council in the 1985 and 1988 Legislative Council elections, composed of members of district boards and municipal councils:

- Hong Kong Island East
- Hong Kong Island West
- Kwun Tong
- Wong Tai Sin
- Kowloon City
- South Kowloon
- Sham Shui Po
- New Territories East
- New Territories West
- New Territories South
- Urban Council
- Regional Council

==== 1995 ====
In the 1995 Legislative Council election, 10 seats were returned through the Election Committee, composed of elected members of district boards.

==== 1998–2004; 2021-present ====
In the 1998 and 2000 Legislative Council elections, 10 and 6 seats were returned through the Election Committee Constituency respectively. Most of the 800 Election Committee members were elected by voters who were eligible to vote in the functional constituencies. The Election Committee Constituency has been re-established since the 2021 election, returning 40 seats.

== Municipal Councils ==
=== Urban Council ===
	1888-1936	1936-1983	1983-1995	1995
Elected; Seats	(1 territory-wide constituency)		Central & Western	Western
Elected; Seats	(1 territory-wide constituency)		Central & Western	Central
Elected; Seats	(1 territory-wide constituency)		Wan Chai	Wan Chai West
Elected; Seats	(1 territory-wide constituency)		Wan Chai	Wan Chai East
Elected; Seats	(1 territory-wide constituency)		North Point; Shau Kei Wan	North Point West
Elected; Seats	(1 territory-wide constituency)		North Point; Shau Kei Wan	North Point East
Elected; Seats	(1 territory-wide constituency)		North Point; Shau Kei Wan	Quarry Bay
Elected; Seats	(1 territory-wide constituency)		North Point; Shau Kei Wan	Shau Kei Wan
Elected; Seats	(1 territory-wide constituency)		North Point; Shau Kei Wan	Chai Wan West
Elected; Seats	(1 territory-wide constituency)		North Point; Shau Kei Wan	Chai Wan East
Elected; Seats	(1 territory-wide constituency)		Southern	Aberdeen and Bays Area
Elected; Seats	(1 territory-wide constituency)		Southern	Ap Lei Chau
Elected; Seats	(1 territory-wide constituency)		Southern	Pokfulam and Wah Fu
Elected; Seats	(1 territory-wide constituency)		Yau Ma Tei	Yau Tsim
Elected; Seats	(1 territory-wide constituency)		Mong Kok	Mong Kok
Elected; Seats	(1 territory-wide constituency)		Sham Shui Po East; Sham Shui Po West	Sham Shui Po West
Elected; Seats	(1 territory-wide constituency)		Sham Shui Po East; Sham Shui Po West	Sham Shui Po Central
Elected; Seats	(1 territory-wide constituency)		Sham Shui Po East; Sham Shui Po West	Sham Shui Po East
Elected; Seats	(1 territory-wide constituency)		Kowloon City West; Kowloon City East	Kowloon City North
Elected; Seats	(1 territory-wide constituency)		Kowloon City West; Kowloon City East	Kowloon City East
Elected; Seats	(1 territory-wide constituency)		Kowloon City West; Kowloon City East	Kowloon City South
Elected; Seats	(1 territory-wide constituency)		Kowloon City West; Kowloon City East	Kowloon City West
Elected; Seats	(1 territory-wide constituency)		Wong Tai Sin North; Wong Tai Sin South	Wang Tung and Lok Tin
Elected; Seats	(1 territory-wide constituency)		Wong Tai Sin North; Wong Tai Sin South	Wong Tai Sin and Chuk Yuen
Elected; Seats	(1 territory-wide constituency)		Wong Tai Sin North; Wong Tai Sin South	Tsz Wan Shan and San Po Kong
Elected; Seats	(1 territory-wide constituency)		Wong Tai Sin North; Wong Tai Sin South	Choi Hung Wan and Ngau Chi Wan
Elected; Seats	(1 territory-wide constituency)		Kwun Tong West; Kwun Tong East	Kwun Tong West
Elected; Seats	(1 territory-wide constituency)		Kwun Tong West; Kwun Tong East	Kwun Tong North
Elected; Seats	(1 territory-wide constituency)		Kwun Tong West; Kwun Tong East	Shun Sau
Elected; Seats	(1 territory-wide constituency)		Kwun Tong West; Kwun Tong East	Kwun Tong Central
Elected; Seats	(1 territory-wide constituency)		Kwun Tong West; Kwun Tong East	Kwun Tong South
Elected; Seats	(1 territory-wide constituency)		Kwun Tong West; Kwun Tong East	Lam Tin

=== Regional Council ===
	1986-1995	1995-97
Elected; Seats	Tsuen Wan	Tsuen Wan West
Elected; Seats	Tsuen Wan	Tsuen Wan Central
Elected; Seats	Tsuen Wan	Tsuen Wan East
Elected; Seats	Tuen Mun	Tuen Mun East
Elected; Seats	Tuen Mun	Tuen Mun West
Elected; Seats	Tuen Mun	Tuen Mun Central
Elected; Seats	Tuen Mun	Tuen Mun North
Elected; Seats	Yuen Long	Tin Shui Wai
Elected; Seats	Yuen Long	Yuen Long Town Centre
Elected; Seats	Yuen Long	Yuen Long Rural
Elected; Seats	Yuen Long	Tin Shui Wai North
Elected; Seats	North	Sheung Shui
Elected; Seats	North	Fan Ling & Sha Ta
Elected; Seats	Tai Po	Tai Po West
Elected; Seats	Tai Po	Tai Po Central
Elected; Seats	Tai Po	Tai Po East
Elected; Seats	Sai Kung	Sai Kung Rural and Tak Fu
Elected; Seats	Sai Kung	Tseung Kwan O
Elected; Seats	Sha Tin East; Sha Tin West	Ma On Shan
Elected; Seats	Sha Tin East; Sha Tin West	Sha Tin East
Elected; Seats	Sha Tin East; Sha Tin West	Sha Tin North
Elected; Seats	Sha Tin East; Sha Tin West	Sha Tin South
Elected; Seats	Sha Tin East; Sha Tin West	Sha Tin West
Elected; Seats	Kwai Chung East; Kwai Chung West & Tsing Yi	Upper Kwai Chung
Elected; Seats	Kwai Chung East; Kwai Chung West & Tsing Yi	Kwai Chung Central
Elected; Seats	Kwai Chung East; Kwai Chung West & Tsing Yi	Tsing Yi South and Lower Kwai Chung
Elected; Seats	Islands	Islands

== District Councils ==
- List of constituencies of Central and Western District Council
- List of constituencies of Wan Chai District Council
- List of constituencies of Eastern District Council
- List of constituencies of Southern District Council
- List of constituencies of Yau Tsim Mong District Council
- List of constituencies of Sham Shui Po District Council
- List of constituencies of Kowloon City District Council
- List of constituencies of Wong Tai Sin District Council
- List of constituencies of Kwun Tong District Council
- List of constituencies of Tsuen Wan District Council
- List of constituencies of Tuen Mun District Council
- List of constituencies of Yuen Long District Council
- List of constituencies of North District Council
- List of constituencies of Tai Po District Council
- List of constituencies of Sai Kung District Council
- List of constituencies of Sha Tin District Council
- List of constituencies of Kwai Tsing District Council
- List of constituencies of Islands District Council

== See also ==
- Elections in Hong Kong
- Politics of Hong Kong
