= New Territories West =

Part of area of Hong Kong

Boundary of New Territories West constituency from 1998 to 2021, also the mostly-recognised boundary of the region

New Territories West (NTW) is the western part of Hong Kong's New Territories, covering Yuen Long, Tuen Mun, Tsuen Wan, Kwai Tsing and the Islands District.

== History ==
Settlements in the area, except the Islands District, have been connected by the Castle Peak Road since its completion in the 1920s, which also links Kowloon and facilitates trading.

In 1985, "West New Territories" and "South New Territories" electoral-college constituencies were created. West New Territories consisted of Yuen Long District and Tuen Mun District, while South New Territories consisted of Tsuen Wan District, Islands District and Sai Kung District. The electoral colleges lasted for two terms until they were replaced by the geographical constituencies in 1991 when the first direct election to the Legislative Council were introduced.

In the 1991 election, the directly elected "New Territories West" and "New Territories South" constituencies were created, each returning two members to the Legislative Council using the two-seat constituency two vote system. New Territories West continued to consist of Yuen Long and Tuen Mun Districts, while New Territories South consisted of Tsuen Wan, Islands and Kwai Tsing Districts. The pro-democracy coalition of the United Democrats of Hong Kong (UDHK) and Meeting Point won three of the four seats, with one of the seats in New Territories West taken by Tai Chin-wah with a strong rural background. Tai was soon founded guilty of fraud and the vacancy was taken up by Zachary Wong of the Meeting Point. Another by-election was held in New Territories West after Ng Ming-yum of the Meeting Point died of cancer, of which Tang Siu-tong who had the rural support was elected.

The electoral system was overhauled after one term, replaced by the single-constituency single-vote system in the 1995 Legislative Council election with five new constituencies, namely "New Territories North-west", "New Territories West", "New Territories Central", "New Territories South-west" and "New Territories South". All five seats were taken by the Democratic Party, merger of the United Democrats and Meeting Point.

Following the handover in 1997, the "New Territories West" constituency replaced the colonial constituencies. It remained in place until 2021 under the change of electoral system, "New Territories North", "New Territories North West", and "New Territories South West" were installed as the new constituencies. The Islands District was redistributed to Hong Kong Island West constituency for the first time.

== Evolution ==
Years \ Districts	Yuen Long		Tuen Mun		Tsuen Wan		Kwai Tsing		Islands
Years \ Districts	Northern part	Southern part	NW part	SE part	NW part	SE part	Northern part	Southern part	Islands
1985–1991	West New Territories				South New Territories				
1991–1995	New Territories West				New Territories South				
1995–1997	New Territories North	New Territories North-west	New Territories West	New Territories Central		New Territories South		New Territories South-west	
1998–2021	New Territories West								
2021–present	New Territories North	New Territories West			New Territories South West				Hong Kong Island West
