= 2008 Hong Kong legislative election =

- 7 September 2008

All 60 seats to the Legislative Council 31 seats needed for a majority
- Opinion polls
- Registered: 3,372,007 (GC) ▲5.14%
- Turnout: 1,524,249 (45.20%) ▼10.44pp
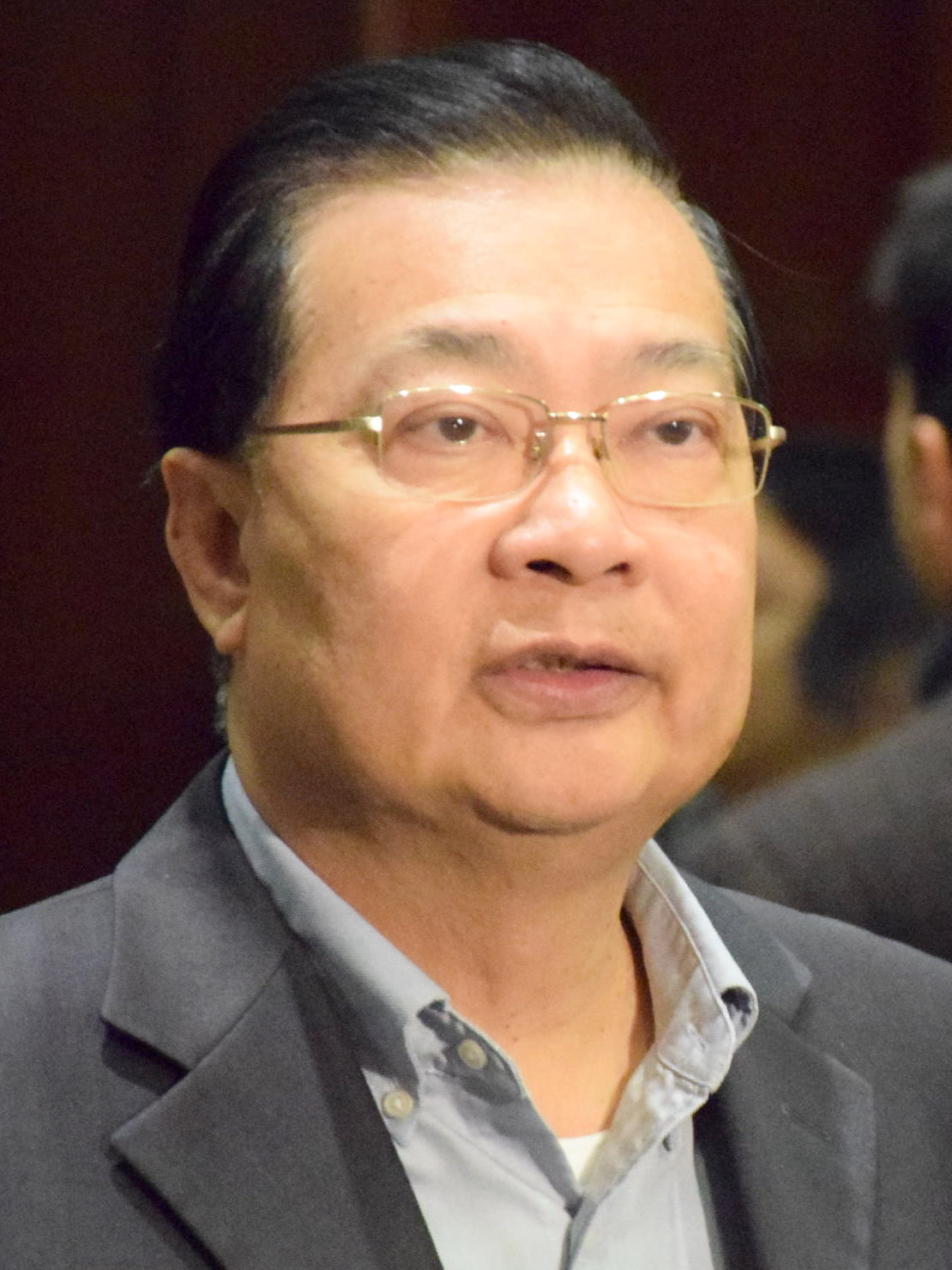

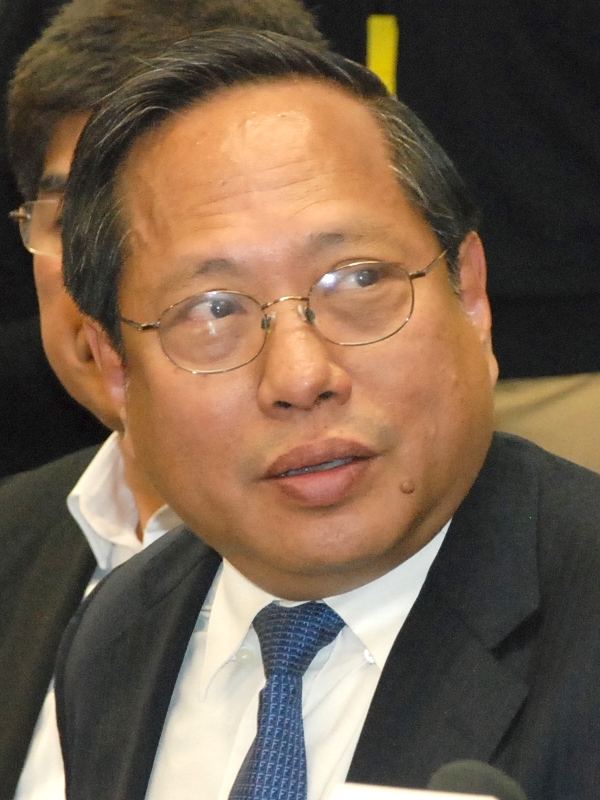

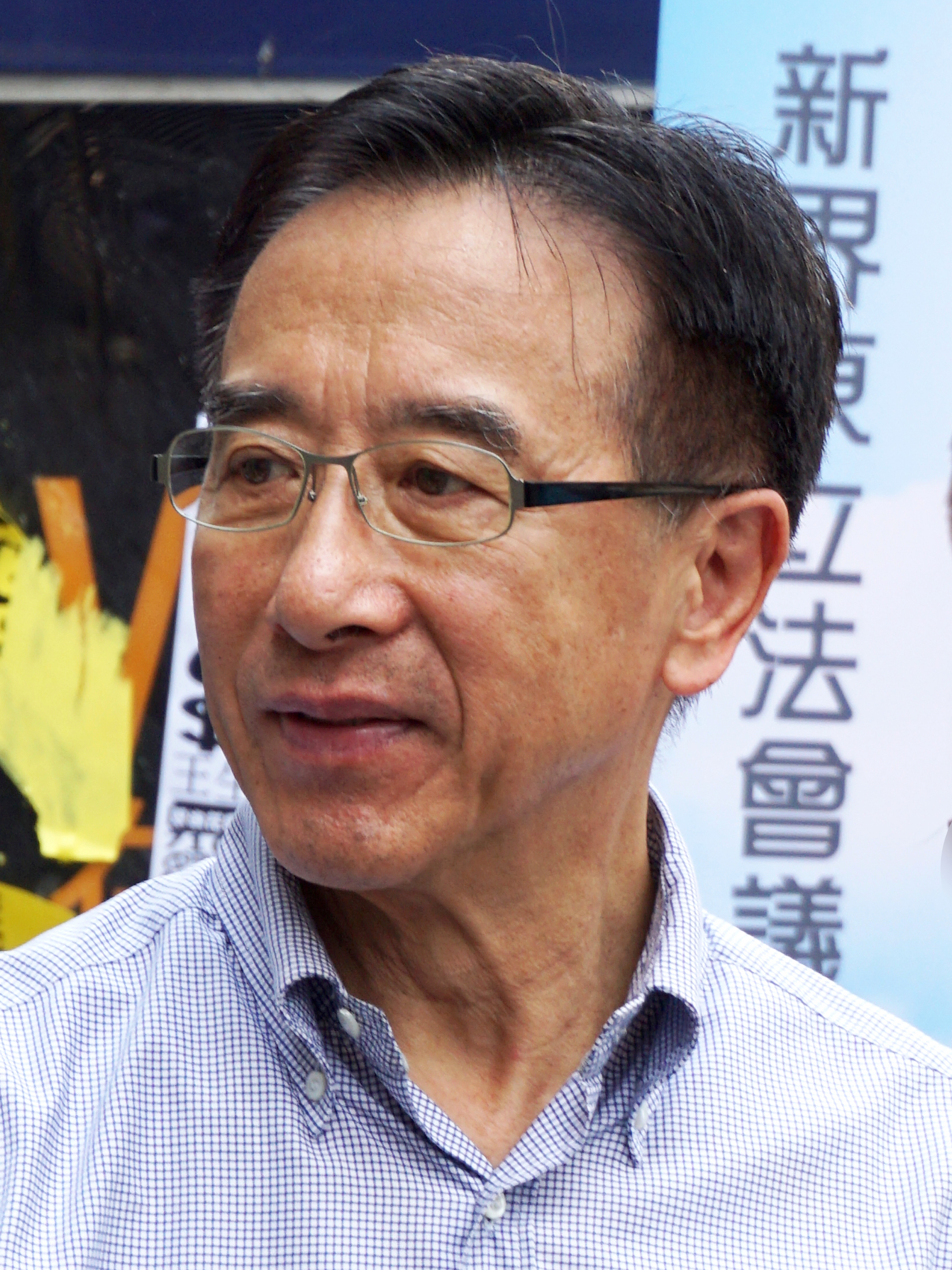

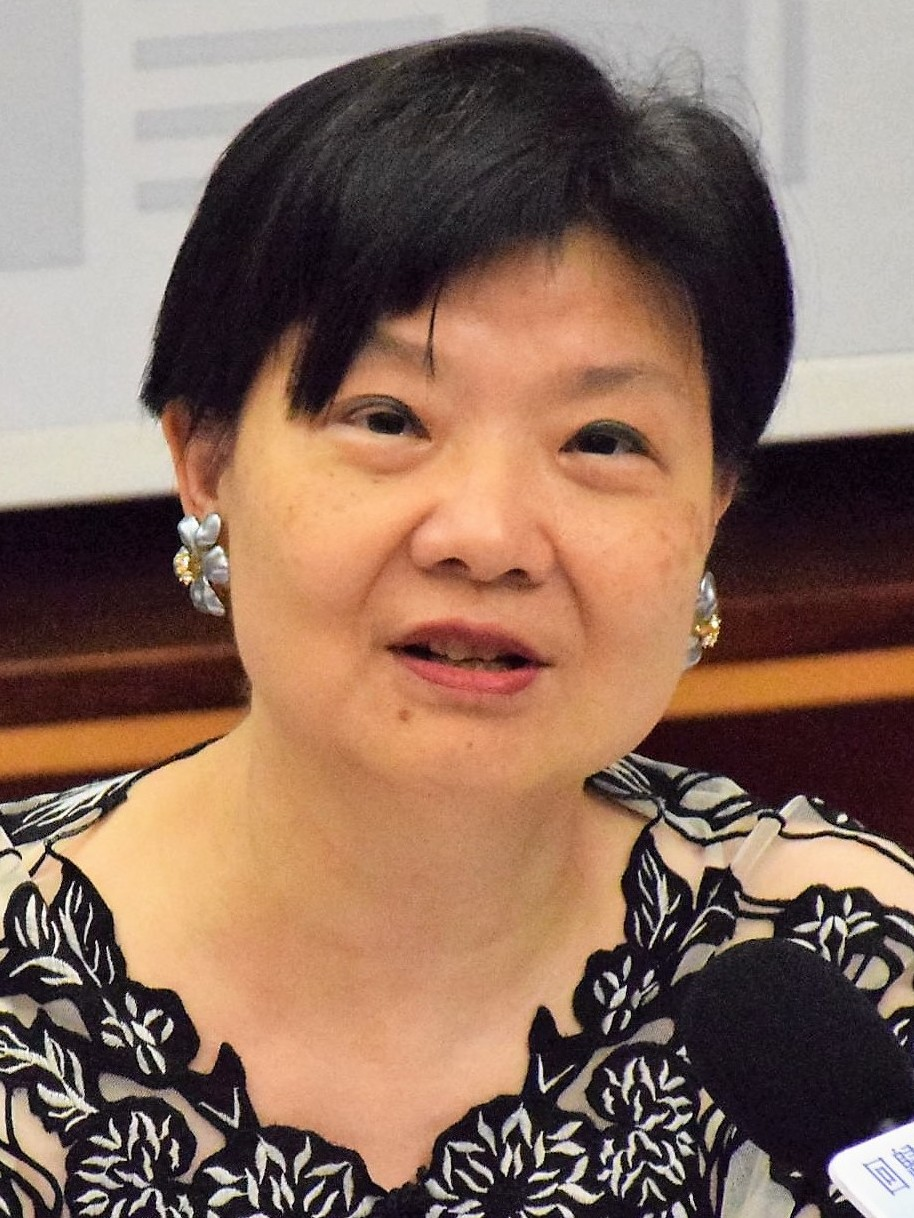

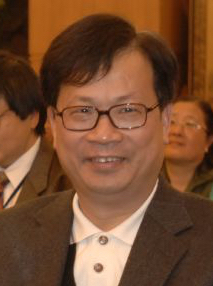

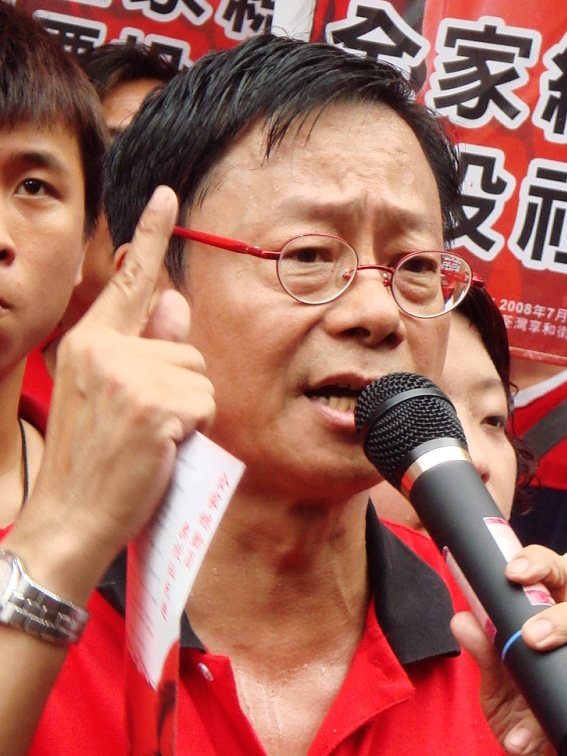

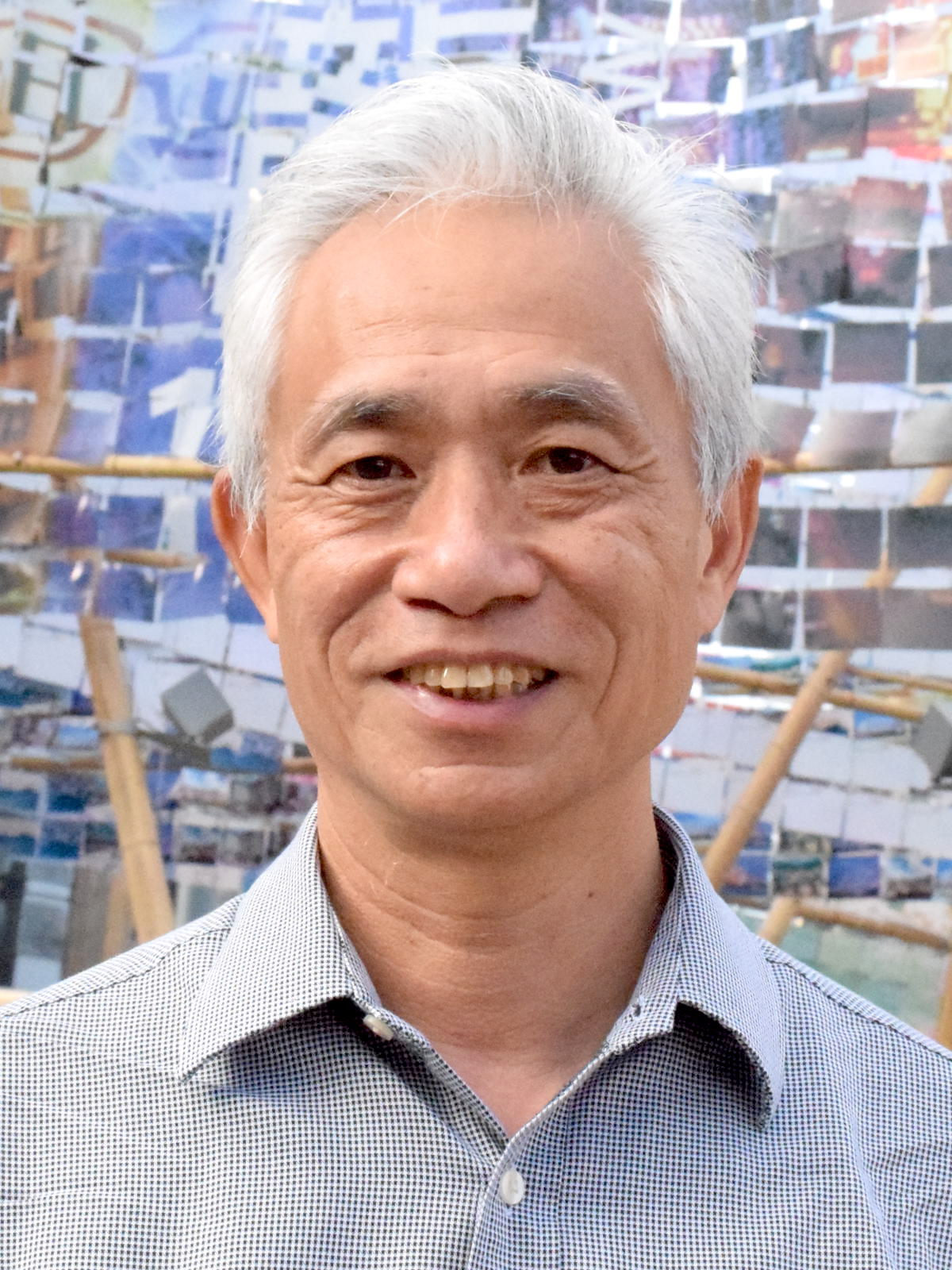

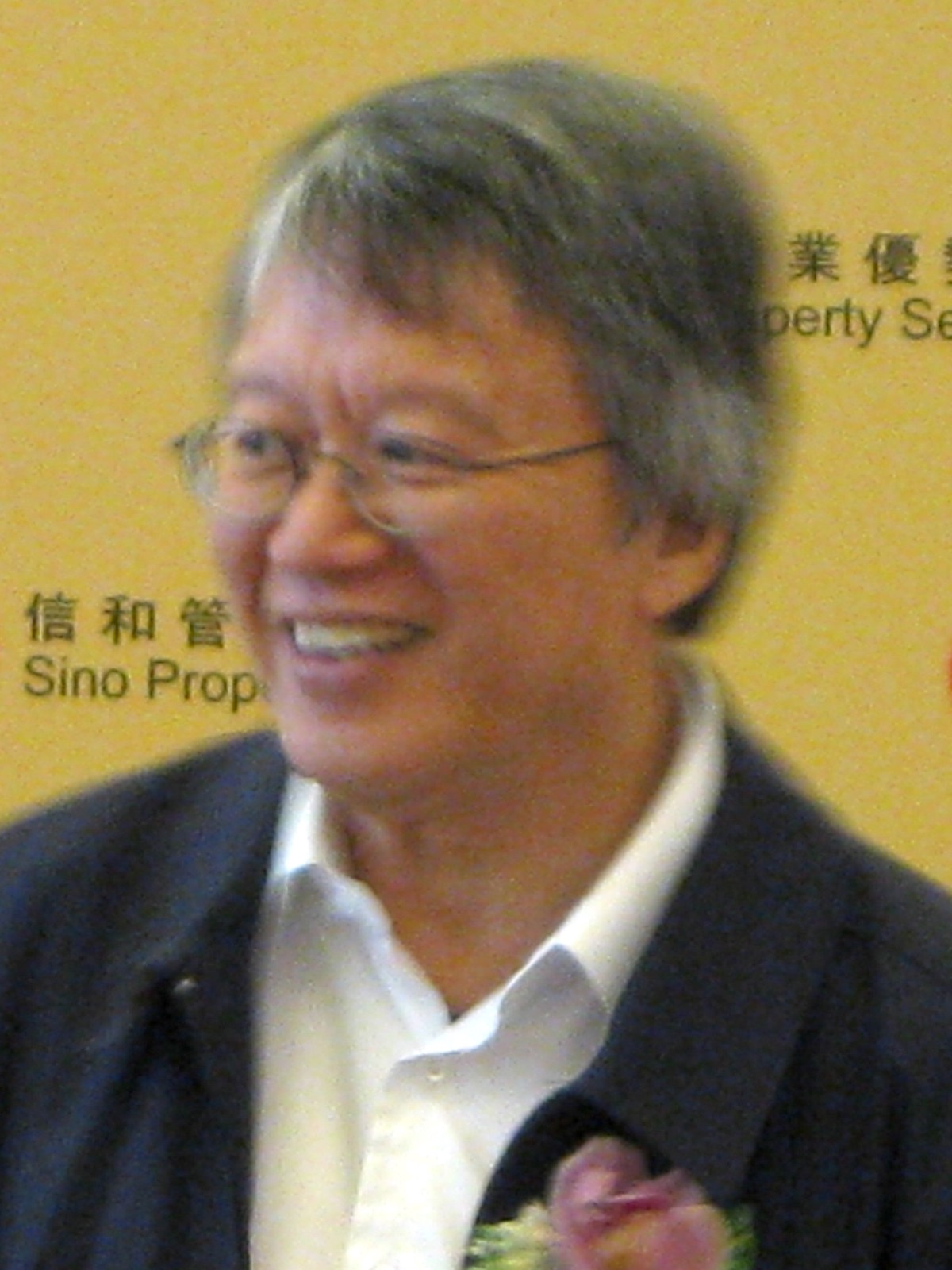

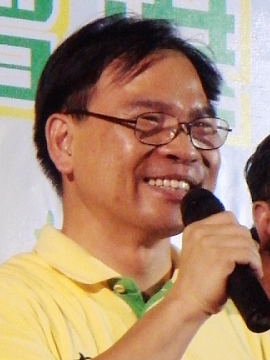
	First party	Second party	Third party
Leader	Tam Yiu-chung	Albert Ho	James Tien
Party	DAB	Democratic	Liberal
Alliance	Pro-Beijing	Pan-democracy	Pro-Beijing
Leader's seat	New Territories West	New Territories West	New Territories East (lost seat)
Last election	10 seats, 22.73%	9 seats, 25.19%	10 seats, 6.72%
Seats won	10 (Note: Note: The three candidates represented both DAB and FTU are counted as FTU candidates in this article.)	8	7
Seat change	▲1	▼1	▼3
Popular vote	347,373	312,692	65,622
Percentage	22.92%	20.63%	4.33%
Swing	▲0.19pp	▼4.56pp	▼2.39pp
	Fourth party	Fifth party	Sixth party
Leader	Audrey Eu	Cheng Yiu-tong	Wong Yuk-man
Party	Civic	FTU	LSD
Alliance	Pan-democracy	Pro-Beijing	Pan-democracy
Leader's seat	Hong Kong Island	Did not stand	Kowloon West
Last election	New party	3 seats, 2.97%	New party
Seats won	5	4	3
Seat change	▼1	▲1	▲1
Popular vote	206,980	86,311	153,390
Percentage	13.66%	5.70%	10.12%
Swing	▲7.04pp	▲2.73pp	N/A
	Seventh party	Eighth party	Ninth party
Leader	Leung Yiu-chung	Lau Chin-shek	Bruce Liu
Party	NWSC	CTU	ADPL
Alliance	Pan-democracy	Pan-democracy	Pan-democracy
Leader's seat	New Territories West	Kowloon West (lost seat)	Did not stand
Last election	1 seat, 3.33%	1 seat, 3.95%	1 seat, 4.22%
Seats won	1	1	1
Seat change	Steady	Steady	Steady
Popular vote	42,441	42,366	42,211
Percentage	2.80%	2.80%	2.79%
Swing	▼0.53pp	▼1.15pp	▼1.43pp
Party control before election
Pro-Beijing camp
Party control after election
Pro-Beijing camp

The 2008 Hong Kong Legislative Council election was held on 7 September 2008 for the 4th Legislative Council since the establishment of the Hong Kong Special Administrative Region. There were 60 seats in the 4th Legislative Council, with 30 members elected by geographical constituencies through direct elections, and 30 members by functional constituencies. Candidates for 14 functional constituency seats were unopposed.

The turnout rate was 45 percent with 1.51 million voters casting the ballots, about 10 percent lower than the previous election in 2004. The Democratic Alliance for the Betterment of Hong Kong (DAB) remained the largest single party in the Legislative Council with 13 seats if including the two members of the Hong Kong Federation of Trade Unions (FTU) while the pro-business Liberal Party suffered a big defeat by losing the two heavyweights, chairman James Tien and vice-chairwoman Selina Chow lost their seats in the New Territories East and the New Territories West. The duo resigned from their party positions and Chow resigned from the Executive Council after the election, which was followed by a great split of the party.

In the backdrop of a deteriorating economy and rising inflation, the pro-grassroots parties scored victories as the new pro-democracy party League of Social Democrats (LSD) had their three candidates elected and the FTU also won in two seats in the geographical constituencies. The pro-democracy flagship party Democratic Party retook the second largest party status despite losing one seat to its ally, the new middle-class oriented Civic Party which took two seats in Hong Kong Island with party leader Audrey Eu stood as the second candidate behind party's new face Tanya Chan.

The share of the pan-democratic parties' vote among voters dropped from 60 percent in 2004 to 57 percent, which translated into a net loss of two seats compared to the last election. The pan-democrats were elected to a total of 23 seats, 19 seats in the directly elected geographical constituencies, and four seats from the functional constituencies. By virtue of having in excess of one-third of the seats in Legislative Council, their ability to veto constitutional changes remained intact. The pan-democrats' veto power was seen as crucial for the electoral arrangements for the 2012 Legislative Council election, which would take place during this session.

== Pre-election issues ==
The Standing Committee of the National People's Congress vote in December 2007 to allow universal suffrage by 2017, and full Legislative Council elections by 2020, tempered the debate on universal suffrage. Wary of political parties, the government sought to defer discussion on other highly sensitive issues until October 2008, in the hopes that the election will be void of focus. The election was therefore fought over issues regarding the minimum wage, health care reform, Old Age Allowance, and the future of RTHK. Also, the case surrounding former Housing Director Leung Chin-man served to highlight the issue of systematic checks and balances, and the lack of political scrutiny of government actions.

Commentators, such as Albert Cheng, noted that the fighting between pro-democracy parties was heating up, but forecast few changes in the overall party standings of the new Council. He cited proportional representation as a mechanism, which built in protection for a multi-party system.

There were some concerns that those seeking the right of abode in Hong Kong felt pressured by lobbyists supporting the DAB. Two advocacy groups echoed abode-seekers' in being bombarded with telephone calls and other pressures to vote for the DAB, or for Regina Ip.

== Candidates ==
A total of 142 candidates on 53 lists entered the election via the geographical constituencies, making it the most contested election since the handover of Hong Kong. The candidates of both the pan-democracy and pro-Beijing coalitions stated that they would not allocate the votes within each camp, leading to infighting inside the caucuses. Martin Lee and Anson Chan announced that they would not stand, and would endorse other candidates. In addition, some incumbent legislators such as Audrey Eu of the Civic Party and Yeung Sum of the Democratic Party were placed second on their lists in an attempt to get less experienced members of their parties elected.

Beijing's involvement in the elections was an open secret: its strategy was to elect a new batch of "independent" aspirants with profession backgrounds and without a strong pro-Beijing image, such as Scarlet Pong, and eventual winners Regina Ip and Priscilla Leung. It had hoped they would appeal to the middle class voters and steal votes from the pan-democratic parties.

The functional constituencies were less competitive: 14 out of the 30 seats were uncontested. The Accounting and Architectural, Surveying and Planning functional constituencies were the most contested, with 5 candidates competing in each constituency. 45 candidates in total ran for the 16 contested seats.

== Retiring incumbents ==
Ten incumbents chose not to run for re-election.

Constituency	Departing incumbents	Party
Hong Kong Island	Martin Lee Chu-ming	Democratic
Hong Kong Island	Rita Fan Hsu Lai-tai	Independent
Hong Kong Island	Anson Chan Fang On-sang	Independent
Kowloon East	Albert Cheng Jing-han	Independent
New Territories East	Li Kwok-ying	DAB
Insurance	Bernard Charnwut Chan	Alliance
Labour	Kwong Chi-kin	FTU
Tourism	Howard Young	Liberal
Industrial (Second)	Lui Ming-wah	Alliance
Information Technology	Sin Chung-kai	Democratic

== Opinion polling ==
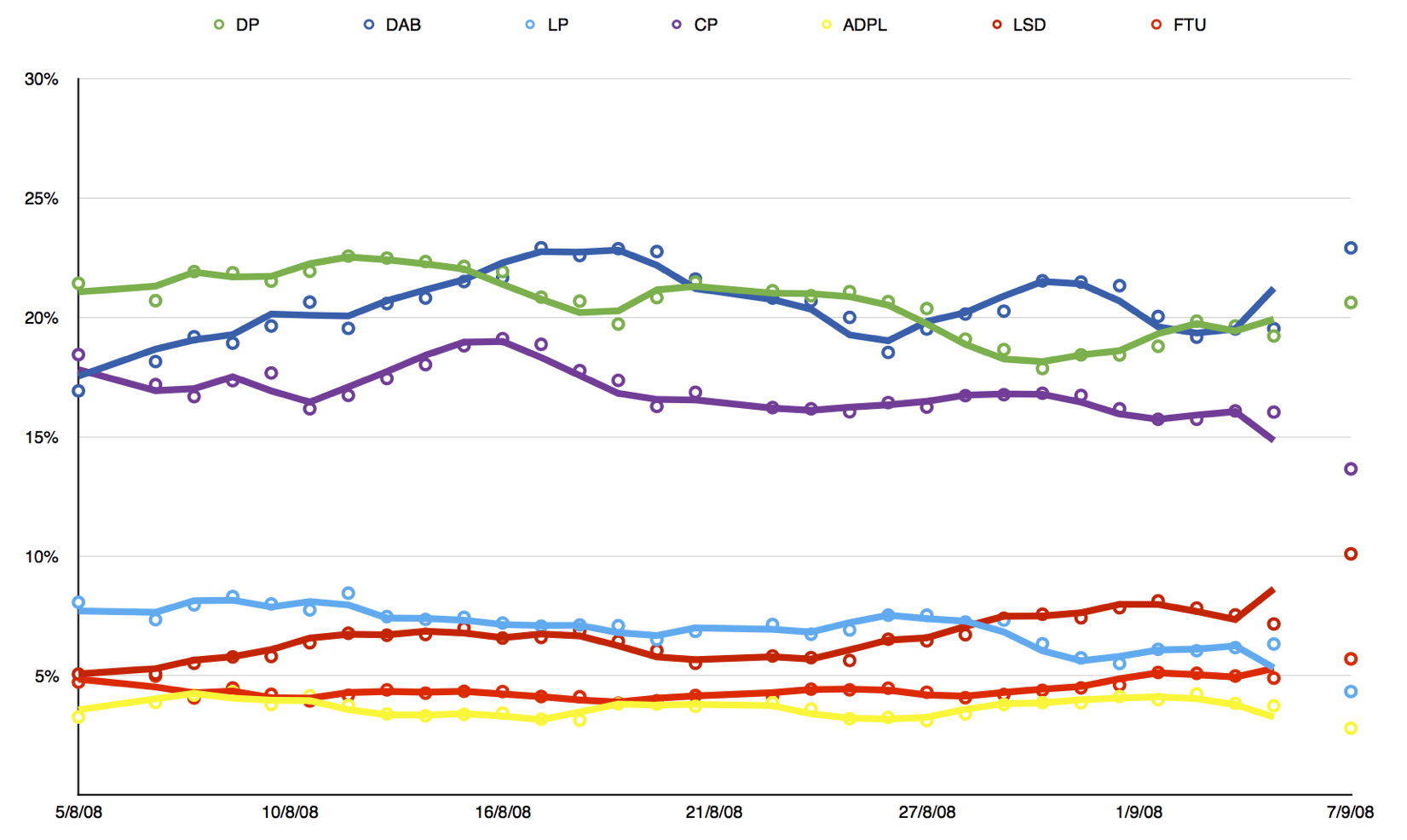
Democratic DAB Liberal Civic ADPL LSD FTU

== Results ==
Result by parties and camps

Results of the election: the party with the plurality of votes by each polling station.

A record number of 3.37 million people registered to vote in the election. The turnout rate was low, at 45% with 1.51 million voters casting ballots.

Commentator Chris Yeung believed that the Liaison Office operated behind the scenes to co-ordinate votes for the pro-Beijing camp. These independents managed to secure seats, but apparently not at the expense of support for the pan-democrats.

The Democratic Alliance for the Betterment of Hong Kong remained the largest single party in Council, with 13 seats. The share of the pan-democratic parties' vote among voters dropped from 60% in 2004 to 57%, which translated into a net loss of 2 seats. The pan-democrats were elected to a total of 23 seats, 19 seats in the directly elected geographical constituencies, and four seats from the functional constituencies. By virtue of having in excess of 1/3 of the seats in LegCo, their ability to veto constitutional changes remained intact. The pan-democrats' veto power were crucial for the electoral arrangements for the 2012 elections, which will take place during this Council.

In the backdrop of a deteriorating economy and rising inflation, voters shifted their preferences towards more radical and grass-roots politicians; the electorate's suspicions of collusion between government and big business dealt a blow to the Liberal Party. The Liberal Party suffered double defeat when Selina Chow and chairman James Tien lost their seats in the New Territories West and New Territories East geographical constituencies respectively. Their bid to secure seats in other constituencies also failed. Tien resigned as the Liberal Party's chairman after his defeat, and Chow resigned both her vice-chairmanship and her seat on the Executive Council of Hong Kong. The election of three members of the League of Social Democrats and four trade-unionists to Legco is set to pose a challenge to the government on welfare and livelihood issues.

Share of votes of the parties by polling stations:

Democratic Party	Civic Party	League of Social Democrats
DAB	FTU

Before election:

↓
26	34
Pro-democracy	Pro-Beijing

Change in composition:

↓
23	37
Pro-democracy	Pro-Beijing

Summary of the 7 September 2008 Legislative Council of Hong Kong election results
Parties and allegiances	Geographical constituencies				Functional constituencies				Total seats	±
Parties and allegiances	Votes	%	±pp	Seats	Votes	%	±pp	Seats	Total seats	±
Democratic Alliance for the Betterment and Progress of Hong Kong	347,373	22.92	▲0.19	7	259	0.21	N/A	3	10	▲1
Liberal Party	65,622	4.33	▼2.39	0	4,089	3.34	▼1.37	7	7	▼3
Hong Kong Federation of Trade Unions	86,311	5.70	▲2.73	2	–	–	–	2	4	▲1
Pro-Beijing individuals and others	103,162	6.81	−	2	33,633	27.50	–	14	16	−
Total for pro-Beijing camp	602,468	39.75	▲2.35	11	37,981	31.06	▼1.47	26	37	▲3
Democratic Party	312,692	20.63	▼4.56	7	41,331	33.80	▼3.15	1	8	▼1
Civic Party	207,000	13.66	▲7.04	4	9,187	7.51		1	5	▼1
League of Social Democrats	153,390	10.12	N/A	3	–	–	–	–	3	▲1
Neighbourhood and Worker's Service Centre	42,441	2.80	▼0.53	1	–	–	–	–	1	0
Hong Kong Confederation of Trade Unions	42,366	2.80	▼1.15	1	–	–	–	–	1	0
Hong Kong Association for Democracy and People's Livelihood	42,211	2.79	▼1.43	1	–	–	–	–	1	0
The Frontier	33,205	2.19	▼4.70	1	–	–	–	–	1	0
Civic Act-up	30,887	2.04	▼0.05	1	–	–	–	–	1	▲1
Hong Kong Social Workers' General Union	–	–	–	–	5,334	4.36	▲1.90	1	1	▲1
Pro-democracy individuals and others	37,515	2.48	−	0	18,276	14.95	–	1	1	−
Total for pan-democracy camp	901,707	59.50	▼2.94	19	74,128	60.62	▼2.19	4	23	▼3
Councillors without formal affiliation with any political party	11,304	0.75	−	0	10,173	8.32	–	0	0	0
Total	1,515,479	100.00		30	122,282	100.00		30	60	0
Valid votes	1,515,479	99.42	▲0.20		122,282	95.56	▼0.85			
Invalid votes	8,770	0.58	▼0.20		5,691	4.44	▲0.85			
Votes cast / turnout	1,524,249	45.20	▼10.43		127,973	60.30	▼9.84			
Registered voters	3,372,007	100.00	▲5.14		212,227	100.00	▲10.32			
Source: Hong Kong government Archived 7 October 2010 at the Wayback Machine

Note: Candidates in 14 functional constituencies were elected uncontested to the Legislative Council. The number of seats for the Hong Kong Federation of Trade Unions in the geographical constituencies exclude Wong Kwok-hing, Wong Kwok-kin and Pan Pey Chyou, who are also DAB members; figures in parentheses in the pan-democracy and pro-Beijing total percentage exclude all votes of other individuals.

=== Votes summary ===
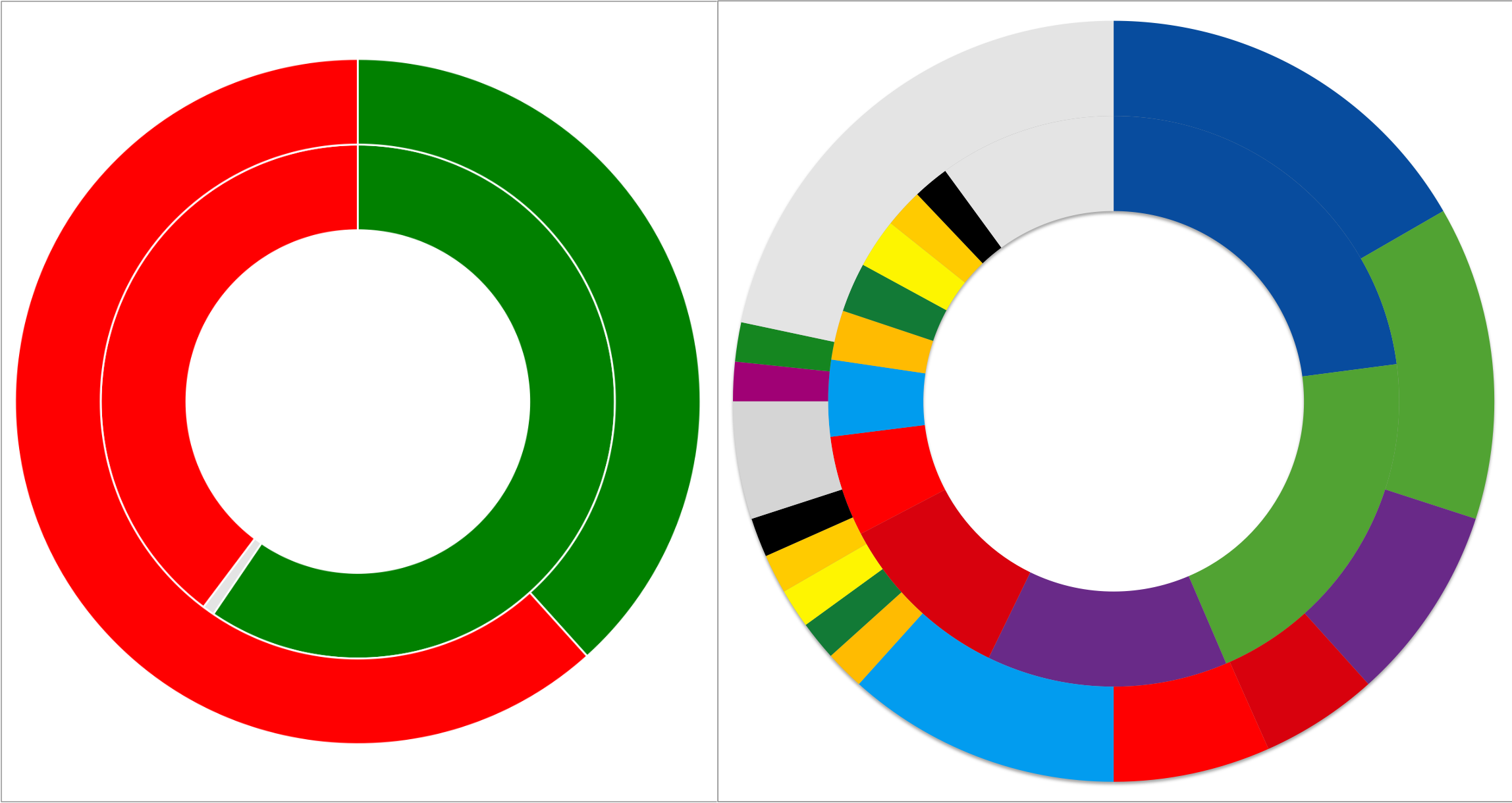
Ring charts of the election results showing popular vote against seats won, coloured in green (Pro-democracy camp) and red (Pro-Beijing camp) on the left and the party colours on the right. Seats won in the election (outer ring) against number of votes (inner ring).

Popular vote
DAB	22.92%
Democratic	20.63%
Civic	13.66%
LSD	10.10%
FTU	5.70%
Liberal	4.33%
NWSC	2.80%
CTU	2.80%
ADPL	2.79%
Frontier	2.19%
Civic Act-up	2.04%
Others	10.03%

=== Seat summary ===
Seats
DAB	16.67%
Democratic	13.33%
Liberal	11.67%
Civic	8.33%
FTU	6.67%
LSD	5.00%
NWSC	1.67%
CTU	1.67%
ADPL	1.67%
Frontier	1.67%
Civic Act-up	1.67%
Independent	30.00%

=== Incumbents defeated ===
Ten incumbents lost re-election

Party	Political camp	Name	Constituency	Remarks
Civic	Pan-democracy	Fernando Cheung Chiu-hung	New Territories West	running for Social Welfare constituency in the last election
Civic	Pan-democracy	Mandy Tam Heung-man	Accountancy	
CTU	Pan-democracy	Lau Chin-shek	Kowloon West	
Democratic	Pan-democracy	Yeung Sum	Hong Kong Island	placed second of the list
FTU	Pro-Beijing	Chan Yuen-han	Kowloon East	placed second of the list
Liberal	Pro-Beijing	Selina Chow Liang Suk-yee	New Territories West	
Liberal	Pro-Beijing	James Tien Pei-chun	New Territories East	
Independent	Pan-democracy	Kwok Ka-ki	Medical	
Independent	Pro-Beijing	Lam Wai-keung	District Council	running for Heung Yee Kuk in the last election

== Candidates lists and results ==
=== Geographical Constituencies (30 seats) ===
Voting system: Party-list proportional representation with largest remainder method and Hare quota.

Results of the Geographical Constituencies
Hong Kong Island (香港島)

List №	Party/Allegiance	Candidate(s)	Votes	Votes %	Seat(s) won
1	Liberal	Lam Chui-lin; Wong Kam-chuen; Ngan Choi-chik	2,166	0.7	
2	Civic Act-up	Cyd Ho Sau-lan	30,887	9.9	1
3	Democratic	Kam Nai-wai; Yeung Sum; Tsui Yuen-wa	39,808	12.7	1
4	LSD	Tsang Kin-shing	10,202	3.3	
5	DAB	Jasper Tsang Yok-sing; Choy So-yuk; Christopher Chung Shu-kun; Cheung Kwok-kwan; Chan Hok-fung; Kwok Wai-keung	60,417	19.3	1
6	Independent	Myra Sophia Siu Man-wa	1,798	0.6	
7	Independent	Lo Wing-lok	20,523	6.5	
8	Civic	Tanya Chan; Audrey Eu Yuet-mee; Amy Yung Wing-sheung	82,600	26.4	2
9	Independent	Regina Ip Lau Suk-yee; Louis Shih Tai-cho; Wong Kin-hing; Ronald Chan Ngok-pang	61,073	19.5	1
10	Independent	Joseph Lai Chi-keong	3,955	1.3	
TOTAL (Quota: 52,238 votes, 16.67%)			313,429	100.0	6

Kowloon West (九龍西)

List №	Party/Allegiance	Candidate(s)	Votes	Votes %	Seat(s) won
1	Independent	Francis Chong Wing-charn	1,076	0.5	
2	DAB	Starry Lee Wai-king; Chung Kong-mo; Chan Wai-ming; Vincent Cheng Wing-shun	39,013	18.9	1
3	SDA	James Lung Wai-man; Bantawa Sukra	591	0.3	
4	Democratic	James To Kun-sun; Lam Ho-yeung	29,690	14.4	1
5	Civic	Claudia Mo Man-ching; Ng Yuet-lan; Tang Chi-ying	17,259	8.4	
6	Independent	Lam Yi-lai	590	0.3	
7	Independent	Priscilla Leung Mei-fun; Edward Leung Wai-kuen; Aaron Lam Ka-fai	19,914	9.6	1
8	LSD	Raymond Wong Yuk-man; Lee Wai-yee	37,553	18.2	1
9	Liberal	Michael Tien Puk-sun; Ho Hin-ming	13,011	6.3	
10	ADPL	Frederick Fung Kin-kee; Rosanda Mok Ka-han; Tsung Po-shan; Wong Chi Yung; Yeung Chun-yu	35,440	17.2	1
11	Independent	Lau Chin-shek	10,553	5.1	
12	Independent	Lau Yuk-shing; Nandeed Cheung Kit-fung; David Tsui	290	0.1	
13	Independent	Tam Hoi-pong	1,603	0.8	
TOTAL(Quota: 41,317 votes, 20.00%)			206,583	100.0	5

Kowloon East (九龍東)

List №	Party/Allegiance	Candidate(s)	Votes	Votes %	Seat(s) won
1	Democratic	Wu Chi-wai	16,365	6.9	
2	LSD	Andrew To Kwan-hang	28,690	12.1	
3	DAB	Chan Kam-lam; Joe Lai Wing-ho; Maggie Chan Man-ki; Hung Kam-in	53,472	22.6	1
4	Civic	Alan Leong Kah-kit; Yu Kwun-wai; Wong Hok-ming	39,274	16.6	1
5	Democratic	Fred Li Wah-ming; Kai Ming-wah; Wong Kai-ming; Wong Wai-tag	48,124	20.4	1
6	FTU	Wong Kwok-kin; Chan Yuen-han; Peter Wong Kit-hin; Kan Ming-tung	50,320	21.3	1
TOTAL (Quota: 59,061 votes, 25.00%)			236,245	100.0	4

New Territories West (新界西)

List №	Party/Allegiance	Candidate(s)	Votes	Votes %	Seat(s) won
1	Civic	Fernando Cheung Chiu-hung; Sumly Chan Yuen-sum; Wong Ka-wa	27,910	7.0	
2	CTU	Lee Cheuk-yan; Tam Chun-yin	42,366	10.6	1
3	DAB	Tam Yiu-chung; Cheung Hok-ming; Leung Che-cheung; Chan Han-pan; Lung Shui-hing; Leung Kar-ming; Andy Lo Kwong-shing; Lui Kin	92,037	23.1	2
4	Democratic	Albert Ho Chun-yan; Hui Chi-fung; Lo Man-hon	36,764	9.2	1
5	ADPL	Tandon Lal Chaing; Yeung Chi-hang	6,771	1.7	
6	Independent	Yuen Wai-chung	1,338	0.3	
7	LSD	Albert Chan Wai-yip	32,182	8.1	1
8	Independent	Chow Ping-tim	1,720	0.4	
9	FTU/DAB	Wong Kwok-hing; Alice Mak Mei-kuen; Marina Tsang Tze-kwan; Tsui Fan; Dennis Leung Tsz-wing; Tang Ka-piu; Yiu Kwok-wai; Manwell Chan	35,991	9.0	1
10	Democratic	Cheung Yin-tung; Kwong Chun-yu	10,069	2.5	
11	Independent	Leung Suet-fong; Thapa Komal	1,366	0.3	
12	Liberal	Selina Chow Liang Shuk-yee; Chow Wing-kan	21,570	5.4	
13	NWSC	Leung Yiu-chung; Wong Yun-tat	42,441	10.7	1
14	Democratic	Lee Wing-tat; Wong Suet-ying; Lam Siu-fai; Cheung Wai-mei; Lam Lap-chi	45,767	11.5	1
TOTAL (Quota: 49,787 votes, 12.50%)			398,292	100.0	8

New Territories East (新界東)

List №	Party/Allegiance	Candidate(s)	Votes	Votes %	Seat(s) won
1	Liberal	James Tien Pei-chun; Terry Kan Wing-fai; Christine Fong Kwok-shan	28,875	8.0	
2	Party for Civil Rights and Livelihood	Siu See-kong; David Yung Chiu-wing	1,129	0.3	
3	Frontier	Emily Lau Wai-hing; Ricky Or Yiu-lam	33,205	9.2	1
4	Democratic	Nelson Wong Sing-chi; Mok Siu-lun	44,174	12.2	1
5	LSD	Leung Kwok-hung	44,763	12.4	1
6	Independent	Alvin Lee Chi-wing	4,007	1.1	
7	Democratic	Andrew Cheng Kar-foo; Yam Kai-bong; Shirley Ho Suk-ping; Leung Li; Kwan Wing-yip; Michael Yung Ming-chau; Frankie Lam Siu-chung	41,931	11.6	1
8	Civic	Ronny Tong Ka-wah; Tsang Kwok-fung; Tsang Kin-chiu	39,957	11.1	1
9	Independent	Scarlett Pong Oi-lan	20,455	5.7	
10	DAB	Lau Kong-wah; Gary Chan Hak-kan; Mok Kam-kwai; Wong Pik-kiu; Chan Kwok-kai; Lau Kwok-fan; Calvin Lin Chor-keung	102,434	28.4	2
TOTAL (Quota: 51,561 votes, 14.29%)			360,930	100.0	7

=== Functional Constituencies (30 seats) ===
Voting systems: Different voting systems apply to different functional constituencies, namely for the Heung Yee Kuk, Agriculture and Fisheries, Insurance and Transport, the preferential elimination system of voting; and for the remaining 24 FCs used the first-past-the-post voting system.

Results of the Functional Constituencies
Constituency	Incumbent	Result	Candidate(s)
Heung Yee Kuk	Lam Wai-keung	Incumbent ran for District Council FC; Liberal gain	Lau Wong-fat (Liberal) uncontested
Agriculture and Fisheries	Wong Yung-kan (DAB)	Incumbent hold	Wong Yung-kan (DAB) uncontested
Insurance	Bernard Charnwut Chan (Alliance)	Incumbent retired Nonpartisan gain	Chan Kin-por 45.61% Choi Chung-fu 36.84% Chun Chi-yuk 17.55%
Transport	Miriam Lau Kin-yee (Liberal)	Incumbent re-elected	Miriam Lau Kin-yee (Liberal) 94.23% Tam Chi-wah 5.77%
Education	Cheung Man-kwong (PTU/Democratic)	Incumbent re-elected	Cheung Man-kwong (PTU/Democratic) 71.26% Ho Hon-kuen 23.20% Yu Yee-wah 5.19%
Legal	Margaret Ng Ngoi-yee (Civic)	Incumbent re-elected	"Margaret Ng Ngoi-yee (Civic) 53.30% Junius Ho Kwan-yiu (Independent) 46.70%
Accountancy	Tam Heung-man (Civic)	Incumbent lost re-election Independent gain	Paul Chan Mo-po (Independent) 41.67% Tam Heung-man (Civic) 30.31% Elve Kung Yiu-fai (Independent) 22.95% Wong Wang-tai 4.24% Yim Ting-wai 0.82%
Medical	Kwok Ka-ki	Incumbent lost re-election Nonpartisan gain	Leung Ka-lau 32.58% Ho Pak-leung 31.42% Kwok Ka-ki 27.47%
Health Services	Joseph Lee Kok-long	Incumbent re-elected	Joseph Lee Kok-long 66.99% Wan Tak-choi (Independent) 33.01%
Engineering	Raymond Ho Chung-tai (Alliance)	Incumbent re-elected	Raymond Ho Chung-tai 50.03% Albert Lai Kwong-tak (Civic) 46.47% Raymond Man 3.50%
Architectural, Surveying and Planning	Patrick Lau Sau-shing (Alliance)	Incumbent re-elected	Patrick Lau Sau-shing 37.27% Yu Kam-hung 32.37% Stanley Ng Wing-fai (Democratic) 18.57% Chan Yiu-fai 9.99% Chan Chan-fai (Independent) 1.80%
Labour (3 seats)	Li Fung-ying (FLU)	Incumbent re-elected	Li Fung-ying uncontested
Labour (3 seats)	Kwong Chi-kin (FTU)	Incumbent retired FTU hold	Ip Wai-ming (FTU) uncontested
Labour (3 seats)	Wong Kwok-hing (FTU/DAB)	Incumbent ran for NTW GC; FTU hold	Pan Pey-chyou (FTU) uncontested
Social Welfare	Fernando Cheung Chiu-hung (Civic)	Incumbent ran for NTW GC; SWGU gain	Cheung Kwok-che (SWGU) 66.04% Tik Chi-yuen (Democratic) 33.96%
Real Estate and Construction	"Abraham Razack" Shek Lai-him (Alliance)	Incumbent hold	"Abraham Razack" Shek Lai-him (Independent) uncontested
Tourism	Howard Young (Liberal)	Incumbent retired Independent gain	Paul Tse Wai-chun (Independent) 36.69% Tung Yiu-chung (Liberal) 35.67% Freddy Yip Hing-ning (Independent) 18.46% Paulus Johannes Zimmerman (Civic) 9.17%
Commercial (First)	Jeffrey Lam Kin-fung (Liberal)	Incumbent re-elected	Jeffrey Lam Kin-fung (Liberal) 70.24% Markus Joytak Shaw (Independent) 29.76%
Commercial (Second)	Philip Wong Yu-hong	Incumbent hold	Philip Wong Yu-hong uncontested
Industrial (First)	Andrew Leung Kwan-yuen (Liberal)	Incumbent hold	Andrew Leung Kwan-yuen (Liberal) uncontested
Industrial (Second)	Lui Ming-wah (Alliance)	Incumbent retired Nonpartisan gain	Lam Tai-fai uncontested
Finance	David Li Kwok-po	Incumbent hold	David Li Kwok-po uncontested
Financial Services	Chim Pui-chung	Incumbent hold	Chim Pui-chung uncontested
Sports, Performing Arts, Culture and Publication	Timothy Fok Tsun-ting	Incumbent hold	Timothy Fok Tsun-ting uncontested
Import and Export	Wong Ting-kwong (DAB)	Incumbent hold	Wong Ting-kwong (DAB) uncontested
Textiles and Garment	Sophie Leung Lau Yau-fun (Liberal)	Incumbent re-elected	Sophie Leung Lau Yau-fun (Liberal) 63.84% Chung Kwok-pan 36.16%
Wholesale and Retail	Vincent Fang Kang (Liberal)	Incumbent re-elected	Vincent Fang Kang (Liberal) 64.73% Chiu Chun-kwok 35.27%
Information Technology	Sin Chung-kai (Democratic)	Incumbent retired Independent gain	Tam Wai-ho (Independent) 50.44% Charles Peter Mok 49.56%
Catering	Tommy Cheung Yu-yan (Liberal)	Incumbent hold	Tommy Cheung Yu-yan (Liberal) uncontested
District Council	Lau Wong-fat (Liberal)	Incumbent ran for Heung Yee Kuk FC; DAB gain	Ip Kwok-him (DAB) 65.40% Lam Wai-keung 34.60%

== See also ==
- Legislative Council of Hong Kong
- 2010 Hong Kong by-election
