= New Territories West (1998 constituency) =

Former Hong Kong functional constituency

Coordinates: 22°20′N 114°00′E

- Former Geographical constituency for the Legislative Council of Hong Kong
- Boundary of New Territories West in Hong Kong
- District: Tsuen Wan District; Tuen Mun District; Yuen Long District; Kwai Tsing District; Islands District
- Region: New Territories
- Population: 2,174,700 (2020)
- Electorate: 1,308,081 (2020)

Former constituency
- Created: 1998
- Abolished: 2021
- Number of members: Five (1998–2000); Six (2000–2004); Eight (2004–2012); Nine (2012–2021)
- Created from: New Territories Central, New Territories North-west (1995), New Territories South, New Territories South-west (1995), New Territories West (1995)
- Replaced by: Hong Kong Island West (2021), New Territories North West (2021), New Territories South West (2021)

The New Territories West geographical constituency was one of the geographical constituencies in the Legislative Council of Hong Kong from 1998 to 2021. It was established in 1998 for the first SAR Legislative Council election and was abolished under the 2021 overhaul of the Hong Kong electoral system. Located in the western part of the New Territories, it was the largest geographical constituency in Hong Kong with 1,308,081 electorates in 2020. It consisted of Tsuen Wan District, Kwai Tsing District, Tuen Mun District, Yuen Long District and Islands District. In the 2016 Legislative Council election, it elected nine members of the Legislative Council using the Hare quota of party-list proportional representation.

== History ==
The single-constituency single-vote system was replaced by the party-list proportional representation system for the first SAR Legislative Council election designed by Beijing to reward the weaker pro-Beijing candidates and dilute the electoral strength of the majority pro-democrats. Five seats were allocated to New Territories West, where the pro-democrats took four of the seats with one seat went to Tam Yiu-chung of the pro-Beijing Democratic Alliance for the Betterment of Hong Kong (DAB) with nearly one-fifth of the popular vote. Pro-grassroots democrats Lee Cheuk-yan of the Hong Kong Confederation of Trade Unions (CTU) and Leung Yiu-chung of the Neighbourhood and Worker's Service Centre (NWSC) each won a seat, with pro-democracy flagship party Democratic Party took two seats with Lee Wing-tat and Albert Ho being elected.

One extra seat was added to the constituency in the 2000 Legislative Council election, where the Democratic Party split their tickets into three in order to maximise its chance to win one more seat, due to the unique design of the Hare quota of the party-list proportional representation. Different zones were set up for each ticket to gather their votes, Kwai Tsing and Islands Districts for Lee Wing-tat, Tuen Mun and rural Yueng Long for Albert Ho and Tsuen Wan, Yuen Long Town Centre, Tin Shui Wai and a small part of Tuen Mun for Albert Chan. With the rural support of the DAB–PA joint ticket, Tang Siu-tong was able to beat the Democratic tickets to gain the extra seat at the expense of Lee Wing-tat who lost the re-election.

In the 2004 Legislative Council election, the number of seats in New Territories West was increased to eight, where the two new seats were taken by Lee Wing-tat who came back from his loss, and Selina Chow of the Liberal Party who rode on the popularity gained from the party's opposition 2003 Basic Law Article 23 legislation. Selina Chow lost her 2008 re-election which she complained the rural votes were taken away by DAB's rural candidate Cheung Hok-ming. Chow was replaced by veteran trade unionist Wong Kwok-hing of the Hong Kong Federation of Trade Unions (FTU).

In 2010, Albert Chan of the League of Social Democrats (LSD) resigned from the office to rigger a by-election as a de facto referendum on the government's constitutional reform proposal. Chan was re-elected with a low turnout due to the government and pro-Beijing boycott.

The deal on the modified constitutional reform proposal struck by the moderate democrats and the Beijing authorities expanded the number of the geographical constituency seats from 30 to 35, where the seats in New Territories West were increased to nine. The DAB deployed an offensive strategy by splitting their ticket into three separate ones, led by Tam Yiu-chung, Leung Che-cheung and Chan Han-pan respectively. All three DAB tickets were elected, taking the advantage on the miscalculation of the pro-democrats, where the Civic Party took a overly aggressive strategy by fielding Kwok Ka-ki and Audrey Eu on the same ticket, hoping to win two seats. As a result, the Civics failed to get Eu elected and wasted votes at the expense on the Democratic Party who saw Lee Wing-tat and Josephine Chan both failed to win a seat. With Michael Tien of the New People's Party (NPP) also won a seat and Alice Mak retained a seat for the FTU, the pro-Beijing camp achieved a majority in New Territories West for the first time by winning five seats compared to pro-democrats' four.

The pro-Beijing camp retained its majority in the 2016 Legislative Council election, as the pro-democrats again split their votes in the overcrowding field. Localist camp Eddie Chu and Civic Passion's Cheng Chung-tai were elected with high votes among the opposition candidate, while Civic Kwok Ka-ki and Democrat Andrew Wan took the two other seats. Veteran Lee Cheuk-yan of the Labour Party was unexpectedly defeated by pro-Beijing independent Junius Ho with a margin of 0.91 percentage point, who took Tam Yiu-chung's place who was retiring.

== Members returned ==
Below are all the members since the creation of the New Territories West constituency. The number of seats allocated to New Territories has been increased from five to nine between 1998 and 2012 due to the enlargement.

LegCo members for New Territories West, 1998–2021
Term	Election	Member	Member	Member	Member	Member	Member	Member	Member	Member
1st	1998	Lee Wing-tat (DP)	Tam Yiu-chung (DAB)	Albert Ho (DP)	Lee Cheuk-yan (TF→CTU→Lab/CTU)	Leung Yiu-chung (NWSC)				
2nd	2000	Albert Chan (DP→Ind→LSD)	Tam Yiu-chung (DAB)	Albert Ho (DP)	Lee Cheuk-yan (TF→CTU→Lab/CTU)	Leung Yiu-chung (NWSC)	Tang Siu-tong (PA)			
3rd	2004	Albert Chan (DP→Ind→LSD)	Tam Yiu-chung (DAB)	Albert Ho (DP)	Lee Cheuk-yan (TF→CTU→Lab/CTU)	Leung Yiu-chung (NWSC)	Cheung Hok-ming (DAB)	Lee Wing-tat (DP)	Selina Chow (LP)	
4th	2008	Albert Chan (DP→Ind→LSD)	Tam Yiu-chung (DAB)	Albert Ho (DP)	Lee Cheuk-yan (TF→CTU→Lab/CTU)	Leung Yiu-chung (NWSC)	Cheung Hok-ming (DAB)	Lee Wing-tat (DP)	Wong Kwok-hing (FTU)	
4th	2008	Vacant	Tam Yiu-chung (DAB)	Albert Ho (DP)	Lee Cheuk-yan (TF→CTU→Lab/CTU)	Leung Yiu-chung (NWSC)	Cheung Hok-ming (DAB)	Lee Wing-tat (DP)	Wong Kwok-hing (FTU)	
4th	2010 (b)	Albert Chan (LSD→PP)	Tam Yiu-chung (DAB)	Albert Ho (DP)	Lee Cheuk-yan (TF→CTU→Lab/CTU)	Leung Yiu-chung (NWSC)	Cheung Hok-ming (DAB)	Lee Wing-tat (DP)	Wong Kwok-hing (FTU)	
5th	2012	Albert Chan (LSD→PP)	Tam Yiu-chung (DAB)	Kwok Ka-ki (CP)	Lee Cheuk-yan (TF→CTU→Lab/CTU)	Leung Yiu-chung (NWSC)	Leung Che-cheung (DAB/NTAS)	Michael Tien (NPP→RT)	Alice Mak (FTU)	Chan Han-pan (DAB/NTAS)
6th	2016	Cheng Chung-tai (Civic Passion)	Junius Ho (Ind)	Kwok Ka-ki (CP)	Eddie Chu (Ind)	Andrew Wan (DP)	Leung Che-cheung (DAB/NTAS)	Michael Tien (NPP→RT)	Alice Mak (FTU)	Chan Han-pan (DAB/NTAS)
6th	2016	Cheng Chung-tai (Civic Passion)	Junius Ho (Ind)	Kwok Ka-ki (CP)	Vacant	Andrew Wan (DP)	Leung Che-cheung (DAB/NTAS)	Michael Tien (NPP→RT)	Alice Mak (FTU)	Chan Han-pan (DAB/NTAS)
6th	2016	Vacant	Junius Ho (Ind)	Vacant	Vacant	Vacant	Leung Che-cheung (DAB/NTAS)	Michael Tien (NPP→RT)	Alice Mak (FTU)	Chan Han-pan (DAB/NTAS)

=== Summary of seats won ===
Term	Election	Distribution
1st	1998	4 / 1
2nd	2000	4 / 2
3rd	2004	5 / 3
4th	2008	5 / 3
5th	2012	4 / 5
6th	2016	4 / 5

	1998	2000	2004	2008	2012	2016
Democratic	2	2	2	2		1
DAB	1	1	2	2	3	2
Frontier	1					
NWSC		1	1	1	1	
CTU		1	1	1		
Progressive Alliance		1				
Liberal			1			
FTU				1	1	1
LSD				1		
Civic					1	1
People Power					1	
Labour					1	
NPP					1	1
Civic Passion						1
Independent	1		1			2
Pro-democracy	4	4	5	5	4	4
Pro-Beijing	1	2	3	3	5	5
Seats	5	6	8	8	9	9

=== Vote share summary ===
	1998	2000	2004	2008	2012	2016
Democratic	39.2	34.3	26.9	23.2	11.8	6.9
DAB	19.4	29.6	24.9	23.1	22.8	18.0
Frontier	12.5					
NWSC	10.3	17.3	12.7	10.7	8.8	3.5
ADPL	5.2		3.1	1.7		3.4
Liberal	0.8	2.7	10.9	5.4		0.2
CTU		15.2	9.9	10.6		
FTU				9.0	7.1	8.2
LSD				8.1	1.9	4.7
Civic				7.0	14.5	7.0
People Power					8.9	
Labour					8.2	5.0
NPP					7.6	11.7
Civic Passion						9.0
Youngspiration						1.7
Independent and Others	12.7	1.0	10.6	1.0	8.5	20.6
Pro-democracy	71.2	66.7	60.5	61.3	54.6	55.2
Pro-Beijing	28.8	32.3	38.7	37.5	43.0	44.4

== Election results ==
The largest remainder method (with Hare quota) of the proportional representative electoral system was introduced in 1998, replacing the single-member constituencies of the 1995 election. Elected candidates are shown in bold. Brackets indicate the quota + remainder.

=== 2010s ===

↓
**1**	**1**	**1**	**2**	**1**	**2**	**1**

Vote share
1. DAB (18.0%)
2. NPP (11.7%)
3. Civic Passion (9.03%)
4. FTU (8.23%)
5. Civic (7.02%)
6. Democratic (6.91%)
7. Labour (5.00%)
8. LSD/PP (4.73%)
9. NWSC (3.48%)
10. ADPL (2.96%)
11. Youngspiration (1.65%)
12. Liberal (0.24%)
13. Christians to the World (0.14%)
14. Politihk SS (0.14%)
15. Other (20.7%)

2016 Legislative Council election: New Territories West
List	Candidates	Votes	Of total (%)	± from prev.
**Quota**		67,049	11.11	
Nonpartisan	**Eddie Chu Hoi-dick**	84,121	13.94 (11.11+2.83)	N/A
NPP	**Michael Tien Puk-sun** Wilson Wong Wai-shun, So Ka-man, Jonathan Tsui Hiu-kit, Kam Man-fung, Wyran Cheng Chit-pun, Sammi Fu Hiu-lam	70,646	11.71 (11.11+0.60)	+4.13
DAB	**Chan Han-pan** Jody Kwok Fu-yung, Dragon Li Sai-lung, Michelle Leung Kar-ming, Jones Chan Chun-chung, Lui Dik-ming, Pau Ming-hong	58,673	9.72	+2.39
Civic Passion	**Cheng Chung-tai** Cheung Yiu-sum	54,496	9.03	N/A
DAB (NTAS)	**Leung Che-cheung** Clement Lui Kin, Ken Wong Hon-kuen, Terry Yip Man-pan, Chiu Kwan-siu, Lai Ka-man	50,190	8.32	–0.40
FTU	**Alice Mak Mei-kuen** Yiu Kwok-wai, Kot Siu-yuen, Ken Fung Pui-yin, Lau Chin-pang	49,680	8.23	+1.16
Civic	**Kwok Ka-ki** Henry Sin Ho-fai	42,334	7.02	–7.46
Democratic	**Andrew Wan Siu-kin** Ho Chun-yan, Lee Wing-tat, Catherine Wong Lai-sheung, Lam Siu-fai	41,704	6.91	–4.86
Independent	**Ho Kwan-yiu**	35,657	5.91	+3.74
Labour	Lee Cheuk-yan, Chiu Yan-loy	30,149	5.00	–3.22
LSD (People Power)	Wong Ho-ming, Albert Chan Wai-yip	28,529	4.73	–6.03
NWSC	Wong Yun-tat, Leung Ching-shan, Rayman Chow Wai-hung	20,974	3.48	–5.30
ADPL	Frederick Fung Kin-kee	17,872	2.96	N/A
Youngspiration (TSWNF)	Wong Chun-kit, Wong Pak-yu	9,928	1.65	N/A
Nonpartisan	Carolyn Tong Wing-chi	2,408	0.40	N/A
Nonpartisan	Clarice Cheung Wai-ching	2,390	0.40	N/A
Liberal	Chow Wing-kan	1,469	0.24	N/A
Christians to the World	Hendrick Lui Chi-hang	812	0.13	N/A
Nonpartisan	Kwong Koon-wan	810	0.13	N/A
Politihk SS	Ko Chi-fai, Innes Tang Tak-shing	604	0.10	N/A
Total valid votes		603,446	100.00	
Rejected ballots		9,624		
Turnout		613,070	56.43	+5.14
Registered electors		1,086,515		

↓
**1**	**1**	**1**	**1**	**1**	**3**	**1**

Vote share
1. DAB (22.8%)
2. Civic (14.5%)
3. Democratic (11.8%)
4. People Power (8.90%)
5. NWSC (8.78%)
6. Labour (8.22%)
7. NPP (7.58%)
8. FTU (7.07%)
9. Third Force (3.36%)
10. LSD (1.86%)
11. Democratic Alliance (0.58%)
12. Other (4.58%)

2012 Legislative Council election: New Territories West
List	Candidates	Votes	Of total (%)	± from prev.
**Quota**		55,401	11.11	
Civic	**Kwok Ka-ki** Audrey Eu Yuet-mee	72,185	14.48 (11.11+3.37)	+7.48
People Power	**Albert Chan Wai-yip** Jacqueline Chan So-ling, Raymond Lai, Tong Wing-chi	44,355	8.90	+0.80
NWSC	**Leung Yiu-chung** Wong Yun-tat	43,799	8.78	−1.92
DAB	**Tam Yiu-chung** Lung Shui-hing, Yip Man-pan, Mo Shing-fung	43,496	8.72	−14.38
Labour	**Lee Cheuk-yan** Tam Chun-yin	40,967	8.22	−2.38
NPP	**Michael Tien Puk-sun** Clarice Cheung Wai-ching, Wong Cheuk-kin, Ho Kin-cheong	37,808	7.58	N/A
DAB (NTAS)	**Chan Han-pan** Poon Chi-shing, Nixie Lam Lam, Chan Chun-chung, Law Kwan, Leung Kar-ming, Tsang Tai	36,555	7.33	N/A
FTU	**Alice Mak Mei-kuen** Luk Chung-hung, Manwell Chan, Kot Siu-yuen, Tang Cheuk-him	35,239	7.07	−1.93
DAB	**Leung Che-cheung** Tsang Hin-keung, Lui Kin, Christina Maisenne Lee, Wong Wai-ling, Chui Kwan-siu	33,777	6.77	N/A
Democratic	Lee Wing-tat, Lam Lap-chi, Lai King-wai	32,792	6.58	−4.92
Democratic	Josephine Chan Shu-ying, Zachary Wong Wai-ying, Li Hung-por, Catherine Wong Lai-sheung, Ho Hang-mui	25,892	5.19	−4.01
Third Force	Chan Keung, Ting Yin-wah, So Ka-man, Chow Ping-tim, Tang Ka-leung, Nancy Poon Siu-ping, Raju Gurung	16,767	3.36	N/A
Independent	Chan Yut-wah	11,997	2.41	N/A
Independent	Ho Kwan-yiu	10,805	2.17	N/A
LSD	Tsang Kin-shing	9,280	1.86	N/A
Democratic Alliance	Mak Ip-sing	2,896	0.58	N/A
Total valid votes		498,610	100.00	
Rejected ballots		7,816		
Turnout		506,426	51.29	+9.12
Registered electors		987,333		

2010 New Territories West by-election
Party	Candidate	Votes	%	±%
**LSD**	**Albert Chan Wai-yip**	**109,609**	**81.73**	
Nonpartisan	Li Kwai-fong	12,555	9.36	
Tertiary 2012	Kwok Wing-kin	6,192	4.62	
Independent	Chow Ping-tim	3,276	2.44	
Nonpartisan	Li Sai-hung	2,475	1.85	
Majority		97,054	72.37	
Total valid votes		134,107	100.00	
Rejected ballots		5,256		
Turnout		139,363	14.71	
Registered electors		947,276		
LSD **hold**		Swing		

=== 2000s ===

↓
**1**	**1**	**1**	**2**	**2**	**1**

Vote share
1. Democratic (23.2%)
2. DAB (23.1%)
3. NWSC (10.7%)
4. CTU (10.6%)
5. FTU (9.00%)
6. LSD (8.10%)
7. Civic (7.00%)
8. Liberal (5.40%)
9. ADPL (1.70%)
10. Other (1.20%)

2008 Legislative Council election: New Territories West
List	Candidates	Votes	Of total (%)	± from prev.
**Quota**		49,787	12.50	
DAB	**Tam Yiu-chung, Cheung Hok-ming** Leung Che-cheung, Chan Han-pan, Lung Shui-hing, Leung Kar-ming, Andy Lo Kwong-shing, Lui Kin	92,037	23.11 (12.50+10.61)	−1.77
Democratic	**Lee Wing-tat** Wong Suet-ying, Lam Siu-fat, Cheung Wai-mei, Lam Lap-chi	45,767	11.49	−1.99
NWSC	**Leung Yiu-chung** Wong Yun-tat	42,441	10.66	−2.04
CTU	**Lee Cheuk-yan** Tam Chun-yin	42,366	10.64	+0.73
Democratic	**Ho Chun-yan** Hui Chi-fung, Lo Man-hon	36,764	9.23	−4.25
FTU (DAB)	**Wong Kwok-hing** Alice Mak Mei-kuen, Marina Tsang Tze-kwan, Tsui Fan, Dennis Leung Tsz-wing, Tang Ka-piu, Yiu Kwok-wai, Manwell Chan	35,991	9.04	N/A
LSD	**Albert Chan Wai-yip**	32,182	8.08	+0.27
Civic	Fernando Cheung Chiu-hung, Sumly Chan Yuen-sum, Wong Ka-wa	27,910	7.01	N/A
Liberal	Selina Chow Liang Shuk-yee, Chow Wing-kan	21,570	5.42	−5.48
Democratic	Cheung Yin-tung, Kwong Chun-yu	10,069	2.53	N/A
ADPL	Tandon Lai Chaing, Yeung Chi-hang	6,771	1.70	−1.44
Independent	Chow Ping-tim	1,720	0.43	+0.03
Blue Intelligent Union	Leung Suet-fong, Thapa Komal	1,366	0.3	N/A
Nonpartisan	Yuen Wai-chung	1,338	0.34	N/A
Total valid votes		398,292	100.00	
Rejected ballots		2,427		
Turnout		400,719	42.49	−10.99
Registered electors		943,161		

↓
**1**	**1**	**2**	**1**	**1**	**2**

Vote share
1. Democratic (26.9%)
2. DAB (24.9%)
3. NWSC (12.7%)
4. Liberal (10.9%)
5. CTU (9.90%)
6. ADPL (3.10%)
7. New Forum (1.00%)
8. Other (10.6%)

2004 Legislative Council election: New Territories West
List	Candidates	Votes	Of total (%)	± from prev.
**Quota**		57,926	12.50	
DAB	**Tam Yiu-chung, Cheung Hok-ming** Leung Che-cheung, Au Yeung Po-chun, Tsui Fan, Chan Han-pan, Andy Lo Kwong-sing, Philip Ng King-wah	115,251	24.87 (12.50+12.37)	−4.71
Democratic	**Lee Wing-tat** Sumly Chan Yuen-sum	62,500	13.49 (12.50+0.99)	+3.11
Democratic	**Ho Chun-yan** Cheung Yin-tung	62,342	13.45 (12.50+0.95)	+2.25
NWSC	**Leung Yiu-chung** Andrew Wan Siu-kin	59,033	12.74 (12.50+0.24)	−4.53
Liberal	**Selina Chow Liang Shuk-yee**	50,437	10.88	+8.14
CTU	**Lee Cheuk-yan** Ip Ngok-fung	45,725	9.87	−5.32
Independent	**Albert Chan Wai-yip**	36,278	7.83	−4.86
ADPL	Yim Tim-sang, Kong Fung-yi, Tai Yin-chiu, Kwun Tung-wing	14,570	3.14	N/A
Nonpartisan	Stephen Char Shik-ngor	9,116	1.97	N/A
New Forum	Lui Hau-tuen, Siu Shing-choi, Chan Choi-hi	4,511	0.97	N/A
Nonpartisan	Ng Tak-leung	1,920	0.41	N/A
Independent	Chow Ping-tim	1,725	0.37	N/A
Total valid votes		463,408	100.00	
Rejected ballots		3,449		
Turnout		466,857	53.48	+9.75
Registered electors		873,031		

↓
**1**	**1**	**2**	**1**	**1**

Vote share
1. Democratic (34.3%)
2. DAB/PA (29.6%)
3. NWSC (17.3%)
4. CTU (15.2%)
5. Liberal (2.70%)
6. Other (0.90%)

2000 Legislative Council election: New Territories West
List	Candidates	Votes	Of total (%)	± from prev.
**Quota**		57,266	16.67	
DAB (HKPA)	**Tam Yiu-chung, Tang Siu-tong** Leung Che-cheung, Chau Chuen-heung, Chan Yau-hoi, Au Yeung Po-chun	101,629	29.58 (16.67+12.91)	+10.23
NWSC	**Leung Yiu-chung**	59,348	17.27	+6.97
CTU (Frontier)	**Lee Cheuk-yan**	52,202	15.19	+2.74
Democratic	**Albert Chan Wai-yip** Cosmas Kwong Kwok-chuen	43,613	12.69	N/A
Democratic	**Ho Chun-yan** Josephine Chan Shu-ying, Cheung Yuet-lan, Catherine Wong Lai-sheung	38,472	11.20	N/A
Democratic	Lee Wing-tat, Wong Bing-kuen	35,648	10.38	N/A
Liberal	David Yeung Fuk-kwong	9,408	2.74	+1.9
Nonpartisan	Angela Man Yun-fei	3,274	0.95	N/A
Total valid votes		343,594	100.00	
Rejected ballots		2,663		
Turnout		346,257	43.73	−9.52
Registered electors		791,746		

=== 1990s ===
↓
**1**	**2**	**1**	**1**

Vote share
1. Democratic (39.2%)
2. DAB (19.4%)
3. Frontier (12.5%)
4. ADPL (5.20%)
5. Liberal (0.80%)
6. 123DA (0.80%)
7. Other (22.1%)

1998 Legislative Council election: New Territories West
List	Candidates	Votes	Of total (%)	± from prev.
**Quota**		75,035	20.00	
Democratic	**Lee Wing-tat, Ho Chun-yan** Zachary Wong Wai-yin, Josephine Chan Shu-ying	147,098	39.21 (20.00+19.21)	
DAB	**Tam Yiu-chung** Leung Che-cheung, Chau Chuen-heung, Chan Wan-sang, Hui Chiu-fai	72,587	19.35	
Frontier	**Lee Cheuk-yan** Ip Kwok-fun	46,696	12.45	
Nonpartisan	**Leung Yiu-chung**	38,627	10.30	
Nonpartisan	Lam Wai-keung, Tai Kuen, Chow Ping-tim, Chan Ka-mun, Tso Shiu-wai	25,905	6.91	
ADPL	Yim Tim-sang	19,500	5.20	
Nonpartisan	Ting Yin-wah	11,176	2.98	
Independent	Yeung Fuk-kwong	6,428	1.71	
Liberal	Paul Chan Sing-kong, Liu Kwong-sang, Wong Kwok-keung	3,138	0.84	
123DA	Yum Sin-ling, Christopher Chu, Mak Ip-sing, Shung King-fai	3,050	0.81	
Pioneer	Lam Chi-leung	968	0.26	
Total valid votes		375,173	100.00	
Rejected ballots		2,042		
Turnout		377,215	53.25	
Registered electors		708,443		

== See also ==
- List of constituencies of Hong Kong
