= New Territories South =

New Territories South may refer to:

- South New Territories (1985 constituency), Hong Kong
- New Territories South (1991 constituency), Hong Kong
- New Territories South (1995 constituency), Hong Kong
