= Lok Tsui (constituency) =

Hong Kong constituency

- Elected constituency for the Tuen Mun District Council
- Boundary of Lok Tsui in Tuen Mun District
- District: Tuen Mun
- Legislative Council constituency: New Territories North West
- Population: 14,469 (2019)
- Electorate: 8,569 (2019)

Current constituency
- Created: 1994
- Number of members: One
- Member: Vacant

Lok Tsui is one of the 31 constituencies of the Tuen Mun District Council, one of the nine local councils in the New Territories, Hong Kong. Located in the far west end of the district, the seat elects one member of the council every four years. Since its creation in 1994, the seat has been held by the Democratic Party except for a brief period from 2015 to 2019, when it was held by pro-Beijing independent councillor Junius Ho.

The seat was held by Democratic Party former chairman Albert Ho until he was unseated by Junius Ho in the 2015 Hong Kong District Council election. The constituency has attracted huge attention from the media during 2019 elections, owing to the accusation of Ho's involvement in 2019 Yuen Long attack and the controversial speech of Ho. Lo Chun-yu from the Democratic Party ran the election in this constituency, but has been threatened, tracked and assaulted by different means before the polling day.

== Councillors represented ==
Election	Member	Party	%
1994	Lo Chun-hung	Democratic	58.04
1999	Albert Ho Chun-yan	Democratic	58.81
2003	Albert Ho Chun-yan	Democratic	82.32
2007	Albert Ho Chun-yan	Democratic	61.46
2011	Albert Ho Chun-yan	Democratic	51.31
2015	Junius Ho Kwan-yiu	Independent	46.19
2019	Lo Chun-yu→Vacant	Democratic	58.87

== Election results ==
=== 2010s ===
Tuen Mun District Council Election, 2019: Lok Tsui
Party	Candidate	Votes	%	±%
Democratic	Lo Chun-yu	3,839	58.87	+19.07
Independent	Ho Kwan-yiu	2,626	40.27	−5.93
Nonpartisan	Chiang Ching-man	56	0.86	
Majority		1,213	18.60	
Turnout		6,566	76.65	
Democratic gain from Independent		Swing		

Tuen Mun District Council Election, 2015: Lok Tsui
Party	Candidate	Votes	%	±%
Independent	Ho Kwan-yiu	2,013	46.2	
Democratic	Ho Chun-yan	1,736	39.8	–11.5
Civic Passion	Cheng Chung-tai	391	9.0	
Message	Yuen Wai-chung	99	2.3	
Nonpartisan	Shum Kam-tim	94	2.2	–38.2
Nonpartisan	Cheung Wing-wai	25	0.6	
Majority		277	6.4	
Turnout		4,389	56.4	
Independent gain from Democratic		Swing		

Tuen Mun District Council Election, 2011: Lok Tsui
Party	Candidate	Votes	%	±%
Democratic	Ho Chun-yan	1,876	51.3	−10.2
Independent	Shum Kam-tim	1,477	40.4	
People Power	Albert Chan Wai-yip	303	8.3	
Majority		399	10.9	−12.1
Democratic hold		Swing		

=== 2000s ===
Tuen Mun District Council Election, 2007: Lok Tsui
Party	Candidate	Votes	%	±%
Democratic	Ho Chun-yan	1,606	61.5	−20.8
DAB	Tony Li Kam-man	1,007	38.5	+17.8
Majority		599	23.0	−44.6
Democratic hold		Swing		

Tuen Mun District Council Election, 2003: Lok Tsui
Party	Candidate	Votes	%	±%
Democratic	Ho Chun-yan	2,183	82.3	+23.5
DAB	Kong Chi-hung	469	17.7	
Majority		1,714	64.6	+47.0
Democratic hold		Swing		

=== 1990s ===
Tuen Mun District Council Election, 1999: Lok Tsui
Party	Candidate	Votes	%	±%
Democratic	Ho Chun-yan	1,255	58.8	+0.8
Independent	She Chi-keung	879	41.2	
Majority		276	17.6	+1.6
Democratic hold		Swing		

Tuen Mun District Board Election, 1994: Lok Tsui
Party	Candidate	Votes	%	±%
Democratic	Lo Chun-hung	1,083	58.0	
DAB	Cheung Kwok-wai	783	42.0	
Majority		300	16.0	(new)
