= New Territories West (1991 constituency) =

Hong Kong administrative division

- Former Geographical constituency for the Legislative Council of Hong Kong
- Boundary of New Territories West in Hong Kong
- District: Tuen Mun District; Yuen Long District
- Region: New Territories
- Electorate: 198,817

Former constituency
- Created: 1991
- Abolished: 1995
- Number of members: Two
- Replaced by: New Territories Central; New Territories West; New Territories North-west; New Territories North

New Territories East was a geographical constituency in the election for the Legislative Council of Hong Kong in 1991, which elects two members of the Legislative Council using the dual-seat constituency dual vote system. The constituency covers Tuen Mun District and Yuen Long District in New Territories.

Two by-elections were held on 8 December 1991 and 30 August 1992, after conservative Tai Chin-wah gave up his seat for forging educational qualifications and after democrat Ng Ming-yum died in office respectively. Democrats won Tai's seat while conservatives succeeded Ng.

The constituency was divided and replaced by the New Territories Central, New Territories West, New Territories North-west, and New Territories North constituencies in 1995.

== Returned members ==
Elected members are as follows:

Election	Member	Party	Member	Party
1991	Ng Ming-yum	UDHK	Tai Chin-wah	FSHK
1991 (b)	Ng Ming-yum	UDHK	Zachary Wong	MP
1992 (b)	Tang Siu-tong	Independent	Zachary Wong	MP
1994	Tang Siu-tong	Independent	Zachary Wong	Democratic

== Election results ==
1992 New Territories West by-election
Party	Candidate	Votes	%	±%
Independent	Tang Siu-tong	33,038	51.3	+16.7
United Democrats	Ho Chun-yan	30,466	47.3	
Independent	Sui See-chun	743	1.2	
Majority		2,572	4.0	
Total valid votes		64,247	100.0	
Independent gain from United Democrats		Swing		

1991 New Territories West by-election
Party	Candidate	Votes	%	±%
Meeting Point	Zachary Wong Wai-yin	21,559	39.5	+20.5
Independent	Tang Siu-tong	18,858	34.6	+18.3
ADPL	Yim Tin-sang	7,780	14.3	
Independent	Kingsley Sit Ho-yin	5,745	10.5	
Majority		2,701	4.9	
Total valid votes		53,942	100.0	
Rejected ballots		592		
Turnout		54,534	27.4	
Registered electors		198,812		
Meeting Point gain from FSHK		Swing		

1991 Legislative Council election: New Territories West
Party	Candidate	Votes	%	±%
United Democrats	Ng Ming-yum	42,319	29.42	
FSHK	Tai Chin-wah	30,871	21.46	
Meeting Point	Zachary Wong Wai-yin	27,243	18.94	
Independent	Tang Siu-tong	23,389	16.26	
LDF	Tso Shiu-wai	20,018	13.92	
Turnout		81,468	40.98	
Registered electors		198,817		
United Democrats win (new seat)				
FSHK win (new seat)				
