= China Human Rights Lawyers Concern Group =

China Human Rights Lawyers Concern Group (CHRLCG) was a non-profit organization whose stated objective was to advocate for the protection of human rights lawyers and legal rights defenders in China. It was established on 20 January 2007 by a group of lawyers, legislators and academics based in Hong Kong, including Albert Ho. It announced on 21 September 2021 that it was in the process of disbanding by the end of the month, in response to a police data request from 25 August. Ho had resigned from the group on 13 September.

== See also ==
- Human Rights in China (organization)
