= Christians to the World =

Hong Kong political group

Christians to the World Chinese: 蒞地基督徒
- Founder: Hendrick Lui Chi-hang
- Founded: 2016
- Ideology: Pro-democracy; Localism; Christian politics

Christians to the World (Chinese: 蒞地基督徒) is a Christian-oriented pro-democracy political group established by social worker Hendrick Lui Chi-hang in 2016. It encourages the political activeness of the Christians, holding localist thoughts and advocates for a referendum to decide the prospect of the Hong Kong sovereignty in 2047 to implement genuine autonomy of Hong Kong. In the 2016 Hong Kong Legislative Council election, Lui ran in the New Territories West and received 812 votes, 0.13 percent of the vote share.

The group joined the movement against the Hong Kong Christian Council's decision to draw lots among their 847 members for the 2016 Hong Kong Election Committee Subsector elections.

== See also ==
- 2014 Hong Kong protests
