= Geographical constituency =

Directly elected constituency in Hong Kong

In Hong Kong, geographical constituencies, as opposed to functional constituencies, are elected by all eligible voters according to geographically demarcated constituencies. There are currently 5 geographical constituencies in Hong Kong, returning 35 members to the Legislative Council. Following the 2021 electoral reforms passed by the Standing Committee of the mainland National People's Congress, the number of members returned by geographical constituencies would be lowered to 20, while the total number of seats in the Legislative Council would be increased to 90.

== History ==
Geographical constituencies (GC) were first introduced in Hong Kong's first legislative election with direct elections in 1991. 18 constituencies, each returning 2 members using plurality block voting was created for the 1991 election. Under Chris Patten's electoral reform, single-member constituencies were introduced for geographical constituencies in the 1995 election. After the transfer of sovereignty in 1997, the Provisional Legislative Council enacted the Legislative Council Ordinance (Cap. 542) which stipulated the use of party-list proportional representation with seats apportioned by the largest remainder method under the Hare Quota. Between 1998 and 2016, 5 geographical constituencies were established returned by proportional representation with 3-9 seats each:

| | 1998 | 2000 | 2004 | 2008 | 2012 | 2016 |
|---|---|---|---|---|---|---|
| Hong Kong Island | 4 | 5 | 6 | | 7 | 6 |
| Kowloon West | 3 | 4 | | 5 | | 6 |
| Kowloon East | 3 | 4 | 5 | 4 | 5 | |
| New Territories West | 5 | 6 | 8 | | 9 | |
| New Territories East | 5 | | 7 | | 9 | |
| Total no. of GC seats | 20 | 24 | 30 | | 35 | |

In 2010, the Government's motion for amending Annex II of the Basic Law was passed. As a result, 5 new seats were added to Geographical Constituencies, making a total of 35.

=== Changes to electoral system ===
The following table summarises the changes to the electoral system of Geographical Constituencies since 1991:

| Election Year | Voting system | Number of constituencies | District magnitude | Total number of GC seats | Proportion of LegCo seats |
|---|---|---|---|---|---|
| 1991 | Plurality-at-large | 9 constituencies | 2 seats | 18 seats | 29.5% |
| 1995 | First-past-the-post voting | 20 constituencies | 1 seat | 20 seats | 33.3% |
| 1998 | Proportional representation (Largest remainder method: Hare quota) | 5 constituencies | 3-9 seats | 20 seats | 33.3% |
| 2000 | Proportional representation (Largest remainder method: Hare quota) | 5 constituencies | 3-9 seats | 24 seats | 40% |
| 2004 | Proportional representation (Largest remainder method: Hare quota) | 5 constituencies | 3-9 seats | 30 seats | 50% |
| 2008 | Proportional representation (Largest remainder method: Hare quota) | 5 constituencies | 3-9 seats | 30 seats | 50% |
| 2012 | Proportional representation (Largest remainder method: Hare quota) | 5 constituencies | 3-9 seats | 35 seats | 50% |
| 2016 | Proportional representation (Largest remainder method: Hare quota) | 5 constituencies | 3-9 seats | 35 seats | 50% |
| 2021 | Single non-transferable vote | 10 constituencies | 2 seats | 20 seats | 22.2% |

=== Changes to districting ===
The following table charts the evolution of districting of geographical constituencies of the LegCo:

| | 1991 | 1995 | 1998 | 2000 | 2004 | 2008 | 2012 | 2016 | 2021 |
|---|---|---|---|---|---|---|---|---|---|
| GCs | Hong Kong Island East | Hong Kong Island Central | Hong Kong Island (LC1) | | | | | | Hong Kong Island East |
| GCs | Hong Kong Island East | Hong Kong Island East | Hong Kong Island (LC1) | | | | | | Hong Kong Island East |
| GCs | Hong Kong Island East | Hong Kong Island South | Hong Kong Island (LC1) | | | | | | Hong Kong Island East |
| GCs | Hong Kong Island West | Hong Kong Island South | Hong Kong Island (LC1) | | | | | | Hong Kong Island West |
| GCs | Hong Kong Island West | Hong Kong Island West | Hong Kong Island (LC1) | | | | | | Hong Kong Island West |
| GCs | Kowloon East | Kowloon East | Kowloon East (LC3) | | | | | | Kowloon East |
| GCs | Kowloon East | Kowloon South-east | Kowloon East (LC3) | | | | | | Kowloon East |
| GCs | Kowloon Central | Kowloon North-east | Kowloon East (LC3) | | | | | | Kowloon East |
| GCs | Kowloon Central | Kowloon North-east | Kowloon East (LC3) | | | | | | Kowloon Central |
| GCs | Kowloon Central | Kowloon Central | Kowloon East (LC3) | | | | | | Kowloon Central |
| GCs | Kowloon Central | Kowloon Central | Kowloon West (LC2) | | | | | | Kowloon Central |
| GCs | Kowloon Central | Kowloon South | Kowloon West (LC2) | | | | | | Kowloon Central |
| GCs | Kowloon Central | Kowloon South-west | Kowloon West (LC2) | | | | | | Kowloon West |
| GCs | Kowloon West | Kowloon South-west | Kowloon West (LC2) | | | | | | Kowloon West |
| GCs | Kowloon West | Kowloon West | Kowloon West (LC2) | | | | | | Kowloon West |
| GCs | New Territories East | New Territories East | New Territories East (LC5) | | | | | | New Territories South East |
| GCs | New Territories East | New Territories East | New Territories East (LC5) | | | | | | New Territories North East |
| GCs | New Territories East | New Territories South-east | New Territories East (LC5) | | | | | | New Territories North East |
| GCs | New Territories North | New Territories North-east | New Territories East (LC5) | | | | | | New Territories North East |
| GCs | New Territories North | New Territories North | New Territories East (LC5) | | | | | | New Territories North |
| GCs | New Territories South | New Territories North | New Territories West (LC4) | | | | | | New Territories North |
| GCs | New Territories South | New Territories North-west | New Territories West (LC4) | | | | | | New Territories North |
| GCs | New Territories South | New Territories North-west | New Territories West (LC4) | | | | | | New Territories North West |
| GCs | New Territories South | New Territories West | New Territories West (LC4) | | | | | | New Territories North West |
| GCs | New Territories South | New Territories Central | New Territories West (LC4) | | | | | | New Territories North West |
| GCs | New Territories West | New Territories Central | New Territories West (LC4) | | | | | | New Territories North West |
| GCs | New Territories West | New Territories South | New Territories West (LC4) | | | | | | New Territories South West |
| GCs | New Territories West | New Territories South-west | New Territories West (LC4) | | | | | | New Territories South West |

== 2021 electoral reform ==
20 seats of the Legislative Council are returned by geographical constituencies (GC) through single non-transferable vote with a district magnitude of 2 ("binomial system"). The binomial system was instituted by the Standing Committee of the National People's Congress in its amendment to Annex 2 of the Basic Law on 30 March 2021.

The proportional representation system used between 1998 and 2016 was scrapped. The reduction of the number of members returned by geographic constituencies has been described as "significantly curbing democratic representation in Hong Kong's institutions". These changes have been described as a shift in power away from Hong Kong's urban core and towards the outer, less densely populated regions closer to mainland China, where pro-Beijing candidates tend to fare better.

10 geographical constituencies were established for the 2021 election:

| Geographical constituency | Number of voters | Number of seats | Voting system |
|---|---|---|---|
| Hong Kong Island East | 424,849 | 2 | Single non-transferable vote |
| Hong Kong Island West | 374,795 | 2 | Single non-transferable vote |
| Kowloon East | 475,223 | 2 | Single non-transferable vote |
| Kowloon West | 381,484 | 2 | Single non-transferable vote |
| Kowloon Central | 454,595 | 2 | Single non-transferable vote |
| New Territories South East | 472,751 | 2 | Single non-transferable vote |
| New Territories North | 431,604 | 2 | Single non-transferable vote |
| New Territories North West | 468,752 | 2 | Single non-transferable vote |
| New Territories South West | 510,558 | 2 | Single non-transferable vote |
| New Territories North East | 478,252 | 2 | Single non-transferable vote |

== See also ==
- Elections in Hong Kong
- Hong Kong legislative elections
- List of constituencies of Hong Kong
- Party-list proportional representation
