= New Territories South-west (1995 constituency) =

- Former Geographical constituency for the Legislative Council of Hong Kong
- Boundary of New Territories South-west in Hong Kong
- District: Southern Kwai Tsing District; Islands District
- Region: New Territories
- Electorate: 113,799

Former constituency
- Created: 1995
- Abolished: 1997
- Created from: New Territories South
- Replaced by: New Territories West

New Territories South-west was a geographical constituencies in the election for the Legislative Council of Hong Kong in 1995, which elects one member of the Legislative Council using the first-past-the-post voting system. The constituency covers southern part of Kwai Tsing District (including Tsing Yi) and Islands District in New Territories.

The constituency was merged into the New Territories West constituency in 1998 after the handover of Hong Kong a year before.

== Returned members ==
Elected members are as follows:

Election	Member	Party
1995	Lee Wing-tat	Democratic

== Election results ==
1995 Legislative Council election: New Territories South-west
Party	Candidate	Votes	%	±%
Democratic	Lee Wing-tat	29,801	65.35	
ADPL	Ting Yin-wah	15,798	34.65	
Majority		14,003	30.70	
Total valid votes		45,599	100.00	
Rejected ballots		450		
Turnout		46,049	34.97	
Registered electors		131,698		
Democratic win (new seat)				
