= Lee Wing-tat =

Hong Kong politician (born 1955)

- 李永達
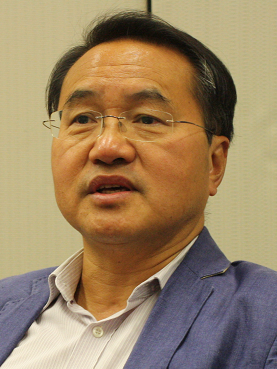
- Lee in 2015

Chairman of the Democratic Party
- In office 12 December 2004 – 17 December 2006
- Preceded by: Yeung Sum
- Succeeded by: Albert Ho

Member of the Legislative Council of Hong Kong
- In office 9 October 1991 – 31 July 1995
- Preceded by: New constituency
- Succeeded by: Constituency abolished
- Constituency: New Territories South
- In office 11 October 1995 – 30 June 1997
- Preceded by: New constituency
- Succeeded by: Replaced by Provisional Legislative Council
- Constituency: New Territories South-west
- In office 1 July 1998 – 30 June 2000
- Preceded by: New parliament
- Succeeded by: Albert Chan
- Constituency: New Territories West
- In office 1 October 2004 – 30 September 2012
- Preceded by: New seat
- Succeeded by: Michael Tien
- Constituency: New Territories West

Personal details
- Born: 25 December 1955 (age 70) Hong Kong
- Party: Association for Democracy and People's Livelihood (1986–1990); United Democrats (1990–94); Democratic Party (1994–2022)
- Spouse: Josephine Chan Shu-ying
- Education: St. Paul's College; University of Hong Kong
- Occupation: Politician

Lee Wing-tat
- Traditional Chinese: 李永達
- Simplified Chinese: 李永达
Transcriptions
Standard Mandarin
- Hanyu Pinyin: Lǐ Yǒngdá
Yue: Cantonese
- Yale Romanization: Léih Wíhng Taat
- Jyutping: Lei^{5} Wing^{5} Daat^{6}

Lee Wing-tat (Chinese: 李永達; born 25 December 1955) is a former Member of the Legislative Council of Hong Kong (LegCo), returned by direct election as representative of the New Territories West constituency. He was the former third Chairman of the Democratic Party (DP). He is seen as a conservative inside the party.

== Early life ==
A Hakka, Lee was elected vice-chairman of the Hong Kong University Students' Union in 1979. He graduated from the Faculty of Science of the University of Hong Kong with a pass. He first participated in politics in the 1980s and was the vice-chairman of the Association for Democracy and People's Livelihood (ADPL). He was elected to the District Council and the Regional Council in 1985 and 1986 respectively. He was a founding member of the Hong Kong Alliance in Support of Patriotic Democratic Movements of China.

In 1989, during the visit of Geoffrey Howe to Hong Kong, Lee protested at the conference and called Howe's speech "bullshit".

Lee left the ADPL and formed the United Democrats of Hong Kong, which developed into the Democratic Party in 1994. He was elected to the Legco in the same year. He once lost his seat in the 2000 election but was re-elected in 2004. He was vice-chairman of Democratic Party from 2002 to 2004 and was elected chairman at the sixth AGM of the DP in succession to Yeung Sum. His challenger for the Chairman's post, Chan King-ming, was elected vice-chairman instead.

== Chairmanship of Democratic Party ==
=== Chief Executive Election ===
In May 2005, Lee declared his intention to run in the Hong Kong Chief Executive Election, but only received 52 nominations and thus failed to get on the ballot. As a result, he withdrew from the election on 15 June. His participation in the election faced great criticisms within the party and the pro-democracy camp.

=== Criticisms ===
Lee was criticized for suppressing the second-tier members and "Young Turks" of the party. In early 2006, someone alleged to the Apple Daily that some senior members were involved in spying activities of China. The "suspects" were all Young Turks and included vice-chairman Chan King Ming and Gary Fan. The Young Turks later held a press conference to criticise the list of "suspects", with some even directly naming Lee as responsible.

=== Departure ===
Lee did not seek a second term as party chairman in the party's internal elections in December 2006.

== Views, policy positions and Legco voting ==
In June 2010, he voted with the party in favour of the government's 2012 constitutional reform package, which included the late amendment by the Democratic Party – accepted by the Beijing government – to hold a popular vote for five new District Council functional constituencies.

Political offices
New title	Member of the Kwai Tsing District Board; Representative for Kwai Chung East; 1985–1991	Succeeded by Tam King-wah
Preceded by John Ho Tung-ching	Chairman of the Kwai Tsing District Board; 1988–1991	Succeeded by Leung Kwong-cheong
New constituency	Member of the Kwai Tsing District Board; Representative for Shek Lei North; 1991–1994	Succeeded by Chan Ngai
Preceded by Sin Chung-kai	Member of the Kwai Tsing District Council; Representative for Lai Wah; 2003–2011	Succeeded by Chu Lai-ling
Legislative Council of Hong Kong
New constituency	Member of Legislative Council; Representative for New Territories South; 1991–1995; Served alongside: Albert Chan	Succeeded by Himself as Representative for New Territories South-west
Preceded by Himself as Representative for New Territories South	Member of Legislative Council; Representative for New Territories South-west; 1995–1997	Replaced by Provisional Legislative Council
New parliament	Member of Legislative Council; Representative for New Territories West; 1998–2000	Succeeded by Albert Chan
New seat	Member of Legislative Council; Representative for New Territories West; 2004–2012	Succeeded by Michael Tien
Party political offices
Preceded by Yeung Sum	Vice Chairperson of Democratic Party; 2000–2004; With: Law Chi-kwong (2000–2002); Albert Ho (2002–2004)	Succeeded by Chan King-ming
Preceded by Yeung Sum	Chairperson of Democratic Party; 2004–2006	Succeeded by Albert Ho
Preceded by Lam Cheuk-ting	Vice Chairperson of Democratic Party; 2021–2022; With: Edith Leung (2021-2022)	Incumbent
