= Kowloon South-west (1995 constituency) =

- Former Geographical constituency for the Legislative Council of Hong Kong
- Boundary of Kowloon South-west in Hong Kong
- District: Yau Tsim Mong District
- Region: Kowloon
- Electorate: 100,314

Former constituency
- Created: 1995
- Abolished: 1997
- Created from: Kowloon West
- Replaced by: Kowloon West

Kowloon South-west was a geographical constituencies in the election for the Legislative Council of Hong Kong in 1995, which elects one member of the Legislative Council using the first-past-the-post voting system. The constituency covers Yau Tsim Mong District in Kowloon.

The constituency was replaced by the Kowloon West constituency in 1998 after the handover of Hong Kong a year before.

== Returned members ==
Elected members are as follows:

Election	Member	Party
1995	James To	Democratic

== Election results ==
1995 Legislative Council election: Kowloon South-west
Party	Candidate	Votes	%	±%
Democratic	James To Kun-sun	17,731	66.17	
ADPL	Daniel Wong Kwok-tung	4,929	18.39	
Independent	Kingsley Sit Ho-yin	2,656	9.91	
Independent	Helen Chung Yee-fong	1,482	5.53	
Majority		12,802	47.78	
Total valid votes		26,798	100.00	
Rejected ballots		289		
Turnout		27,087	27.00	
Registered electors		100,314		
Democratic win (new seat)				
