= New Territories West (1995 constituency) =

- Former Geographical constituency for the Legislative Council of Hong Kong
- Boundary of New Territories West in Hong Kong
- District: North-western Tuen Mun District
- Region: New Territories
- Electorate: 137,316

Former constituency
- Created: 1995
- Abolished: 1997
- Created from: New Territories West
- Replaced by: New Territories West

New Territories West was a geographical constituency in the election for the Legislative Council of Hong Kong in 1995, which elects one member of the Legislative Council using the first-past-the-post voting system. The constituency covers north-western part of Tuen Mun District in New Territories.

The constituency was merged into the New Territories West constituency in 1998 after the handover of Hong Kong a year before.

== Returned members ==
Elected members are as follows:

Election	Member	Party
1995	Albert Ho	Democratic

== Election results ==
1995 Legislative Council election: New Territories West
Party	Candidate	Votes	%	±%
Democratic	Ho Chun-yan	25,255	54.23	
ADPL	Yim Tin-sang	15,166	32.56	
Independent	Chan Wan-sang	6,152	13.21	
Majority		10,089	21.67	
Total valid votes		46,573	100.00	
Rejected ballots		342		
Turnout		46,915	34.17	
Registered electors		137,316		
Democratic win (new seat)				
