= Albert Chan =

Hong Kong politician

Albert Chan Wai-yip
- 陳偉業
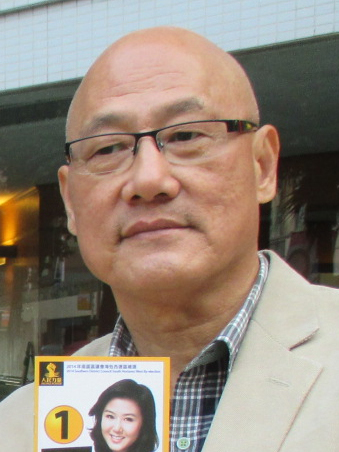

Member of the Legislative Council
- In office 17 May 2010 – 30 September 2016
- Succeeded by: Cheng Chung-tai
- Constituency: New Territories West
- In office 1 October 2000 – 28 January 2010
- Constituency: New Territories West
- In office 1 October 1995 – 30 June 1997
- Preceded by: New constituency
- Succeeded by: Replaced by Provisional Legislative Council
- Constituency: New Territories Central
- In office 9 October 1991 – 30 September 1995
- Preceded by: New constituency
- Succeeded by: Constituency abolished
- Constituency: New Territories South

Personal details
- Born: 3 March 1955 (age 71) Hong Kong
- Party: People Power (2011–)
- Other political affiliations: ADPL (1986–90); United Democrats (1990–94); Democratic (1994–2002); LSD (2006–11)
- Spouse: Lo Kit-mui
- Education: University of Manitoba (BA, BSW); University of British Columbia (MSW)
- Occupation: Legislative Councillor formerly social worker

Albert Chan Wai-yip
- Traditional Chinese: 陳偉業
- Simplified Chinese: 陈伟业
Transcriptions
Standard Mandarin
- Hanyu Pinyin: Chén Wěiyè
Yue: Cantonese
- Jyutping: Can^{4} Wai^{5} Jip^{6}

Albert Chan Wai-yip (Chinese: 陳偉業; born 3 March 1955, Hong Kong), also known by his nickname "Big Piece", is a former member of the Legislative Council of Hong Kong representing the New Territories West constituency. He has served as a legislator from 1991 to 2016 except for the periods 1997–2000 and Jan–May 2010. Chan, formerly a social worker, was a member of the Tsuen Wan District Council.

== Political career ==
In 1986, together with Lee Wing-tat, he founded the Hong Kong Association for Democracy and People's Livelihood. From 1994–2002 he was a member of the Democratic Party. In 2006 he co-founded the League of Social Democrats but resigned in 2011 over differences with the then leadership to form People Power with fellow legislator Wong Yuk-man. He is active in grass roots issues and believes that the government is not genuinely committed to the electoral reform promised in the Hong Kong Basic Law.

=== 2010 Five Constituencies Referendum ===
On 29 January 2010, Chan, together with four other lawmakers (two from Civic Party, two from LSD) Alan Leong, Tanya Chan, Leung Kwok-hung and Wong Yuk-man, resigned their seats in the Legislative Council. They intended that the popular vote in the by-elections triggered by their resignations would act as a de facto referendum on electoral reform, pressing the PRC Government into allowing universal suffrage in Hong Kong in compliance with Hong Kong's constitution, the Basic Law. On 16 May 2010, he was re-elected as a lawmaker in the by-election.

=== People Power ===
In January 2011, Chan and fellow legislator Wong Yuk-man resigned from the League of Social Democrats over differences with the leadership over what stance to take towards the Democratic Party in the discussions over Hong Kong's political development. The move left the party and its remaining legislator, Leung Kwok-hung ('Long Hair') in a difficult position. They also said that factional fighting within the party has become so hostile that it was beyond their ability to rectify the situation.

With Wong, he went on to launch People Power, under which name he continues to sit in Legco. In 2011 regional elections, he went against Tuen Mun Lok tsui Constituency's candidate Albert Ho Chun-yan, the then-chairman of Democratic Party. However, he was defeated. In 2012 legislative elections, Chan was reelected for a seventh time. He chose to make way for the youngster in the 2016 Legislative Council election, standing as a second candidate of Wong Ho-ming of its ally League of Social Democrats under the banner of "radical democrats". The list received 28,529 votes and failed to retain the seat.

Legislative Council of Hong Kong
New constituency	Member of Legislative Council; Representative for New Territories South; 1991–1995; Served alongside: Lee Wing-tat	Succeeded by Himself as Representative for New Territories Central
Preceded by Himself as Representative for New Territories South	Member of Legislative Council; Representative for New Territories Central; 1995–1997	Replaced by Provisional Legislative Council
