= New Territories South (1991 constituency) =

- Former Geographical constituency for the Legislative Council of Hong Kong
- Boundary of New Territories South in Hong Kong
- District: Tsuen Wan District; Kwai Tsing District; Islands District
- Region: New Territories
- Electorate: 248,045

Former constituency
- Created: 1991
- Abolished: 1995
- Number of members: Two
- Replaced by: New Territories Central; New Territories South; New Territories South-west

New Territories South was a geographical constituency in the election for the Legislative Council of Hong Kong in 1991. It elected two members of the Legislative Council using the dual-seat constituency dual vote system. The constituency covered Tsuen Wan District, Kwai Tsing District and Islands District.

The constituency was divided and replaced by the New Territories Central, New Territories South, and New Territories South-west constituencies in 1995.

== Returned members ==
Elected members are as follows:

Election	Member	Party	Member	Party
1991	Lee Wing-tat	UDHK	Albert Chan	UDHK
1994	Lee Wing-tat	Democratic	Albert Chan	Democratic

== Election results ==
1991 Legislative Council election: New Territories South
Party	Candidate	Votes	%	±%
United Democrats	Lee Wing-tat	52,192	32.02	
United Democrats	Albert Chan Wai-yip	42,164	25.86	
NWSC	Leung Yiu-chung	38,568	23.66	
PHKS	Yeung Fuk-kwong	30,095	18.46	
Turnout		91,780	37.00	
Registered electors		248,045		
United Democrats win (new seat)				
United Democrats win (new seat)				
