= New Territories North-west (1995 constituency) =

- Former Geographical constituency for the Legislative Council of Hong Kong
- Boundary of New Territories North-west in Hong Kong
- District: Southern part of Yuen Long District
- Region: New Territories
- Electorate: 113,799

Former constituency
- Created: 1995
- Abolished: 1997
- Created from: New Territories West
- Replaced by: New Territories West

New Territories North-west was a geographical constituencies in the election for the Legislative Council of Hong Kong in 1995, which elects one member of the Legislative Council using the first-past-the-post voting system. The constituency covers most of the Yuen Long District (except San Tin and Fairview Park) in New Territories.

The constituency was merged into the New Territories West constituency in 1998 after the handover of Hong Kong a year before.

== Returned members ==
Elected members are as follows:

Election	Member	Party
1995	Zachary Wong	Democratic

== Election results ==
1995 Legislative Council election: New Territories North-west
Party	Candidate	Votes	%	±%
Democratic	Zachary Wong Wai-yin	21,527	50.07	
Independent	Tang Siu-tong	21,470	49.93	
Majority		57	0.06	
Total valid votes		42,997	100.00	
Rejected ballots		349		
Turnout		43,346	38.09	
Registered electors		113,799		
Democratic win (new seat)				
