= New Territories Central (1995 constituency) =

- Former Geographical constituency for the Legislative Council of Hong Kong
- Boundary of New Territories Central in Hong Kong
- District: North-western part of Tsuen Wan District; South-eastern part of Tuen Mun District
- Region: New Territories
- Electorate: 116,851

Former constituency
- Created: 1995
- Abolished: 1997
- Created from: New Territories South
- Replaced by: New Territories West

New Territories North-east was a geographical constituency in the election for the Legislative Council of Hong Kong in 1995, which elects one member of the Legislative Council using the first-past-the-post voting system. The constituency covers most of the Tsuen Wan District (except south-eastern part) and the south-eastern part of Tuen Mun District in New Territories.

The constituency was merged into the New Territories West constituency in 1998 after the handover of Hong Kong a year before.

== Returned members ==
Elected members are as follows:

Election	Member	Party
1995	Albert Chan	Democratic

== Election results ==
1995 Legislative Council election: New Territories Central
Party	Candidate	Votes	%	±%
Democratic	Albert Chan Wai-yip	25,303	74.79	
Independent	Tam Tai-on	4,433	13.10	
Independent	Ng Wai-kwong	4,097	12.11	
Majority		20,870	61.69	
Total valid votes		33,833	100.00	
Rejected ballots		479		
Turnout		34,312	29.36	
Registered electors		116,851		
Democratic win (new seat)				
