= Albert Ho =

Hong Kong politician

Albert Ho Chun-yan
- 何俊仁
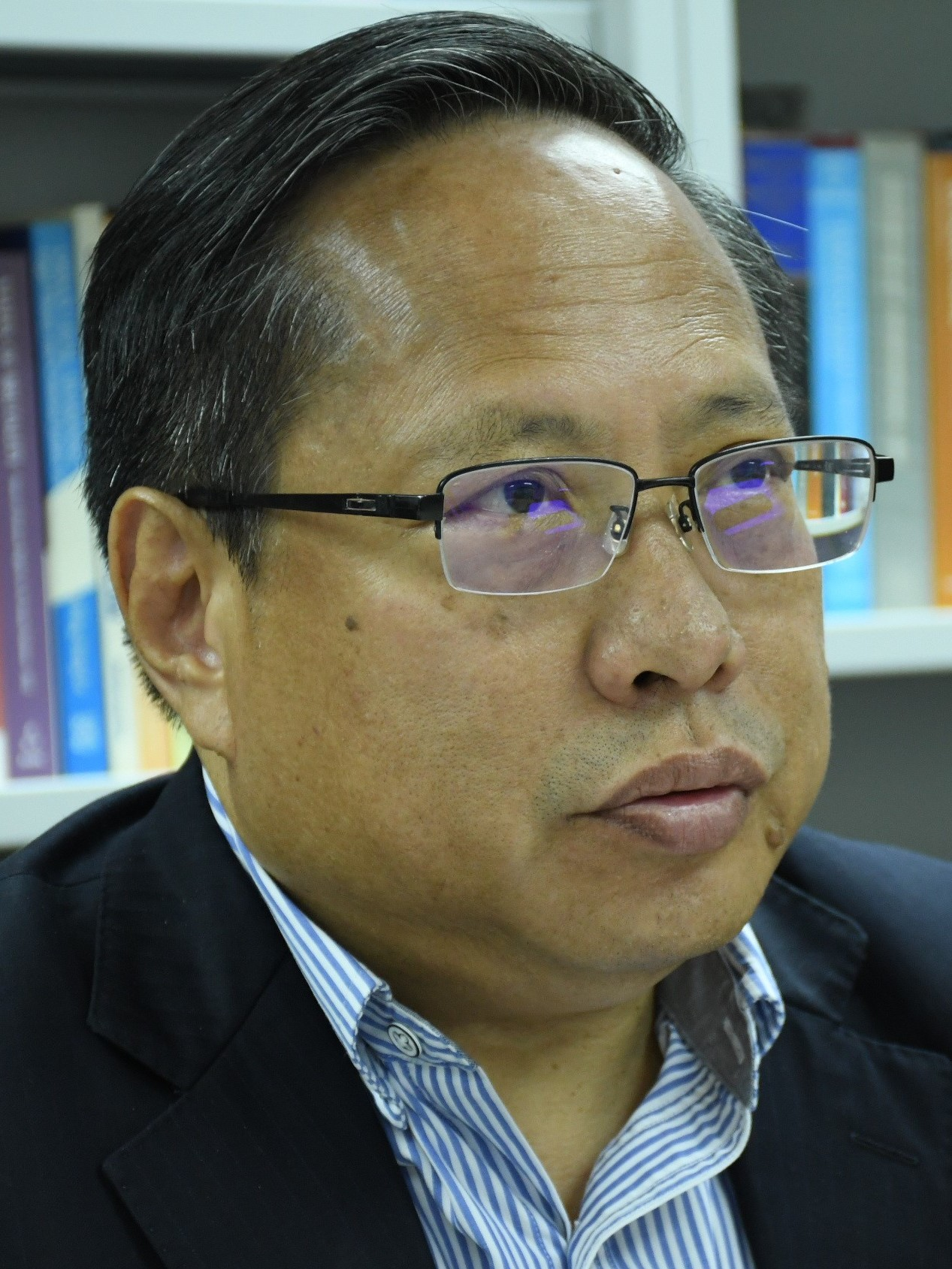
- Albert Ho in 2018

Chairman of the Democratic Party
- In office 17 December 2006 – 10 September 2012
- Preceded by: Lee Wing-tat
- Succeeded by: Emily Lau

Chairman of the Hong Kong Alliance in Support of Patriotic Democratic Movements of China
- In office 15 December 2014 – 8 December 2019
- Deputy: Richard Tsoi; Mak Hoi-wah; Chow Hang-tung
- Preceded by: Lee Cheuk-yan
- Succeeded by: Lee Cheuk-yan

Member of the Legislative Council
- In office 11 October 1995 – 30 June 1997
- Preceded by: New constituency
- Succeeded by: Replaced by Provisional Legislative Council
- Constituency: New Territories West
- In office 1 July 1998 – 30 September 2012
- Preceded by: New parliament
- Succeeded by: Kwok Ka-ki
- Constituency: New Territories West
- In office 1 October 2012 – 30 September 2016
- Preceded by: New constituency
- Succeeded by: Roy Kwong
- Constituency: District Council (Second)

Personal details
- Born: 1 December 1951 (age 74) British Hong Kong
- Party: Hong Kong Affairs Society (1985–90); United Democrats (1990–94); Democratic Party (1994–2025)
- Spouse: Tang Suk-yee
- Education: University of Hong Kong
- Occupation: Solicitor

Albert Ho Chun-yan
- Chinese: 何俊仁
Transcriptions
Standard Mandarin
- Hanyu Pinyin: Hé Jùnrén
Yue: Cantonese
- Yale Romanization: Hòh Jeun Yàhn
- Jyutping: Ho^{4} Zeon^{3} Jan^{4}

Albert Ho Chun-yan (Chinese: 何俊仁; born 1 December 1951) is a solicitor and politician in Hong Kong. He is the former chairman (2014–2019) and vice-chair (2019–2021) of the Hong Kong Alliance in Support of Patriotic Democratic Movements of China, and former chairman of the Democratic Party from 2006 to 2012. He is a solicitor and a former member of the Legislative Council of Hong Kong for District Council (Second) constituency. On 11 September 2026 he was jailed for five years and two months for incitement to subversion, over his role in the Hong Kong Alliance.

== Early life and education ==
Ho was born in what was then British Hong Kong on 1 December 1951 in a big family with six children. His father worked in a shipping company by day and as a translator by night, along with two other jobs that he had. Ho got his Bachelor of Laws with honors in the University of Hong Kong in 1974, and obtained a Postgraduate Certificate in Laws in 1975.

He attended lectures given by Hsu Kwan-san, a Chinese historian who later became a professor at the Chinese University of Hong Kong, whom Ho cited as influence for his political beliefs and Chinese national sentiment. During his college life, he developed his liberal ideals, got actively involved in student politics and campaigned for Mak Hoi-wah who ran for the Hong Kong University Students' Union against the Maoist nationalists who dominated the student union in the 1970s.

== Legal and early political career ==
Ho got admission to practice law in 1977 and was appointed a notary public of the common law in 1988. He was employed for Messrs. C.Y. Kwan & Co. as a solicitor for nearly 20 years, then left to set up his own law firm, Ho, Tse, Wai & Partners. His litigation experience varied from banking cases and commercial law to land law and matrimonial disputes, as well as in criminal and medical negligence cases. Albert Ho worked a number of human rights cases on a pro bono (undertaken voluntarily and without payment) for the pan-democracy camp.

Ho stepped into politics when he was first appointed to the Kowloon City District Board from 1982 to 1983. In 1985 he co-founded the Hong Kong Affairs Society (HKAS) to participate in the electoral politics during the transition period. During his spell as the leader of the HKAS, he demanded a faster pace of democratisation in Hong Kong and the safeguarding of freedom and way of life after the handover of Hong Kong to mainland China after 1997. In 1989, he co-founded the Hong Kong Alliance in Support of Patriotic Democratic Movements of China to support the Tiananmen protests of 1989 and was critical of the Beijing government's bloody crackdown. He became the third chairman of the Alliance since 2014, succeeding Lee Cheuk-yan.

He ran for the Urban Council in Kowloon City West in the 1986 municipal election but was defeated by incumbent Peter Chan Chi-kwan. He ran again in the 1991 Urban Council election in Southern District but was again losing to incumbent Joseph Chan Yuet-sut of the conservative Liberal Democratic Federation of Hong Kong. He was elected to the Regional Council in the municipal elections in 1995, receiving the largest number of votes in the Regional Council. He kept served on the council through 1997 until it was abolished by Chief Executive Tung Chee-hwa in 2000.

Ho was a member of the Tuen Mun District Council for Lok Tsui since the 1999 District Council election. He was targeted by the radical democrats, including Albert Chan of the People Power in the 2011 District Council election who opposed the Democrats' compromise with the Beijing officials on the 2012 constitutional reform proposals and in the 2015 District Council election by Civic Passion's Cheng Chung-tai. He kept the seat for 15 years but was defeated in 2015 by pro-Beijing lawyer Junius Ho in 2015 by a narrow margin of 277 votes.

== Legislative Councillor ==
In April 1990, Ho and other pro-democracy activists co-founded the United Democrats of Hong Kong (UDHK), the first major pro-democracy party in the city, of which he became the founding vice-chairman. The party transformed into today's Democratic Party in 1994 when he became a member of the party's first executive committee. In 1992, he ran for the by-election in New Territories West as his first attempt to the Legislative Council after incumbent Democrat Ng Ming-yum died of cancer. He was defeated by conservative rural leader Tang Siu-tong by only four percent of the votes. He ran again in New Territories West in 1995 Legislative Council election, receiving 54 percent of the popular vote.

He stepped down from the colonial legislature on 30 June 1997 on the eve of the handover of Hong Kong after the Beijing government dismantled the "through train" agreement of allowing the 1995 elected legislature to transition beyond 1997. The Democratic Party boycotted the Provisional Legislative Council controlled by Beijing and refused to take part in it. In November 1997, Ho was nominated by the Democratic Party to run for a seat in the National People's Congress, but excluded from competition when he failed to obtain the minimum number of nominations from the 400-strong Beijing-appointed election conference.

In the first Legislative Council election of the SAR period in 1998, Ho won a seat in the New Territories West with his party colleague Lee Wing-tat. With his strong basis in his strategic district Tuen Mun, he was re-elected in 2000 with one of the three Democratic Party tickets. Albert Chan who had a strong basis in Tsuen Wan was also elected at the expense of Lee Wing-tat. Ho was re-elected in 2004. After the election, he unsuccessfully challenged Rita Fan in the Legco presidential election.

On 20 August 2006, Ho was assaulted by three unidentified men using baseball bats and a baton in a McDonald's restaurant in Central, Hong Kong, after he had attended a protest against the government's plan to adopt a Goods and Services Tax. He suffered injuries to his head, arm and face, including a broken nose.

=== Democratic Party Chairman ===
Between 2004 and 2006 Ho was the vice-chairman of the Democratic Party. In December 2006, he was elected as party chairman in the leadership election, defeating Chan King-ming of the reformist faction. During his tenure, the party absorbed Emily Lau's The Frontier in 2008.

In June 2010, he led the Democratic Party delegation to the Liaison Office to negotiate the electoral reform package with the representatives of the Beijing government. The Beijing government eventually accepted the Democratic Party's modified proposal to allow five new directly elected District Council (Second) seats. The compromise sparked extreme discontent among the radical democrats and created a major unrest among the pan-democracy camp. He was challenged by radical democrat legislator Albert Chan in his Lok Tsui constituency in the following 2011 District Council election and barely retained his seat.

In the 2012 Legislative Council election, Ho ran in the newly created District Council (Second) constituency and was elected with 228,840 votes. However, his party continued being attacked by the radical democrats and received the worst result in history, retaining only six seats. Ho resigned as party chairman right after the election results came out and was replaced by Emily Lau as acting chairwoman.

=== 2012 Chief Executive bid ===
Albert Ho announced on 4 October 2011 that he would stand in the 2012 Chief Executive election, which is elected in a small-circle election dominated by pro-Beijing members. Having won the pan-democratic primary against Frederick Fung of the ADLP on 8 January 2012, Ho ran against the two pro-Beijing candidates, ex-convenor of the Executive Council Leung Chun-ying and former Chief Secretary Henry Tang. Out of the 1,132 EC votes, Ho came third with only 76; Leung Chun-ying was elected with 689 votes.

=== Snowden incident ===
In 2013, Ho grabbed international headlines after it was revealed that he had assisted Edward Snowden during the latter's stay in Hong Kong.

=== 2014 Hong Kong protests ===
In October 2014, during pro-democracy protests that began on 26 September, Ho said he was prepared to take a bullet if demonstrations turned violent. He did not support violence in the cause of democracy, but was willing to make a "sacrifice" on behalf of young people "because the future belongs to them."

== Post-legislator development ==
=== 2019–2020 Hong Kong protests ===
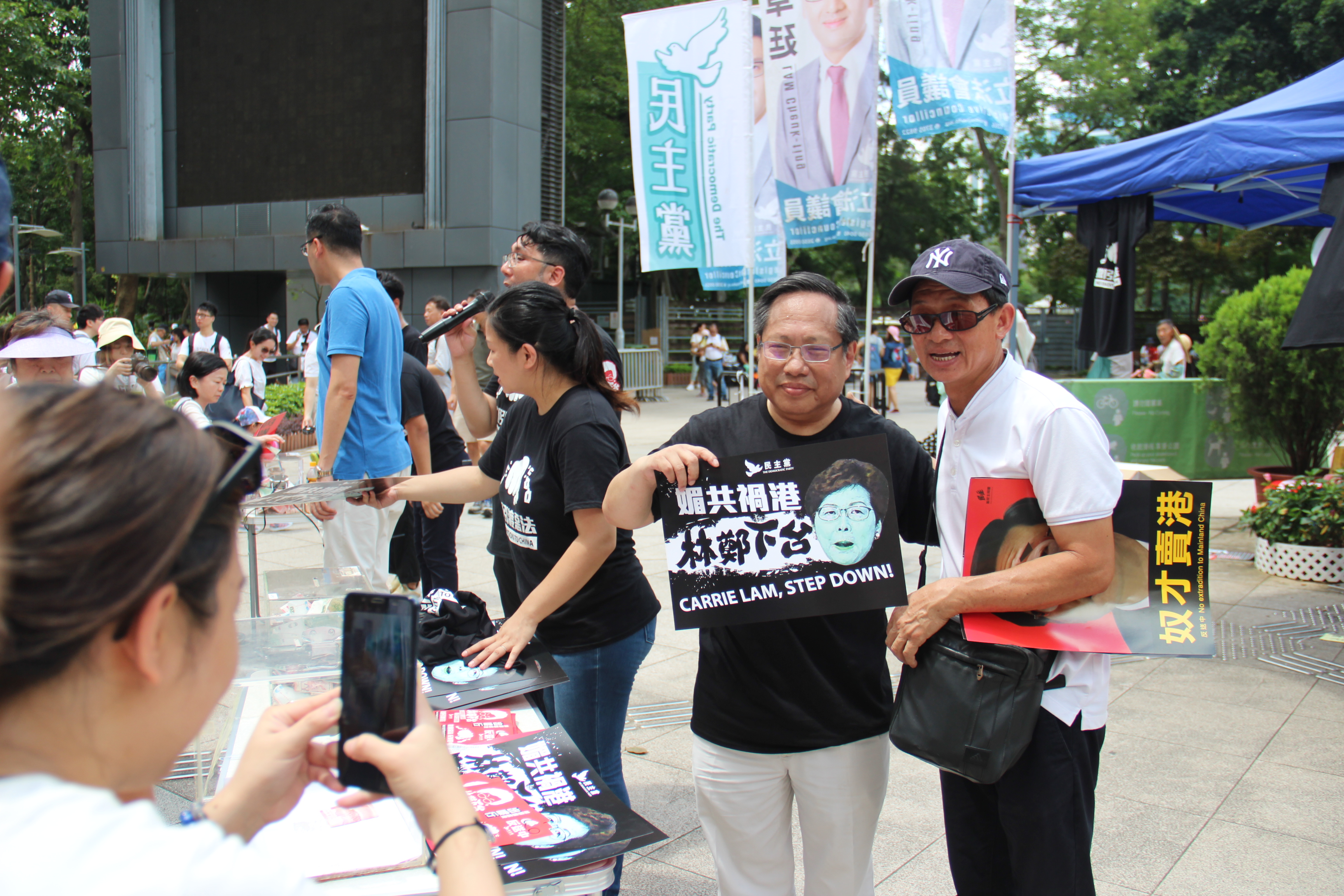
Albert Ho at the Hong Kong anti-extradition bill protests on 9 June 2019

Albert Ho continued to support the pro-democracy movement, and took part in the Hong Kong anti-extradition bill protests. On 18 April 2020, Ho was one of 15 Hong Kong high-profile democracy figures arrested on suspicion of organizing, publicizing or taking part in several unauthorized assemblies between August and October 2019 in the course of the anti-extradition bill protests. In May 2021, he was sentenced to two jail terms of 18 months each, to be served concurrently, for inciting and organizing a banned protest on China's National Day on 1 October 2019.

Ho was attacked by a group of men armed with metal rods at around 7pm on 19 September 2019 as he exited Tin Hau MTR station. He was followed by a black-clad group and beaten. Soon thereafter, several politicians from the pro-democracy camp – notably Roy Kwong, Stanley Ho Wai-hang of the Labour Party and Leung Kai-Qing were also attacked in the street. The involvement of organised crime was suspected by the Hong Kong Police Force.

On 21 August 2019, Ho was named by Chinese state media as one of the "Gang of Four who bring ruin to Hong Kong" alongside Apple Daily owner Jimmy Lai, Democratic Party founding chairman Martin Lee and former Chief Secretary Anson Chan.

=== Imposition of national security law ===
Soon after the June 2020 imposition of the Hong Kong national security law by the PRC Standing Committee of the National People's Congress, Ho told The Daily Telegraph that he feared that "people like him" may face "difficulties in the times to come" as global banks like Credit Suisse, HSBC, Julius Baer and UBS were in the process of "broadening scrutiny" to "screen clients for political and government ties" and subjecting pro-democrats to "additional diligence requirements". Said Ho: "There’s not much you can do, actually, unless you cease all your financial and banking activities in Hong Kong."

=== Resignation from civic groups and sentencing ===
In September 2021, Ho resigned from his leadership positions within the Hong Kong Alliance, the China Human Rights Lawyers Concern Group, and the New School for Democracy. The Alliance had come under heavy attack by authorities at that time, with two national security investigations underway against it and its lead members; earlier that month, before his resignations, Ho had pleaded guilty to taking part in or inciting others to participate in the 2020 Tiananmen Massacre vigil. Ho said in court, to applauding spectators, that he and eleven others who pleaded guilty for the same offence were "on the right side of history". Ho was sentenced on 15 September 2021 to a total of 10 months in prison after having been found guilty of the participation and incitement charges relating to the 2020 vigil. A first bail application by Ho over a charge of subversion of state power in relation to his role in the Hong Kong Alliance was rejected on 20 July 2022, but a second one was granted on 22 August 2022. On 11 September 2026, Ho was sentenced to five years and two months in jail over the incitement to subversion case. He had been the only one of the three Hong Kong Alliance leaders who had pleaded guilty.

=== Rearrest ===
On 21 March 2023, Ho was rearrested after having been released on bail in August 2022 in order to receive treatment for lung cancer. The bail was granted on the condition that it would be revoked if he reportedly committed any acts that endangered national security.

On 12 April 2024 Albert Ho received from the Hong Kong Court of Final Appeal a suspended sentence following conviction for taking part in an unauthorised procession in August 2019. The decision generated considerable adverse publicity for Lord Neuberger (former President of the UK Supreme Court) for his participation in the judicial panel.

Ho had by then also been convicted for two counts of knowingly taking part in an unauthorised assembly, three counts of incitement to knowingly take part in an unauthorised assembly, and one count of organising an unauthorised assembly. He had pleaded guilty to having taken part in two unauthorised protests in October 2019 besides the 2020 Tiananmen vigil, and been sentenced to jail terms between 10 and 18 months, to be partly served concurrently. In November 2025, Ho was suspended as notary for seven years over his convictions linked to the two protests and vigil.

On 11 September 2026 he was jailed for five years and two months for incitement to subversion, over his role in the Hong Kong Alliance.

Party political offices
New political party	Vice Chairperson of United Democrats of Hong Kong; 1990–1994; With: Yeung Sum	Merged into Democratic Party
Preceded by Lau Chin-shek	Vice Chairperson of Democratic Party; 1999–2000; With: Yeung Sum	Succeeded by Law Chi-kwong; Lee Wing-tat
Preceded by Law Chi-kwong	Vice Chairperson of Democratic Party; 2002–2006; With: Lee Wing-tat (2002–2004); Chan King-ming (2004–2006)	Succeeded by Sin Chung-kai; Tik Chi-yuen
Preceded by Lee Wing-tat	Chairperson of Democratic Party; 2006–2012	Succeeded by Emily Lau
Legislative Council of Hong Kong
Preceded by Tang Siu-tong	Member of Legislative Council; Representative for New Territories West; 1995–1997	Replaced by Provisional Legislative Council
New parliament	Member of Legislative Council; Representative for New Territories West; 1998–2012	Succeeded by Kwok Ka-ki
New constituency	Member of Legislative Council; Representative for District Council (Second); 2012–2016	Succeeded by Roy Kwong
Preceded by James Tien	Senior Member in Legislative Council; 2008–2016	Succeeded by James To
Political offices
Preceded by Lo Chun-hung	Member of Tuen Mun District Council; Representative for Lok Tsui; 2000–2015	Succeeded by Junius Ho
Non-profit organization positions
Preceded by Lee Cheuk-yan	Chairman of the Hong Kong Alliance in Support of Patriotic Democratic Movements of China; 2014–2019	Succeeded by Lee Cheuk-yan
