= New Territories South (1995 constituency) =

Geographical constituency in Hong Kong

- Former Geographical constituency for the Legislative Council of Hong Kong
- Boundary of New Territories South in Hong Kong
- District: South-eastern Tsuen Wan District; Northern Kwai Tsing District
- Region: New Territories
- Electorate: 137,318

Former constituency
- Created: 1995
- Abolished: 1997
- Created from: New Territories South
- Replaced by: New Territories West

New Territories South was a geographical constituency in the election for the Legislative Council of Hong Kong in 1995, which elects one member of the Legislative Council using the first-past-the-post voting system. The constituency covers south-eastern part of Tsuen Wan District and northern part of Kwai Tsing District in New Territories.

The constituency was merged into the New Territories West constituency in 1998 after the handover of Hong Kong a year before.

== Returned members ==
Elected members are as follows:

Election	Member	Party
1995	Sin Chung-kai	Democratic

== Election results ==
1995 Legislative Council election: New Territories South
Party	Candidate	Votes	%	±%
Democratic	Sin Chung-kai	26,048	70.74	
Independent	Hui Chiu-fai	8,179	22.21	
Pioneer	Lam Chi-leung	2,594	7.04	
Majority		17,869	48.53	
Total valid votes		36,821	100.00	
Rejected ballots		567		
Turnout		37,388	27.23	
Registered electors		137,318		
Democratic win (new seat)				
