= 5th Legislative Council of Hong Kong =

2012–2016 Legislative Council of Hong Kong

←	4th Legislative Council	6th Legislative Council	→
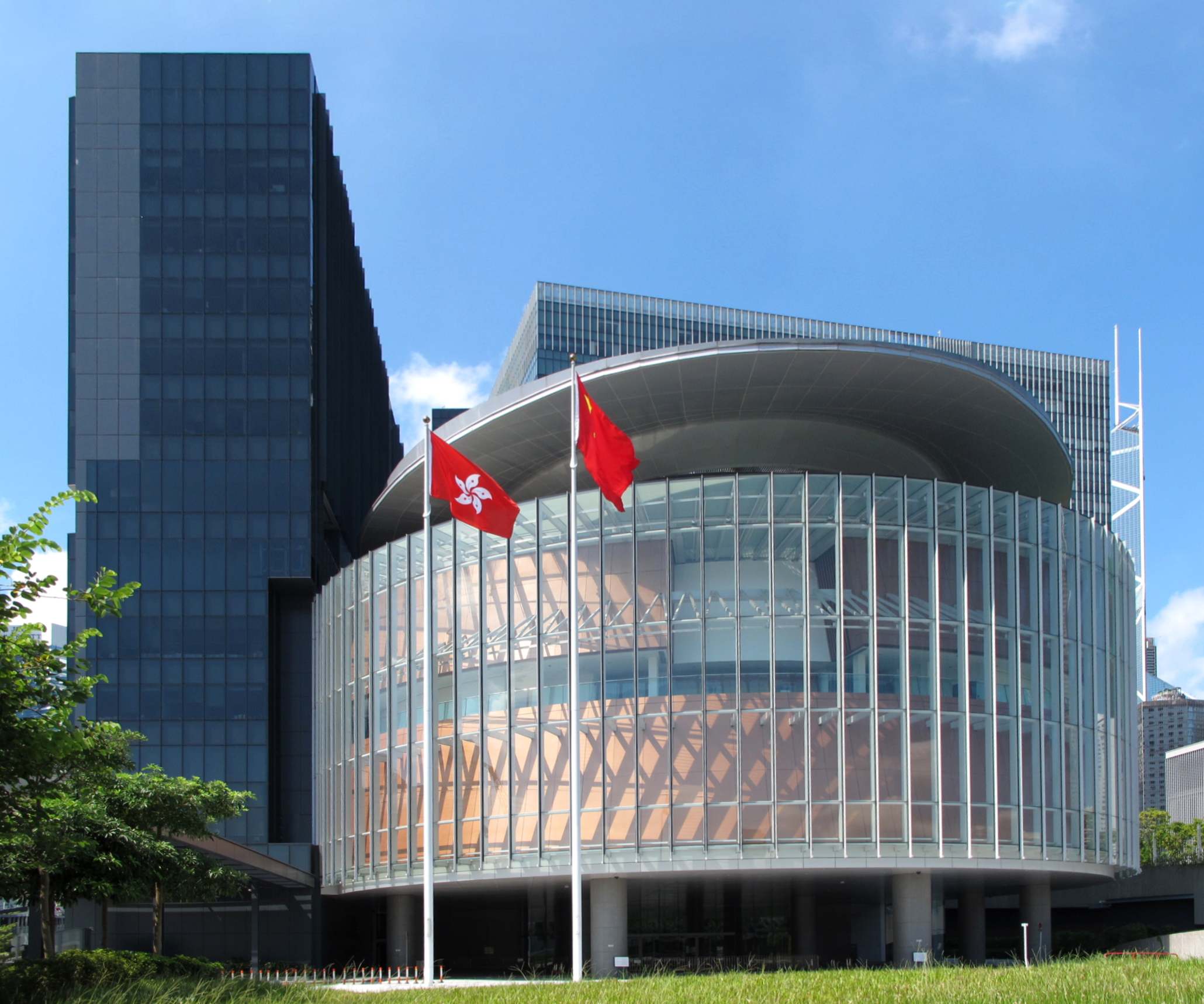

Overview
- Legislative body: Legislative Council
- Jurisdiction: Hong Kong
- Meeting place: Legislative Council Complex
- Term: 1 October 2012 – 30 September 2016
- Government: Leung government
- Website: legco.gov.hk/
- Members: 70 members
- President: Tsang Yok-sing (DAB)
- Party control: Pro-Beijing camp

The Fifth Legislative Council of Hong Kong was the fifth meeting of the legislative branch of the Hong Kong Special Administrative Region Government. The membership of the LegCo is based on the 2012 election. The term of the session is from 1 October 2012 to 30 September 2016, during the term in office of the Chief Executive Leung Chun-ying. Due to the new arrangements agreed in a contentious LegCo vote in 2010, the session consists of the new total of 70 seats in LegCo, ten more than previously, with 35 members elected in geographical constituencies through direct elections, and 35 members in functional constituencies, in which five District Council (Second) functional constituency seats each represent all 18 District councils of Hong Kong voted for by all resident voters in Hong Kong (who did not have a vote in any other functional constituency). The Democratic Alliance for the Betterment and Progress of Hong Kong remained the largest party while the pan-democrats secured the one-third crucial minority. Notable new members of the LegCo members include Gary Fan from the new established party Neo Democrats and first openly gay councillor, People Power's Ray Chan Chi-chuen.

== Major events ==
=== 2012–13 ===
- 8 November 2012: Motion on "Equal rights for people of different sexual orientations", moved by Cyd Ho, was negatived.
- 13 December 2012: Motion on "Vote of no confidence in the Chief Executive", moved by the Democratic Party's Wu Chi-wai, in response to the illegal structures scandal of Leung Chun-ying's residences was voted down by the Pro-Beijing camp.
- 16 January 2013: Chief Executive Leung Chun-ying presented his first policy address to the council.
- 27 February 2013: The 2013–14 Budget Speech was delivered by the Financial Secretary, Mr John C Tsang, in the Legislative Council.
- 24 April – 21 May 2013 : Five radical pan-democrats People Power and League of Social Democrats started filibustering by moving a total of 710 amendments on the Budget Appropriation Bill debate, to press for a universal pension scheme and a HK$10,000 cash handout. The government warned that the service would shut down if the budget bill do not pass. President of the Legislative Council Jasper Tsang ordered to end the filibuster on 13 May after 55 hours spent to debate 17 of the 148 amendments. The Appropriation Bill was passed on 21 May 2013 with 684 amendments negatived.

=== 2013–14 ===
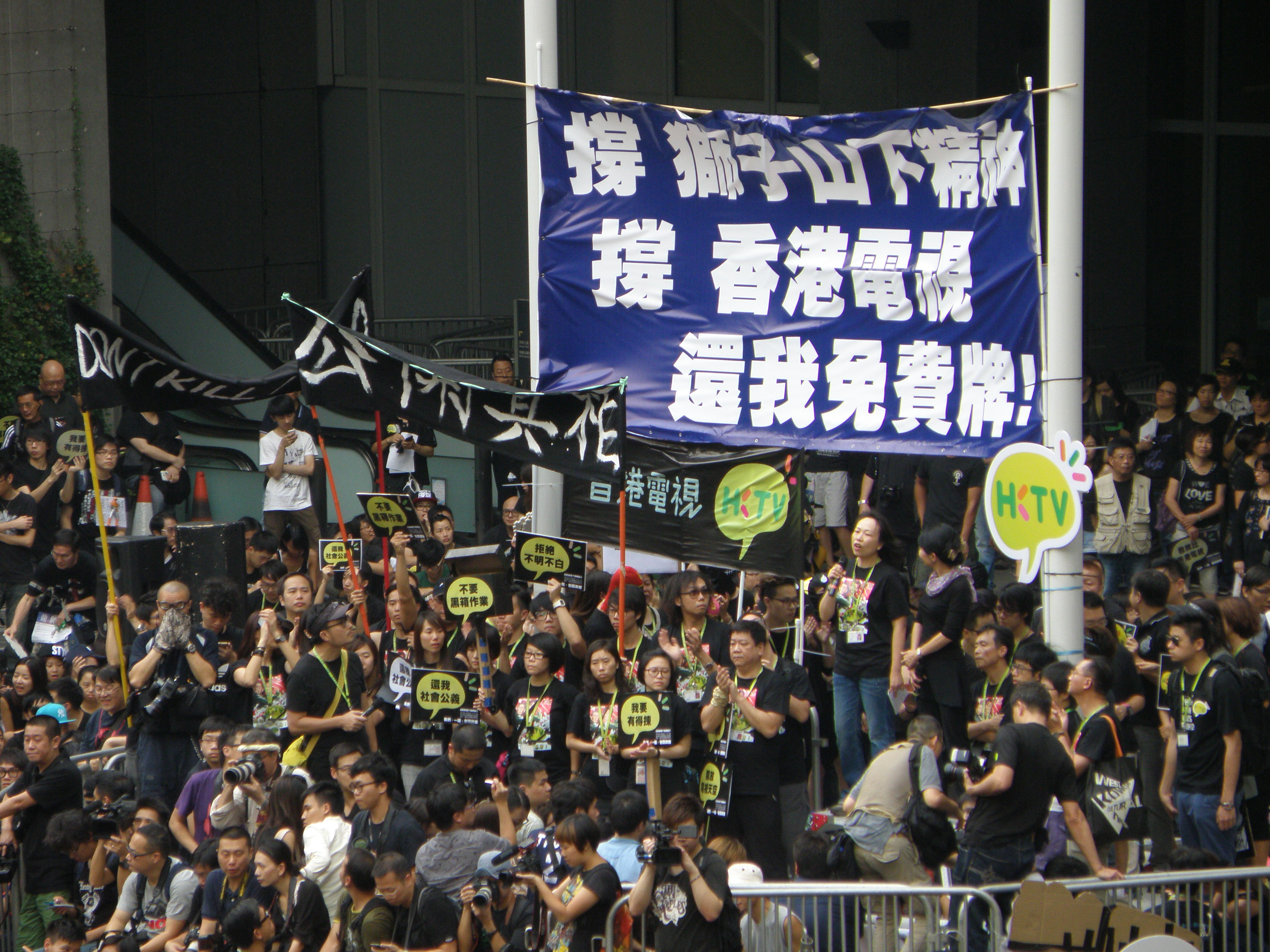
Protests against the HKSAR government's decision to refuse a free-to-air broadcast licence to Hong Kong Television.

- 9–10 October 2013: Motion under the Legislative Council (Powers and Privileges) Ordinance, moved by Kwok Ka-ki of the Civic Party, to seek to appoint a select committee to inquire into the incident of the Secretary for Development Paul Chan Mo-po owning farmland located in the areas of the North East New Territories New Development Areas Project was negatived.
- 16 October 2013: Second attempt of the motion on "Vote of no confidence in the Chief Executive" by the pan democrats was negatived.
- 8 November 2013: Charles Mok moved a motion under Legislative Council (Power and Privileges) Ordinance to order the Secretary for Commerce and Economic Development Gregory So to attend before the Panel on Information Technology and Broadcasting to give evidence in the processes of vetting and approval of domestic free television programme service licence applications, after the application for the license of the Hong Kong Television Network Limited being negatived by the Executive Council. The motion and the amendment by Civic Party's Dennis Kwok were defeated. Thousands of protestors gathered outside of the Legislative Council building showing support for the Hong Kong Television Network Limited.
- 19 March 2014: Motion moved by Claudia Mo of the Civic Party under the Legislative Council (Powers and Privileges) Ordinance to appoint a select committee to inquire into the immediate termination of the contract of Li Wei-ling, a radio host of Hong Kong Commercial Broadcasting Company Limited ("Commercial Radio"), and the alleged political interference by the government with the editorial independence of Commercial Radio, was negatived.

=== 2015–16 ===
- 11 March 2016: The HK$19.6 billion extra funds for controversial Guangzhou–Shenzhen–Hong Kong Express Rail Link (XRL) project was passed by the Financial Committee in a sudden vote despite fierce protests and filibustering from the pan-democratic legislators. The pan-democrats questioned the procedure set by the acting chairman Chan Kam-lam who only approved 36 of the 19 pan-democratic legislators' 1,262 motions.

== Major legislation ==
=== Enacted ===
- 17 April 2013: Import and Export (General) (Amendment) Regulation 2013
- 21 May 2013: Appropriation Bill 2013
- 22 May 2013: District Council (Amendment) Bill 2013

=== Proposed ===
- 18 June 2015: Motion Concerning the Amendment to the Method for the Selection of the Chief Executive of Hong Kong Special Administrative Region
- 4 March 2016: Copyright (Amendment) Bill 2014

=== 2015 Hong Kong electoral reform ===
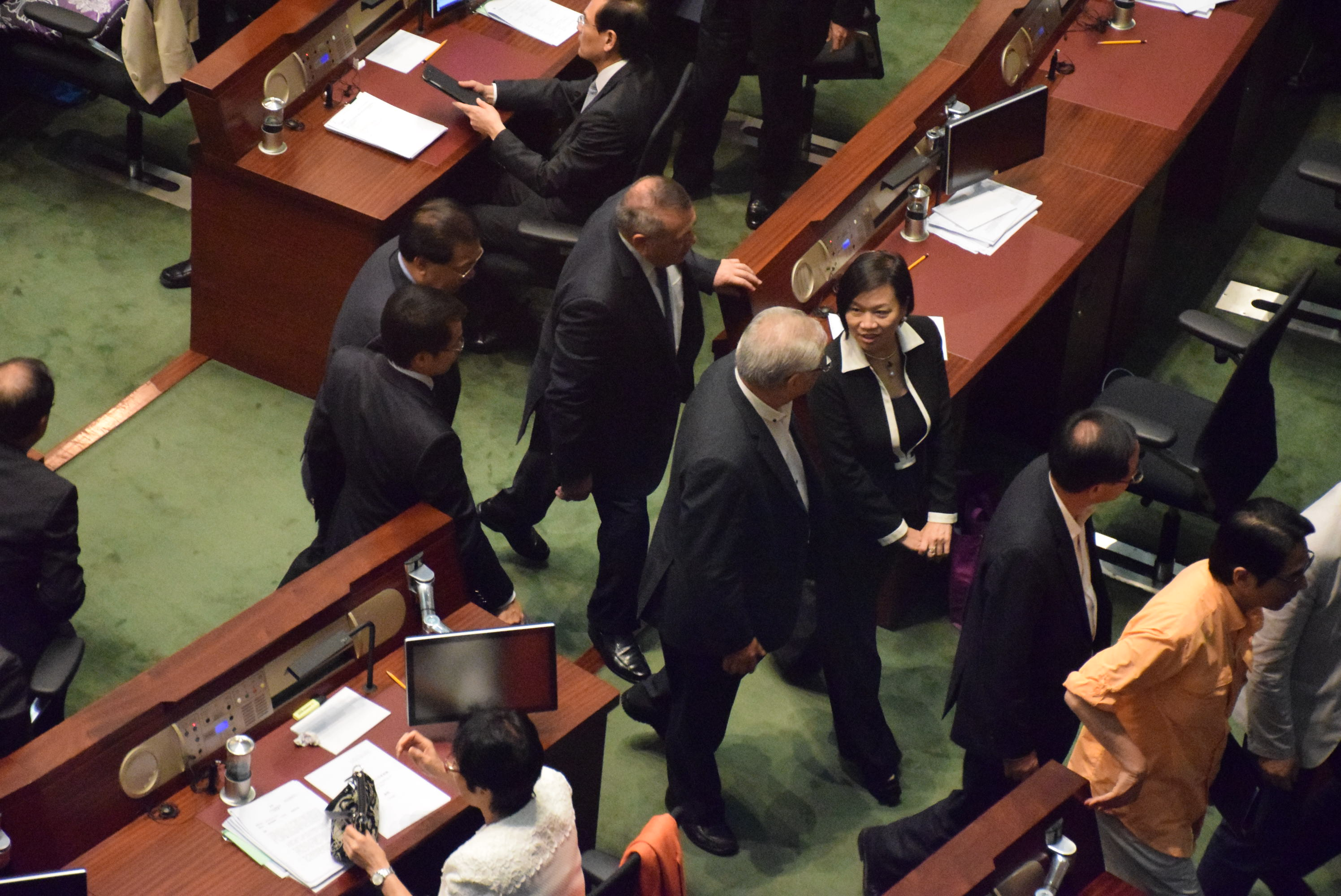
Pro-Beijing legislators walked out right before the historic vote.

On 18 June 2015, right before the vote, pro-Beijing legislator Jeffrey Lam Kin-fung led a walk-out of members of the Democratic Alliance for the Betterment and Progress of Hong Kong (DAB), the Business and Professionals Alliance for Hong Kong (BPA), most members of the Hong Kong Federation of Trade Unions (FTU) and other pro-Beijing legislators, leaving five Liberal Party legislators, Chan Yuen-han of the FTU and two other pro-Beijing independents remained in the chamber. The government's reform proposal failed as 8 legislators voted in favour and 28 votes against. All 27 pan democrats who had vowed to vote down the reform did so, as did one pro-Beijing legislator Leung Ka-lau representing the Medical constituency. Lam explained that the walk-out was an impromptu attempt to delay the division after the chairman denied his request for a 15-minute recess so that his party member Lau Wong-fat, who was delayed, could cast his vote in favour of the Beijing-backed reforms. However, enough legislators remained in the chamber that quorum was met and the proposal was voted down while most of the pro-Beijing legislators were outside. Nine pro-Beijing legislators, including five Liberal Party members, stayed behind out of confusion, and only eight of them voted in favour of the package, giving the rest of the world the false impression there was no support for the blueprint.

== Composition ==
Affiliation	Election	At dissolution
Democratic Alliance for the Betterment and Progress of Hong Kong	13	13
Business and Professionals Alliance for Hong Kong	0	7
Hong Kong Federation of Trade Unions	6	6
Liberal Party	5	5
New People's Party	2	2
Federation of Hong Kong and Kowloon Labour Unions	1	1
New Century Forum	1	1
Economic Synergy	3	0
Professional Forum	2	0
Independent	9	7
Total for Pro-Beijing camp	42	42
Civic Party	6	6
Democratic Party	6	6
Labour Party	4	4
People Power	3	2
Professional Commons	2	2
League of Social Democrats	1	1
Neighbourhood and Worker's Service Centre	1	1
Hong Kong Association for Democracy and People's Livelihood	1	1
Neo Democrats	1	1
Independent	2	3
Total for Pan-democracy camp	27	27
Non-aligned independent	1	1
Total	70	70

Note: Italic represents organisations that still function but become under another affiliation.

== Graphical representation of the Legislative Council ==

Current Legislative Council of Hong Kong seat composition by party.

Pan-democracy camp (27)

People Power (2)
LSD (1)
Neo Democrats (1)
NSWC (1)
Labour (4)
Civic (6)
Prof Commons (2)
Democratic (6)
ADPL (1)
Independent (4)

Pro-Beijing camp (42)

Liberal (5)
New Forum (1)
BPA (7)
NPP (2)
DAB (13)
FTU (6)
FLU (1)
Independent (7)

== Leadership ==
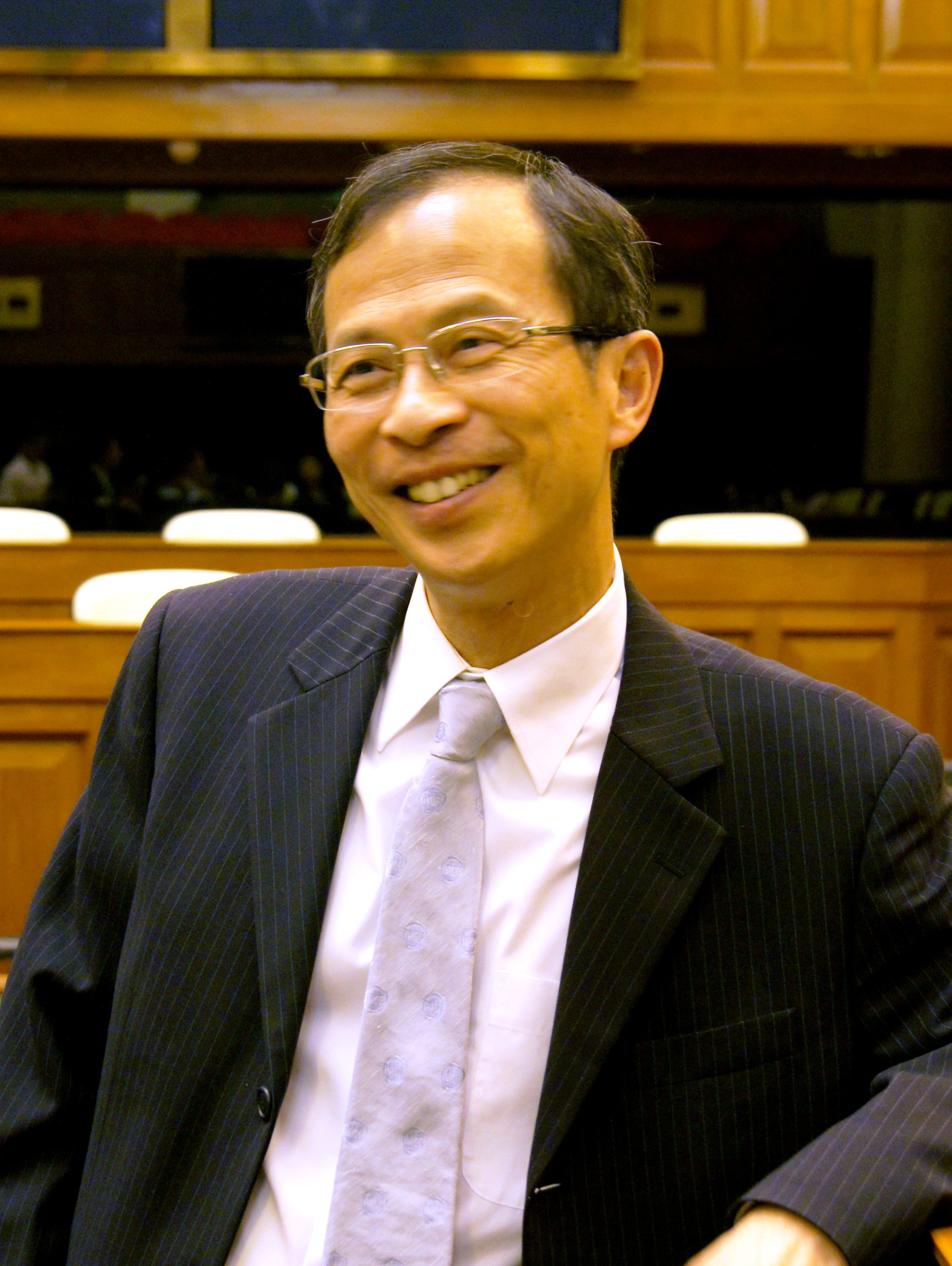
President Jasper Tsang

- President: Jasper Tsang (DAB)

=== Convenors ===
- Pro-Beijing camp: Ip Kwok-him (DAB)
- Pro-democracy camp:
  - Emily Lau (Democratic), 2012–2013
  - Frederick Fung (ADPL), 2013–2014
  - Alan Leong (Civic), 2014–2015
  - Cyd Ho (Labour), 2015–2016

== List of members ==
The following table is a list of LegCo members elected on 9 September 2012 in the order of precedence.

Members who did not serve throughout the term are italicised. Supplementary members elected in by-elections are listed below.

Key to changes since legislative election:

^{a} = change in party allegiance

^{b} = by-election

Capacity	Constituency	Portrait	Elected Members	Elected Party	Political Alignment	Born	Occupation(s)	Assumed Office
President of the Legislative Council
GC	Hong Kong Island		Jasper Tsang	DAB	Pro-Beijing	14 May 1947	Legislative Councillor	1998
Other members
FC	District Council (Second)		Albert Ho	Democratic	Pan-democracy	1 December 1951	Solicitor and Notary Public; Legislative Councillor	1998
GC	New Territories West		Lee Cheuk-yan	Labour/CTU	Pan-democracy	12 February 1957	Legislative Councillor	1998
FC	District Council (Second)		James To	Democratic	Pan-democracy	11 March 1963	Solicitor	1998
GC	Kowloon East		Chan Kam-lam	DAB	Pro-Beijing	22 January 1949	Legislative Councillor	1998
GC	New Territories West		Leung Yiu-chung	NWSC	Pan-democracy	19 May 1953	Legislative Councillor	1998
FC	Heung Yee Kuk		Lau Wong-fat	Economic Synergy^{a}	Pro-Beijing	15 October 1936	Company Chairman	1998
GC	New Territories East		Emily Lau	Democratic	Pan-democracy	22 January 1952	Legislative Councillor	1998
GC	New Territories West		Tam Yiu-chung	DAB	Pro-Beijing	15 December 1949	Legislative Councillor	1998
FC	Real Estate and Construction		Abraham Shek	Professional Forum^{a}	Pro-Beijing	24 June 1945	Company Director	2000
FC	Catering		Tommy Cheung	Liberal	Pro-Beijing	30 September 1949	Merchant; Legislative Councillor	2000
FC	District Council (Second)		Frederick Fung	ADPL	Pan-democracy	17 March 1953	Legislative Councillor	2000
FC	Wholesale and Retail		Vincent Fang	Liberal	Pro-Beijing	7 May 1943	Chief Executive; Managing Director	2004
GC	Hong Kong Island		Wong Kwok-hing	FTU	Pro-Beijing	29 March 1949	Writer; FTU Director	2004
FC	Health Services		Joseph Lee	Independent	Pan-democracy	14 August 1959	Dean and Professor	2004
FC	Commercial (First)		Jeffrey Lam	Economic Synergy^{a}	Pro-Beijing	23 October 1951	Merchant	2004
FC	Industrial (First)		Andrew Leung	Economic Synergy^{a}	Pro-Beijing	24 February 1951	Merchant	2004
FC	Import and Export		Wong Ting-kwong	DAB	Pro-Beijing	12 September 1949	Merchant	2004
GC	New Territories East^{b}		Ronny Tong	Civic^{a}	Pan-democracy	28 August 1950	Senior Counsel	2004
GC	Hong Kong Island		Cyd Ho	Labour/Civic Act-up	Pan-democracy	24 July 1954	Legislative Councillor	2008
FC	District Council (Second)		Starry Lee	DAB	Pro-Beijing	13 March 1974	Accountant; Legislative Councillor	2008
FC	Industrial (Second)		Lam Tai-fai	Independent	Pro-Beijing	22 November 1959	Legislative Councillor	2008
GC	New Territories East		Chan Hak-kan	DAB	Pro-Beijing	24 April 1976	Legislative Councillor	2008
FC	Insurance		Chan Kin-por	Independent	Pro-Beijing	10 May 1954	Legislative Councillor; Chief Executive	2008
GC	Kowloon West		Priscilla Leung	Professional Forum (KWND)^{a}	Pro-Beijing	18 November 1961	Associate Professor; Barrister-at-law	2008
FC	Medical		Leung Ka-lau	Independent	Non-aligned	1962	Doctor	2008
FC	Social Welfare		Cheung Kwok-che	Labour/SWGU	Pan-democracy	8 November 1951	Social Worker	2008
GC	Kowloon East		Wong Kwok-kin	FTU	Pro-Beijing	3 May 1952	Legislative Councillor	2008
FC	District Council (First)		Ip Kwok-him	DAB	Pro-Beijing	8 November 1951	Legislative Councillor	2008
GC	Hong Kong Island		Regina Ip	NPP	Pro-Beijing	24 August 1950	Chair of Savantas Policy Institute	2008
GC	Kowloon East		Paul Tse	Independent	Pro-Beijing	21 November 1959	Solicitor	2008
GC	Kowloon East		Alan Leong	Civic	Pan-democracy	22 February 1958	Senior Counsel	2010 (b)
GC	New Territories East		Leung Kwok-hung	LSD	Pan-democracy	18 January 1957	Legislative Councillor	2010 (b)
GC	New Territories West		Albert Chan	People Power	Pan-democracy	3 March 1955	Legislative Councillor	2010 (b)
GC	Kowloon West		Wong Yuk-man	People Power^{a}	Pan-democracy	1 October 1951	Legislative Councillor	2010 (b)
GC	Kowloon West		Claudia Mo	Civic	Pan-democracy	27 March 1956	Media Freelancer; Part-time Lecturer	2012
GC	New Territories West		Michael Tien	NPP	Pro-Beijing	26 August 1950	Company Chairman	2012
GC	New Territories East		James Tien	Liberal	Pro-Beijing	8 January 1947	Company Chairman	2012
FC	Finance		Ng Leung-sing	Independent	Pro-Beijing	11 July 1949	Banker	2012
FC	Agriculture and Fisheries		Steven Ho	DAB	Pro-Beijing	30 November 1979	Legislative Councillor	2012
FC	Transport		Frankie Yick	Liberal	Pro-Beijing	1953	Company Director	2012
GC	Kowloon East		Wu Chi-wai	Democratic	Pan-democracy	18 October 1962	Legislative Councillor; District Councillor	2012
FC	Tourism		Yiu Si-wing	Independent	Pro-Beijing	1955	Deputy chair of China Travel Service	2012
GC	New Territories East		Gary Fan	Neo Democrats	Pan-democracy	30 October 1966	Legislative Councillor; District Councillor	2012
FC	Sports, Performing Arts, Culture and Publication		Ma Fung-kwok	New Forum	Pro-Beijing	22 July 1955	Managing Director	2012
FC	Information Technology		Charles Peter Mok	Prof Commons	Pan-democracy	25 October 1964	Information Technology Executive	2012
GC	New Territories East		Chan Chi-chuen	People Power/Frontier	Pan-democracy	16 April 1972	Legislative Councillor	2012
GC	New Territories West		Chan Han-pan	DAB/NTAS	Pro-Beijing	1975	Legislative Councillor; District Councillor	2012
GC	Hong Kong Island		Kenneth Chan	Civic	Pan-democracy	12 June 1968	Associate Professor	2012
FC	District Council (Second)		Chan Yuen-han	FTU	Pro-Beijing	15 November 1946	Labour Service	2012
GC	New Territories West		Leung Che-cheung	DAB	Pro-Beijing	3 February 1957	Legislative Councillor; District Councillor	2012
FC	Accountancy		Kenneth Leung	Prof Commons	Pan-democracy	17 October 1962	Tax Consultant; Accountant	2012
GC	New Territories West		Alice Mak	FTU	Pro-Beijing	1 November 1971	Legislative Councillor; District Councillor	2012
GC	New Territories West		Kwok Ka-ki	Civic	Pan-democracy	20 July 1961	Urologist	2012
FC	Labour		Kwok Wai-keung	FTU	Pro-Beijing	15 April 1978	Legislative Councillor	2012
FC	Legal		Dennis Kwok	Civic (Prof Commons)	Pan-democracy	15 April 1978	Barrister-at-law	2012
FC	Financial Services		Christopher Cheung	Independent^{a}	Pro-Beijing	2 May 1952	Securities Dealer	2012
GC	New Territories East		Fernando Cheung	Labour	Pan-democracy	23 February 1957	Lecturer	2012
GC	Hong Kong Island		Sin Chung-kai	Democratic	Pan-democracy	15 June 1960	Legislative Councillor	2012
GC	Kowloon West		Helena Wong	Democratic	Pan-democracy	21 March 1959	Lecturer	2012
FC	Education		Ip Kin-yuen	Independent (PTU)	Pan-democracy	1961	Legislative Councillor; Teacher	2012
GC	New Territories East		Elizabeth Quat	DAB	Pro-Beijing	23 December 1966	Legislative Councillor; District Councillor	2012
FC	Commercial (Second)		Martin Liao	Independent	Pro-Beijing	1957	Barrister-at-law	2012
FC	Labour		Poon Siu-ping	FLU	Pro-Beijing	1957	Barrister-at-law	2012
FC	Labour		Tang Ka-piu	FTU	Pro-Beijing	29 October 1979	Social Worker	2012
GC	Kowloon West		Chiang Lai-wan	DAB	Pro-Beijing	16 May 1955	Legislative Councillor	2012
FC	Engineering		Lo Wai-kwok	Independent^{a}	Pro-Beijing	25 December 1953	Engineer	2012
FC	Textiles and Garment		Chung Kwok-pan	Liberal	Pro-Beijing	4 November 1963	Merchant	2012
GC	Hong Kong Island		Christopher Chung	DAB	Pro-Beijing	31 March 1957	Legislative Councillor	2012
FC	Architectural, Surveying and Planning		Tony Tse	Independent	Pro-Beijing	27 October 1954	Surveyor	2012
Supplementary members
GC	New Territories East		Alvin Yeung	Civic Party	Pro-democracy	5 June 1981	Barrister	2016 (b)

== By-election ==
- 28 February 2016, Alvin Yeung elected and replaced Ronny Tong who resigned on 1 October 2015.

== Other changes ==
=== 2012 ===
- Andrew Leung (Industrial), Jeffrey Lam (Commercial), Lau Wong-fat (Heung Yee Kuk), Abraham Razack (Real Estate and Construction), Priscilla Leung (Kowloon West), Lo Wai-kwok (Engineering) and Christopher Cheung (Financial Services) – members from the Economic Synergy, Professional Forum, and few independents formed a loose new pro-business group the Business and Professionals Alliance for Hong Kong (香港經濟民生聯盟) on 7 October 2012.

=== 2013 ===
- Wong Yuk-man (Kowloon West) announced he was quitting People Power with immediate effect on 20 May 2013.

=== 2015 ===
- Ronny Tong (New Territories East) announced he was quitting the Civic Party on 22 June 2015 and would resign from the Legislative Council.

== Committees ==
- Finance Committee— Chair: Tommy Cheung (2012–13, 2014–15), Ng Leung-sing (2013–14), Chan Kin-por (2015–16)
  - Establishment Subcommittee— Chair: Wong Ting-kwong (2012–13), Regina Ip (2013–14, 2015–16), Kenneth Leung (2014–15)
  - Public Works Subcommittee— Chair: Chan Kam-lam (2012–13), Lo Wai-kwok (2013–14, 2015–16), Alan Leong (2014–15)
- Public Accounts Committee— Chair: Abraham Shek
- Committee on Members' Interests— Chair: Ip Kwok-him
- House Committee— Chair: Andrew Leung
  - Parliamentary Liaison Subcommittee— Chair: Emily Lau
- Committee on Rules of Procedure— Chair: Tam Yiu-chung

=== Panels ===
- Panel on Administration of Justice and Legal Services— Chair: Priscilla Leung (2012–15), Andrew Liao (2015–16)
- Panel on Commerce and Industry— Chair: Vincent Fang, (2012–14), Wong Ting-kwong (2014–16)
- Panel on Constitutional Affairs— Chair: Tam Yiu-chung
- Panel on Development— Chair: Lau Wong-fat (2012–14), Tony Tse (2014–16)
- Panel on Economic Development— Chair: Jeffrey Lam (2012–13, 2014–15), James Tien (2013–14, 2015–16)
- Panel on Education— Chair: Lam Tai-fai
- Panel on Environmental Affairs— Chair: Cyd Ho (2012–14), Chan Hak-kan (2014–16)
- Panel on Financial Affairs— Chair: Starry Lee (2012–14), Chan Kin-por (2014–15), Ng Leung-sing (2015–16)
- Panel on Food Safety and Environmental Hygiene— Chair: Alan Leong (2012–13), Helena Wong (2013–14), Tommy Cheung (2014–16)
- Panel on Health Services— Chair: Leung Ka-lau (2012–14), Joseph Lee (2014–16)
- Panel on Home Affairs— Chair: Ma Fung-kwok (2012–14), Starry Lee (2014–16)
- Panel on Housing— Chair: Wong Kwok-hing (2012–14), Alice Mak (2014–15), Christopher Chung (2015–16)
- Panel on Information Technology and Broadcasting— Chair: Wong Yuk-man (2012–14), Elizabeth Quat (2014–16)
- Panel on Manpower— Chair: Lee Cheuk-yan (2012–14), Wong Kwok-kin (2014–15), Kwok Wai-keung (2015–16)
- Panel on Public Service— Chair: Regina Ip (2012–14), Poon Siu-ping (2014–16)
- Panel on Security— Chair: Ip Kwok-him
- Panel on Transport— Chair: Chan Kam-lam (2012–14), Michael Tien (2014–16)
- Panel on Welfare Services— Chair: Chan Yuen-han (2012–14), Cheung Kwok-che (2014–16)

== See also ==
- 2012 Hong Kong legislative election
