= 4th Legislative Council of Hong Kong =

2008–2012 Legislative Council of Hong Kong

←	3rd Legislative Council	5th Legislative Council	→
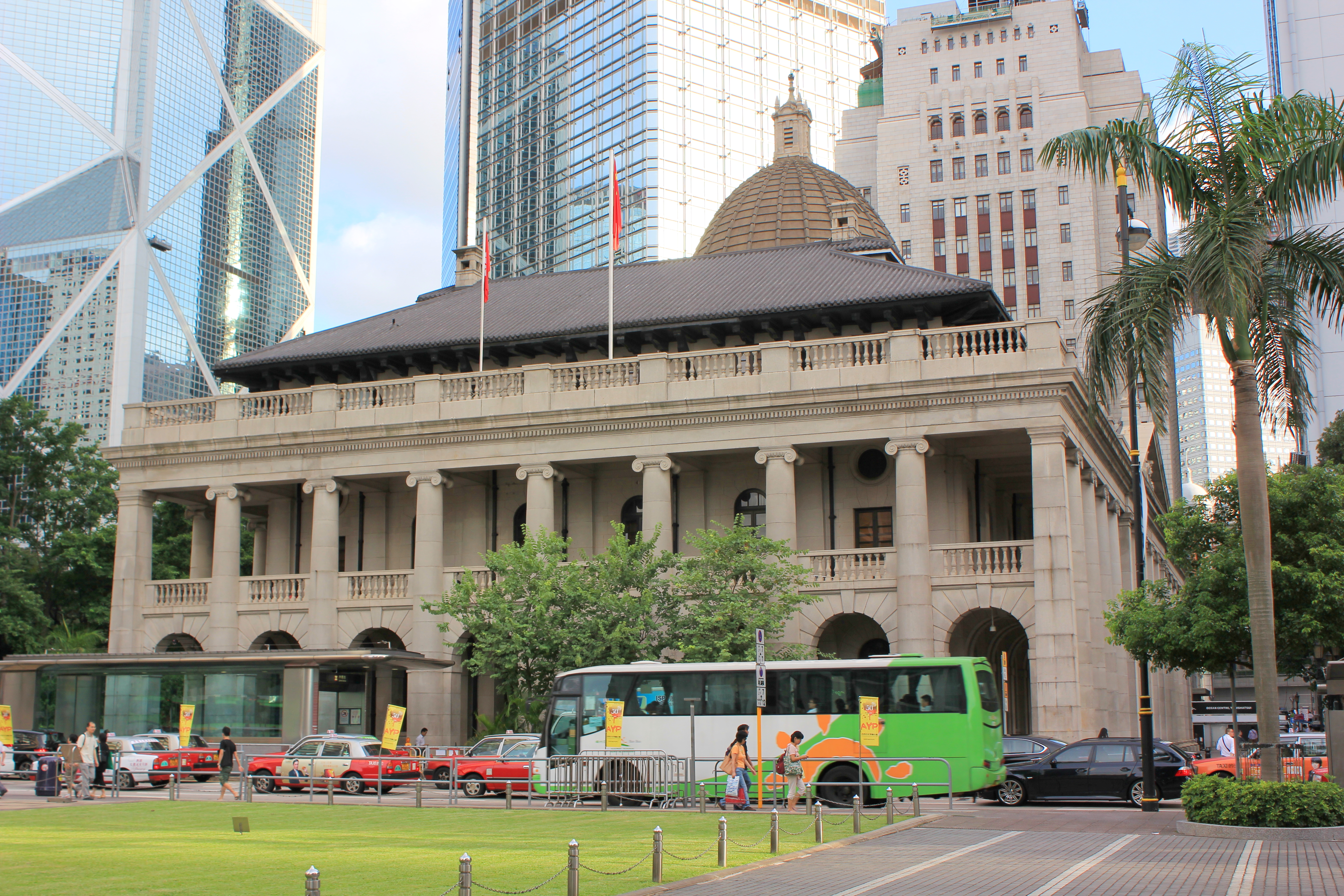

Overview
- Legislative body: Legislative Council
- Jurisdiction: Hong Kong
- Meeting place: Legislative Council Building (2008–11); Legislative Council Complex (2011–12)
- Term: 1 October 2008 – 30 September 2012
- Website: legco.gov.hk/
- Members: 60 members
- President: Tsang Yok-sing (DAB)
- Party control: Pro-Beijing camp

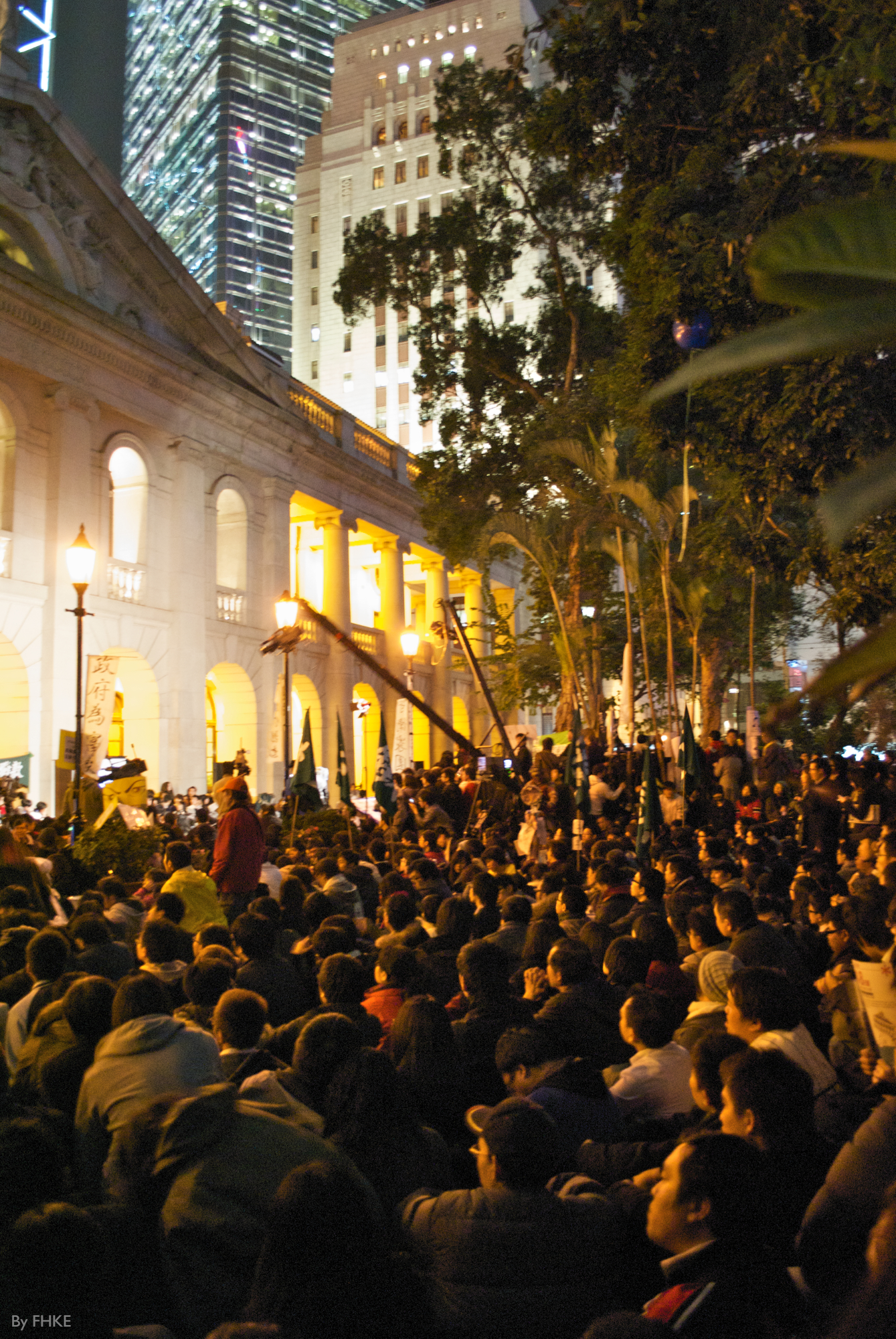
Protestors gathered outside the Legislative Council Building opposing to the Guangzhou–Shenzhen–Hong Kong Express Rail Link in January 2010.

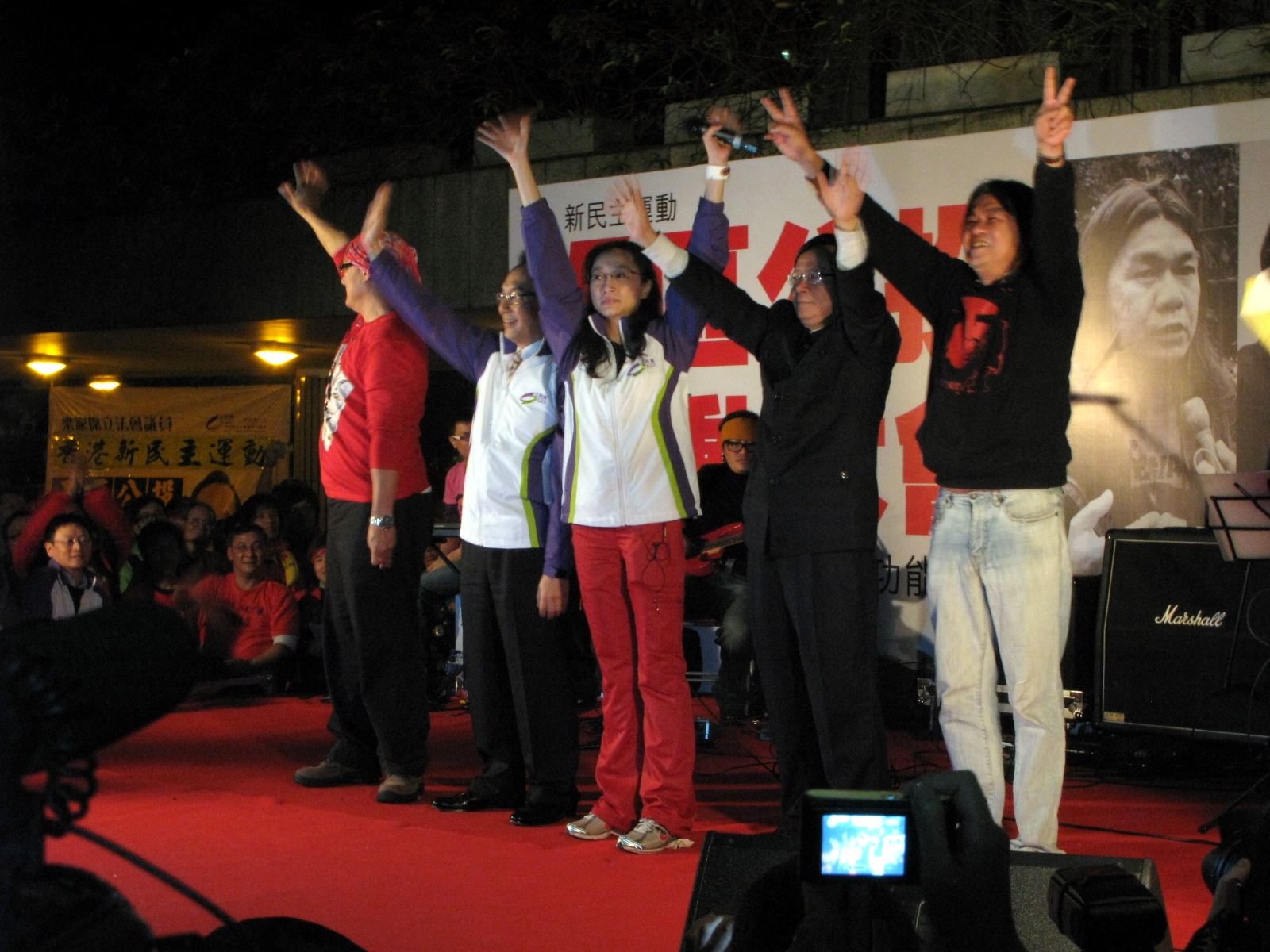
Five resigning democrat legislators at a rally on 27 January 2010.

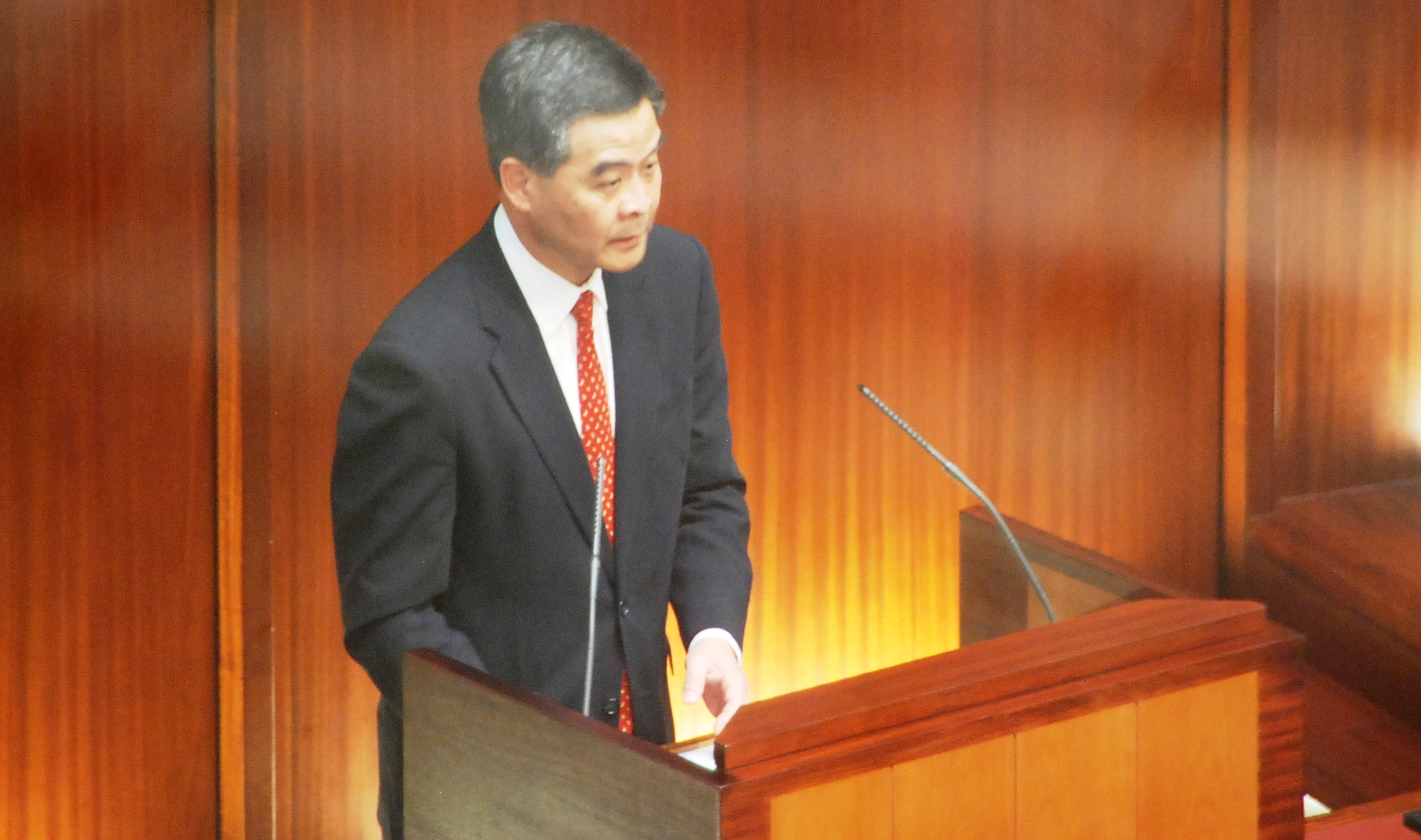
Leung Chun-ying attended Legislative Council Q&A session first time as Chief Executive on 16 July 2012.

The Fourth Legislative Council of Hong Kong was the fourth meeting of the legislative branch of the Hong Kong Special Administrative Region Government. The membership of the LegCo is based on the 2008 election. The term of the session is from 1 October 2008 to 30 September 2012, during the second half of the Donald Tsang's administration and first two months of the Leung Chun-ying's term in office. The meeting place was moved from the Legislative Council Building to the new built Legislative Council Complex in 2011. The Democratic Alliance for the Betterment and Progress of Hong Kong remained the largest party with 10 seats. Notable newcomers to the Legislative Council included Regina Ip, Priscilla Leung, Wong Yuk-man, Tanya Chan, and Paul Tse.

== Major events ==
- 8 October 2008: The DAB member Jasper Tsang Yok-sing who was widely assumed to b a member of the Chinese Communist Party, something he would neither confirm nor deny, was elected President of the Legislative Council.
- 15 October 2008: Annual policy address of the Chief Executive Donald Tsang. During the address, the League of Social Democrats legislator Wong Yuk-man hurled a banana in the direction of Donald Tsang. The three LSD members were ejected from the chamber for the act.
- 18 December 2009 – 16 January 2010: Pro-democracy legislators filibustered against the financing for the constructions of the Guangzhou–Shenzhen–Hong Kong Express Rail Link by raising many questions on very specific issues, delaying the passing of the bill from 18 December 2009 to 16 January 2010. On the evenings the meetings were held, the Legislative Council Building was surrounded by thousands of anti-high-speed rail protesters.
- 26 January 2010 – 16 May 2010: The legislators from the Civic Party (Alan Leong and Tanya Chan) and League of Social Democrats (Wong Yuk-man, Albert Chan and Leung Kwok-hung) resigned and launched a direct by-election for all five constituencies in which they called a de facto referendum on 16 May 2010.
- 23—25 June 2010: The revised 2012 electoral reform package was passed with absolute majority supported by the Democratic Party in the LegCo after hours of hot debates. The resolution for the chief executive in 2012 from 800 to 1,200 members, won endorsement at 2.20 pm on 24 June by the legislature by 46 votes to 13. Pan-democrats who supported the proposals included eight from the Democratic Party, Joseph Lee Kok-long and Frederick Fung of the ADPL. James To, who had earlier expressed misgivings about giving his support, voted in favour. The 'Amendment to method for forming the Hong Kong Legislative Council' was approved by LegCo at 13:30 on 25 June, with 46 votes in favour and 12 against. 'Longhair' Leung Kwok-hung was ejected from the chamber just prior to the vote. Thousands of protestors from both for and against the proposal gathered outside of the LegCo building.
- 2—17 May 2012: Albert Chan and Wong Yuk-man of People Power submitted 1306 amendments altogether to the Legislative Council (Amendment) Bill 2012, by which the government attempted to forbid resigning lawmakers from participating in by-elections. Leung Kwok-hung of the League of Social Democrats and Andrew Cheng also participated in the filibustering. Miriam Lau of the Liberal Party carried out a 30-hour hunger strike to voice her opposition against such act of obstructionism and waste of public coffers. The legislative council carried on multiple overnight debates on the amendments with the support of the pro-Establishment camp. On morning of 17 May 2012, Jasper Tsang, President of the Legco adopt Article 92 of the Standing Order, which allows the president follow foreign parliament rules for unregulated behaviours to terminate the debate. In the end, all amendments were defeated and the Bill was passed.

== Major legislation ==
=== Enacted ===
- 16 December 2009: Domestic Violence (Amendment) Bill 2009
- 17 July 2010: Minimum Wage Bill
- 3 March 2011: Chief Executive Election (Amendment) Bill 2010
- 5 March 2011: Legislative Council (Amendment) Bill 2010
- 1 June 2012: Legislative Council (Amendment) Bill 2012

=== Proposed ===
- Copyright (Amendment) Bill 2011

=== Chief Executive Election and Legislative Council (Amendment) Bill 2010 ===
Following the reform plan passed in June, the LegCo passed the Chief Executive (Amendment) Bill on 3 March 2011 and Legislative Council (Amendment) Bill on 5 March with the Democratic Party voted for the bill. The membership of the Election Committee to return the Chief Executive increased from 800 to 1,200, while the number of seats in the LegCo rose by 10 to 70. Five of the new seats, known as 'super lawmakers', would be in the district councils functional constituency, where 3.2 million people would be eligible to vote.

=== Legislative Council (Amendment) Bill 2012 ===
The 2010 by-election launched by the pro-democracy legislators was strongly criticised by the Beijing government. The government tried to plug the "loophole" by passing the vacancies on to runners-up in the previous election, which was strongly opposed by the legal experts as unconstitutional The pro-democracy camp was strongly opposed to the bill, as it was seen as depriving citizens of their political rights. At last, the government modified the bill to bar the resigning legislator from running again for six months. People Power legislators started the filibuster against it but the bill was passed after President Tsang Yok-sing halted the debate.

== Composition ==
Affiliation	Election	At dissolution
Democratic Alliance for the Betterment and Progress of Hong Kong	10	10
Hong Kong Federation of Trade Unions	4	4
Alliance/Professional Forum	3	4
Economic Synergy	0	4
Liberal Party	7	3
Federation of Hong Kong and Kowloon Labour Unions	1	1
New People's Party	0	1
Independent	12	9
Total for pro-Beijing camp	37	36
Democratic Party	8	8
Civic Party	5	5
Labour Party	0	3
People Power	0	2
League of Social Democrats	3	1
Neighbourhood and Worker's Service Centre	1	1
Hong Kong Association for Democracy and People's Livelihood	1	1
Hong Kong Confederation of Trade Unions	1	0
Frontier	1	0
Civic Act-up	1	0
Hong Kong Social Workers' General Union	1	0
Independent	1	2
Total for pan-democracy camp	23	23
Total	60	59
Vacant	0	1

Note: Italic represents organisations that still function but become under another affiliation.

== Graphical representation of the Legislative Council ==

Pan-democracy camp (23)

LSD (1)
People Power (2)
NSWC (1)
Labour Party (3)
Civic Party (5)
Democratic Party (8)
ADPL (1)
Independents (2)

Pro-Beijing camp (37)

Liberal Party (3)
Economic Synergy (4)
Professional Forum (4)
New People's Party (1)
DAB (10)
FTU (4)
FLU (1)
Independents (10)

== Leadership ==
Office	Party	Officer	Constituency	Since
President	DAB	Jasper Tsang Yok-sing	Hong Kong Island	2008

== List of members ==
The following table is a list of LegCo members elected on 7 September 2008 in the order of precedence.

Members who did not serve throughout the term are italicised. New members elected since the general election are noted at the bottom of the page.

Key to changes since legislative election:

^{a} = change in party allegiance
^{b} = by-election
^{c} = other change

GC/ FC	Constituency	Portrait	Elected Members	Elected Party	Political Alignment	Born	Occupation(s)	Assumed Office
GC	Hong Kong Island		Jasper Tsang	DAB	Pro-Beijing	14 May 1947	Legislative Councillor	1998
GC	New Territories West		Albert Ho	Democratic	Pan-democracy	1 December 1951	Solicitor and Notary Public; Legislative Councillor	1998
FC	Engineering		Raymond Ho	Alliance	Pro-Beijing	23 March 1939	Engineer	1998
GC	New Territories West		Lee Cheuk-yan	CTU^{a}	Pan-democracy	12 February 1957	Legislative Councillor	1998
FC	Finance		David Li	Independent	Pro-Beijing	13 March 1939	Banker	1998
GC	Kowloon East		Fred Li	Democratic	Pan-democracy	25 April 1955	Legislative Councillor	1998
FC	Legal		Margaret Ng	Civic	Pan-democracy	25 January 1948	Barrister-at-law	1998
GC	Kowloon West		James To	Democratic	Pan-democracy	11 March 1963	Solicitor	1998
FC	Education		Cheung Man-kwong	Democratic/PTU	Pan-democracy	15 September 1954	Teacher; Legislative Councillor	1998
GC	Kowloon East		Chan Kam-lam	DAB	Pro-Beijing	22 January 1949	Legislative Councillor	1998
FC	Textiles and Garment		Sophie Leung	Liberal^{a}	Pro-Beijing	9 October 1945	Company Director	1998
GC	New Territories West		Leung Yiu-chung	NWSC	Pan-democracy	19 May 1953	Legislative Councillor	1998
FC	Commercial (Second)		Philip Wong	Independent	Pro-Beijing	23 December 1938	Company Chairman	1998
FC	Agriculture and Fisheries		Wong Yung-kan	DAB	Pro-Beijing	10 August 1951	Legislative Councillor	1998
GC	New Territories East		Lau Kong-wah	DAB	Pro-Beijing	22 June 1957	Legislative Councillor	1998
FC	Heung Yee Kuk		Lau Wong-fat	Liberal^{a}	Pro-Beijing	15 October 1936	Company Chairman	1998
FC	Transport		Miriam Lau	Liberal	Pro-Beijing	27 April 1947	Solicitor and Notary Public	1998
GC	New Territories East		Emily Lau	Frontier^{a}	Pan-democracy	22 January 1952	Legislative Councillor	1998
GC	New Territories East		Andrew Cheng	Democratic^{a}	Pan-democracy	28 April 1960	Solicitor	1998
FC	Sports, Performing Arts, Culture and Publication		Timothy Fok	Independent	Pro-Beijing	14 February 1946	Merchant	1998
GC	New Territories West		Tam Yiu-chung	DAB	Pro-Beijing	15 December 1949	Legislative Councillor	1998
FC	Real Estate and Construction		Abraham Shek	Alliance	Pro-Beijing	24 June 1945	Company Director	2000
FC	Labour		Li Fung-ying	FLU	Pro-Beijing	2 December 1950	Trade Union Officer	2000
FC	Catering		Tommy Cheung	Liberal	Pro-Beijing	30 September 1949	Merchant; Legislative Councillor	2000
GC	New Territories West^{b}		Albert Chan	LSD^{a}	Pan-democracy	3 March 1955	Legislative Councillor	2000
GC	Kowloon West		Frederick Fung	ADPL	Pan-democracy	17 March 1953	Legislative Councillor	2000
GC	Hong Kong Island		Audrey Eu	Civic	Pan-democracy	11 September 1953	Senior Counsel	2000 (b)
FC	Wholesale and Retail		Vincent Fang	Liberal	Pro-Beijing	7 May 1943	Chief Executive; Managing Director	2004
GC	New Territories West		Wong Kwok-hing	FTU	Pro-Beijing	29 March 1949	FTU Director	2004
GC	New Territories West		Lee Wing-tat	Democratic	Pan-democracy	25 December 1955	District Councillor	2004
FC	Health Services		Joseph Lee	Independent	Pan-democracy	14 August 1959	Dean and Professor	2004
FC	Commercial (First)		Jeffrey Lam	Liberal^{a}	Pro-Beijing	23 October 1951	Merchant	2004
FC	Industrial (First)		Andrew Leung	Liberal^{a}	Pro-Beijing	24 February 1951	Merchant	2004
GC	Kowloon East^{b}		Alan Leong	Civic	Pan-democracy	22 February 1958	Senior Counsel	2004
GC	New Territories East^{b}		Leung Kwok-hung	LSD	Pan-democracy	18 January 1957	Legislative Councillor	2004
GC	New Territories West		Cheung Hok-ming	DAB	Pro-Beijing	3 July 1952	Legislative Councillor	2004
FC	Import and Export		Wong Ting-kwong	DAB	Pro-Beijing	12 September 1949	Merchant	2004
GC	New Territories East		Ronny Tong	Civic	Pan-democracy	28 August 1950	Senior Counsel	2004
FC	Financial Services		Chim Pui-chung	Independent	Pro-Beijing	24 September 1946	Company Director	2004
FC	Architectural, Surveying and Planning		Patrick Lau	Alliance	Pro-Beijing	1 June 1944	Architect; Professor	2004
GC	Hong Kong Island		Kam Nai-wai	Democratic	Pan-democracy	1 November 1960	Social Worker	2008
GC	Hong Kong Island		Cyd Ho	Civic Act-up^{a}	Pan-democracy	24 July 1954	Politician	2008
GC	Kowloon West		Starry Lee	DAB	Pro-Beijing	13 March 1974	Accountant	2008
FC	Industrial (Second)		Lam Tai-fai	Independent	Pro-Beijing	22 November 1959	Merchant	2008
GC	New Territories East		Chan Hak-kan	DAB	Pro-Beijing	24 April 1976	Researcher	2008
FC	Accountancy		Paul Chan^{c}	Independent	Pro-Beijing	18 March 1955	Accountant	2008
FC	Insurance		Chan Kin-por	Independent	Pro-Beijing	10 May 1954	Advisor	2008
GC	Hong Kong Island^{b}		Tanya Chan	Civic	Pan-democracy	14 September 1971	Barrister-at-law	2008
GC	Kowloon West		Priscilla Leung	Independent^{a}	Pro-Beijing	18 November 1961	Associate Professor; Barrister-at-law	2008
FC	Medical		Leung Ka-lau	Independent	Non-aligned	1962	Doctor	2008
FC	Social Welfare		Cheung Kwok-che	SWGU/ADPL^{a}	Pan-democracy	8 November 1951	Social Worker	2008
GC	New Territories East		Wong Sing-chi	Democratic	Pan-democracy	11 October 1957	Social Worker	2008
GC	Kowloon East		Wong Kwok-kin	FTU	Pro-Beijing	3 May 1952	FTU Chair	2008
GC	Kowloon West^{b}		Wong Yuk-man	LSD^{a}	Pan-democracy	1 October 1951	Commentator	2008
FC	Labour		Ip Wai-ming	FTU	Pro-Beijing	18 October 1965	Trade Union Worker	2008
FC	District Council		Ip Kwok-him	DAB	Pro-Beijing	8 November 1951	Executive Secretary	2008
GC	Hong Kong Island		Regina Ip	Independent^{a}	Pro-Beijing	24 August 1950	Chair of Savantas Policy Institute	2008
FC	Labour		Pan Pey-chyou	FTU	Pro-Beijing	9 November 1955	Psychiatrist	2008
FC	Tourism		Paul Tse	Independent	Pro-Beijing	21 November 1959	Solicitor	2008
FC	Information Technology		Samson Tam	Independent	Pro-Beijing	26 February 1964	Company Director	2008

== By-election ==
- 16 May 2010, Albert Chan, Leung Kwok-hung, and Wong Yuk-man from the League of Social Democrats and Alan Leong and Tanya Chan from the Civic Party re-elected to the LegCo after their resignation to call for a de facto referendum on universal suffrage.

== Other changes ==
=== 2008 ===
- Lau Wong-fat (Heung Yee Kuk), Jeffrey Lam (Commercial), Andrew Leung (Industrial) and Sophie Leung (Textiles and Garment) – Liberal Party members withdrawn on 8 October 2008, and later on founded a new group called Economic Synergy in 2009.
- Priscilla Leung (Kowloon West) – joined the Professional Forum which was formed on 8 October 2008 by the members of the Alliance.
- Emily Lau (New Territories East) – Convenor of the Frontier became a member of the Democratic Party when the groups merged on 23 November 2008.

=== 2010 ===
- Andrew Cheng (New Territories East) – withdrawn from the Democratic Party to oppose the Party's decision of backing the controversial electoral reform proposals on 23 June 2010.

=== 2011 ===
- Regina Ip (Hong Kong Island) – formed the New People's Party and became the chairman on 9 January 2011.
- Wong Yuk-man (Kowloon West) and Albert Chan (New Territories West) – former chairman and one of the figureheads of the League of Social Democrats (LSD) left the Party on 23 January 2011 in disarray which left the LSD only one seat in the LegCo. On the same day, Wong and Chan formed a new group called People Power with the former supporters of the LSD.
- Lee Cheuk-yan (New Territories West), Cyd Ho (Hong Kong Island) and Cheung Kwok-che (Social Welfare) – respectively represented the Confederation of Trade Unions, Civic Act-up, and Social Worker's General Union, founded the Labour Party on 18 December 2011.

=== 2012 ===
- Paul Chan (Accountancy) – resigned on 27 July 2012 to take up principal official post as the Secretary for Development. No by-election was held to fill his vacant seat as there was a pending general election.

== Committees ==
- Finance Committee— Chair: Emily Lau
  - Establishment Subcommittee— Chair: Wong Yung-kan (2008—10), Margaret Ng (2010—12)
  - Public Works Subcommittee— Chair: Raymond Ho
- Public Accounts Committee— Chair: Philip Wong
- Committee on Members' Interests— Chair: Sophie Leung
- House Committee— Chair: Miriam Lau
  - Parliamentary Liaison Subcommittee— Chair: Abraham Razack
- Committee on Rules of Procedure— Chair: Tam Yiu-chung

=== Panels ===
- Panel on Administration of Justice and Legal Services— Chair: Margaret Ng
- Panel on Commerce and Industry— Chair: Vincent Fang Kang (2008—10), Wong Ting-kwong (2010—12)
- Panel on Constitutional Affairs— Chair: Tam Yiu-chung
- Panel on Development— Chair: Lau Wong-fat (2008—10), Patrick Lau (2010—12)
- Panel on Economic Development— Chair: Jeffrey Lam
- Panel on Education— Chair: Cyd Ho (2008—10), Starry Lee (2010—12)
- Panel on Environmental Affairs— Chair: Audrey Eu (2008—10), Gary Chan (2010—12)
- Panel on Financial Affairs— Chair: Chan Kam-lam
- Panel on Food Safety and Environmental Hygiene— Chair: Fred Li (2008—10), Tommy Cheung (2010—12)
- Panel on Health Services— Chair: Joseph Lee (2008—10), Leung Ka-lau (2010—12)
- Panel on Home Affairs— Chair: Ip Kwok-him
- Panel on Housing— Chair: Wong Kwok-hing (2008—10), Lee Wing-tat (2010—12)
- Panel on Information Technology and Broadcasting— Chair: Andrew Leung (2008—09), Samson Tam (2008—10), Wong Yuk-man (2010—12)
- Panel on Manpower— Chair: Li Fung-ying (2008—10), Lee Cheuk-yan (2010—12)
- Panel on Public Service— Chair: Lee Cheuk-yan (2008—10), Regina Ip (2010—12)
- Panel on Security— Chair: Lau Kong-wah (2008—10), James To (2010—12)
- Panel on Transport— Chair: Cheung Hok-ming (2008—10), Andrew Cheng (2010—12)
- Panel on Welfare Services— Chair: Albert Chan (2008—09), Wong Sing-chi (2009—10), Cheung Kwok-che (2010—12)

== See also ==
- 2008 Hong Kong legislative election
- 2010 Hong Kong by-election
