= Death of Le Van Muoi =

Vietnamese refugee

- Born: March 1966; North Vietnam
- Died: 9 October 2020 (aged 54); Tuen Mun Hospital, Hong Kong
- Other name: Ah Sap

Le Van Muoi (Chinese: 黎民十; March 1966 – 9 October 2020), also known as "Ah Sap" (Cantonese: 阿十), was a Vietnamese homeless man in Hong Kong and a former Vietnamese refugee. Before his death, he lived in Tung Chau Street Park in Sham Shui Po.

== Early life ==
Ah Sap was born in North Vietnam during the Vietnam War. He was the tenth child in his family, with nine older siblings. His family was a typical poor rural Vietnamese household. In 1987, he came to Hong Kong to escape war and seek a livelihood. He once lived in the Hei Ling Chau Detention Centre. After the refugee camp was closed, Ah Sap and other Vietnamese refugees dispersed, and he later moved to Tung Chau Street Park. According to Pastor Lam Kwok-cheung, who knew Ah Sap well, and Ah Wah, a fellow Vietnamese refugee, Ah Sap was friendly and valued his friendships despite not speaking fluent Cantonese. He also worked part-time as a cleaner to support himself financially.

== Assault and suicide ==
On 4 and 24 February 2020, several homeless people complained that they had been assaulted by plainclothes police officers, including having their hair pulled, being kicked in the groin, and verbally abused. Ah Sap was among the victims. Officers were also accused of smashing homeless people's personal belongings, including chairs and canned food, with hammers. One officer suspected of criminal damage was immediately suspended. On 8 May, police stated that nine arrested officers had been suspended on suspicion of "misconduct in public office" and "perverting the course of justice," and the case was handed to the Commercial Crime Bureau for investigation, though no prosecutions were initiated for an extended period.

After the assault, Shiu Ka-chun invoked the Cap. 486 Personal Data (Privacy) Ordinance to request surveillance footage from the Leisure and Cultural Services Department for those two days. However, the department refused, citing that the case had entered judicial proceedings and that the police strongly opposed disclosure. Shiu criticized the police for obstructing public exposure of the incident and preventing citizens from pursuing private prosecutions.

In October 2020, Ah Sap was arrested on suspicion of drug possession. While being remanded at Siu Lam Psychiatric Centre, he was found with trousers wrapped around his neck. He was sent to hospital and died the following day. During the coroner's inquest in November 2023, forensic pathologist Dr. Ying Ho-wan, who conducted the autopsy, stated that self-strangulation was extremely rare. The jury later unanimously concluded that Ah Sap had died by suicide. CCDI-888/2020(DK)

== Aftermath ==
=== Controversy of the "Heart of Cyberpunk" exhibition ===
The “Heart of Cyberpunk" exhibition (數碼龐克號) opened under the Tung Chau Street flyover in Sham Shui Po in October 2020, organized by the Hong Kong Design Centre (HKDC) and Tourism Commission. Featuring futuristic fashion and city-themed installations by local designers, it drew criticism because the site had previously been cleared of homeless people by the government. Critics accused the exhibition of whitewashing the displacement of vulnerable people and area redevelopment. The organizers denied any connection between the clearance and the exhibition, saying the site had been vacant for over two years and was simply being borrowed for a free, nine-day community event. Sham Shui Po district councilor Jay Lee Ting-fung believed the exhibition itself was a positive initiative. He said the organizers originally wanted to pilot open exhibitions in public spaces. Due to COVID-19, the event was moved from a closed public sports facility to the vacant Tung Chau Street Temporary Market. Lee noted that the homeless people were not evicted by HKDC, and argued that the incident involving “Ah Sap" was unrelated. However, he believed the controversy escalated because Hong Kong citizens no longer trust the government.

=== Aftermath of Ah Sup's death ===
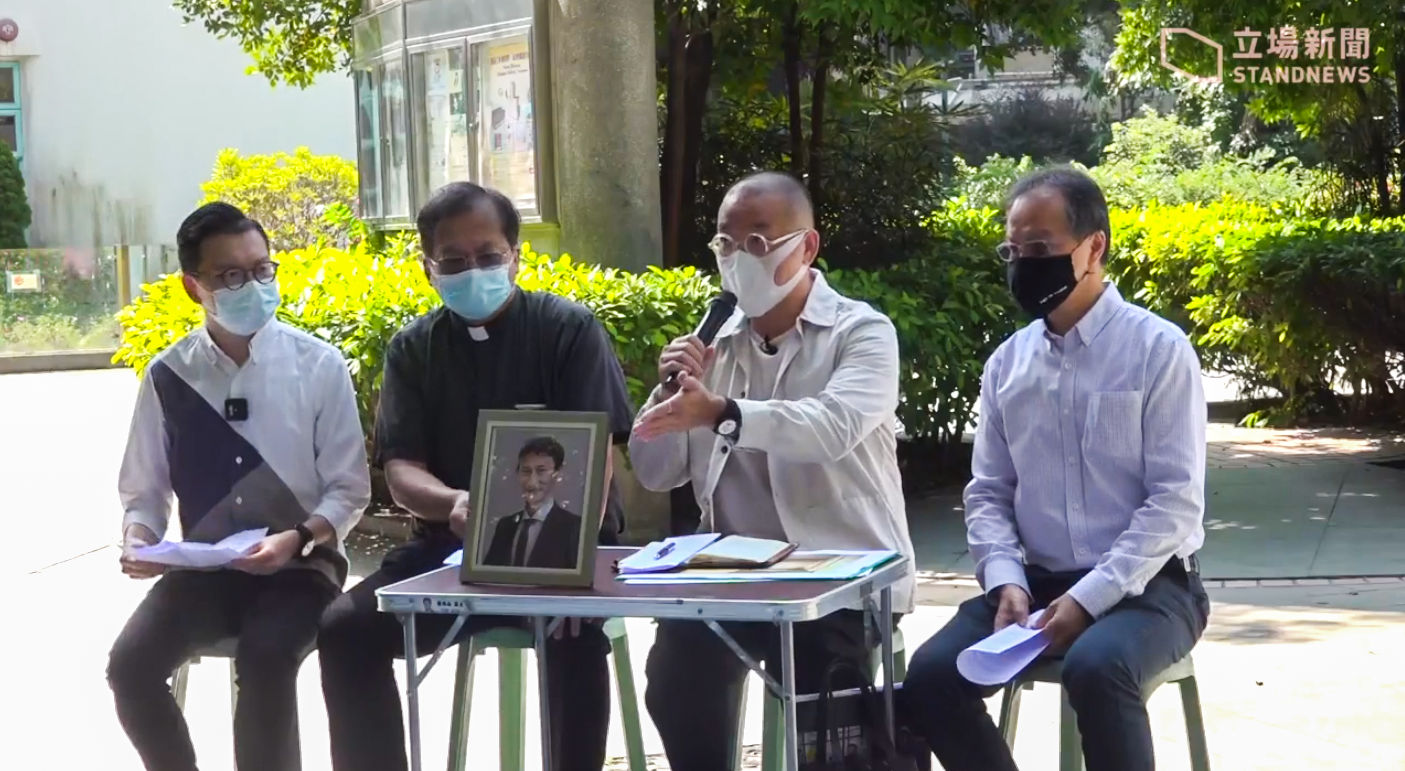
On 21 October 2020, former Legislative Council member Shiu Ka-chun, Pastor Lam Kwok-cheung, and Fernando Cheung, who had previously assisted Ah Sap, held a press conference at the park to announce the arrangements for his funeral and other affairs.

After Ah Sap's death, his family wrote to Pastor Lam Kwok-cheung requesting that he handle the funeral arrangements on their behalf. Regarding the unusual request for a witness statement during the body identification process, Lam said that he had worked with homeless people for more than eight years and had helped identify nearly twenty bodies, but had never encountered such a demand before. Lam also stated that police officers had inserted statements into the written record claiming that Ah Sap had "self-harmed while in custody" and was suffering from financial hardship. Lam later requested that these statements be removed.

Other homeless people who had lived with Ah Sap at Tung Chau Street set up a memorial altar for him. It displayed his portrait and Vietnamese name, along with incense, food offerings, and joss paper offerings. On 20 November 2020, Pastor Lam held a memorial service for Ah Sap at the Kowloon Funeral Parlour. Ah Sap's representative lawyer, Andrew Cheng Kar-foo, also attended.

The 2020 Tung Chau Street police brutality case remained unresolved after Ah Sap's death, leading to public concerns that the investigation had been repeatedly delayed. Shiu Ka-chun said he had continuously requested CCTV footage from the Leisure and Cultural Services Department under the Code on Access to Information, intending to pursue private prosecution against the officers involved, but authorities refused disclosure on the grounds that the case had "entered judicial proceedings."

In September 2022, after COVID-19 restrictions eased and border controls were relaxed, Pastor Lam personally brought Ah Sap's ashes back to his hometown in Vietnam for burial and met with his family. His ashes were subsequently interred there, and a gravestone and ancestral tablet were established.

In October 2024, eight police officers involved in the Tung Chau Street Park anti-drug operation in February 2020 were charged with assaulting homeless people including Ah Sap, fabricating drug possession accusations, and damaging property. Six of them were convicted of perverting the course of justice and sentenced to prison terms ranging from two years to three years and five months. The six convicted officers were Leung Fei-pang, Pong Chun-sze, Lam Wah-ka, Mok Chi-shing, Wan Pak-sze, and Chan Sau-yip. DCCC-123/2021

== See also ==
- Vietnamese boat people
- Vietnamese refugee detention centres in Hong Kong
