= Cloture =

Parliamentary procedure forcing a quick end to a debate

Headline in The Philadelphia Inquirer of 16 November 1919 reporting the first use of cloture by the United States Senate

Cloture (/ˈkloʊtʃər/, also UK: /ˈkloʊtjʊər/), closure, or informally a guillotine, is a motion or process in parliamentary procedure aimed at bringing debate to a quick end. The cloture procedure originated in the French National Assembly, from which the name is taken. Clôture is French for "the act of terminating something".

It was introduced into the Parliament of the United Kingdom by William Ewart Gladstone to overcome the obstructionism of the Irish Parliamentary Party and was made permanent in 1887. It was subsequently adopted by the United States Senate and other legislatures. The name cloture remains in the United States. In Commonwealth countries it is usually closure or, informally, guillotine. In the United Kingdom and Canada, closure and guillotine are distinct motions.

== Australia ==
In Australia, the procedure by which finite debating times for particular bills are set, or protracted debates are brought to a close, is referred to as a "guillotine" or “gag”. Generally, a minister will declare that a bill must be considered as urgent, and move a motion to limit debating time. The declaration and motion may refer to a single bill, or to multiple bills or packages of bills. A guillotine motion may not be debated or amended, and must be put to a vote immediately.

== Canada ==
After a number of occasions where the opposition managed to delay or prevent passage of government bills, closure in Canada was adopted by the House of Commons in 1913 on the motion of Conservative Prime Minister Robert Borden. The new closure rule was used by the government only a few days later, during debate at the Committee of the Whole stage of the Naval Aid Bill. Between 1913 and 1932, closure was invoked 11 times. It was used next time in 1956 during the passage of a bill to establish the Northern Ontario Pipeline Crown Corporation. "Closure" is the term used in Canada; "cloture" and "guillotine" are not used. Closure was used to force the adoption of a single red maple leaf flag design on December 15, 1964.

Procedure on closure in Canada is governed under Standing Order no. 57 of the House of Commons and consists of three parts: Notice of closure, a motion of closure, and a final period of debate before final voting on the bill being closured. Notice of closure is an oral statement announcing intention to call for closure given by any Minister at a prior sitting of the Committee of the Whole. The notice need not be the day immediately prior to the sitting at which the bill will be closured, but cannot be in the same sitting as the final motion of closure. The motion of closure, referred to as a motion "that the debate shall not be further adjourned", is passed by a simple majority of the House of Commons, although in the event of a tie, the Speaker of the House will apply Speaker Denison's rule to issue the casting vote. Should the motion of closure pass, all members are given a single period in which to speak lasting no more than 20 minutes. If the final period of speaking to the bill has not been finished by 8:00 p.m. that same day, no MP may speak after that point, and the bill moves to a final vote.

=== Time allocation ===
A time allocation schedules the stages that a bill goes through. It also for much more specific control over the legislative process than closure, it can control the exact amount of time spent on each step of the legislative process. Time allocation is also known as guillotine.

== Hong Kong ==
The first cloture in Hong Kong was introduced in the Legislative Council of Hong Kong on 17 May 2012, by Tsang Yok-sing (President of the Legislative Council of Hong Kong), to abruptly halt filibuster during debate at the Committee of the Whole stage of the Legislative Council (Amendment) Bill 2012. The motion to end debate was submitted by Council member Philip Wong Yu-hong some time after 4 am Hong Kong time, after a marathon session that lasted over 33 hours. Wong stood up and suggested that legislatures in other countries have a procedure called "cloture motion", and suggested Council President should end debate immediately. President Tsang agreed and said that he considered ending debate even without Wong's suggestion because he would not allow debate to go on endlessly. Cloture is not defined by any rule or precedent of the Legislative Council. Tsang made reference to Standing Order 92, which stated "In any matter not provided for in these Rules of Procedure, the practice and procedure to be followed in the Council shall be such as may be decided by the President who may, if he thinks fit, be guided by the practice and procedure of other legislatures".

Standing Order 92 therefore may implicitly give Council President discretion on whether he should or should not follow the cloture rules of other legislatures, but this is up to debate. Legislative Council President Tsang chose to end debate without calling for a cloture vote, which is questionable. Council member Leung Kwok-hung then stood up and said that he had never heard of cloture without a vote anywhere else and suggested there should have been a cloture vote. Cloture was again invoked by Tsang Yok-sing on 13 May 2013 to halt debate of the 2013 Appropriation Bill.

== New Zealand ==
In the New Zealand House of Representatives, any MP called to speak may move a closure motion. If the length of the debate is not fixed by standing orders or the Business Committee, the Speaker may decide to put the closure motion to a vote, which is carried by a simple majority.

== United Kingdom ==
=== Procedures ===
A closure motion may be adopted to end debate on a matter both in the House of Commons and in the House of Lords by a simple majority of those voting. In the House of Commons, at least 100 MPs (not counting two acting as tellers) must vote in favour of the motion for closure to be adopted; the Speaker of the House of Commons may choose to deny the closure motion if insufficient debate has occurred or if the procedure is being used to violate the rights of the minority. In the House of Lords, the Lord Speaker does not possess an equivalent power. He must read a statement stating the motion should only be used in exceptional circumstances, and then asks the member if they wish to persist with moving it. If they do, then the motion is put immediately without debate. Only one closure motion is permitted per debate.

Specific to legislation, a guillotine motion, formally an allocation of time motion, limits the amount of time for a particular stage of a bill. Debate ceases when the allotted time expires. A single vote is taken immediately to pass the stage of the bill and, in the case of a committee stage or report stage, to accept all undebated sections and government amendments. The use of guillotines has been replaced by the programme motion, where the amount of time for each stage is agreed after a bill's second reading. Both guillotine motions and programme motions are specific to the Commons. The Lords does not permit time restrictions.

=== History ===
On 24 January 1881, the second Gladstone ministry attempted to move the first reading of the Protection of Person and Property Bill, a controversial response to the Irish agrarian disturbances known as the Land War. The Irish Parliamentary Party (IPP) under Charles Stewart Parnell responded with the most extreme example of its policy of obstructionism by filibuster. After two sittings lasting 22 hours and then 41 hours, the Speaker of the Commons, Henry Brand simply refused to recognise any further IPP MPs wishing to speak. In the early hours of 2 February 1881 he put the motion, which was passed. The IPP MPs objected that this was an abuse by the speaker of their rights as members. The government responded by formalising the process as an amendment to the standing orders, moved by Gladstone on 3 February 1881:

That, if upon Notice given a Motion be made by a Minister of the Crown that the state of Public Business is urgent, and if on the call of the Speaker 40 Members shall support it by rising in their places, the Speaker shall forthwith put the Question, no Debate, Amendment, or Adjournment being allowed; and if, on the voices being given he shall without doubt perceive that the Noes have it, his decision shall not be challenged, but, if otherwise, a Division may be forthwith taken, and if the Question be resolved in the affirmative by a majority of not less than three to one, the powers of the House for the Regulation of its Business upon the several stages of Bills, and upon Motions and all other matters, shall be and remain with the Speaker, until the Speaker shall declare that the state of Public Business is no longer urgent, or until the House shall so determine upon a Motion, which after Notice given may be made by any Member, put without Amendment, Adjournment, or Debate, and decided by a majority

Gladstone described it as "a subject of considerable novelty, and of the extremest gravity", and many Irish members objected and were suspended from the House before the amendment motion was moved. In 1882, Gladstone proposed a major overhaul of the rules of procedure. On 20 February debate began on the first resolution, on "putting the question". The session beginning in November 1882 was devoted entirely to the new rules. The motion on putting the question was passed, after 19 days' debate, on 10 November 1882:

That when it shall appear to Mr. Speaker, or to the Chairman of Ways and Means in a Committee of the whole House, during any Debate, that the subject has been adequately discussed, and that it is the evident sense of the House, or of the Committee, that the Question be now put, he may so inform the House or the Committee; and, if a Motion be made "That the Question be now put", Mr. Speaker, or the Chairman, shall forthwith put such Question; and, if the same be decided in the affirmative, the Question under discussion shall be put forthwith: Provided that the Question, "That the Question be now put", shall not be decided in the affirmative, if a Division be taken, unless it shall appear to have been supported by more than two hundred Members, or unless it shall appear to have been opposed by less than forty Members and supported by more than one hundred Members.

The rule was invoked only twice by Gladstone's ministry, and the second Salisbury ministry secured its amendment, after six days' debate, on 1 March 1887:

That, after a Question has been proposed, a Motion may be made, if the consent of the Chair has been previously obtained, "That the Question be now put". Such Motion shall be put forthwith, and decided without Amendment or Debate: When the Motion "That the Question be now put", has been carried, and the Question consequent thereon has been decided, any further Motion may be made (the consent of the Chair having been previously obtained) which, may be requisite to bring to a decision any Question already proposed from the Chair; and also if a Clause be then under consideration, a Motion may be made (with the consent of the Chair as aforesaid) That the Question, That the Clause stand part, or be added to the Bill, be now put. Such Motions shall be put forthwith, and decided without Amendment or Debate: Provided always, That Questions for the Closure of Debate shall not be decided in the affirmative, if a Division be taken, unless it shall appear by the numbers declared from the Chair, that such Motion was supported by more than Two Hundred Members, or was opposed by less than Forty Members, and supported by more than One Hundred Members

By 1909, the closure was applicable in committees and to motions as well as in the house and to bills. In 2000, almost a century later, the Select Committee on the Modernisation of the House of Commons recommended discontinuing the use of allocation of time motions for bills, and instead passing a programme motion to make a programme order. This was accepted by the Commons on 7 November 2000. One of the Cameron–Clegg coalition's most significant parliamentary defeats was in 2012, on the programme motion for the House of Lords Reform Bill 2012. Some rebel MPs agreed with the substance of the bill but felt not enough time had been allocated to its debate.

== United States ==
=== History ===
On 8 March 1917, during World War I, a rule allowing cloture of debate was adopted by the Senate by a vote of 76–3 at the urging of President Woodrow Wilson, after a group of 12 anti-war senators managed to kill a bill that would have allowed Wilson to arm merchant vessels in the face of unrestricted German submarine warfare. This effort was led by Republican Senators Henry Cabot Lodge and Charles Curtis. This was successfully invoked for the first time on 15 November 1919, during the 66th Congress, to end a filibuster on the Treaty of Versailles.

The Senate's rules originally required a supermajority of two-thirds of all senators present and voting to invoke cloture. For example, if all 100 senators voted on a cloture motion, 67 affirmative votes were required to invoke cloture. If some senators were absent and only 80 senators voted, only 54 would have to vote in favor. In the early years of the cloture rule, it proved very difficult to achieve this. The Senate tried 11 times between 1927 and 1962 to invoke cloture, but failed each time. Filibuster use was particularly heavy by Democratic senators from southern states to block civil rights legislation.

In 1975, the Democratic Senate majority, having achieved a net gain of four seats in the 1974 Senate elections to attain a strength of 61 (with an additional independent senator caucusing with them for a total of 62), reduced the necessary supermajority to three-fifths of senators duly chosen and sworn. In practice, most bills cannot become law without the support of 60 senators. Under the Senate rules and precedents, certain questions are nondebatable or debate time on them is limited, most notably bills considered under the reconciliation procedure or joint resolutions providing for congressional disapproval. Therefore, these measures cannot be filibustered and are not subjected to the supermajority cloture threshold. Although filing cloture on nondebatable measures is redundant, it has been done on occasion.

On November 21, 2013, after many of President Barack Obama's nominees had been filibustered (most notably, Republicans refused to confirm any nominees to the United States Court of Appeals for the District of Columbia Circuit), Majority Leader Harry Reid raised a point of order that the threshold for invoking cloture on nominations, other than those to the Supreme Court of the United States, is a simple majority. The presiding officer overruled the point of order. The ruling of the chair was overruled by the Senate by a vote of 48–52, with all Republicans, as well as Democratic Senators Carl Levin, Joe Manchin and Mark Pryor, voting in favor of sustaining the decision of the chair.

On April 6, 2017, following the filibuster of Neil Gorsuch's nomination to the Supreme Court of the United States, Majority Leader Mitch McConnell raised a point of order that the 2013 precedent also applied to Supreme Court nominations. The presiding officer overruled the point of order. The ruling of the chair was overturned by the Senate by a vote of 48–52, with all Democrats voting to sustain the decision of the chair. As a result of these two precedents, the threshold for invoking cloture on nominations is now a simple majority. In the United States House of Representatives, the equivalent motion is the previous question.

=== Procedure ===
The procedure for invoking cloture is as follows:

- A minimum of 16 senators must sign a cloture motion that states, "We, the undersigned Senators, in accordance with the provisions of Rule XXII of the Standing Rules of the Senate, do hereby move to bring to a close debate on [the measure]."
- Any senator (generally the majority leader) may present the cloture motion at any time (including while another senator is speaking) while the question to which the cloture motion is directed is pending.
- The Senate then often moves on to other business.
- One hour after the Senate convenes on the second calendar day of session following the filing of the cloture motion (or at a time designated by unanimous consent), the cloture motion ripens, and the presiding officer directs the clerk to report the cloture motion.
- The presiding officer directs the clerk to call the roll to ascertain the presence of a quorum. In practice, this mandatory quorum call is almost always waived by unanimous consent.
- The presiding officer puts to the Senate the question, "Is it the sense of the Senate that debate shall be brought to a close?"
- The Senate votes on the cloture motion by the yeas and nays. A majority of three-fifths of senators duly chosen and sworn (60 votes if there is no more than one vacancy in the Senate) is required for most questions. A two-thirds majority of senators present and voting is required to invoke cloture on a motion or resolution to amend the Standing Rules of the Senate. Under the precedents set by the Senate on November 21, 2013, and April 6, 2017, a simple majority of senators present and voting is required to invoke cloture on nominations.

After cloture is invoked, the Senate automatically proceeds to consider the measure on which cloture was invoked (if it was not before the Senate already). The following restrictions apply:

- The clotured measure remains the unfinished business to the exclusion of all other business until disposed of.
- No senator may speak for more than one hour. A senator may yield part or all of their one hour to a floor manager or leader, who may in turn yield that time to other senators. No manager nor leader may have more than two hours yielded to them by another senator.
- The two-speech rule does not apply.
- Senators may yield back part or all of their one hour. This yielding does not reduce the total time available for consideration of the measure.
- No senator may propose more than two amendments until every senator has had the opportunity to do the same.
- No amendment may be proposed unless it had been submitted in writing to the journal clerk by 1 o'clock p.m. on the day following the filing of the cloture motion in the case of a first-degree amendment or one hour prior to the beginning of the cloture vote in the case of a second-degree amendment.
- All amendments must be germane.
- Senators may continue to offer amendments even if their time for debate has expired.
- No dilatory motions or quorum calls are in order.
- After 30 hours of debate on the measure, the presiding officer puts the question on any pending amendments and the clotured measure. Under the precedent set on April 3, 2019, post-cloture time on all nominations, other than those to the Supreme Court of the United States, those to the United States courts of appeals and those to a position at Level I of the Executive Schedule, is two hours.
- Once post-cloture time has expired, the only motions in order are motions to reconsider and motions to table. One quorum call may also be demanded by a senator. Any senator who has not used nor yielded back ten minutes is guaranteed such time to speak to the measure.

Under rule XXII, paragraph 3, added in January 2013, a cloture motion signed by 16 senators (including the majority leader, minority leader, 7 other majority senators and 7 other minority senators) presented on a motion to proceed ripens one hour after the Senate convenes on the following calendar day. If cloture is invoked, the motion to proceed is not debatable. Under rule XXVIII, paragraph 2, added in January 2013, a cloture motion on a compound motion to go to conference ripens two hours after it is filed. If cloture is invoked, the compound motion is not debatable.

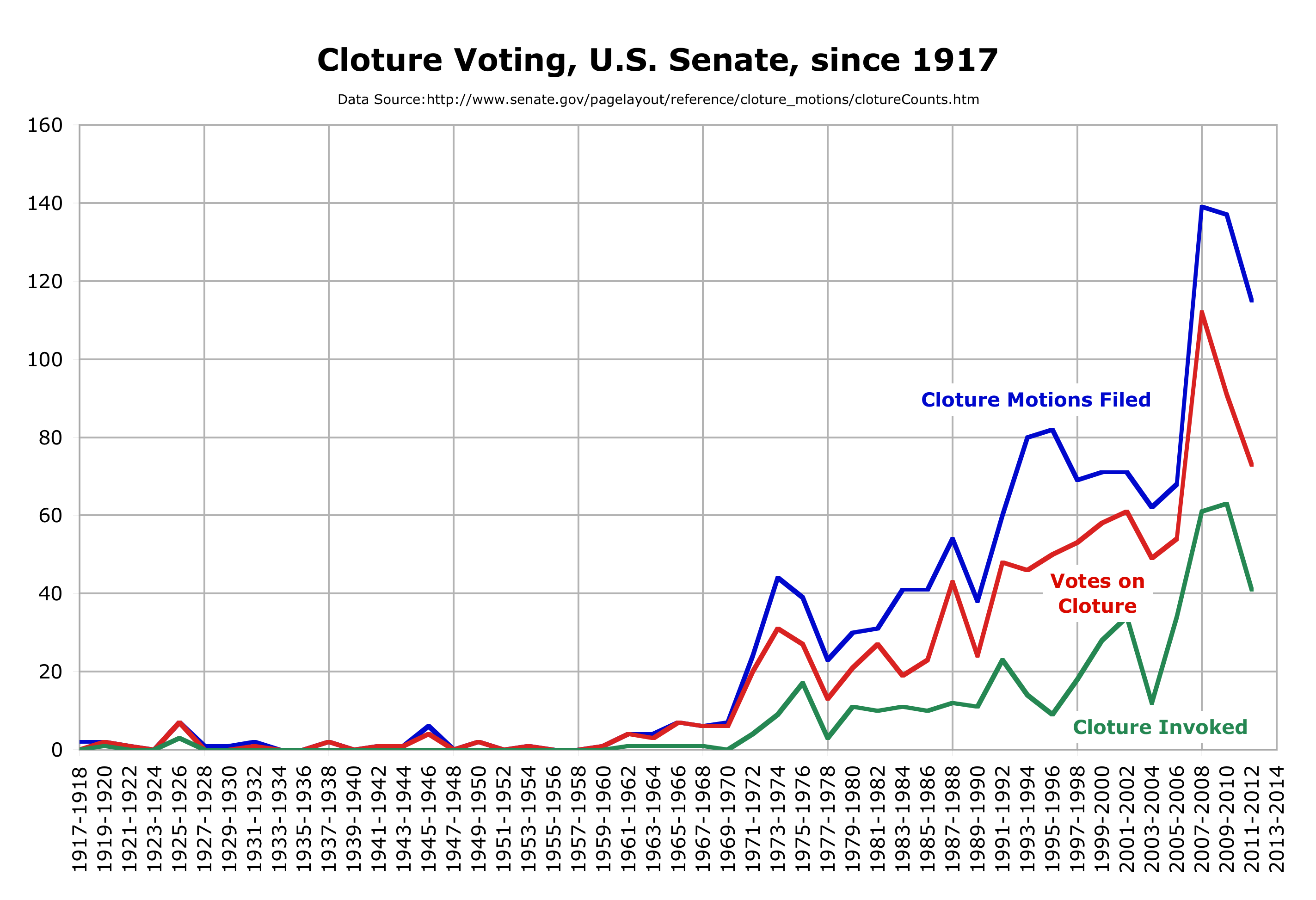
Cloture voting in the United States Senate, 1917−2014

== See also ==
- Filibuster in the United States Senate
  - "Nuclear option"
- Gang of 14
- Justice delayed is justice denied
- Kangaroo closure
- Previous question
