= Wall-fare =

- 石牆花
- Formation: 14 December 2020
- Founder: Shiu Ka-chun
- Dissolved: 14 September 2021
- Type: Nonprofit organization
- Purpose: Prisoners' rights activism
- Staff: 8 staff (2021)
- Website: https://wallfarehk.com/

Wall-fare (Chinese: 石牆花) was a major prisoners' rights advocacy group in Hong Kong. It was formed by former pro-democracy legislator Shiu Ka-chun to provide support for jailed activists and promote the well-being of them, by raising funds to provide daily necessities and providing emotional support through a coordinated a letter-writing scheme.

Following attacks from the pro-Beijing camp and government ministers for "endangering national security", the organization disbanded in September 2021, ending its nine-month history.

== Early history ==
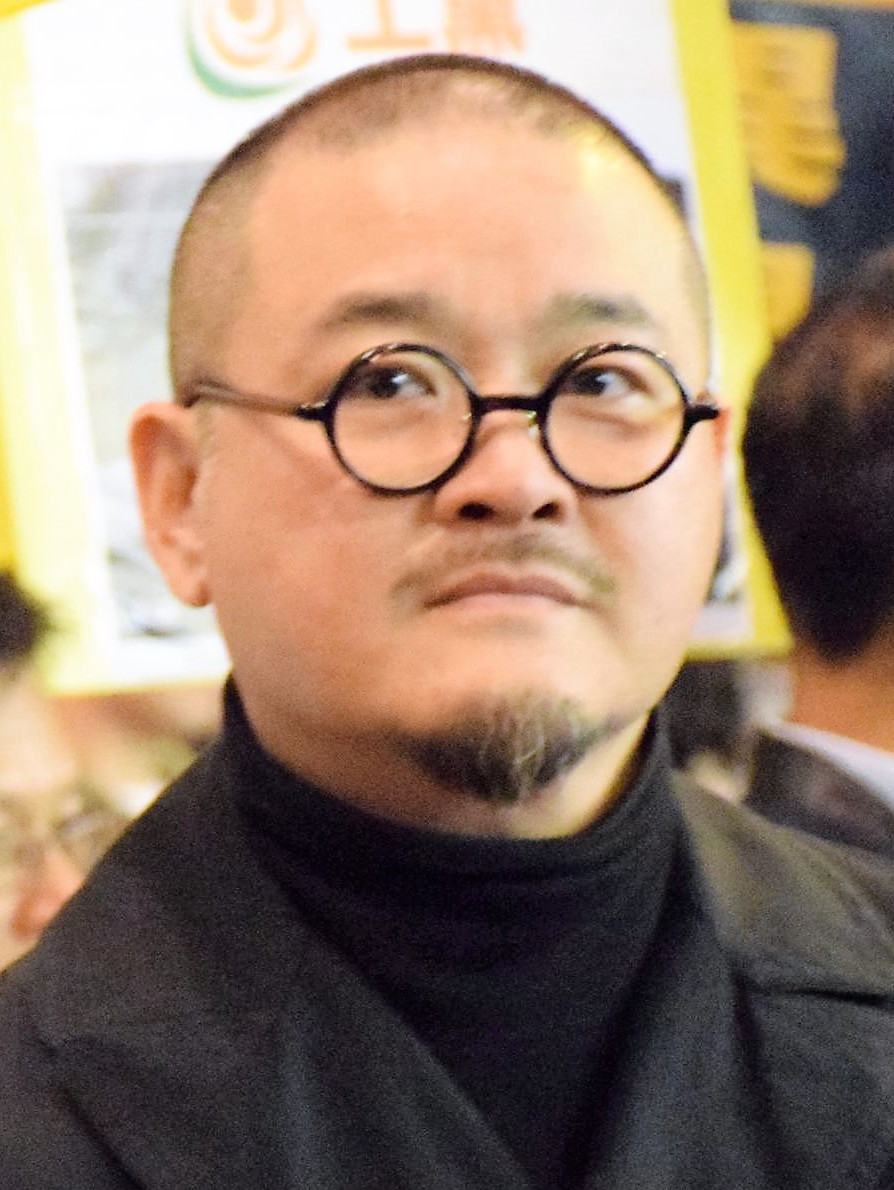
Shiu in 2017

Shiu Ka-chun, a social worker who was elected as a member of Legislative Council in 2016, was sentenced to 8 months in prison for his involvement in the Umbrella Movement and was released in October 2019. At that time, hundreds of protesters and activists were arrested during the massive 2019 pro-democracy protests. Taking the view that prisoners' rights were not respected by the Correctional Services Department (CSD) from his own experiences, Shiu started to advocate for reforming the governance of prisons and treatment of inmates, while supporting the detained and their families.

As Hong Kong prisons saw an influx of detainees following the protests and unrest, Shiu founded the forerunning platform of Wall-fare in mid-2020, trying to raise awareness in society. Shiu planned to employ released prisoners and operate as a social enterprise.

Despite facing multiple challenges such as low donations and a long wait for setting up a bank account, Wall-fare came into operation in December 2020 after the bank account opened. The office was located just a few blocks from the Lai Chi Kok Reception Centre, which Shiu said was the deciding factor to open the office in Lai Chi Kok as it serves conveniently for the inmates' families. Apart from storing prisoners' necessities that are designated by the CSD, the office had meeting areas and a library with books for the protesters in jail.

== Advocacy and work ==
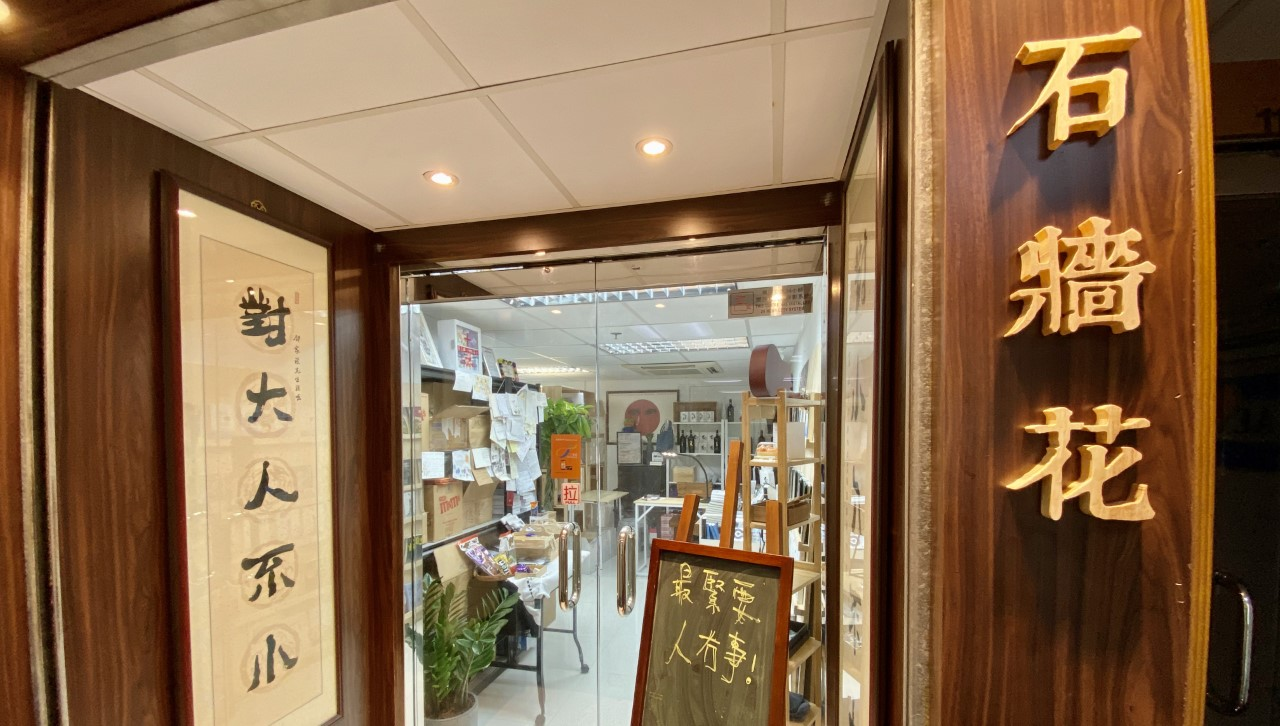
Lai Chi Kok office of Wall-fare

Relatives of the detained protesters could register with Wall-fare and collect prison service-designated necessities for free. The group coordinated the public to write letters and holiday cards to the imprisoned as a way of emotional support. Throughout 2020 Wall-fare said they handled more than 6,000 letters. On Valentine's Day, Shiu's group delivered a dozen of flowers to inmates to "break prison walls with love". Besides, Wall-fare followed up individual cases and assisted in welfare application for arrestees. The group is also known for its advocacy in improving treatments of inmates and reforming the penal services.

In February 2021, prominent democracy activists, later known as Hong Kong 47, were detained for subversion. They were brought to court for a four-day marathon trial for bail application which Shiu described as a "humanitarian crisis". Wall-fare sourced for commodities for them.

During a record heatwave in the summer of 2021, Wall-fare launched a petition for prisons to implement better cooling measures for detainees, gaining over 100,000 signatories within 33 hours. CSD replied Shiu a few days later that the authorities had taken measures to improve the condition. The former opposition lawmaker acknowledged penal service's willingness to deliver plans for the detainees, but also hoped they will listen to the public's suggestions which are feasible and can be materalised quickly.

As another protester-supporting group, Good Neighbour North District Church (好鄰舍北區教會), was accused of money laundering by crowd-funding and the bank account was frozen, Wall-fare stopped receiving public donations, and instead relied on selling "Justice Coffee" with a free price for income. The group said that they were in financial difficulties, having needed to help more than a hundred of inmates every month.

== Criticism ==
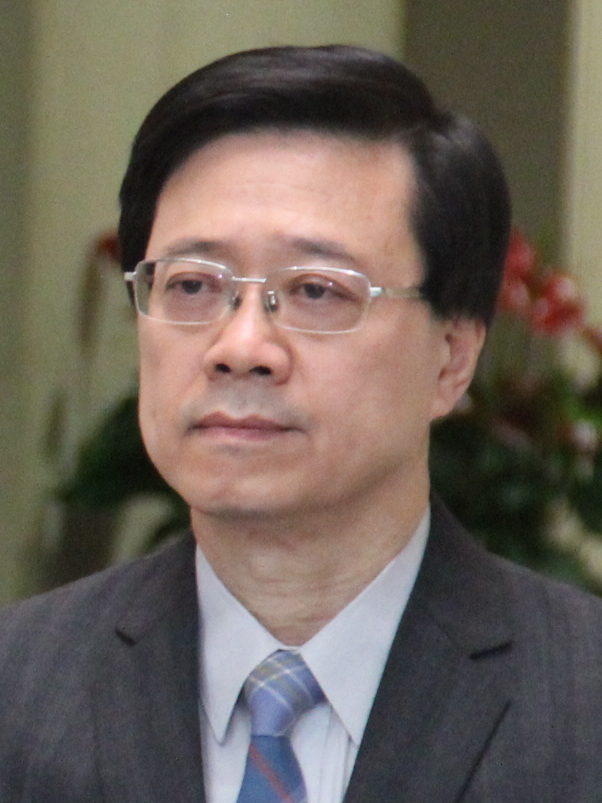
John Lee

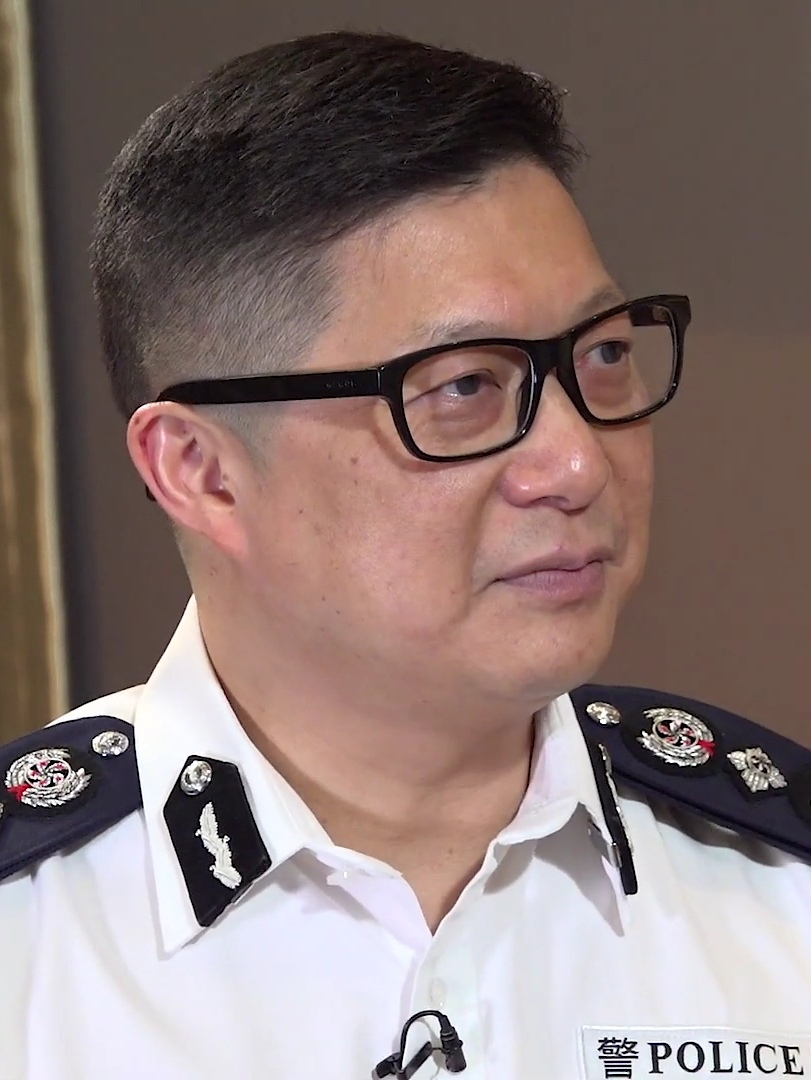
Chris Tang

Criticisms from two successive security ministers forced the closure of Wall-fare

Wall-fare wrote on social media in March 2021 that meals in Stanley Prison were poorly prepared. The group alleged the CSD of attempting to force inmates to receive prison diet instead of food procured by themselves. John Lee, then Secretary for Security, rebuked Wall-fare for their absurd attack and their attempt to block prison officers from carrying out their duties.

Pro-government group Defend Hong Kong Campaign claimed in June 2021 that they had received more than 180,000 signatures that denounced Wall-fare "attacking" the CSD by making absurd complaints and defaming the penal service with accusations of humiliating and torturing prisoners. Voicing support to the penal service to counter the pressures from Wall-fare, the government supporters said Shiu and his affiliates attempted to wage an "anti-government" campaign through unlimited resources to the imprisoned. Meanwhile, Danny Woo, the Commissioner of Correctional Services, criticised Wall-fare without naming them for slandering the penal service and trying to create a privileged environment for some prisoners in the name of prisoners' rights.

Security minister Chris Tang claimed in September 2021 that some inmates attempted to endanger national security through scheming with others outside of prison. It came a week after a protest by female detainees in Lo Wu Correctional Institution, reportedly including pro-democracy activist Tiffany Yuen, was quashed. Anti-riot officers found them in possession of chocolates and hair clips that exceeded the numbers allowed by quotas. Apart from groups that "monopolised" the supply of daily necessities, Tang said 612 Humanitarian Relief Fund "sowed seeds that threaten national security" through supporting detainees.

Many people may wonder what the problem is with having one more hair clip, one more piece of chocolate. These signify privilege within prison walls… By smuggling these things inside… [to] recruit followers and build influence, and create hatred towards the government and endanger national security.

Shiu said chocolates and hair clips found at the Lo Wu facility are authorised to receive them without smuggling. He added Tang's comments were "incomprehensible" and reaffirmed that Wall-fare donated items to detainees free of charge and had no incentive to control their supply. However Shiu said Wall-fare would make fewer online calls for donating necessities, which could inadvertently lead to misunderstandings by the government. Shiu denied abusing the complaint mechanism, saying it was normal to express views and that the group had acknowledged CSD's effort of introducing ice towels to improve detainee's living conditions during heatwave.

== Dissolution ==
Pressure mounted on Wall-fare again after Tang's comments, and a week later on 14 September 2021, Shiu announced disbanding Wall-fare with immediate effect, and halting its scheme to raise funds for prisoner provisions.

Today we announce we are officially closing. Even though we were eventually crushed, the time we have exchanged was also worth it. Sorry. We did our best, and our efforts themselves are Wall-fare’s story.

He said the group had been facing pressure from different sides since the start and had been careful in every step. Shiu accepted that remarks by the minister had placed Wall-fare in a more difficult position, and after an event on 12 September which Wall-fare was unable to disclose, all eight staff agreed unanimously at the same night to end the group. Shiu added no government officials approached them, but said that civil groups could be criminalised purely by existing. It had been in his consideration that safety of the staff should be prioritised. He thanked supporters from all sides which had made operation possible.

A day after the disbandment, Tang said he respected the decision made by their own, but also pointed out that he was only sharing his personal thoughts but not demanding any groups to close down.

Families of detained protesters and activists were hit hard by Wall-fare's shutdown, while numerous small-scale organisations filled up the void left by Wall-fare's closing to maintain support for jailed protesters.
