= Kangaroo closure =

Parliamentary Political Maneuver

Kangaroo closure is a measure coined as early as 1911 reserved for parliamentary procedure wherein the chairman or speaker selects certain amendments for discussion and excludes others. The unselected amendments are each voted on without debate. It was first used in the United Kingdom House of Commons in the battle over the 1909 finance bill. The term is used because the chairman, in essence, "leaps" over certain amendments for discussion.

The practice is now codified in the UK House of Commons by Standing Order No. 32.

== See also ==
- Cloture
