= Hui Yin-fat =

Hong Kong social worker and politician (1936–2016)

Hui Yin-fat OBE, JP
- 許賢發

Member of the Legislative Council
- In office 30 October 1985 – 31 July 1995
- Preceded by: New constituency
- Succeeded by: Law Chi-kwong
- Constituency: Social Services
- In office 21 December 1996 – 30 June 1998 (Provisional Legislative Council)

Director of the Hong Kong Council of Social Service
- In office 1973–2001
- Succeeded by: Christine Fang

Personal details
- Born: 28 April 1936 Guangzhou, China
- Died: 7 December 2016 (aged 80)
- Education: La Salle College; King's College; University of Hong Kong (BA Hons, Dip); Western Reserve University (MSc)
- Occupation: Social worker

Hui Yin-fat, OBE, JP (Chinese: 許賢發; 28 April 1936 – 7 December 2016) was a Hong Kong social worker and politician. He was a long-time director of the Hong Kong Council of Social Service and was elected member of the Legislative Council of Hong Kong for Social Services, member of the Executive Council in 1991 and member of the Provisional Legislative Council.

== Biography ==
Hui was born in Guangzhou, China in 1936 and was educated at the La Salle College and King's College before he was enrolled into the University of Hong Kong. He joined the Hong Kong Council of Social Service, an umbrella group of social work organisations, in 1967 after he obtained a master's degree from the Western Reserve University and was the director of the council from 1973 to 2001.

He was one of the first members to be elected to the Legislative Council of Hong Kong when he stood for the Social Services functional constituency, representing social workers, in the first indirect election in 1985. In 1991, he was briefly appointed by Governor David Wilson to the Executive Council of Hong Kong after the 1991 general election. He stepped down as Executive Councillor when Governor Chris Patten reformed the council in 1992.

He was considered part of the liberal bloc in the legislature and voted for the controversial constitutional reform package put forward by the last colonial governor Chris Patten. He stepped down in 1995 and his seat was succeeded by Law Chi-kwong, member of the Democratic Party.

Despite his political stance, he remained friendly relationship with the Beijing authorities and was appointed Hong Kong Affairs Advisor. He was later elected to the Beijing-installed Provisional Legislative Council in which he served from 1997 to 1998.

Hui suffered a stroke in his later age. He died on 7 December 2016 at the age of 80.

Legislative Council of Hong Kong
New constituency	Member of Legislative Council; Representative for Social Services; 1985–1995	Succeeded by Law Chi-kwong
New parliament	Member of Provisional Legislative Council; 1997–1998	Replaced by Legislative Council
