= Shiu Ka-chun =

Hong Kong social worker and activist (1969–2025)

- 邵家臻
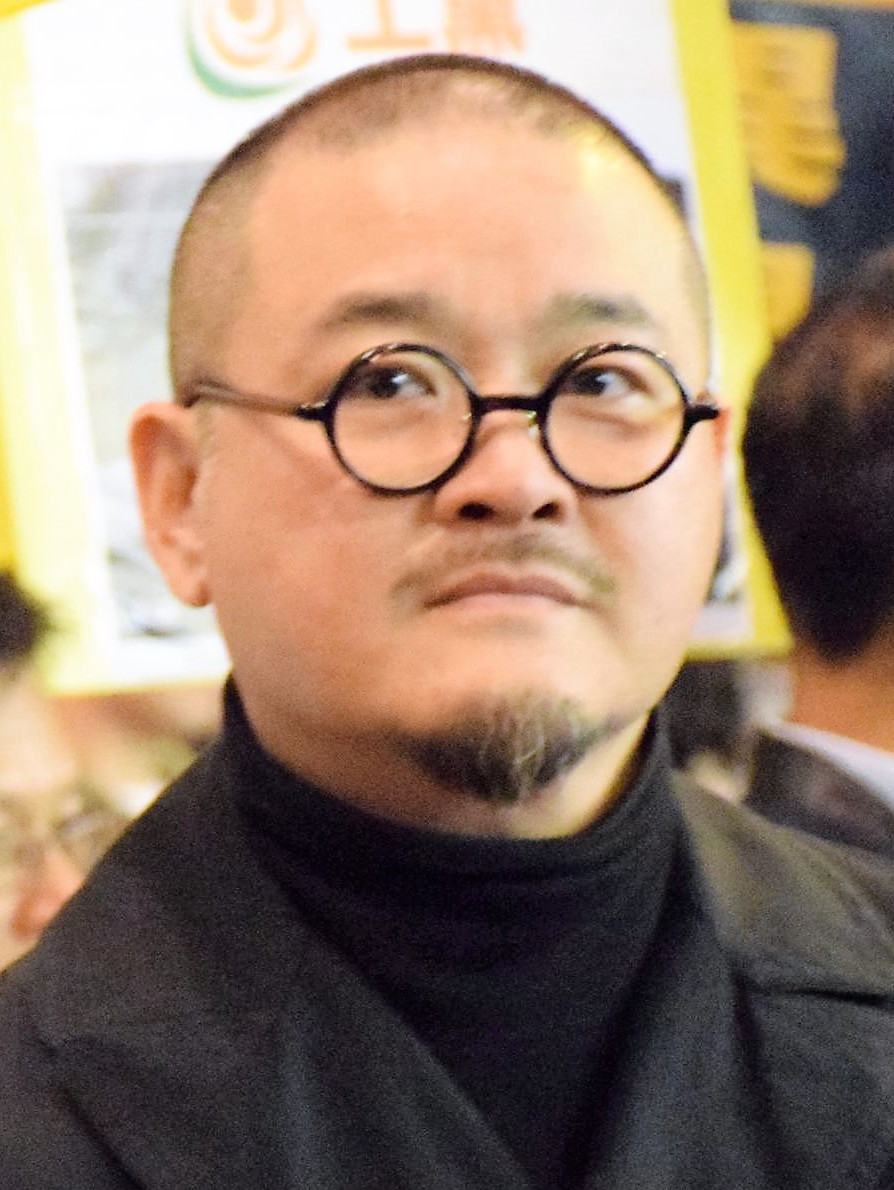
- Shiu in 2017

Member of the Legislative Council
- In office 1 October 2016 – 1 December 2020
- Preceded by: Cheung Kwok-che
- Succeeded by: Tik Chi-yuen (2022)
- Constituency: Social Welfare

Personal details
- Born: 3 June 1969 British Hong Kong
- Died: 10 January 2025 (aged 55) Kowloon, Hong Kong
- Party: Professionals Guild
- Education: Hong Kong Baptist University
- Profession: Social worker
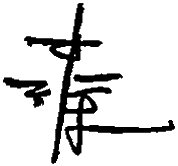
- Signature

Shiu Ka-chun
- Chinese: 邵家臻
Transcriptions
Standard Mandarin
- Hanyu Pinyin: Shào Jiāzhēn
Yue: Cantonese
- Jyutping: siu6 gaa1 zeon1

Shiu Ka-chun (Chinese: 邵家臻; 3 June 1969 – 10 January 2025) was a Hong Kong social worker and activist, and a lecturer at Hong Kong Baptist University. He was one of leaders in the 2014 Hong Kong protests. In 2016, he was elected to the Legislative Council of Hong Kong through the Social Welfare functional constituency. Shiu resigned along with 14 other remaining pro-democracy legislators from the Legislative Council on 11 November 2020, after the central government had unseated four of pro-democracy legislators the same day.

== Early life, activism, and term in Legislative Council ==
Shiu was a social worker and activist, and a onetime lecturer and associate director of the Centre for Youth Research and Practice at Hong Kong Baptist University.

He participated in social movements and some illegal protests, including in the 2014 Hong Kong protests, a 79-day-long protest against the Beijing government's restrictions on the electoral method of choosing the Chief Executive of Hong Kong. He was one of the core members, along with the Occupy Central trio, Benny Tai, Chan Kin-man and Chu Yiu-ming. He voluntarily reported to police after the trio and Cardinal Joseph Zen had done the same, towards the end of the Occupy event in early December 2014.

In 2016, he was elected to the Legislative Council of Hong Kong through the Social Welfare functional constituency.

On 24 April 2019, Shiu was sentenced to eight months in prison after having been convicted, two weeks earlier, of public nuisance charges in relation to the protests in 2014. The following day, Shiu was taken to hospital due to an irregular heartbeat. Having recovered from a successful angioplasty procedure, Shiu was transferred to prison by 7 May; his application for leave of absence to attend Legislative Council meetings was refused by prison authorities. After his release, Shiu was advised by Hong Kong Baptist University in January 2020 to stop teaching pending a disciplinary review, and in late July 2020 that his contract as lecturer would not be renewed beyond August. Pointing to his excellent evaluations in teaching by students and the department head, Shiu said that the decision had "totally been a matter of political persecution".

On 11 November 2020, Shiu resigned from the Legislative Council together with 14 remaining pro-democratic legislators in protest over the unseating of four pro-democratic legislators through a ruling by the central government on the same day.

Drawing on his personal experience of imprisonment in 2019 for his involvement in the Occupy Central movement, Shiu learned about and began to focus on prisoner rights and prison conditions. Later he founded the prisoner rights support and advocacy group Wall-fare to provide support to those imprisoned for their participation in the 2019 Hong Kong anti-government protests. Wall-fare also addressed prison living conditions and advocated for prison reform, such as exposing the Correctional Services Department's interference with inmates' "private meals" and highlighting issues of excessive heat within prisons. Due to pressure from various sources including political pressure, Shiu announced the disbandment of Wall-fare in September 2021, bringing an end to the organization's operations.

== Illness and death ==
In early November 2024, Shiu wrote on Facebook that he had felt stomach discomfort the previous month and that, after successive misdiagnoses with excessive stomach acid and gastritis and a later suspicion of a duodenal obstruction, he had been diagnosed with stomach cancer. He had then undergone surgery to remove half of his stomach, resulting in him losing 15 kilograms of weight. In early January 2025, Shiu stated on social media that due to the worsening of his condition, he had begun palliative care.

Shiu died of stomach cancer at Queen Elizabeth Hospital in Hong Kong, on 10 January 2025, at the age of 55.

Legislative Council of Hong Kong
Preceded by Cheung Kwok-che	Member of Legislative Council; Representative for Social Welfare; 2016–2020	Succeeded by Tik Chi-yuen
