= Hong Kong Social Workers' General Union =

- 香港社會工作者總工會
- Founded: 4 May 1980
- Location: Hong Kong
- Key people: Yip Kin-chung, President
- Parent organization: Hong Kong Confederation of Trade Unions (Dissolved since 2021)
- Website: www.hkswgu.org.hk

Hong Kong Social Workers' General Union
- Traditional Chinese: 香港社會工作者總工會
Transcriptions
Yue: Cantonese
- Yale Romanization: Hēung góng séh wuih gūng jok jé júng gūng wuih
- Jyutping: Hoeng1 gong2 se5 wui6 gung1 zok3 ze2 zung2 gung1 wui6

Hong Kong Social Workers' General Union (HKSWGU) is a trade union for the social workers in Hong Kong. It was established in 1980. The current president, Cheung Kwok-che is the member in the Legislative Council of Hong Kong. It is one of the trade unions in pro-democratic Hong Kong Confederation of Trade Unions.

== History ==
The SWGU was founded in 1980 after the movement demanded the government to take efforts to resettle the boat people in Yaumatei's harbour. Many social workers supported the affected residents and were arrested under the Public Order Ordinance in 1979. The social workers leading the movement felt constrained by their official organisation, the Hong Kong Social Workers' Association because it worked cooperatively with the government and did not approve of activists' involvement with the movement. After the incident a group of social workers united and formed the SWGU on 4 May 1980.

Together with the Hong Kong People's Council on Public Housing Policy, the Society for Community Organization, the Hong Kong Christian Industrial Committee, the Hong Kong Professional Teachers' Union, and the Hong Kong Federation of Students, the pressure groups became the backbone of the civil movements in the 1980s, including against bus fares increases in 1980 to 1981, curbing increases in public utility charges in 1983, and shelving the construction of the Daya Bay Nuclear Plant in 1986.

In the 2004 LegCo elections, Cheung Kwok-che, President of SWGU successfully gained a seat in the Social Welfare functional constituency. In 2012 Cheung co-founded the Labour Party with the Lee Cheuk-yan, General Secretary of the Hong Kong Confederation of Trade Unions, SWGU's head union.
