= Social Welfare (constituency) =

Functional constituency in Hong Kong

Social Welfare 社會福利界
- Functional constituency for the Legislative Council of Hong Kong
- Region: Hong Kong
- Electorate: 11,217

Current constituency
- Created: 1985
- Number of members: One
- Member: Chan Man-yee (Independent)

The Social Welfare functional constituency (Chinese: 社會福利界功能界別), formerly called Social Services between 1988 and 1995, is a functional constituency in the elections for the Legislative Council of Hong Kong. The constituency was first created as one of the original 12 functional constituency seats for the first ever Legislative Council election in 1985.

It is one of the functional constituencies with the most electorates. As of 2021, there were 13,974 registered voters, including all the social workers registered under the Social Workers Registration Ordinance (Cap. 505). It had also been one of the few functional constituencies held by the pro-democrats before 2021. Since 2021, it has been the only constituency of any kind with a non-pro-Beijing Legislative Council member, instead being represented by a centrist.

== Return members ==
Election	Member	Party
1985	Hui Yin-fat	Independent
1988	Hui Yin-fat	Independent
1991	Hui Yin-fat	Independent
1995	Law Chi-kwong	Democratic
Not represented in PLC (1997–98)
1998	Law Chi-kwong	Democratic
2000	Law Chi-kwong	Democratic
2004	Fernando Cheung	Independent→Civic
2008	Cheung Kwok-che	SWGU/ADPL→Labour/SWGU
2012	Cheung Kwok-che	Labour/SWGU
2016	Shiu Ka-chun	Independent
2021	Tik Chi-yuen	Third Side
2025	Chan Man-yee	Independent

== Electoral results ==
=== 2020s ===
2025 Legislative Council election: Social Welfare
Party	Candidate	Votes	%	±%
Independent	Grace Chan Man-yee	2,179	46.79	
Independent	Fong Fu-fai	1,755	37.69	
DAB	Chu Lai-ling	723	15.53	−19.8
Majority		424	9.10	
Total valid votes		4,657	100.00	
Rejected ballots		505	9.78	
Turnout		5,162	46.02	+26.61
Registered electors		11,217		
Independent gain from Third Side		Swing		

2021 Legislative Council election: Social Welfare
Party	Candidate	Votes	%	±%
Third Side	Tik Chi-yuen	1,400	56.73	
DAB	Chu Lai-ling	872	35.33	
Independent	Yip Cham-kai	196	7.94	
Majority		528	21.40	
Total valid votes		2,468	100.00	
Rejected ballots		245		
Turnout		2,713	19.41	
Registered electors		13,974		
Third Side gain from Independent		Swing		

=== 2010s ===
2016 Legislative Council election: Social Welfare
Party	Candidate	Votes	%	±%
Independent	Shiu Ka-chun	4,603	40.79	
Independent	Yip Kin-chung	3,858	34.19	
Independent	Kwan Yui-huen	1,255	11.12	
Independent	Tsang Kin-chiu	1,011	8.96	
Independent	Wong Sing-chi	557	4.94	
Majority		745	6.60	
Total valid votes		11,284	100.00	
Rejected ballots		280		
Turnout		11,564	83.65	
Registered electors		13,824		

2012 Legislative Council election: Social Welfare
Party	Candidate	Votes	%	±%
SWGU (Labour)	Cheung Kwok-che	9,078	89.08	+23.04
Independent	Chan Yee-fei	1,113	10.92	
Majority		6,335	78.16	
Total valid votes		10,191	100.00	
Rejected ballots		748		
Turnout		10,939	77.62	
Registered electors		14,093		

=== 2000s ===
2008 Legislative Council election: Social Welfare
Party	Candidate	Votes	%	±%
SWGU	Cheung Kwok-che	5,334	66.04	+27.80
Democratic	Tik Chi-yuen	2,743	33.96	
Majority		2,591	32.08	
Total valid votes		8,077	100.00	
Rejected ballots		507		
Turnout		8,584	68.57	
Registered electors		12,519		
SWGU gain from Civic		Swing		

2004 Legislative Council election: Social Welfare
Party	Candidate	Votes	%	±%
Independent	Cheung Chiu-hung	3,263	39.01	
SWGU	Cheung Kwok-che	3,199	38.24	
Independent	Christine Fong Meng-sang	1,903	22.75	
Majority		64	0.77	
Total valid votes		8,365	100.00	
Rejected ballots		181		
Turnout		8,546	82.13	
Registered electors		10,405		
Independent gain from Democratic		Swing		

2000 Legislative Council election: Social Welfare
Party	Candidate	Votes	%	±%
Democratic	Law Chi-kwong	3,061	65.93	
Independent	Leung Yuet-ming	1,582	34.07	
Majority		1,479	31.86	
Total valid votes		4,643	100.00	
Rejected ballots		522		
Turnout		5,165	65.73	
Registered electors		7,858		
Democratic hold		Swing		

=== 1990s ===
1998 Legislative Council election: Social Welfare
Party	Candidate	Votes	%	±%
Democratic	Law Chi-kwong	Unopposed		
Democratic hold		Swing		

1995 Legislative Council election: Social Welfare
Party	Candidate	Votes	%	±%
Democratic	Law Chi-kwong	1,115	64.08	
Independent	Chow Wing-sang	625	35.92	
Majority		490	28.16	
Total valid votes		1,740	100.00	
Turnout		612	29.39	
Registered electors		2,082		
Democratic gain from Independent		Swing		

1991 Legislative Council election: Social Services
Party	Candidate	Votes	%	±%
Independent	Hui Yin-fat	Unopposed		
Registered electors		181		
Independent hold		Swing		

=== 1980s ===
1988 Legislative Council election: Social Services
Party	Candidate	Votes	%	±%
Independent	Hui Yin-fat	Unopposed		
Independent hold		Swing		

1985 Legislative Council election: Social Services
Party	Candidate	Votes	%	±%
Independent	Hui Yin-fat	76	54.68	
Independent	Mak Hoi-wah	41	29.50	
Independent	Chan Sau-han	22	15.83	
Majority		35	25.18	
Total valid votes		139	100.00	
Independent win (new seat)				
