= Fernando Cheung =

Hong Kong politician

- 張超雄
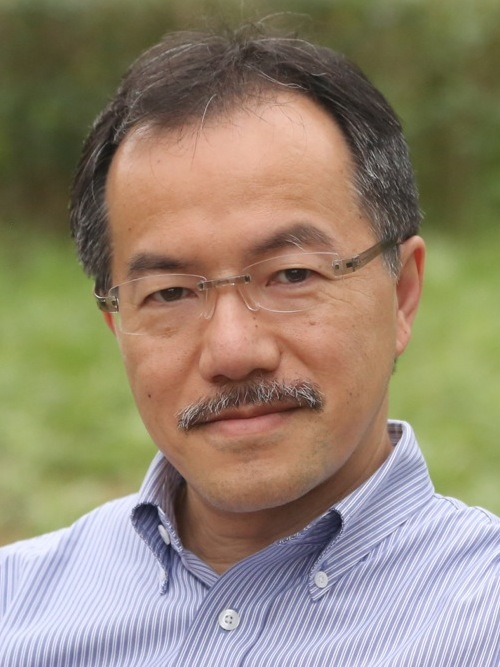
- Cheung in 2013

Member of the Legislative Council
- In office 1 October 2012 – 1 December 2020
- Preceded by: Andrew Cheng
- Succeeded by: Constituency abolished
- Constituency: New Territories East
- In office 1 October 2004 – 30 September 2008
- Preceded by: Law Chi-kwong
- Succeeded by: Cheung Kwok-che
- Constituency: Social Welfare

Personal details
- Born: 23 February 1957 (age 69) Portuguese Macau
- Party: Civic Party (2006–2010); Labour Party (since 2011)
- Children: 3
- Education: St. Paul's College; Hong Kong Baptist University (BSocSc); California State University, Fresno (MSW); University of California, Berkeley (PhD)
- Occupation: Lecturer; Social worker

Fernando Cheung
- Traditional Chinese: 張超雄
- Simplified Chinese: 张超雄
Transcriptions
Standard Mandarin
- Hanyu Pinyin: Zhāng Chāoxióng
Yue: Cantonese
- Yale Romanization: Jēung Chīu hùhng
- Jyutping: Zoeng^{1} Ciu^{1} hung^{4}

Fernando Cheung Chiu-hung (Chinese: 張超雄; born 23 February 1957) is a Hong Kong politician, the vice-chairman of the Labour Party, and a former member of the Legislative Council.

== Career ==
Cheung obtained his undergraduate degree in social work from Hong Kong Baptist University. He worked in the United States from 1988, and became a naturalized United States citizen. He obtained a Master's degree in Social Work from California State University, Fresno, and a Ph.D. degree in Social Welfare from the University of California, Berkeley in 1991 while serving as the head of the Oakland Chinese Community Council. One of his grandparents was born in Peru.

On moving back to Hong Kong in 1996, he became a lecturer at the Hong Kong Polytechnic University. He became the vice-convener of Civil Human Rights Front in 2002, where he had developed a close relationship with the pro-democrats. He joined the functional constituency of social welfare of the Legislative Council in 2004.

Cheung introduced a motion for the referendum on universal suffrage for the 2007 chief executive elections in Hong Kong. The Standing Committee of the National People's Congress had outlawed universal suffrage for 2007 and 2008, and the Hong Kong government under Chief Executive Tung Chee-hwa said that it had to abide by this decision.

After an unsuccessful bid in the New Territories West constituency in 2008, he rejoined the Legislative Council in 2012 as a representative of New Territories East, and was reelected in 2016.

During the 2014 Hong Kong protests, Cheung acted as a mediator between the two sides, advocating for the protests to remain peaceful. He appeared together with fellow pro-democratic lawmaker Claudia Mo at the Mong Kok protest site on 19 October, resulting in a widening of the buffer zone; no clashes were reported for the night. On 19 November, Cheung and others tried to stop radical protesters from breaking into the side-entrance to the Legislative Council Complex, but were pushed aside.

In July 2018, Cheung declared that he would not stand in the 2020 Legislative Council elections, which were later postponed to 2021.

Cheung was inside the LegCo building with protesters after it was stormed on 1 July 2019 during the 2019–20 Hong Kong protests. He expressed relief that the protesters had safely vacated the building, and had grabbed those refusing to leave.

== National Security Law and resignation ==
In July 2020, after the introduction of the Hong Kong national security law in the city on 30 June 2020, Cheung said on a programme by public broadcaster RTHK that the law had turned Hong Kong from an international city into an ordinary Chinese city overnight, and that he expected an exodus of professionals and young people. He warned the Chinese Communist Party against trying to impose travel restrictions on the city's residents, saying that this would only increase discontent, and against restricting access to the internet, as this would only destabilize social and economic conditions in the city.

On 11 November 2020, 15 democratic lawmakers including Cheung resigned en masse in protest of a decision made by the central government in Beijing the same day, authorizing the Hong Kong government to dismiss politicians who were deemed to be a threat under the national security law. Cheung said that the initial dismissals, which had concerned four democrats, "signifie[d] that the Chinese Communist Party is willing to break laws and rules to eradicate the opposition", and that even if the other democrats had remained in the Legislative Council, the loss of the votes meant that they could have been impeached one by one.

== Arrest and conviction on LegCo contempt charge ==
Cheung was arrested on 1 November 2020, along with six other democrats, in connection with a melee that had broken out in the LegCo on 8 May 2020 when Starry Lee, chair of the LegCo House Committee, commenced a meeting of the Committee after extended stalling tactics of the pan-democratic camp over the previous months. Cheung had repeatedly chanted "Starry Lee abused her powers" in front of her. He pleaded guilty to a contempt charge but not wrongdoing, saying that his persecution had been politically motivated. He was sentenced to three weeks jail on 4 February 2022, the first such conviction since indirect LegCo elections were introduced in 1985. As of 3 May 2022, Cheung is reported to have arrived in Toronto with his family. When Amnesty International opened its Hong Kong Overseas office in April 2025, after the organization had pulled out of the city in 2021, Cheung became one of its board members, and acted as the office's spokesperson in June 2025.

Legislative Council of Hong Kong
Preceded by Law Chi-kwong	Member of Legislative Council; Representative for Social Welfare; 2004–2008	Succeeded by Cheung Kwok-che
Preceded by Andrew Cheng	Member of Legislative Council; Representative for New Territories East; 2012–2020	Constituency abolished
