= Cheung Kwok-che =

The Honourable Cheung Kwok-che
- 張國柱
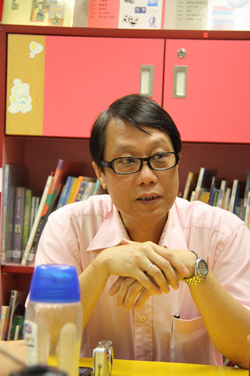

Member of the Legislative Council
- In office 1 October 2008 – 30 September 2016
- Preceded by: Fernando Cheung
- Succeeded by: Shiu Ka-chun
- Constituency: Social Welfare

Personal details
- Born: 8 November 1951 (age 74) Guangzhou, Guangdong, China
- Party: Labour Party
- Other political affiliations: Association for Democracy and People's Livelihood (until 2010)
- Occupation: Social worker

Cheung Kwok-che
- Traditional Chinese: 張國柱
- Simplified Chinese: 张国柱
Transcriptions
Yue: Cantonese
- Yale Romanization: Jēung Gwok Chyúh
- Jyutping: Zoeng^{1} Gwok^{3} Cyu^{5}

Peter Cheung Kwok-che (born 8 November 1951, Chinese: 張國柱) is a former member of the Legislative Council of Hong Kong (Functional constituency, Social Welfare), with the Labour Party.

He is a social worker at Hong Kong Caritas Service for Young People and President of the Hong Kong Social Workers General Union. He beat Tik Chi Yuen to win his seat of the functional constituency (social welfare) in the 2008 Legislative Council election and held the seat until retiring at the 2016 election.

Legislative Council of Hong Kong
Preceded by Fernando Cheung	Member of Legislative Council; Representative for Social Welfare; 2008–2016	Succeeded by Shiu Ka-chun
