= Legislative Council (Amendment) Ordinance 2012 =

Legislation of Hong Kong

Legislative Council of Hong Kong
- Long title: An Ordinance to amend the Legislative Council Ordinance to impose a restriction on the nomination of candidates at a by-election of the Legislative Council.
- Citation: Ordinance No. 12 of 2012
- Passed by: Legislative Council of Hong Kong
- Passed: 1 June 2012
- Commenced: 8 June 2012

Legislative history
- Introduced by: Secretary for Constitutional and Mainland Affairs Raymond Tam
- Introduced: 3 February 2012
- First reading: 8 February 2012
- Second reading: 16 May 2012
- Third reading: 1 June 2012
- Committee report: Report of the Bills Committee on Legislative Council (Amendment) Bill 2012

Related legislation
- Legislative Council Ordinance
- Status: Amended

The Legislative Council (Amendment) Ordinance 2012 is an ordinance of the Legislative Council of Hong Kong. It amends the Legislative Council Ordinance Cap. 542 § 39 to disqualify a resigned member of the Legislative Council from participating in a subsequent by-election. The original proposal was to avoid by-elections but it sparked vast controversies in the community. The revised ordinance restricts a resigned member of the Legislative Council from standing in any by-elections within six months.

== Background ==
In January 2010, five pro-democracy Legislative Council members from each of the five geographical constituencies resigned to trigger territory-wide by-elections for the purpose of instigating a so-called “referendum”. They stood in the by-elections and were all re-elected. The 2010 by-election launched by the pro-democracy legislators was strongly criticised by the Beijing government. As government claimed that "views received during the public consultation on the arrangements for filling vacancies in the LegCo indicate that more people consider that the phenomenon of Members resigning at will, triggering by-elections in which they seek to stand, is a mischief that needs to be addressed," the government therefore tried to change the electoral system to plug the "loophole".

== Proposal ==
In mid-May 2011, the government revealed its plan to do away with by-elections entirely. Unveiling the proposal, Secretary for Constitutional and Mainland Affairs Stephen Lam cited the practice elsewhere: "In some countries where the proportional representation (PR) system is adopted, by-elections are not used to fill vacant seats arising mid-term." According to the plan published on 8 June 2011, a Legislative Council seat in any geographical constituency or one of the five newly created district council 'superconstituencies' vacated by the resignation or death of a legislator would be filled by a 'leapfrog' mechanism by the next best placed candidate at the previous election.

The consultation document was opposed by the pro-democracy camp, professionals and legal experts. The government tabled a bill to amend current legislation for by-elections for 13 July 2011. However, by late June, the bill's future looked in doubt when the Central Government Liaison Office suggested a re-think. On 28 June, the government revised its proposal stipulating replacement by an unsuccessful candidate on the same election ticket. Whilst pro-government legislators declared support for the revised plan in principle, Regina Ip stated that consultation would still be desirable. The government bowed to pressure and announced one week later that it would suspend reading of the bill for two months, pending consultations on the revised proposals.

In July 2011, the Government published a consultation paper in which four options were proposed with regard to the arrangements for filling vacancies in the Legislative Council. Options to fill a casual vacancy arising mid-term in the Legislative Council:

1. restricting resigning Members from participating in any by-election in the same term,
2. a replacement mechanism using the same candidate list followed by a precedence list system (the Administration's revised proposal),
3. a replacement mechanism which does not cover causal vacancies arising from death, serious illness or other involuntary circumstances; and
4. a replacement mechanism using the same candidate list, followed by leaving the seat vacant when the list is exhausted.

After the consultation, the government modified the bill to bar the resigning legislator from running again for six months.

== Criticisms ==
The original proposal attracted criticism from Pan-Democrats as it was seen as depriving citizens of their political rights; even pro-government figures in the legislature expressed reservations about the workability of the plan. The pan democrats remained in opposition to any restriction of the electoral system.

A researcher in Britain's Electoral Reform Society said it was indeed common for vacancies to be filled by a candidate who was next-in-line, but one who was on the specific list of the outgoing. He said that the proposal meant that a seat held by a small party (without a list) would automatically go to another party if its representative resigned or died, thereby entirely losing representation.

The Hong Kong Bar Association four strongly worded public warnings within two weeks of the first announcement of the plan, stating that the government's change violated the International Covenant on Civil and Political Rights and Hong Kong Bill of Rights. The Bar Association also opposed the revised proposal as its violation to the right to stand for election and right to elect guaranteed in the Article 26 of the Basic Law.

Academics echoed the sentiments, and also brought to light the possibility, albeit slim, that the new mechanism may abet assassinations.

== Filibuster ==
Albert Chan and Wong Yuk-man of People Power start the filibuster by submitting 1306 amendments altogether to the revised Legislative Council (Amendment) Bill. Leung Kwok-hung of the League of Social Democrats and Andrew Cheng also participated in the filibustering. Miriam Lau of the Liberal Party carried out a 30-hour hunger strike to voice her opposition against such act of obstructionism and waste of public coffers. The Legislative Council carried on multiple overnight debates on the amendments with the support of the pro-Beijing camp.

On morning of 17 May 2012, Jasper Tsang Yok-sing, President of the Legco adopt Rule 92 of the Rule of Procedure, which allows the president follow foreign parliament rules for unregulated behaviors to terminate the debate. In the end, all amendments were defeated and the Bill was passed on 1 June 2012.
