= Labour Party (Hong Kong) =

Labour Party 工黨
- Chairman: Kwok Wing-kin
- Vice-Chairmen: Tam Leung-ying; Mak Tak-ching; Lee Cheuk-yan
- Founded: 18 December 2011; 14 years ago
- Headquarters: 19/F, Wing Wong; Commercial Bldg, 557–559 Nathan Road, Mong Kok; Kowloon, Hong Kong
- Membership (2011): ▲ ~200
- Ideology: Social democracy Environmentalism; Liberalism (HK)
- Political position: Centre-left
- Regional affiliation: Pro-democracy camp
- Colours: Orange and green
- Legislative Council: 0 / 90
- District Councils: 0 / 470

Website
- www.labour.org.hk

Labour Party
- Traditional Chinese: 工黨
- Simplified Chinese: 工党
Transcriptions
Standard Mandarin
- Hanyu Pinyin: Gōngdǎng
- Bopomofo: ㄍㄨㄥ ㄉㄤˇ
- Wade–Giles: Kung^{1}-tang^{3}
- IPA: [kʊ́ŋ.tàŋ]
Yue: Cantonese
- Yale Romanization: Gūng dóng
- Jyutping: Gung1 dong2
- IPA: [kʊŋ˥ tɔŋ˧˥]

The Labour Party is a centre-left social democratic political party in Hong Kong, established in 2011.

The party was founded in 2011 by three pro-democracy legislators to consolidate centre-left, pro-labour and pro-democracy voices in the legislature. Led by Lee Cheuk-yan, then general secretary of the Hong Kong Confederation of Trade Unions (HKCTU), the party won four seats in the 2012 Legislative Council election, with about six per cent of the popular vote, making it the third-largest political party in the pro-democracy camp and the sixth-largest in the legislature.

The party lost both Cheuk-yan and Cyd Ho in the 2016 election, leaving Fernando Cheung as its only representative in the legislature, representing New Territories East. Cheung resigned in November 2020, together with 14 legislators of the pro-democratic camp, in protest against the disqualification of four other members of the camp by the Hong Kong government.

== Beliefs ==
The Labour Party positions itself as a social democratic party based on the principles of "Democracy, Justice, Sustainability and Solidarity". It also supports universal suffrage, competition legislation, the rehabilitation of the 1989 democracy movement, and opposition to Article 23 legislation.

The Labour Party was the first major party to adopt a policy supporting laws to prohibit discrimination against the LGBT community.

== History ==
The idea of establishing a pro-labour party first emerged in the 1990s, when four pro-labour pro-democracy legislators, Lau Chin-shek and Lee Cheuk-yan from the Hong Kong Confederation of Trade Unions (CTU), Leung Yiu-chung from the Neighbourhood and Worker's Service Centre (NWSC) and Tsang Kin-shing from the Democratic Party set up a joint office in preparation of the labour party, but the idea did not realise at last.

In early 2011, Lee Cheuk-yan expressed interest in forming a new labour party, and discussed the details with legislators Leung Yiu-chung, Cheung Kwok-che from the Hong Kong Social Workers' General Union (SWGU), Cyd Ho from the Civic Act-up and Fernando Cheung, an ex-Civic Party politician. Cheung was the first to advocate the formation of a labour party for the labour rights, new immigrants, ethnic minorities and environmental issues in the coming 2012 Legislative Council election.

The Labour Party was officially founded on 18 December 2011. The New World First Bus Company Staff Union, the KMB Staff Union and the Hong Kong Buildings Management And Security Workers General Union under the CTU and Civic Act-up joined the party as affiliated groups. The NWSC vetoed the motion of joining the Labour Party. A 20-strong Executive Committee was elected with CTU General Secretary Lee Cheuk-yan was elected unopposed by 131 founding members, while Cyd Ho, Fernando Cheung and Yeung Ho-yan became the Vice-Chairmen, Cheung Kwok-che the Senate chairman, and Tam Chun-yin the General Secretary.

The party filled three lists in the geographical constituency election in the 2012 Legislative Council elections, the incumbent Lee Cheuk-yan and Cyd Ho ran in New Territories West and Hong Kong Island and former legislator Fernando Cheung ran in New Territories East. The party secured four seats with all the lists elected and Cheung Kwok-che returned through the Social Welfare functional constituency. It became the third largest pro-democracy party in the legislature, behind the Democratic Party and the Civic Party.

The party gained its first seat at the district level in the San Fu by-election in 2015. In the 2015 District Council election, the party filled in 12 candidates, of which three were elected. On 13 December 2015, the Labour chairman Lee Cheuk-yan stepped down and three candidates, Kwok Wing-kin, Cheng Sze-lut and Suzanne Wu ran for the chairmanship. Suzanne Wu of the Association for the Advancement of Feminism won the election in the end and became the new chairwoman.

The Labour suffered a major defeat in the 2016 Legislative Council election by losing two veteran legislators Lee Cheuk-yan and Cyd Ho. With the retiring Social Welfare legislator Cheung Kwok-che, the party dropped their seats in the legislature from four to only one. Chairwoman Suzanne Wu, who was running in Kowloon East and pulled out from the race in the last days resigned for the election results.

In August 2017, chairwoman Suzanne Wu resigned and quit the party over an internal rift with veteran member Cyd Ho, who also resigned from all party offices as a result. Vice-chairman Kwok Wing-kin was elected the new chairman in an intra-party election in November 2017.

== Performance in elections ==
=== Legislative Council elections ===
Election	Number of popular votes	% of popular votes	GC seats	FC seats	EC seats	Total seats	+/−	Position
2012	112,140	6.19	3	1		4 / 70	1▲	6th▲
2016	101,860▼	4.70▼	1	0		1 / 70	3▼	10th▼
2021	Did not contest		0	0	0	0 / 90	0	N/A

=== District Council elections ===
Election	Number of popular votes	% of popular votes	Total elected seats	+/−
2015	23,029	1.59	3 / 431	2▲
2019	28,036▲	0.96▼	7 / 452	4▲

== Leadership ==
=== Chairmen ===
- Lee Cheuk-yan, 2011–2015
- Suzanne Wu, 2015–2017
  - Chiu Shi-shun, acting 2017
- Kwok Wing-kin, 2017–present

=== Vice Chairmen (External Affairs) ===
- Cheng Sze-lut, 2011–2015
- Lee Cheuk-yan, 2015–present

=== Vice Chairmen (Party Affairs) ===
- Tam Chun-yin, 2011–2015
- Chiu Shi-shun, 2015–2017
- Tam Leung-ying, 2017–present

=== Vice Chairmen (Policy) ===
- Fernando Cheung, 2011–2015
- Kwok Wing-kin, 2015–2017
- Mak Tak-ching, 2017–present

=== General Secretaries ===
- Kwok Wing-kin, 2011–2015
- Tam Chun-yin, 2015–2017
- Lee Man-fung, 2017–present

== See also ==
- League of Social Democrats
