= List of Legislative Council of Hong Kong members elected in 1995 =

This is a list of Members elected to the last Legislative Council in the colonial period at the 1995 election, held on 17 September 1995.

== Composition ==
Affiliation	Election	At dissolution
Democratic Party	19	19
Hong Kong Association for Democracy and People's Livelihood	4	4
The Frontier	0	4
123 Democratic Alliance	1	1
Citizens Party	0	1
Hong Kong Confederation of Trade Unions	1	0
Neighbourhood and Worker's Service Centre	1	0
Ind. democrat	5	2
Total for Pro-democracy camp	31	31
Liberal Party	10	10
Democratic Alliance for the Betterment of Hong Kong	6	6
Breakfast Group	5	5
Hong Kong Progressive Alliance	1	2
Liberal Democratic Federation of Hong Kong	1	1
New Hong Kong Alliance	1	1
Hong Kong Federation of Trade Unions	1	1
Federation of Hong Kong and Kowloon Labour Unions	1	1
Civil Force	1	0
Pro-Beijing independents	2	2
Total for Pro-Beijing camp	29	29
Total	60	60

Note: Italic represents organizations that still function but become under another affiliation.

== Graphical representation of the Legislative Council ==

Pro-democracy camp:
- Frontier
- Citizens Party
- Democratic Party
- ADPL
- 123 Democratic Alliance
- Independents
Pro-Beijing camp:
- Liberal Party
- Breakfast Group
- New Hong Kong Alliance
- LDF
- Progressive Alliance
- DAB
- FTU
- FLU
- Independents

== List of Members elected in the legislative election ==
The following table is a list of LegCo members elected on 17 September 1995.

Key to changes since legislative election:

^{a} = change in party allegiance
^{b} = by-election

Selection Method	Constituency	Elected Members	Elected Party	Political Alignment	Born	Assumed Office
GC	New Territories South-east	Andrew Wong	Independent	Pro-democracy	11 December 1943	1985
GC	New Territories North-east	Allen Lee	Liberal	Pro-Beijing	24 April 1940	1978
FC	Wholesale and Retail	Selina Chow	Liberal	Pro-Beijing	25 January 1945	1981
GC	Hong Kong Island East	Martin Lee	Democratic	Pro-democracy	8 June 1938	1985
FC	Finance	David Li	Independent	Pro-Beijing	13 March 1939	1985
FC	Industrial (Second)	Ngai Shiu-kit	Liberal	Pro-Beijing	14 November 1924	1985
GC	Kowloon East	Szeto Wah	Democratic	Pro-democracy	28 February 1931	1985
FC	Rural	Lau Wong-fat	Liberal	Pro-Beijing	15 October 1936	1985
FC	Architectural, Surveying and Planning	Edward Ho	Liberal	Pro-Beijing	2 December 1938	1987
FC	Real Estate and Construction	Ronald Joseph Arculli	Liberal	Pro-Beijing	2 January 1939	1988
FC	Transport and Communication	Miriam Lau	Liberal	Pro-Beijing	27 April 1947	1988
FC	Medical	Edward Leong	Breakfast Group	Pro-Beijing	23 April 1939	1988
GC	New Territories Central	Albert Chan	Democratic	Pro-democracy	3 March 1955	1991
FC	Education	Cheung Man-kwong	Democratic	Pro-democracy	15 September 1954	1991
FC	Financial Services	Chim Pui-chung	Independent	Pro-Beijing	24 September 1946	1991
GC	Kowloon West	Frederick Fung	ADPL	Pro-democracy	17 March 1953	1991
FC	Health Services	Michael Ho	Democratic	Pro-democracy	6 November 1955	1991
GC	Hong Kong Island West	Huang Chen-ya	Democratic	Pro-democracy	4 November 1939	1991
GC	New Territories East	Emily Lau	Independent^{a}	Pro-democracy	22 January 1952	1991
GC	New Territories South-west	Lee Wing-tat	Democratic	Pro-democracy	25 December 1955	1991
FC	Accountancy	Eric Li	Breakfast Group	Pro-Beijing	23 May 1953	1991
GC	Kowloon South-east	Fred Li	Democratic	Pro-democracy	25 April 1955	1991
FC	Import and Export	Henry Tang	Liberal	Pro-Beijing	6 September 1952	1991
GC	Kowloon South-west	James To	Democratic	Pro-democracy	11 March 1963	1991
FC	Engineering	Samuel Wong	Breakfast Group	Pro-Beijing	2 November 1937	1991
FC	Commercial (Second)	Philip Wong	NHKA	Pro-Beijing	23 December 1938	1991
GC	Hong Kong Island South	Yeung Sum	Democratic	Pro-democracy	22 November 1947	1991
FC	Tourism	Howard Young	Liberal	Pro-Beijing	30 March 1948	1991
GC	New Territories North-west	Zachary Wong	Democratic	Pro-democracy	22 December 1957	1991 (b)
GC	Hong Kong Island Central	Christine Loh	Independent^{a}	Pro-democracy	1 February 1956	1992
FC	Industrial (First)	James Tien	Liberal	Pro-Beijing	8 January 1947	1993 (b)
FC	Manufacturing	Lee Cheuk-yan	CTU^{a}	Pro-democracy	12 February 1957	1995 (b)
EC	Election Committee	Chan Kam-lam	DAB	Pro-Beijing	22 January 1949	1995
FC	Hotels and Catering	Chan Wing-chan	DAB	Pro-Beijing	7 July 1935	1995
GC	Kowloon North-east	Chan Yuen-han	DAB	Pro-Beijing	15 November 1946	1995
FC	Financing, Insurance, Real Estate and Business Services	Andrew Cheng	Democratic	Pro-democracy	28 April 1960	1995
FC	Commercial (First)	Paul Cheng	Breakfast Group	Pro-Beijing	19 October 1936	1995
FC	Labour	Cheng Yiu-tong	FTU	Pro-Beijing	14 October 1948	1995
EC	Election Committee	Anthony Cheung	Democratic	Pro-democracy	17 November 1952	1995
GC	New Territories North	Cheung Hon-chung	DAB	Pro-Beijing	25 May 1958	1995
EC	Election Committee	Choy Kan-pui	Civil Force^{a}	Pro-Beijing	5 August 1929	1995
EC	Election Committee	David Chu	LDF^{a}	Pro-Beijing	5 March 1943	1995
GC	New Territories West	Albert Ho	Democratic	Pro-democracy	1 December 1951	1995
EC	Election Committee	Ip Kwok-him	DAB	Pro-Beijing	8 November 1951	1995
GC	Kowloon South	Lau Chin-shek	Democratic	Pro-democracy	12 September 1944	1995
EC	Election Committee	Ambrose Lau	Progressive Alliance	Pro-Beijing	16 July 1947	1995
EC	Election Committee	Law Cheung-kwok	ADPL	Pro-democracy	26 September 1949	1995
FC	Social Welfare	Law Chi-kwong	Democratic	Pro-democracy	1 November 1953	1995
FC	Labour	Lee Kai-ming	FLU	Pro-Beijing	11 October 1937	1995
FC	Textiles and Garments	Leung Yiu-chung	NSWC^{a}	Pro-democracy	19 May 1953	1995
GC	Kowloon Central	Bruce Liu	ADPL	Pro-democracy	8 October 1958	1995
EC	Election Committee	Lo Suk-ching	Breakfast Group	Pro-Beijing	22 June 1950	1995
FC	Urban Council	Mok Ying-fan	ADPL	Pro-democracy	15 January 1951	1995
FC	Legal	Margaret Ng	Independent	Pro-democracy	25 January 1948	1995
FC	Regional Council	Ngan Kam-chuen	DAB	Pro-Beijing	12 December 1947	1995
GC	New Territories South	Sin Chung-kai	Democratic	Pro-democracy	15 June 1960	1995
FC	Primary Production, Power and Construction	Tsang Kin-shing	Democratic	Pro-democracy	26 January 1956	1995
EC	Election Committee	John Tse	Democratic	Pro-democracy	12 September 1954	1995
FC	Community, Social and Personal Services	Elizabeth Wong	Independent^{a}	Pro-democracy	15 September 1937	1995
EC	Election Committee	Lawrence Yum	123DA	Pro-democracy	23 November 1948	1995

== Other changes ==
- Independent legislator Emily Lau (New Territories East), Lau Chin-shek (Kowloon West) of the Democratic Party, Lee Cheuk-yan (Manufacturing) of the Hong Kong Confederation of Trade Unions, Leung Yiu-chung (Textiles and Garments) of the Neighbourhood and Worker's Service Centre, and Independent Elizabeth Wong (Community, Social and Personal Services) co-founded The Frontier on 26 August 1996.
- Choy Kan-pui (Election Committee), a Civil Force member joined the Hong Kong Progressive Alliance around 1995 to 1996.
- Christine Loh (Hong Kong Island Central) formed the Citizens Party in May 1997.

== See also ==
- 1995 Hong Kong legislative election
