= 1995 Hong Kong municipal elections =

- 5 March 1995

32 (of the 41) seats to the Urban Council 27 (of the 39) seats to the Regional Council
- Registered: 2,450,372 ▲34.46%
- Turnout: 561,778 (22.93%) ▼0.21pp
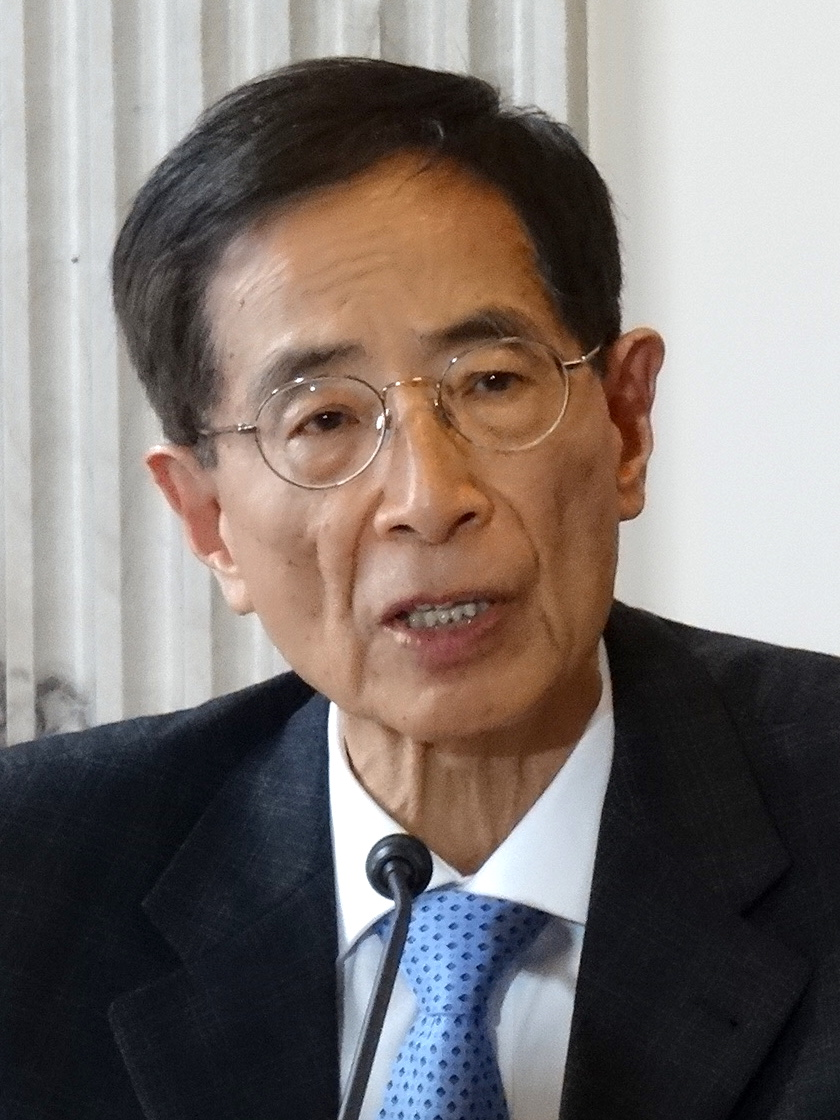

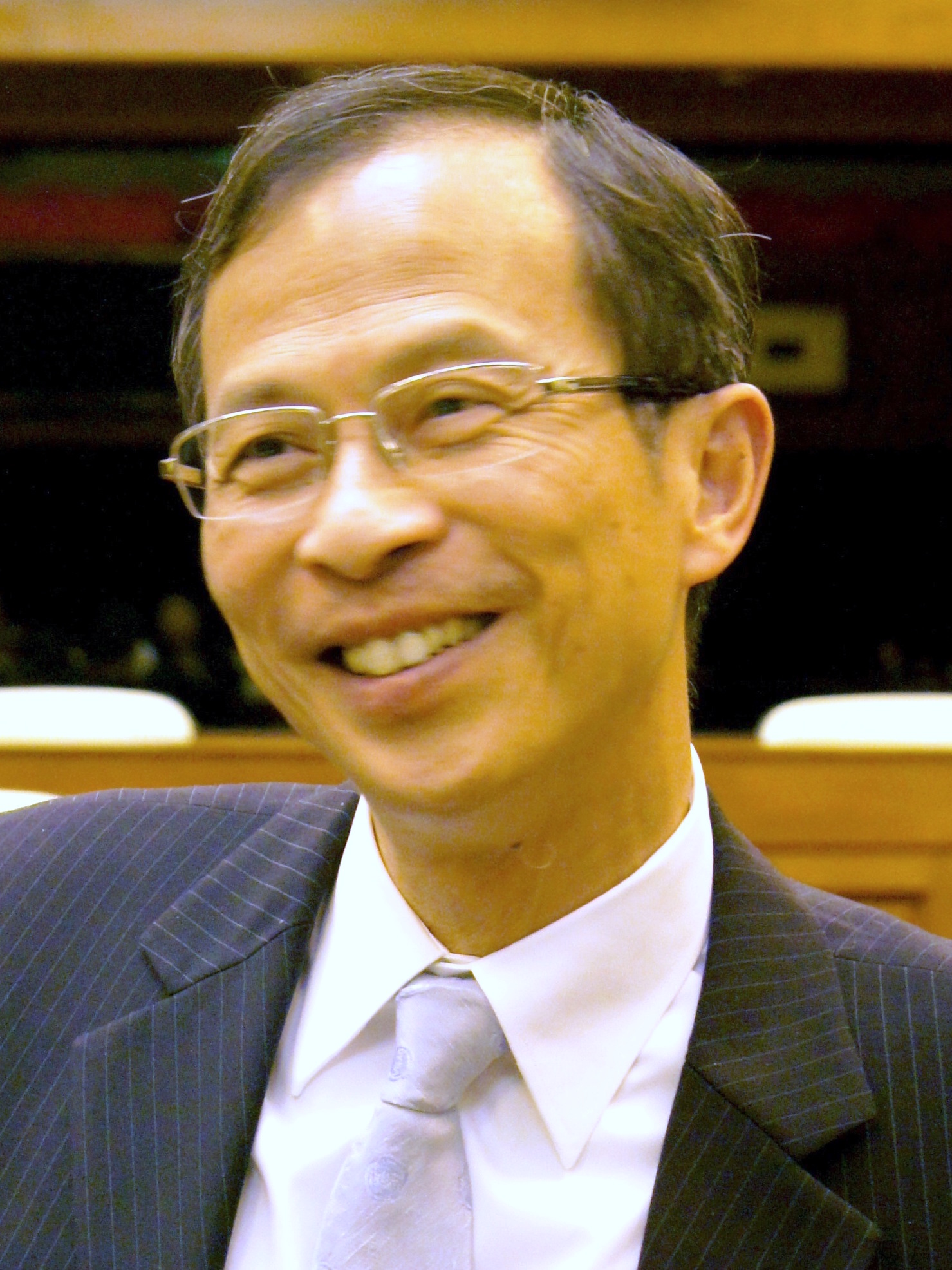

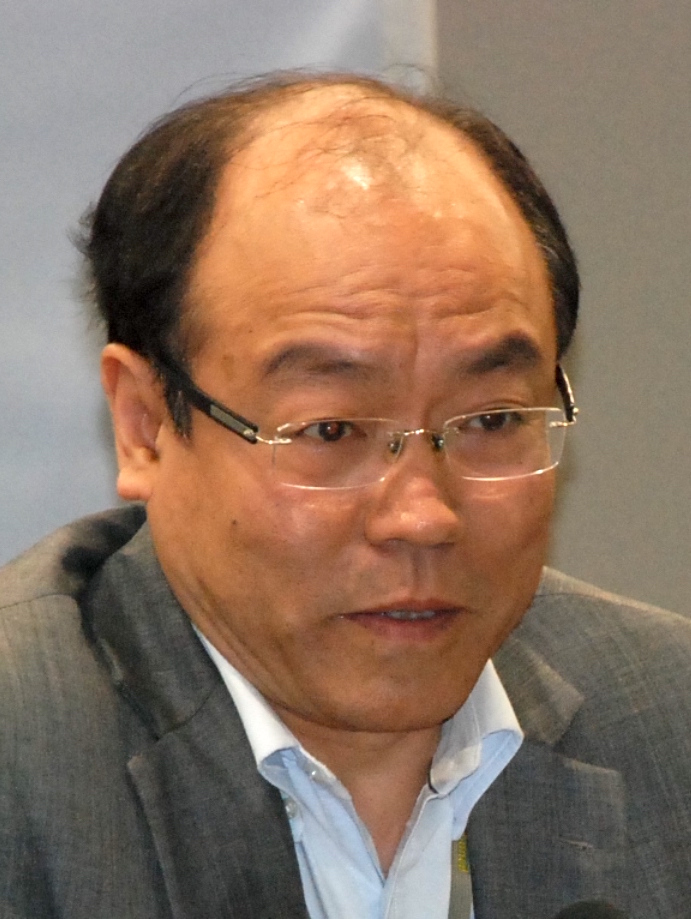

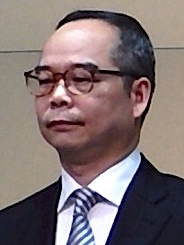

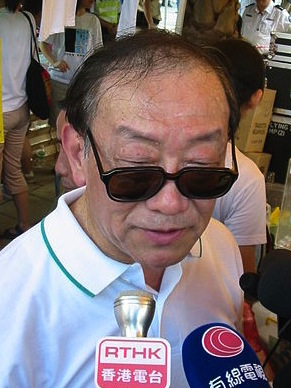
	First party	Second party	Third party
Leader	Martin Lee	Tsang Yok-sing	Frederick Fung
Party	Democratic	DAB	ADPL
Last election	New party	New party	2 seats, 5.37%
Seats won	12 UC; 11 RC	5 UC; 3 RC	5 UC; 3 RC
Seat change	▲12	▲4	▲4
Popular vote	205,823	70,690	38,918
Percentage	36.91%	16.24%	6.98%
Swing	N/A	N/A	▲1.61pp
	Fourth party	Fifth party	Sixth party
Leader	Hu Fa-kuang	Lau Kong-wah	Allen Lee
Party	LDF	Civil Force	Liberal
Last election	3 seats, 9.99%	New party	New party
Seats won	1 UC; 3 RC	0 UC; 1 RC	1 UC; 0 RC
Seat change	▲1	▲1	▲1
Popular vote	25,398	10,546	7,188
Percentage	4.55%	1.89%	1.29%
Swing	▼5.44pp	N/A	N/A
Chairmen before election
Ronald Leung (UC)
Lam Wai-keung (RC)
Elected Chairmen
Ronald Leung (UC)
Lau Wong-fat (RC)

The 1995 Hong Kong Urban Council and Regional Council elections were the municipal elections held on 5 March 1995 for the elected seats of the Urban Council and Regional Council respectively. It was the second of the three-tier elections held in 1995 under Governor Chris Patten's electoral reform, namely the 1994 District Board and 1995 Legislative Council election. The liberal Democratic Party continued its dominance by winning 23 seats in total. Due to the abolishment of the two Councils by Chief Executive Tung Chee-hwa in 1999, this election became the last election.

== Overview ==
Due to the democratisation reform under the governorship of Chris Patten, all the appointed seats since the creations of the Councils were replaced by members of direct elections. 32 seats in the Urban Council was the directly elected by the general residents and 9 seats were elected by the Hong Kong Island and Kowloon District Boards members. For Regional Council, 27 seats were directly elected and 9 seats were elected by the New Territories District Boards members, with 3 ex-officio members of the chairman and two chairmen of the Heung Yee Kuk. The first-past-the-post voting system was used.

Dozens of long-serving Urban and Regional Councillors decided not to stand in the first full-scale municipal-level elections. The most senior member on the Urban Council Brook Bernacchi who was first elected in 1952 would not stand because the council was becoming increasingly politicised. Elsie Tu, the second most senior Councillor was challenged and defeated by the Democratic Party heavyweight Szeto Wah for the Kwun Tong North seat.

As a result, 21 Urban Councillors left in 1995 taking with them a total of 210 years of experience.

After the transfer of sovereignty to the People's Republic of China, Chief Executive Tung Chee-hwa decided to streamline and centralise municipal services as part of his government's policy reforms by dissolving the two Councils. The 1995 election thus became the last election.

== General results ==
Overall Summary of the 5 March 1995 Urban Council and Regional Council of Hong Kong election results
Political Affiliation	Urban Council			Regional Council			Total		
Political Affiliation	Popular votes	Standing	Elected	Popular votes	Standing	Elected	Popular votes	%	Total seats gained
Democratic Party	108,182	19	12	97,641	17	11	205,823	36.91	23
Hong Kong Association for Democracy and People's Livelihood	13,822	5	5	25,096	4	3	38,918	6.98	8
123 Democratic Alliance	1,556	1	0	6,360	2	0	7,916	1.42	0
Hong Kong Democratic Foundation	1,693	2	0	-	-	-	1,693	0.30	0
Chinese Liberal Democratic Party	1,453	1	0	-	-	-	1,453	0.26	0
Pro-democracy individuals	15,171	5	1	16,252	4	2	31,423	5.64	3
Total for pro-democracy parties and allies	141,877	33	18	145,349	27	16	287,226	51.51	34
Democratic Alliance for the Betterment of Hong Kong	70,690	12	5	19,858	5	3	90,548	16.24	8
Liberal Democratic Federation of Hong Kong	9,757	2	1	15,641	4	3	25,398	4.55	4
Civil Force	-	-	-	10,546	2	1	10,546	1.89	1
Liberal Party	3,370	1	1	3,818	2	0	7,188	1.29	1
New Hong Kong Alliance	4,901	1	1	-	-	-	4,901	0.88	1
Hong Kong Chinese Reform Association	3,953	1	1	-	-	-	3,953	0.71	1
United Front for the Service of the People	-	-	-	8,377	3	0	8,377	1.50	0
Hong Kong Progressive Alliance	1,770	1	0	3,508	1	0	5,278	0.95	0
Hong Kong Alliance of Chinese and Expatriates	2,229	1	0	-	-	-	2,229	0.40	0
Public Affairs Society	1,140	1	0	-	-	-	1,140	0.20	0
Hong Kong Civic Association	189	1	0	-	-	-	189	0.03	0
Pro-Beijing Individuals	51,088	17	4	50,308	14	4	101,396	18.18	8
Total for pro-Beijing and conservative parties and allies	149,087	38	13	112,056	31	11	261,143	46.83	24
Non-aligned Individuals and others	4,537	4	1	4,693	2	0	9,230	1.66	1
Total	295,501	75	32	262,098	60	27	557,599	100.00	59

== Result breakdown ==
=== Urban Council ===
District	Constituency	Candidates	Affiliation	Votes	%
Central and Western	UC1 Western	1 Ip Kwok-him	DAB	7,371	47.69
Central and Western	UC1 Western	2 Chan Kwok-leung	Democratic	8,084	52.31
Central and Western	UC2 Central	1 Chan Yuk-cheung	Independent	4,186	40.44
Central and Western	UC2 Central	2 Kam Nai-wai	Democratic	6,164	59.56
Wan Chai	UC3 Wan Chai West	1 San Stephen Wong Hon-ching	CRA	3,953	62.16
Wan Chai	UC3 Wan Chai West	2 Li Kin-yin	Democratic	2,406	37.84
Wan Chai	UC4 Wan Chai East	1 Ada Wong Ying-kay	Independent	3,182	43.78
Wan Chai	UC4 Wan Chai East	2 Thomas Wong Cheung-chi	Independent	143	1.97
Wan Chai	UC4 Wan Chai East	3 Susanna Yeung Wan-king	Independent	1,009	13.88
Wan Chai	UC4 Wan Chai East	4 John Tse Wing-ling	Democratic	2,934	40.37
Eastern	UC5 North Point West	1 Mathias Woo Yan-wai	Independent	2,719	33.98
Eastern	UC5 North Point West	2 Chan Tak-wai	HKDF	1,163	14.54
Eastern	UC5 North Point West	3 Jennifer Chow Kit-bing	Liberal	3,370	42.12
Eastern	UC5 North Point West	4 Yuen King-yuk	Independent	749	9.36
Eastern	UC6 North Point East	1 Wong Kwok-hing	DAB	6,718	82.22
Eastern	UC6 North Point East	2 Shing Wai-pong	CLDP	1,453	17.78
Eastern	UC7 Quarry Bay	1 Joseph Lai Chi-keong	Democratic	5,937	54.35
Eastern	UC7 Quarry Bay	2 Kong Tze-wing	Independent	3,125	28.61
Eastern	UC7 Quarry Bay	3 Yuen Ki-kong	Independent	1,861	17.04
Eastern	UC8 Shau Kei Wan	1 Alexander Fu Yuen-cheung	Independent	1,716	27.26
Eastern	UC8 Shau Kei Wan	2 Hui Ka-hoo	Independent	1,352	21.48
Eastern	UC8 Shau Kei Wan	3 Daniel To Boon-man	Independent	2,860	45.43
Eastern	UC8 Shau Kei Wan	4 Chum Ting-pong	Independent	367	5.83
Eastern	UC9 Chai Wan West	1 Chao Shing-kie	DAB	4,417	46.67
Eastern	UC9 Chai Wan West	2 Manuel Chan Tim-shing	Democratic	5,047	53.33
Eastern	UC10 Chai Wan East	1 Christopher Chung Shu-kun	DAB	7,477	59.96
Eastern	UC10 Chai Wan East	2 Tsang Kin-shing	Democratic	4,994	40.04
Southern	UC11 Aberdeen and Bay Area	1 Joseph Chan Yuek-sut	Independent	uncontested	
Southern	UC12 Ap Lei Chau	1 Ronnie Wong Man-chiu	NHKA	4,901	52.02
Southern	UC12 Ap Lei Chau	2 Andrew Cheng Kar-foo	Democratic	4,520	47.98
Southern	UC13 Pokfulam and Wah Fu	1 Elizabeth Tse Wong Siu-yin	ACE	2,229	28.13
Southern	UC13 Pokfulam and Wah Fu	2 Lai Hok-lim	Democratic	5,696	71.87
Yau Tsim Mong	UC14 Yau Tsim	1 Daniel Wong Kwok-tung	ADPL	5,775	60.10
Yau Tsim Mong	UC14 Yau Tsim	2 Ahuja Gopalda Holaram (Ahuja Gary)	Independent	1,721	17.91
Yau Tsim Mong	UC14 Yau Tsim	3 Li King-wah	Public Affairs Society	1,140	11.86
Yau Tsim Mong	UC14 Yau Tsim	4 Helen Chung Yee-fong	Independent	785	8.17
Yau Tsim Mong	UC14 Yau Tsim	5 Foo Pui-man	Civic	189	1.97
Yau Tsim Mong	UC15 Mong Kok	1 Law Wing-cheung	Independent	3,536	22.80
Yau Tsim Mong	UC15 Mong Kok	2 Chan Kwok-ming	Independent	2,399	21.57
Yau Tsim Mong	UC15 Mong Kok	3 Henry Chan Man-yu	HKDF	530	4.77
Yau Tsim Mong	UC15 Mong Kok	4 Stanley Ng Wing-fai	Democratic	4,656	41.87
Sham Shui Po	UC16 Sham Shui Po West	1 Ha Ving-vung	Democratic	6,734	49.79
Sham Shui Po	UC16 Sham Shui Po West	2 Ambrose Cheung Wing-sum	Independent	6,791	50.21
Sham Shui Po	UC17 Sham Shui Po Central	1 Eric Wong Chung-ki	ADPL	uncontested	
Sham Shui Po	UC18 Sham Shui Po East	1 Tam Kwok-kiu	ADPL	uncontested	
Kowloon City	UC19 Kowloon City North	1 Lee Cheuk-fan	Independent	1,863	27.90
Kowloon City	UC19 Kowloon City North	2 Ronald Leung Ding-bong	Independent	4,815	72.10
Kowloon City	UC20 Kowloon City East	1 Wen Choy-bon	DAB	3,607	53.67
Kowloon City	UC20 Kowloon City East	2 Lam Ming	Independent	3,114	46.33
Kowloon City	UC21 Kowloon City South	1 Pao Ping-wing	LDF	4,224	55.06
Kowloon City	UC21 Kowloon City South	2 Virginia Fung King-man	Independent	3,447	44.94
Kowloon City	UC22 Kowloon City West	1 Wong Siu-yee	LDF	5,533	46.86
Kowloon City	UC22 Kowloon City West	2 Chiang Sai-cheong	Independent	6,275	53.14
Wong Tai Sin	UC23 Wang Tung and Lok Tin	1 Mok Ying-fan	ADPL	uncontested	
Wong Tai Sin	UC24 Wong Tai Sin and Chuk Yuen	1 Lam Man-fai	DAB	9,088	56.07
Wong Tai Sin	UC24 Wong Tai Sin and Chuk Yuen	2 Andrew To Kwan-hang	Democratic	7,120	43.93
Wong Tai Sin	UC25 Tsz Wan Shan and San Po Kong	1 Kan Chi-ho	DAB	4,402	34.11
Wong Tai Sin	UC25 Tsz Wan Shan and San Po Kong	2 Choi Luk-sing	Independent	3,332	25.82
Wong Tai Sin	UC25 Tsz Wan Shan and San Po Kong	3 Lee Kwok-keung	Democratic	5,171	40.07
Wong Tai Sin	UC26 Choi Hung Wan and Ngau Chi Wan	1 Chan Chun-fat	HKPA	1,770	16.04
Wong Tai Sin	UC26 Choi Hung Wan and Ngau Chi Wan	2 Cecilia Yeung Lai-yin	Independent	2,671	24.20
Wong Tai Sin	UC26 Choi Hung Wan and Ngau Chi Wan	3 Wu Chi-wai	Democratic	6,595	59.76
Kwun Tong	UC27 Kwun Tong West	1 Au Yuk-har	ADPL	8,047	52.76
Kwun Tong	UC27 Kwun Tong West	2 Chan Kam-lam	DAB	7,204	47.24
Kwun Tong	UC28 Kwun Tong North	1 Elsie Tu	Independent	6,778	42.49
Kwun Tong	UC28 Kwun Tong North	2 Sze To Wah	Democratic	9,175	57.51
Kwun Tong	UC29 Shun Sau	1 Kwok Bit-chun	DAB	8,725	59.13
Kwun Tong	UC29 Shun Sau	2 Law Chun-ngai	Democratic	6,030	40.87
Kwun Tong	UC30 Kuwn Tong Central	1 Kan Wing-kay	DAB	3,462	37.04
Kwun Tong	UC30 Kuwn Tong Central	2 Hung Chun-fun	Democratic	5,884	62.96
Kwun Tong	UC31 Kwun Tong South	1 Ng Siu-wah	DAB	4,161	37.97
Kwun Tong	UC31 Kwun Tong South	2 Li Wah-ming	Democratic	6,798	62.03
Kwun Tong	UC32 Lam Tin	1 Yiu Cheuk-hung	DAB	4,058	41.19
Kwun Tong	UC32 Lam Tin	2 Li Ting-kit	123DA	1,556	15.80
Kwun Tong	UC32 Lam Tin	3 Francis Tang Chi-ho	Democratic	4,237	43.01

=== Regional Council ===
District	Constituency	Candidates	Affiliation	Votes	%
Tsuen Wan	RC1 Tsuen Wan West	1 Liu Cheung-hin	Independent	1,496	15.04
Tsuen Wan	RC1 Tsuen Wan West	2 Wellington Cheng Wing-kee	Independent	5,183	52.10
Tsuen Wan	RC1 Tsuen Wan West	3 Ip Yeung Fuk-lan	UFSP	3,270	32.87
Tsuen Wan	RC2 Tsuen Wan Central	1 Wong Yin-ping	Independent	192	2.12
Tsuen Wan	RC2 Tsuen Wan Central	2 Au-yeung Po-chun	DAB	3,031	33.51
Tsuen Wan	RC2 Tsuen Wan Central	3 Cosmas Kwong Kwok-chuen	Democratic	4,811	53.18
Tsuen Wan	RC2 Tsuen Wan Central	4 Sarena Young Fuk-ki	UFSP	1,012	11.19
Tsuen Wan	RC3 Tsuen Wan East	1 Sumly Chan Yuen-sum	Independent	5,772	58.50
Tsuen Wan	RC3 Tsuen Wan East	2 Yeung Fuk-kwong	UFSP	4,095	41.50
Tuen Mun	RC4 Tuen Mun East	1 Chan Wan-sang	Independent	5,063	48.05
Tuen Mun	RC4 Tuen Mun East	2 Cheung Yuet-lan	Democratic	5,475	51.95
Tuen Mun	RC5 Tuen Mun West	1 Shung King-fai	123DA	1,481	15.18
Tuen Mun	RC5 Tuen Mun West	2 Yim Tin-sang	ADPL	8,278	84.82
Tuen Mun	RC6 Tuen Mun Central	1 Chan Yau-hoi	DAB	5,062	34.53
Tuen Mun	RC6 Tuen Mun Central	2 Ho Chun-yan	Democratic	9,599	65.47
Tuen Mun	RC7 Tuen Mun North	1 Fung Yau-wai	LDF	4,431	42.99
Tuen Mun	RC7 Tuen Mun North	2 Josephine Chan Shu-ying	Democratic	5,877	57.01
Yuen Long	RC8 Tin Shui Wai	1 Leung Che-cheung	Independent	4,256	50.41
Yuen Long	RC8 Tin Shui Wai	2 Cheung Yin-tung	Democratic	4,186	49.59
Yuen Long	RC9 Yuen Long Town Centre	1 Ngan Kam-chuen	DAB	6,345	56.53
Yuen Long	RC9 Yuen Long Town Centre	2 Mak Ip-sing	123DA	4,879	43.47
Yuen Long	RC10 Yuen Long Rural	1 Ching Chan-ming	Independent	3,868	27.48
Yuen Long	RC10 Yuen Long Rural	2 Tang Wai-ming	Independent	4,831	34.32
Yuen Long	RC10 Yuen Long Rural	3 Lee King-yip	Independent	5,378	38.20
North	RC11 Sheung Shui	1 Wong Sing-chi	Democratic	4,940	43.55
North	RC11 Sheung Shui	2 Au Wai-kwan	Independent	3,471	30.60
North	RC11 Sheung Shui	3 Cheung Kan-kwai	Independent	2,931	25.84
North	RC12 Fanling and Sha Ta	1 Tik Chi-yuen	Democratic	5,980	45.31
North	RC12 Fanling and Sha Ta	2 Cheung Hon-chung	Independent	7,217	54.69
Tai Po	RC13 Tai Po West	1 Johnny Wong Chi-keung	LDF	6,096	57.38
Tai Po	RC13 Tai Po West	2 Fung Chi-wood	Democratic	4,527	42.62
Tai Po	RC14 Tai Po Central	1 Cheng Chun-ping	LDF	uncontested	
Tai Po	RC15 Tai Po East	1 Chan Ping	LDF	5,114	56.15
Tai Po	RC15 Tai Po East	2 Cheung Wing-fai	Democratic	3,994	43.85
Sai Kung	RC16 Sai Kung Rural and Tak Fu	1 Wan Yuet-cheung	Independent	uncontested	
Sai Kung	RC17 Tsueng Kwan O	1 Lam Wing-yin	Democratic	7,165	67.13
Sai Kung	RC17 Tsueng Kwan O	2 Ling Man-hoi	HKPA	3,508	32.87
Sha Tin	RC18 Ma On Shan	1 Robert Chan To-yueng	Democratic	3,965	41.68
Sha Tin	RC18 Ma On Shan	2 Wong Mo-tai	Independent	3,722	39.13
Sha Tin	RC18 Ma On Shan	3 Li Po-ming	Independent	1,826	19.19
Sha Tin	RC19 Sha Tin East	1 Chow Wai-tung	Democratic	6,862	60.84
Sha Tin	RC19 Sha Tin East	2 Ho Sau-mo	Independent	2,813	24.94
Sha Tin	RC19 Sha Tin East	3 Raymond Fu Sze-wai	Liberal	1,604	14.22
Sha Tin	RC20 Sha Tin North	1 Thomas Pang Cheung-wai	DAB	5,420	47.51
Sha Tin	RC20 Sha Tin North	2 Kong Wood-chu	Liberal	2,214	19.41
Sha Tin	RC20 Sha Tin North	3 Lee York-fai	Independent	3,774	33.08
Sha Tin	RC21 Sha Tin South	1 Monnie Chan Yuet-hung	Independent	4,501	42.80
Sha Tin	RC21 Sha Tin South	2 Lam Hong-wah	Civil Force	6,016	57.20
Sha Tin	RC22 Sha Tin West	1 Tong Po-chun	Independent	2,791	21.97
Sha Tin	RC22 Sha Tin West	2 Ho Hau-cheung	Civil Force	4,530	35.66
Sha Tin	RC22 Sha Tin West	3 Ching Cheung-ying	Democratic	5,381	42.36
Kwai Tsing	RC23 Upper Kwai Chung	1 Alan Tam King-wah	Democratic	5,365	71.22
Kwai Tsing	RC23 Upper Kwai Chung	2 Tsui Wing-cheung	Independent	2,168	28.78
Kwai Tsing	RC24 Kwai Chung Central	1 Leung Kwong-cheong	ADPL	7,202	53.10
Kwai Tsing	RC24 Kwai Chung Central	2 Chung Man-fai	Democratic	6,362	46.90
Kwai Tsing	RC25 Tsing Yi South and Lower Kwai Ching	1 Wong Yiu-chung	Democratic	6,342	47.33
Kwai Tsing	RC25 Tsing Yi South and Lower Kwai Ching	2 Ting Yin-wah	ADPL	7,058	52.67
Kwai Tsing	RC26 Tsing Yi North	1 Lee Wing-tat	Democratic	6,810	72.69
Kwai Tsing	RC26 Tsing Yi North	2 Kwok Wai-ling	ADPL	2,558	27.31
Islands	RC27 Islands	1 Lee Kwai-chun	DAB	uncontested	
