= Hong Kong Island West (1991 constituency) =

- Former Geographical constituency for the Legislative Council of Hong Kong
- Boundary of Hong Kong Island West in Hong Kong
- District: Central and Western District; Southern District
- Region: Kowloon
- Electorate: 171,052

Former constituency
- Created: 1991
- Abolished: 1995
- Number of members: Two
- Replaced by: Hong Kong Island South; Hong Kong Island West

Hong Kong Island West was a geographical constituency in the election for the Legislative Council of Hong Kong in 1991, which elects two members of the Legislative Council using the dual-seat constituency dual vote system. The constituency covers Central and Western District and Southern District on Hong Kong Island.

The constituency was divided and replaced by the Hong Kong Island South and Hong Kong Island West constituencies in 1995.

== Returned members ==
Elected members are as follows:

Election	Member	Party	Member	Party
1991	Yeung Sum	UDHK	Huang Chen-ya	UDHK
1994	Yeung Sum	Democratic	Huang Chen-ya	Democratic

== Election results ==
1991 Legislative Council election: Hong Kong Island West
Party	Candidate	Votes	%	±%
United Democrats	Yeung Sum	45,108	34.79	
United Democrats	Huang Chen-ya	31,052	23.95	
Independent	David Chan Yuk-cheung	29,413	22.69	
LDF	Alexander Chang Yau-hung	12,145	9.37	
NHKA	Ronnie Wong Man-chiu	6,113	4.71	
NHKA	Winnie Cheung Wai-sun	5,821	4.50	
Turnout		68,979	40.33	
Registered electors		171,052		
United Democrats win (new seat)				
United Democrats win (new seat)				
