= New Territories South-east (1995 constituency) =

Constituencies in Hong Kong

- Former Geographical constituency for the Legislative Council of Hong Kong
- Boundary of New Territories South-east in Hong Kong
- District: Sai Kung District; Eastern Sha Tin District
- Region: New Territories
- Electorate: 147,995

Former constituency
- Created: 1995
- Abolished: 1997
- Created from: New Territories East
- Replaced by: New Territories East

New Territories South-east was a geographical constituencies in the election for the Legislative Council of Hong Kong in 1995, which elects one member of the Legislative Council using the first-past-the-post voting system. The constituency covers Sai Kung District and eastern part of Sha Tin District in New Territories.

The constituency was merged into the New Territories East constituency in 1998 after the handover of Hong Kong a year before.

== Returned members ==
Elected members are as follows:

Election	Member	Party
1995	Andrew Wong	Independent

== Election results ==
1995 Legislative Council election: New Territories South-east
Party	Candidate	Votes	%	±%
Independent	Andrew Wong Wang-fat	23,666	47.83	
United Ants	Harold Ko Ping-chung	13,828	27.95	
DAB	William Wan Hon-cheung	11,987	24.23	
Majority		9,838	19.88	
Total valid votes		49,481	100.00	
Rejected ballots		755		
Turnout		50,236	33.94	
Registered electors		147,995		
Independent win (new seat)				
