= Community, Social and Personal Services (constituency) =

Community, Social and Personal Services 公共、社會及個人服務界
- Former Functional constituency for the Legislative Council of Hong Kong
- Electorate: 248,987

Former constituency
- Created: 1995
- Abolished: 1997
- Number of members: One
- Member: Elizabeth Wong (Frontier)

The Community, Social and Personal Services functional constituency was in the elections for the Legislative Council of Hong Kong first created in 1995 as one of the nine new functional constituencies under the electoral reform carried out by the then Governor Chris Patten, in which the electorate consisted of total 248,987 eligible voters worked related to the public services, social services and personal services in Hong Kong.

The constituency was abolished with the colonial Legislative Council dissolved after the transfer of the sovereignty in 1997.

== History ==
The Community, Social and Personal Services functional constituency was created in British Hong Kong as a part of the 1994 Hong Kong electoral reform, headed by the Governor of Hong Kong, Chris Patten. The electorate for the constituency consisted of civil servants who worked in the community, social workers and nightclub employees with around 240,000 voters and was first contested at the 1995 Hong Kong legislative election. The election was contested between several former civil servants and trade unionists. The constituency was won by the former Secretary for Health and Welfare, Elizabeth Wong. Whilst she was elected as an independent, Wong joined The Frontier in 1996.

Ahead of the handover of Hong Kong to the People's Republic of China, the Chinese government announced that they believed the electoral reform was in breach of the Sino-British Joint Declaration and stated that the elected Legislative Council would be abolished upon handover with a Chinese selected Provisional Legislative Council appointed in its place from 1997. The constituency was abolished with the Legislative Council dissolved after the transfer of the sovereignty and no functional constituencies were included in the Provisional Legislative Council. The Community, Social and Personal Services constituency was not recreated for the 1998 Hong Kong legislative election under the Special Administrative Region government when the functional constituencies returned.

== Councillors represented ==
Election	Member	Party
1995	Elizabeth Wong	Independent
1996	Elizabeth Wong	Frontier
1997	Legislative Council dissolved	

== Election results ==
1995 Legislative Council election: Community, Social and Personal Services
Party	Candidate	Votes	%	±%
Independent	Elizabeth Wong Chien Chi-lien	40,649	41.75	
DLA	Michael Siu Yin-ying	33,596	34.50	
Independent	Kwok Yuen-hon	14,452	14.84	
Independent	Brian Kan Ping-chee	6,290	6.46	
Independent	Fan Kwok-wah	2,386	2.45	
Majority		7,053	7.24	
Total valid votes		97,373	100.00	
Rejected ballots		6,415		
Turnout		103,788	41.68	
Registered electors		248,987		
Independent win (new seat)				
