= Ant Alliance =

The Ant Alliance (or United Ants; Chinese: 蟻聯) was a short-lived civil group in the 1990s that was informally started by workers and professionals for the protection of civil and political rights. These are outlined in the Hong Kong Bill of Rights Ordinance, to help the Hong Kong government preserve human rights and democracy because of the uncertainties in the post-1997 era.

One of the members, Lee Miu-ming, lost a lawsuit against the government's functional constituency in the Legislative Council of Hong Kong in which they argued that it violated the Bill of Rights Ordinance and its principle of equal voting.

In the summer of 1994, the group gained media attention by criticizing four members of the Meeting Point (Leong Che-hung, Fred Li, Tik Chi-yuen and Zachary Wong) for abstaining from voting for Emily Lau's (the then pro-democracy Independent legislator for the New Territories East constituency) full-scale direct election amendment of Governor Chris Patten's 1995 LegCo election bill.

Law Yuk-kai, director of the Hong Kong Human Rights Monitor, was their leader. Many notable members of the Ant Alliance including Cyd Ho, who joined the newly formed Pro-democracy party, the Frontier in 1996.
