= Hong Kong Alliance of Chinese and Expatriates =

Hong Kong Alliance of Chinese and Expatriates 香港中外聯盟
- Chairperson: Guy Lam
- Founded: 1994
- Dissolved: 2007
- Ideology: Conservatism (HK)
- Regional affiliation: Pro-Beijing camp

The Hong Kong Alliance of Chinese and Expatriates (Chinese: 香港中外聯盟) was a small political party in Hong Kong set up in 1994. The party ceased to exist in 2007.

== History ==
The party was founded, aimed at upholding the Hong Kong residents holding foreign passports. It took a conservative and pro-Beijing stance as its Chairman Guy Lam Kwok-hung, who was a Canadian citizen, said Hong Kong should not be hostile towards Beijing as it was reverting to mainland China. Lam himself ran the party from Shenzhen as a protest against high property rents in Hong Kong. Lam also said he believed it was fortunate the Tiananmen Square protests occurred before the huge changes in Eastern Europe as Hong Kong would need a stable China.

The party supported the introduction of British National (Overseas) passports but expressed concern over its acceptance by third-party countries aside of the United Kingdom and China. They also protested against proposed work visa terms that were given to British citizens following British rule. The Immigration Department announced that whilst British citizens working in the Special Administrative Region of Hong Kong after the handover would need a visa, if they already had jobs then their policy would be to presume to grant the visa.

Guy Lam and Tse Wong Siu-yin campaigned for a seat for the party in the Legislative Council in the 1995 elections, but lost to Democratic Party's Huang Chen-ya in Island West constituency. In 2007, the Hong Kong Police Force announced that they were removing the party from the list of societies on the grounds that it had ceased to exist.

== Election performances ==
=== Legislative council elections ===
Election	Number of popular votes	% of popular votes	GC seats	FC seats	EC seats	Total seats	+/−	Position
1995	3,979	8.47	0	0	0	0 / 70	–	–
