= Hong Kong Island West (1995 constituency) =

- Former Geographical constituency for the Legislative Council of Hong Kong
- Boundary of Hong Kong Island West in Hong Kong
- District: Central and Western District; Southern District
- Region: Hong Kong Island
- Electorate: 143,030

Former constituency
- Created: 1995
- Abolished: 1997
- Created from: Hong Kong Island West
- Replaced by: Hong Kong Island

Hong Kong Island West was a geographical constituency in the election for the Legislative Council of Hong Kong in 1995, which elects one member of the Legislative Council using the first-past-the-post voting system. The constituency covers Central and Western District and parts of Southern District on Hong Kong Island.

The constituency was merged into the Hong Kong Island constituency in 1998 after the handover of Hong Kong a year before.

== Returned members ==
Elected members are as follows:

Election	Member	Party
1995	Huang Chen-ya	Democratic

== Election results ==
1995 Legislative Council election: Hong Kong Island West
Party	Candidate	Votes	%	±%
Democratic	Huang Chen-ya	31,156	66.32	
HKPA	Lam Kin-lai	11,845	25.21	
ACE	Guy Lam Kwok-hung	3,979	8.47	
Majority		16,732	41.11	
Total valid votes		46,980	100.00	
Rejected ballots		658		
Turnout		47,638	33.31	
Registered electors		143,030		
Democratic win (new seat)				
