= Primary Production, Power and Construction (constituency) =

Primary Production, Power and Construction 漁農、礦產、能源及建造界
- Former Functional constituency for the Legislative Council of Hong Kong
- Electorate: 75,174

Former constituency
- Created: 1995
- Abolished: 1997
- Number of members: One
- Member: Tsang Kin-shing (Democratic)
- Replaced by: Agriculture and Fisheries

The Primary Production, Power and Construction functional constituency was in the elections for the Legislative Council of Hong Kong first created for the 1995 LegCo Election as one of the nine new functional constituencies under the electoral reform carried out by the then Governor Chris Patten, in which the electorate consisted of total of 75,174 eligible voters worked related to the agriculture, fisheries, mining, energy and construction sectors.

The Constituency was abolished with the colonial Legislative Council dissolved after the transfer of the sovereignty in 1997.

A similar Agriculture and Fisheries functional constituency was created for the 1998 election by the HKSAR government with a much narrow electorate base which only consists of agriculture and fisheries organisations.

== Councillors represented ==
Election	Member	Party
1995	Tsang Kin-shing	Democratic
1997	Legislative Council dissolved	

== Election results ==
1995 Legislative Council election: Primary Production, Power and Construction
Party	Candidate	Votes	%	±%
Democratic	Tsang Kin-shing	11,592	40.93	
DAB	Poon To-chuen	7,493	26.46	
Independent	Ho Sai-chu	5,366	18.95	
NHKA	Tong Yat-chu	3,871	13.67	
Majority		4,099	14.47	
Total valid votes		28,322	100.00	
Rejected ballots		2,316		
Turnout		30,638	40.76	
Registered electors		75,174		
Democratic win (new seat)				
