= New Territories East (1995 constituency) =

Geographical constituency of Hong Kong

- Former Geographical constituency for the Legislative Council of Hong Kong
- Boundary of New Territories East in Hong Kong
- District: Western Sha Tin District
- Region: New Territories
- Electorate: 165,127

Former constituency
- Created: 1995
- Abolished: 1997
- Created from: New Territories East
- Replaced by: New Territories East

New Territories East was a geographical constituency in the election for the Legislative Council of Hong Kong in 1995, which elects one member of the Legislative Council using the first-past-the-post voting system. The constituency covers western part of Sha Tin District in New Territories.

The constituency was replaced by New Territories East constituency in 1998 after the handover of Hong Kong a year before.

== Returned members ==
Elected members are as follows:

Election	Member	Party
1995	Emily Lau	Independent
1996	Emily Lau	Frontier

== Election results ==
1995 Legislative Council election: New Territories East
Party	Candidate	Votes	%	±%
Independent	Emily Lau Wai-hing	39,265	58.51	
Civil Force	Lau Kong-wah	27,841	41.49	
Majority		11,424	17.02	
Total valid votes		67,106	100.00	
Rejected ballots		432		
Turnout		67,538	40.90	
Registered electors		165,127		
Independent win (new seat)				
