= Hong Kong Island South (1995 constituency) =

- Former Geographical constituency for the Legislative Council of Hong Kong
- Boundary of Hong Kong Island South in Hong Kong
- District: Eastern District; Southern District
- Region: Hong Kong Island
- Electorate: 146,240

Former constituency
- Created: 1995
- Abolished: 1997
- Created from: Hong Kong Island East; Hong Kong Island West
- Replaced by: Hong Kong Island

Hong Kong Island South was a geographical constituency in the election for the Legislative Council of Hong Kong in 1995, which elects one member of the Legislative Council using the first-past-the-post voting system. The constituency covers Eastern District and Southern District on Hong Kong Island.

The constituency was merged into the Hong Kong Island constituency in 1998 after the handover of Hong Kong a year before.

== Returned members ==
Elected members are as follows:

Election	Member	Party
1995	Yeung Sum	Democratic

== Election results ==
1995 Legislative Council election: Hong Kong Island South
Party	Candidate	Votes	%	±%
Democratic	Yeung Sum	32,875	52.36	
DAB	Gary Cheng Kai-nam	29,910	47.64	
Majority		2,965	4.72	
Total valid votes		62,785	100.00	
Rejected ballots		445		
Turnout		63,230	43.24	
Registered electors		146,240		
Democratic win (new seat)				
