= Manufacturing (constituency) =

Functional constituency in Hong Kong

Manufacturing 製造界
- Former Functional constituency for the Legislative Council of Hong Kong
- Electorate: 113,957

Former constituency
- Created: 1995
- Abolished: 1997
- Number of members: One
- Member: Lee Cheuk-yan (Frontier/CTU)

The Manufacturing functional constituency was in the elections for the Legislative Council of Hong Kong first created in 1995 as one of the nine new functional constituencies under the electoral reform carried out by the then Governor Chris Patten, in which the electorate consisted of total 113,957 eligible voters who worked in the manufacturing industry.

The Constituency was abolished when the colonial Legislative Council dissolved after Hong Kong's transfer of sovereignty in 1997.

== Councillors represented ==
Election	Member	Party
1995	Lee Cheuk-yan	CTU
1996	Lee Cheuk-yan	Frontier/CTU
1997	Legislative Council dissolved	

== Election results ==
1995 Legislative Council election: Manufacturing
Party	Candidate	Votes	%	±%
CTU	Lee Cheuk-yan	30,510	69.38	
FTU	Leung Fu-wah	8,535	19.41	
Independent	Chan Ming-yiu	4,931	11.21	
Majority		21,975	49.97	
Total valid votes		43,976	100.00	
Rejected ballots		1,660		
Turnout		45,636	40.05	
Registered electors		113,957		
CTU win (new seat)				
