= Cyd Ho =

Hong Kong politician

Cyd Ho Sau-lan
- 何秀蘭
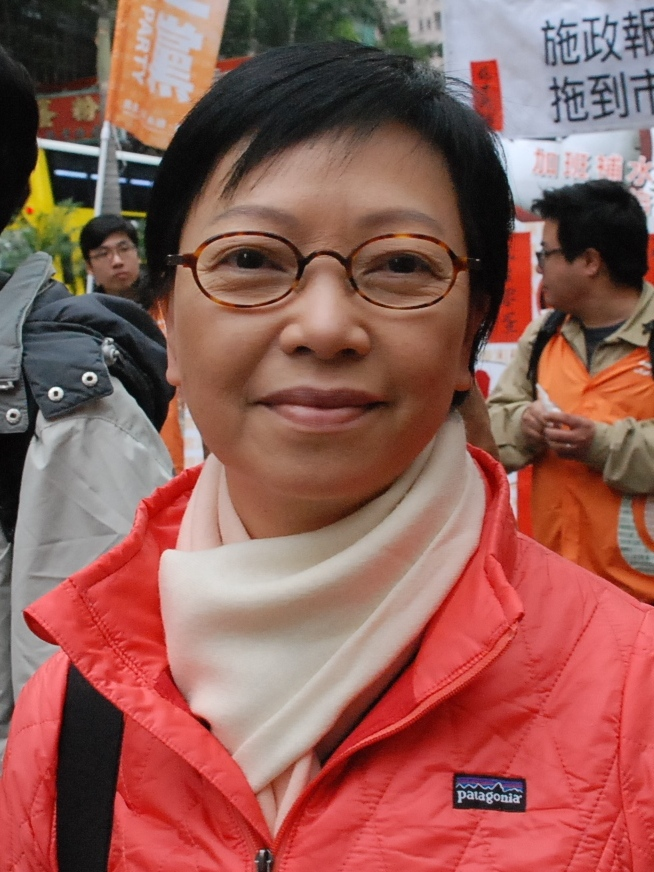
- Cyd Ho campaigning for the 2012 Hong Kong Legislative Council Election.

Member of the Legislative Council
- In office 1 October 2008 – 30 September 2016
- Preceded by: Rita Fan
- Succeeded by: Seat abolished
- Constituency: Hong Kong Island
- In office 1 October 2000 – 30 September 2004
- Preceded by: Christine Loh
- Succeeded by: Ma Lik
- Constituency: Hong Kong Island
- In office 1 July 1998 – 30 June 2000
- Preceded by: New parliament
- Succeeded by: Wong Sing-chi
- Constituency: New Territories East

Personal details
- Born: 24 July 1954 (age 72) British Hong Kong
- Party: United Ants (1993–1996); The Frontier (1996–2004); Civic Act-up (2003–2012); Labour Party (2012–present)
- Education: University of Waterloo
- Occupation: Politician

Cyd Ho
- Traditional Chinese: 何秀蘭
- Simplified Chinese: 何秀兰
Transcriptions
Standard Mandarin
- Hanyu Pinyin: Hé Xiùlán
Yue: Cantonese
- Yale Romanization: Hòh Sau làahn
- Jyutping: Ho^{4} Sau^{3} laan^{4}

Cyd Ho Sau-lan (Chinese: 何秀蘭, born 24 July 1954) is a former member of the Legislative Council of Hong Kong (Legco) for the Hong Kong Island constituency.

She is a founding member of the Labour Party, since December 2011, and currently holds the position of vice-chairwoman. Previously, she was a founding member of The Frontier, another pro-democracy political group. Since 2006, she has been a founding councillor of the World Future Council.

She has garnered a reputation for promoting universal suffrage, rule of law, human rights, and equal opportunity, as well as advancement in the interests of women, homosexuals and other minority groups.

== Education ==
Ho studied at the University of Waterloo, Canada. She worked in the textile trading industry from 1979 to 1995.

== Career ==
In 1991, Ho helped Emily Lau Wai-hing during the election campaign, the first open direct election of Legco in Hong Kong. In 1993, she founded the liberal pressure group 'United Ants' with other pro-democracy political activists. In 1995, she worked as an assistant to Margaret Ng Oi-yee, a lawmaker representing the legal profession in Legco. In 1996, along with other political activists, she founded The Frontier.

She was elected a legislative councillor for the geographical constituency of New Territories East in 1998 in the first Legco election since the transfer of sovereignty over Hong Kong from Great Britain to China. She was re-elected in the c in 2000. She chaired bills committees such as the 2004 Education (Revised) Bill and the 2004 Examination Authority Bill, and was vice-chair of the panel on environmental affairs. She chaired the Sub-committee under the Home Affair Panel to study questions of discrimination based on sexual orientation between 2000 and 2004.

She was elected as a District Council member of the Central and Western district via the Kwun Lung constituency in November 2003, unseating veteran Ip Kwok-him of the Democratic Alliance for the Betterment with a margin of 64 votes. She also supported members of other pro-democracy political groups such as Civic Act-up, which were also contesting seats in the Wanchai district council.

In 2004, she, together with James To Kun-sun, Frederick Fung Kin-kee, Nelson Wong Sing-chi, Michael Mak Kwok-fung, attempted to cross the border and meet Beijing officials at Shenzhen, to request a faster pace of democratisation in Hong Kong.

== 2004 Legco election ==
The 2004 Legislative Council election returned candidates to office based on a party-list proportional representation system. There were four viable tickets running for election for the Hong Kong Island constituency. The left was represented by the Democratic Alliance for the Betterment of Hong Kong's ticket, consisting of Ma Lik and Choy So-yuk; and the centrist ticket was represented by Rita Fan Hsu Lai-tai.

The pan-democratic camp decided, after strategising, to put up two tickets for election: the Democratic Party's ticket with Martin Lee Chu-ming and Yeung Sum, and Audrey Eu Yuet-mee and Cyd Ho's ticket. The thinking was that the remainder vote on both these tickets was sufficient to return all four candidates to office, providing that voters in the pan-democratic camp were coordinated effectively. Cyd Ho was defeated by a slim margin (815 out of a total of about 350,000, or 0.23%) to her nearest DAB rival, Choy So-yuk.

Originally, the slogan "1+1=4" was taken as a way to strategically allocate votes between the two pan-democratic camp tickets, namely that a spouse from each couple would vote for each ticket. Conspiracy theorists claim that, during the final days leading up to the election, the Democratic Party believed it could secure a seat for their third candidate, Lai Chi-Keung. The Democratic Party hence allegedly requested all supporters of the pan-democratic camp in the Hong Kong Island geographical constituency to vote for them, claiming that Audrey Eu's star presence on the other ticket was strong enough to skew votes to the other ticket.

In the end, Lai ended up a few hundred votes short of Cyd Ho, costing them both the chance for a seat. This ultimately benefited Cyd Ho's DAB rival Choy So-yuk. A number of disgruntled voters of the pan-democratic camp demanded that then-DP chairman Yeung Sum and Founding chairman Martin Lee Chu-ming both step down in consequence.

== Post-election ==
In addition to remaining as a key member of the Frontier until 2006, Ho hosted weekly radio programmes on two local radio stations in 2006 – on RTHK and PRHK. She hosted a radio show on the internet radio station My Radio on Thursday nights (2200–2300 HKT).

In 2006, she quit the Frontier and became the chairperson of the Hong Kong Human Rights Monitor and the co-convener of Project Civil Referendum, a scheme to pilot and promote the idea of holding a referendum in Hong Kong.

In 2007, when the death of Ma Lik vacated a Hong Kong Island Legislative Council seat, she originally decided to run in the by-election, but later she decided against. Also, she declined to stand again for her district council seat to prepare for her 2008 Legco election campaign.

== 2008 Legco election ==
Ho stood for and was returned in the Hong Kong Island geographical constituency for the 2008 Hong Kong legislative election. She finished with the fifth highest number of votes in the six-member constituency, 30,887, or 9.85%. Her running mate in 2004, Audrey Eu of the Civic Party, obtained 30,362.

== Labour Party ==
In December 2011, after The Frontier had failed to pass its own resolution to dissolve, she joined with Lee Cheuk-yan, Cheung Kwok-che and others to form the Labour Party, taking up the position of vice-chairwoman. She was re-elected in 2012 elections.

== LGBT rights ==
In 2012, soon after Ho re-elected as member of Legco, she put forward a proposal calling for public consultation on legislation to outlaw discrimination based on sexual orientation. This proposal was supported by most of the pro-democrats and some pro-Beijing lawmakers, but was veto by Democratic Party lawmaker James To (who voted abstained) and pro-Beijing conservative parties. During her terms, Ho is one of only few legislators to openly support same-sex marriage and other LGBT rights, conservative parties and groups criticised her on this issue. Though most of the pro-democrats support non-discrimination laws, they are less openly discuss and talk about this issue, as the pro-democrats have many supporters with many social conservative views.

== 2016 Legco election ==
She lost in the 2016 Hong Kong legislative election with 19,376 votes, placed ninth in the Hong Kong Island constituency, along with the former party chairman Lee Cheuk-yan, leaving the Labour Party only one representative in the legislature.

== 2020 arrest ==
On 18 April 2020, Ho was arrested as one of 15 Hong Kong high-profile democracy figures, on suspicion of organising, publicising or taking part in several unauthorised assemblies between August and October 2019 in the course of the anti-extradition bill protests. Following protocol, the police statement did not disclose the names of the accused, however others arrested include veteran lawyers Martin Lee and Margaret Ng.

== See also ==
- Politics of Hong Kong
- List of political parties in Hong Kong
- List of Chinese pro-democracy activists
- 2019–20 Hong Kong protests
- List of University of Waterloo people

Party political offices
New political party	Convenor of the Frontier; 1996	Succeeded by Emily Lau
New political party	Chairman of Civic Act-up; 2003–2012	Merged into Labour Party
Legislative Council of Hong Kong
Preceded by Rita Fan	Member of Legislative Council; Representative for Hong Kong Island; 2008–2016	Seat abolished
