= Financing, Insurance, Real Estate and Business Services (constituency) =

Former Hong Kong functional constituency

Financing, Insurance, Real Estate and Business Services 金融、保險、地產及商業服務界
- Former Functional constituency for the Legislative Council of Hong Kong
- Electorate: 171,534

Former constituency
- Created: 1995
- Abolished: 1997
- Number of members: One
- Member: Andrew Cheng (Democratic)
- Replaced by: Insurance

The Financing, Insurance, Real Estate and Business Services functional constituency was in the elections for the Legislative Council of Hong Kong first created in 1995 as one of the nine new functional constituencies under the electoral reform carried out by the then Governor Chris Patten, in which the electorate consisted of total 171,534 eligible voters worked in the services sector related to finance, insurance, real estate and business in Hong Kong.

The constituency was abolished with the colonial Legislative Council dissolved after the transfer of the sovereignty in 1997.

A similar Insurance functional constituency was created for the 1998 election by the HKSAR government with a much narrow electorate base which restricted to only less than 200 insurers.

== Councillors represented ==
Election	Member	Party
1995	Andrew Cheng	Democratic
1997	Legislative Council dissolved	

== Election results ==
1995 Legislative Council election: Financing, Insurance, Real Estate and Business Services
Party	Candidate	Votes	%	±%
Democratic	Andrew Cheng Kar-foo	25,658	39.68	
DAB	Fung Chi-kin	18,674	28.88	
Independent	Chan Yuk-cheung	10,514	16.26	
Liberal	Chan Yim-kwong	5,771	8.92	
LDF	Ng Kam-chun	2,348	3.63	
Independent	Chan Tung-ngok	1,699	2.63	
Majority		6,984	10.80	
Total valid votes		64,664	100.00	
Rejected ballots		4,142		
Turnout		68,806	40.11	
Registered electors		171,534		
Democratic win (new seat)				
