= Kowloon West (1995 constituency) =

Geographical constituency

- Former Geographical constituency for the Legislative Council of Hong Kong
- Boundary of Kowloon West in Hong Kong
- District: Sham Shui Po District
- Region: Kowloon
- Electorate: 145,568

Former constituency
- Created: 1995
- Abolished: 1997
- Created from: Kowloon West
- Replaced by: Kowloon West

Kowloon West was a geographical constituencies in the election for the Legislative Council of Hong Kong in 1995, which elects one member of the Legislative Council using the first-past-the-post voting system. The constituency covers Sham Shui Po District in Kowloon.

The constituency was merged into the Kowloon West constituency in 1998 after the handover of Hong Kong a year before.

== Returned members ==
Elected members are as follows:

Election	Member	Party
1995	Frederick Fung	ADPL

== Election results ==
1995 Legislative Council election: Kowloon West
Party	Candidate	Votes	%	±%
ADPL	Frederick Fung Kin-kee	28,996	67.37	
Independent	Fu Shu-wan	12,264	28.50	
Independent	Wong Yin-ping	1,778	4.13	
Majority		16,732	38.87	
Total valid votes		43,038	100.00	
Rejected ballots		1,043		
Turnout		44,081	30.28	
Registered electors		145,568		
ADPL win (new seat)				
