= Hong Kong Island Central (1995 constituency) =

- Former Geographical constituency for the Legislative Council of Hong Kong
- Boundary of Hong Kong Island Central in Hong Kong
- District: Wan Chai District; Eastern District
- Region: Hong Kong Island
- Electorate: 119,771

Former constituency
- Created: 1995
- Abolished: 1997
- Created from: Hong Kong Island East
- Replaced by: Hong Kong Island

Hong Kong Island Central was a geographical constituencies in the election for the Legislative Council of Hong Kong in 1995, which elects one member of the Legislative Council using the first-past-the-post voting system. The constituency covers Wan Chai District and parts of Eastern District on Hong Kong Island.

The constituency was merged into the Hong Kong Island constituency in 1998 after the handover of Hong Kong a year before.

== Returned members ==
Elected members are as follows:

Election	Member	Party
1995	Christine Loh	Independent
1997	Christine Loh	Citizens

== Election results ==
1995 Legislative Council election: Hong Kong Island Central
Party	Candidate	Votes	%	±%
Independent	Christine Loh Kung-wai	27,199	65.33	
Independent	Peggy Lam Pei	14,437	34.67	
Majority		12,762	30.66	
Total valid votes		41,636	100.00	
Rejected ballots		271		
Turnout		41,907	34.99	
Registered electors		119,771		
Independent win (new seat)				
