= Kowloon Central (1995 constituency) =

Constituency in Hong Kong, 1995 to 1997

- Former Geographical constituency for the Legislative Council of Hong Kong
- Boundary of Kowloon Central in Hong Kong
- District: Kowloon City District; Wong Tai Sin District
- Region: Kowloon
- Electorate: 106,296

Former constituency
- Created: 1995
- Abolished: 1997
- Created from: Kowloon Central
- Replaced by: Kowloon East; Kowloon West

Kowloon Central was a geographical constituency in the election for the Legislative Council of Hong Kong in 1995, which elects one member of the Legislative Council using the first-past-the-post voting system. The constituency covers Kowloon City District and Wong Tai Sin District in Kowloon.

The constituency was divided and replaced by the Kowloon East and Kowloon West constituencies in 1998 after the handover of Hong Kong a year before.

== Returned members ==
Elected members are as follows:

Election	Member	Party
1995	Bruce Liu	ADPL

== Election results ==
1995 Legislative Council election: Kowloon Central
Party	Candidate	Votes	%	±%
ADPL	Liu Sing-lee	22,183	57.06	
DAB	Jasper Tsang Yok-sing	16,691	42.94	
Majority		5,492	14.08	
Total valid votes		38,874	100.00	
Rejected ballots		592		
Turnout		39,466	37.13	
Registered electors		106,296		
ADPL win (new seat)				
