= Hong Kong Island East (1995 constituency) =

- Former Geographical constituency for the Legislative Council of Hong Kong
- Boundary of Hong Kong Island East in Hong Kong
- District: Eastern District
- Region: Hong Kong Island
- Electorate: 144,468

Former constituency
- Created: 1995
- Abolished: 1997
- Created from: Hong Kong Island East
- Replaced by: Hong Kong Island

Hong Kong Island East was a geographical constituency in the election for the Legislative Council of Hong Kong in 1995, which elects one member of the Legislative Council using the first-past-the-post voting system. The constituency covers part of the Eastern District from east of North Point to west of Chai Wan.

The constituency was merged into the Hong Kong Island constituency in 1998 after the handover of Hong Kong a year before.

== Returned members ==
Elected members are as follows:

| Election | Member | Party |
|---|---|---|
| 1995 | Martin Lee | Democratic |

== Election results ==
1995 Legislative Council election: Hong Kong Island East
| Party | Candidate | Votes | % | ±% |
|---|---|---|---|---|
| Democratic | Martin Lee Chu-ming | 37,459 | 72.28 | |
| HKPA | Choy So-yuk | 14,119 | 27.37 | |
| Majority | | 23,340 | 44.91 | |
| Total valid votes | | 51,578 | 100.00 | |
| Rejected ballots | | 467 | | |
| Turnout | | 52,045 | 36.03 | |
| Registered electors | | 144,468 | | |
| Democratic win (new seat) | | | | |
