= 1995 Hong Kong legislative election =

Election held in Hong Kong

- 17 September 1995

All 60 seats to the Legislative Council 31 seats needed for a majority
- Registered: 2,572,124 (GC) ▲34.18%
- Turnout: 920,567 (35.80%) ▼3.35pp
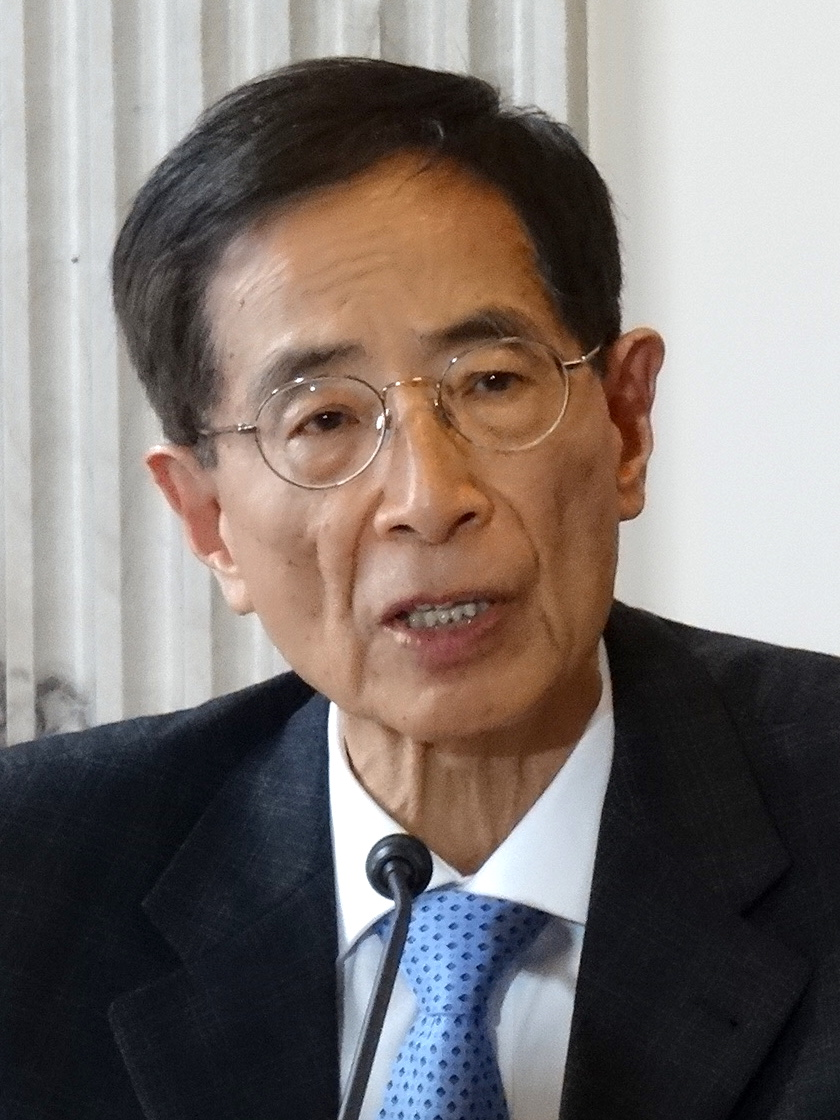

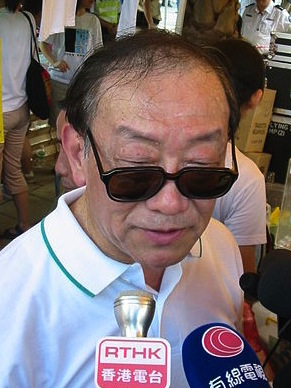

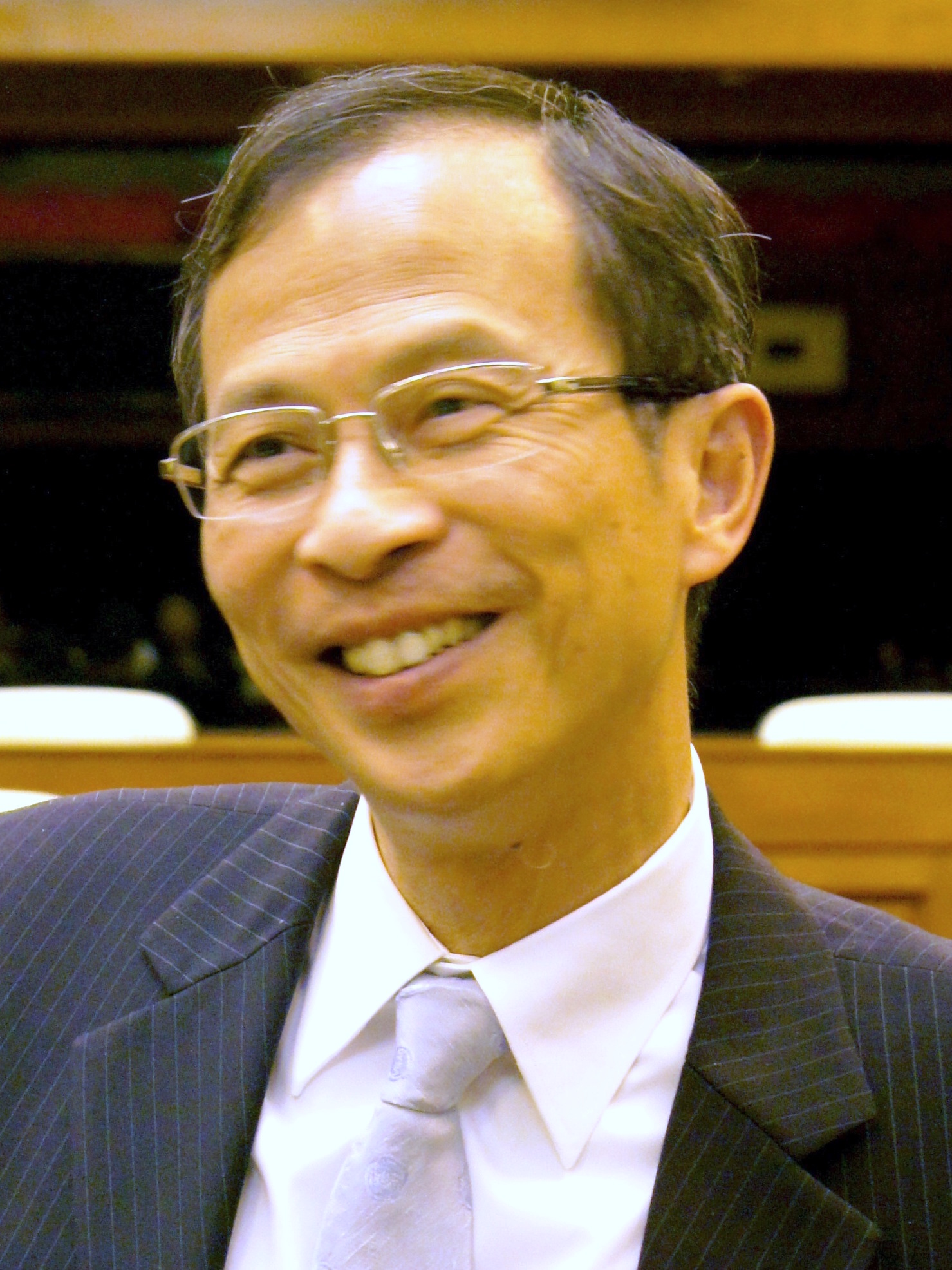

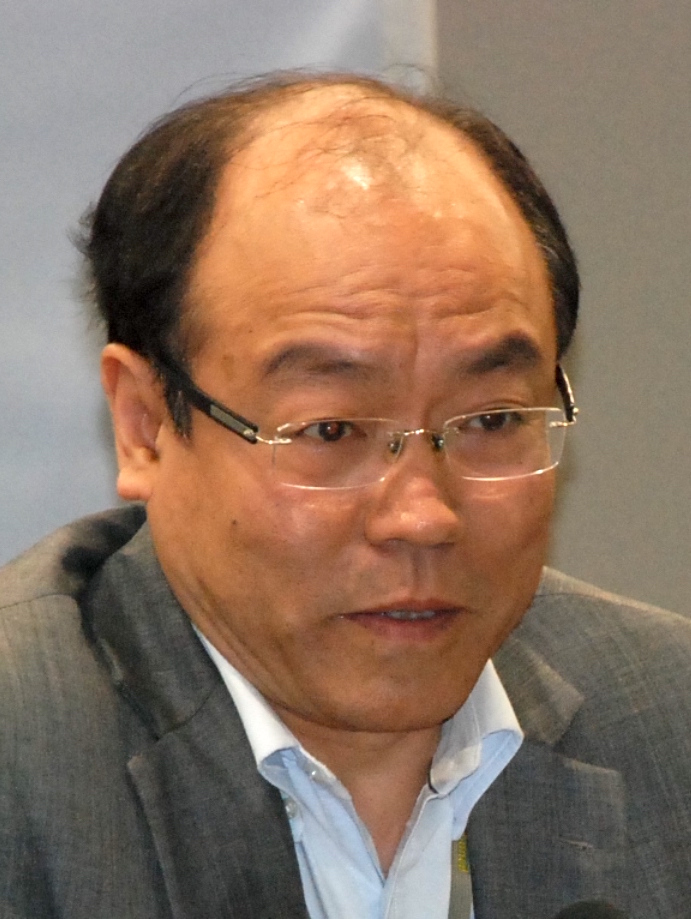
	First party	Second party	Third party
Leader	Martin Lee	Allen Lee	Jasper Tsang
Party	Democratic	Liberal	DAB
Alliance	Pan-democracy	Pro-Beijing	Pro-Beijing
Leader's seat	Hong Kong Island East	New Territories Northeast	Kowloon Central (defeated)
Last election	16 seats, 52.35%	New party	New party
Seats won	19	10	6
Seat change	▲4	▼5	▲5
Popular vote	385,428	15,126	142,801
Percentage	42.26%	1.64%	15.66%
	Fourth party	Fifth party	Sixth party
Leader	Frederick Fung	Ambrose Lau	Hu Fa-kuang
Party	ADPL	HKPA	LDF
Alliance	Pan-democracy	Pro-Beijing	Pro-Beijing
Leader's seat	Kowloon West	Election Committee	Did not stand
Last election	1 seat, 4.44%	New party	3 seats, 5.16%
Seats won	4	1	1
Seat change	▲3	▲1	Steady
Popular vote	87,072	25,964	11,572
Percentage	9.55%	2.85%	1.27%
Swing	▲5.11pp	N/A	▼3.99pp
- Elected candidates by each constituency
Party control before election
Liberals
Party control after election
Pro-democracy camp

The 1995 Hong Kong Legislative Council election for members of the Legislative Council of Hong Kong (LegCo) was held on 17 September 1995. It was the first, and only, fully elected legislative election in the colonial period before transferring Hong Kong's sovereignty to China two years later. The elections returned 20 members from directly elected geographical constituencies, 30 members from indirectly elected functional constituencies, and 10 members from elections committee constituency who were elected by all District Board members.

In consequence of Governor Chris Patten's constitutional reforms, which were strongly opposed by the Beijing government, the nine newly created functional constituencies enfranchised around 2.7 million new voters. As the tensions between Britain and China went on, Hong Kong became rapidly politicised. Party politics was getting in shape as the Beijing-loyalist Democratic Alliance for the Betterment of Hong Kong (DAB), the pro-business Liberal Party, the pro-democracy Democratic Party and the middle-class and professional oriented Hong Kong Progressive Alliance (HKPA) were set up and filled their candidates in the election.

The pro-democracy forces won another landslide victory after the 1991 Legislative Council elections, sweeping 16 of the 20 directly elected seats in which the Democratic Party alone took 12 directly elected seats. The Democrats returned to the legislature with a total number of 19 seats, far ahead of the Liberal Party's 10, the DAB 6 and the pro-democracy Association for Democracy and People's Livelihood's (ADPL) 4 seats. ADPL young candidate Bruce Liu also defeated DAB chairman Tsang Yok-sing in Kowloon Central, along with many other DAB main candidates being defeated by pro-democrats.

The pro-democrats controlled about half of the seats in the legislature and supported moderate Andrew Wong to become President of the Legislative Council. Since Beijing overthrew the promise of "through train" which guaranteed the legislature could travel through 1997 as the reaction to Chris Patten's reform, the legislature lasted for only 21 months and was replaced by the Beijing-controlled Provisional Legislative Council after the handover of Hong Kong, becoming the only pro-democracy legislature in history.

== Background ==
The electoral bases were largely expanded under the 1994 Hong Kong electoral reform carried out by the last colonial governor Chris Patten as the last step of democratisation as following:

- Using the "single seat, single constituency" method for all three tiers of geographical constituency elections to the District Boards, Municipal Councils (Urban and Regional Council) and Legislative Council;
- Lowering the minimum voting age from 21 to 18;
- Abolishing all appointed seats on the District Boards and Municipal Councils;
- Removing all the restrictions on local deletes to China's National People's Congress to stand for election;
- Broadening the franchise of certain existing functional constituencies by replacing corporate voting with individual voting;
- Introducing nine new functional constituency seats; and
- The introduction of an Election Committee of District Board members, which would return 10 members to the Legislative Council using the single transferable vote.

Nine new functional constituencies with much larger eligible electorates were created to broaden the franchise to 2.7 million new voters:

1. Primary Production, Power and Construction
2. Textiles and Garment
3. Manufacturing
4. Import and Export
5. Wholesale and Retail
6. Hotels and Catering
7. Transport and Communication
8. Financing, Insurance, Real Estate and Business Services
9. Community, Social and Personal Services

== Overview ==
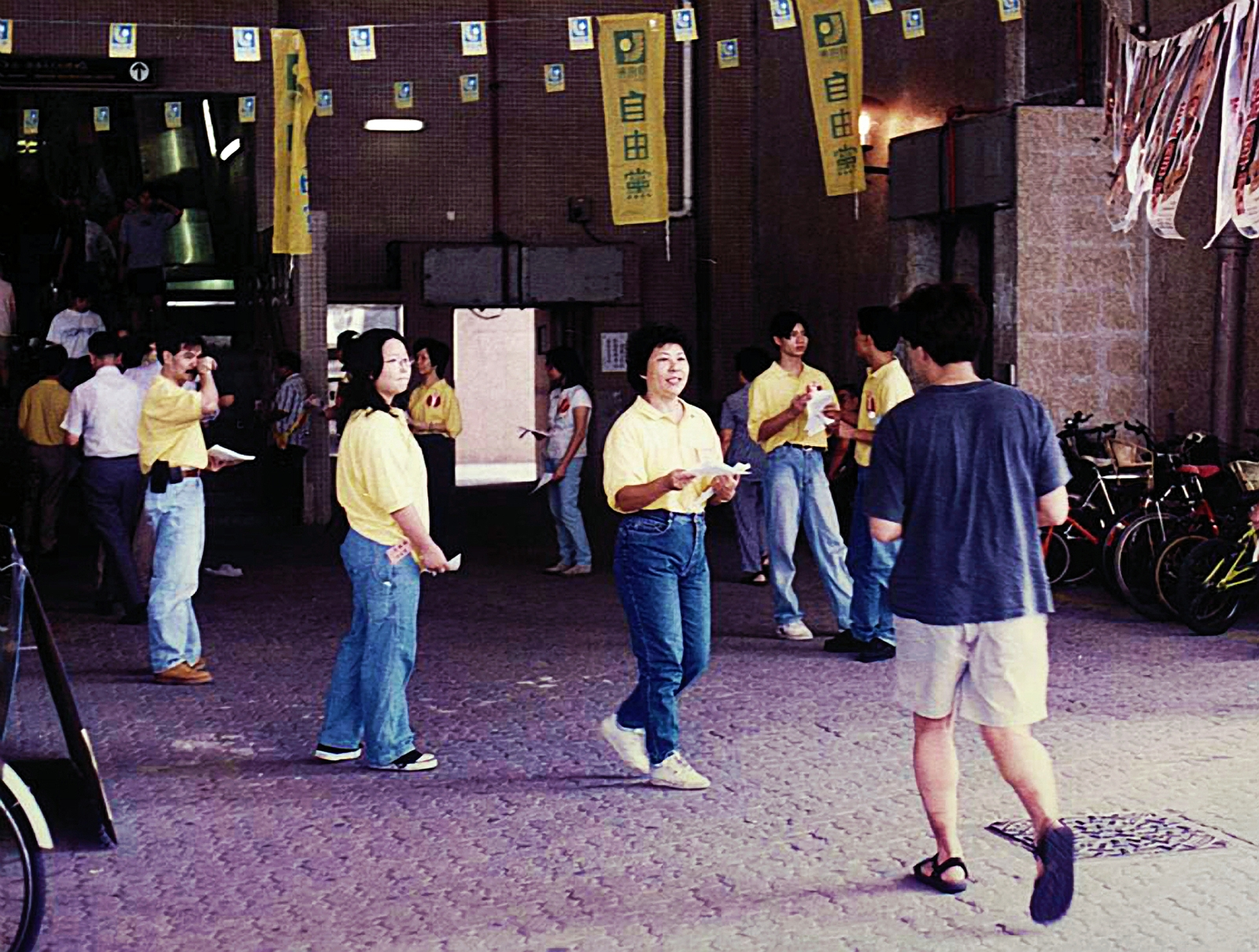
Election campaigning by Liberal Party volunteers

The United Democrats of Hong Kong and the Meeting Point, the two major pro-democracy forces had merged into the Democratic Party in 1994, while the pro-business legislators had formed the Liberal Party in 1993 and the pro-Chinese government politicians established the Democratic Alliance for the Betterment of Hong Kong (DAB), today's largest political party.

Solicitor Ambrose Lau, in the direction of the New China News Agency founded the Hong Kong Progressive Alliance which consisted of mostly pro-business factor of the CCP's united front. Other grassroots leaders were also encouraged by the CCP to stand in the election against the pro-democracy camp.

Succeeding the last election in 1991, Democratic Party, together with other smaller parties, groups and independents in the pro-democracy camp, had another landslide victory again, getting 16 of the 20 geographical constituency seats. Allen Lee, the Chairman of the Liberal Party and the Appointed Member in the LegCo got elected in the geographical constituency direct election. The Chairman of the DAB, Tsang Yok-sing however got defeated by Bruce Liu of pro-democracy Association for Democracy and People's Livelihood in Kowloon Central.

The Government of the People's Republic of China overthrew the promise of the "through train" (letting the members elected in the 1995 election travel safely through 1997 and beyond) and set up the Provisional Legislative Council in 1996, after the proposal package of electoral changes for the 1995 Legislative Council elections that was deemed unconstitutional by the PRC was passed in the Legislative Council.

== General outcome ==
Overall Summary of the 7 September 1995 Legislative Council of Hong Kong election results
Political Affiliation	Geographical constituencies			Functional constituencies			Election Committee seats	Total seats
Political Affiliation	Votes	%	Seats	Votes	%	Seats	Election Committee seats	Total seats
Democratic Party	385,428	42.26	12	62,907	14.47	5	2	19
Hong Kong Association for Democracy and People's Livelihood	87,072	9.55	2	−	−	1	1	4
Hong Kong Confederation of Trade Unions	−	−	−	42,565	9.79	1	−	1
United Ants	18,551	2.03	0	−	−	−	−	0
Democratic Labour Alliance	−	−	−	33,596	7.73	0	−	0
Independent and others	66,464	7.29	2	60,602	13.94	3	0	5
Total for pro-democracy camp	557,515	61.13	16	199,670	45.93	10	3	29
Liberal Party	15,216	1.67	1	74,355	17.10	9	0	10
Democratic Alliance for the Betterment of Hong Kong	142,801	15.66	2	42,767	9.84	2	2	6
Hong Kong Progressive Alliance	25,964	2.85	0	–	–	–	1	1
Liberal Democratic Federation of Hong Kong	11,572	1.27	0	4,986	1.15	0	1	1
Hong Kong Federation of Trade Unions	−	−	−	21,836	5.02	1	−	1
New Hong Kong Alliance	−	−	−	−	−	1	−	1
Independent and others	90,495	9.92	0	64,499	14.84	4	1	5
Total for pro-Beijing parties	286,048	31.37	3	208,443	41.34	16	5	24
Federation of Hong Kong and Kowloon Labour Unions	−	−	−	533	0.12	1	−	1
123 Democratic Alliance	−	−	−	−	−	−	1	1
Civil Force	27,841	3.05	0	–	–	–	0	0
Hong Kong Alliance of Chinese and Expatriates	3,979	0.44	0	−	−	−	−	0
Pioneer	2,594	0.28	0	−	−	−	−	0
Hong Kong and Kowloon Trades Union Council	−	−	−	262	0.06	0	−	0
Non-affiliated Independent and others	33,974	3.73	1	25,798	5.93	3	1	5
Total (turnout 35.80%)	911,951	100.00	20	434,706	100.00	30	10	60

=== Vote summary ===
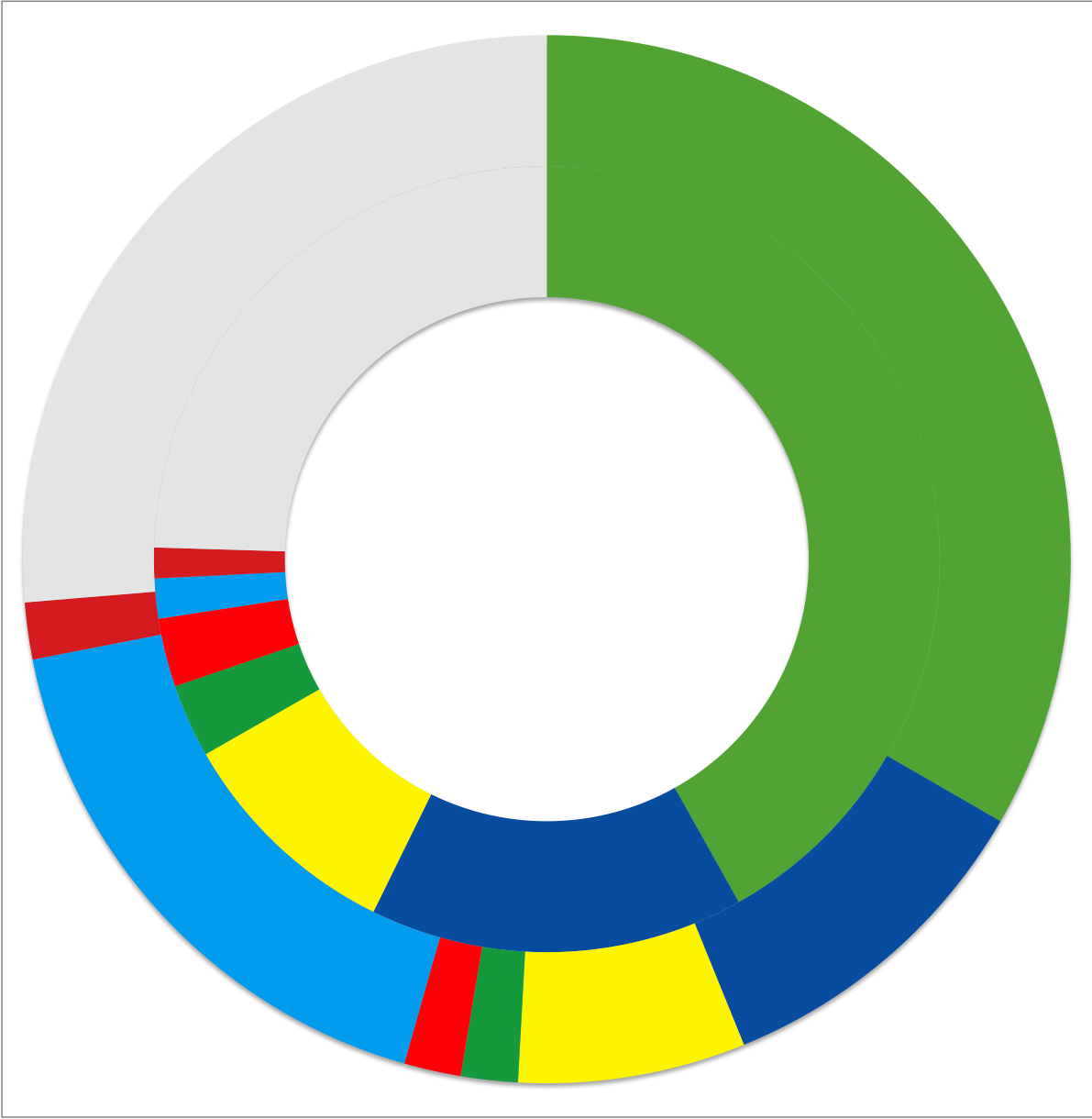
Ring charts of the election results showing popular vote against seats won, coloured in party colours. Seats won in the election (outer ring) against number of votes (inner ring).

Popular vote
Democratic	42.26%
DAB	15.66%
ADPL	9.55%
Civil Force	3.05%
PA	2.85%
United Ants	2.03%
Liberal	1.64%
LDF	1.27%
ACE	0.44%
Pioneer	0.28%
Independents	22.95%

=== Seat summary ===
Seats
Democratic	31.67%
Liberal	16.67%
DAB	10.00%
ADPL	6.67%
PA	1.67%
LDF	1.67%
CTU	1.67%
FTU	1.67%
FLU	1.67%
NHKA	1.67%
Independents	25.00%

== Result breakdown ==
=== Geographical Constituencies ===
Constituency	Candidates	Affiliation	Votes	%
LC1 Hong Kong Island Central	1 Peggy Lam Pei	Independent	14,437	34.67
LC1 Hong Kong Island Central	2 Christine Loh Kung-wai	Independent	27,199	65.33
LC2 Hong Kong Island East	1 Choy So-yuk	HKPA	14,119	27.37
LC2 Hong Kong Island East	2 Martin Lee Chu-ming	Democratic	37,459	72.28
LC3 Hong Kong Island South	1 Cheng Kai-nam	DAB	29,910	47.64
LC3 Hong Kong Island South	2 Yeung Sum	Democratic	32,875	52.36
LC4 Hong Kong Island West	1 Huang Chen-ya	Democratic	31,156	66.32
LC4 Hong Kong Island West	2 Guy Lam Kwok-hung	ACE	3,979	8.47
LC4 Hong Kong Island West	3 Lam Kin-lai	HKPA	11,845	25.21
LC5 Kowloon Central	1 Jasper Tsang Yok-sing	DAB	16,691	42.94
LC5 Kowloon Central	2 Liu Sing-lee	ADPL	22,183	57.06
LC6 Kowloon North-east	1 Mak Hoi-wah	Democratic	23,201	47.23
LC6 Kowloon North-east	2 Chan Yuen-han	DAB/FTU	25,922	52.77
LC7 Kowloon East	1 Elsie Tu	Independent	23,855	44.60
LC7 Kowloon East	2 Szeto Wah	Democratic	29,627	55.40
LC8 Kowloon South-east	1 Tam Yiu-chung	DAB/FTU	29,009	49.05
LC8 Kowloon South-east	2 Li Wah-ming	Democratic	30,133	50.95
LC9 Kowloon South	1 Lau Chin-shek	Democratic/CTU	26,827	69.86
LC9 Kowloon South	2 Wong Siu-yee	LDF	11,572	30.14
LC10 Kowloon South-west	1 Helen Chung Yee-fong	Independent	1,482	5.53
LC10 Kowloon South-west	2 James To Kun-sun	Democratic	17,731	66.17
LC10 Kowloon South-west	3 Kingsley Sit Ho-yin	Independent	2,656	9.91
LC10 Kowloon South-west	4 Daniel Wong Kwok-tung	ADPL	4,929	18.39
LC11 Kowloon West	1 Wong Yin-ping	Independent	1,778	4.13
LC11 Kowloon West	2 Frederick Fung Kin-kee	ADPL	28,996	67.37
LC11 Kowloon West	3 Fu Shu-wan	Independent	12,264	28.50
LC12 New Territories Central	1 Albert Chan Wai-yip	Democratic	25,303	74.79
LC12 New Territories Central	2 Ng Wai-kwong	Independent	4,097	12.11
LC12 New Territories Central	3 Tam Tai-on	Independent	4,433	13.10
LC13 New Territories North-west	1 Zachary Wong Wai-yin	Democratic	21,527	50.07
LC13 New Territories North-west	2 Tang Siu-tong	Independent	21,470	49.93
LC14 New Territories North	1 Cheung Hon-chung	DAB	17,026	50.07
LC14 New Territories North	2 Wong Sing-chi	Democratic	16,978	49.93
LC15 New Territories North-east	1 Allen Lee Peng-fei	Liberal	15,216	34.82
LC15 New Territories North-east	2 Law Yuk-kai	United Ants	4,723	10.81
LC15 New Territories North-east	3 Cheung Hok-ming	DAB	12,256	28.04
LC15 New Territories North-east	4 Cheung Wing-fai	Democratic	11,507	26.33
LC16 New Territories South-east	1 Andrew Wong Wang-fat	Independent	23,666	47.83
LC16 New Territories South-east	2 William Wan Hon-cheung	DAB	11,987	24.23
LC16 New Territories South-east	3 Harold Ko Ping-chung	United Ants	13,828	27.95
LC17 New Territories East	1 Lau Kong-wah	Civil Force	27,841	41.49
LC17 New Territories East	2 Emily Lau Wai-hing	Independent	39,265	58.51
LC18 New Territories South	1 Hui Chiu-fai	Independent	8,179	22.21
LC18 New Territories South	2 Sin Chung-kai	Democratic	26,048	70.74
LC18 New Territories South	3 Lam Chi-leung	Pioneer	2,594	7.05
LC19 New Territories South-west	1 Lee Wing-tat	Democratic	29,801	65.35
LC19 New Territories South-west	2 Ting Yin-wah	ADPL	15,798	34.65
LC20 New Territories West	1 Chan Wan-sang	Independent (NTWRA)	6,152	13.21
LC20 New Territories West	2 Ho Chun-yan	Democratic	25,255	54.23
LC20 New Territories West	3 Yim Tin-sang	ADPL	15,166	32.56

=== Functional Constituencies ===
Constituency	Candidates	Affiliation	Votes	%
A Primary Production, Power and Construction	11 Tsang Kin-shing	Democratic	11,592	40.93
A Primary Production, Power and Construction	12 Ho Sai-chu	Independent	5,366	18.95
A Primary Production, Power and Construction	13 Poon To-chuen	DAB	7,493	26.46
A Primary Production, Power and Construction	14 Tong Yat-chu	Independent (NHKA)	3,871	13.67
B Textiles and Garments	21 Cheng Ming-kit	LDF	2,638	12.45
B Textiles and Garments	22 Leung Yiu-chung	Independent (NWSC)	10,472	49.44
B Textiles and Garments	23 Ng Ching-man	Independent (KCO)	2,957	13.96
B Textiles and Garments	24 Chan Kwok-keung	Independent (FTU)	5,116	24.15
C Manufacturing	31 Chan Ming-yiu	Independent	4,931	11.21
C Manufacturing	32 Lee Cheuk-yan	CTU/DLA	30,510	69.38
C Manufacturing	33 Leung Fu-wah	FTU	8,535	19.41
D Import and Export	41 Henry Tang Ying-yen	Liberal	24,997	61.67
D Import and Export	42 Kwan Lim-ho	Independent (PAS)	15,539	38.33
E Wholesale and Retail	51 Selina Chow Liang Shuk-yee	Liberal	23,357	68.05
E Wholesale and Retail	52 Wong Kwok-hing	DAB	10,965	31.95
F Hotels and Catering	61 Chiang Sai-cheong	Independent (KCO)	5,176	28.48
F Hotels and Catering	62 Li Hon-shing	Independent	3,393	18.67
F Hotels and Catering	63 Chan Wing-chan	DAB	5,614	30.89
F Hotels and Catering	64 Tommy Cheung Yu-yan	Liberal	3,991	21.96
G Transport and Communication	71 Cheng Kai-ming	Independent	2,324	5.37
G Transport and Communication	72 Miriam Lau Kin-yee	Liberal	14,233	32.89
G Transport and Communication	73 Ip Kwok-fun	CTU	12,055	27.86
G Transport and Communication	74 Cheuk Siu-yee	FTU	12,617	29.16
G Transport and Communication	75 Cheung Pak-chi	Independent	2,042	4.72
H Financing, Insurance, Real; Estate and Business Services	81 Ng Kam-chun	LDF	2,348	3.63
H Financing, Insurance, Real; Estate and Business Services	82 Andrew Cheng Kar-foo	Democratic	25,658	39.68
H Financing, Insurance, Real; Estate and Business Services	83 Chan Yuk-cheung	Independent	10,514	16.26
H Financing, Insurance, Real; Estate and Business Services	84 Chan Yim-kwong	Liberal	5,771	8.92
H Financing, Insurance, Real; Estate and Business Services	85 Tony Chan Tung-ngok	Independent	1,699	2.63
H Financing, Insurance, Real; Estate and Business Services	86 Fung Chi-kin	DAB	18,674	28.88
I Community, Social and Personal Services	91 Elizabeth Wong Chien Chi-lien	Independent	40,649	41.75
I Community, Social and Personal Services	92 Kwok Yuen-hon	Independent	14,452	14.84
I Community, Social and Personal Services	93 Brian Kan Ping-chee	Independent	6,290	6.46
I Community, Social and Personal Services	94 Michael Siu Yin-ying	DLA	33,596	34.50
I Community, Social and Personal Services	95 Fan Kwok-wah	Independent	2,386	2.45
J Commercial (First)	201 Paul Cheng Ming-fun	Independent	Uncontested	
K Commercial (Second)	211 Philip Wong Yu-hong	NHKA	Uncontested	
L Industrial (First)	221 James Tien Pei-chun	Liberal	Uncontested	
M Industrial (Second)	231 Ngai Shiu-kit	Liberal	Uncontested	
N Finance	241 David Li Kwok-po	Independent	Uncontested	
O Labour (2 seats)	251 Lee Kai-ming	FLU	533	33.56
O Labour (2 seats)	252 Cheng Yiu-tong	FTU	684	43.07
O Labour (2 seats)	253 John Luk Woon-cheung	Independent	109	6.86
O Labour (2 seats)	254 Lee Kwok-keung	TUC	262	16.50
P Social Welfare	261 Law Chi-kwong	Democratic	1,115	64.08
P Social Welfare	262 Chow Wing-sun	Independent	625	35.92
Q Tourism	271 Hau Suk-kei	Independent	175	29.76
Q Tourism	272 Howard Young	Liberal	413	70.24
R Real Estate and Construction	281 Ronald Joseph Arculli	Liberal	Uncontested	
S Financial Services	291 Chen Po-sum	Independent	243	40.10
S Financial Services	292 Chim Pui-chung	Independent	363	59.90
T Medical	301 Cecilia Young Yau-yau	Independent	135	5.39
T Medical	302 Edward Leong Che-hung	Independent	2,371	94.61
U Education	311 Leung Siu-tong	Independent	4,496	18.69
U Education	312 Cheung Man-kwong	Democratic	19,558	81.31
V Legal	321 Margaret Ng	Independent	723	54.52
V Legal	322 Alfred Donald Yap	Independent	444	33.48
V Legal	323 Li Wai-ip	Independent	159	11.99
W Engineering	331 Samuel Wong Ping-wai	Independent	1,382	62.70
W Engineering	332 Raymond Ho Chung-tai	Independent	822	37.30
X Health Services	341 Alice Pong Tso Shing-yuk	Liberal	1,116	18.34
X Health Services	342 Michael Ho Mun-ka	Democratic	4,968	81.66
Y Accountancy	351 Edward Chow Kwong-fai	Liberal	477	22.17
Y Accountancy	352 Eric Li Ka-cheung	Independent	1,376	63.94
Y Accountancy	353 Peter Chan Po-fun	Independent	299	13.89
Z Architectural, Surveying and Planning	361 Edward Ho Sing-tin	Liberal	Uncontested	
Urban Council	1 Mok Ying-fan	ADPL	Uncontested	
Regional Council	1 Alan Tam King-wah	Democratic	16	43.24
Regional Council	2 Ngan Kam-chuen	DAB	21	56.16
Rural	1 Lau Wong-fat	Independent (Liberal)	Uncontested	

=== Election Committee Constituency ===
Candidates	Affiliation	Value of votes
1 Yeung Fuk-kwong	Independent (UFSP)	0
2 Lee York-fai	Independent	0
3 Fung Kwong-chung	Independent	0
4 Lo Suk-ching	Independent	26
5 Choy Kan-pui	Independent (CF)	26
6 Cheung Bing-leung	Democratic	26
7 Lau Hon-chuen	HKPA	26
8 Chan Kam-lam	DAB	26
9 Leung Kwong-cheong	ADPL	0
10 Law Cheung-kwok	ADPL	26
11 Ip Kwok-him	DAB	26
12 John Tse Wing-ling	Democratic	26
13 David Chu Yu-lin	LDF	26
14 Yuen Bun-keung	Democratic	0
15 Mark Lin	Liberal	0
16 Louis Leung Wing-on	Independent	0
17 Yum Sin-ling	123DA	26
18 Paul Chan Sing-kong	Independent	0
