= Elizabeth Wong (author) =

Fiction writer and retired official

Elizabeth Wong CBE ISO JP

Member of the Legislative Council
- In office 17 September 1995 – 30 June 1997
- Constituency: Public, Social and Personal Services
- Majority: 45.75%

Secretary of the Hygiene and Welfare Bureau
- In office 1990–1994
- Preceded by: Chow Tak-hei
- Succeeded by: Fok Law Siu-ching

Director of the Social Welfare Department
- In office 1987–1990
- Preceded by: Anson Chan
- Succeeded by: Michael David Cartland

Personal details
- Born: 1937 (age 88–89) Shanghai, Republic of China
- Education: University of Hong Kong (B.A. in English Literature)
- Occupation: Retired official, former teacher at St. Paul's Co-educational College

Elizabeth "Libby" Wong Chien Chi-lien CBE ISO JP (Chinese: 黃錢其濂; née Chien) is a former civil servant and politician from Hong Kong, born in Shanghai, China. Wong is an alumna of Diocesan Girls' Junior School and Diocesan Girls' School. She holds New Zealand citizenship, and is currently residing in Sydney. She is now a popular fiction writer. Her novels in English and Chinese are Rainbow City and its sequel Flower Mountain. Elizabeth's husband is third generation Chinese New Zealanders, Elizabeth settled in Australia some years ago.

Wong served in the Hong Kong Government as the Director of Social Welfare from March 1987 to February 1990, and Secretary for Health and Welfare from February 1990 to 1994. She was a member of the Legislative Council from 1995 to 1997. In 1997, she quit politics to write.

Legislative Council of Hong Kong
New seat	Member of Legislative Council; Representative for Public, Social and Personal Services constituency 1995–1997	Replaced by Provisional Legislative Council
