= The Frontier (Hong Kong) =

The Frontier 前綫
- Founder: Emily Lau
- Founded: 26 August 1996; 30 years ago
- Dissolved: 23 November 2008; 17 years ago
- Merged into: Democratic Party
- Succeeded by: The Frontier (2010)
- Ideology: Direct democracy Environmentalism; Social democracy Social liberalism
- Political position: Centre-left
- Regional affiliation: Pan-democracy camp
- Colours: Yellow

The Frontier was a pro-democracy political group in Hong Kong. It was founded on 26 August 1996 by a group of Legislative Council members and democratic activists headed by Convenor Emily Lau. It was merged into the Democratic Party, the pro-democracy flagship party on 23 November 2008. A new party bearing the same name was established in 2010 by former members who opposed the previous Frontier joining the Democratic Party.

== Beliefs ==
Among the pro-democratic parties, the Frontier took a relatively radical political agenda than the Democratic Party. Besides upholding human rights, rule of law and fighting for universal suffrage, it called for a new constitution drafted by the Hong Kong people to replace the Hong Kong Basic Law, which led to a direct confrontation to the PRC central government. For its continuing challenge to the central and SAR governments, it was described as a "head-bander" party.

The group had a left wing position on economic matters, with both membership and legislators except Emily Lau heavily involved in labour and worker activities.

== History ==
The Frontier was officially launched on 26 August 1996 by one of Hong Kong's most popular pro-democracy figures, Emily Lau. The founding members included her colleagues in the Legislative Council, Lee Cheuk-yan and Lau Chin-shek from the Hong Kong Confederation of Trade Unions (CTU), Leung Yiu-chung from the Neighbourhood and Workers Service Centre (NWSC) and Independent Elizabeth Wong, as well as about 100 professionals, students and unionists. It had five seats in the last days in the colonial legislature, making it the second-largest pro-democracy group after the Democratic Party. The Frontier did not regard itself as a political party, but rather as an alliance for "democracy, human rights and the rule of law" in Hong Kong.

In the 1998 LegCo elections, the Frontier won total of three seats, excluding Lau Chin-shek who ran as Democratic Party candidate and Leung Yiu-chung ran as Independent, gaining about 10% of the popular votes just behind the pro-democracy flagship party Democratic Party and pro-Beijing flagship party Democratic Alliance for the Betterment of Hong Kong (DAB). Emily Lau and Cyd Ho were elected with the highest votes in the New Territories East.

Although Emily Lau, Cyd Ho and Lee Cheuk-yan were re-elected in the 2000 LegCo elections, Lee Cheuk-yan began to run under the banner of the CTU. which made the Frontier's seat in the legislature reduce to two.

In April 2002, a number of radical "Young Turks" faction of the Democratic Party including Andrew To who had earlier formed a group called the Social Democratic Forum (SDF), split from the Democrats to join the Frontier.

In the 2004 LegCo elections, the Frontier won only one seat in the LegCo, occupied by Emily Lau, after Cyd Ho lost in the Hong Kong Island. This was believed to be caused by a tactical mistake by the Democratic Party to absorb too many votes from Cyd Ho which led to the defeat of Ho to DAB's Choy So-yuk.

On 23 November 2008 after the LegCo elections, the Frontier declared to merge with the Democratic Party, but the motion to have it disbanded failed to meet the required support level of 80%. A new party bearing the same name was established on 9 September 2010 by former members who opposed the previous Frontier joining the Democratic Party. Yang Sun-kong, the former Secretary General of the Frontier became the Convenor of the new group which is now part of the radical pro-democracy People Power. Emily Lau became the Vice-Chairwoman of the Democratic Party and was subsequently elected as the party's Chairwoman in 2012 leadership election.

== Electoral performance ==
=== Legislative Council elections ===
Election	Number of popular votes	% of popular votes	GC seats	FC seats	EC seats	Total seats	+/−	Position
1998	148,507	10.03	3	0	0	3 / 60	—N/a	5th
2000	89,529▼	6.70▼	2	0	0	2 / 60	2▼	5th
2004	121,900▲	6.89▲	1	0		1 / 60	1▼	6th▼
2008	33,205▼	2.19▼	1	0		1 / 60	0	10th▼

=== District Council elections ===
Election	Number of popular votes	% of popular votes	Total elected seats	+/−
1999	9,388	1.16	4 / 390	1▲
2003	25,349▲	2.41▼	6 / 400	1▲
2007	18,203▼	1.60▼	3 / 405	2▼
