= Democratic Alliance for the Betterment and Progress of Hong Kong =

Political party in Hong Kong

Democratic Alliance for the Betterment and Progress of Hong Kong 民主建港協進聯盟
- Abbreviation: DAB
- Chairperson: Gary Chan
- Vice-Chairpersons: Chan Yung; Ben Chan; Holden Chow; Chan Hok-Fung; Elizabeth Quat
- Founded: 10 July 1992; 34 years ago
- Merger of: Democratic Alliance for the Betterment of Hong Kong and Hong Kong Progressive Alliance
- Headquarters: 15/F, SUP Tower, 83 King's Road, North Point, Hong Kong
- Youth wing: Young DAB
- Membership (2020): ▲44,663
- Ideology: Chinese nationalism; Conservatism (HK); Social conservatism
- Political position: Centre-right to right-wing
- Local affiliation: Pro-Beijing camp
- Colours: Blue and red
- Slogan: Faithful to Hong Kong
- Executive Council: 4 / 33
- Legislative Council: 20 / 90
- District Councils: 147 / 470
- NPC (HK deputies): 7 / 36
- CPPCC (HK members): 16 / 124

Website
- dab.org.hk

Democratic Alliance for the Betterment and Progress of Hong Kong
- Traditional Chinese: 民主建港協進聯盟
- Simplified Chinese: 民主建港协进联盟
Transcriptions
Standard Mandarin
- Hanyu Pinyin: Mínzhǔ Jiàngǎng Xiéjìn Liánméng
- Wade–Giles: Min^{2}-chu^{3} Chien^{4}-kang^{3} Hsieh^{2}-chin^{4} Lien^{2}-mêng^{2}
Yue: Cantonese
- Yale Romanization: Màhnjyú Gin-góng Hihpjeun Lyùhnmàhng

Democratic Alliance for the Betterment of Hong Kong
- Traditional Chinese: 民主建港聯盟
- Simplified Chinese: 民主建港联盟
Transcriptions
Standard Mandarin
- Hanyu Pinyin: Mínzhǔ Jiàngǎng Liánméng
- Wade–Giles: Min^{2}-chu^{3} Chien^{4}-kang^{3} Lien^{2}-mêng^{2}
Yue: Cantonese
- Yale Romanization: Màhnjyú Gin-góng Lyùhnmàhng

Abbreviation
- Traditional Chinese: 民建聯
- Simplified Chinese: 民建联
Transcriptions
Standard Mandarin
- Hanyu Pinyin: Mínjiànlián
- Wade–Giles: Min^{2}-chien^{4}-lien^{2}
Yue: Cantonese
- Yale Romanization: Màhn-ginlyùhn

The Democratic Alliance for the Betterment and Progress of Hong Kong (DAB) is a pro-Beijing political party registered since 1992 in Hong Kong. Chaired by Gary Chan and holding 19 Legislative Council seats, it is currently the largest party in the legislature, far ahead of other parties. It has been a key supporting force to the SAR administration and the central government's policies on Hong Kong.

The party was established in 1992 as the "Democratic Alliance for the Betterment of Hong Kong" by a group of traditional Beijing loyalists who pledged allegiance to the Chinese Communist Party. As the transfer of sovereignty over Hong Kong was approaching, the party actively participated in elections in the last years of the colonial rule and became a major party and the ally to the government in the early post-handover era.

The DAB took a major blow in the 2003 District Council election due to the unpopular Tung Chee-hwa administration and the proposed legislation of the Article 23 of the Basic Law. However, the party still managed to recover its loss in the following decades, further expanded its electoral base and membership and absorbed the pro-business Hong Kong Progressive Alliance in 2005, becoming the a dominant force in Hong Kong politics.

The party received electoral successes in the 2007 and 2011 District Council elections, winning 136 local elected offices at its peak, and won 13 seats in the 2012 Legislative Council election thanks to its effective electoral strategy. In the 2019 District Council elections, however, the party received a significant loss of four-fifth of its seats the midst of the widespread anti-government protests.

== History ==
=== Founding and the reunification (1992–1998) ===
The Democratic Alliance for the Betterment of Hong Kong was founded as part of a wave of political party formations as Hong Kong approached its handover to China and amid electoral reform initiated by Governor Chris Patten. The 1991 Legislative Council election, which saw the defeat of all pro-Beijing candidates, was a catalyst to the forming of the DAB. In January 1992, director of the Hong Kong and Macau Affairs Office Lu Ping publicly encouraged the organisation of pro-Beijing political parties for the 1995 elections. Politicians from the Hong Kong Federation of Trade Unions (FTU) and other pro-Beijing organisations including the Hong Kong Federation of Education Workers (FEW) formed the DAB on 10 July 1992, with Tsang Yok-sing as the party's first chairperson. The DAB was the first major pro-Beijing party as a part of the "United Front" on the eve of the handover of Hong Kong.

Compared with other pro-Beijing parties in Hong Kong, the DAB was more grassroots-oriented. The 56 founding members of the DAB held political views that were sympathetic towards China and emphasised friendly Sino-Hong Kong relations. At the time of founding, many of them held political positions associated with the Chinese government or pro-Beijing groups in Hong Kong. Chairman Tsang Yok-sing was a delegate to Guangdong Province People's Political Consultative Conference, vice-chairman Tam Yiu-chung and Chan Yuen-han were executive members of the pro-Beijing trade union FTU, and secretary Cheng Kai-nam was appointed by the Chinese government as the Hong Kong Affairs Advisor. Political scientist Sonny Lo Shiu-hing notes that early DAB members are also "pro-Hong Kong" in the sense that they advocate for the interests of Hong Kong and lobby Chinese officials.

The DAB became the direct rival to the major pro-democracy party United Democrats of Hong Kong and its successor Democratic Party, which was formed in 1994. The DAB first fielded a candidate in the 1993 Regional Council by-election and lost. In the following year, the DAB participated in the 1994 District Board elections, where 37 of its 83 candidates were elected. In 1995, it participated in the municipal elections, winning eight directly elected and two indirectly elected seats. Major leaders of the DAB participated in the 1995 Legislative Council election. It was regarded as test cases of the popularity of the new party. Three of the four party leaders were defeated by pro-democracy candidates in the election, including party chairman Tsang Yok-sing who lost to Liu Sing-lee of the Association for Democracy and People's Livelihood (ADPL) in the Kowloon Central constituency.

The DAB took part in the preparation for establishing the Special Administrative Region on the eve of the handover of Hong Kong. In January 1996, Tsang Yok-sing, Tam Yiu-chung, Ng Hong-mun and Lee Cho-jat were appointed to the Preparatory Committee. It had 46 members elected to the Beijing-controlled Selection Committee in November 1996. In the following month, the Selection Committee elected 10 DAB members to the Provisional Legislative Council (PLC). The DAB and the Hong Kong Progressive Alliance (HKPA), another pro-Beijing party, allied with each other in the crucial Provisional Legislative Council debate on the substantial arrangements for the 1998 LegCo elections. This move was tacitly endorsed by the Heung Yee Kuk, and heralded as the unofficial merger of the parties. The Provisional Legislative Council, which was controlled by the pro-Beijing camp, vetoed the democratic reform introduced by the last British governor Chris Patten and replaced the first-past-the-post with the proportional representation method in the Legislative Council elections, so that the weaker DAB would be able to exploit the benefit of the proportional representation by taking a seat in every geographical constituency without having a majority of the votes. After the SAR was established, Tam Yiu-chung and was also appointed to the Executive Council by Chief Executive Tung Chee-hwa as the representative of the party.

=== Early Tung Chee-hwa administration and Article 23 setback (1998–2003) ===
Previous version of the DAB logo from 1992 to 2005.

The DAB's electoral campaigns have been largely assisted by Beijing and its united front organs. The Liaison Office would mobilise various social groups and organisations to campaign for and to vote for the party, including employees of PRC state-owned companies and grassroots organisations such as the New Territories Association of Societies (NTAS) and the Kowloon Federation of Associations (KFA). The DAB's sister organisation FTU also mobilised its workers to campaign for the DAB members. The FTU also sent a recommendation letter to its four hundred thousand members to seek support for DAB candidates.

In the 1998 LegCo election, the DAB took five directly elected seats with a quarter of the popular vote, compared to only two seats with 15% of the votes in the 1995 elections. According to Karl Ho, the change from a candidate-based system to an electoral list proportional representation system benefitted the DAB.

In December 1998, the party's 5th Central Committee decided to increase a Vice-Chairmanship, Ip Kwok-him and Cheng Kai-nam were subsequently elected as vice-chairmen. In the first District Council elections in November 1999, the party filled in 176 candidates, 83 of which were elected, more than double compared to the 1994 elections.

In the second SAR LegCo elections in September 2000, despite the conflict of interests scandal of Cheng Kai-nam, the DAB became a clear winner, capturing 11 seats in total, 7 in geographical constituency direct elections, 3 in functional constituencies and 1 Election Committee constituency. Although Cheng Kai-nam was elected, he soon resigned his party posts and LegCo seat under public pressure. After DAB candidate Christopher Chung Shu-kun losing to pro-democracy Independent Audrey Eu in the 10 December Hong Kong Island by-election, the DAB commanded 10 LegCo seats by the end of 2000.

In July 2002 the beginning of the second term of Tung Chee-hwa's administration, Chairman Tsang Yok-sing was appointed to the Executive Council under the Principal Officials Accountability System (POAS), succeeding Tam Yiu-chung. However the governing coalition between Tung Chee-hwa the DAB and the pro-business Liberal Party suffered from growing disunity as the popularity of Tung administration dropped. Although it continued provide stable support to the government as Beijing's demand, it paid a hefty political price in the sense of increasing middle-class disaffection with the party and growing rank-and file complaint. The DAB was increasingly frustrated by unequal political exchange with the government and the skimpy political rewards meted out by Tung. Tsang Yok-sing even openly aired his displeasure and advocated power sharing with the government.

In the wake of the controversies over the legislation of Article 23 of the Basic Law, which outlaws treason, sedition, subversion and secession against the central government, the image of DAB was severely undermined by its unconditional support and defence of the legislation. The November 2003 District Councils elections saw the worst electoral performance in party's history, only 62 of the 206 candidates were elected. The party vice-chairman and LegCo member Ip Kwok-him was defeated in his own power base and long-time headquarter Kwun Lung by the pro-democracy The Frontier member and LegCo member Cyd Ho Sau-lan by a narrow margin of 64 votes. The election results led to the resignation of chairman Tsang Yok-sing. Tsang claimed that the electoral setback was due to the DAB's "Tung loyalist" public image. In December the party's Standing Committee elected Ma Lik as Tsang's successor.

=== Late 2000s expansion and electoral victories (2004–2012) ===
The 2004 LegCo electoral campaign unfolded amid an economic rebound partly engineered by Beijing's up-lifting measures. The PRC athletes' impressive gains in the August 2004 Athens Olympics and the 50 Chinese Gold Medalists' visit to Hong Kong right before the polling induced among the voters a strong nationalistic pride that was beneficial to DAB candidates. The DAB also managed to exploit the proportional representation to equalise votes for two of the candidates the party endorsed standing in the same constituency. Although support of Chan Yuen-han (FTU) was far higher than Chan Kam-lam (DAB) in Kowloon East, according to earlier polls, the two organisations managed to have both elected. At Hong Kong Island constituency, the ticket of Ma Lik and Choy So-yuk ultimately benefitted from a democratic camp mix-up that led to the resignation of the Democratic Party Chairman, Yeung Sum. The DAB become the largest political party in the Legislative Council to be represented with 12 seats (if including the two members ran under the FTU banner), with the pro-business Liberal Party coming second with 10 seats and the Democratic Party coming third with 9 seats.

On 16 February 2005, the DAB merged with the Hong Kong Progressive Alliance, and was renamed as the Democratic Alliance for the Betterment and Progress of Hong Kong. The two parties were merged with new committees and leadership in May, Ma Lik was re-elected as chairman and Ip Kwok-him, Tam Yiu-chung, Maria Tam and Lau Kong-wah as vice-chairmen. Since the merge with the Progressive Alliance, the DAB has gradually leaned to a more pro-middle-class position. In April 2007 leadership election, solicitor Gregory So succeeded Maria Tam as the vice-chairman of the party. The four new Standing Committee members were all professionals; besides Gregory So, Cheung Kwok-kwan, the Chairman of the Young DAB was a solicitor, Starry Lee Wai-king was an accountant, Ben Chan Han-pan was an engineer. Meanwhile, the pro-labour and pro-grassroots FTU faction began to run in elections in their own banner. On 8 August 2007, Chairman Ma Lik died of cancer in Guangzhou. Tam Yiu-chung was elected as the new chairman by the Standing Committee on 28 August.

The District Council Elections in 2007 saw the great bounce back of the DAB by winning 115 seats, more than a quarter of the seats in the district level, far ahead of other political parties. Gregory So resigned as the vice-chairman and was succeeded by Ann Chiang when he was appointed as the Under Secretary for Commerce and Economic Development by Chief Executive Donald Tsang in May 2008, among other DAB members appointed to the government. Gregory So was later revealed by the media as having Canadian citizenship, which he had to renounce as a result. The scandal became an electoral issue in the following 2008 LegCo Election that the pan-democracy camp used to attack the DAB candidates. Nevertheless, the DAB remained as the largest party in the Legislative Council in the election, winning 13 seats in total (if including the FTU candidates who had DAB membership). Chan Yuen-han and Wong Kwok-hing were founding members of the DAB and used to run for the DAB, they began to run under the FTU banner with more pro-labour position. In October, Tsang Yok-sing, the founding Chairman of the DAB, was elected as the President of the Legislative Council, becoming the first LegCo President with party membership. His seat at the Executive Council was succeeded by vice-chairman Lau Kong-wah.

In the 2011 District Council Elections, the DAB recorded a greatest victory in party's history, accumulating 136 seats, about one-third of the total, more than all pro-democratic parties combined.

=== Leung Chun-ying era (2012–2017) ===
The DAB supported Leung Chun-ying in the 2012 Chief Executive election. In the Legislative Council elections in September, with the party's first use of the electoral tactics of splitting candidate lists, the DAB won three seats in the New Territories West for the first time and two seats Hong Kong Island since 2004. It continued as the largest political force supporting the SAR administration today.

The DAB stood firmly with the government in the constitutional reform debate in 2014–15, and subsequently the massive Occupy protests against the 2014 NPCSC decision. On 17 April 2015, Starry Lee Wai-king became the first woman to chair the party, succeeding the outgoing Tam Yiu-chung. In the 2015 District Council election, the first election under Starry Lee's chairmanship, the DAB retained its largest party status by winning 119 seats (including two who also ran under FTU banner), although incumbent legislators Christopher Chung and Elizabeth Quat were ousted by newcomers.

After the 2014 Occupy protests, there was an emerging pro-independence movement in which the DAB strongly opposed. In the 2016 New Territories East by-election, DAB member Holden Chow ran against the Civic Party's Alvin Yeung and pro-independence Hong Kong Indigenous' Edward Leung. Chow received about 35 per cent and about 10,000 votes short of the Civic Party candidate.

With four veteran incumbents, LegCo president Tsang Yok-sing, Tam Yiu-chung, Chan Kam-lam and Ip Kwok-him, retiring, the DAB set a more conservative electoral strategy in the 2016 Legislative Council election, fielding only nine candidate lists in the geographical constituencies and District Council (Second) functional constituency, two fewer than the last election. The DAB got all their nine candidate lists elected as a result with three traditional functional constituencies with a drop of their vote share from 20.22 to 16.68 per cent vote share. Chan Hak-kan succeeded Ip as the new caucus convenor.

In the 2017 Chief Executive election, the DAB which commanded over 100 seats in the Election Committee, endorsed and nominated former Chief Secretary for Administration Carrie Lam, which help her to defeat former Financial Secretary John Tsang with 777 votes. In return, the Carrie Lam administration appointed Cheung Kwok-kwan to be a new member in the Executive Council.

=== Carrie Lam era (2017–2022) ===
In the March 2018 Legislative Council by-election triggered by the disqualification of Youngspiration's Yau Wai-ching over the oath-taking controversy, the DAB supported its member Vincent Cheng and the former FTU legislator Tang Ka-piu who joined the DAB before the election to run in Kowloon West and New Territories East respectively. Despite Tang's loss, Cheng made a surprising upset by narrowly defeating independent democrat Yiu Chung-yim, making it the first time the pro-Beijing camp received greater vote share than the pro-democrats in a geographical constituency since 2000 and the first time a pro-Beijing candidate won in a geographical constituency by-election since 1992.

In October 2020, Apple Daily reported that Carrie Lam had blamed the DAB for failing to raise political support for her administration, saying the DAB had failed for years in providing the government with "talent." Lam was also reported to be unhappy with two government ministers from the DAB, and fired one but kept the other to avoid embarrassing the DAB.

In November 2020, following the expulsion of 4 pro-democracy lawmakers from the Legislative Council, the DAB expressed support for the decision and accused the pro-democracy lawmakers of harming the country's interest.

In February 2021, following calls from Xia Baolong that only "patriots" should be part of the government, the DAB supported his position and said that it should be done, as it claimed pro-democracy figures had done things "[I]ncluding advocating Hong Kong independence to poison young people, supporting black violence to damage the rule of law, colluding with foreign forces to interfere in Hong Kong's affairs and even attempting to steal the power to govern by running in an election to paralyse the government."

=== John Lee era (2022–present) ===
In August 2022, after Nancy Pelosi visited Taiwan, the DAB said it fully supported the mainland Chinese government and military in response to the visit.

== Ideology ==
The DAB is known as a Beijing loyalist party of "loving China and loving Hong Kong". It stresses the "one country" part of the "One country, two systems" principle. As for issues on democratic reform, it takes a position to support slower pace in relative to what the Democratic Party supports, DAB claims by doing so stability and prosperity will be achieved. Former party chairman Tam Yiu-chung claims the DAB to be "rational and pragmatic".

The party's main claim is that it is natural for ethnic Chinese in Hong Kong to be "patriotic" and support the government of the People's Republic of China. The party supports nearly every policy of the HKSAR Government.

- Furthering co-operation between Hong Kong and the mainland, promoting mutual trust, and creating opportunities economically.
- "Constructive monitor" of the HKSAR government, scrutinising various government policies and decisions, providing "constructive policy alternatives" whilst securing the progress, prosperity, social stability and harmony for Hong Kong.
- To break down social barriers based on the common interest of Hong Kong; to strengthen communications with Hong Kong residents to better reflect their opinion; to be more accountable to the public.
- To nurture political talent by committing the necessary funding, organising training, providing opportunities for those who want to take part in politics.

The DAB's support of social welfare improvements, including greater spending on education, housing, and employee retraining, has given it strong grassroots support.

The DAB was historically a left-wing party, but it is currently considered a big tent, centre-right or right-wing party. It had leaned to a more pro-middle-class position and professional-oriented since its merger with the Hong Kong Progressive Alliance (HKPA) in 2005.

The party also takes a social conservative stance, espousing 'traditional family values' and opposing same-sex marriage despite it not being in the party's official platform. The DAB collaborated with evangelical Christian organisations in 2006 in drafting a submission on "harmonious families". These organisations include the Hong Kong branches of the Full Gospel Business Men's Fellowship International and the Christian Broadcasting Network.

=== Internal factions ===
As the largest political party of Hong Kong, the party can be divided into several main factions:

- Business sector, with business and professionals background and also former members of the Hong Kong Progressive Alliance.
- Rural leaders representing the interests of Indigenous inhabitants of the New Territories.
- Members with Hong Kong Federation of Education Workers background.
- Unionists, i.e. members belonging or came from the Hong Kong Federation of Trade Unions.

== Controversies ==
=== Comments of Tiananmen massacre ===
On 15 May 2007, then-party chairman Ma Lik provoked widespread condemnation within the local community when he claimed that "there was not a massacre" during the Tiananmen Square protests of 1989, as there was "no intentional and indiscriminate shooting". He said the popular belief of foreigners' "rash claims" that a massacre took place showed Hong Kong's lack of maturity. He said that Hong Kong showed, through this lack of patriotism and national identity, that it would thus "not be ready for democracy until 2022".

Vice-chairman Tam Yiu-chung defended Ma, but questioned the timing: "people will understand it gradually". However, Vice-chairman Lau Kong-wah immediately offered to apologise, and distanced the party from Ma, saying that Ma had expressed "a personal opinion". The DAB Central committee declined any further action against Ma following their meeting, and there was no official apology.

=== Allegations of irregularities ===
The DAB has been accused by pro-democracy media and politicians of providing benefits to certain people, including seafood meals and local trips to outlying islands at prices significantly lower than market rates to win their support. Other allegations include arranging free transport to mobilise people for their causes.

During the 2015 District Council elections, the South China Morning Post reported that elderly residents of care homes were being bussed to polling stations by DAB-arranged transport. A DAB candidate, Daniel Lam Tak-shing, was alleged to have instructed them on who to vote for outside of a polling station, raising questions on whether those votes were cast of their own will. He was also accused of giving out free gifts to these residents. However, none of these practices are strictly illegal in Hong Kong.

== Young DAB ==
The youth wing is the Young Democratic Alliance for the Betterment and Progress of Hong Kong (Young DAB). In August 2022, it released results of a survey, showing that 30% of those polled in Hong Kong did not identify as being Chinese. The Young DAB said that the government should enhance national identity, and vice-chairman Nicholas Muk Ka-chun said that "If you've looked at the Education Bureau's website [...] you would have noticed that the word 'patriot' does not exist".

== Election performances ==
=== Legislative Council elections ===
Election	Number of popular votes	% of popular votes	GC seats	FC seats	EC seats	Total seats	+/−	Position
1995	142,801	15.66	2	2	2	6 / 60	5▲	3rd
1998	373,428▲	25.23▲	5	2	2	9 / 60	–	3rd
2000	374,780▲	28.40▲	7	3	1	11 / 60	2▲	2nd
2004	454,827▲	25.49▼	9	3		12 / 60	2▲	1st▲
2008	433,684▼	28.45▲	9	4		13 / 60	2▲	1st
2012	366,140▼	20.22▼	9	4		13 / 70	3▲	1st
2016	361,617▼	16.68▼	7	5		12 / 70	1▼	1st
2021	680,563▲	51.43▲	10	4	5	19 / 90	6▲	1st
2025	432,473▼	33.88▼	10	2	8	20 / 90	1▲	1st

=== Municipal elections ===
Election	Number of popular votes	% of popular votes	UrbCo seats	RegCo seats	Total elected seats
1995	90,548	16.24	5 / 32	3 / 27	8 / 59

=== District Councils elections ===
Election	Number of popular votes	% of popular votes	D.E. seats	E.C. seats	App. seats	Ex off. seats	Total seats	+/−
1994	81,126	11.82	37			0	37 / 346	12▲
1999	190,792▲	23.53▲	83		13	0	83 / 390	27▲
2003	241,202▲	22.94▼	62		14	0	62 / 400	21▼
2007	292,916▲	25.73▲	115		14	0	115 / 405	40▲
2011	282,119▼	23.89▼	136		11	1	136 / 412	16▲
2015	309,262▲	21.39▼	119			1	119 / 431	0
2019	492,042▲	16.78▼	21			0	21 / 452	96▼
2023	486,942▼	41.58▲	41	68	38	0	147 / 470	126▲

== Leadership ==
=== Chairpersons ===
No.	Chairman (Birth–Death)	Portrait	Constituency	Took office	Left office	Duration
1	Tsang Yok-sing (born 1947)		Kowloon West (1998–2008)	10 July 1992	3 December 2003	11 years and 147 days
2	Ma Lik (1952–2007)		Hong Kong Island	9 December 2003	8 August 2007 (Note: Died in office, Tam Yiu-chung served as acting chair between 28 August to 3 September 2007.)	3 years and 243 days
Act.	Tam Yiu-chung (born 1949)		New Territories West	28 August 2007	3 September 2007	7 days
3	Tam Yiu-chung (born 1949)		New Territories West	3 September 2007	17 April 2015	7 years and 227 days
4	Starry Lee (born 1974)		District Council (Second) (2012–2021); Kowloon Central (2021–present)	17 April 2015	25 September 2023	8 years and 162 days
5	Gary Chan (born 1976)		New Territories North East	25 September 2023	Incumbent	3 years and 14 days

=== Vice-Chairpersons ===
- Tam Yiu-chung, 1992–1997, 2002–2007
- Cheng Kai-nam, 1997–2000
- Ip Kwok-him, 1998–2009
- Lo Chi-keung, 2000–2005
- Maria Tam Wai-chu, 2005–2007
- Lau Kong-wah, 2005–2012
- Gregory So Kam-leung, 2007–2008
- Ann Chiang Lai-wan, 2008–2015
- Carson Wen, 2009–2011
- Horace Cheung Kwok-kwan, 2011–2022
- Starry Lee Wai-king, 2011–2015
- Thomas Pang Cheung-wai, 2013–2019
- Brave Chan Yung, 2013–present
- Gary Chan Hak-kan, 2015–2023
- Holden Chow Ho-ding, 2015–present
- Chan Hok-fung, 2019–2021
- Thomas Pang Cheung-wai, 2021–2023
- Ben Chan Han-pan, 2023–present
- Elizabeth Quat, 2023–present

=== Secretaries general ===
- Cheng Kai-nam, 1992–1997
- Ma Lik, 1997–2003
- Kan Chi-ho, 2003–2009
- Thomas Pang Cheung-wai, 2009–2013
- Chan Hok-fung, 2013–2019
- Albert Wong Shun-yee, 2019–2021
- Chan Hok-fung, 2021–present

=== Treasurers ===
- Wong Kine-yuen, 1992–2017
- Chong Wai-ming, 2017–present

=== Deputy secretaries general ===
- Tso Wong Man-yin, 2005–2009
- Albert Wong Shun-yee, 2009–2011
- Chan Hok-fung, 2011–2013
- Chris Ip Ngo-tung, 2013–present
- Kin Hung Kam-in, 2017–present
- Vincent Cheng Wing-shun, 2017–present
- Joe Lai Wing-ho, 2017–present
- Frankie Ngan Man-yu, 2019–present

=== Senate chairmen ===
- Jose Sun-Say Yu, 2005–2015
- Lo Man-tuen, 2015–present

== Representatives ==
=== Executive Council ===
- Gary Chan
- Christopher Hui (as Secretary for Financial Services and the Treasury)

=== Legislative Council ===
Constituency	Member
Hong Kong Island East	Edward Leung Hei
Hong Kong Island West	Chan Hok-fung
Kowloon West	Vincent Cheng Wing-shun
Kowloon East	Ngan Man-yu
Kowloon Central	Starry Lee Wai-king
New Territories South East	Li Sai-wing
New Territories North	Lau Kwok-fan
New Territories North West	Holden Chow Ho-ding
New Territories South West	Chan Han-pan
New Territories North East	Chan Hak-kan
Agriculture and Fisheries	Steven Ho Chun-yin
Accountancy	Edmund Wong Chun-sek
Import and Export	Kennedy Wong Ying-ho
HKSAR Members of NPCCC and CPPCC	Chan Yung
Election Committee	Rock Chen Chung-nin
Election Committee	Nixie Lam
Election Committee	Elizabeth Quat
Election Committee	Lillian Kwok Ling-lai
Election Committee	Chan Wing-kwong

=== District Councils ===
The DAB has won 109 seats in all 18 District Councils (2024–2027):

District	Constituency	Member	District	Constituency	Member
Hong Kong Island & Kowloon			New Territories		
Central and Western	Central	Jan Noel Shih	Tsuen Wan	Tsuen Wan Northwest	Matthew Wong Kai-chun
Central and Western	Western	Timothy Lau Tin-ching	Tsuen Wan	Tsuen Wan Southwest	Ng Chun-yu
Central and Western	District Committees	Yeung Hok-ming	Tsuen Wan	District Committees	Tsang Tai
Central and Western	District Committees	Iris Cheung Ka-yan	Tsuen Wan	District Committees	Jones Chan Chun-ching
Central and Western	District Committees	Yeung Hoi-wing	Tsuen Wan	District Committees	Marco Chow Sum-ming
Central and Western	Appointed	Ip Yik-nam	Tsuen Wan	District Committees	Lau Chung-kwong
Wan Chai	Wan Chai	Nicholas Muk Ka-chun	Tsuen Wan	Appointed	Koo Yeung-pong
Eastern	Tai Pak	Eddie Ting Ko-ho	Tuen Mun	Tuen Mun East	Terry Yip Man-pan
Eastern	Hong Wan	Annie Lee Ching-har	Tuen Mun	Tuen Mun West	Chung Kin-fugn
Eastern	Chai Wan	Elaine Chik Kit-ling	Tuen Mun	Tuen Mun North	Apple Lai Ka-man
Eastern	District Committees	Wong Chi-chung	Tuen Mun	District Committees	Tsang Hin-hong
Eastern	District Committees	Lam Wing-shing	Tuen Mun	District Committees	Ching Chi-hung
Eastern	District Committees	Hung Chi-kit	Tuen Mun	District Committees	Chan Tsim-heng
Eastern	District Committees	Kwok Wing-kin	Tuen Mun	District Committees	Johnny Ip Chun-yuen
Eastern	District Committees	Joseph Chan Hoi-wing	Tuen Mun	District Committees	Jason Tsoi Shing-hin
Eastern	District Committees	Lau Suk-yin	Tuen Mun	Appointed	Rex Mo Shing-fung
Eastern	Appointed	Lam Sum-lim	Yuen Long	Yuen Long Town Centre	Riben Li Kai-lap
Eastern	Appointed	Hung Lin-cham	Yuen Long	Yuen Long Rural East	Chui Kwan-siu
Eastern	Appointed	Cheng Chi-sing	Yuen Long	Tin Shui Wai South and Ping Ha	Terry So Yuen
Eastern	Appointed	Lau Hing-yeung	Yuen Long	Tin Shui Wai North	Fennie Lai Yuet-kwan
Southern	Southern District Northwest	Cheung Lai-nam	Yuen Long	District Committees	Tom Tong Tak-chun
Southern	District Committees	Sunny Wong Choi-lap	Yuen Long	District Committees	Leung Yip-pang
Southern	District Committees	Victor Lau Ngai	Yuen Long	District Committees	Ma Shuk-yin
Southern	District Committees	Danny Siu Wai-chung	Yuen Long	District Committees	Lam Wai-ming
Southern	District Committees	Nicole Wong Yu-ching	Yuen Long	District Committees	Calvin Sze To Chun-hin
Southern	Appointed	Roy Chu Lap-wai	Yuen Long	Appointed	Yu Chung-leung
Southern	Appointed	Li Kai-ying	Yuen Long	Appointed	Lui Kin
Southern	Appointed	Chan Yuk-kit	Yuen Long	Appointed	Weelie Wong Wai-ling
Yau Tsim Mong	Yau Tsim Mong South	Chris Ip Ngo-tung	North	Wu Tip Shan	Yiu Ming
Yau Tsim Mong	Yau Tsim Mong North	Lee Ka-hin	North	Robin's Nest	Ko Wai-kei
Yau Tsim Mong	District Committees	Benjamin Choi Siu-fung	North	District Committees	Lau Chun-hoi
Yau Tsim Mong	District Committees	Craig Jo Chun-wah	North	District Committees	Sherwood Ng Yiu-cho
Yau Tsim Mong	District Committees	Lau Pak-kei	North	District Committees	Ray Hau Hon-shek
Yau Tsim Mong	District Committees	Alex Poon King-wo	North	District Committees	Wu King-pang
Yau Tsim Mong	Appointed	Benny Yeung Tsz-hei	North	District Committees	Phillip Tsang Hing-lung
Yau Tsim Mong	Appointed	Edmond Chung Kong-mo	North	District Committees	Pun Hau-man
Sham Shui Po	Sham Shui Po West	Leo Ho Kwan-chau	North	District Committees	Windy Or Sin-yi
Sham Shui Po	Sham Shui Po East	Raymond Lam Wai-man	North	Appointed	Chu Ho-yin
Sham Shui Po	District Committees	Wu Wanqiu	North	Appointed	Wan Wo-fai
Sham Shui Po	District Committees	Cheung Tak-wai	North	Appointed	Lai Sum
Sham Shui Po	District Committees	Chan Lung-kit	Tai Po	Tai Po South	Peggy Wong Pik-kiu
Sham Shui Po	Appointed	Samuel Chan Wai-ming	Tai Po	Tai Po North	Wu Cheuk-him
Sham Shui Po	Appointed	Wong Chung-leung	Tai Po	District Committees	Lee Man-kit
Sham Shui Po	Appointed	Nicole Lau Pui-yuk	Tai Po	District Committees	Barry Mui Siu-fung
Kowloon City	Kowloon City North	Yeung Chun-yu	Tai Po	District Committees	Wong Wai-tung
Kowloon City	Kowloon City South	Ng Po-keung	Tai Po	Appointed	Chan Pok-chi
Kowloon City	District Committees	Chan Chi-wah	Sai Kung	Sai Kung and Hang Hau	Yau Ho-lun
Kowloon City	District Committees	Ng Fan-kam	Sai Kung	Tseung Kwan O South	Amber Sze Pan-pan
Kowloon City	Appointed	Lam Tak-shing	Sai Kung	Tseung Kwan O North	Edwin Wan Kai-ming
Kowloon City	Appointed	Poon Kwok-wah	Sai Kung	District Committees	Phillip Li Ka-leung
Wong Tai Sin	Wong Tai Sin East	Kyle Yuet Ngai-keung	Sai Kung	District Committees	Kan Tung-tung
Wong Tai Sin	Wong Tai Sin West	Poon Cheuk-bun	Sai Kung	District Committees	Chau Ka-lok
Wong Tai Sin	District Committee	Yuen Kwok-keung	Sai Kung	Appointed	Ki Lai-mei
Wong Tai Sin	District Committee	Joe Lai Wing-ho	Sai Kung	Appointed	Chong Yuen-tung
Wong Tai Sin	Appointed	Leung Tang-fung	Sai Kung	Appointed	Angel Chong Nga-ting
Kwun Tong	Kwun Tong Central	Wilson Or Chong-shing	Sai Kung	Appointed	Chan Kuen-kwan
Kwun Tong	Kwun Tong North	Cheung Pui-kong	Sha Tin	Sha Tin West	Chan Tan-tan
Kwun Tong	Kwun Tong West	Tam Siu-cheuk	Sha Tin	Sha Tin East	Chu Wun-chiu
Kwun Tong	District Committees	Cheung Yiu-pan	Sha Tin	Sha Tin North	Choi Wai-shing
Kwun Tong	District Committees	Derek Tsang Wing-fai	Sha Tin	District Committees	Maisy Kung Mei-chi
Kwun Tong	District Committees	April Feng Yunsi	Sha Tin	District Committees	Ronald Yeung Ying-hon
Kwun Tong	District Committees	Au Yeung Kwan-nok	Sha Tin	District Committees	Ng Kai-tai
Kwun Tong	Appointed	Hung Kam-in	Sha Tin	District Committees	Mok Hei-man
Kwun Tong	Appointed	Hsu Yau-wai	Sha Tin	Appointed	Kelly Tung King-lei
Kwun Tong	Appointed	Jack Cheung Ki-tang	Sha Tin		Roy Lam Kwong-kwan
Kwun Tong	Appointed	Juliana Yu	Kwai Tsing	Tsing Yi	Lo Yuen-ting
			Kwai Tsing	Kwai Tsing East	Jody Kwok Fu-yung
			Kwai Tsing	Kwai Tsing West	Wong Chun-yeung
			Kwai Tsing	District Committees	Ng Kin-wah
			Kwai Tsing	District Committees	Tang Lai-ling
			Kwai Tsing	District Committees	Lam Ying-wai
			Kwai Tsing	District Committees	Yuen Yun-hung
			Kwai Tsing	District Committees	Wong Shuk-man
			Kwai Tsing	District Committees	Benny Ng Yam-fung
			Kwai Tsing	District Committees	Ng Chi-wah
			Kwai Tsing	District Committees	Wong Siu-kwan
			Kwai Tsing	Appointed	Chu Lai-ling
			Kwai Tsing	Appointed	Leung Kar-ming
			Kwai Tsing	Appointed	Poon Chi-sing
			Islands	Islands	Yip Pui-kei
			Islands	District Committees	Mealoha Kwok Wai-man
			Islands	District Committees	Lau Shun-ting

=== National People's Congress ===
- Chan Yung
- Choy So-yuk
- Ip Kwok-him
- Tam Yiu-chung (NPCSC member)
- Wong Ting-chung

=== Chinese People’s Political Consultative Conference ===
- Chau On Ta-yuen
- Rock Chen Chung-nin
- Chong Shaw-swee
- Chung Shui-ming
- Ip Shun-hing
- Starry Lee Wai-king
- Leung Che-cheung
- Lo Siu-kit
- Nancy Wong
- Michael Ngai Ming-tak
- Thomas Pang Cheung-wai
- Irons Sze
- Ricky Tsang Chi-ming
- Wong Ming-yeung
- Yu Kwok-chun
- Zhou Chun-ling

== See also ==
- United Front Work Department
- United Front (China)
- Politics of Hong Kong
- List of political parties in Hong Kong
