= Huang Chen-ya =

Huang Chen-ya MBE
- 黃震遐

Member of the Legislative Council
- In office 9 October 1991 – 30 June 1997
- Preceded by: New constituency
- Succeeded by: Abolished
- Constituency: Hong Kong Island West

Personal details
- Born: 4 November 1939 (age 86) Singapore, Straits Settlements
- Party: Hong Kong Affairs Society (1984–1990); United Democrats (1990–94); Democratic Party (1994–2025)
- Spouse: Chak-yee
- Education: University of Sydney (BSc Hons); University of Hong Kong (MBBS); University of Singapore (MMed)
- Occupation: Medical Practitioner

Huang Chen-ya
- Traditional Chinese: 黃震遐
- Simplified Chinese: 黄震遐
Transcriptions
Standard Mandarin
- Hanyu Pinyin: Huáng Zhènxiá
Yue: Cantonese
- Yale Romanization: Wòhng Jan hàh
- Jyutping: Wong^{4} Zan^{3} haa^{4}

Huang Chen-ya MBE (Chinese: 黃震遐; born 4 November 1939) is a Hong Kong neurologist and former politician. He was a member of the Democratic Party and was the member of the Legislative Council of Hong Kong (1991–97) for Hong Kong Island West.

== Biography ==
He was a third-generation Chinese Singaporean. His father, Huang Ying Jung, was educated in law in China and the United States and obtained a doctoral degree and later opened up a law firm in Shanghai and taught at the National Central University and the Soochow University. Born in Shanghai in 1939, Huang moved with his father to his father's birthplace in 1949, where his father took a teaching post at the Nanyang University and later became the university's acting vice-chancellor.

Huang was educated in Singapore and Australia and attended the Medical School of the University of Hong Kong in 1963. He was an editor of the student journal, Undergrad, and resigned from the post with other editors to protest against the university's decision to cut the Chinese version of the journal in 1965. Huang's move sparked the discussion on the discrimination against the usage of Chinese language, in which he advocated the Chinese Movement and the use of Chinese as a medium in the Hong Kong University Students' Union. He also led the students to do voluntary work in the society.

In 1970, Huang moved to Australia to further his studies in neurology for 10 years. He promoted the welfare of Australian Chinese and fought against racial discrimination. In 1981, he returned to Hong Kong and took up a teaching post at the University of Hong Kong. He founded the Hong Kong Affairs Society in 1984 and became its first president. Along with the Meeting Point and Hong Kong Association for Democracy and People's Livelihood, the society took the leading role in calling for increased democracy before and after 1997 as well as the implementation of the Sino-British Joint Declaration. The society later joined the United Democrats of Hong Kong, the first major pro-democracy party in Hong Kong, in 1990. He was elected as Southern District Board member in 1991 District Board elections in which he held the post until 2003.

He was elected to the Legislative Council of Hong Kong in the first ever direct elections in 1991 through Hong Kong Island West with Democratic Party vice-chairman Yeung Sum, receiving 31,052 votes. He was re-elected in 1995 with 31,156 votes, 66 percent of the vote share. He held the position until the end of the colonial rule when all pro-democracy Legislative Council members boycotted the Beijing-installed Provisional Legislative Council in 1997.

He was involved in the development of a new programme of Chinese input method for seven years after his retirement from politics. He is also a Fellow of the Royal Australasian College of Physicians and honorary clinical lecturer of the Department of Medicine at the University of Hong Kong.

== Previous public services ==
- President, Federation of Medical Societies
- Member, Preparatory Committee for Hong Kong Academy of Medicine
- Member, Law Enforcement and Criminal Injuries Compensation Board
- Member, Southern District Board
- President, Senate, United Democrats of Hong Kong
