= 2016 Hong Kong legislative election in District Council (Second) =

- 4 September 2016

All 5 District Council (Second) seats to the Legislative Council
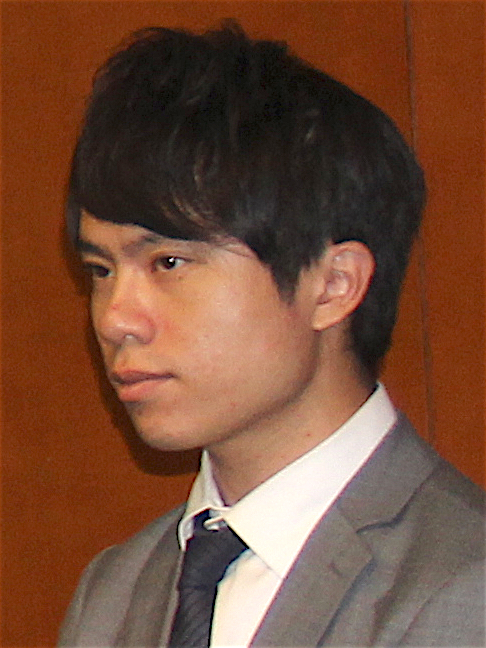

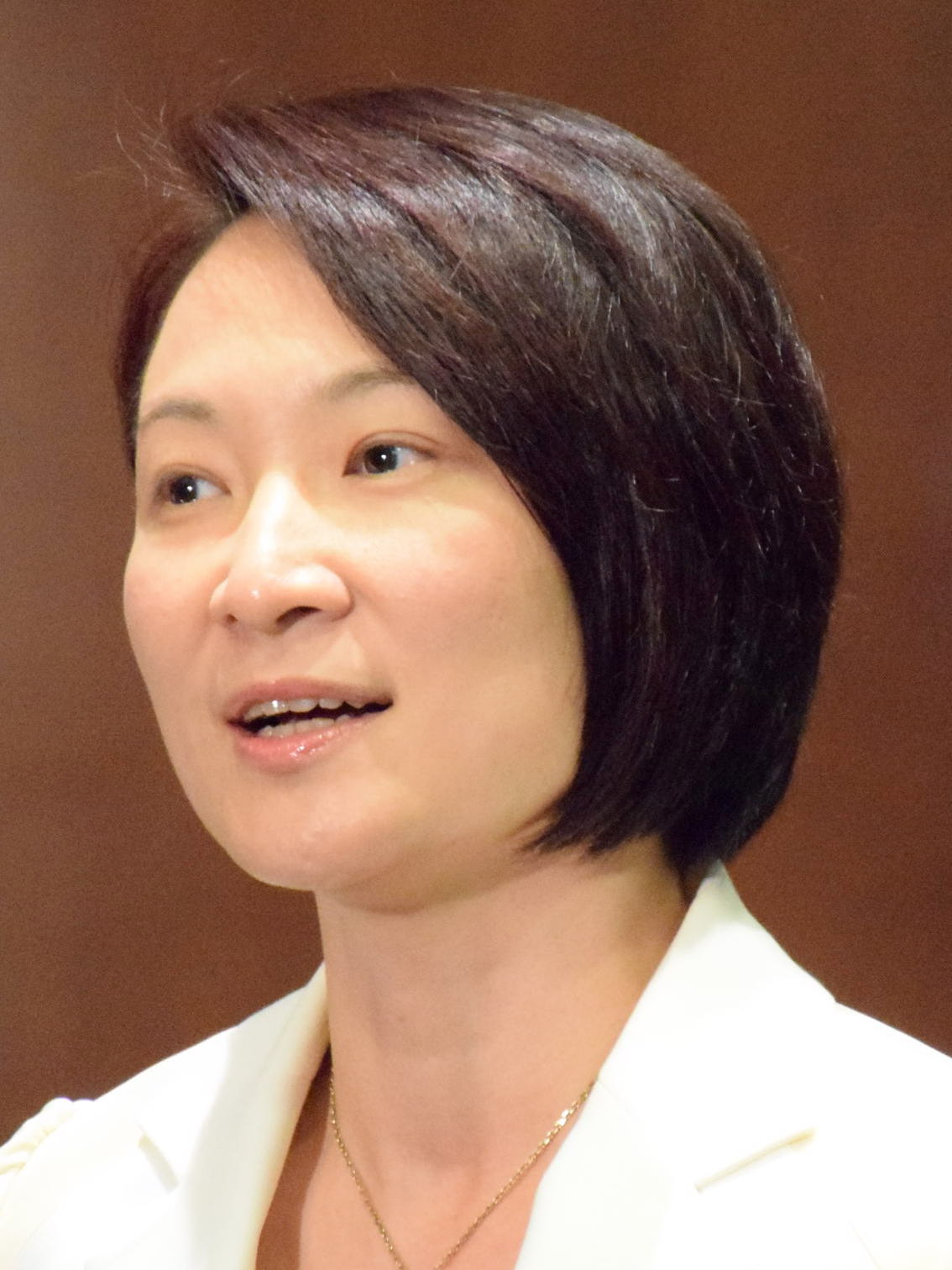

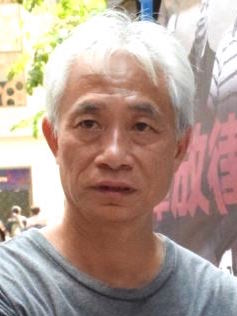
	First party	Second party	Third party
Leader	Roy Kwong & James To	Starry Lee & Holden Chow	Leung Yiu-chung
Party	Democratic	DAB	NWSC
Alliance	Pan-democracy	Pro-Beijing	Pan-democracy
Leader's seat	Pek Long & Olympic	To Kwa Wan North & Tung Chung South	Kwai Fong
Last election	2 seats, 38.5%	1 seat, 30.0%	N/A
Seats before	2	1	0
Seats won	2	2	1
Seat change	Steady	▲1	▲1
Popular vote	735,597	568,561	303,457
Percentage	38.5%	29.8%	15.9%
Swing	▲4.2%	▼0.2%	N/A
- Party with most votes in each District Council Constituency.

These are the District Council (Second) functional constituency results of the 2016 Legislative Council election. The election was held on 4 September 2016 and all 5 seats in were contested. The pan-democracy camp failed to achieve coordination and fielded six candidate lists while the pro-Beijing camp fielded only three seats, two for Democratic Alliance for the Betterment and Progress of Hong Kong (DAB) and one for the Hong Kong Federation of Trade Unions (FTU). FTU incumbent Chan Yuen-han was no longer eligible for running as she retired from the District Council and Association for Democracy and People's Livelihood (ADPL) and Democratic Party incumbents Frederick Fung and Albert Ho lost their eligibility for running as they lost their District Council seats.

The Democratic Party and the DAB both fielded their young candidates, Kwong Chun-yu and Holden Chow, to fight for the last seat, in which they were neck-to-neck in the opinion polls, while Democratic Party veteran James To, DAB chairwoman Starry Lee, Neighbourhood and Worker's Service Centre's (NWSC) veteran Leung Yiu-chung and FTU veteran Wong Kwok-hing led comfortably in the polls. 48 hours before the election day, three pro-democrat candidates Sumly Chan of Civic Party, Ho Kai-ming of ADPL and Kwan Wing-yip of Neo Democrats abandoned their campaign to boost the chance for Kwong to win the last seat. Pro-democrat scholar Benny Tai's "smart voters" plan also ask his participants to vote for Kwong. As a result, Kwong received the highest votes of 491,667 while James To won the last seat by defeating Wong Kwok-hing with a margin of 10,694 votes.

== Overall results ==
Before election:

↓
3	2
Anti-establishment	Pro-establishment

Change in composition:

↓
3	2
Anti-establishment	Pro-establishment

Party	Seats	Seats change	Contesting list(s)	Votes	%	% change
Democratic	2	0	2	735,597	38.5	+4.2
NWSC	1	+1	1	303,457	15.9	N/A
Civic	0	0	1	28,311	1.5	N/A
Neo Democrats	0	0	1	22,631	1.2	N/A
ADPL	0	–1	0	17,175	0.9	–15.6
Pro-democracy camp	3	0	3	1,108,171	58.0	+7.2
DAB	2	+1	2	568,561	29.8	–0.2
FTU	0	–1	1	233,236	12.6	–3.3
Pro-Beijing camp	2	0	3	801,797	45.4	–3.4
Turnout:				1,909,968	57.1	+5.1

== Candidates list ==
Vote share
1. Democratic (38.5%)
2. DAB (29.8%)
3. NWSC (15.9%)
4. FTU (12.2%)
5. Civic (1.48%)
6. Neo Democrats (1.24%)
7. ADPL (0.90%)

Legislative Election 2012: District Council (Second)
List	Candidates	Votes	Of total (%)	± from prev.
Democratic	Kwong Chun-yu	491,667	25.74 (20.00+5.74)	+11.36
DAB	Starry Lee Wai-king Hung Lin-cham, Chu Lap-wai, Ngan Man-yu, Siu Ka-yi	304,222	15.93	–1.48
NWSC	Leung Yiu-chung	303,457	15.89	N/A
DAB	Holden Chow Ho-ding Li Sai-wing, Nixie Lam Lam, Mo Shing-fung	264,339	13.84	+1.29
Democratic	James To Kun-sun	243,930	12.77	–7.11
FTU	Wong Kwok-hing, Mok Kin-wing, Wong Wang-to, Lau Kwai-yung	233,236	12.21	–3.26
Civic	Sumly Chan Yuen-sum	28,311	1.48	N/A
Neo Democrats	Kwan Wing-yip, Hui Yui-yu, Lai Ming-chak	22,631	1.24	N/A
ADPL	Kalvin Ho Kai-ming	17,175	0.90	N/A
Total valid votes		1,909,968	100.00	
Rejected ballots		73,081		
Turnout		1,983,049	57.09	–5.14
Registered electors		3,473,792		

== See also ==
- Legislative Council of Hong Kong
- Hong Kong legislative elections
- 2016 Hong Kong legislative election
