= 2008 Hong Kong legislative election in New Territories West =

- 7 September 2008

All 8 New Territories West seats to the Legislative Council
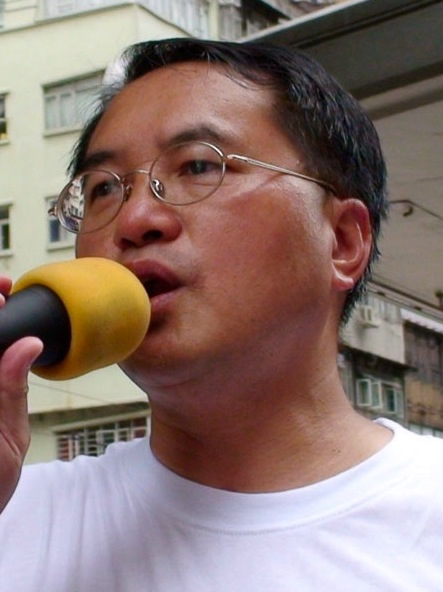

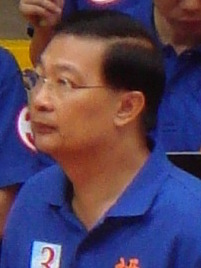

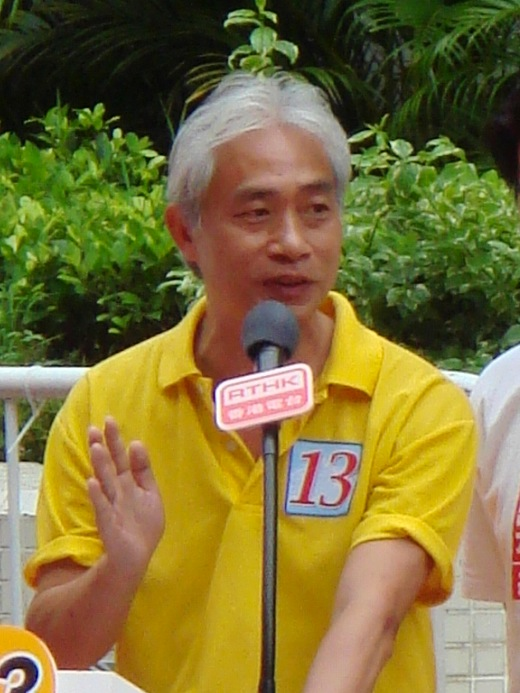

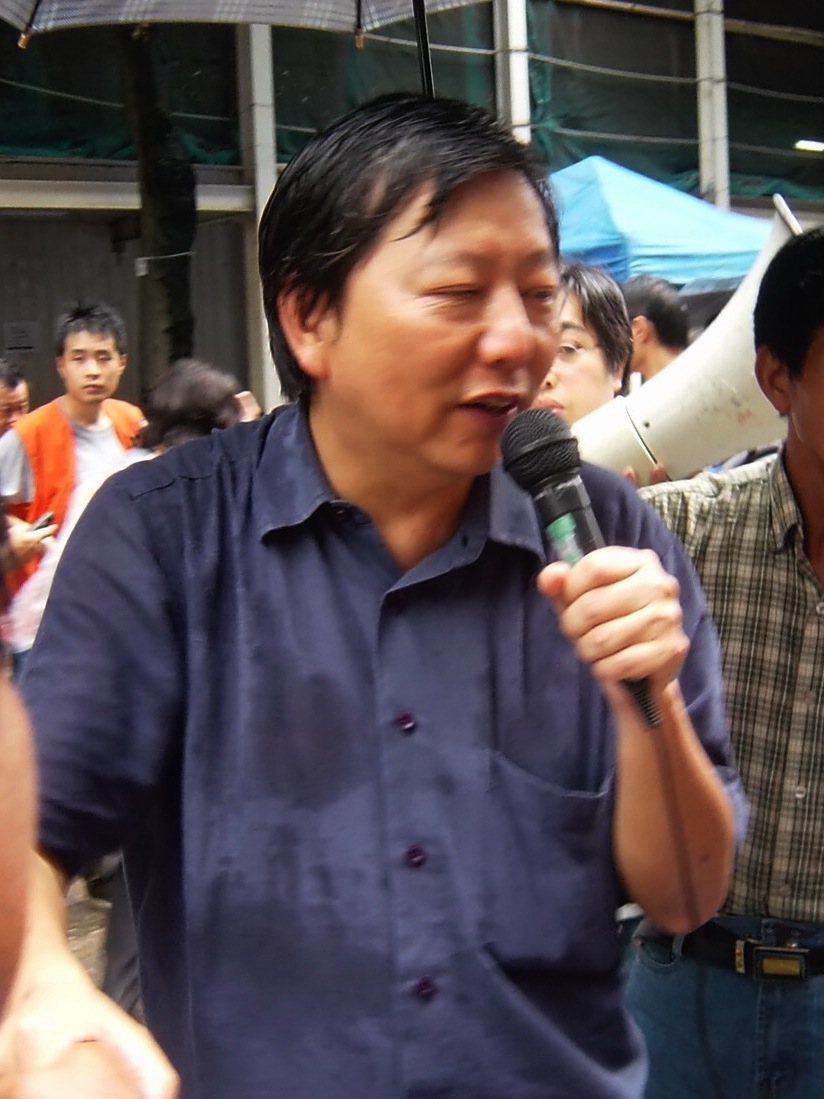

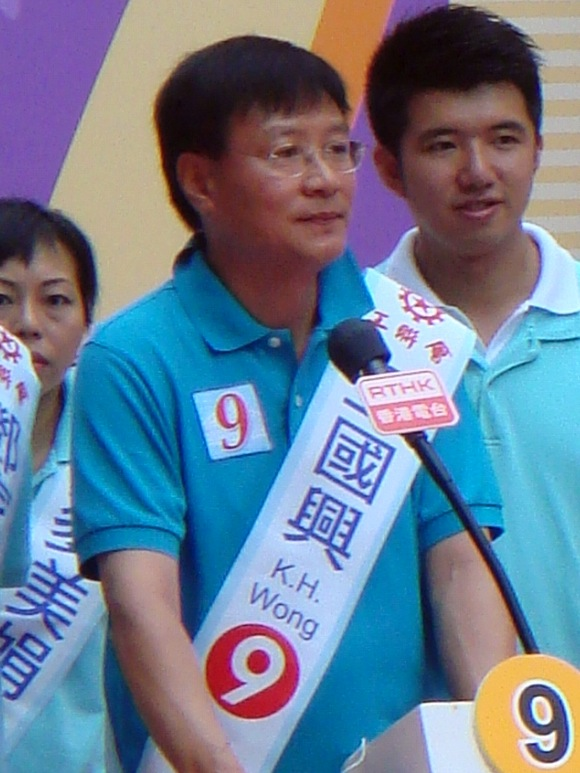

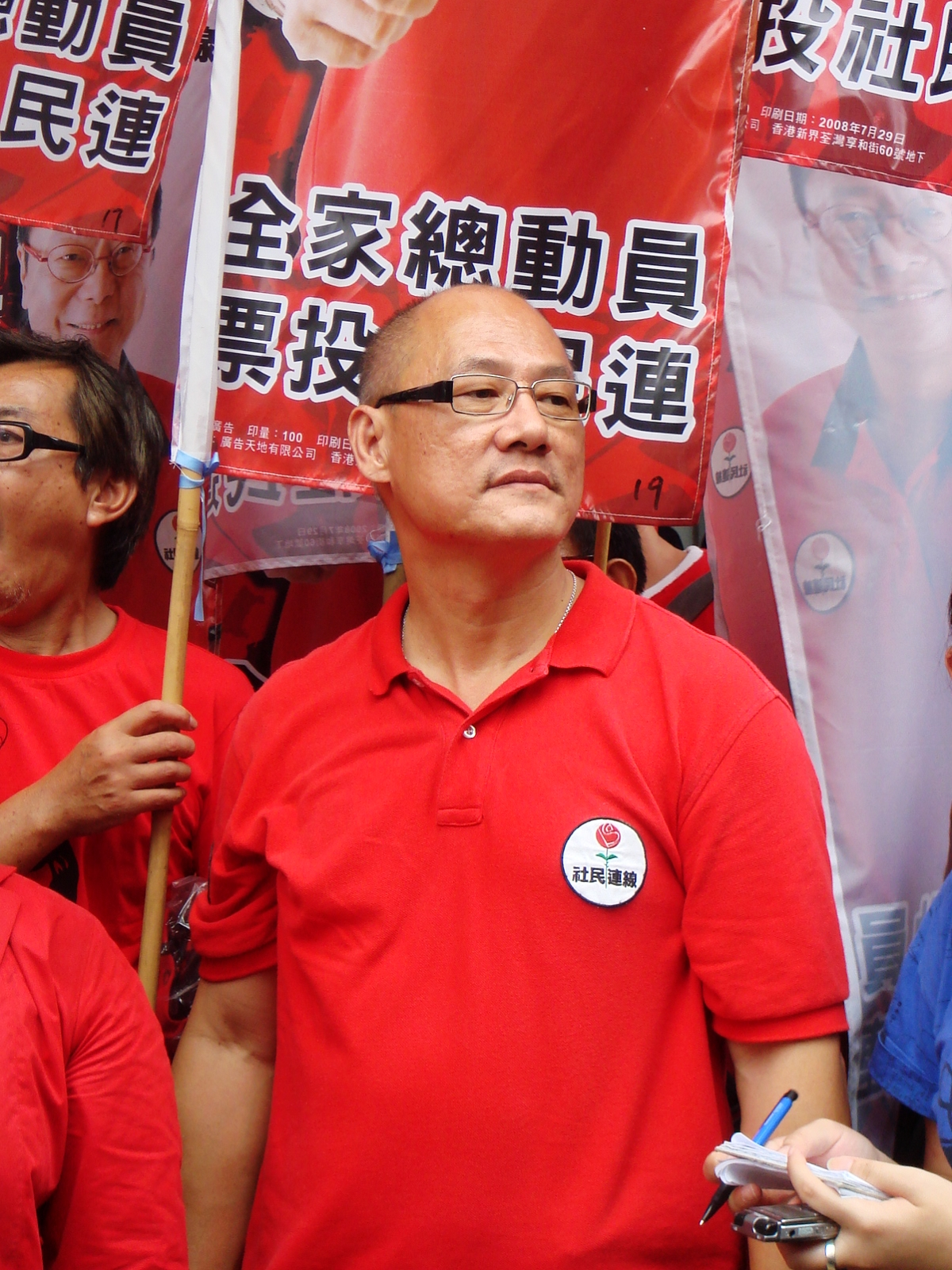
	First party	Second party	Third party
Leader	Lee Wing-tat, Albert Ho & Cheung Yin-tung	Tam Yiu-chung	Leung Yiu-chung
Party	Democratic	DAB	NWSC
Alliance	Pan-democracy	Pro-Beijing	Pan-democracy
Last election	2 seats, 26.9%	2 seats, 24.9%	1 seat, 12.7%
Seats before	2	2	1
Seats won	2	2	1
Seat change	Steady	Steady	Steady
Popular vote	92,600	92,037	42,441
Percentage	23.2%	23.1%	10.7%
Swing	▼3.7%	▼1.8%	▼2.0%
	Fourth party	Fifth party	Sixth party
Leader	Lee Cheuk-yan	Wong Kwok-hing	Albert Chan
Party	CTU	FTU	LSD
Alliance	Pan-democracy	Pro-Beijing	Pan-democracy
Last election	1 seat, 9.9%	Did not contest	1 seat, 7.8%
Seats before	1	0	1
Seats won	1	1	1
Seat change	Steady	▲1	Steady
Popular vote	42,366	35,991	32,182
Percentage	10.6%	9.0%	8.1%
Swing	▼0.7%	N/A	▲0.3%
- Party with most votes in each District Council Constituency.

These are the New Territories West results of the 2008 Hong Kong legislative election. The election was held on 7 September 2008 and all 8 seats in New Territories West, which consists of Tsuen Wan District, Tuen Mun District, Yuen Long District, Kwai Tsing District and Islands District, were contested. All the incumbents were elected except for Selina Chow of the Liberal Party, which was succeeded by Wong Kwok-hing of the Hong Kong Federation of Trade Unions who contested in the constituency for the first time.

== Overall results ==
Before election:

↓
5	3
Pan-democracy	Pro-Beijing

Change in composition:

↓
5	3
Pan-democracy	Pro-Beijing

Party	Seats	Seats change	Contesting list(s)	Votes	%	% change
Democratic	2	0	3	92,600	23.2	−3.7
NWSC	1	0	1	42,441	10.7	−2.0
CTU	1	0	1	42,366	10.6	−0.7
LSD	1	0	1	32,182	8.1	+0.3
Civic	0	0	1	27,910	7.0	N/A
ADPL	0	0	1	6,771	1.7	–1.4
Pro-democracy camp	5	0	8	244,270	61.3	+0.8
DAB	2	0	1	92,037	23.1	−1.8
FTU	1	+1	1	35,991	9.0	N/A
Liberal	0	–1	1	21,570	5.4	–5.5
Independent	0	0	1	1,720	0.4	N/A
Pro-Beijing camp	3	0	4	151,318	38.0	+5.7
Independent	0	0	2	2,704	0.6	N/A
Turnout:				398,292	42.5	

== Candidates list ==
Legislative Election 2008: New Territories West
List	Candidates	Votes	Of total (%)	± from prev.
DAB	Tam Yiu-chung, Cheung Hok-ming Leung Che-cheung, Chan Han-pan, Lung Shui-hing, Leung Kar-ming, Andy Lo Kwong-shing, Lui Kin	92,037	23.1 (12.50+10.61)	−1.77
Democratic	Lee Wing-tat Wong Suet-ying, Lam Siu-fat, Cheung Wai-mei, Lam Lap-chi	45,767	11.5	−1.99
NWSC	Leung Yiu-chung Wong Yun-tat	42,441	10.7	−2.04
CTU	Lee Cheuk-yan Tam Chun-yin	42,366	10.6	+0.73
Democratic	Ho Chun-yan Hui Chi-fung, Lo Man-hon	36,764	9.2	−4.25
FTU (DAB)	Wong Kwok-hing Alice Mak Mei-kuen, Marina Tsang Tze-kwan, Tsui Fan, Dennis Leung Tsz-wing, Tang Ka-piu, Yiu Kwok-wai, Manwell Chan	35,991	9.0	N/A
LSD	Albert Chan Wai-yip	32,182	8.1	+0.27
Civic	Fernando Cheung Chiu-hung, Sumly Chan Yuen-sum, Wong Ka-wa	27,910	7.0	N/A
Liberal	Selina Chow Liang Shuk-yee, Chow Wing-kan	21,570	5.4	−5.48
Democratic	Cheung Yin-tung, Kwong Chun-yu	10,069	2.5	N/A
ADPL	Tandon Lai Chaing, Yeung Chi-hang	6,771	1.7	−1.44
Independent	Chow Ping-tim	1,720	0.4	+0.03
Blue Intelligent Union	Leung Suet-fong, Thapa Komal	1,366	0.3	N/A
Nonpartisan	Yuen Wai-chung	1,338	0.3	N/A
Total valid votes		398,292	100.00	
Rejected ballots		2,427		
Turnout		400,719	42.49	−10.99
Registered electors		943,161		

== See also ==
- Legislative Council of Hong Kong
- Hong Kong legislative elections
- 2008 Hong Kong legislative election
