= 2004 Hong Kong legislative election in New Territories West =

- 12 September 2004

All 8 New Territories West seats to the Legislative Council
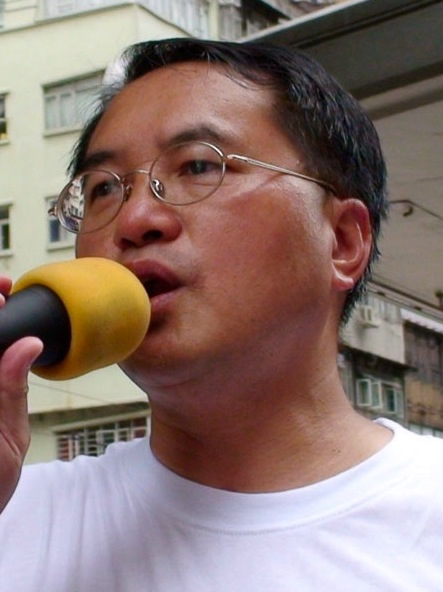

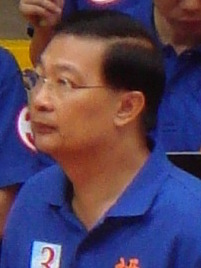

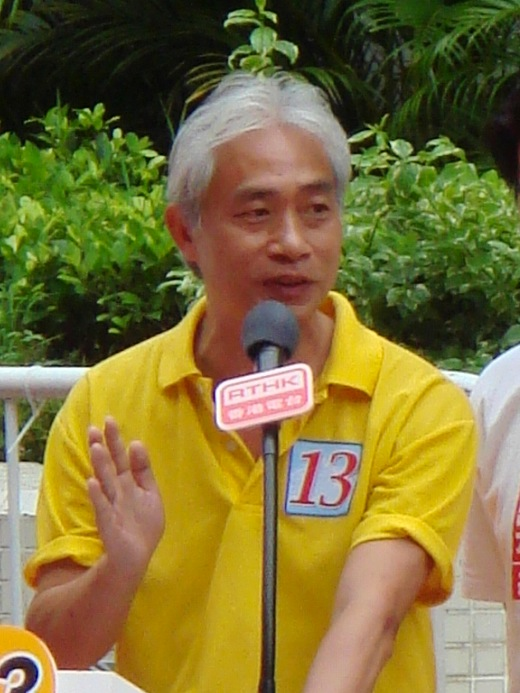

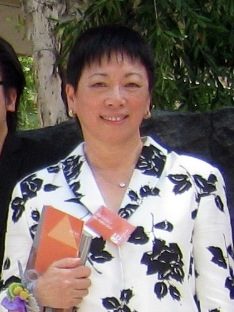

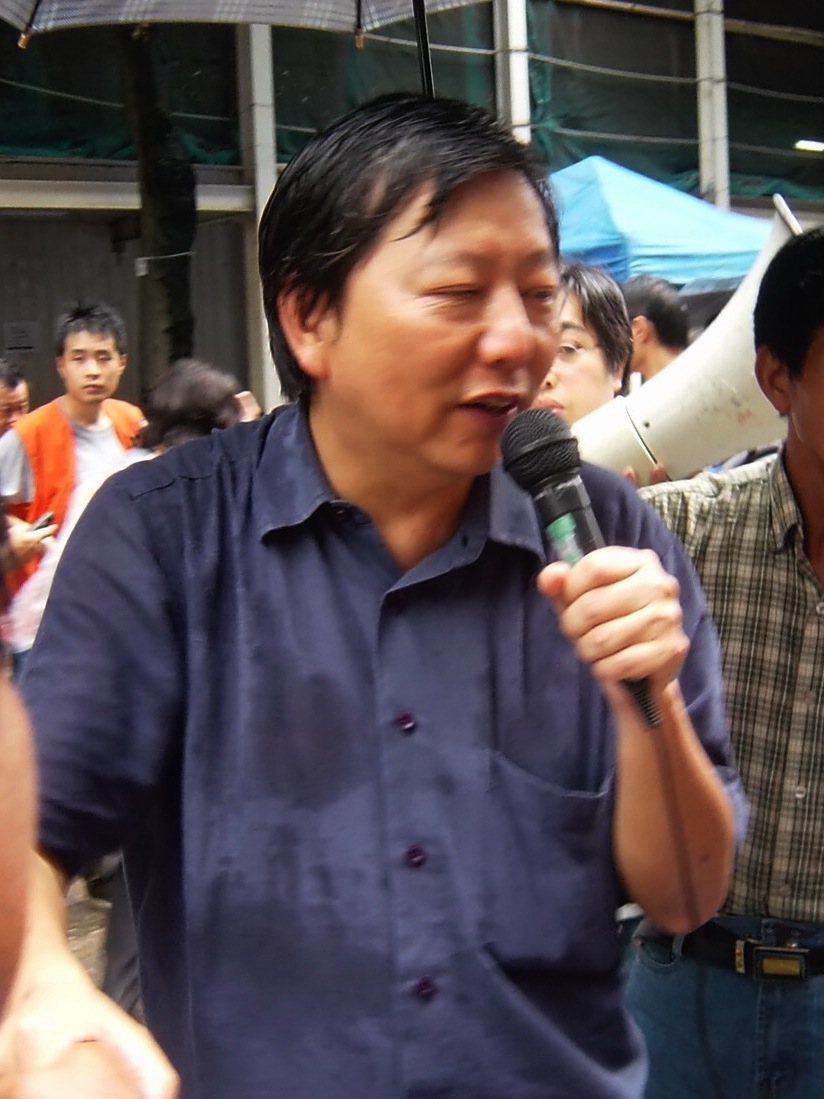

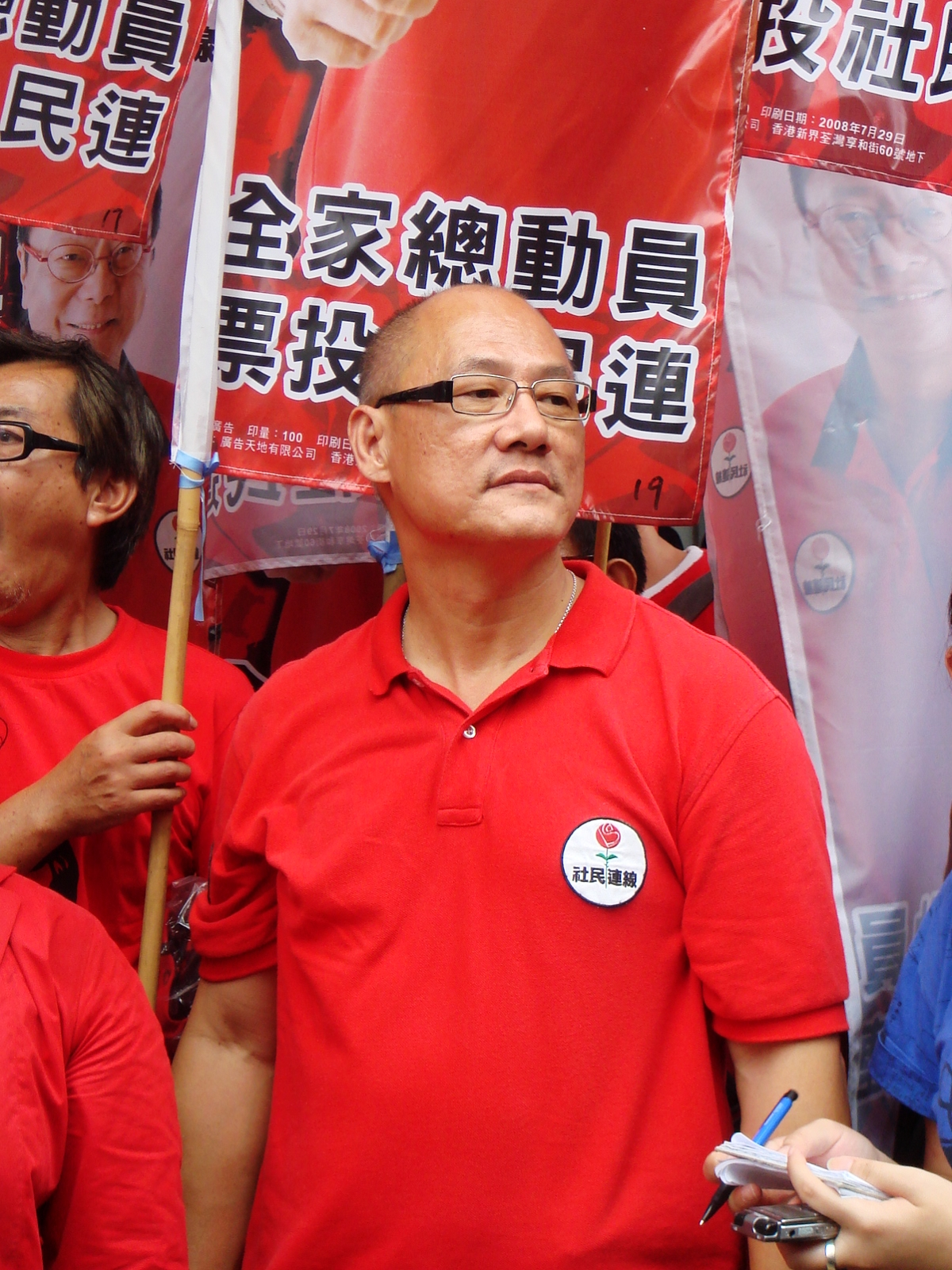
	First party	Second party	Third party
Leader	Lee Wing-tat & Albert Ho	Tam Yiu-chung	Leung Yiu-chung
Party	Democratic	DAB	NWSC
Alliance	Pro-democracy	Pro-Beijing	Pro-democracy
Last election	2 seats, 34.3%	2 seats, 29.6%	1 seat, 17.3%
Seats before	1	2	1
Seats won	2	2	1
Seat change	▲1	Steady	Steady
Popular vote	115,251	115,251	59,033
Percentage	26.9%	24.9%	12.7%
Swing	▼7.4%	▼4.7%	▼4.5%
	Fourth party	Fifth party	Sixth party
Leader	Selina Chow	Lee Cheuk-yan	Albert Chan
Party	Liberal	CTU	Independent
Alliance	Pro-Beijing	Pro-democracy	Pro-democracy
Last election	0 seat, 1.7%	1 seat, 15.2%	1 seat, 12.7%
Seats before	0	1	1
Seats won	1	1	1
Seat change	▲1	Steady	Steady
Popular vote	50,437	45,725	36,278
Percentage	10.9%	9.9%	7.8%
Swing	▲8.7%	▼5.3%	▼4.9%
- Party with most votes in each District Council Constituency.

These are the New Territories West results of the 2004 Hong Kong legislative election. The election was held on 12 September 2004 and all 8 seats in New Territories West, which consists of Tsuen Wan District, Tuen Mun District, Yuen Long District, Kwai Tsing District and Islands District, were contested. All the incumbents were elected with the new two seats gained by Lee Wing-tat of the Democratic Party and Selina Chow of the Liberal Party.

== Overall results ==
Before election:

↓
4	2
Pro-democracy	Pro-Beijing

Change in composition:

↓
5	3
Pro-democracy	Pro-Beijing

Party	Seats	Seats change	Contesting list(s)	Votes	%	% change
Democratic	2	+1	2	124,842	26.9	−7.4
NWSC	1	0	1	59,033	12.7	−4.5
CTU	1	0	1	45,725	9.9	−5.3
ADPL	0	0	1	14,570	3.1	N/A
Independent	1	0	1	36,278	7.8	N/A
Pro-democracy camp	5	0	6	280,448	60.5	–6.2
DAB	2	0	1	115,251	24.9	−4.7
Liberal	0	+1	1	50,437	10.9	+8.1
New Forum	0	0	1	4,511	1.0	N/A
Independent	0	0	1	1,725	0.4	N/A
Pro-Beijing camp	3	0	4	171,924	37.1	+4.8
Independent	0	0	2	11,036	2.4	N/A
Turnout:				463,408	53.5	

== Candidates list ==
Legislative Election 2004: New Territories West
List	Candidates	Votes	Of total (%)	± from prev.
DAB	Tam Yiu-chung, Cheung Hok-ming Leung Che-cheung, Au Yeung Po-chun, Tsui Fan, Chan Han-pan, Andy Lo Kwong-sing, Philip Ng King-wah	115,251	24.87 (12.5+12.37)	−4.71
Democratic	Lee Wing-tat Sumly Chan Yuen-sum	62,500	13.49 (12.5+0.99)	+3.11
Democratic	Ho Chun-yan Cheung Yin-tung	62,342	13.45 (12.5+0.95)	+2.25
NWSC	Leung Yiu-chung Andrew Wan Siu-kin	59,033	12.74 (12.5+0.24)	−4.53
Liberal	Selina Chow Liang Shuk-yee	50,437	10.88	+8.14
CTU	Lee Cheuk-yan Ip Ngok-fung	45,725	9.87	−5.32
Independent	Albert Chan Wai-yip	36,278	7.83	−4.86
ADPL	Yim Tim-sang, Kong Fung-yi, Tai Yin-chiu, Kwun Tung-wing	14,570	3.14	N/A
Nonpartisan	Stephen Char Shik-ngor	9,116	1.97	N/A
New Forum	Lui Hau-tuen, Siu Shing-choi, Chan Choi-hi	4,511	0.97	N/A
Nonpartisan	Ng Tak-leung	1,920	0.41	N/A
Independent	Chow Ping-tim	1,725	0.37	N/A
Total valid votes		463,408	100.00	
Rejected ballots		3,449		
Turnout		466,857	53.48	+9.75
Registered electors		873,031		

== See also ==
- Legislative Council of Hong Kong
- Hong Kong legislative elections
- 2004 Hong Kong legislative election
