= 2000 Hong Kong legislative election in New Territories West =

- 10 September 2000

All 6 New Territories West seats to the Legislative Council
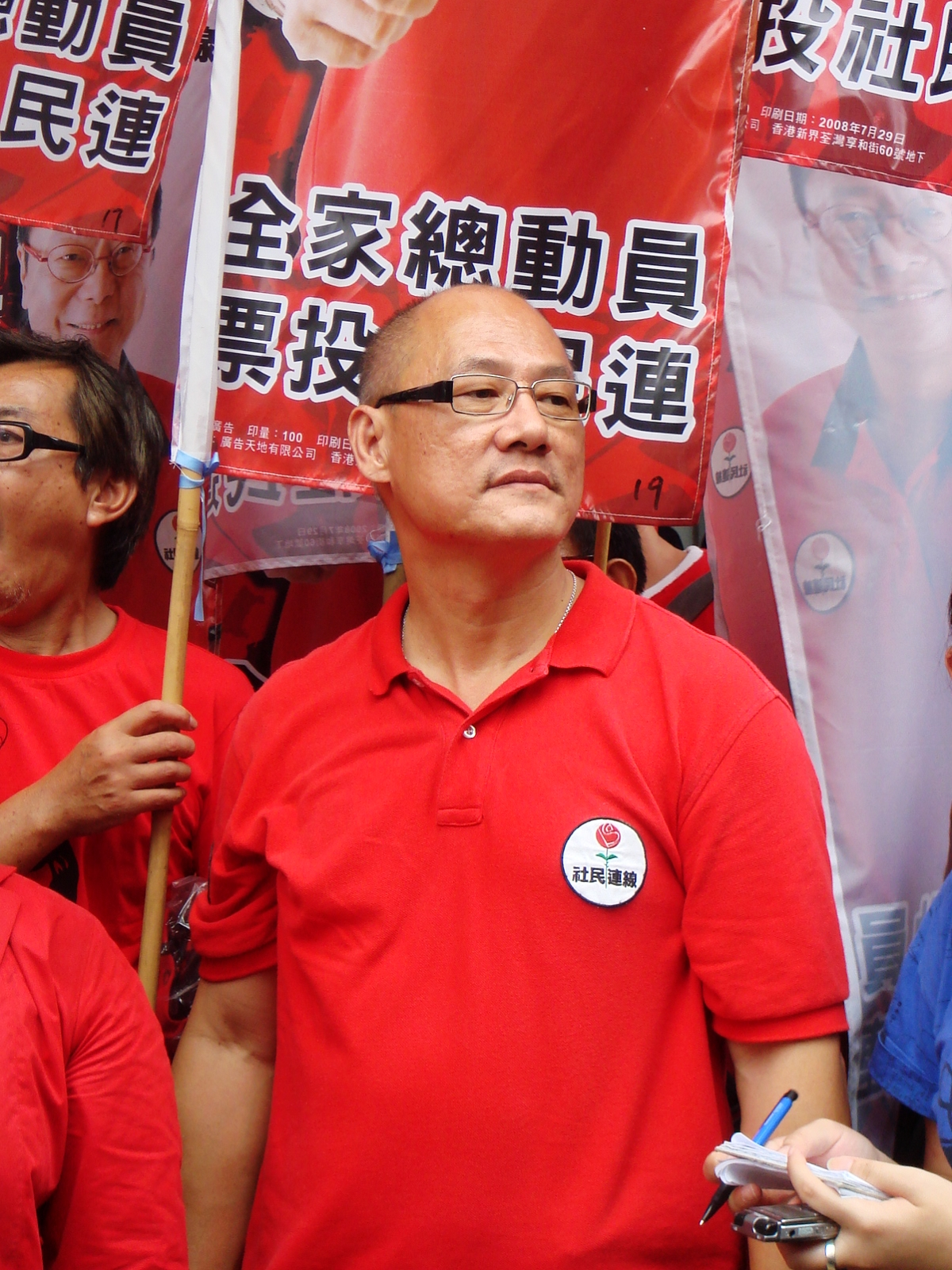

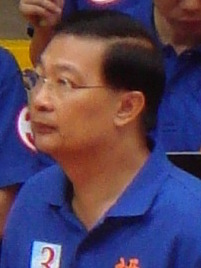

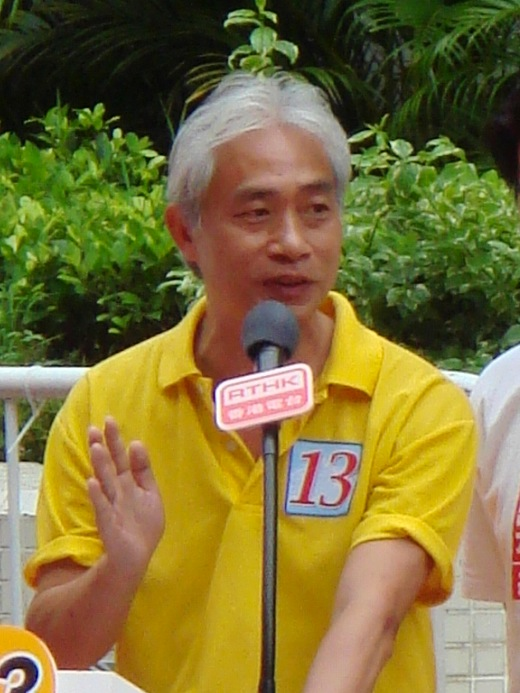

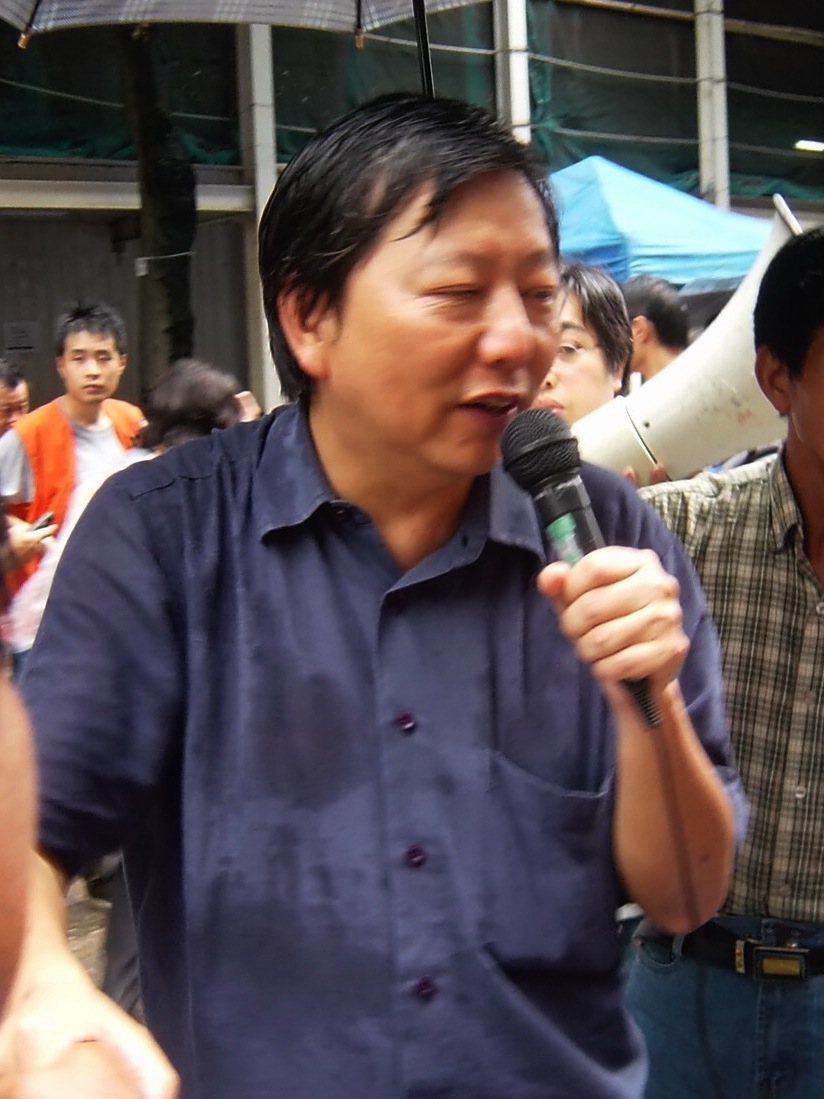
	First party	Second party
Leader	Albert Chan, Albert Ho & Lee Wing-tat	Tam Yiu-chung
Party	Democratic	DAB
Alliance	Pro-democracy	Pro-Beijing
Last election	2 seats, 39.2%	1 seat, 19.4%
Seats before	2	1
Seats won	2	2
Seat change	Steady	▲1
Popular vote	117,733	101,629
Percentage	34.3%	29.6%
Swing	▼4.9%	▲10.2%
	Third party	Fourth party
Leader	Leung Yiu-chung	Lee Cheuk-yan
Party	NWSC	CTU
Alliance	Pro-democracy	Pro-democracy
Last election	1 seat, 10.3%	1 seat, 12.5%
Seats before	1	1
Seats won	1	1
Seat change	Steady	Steady
Popular vote	59,348	52,202
Percentage	17.3%	15.2%
Swing	▲7.0%	▲2.7%

These are the New Territories West results of the 2000 Hong Kong legislative election. The election was held on 10 September 2000 and all 6 seats in New Territories West, which consists of Tsuen Wan District, Tuen Mun District, Yuen Long District, Kwai Tsing District and Islands District, were contested. The Democratic Party first applied electoral strategy of dividing three candidate lists in order to avoid wasted votes, as largest remainder method encouraged. Lee Wing-tat failed to be re-elected, losing votes to another Democratic ticket of Albert Chan, while the last seat was won by Tang Siu-tong of the Hong Kong Progressive Alliance who stood with the Democratic Alliance for the Betterment of Hong Kong ticket.

== Overall results ==
Before election:

↓
4	1
Pro-democracy	Pro-Beijing

Change in composition:

↓
4	2
Pro-democracy	Pro-Beijing

Party	Seats	Seats change	Contesting list(s)	Votes	%	% change
Democratic	2	0	3	117,733	34.3	−4.9
NWSC	1	0	1	59,348	17.3	+7.0
CTU	1	0	1	52,202	15.2	+2.7
Pro-democracy camp	4	0	5	229,283	66.7	–4.5
DAB	2	+1	1	101,629	29.6	+10.2
Liberal	0	0	1	9,408	2.7	+1.9
Pro-Beijing camp	2	0	2	111,037	32.3	+3.5
Independent	0	0	1	3,274	1.0	N/A
Turnout:				343,594	43.7	

== Candidates list ==
Legislative Election 2000: New Territories West
List	Candidates	Votes	Of total (%)	± from prev.
DAB (HKPA)	Tam Yiu-chung, Tang Siu-tong Leung Che-cheung, Chau Chuen-heung, Chan Yau-hoi, Au Yeung Po-chun	101,629	29.58 (16.67+12.91)	+10.23
NWSC	Leung Yiu-chung	59,348	17.27	+6.97
CTU (Frontier)	Lee Cheuk-yan	52,202	15.19	+2.74
Democratic	Albert Chan Wai-yip Cosmas Kwong Kwok-chuen	43,613	12.69	N/A
Democratic	Ho Chun-yan Josephine Chan Shu-ying, Cheung Yuet-lan, Catherine Wong Lai-sheung	38,472	11.20	N/A
Democratic	Lee Wing-tat, Wong Bing-kuen	35,648	10.38	N/A
Liberal	David Yeung Fuk-kwong	9,408	2.74	+1.9
Nonpartisan	Angela Man Yun-fei	3,274	0.95	N/A
Total valid votes		343,594	100.00	
Rejected ballots		2,663		
Turnout		346,257	43.73	−9.52
Registered electors		791,746		

== See also ==
- Legislative Council of Hong Kong
- Hong Kong legislative elections
- 2000 Hong Kong legislative election
