= 2016 Hong Kong legislative election in New Territories West =

- 4 September 2016

All 9 New Territories West seats to the Legislative Council
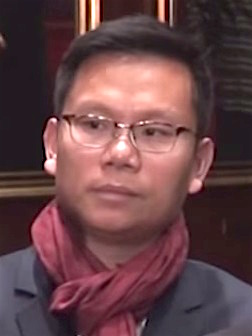

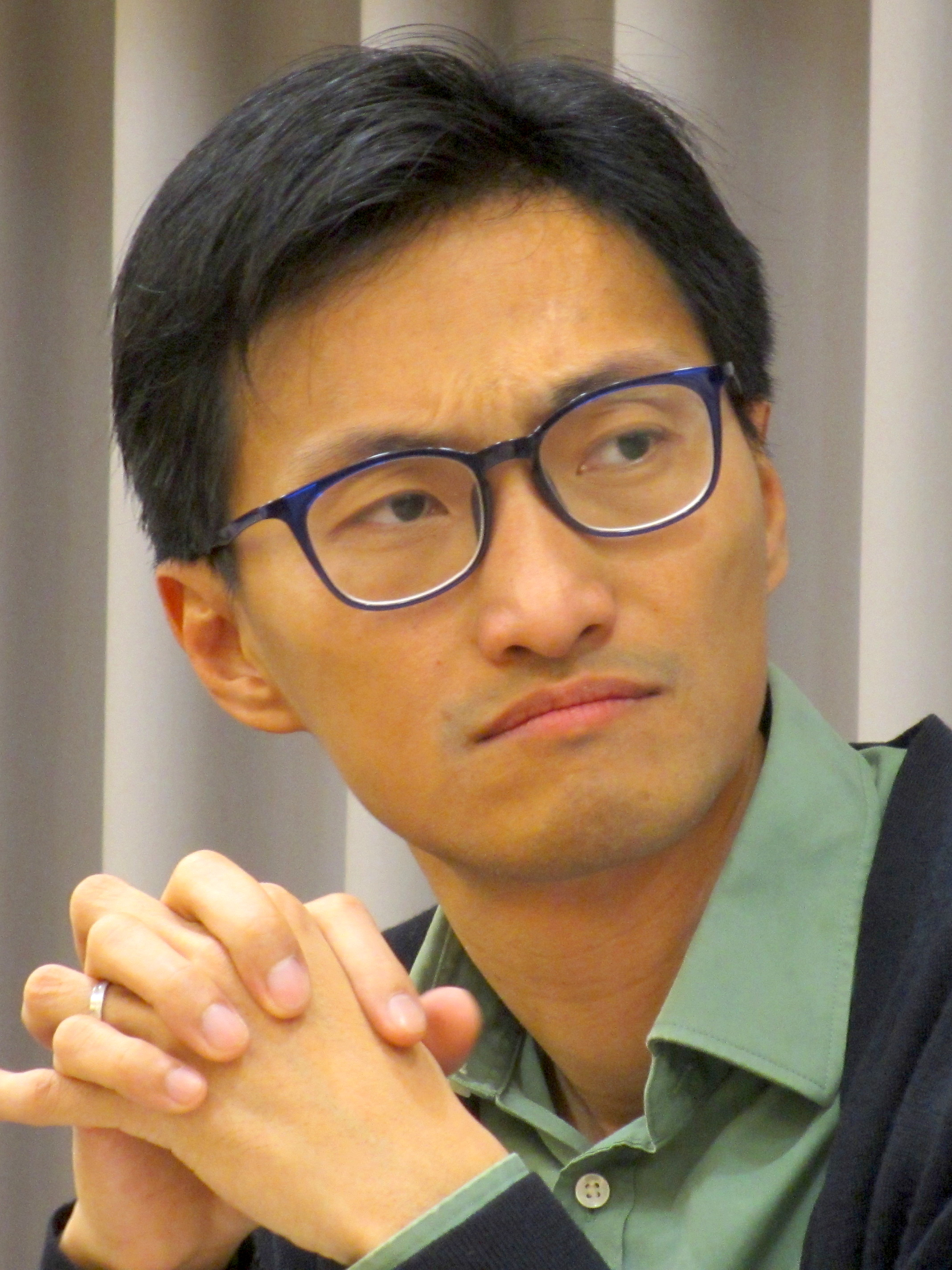

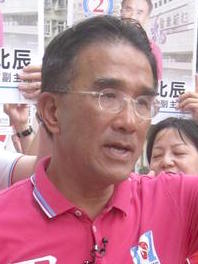

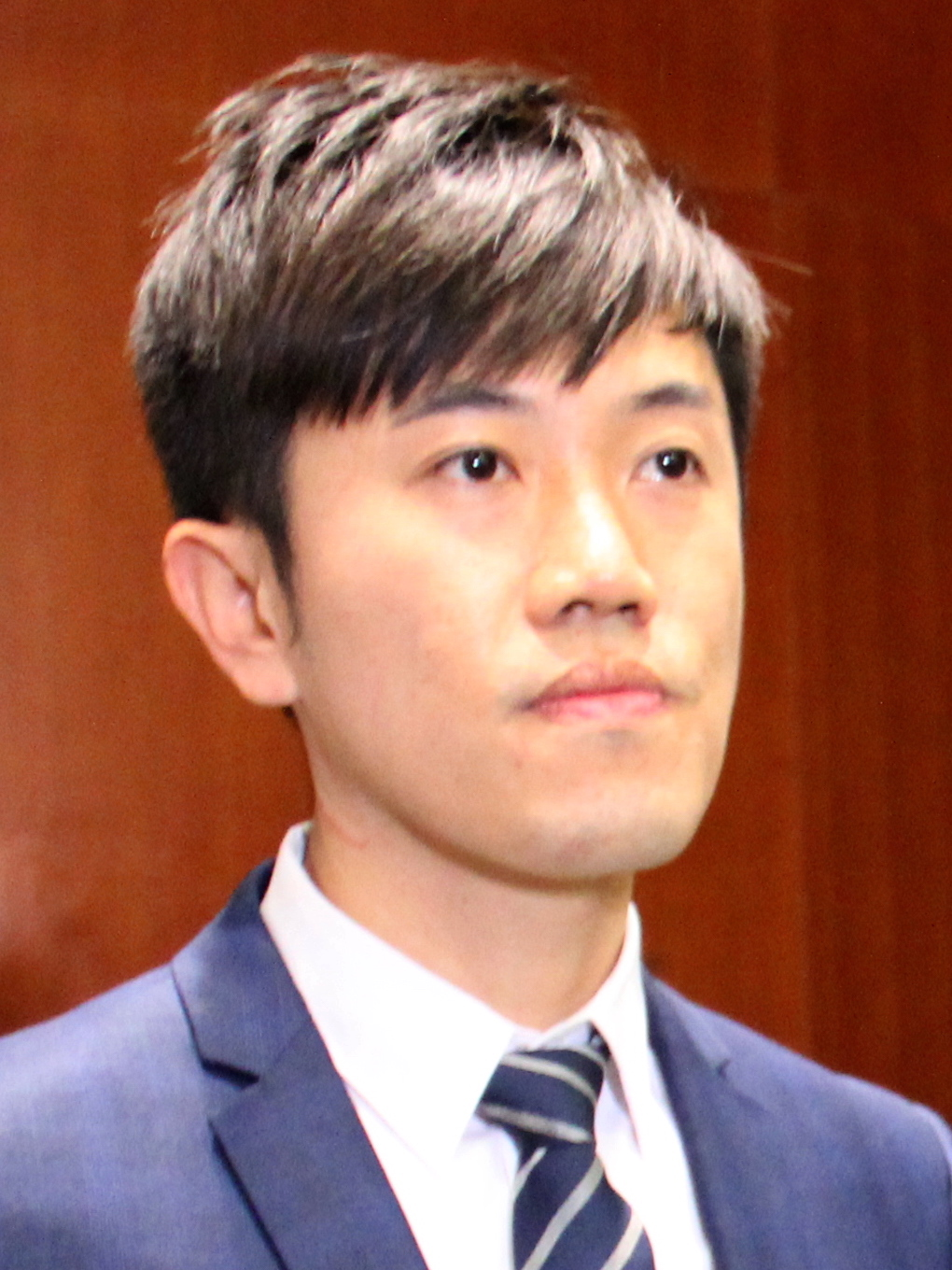

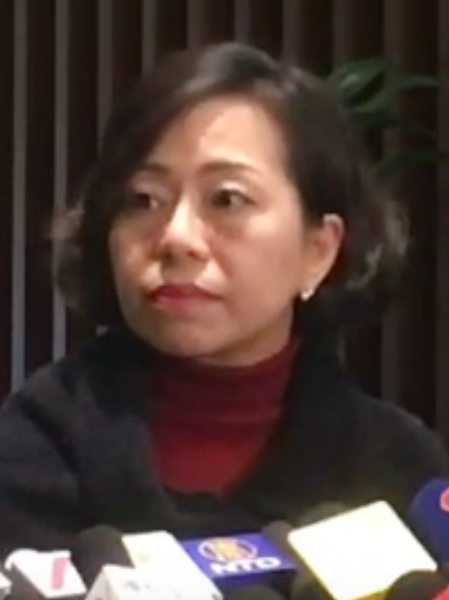

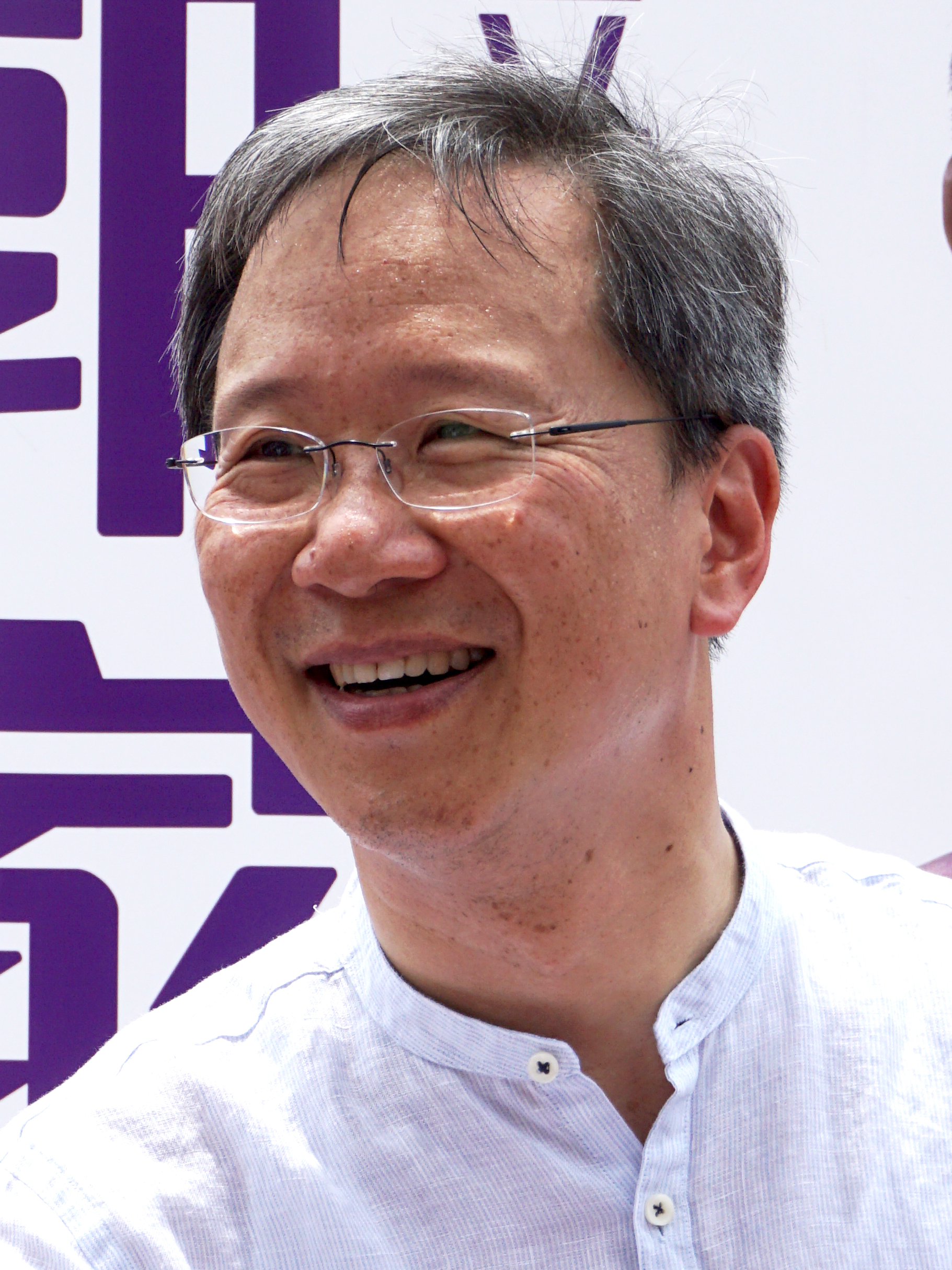

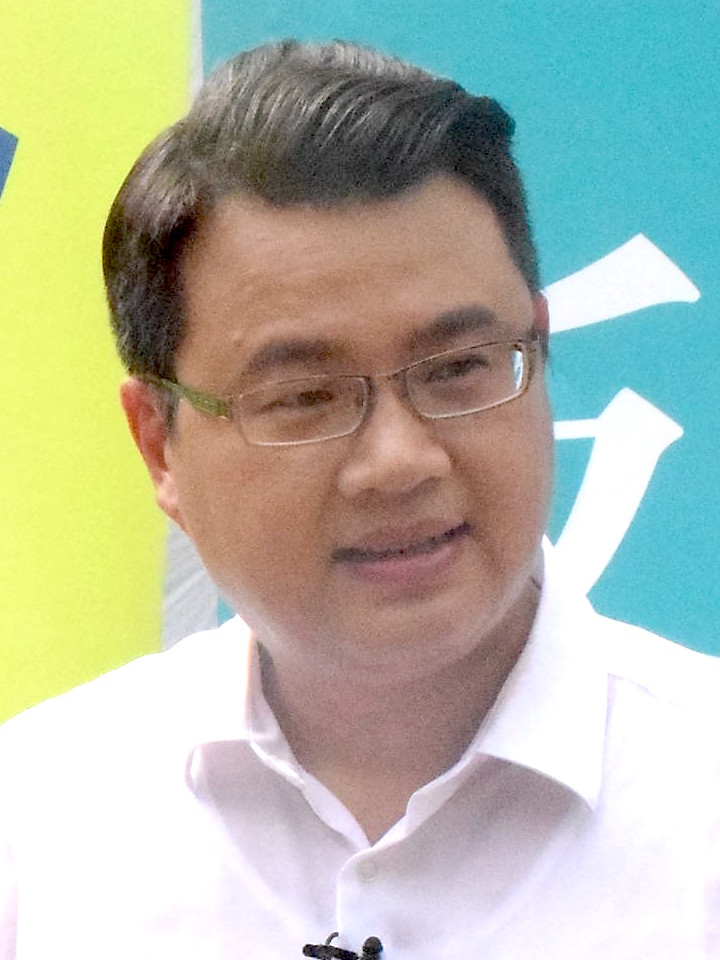

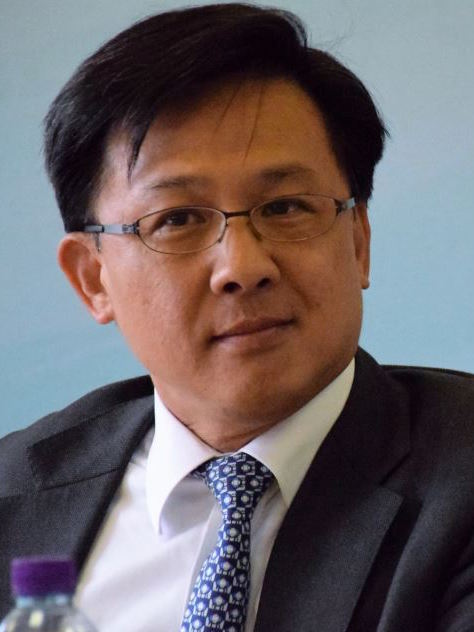

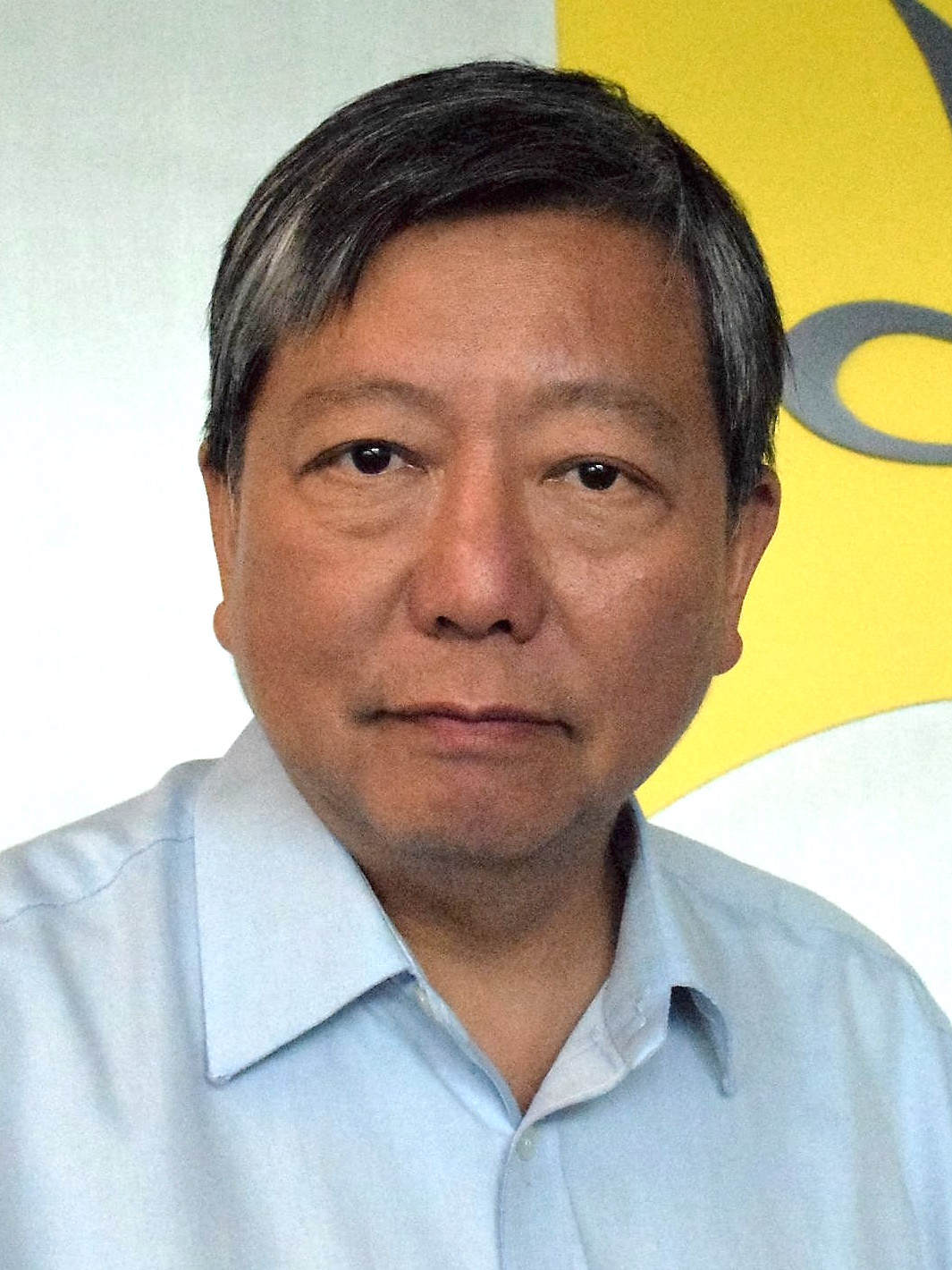
	First party	Second party	Third party
Leader	Ben Chan & Leung Che-cheung	Eddie Chu	Michael Tien
Party	DAB	Independent	NPP
Alliance	Pro-Beijing	N/A	Pro-Beijing
Last election	2 seats, 22.8%	No seat	1 seat, 7.6%
Seats before	3	0	1
Seats won	2	1	1
Seat change	▼1	▲1	Steady
Popular vote	108,863	84,121	70,646
Percentage	18.0%	13.9%	11.7%
Swing	▼4.8%	N/A	▲4.1%
	Fourth party	Fifth party	Sixth party
Leader	Cheng Chung-tai	Alice Mak	Kwok Ka-ki
Party	Civic Passion	FTU	Civic
Alliance	CP–PPI–HKRO	Pro-Beijing	Pan-democracy
Last election	New party	1 seat, 7.1%	1 seat, 14.5%
Seats before	0	1	1
Seats won	1	1	1
Seat change	▲1	Steady	Steady
Popular vote	54,496	49,680	42,334
Percentage	9.0%	8.2%	7.0%
Swing	N/A	▲1.2%	▼7.5%
	Seventh party	Eighth party	Ninth party
Leader	Andrew Wan	Junius Ho	Lee Cheuk-yan
Party	Democratic	Independent	Labour
Alliance	Pan-democracy	Pro-Beijing	Pan-democracy
Last election	0 seat, 11.8%	0 seat, 2.2%	1 seat, 8.2%
Seats before	0	0	1
Seats won	1	1	0
Seat change	▲1	▲1	▼1
Popular vote	41,704	35,657	35,657
Percentage	6.9%	5.9%	5.0%
Swing	▼4.9%	▲3.7%	▼3.2%
- Party with most votes in each District Council Constituency.

These are the New Territories West results of the 2016 Hong Kong Legislative Council election. The election was held on 4 September 2016 and all 9 seats in New Territories West, which consists of Tsuen Wan District, Tuen Mun District, Yuen Long District, Kwai Tsing District and Islands District, were contested. Veteran social activist Eddie Chu received the highest votes of 84,121, 14 per cent of the vote share, in all geographical constituencies. The Democratic Party retook one seat after it was ousted in the previous election with newcomer Andrew Wan, while independent lawyer Junius Ho who was backed by the Liaison Office won the last seat by defeating pro-democracy heavyweight Labour Party's Lee Cheuk-yan. Localist group Civic Passion's Cheng Chung-tai also won the only seat for the CP–PPI–HKRO electoral alliance.

== Overall results ==
Before election:

↓
4	5
Anti-establishment	Pro-establishment

Change in composition:

↓
4	5
Anti-establishment	Pro-establishment

Party	Seats	Seats change	Contesting list(s)	Votes	%	% change
DAB	2	–1	2	108,863	18.0	−4.8
NPP	1	0	1	70,646	11.7	+4.1
FTU	1	0	1	49,680	8.2	+1.2
Liberal	0	0	1	1,469	0.2	N/A
Politihk SS	0	0	1	604	0.1	N/A
Independent	1	+1	2	36,467	6.0	N/A
Pro-Beijing camp	5	0	8	267,769	44.4	+1.4
Civic	1	0	1	42,334	7.0	–7.5
Democratic	1	+1	1	41,704	6.9	−4.9
Labour	0	–1	1	30,149	5.0	−3.2
LSD/PP	0	–1	1	28,529	4.7	–6.0
NWSC	0	–1	1	20,974	3.5	−5.3
ADPL	0	0	1	17,872	3.0	N/A
Independent	0	0	1	2,408	0.4	N/A
Pro-democracy camp	2	–2	7	183,970	30.5	−14.1
Civic Passion	1	+1	1	54,496	9.0	N/A
Youngspiration	0	0	1	9,928	1.7	N/A
Christians to the World	0	0	1	812	0.1	N/A
Independent	1	+1	1	84,121	14.0	N/A
Localist groups	2	+2	4	149,357	24.8	
Independent	0	0	1	2,390	0.4	N/A
Turnout:				603,446	56.4	+5.1

== Candidates list ==
Vote share
1. DAB (18.0%)
2. NPP (11.7%)
3. Civic Passion (9.03%)
4. FTU (8.23%)
5. Civic (7.02%)
6. Democratic (6.91%)
7. Labour (5.00%)
8. LSD/PP (4.73%)
9. NWSC (3.48%)
10. ADPL (3.36%)
11. Youngspiration (1.65%)
12. Liberal (0.24%)
13. Christians to the World (0.14%)
14. Politihk SS (0.14%)
15. Other (20.3%)

Legislative Election 2016: New Territories West
List	Candidates	Votes	Of total (%)	± from prev.
Nonpartisan	Eddie Chu Hoi-dick	84,121	13.94 (11.11+2.83)	N/A
NPP	Michael Tien Puk-sun Wilson Wong Wai-shun, So Ka-man, Tsui Hiu-kit, Kam Man-fung, Cheng Chit-pun, Sammi Fu Hiu-lam	70,646	11.71 (11.11+0.60)	–4.13
DAB	Chan Han-pan Kwok Fu-ying, Lai Sai-lung, Leung Kar-ming, Chan Chun-chung, Lui Dik-ming, Pau Ming-hong	58,673	9.72	+2.39
Civic Passion	Cheng Chung-tai Cheung Yiu-sum	54,496	9.03	N/A
DAB (NTAS)	Leung Che-cheung Liu Kin, Ken Wong Hon-kuen, Yip Man-pan, Chiu Kwan-siu, Lai Ka-man	50,190	8.32	–0.40
FTU	Alice Mak Mei-kuen Yiu Kwok-wai, Kot Siu-yuen, Fung Pui-yin, Lau Chin-pang	49,680	8.23	+1.16
Civic	Kwok Ka-ki Sin Ho-fai	42,334	7.02	–7.46
Democratic	Andrew Wan Siu-kin Ho Chun-yan, Lee Wing-tat, Catherine Wong Lai-sheung, Lam Siu-fai	41,704	6.91	–4.86
Independent	Ho Kwan-yiu	35,657	5.91	+3.74
Labour	Lee Cheuk-yan, Chiu Yan-loy	30,149	5.00	–3.22
LSD (People Power)	Wong Ho-ming, Albert Chan Wai-yip	28,529	4.73	–6.03
NWSC	Wong Yun-tat, Leung Ching-shan, Rayman Chow Wai-hung	20,974	3.48	–5.30
ADPL	Frederick Fung Kin-kee	17,872	2.96	N/A
Youngspiration (TSWNF)	Wong Chun-kit, Wong Pak-yu	9,928	1.65	N/A
Nonpartisan	Tong Wing-chi	2,408	0.40	N/A
Nonpartisan	Clarice Cheung Wai-ching	2,390	0.40	N/A
Liberal	Chow Wing-kan	1,469	0.24	N/A
Christians to the World	Hendrick Lui Chi-hang	812	0.13	N/A
Nonpartisan	Kwong Koon-wan	810	0.13	N/A
Politihk SS	Ko Chi-fai, Innes Tang Tak-shing	604	0.10	N/A
Total valid votes		603,446	100	
Rejected ballots		9,624		
Turnout		613,070	56.43	+5.14
Registered electors		1,086,515		

== See also ==
- Legislative Council of Hong Kong
- Hong Kong legislative elections
- 2016 Hong Kong legislative election
