= Lei Muk Shue East (constituency) =

- Elected constituency for the Tsuen Wan District Council
- Boundary of Lei Muk Shue East in Tsuen Wan District
- District: Tsuen Wan
- Legislative Council constituency: New Territories South West
- Population: 17,322 (2019)
- Electorate: 10,857 (2019)

Current constituency
- Created: 1999
- Number of members: One
- Member: Sumly Chan (Independent)
- Created from: Lei Shue

Lei Muk Shue East is one of the 17 constituencies of the Tsuen Wan District Council. It covers the east part of Lei Muk Shue Estate and the rural villages at the west of Wo Yee Hop Road. The seat elects one member of the council every four years. Prior to its creation in 1999, the seat has continuously been held by Sumly Chan Yuen-sum of Civic Party since 1985.

== Councillors represented ==
| Election | Member | Party |
|---|---|---|
| 1999 | Sumly Chan Yuen-sum | Independent |
| 2003 | Sumly Chan Yuen-sum | Independent→Democratic→Civic |
| 2007 | Sumly Chan Yuen-sum | Civic |
| 2011 | Sumly Chan Yuen-sum | Civic |
| 2015 | Sumly Chan Yuen-sum | Civic |
| 2019 | Sumly Chan Yuen-sum | Civic→Independent |

== Election results ==
=== 2010s ===
Tsuen Wan District Council Election, 2019: Lei Muk Shue East
| Party | Candidate | Votes | % | ±% |
|---|---|---|---|---|
| Civic | Sumly Chan Yuen-sum | 5,214 | 68.11 | +4.01 |
| DAB (FTU) | Lam Hin-fai | 2,441 | 31.89 | −4.01 |
| Majority | | 2,773 | 36.22 | |
| Turnout | | 7,681 | 70.79 | |
| Civic hold | | Swing | | |

Tsuen Wan District Council Election, 2015: Lei Muk Shue East
| Party | Candidate | Votes | % | ±% |
|---|---|---|---|---|
| Civic | Sumly Chan Yuen-sum | 3,169 | 64.1 | +5.1 |
| DAB | Lui Dik-ming | 1,773 | 35.9 | –3.4 |
| Majority | | 1,396 | 28.2 | +8.5 |
| Turnout | | 4,962 | 54.9 | |
| Civic hold | | Swing | +4.3 | |

Tsuen Wan District Council Election, 2011: Lei Muk Shue East
| Party | Candidate | Votes | % | ±% |
|---|---|---|---|---|
| Civic | Sumly Chan Yuen-sum | 2,761 | 59.03 | −12.03 |
| DAB | Lui Dik-ming | 1,839 | 39.32 | |
| Nonpartisan | Chau Wai-yee | 77 | 1.65 | |
| Majority | | 922 | 19.71 | |
| Civic hold | | Swing | | |

=== 2000s ===
Tsuen Wan District Council Election, 2007: Lei Muk Shue East
| Party | Candidate | Votes | % | ±% |
|---|---|---|---|---|
| Civic | Sumly Chan Yuen-sum | 1,994 | 71.09 | |
| Independent | Lam Kam-wing | 811 | 28.91 | |
| Majority | | | | |
| Civic hold | | Swing | | |

Tsuen Wan District Council Election, 2003: Lei Muk Shue East
| Party | Candidate | Votes | % | ±% |
|---|---|---|---|---|
| Independent | Sumly Chan Yuen-sum | 1,945 | 75.33 | |
| Nonpartisan | Lee Chun-po | 637 | 24.67 | |
| Majority | | | | |
| Independent hold | | Swing | | |

=== 1990s ===
Tsuen Wan District Council Election, 1999: Lei Muk Shue East
| Party | Candidate | Votes | % | ±% |
|---|---|---|---|---|
| Independent | Sumly Chan Yuen-sum | 1,404 | 67.50 | |
| Nonpartisan | Hui Po-chun | 676 | 32.50 | |
| Independent win (new seat) | | | | |
