= Kwai Fong Estate =

Public housing estate in Kwai Chung, Hong Kong

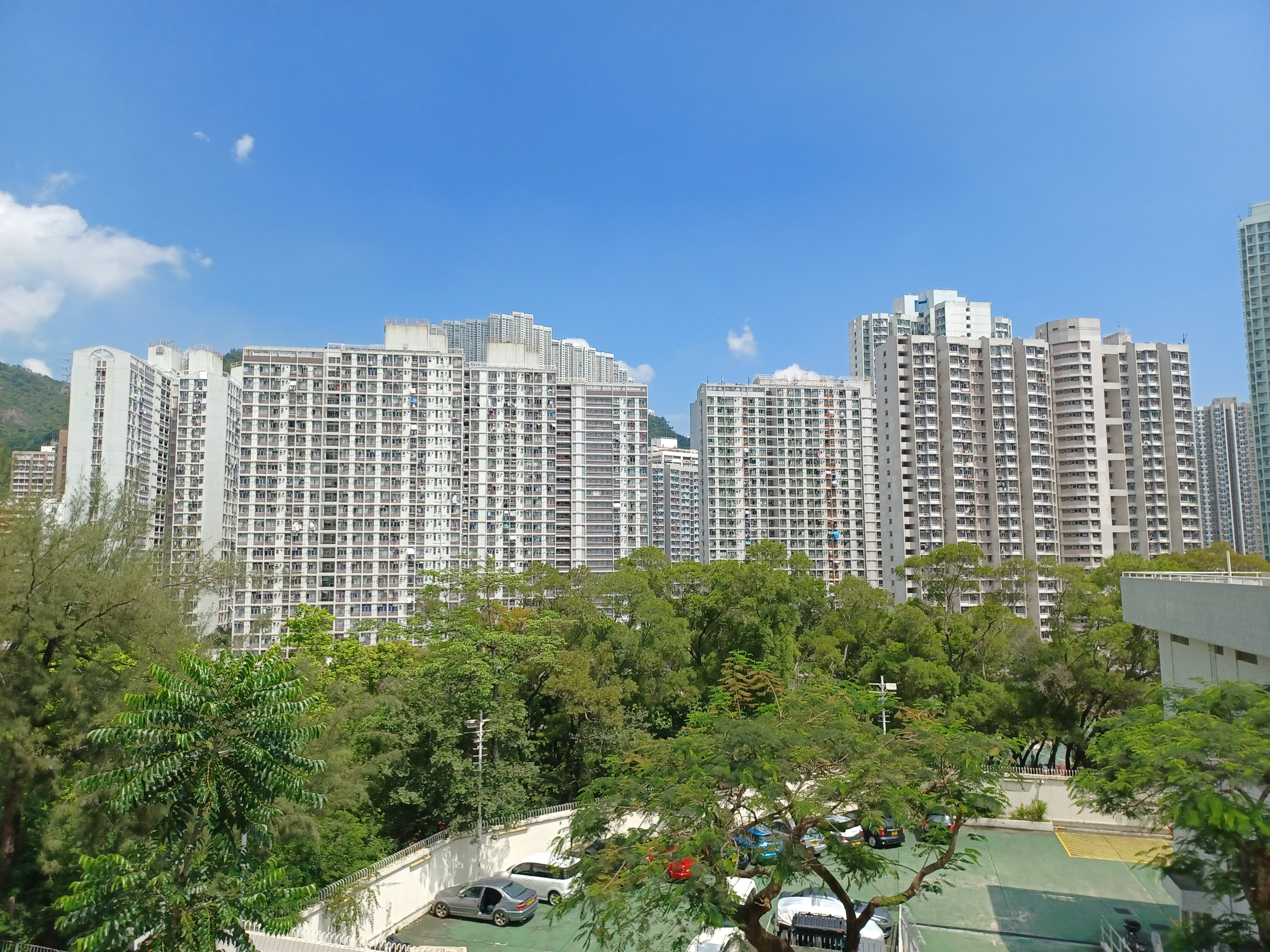
- Kwai Fong Estate
- Interactive map of Kwai Fong Estate

General information
- Location: 177 Hing Fong Road, Kwai Chung; New Territories, Hong Kong
- Coordinates: 22.36012°N 114.12852°E
- Status: Completed
- Category: Public rental housing
- Population: 18,023 (2016)
- No. of blocks: 12
- No. of units: 6,449

Construction
- Constructed: 1971; 55 years ago (Before reconstruction); 1987; 39 years ago (After reconstruction)
- Authority: Hong Kong Housing Authority

Kwai Fong Estate (Chinese: 葵芳邨) is a public housing estate in Kwai Fong, Kwai Chung, New Territories, Hong Kong. It was built in the reclaimed land of Gin Drinkers Bay, later the town centre of Kwai Chung, south of Kwai Hing Estate. Kwai Fong station is named after the name of the estate. It comprises twelve buildings with a total of 6,400 units and a shopping arcade.

== Background ==
Before redevelopment, it consisted of 11 buildings which were completed between 1971 and 1973. In 1982, the buildings were revealed to have structural defects. In 1985, the HKHA announced that the strength of the concrete in blocks 8, 9, 10 and 11 of Kwai Fong Estate was below standard. Those blocks were demolished between 1985 and 1989. Other old buildings were also demolished in the 1990s to cope with the estate redevelopment. The estate was later redeveloped with 12 new buildings built between 1987 and 2002.

== Houses ==
Name	Chinese name	Building type	Completed
Kwai Yan House	葵仁樓	New Slab	1987
Kwai Chi House	葵智樓	Linear 1	1987
Kwai Tak House	葵德樓	Linear 1	1991
Kwai Shun House	葵信樓	Linear 3	1991
Kwai On House	葵安樓	Linear 3	1990
Kwai Kin House	葵健樓	Harmony 3	1993
Kwai Ming House	葵明樓	Harmony 1	1996
Kwai Ching House	葵正樓	Harmony 1	1996
Kwai Tai House	葵泰樓	Harmony 1	1998
Kwai Oi House	葵愛樓	Single Aspect Building	2000
Kwai Foon House	葵歡樓	New Cruciform (Ver.1999)	2002
Kwai Hei House	葵喜樓	New Cruciform (Ver.1999)	2002

== Demographics ==
According to the 2016 by-census, Kwai Fong Estate had a population of 18,023. The median age was 46.8 and the majority of residents (94.2 per cent) were of Chinese ethnicity. The average household size was 2.9 people. The median monthly household income of all households (i.e. including both economically active and inactive households) was HK$22,540.

== Politics ==
Kwai Fong Estate is located in Kwai Fong constituency of the Kwai Tsing District Council. It was formerly represented by Leung Yiu-chung, who was elected in the 2019 elections until February 2021.

== See also ==
- Public housing estates in Kwai Chung
