= Kwai Fong (constituency) =

Hong Kong constituency

- Elected constituency for the Kwai Tsing District Council
- Boundary of Kwai Fong in Kwai Tsing District
- District: Kwai Tsing
- Legislative Council constituency: New Territories South West
- Population: 18,107 (2019)
- Electorate: 11,414 (2019)

Current constituency
- Created: 1994
- Number of members: One
- Member: vacant

Kwai Fong (Chinese: 葵芳) is one of the 29 constituencies of the Kwai Tsing District, returning one member to the Kwai Tsing District Council every four years. It was first created in 1994, and the seat has been held by Leung Yiu-chung of the Neighbourhood and Worker's Service Centre ever since.

Loosely based on Kwai Fong Estate and the Tai Lin Pai industrial area, the constituency has an estimated population of 18,107 as of 2019.

== Councillors represented ==
Election	Member	Party
1994	Leung Yiu-chung	NWSC
1999	Leung Yiu-chung	NWSC
2003	Leung Yiu-chung	NWSC
2007	Leung Yiu-chung	NWSC
2011	Leung Yiu-chung	NWSC
2015	Leung Yiu-chung	NWSC
2019	Leung Yiu-chung→Vacant (Note: Unseated on 26 February 2021 after being convicted for illegal assembly on 18 August 2019.)	NWSC

== Election results ==
=== 2010s ===
Kwai Tsing District Council Election, 2019: Kwai Fong
Party	Candidate	Votes	%	±%
NWSC	Leung Yiu-chung	4,766	59.10	−7.90
DAB	Lam Ying-wai	2,997	37.17	
Nonpartisan	Tsang Tsz-lun	301	3.73	
Majority		1,769	21.93	
Turnout		8,059	70.66	
NWSC hold		Swing		

Kwai Tsing District Council Election, 2015: Kwai Fong
Party	Candidate	Votes	%	±%
NWSC	Leung Yiu-chung	3,301	67.0	–24.1
FLU	Chan Man-luen-ying	1,624	33.0	
Majority		1,677	34.0	–48.1
Turnout		4,976	47.9	
NWSC hold		Swing		

Kwai Tsing District Council Election, 2011: Kwai Fong
Party	Candidate	Votes	%	±%
NWSC	Leung Yiu-chung	3,944	91.1	+4.4
Green Party	Chan Wing-lai	387	8.9	
Majority		3,557	82.1	+8.8
NWSC hold		Swing		

=== 2000s ===
Kwai Tsing District Council Election, 2007: Kwai Fong
Party	Candidate	Votes	%	±%
NWSC	Leung Yiu-chung	3,858	86.7	+2.8
South Brook	Leung Suet-fong	594	13.3	
Majority		3,264	73.3	+0.9
NWSC hold		Swing		

Kwai Tsing District Council Election, 2003: Kwai Fong
Party	Candidate	Votes	%	±%
NWSC	Leung Yiu-chung	4,517	83.8	+22.0
DAB	Ng Sing-hung	615	11.4	–26.8
Nonpartisan	Lui King-wing	257	4.7	
Majority		3,902	72.4	+48.9
NWSC hold		Swing	+24.4	

=== 1990s ===
Kwai Tsing District Council Election, 1999: Kwai Fong
Party	Candidate	Votes	%	±%
NWSC	Leung Yiu-chung	2,885	61.8	
DAB	Chan Yung	1,785	38.2	
Majority		1,100	23.6	
NWSC hold		Swing		

Kwai Tsing District Board Election, 1994: Kwai Fong
Party	Candidate	Votes	%	±%
NWSC	Leung Yiu-chung	uncontested		
NWSC win (new seat)				
