= Sumly Chan =

- 陳琬琛
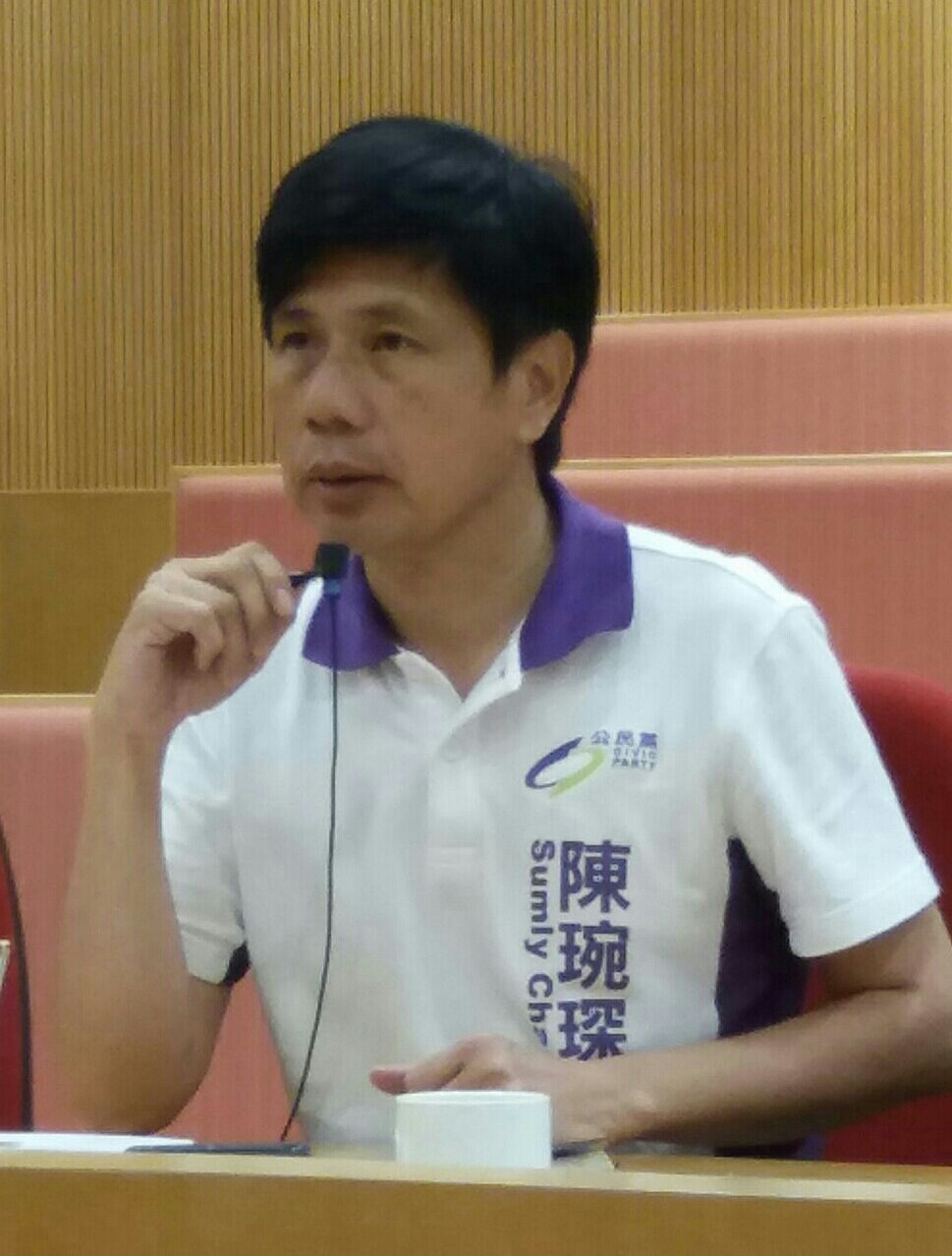
- Sumly Chan in District Council 2016

Tsuen Wan District Council
- Incumbent
- Assumed office 1991
- Preceded by: New constituency
- Constituency: Lei Muk Shue Estate East
- In office 1985–1991
- Preceded by: Ho Mun
- Succeeded by: Office abolished

4th Chairman of the New Territories West Branch of Civic Party
- In office 2011–2012
- Preceded by: Yip Dak Lun
- Succeeded by: So Yiu Kwan

Civic Party District Council (Second) Election Nominee
- In office 2016
- Preceded by: New title

Personal details
- Born: Sumly Chan Yuen-sum; March 23, 1958 (age 67) British Hong Kong
- Party: Democratic Party (2004-2007) Civic Party (2007-)
- Occupation: District Councillor
- Profession: Social Worker
- Known for: Politician

Sumly Chan
- Traditional Chinese: 陳琬琛
- Simplified Chinese: 陈琬琛
Transcriptions
Standard Mandarin
- Hanyu Pinyin: Chén Wǎnchēn
Yue: Cantonese
- Jyutping: can4 jyun2 sam1

Sumly Chan Yuen-sum (born 23 March 1958 in Hong Kong) is a social worker and politician in Hong Kong, a member of the Civic Party, the chairman and the member of Tsuen Wan District Council (Lei Muk Shue East). He has served as district councillor in Tsuen Wan since 1985 and is one of the Hong Kong district councillors with the longest years of service.

== Political Life ==
=== Democratic Party ===
In 2003, Chan claimed the name of "Tsuen Wan Election Union" headed by Albert Chan to take part in the District Council election, and renewed the seat successfully. In 2004, he joined Hong Kong Democratic Party and partnered with Lee Wing-tat, the former chairman of the Democratic Party to participate in the 2004 Hong Kong legislative election, but failed to enter the Legislative Council. In September 2007, he quit Democratic Party and joined Civic Party.

=== Civic Party ===
In November 2007, he succeeded in keeping the seat of the district council. In 2008, Fernando Cheung and Chan represented Civic Party to participate in the 2008 Hong Kong legislative election, but both Cheung and he lost.
In 2016, he was nominated by Civic Party to run for the District Council (Second) constituency. He spent plenty of time in finding his 15 nominees (they must be a district councillor) which caused him to start his campaign later than others. As a result, he was constantly ranked either sixth or seventh in the rolling poll which caused him to suspend his campaign on 2 September 2016 in order to have at least three pan-democrats to take the District Council (Second) seat. Leung Yiu-chung, who was then elected in the District Council (Second) election was somehow actually helped by Sumly. Sumly was meant to have 16 nominees with him. However, one of them is duplicated with Leung. Therefore, Sumly decided to forfeit it in order to let Leung enter the race.

Preceded by Ho Mun	Tsuen Wan District Councilor (Tsuen Wan South); 1985－1991	Office abolished
New constituency	Tsuen Wan District Councilor (Lei Muk Shue East); 1991－	Incumbent
Preceded by Yip Dak Lun	Chairman of the Civic Party New Territories West branch 2011－2012	Succeeded by So Yiu Kwan
New title	Civic Party District Council (Second) Election Nominee; 2016	Incumbent
