= District Council (Second) =

Functional constituency of Hong Kong

District Council (Second) 區議會（第二）
- Former Functional constituency for the Legislative Council of Hong Kong
- Country: Hong Kong
- Electorate: 4,196,680 (2020)

Former constituency
- Created: 2012
- Abolished: 2021
- Number of members: Five
- Members: Last: Starry Lee (DAB); Holden Chow (DAB); Vacant (3)

The District Council (Second) functional constituency (Chinese: 區議會（第二）功能界別) was a functional constituency in the elections for the Legislative Council of Hong Kong which was created in the 2012 constitutional reform package. It was the largest functional constituency consisted of registered voters who were not eligible for voting in the other functional constituencies.

== Background ==
In 2009, the government put forward the reform package of the election method of the 5th Legislative Council of Hong Kong in the 2012 LegCo election. Due to the resolution of the National People's Congress in 2007 the ratio of geographical constituency and functional constituency remained the same, the government's package suggested to add extra five seats in geographical constituency and functional constituency respectively. The five new functional constituency seats would be same as the District Council functional constituency, in which only district councillors could stand, nominate, and be elected.

The Democratic Party put forward a revised proposal that kept the restriction of candidates for the new District Council constituency to elected district councillors, but expanded the electorate to all registered voters in Hong Kong. The Democratic Party's proposal was accepted by the central authorities. In 2010, the LegCo passed the Consultation Document on the Methods for Selecting the Chief Executive and for Forming the LegCo in 2012 and the total 10 new seats in the sum of 5 seats of geographical constituencies and 5 seats of District Council (Second) functional constituency were created in the following 2012 LegCo election in September.

== Electoral method ==
Only elected members of the District Councils can become nominees and nominate candidates. Nominees have to get at least 15 nominations in order to run and are elected by all registered voters anywhere in Hong Kong who fulfill both of the requirements below:

- The voter does not belong to any other functional constituency, regardless of whether that constituency is contested or not in the election, and
- The voter did not request not to be registered for the District Council (Second) constituency when he or she registered as a voter or updated his or her information.

Since its voters are not part of the other functional constituencies, the District Council (Second) constituency is considered a de facto direct election and so the members elected are called the "Super District Councillors" or "5 Super Seats". The constituency is elected using proportional representation with the largest remainder method.

The constituency covers all regions of Hong Kong.

== Returned members ==
LegCo members for District Council (Second)
Term	Election	Member	Member	Member	Member	Member
5th	2012	James To (DP)	Starry Lee (DAB)	Frederick Fung (ADPL)	Chan Yuen-han (FTU)	Albert Ho (DP)
6th	2016	James To (DP)	Starry Lee (DAB)	Leung Yiu-chung (NWSC)	Holden Chow (DAB)	Kwong Chun-yu (DP)
6th	2016	Vacant	Starry Lee (DAB)	Vacant	Holden Chow (DAB)	Vacant

=== Summary of seats won ===
Term	Election	Distribution
5th	2012	2 / 1 / 1 / 1
6th	2016	1 / 2 / 2

	2012	2016
Democratic	2	2
DAB	1	2
ADPL	1	
FTU	1	
NWSC		1
Pro-dem	3	3
Pro-Beijing	2	2
Seats	5	5

=== Vote share summary ===
	2012	2016
Democratic	34.26	38.51
DAB	29.96	29.77
ADPL	16.47	0.90
FTU	15.47	12.21
NWSC		15.89
Civic		1.48
Neo Democrats		1.24
Independent and Others	3.84	
Pro-democracy	50.73	58.02
Pro-Beijing	45.43	41.98

== Electoral results ==

↓
1	2	2

Vote share
1. Democratic (38.5%)
2. DAB (29.8%)
3. NWSC (15.9%)
4. FTU (12.2%)
5. Civic (1.48%)
6. Neo Democrats (1.24%)
7. ADPL (0.90%)

2016 Legislative Council election: District Council (Second)
List	Candidates	Votes	Of total (%)	± from prev.
Quota		381,994	20.00	
Democratic	Kwong Chun-yu	491,667	25.74 (20.00+5.74)	+11.36
DAB	Starry Lee Wai-king Hung Lin-cham, Chu Lap-wai, Ngan Man-yu, Siu Ka-yi	304,222	15.93	–1.48
NWSC	Leung Yiu-chung	303,457	15.89	N/A
DAB	Holden Chow Ho-ding Li Sai-wing, Nixie Lam Lam, Mo Shing-fung	264,339	13.84	+1.29
Democratic	James To Kun-sun	243,930	12.77	–7.11
FTU	Wong Kwok-hing, Mok Kin-wing, Wong Wang-to, Lau Kwai-yung	233,236	12.21	–3.26
Civic	Sumly Chan Yuen-sum	28,311	1.48	N/A
Neo Democrats	Kwan Wing-yip, Hui Yui-yu, Lai Ming-chak	22,631	1.24	N/A
ADPL	Kalvin Ho Kai-ming	17,175	0.90	N/A
Total valid votes		1,909,968	100.00	
Rejected ballots		73,081		
Turnout		1,983,049	57.09	+5.14
Registered electors		3,473,792		

↓
2	1	1	1

Vote share
1. Democratic (34.3%)
2. DAB (30.0%)
3. ADPL (16.5%)
4. FTU (15.5%)
5. Other (3.84%)

2012 Legislative Council election: District Council (Second)
List	Candidates	Votes	Of total (%)	± from prev.
Quota		318,374	20.00	
Democratic	James To Kun-sun Andrew Chiu Ka-yin, Au Nok-hin	316,468	19.88	
DAB	Starry Lee Wai-king Hung Lin-cham, Chan Hok-fung, Chu Lap-wai, Ngan Man-yu	277,143	17.41	
ADPL	Frederick Fung Kin-kee Hui Kam-shing	262,172	16.47	
FTU	Chan Yuen-han Dennis Leung Tsz-wing, Wong Yun-cheong	246,196	15.47	
Democratic	Ho Chun-yan Kwong Chun-yu, Lam Siu-fai	228,840	14.38	
DAB (Civil Force)	Lau Kong-wah	199,732	12.55	
Independent	Pamela Peck Wan-kam	61,321	3.85	
Total valid votes		1,591,872	100.00	
Rejected ballots		80,921		
Turnout		1,672,793	51.95	
Registered electors		3,219,755		

== See also ==
- Legislative Council of Hong Kong
- 2016 Hong Kong legislative election
