= Leung Yiu-chung =

Hong Kong politician

- 梁耀忠
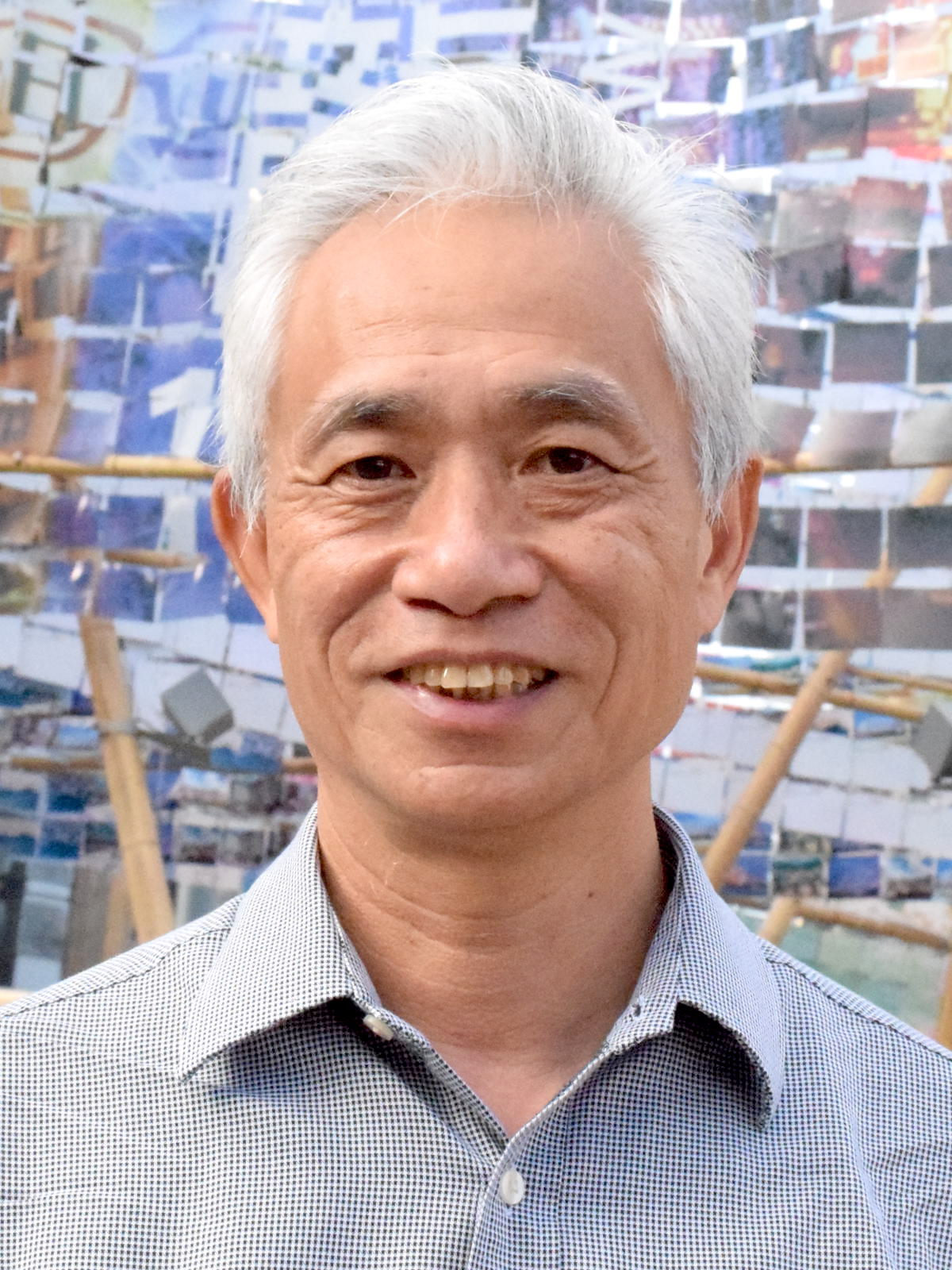

Member of the Legislative Council
- In office 1 October 2016 – 1 December 2020
- Preceded by: Frederick Fung
- Succeeded by: Constituency abolished
- Constituency: District Council (Second)
- In office 2 July 1998 – 30 September 2016
- Preceded by: New parliament
- Succeeded by: Andrew Wan
- Constituency: New Territories West
- In office 11 October 1995 – 27 June 1997
- Preceded by: New constituency
- Succeeded by: Sophie Leung
- Constituency: Textiles and Garment

Personal details
- Born: 19 May 1953 (age 73) Hong Kong
- Party: Neighbourhood and Worker's Service Centre
- Other political affiliations: Revolutionary Marxist League; Hong Kong Alliance in Support of Patriotic Democratic Movements of China
- Spouse: Lai Siu-chun
- Education: University of Essex (BA); University of Hong Kong (PGED)
- Profession: Politician; Legislative Councillor
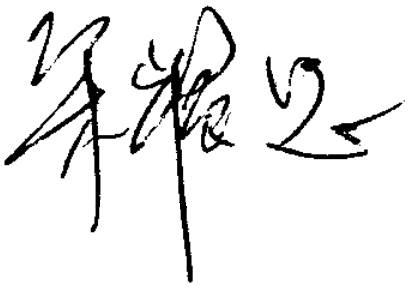
- Signature

Leung Yiu-chung
- Chinese: 梁耀忠
Transcriptions
Yue: Cantonese
- Yale Romanization: Lèuhng Yiuh jūng
- Jyutping: Loeng^{4} Jiu^{6} zung^{1}

Leung Yiu-chung (Chinese: 梁耀忠, born 19 May 1953) is a Hong Kong politician. He is a member of the pro-labour Neighbourhood and Worker's Service Centre, which is a part of the pan-democracy camp. He has had a long-standing tenure as a member of the Legislative Council of Hong Kong. Between 1998 and 2016, he represented the New Territories West geographical constituency, and from 2016 to 2020, he represented the District Council (Second) functional constituency. Leung has also served as a member of the Kwai Tsing District Council since 1985.

== Early career ==
Leung received his Bachelor of Arts degree in mathematics from the University of Essex and a Postgraduate Diploma in Education from the University of Hong Kong. After returning from the United Kingdom in 1978, Leung joined the New Youth Study Society, a labour school founded by activist Lau Shan-ching in Tsuen Wan, as a lecturer.

In the early 1980s, Leung led an investigation on 26 blocks of public housing that were discovered to be structurally dangerous, with Kwai Fong Estate in Kwai Chung most severely affected. His investigation compelled the Housing Authority to agree to dismantle and reconstruct the poorly constructed buildings. Leung also provided assistance to the residents throughout the reconstruction process.

== Political career ==
=== Political membership ===
Leung's political party is represented by Neighbourhood and Worker's Service Centre (NWSC) since 1985. Leung transformed the New Youth Study Society into the Neighbourhood and Worker's Service Centre after his first District Council win, as the public schools established by the government gradually replaced the labour schools.

In 2010, Leung was invited to participate in the establishment of a pro-labour party, along with ex-Civic legislator Fernando Cheung, Confederation of Trade Unions' Lee Cheuk-yan and Civic Act-up's Cyd Ho. The NWSC rejected the proposed membership in the newly founded Labour Party, and it also rejected Leung to join the party as an individual.

=== District Council ===
In 1985, Leung contested in the District Board election, representing the Kwai Chung Central constituency in the newly established Kwai Chung and Tsing Yi District Board, and he was elected. He continued to hold the Kwai Chung Central seat until 1994, when the constituency was split into multiple constituencies, including Kwai Fong where Leung had since held the seat. He was known as one of the "Kwai Tsing septet", along with Lee Wing-tat, Sin Chung-kai and four others.

On 25 November 2019, Leung won his seat in the district council election with 59.1% of the vote, marking his sixth consecutive election win within this constituency.

=== Legislative Council ===
Leung had a long 25-year tenure in the Legislative Council of Hong Kong, having served as a legislator since 1995, except briefly between 1997 and 1998. His first legislative council bid was in the 1991 legislative election for the New Territories South constituency, where Leung was not elected. In 1995, he was elected to the Legislative Council representing the new Textiles and Garment constituency created by the 1994 electoral reform.

During a 1996 Legislative Council meeting, he criticised the process of the election of the post-1997 chief executive by the communist-handpicked Selection Committee as "foul grass grows out of a foul ditch", which was deemed insulting to some of the legislators who were concurrently members of the Selection Committee. As a result, he was asked to withdraw from the chamber by the president of the Legislative Council Andrew Wong pursuant to Standing Order 34(2), becoming the first Hong Kong legislator to be expelled from a legislative sitting.

Leung left the legislature in June 1997, when the council was abolished and replaced by the Provisional Legislative Council. He returned to the Legislative Council at the 1998 legislative election to represent New Territories West. Leung held the seat in this constituency for subsequent elections until he won a seat for the District Council (Second) functional constituency in 2016.

On 12 October 2016, Leung was granted the authority to chair a Legislative Council meeting for the election of the new president, due to having the second highest seniority after presidential candidate James To. As the meeting progressed, Leung gave up his role, which was passed down to Abraham Shek. His decision to quit was met with controversy, as critics derided him for passing the position of power to the pro-establishment camp. The meeting concluded with pro-establishment candidate Andrew Leung elected as President of the Legislative Council of Hong Kong in a 38–0 vote.

On 19 June 2020, Leung announced his plans to contest the 2020 Hong Kong legislative election as the second candidate behind NWSC chairman Lo Ngai-yin. He stated that the party planned to run in the general election regardless of the outcome in the pro-democracy primaries. On 28 June, Leung declared that he and the NWSC would no longer be in contention, following criticism to his earlier statement.

=== Political activities ===
In the 1990s, Leung advocated for a group of young offenders who were held in indefinite imprisonment. He sought for definite sentencing terms, citing their young ages and the prospect of rehabilitation. Among the 60 politicians who were contacted for help, Leung was the only one who had followed up with assistance. A fictional retelling of his contributions was depicted in a Hong Kong movie, titled From the Queen to the Chief Executive, released in 2001.

In 2010, Leung published a memoir that documented the experiences in his political career. In the memoir, solicitor and former actress Mary Jean Reimer described Leung's advocacy towards the disadvantaged and socially vulnerable groups.

On 18 April 2020, Leung was one of the 15 high-profile pro-democracy figures arrested in Hong Kong. Leung's arrest was made on the claim that he participated in an unauthorized assembly on 18 August 2019 amid the anti-extradition bill protests.

In December 2021, Leung was sentenced, together with seven fellow activists, for illegal assembly over his participation in the 2020 Tiananmen vigil in Hong Kong, and for having "incited" the public to join them. Leung received a sentence of nine months. His release, initially scheduled for 13 June 2022, was delayed due to a jail sentence of two weeks imposed that month for "assaulting, obstructing or molesting" a pro-Beijing LegCo member during clashes at the LegCo Complex in May 2019.

== Publications ==
- 我固執而持久地，過這種生活 (2010) ISBN 9789881540362

Political offices
New constituency	Member of Kwai Tsing District Council; Representative for Kwai Fong; 1994–2021	Vacant
Legislative Council of Hong Kong
New constituency	Member of Legislative Council; Representative for Textiles and Garment; 1995–1997	Replaced by Provisional Legislative Council
New parliament	Member of Legislative Council; Representative for New Territories West; 1998–2016	Succeeded by Andrew Wan
Preceded by Frederick Fung	Member of Legislative Council; Representative for District Council (Second); 2016–2020	Constituency abolished
