= Hong Kong legislative elections =

Legislative elections are held in Hong Kong every four years to elect members of the Legislative Council (LegCo) in accordance with Article 69 of the Basic Law. Legislative elections are held either at the expiry of a four-year term or when the Chief Executive dissolves the legislature and calls a new election.

The electoral methods for returning members to the Legislative Council have changed greatly and frequently over the years. Reforms to introduce democratic elections to the legislature first began in 1985, when the first indirect elections were held. At its peak in 2012 and 2016, 35 members of the then 70-seat legislature were returned by direct elections in the geographical constituencies, with the remaining 35 elected from functional constituencies.

Following the 2021 electoral changes, elections are now held in three different groups of constituencies, which together return 90 members to the legislature, only 20 of which are returned via direct elections in the geographical constituencies. The elections have long been criticised for being insufficiently democratic, with the low number of directly elected seats and the more recent large-scale disqualifications of opposition candidates often cited as posing major barriers to democratic participation.

== History ==
The Legislative Council was composed exclusively of ex officio or nominated members from its establishment in 1883 through 1985.

=== Indirect elections to the legislature ===
Months before the Sino-British Joint Declaration was signed which the United Kingdom and the People's Republic of China governments agreed on handing over Hong Kong from British to Chinese rule in 1997, the Green Paper: the Further Development of Representative Government in Hong Kong was published in July 1984. The Green Paper cemented first large-scale constitutional reform in developing a representative government during the British rule. The Green Paper suggested the introduction of indirect election in two stages in 1985 and 1988 to the unofficial members of the Legislative Council of Hong Kong (LegCo) by an electoral college consisting of Members of the Urban Council of Hong Kong, the new Regional Council to be established in 1986, and District Boards and functional groups or functional constituencies. The first Legislative Council elections, electing 24 unofficial members of LegCo, was held in September 1985.

=== Popular elections to the legislature ===
Consultations on furthering electoral reform followed the 1985 electoral reform. In the White Paper: the Further Development of Representative Government in Hong Kong of 1984, the idea of direct election was suggested to be reviewed in the development of representative government in 1987.

In May 1987, the government published the 1987 Green Paper: Review of Developments in Representative Government to consider the next stage of development of representative government. Despite strong public opinion in the consultations supporting the introduction of direct elections, the Government concluded that no clear consensus on the timing or the extent of the introduction of direct elections emerged. The subsequent White Paper: the Development of Representative Government: The Way Forward delayed the first direct elections to the Legislative Council from 1988 to the 1991 elections. 18 members were returned from geographical constituencies by popular vote, out of a total of 60 LegCo members.

As Chris Patten succeeded David Wilson as the last Governor of Hong Kong, extensive electoral reform proposals were announced in Patten's inaugural Policy Address. The minimum voting age was lowered from 21 to 18, and all appointed seats on the Urban Council, Regional Council and District Boards were to be abolished by 1995. Single-member constituencies were to be introduced to geographical constituencies of the Legislative Council, elected seats of the Urban Council, elected seats of the Regional Council and elected seats of District Boards.

Patten significantly broadened the electoral franchise to the first fully-elected Legislative Council returned in 1995, the composition of which conformed with Basic Law provisions on the composition of the 1st Legislative Council of Hong Kong SAR. Patten lobbied the Legislative Council (Electoral Provisions) (Amendment) Bill 1994 which broadened the franchise of certain existing functional constituencies by replacing corporate voting with individual voting. 9 new functional constituency seats were established, allowing about 2.7 million people to have the right to vote in functional constituencies. An Election Committee composed of district board members returned 10 members to the Legislative Council.

In response to Patten's reforms, Beijing cancelled the "through-train arrangement" allowing the last Legislative Council in the British-era to be sworn in as the 1st Legislative Council of Hong Kong SAR after the transfer of sovereignty to China in 1997. The Preparatory Committee for the Hong Kong SAR under Chinese National People's Congress established the Provisional Legislative Council on 26 January 1996 that served as Hong Kong's interim legislature until July 1998.

=== Post-handover development ===
The Provisional Legislative Council (PLC) installed by the Beijing government during the intense Sino-British confrontation over the democratic reform decided on the electoral system of the post-handover Legislative Council. For geographical constituencies, proportional representation using the largest remainder method with Hare quota was adopted by the SAR government in replacement of the first-past-the-post system introduced in 1995. The system designed to reward the weaker pro-Beijing candidates and dilute the electoral strength of the majority democrats. For functional constituencies, corporate voting was restored after it was abolished in 1995. It reduced the number of eligible voters by almost 90 percent, from over 1.1 million in 1995 to fewer than 140,000 in 1998. The elected Urban Council and Regional Council were also abolished by Tung Chee-hwa's government.

The first legislative election in the HKSAR was held in 1998, with 20 members returned by geographical constituencies through direct elections, 10 members returned by the 800-member Election Committee and 30 members returned by functional constituencies (FC). The number of LegCo members returned from geographical constituencies (GC) increased from 20 to 24 in 2000 and to 30 in 2004, constituting half of the legislature. Seats returned by Election Committee were abolished by 2004.

=== 2005 electoral reform proposal ===
In April 2004, Mr. Tung Chee-Hwa, the former Chief Executive of Hong Kong, submitted his Report to the Standing Committee of the National People's Congress (NPCSC) on whether there is a need to amend the methods for selecting the Chief Executive of the Hong Kong in 2007 and for forming the Legislative Council of Hong Kong in 2008.

On 26 April 2004, the NPCSC at its 9th session of meeting adopted a Decision (see whole text), which rejected universal suffrage in both 2007 and 2008. However, the Decision allowed appropriate amendments to the methods for selection and formation of the Chief Executive and the Legco to be made as long as they conform to the principle of gradual and orderly progress. Afterwards, the government continued to consult the public on the issues of political reform by a special commission led by the Chief Secretary for Administration. Eventually, the government tabled its motions (see whole text) on the aforesaid amendments at the Legislative Council Meeting on 21 December 2005.

The motions were considered to have no progress and improvement to the democratic development by the pro-democracy councilors. Since the government lacked the endorsement of a two-thirds majority of all the members of the Legislative Council, both motions were voted down.

=== 2010 electoral reform ===
The Legislative Council passed the Government's bill on amending Annex II of the Basic Law. The total number of Legislative Council members is increased from 60 to 70. Alongside the creation of five new geographical constituency seats, five new functional constituency seats were created in the District Council (Second) FC. The 5 new FC seats were returned by direct elections through proportional representation using the largest remainder method with Hare quota.

The 2010 electoral reform provides for parallel voting, in which each registered voter can participating in the election of one geographical constituency and one functional constituency and

Parallel Voting in Legislative Council elections (2012-2021)
| | Geographical Constituencies | Functional Constituencies |
|---|---|---|
| Voters eligible for traditional FCs | 1 vote in respective GCs | 1 vote in respective traditional FCs |
| Other voters | 1 vote in respective GCs | 1 vote in the District Council (Second) FC |

The District Council (Second) FC was abolished by the National People's Congress under the 2021 Hong Kong electoral changes.

=== 2012 by-election procedure amendment proposal ===
In mid-May 2011, the government, which considered the resignations leading to "de facto referendum" (2010 Hong Kong by-election) 'abusive' and a waste of resources, revealed its plan to do away with by-elections entirely. Secretary for Constitutional and Mainland Affairs Stephen Lam proposed that a Legislative Council seat in any geographical constituency or one of the newly created five-seat district council 'superconstituency' vacated by the resignation or death of a legislator would be filled by a 'leapfrog' mechanism by the next best placed candidate at the previous election. The plan attracted criticism from Pan-Democrats; even its allies in the legislature expressed reservations about the workability of the plan. The Bar Association severely criticised the plan, expressing concern over the constitutionality of the proposals, particularly the reasonableness on restrictions on the right to participation.

The government tabled a bill to amend current legislation for by-elections for 13 July. Following call by the Central Government Liaison Office to re-think, the government revised its proposal on 28 June stipulating replacement by an unsuccessful candidate on the same election ticket. The government bowed to pressure and announced one week later that it would suspend reading of the bill for two months, pending consultations on the revised proposals.

=== 2021 electoral reform ===
The Standing Committee of the National People's Congress amended Annex II of the Basic Law on 30 March 2021. Under the reform, the Legislative Council is now composed of 90 members returned from 3 constituencies, with seats returned by Geographical Constituencies reduced from 35 to 20; the Election Committee Constituency was re-established for returning 40 members.

== Electoral system ==
Under the 2021 Hong Kong electoral changes initiated by the National People's Congress, the Legislative Council is now composed of 90 members returned from 3 constituencies. Each candidate running for Legislative elections is to be nominated by 10-20 members of the Election Committee, before their eligibility is reviewed and confirmed by the Candidate Eligibility Review Committee of the HKSAR according to opinions issued by the Committee for Safeguarding National Security of the Hong Kong Special Administrative Region:

Composition of the Legislative Council (2022-)
| | Number of Members | Returned by | Voting Method | Number of Voters (2021) |
|---|---|---|---|---|
| Election Committee; Constituency | 40 | Members of the Election Committee | Plurality block voting | 1,448 |
| Functional Constituencies | 30 | Members of specified associations or professions | First-past-the-post voting or Plurality block voting | 210,675 (individual voters); 8,579 (body voters) |
| Geographical Constituencies | 20 | Popular vote | Single non-transferable vote | 4,472,863 |

Composition and Proportion (%) of Elected Seats of the Legislative Council
| | 1985 | 1988 | 1991 | 1995 | PLC | 1998 | 2000 | 2004 | 2008 | 2012 | 2016 | 2021 |
|---|---|---|---|---|---|---|---|---|---|---|---|---|
| Returned by the Selection Committee or Election Committee | —N/a | | | | 60 (100%) | 10 (16.7%) | 6 (10%) | —N/a | | | | 40 (44.4%) |
| Functional; Constituencies (Note: Excluding the District Council (Second) Functional Constituency, which was returned by popular vote; and the Urban Council, Regional Council and District Council (First) functional constituencies, which were returned by indirect elections.) | 12 (21.1%) | 14 (24.6%) | 19 (31.1%) | 28 (46.7%) | —N/a | 28 (46.7%) | 29 (48.3%) | | | 29 (41.4%) | | 30 (33.3%) |
| Seats returned by indirect election (Note: 12 electoral colleges were established to return unofficial members of the Legislative Council in the 1985 and 1988 Legislative Council elections, composed of members of district boards and municipal councils. Between 1991 and 1998, 2 members were returned by the Urban Council and Regional Council functional constituencies. In the 1995 Legislative Council election, 10 seats were returned through an Election Committee composed of elected members of district boards. Between 2000 and 2016, 1 member was returned by District Council (First) Functional Constituency.) | 12 (21.1%) | | 2 (3.3%) | 12 (20%) | —N/a | 2 (3.3%) | 1 (1.7%) | | | 1 (1.4%) | | —N/a |
| Seats returned by popular vote (Note: Including Geographical Constituencies and the District Council (Second) Functional Constituency.) | —N/a | | 18 (29.5%) | 20 (33.3%) | —N/a | 20 (33.3%) | 24 (40%) | 30 (50%) | | 40 (57.1%) | | 20 (22.2%) |

=== Geographical Constituencies ===
20 seats of the Legislative Council are returned by geographical constituencies (GC) through single non-transferable vote with a district magnitude of 2 ("binomial system"). The binomial system was instituted by the Standing Committee of the National People's Congress in its amendment to Annex 2 of the Basic Law on 30 March 2021.

| Geographical constituency | Number of voters | Number of seats | Voting system |
|---|---|---|---|
| Hong Kong Island East | 424,849 | 2 | Single non-transferable vote |
| Hong Kong Island West | 374,795 | 2 | Single non-transferable vote |
| Kowloon East | 475,223 | 2 | Single non-transferable vote |
| Kowloon West | 381,484 | 2 | Single non-transferable vote |
| Kowloon Central | 454,595 | 2 | Single non-transferable vote |
| New Territories South East | 472,751 | 2 | Single non-transferable vote |
| New Territories North | 431,604 | 2 | Single non-transferable vote |
| New Territories North West | 468,752 | 2 | Single non-transferable vote |
| New Territories South West | 510,558 | 2 | Single non-transferable vote |
| New Territories North East | 478,252 | 2 | Single non-transferable vote |

Geographical constituencies were first introduced in Hong Kong's first legislative election with direct elections in 1991. The electoral system and boundaries of GCs has evolved over time. The first popular election in 1991 used a dual-seat constituency dual vote system with two seats to be filled in each constituency, and responding to criticism, new election methods were explored, and the possibility of electoral reform was almost certain, with single non-transferable vote (SNTV) and party-list proportional representation being strongly considered. However, responding to public dissatisfication with the details, the electoral reform movement started losing popularity and, in the end, the government prescribed simple plurality as a last resort.

The problems of this system were quickly realized when the DAB obtained one-quarter of the vote and received only two out of 20 directly elected seats in the 1995 elections - the final before Hong Kong reverted to Chinese rule. The artificial majority of the democratic camp received harsh criticism from the pro-Beijing camp and the Chinese government. The same two options from the last session were brought back to the agenda; and when Chief Executive Tung Chee-Hwa came to power, he selected proportional representation over SNTV as the new system.

Changes to the electoral system of geographical constituencies are outlined as follows:

| Election Year | Voting system | Number of constituencies | District magnitude | Total number of GC seats | Proportion of LegCo seats |
|---|---|---|---|---|---|
| 1991 | Plurality-at-large | 9 constituencies | 2 seats | 18 seats | 29.5% |
| 1995 | First-past-the-post voting | 20 constituencies | 1 seat | 20 seats | 33.3% |
| 1998 | Proportional representation (Largest remainder method: Hare quota) | 5 constituencies | 3-9 seats | 20 seats | 33.3% |
| 2000 | Proportional representation (Largest remainder method: Hare quota) | 5 constituencies | 3-9 seats | 24 seats | 40% |
| 2004 | Proportional representation (Largest remainder method: Hare quota) | 5 constituencies | 3-9 seats | 30 seats | 50% |
| 2008 | Proportional representation (Largest remainder method: Hare quota) | 5 constituencies | 3-9 seats | 30 seats | 50% |
| 2012 | Proportional representation (Largest remainder method: Hare quota) | 5 constituencies | 3-9 seats | 35 seats | 50% |
| 2016 | Proportional representation (Largest remainder method: Hare quota) | 5 constituencies | 3-9 seats | 35 seats | 50% |
| 2021 | Single non-transferable vote | 10 constituencies | 2 seats | 20 seats | 22.2% |

=== Functional Constituencies ===
Under the 2021 Hong Kong electoral changes, 28 functional constituencies (FC) return 30 members. The Labour Functional Constituency returns three members by plurality block voting. The other FCs return one member each with first-past-the-post voting.

The 2021 electoral reform saw the dissolution of District Council (First) and District Council (Second) FCs. 3 existing FCs were reconstituted: the Information Technology FC reorganized as the Technology & Innovation FC; the Medical FC and Health Services FC combined to form the Medical and Health Services FC. 2 new FCs were established, namely the Commercial (Third) and the HKSAR Deputies to the National People's Congress, HKSAR Members of the National Committee of the Chinese People's Political Consultative Conference, and Representatives of Relevant National Organisations FCs. Functional constituencies are now principally elected by body votes; the number of FCs with individual votes were reduced, together with elimination of mixed individual and body voting systems.

Registered voters in the functional constituencies of Hong Kong in 2021
| Functional constituency | | Number of registered electors | | |
| Functional constituency | | Bodies | Individuals | Total |
|---|---|---|---|---|
| 1 | Heung Yee Kuk | | 161 | 161 |
| 2 | Agriculture and Fisheries | 176 | | 176 |
| 3 | Insurance | 126 | | 126 |
| 4 | Transport | 223 | | 223 |
| 5 | Education | | 85,117 | 85,117 |
| 6 | Legal | | 7,549 | 7,549 |
| 7 | Accountancy | | 27,778 | 27,778 |
| 8 | Medical and Health Services | | 55,523 | 55,523 |
| 9 | Engineering | | 10,772 | 10,772 |
| 10 | Architectural, Surveying and Planning | | 9,123 | 9,123 |
| 11 | Labour | 697 | | 697 |
| 12 | Social Welfare | | 13,974 | 13,974 |
| 13 | Real Estate and Construction | 463 | | 463 |
| 14 | Tourism | 192 | | 192 |
| 15 | Commercial (First) | 1,041 | | 1,041 |
| 16 | Commercial (Second) | 421 | | 421 |
| 17 | Commercial (Third) | 288 | | 288 |
| 18 | Industrial (First) | 421 | | 421 |
| 19 | Industrial (Second) | 592 | | 592 |
| 20 | Finance | 114 | | 114 |
| 21 | Financial Services | 760 | | 760 |
| 22 | Sports, Performing Arts, Culture and Publication | 257 | | 257 |
| 23 | Import and Export | 231 | | 231 |
| 24 | Textiles and Garment | 348 | | 348 |
| 25 | Wholesale and Retail | 2,015 | | 2,015 |
| 26 | Technology and Innovation | 73 | | 73 |
| 27 | Catering | 141 | | 141 |
| 28 | HKSAR members of NPC and CPPCC, representatives of national organisations | | 678 | 678 |
| Total | | 8,579 | 210,675 | 219,254 |

=== Election Committee Constituency ===
The Election Committee constituency was one of the three constituencies designed in the Basic Law of Hong Kong next to the directly elected geographical constituencies and the indirectly elected functional constituencies for the first and second-term Legislative Council fin the early SAR period. With the last British Governor Chris Patten's electoral reform, the ECC was composed of all elected District Board members who had been elected in 1994. The Single Transferable Vote system was used in the 1995 election.

After the handover of Hong Kong, the ECC was allocated 10 seats out of the total 60 seats in the SAR Legislative Council, comprising all members of the Election Committee which also elected the Chief Executive every five years. The size of the constituency reduced to six seats in 2000 and was entirely abolished and replaced by the directly elected geographical constituency seats in the 2004 election. The plurality-at-large voting system was used in 1998 and 2000.

In the 2021 electoral overhaul, the Election Committee constituency was reintroduced, taking 40 of the 90 seats, almost half, of the Legislative Council with plurality-at-large voting system. The electorate is composed of all newly expanded 1,500 members in the Election Committee.

== Electoral results ==
Legislative Council elections
| Election | Largest faction in LegCo | Composition of LegCo (by alignment) | Largest faction in directly elected seats | Composition of directly elected seats (by alignment) | % of popular vote won by the largest faction in directly elected seats | Turnout in direct election |
|---|---|---|---|---|---|---|
| 1991 | Pro-Beijing/ Conservative; Camp | 23:4:34 | Pro-democracy; Camp | 16:2 | 61.63% | 35.72% |
| 1995 | Pro-democracy; Camp | 31:30 | Pro-democracy; Camp | 16:4 | 61.13% | 35.42% |
| 1998 | Pro-Beijing; Camp | 20:40 | Pro-democracy; Camp | 15:5 | 66.36% | 53.29% |
| 2000 | Pro-Beijing; Camp | 21:39 | Pro-democracy; Camp | 16:8 | 60.56% | 43.57% |
| 2004 | Pro-Beijing; Camp | 25:35 | Pro-democracy; Camp | 18:12 | 62.44% | 55.63% |
| 2008 | Pro-Beijing; Camp | 23:37 | Pro-democracy; Camp | 19:11 | 59.50% | 45.20% |
| 2012 | Pro-Beijing; Camp | 27:43 | Pro-democracy; Camp | 21:19 | 56.24% (GC); 50.73% (DCII) | 53.05% (GC); 51.95% (DCII) |
| 2016 | Pro-Beijing; Camp | 29:1:41 | Pro-democracy; Camp | 21:19 | 55.02% (GC); 58.02% (DCII) | 58.28% (GC); 57.09% (DCII) |
| 2021 | Pro-Beijing; Camp | 1:89 | Pro-Beijing; Camp | 0:20 | 91.25% | 30.20% |

Legends

- ：Pro-democracy Camp
- ：Pro-Beijing Camp
- ：non-aligned and others

== Voter registration ==
An individual must satisfy all the following requirements to be eligible for registration as electors in a geographical constituency:

- permanent resident of Hong Kong;
- aged 18 years or above as at 25 July next following his application for registration (or 25 September in a District Council election year)
- ordinarily resident in Hong Kong, and the residential address in his application for registration is his only or principal residence in Hong Kong;
- holds a Hong Kong identity document or has applied for a new identity card; and
- not disqualified by application of s.31 of the Legislative Council Ordinance (Cap 542).

An elector can also register for suffrage in functional constituencies (FCs) if:

- for FCs returned by individual votes, he or she is an individual member of specified associations or professions prescribed in the Legislative Council Ordinance (Cap. 542); and
- for FCs returned by body votes, he or she is nominated as the representative of a body members of specified associations / professions prescribed in the Legislative Council Ordinance (Cap. 542), operating for 3 years immediately before making its application for registration as a voter.

Upon the 2021 electoral reform, electors may concurrently have at most 4 votes in a LegCo general election:

| | Popular vote | Restricted suffrage | |
|---|---|---|---|
| Voters with GC suffrage only | Geographical; Constituencies (GC) | —N/a | —N/a |
| Voters eligible for FCs with individual votes | Geographical; Constituencies (GC) | Functional; Constituencies (FC) | —N/a |
| Voters representing body members of FCs with body votes | Geographical; Constituencies (GC) | Functional; Constituencies (FC) | —N/a |
| Voters eligible for FCs with individual votes, who are also EC members | Geographical; Constituencies (GC) | Functional; Constituencies (FC) | Election Committee; Constituency |
| Voters representing body members of FCs with body votes, who are also EC members | Geographical; Constituencies (GC) | Functional; Constituencies (FC) | Election Committee; Constituency |
| Election Committee (EC) members with no FC suffrage | Geographical; Constituencies (GC) | —N/a | Election Committee; Constituency |

== Candidacy ==
Individuals may be nominated during a two-week nomination period ending five weeks before polling day.

=== Candidacy requirement ===
Candidates across constituencies have to fulfill the following requirements:

- has reached 21 years of age;
- is a permanent resident of Hong Kong;
- is registered and eligible for registration as an elector for geographical constituencies; and
- has ordinary resided in Hong Kong for the 3 years immediately preceding the nomination.

In addition, candidates in all constituencies except 12 specified functional constituencies have to be a Chinese citizen with no right of abode in any country other than the People's Republic of China.

12 Specified Functional Constituencies
| Legal | Commercial (First) | Accountancy | Industrial (Second) |
| Engineering | Finance | Architectural, surveying, planning and landscape | Financial Services |
| Real Estate and Construction | Import and Export | Tourism | Insurance |

Candidates of functional constituencies have to be registered and eligible for registration as an elector for the functional constituency, or as an authorized representative of corporate electors. He or she must have a substantial connection with the constituency.

=== Nomination threshold ===
Under the 2021 Hong Kong electoral changes, candidates in Legislative Council elections across all 3 constituencies are required seek nominations from 10 to 20 members of the Election Committee.

Nomination thresholds of each constituency are as follows:

| Constituency | Threshold |
|---|---|
| Election Committee Constituency | Nomination by at least 10, but not more than 20, members of the Election Committee, and with; Nomination by 2-4 members of each sector of the Election Committee. |
| Functional Constituency (FC) | Nomination by at least 10, but not more than 20, voters of the respective FC, and; Nomination by at least 10, but not more than 20, members of the Election Committee, and with; Nomination by 2-4 members of each sector of the Election Committee. |
| Geographical Constituency (GC) | Nomination by at least 100, but not more than 200, voters of the respective GC, and; Nomination by at least 10, but not more than 20, members of the Election Committee, and with; Nomination by 2-4 members of each sector of the Election Committee. |

=== Candidate eligibility review ===
Under the 2021 Hong Kong electoral changes initiated by the National People's Congress, nominees for elections are screened so as to ensure the "administration of Hong Kong by Hong Kong people with patriots as the main body". A Candidate Eligibility Review mechanism is established to review and confirm of eligibility of candidates for the Election Committee, Chief Executive and Legislative Council elections:

- Review by the department for safeguarding national security of the Hong Kong Police Force on whether a candidate meets the legal requirements and conditions of upholding the Basic Law and swearing allegiance to HKSAR of the People's Republic of China;
- the Committee for Safeguarding National Security of the Hong Kong Special Administrative Region issues opinion in respect of a candidate who fails to meet such legal requirements and conditions on the basis of the police review; and
- Review and Confirmation of eligibility of candidates by the Candidate Eligibility Review Committee of the HKSAR.

In practice, every candidate approved to run for election to the Legislative Council is either a member of the pro-Beijing camp or has otherwise been deemed "patriotic" enough by the government of China to participate.

=== Deposits and refund ===
Each list of candidates is subject to a deposit of $50,000 for a geographical constituency, and $25,000 for a "functional constituency". Deposits are forfeit if the list (or candidate) fails to receive at least 3% of the valid votes cast in the constituency.

=== Rebate of campaign expenses ===
Since the 2004 election, the Government has instituted a system to issue a rebate to candidates of $10 rebate for each vote received, capped at 50 per cent of the candidate's total election expenses. Candidate qualify for the rebate by winning a seat or securing 3% or more of the valid votes cast, and a list of candidates is qualified if one or more of its members wins a seat or the list secures 3% or more of the valid votes cast. They are entitled to one free round of promotional material sent by post, and a chance to state their platforms free of charge on RTHK. Upon application, the Government will pay the difference between election expenses incurred and donations received, subject to a cap dependent on the number of votes cast for the candidate ($11 per vote at 2008).
