= Neighbourhood and Worker's Service Centre =

Neighbourhood and Worker's Service Centre 街坊工友服務處
- Chairman: Lo Ngai-yin
- Vice-Chairman: Leung Yiu-chung
- Founded: 1985; 41 years ago
- Headquarters: 23B Mei Wan Street, Tsuen Wan, New; Territories
- Membership (2018): ▼48
- Ideology: Social democracy Liberalism (Hong Kong)
- Political position: Centre-left
- Regional affiliation: Pro-democracy camp
- Legislative Council: 0 / 90
- District Councils: 0 / 470

Website
- www.nwsc.org.hk

Neighbourhood and Worker's Service Centre
- Traditional Chinese: 街坊工友服務處
Transcriptions
Yue: Cantonese
- Yale Romanization: Gāai fōng gūng yáuh fuhk mouh syu
- Jyutping: Gaai^{1} fong^{1} gung^{1} jau^{5} fuk^{6} mou^{6} syu^{3}

Alternative Chinese name
- Traditional Chinese: 街工
Transcriptions
Yue: Cantonese
- Yale Romanization: Gāai gūng
- Jyutping: Gaai^{1} gung^{1}

The Neighbourhood and Worker's Service Centre (NWSC) is a pro-democracy political group in Hong Kong, holding one seat in the Legislative Council from 1995 to 1997 and from 1998 to 2021. It was founded in 1985, with its roots in the New Youth Study Society, founded in 1979. Politically, it is identified as belonging to the pan-democracy camp.

== History ==
=== Founding ===
The NWSC was founded in 1985 at the root of the New Youth Study Society in Tsuen Wan, a social group formed by activist Lau Shan-ching and other graduates from the University of Hong Kong, aiming to provide education for workers and raise their social consciousness. However, as the government set up night courses for adults in the early 1980s, the number of workers attending society's courses dropped. The lecturers and students in the society decided to participate in the newly established District Board elections as the government introduced constitutional reform.

Leung Yiu-chung, the lecturer of the New Youth Study Society, led the Kwai Chung residents affected by concrete spalling and seepage in their public housing estates to demand solutions from the Housing Department. It later turned out to be a full-scale "26 blocks scandal". Leung was subsequently elected in the Kwai Chung Central constituency in the first District Board elections in 1985 and founded the Neighbourhood and Worker's Service Centre.

=== 1980s to 1990s ===
In 1987 and 1988, the NWSC was involved in labour strikes in the Kwai Chung industrial area, including foreign electric companies such as Digital Equipment Corporation, Seiko and Philips.

In the 1988 District Board elections, Leung Yiu-chung and Tsui Pak-lam won seats in the Kwai Tsing District Council in the Kwai Fong and Kwai Hing constituencies.

The NWSC supported the Tiananmen Square protests of 1989 and joined the Hong Kong Alliance in Support of Patriotic Democratic Movements of China.

After a debate and voting, the NWSC nominated Leung Yiu-chung to run in the first Legislative Council direct elections in 1991. Running as an independent, Leung failed to be elected in the New Territories South constituency.

In the 1994 District Board elections, NWSC members Leung Yiu-chung, Tsui Pak-lam and Leung Chi-shing contested in the Kwai Wah, Kwai Fong and Kwai Hing constituencies, Leung Yiu-chung and Leung Chi-shing were elected.

Leung Yiu-chung was first elected to the Legislative Council in the 1995 elections through the newly created Textiles and Garment functional constituency under the then Governor Chris Patten's electoral reform.

The NWSC stood for the workers and grassroots interests in the LegCo. In 1996, Leung proposed an amendment to the Housing Ordinance to restrict the public housing rent to be increased only every three years, and the median rent to income ratio could not exceed ten percent passed in late June 1997. Leung also moved a motion condemning the Preparatory Committee for the HKSAR as undemocratic. The NWSC boycotted the Beijing-controlled Provisional Legislative Council and protested against the Provisional Legislative Council's repeal of labour laws.

Following the transfer of sovereignty over Hong Kong in 1997, Leung demanded a sentence for the young offenders detained "at Her Majesty's pleasure".

Leung Yiu-chung returned to the Legislative Council in the first Legislative Council elections in 1998 after the SAR was established. Leung Yiu-chung became the only NWSC member in the Legislative Council since. Leung Yiu-chung and Leung Chi-shing were re-elected in the following District Council elections in 1999.

=== 2000s to present ===
In 2000 after the fire in Tai O, the NWSC helped the residents to demand for compensation and reconstruction. It also negotiated with the Hongkong and Yaumati Ferry to improve the frequency of service for the Tai O residents. Its services also extended to the new community in Tin Shui Wai.

The NWSC joined the WTO protests in 2005. Many NWSC were arrested afterwards. In 2006, the NWSC opposed the privatisation of the shopping centres and car parks of the Housing Department. The NWSC also supported the metal workers strike in 2007.

In November 2007, the NWSC retained three seats held by Leung Yiu-chung, Leung Chi-shing and Andrew Wan and also won a new seat with Wong Yun-tat in Kwai Chung Estate. Leung Wing-kun, who lost in the election and Andrew Wan left the NWSC in 2007 and 2008 respectively.

In 2009, the NWSC joined the alliance against the Guangzhou-Hong Kong Express Rail Link.

During the debate over the 2010 Hong Kong electoral reform, the NWSC opposed to both the "Five Constituency Referendum movement" triggered by the Civic Party and the League of Social Democrats and the revised proposals introduced by the Democratic Party and the Association for Democracy and People's Livelihood. The strategic conflicts within the pan-democracy camp resulted in a split between the factions. The NWSC remained fairly neutral.

In the 2016 Legislative Council election, NWSC veteran legislator Leung Yiu-chung switched his constituency from New Territories West to the territory-wide District Council (Second) constituency. Leung was elected with more than 300,000 votes, but his protege Wong Yuen-tat failed to retain his seat in the New Territories West with only about 20,000 votes.

In June 2018, some 22 younger members of the NWSC, including five members of the NWSC's eight-member executive board, left the centre amid ideological differences with Leung Yiu-chung and Leung's decision to scrap the workers' committee due to financial woes, as Leung intended to fund his re-election in the next election in 2020. The exodus was followed by two NWSC District Councillors, Wong Yun-tat, who was seen as Leung's most likely successor, and Leung Kam-wai, who quit the centre in July, leaving NWSC with only two District Councillors.

== Electoral performance ==
=== Legislative Council elections ===
Election	Number of popular votes	% of popular votes	GC seats	FC seats	EC seats	Total seats	+/−	Position
1995	–	–	0	1	0	1 / 60	1▲	5th▲
1998	38,627	2.61	1	0	0	1 / 60	–	6th
2000	59,348▲	4.50▲	1	0	0	1 / 60	0	7th
2004	59,033▼	3.33▼	1	0		1 / 60	0	4th▲
2008	42,441▼	2.80▼	1	0		1 / 60	0	7th▲
2012	43,799▲	2.42▼	1	0		1 / 70	0	10th▼
2016	20,974▼	0.97▼	0	1		1 / 70	0	10th▲
2021	Did not contest		—N/a	—N/a	—N/a	0 / 90	1▼	—N/a

=== District Council elections ===
Election	Number of popular votes	% of popular votes	Total elected seats	+/−
1991	5,978	1.12	2 / 272	0
1994	859▼	0.13▼	1 / 346	1▼
1999	3,295▲	0.41▲	2 / 390	0
2003	14,146▲	1.35▲	4 / 400	1▲
2007	12,565▼	1.10▼	4 / 405	0
2011	14,364▲	1.22▲	5 / 412	2▲
2015	16,105▲	1.11▼	5 / 431	0
2019	16,176▲	0.55▼	4 / 452	2▲
