= 2012 Hong Kong legislative election in Kowloon East =

- 9 September 2012

All 5 Kowloon East seats to the Legislative Council
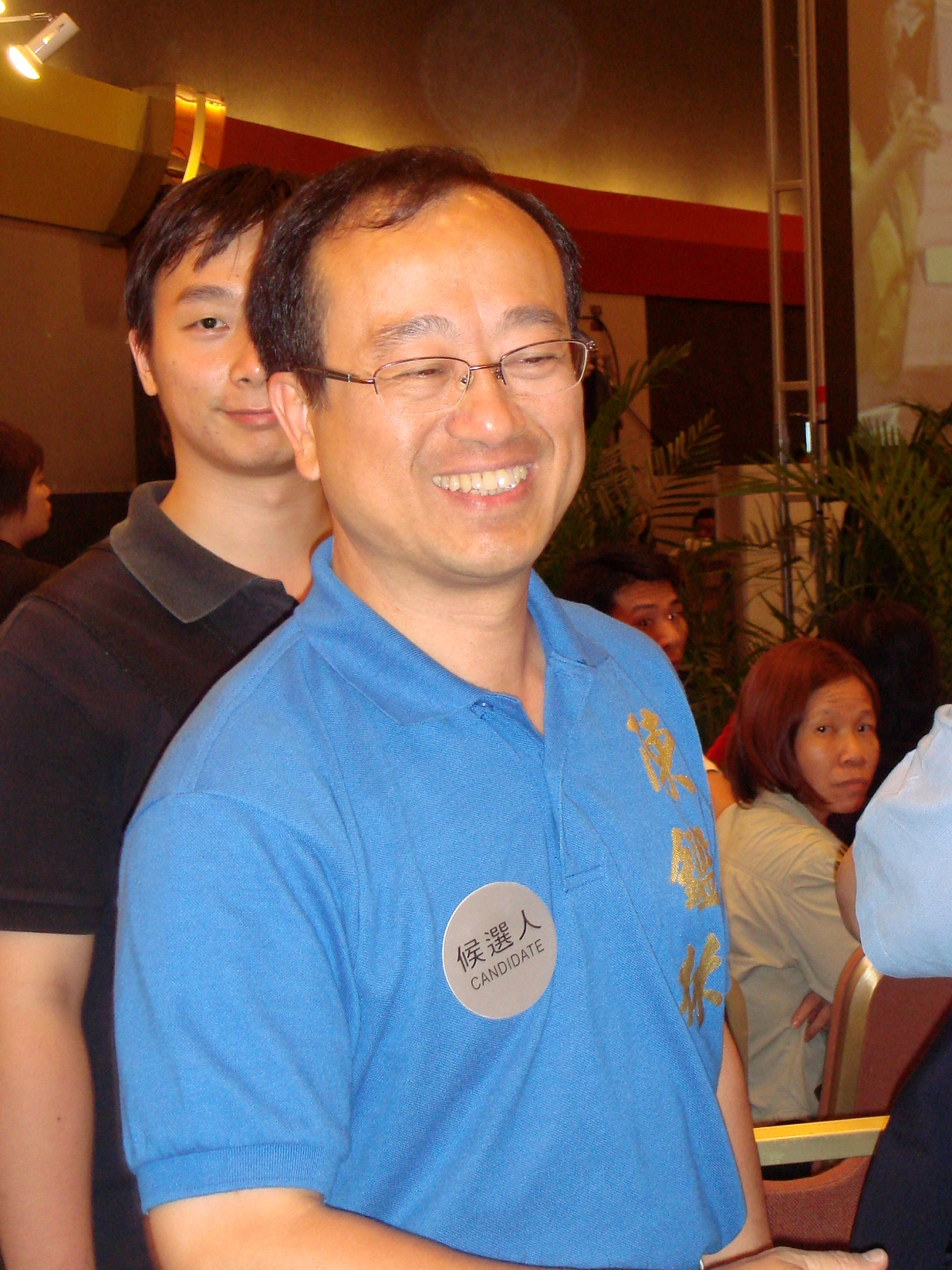

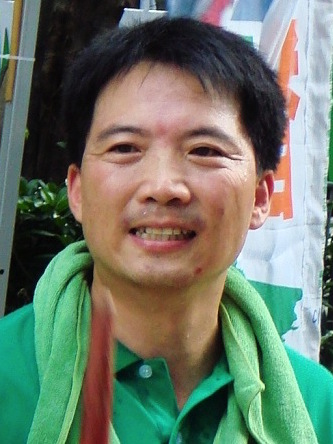

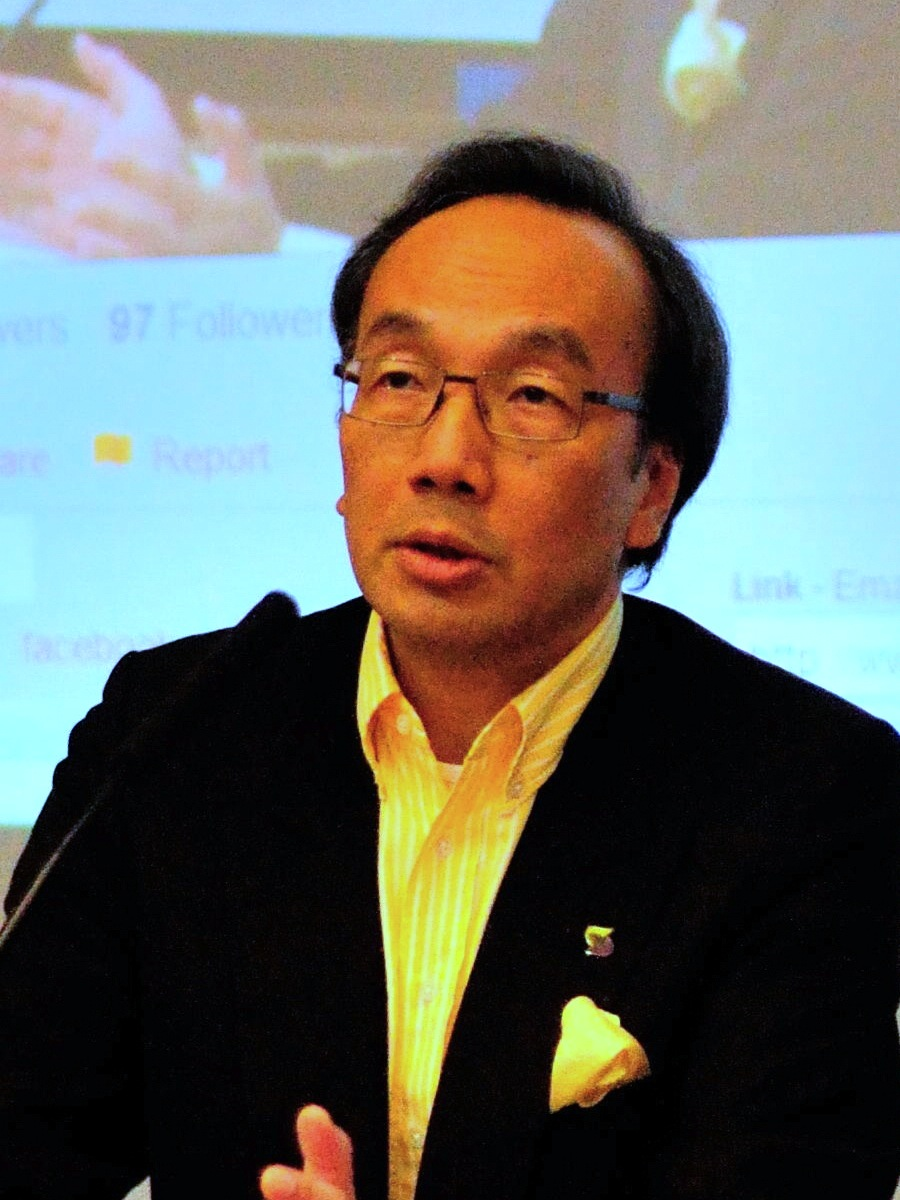

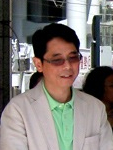

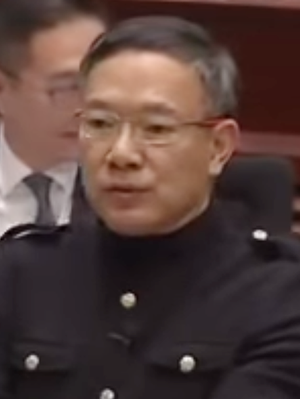
	First party	Second party	Third party
Leader	Chan Kam-lam	Wu Chi-wai	Alan Leong
Party	DAB	Democratic	Civic
Alliance	Pro-Beijing	Pan-democracy	Pan-democracy
Last election	1 seat, 22.6%	1 seat, 18.2%	1 seat, 16.6%
Seats before	1	1	1
Seats won	1	1	1
Seat change	Steady	Steady	Steady
Popular vote	47,415	43,764	41,669
Percentage	16.7%	15.4%	14.6%
Swing	▼5.9%	▼11.9%	▼2.0%
	Fourth party	Fifth party
Leader	Wong Kwok-kin	Paul Tse
Party	FTU	Independent
Alliance	Pro-Beijing	Pro-Beijing
Last election	1 seat, 21.3%	No seat
Seats before	1	0
Seats won	1	1
Seat change	Steady	▲1
Popular vote	40,824	38,546
Percentage	14.3%	13.5%
Swing	▼7.0%	N/A
- Party with most votes in each District Council Constituency.

These are the Kowloon East results of the 2012 Hong Kong legislative election. The election was held on 9 September 2012 and all 5 seats in Kowloon East where consisted of Wong Tai Sin District and Kwun Tong District were contested. It was the first time the Pro-Beijing camp gained the majority of the Kowloon East seats. The Democratic Party, Democratic Alliance for the Betterment and Progress of Hong Kong, Federation of Trade Unions and Civic Party each secured their party's incumbent seat. The new last seat was gained by the pro-Beijing independent candidate Paul Tse, defeating the two radical democrats Wong Yeung-tat and Andrew To and former LegCo member Mandy Tam with narrow margin.

== Overall results ==
Before election:

↓
2	2
Pan-democracy	Pro-Beijing

Change in composition:

↓
2	3
Pan-democracy	Pro-Beijing

Party	Seats	Seats change	Contesting list(s)	Votes	%	% change
Democratic	1	0	1	43,764	15.4	−7.0
Civic	1	0	1	41,669	14.6	−2.0
People Power	0	0	1	36,608	12.9	N/A
LSD	0	0	1	27,253	9.6	−2.5
Independent	0	0	1	5,440	1.9	N/A
Pro-democracy camp	2	0	5	154,734	54.3	−1.7
DAB	1	0	1	47,415	16.7	−5.9
FTU	1	0	1	40,824	14.3	−7.0
Independent	1	0	1	38,546	13.5	N/A
Pro-Beijing camp	3	+1	3	126,785	44.5	+0.6
Independent	0	0	1	3,263	1.2	N/A
Turnout:				284,782	51.1	

== Candidates list ==
Legislative Election 2012: Kowloon East
List	Candidates	Votes	Of total (%)	± from prev.
DAB	Chan Kam-lam Joe Lai Wing-ho, Hung Kam-in, Wilson Or Chong-shing	47,415	16.65	−5.95
Democratic	Wu Chi-wai Mok Kin-shing, Hon Ka-ming	43,764	15.37	−5.03
Civic	Alan Leong Kah-kit Jeremy Jansen Tam Man-ho	41,669	14.63	−1.97
FTU	Wong Kwok-kin Kan Ming-tung, Mok Kin-wing, Ho Kai-ming	40,824	14.34	−6.96
Independent	Paul Tse Wai-chun	38,546	13.54	N/A
People Power	Wong Yeung-tat, Chan Sau-wai	36,608	12.85	N/A
LSD	Andrew To Kwan-hang	27,253	9.57	−2.68
Independent	Tam Heung-man	5,440	1.91	N/A
Nonpartisan	Kay Yim Fung-chi, Chan Heung-yin	3,263	1.15	N/A
Turnout		284,782	51.05	+7.04

== Results by districts ==
List	Candidates	Wong Tai Sin	Kwun Tong	Total
Civic	Alan Leong	14.06	15.05	14.63
FTU	Wong Kwok-kin	16.97	12.42	14.34
LSD	Andrew To	9.96	9.29	9.57
Nonpartisan	Kay Yim	1.11	1.17	1.15
Democratic	Wu Chi-wai	17.52	13.80	15.37
DAB	Chan Kam-lam	13.37	19.04	16.65
Independent	Paul Tse	11.59	14.95	13.54
People Power	Wong Yeung-tat	12.91	12.82	12.86
Independent	Mandy Tam	2.51	1.47	1.91

== See also ==
- Legislative Council of Hong Kong
- Hong Kong legislative elections
- 2012 Hong Kong legislative election
