= 2008 Hong Kong legislative election in Kowloon East =

- 7 September 2008

All 4 Kowloon East seats to the Legislative Council
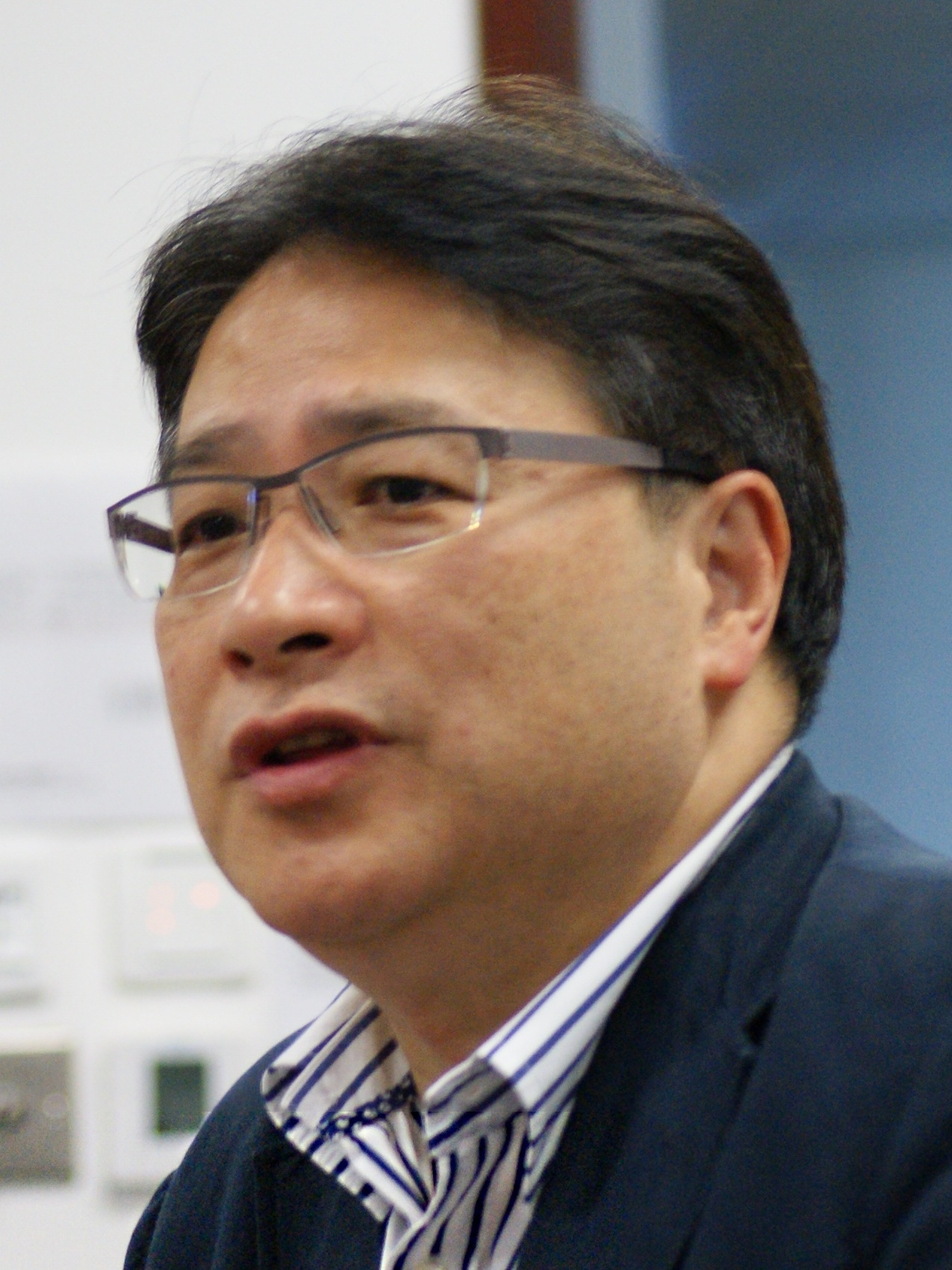

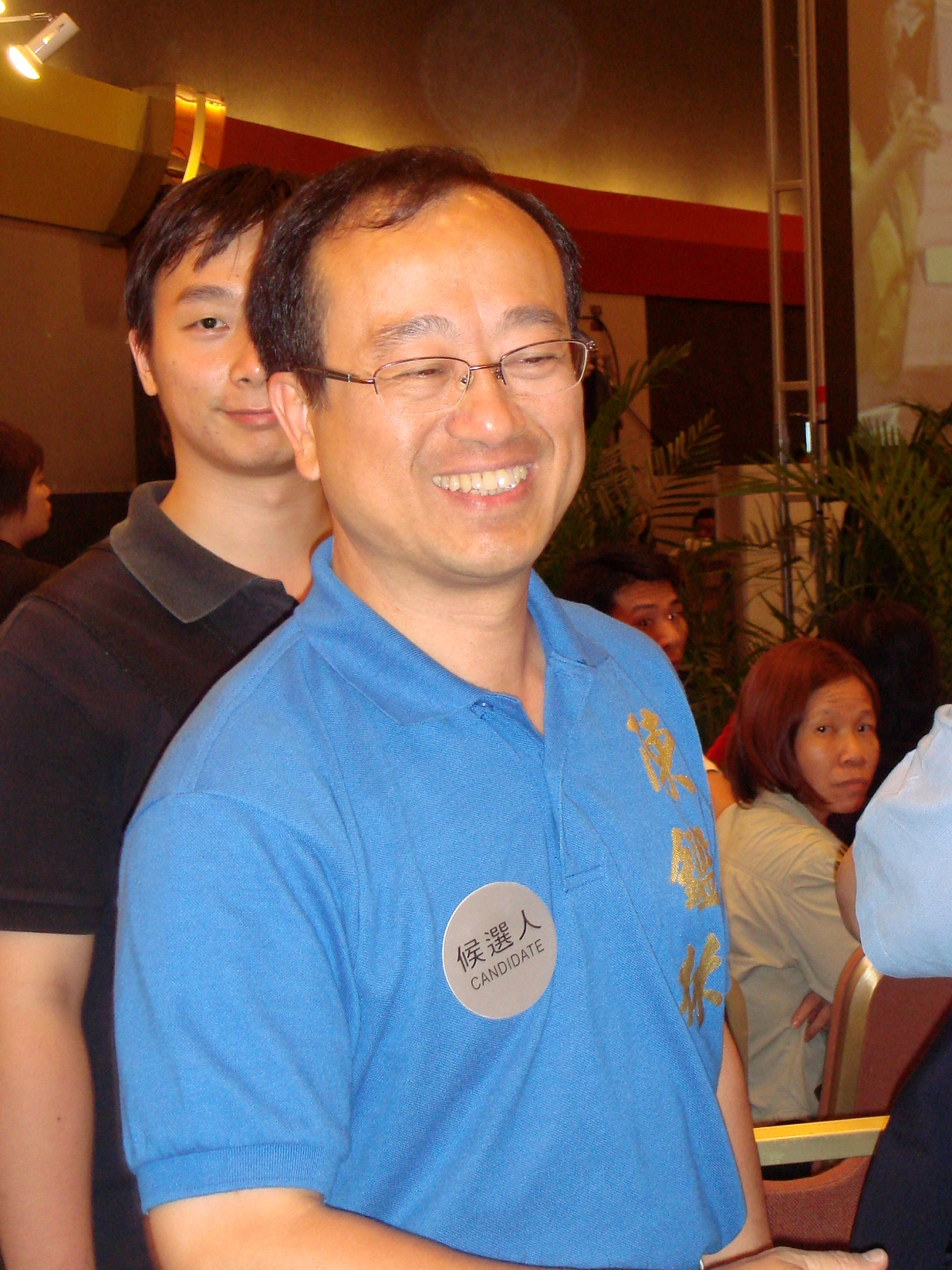

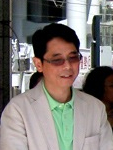

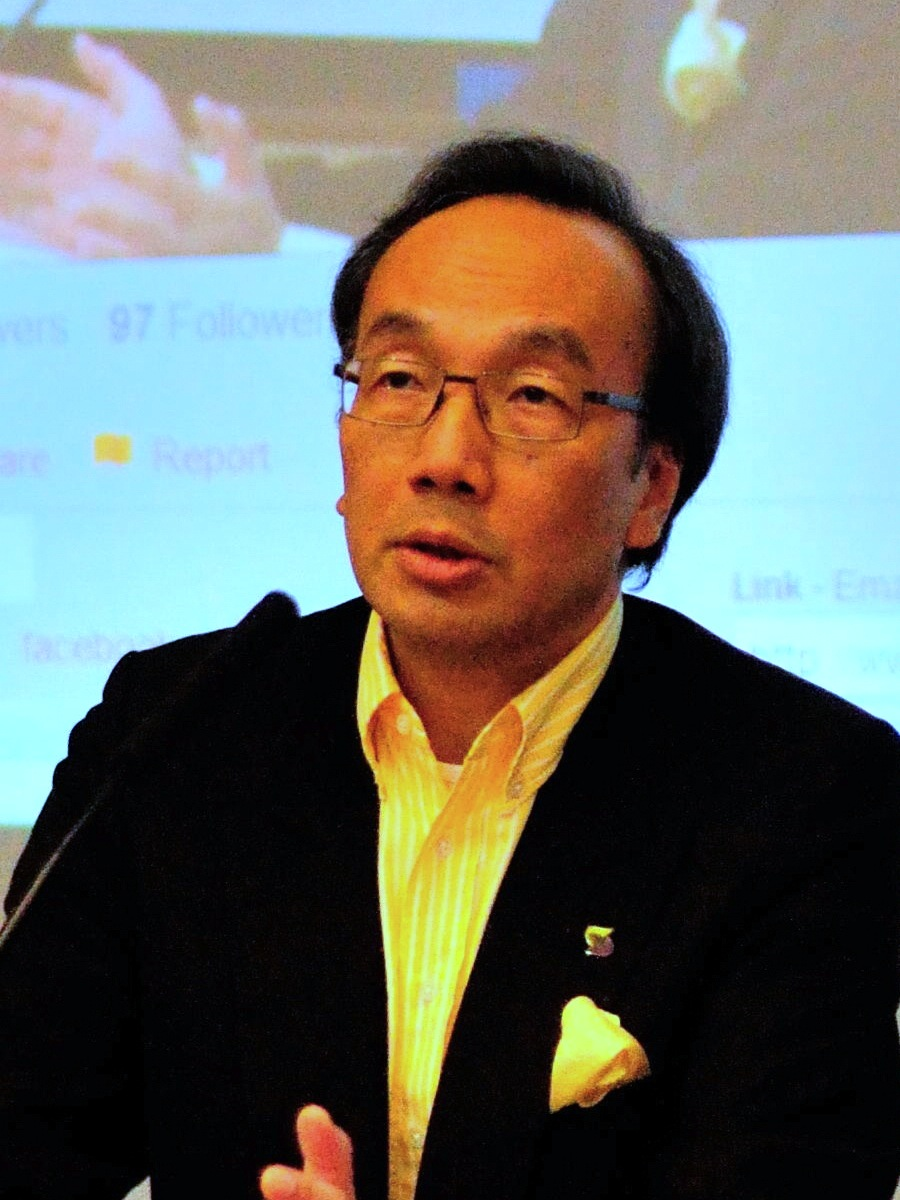
	First party	Second party
Leader	Fred Li & Wu Chi-wai	Chan Kam-lam
Party	Democratic	DAB
Alliance	Pan-democracy	Pro-Beijing
Last election	1 seat, 19.2%	1 seat, 18.8%
Seats before	1	1
Seats won	1	1
Seat change	Steady	Steady
Popular vote	64,489	53,472
Percentage	27.3%	22.6%
Swing	▲8.1%	▲3.8%
	Third party	Fourth party
Leader	Wong Kwok-kin	Alan Leong
Party	FTU	Civic
Alliance	Pro-Beijing	Pan-democracy
Last election	1 seat, 17.9%	1 seat, 19.1%
Seats before	1	1
Seats won	1	1
Seat change	Steady	Steady
Popular vote	50,320	39,274
Percentage	21.3%	16.6%
Swing	▲3.4%	▼2.5%
- Party with most votes in each District Council Constituency.

These are the Kowloon East results of the 2008 Hong Kong legislative election. The election was held on 7 September 2008 and all 4 seats in Kowloon East where consisted of Wong Tai Sin District and Kwun Tong District were contested, after one seat was abolished. The Democratic Party's Fred Li, Democratic Alliance for the Betterment and Progress of Hong Kong's Chan Kam-lam and Civic Party's Alan Leong each secured their party's incumbent seat, and Federation of Trade Unions's Wong Kwok-kin replaced retiring Chan Yuen-han.

== Overall results ==
Before election:

↓
3	2
Pan-democracy	Pro-Beijing

Change in composition:

↓
2	2
Pan-democracy	Pro-Beijing

Party	Seats	Seats change	Contesting list(s)	Votes	%	% change
Democratic	1	0	2	64,489	27.3	+8.1
Civic	1	0	1	39,274	16.6	−2.5
LSD	0	0	1	28,690	12.1	−2.5
Pro-democracy camp	2	0	4	132,453	56.1	–7.2
DAB	1	0	1	53,472	22.6	+3.8
FTU	1	0	1	50,320	21.3	+3.4
Pro-Beijing camp	2	0	2	103,792	43.9	+7.2
Turnout:				236,245	44.0	

== Candidates list ==
Legislative Election 2008: Kowloon East
List	Candidates	Votes	Of total (%)	± from prev.
DAB	Chan Kam-lam Joe Lai Wing-ho, Maggie Chan Man-ki, Hung Kam-in	53,472	22.6	+3.8
FTU	Wong Kwok-kin Chan Yuen-han, Peter Wong Kit-hin, Kan Ming-tung	50,320	21.3	+3.4
Democratic	Fred Li Wah-ming Kai Ming-wah, Wong Kai-ming, Wong Wai-tag	48,124	20.4	+1.2
Civic	Alan Leong Kah-kit Yu Kwun-wai, Wong Hok-ming	39,274	16.6	−2.5
LSD	Andrew To Kwan-hang	28,690	12.1	−12.9
Democratic	Wu Chi-wai	16,365	6.9	N/A
Total valid votes		236,245	100.00	
Rejected ballots		1,691		
Turnout		237,936	44.01	−12.45
Registered electors		540,649		

== See also ==
- Legislative Council of Hong Kong
- Hong Kong legislative elections
- 2008 Hong Kong legislative election
