= 2004 Hong Kong legislative election in Kowloon East =

- 12 September 2004

All 5 Kowloon East seats to the Legislative Council
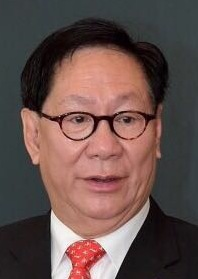

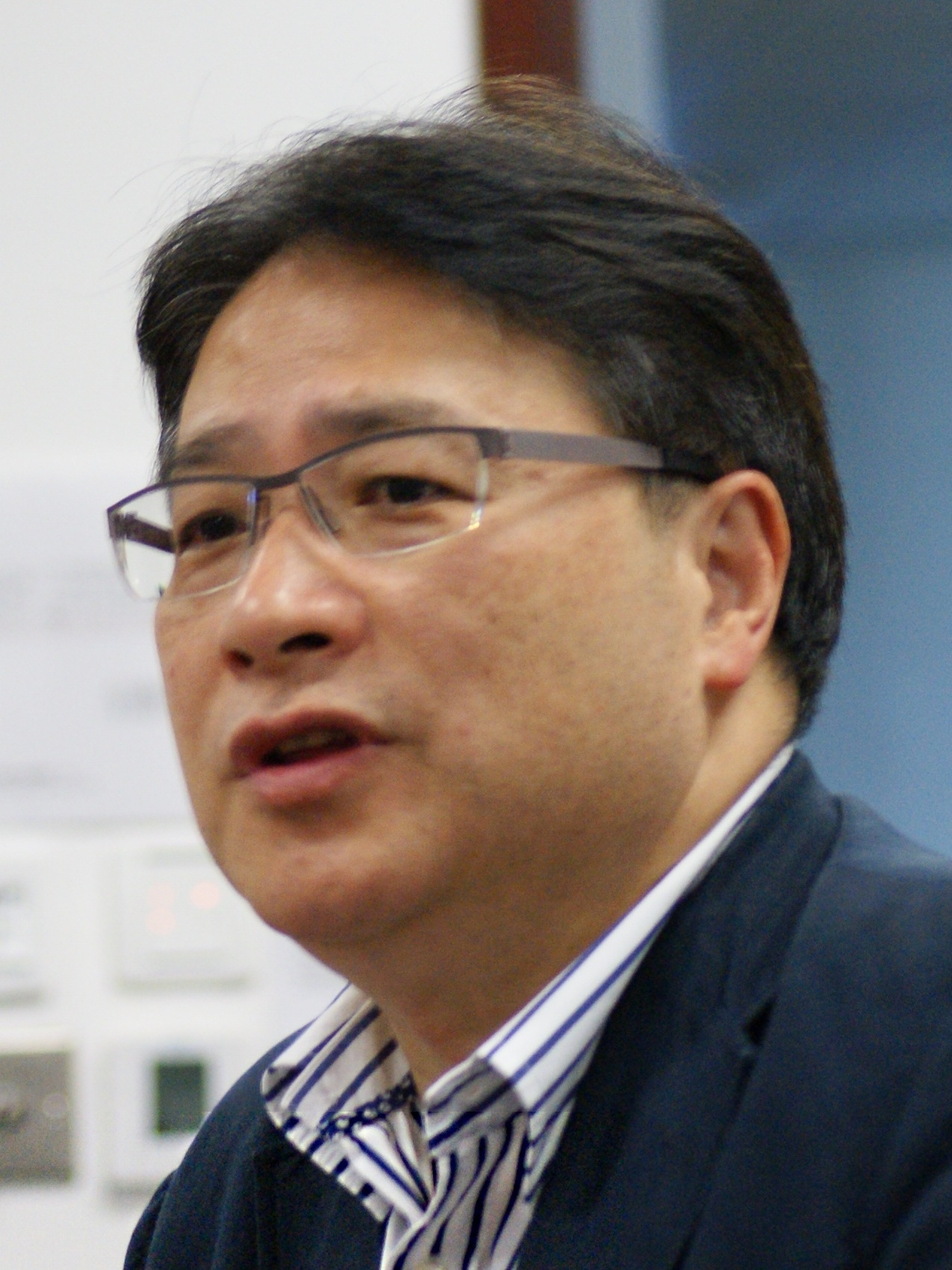

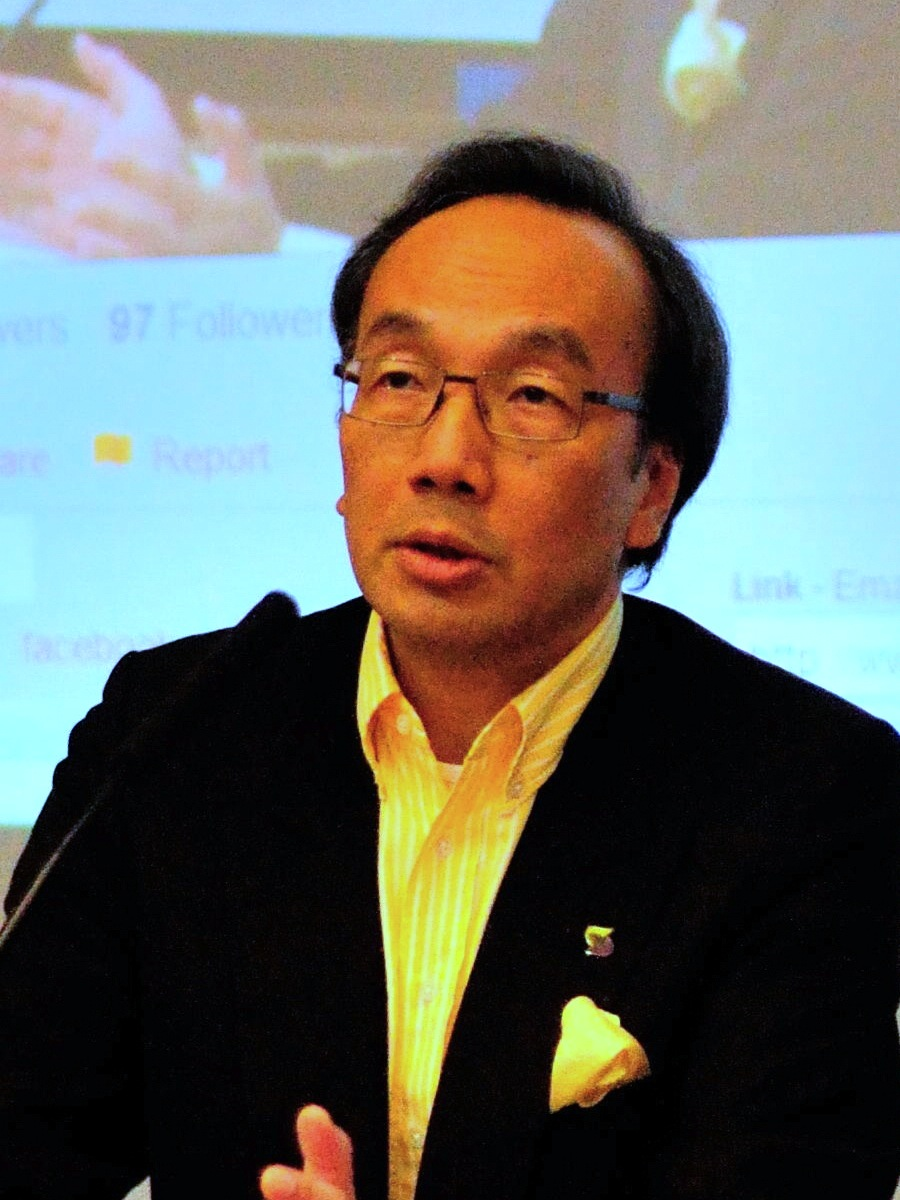

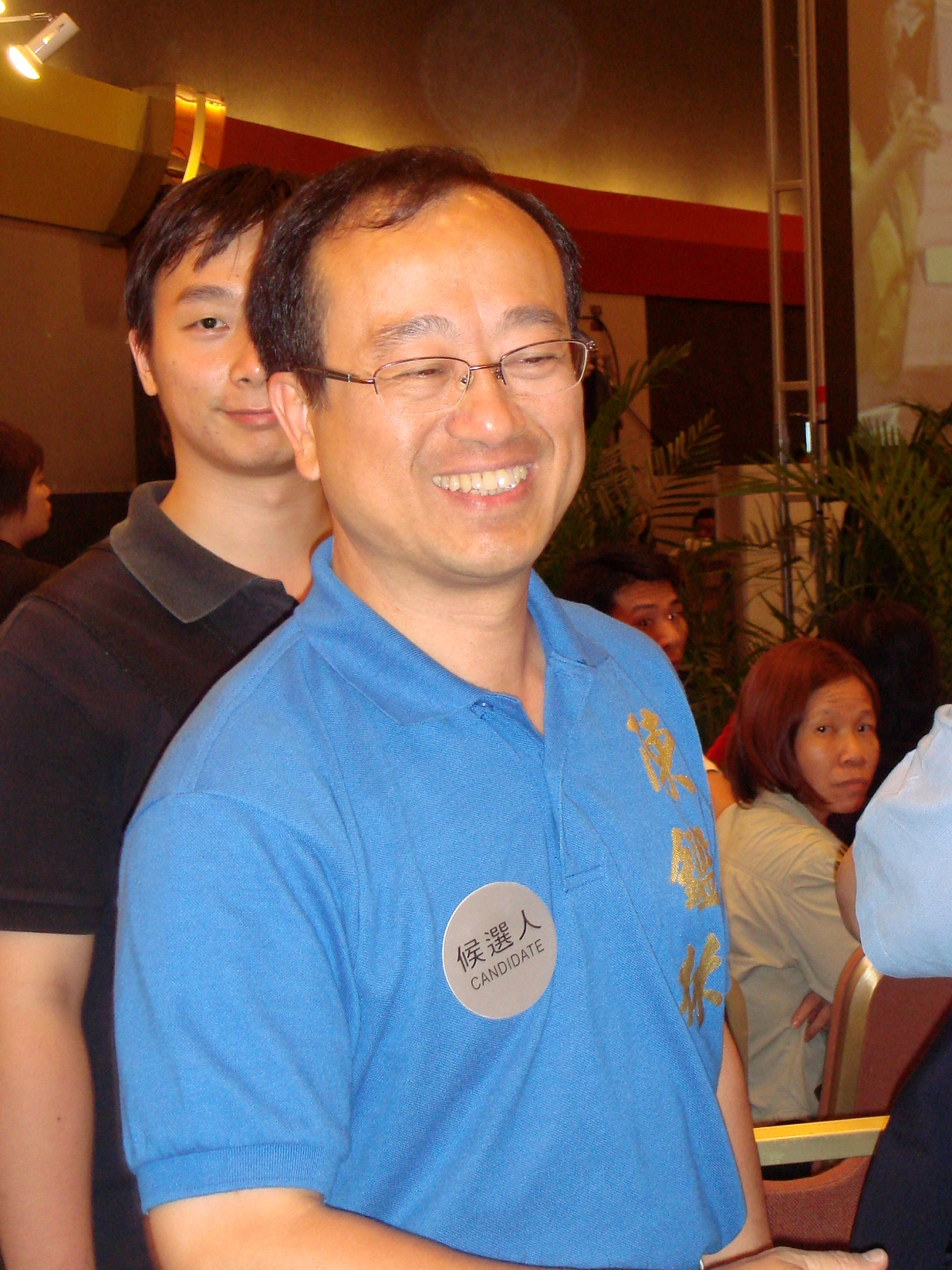

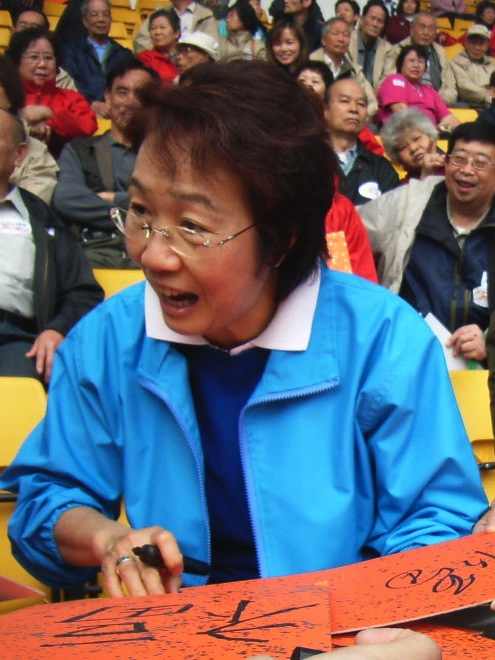
	First party	Second party	Third party
Leader	Albert Cheng (Independent)	Fred Li	Alan Leong
Party	Frontier	Democratic	Independent
Alliance	Pro-democracy	Pro-democracy	Pro-democracy
Last election	Did not contest	1 seat, 19.2%	No seat
Seats before	0	1	0
Seats won	1	1	1
Seat change	▲1	Steady	▲1
Popular vote	73,279	56,462	56,175
Percentage	25.0%	19.2%	19.1%
Swing	N/A	▼26.1%	N/A
	Fourth party	Fifth party
Leader	Chan Kam-lam	Chan Yuen-han
Party	DAB	FTU
Alliance	Pro-Beijing	Pro-Beijing
Last election	1 seat, 18.8%	Did not contest
Seats before	1	1
Seats won	1	1
Seat change	Steady	Steady
Popular vote	55,306	52,564
Percentage	18.8%	17.9%
Swing	▼28.6%	N/A
- Party with most votes in each District Council Constituency.

These are the Kowloon East results of the 2004 Hong Kong legislative election. The election was held on 12 September 2004 and all 5 seats in Kowloon East where consisted of Wong Tai Sin District and Kwun Tong District were contested. All four incumbents were elected with famous pro-democrat radio host Albert Cheng won a new seat with Andrew To of The Frontier on a joint ticket.

== Overall results ==
Before election:

↓
2	2
Pro-democracy	Pro-Beijing

Change in composition:

↓
3	2
Pro-democracy	Pro-Beijing

Party	Seats	Seats change	Contesting list(s)	Votes	%	% change
Frontier	0	0	1	73,279	25.0	N/A
Democratic	1	0	1	56,462	19.2	–26.1
Independent	1	0	1	56,175	19.1	N/A
Pro-democracy camp	3	+1	3	185,916	63.2	+17.9
DAB	1	0	1	55,306	18.8	–28.6
FTU	1	0	1	52,564	17.9	N/A
Pro-Beijing camp	2	0	2	107,870	36.7	–10.7
Turnout:				293,986	56.5	

== Candidates list ==
Legislative Election 2004: Kowloon East
List	Candidates	Votes	Of total (%)	± from prev.
Nonpartisan (Frontier)	Albert Cheng Jing-han Andrew To Kwan-hang	73,279	25.0 (20+4.99)	N/A
Democratic	Fred Li Wah-ming Wu Chi-wai, Ho Wai-to	56,462	19.2	−26.1
Independent	Alan Leong Kah-kit	56,175	19.1	N/A
DAB (FTU)	Chan Kam-lam Choi Chun-wa, Chan Tak-ming	55,306	18.8	N/A
FTU (DAB)	Chan Yuen-han Lam Man-fai, Tang Ka-piu	52,564	17.9	N/A
Total valid votes		293,986	100.00	
Rejected ballots		2,384		
Turnout		296,370	56.46	+11.74
Registered electors		524,896		

== See also ==
- Legislative Council of Hong Kong
- Hong Kong legislative elections
- 2004 Hong Kong legislative election
