= 2000 Hong Kong legislative election in Kowloon East =

- 10 September 2000

All 4 Kowloon East seats to the Legislative Council
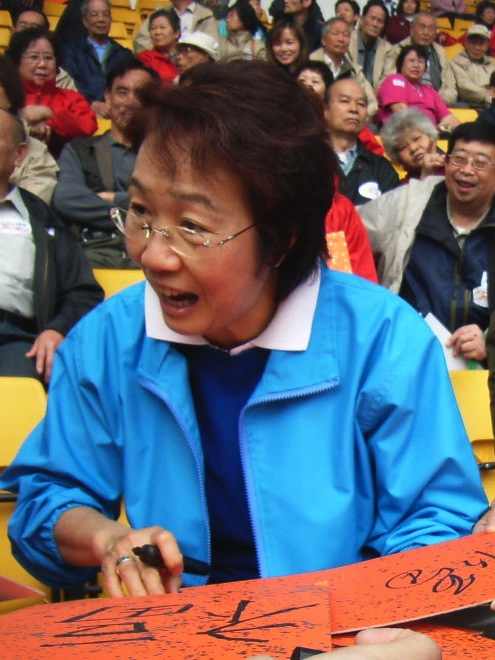

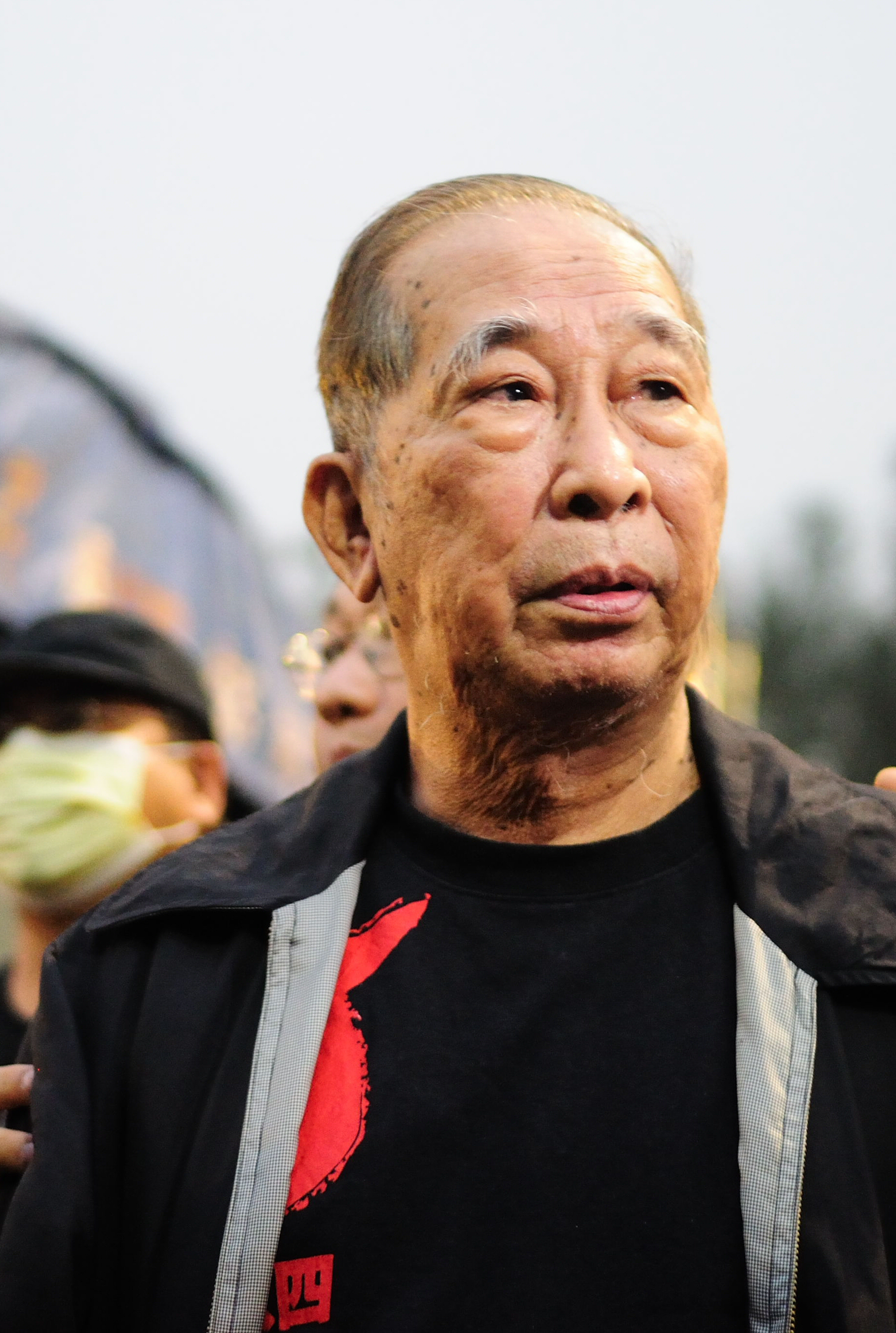
	First party	Second party
Leader	Chan Yuen-han	Szeto Wah
Party	DAB	Democratic
Alliance	Pro-Beijing camp	Pro-democracy camp
Last election	1 seat, 41.8%	2 seats, 55.8%
Seats before	1	2
Seats won	2	2
Seat change	▲1	Steady
Popular vote	108,587	103,863
Percentage	47.4%	45.3%
Swing	▲5.6%	▼10.5%

These are the Kowloon East results of the 2000 Hong Kong legislative election. The election was held on 10 September 2000 and all 4 seats in Kowloon East which consisted of Wong Tai Sin District and Kwun Tong District were contested. The Democratic Alliance for the Betterment of Hong Kong received more votes than the Democratic Party for the first time, with Chan Kam-lam getting elected.

== Overall results ==
Before election:

↓
2	1
Pro-democracy	Pro-Beijing

Change in composition:

↓
2	2
Pro-democracy	Pro-Beijing

Party	Seats	Seats change	Contesting list(s)	Votes	%	% change
DAB	2	+1	1	108,587	47.4	+5.6
Democratic	2	0	1	103,863	45.3	–10.5
Independent or others	0	0	2	16,828	7.4	N/A
Turnout:				229,278	44.7	

== Candidates list ==
Legislative Election 2000: Kowloon East
List	Candidates	Votes	Of total (%)	± from prev.
DAB	Chan Yuen-han, Chan Kam-lam Lam Man-fai, Angelis Chan Joy-kong	108,587	47.4 (25+22.36)	+5.62
Democratic	Szeto Wah, Fred Li Wah-ming Wu Chi-wai, Andrew To Kwan-hang	103,863	45.3 (25+20.3)	−10.5
Nonpartisan	Lam Hoi-shing	9,805	4.3	N/A
Nonpartisan	Shi Kai-biu, Lam Wai-yin	7,023	3.1	N/A
Total valid votes		229,278	100.00	
Rejected ballots		2,384		
Turnout		296,370	44.72	–9.69
Registered electors		518,035		

== See also ==
- Legislative Council of Hong Kong
- Hong Kong legislative elections
- 2000 Hong Kong legislative election
