= 1998 Hong Kong legislative election in Kowloon East =

- 24 May 1998

All 3 Kowloon East seats to the Legislative Council
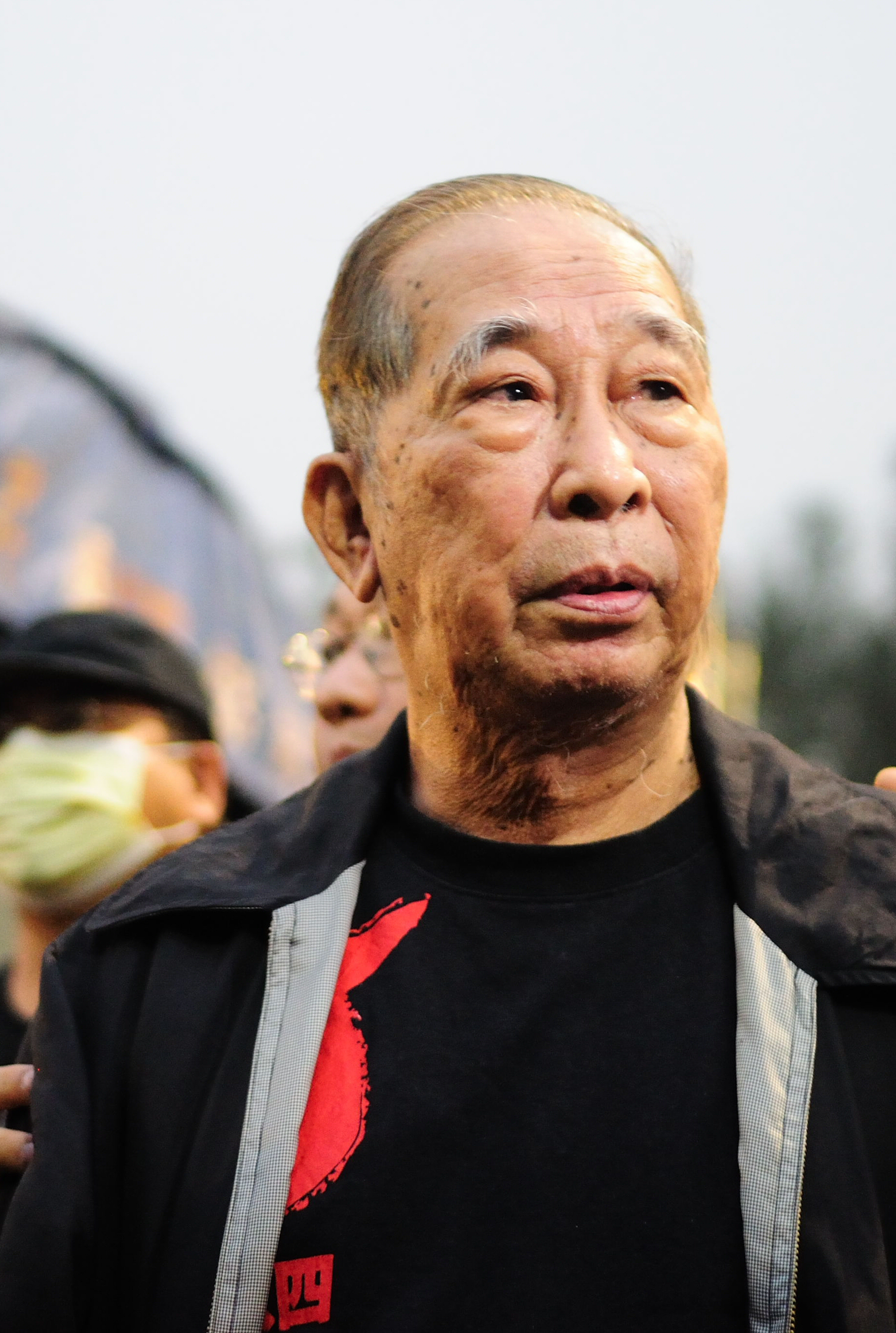

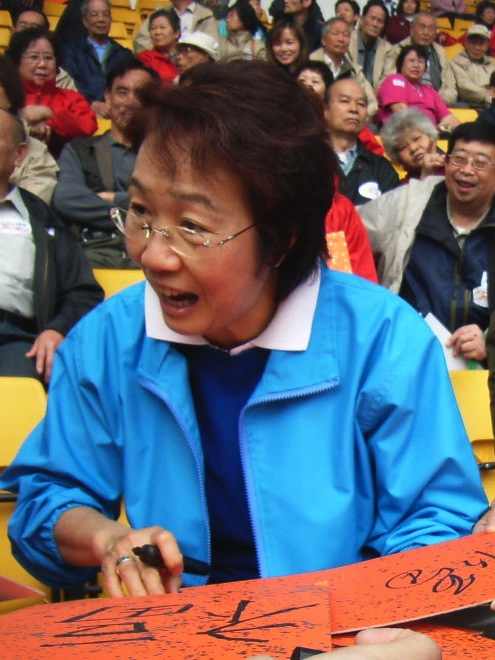
	First party	Second party
Leader	Szeto Wah	Chan Yuen-han
Party	Democratic	DAB
Alliance	Pro-democracy camp	Pro-Beijing camp
Seats won	2	1
Popular vote	145,986	109,296
Percentage	55.8%	41.8%

These are the Kowloon East results of the 1998 Hong Kong legislative election. The election was held on 24 May 1998 and all 3 seats in Kowloon East where consisted of Wong Tai Sin District and Kwun Tong District were contested. The Szeto Wah-led Democratic Party won two seats, with Fred Li got elected, while Chan Yuen-han of the Democratic Alliance for the Betterment of Hong Kong was also elected.

== Overall results ==
After election:

↓
2	1
Pro-democracy	Pro-Beijing

Party	Seats	Contesting list(s)	Votes	%
Democratic	2	1	145,986	55.8
DAB	1	1	109,296	41.8
Independent or others	0	1	6,339	2.4
Turnout:			261,621	54.4

== Candidates list ==
Legislative Election 1998: Kowloon East
List	Candidates	Votes	Of total (%)	± from prev.
Democratic	Szeto Wah, Fred Li Wah-ming Mak Hoi-wah	145,986	55.80 (33.33+22.47)	
DAB	Chan Yuen-han Kwok Bit-chun, Lam Man-fai	109,296	41.78 (33.33+8.45)	
Nonpartisan	Fok Pui-yee	6,339	2.42	
Total valid votes		261,621	100.00	
Rejected ballots		1,679		
Turnout		263,300	54.41	
Registered electors		483,875		

== See also ==
- Legislative Council of Hong Kong
- Hong Kong legislative elections
- 1998 Hong Kong legislative election
