= Kowloon East (1998 constituency) =

Geographical constituency in Hong Kong

- Former Geographical constituency for the Legislative Council of Hong Kong
- Boundary of Kowloon East in Hong Kong
- District: Wong Tai Sin District; Kwun Tong District
- Region: Kowloon
- Population: 1,120,800 (2020)
- Electorate: 709,237 (2020)

Former constituency
- Created: 1998
- Abolished: 2021
- Number of members: Three (1998–2000); Four (2000–2004; 2008–2012); Five (2004–2008; 2012–2021)
- Created from: Kowloon South-east, Kowloon East (1995), Kowloon North-east
- Replaced by: Kowloon Central (2021); Kowloon East (2021)

The Kowloon East geographical constituency was one of the five geographical constituencies in the Legislative Council of Hong Kong from 1998 to 2021. It was established in 1998 for the first SAR Legislative Council election and was abolished under the 2021 overhaul of the Hong Kong electoral system. In the 2016 Legislative Council election, it elected five members of the Legislative Council using the Hare quota of party-list proportional representation. The constituency corresponded to the today's districts of Wong Tai Sin and Kwun Tong.

== History ==
The single-constituency single-vote system was replaced by the proportional representation system for the first SAR Legislative Council election designed by Beijing to reward the weaker pro-Beijing candidates and dilute the electoral strength of the majority pro-democrats. Three seats were allocated to Kowloon East, with the Democratic Party taking two seats, represented by Szeto Wah and Fred Li and the pro-Beijing Democratic Alliance for the Betterment of Hong Kong (DAB) taking one seat, represented by Chan Yuen-han.

In the 2000 Legislative Council election, one more seat were allocated to Kowloon East. The DAB ticket was able to win two seats with Chan Yuen-han's popularity carried Chan Kam-lam through, with the popular votes even exceeding the Democratic ticket. One more seat was added in the 2004 election, where former pro-democracy radio host Albert Cheng swept the votes with nearly a quarter of the vote share, while pro-democracy barrister Alan Leong also won a seat, replacing Szeto Wah who was retiring.

The constituency was reduced to four seats due to the reapportionment in the 2008 Legislative Council election. With Albert Cheng stepping down from the office, the seats were divided by Chan Kam-lam of the DAB, Wong Kwok-kin of the Hong Kong Federation of Trade Unions (FTU) who was succeeding Chan Yuen-han, Fredi Li of the Democratic Party and Alan Leong of the Civic Party. Leong resigned from the legislature to launch the "Five Constituencies Referendum" in 2010 to pressure the government over the 2012 constitutional reform proposal, but was re-elected with a low turnout due to the government and pro-Beijing boycott.

Kowloon East was given back five seats in the 2012 Legislative Council election, with an extra seat being fought for between pro-Beijing independent Paul Tse and two radical democrats, Andrew To of the League of Social Democrats (LSD) and Wong Yeung-tat of the People Power. Tse eventually took the last seat with a thin margin due to the pro-democracy infighting, making the pro-Beijing camp winning the majority of the seats for the first time. The balance of power remained unchanged in the 2016 election, with Wu Chi-wai taking the torch from Fred Li one term earlier, and Wilson Or and Jeremy Tam succeeding Chan Kam-lam and Alan Leong respectively.

== Returned members ==
The following lists the members since the creation of the Kowloon East constituency. The number of seats allocated to Kowloon East varied between three and five between 1998 and 2016 due to reapportionment.

LegCo members for Kowloon East, 1998–2021
Term	Election	Member	Member	Member	Member	Member
1st	1998	Szeto Wah (DP)	Chan Yuen-han (DAB→FTU)	Fred Li (DP)		
2nd	2000	Szeto Wah (DP)	Chan Yuen-han (DAB→FTU)	Fred Li (DP)	Chan Kam-lam (DAB)	
3rd	2004	Albert Cheng (Ind)	Chan Yuen-han (DAB→FTU)	Fred Li (DP)	Chan Kam-lam (DAB)	Alan Leong (A45→CP)
4th	2008	Seat abolished	Wong Kwok-kin (FTU)	Fred Li (DP)	Chan Kam-lam (DAB)	Alan Leong (A45→CP)
4th	2008	Seat abolished	Wong Kwok-kin (FTU)	Fred Li (DP)	Chan Kam-lam (DAB)	Vacant
4th	2010 (b)	Seat abolished	Wong Kwok-kin (FTU)	Fred Li (DP)	Chan Kam-lam (DAB)	Alan Leong (A45→CP)
5th	2012	Paul Tse (Ind)	Wong Kwok-kin (FTU)	Wu Chi-wai (DP)	Chan Kam-lam (DAB)	Alan Leong (A45→CP)
6th	2016	Paul Tse (Ind)	Wong Kwok-kin (FTU)	Wu Chi-wai (DP)	Wilson Or (DAB)	Jeremy Tam (CP)
6th	2016	Paul Tse (Ind)	Wong Kwok-kin (FTU)	Vacant	Wilson Or (DAB)	Vacant

=== Summary of seats won ===
Term	Election	Distribution
1st	1998	2 / 1
2nd	2000	2 / 2
3rd	2004	3 / 2
4th	2008	2 / 2
5th	2012	2 / 3
6th	2016	2 / 3

	1998	2000	2004	2008	2012	2016
Democratic	2	2	1	1	1	1
DAB	1	2	1	1	1	1
FTU			1	1	1	1
Civic				1	1	1
Independent			2		1	1
Pro-democracy	2	2	3	2	2	2
Pro-Beijing	1	2	2	2	3	3
Seats	3	4	5	4	5	5

=== Vote share summary ===
	1998	2000	2004	2008	2012	2016
Democratic	55.8	45.3	19.2	27.3	15.4	15.3
DAB	41.8	47.4	18.8	22.6	16.7	15.7
FTU			17.9	21.3	14.3	14.4
Civic				16.6	14.6	13.8
LSD				12.1	9.6	
People Power					12.9	9.7
Civic Passion						10.1
KEC						3.9
Independent and Others	2.4	7.4	44.1		16.6	17.2
Pro-democracy	55.8	45.3	63.3	56.0	55.5	54.8
Pro-Beijing	41.8	47.4	36.7	43.9	44.5	45.2

== Election results ==
The largest remainder method (with Hare quota) of the proportional representative electoral system was introduced in 1998, replacing the single-member constituencies of the 1995 election. Elected candidates are shown in bold. Brackets indicate the quota + remainder.

=== 2010s ===

↓
**1**	**1**	**1**	**1**	**1**

Vote share
1. DAB (15.7%)
2. Democratic (15.3%)
3. FTU (14.4%)
4. Civic (13.8%)
5. Civic Passion (10.1%)
6. People Power (9.67%)
7. KEC (3.91%)
8. Frontier (0.79%)
9. VLHK (0.74%)
10. Other (15.7%)

2016 Legislative Council election: Kowloon East
List	Candidates	Votes	Of total (%)	± from prev.
**Quota**		65,799	20.00	
DAB	**Wilson Or Chong-shing** Joe Lai Wing-ho, Jack Cheung Ki-tang	51,516	15.66	–0.99
Democratic	**Wu Chi-wai** Mok Kin-shing, Cheng Keng-ieong, Wu Chi-kin	50,309	15.29	–0.08
Nonpartisan	**Paul Tse Wai-chun**	47,527	14.45	+0.91
FTU	**Wong Kwok-kin** Chow Luen-kiu, Kan Ming-tung, Kwok Wang-hing	47,318	14.38	+0.04
Civic	**Jeremy Jansen Tam Man-ho** Alan Leong Kah-kit	45,408	13.80	–0.83
Civic Passion	Wong Yeung-tat	33,271	10.11	N/A
People Power	Tam Tak-chi	31,815	9.67	–3.18
KEC	Chan Chak-to	12,854	3.91	N/A
Frontier	Tam Heung-man	2,603	0.79	–1.17
Labour	Wu Sui-shan, Chiu Shi-shun	2,535	0.77	N/A
VLHK	Patrick Ko Tat-pun	2,444	0.74	N/A
Nonpartisan	Lui Wing-kei	1,393	0.42	N/A
Total valid votes		328,993	100.00	
Rejected ballots		7,754		
Turnout		336,738	55.98	+4.01
Registered electors		601,566		

↓
**1**	**1**	**1**	**1**	**1**

Vote share
1. DAB (16.6%)
2. Democratic (15.4%)
3. Civic (14.6%)
4. FTU (14.3%)
5. People Power (12.8%)
6. LSD (9.57%)
7. Other (16.6%)

2012 Legislative Council election: Kowloon East
List	Candidates	Votes	Of total (%)	± from prev.
**Quota**		56,957	20.00	
DAB	**Chan Kam-lam** Joe Lai Wing-ho, Hung Kam-in, Wilson Or Chong-shing	47,415	16.65	−5.95
Democratic	**Wu Chi-wai** Mok Kin-shing, Hon Ka-ming	43,764	15.37	−5.03
Civic	**Alan Leong Kah-kit** Jeremy Jansen Tam Man-ho	41,669	14.63	−1.97
FTU	**Wong Kwok-kin** Kan Ming-tung, Mok Kin-wing, Ho Kai-ming	40,824	14.34	−6.96
Independent	**Paul Tse Wai-chun**	38,546	13.54	N/A
People Power	Wong Yeung-tat, Chan Sau-wai	36,608	12.85	N/A
LSD	Andrew To Kwan-hang	27,253	9.57	−2.68
Independent	Tam Heung-man	5,440	1.91	N/A
Nonpartisan	Kay Yim Fung-chi, Chan Heung-yin	3,263	1.15	N/A
Total valid votes		284,782	100.00	
Rejected ballots		5,979		
Turnout		290,761	51.97	+9.12
Registered electors		559,528		

2010 Kowloon East by-election
Party	Candidate	Votes	%	±%
**Civic**	**Alan Leong Kah-kit**	**82,066**	**92.53**	
Tertiary 2012	Lai King-fai	6,630	7.47	
Majority		75,436	85.05	
Total valid votes		88,696	100.00	
Rejected ballots		2,530		
Turnout		91,226	16.79	
Registered electors		543,253		
Civic **hold**		Swing		

=== 2000s ===

↓
**1**	**1**	**1**	**1**

Vote share
1. Democratic (27.3%)
2. DAB (22.6%)
3. FTU (21.3%)
4. Civic (16.6%)
5. LSD (12.2%)

2008 Legislative Council election: Kowloon East
List	Candidates	Votes	Of total (%)	± from prev.
**Quota**		59,061	25.00	
DAB	**Chan Kam-lam** Joe Lai Wing-ho, Maggie Chan Man-ki, Hung Kam-in	53,472	22.63	+3.82
FTU	**Wong Kwok-kin** Chan Yuen-han, Peter Wong Kit-hin, Kan Ming-tung	50,320	21.30	+3.42
Democratic	**Fred Li Wah-ming** Kai Ming-wah, Wong Kai-ming, Wong Wai-tag	48,124	20.37	+1.16
Civic	**Alan Leong Kah-kit** Yu Kwun-wai, Wong Hok-ming	39,274	16.62	−2.49
LSD	Andrew To Kwan-hang	28,690	12.14	−12.79
Democratic	Wu Chi-wai	16,365	6.93	N/A
Total valid votes		236,245	100.00	
Rejected ballots		1,691		
Turnout		237,936	44.01	−12.45
Registered electors		540,649		

↓
**1**	**2**	**1**	**1**

Vote share
1. Democratic (19.2%)
2. DAB (18.8%)
3. FTU (17.9%)
4. Other (44.1%)

2004 Legislative Council election: Kowloon East
List	Candidates	Votes	Of total (%)	± from prev.
**Quota**		58,797	20.00	
Nonpartisan (Frontier)	**Albert Cheng Jing-han** Andrew To Kwan-hang	73,279	24.93 (20.00+4.93)	N/A
Democratic	**Fred Li Wah-ming** Wu Chi-wai, Ho Wai-to	56,462	19.21	−26.09
Independent	**Alan Leong Kah-kit**	56,175	19.11	N/A
DAB (FTU)	**Chan Kam-lam** Choi Chun-wa, Chan Tak-ming	55,306	18.81	N/A
FTU (DAB)	**Chan Yuen-han** Lam Man-fai, Tang Ka-piu	52,564	17.88	N/A
Total valid votes		293,986	100.00	
Rejected ballots		2,384		
Turnout		296,370	56.46	+11.74
Registered electors		524,896		

↓
**2**	**2**

Vote share
1. DAB (47.4%)
2. Democratic (45.3%)
3. Other (7.30%)

2000 Legislative Council election: Kowloon East
List	Candidates	Votes	Of total (%)	± from prev.
**Quota**		57,320	25.00	
DAB	**Chan Yuen-han, Chan Kam-lam** Lam Man-fai, Angelis Chan Joy-kong	108,587	47.36 (25+22.36)	+5.62
Democratic	**Szeto Wah, Fred Li Wah-ming** Wu Chi-wai, Andrew To Kwan-hang	103,863	45.30 (25+20.30)	−10.50
Nonpartisan	Lam Hoi-shing	9,805	4.28	N/A
Nonpartisan	Shi Kai-biu, Lam Wai-yin	7,023	3.06	N/A
Total valid votes		229,278	100.00	
Rejected ballots		2,384		
Turnout		296,370	44.72	–9.69
Registered electors		518,035		

=== 1990s ===
↓
**2**	**1**

Vote share
1. Democratic (55.8%)
2. DAB (41.8%)
3. Other (2.40%)

1998 Legislative Council election: Kowloon East
List	Candidates	Votes	Of total (%)	± from prev.
**Quota**		87,207	33.33	
Democratic	**Szeto Wah, Fred Li Wah-ming** Mak Hoi-wah	145,986	55.80 (33.33+22.47)	
DAB	**Chan Yuen-han** Kwok Bit-chun, Lam Man-fai	109,296	41.78 (33.33+8.45)	
Nonpartisan	Fok Pui-yee	6,339	2.42	
Total valid votes		261,621	100.00	
Rejected ballots		1,679		
Turnout		263,300	54.41	
Registered electors		483,875		

== See also ==
- List of constituencies of Hong Kong
