= Kowloon South-east (1995 constituency) =

- Former Geographical constituency for the Legislative Council of Hong Kong
- Boundary of Kowloon South-east in Hong Kong
- District: Kwun Tong District
- Region: Kowloon
- Electorate: 134,826

Former constituency
- Created: 1995
- Abolished: 1997
- Created from: Kowloon East
- Replaced by: Kowloon East

Kowloon South-east was a geographical constituencies in the election for the Legislative Council of Hong Kong in 1995, which elects one member of the Legislative Council using the first-past-the-post voting system. The constituency covers Kwun Tong District in Kowloon.

The constituency was replaced by the Kowloon East constituency in 1998 after the handover of Hong Kong a year before.

== Returned members ==
Elected members are as follows:

Election	Member	Party
1995	Fred Li	Democratic

== Election results ==
1995 Legislative Council election: Kowloon South-east
Party	Candidate	Votes	%	±%
Democratic	Li Wah-ming	30,133	50.95	
DAB (FTU)	Tam Yiu-chung	29,009	49.05	
Majority		1,124	1.90	
Total valid votes		58,142	100.00	
Rejected ballots		584		
Turnout		58,726	43.56	
Registered electors		134,826		
Democratic win (new seat)				
