= Kowloon East (1991 constituency) =

- Former Geographical constituency for the Legislative Council of Hong Kong
- Boundary of Kowloon East in Hong Kong
- District: Yau Tsim District; Mong Kok District; Sham Shui Po District
- Region: Kowloon
- Electorate: 217,117

Former constituency
- Created: 1991
- Abolished: 1995
- Number of members: Two
- Replaced by: Kowloon East; Kowloon South-east

Kowloon East was a geographical constituency in the election for the Legislative Council of Hong Kong in 1991, which elects two members of the Legislative Council using the dual-seat constituency dual vote system. The constituency covers Yau Tsim District, Mong Kok District, and Sham Shui Po District in Kowloon.

The constituency was divided and replaced by the Kowloon East and Kowloon South-east constituencies in 1995.

== Returned members ==
Elected members are as follows:

Election	Member	Party	Member	Party
1991	Szeto Wah	UDHK	Fred Li	MP
1994	Szeto Wah	Democratic	Fred Li	Democratic

== Election results ==
1991 Legislative Council election: Kowloon East
Party	Candidate	Votes	%	±%
United Democrats	Szeto Wah	57,921	37.83	
Meeting Point	Fred Li Wah-ming	49,643	32.42	
KTRA	Hau Shui-pui	21,225	13.86	
Independent	Poon Chi-fai	16,625	10.86	
October Review	Chan Cheong	3,431	2.24	
TUC	Li Ting-kit	3,393	2.22	
LDF	Philip Li Koi-hop	865	0.56	
Turnout		82,405	37.95	
Registered electors		217,117		
United Democrats win (new seat)				
Meeting Point win (new seat)				
