= Kowloon East (1995 constituency) =

- Former Geographical constituency for the Legislative Council of Hong Kong
- Boundary of Kowloon East in Hong Kong
- District: Kwun Tong District
- Region: Kowloon
- Electorate: 129,955

Former constituency
- Created: 1995
- Abolished: 1997
- Created from: Kowloon East
- Replaced by: Kowloon East

Kowloon East was a geographical constituency in the election for the Legislative Council of Hong Kong in 1995, which elects one member of the Legislative Council using the first-past-the-post voting system. The constituency covers Kwun Tong District in Kowloon.

The constituency was merged into the Kowloon East constituency in 1998 after the handover of Hong Kong a year before.

== Returned members ==
Elected members are as follows:

Election	Member	Party
1995	Szeto Wah	Democratic

== Election results ==
1995 Legislative Council election: Kowloon East
Party	Candidate	Votes	%	±%
Democratic	Szeto Wah	29,627	55.40	
Independent	Elsie Tu	23,855	44.60	
Majority		5,772	10.80	
Total valid votes		53,482	100.00	
Rejected ballots		350		
Turnout		53,832	41.42	
Registered electors		129,955		
Democratic win (new seat)				
