= Fred Li =

Fred Li Wah-ming
- 李華明
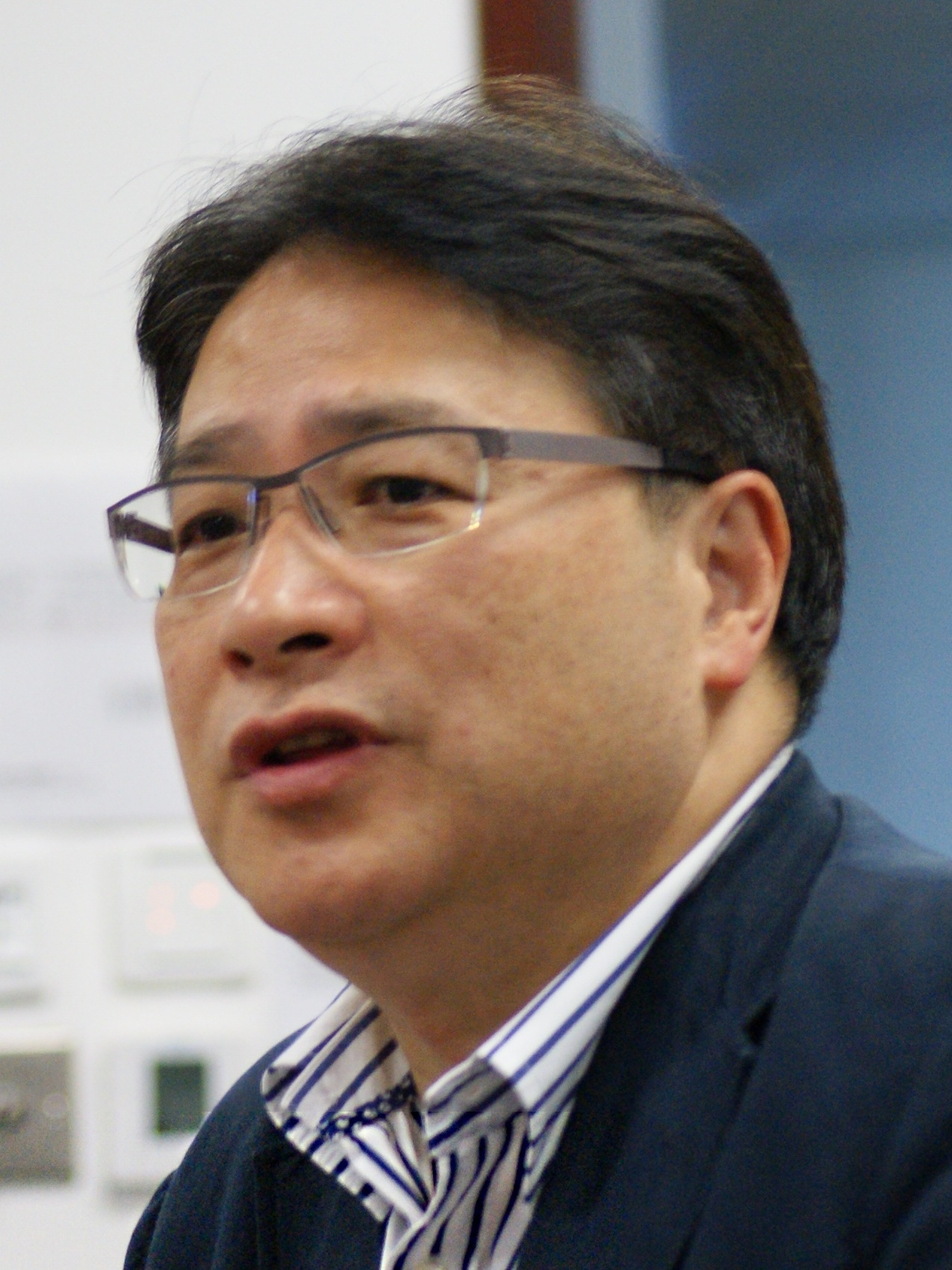
- Li in 2012

Member of the Legislative Council
- In office 9 October 1991 – 31 July 1995
- Preceded by: New seat
- Succeeded by: Constituency abolished
- Constituency: Kowloon East
- In office 11 October 1995 – 30 June 1997
- Preceded by: New constituency
- Succeeded by: Replaced by Provisional Legislative Council
- Constituency: Kowloon South-east
- In office 1 July 1998 – 30 September 2012
- Preceded by: New parliament
- Succeeded by: Wu Chi-wai
- Constituency: Kowloon East

Personal details
- Born: 25 April 1955 (age 70) Hong Kong
- Party: Democratic Party
- Other political affiliations: Meeting Point (until 1994)
- Spouse: Lorine Yip
- Occupation: Social worker Legislative Councillor

Fred Li Wah-ming SBS JP (Chinese: 李華明; born 25 April 1955, Hong Kong) is a former member of the Legislative Council of Hong Kong representing the constituency of Kowloon East. He was a member of the Kwun Tong District Council for Tsui Ping.

He was a social worker before being a legislator. He is a member of the Hong Kong Democratic Party.

== Views, policy positions and Legco voting ==
In June 2010, he voted with the party in favour of the government's 2012 constitutional reform package, which included the late amendment by the Democratic Party – accepted by the Beijing government – to hold a popular vote for five new District Council functional constituencies.

== Citations ==
Legislative Council of Hong Kong
New seat	Member of Legislative Council; Representative for Kowloon East; 1991–1995; Served alongside: Szeto Wah	Succeeded by Himself as Representative for Kowloon South-east
Preceded by Himself as Representative for Kowloon East	Member of Legislative Council; Representative for Kowloon South-east; 1995–1997	Replaced by Provisional Legislative Council
New seat	Member of Legislative Council; Representative for Kowloon East; 1998–2012; With: Szeto Wah (1998–2004); Chan Yuen Han (1998–2008); Chan Kam-lam (2000–2012); Albert Cheng (2004–2008); Alan Leong (2004–2012); Wong Kwok-kin (2008–2012)	Succeeded by Wu Chi-wai
