= Kowloon North-east (1995 constituency) =

Geographical constituency in 1995

- Former Geographical constituency for the Legislative Council of Hong Kong
- Boundary of Kowloon North-east in Hong Kong
- District: Wong Tai Sin District
- Region: Kowloon
- Electorate: 106,296

Former constituency
- Created: 1995
- Abolished: 1997
- Created from: Kowloon Central
- Replaced by: Kowloon East

Kowloon North-east was a geographical constituencies in the election for the Legislative Council of Hong Kong in 1995, which elects one member of the Legislative Council using the first-past-the-post voting system. The constituency covers Wong Tai Sin District in Kowloon.

The constituency was replaced by the Kowloon East constituency in 1998 after the handover of Hong Kong a year before.

== Returned members ==
Elected members are as follows:

Election	Member	Party
1995	Chan Yuen-han	DAB

== Election results ==
1995 Legislative Council election: Kowloon North-east
Party	Candidate	Votes	%	±%
DAB (FTU)	Chan Yuen-han	25,922	52.77	
Democratic	Mak Hoi-wah	23,201	47.23	
Majority		2,721	5.54	
Total valid votes		49,123	100.00	
Rejected ballots		442		
Turnout		49,565	36.94	
Registered electors		134,159		
DAB win (new seat)				
