= Kwong Tak (constituency) =

Hong Kong constituency

- Elected constituency for the Kwun Tong District Council
- Boundary of Kwong Tak in Kwun Tong District
- District: Kwun Tong
- Legislative Council constituency: Kowloon East
- Population: 18,079 (2019)
- Electorate: 12,843 (2019)

Current constituency
- Created: 1994
- Number of members: One
- Member: Wilson Or (DAB)

Kwong Tak (Chinese: 廣德) is one of the 37 constituencies in the Kwun Tong District of Hong Kong which was created in 1994 and currently held by Legislative Councillor Wilson Or of the Democratic Alliance for the Betterment and Progress of Hong Kong.

The constituency loosely covers part of Tak Tin Estate, Hong Ying Court and Kwong Tin Estate with the estimated population of 18,079.

== Councillors represented ==
Election	Member	Party
1994	Lee Ting-kit	123DA
1999	Wilson Or Chong-shing	DAB

== Election results ==
=== 2010s ===
Kwun Tong District Council Election, 2019: Kwong Tak
Party	Candidate	Votes	%	±%
DAB	Wilson Or Chong-shing	4,514	51.06	
People Power	Tam Tak-chi	4,327	48.94	
Majority		187	2.12	
Turnout		8,905	69.36	
DAB hold		Swing		

Kwun Tong District Council Election, 2015: Kwong Tak
Party	Candidate	Votes	%	±%
DAB	Wilson Or Chong-shing	Uncontested		
DAB hold		Swing		

Kwun Tong District Council Election, 2011: Kwong Tak
Party	Candidate	Votes	%	±%
DAB	Wilson Or Chong-shing	Uncontested		
DAB hold		Swing		

=== 2000s ===
Kwun Tong District Council Election, 2007: Kwong Tak
Party	Candidate	Votes	%	±%
DAB	Wilson Or Chong-shing	Uncontested		
DAB hold		Swing		

Kwun Tong District Council Election, 2003: Kwong Tak
Party	Candidate	Votes	%	±%
DAB	Wilson Or Chong-shing	3,393	79.0	–1.8
Independent	Ko Kam-fung	900	21.0	
Majority		2,493	58.0	−3.6
DAB hold		Swing		

=== 1990s ===
Kwun Tong District Council Election, 1999: Kwong Tak
Party	Candidate	Votes	%	±%
DAB	Wilson Or Chong-shing	2,597	80.8	
Democratic	Chan Chi-keung	616	19.2	
Majority		1,981	61.6	
DAB gain from 123DA		Swing		

Kwun Tong District Board Election, 1994: Kwong Tak
Party	Candidate	Votes	%	±%
123DA	Lee Ting-kit	1,165	58.7	
LDF	Chan Wing-hung	818	41.3	
Majority		347	17.4	
123DA win (new seat)				
