= Tsui Ping (constituency) =

Hong Kong constituency

- Elected constituency for the Kwun Tong District Council
- Boundary of Tsui Ping in Kwun Tong District
- District: Kwun Tong
- Legislative Council constituency: Kowloon East
- Population: 18,780 (2019)
- Electorate: 12,390 (2019)

Current constituency
- Created: 1982 (first time); 2011 (second time)
- Number of members: One
- Member: Vacant
- Created from: Tsui Ping South; Tsui Ping North

Tsui Ping is one of the 37 constituencies in the Kwun Tong District in Hong Kong. The constituency returns one district councillor to the Kwun Tong District Council, with an election every four years.

Tsui Ping constituency is loosely based on part of the Tsui Ping Estate in Kwun Tong with an estimated population of 18,780.

== Councillors represented ==
Election	Member	Party
1982	Ng Yat-chiu	Independent
1985	Fred Li Wah-ming	Meeting Point
1988	Fred Li Wah-ming	Meeting Point
1991	Fred Li Wah-ming	Meeting Point→Democratic
1994	Lam Ka-keung	Independent
1999	Constituency abolished	
2011	Fung Mei-wan	Independent
2015	Cheng Keung-fung	FPHE
2019	Hung Chun-hin→Vacant (Note: Disqualified on 3 May 2021.)	Democratic

== Election results ==
=== 2010s ===
Kwun Tong District Council Election, 2019: Tsui Ping
Party	Candidate	Votes	%	±%
Democratic	Hung Chun-hin	4,203	52.37	
FPHE	Cheng Keung-fung	3,822	47.63	
Majority		381	4.54	
Turnout				
Democratic gain from FPHE		Swing		

Kwun Tong District Council Election, 2015: Tsui Ping
Party	Candidate	Votes	%	±%
FPHE	Cheng Keung-fung	3,457	75.3	
People Power (Frontier)	Carol Lam Ho-chun	1,134	24.7	
Majority		2,323	40.6	
Turnout		4,665	39.3	
FPHE gain from Independent		Swing		

Kwun Tong District Council Election, 2011: Tsui Ping
Party	Candidate	Votes	%	±%
Independent	Fung Mei-wan	3,067	52.2	
Independent	Lam Ka-keung	2,805	47.8	
Independent win (new seat)				

=== 1990s ===
Kwun Tong District Board Election, 1994: Tsui Ping
Party	Candidate	Votes	%	±%
Independent	Lam Ka-keung	1,742	64.4	
Independent	Hui Chin-pang	935	34.6	
Independent gain from Democratic		Swing		

Kwun Tong District Board Election, 1991: Tsui Ping
Party	Candidate	Votes	%	±%
Meeting Point	Fred Li Wah-ming	Unopposed		
Meeting Point hold		Swing		

=== 1980s ===
Kwun Tong District Board Election, 1988: Tsui Ping
Party	Candidate	Votes	%	±%
Meeting Point	Fred Li Wah-ming	1,500	53.9	+3.2
Independent	Chu Man-kit	1,267	45.5	
Meeting Point hold		Swing		

Kwun Tong District Board Election, 1985: Tsui Ping
Party	Candidate	Votes	%	±%
Meeting Point	Fred Li Wah-ming	2,010	50.7	
Independent	Lau Sai-nang	1,252	31.6	
Independent	Chu Man-kit	677	17.1	
Meeting Point gain from Independent		Swing		

Kwun Tong District Board Election, 1982: Tsui Ping
Party	Candidate	Votes	%	±%
Independent	Ng Yat-chiu	1,646	48.9	
Independent	Lau Sai-nang	1,007	29.9	
Civic	Chu Cheung-yuk	312	9.3	
Civic	Au Yeung Sum-tin	288	8.6	
Independent	Chan Wang-cheung	71	2.1	
Independent win (new seat)				
