= Mak Hoi-wah =

Hong Kong politician (born 1951)

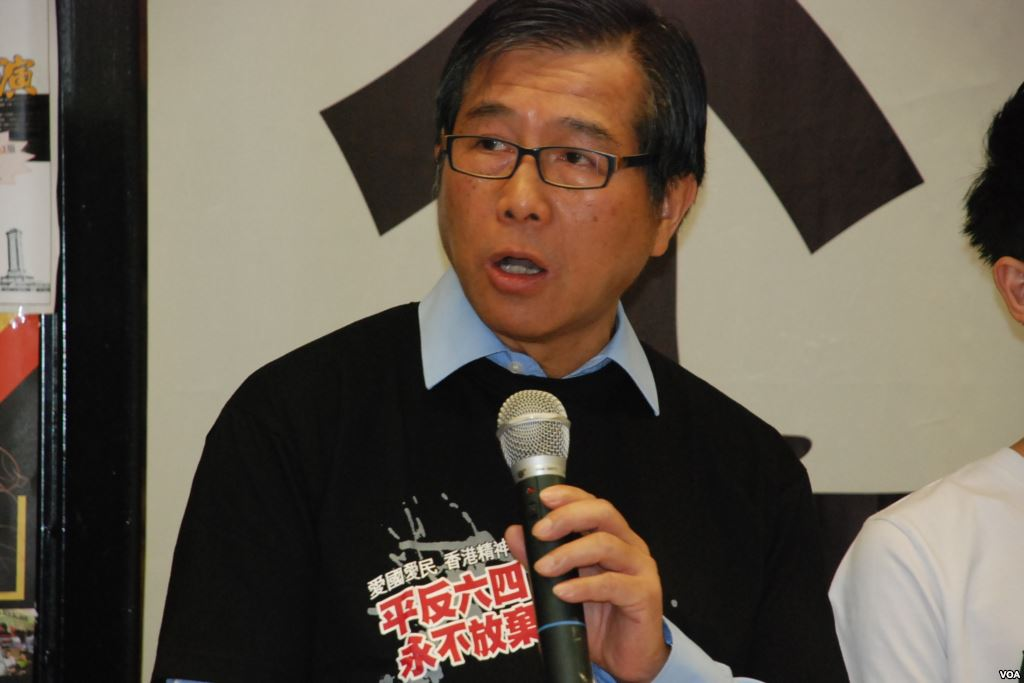
Mak Hoi Wah in 2013

Mak Hoi-wah (Chinese: 麥海華; born 9 April 1951) is a Hong Kong politician, social worker and social activist. He was the member of the Wong Tai Sin District Board and former vice-chairman of the Hong Kong Alliance in Support of Patriotic Democratic Movements in China. He is also a member of the Democratic Party.

== Biography ==
Mak was born in China in 1951. He was educated at the University of Hong Kong. During his student life, he and other liberal-minded students formed a cabinet to run against the "nationalist" faction which was dominated the Hong Kong University Students' Union along with Albert Ho in 1974. He graduated in 1976 with a Bachelor of Arts, majoring in Philosophy and Political Science. He furthered his study in Social Work at the university and graduated with a master's degree in 1978. In 1994 Mak received a Postgraduate Certificate in Laws from the City University of Hong Kong. In 1988, he became a lecturer at the Department of Applied Social Studies of the City University of Hong Kong. He had also been Council member of the City University of Hong Kong.

Mak was also involved in social activism in grassroots level during and after his student life. In 1975 he joined the Society for Community Organization (SoCO) and subsequently became its chairman from 1988 to 1992. From 1978 to 1982 he acted as the Centre Supervisor for the Neighbourhood Advice-Action Council and became its coordinator in 1982. He was responsible for the Community Development Project, serving the Diamond Hill squatters. In 1980, he helped founding the Hong Kong Social Workers' General Union and served as its president from 1980 to 1988. In 1993 he received a Badge of Honour for his contributions.

Mak first became an appointed member of the Wong Tai Sin District Board in 1982. In 1986, he served on the Hong Kong Basic Law Consultative Committee where he called for a democratic political system. In 1989, he was involved in the Tiananmen protests and became a founding member of the Hong Kong Alliance in Support of Patriotic Democratic Movements in China and had served as its vice-chairman. In 1990, he and other pro-democrats founded the United Democrats of Hong Kong and became its central committee member and after it was transformed into the Democratic Party.

He ran several times in the Legislative Council elections, first time in 1985 through the Social Services functional constituency but was defeated by Hui Yin-fat; second time in 1995 in Kowloon Northeast constituency against Chan Yuen-han of the pro-Beijing Democratic Alliance for the Betterment of Hong Kong (DAB) but was again defeated. He ran again in 1998 as a third candidate on the Democratic Party's Kowloon East ticket and was not elected. From 2007, he has been member of the Election Committee through Social Welfare sub-sector.
