= Wilson Or =

Hong Kong politician

The Honourable Wilson Or Chong-shing MH
- 柯創盛
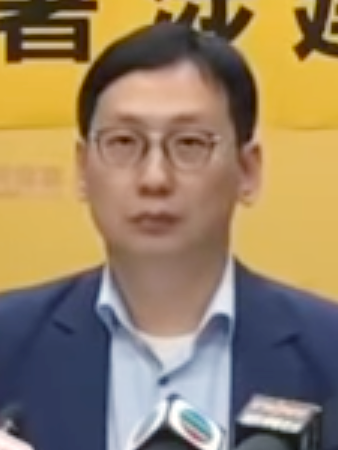

Member of the Legislative Council
- In office 1 October 2016 – 31 December 2021
- Preceded by: Chan Kam-lam
- Succeeded by: Constituency abolished
- Constituency: Kowloon East

Personal details
- Born: 9 July 1973 (age 53) Hong Kong
- Party: Democratic Alliance for the Betterment and Progress of Hong Kong
- Education: Nottingham Trent University (MBA^{disputed})

Wilson Or Chong-shing, MH (Chinese: 柯創盛; born 9 July 1973) is a Hong Kong politician. He is an executive committee member of the Democratic Alliance for the Betterment and Progress of Hong Kong (DAB), the largest pro-Beijing party. He is a member of Kwun Tong District Council, having represented Kwong Tak since 2000.

Or won a seat on Kwun Tong District Council in 1999, as a member of the Democratic Alliance for the Betterment of Hong Kong (DAB), beating a candidate from the Democratic Party. He retained his seat in 2003 despite the party's negative image following its support for Basic Law Article 23 legislation, receiving the highest votes in the district. He went on to be re-elected in 2007, 2011 and 2015 unopposed.

In 2011, he was elected to the Election Committee, through the Hong Kong and Kowloon District Councils Subsector, which was responsible for selecting the Chief Executive in 2012. In 2013, he joined the DAB's executive committee.

In the 2016 Legislative Council election, he won the seat formerly held by DAB veteran Chan Kam-lam in Kowloon East. He held his seat in the 2019 District Council elections.

On 14 January 2021, Or was in a video call with the Legislative Council's Panel on Housing, where he was suspected to have been in a car while in the meeting. Or later said he was in the office, but changed his story afterwards and said he was in the car.

Political offices
Preceded by Lee Ting-kit	Member of Kwun Tong District Council; Representative for Kwong Tak; 2000–2023	Succeeded by Constituency abolished
Preceded by Constituency created	Member of Kwun Tong District Council; Representative for Kwun Tong Central; 2024–present	Incumbent
Legislative Council of Hong Kong
Preceded by Chan Kam-lam	Member of Legislative Council; Representative for Kowloon East; 2016–2021	Constituency abolished
Order of precedence
Preceded by Shiu Ka-chun; Member of the Legislative Council	Hong Kong order of precedence Member of the Legislative Council	Succeeded by Yung Hoi-yan; Member of the Legislative Council
