= Szeto Wah =

Hong Kong activist and politician

- 司徒華
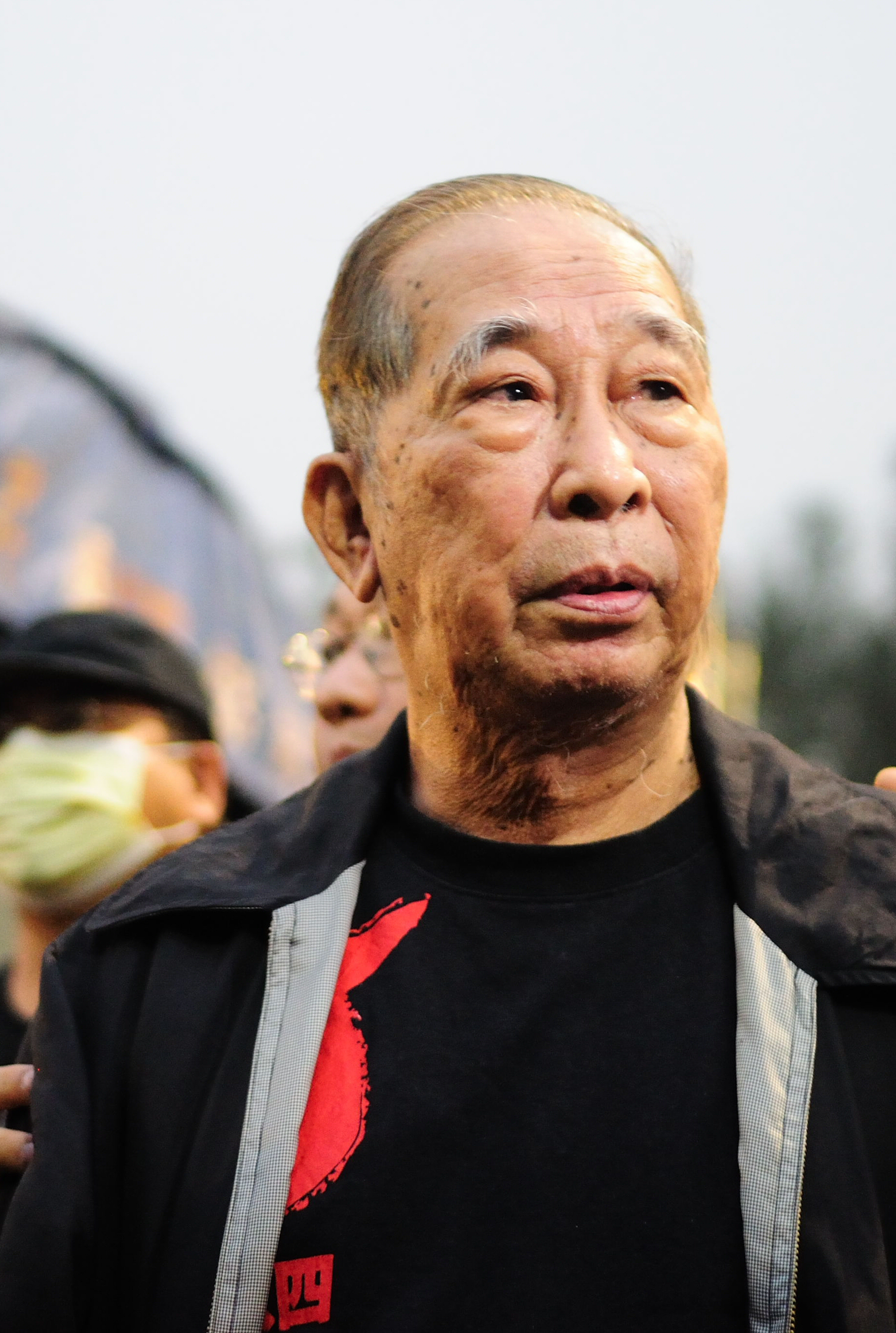
- Szeto Wah at the 21st anniversary candlelight vigil in Causeway Bay, Hong Kong

Chairman of the Hong Kong Professional Teachers' Union
- In office 1974–1990
- Preceded by: New title
- Succeeded by: Cheung Man-kwong

Chairman of the Hong Kong Alliance in Support of Patriotic Democratic Movements of China
- In office 21 May 1989 – 2 January 2011
- Preceded by: New title
- Succeeded by: Lee Cheuk Yan

Member of the Legislative Council
- In office 30 October 1985 – 22 August 1991
- Preceded by: New title
- Succeeded by: Cheung Man-kwong
- Constituency: Teaching
- Majority: 68.64% (1985); Unopposed (1988)
- In office 9 October 1991 – 30 June 1997
- Preceded by: New seat
- Succeeded by: Replaced by Provisional Legislative Council
- Constituency: Kowloon East
- Majority: 37.83% (1991); 55.40% (1995)
- In office 1 July 1998 – 30 September 2004
- Preceded by: New Parliament
- Succeeded by: Albert Cheng
- Constituency: Kowloon East
- Majority: 33.33% (1998); 25.00% (2000)

Personal details
- Born: Szeto Wai Wah (司徒衛華); 28 February 1931 Hong Kong
- Died: 2 January 2011 (aged 79) Prince of Wales Hospital, Shatin, Hong Kong
- Party: United Democrats (1990–94) Democratic Party (1994–2011)
- Other political affiliations: Hong Kong Alliance in Support of Patriotic Democratic Movements of China
- Education: Queen's College, Hong Kong; Grantham College of Education
- Profession: Teacher and Politician
- Website: http://www.szetowah.org.hk

Szeto Wah
- Traditional Chinese: 司徒華
- Simplified Chinese: 司徒华
Transcriptions
Standard Mandarin
- Hanyu Pinyin: Sītú Huá
Yue: Cantonese
- Yale Romanization: Sī tòuh Wàh
- Jyutping: Si^{1} tou^{4} Waa^{4}

Szeto Wah (Chinese: 司徒華; 28 February 1931 – 2 January 2011) was a Hong Kong democracy activist and politician. He was the founding chairman of the Hong Kong Alliance in Support of Patriotic Democratic Movements of China, the Hong Kong Professional Teachers' Union and former member of the Legislative Council of Hong Kong from 1985 to 1997 and from 1997 to 2004.

Being one of the two icons of the Hong Kong democracy movement alongside Martin Lee, Szeto played an instrumental role in the emergence of the pro-democracy camp. Entering politics as a trade unionist for teachers, Szeto founded the influential Hong Kong Professional Teachers' Union and was first elected to the colonial legislature through the newly created Teaching functional constituency in 1985. He and Martin Lee became the two pro-democrats appointed to the Hong Kong Basic Law Drafting Committee by the Beijing government in 1985 until the duo resigned in the wake of the 1989 Tiananmen Square protests and massacre.

Szeto played a significant part in gathering popular support of the Hong Kong public in the Tiananmen democracy movement and subsequently the Operation Yellowbird rescuing the wanted democracy activists. He also founded the Hong Kong Alliance which has been responsible for the annual memorials for the protests. On the basis of the pro-democracy support he also co-founded the United Democrats of Hong Kong to contest in the first Legislative Council direct elections which later transformed into the Democratic Party.

Szeto remained as the unofficial party whip of the Democratic Party. He retired from the Legislative Council in 2004 and retained his influence in the pan-democracy camp. In 2010, he led the moderate faction of the camp to oppose the radical-led Five Constituencies Referendum movement and played a significant role in drawing the revised proposal of the electoral reform package in the Democrats' negotiation with the Beijing authorities. He remained the chairman of the Hong Kong Alliance until he died in 2011 at the age of 79.

== Early life and underground activism ==
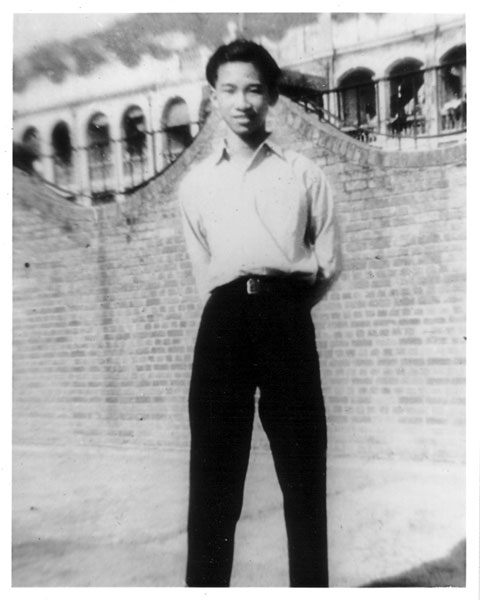
Szeto Wah in front of Yau Ma Tei Government School in 1947

Szeto Wah was born in Hong Kong on 28 February 1931 in Hong Kong with the family root in Chikan, Kaiping, Guangdong. His father, Szeto Ting, moved to Hong Kong for work during his young age. In 1941 during the Japanese occupation of Hong Kong, his family moved back to Kaiping. He recalled his patriotism grew during the war when he heard about the stories of the Chinese war heroes. His mother died at the age of 38 in 1942 and his father remarried afterwards. In 1945, when the war had almost ended, his family moved back to Hong Kong. His father died of cancer at the Precious Blood Hospital in 1952 and was survived by his second wife and ten children.

In Hong Kong, Szeto Wah studied at the Yau Ma Tei Government School and then Queen's College, and graduated from the Grantham College of Education. Under his brother Szeto Ming's influence, he and his siblings joined the YWCA which had a strong left-wing leaning at the time during his student life. He was contacted by the underground Communists and joined the Chinese New Democracy Youth League, the predecessor of the Communist Youth League of China, in September 1949. Under the instruction of the Chinese Communist Party (CCP), Szeto founded the Hok Yau Club in 1949. Without any official affiliation, Hok Yau Club was responsible for recruiting youths for the Communist cause. Among the recruits at the time was Mo Kwan-nin, who rose to the deputy director of the New China News Agency in 1980s. The club ceased to function between 1952 and 1953 after it was busted by the Hong Kong Police Special Branch. At the same time, he entered the teaching profession in 1952.

After the club resumed activities in 1953, Szeto Wah was ousted in the leadership elections in 1957 and 1958 by the "red faction", the students who studied at the pro-Communist schools compared to the "gray faction" who studied at the English schools like Szeto himself. After having been stripped of his leadership, Szeto was frustrated with the power struggles and the distrust by the party leadership. Szeto was sent to become an editor at the left-leaning Children's Weekly in 1960. At the same time, he became headmaster of the GCEPSA Kwun Tong Primary School in 1961. After the journal was closed down in 1966, the party ceased to contact Szeto.

== Teacher unionism and activism ==
In 1971, the Hong Kong government suggested unpegging the salaries of the certificated masters to the nurses to cut their salaries by 15 per cent which sparked an uproar among the teachers. Szeto Wah was actively involved in the opposition campaign and the founding of the Hong Kong Professional Teachers' Union (HKPTU) in 1972 as the founding vice-chairman under Tsin Sai-nin. In April 1973, Szeto Wah took a leading role in two waves of labour strikes. After the strikes, the teachers negotiated with government representative Jack Cater with Bishop Francis Hsu as the mediator. As a result, the teachers cancelled the third labour strike and began the negotiation process with the government. The government eventually backed down on the plan, but installed a "3-2-2" standard which raised the salaries of the certificated masters after their salary points had reached the highest levels in three, two and two years.

The PTU was found in 1972 as an instrument for Tsin Sai-nin to gather teachers' votes in the 1973 Urban Council election, as Tsin was opposed by the Hong Kong Teachers' Association. After Tsin was elected, he quit the PTU preparatory committee and the chairmanship was succeeded by Szeto. Szeto became the first chairman elected in 1974 and assumed its position until 1990. He was seen by journalist Louise do Rosario as "a dictatorial leader...in most meetings he monopolises the talking, with detail of his plan, strategies well-sorted out before his colleagues start to comprehend the basic outline."

In 1977, the Precious Blood Golden Jubilee Secondary School was exposed with a corruption scandal. The teachers and students launched a strike for two days. In response, the Director of Education issued warning letters to the teachers. The PTU received complaints from the teachers and demanded the withdrawal of the warning letters. Afterwards, the school changed its leadership and issued new restrictions into teachers' contracts and warning letters to teachers against Szeto Wah's advice. In May 1977, the Education Department closed down the school with the approval of the Executive Council. The PTU organised assemblies and petitions to demand the reopening of the school and investigation of the event. As a result, Governor Murray MacLehose appointed a three-member committee into the event consisting of Rayson Huang, Lo King-man and Maisie Wong. The committee suggested the founding of the Ng Yuk Secondary School to receive the teachers and students, withdrawing the warning letters and negating the actions of the school.

The PTU continued to grow into a significant labour union and pressure group in the territory. According to do Rosario, Szeto even became one of "the most influential persons in Hongkong's political scene mid-70s". Due to its scale and influence, the PTU was put under surveillance by the Standing Committee on Pressure Groups (SCOPG) of the Hong Kong government in 1979. In the report, the PTU was noted by its influence and organisation. Szeto was highlighted for his leadership and effectiveness in maintaining the PTU's independence against Communist infiltration.

In 1978, Szeto Wah was elected chairman of the joint committee of the Chinese Language Movement during the second wave of the movement for the equal status of the Chinese language to English. The joint committee laid out three goals: the full implementation of the Chinese language as the official language, teaching with Chinese in school, and improvement of the Chinese teaching along with English. The movement died down as the Sino-British negotiation over the Hong Kong sovereignty took the spotlight in the early 1980s.

Szeto was also involved in the Defend Diaoyu Islands movement in 1982 sparked by the Japanese government's revision of the history textbooks. He organised the assembly on 18 September, the anniversary of the Mukden Incident, in Victoria Park which was well attended.

== Early pro-democracy activism ==
In the 1980s during the Sino-British negotiation over the Hong Kong sovereignty, Szeto Wah called for the Chinese resumption of the Hong Kong sovereignty and a democratic China and Hong Kong. In 1984 the Hong Kong government published the Green Paper: the Further Development of Representative Government in Hong Kong to suggest the introduction of direct elections in Hong Kong. Initiated by the Szeto-led PTU, 89 organisations attended an assembly at the Ko Shan Theatre on 18 September 1984 in response to the Green Paper. In December 1984, Szeto was invited by the Beijing government to witness the signing of the Sino-British Joint Declaration.

In 1985, the Beijing government invited Szeto to sit on the Hong Kong Basic Law Drafting Committee to draft the Basic Law of Hong Kong, the mini-constitution of the Special Administrative Region after 1997. He met another like-minded barrister Martin Lee in the Drafting Committee with whom he began to push for further democratisation in the following years. In the first indirect elections to the Legislative Council, Szeto was elected through the Teaching functional constituency with Martin Lee who got elected through the Legal sector.

Szeto Wah began actively pushing a faster pace of democratisation. On 27 October 1986, 91 organisations gathered to form the Joint Committee on the Promotion of Democratic Government to push forward the proposal of the "Group of 190" which demanded half of the seats in the 1988 Legislative Council to be elected directly. The committee also sent a delegation including Szeto to Beijing to meet with deputy director of the Hong Kong and Macau Affairs Office Li Hou. However, despite the general support the committee received on the 1988 direct elections, the Hong Kong government's Survey Office concluded that 70 per cent of the people opposed it. The government's decision to introduce direct elections only in 1991 was protested by the pro-democrats who burnt a paper-made lame duck to mock the Hong Kong government's back down in front of Beijing's pressure.

The joint committee also demanded direct elections of the post-1997 Chief Executive and the Legislative Council to be included in the Basic Law. The Group of 190 proposal was countered by the highly conservative Cha proposal by Louis Cha and Cha Chi-ming backed by Beijing. The joint committee launched a series of campaign against the Cha proposal. As a result, Szeto Wah and Martin Lee became the only two drafters to vote against the proposal in the Drafting Committee.

== 1989 Tiananmen Square massacre and memorials ==
The 1989 Tiananmen Square protests and massacre became the breaking point of the relationship of Szeto Wah and the CCP. The Joint Committee on the Promotion of Democratic Government was active in voicing support in the student protests in Beijing starting from May. On 20 May, it organised a rally against the government's martial law which attracted a large amount of turnout despite under the typhoon no. 8. On the next day, another million attended the rally marching from Chater Road in Central to Happy Valley Racecourse. The joint committee announced its reorganisation into the Hong Kong Alliance in Support of Patriotic Democratic Movements of China. Szeto was elected chairman of the alliance, a role in which he remained until his death in 2011.

On 27 May, the alliance helped organise the Concert For Democracy in China at the Happy Valley Racecourse. On the next day, the alliance organised another rally where a million people turned out. After the bloody crackdown on the protesters on 4 June, the alliance organised a rally condemning the Beijing authorities. On 5 June when Hong Kong activist Lee Cheuk-yan was arrested in Beijing, Szeto and Albert Ho met with Governor David Wilson at the Government House and insisted that they would not leave if the Governor did not call Prime Minister Margaret Thatcher for help. After an hour of stalemate, Wilson sent a telegraph to London seeking for assistance.

Szeto also planned a general strike on 7 June. However, a minor riot in Mong Kok in the early morning of 7 June occurred. He received a call from Lydia Dunn, the Senior Member of the Executive Council, saying that she had received a report from the police that some men from the mainland were involved in the riot. He was suggested to cancel the planned rally in which he agreed.

Szeto also resigned from his position in the Drafting Committee with Martin Lee after the crackdown. They were strongly criticised by the Beijing authorities, being called "subversive" and denied entry to the Mainland. He also refused to enter the mainland since. Under his chairmanship, the alliance laid out several goals, including rehabilitation of the 1989 pro-democracy movement. He had also been responsible for the annual Tiananmen memorials and the candlelight vigil at the Victoria Park since 1990. The year 2009 saw a resurgence of the attendees of the candlelight vigil. Governor David Wilson and Chief Executive Tung Chee-hwa asked Szeto three times to disband the alliance but was refused by Szeto.

The alliance was also involved in the Operation Yellowbird, providing shelter for the escaped activists in Hong Kong, confirming the identity of the activists with the Hong Kong Police Special Branch, liaising with the foreign consuls for the refuge applications and so forth, which successfully smuggled three or four hundred people abroad including student leaders Chai Ling and Wu'erkaixi.

== Party and electoral politics ==
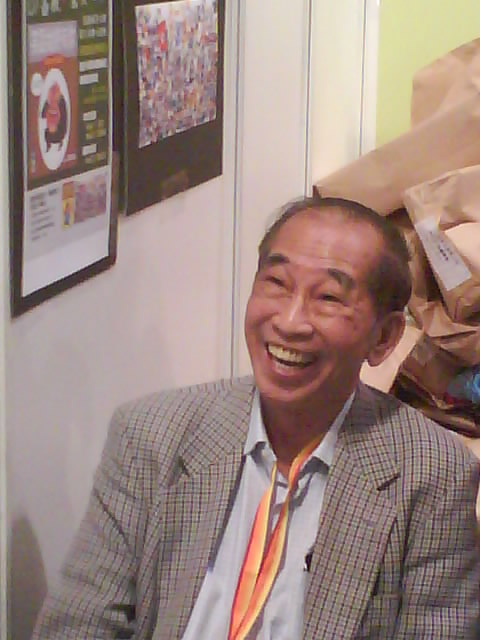
Szeto Wah in 2007.

On 6 April 1990, Szeto Wah and other democracy activists formed the United Democrats of Hong Kong, the first pro-democracy political party in the wake of the Tiananmen democracy movement and the coming first direct election in 1991. Szeto Wah ran in Kowloon East, receiving more than 57,000 votes and elected with his ally Meeting Point's Li Wah-ming. The United Democrats emerged as the largest party in the legislature by winning 14 of the 18 directly elected seats.

After the election, the British government replaced David Wilson with Chris Patten as the last Governor of Hong Kong. In his inaugural policy address, Patten proposed a bold electoral reform proposal which broadened the franchise of the nine newly created functional constituencies. Patten's proposal received strong opposition from the Beijing authorities. In response to the Beijing's strong stance, the United Democrats saw the need to unite with the moderate democrats, and therefore merged with the Meeting Point to form the Democratic Party in 1994. In the mutual understanding between Szeto Wah and Martin Lee, Lee was the chairman of the party while Szeto was in charge of the alliance. Nonetheless, Szeto was given as the unofficial position of "party whip" due to his seniority without much actual power.

Szeto Wah ran in the 1995 Legislative Council election as implemented by the Patten's proposal. He defeated another veteran politician Elsie Tu in Kowloon East, who he had defeated few months ago in the Urban Council election. The Democratic Party won 12 of the 20 directly elected seats. With other individuals, the pro-democrats won 31 of the 60 seats. In response to the Patten's proposal, Beijing decided to dismantle the promised "through train" which allowed the 1995 elected legislature to survive through 1997. The Democrats boycotted the Provisional Legislative Council as they deemed as extra-constitutional.

Szeto Wah also launched a petition movement as the civil Chief Executive to mock the first Chief Executive election of 1996 by the Beijing-controlled 400-member Selection Committee. Szeto eventually accumulated more than 104,000 signatures with their ID numbers. The election was ultimately won by shipping magnate Tung Chee-hwa who was hand-picked by Beijing.

For his staunch pro-democracy conviction, Time once described him as "democracy's foot soldier", and named him one of the 25 most influential people in Hong Kong. In 1997, he was awarded the Homo Homini Award for human rights activism by the Czech group People in Need.

Szeto Wah and other Democrats ran in the first SAR Legislative Council election in May 1998 in which Szeto and Li Wah-ming won about 145,000 votes, taking two of the three seats in Kowloon East. Although the pro-democrats won 20 seats, their influence was balanced by the pro-Beijing members elected through the 10-seat Election Committee constituency. Szeto was re-elected in 2000 and decided to retire in 2004.

In 2005, the "Real Brothers incident" broke out in the Democratic Party as there were allegations of the reformist faction being infiltrated by Beijing. Szeto Wah became one of the five-member committee to investigate the incident. As a result, the accused reformist faction was defeated in the 2006 intra-party election.

On 25 May 2007 Szeto Wah was one of eight people arrested and charged with speaking at a radio show broadcast hosted by the unlicensed Citizen's Radio on the subject of the 1989 Tiananmen Square protests and massacre. Critics argued that the Hong Kong government selectively persecuted Szeto for using unlicensed equipment when delivering the political message as other members had spoken on the radio and were not charged.

== Last days ==
In December 2009, Szeto Wah was diagnosed with terminal lung cancer. He was told by pro-Beijing politician Cheng Kai-nam that the central government was concerned about his illness. Some mainland doctors were sent to see Szeto. Chief Executive Donald Tsang also visited Szeto and told him that he could arrange Szeto to be treated in the mainland. However, Szeto said that "many people in China are being tortured and prosecuted, and if I go back it would be a privilege, a totally different treatment. I feel guilty and cannot accept the offer."

In 2009, the radical democratic League of Social Democrats (LSD) proposed the resignation of the pro-democracy legislator in each geographical constituency to trigger a territory-wide de facto referendum called the "Five Constituencies Referendum" over the 2012 constitutional reform package. Szeto initially said it was considerable and suggested the Democratic Party to actively respond to it. However, after a period of observation, Szeto believed the true intention of the LSD was to take over the leadership of the democracy movement as they had aggressively attacked other allies within the camp. Szeto then shifted his stance on the movement and actively opposed the proposed plan. In December 2009, the Democratic Party voted down the proposal to join the movement. As the pro-Beijing parties boycotted the by-elections, the turnout rate was only 17 per cent.

Meanwhile, the Democratic Party leaders began to negotiate with the Beijing authorities and a revised proposal suggested by Szeto Wah was accepted by Beijing. Szeto Wah attended the party meeting after chemotherapy and spoke in support of the revised proposal, stating that it was better to have the increase of five directly elected seats, five functional constituency seats but almost directly elected and the abolition of the appointed District Council seats than nothing.

After the Democratic Party voted for the revised package, the Democratic Party and Szeto Wah received harsh criticisms from its former allies and supporters, condemning them for betraying democracy and the Hong Kong people. "Longhair" Leung Kwok-hung in a protest in front of the PTU headquarters said Szeto Wah had his cancer got into his brain. In the following 1 July march, Szeto on his wheelchair also received criticisms from his supporters, saying that the "Democratic Party sold out Hong Kong people." In response, Szeto argued, "Sold out? How much for selling out? ... Are you pig or dog? Can you be sold out?"

== Death and funeral ==
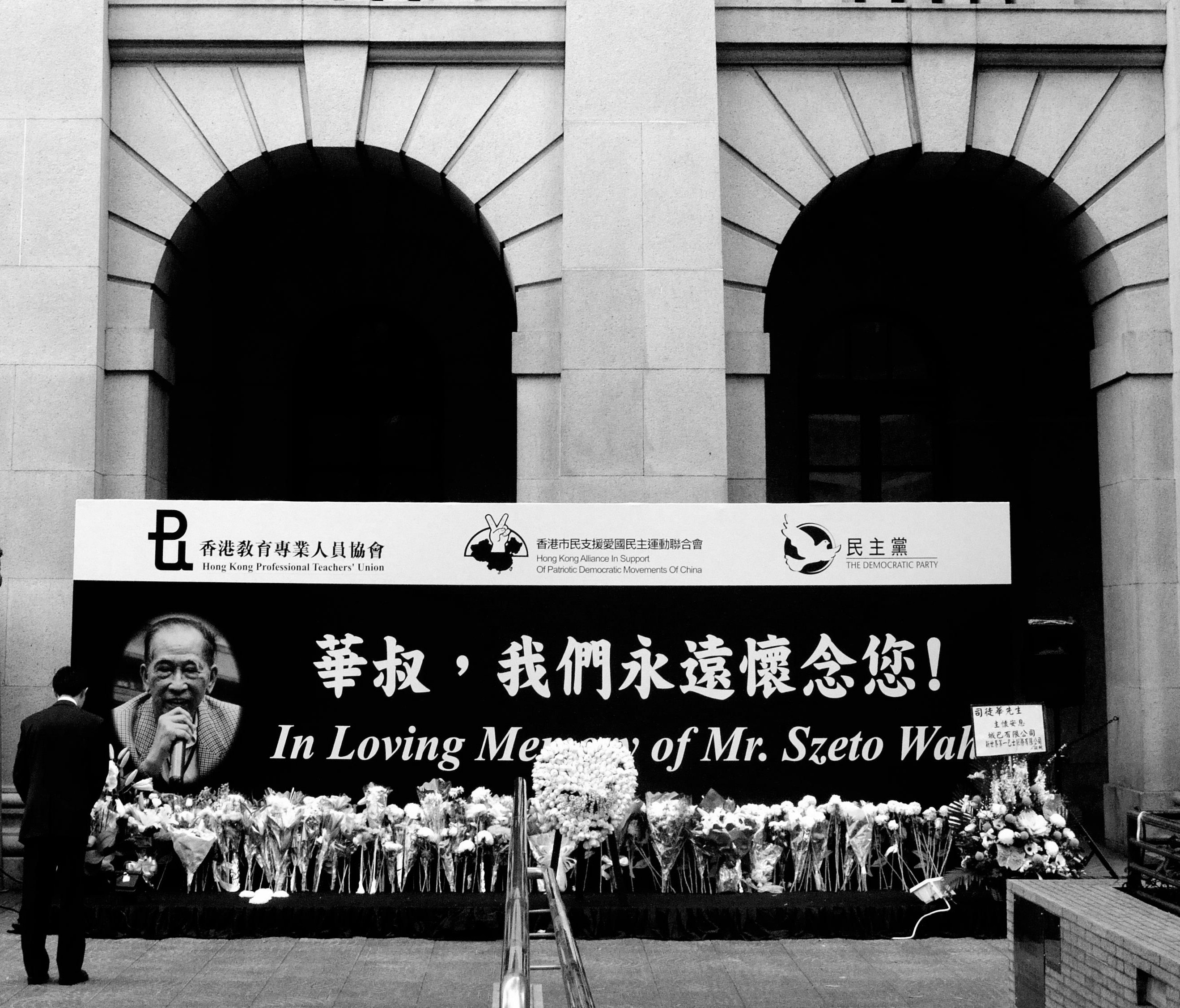
Szeto Wah's memorial service in front of the Legislative Council Building

Szeto Wah died on 2 January 2011 at the Prince of Wales Hospital. He was 79. His last words were "Success doesn't need to involve me; however, when success comes, I will be part of it." In a service at St Andrew's Church in Tsim Sha Tsui, bells tolled six long and four short times, representing the victims of the Tiananmen Square protests and massacre. In accordance with his wishes, Szeto's body was cremated; half the ashes to be scattered in Hong Kong waters, the other half scattered in a garden at Cape Collinson Crematorium. Chief Executive Donald Tsang described Szeto as "passionate about China and Hong Kong, Mr Szeto Wah was devoted in promoting democracy. Upright, industrious and unwavering in the pursuit of his ideals, Mr Szeto earned great respect from across the community."

Exiled mainland dissidents Wang Dan and Wu'erkaixi had expressed their strong desire to attend the funeral. Pan-democrats petitioned the Hong Kong government to allow them to enter Hong Kong to attend Szeto's funeral on compassionate grounds under the one country, two systems principle, although NPCSC delegate Rita Fan said the request represented a huge dilemma for the government as it would set a precedent. On 10 January, Wang Guangya, director of the Hong Kong and Macao Affairs Office, declared that decision on whether to allow dissidents to enter was in the hands of the Hong Kong government; he expressed confidence that they would "handle it well". On 26 January, the government announced that the application of Wang Dan to enter Hong Kong had been declined by after "careful consideration"; a spokesman said the decision was made based on the potential "consequences" of allowing him in. The decision was denounced by Wang, Wu'er Kaixi, and pro-democrat legislator Lee Cheuk-yan, saying that the government had surrendered the principle of "one country, two systems".

== Personal life ==
Szeto Wah never married. His only publicly acknowledged relationship was with fellow teacher Wong Siu-yung, who passed away in the 1980s. Under Wong's influence, Szeto was baptized as Christian on 8 April 1985. He lived with his younger sister in Mong Kok. His brother, Szeto Keung, joined the state-owned New China News Agency Hong Kong Branch in the 1950s and remained working there.

Aside from his political career, Szeto was also well known for his Chinese calligraphy skills. He was also a keen swimmer.

== See also ==
- List of Chinese pro-democracy activists
- Memorials for the Tiananmen Square protests of 1989

== Bibliography ==
- 司徒華 (2011). 大江東去：司徒華回憶錄. 牛津大學. ISBN 9780193975910.

Educational offices
New creation	Chairman of Hong Kong Professional Teachers' Union; 1974–1990	Succeeded by Cheung Man-kwong
Legislative Council of Hong Kong
New constituency	Member of Legislative Council; Representative for Teaching; 1985–1991	Succeeded by Cheung Man-kwong
New constituency	Member of Legislative Council; Representative for Kowloon East; 1991–1997; With: Fred Li (1991–1995)	Replaced by Provisional Legislative Council
New parliament	Member of Legislative Council; Representative for Kowloon East; 1998–2004	Succeeded by Albert Cheng
Political offices
New creation	Chairman of the Hong Kong Alliance in Support of Patriotic Democratic Movements of China; 1989–2011	Succeeded by Lee Cheuk-yan
Preceded by Elsie Tu	Member of Urban Council; Representative for Kwun Tong North; 1995–1999	Abolished
