= Jeremy Tam =

Hong Kong politician and airline pilot

Jeremy Tam Man-ho
- 譚文豪
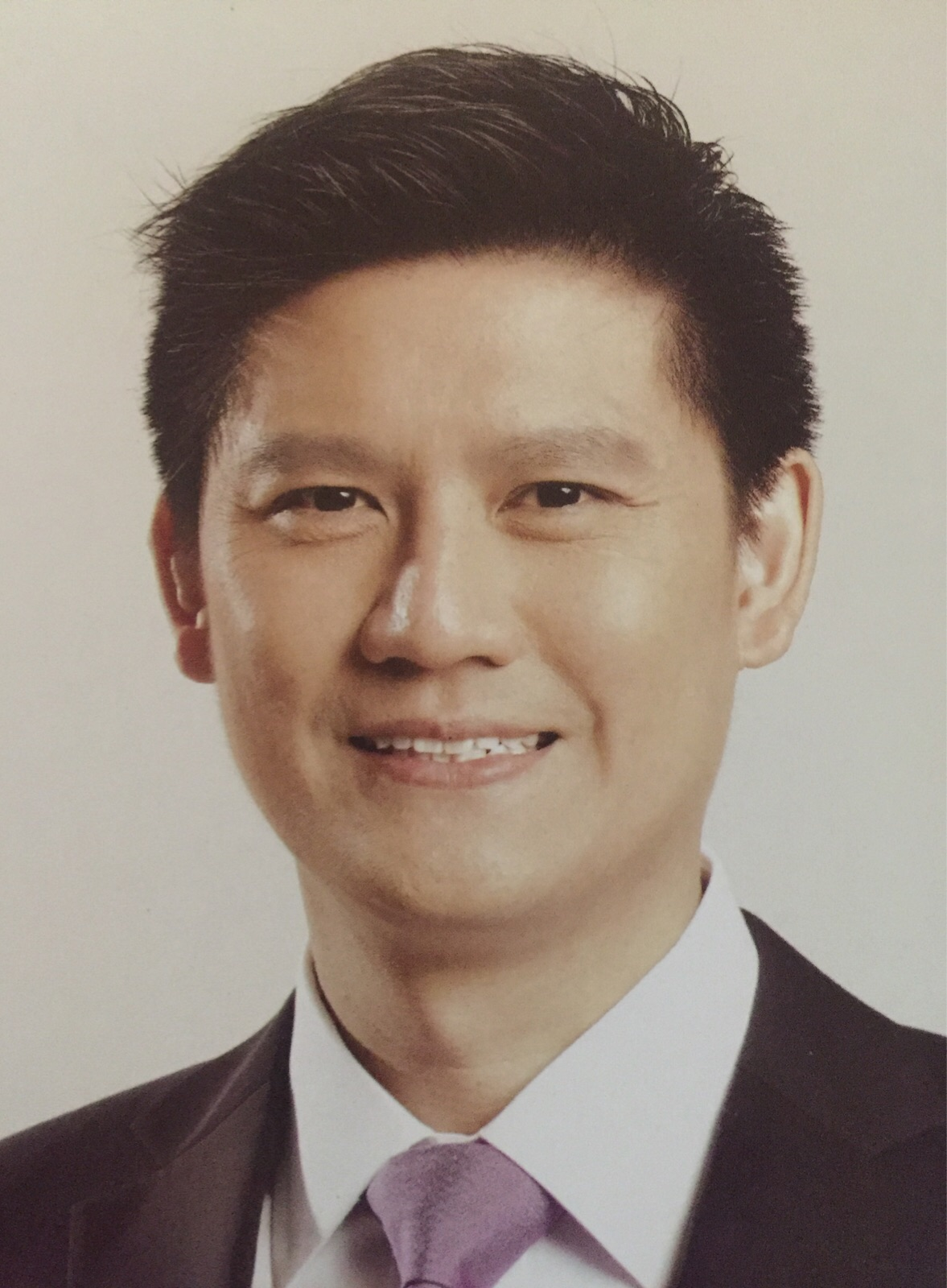

Member of the Legislative Council
- In office 1 October 2016 – 1 December 2020
- Preceded by: Alan Leong
- Succeeded by: Constituency abolished
- Constituency: Kowloon East

Personal details
- Born: 13 June 1975 (age 51) Hong Kong
- Party: Civic Party (quit in 2021)
- Education: Pentecostal Lam Hon Kwong School; University of Queensland; University of New South Wales
- Profession: Pilot

Jeremy Jansen Tam Man-ho (traditional Chinese: 譚文豪; simplified Chinese: 谭文豪; born 13 June 1975) is a Hong Kong politician, airline pilot, and former Vice-Chairman of the Hong Kong Civic Party's Kowloon East Branch. He was a former member of the Legislative Council representing Kowloon East, having been elected in the 2016 Hong Kong Legislative Council election. Tam resigned along with 14 other remaining pro-democracy legislators from the Legislative Council on 11 November 2020, after the central government had unseated four of pro-democracy legislators the same day.

== Background ==
Tam grew up in Hong Kong. According to Tam, his great-grandparents and grandfather had moved to Hong Kong to escape from political prosecution in Mainland China. He graduated with honours from the University of Queensland, where he earned a bachelor's degree in Mechanical and Space Engineering. He then attended the University of New South Wales in Australia, where he graduated with a master's degree in Transport Engineering. He became the first Chinese person to serve on the executive committee of the Hong Kong Aircrew Officers Association, the Cathay Pacific pilots' union and an organisation committed to fighting for the equal pay and fair treatment of Chinese and foreign pilots, aircraft parking regulations, energy conservation, and environmental protection initiatives in the airline industry.

In 2013, Tam created a Facebook page for sharing aviation knowledge and communicating with the media about issues in the airline industry. In 2014, Tam released his first book, an introduction to the airline industry and a guide to becoming a pilot. He donated the royalty income from the book to the Hong Kong Air Cadet Corps to establish a scholarship to allow young people to attend flight school. Over that year, Tam also co-produced a 13-episode series titled "Uncovering the Aviation Accident Mysteries," which aired on Radio Television Hong Kong.

== Personal life ==
Tam is married with two children, a son and a daughter.

== Airport baggage incident ==
In the early hours of 28 March 2016, Leung Chung-yan, the daughter of Hong Kong Chief Executive Leung Chun-ying, became embroiled in a controversy at Hong Kong International Airport. Leung Chung-yan had reportedly left her hand baggage in the departure hall after she had passed through the security checkpoint to board a flight for San Francisco. According to Apple Daily, witnesses alleged that his wife Regina Tong, who accompanied her daughter to the airport, engaged in a lengthy argument with airport staff to have staff reunite her daughter with her missing bag. Staff insisted on upholding procedure, which required that the passenger exit the secured zone to recover the missing item and pass through security again. Leung Chung-yan reportedly telephoned her father to seek help in resolving the impasse. The phone was given to airline staff, who brought Leung her bag, making clear that they had made an exception to procedure. Leung boarded her flight minutes later. Leung Chun-ying denied that he had abused his power by ordering airline staff to retrieve Chung-yan's bag in violation of security guidelines. Following the news of the incident, the Airport Authority Hong Kong issued a statement stating that it was not against existing procedure for someone other than the passenger to retrieve any missing baggage from airport security and bring it into the restricted area after a security check.

In response, Tam launched an online petition, calling the incident a serious violation of airport security guidelines and claiming that Leung Chun-Ying had abused his power as Chief Executive, thereby setting a dangerous precedent for future incidents. The petition accrued over 36,000 signatures. Tam then submitted the jointly signed petition to three international aviation organisations: the International Civil Aviation Organization (ICAO) and the Airports Council International (ACI), of which Hong Kong International Airport is a member, and the International Air Transport Association (IATA), with which a number of airlines have business. Tam also submitted the petition to two United States aviation agencies, the Transportation Security Administration (TSA) and the US Federal Aviation Administration (FAA), because Leung Chun-yan's flight landed in San Francisco.

Two months after the petition had been submitted, the ICAO had not given Tam a response. Tam travelled to ICAO's Asia-Pacific headquarters in Thailand to personally resubmit the petition to an ICAO officer to be delivered to the ICAO Secretary-General.

== Political career ==
Tam became involved in politics when he joined the historic 2003 1 July protests, which drew more than 500,000 people against the legislation of the Hong Kong Basic Law Article 23. He followed his role model, legislator Margaret Ng to join the Civic Party, which derived from the Article 45 Concern Group emerged from the 2003 protests.

In 2007, Tam ran as an independent candidate to represent Tung Chung North in that year's District Council elections. In subsequent elections, he ran as a Civic Party candidate, first in 2011 to represent Tung Chung North in its District Council, then in 2012 to represent Kowloon East in the Legislative Council. In 2015, Tam ran in the Laguna City District Council election, also being the only candidate failing to get a seat with over 3,000 votes. Tam stood in the 2012 Legislative Council election to represent Kowloon East on the second place of the Civic Party's list after party leader Alan Leong and helped secure Leong's re-election. In the 2016 Legislative Council Election, Leong stepped down to the second place on the list to stand behind Tam.

In 2014, Tam became the Vice-Chairman of the Civic Party's Kowloon East Branch. Tam has expressed concerns about transportation, environmental protection, land planning, and animal rights issues.

In the 2016 Hong Kong Legislative Council election, he was elected through Kowloon East.

On 11 November 2020, Tam resigned together with 14 remaining pro-democratic legislators in protest over the unseating of four pro-democratic legislators through a ruling by the central government on the same day.

On 6 January 2021, Tam was among 53 members of the pro-democratic camp who were arrested under the national security law, specifically its provision regarding alleged subversion. The group stood accused of the organisation of and participation in unofficial primary elections held by the camp in July 2020. Tam was released on bail on 7 January, a decision that was overturned by a higher court on 13 March. During the bail hearings, Tam resigned from the Civic Party and later announced his decision to leave politics, also penning an open letter together with Alvin Yeung, Kwok Ka-ki and Lee Yue-shun, publicized on 15 April, which called for the party to disband. On 22 April 2021, High Court judge Esther Toh again denied him bail after accusing him of signing a letter in September 2019 supporting the Hong Kong Human Rights and Democracy Act.

On 19 August 2022, Tam pleaded guilty to violating the national security law with his sentencing date yet to be determined. He is sentenced to four years and two months in prison.

== Water cannon incident ==
Jeremy Tam was one of the victims of the Water cannon incident on 20 October 2019, which occurred during the 2019–2020 Hong Kong protests. The Police's water cannon attacked Kowloon Mosque on that day and Jeremy Tam was one of those sprayed. Other victims included Phillip Khan, Mohan Chugani, and the executive director of NGO Hong Kong Unison, Phyllis Cheung.

== Works ==
- 逆風飛揚─民航機師手記 [Flying Against the Wind─A Civil Aircraft Officer's Notes]. Economic Daily Press. 2014. ISBN 9789626788325.

Legislative Council of Hong Kong
Preceded by Alan Leong	Member of Legislative Council; Representative for Kowloon East; 2016–2020	Constituency abolished
