= Wong Kwok-kin =

Hong Kong politician

The Honourable Wong Kwok-kin BBS
- 黃國健
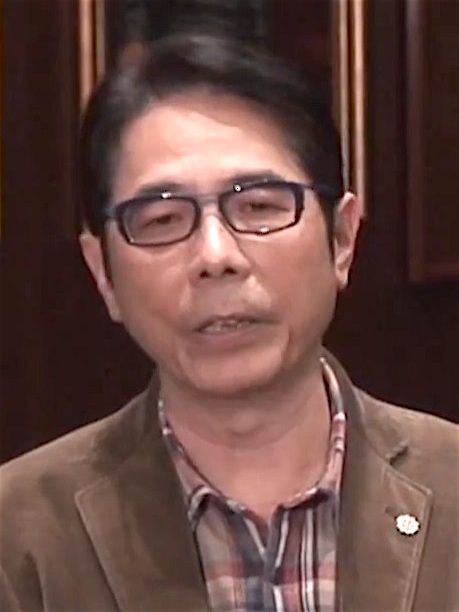

Non-official Member of the Executive Council
- In office 1 July 2017 – 30 June 2022
- Appointed by: Carrie Lam
- Preceded by: Cheng Yiu-tong
- Succeeded by: Ng Chau-pei

Member of the Legislative Council
- In office 1 October 2008 – 31 December 2021
- Preceded by: Chan Yuen-han
- Succeeded by: Constituency abolished
- Constituency: Kowloon East

Chairman of the Hong Kong Federation of Trade Unions
- In office 2000–2009
- Preceded by: Cheng Yiu-tong
- Succeeded by: Ng Chau-pei

Personal details
- Born: May 1952 (age 73) British Hong Kong
- Party: Hong Kong Federation of Trade Unions
- Occupation: Trade Union Worker

Wong Kwok-kin, BBS (黃國健; Yale: Wòhng Gwok Gihn; born May 1952) is a former member of the Legislative Council of Hong Kong representing the Kowloon East constituency, and a former non-official member of the Executive Council of Hong Kong appointed by Carrie Lam in 2017.

Wong is the former chairman of the Hong Kong Federation of Trade Unions (HKFTU) and a member of the Democratic Alliance for the Betterment and Progress of Hong Kong. He is one of Hong Kong's deputies to the National People's Congress of the People's Republic of China.

Wong led HKFTU team to participate in the 2008 Hong Kong legislative election, followed by Chan Yuen Han, a former veteran legislator. Wong won the seat while Chan lost.

Political offices
Preceded by Cheng Yiu-tong	Chairman of the Hong Kong Federation of Trade Unions; 2000–2009	Succeeded by Ng Chau-pei
Preceded by Cheng Yiu-tong	Non-official Member of Executive Council; 2017–2022	Succeeded by Ng Chau-pei
Legislative Council of Hong Kong
Preceded by Chan Yuen-han	Member of Legislative Council; Representative for Kowloon East; 2008–2021	Constituency abolished
