= Chan Kam-lam =

Hong Kong politician (born 1949)

Chan Kam-lam GBS, JP
- 陳鑑林
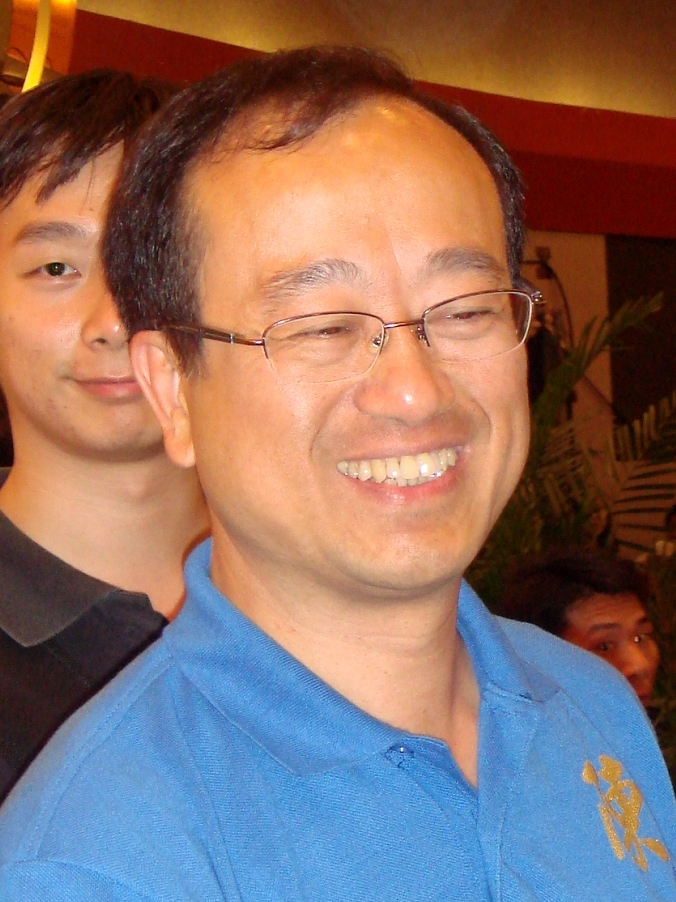

Member of the Legislative Council
- In office 1 October 2000 – 30 September 2016
- Preceded by: New seat
- Succeeded by: Wilson Or
- Constituency: Kowloon East
- In office 11 October 1995 – 30 June 1997
- Preceded by: New constituency
- Succeeded by: Replaced by Provisional Legislative Council
- Constituency: Election Committee
- In office 1 July 1998 – 30 June 2000
- Preceded by: New parliament
- Succeeded by: Seat abolished
- Constituency: Election Committee

Personal details
- Born: 22 January 1949 (age 77) Shantou, Guangdong, China
- Party: Democratic Alliance for the Betterment and Progress of Hong Kong
- Spouse: Tsang Wai-ming
- Children: 3
- Education: Hong Kong Technical College
- Occupation: Legislative Councillor (1998－2016)

Chan Kam-lam
- Traditional Chinese: 陳鑑林
- Simplified Chinese: 陈鉴林
Transcriptions
Standard Mandarin
- Hanyu Pinyin: Chén Jiànlín
Yue: Cantonese
- Jyutping: Can4 Gaam3 Lam4
Southern Min
- Teochew Peng'im: Dang5 Gam3 Lim5

Chan Kam-lam, GBS, JP (Chinese: 陳鑑林; born 22 January 1949) is a former member of the Legislative Council of Hong Kong representing the Kowloon East constituency. He is also a core member of the Democratic Alliance for the Betterment and Progress of Hong Kong (DAB), the largest pro-Beijing party in Hong Kong.

== Early life and education ==
Chan was born in Chaoyang, Guangzhou, China on 22 January 1949. He moved to Hong Kong with his parents when he was around 8 or 9 and lived in a squatter area in his childhood before they were assigned to a resettlement estate in Kwun Tong. He attended an English school in Kowloon City and became a sailor, a desk officer on a ship, for six years after his graduation. He later attended the Hong Kong Technical College, the predecessor of today's Hong Kong Polytechnic University, and graduated in 1971.

== Political career ==
Chan has been a long-time leading figure of the pro-Beijing grassroots organisation Kwun Tong Residents Association. He began his career in politics when he was elected to the Kwun Tong District Board from Ngau Tau Kok in 1988. For his local influence, he was invited to join the Democratic Alliance for the Betterment of Hong Kong (DAB), the flagship pro-Beijing party established in 1992.

In 1995, he ran for the Urban Council but was defeated by Au Yuk-har, a pro-democracy candidate. He was appointed to the Beijing-controlled Provisional Legislative Council on the eve of the handover in 1996. He was one of the ten members of the Election Committee constituency from 1998 to 2000 in the first Legislative Council of Hong Kong. Chan has represented the Kowloon East constituency since 2000 when he partnered with Chan Yuen-han.

He is considered to be the hardliner in the pro-Beijing camp. In 2003, he followed the party line in support of the Hong Kong Basic Law Article 23 legislation, which sparked a protest of more than 500,000 people on 1 July 2003, adding to controversy by remarking that the protesters had been "misled". He was the subject of criticism in 2013 for not having asked a single question for more than four months during the 2012–13 legislative session.

On 11 March 2016, as acting chairman, he presided over the meeting of the Finance Committee at which HK$19.6 billion in additional funding for the controversial Guangzhou–Shenzhen–Hong Kong Express Rail Link (XRL) project was approved in a sudden vote in the face of fierce protest and filibustering attempts from democratic camp legislators. Chan had facilitated the outcome by approving only 36 of 1,262 motions filed by 19 democrats.

He is also a Chinese People's Political Consultative Conference (CPPCC) National Committee member.

The HKSAR Government awarded Chan the Silver Bauhinia Star (SBS) in 2005.

== Family ==
He is married to Tsang Wai-ming, an indigenous inhabitant, and has three children. His eldest son, Chan Chun-kit is a Kwun Tong District Councillor.

== Public positions ==
- Chairman of the Housing Panel of the Legislative Council (2000–01, 2002–03, 2004–05)
- Vice-Chairman of the Housing Panel of the Legislative Council (2001–02, 2003–04)
- Members of the Hong Kong Housing Authority
- Member of the board of directors of the Urban Renewal Authority
- Director of the Hong Kong Mortgage Corporation
- Non-Executive Director of the Securities and Futures Commission
- Member of the Economic and Employment Council
- Member of the Council of the Chinese University of Hong Kong
- President of the Kwun Tong Residents Association
- Member of the Central and Standing Committees and the Democratic Alliance for the Betterment and Progress of Hong Kong
- Vice-President of the Kowloon Federation of Associations
- Executive Director of the Kowloon East Association
- Vice-Chairman of the Finance Committee of the Legislative Council (1998–2000)
- Chairman of the Trade and Industry Panel of the Legislative Council (1998–2000)
- Chairman of the Manpower Panel of the Provisional Legislative Council (1997–1998)
- Vice-Chairman of the Public Accounts Committee of the Provisional Legislative Council (1997–1998)
- Member of the Bilingual Laws Advisory Committee (1995−1997)

Legislative Council of Hong Kong
New constituency	Member of Legislative Council; Representative for Election Committee; 1995–1997	Replaced by Provisional Legislative Council
New parliament	Member of Provisional Legislative Council; 1997–1998	Replaced by Legislative Council
New parliament	Member of Legislative Council; Representative for Election Committee; 1998–2000	Seat abolished
New seat	Member of Legislative Council; Representative for Kowloon East; 2000–2016	Succeeded by Wilson Or
Political offices
Preceded by Lam Sum-shing	Member of Kwun Tong District Council; Representative for Ping Shek; 1999–2007	Succeeded by Bernard Chan Pak-li
Order of precedence
Preceded by Choi Park-lai; Recipients of the Gold Bauhinia Star	Hong Kong order of precedence Recipients of the Gold Bauhinia Star	Succeeded by Vincent Fang; Recipients of the Gold Bauhinia Star
