= Alan Leong =

Hong Kong politician

Alan Leong Kah-kit SC, MH, JP
- 梁家傑
- Leong in 2023

Chairperson of the Civic Party
- In office 19 November 2016 – 27 May 2023
- Leader: Alvin Yeung
- Preceded by: Audrey Eu
- Succeeded by: Position dissolved

Leader of the Civic Party
- In office 8 January 2011 – 30 September 2016
- Preceded by: Audrey Eu
- Succeeded by: Alvin Yeung

Member of the Legislative Council
- In office 1 October 2004 – 30 September 2016
- Preceded by: New seat
- Succeeded by: Jeremy Tam
- Constituency: Kowloon East

Personal details
- Born: 22 February 1958 (age 68) British Hong Kong Ancestral hometown: Xinhui district, Jiangmen city, Guangdong province
- Party: Civic Party
- Spouse: Carol Chen Suk-yi
- Education: La Salle Primary School; Wah Yan College, Kowloon; University of Hong Kong; Hughes Hall, Cambridge

Chinese name
- Traditional Chinese: 梁家傑
- Simplified Chinese: 梁家杰
Transcriptions
Standard Mandarin
- Hanyu Pinyin: Liáng Jiājié
Yue: Cantonese
- Yale Romanization: Lèuhng Gā-giht
- Jyutping: Loeng^{4} Gaa^{1}git^{6}

Alan Leong Kah-kit, SC, MH, JP, (Chinese: 梁家傑; born 22 February 1958) is a former member of the Hong Kong Legislative Council, representing the Kowloon East geographical constituency and former chairman of the now-disbanded Civic Party. He was also vice-chairperson of the Independent Police Complaints Council.

== Early life and education ==
Alan Leong was born on 22 February 1958 at Haven of Hope Hospital in Tsueng Kwan O and grew up in Mong Kok. Leong graduated with an LLB from the University of Hong Kong and an LLM from Hughes Hall, University of Cambridge.

== Political career ==
He was chairman of Hong Kong Bar Association from 2001 to 2003. As chairperson of Hong Kong Bar Association, he mobilised many barristers to participate in the July 1 protests. In the 2007 Legislative Council Election, he was elected with

In January 2011, Leong was elected as the second leader of the Civic Party, succeeding Audrey Eu.

=== 2007 Chief Executive election ===
Leong was nominated by the Civic Party as its party candidate for the 2007 Chief Executive election. He was also supported by the pan-democrats, including the Democratic Party.

Leong later secured 132 nominations and became the first Pan-democracy camp candidate to succeed in joining the chief executive election. In the end Leong lost to Donald Tsang in the CE election on 25 March 2007, with 123 votes from the 800-member Election Committee.

=== "Five Constituencies Referendum" ===
In January 2010, Leong and other four lawmakers, Albert Chan, Tanya Chan, Leung Kwok-hung and Wong Yuk-man resigned their seats to force by-elections, in which they all stood, which they called on to be treated as a referendum to press the Chinese Central Government into allowing universal suffrage in Hong Kong. On 16 May 2010, he was re-elected as a lawmaker in the by-election.

=== Violence may sometimes be THE solution to a problem ===
In a public forum held between the HKU president and college faculties and students dated July 18, 2019 during 2019–2020 Hong Kong protests, Leong claimed that "Violence may sometime be THE solution to a problem", which was refuted by the president, Xiang Zhang.

=== Dissolution of the Civic Party and retirement ===
After the Civic Party failed to form a new executive committee in December 2022, Leong stated the party would be dissolved in 2023. He also announced his intention to retire from politics after the party's dissolution, saying he was "old enough to retire as a politician".

== Personal life ==
Leong is married with three children.

Legislative Council of Hong Kong
New seat	Member of Legislative Council; Representative for Kowloon East; 2004–2016	Succeeded by Jeremy Tam
Party political offices
Preceded by Audrey Eu	Leader of Civic Party; 2011–2016	Succeeded by Alvin Yeung (acting)
Preceded by Audrey Eu	Chairman of Civic Party; 2016–2023	Succeeded by Position dissolved
Legal offices
Preceded by Ronny Tong	Chairman of Hong Kong Bar Association; 2001–2003	Succeeded by Edward Chan
