= Chan Yuen-han =

Hong Kong politician

Chan Yuen-han SBS, JP
- 陳婉嫻
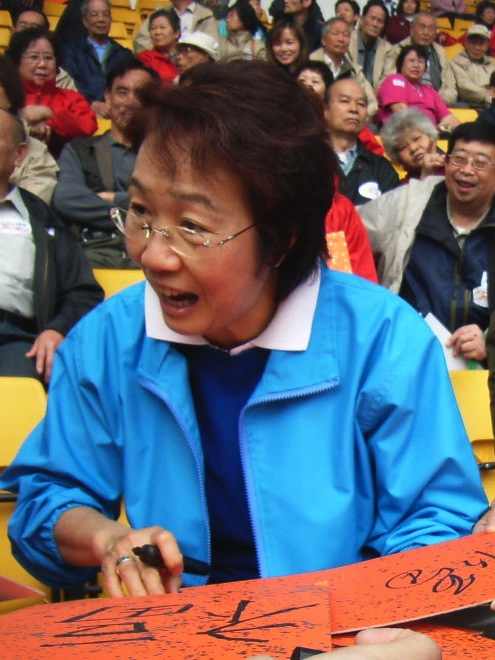

Member of the Legislative Council
- In office 10 October 2012 – 30 September 2016
- Constituency: District Council (Second)
- In office 11 October 1995 – 23 June 1997
- Preceded by: New constituency
- Succeeded by: Constituency abolished
- Constituency: Kowloon North-east
- In office 2 July 1998 – 16 July 2008
- Constituency: Kowloon East
- In office 22 February 1997 – 8 April 1998 (Provisional Legislative Council)
- In office 11 October 1995 – 30 June 1997
- Preceded by: New constituency
- Succeeded by: Replaced by Provisional Legislative Council
- Constituency: Kowloon North-east

Personal details
- Born: 15 November 1946 (age 79) Baoan, China
- Party: Hong Kong Federation of Trade Unions
- Other political affiliations: Democratic Alliance for the Betterment of Hong Kong (1992–2011)
- Education: Hoi Luk Fung School, San Kiu Middle School, Chack Kwan Middle School, Hong Kong Polytechnic University, Guangdong Science and Research University, University of Warwick
- Occupation: Labour Service

Chan Yuen-han
- Traditional Chinese: 陳婉嫻
- Simplified Chinese: 陈婉娴
Transcriptions
Standard Mandarin
- Hanyu Pinyin: Chén Wǎnxían
Yue: Cantonese
- Jyutping: Can^{4} Jyun^{2}haan^{4}

Chan Yuen-han, SBS, JP (Chinese: 陳婉嫻; born 16 November 1946 in Baoan, Shenzhen, Guangdong, China) is a former member of Hong Kong Legislative Council and a noted Hong Kong female trade unionist. She is the vice-chairperson of the Hong Kong Federation of Trade Unions, and was one of the 52 founding members of the Democratic Alliance for the Betterment and Progress of Hong Kong.

In 1988, as FTU vice-chairwoman, she was the first FTU candidate to stand in local elections, winning a seat on Eastern District Council. She joined the Legislative Council of Hong Kong (Legco) in 1995 and was the first female trade unionist to serve as a Legco member.

== Controversies ==
=== Mandatory bus seat belt regulations ===
In January 2026, after the mandatory seat belt rule for seated bus passengers on all franchised and non-franchised buses took effect, Chan wrote in her am730 column "嫻情說理" critiquing the rule.

Her main arguments were to abolish double-decker buses in Hong Kong, calling them a product with strong British colonial characteristics which were unsuitable for the city.

Her comments sparked significant controversy and backlash in Hong Kong media and social media platforms.
