= List of Legislative Council of Hong Kong members 1985–1988 =

This is a list of Members of the Legislative Council in the colonial period (excluding official members) from 30 October 1985 to 25 August 1988 after the first ever elections to the Council were held on 26 September 1985.

After the elections, there were 11 Official Members (including four ex officio), and 46 Unofficial Members, of whom 22 were appointed by the Governor, 12 elected from functional constituencies, one elected from among members of the Urban Council, one elected from among members of the Regional Council, and 10 elected by an electoral college constituency made up of members of all district boards.

== List of Members of the Legislative Council ==
Members who did not serve throughout the term are italicised.

Capacity or Constituency		Members	Party	Political Alignment	Assumed office	Remarks
Pres.	Governor	Sir Edward Youde	Nonpartisan	Government		(Note: Edward Youde died in office on 5 December 1986, and was replaced by David Clive Wilson on 9 April 1987.)
Pres.	Governor	Sir David Clive Wilson	Nonpartisan	Government		
Ex Officio	Chief Secretary	Sir David Akers-Jones	Nonpartisan	Government		(Note: David Akers-Jones was replaced by David Robert Ford on 22 February 1987.)
Ex Officio	Chief Secretary	Sir David Robert Ford	Nonpartisan	Government		
Ex Officio	Financial Secretary	Sir John Henry Bremridge	Nonpartisan	Government		(Note: John Henry Bremridge was replaced by Piers Jacobs on 1 June 1986.)
Ex Officio	Financial Secretary	Piers Jacobs	Nonpartisan	Government		
Ex Officio	Attorney General	Sir Michael David Thomas	Nonpartisan	Government		(Note: Michael David Thomas was replaced by Jeremy Fell Mathews on 1 April 1988.)
Ex Officio	Attorney General	Jeremy Fell Mathews	Nonpartisan	Government		
Appointed	Unofficial	Lydia Dunn	Independent	Conservative	1976	Senior Unofficial Member
Appointed	Unofficial	Chen Shou-lum	Independent	Conservative	1976	(Note: Chen Shou-lum resigned and left office on 31 August 1987, and was replaced by Edward Ho on 1 October 1987.)
Appointed	Unofficial	Peter Wong	Independent	Conservative	1976	
Appointed	Unofficial	Ho Kam-fai	Independent	Conservative	1978	
Appointed	Unofficial	Allen Lee	Independent	Conservative	1978	
Appointed	Unofficial	Hu Fa-kuang	Independent	Conservative	1979	
Appointed	Unofficial	Wong Po-yan	Independent	Conservative	1979	
Appointed	Unofficial	Chan Kam-chuen	Independent	Liberal	1980	
Appointed	Unofficial	John Joseph Swaine	Independent	Conservative	1980	
Functional	First Industrial	Stephen Cheong	Independent	Conservative	1980	
Appointed	Unofficial	Cheung Yan-lung	Independent	Moderate	1981	
Appointed	Unofficial	Selina Chow	Independent	Conservative	1981	
Appointed	Unofficial	Maria Tam	PHKS	Conservative	1981	
Appointed	Unofficial	Henrietta Ip	Independent	Conservative	1982	
Appointed	Unofficial	Chan Ying-lun	Independent	Moderate	1983	
Appointed	Unofficial	Rita Fan	Independent	Conservative	1983	
Appointed	Unofficial	Pauline Ng	Independent	Conservative	1983	
Appointed	Unofficial	Peter Poon	Independent	Conservative	1983	
Appointed	Unofficial	Yeung Po-kwan	Independent	Conservative	1983	
Appointed	Unofficial	Kim Cham	Independent	Conservative	1984	
Electoral	South Kowloon	Jackie Chan	Independent	Liberal	1985	
Functional	Engineering, Architectural, Surveying and Planning	Cheng Hon-kwan	Independent	Conservative	1985	
Functional	Medical	Chiu Hin-kwong	Independent	Conservative	1985	
Electoral	Urban Council	Hilton Cheong-Leen	Civic	Moderate	1985	
Electoral	Sham Shui Po	Chung Pui-lam	PHKS	Conservative	1985	
Functional	First Commercial	Thomas Clydesdale	Independent	Conservative	1985	
Functional	Second Commercial	Ho Sai-chu	Independent	Conservative	1985	
Functional	Social Services	Hui Yin-fat	Independent	Liberal	1985	
Electoral	South New Territories	Richard Lai	Independent	Liberal	1985	
Electoral	Wong Tai Sin	Conrad Lam	Independent	Liberal	1985	
Electoral	Regional Council	Lau Wong-fat	Independent	Conservative	1985	
Functional	Legal	Martin Lee	Independent	Liberal	1985	
Electoral	East Island	Lee Yu-tai	Civic/PHKS	Liberal		
Functional	Finance	David Li	Independent	Conservative	1985	
Electoral	West Island	Liu Lit-for	Independent	Conservative	1985	
Functional	Second Industrial	Ngai Shiu-kit	Independent	Conservative	1985	
Functional	Labour	Pang Chun-hoi	TUC	Pro-Taiwan	1985	
Electoral	Kwun Tong	Poon Chi-fai	PHKS	Moderate	1985	
Appointed	Unofficial	Poon Chung-kwong	Independent	Conservative	1985	
Appointed	Unofficial	Helmut Sohmen	Independent	Conservative	1985	
Functional	Teaching	Szeto Wah	Independent	Liberal	1985	
Electoral	West New Territories	Tai Chin-wah	Independent	Conservative	1985	
Appointed	Unofficial	Rosanna Tam	Independent	Moderate	1985	
Functional	Labour	Tam Yiu-chung	FTU	Pro-China	1985	
Electoral	Kowloon City	Daniel Tse	Independent	Moderate	1985	
Electoral	East New Territories	Andrew Wong	Independent	Moderate	1985	
Appointed	Unofficial	Edward Ho	Independent	Conservative	1987	

== See also ==
- 1985 Hong Kong legislative election
