= List of Legislative Council of Hong Kong members 1988–1991 =

This is a list of Members of the Legislative Council (excluding official members) in the colonial period from 12 October 1988 to 22 August 1991 after the 1988 Legislative Council Elections.

After the elections, there were 11 Official Members (including four ex officio), and 46 Unofficial Members, of whom 20 were appointed by the Governor, 14 elected from functional constituencies, one elected from among members of the Urban Council, one elected from among members of the Regional Council, and 10 elected by electoral college constituencies made up of members of all district boards.

== List of Members of the Legislative Council ==
Members who did not serve throughout the term are italicised.

Capacity or Constituency		Members	Party	Political Alignment	Assumed office	Remarks
President	Governor	Sir David Clive Wilson	Nonpartisan	Government		
Ex Officio	Chief Secretary	Sir David Robert Ford	Nonpartisan	Government		
Ex Officio	Financial Secretary	Sir Piers Jacobs	Nonpartisan	Government		
Ex Officio	Attorney General	Sir Jeremy Fell Mathews	Nonpartisan	Government		
Appointed	Unofficial	Allen Lee	Independent	Conservative	1978	Senior Member
Functional	First Industrial	Stephen Cheong	Independent	Conservative	1980	
Electoral	Regional Council	Cheung Yan-lung	FSHK	Conservative	1981	
Appointed	Unofficial	Selina Chow	Independent	Conservative	1981	
Appointed	Unofficial	Maria Tam	LDF	Conservative	1981	
Appointed	Unofficial	Henrietta Ip	Group of 89	Conservative	1982	
Electoral	East Island	Chan Ying-lun	HKDF	Liberal	1983	
Appointed	Unofficial	Rita Fan	Independent	Conservative	1983	
Appointed	Unofficial	Peter Poon	Independent	Conservative	1983	
Functional	Engineering, Architectural, Surveying and Planning	Cheng Hon-kwan	Independent	Conservative	1985	
Electoral	Sham Shui Po	Chung Pui-lam	LDF	Conservative	1985	
Functional	Second Commercial	Ho Sai-chu	Independent	Conservative	1985	
Functional	Social Services	Hui Yin-fat	Independent	Liberal	1985	
Functional	Legal	Martin Lee	United Democrats	Liberal	1985	
Functional	Finance	David Li	Independent	Conservative	1985	
Functional	Second Industrial	Ngai Shiu-kit	LDF	Conservative	1985	
Functional	Labour	Pang Chun-hoi	TUC	Pro-ROC	1985	
Electoral	Kwun Tong	Poon Chi-fai	Independent	Conservative	1985	
Appointed	Unofficial	Poon Chung-kwong	Group of 89	Conservative	1985	
Functional	Teaching	Szeto Wah	United Democrats/PTU	Liberal	1985	
Electoral	West New Territories	Tai Chin-wah	FSHK	Conservative	1985	
Appointed	Unofficial	Rosanna Tam	Independent	Moderate	1985	(Note: Rosanna Tam resigned and left office on 31 July 1991.)
Functional	Labour	Tam Yiu-chung	FTU	Pro-China	1985	
Electoral	Kowloon City	Daniel Tse	Independent	Moderate	1985	
Electoral	East New Territories	Andrew Wong	Independent	Moderate	1985	
Appointed	Unofficial	Lau Wong-fat	FSHK	Conservative	1985	
Appointed	Unofficial	Edward Ho	BPF	Conservative	1987	
Appointed	Unofficial	Ronald Joseph Arculli	Independent	Conservative	1988	
Appointed	Unofficial	Martin Gilbert Barrow	Independent	Conservative	1988	
Appointed	Unofficial	Paul Cheng	Independent	Conservative	1988	
Electoral	Wong Tai Sin	Michael Cheng	LDF	Conservative	1988	
Appointed	Unofficial	David Cheung	Independent	Conservative	1988	
Functional	Medical and Health Care	Ronald Chow	ADPL	Liberal	1988	
Appointed	Unofficial	Nellie Fong	Independent	Conservative	1988	
Appointed	Unofficial	Peggy Lam	Independent	Conservative	1988	
Electoral	South New Territories	Daniel Lam	FSHK	Conservative	1988	
Appointed	Unofficial	Miriam Lau	Independent	Conservative	1988	
Appointed	Unofficial	Lau Wah-sum	Independent	Conservative	1988	
Functional	Medical	Leong Che-hung	HKDF	Liberal	1988	
Appointed	Unofficial	Leung Wai-tung	HKDF/Independent	Liberal	1988	
Functional	First Commercial	James David McGregor	HKDF	Liberal	1988	
Electoral	South Kowloon	Kingsley Sit	Independent	Conservative	1988	
Electoral	West Island	So Chau Yim-ping	Independent	Conservative	1988	
Appointed	Unofficial	James Tien	LDF	Conservative	1988	
Electoral	Urban Council	Elsie Tu	Independent	Moderate	1988	
Functional	Accountancy	Peter Wong	LDF	Conservative	1988	

== See also ==
- 1988 Hong Kong legislative election
