= 1988 Hong Kong legislative election =

- 22 September 1988

26 (of the 46) unofficial members to the Legislative Council
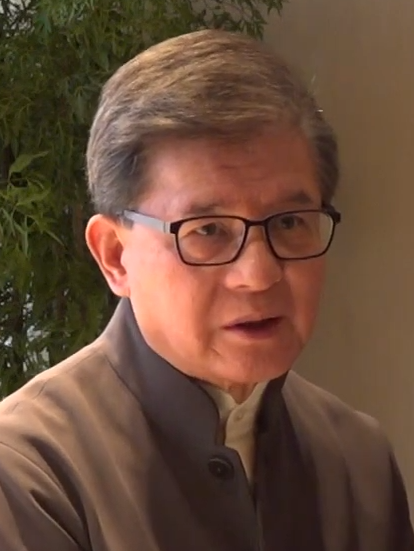

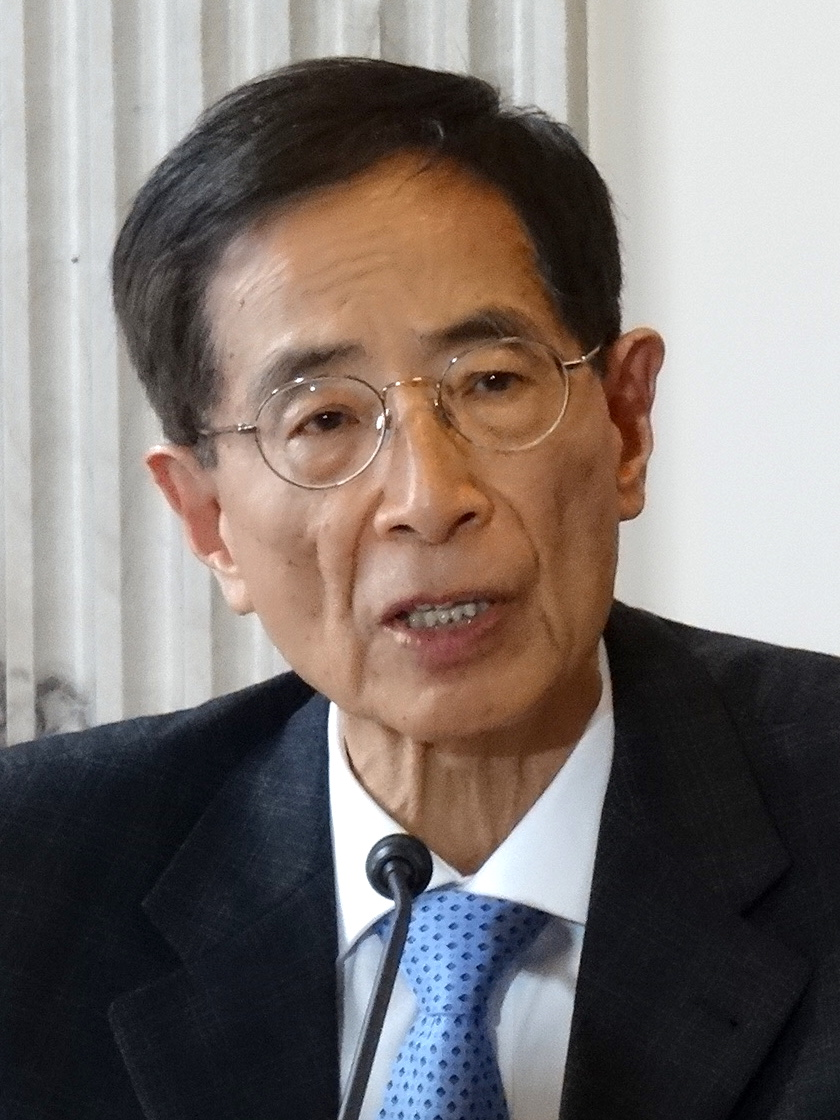
Leader	Vincent Lo	Martin Lee
Alliance	Conservative	Liberal
Leader's seat	N/A	Legal
Seats won	12	6
Seat change	Steady	▼1
Percentage	17.36%	51.36%

The 1988 Hong Kong Legislative Council election was an indirect election for members of the Legislative Council of Hong Kong (LegCo); was held on 22 September 1988. It was the second ever election of the Legislative Council in Hong Kong history based on the 1987 Review of Developments in Representative Government, as the Government's democratisation process according to the agreement of the Sino-British Joint Declaration. There were 12 members elected by Electoral Colleges, 14 members from functional constituencies.

A total of 9,276 out of almost 17,000 registered votes turned out to return 13 candidates in 8 electoral college and 4 functional constituency seats while another 13 seats were returned unopposed. The liberal lobby suffered a major setback in the election as three of their outspoken leaders were defeated.

== Background ==
In May 1987, the government published the Green Paper, 1987 Review of Developments in Representative Government, to consider the next phase of the development of the representative government in Hong Kong after the 1985 Hong Kong electoral reform. The option of the direct elections in 1988 was strongly opposed by the Government of the People's Republic of China. Pro-Beijing organs including the Chinese General Chamber of Commerce and the Hong Kong Federation of Trade Unions were mobilised to send opposing submissions to the Hong Kong government. The Joint Committee on the Promotion of Democratic Government which was formed by pro-democracy activists including Legislative Councillors Martin Lee and Szeto Wah collected of 220,000 signatures demanding the direct elections.

Pressured by the Beijing government, the Hong Kong government issued the White Paper in February 1988 indicated that there was a strong public desire for further development of government, but there was no clear consensus timing or the extent of the introduction of direct elections. The 1988 direct elections proposal was therefore turned down and postponed until 1991. Instead, the government added two new functional constituencies from 12 to 14 and reduced appointed members from 22 to 20. The voting method was also changed to the preferential elimination system.

== Composition ==
The Financial constituency was enlarged into Financial and Accountancy constituency in which the electors of the Finance electoral division remained as the members of the Hong Kong Association of Banks entitled to vote at the general meetings of the Association and electors of the Accountancy electoral division were accountants registered by the Hong Kong Society of Accountants under the Professional Accountants Ordinance.

The Medical constituency were enlarged into Medical and Health Care constituency in which the Medical electoral division was elected by the medical and dental practitioners registered or deemed to be registered under the Medical Registration Ordinance or Dentists Registration Ordinance. The Health Care electoral division were elected by nurses registered and enrolled under the Nurses Registration Ordinance, midwives registered under the Midwives Registration Ordinance, pharmacists registered under the Pharmacy and Poisons Ordinance, and physiotherapists, occupational therapists, medical laboratory technologists, radiographers, and optometrists registered under the Supplementary Medical Profession Ordinance.

== Results ==
The turnout rate for the functional constituencies was 54 percent compared with 57.6 percent in the last election in 1985. The liberal lobby suffered a major setback in the election as three of their outspoken leaders were defeated.

In the functional constituency election, the conservative Group of 88 was forceful in lending its support to members Stephen Cheong Kam-chuen of the First Industrial (Federation of Hong Kong Industries) constituency and Veronica Wu who challenged Jimmy McGregor for the First Commercial (Hong Kong General Chamber of Commerce) constituency. The Group persuaded Ian MacCallum and Philip Kwok Chi-kuen to quit in favour of Wu. McGregor won over Wu by 478 to 236 votes in the end claiming "this is a victory for greater democracy." While in Medical constituency, Dr. Leong Che-hung, a liberal candidate, also ousted Executive Councilor Dr. Chiu Hin-kwong with 1,359 to 816 votes.

In the electoral college elections, the liberal incumbents Conrad Lam Kui-shing was defeated by former district board chairman Michael Cheng Tak-kin in Wong Tai Sin and Desmond Lee Yu-tai defeated by Chan Ying-lun in Hong Kong Island East from the conservative faction. Richard Lai Sung-lung of New Territories South was also defeated by Lam Wai-keung from rural background. Other unelected liberal candidates included Fred Li Wah-ming, Michael Lai Kam-cheung and Choy Kan-pui.

=== Electoral College Constituencies ===
Constituency	Candidates	Affiliation	Votes
Urban Council	Elsie Tu		Uncontested
Regional Council	Cheung Yan-lung	PHKS	19
Regional Council	Tang Kwok-yung		13
Regional Council	Choy Kan-pui	HKAS	8
East Island	Chan Ying-lun	PHKS	21
East Island	Desmond Lee Yu-tai	Civic/ADPL	20
West Island	So Chau Yim-ping	Civic	18
West Island	Liu Lit-for	PHKS	16
West Island	Joseph Chan Yuek-sut	Civic	11
Kwun Tong	Poon Chi-fai	PHKS	21
Kwun Tong	Li Wah-ming	Meeting Point	12
Wong Tai Sin	Michael Cheng Tak-kin	PHKS	16
Wong Tai Sin	Conrad Lam Kui-shing		13
Kowloon City	Daniel Tse Chi-wai		Uncontested
Sham Shui Po	Chung Pui-lam	PHKS	Uncontested
South Kowloon	Kingsley Sit Ho-yin	PHKS	12
South Kowloon	Ng Kin-sun	PHKS	10
South Kowloon	Clement Tao Kwok-lau		5
East New Territories	Andrew Wong Wang-fat		30
East New Territories	Michael Lai Kam-cheung		25
West New Territories	Tai Chin-wah		27
West New Territories	Man For-tai		18
South New Territories	Lam Wai-keung		38
South New Territories	Yeung Fuk-kwong	PHKS	31
South New Territories	Richard Lai Sung-lung	ADPL	20
South New Territories	William Wan Hon-cheung	PHKS	9

=== Functional Constituencies ===
Constituency	Candidates	Affiliation	Votes
First Commercial	James David McGregor		478
First Commercial	Veronica Wu Shao-ching		236
Second Commercial	Ho Sai-chu		Uncontested
First Industrial	Stephen Cheong Kam-chuen		Uncontested
Second Industrial	Ngai Shiu-kit		Uncontested
Financial	David Li Kwok-po		Uncontested
Labour (2 seats)	Pang Chun-hoi		Uncontested
Labour (2 seats)	Tam Yiu-chung		Uncontested
Social Services	Hui Yin-fat		Uncontested
Medical	Edward Leong Che-hung		1,359
Medical	Chiu Hin-kwong		816
Teaching	Szeto Wah		Uncontested
Legal	Martin Lee Chu-ming		Uncontested
Engineering, Architectural, Surveying and Planning	Cheng Hon-kwan		Uncontested
Health Care	Ronald Chow Mei-tak	ADPL	2,866
Health Care	Lam Po-wing		1,801
Health Care	Wong Lung Heng-ling		609
Accountancy	Peter Wong Hong-yuen		366
Accountancy	Peter Chan Po-fun		301
Accountancy	Fanny Lai Ip Po-ping		609

== See also ==
- Democratic development in Hong Kong
- History of Hong Kong
