= West Island (1985 constituency) =

- Former Electoral College constituency for the Legislative Council of Hong Kong
- District: Central and Western District; Southern District
- Region: Hong Kong Island

Former constituency
- Created: 1985
- Abolished: 1991
- Number of members: One
- Replaced by: Hong Kong Island West

West Island was a constituency elected by electoral college for the Legislative Council of Hong Kong in 1985 and 1988, which elects one member of the Legislative Council using the multiple-round elimination system and preferential elimination system respectively. The constituency covers Central and Western District and Southern District on Hong Kong Island.

The constituency is indirectly elected, with members of the District Boards and Urban Council from the two Districts as the electorates. It was renamed as Hong Kong Island West constituency in 1991 with expanded electorates.

== Returned members ==
Elected members are as follows:

Election	Member	Party
1985	Liu Lit-for	Independent
1980s	Liu Lit-for	PHKS
1988	So Chau Yim-ping	Civic

== Election results ==
Only the final results of the run-off are shown.

1988 Legislative Council election: West Island
Party	Candidate	Votes	%	±%
Civic	So Chau Yim-ping	18	40.00	
PHKS	Liu Lit-for	16	35.56	−12.92
Civic	Joseph Chan Yuek-sut	11	24.44	
Civic gain from PHKS		Swing		

1985 Legislative Council election: West Island
Party	Candidate	Votes	%	±%
Independent	Liu Lit-for	16	48.48	
HKAS	Anthony Ng Sung-man	9	27.27	
Independent	Keith Lam Hon-keung	8	24.24	
Independent win (new seat)				
