= South Kowloon (1985 constituency) =

- Former Electoral College constituency for the Legislative Council of Hong Kong
- District: Mong Kok District; Yau Ma Tei District
- Region: Kowloon

Former constituency
- Created: 1985
- Abolished: 1991
- Number of members: One
- Replaced by: Kowloon West

South Kowloon was a constituency elected by electoral college for the Legislative Council of Hong Kong in 1985 and 1988, which elects one member of the Legislative Council using the multiple-round elimination system and preferential elimination system respectively. The constituency covers Mong Kok District and Yau Ma Tei District (now Yau Tsim Mong District) in Kowloon.

The constituency is indirectly elected, with members of the District Boards and Urban Council from the two Districts as the electorates. It was replaced by Kowloon West constituency in 1991.

== Returned members ==
Elected members are as follows:

Election	Member	Party
1985	Jackie Chan	Independent
1988	Kingsley Sit	PHKS

== Election results ==
Only the final results of the run-off are shown.

1988 Legislative Council election: South Kowloon
Party	Candidate	Votes	%	±%
PHKS	Kingsley Sit Ho-yin	12	44.44	
PHKS	Ng Kin-sun	10	37.04	
Independent	Clement Tao Kwok-lau	5	18.52	
PHKS gain from Independent		Swing		

1985 Legislative Council election: South Kowloon
Party	Candidate	Votes	%	±%
Independent	Jackie Chan Chai-keung	14	51.86	
Independent	Ena Yuen Yin-hung	7	25.93	
Independent	Jacob Chan Lai-sang	6	22.22	
FTU	Ip Kwok-chung	0	0	
Independent win (new seat)				
