= Kowloon West =

Area of Hong Kong

Boundary of Kowloon West constituency from 2021

Kowloon West is the western part of Kowloon, covering the Yau Tsim Mong and Sham Shui Po District, with Kowloon City District occasionally included.

== History ==
The boundary of Kowloon West is not strictly defined and hence varies. While traditionally the Kowloon–Canton Railway (now the East Rail line) serves as the separation of eastern and western part, the Kowloon City District, located at the east of the railway, was part of the Kowloon West Legislative Council constituency in order to balance the population between the two halves. Nevertheless, both the Yau Tsim Mong District and Sham Shui Po District have long been regarded as the part of Kowloon West.

West Kowloon, a similar name and sharing similar definition, is also a part of Kowloon West, despite the name usually refers to the reclaimed area located west of the Kowloon Peninsula.

In 1985, "Sham Shui Po" and "South Kowloon" electoral-college constituencies were created. Sham Shui Po consisted of Sham Shui Po District while South Kowloon consisted of Mong Kok District and Yau Ma Tei District. The electoral colleges lasted for two terms until they were replaced by the geographical constituencies in 1991 when the first direct election to the Legislative Council were introduced.

In the 1991 election, "Kowloon West" was consisting of Sham Shui Po, Mong Kok and Yau Tsim Districts, returning two members to the Legislative Council using the two-seat constituency two vote system. All two seats were won by the pro-democracy camp in the electoral landslide, with United Democrats of Hong Kong and Hong Kong Association for Democracy and People's Livelihood gained one each.

The electoral system was overhauled after one term, replaced by the single-constituency single-vote system in the 1995 Legislative Council election with four new constituencies, namely "Kowloon West" and "Kowloon South-west". All two seats were again won by the pro-democrats.

Following the handover in 1997, the "Kowloon West" constituency replaced the colonial constituencies, which included the Kowloon City. It remained in place until 2021 under the change of electoral system, "Kowloon West" was kept but shrank to the 1991-constituency boundary.

== Evolution of constituencies ==
Years \ Districts	Sham Shui Po	Yau Tsim Mong
1985–91	Sham Shui Po	South Kowloon
1991–95	Kowloon West	
1995–97	Kowloon West	Kowloon South-west
1998–2021	Kowloon West	
2021–	Kowloon West	
