= Wong Tai Sin (1985 constituency) =

- Former Electoral College constituency for the Legislative Council of Hong Kong
- District: Wong Tai Sin District
- Region: Kowloon

Former constituency
- Created: 1985
- Abolished: 1991
- Number of members: One
- Replaced by: Kowloon Central

Wong Tai Sin was a constituency elected by electoral college for the Legislative Council of Hong Kong in 1985 and 1988, which elects one member of the Legislative Council using the multiple-round elimination system and preferential elimination system respectively. The constituency covers Wong Tai Sin District in Kowloon.

The constituency is indirectly elected, with members of the District Boards and Urban Council from the Wong Tai Sin District as the electorates. It was replaced by Kowloon Central constituency in 1991.

== Returned members ==
Elected members are as follows:

Election	Member	Party
1985	Conrad Lam	Independent
1988	Michael Cheng	PHKS
1990	Michael Cheng	LDF

== Election results ==
Only the final results of the run-off are shown.

1988 Legislative Council election: Wong Tai Sin
Party	Candidate	Votes	%	±%
PHKS	Michael Cheng Tak-kin	16	55.17	
Independent	Conrad Lam Kui-shing	13	44.83	−6.78
PHKS gain from Independent		Swing		

1985 Legislative Council election: Wong Tai Sin
Party	Candidate	Votes	%	±%
Independent	Conrad Lam Kui-shing	16	51.61	
PHKS	Liu Kwun-sing	15	48.39	
Independent win (new seat)				
