= East Island (1985 constituency) =

- Former Electoral College constituency for the Legislative Council of Hong Kong
- District: Eastern District; Wan Chai District
- Region: Hong Kong Island

Former constituency
- Created: 1985
- Abolished: 1991
- Number of members: One
- Replaced by: Hong Kong Island East

East Island was a constituency elected by electoral college for the Legislative Council of Hong Kong in 1985 and 1988, which elects one member of the Legislative Council using the multiple-round elimination system and preferential elimination system respectively. The constituency covers Eastern District and Wan Chai District on Hong Kong Island.

The constituency is indirectly elected, with members of the District Boards and Urban Council from the two Districts as the electorates. It was renamed as Hong Kong Island East constituency in 1991 with expanded electorates.

== Returned members ==
Elected members are as follows:

Election	Member	Party
1985	Desmond Lee	Civic
1980s	Desmond Lee	ADPL/Civic
1988	Chan Ying-lun	PHKS
1990s	Chan Ying-lun	HKDF

== Election results ==
Only the final results of the run-off are shown.

1988 Legislative Council election: East Island
Party	Candidate	Votes	%	±%
PHKS	Chan Ying-lun	21	51.22	
ADPL (Civic)	Desmond Lee Yu-tai	20	48.78	−11.22
PHKS gain from Civic		Swing		

1985 Legislative Council election: East Island
Party	Candidate	Votes	%	±%
PHKS (Civic)	Desmond Lee Yu-tai	24	60	
Reform	Kwan Lim-ho	16	40	
Independent	Albert Cheung Chi-piu	0	0	
Independent	Lee Kam-kee	0	0	
Independent	Peggy Lam Pei	0	0	
Independent	Chum Ting-pong	0	0	
PHKS win (new seat)				
