= West New Territories (1985 constituency) =

- Former Electoral College constituency for the Legislative Council of Hong Kong
- District: Yuen Long District; Tuen Mun District
- Region: New Territories

Former constituency
- Created: 1985
- Abolished: 1991
- Number of members: One
- Replaced by: New Territories West

West New Territories was a constituency elected by electoral college for the Legislative Council of Hong Kong in 1985 and 1988, which elects one member of the Legislative Council using the multiple-round elimination system and preferential elimination system respectively. The constituency covers Yuen Long District and Tuen Mun District in New Territories.

The constituency is indirectly elected, with members of the District Boards and Urban Council from the two Districts as the electorates. The electorate of the constituency was expanded in 1991.

== Returned members ==
Elected members are as follows:

Election	Member	Party
1985	Tai Chin-wah	Independent
1988	Tai Chin-wah	Independent

== Election results ==
Only the final results of the run-off are shown.

1988 Legislative Council election: West New Territories
Party	Candidate	Votes	%	±%
Independent	Tai Chin-wah	27	60	+5
Independent	William Man For-tai	18	40	−5
Independent hold		Swing		

1985 Legislative Council election: West New Territories
Party	Candidate	Votes	%	±%
Independent	Tai Chin-wah	22	55	
Independent	William Man For-tai	18	45	
Independent	Alfred Tso Shiu-wai	0	0	
Independent	Kingsley Sit Ho-yin	0	0	
Independent	Tang Siu-tong	0	0	
Independent win (new seat)				
