= Kowloon City (1985 constituency) =

- Former Electoral College constituency for the Legislative Council of Hong Kong
- District: Kowloon City District
- Region: Kowloon

Former constituency
- Created: 1985
- Abolished: 1991
- Number of members: One
- Replaced by: Kowloon Central

Sham Shui Po was a constituency elected by electoral college for the Legislative Council of Hong Kong in 1985 and 1988, which elects one member of the Legislative Council using the multiple-round elimination system and preferential elimination system respectively. The constituency covers Kowloon City District in Kowloon.

The constituency is indirectly elected, with members of the District Boards and Urban Council from the Kowloon City District as the electorates. It was replaced by Kowloon Central constituency in 1991.

== Returned members ==
Elected members are as follows:

Election	Member	Party
1985	Daniel Tse	Independent
1988	Daniel Tse	Independent

== Election results ==
Only the final results of the run-off are shown.

1988 Legislative Council election: Kowloon City
Party	Candidate	Votes	%	±%
Independent	Daniel Tse Chi-wai	Unopposed		
Independent hold		Swing		

1985 Legislative Council election: Kowloon City
Party	Candidate	Votes	%	±%
Independent	Daniel Tse Chi-wai	13	54.17	
PHKS	Pao Ping-wing	11	45.83	
Civic	Peter Chan Chi-kwan	0	0	
Independent win (new seat)				
