= Sham Shui Po (1985 constituency) =

- Former Electoral College constituency for the Legislative Council of Hong Kong
- District: Sham Shui Po District
- Region: Kowloon

Former constituency
- Created: 1985
- Abolished: 1991
- Number of members: One
- Replaced by: Kowloon West

Sham Shui Po was a constituency elected by electoral college for the Legislative Council of Hong Kong in 1985 and 1988, which elects one member of the Legislative Council using the multiple-round elimination system and preferential elimination system respectively. The constituency covers Sham Shui Po District in Kowloon.

The constituency is indirectly elected, with members of the District Boards and Urban Council from the Sham Shui Po District as the electorates. It was replaced by Kowloon West constituency in 1991.

== Returned members ==
Elected members are as follows:

Election	Member	Party
1985	Chung Pui-lam	PHKS
1988	Chung Pui-lam	PHKS

== Election results ==
Only the final results of the run-off are shown.

1988 Legislative Council election: Sham Shui Po
Party	Candidate	Votes	%	±%
PHKS	Chung Pui-lam	Unopposed		
PHKS hold		Swing		

1985 Legislative Council election: Sham Shui Po
Party	Candidate	Votes	%	±%
PHKS	Chung Pui-lam	19	70.37	
Nonpartisan	Ambrose Cheung Wing-sum	8	29.63	
Nonpartisan win (new seat)				
