= Kwun Tong (1985 constituency) =

- Former Electoral College constituency for the Legislative Council of Hong Kong
- District: Kwun Tong District
- Region: Kowloon

Former constituency
- Created: 1985
- Abolished: 1991
- Number of members: One
- Replaced by: Kowloon East

Kwun Tong was a constituency elected by electoral college for the Legislative Council of Hong Kong in 1985 and 1988, which elects one member of the Legislative Council using the multiple-round elimination system and preferential elimination system respectively. The constituency covers Kwun Tong District in Kowloon.

The constituency is indirectly elected, with members of the District Boards and Urban Council from the Kwun Tong District as the electorates. It was renamed as Kowloon East constituency in 1991 with expanded electorates.

== Returned members ==
Elected members are as follows:

Election	Member	Party
1985	Poon Chi-fai	Independent
1980s	Poon Chi-fai	PHKS
1988	Poon Chi-fai	PHKS

== Election results ==
Only the final results of the run-off are shown.

1988 Legislative Council election: Kwun Tong
Party	Candidate	Votes	%	±%
PHKS	Poon Chi-fai	21	63.64	
Meeting Point	Li Wah-ming	12	36.36	+36.36
PHKS hold		Swing		

1985 Legislative Council election: Kwun Tong
Party	Candidate	Votes	%	±%
Independent	Poon Chi-fai	18	62.07	
Independent	Cheng Kwan-suen	11	37.93	
Meeting Point	Li Wah-ming	0	0	
Independent win (new seat)				
