= Kowloon West (disambiguation) =

Kowloon West is the western part of Kowloon (and New Kowloon).

Kowloon West may also refer to:

- Kowloon West (1991 constituency)
- Kowloon West (1995 constituency)
- Kowloon West (1998 constituency)
- Kowloon West (2021 constituency)
- West Kowloon
  - West Kowloon Reclamation
- Diocese of Western Kowloon
