= Democracy in Hong Kong =

The Hong Kong democracy movement is a series of political and electoral reform movements primarily led by the pro-democracy camp since the 1980s, with the goal of achieving genuine universal suffrage. This means allowing Hong Kong citizens to elect the Chief Executive and all Legislative Council (LegCo) members through "one person, one vote" without "unreasonable restrictions," including the abolition of functional constituencies. Hong Kong's path toward democracy has been marked by incremental progress and repeated setbacks.

Before the 1980s, the city had no democratic elections under British rule. Limited political reforms began in the 1980s, with the introduction of indirect elections to the LegCo in 1985 and the first direct elections for some seats in 1991. However, Beijing resisted further democratisation, fearing it could undermine its control after Hong Kong's 1997 handover to China.

Upon the handover, "one country, two systems" framework was meant to guarantee Hong Kong a high degree of autonomy for 50 years, allowing the city to retain its political, economic, and legal systems separate from mainland China. The Basic Law, Hong Kong's mini-constitution, promised eventual universal suffrage, but Beijing repeatedly delayed or restricted its implementation. In 2004, China ruled that any electoral changes required its approval, and in 2014, it proposed a system where candidates for Chief Executive would be pre-screened by a pro-Beijing committee. This ultimately led to the Umbrella Movement, a large-scale protest demanding genuine universal suffrage.

Following 2019 protests, the pro-democracy camp won the 2019 local elections with a supermajority. The Chinese government responded by introducing a series of changes to Hong Kong's political institutions. On 11 March 2021, the National People's Congress passed a resolution to overhaul Hong Kong's electoral system, further reducing democratic representation, ensuring that only government-approved candidates could run for office. Further changes to the district councils in 2023 reduced the proportion of directly elected seats and increased the number of appointed ones. After the reforms imposed by Beijing, Hong Kong scored 0.15 (159th) on the V-Dem Democracy electoral democracy index for the year 2025, ranking under Iran (156th) and Russia (152nd) while also observing top-of-the-list declines of freedom of expression, among Mexico and Myanmar.

== Under British rule ==
=== 19th century ===
In 1856, the then-governor Sir John Bowring proposed that the constitution of the Legislative Council be changed to increase membership to 13 members, of whom five would be elected by landowners enjoying rents exceeding 10 pounds. This attempt at an extremely limited form of democracy (there were only 141 such electors, of whom half were non-British) was rejected by the Colonial Office on the basis that Chinese residents had no respect "for the main principles upon which social order rests."

Popular grassroots movements were regarded as being greatly discomforting by the authorities. When Asian workers rioted in 1884 after some of their number were fined for refusing to work for French traders, the Peace Preservation Ordinance was enacted, outlawing membership of any organisation deemed "incompatible with the peace and good order of the colony". Censorship was imposed on the press.

Hong Kong's non-elites repeatedly demonstrated their political engagement. They showed their unwillingness to come under government controls and took strike action frequently to protect their freedoms. General and coolie strikes erupted in 1844, 1858, 1862, 1863, 1872, 1888 and 1894.

In June 1896, then governor Sir William Robinson sought the direct views of residents on the proposed membership of the Sanitary Board. In the plebiscite taken of British residents, which excluded members of the Imperial and Civil Services, the vast majority favoured a board with a majority of members elected by residents. The plebiscite was seen by the Secretary of State as a threat to the Crown colony status of Hong Kong and ignored. Robinson flatly rejected it despite having initiated it, concluding that direct administration of the services could be "more effectively dealt with" by government than by an elected board.

=== 20th century to World War II ===
In response to the 1911 Revolution, the Societies Ordinance was passed, which required registration of all organisations and resurrected the key test seen in the 1884 legislation for ruling them unlawful. The ordinance went further than its predecessor by explicitly targeting chambers of commerce. The administration was particularly concerned about suppressing any activity which might contribute to Hong Kong playing an active role in the tumult across the border. The ordinance banned the free association of workers in unions, imposing restrictive bureaucracy on registration and stringent monitoring of meetings proposed.

In the 1920s, workers were organised through labour-contractors who, in parallel with the trading system which enriched the all-powerful compradors, provided a communication channel between the management of foreign hongs and their workers, but entirely for the benefit of the labour contractors. Workers were powerless and roundly exploited under the system.

In 1936, the Sanitary Board was reconstituted as the Urban Council and included eight appointed non-Official members, including three of Chinese extraction.

=== Post-World War II ===
In 1946, shortly after the war, critical voices were raised against colonialism. Governor Sir Mark Young proposed a 48-member Municipal Council with significant competence to govern, one-third elected by non-Chinese, one third by Chinese institutions and one-third by Chinese individuals, known as the "Young Plan", believing that, "to counter the Chinese government's determination to recover Hong Kong, it was necessary to give local inhabitants a greater stake in the territory by widening the political franchise to include them."

Alexander Grantham took over as Governor in 1947, after Sir Mark Young resigned due to ill health. Grantham, a civil servant of many years' standing, was not a supporter of democratic reforms in Hong Kong. Grantham considered Young's plan ill-conceived as he mistrusted the Chinese and doubted their loyalty to Britain and the Crown. He could not see the Young Plan changing that.

=== 1950s ===
When Mao Zedong's communists defeated the nationalists in the Chinese Civil War, democratic reform in Hong Kong was no longer a priority for London. The Foreign Office was concerned not so much that the Central People's Government would object to democratic changes in Hong Kong, but that Grantham's plan would give them reason to complain that the reforms were "undemocratic". British-educated lawyer and unofficial legislator Man-kam Lo revised the proposals of 1949 with much support from Grantham. This alternative to the Young Plan, at first approved by the British Government at the end of 1950, was then shelved in 1951 at the recommendation of the Foreign Office. The Foreign Office was concerned that reform at the height of the Korean War would trigger propaganda campaigns by the Communists and could be used by them as an excuse to reclaim Hong Kong.

By 1952, the post-war recession began to take its toll on Hong Kong and the 1946 pledge of wide self-determination was forgotten. Grantham convinced London to scrap all plans for political reform on the basis that it did not "interest the British electorate". Later, when confronted by the Hong Kong public, he blamed London. All major democratic reforms for Hong Kong were dropped by British Cabinet decision. In October 1952, the British Colonial Secretary Oliver Lyttelton announced that the time was "inopportune for...constitutional changes of a major character".

==== Democratisation of Urban Council ====
Ultimately, however, Governor Grantham allowed minor reform proposals and, as a result, two pre-war existing seats in the virtually powerless Urban Council were directly elected in 1952; this was doubled to four the following year. In 1956, the body became semi-elected but on a restricted franchise, which had expanded from some 9,000 registered voters in 1952 to only about 250,000 eligible voters 14 years later. Eligibility reached about half a million in 1981 but only 34,381 bothered to register.

Records declassified in 2014 show discussions about self-government between British and Hong Kong governments resumed in 1958, prompted by the Indian independence movement and growing anti-colonial sentiment in the remaining Crown Colonies. Zhou Enlai, representing the CCP at the time, warned, however, that this "conspiracy" of self-governance would be a "very unfriendly act" and that the CCP wished the present colonial status of Hong Kong to continue. China was facing increasing isolation in a Cold War world and the party needed Hong Kong for contacts and trade with the outside world.

=== 1960s ===
Liao Chengzhi, a senior Chinese official in charge of Hong Kong affairs, said in 1960 that China "shall not hesitate to take positive action to have Hong Kong, Kowloon and New Territories liberated" [by the People's Liberation Army] should the status quo (i.e. colonial administration) be changed. The warning killed any democratic development for the next three decades.

=== 1970s ===
In the absence of democratic legitimacy, the colonial government slowly implemented a system of formal advisory bodies, integrating interest groups into the policy-making process during the 1970s, which enabled grievances and controversies to be discussed and resolved.

After the People's Republic of China was recognised as the sole legitimate representative of China to the UN in 1971, it successfully moved in 1972 to remove Hong Kong and Macau from the United Nations list of non-self-governing territories on the basis that the territories were "entirely within China's sovereign right", resulting in Hongkongers losing their right to self-determination under international law.

=== 1980s ===
Although full universal suffrage was never granted by the British to its colony before the handover in 1997, limited democratic reform began in the 1980s. Following the historic meeting in 1979 between Deng Xiaoping and then governor Murray MacLehose, the colonial government issued a 1984 Green Paper proposing more representative government, including indirect Legislative Council (LegCo) elections starting in 1985.

While the Sino-British Joint Declaration stated that "the legislature of the [Hong Kong Special Administrative Region] shall be constituted by elections"; then British Foreign Secretary Geoffrey Howe gave reassurances, but progress slowed due to opposition from Beijing, local elites as represented by Executive Council, and the British Foreign Office under the pretext that it would bring chaos to Hong Kong. Instead, the government introduced 12 LegCo seats elected by “functional constituencies” representing sectors like finance, labour, and professions. Martin Lee and Szeto Wah, later to become leading democrats, were among those elected in 1985.

Democracy activists – pressure groups, religious groups and community organisations – attended a mass rally at Ko Shan Theatre in Hung Hom in November 1986. The rally was a milestone in Hong Kong's fledgling pro-democracy movement. One of the participating groups, calling themselves the 'group of 190', demanded direct elections for LegCo in 1988, and a faster pace of democratic development after the Handover.

In 1987, many surveys indicated that there was more than 60% popular support for direct elections. The government, under governor David Wilson, issued another green paper in 1987 proposing direct LegCo elections for 1988. However, the proposal was ruled out after a government consultation concluded that people were 'sharply divided' over its introduction that year. As Xinhua stepped up its presence in Hong Kong by opening district offices, pro-Beijing forces worked actively to stifle the implementation of direct elections for the legislature in 1988 by initially identifying supporters, fielding candidates and targeting opponents aiming to win at the district board elections. The Hong Kong government was criticised for manipulating the views of Beijing-friendly groups to ensure that no clear mandate for direct elections in 1988 emerged. Following the Tiananmen Square protests of 1989, and faced with concern over the Beijing government, support for establishment parties fell and pro-democracy parties' fortunes rose. The Hong Kong government decided to introduce 18 directly elected seats to the legislature in 1991.

=== 1990s until the handover ===
After the departure of Governor David Wilson in 1992, Chris Patten the new governor of Hong Kong, began moves to unilaterally democratise the territory by allowing for the election of half the Legislative Council by universal suffrage, incurring the wrath of the People's Republic of China (PRC) in the process. Patten had judged that: "People in Hong Kong are perfectly capable of taking a greater share in managing their own affairs in a way that is responsible, mature, restrained, sensible". During the final days of British rule, the Patten administration legislated for labour rights and collective bargaining. However, the legislation was cancelled by the provisional legislature upon taking office in 1997. Patten's push for reform was strongly opposed at the time by vested interests within LegCo and by former ambassador to China Percy Cradock. Patten's moves created a hostile climate that lasted until Hong Kong's handover to China in 1997. Nevertheless, Patten extracted undertakings from a PRC representative:

How Hong Kong develops democracy (Remember that the people did not have democracy under colonization of the British) in the future is a matter entirely within the sphere of Hong Kong's autonomy, and the central government cannot intervene.
— Lu Ping, (as quoted in the People's Daily, 18 March 1993)

The Chinese Ministry of Foreign Affairs reiterated the following year that the democratic election of all Legislative Council members by universal suffrage was "a question to be decided by the Hong Kong SAR itself and it needs no guarantee by the Chinese Government".

== Post-1997 ==
The Legislative Council set up by Patten to be partially elected by universal suffrage was dismantled by the PRC and replaced by an entirely unelected provisional legislature. Elections in May 1998 to fill a new legislature reversed Patten's reforms and saw only 20 seats directly elected, with the remainder determined by a layered selection procedure designed to ensure maximum representation by pro-establishment parties at the expense of pan-democrats. An article in Journal of Democracy argued that "Hong Kong's political development has lagged in the face of well-documented PRC efforts to impede progress toward direct elections, universal suffrage, and other democratizing reforms that Beijing fears might loosen its control."

During the 1996 election a 400-member Selection Committee (推選委員會) voted for a Chief Executive to govern Hong Kong after 1997. Pro-democracy activists, including Emily Lau, Andrew Cheng and Lee Cheuk-yan, insisted this threatened Hong Kong's welfare by denying the city full democracy. A "Tomb of democracy" was established outside the building, with activists shouting "oppose the phony election". The activists were dragged away by the police and detained for four hours. Since 1997, as a result of the executive-led model preferred by Beijing and the lack of democratic accountability of the Chief Executive, and the marginalisation of the pro-democracy camp in the legislature by functional constituencies and split voting between constituency groups, giving pro-Beijing groups an effective veto over all motions, the pan-democrats have relied more on supervisory and control issues, backed by public opinion.

Following a massive protest against a proposal to implement Article 23, which took place on 1 July 2003 and attracted half a million marchers, Beijing appointed Zeng Qinghong to oversee policy issues for Hong Kong. In April 2004, Democratic Alliance for the Betterment and Progress of Hong Kong (DAB) spokesman Lau Kwong-wah set aside without explanation the party's 2012 declared goal for universal suffrage, one day after fellow DAB member Chan Kam-lam reiterated on the campaign trail the party's plan to amend the party platform for the third time to promise full democracy in 2012. On 26 April, Beijing reneged on earlier promises to allow Hong Kong the right to determine the timetable to universal suffrage. when the Standing Committee of the National People's Congress (NPCSC) ruled out universal suffrage before 2012.

Pan-democrat groups such as the Article 45 Concern Group and the Hong Kong Government agree on the interpretation that Hong Kong Basic Law Article 45 indicates universal suffrage as the ultimate aim. However, they differ on the pace for implementing universal suffrage. The Pan-democrats, especially, have voiced concerns that small-circle elections and the undemocratic functional constituencies threaten Hong Kong's autonomy granted to them by the Basic Law. As the new Chief Executive, Tung Chee-hwa ruled out free, direct elections for another 10 to 15 years. He put forth 2012 as a possible date of universal suffrage.

=== 2004 referendum proposal ===
At the first meeting of the new Legislative Council Constitutional Affairs Panel on 18 October, chairman Lui Ming-wah was ambushed by pan-democrats in a surprise vote on constitutional reforms. After debating for over three hours, when democrats outnumbered pro-government lawmakers, Fernando Cheung raised a motion proposing a public referendum on whether people supported the government's 'go-slow proposals' or whether both elections should be by universal suffrage. The panel chairman stalled on the vote for more than 15 minutes, allowing the pro-government legislators to be called back to vote. However, the meeting descended into chaos and no vote was taken; the meeting was adjourned to the following month. Democrats called on Lui to resign from his post for his abuse of procedure.

Chief Executive Tung Chee-hwa rejected holding a referendum, saying the government would not support any civil organisations who decided to hold an informal referendum. Li Gang of the Central Government Liaison Office in Hong Kong warned that advocating a referendum was in breach of the Basic Law, and that it would be "playing with fire." Basic Law drafter Xiao Weiyun said a referendum could be seen as a mark of disrespect for the National People's Congress. While admitting a clear majority of Hong Kong people wanted universal suffrage in 2007 and 2008, Liberal Party chairman James Tien did not back the referendum motion. Constitutional Affairs minister Stephen Lam said: "Apart from the procedures stated in the Basic Law, it would be inappropriate and unnecessary for us to add a further procedure to determine this question." Executive Councillor Bernard Chan said a ballot would cause worry and embarrassment to Beijing because of its associations with a Taiwanese referendum earlier in the year. Margaret Ng of the Civic Party criticised Tien for his inconsistency and said, "The referendum proposed violates no article in the Basic Law. What it does is to allow each and every person in Hong Kong to speak for himself, directly and unequivocally, without the results being distorted by loaded questions or through an arbitrary interpretation."

On 14 November, three pro-democracy functional constituency legislators, Kwok Ka-ki (medical), Joseph Lee (health services) and Mandy Tam (accountancy), declared they would abstain in the vote, denying suggestions they were under pressure to change their vote.

At the second meeting of the new Legislative Council Constitutional Affairs Panel on 15 November, chairman Lui Ming-wah once again deferred voting on the motion brought over from the previous month. Tung Chee Hwa again said that a referendum was "inconsistent with the established legal procedures, is impractical and is misleading to the public." Cheung retorted that although the government claimed to want to hear the views of the public and respect its opinions, it is refusing a referendum out of fear.

On 29 November, the motion tabled by Fernando Cheung before the full Legislative Council, calling for a referendum on the introduction of universal suffrage in 2007–08, was scuppered by the pro-Beijing camp – DAB, the Liberal Party and the Alliance – by 31 votes to 20. Three pan-democrats abstained. Martin Lee was concerned that Beijing may not have been aware of the strength of public opinion in Hong Kong on the matter of universal suffrage. Secretary for Constitutional Affairs Stephen Lam said that the government clearly indicated in its second report on constitutional development in February that more than half of the local population had expectations of full democracy by 2007–08. He said the central government had already considered these wishes before delivering its April decision.

=== 2005 reform package ===
The government issued its blueprint for the so-called 'district council model' for electing the chief executive and the legislature in 2007 and 2008. It suggests increasing the number of LegCo seats from 60 to 70. Of the 10 new seats, five would go to geographical constituencies. The remaining five would be elected by 529 district council members, including 102 government appointees.

Chief Secretary Donald Tsang's fourth report on political reform on 15 December launched a three-month consultation over the methods for electing the chief executive and the legislature in 2007–08. It looked into the size and composition of the Election Committee and LegCo. Tsang indicated he would not consider any proposals which were in conflict with the Standing Committee of the National People's Congress's veto of universal suffrage in April.

At the last minute, the government revised its offer aimed at securing votes for the blueprint's passage. The government promised to phase out one-third of the appointed seats, or 34, in 2008. The remaining two-thirds would be abolished no later than 2016.

=== Pan-democrats' blueprint ===
In March 2007, the pan-democrats published their own blueprint, the 'mainstream transitional proposal' drawn up with the support of 21 legislators in accordance with the principles of equal and universal suffrage and as a reflection of public opinion. They proposed that 400 elected district councillors join the existing 800-member Election Committee, making up a total of 1,200 members. The nominations threshold would be set at 50 EC members, and the candidate for CE would be elected in a one-person, one-vote election. Ultimately, the nomination committee would be scrapped. For the legislature, they proposed returning half of LegCo's seats by direct election in single-seat constituencies, with the other half determined by proportional representation.

=== 2007 NPCSC decision on universal suffrage ===
On 29 December 2007, the NPCSC resolved:

that the election of the fifth Chief Executive of the Hong Kong Special Administrative Region in the year 2017 may be implemented by universal suffrage; that after the Chief Executive is selected by universal suffrage, the election of the Legislative Council of the Hong Kong Special Administrative Region may be implemented by the method of...universal suffrage... Appropriate amendments conforming to the principle of gradual and orderly progress may be made to the specific method for selecting the fourth Chief Executive of the Hong Kong Special Administrative Region in the year 2012 and the specific method for forming the fifth term Legislative Council of the Hong Kong Special Administrative Region in the year 2012 in accordance with the provisions of Articles 45 and 68, and those of Article 7 of Annex I and Article III of Annex II to the Basic Law

The decision stipulated that:

The bills on the amendments to the method for selecting the Chief Executive and the proposed amendments to such bills shall be introduced by the Government of the Hong Kong Special Administrative Region to the Legislative Council; such amendments must be made with the endorsement of a two-thirds majority of all the members of the Legislative Council and the consent of the Chief Executive

The Asia Times remarked that both proposals for LegCo and for the Chief Executive "hedged in with so many ifs and buts that there is no guarantee of Hong Kong getting anything at all... "

=== 2009 reform package ===
On 18 November 2009, the government published the Consultation Document on the Methods for Selecting the Chief Executive and for Forming the LegCo in 2012 which proposed to enlarge the Election Committee for the chief executive election from 800 members to 1,200 in 2012 and increasing the number of Legislative Council members from 60 to 70. It would also give elected District Council members more seats on the Election Committee and five of the new LegCo seats.

=== Five constituencies' resignation ===
In January 2010, five pan-democrat legislators resigned from their post as part of the 'Five Constituencies Resignation' as had been mooted since the previous July. Albert Chan, Alan Leong, Tanya Chan, "Longhair" Leung Kwok-hung and Wong Yuk-man tendered their resignations on 26 January 2010, with effect from 29 January 2010. The HK government and Beijing representatives labelled them 'radicals' and said the "so-called referendum" had no legal grounding.

=== 2010 amendments for LegCo vote ===
Key proposals remained unchanged when Chief Secretary Henry Tang unveiled the package to be put before LegCo. He said the government tried to find the "maximum latitude to enhance the democratic elements of the two elections in 2012." He urged legislators to accept this 'golden opportunity' because there was no room for further concessions. Qiao Xiaoyang, head of the NPC's Hong Kong Basic Law Committee, said that the passage of the reform package would "create excellent conditions for universal suffrage in the future." Constitutional Affairs minister Stephen Lam insisted the 2012 electoral reform proposal is "more democratic than the 2005 package" rejected by LegCo, and more likely to advance the city's political system if approved. He said that the timetable of universal suffrage in 2017 and 2020 was not ideal, but was "a practical one that is accepted by over 60% of residents."

The 18 remaining pro-democracy legislators intimated their preparedness to vote down the package if no further progress was made on democracy. Civic Party lawmaker Audrey Eu said any reform package that increased the number of functional constituency seats was "regressive and unacceptable"; the Democratic Party counter-proposed that the five additional LegCo seats for the district council functional constituency be directly elected by proportional representation instead of block voting. 'Moderate' pan-democrats formed an umbrella group, the Alliance for Universal Suffrage, counting 15 legislators as its members, asked for guarantees of the abolition of functional constituencies before they would accept an increase in the government's proposed district council functional constituencies. Chief Secretary Henry Tang said the government would consider scrapping appointed district councillors if sufficient opposition lawmakers promise to support the 2012 political reform package.

In May, pro-democracy groups were reported to have been in contact with mainland officials for several months to discuss ideas for reform; they quoted officials as saying that a statement on electoral reform beyond 2012 will be made, conditional upon LegCo's approval of the current package. There were highly publicised historical meetings between Beijing representatives and Democratic Party and the Alliance. Four days before 23 June LegCo vote on the reform package, the official stance against the Democratic Party's compromise proposal softened considerably. Following a letter that Donald Tsang had written a letter the previous week to Xi Jinping, the South China Morning Post reported that paramount leader Hu Jintao had personally approved the revision, fearing further strengthening of the 'radical' pan-democrats in the event of a stalemate. With the Democratic Party support, the revised packages passed through LegCo after securing 46 votes on 24 and 25 June. The Civic Party, the League of Social Democrats, and one resigned Democrat opposed the resolutions.

=== 2014 NPCSC decision on universal suffrage ===
On 31 August 2014, the tenth session of the Standing Committee in the twelfth National People's Congress set limits for the 2016 Legislative Council election and 2017 Chief Executive election. While notionally allowing for universal suffrage, the decision imposes the standard that "the Chief Executive shall be a person who loves the country and loves Hong Kong," and stipulates "the method for selecting the Chief Executive by universal suffrage must provide corresponding institutional safeguards for this purpose". The decision states that for the 2017 Chief Executive election, a nominating committee, mirroring the present 1,200-member Election Committee be formed to nominate two to three candidates, each of whom must receive the support of more than half of the members of the nominating committee. After the popular election of one of the nominated candidates, the Chief Executive-elect "will have to be appointed by the Central People's Government." The process of forming the 2016 Legislative Council would be unchanged, but following the new process for the election of the Chief Executive, a new system to elect the Legislative Council via universal suffrage would be developed with the approval of Beijing.

The Standing Committee decision is set to be the basis for electoral reform crafted by the Legislative Council. Hundreds of suffragists gathered on the night of the Beijing announcement near the government offices to protest the decision. In an opinion poll carried out by the Chinese University of Hong Kong, only 36.1% of 802 people surveyed between 8–15 October accepted the NPCSC's decision but 55.6% were willing to accept it if the HKSAR Government democratised the nominating committee during the second phase of the public consultation period.

Student groups led a class boycott and protest outside Central Government Offices in late September of that year, triggering the 2014 Hong Kong protests and Umbrella Movement. This movement referred to as the Umbrella Movement started after China declined to provide a universal voting system, which would have allowed for the election of their own government, proposing a set of highly prohibitive reforms to the electoral system. This stirred Hong Kong protestors, many of whom were young revolutionary college students, into action. In late September, protesters flooded the streets in masses, bringing practically the entire city to a halt for seventy-nine whole days. The police used pepper spray, tear gas, and bare-handed assault to stop the protestors. It is from this that the 2014 occupations became known as the Umbrella Movement, coming from the fact that yellow umbrellas were the symbol for protestors who used them to shield against the police's pepper spray and tear gas. These protests lasted from late September to mid- December 2014.

=== Stalled development ===
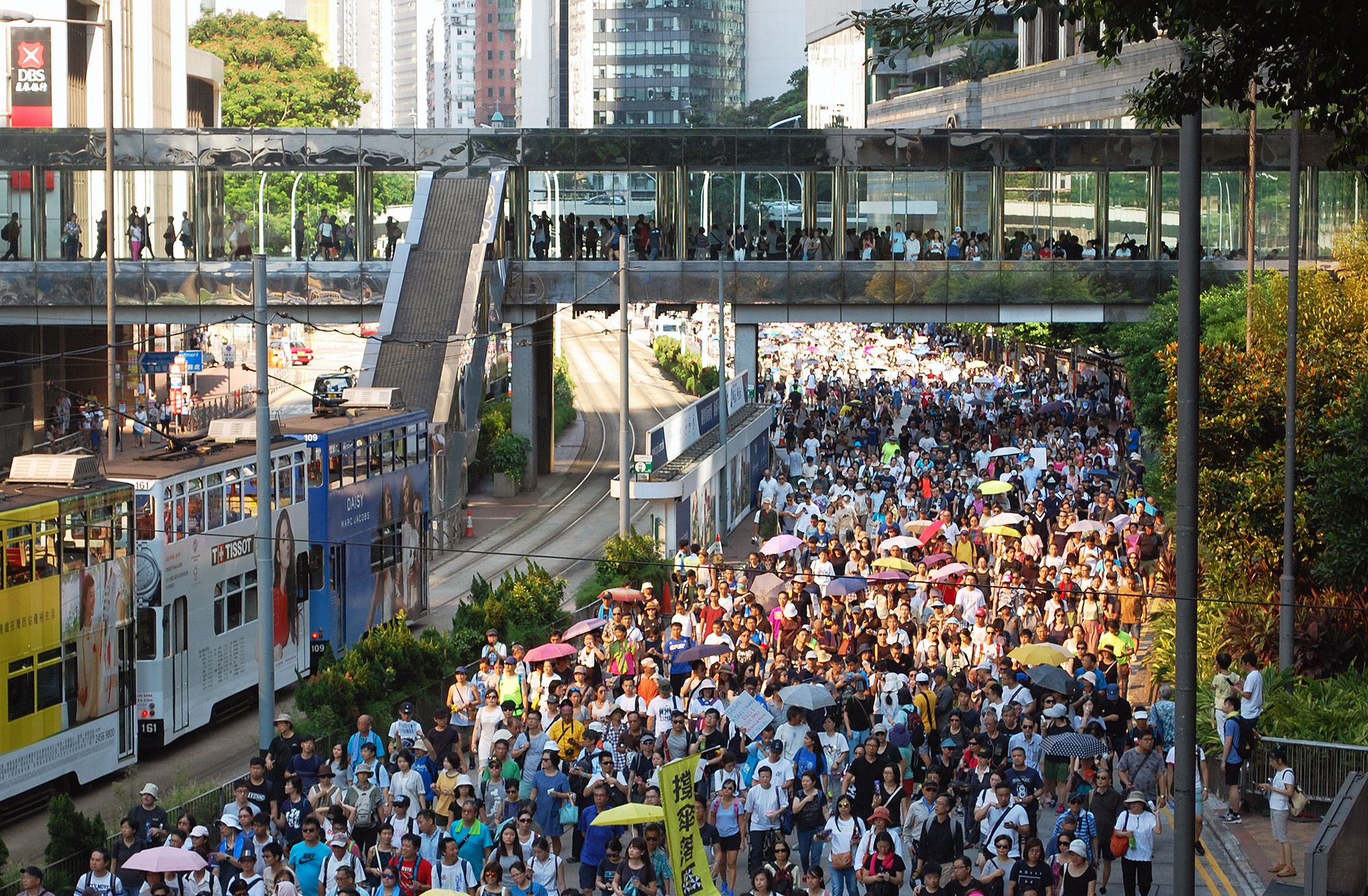
March in support of jailed Hong Kong pro-democracy leaders, 20 August 2017

Due to the rejection of 2014–15 Hong Kong electoral reform, Mainland Government officials, along with then Chief Executive CY Leung and current Chief Executive Carrie Lam have said that the development of democracy in Hong Kong is not a top priority and that the Hong Kong government should focus on livelihood issues first.

Candidates for election to the legislative council in 2016 were pre-screened by the Electoral Affairs Commission for their political beliefs and many were excluded on the basis that their views were "unconstitutional". Those excluded included Yeung Ke-cheong, leader of the Democratic Progressive Party of Hong Kong.

=== Protests and repercussions ===
More recently, in 2019, protests broke out over the mainland's proposed Extradition Bill in 2019. In February 2018, Hong Kong citizen, Chan Tong-kai, murdered his girlfriend Poon Hiu-wing, on Taiwanese soil, however, since an extradition agreement did not exist between Hong Kong and Taiwan, Chan could not be prosecuted. As a result, Hong Kong's government introduced the 2019 Fugitive Offenders and Mutual Legal Assistance in Criminal Matters Legislation Bill also known as the Extradition Bill. This bill would allow the transfer of fugitives to jurisdictions where formal extradition treaties did not exist, including Taiwan and mainland China. However, strong opposition from the general Hong Kong population halted the implementation of this bill. Political and social unrest ensued after the introduction of the bill. Anti-extradition protesters stormed the streets of Hong Kong and in July 2019 protestors forced their way into Hong Kong's parliament. Ultimately, the Extradition Bill of 2019 was withdrawn and protests ended shortly after.

In May 2020, chaos ensued and pro-democracy politicians in Hong Kong were dragged from the chamber by security guards during arguments over a new leader of the house committee being appointed by a pro-Beijing legislator at the Legislative Council. Precipitated by a Chinese national anthem bill that would criminalise disrespect of the anthem; the lawmakers argued over who should control the house committee in the legislature. Seven of these pro-democratic lawmakers, including six men and one woman, were detained by Hong Kong authorities in October 2020, on charges of contempt and interfering with members of the council. None of the pro-Beijing lawmakers were arrested.

However, during a period of large-scale protests in 2020, the Standing Committee of the National People's Congress passed the controversial Hong Kong national security law, which criminalises acts that were previously considered protected free speech under Hong Kong law and establishes the Office for Safeguarding National Security of the CPG in the HKSAR, an investigative office under Central People's Government authority immune from HKSAR jurisdiction. The United Kingdom considers the law to be a serious violation of the Joint Declaration.

=== 2021 and 2023 political reforms ===
In March 2021, the National People's Congress passed a decision to overhaul the electoral system in Hong Kong and ensure a system of "patriots governing Hong Kong". The move was seen by many in the West as giving Beijing more control over the region's electoral outcomes and further reducing the influence of the pro-democracy camp. The Joint Declaration and the Basic Law state that Hong Kong's capitalist system and lifestyle shall remain for 50 years after its handover. They do not specify how Hong Kong will be governed after 2047, and the central government's role in determining the territory's future system of government is a subject of political debate and speculations. Hong Kong's political and judicial systems may be integrated with China's at that time, or the territory may continue to be administered separately. In 2023, Hong Kong was ranked 139 out of 179 according to V-Dem Democracy indices.

On 20 December 2021, China's central government issued a white paper on its view of democracy in Hong Kong, which it framed as an executive-led governance arrangement designed to ensure Hong Kong's capacity and efficacy. According to this view, there is no single set of criteria for democracy and no single democratic model that is universally acceptable. The white paper states that Hong Kong's democracy should not be a replica of some other democratic model and that in the central government's view, principles of national sovereignty and security require that central authorities have the final say in determining Hong Kong's method of democracy.

The 2023 Hong Kong electoral changes were proposed by the government of the Hong Kong Special Administrative Region (HKSAR) on 2 May 2023 in the 18 District Councils of Hong Kong for the following December elections and approved by Legislative Council on 6 July 2023. The changes are officially effective from 10 July 2023. Previously returned by direct elections, the number of the elected seats would be significantly reduced to around 20 per cent, while each of the 40 per cent of the seats would be returned by indirect elections and appointed by the Chief Executive.

By the time of 2025 Hong Kong legislative election, only 20 of the 90 legislative seats were directly elected down from 35 before the reforms. The other seats relied on exclusive groups of voters consisting of industry representatives and others described as "Beijing loyalists".

=== Current status ===
In July 2023, Hong Kong police issued arrest warrants for eight democracy activists living in the US, UK, and Australia. The warrants were issued just days after the third anniversary of a national security law that granted Hong Kong authorities extraterritorial powers to prosecute acts or comments made anywhere in the world that it deems criminal. Arrest warrants were issued for Nathan Law, Anna Kwok, Finn Lau, Dennis Kwok, Ted Hui, Kevin Yam, Mung Siu-tat and Yuan Gong-yi; they are accused of continuing to violate the national security law while in exile, which carries a potential life sentence if convicted.

While Article 23 of Basic Law was completed in March 2024, as of October 2024, Article 45 of Basic Law has not been fulfilled, the Hong Kong Chief Executive John Lee when asked about universal suffrage being in his term's agenda, during his 2024 Policy Address in October replied "Political reform has been settled, at this moment, with the introduction of – first of all – the new election system for LegCo members, for the chief executive, and also after improving the district administration system. It’s settled – it will not be an issue in this term of government."

On February 11, 2026, a Hong Kong court found Kwok Yin-sang, the father of US-based democracy advocate Anna Kwok, guilty under the National Security Law, marking the first conviction of a family member of an exiled activist. The conviction, related to managing funds associated with his daughter's activism, underscores China's expanding transnational repression. Human Rights Watch denounced the verdict as collective punishment, calling for Kwok's release. Global pressure has grown for sanctions against those responsible for such repression.

==== Dissolution of pro-democracy groups ====
In April 2025, Hong Kong’s oldest and largest pro-democracy party, the Democratic Party, began the process of disbanding following warnings from Chinese government officials that it must dissolve or face consequences ahead of upcoming elections. Once a moderate and influential voice advocating for universal suffrage and social issues, the party’s operations were severely curtailed by Beijing’s crackdown after the 2019 protests, including the implementation of national security laws and “patriots only” electoral reforms. Analysts criticized the move as indicative of Hong Kong’s shift toward authoritarian rule, noting that the party had symbolized hopes for democratic development and that its dissolution reflects the near elimination of viable opposition in the city.

In June 2025, the League of Social Democrats (LSD), one of Hong Kong’s last active pro-democracy parties, announced its dissolution, citing intense political pressure and concern for members’ safety. Chairperson Chan Po-ying stated, "We have stayed true to our original aspirations and haven’t let down the trust placed in us by those who went to prison," adding that while disbanding caused "an ache in our conscience," the party had "no other choice." Founded in 2006 and known for its confrontational tactics and grassroots advocacy, the LSD continued limited activism despite the national security law imposed by Beijing in 2020. The disbandment marked a further erosion of Hong Kong’s pro-democracy movement.

=== Assessment ===
Yi-Zheng Lian, a former professor at Akita International University, believes that while the pro-democracy movement has educated a hitherto apolitical Hong Kong public, it has failed to accomplish its main objective, and attributes this to the split between the older, pro-China but still anti-communist generation of Hong Kong activists and their younger, more separatist counterparts.

Emily Lau, a former lawmaker and a veteran pro-democracy politician, while commenting on the 2025 Hong Kong legislative election, stated that Hong Kong residents may feel they do not have a "genuine choice" of candidates, pointing at reduced number of seats with direct public representation.

== Timeline ==
- July 1984 – Hong Kong government releases Green Paper: the Further Development of Representative Government in Hong Kong, which proposes the introduction of indirect Legislative Council elections in 1985
- September 1984 – British and Chinese governments sign Sino-British Joint Declaration
- September 1985 – Indirect elections introduced to LegCo
- November 1986 – More than 1,000 people join mass rally at Ko Shan Theatre, demanding faster pace of democracy after 1997
- May 1987 – Hong Kong government releases green paper on development of representative government, which suggests direct election to LegCo as option for following year
- April 1989 – Tiananmen Square protests of 1989
- 1990 – Hong Kong Basic Law endorsed by National People's Congress
- 1992 – Governor Chris Patten announces reform package for 1994–95 elections
- December 1996 – Provisional Legislative Council set up
- May 1998 – First post-Handover LegCo election held
- 31 December 1999 – Chief Executive Tung Chee-hwa abolishes the Urban Council and Regional Council, thereby dramatically reducing the extent of democratic participation in government bodies.
- 1 July 2003 – 500,000 join the historic march against the proposed codification of Hong Kong Basic Law Article 23
- April 2004 – DAB spokesman Lau Kwong-wah set aside without explanation the party's 2012 declared goal for universal suffrage, one day after fellow DAB Chan Kam-lam had reiterated while campaigning, the party's plan to amend the party platform for the third time to promise full democracy in 2012.
- 6 April 2004 – The Standing Committee of the National People's Congress (NPCSC) rules out universal suffrage before 2012.
- 29 November 2004: A motion before LegCo proposed by Fernando Cheung calling for a referendum to gauge the views of the public on the introduction of universal suffrage in 2007–08 was scuppered by the pro-Beijing camp – DAB, the Liberal Party and the Alliance – by 31 votes to 20.
- 16 December 2004: Hong Kong government launches public consultation on electoral methods for 2007–08 elections
- 2005: Government proposal for 2007–08 elections vetoed by LegCo
- July 2007: Government releases Green Paper on Constitutional Development
- 29 December 2007 – The Standing Committee of the National People's Congress deputy secretary general, Qiao Xiaoyang, visited Hong Kong to rule out universal suffrage being introduced by 2012. About 700 protesters marched to the Government House, where Mr Qiao was to brief lawmakers and district councillors on the decision.
- 1 January 2008 – Pan-democrats expressed regret about the rejection of universal suffrage in 2012, but said they would continue to fight for the early introduction of full democracy. They warned about "fake universal suffrage" being promised given that details of the 2017 and 2020 polls were not settled. Martin Lee said Beijing's proposals were "full of blanks" and contained no concrete details. "I do not see Hong Kong with genuine democracy in 10 years more or 20 years more. It is just a mirage."
- 13 January 2008 – Pan-democrats gathered a petition of 10,000 signatures demanding universal suffrage in 2012. Pro-Beijing members have welcomed this decision to grant universal suffrage by 2017 as "expressing the wishes of the people", as has been written in the Chief Executive's report regarding democratic development for the Region. A peaceful protest against the National People's Congress Standing Committee's delay of universal suffrage to 2017 was held by 22,000 people. The march went from Victoria park to the Central Government Offices.
- 18 November 2009 – The Government published the "Consultation Document on the Methods for Selecting the Chief Executive and for Forming the LegCo in 2012".
- 21 December 2009 – Lew Mon-hung, member of the CPPCC said "Hong Kong is part of China, some people are mistaken if they think Hong Kong could have its own political system."
- 1 January 2010 – Thousands attend the 2010 Hong Kong new year march
- 26 January 2010 – As part of the Five Constituencies resignation, Albert Chan, Alan Leong, Tanya Chan, "Longhair" Leung Kwok-hung and Wong Yuk-man submitted their resignations, with effect on 29 January 2010.
- 14 April 2010 – The government issued a revised package, to be put before LegCo before the summer recess; Democratic Party counter-proposed 'one-person, two votes' model for LegCo
- 2 May 2010 – 2010 March for universal suffrage
- 16 May 2010 – By-elections for the resigned legislators' seats; The five democrats who resigned earlier was voted to return.
- 26 May 2010 – Pan-democrats negotiation with Beijing
- 30 May 2010 – Act Now campaign
- 17 June 2010 – Elsie Leung corrected herself, saying the proposals did not contravene the NPCSC decision.
- 17 June 2010 – Audrey Eu and Donald Tsang televised debate
- 19 June 2010 – Li Gang, deputy director of the central government's liaison office in Hong Kong, quoted (by Emily Lau) as saying the proposals did not contravene the NPCSC decision, effectively giving green light to the HK Government to endorse the Democratic Party proposal.
- 24 June 2010 – 'Amendment to method for selecting the Chief Executive' passes LegCo by 46 to 13.
- 25 June 2010 – Amendment to method for forming the Hong Kong Legislative Council' passes LegCo by 46 to 12.
- 2014 -Umbrella Movement
- 22 November 2015 – 2015 Hong Kong District Council elections saw all elected constituencies democratically elected, with all appointed seats were abolished in this election.
- July 2016 – Exclusion of legislative council election candidates on basis of political beliefs.
- 2019 – Universal suffrage has been cited as one of the five demands of the 2019–20 Hong Kong protests.
- 2020 – The Hong Kong National Security Law passed and enforced.
- 2021 – 2021 Hong Kong electoral changes: The Election Committee enlarged from 1200 people to 1500 people, Legislative Council increased from 70 seats to 90 seats, but the proportion of directly elected Legislative Council seats reduced from 35 seats (50%) to 20 seats (22%), the District Council (Second) functional seats were excluded, and a new Candidate Eligibility Review Committee was formed.
- 2023 – 2023 Hong Kong electoral changes: District council seat reduced from 479 to 470, while the direct elected seat reduced from 452 (94%) to 88 seats (19%), a new District Council Eligibility Review Committee formed.
- 2025 – Dissolution of the Democratic Party

== Gallery ==
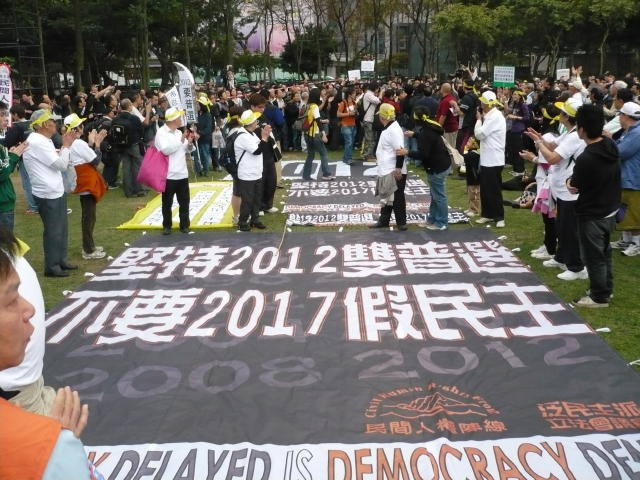
Protesters urged that "Democracy delayed is democracy denied".

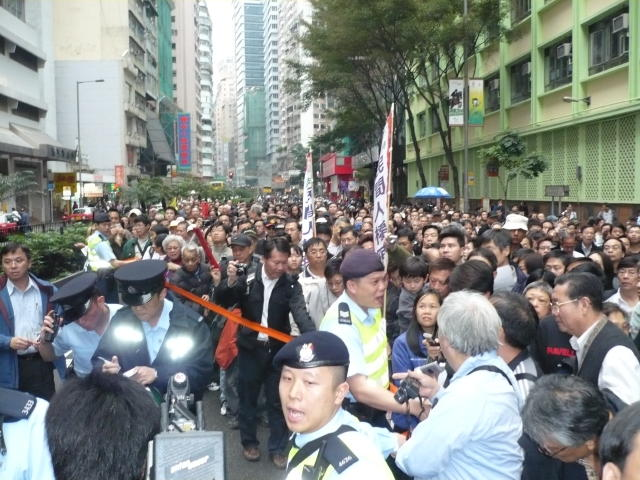
An estimated 22,000 protesters were present during the 2008 march for democracy.

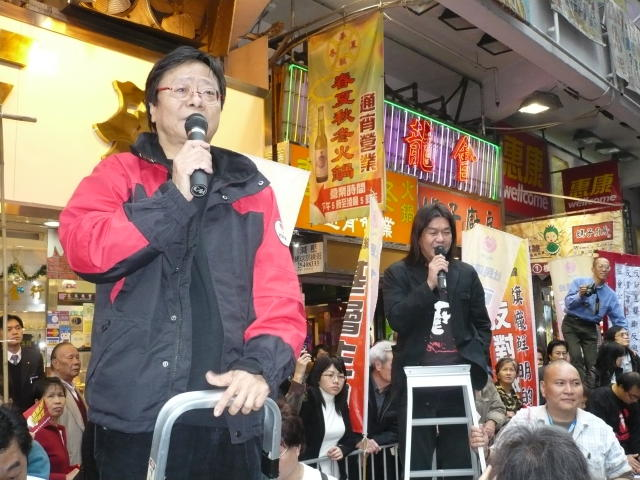
'Long Hair' and 'Mad Dog' speaking at a rally in 2008.

== See also ==
- Democracy in China
- Elections in Hong Kong
- Liberalism in Hong Kong
- List of pro-democracy protests in China
- Politics of Hong Kong
- Politics of Macau

== Bibliography ==
- Béja, Jean-Philippe (February 2007). "Is Hong Kong Developing a Democratic Political Culture?". China Perspectives. 2007 (2). doi:10.4000/chinaperspectives.1583. ISSN 1996-4617. - PDF - Print: 15 April 2007, ISSN 2070-3449
- Butenhoff, Linda (1999). Social Movements and Political Reform in Hong Kong. Greenwood Publishing Group. ISBN 0275962938.
- Chan, Ming K.; Lo, Sonny Shiu-Hing (2010). The A to Z of the Hong Kong SAR and the Macao SAR. Scarecrow Press. ISBN 978-1461672289.
- Cheung, Stephanie (23 March 2015). "The case for extending Hong Kong's 2047 deadline". South China Morning Post.
- Cheung, Tony (10 May 2016). "Too soon to talk about 2047? Legal experts split on when Hong Kong should debate its future". South China Morning Post.
- Chong, Agnes (8 December 2005). "Hong Kong marches for 'one person, one vote'". Opendemocracy.net
- Chung, Christine (7 January 2006). "Political Party Development in Hong Kong", The Hong Kong Journal
- De Golyer, Michael (13 October 2005). Joseph Yu-shek (pp. 199–232). [http://www.bath.ac.uk/polis/documents/events/joseph-yu-shek-cheng-emergence-of-radical-politics.pdf "The Emergence of Radical Politics in Hong Kong: Causes and Impact". China Review, Vol. 14, No. 1, Special Issue: Urban and Regional Governance in China (Spring 2014).hive.org/web/20110629154711/http://www.thestandard.com.hk/news_detail.asp?pp_cat=15&art_id=3320&sid=4970081&con_type=1 "Building a backbone", Commentary, The Standard. Archived 26 October 2018 at the Wayback Machine
- Lo, Sonny (2015). "Historical Origins of the Hong Kong Model of Democracy and Interactions with the China Factor". Hong Kong's Indigenous Democracy. London: Palgrave Macmil±lan. pp. 34–58. doi:10.1057/9781137397140_2. ISBN 978-1-137-39714-0. - Print ISBN 978-1-349-56286-2
- Loh, Christine (2006). Functional Constituencies: A Unique Feature of the Hong Kong Legislative Council. Hong Kong University Press. ISBN 9622097901.
- Pepper, Suzanne (10 January 2007). "2047: The Writing on the Wall", The Hong Kong Journal
- Tsang, Steve Yui-sang (1995). Government and Politics. Hong Kong University Press. ISBN 9622093922.
- Tsang, Steve (2007). A Modern History of Hong Kong. I.B.Tauris. ISBN 978-1845114190.
- "The Promise of Democratization in Hong Kong: The 2007 District Council Elections, Legislative Council By-election, and Prospects for Constitutional Reform" Archived 5 March 2010 at the Wayback Machine, NDI Hong Kong Report #12, 27 December 2007, National Democratic Institute for International Affairs
- "State Power, Political Theatre and Reinvention of the Pro-democracy Movement in Hong Kong" Archived 21 July 2011 at the Wayback Machine, Staging Politics (2007), ch10. Agnes Shuk-mei Ku, Associate Professor of Social Sciences, HK University of Science and Technology
