= Keith Lamb =

Keith Lamb may refer to:

- Keith Lamb (executive) (born 1946), former chief executive at Middlesbrough F.C
- Keith Lamb (musician) (born 1952), lead singer and founding member of the Australian band Hush

== See also ==
- Keith Lam (born 1940), Hong Kong real estate investor and politician
