= East New Territories (1985 constituency) =

- Former Electoral College constituency for the Legislative Council of Hong Kong
- District: North District; Tai Po District; Shatin District
- Region: New Territories

Former constituency
- Created: 1985
- Abolished: 1991
- Number of members: One
- Replaced by: New Territories East; New Territories North

East New Territories was a constituency elected by electoral college for the Legislative Council of Hong Kong in 1985 and 1988, which elects one member of the Legislative Council using the multiple-round elimination system and preferential elimination system respectively. The constituency covers North District, Tai Po District and Shatin District in New Territories.

The constituency is indirectly elected, with members of the District Boards and Urban Council from the three Districts as the electorates. It was divided and replaced by the New Territories East and New Territories North constituencies in 1991.

== Returned members ==
Elected members are as follows:

Election	Member	Party
1985	Andrew Wong	Independent
1988	Andrew Wong	Independent

== Election results ==
Only the final results of the run-off are shown.

1988 Legislative Council election: East New Territories
Party	Candidate	Votes	%	±%
Independent	Andrew Wong Wang-fat	30	54.55	−0.85
Meeting Point	Michael Lai Kam-cheung	25	45.45	
Independent hold		Swing		

1985 Legislative Council election: East New Territories
Party	Candidate	Votes	%	±%
Independent	Andrew Wong Wang-fat	29	53.70	
Independent	Pang Hang-yin	25	46.30	
Independent	Liu Ching-leung	0	0	
Independent	Wong Yuen-cheung	0	0	
Independent	Wai Hon-leung	0	0	
Independent win (new seat)				
