= South New Territories (1985 constituency) =

- Former Electoral College constituency for the Legislative Council of Hong Kong
- District: Tsuen Wan District; Islands District; Sai Kung District
- Region: New Territories

Former constituency
- Created: 1985
- Abolished: 1991
- Number of members: One
- Replaced by: New Territories South; New Territories East

West New Territories was a constituency elected by electoral college for the Legislative Council of Hong Kong in 1985 and 1988, which elects one member of the Legislative Council using the multiple-round elimination system and preferential elimination system respectively. The constituency covers Tsuen Wan District, Islands District, and Sai Kung District in New Territories.

The constituency is indirectly elected, with members of the District Boards and Urban Council from the two Districts as the electorates. It was divided and replaced by New Territories South and New Territories East in 1991.

== Returned members ==
Elected members are as follows:

Election	Member	Party
1985	Daniel Lam	Independent
1988	Richard Lai	Independent

== Election results ==
Only the final results of the run-off are shown.

1988 Legislative Council election: South New Territories
Party	Candidate	Votes	%	±%
Independent	Daniel Lam Wai-keung	38	38.78	−6.38
PHKS	Yeung Fuk-kwong	31	31.63	
ADPL	Richard Lai Sung-lung	20	20.41	−23.21
PHKS	William Wan Hon-cheung	9	9.18	
Independent gain from ADPL		Swing		

1985 Legislative Council election: South New Territories
Party	Candidate	Votes	%	±%
Independent	Richard Lai Sung-lung	34	54.84	
Independent	Daniel Lam Wai-keung	28	45.16	
Independent	John Ho Tung-ching	0	0	
Independent win (new seat)				
