= Michael Cheng (politician) =

Hong Kong politician (1938–2026)

Michael Cheng Tak-kin JP
- 鄭德健

Member of the Legislative Council
- In office 12 October 1988 – 22 August 1991
- Preceded by: Conrad Lam
- Constituency: Wong Tai Sin

Personal details
- Born: 1938 British Hong Kong
- Died: 17 October 2026 (aged 88)
- Party: Progressive Hong Kong Society (1980s); Liberal Democratic Federation (1990–97); Progressive Alliance (1997–2005); Democratic Alliance for the Betterment and Progress of Hong Kong (after 2005)
- Education: La Salle College; Grantham College of Education; University of Hong Kong (BA); Chinese University of Hong Kong (MA)
- Occupation: School principal

Michael Cheng Tak-kin, JP (traditional Chinese: 鄭德健; simplified Chinese: 郑德健; 1938 – 17 October 2026) was a Hong Kong politician who was a member of the Legislative Council of Hong Kong and Wong Tai Sin District Board.

== Life and career ==
Born in Hong Kong, Michael Cheng studied at the La Salle College in his youth. Cheng obtained his bachelor's degree in History and Political Science from the University of Hong Kong and master's degree in education from the Chinese University of Hong Kong. He was the principal of the Po Leung Kuk CFA No.1 College.

Cheng was first elected as the Wong Tai Sin District Board member in 1985, representing the residents in Tsz Wan Shan (later representing the Tsz Wan East constituency), and continually served in the Board through the transfer of the sovereignty until his retirement in 2007. In 1988 election, he defeated the pro-democracy incumbent Conrad Lam from the Wong Tai Sin electoral college constituency consisting of members of the Wong Tai Sin District Board.

Cheng's political stance was considered conservative. On the legislation of the Hong Kong Bill of Rights Ordinance in 1990, he worried that the Bill would provide the protection for the criminals and made the police difficult to maintain law and order. In 1990, he became the member of the pro-business conservative Liberal Democratic Federation of Hong Kong. As the electoral college was to be abolished and replaced by directly elected seats in the 1991 Legislative Council election, Cheng decided not to seek re-election.

He later on became member of the Hong Kong Progressive Alliance when the Liberal Democratic Federation was merged into it in the late 1990s, and the Democratic Alliance for the Betterment and Progress of Hong Kong when the two parties merged in 2005. He retired from the Wong Tai Sin District Council in 2007.

Cheng died on 17 October 2026, at the age of 88.
