= Keith Lam =

Hong Kong real estate investor and politician

Keith Lam Hon-keung, OBE, JP (Chinese: 林漢強; born 25 April 1940) is a Hong Kong real estate investor and politician. He was an unofficial member of the Legislative Council of Hong Kong from 1984 to 1985 and a member of the Election Committee since 1998.

== Business career ==
Lam was an articled clerk of M.K. Lam & Co. Solicitors & Notaries, a law firm founded by Sir Man Kam Lo, between May 1962 and April 1967. Lam later developed his business in real estate business and financial field in Hong Kong. He served in numerous companies, including district board member of the Far East Exchange from 1975 to 1986, managing board member of the Kowloon-Canton Railway Corporation from 1998 to 2002. He was also deputy chairman of the New Environmental Energy Holdings until 2009 and executive director of the company from 2006 to 2008. He was a non-executive director of the Wah Ha Realty Company since 1993.

He had been council member of the Hong Kong Stock Exchange from 1983 to 1986 and director of the Hong Kong Securities Clearing Company from 1990 to 1994. He had also been the chairman of the Institute of Securities Dealers.

He has also served as the chairman of the Hong Kong Buddhist Hospital and vice-president of the Hong Kong Buddhist Association. He was also a supervisor of Buddhist Mau Fung Memorial College and Buddhist Chi Hong Chi Lam Memorial College. He is also director of Buddhist Heung Hoi Ching Kok Lin Association and Buddhist Li Chong Yuet Ming Nursing Home for the Elderly.

Lam also started his career in Mainland China in the 1990s. He was a senior consultant of the Association for Stock Enterprises, Jiangsu Province, investment consultant of Yangzhou Municipal People's Government.

== Public career ==
Lam was also involved in the community services. He served as president of Rotary Club of Hong Kong South from 1976 to 1977 and was bestowed a Badge of Honour in 1977. He was first made unofficial Justice of the Peace on 18 May 1981. He was appointed unofficial member of the Legislative Council in 1984. He served for a year until the Legislative Council was reorganised as the government was introducing election to the council for the first time. He ran in the first indirect Legislative Council election in Hong Kong Island West in 1985 but was defeated by Liu Lit-for. In 1993, he was awarded Officer of the Order of the British Empire (OBE) for his community services in Hong Kong. In 1994, he was appointed Hong Kong District Adviser to the Xinhua News Agency.

Since then, he had also sat on many public positions, including member of the Estate Agents Authority and the Social Welfare Advisory Committee 2000 to 2006. He is a fellow of the Hong Kong Institute of Directors since June 1981, a fellow of Chartered Management Institute September 2006 and a member of the British Institute of Management. He has been the member of the Election Committee since 1998 in the Religious Subsector representing the Hong Kong Buddhist Association.

== Personal life ==
Lam married to his first wife and had a son named Anthony Lam Chi-tat, a solicitor known for presiding over marriage ceremonies. He later married his second wife Lavien Chan Lai-kuen, and had two sons, Adrian and Andre, the marriage lasted until 2008. In 2015, Lam filled two writs against his son Anthony and daughter-in-law Cana Cheung Shui-yee who refused to give him back shares in the company after he hell ill in 2013 and needed money to pay hefty medical bills.
