= Peter Poon =

Peter Poon Wing-cheung 潘永祥 OBE, LLD, JP

Member of the Legislative Council
- In office 27 September 1983 – 22 August 1991
- Appointed by: Sir Edward Youde; Sir David Wilson

Personal details
- Born: 1934 (age 91–92) Hong Kong
- Education: Wah Yan College, London University, Chinese University of Hong Kong
- Occupation: Accountant

Peter Poon Wing-cheung (born 1934, Hong Kong) is an accountant and politician.

After a secondary education at Wah Yan College, Poon studied law at London University and was admitted to The Law Society. He later studied for a legum doctoral degree at the Chinese University of Hong Kong. He is a fellow of both the Australian Society of Accountants and the Hong Kong Society of Accountants and a member of the Singapore Society of Accountants. He is also an authorised company auditor in England and accountant in Australia.

He was an appointed member of the Legislative Council of Hong Kong from 1983 to 1991.

== Personal ==
He is married to Teresa, also an accountant.
