= Chen Shou-lum =

Hong Kong engineer and politician (1925–2018)

Chen Shou-lum CBE, JP
- 陳壽霖

Member of the Executive Council
- In office 1983 – 31 August 1987
- Appointed by: Sir Edward Youde

Member of the Legislative Council
- In office 6 October 1976 – 31 August 1987
- Appointed by: Sir Murray MacLehose; Sir Edward Youde
- Succeeded by: Edward Ho

Personal details
- Born: 30 August 1925 Guangzhou, Guangdong, China
- Died: 27 August 2018 (aged 92)
- Relations: Doris Lai-chue Chen
- Children: 2
- Education: University of London (MSc); Chinese University of Hong Kong (DSc)
- Occupation: Company director

Chen Shou-lum, CBE, JP (Chinese: 陳壽霖; 30 August 1925 – 27 August 2018) was a Hong Kong engineer, business executive and politician.

He was born and raised in mainland China. He studied engineering at the University of London and obtained a doctoral degree from the Chinese University of Hong Kong. He was the fellow of the Imperial College, University of London, Institution of Electrical Engineers and Hong Kong Institution of Engineers. He was elected as the president of the Institute of Engineers (was called Hong Kong Engineering Society by that time) in 1972.

He was also the director of several big corporations in the colony, such as the Hong Kong Electric Holdings Ltd., Cable & Wireless (Hong Kong) Ltd. and Hang Seng Bank Ltd. in the 1980s.

He came into politics when he was appointed to the Legislative Council of Hong Kong in 1976 and Executive Council in 1983. He resigned from the councils in 1987.

He also served in many public offices, serving as the chairman of the Hong Kong Productivity Council from 1977 to 1981, deputy chairman of the Hong Kong Polytechnic, chairman of the council of City Polytechnic of Hong Kong, and member of the university council of the Chinese University of Hong Kong.

He was made Justice of Peace, officer of the Order of the British Empire and commander of the Order of the British Empire in 1984. Chen died in August 2018, at age 92.

Political offices
Preceded by Chung Sze-yuen	Chairman of Hong Kong Productivity Council; 1977–1981	Succeeded by Allen Lee
