= 1985 Hong Kong legislative election =

- 26 September 1985

24 (of the 46) unofficial members to the Legislative Council

The 1985 Hong Kong Legislative Council election was an indirect election for members of the Legislative Council of Hong Kong (LegCo) held on 26 September 1985. It was the first ever election of the Legislative Council in Hong Kong which marked the beginning of the Hong Kong representative democracy.

After the Sino-British Joint Declaration, the Hong Kong government decided to start the process of democratisation in Hong Kong based on the consultative document Green Paper: the Further Development of Representative Government in Hong Kong published on 18 July 1984. There were 12 members elected by the Electoral Colleges and 12 by the functional constituencies, four official members and the rest of the seats were appointed by the governor.

== Composition ==
=== Electoral colleges ===
12 unofficial members were elected by the electoral college comprised all members of the District Boards, the Urban Council and the new Regional Council. In order to achieve a more balanced and adequate representation the District Boards would be grouped into ten geographical constituencies each representing approximately 500,000 people. The remaining two seats would be provided by the two special constituencies formed respectively by members of the Urban Council and the Regional Council. The interests of the Heung Yee Kuk would be represented through the Regional Council. The 12 constituencies formed from the electoral college were:

1. East Island: Eastern District and Wan Chai District
2. West Island: Central & Western District and Southern District
3. Kwun Tong: Kwun Tong District
4. Wong Tai Sin: Wong Tai Sin District
5. Kowloon City: Kowloon City District
6. Sham Shui Po: Sham Shui Po District
7. South Kowloon: Mong Kok District and Yau Ma Tei District
8. East New Territories: North District, Tai Po District and Shatin District
9. West New Territories: Yuen Long District and Tuen Mun District
10. South New Territories: Tsuen Wan District (including Tsing Yi), Islands District and Sai Kung District
11. Urban Council
12. Regional Council

=== Functional constituencies ===
Nine functional constituencies returned 12 unofficial members to the Legislative Council. The commercial, industrial, and labour constituencies would each return two unofficial members to the Legislative Council. The remaining six constituencies would each return one unofficial member. The nine functional constituencies and their representative organizations were:

1. Commercial (2 seats):
  1. First Commercial: Hong Kong General Chamber of Commerce
  2. Second Commercial: Chinese General Chamber of Commerce
2. Industrial (2 seats):
  1. First Industrial: Federation of Hong Kong Industries
  2. Second Industrial: Chinese Manufacturers' Association of Hong Kong
3. Financial: Hong Kong Association of Banks
4. Labour (2 seats): all registered employee trade unions
5. Social Services: Hong Kong Council of Social Service
6. Medical: Hong Kong Medical Association
7. Teaching
8. Legal
9. Engineering, Architectural, Surveying and Planning

== Results ==
=== Electoral College Constituencies ===
The Electoral College constituencies adopted the exhaustive ballot voting method. Only the results of the final rounds are shown below.

Constituency	Candidates	Party	Votes
Urban Council	Hilton Cheong-Leen	Civic	16
Urban Council	Elsie Tu		13
Provisional Regional Council	Lau Wong-fat		Uncontested
East Island	Desmond Lee Yu-tai	Civic/PHKS	24
East Island	Kwan Lim-ho	Reform	16
East Island	Albert Cheung Chi-piu		0
East Island	Lee Kam-kee		0
East Island	Peggy Lam Pei		0
East Island	Chum Ting-pong		0
West Island	Liu Lit-for		18
West Island	Anthony Ng Sung-man	HKAS	16
West Island	Keith Lam Hon-keung		8
Kwun Tong	Poon Chi-fai		18
Kwun Tong	Cheng Kwan-suen	Civic	11
Kwun Tong	Li Wah-ming	Meeting Point	0
Wong Tai Sin	Conrad Lam Kui-shing		16
Wong Tai Sin	Liu Koon-sing		15
Kowloon City	Daniel Tse Chi-wai		13
Kowloon City	Pao Ping-wing	PHKS	11
Kowloon City	Peter Chan Chi-kwan	Civic	0
Sham Shui Po	Chung Pui-lam	PHKS	19
Sham Shui Po	Ambrose Cheung Wing-sum		8
South Kowloon	Jackie Chan Chai-keung		12
South Kowloon	Ena Yuen Yin-hung		7
South Kowloon	Jacob Chan Lai-sang		6
South Kowloon	Ip Kwok-chung	FTU	0
East New Territories	Andrew Wong Wang-fat		29
East New Territories	Pang Hang-yin		25
East New Territories	Liu Ching-leung		0
East New Territories	Wong Yuen-cheung		0
East New Territories	Wai Hon-leung		0
West New Territories	Tai Chin-wah		22
West New Territories	Man For-tai		18
West New Territories	Alfred Tso Shiu-wai		0
West New Territories	Kingsley Sit Ho-yin		0
West New Territories	Tang Siu-tong		0
South New Territories	Richard Lai Sung-lung		34
South New Territories	Lam Wai-keung		28
South New Territories	John Ho Tung-ching		0

=== Functional Constituencies ===
Constituency	Candidates	Party	Votes
First Commercial	Thomas Clydesdale		470
First Commercial	A. C. William Blaauw		320
Second Commercial	Ho Sai-chu		Uncontested
First Industrial	Stephen Cheong Kam-chuen		Uncontested
Second Industrial	Ngai Shiu-kit		544
Second Industrial	Ho Yuk-wing		31
Financial	David Li Kwok-po		Uncontested
Labour (2 seats)	Pang Chun-hoi	TUC	Uncontested
Labour (2 seats)	Tam Yiu-chung	FTU	Uncontested
Social Services	Hui Yin-fat		76
Social Services	Mak Hoi-wah		41
Social Services	Chan Sau-han		22
Medical	Chiu Hin-kwong		1,168
Medical	Edward Leong Che-hung		1,049
Teaching	Szeto Wah		12,706
Teaching	Luk Yip Jing-ping		2,655
Teaching	Ko Gra-yee	Civic	2,165
Teaching	Chan Yat-tong		577
Teaching	Wu Siu-wai		409
Legal	Martin Lee Chu-ming		488
Legal	Henry Denis Litton		312
Legal	Edmund Chow Wai-hung	Civic	43
Engineering, Architectural, Surveying and Planning	Cheng Hon-kwan		1,129
Engineering, Architectural, Surveying and Planning	Raymond Ho Chung-tai		1,074
Engineering, Architectural, Surveying and Planning	To Leung-tak		496

== See also ==
- Democratic development in Hong Kong
- History of Hong Kong
