= So Chau Yim-ping =

Hong Kong executive and politician (1927–2018)

So Chau Yim-ping BBS, JP
- 蘇周艷屏

Member of the Legislative Council
- In office 12 October 1988 – 22 August 1991
- Preceded by: Liu Lit-for
- Succeeded by: Yeung Sum, Huang Chen-ya
- Constituency: West Island

Personal details
- Born: 22 October 1927 Hong Kong
- Died: 26 January 2018 (aged 90) Hong Kong
- Party: Hong Kong Civic Association (1980s)
- Education: Ying Wa Girls' School
- Occupation: Managing Director

So Chau Yim-ping, BBS, JP (22 October 1927 – 26 January 2018) was a Hong Kong executive and politician who was a member of the Legislative Council of Hong Kong and Southern District Board.

So Chau Yim-ping had worked in the printing and paper products industry for more than 30 years and was managing director of several printing companies. She is the vice-chairman of supervisory committee of the Hong Kong Printers Association and the president of the Southern District Industrialists Association and the honorary president of the Hong Kong Federation of Women. She is also the honorary trustee of the Hong Kong Baptist University Foundation.

She was appointed to the Southern District Board from April 1985 until September 1994 and elected to the Legislative Council through the West Island electoral college consisting of the Central and Western and Southern District Board members in 1988 Legislative Council election.

She was appointed justice of the peace in 1988 and awarded the Bronze Bauhinia Star in 2001.
