= Chan Ying-lun =

Chan Ying-lun OBE, JP
- 陳英麟

Member of the Legislative Council
- In office 27 September 1983 – 25 August 1988
- Appointed by: Sir Edward Youde; Sir David Wilson
- In office 12 October 1988 – 22 August 1991
- Preceded by: Desmond Lee Yu-tai
- Succeeded by: Martin Lee; Man Sai-cheong
- Constituency: East Island

Personal details
- Born: 6 October 1950 (age 75) Hong Kong
- Party: Progressive Hong Kong Society (1980s); Democratic Foundation (1990s)
- Spouse: Tan Yang-cher
- Children: 1
- Education: Cognito College; University of Hong Kong (BSocSc)
- Occupation: Corporate Affairs Manager

Chan Ying-lun
- Traditional Chinese: 陳英麟
- Simplified Chinese: 陈英麟
Transcriptions
Standard Mandarin
- Hanyu Pinyin: Chén Yīnglín
Yue: Cantonese
- Jyutping: can4 jing1 leon4

Chan Ying-lun, OBE, JP (Chinese: 陳英麟, born 6 October 1950) is a former member of the Legislative Council of Hong Kong and Eastern District Board.

He was brought up in the Shau Kei Wan squatters area and graduated from Cognito College and University of Hong Kong. He worked as the corporate affairs manager of the San Miguel Brewery Ltd.

He was first elected as the Eastern District Board member in 1982 and reelected in 1985 and 1988, for Shau Kei Wan. He was appointed as the Legislative Council in 1983. In 1988 election, he defeated the incumbent Desmond Lee Yu-tai from the East Island electoral college constituency consisting of members of the Eastern and Wan Chai District Board by the margin of one vote. When the direct election was introduced in 1991, he lost his seat to the pro-democracy activists Martin Lee and Man Sai-cheong of the United Democrats of Hong Kong.
