= Desmond Lee (Hong Kong politician) =

Hong Kong politician

Desmond Lee Yu-tai
- 李汝大

Member of the Legislative Council
- In office 30 October 1985 – 25 August 1988
- Succeeded by: Chan Ying-lun
- Constituency: East Island

Personal details
- Born: 25 October 1944 (age 81) Guangzhou, Guangdong
- Party: Civic Association (1980s–90s); Progressive Hong Kong Society (1980s); Association for Democracy and People's Livelihood (1980s); United Democrats (1990–91); The Frontier (1990s–2000s); Liberal (2014–present)
- Spouse: Denise Lee
- Children: 1 daughter, 2 sons
- Education: Chinese University of Hong Kong (BA, MA)

Desmond Lee Yu-tai (born 25 October 1944) is a retired Hong Kong politician, a member of Eastern District Council for most of a 30-year period and a former member of the Legislative Council of Hong Kong.

Lee was born in Guangzhou. He was first elected to the Eastern District Board in 1985. In the same year when the indirect election for the Legislative Council was first introduced, he was elected to the council through the East Island electoral college consisting of members of the Eastern and Wan Chai District Board. He ran for re-election in 1988 but was defeated by Chan Ying-lun.

He joined the United Democrats of Hong Kong, the first major pro-democratic party in 1990 but quit in 1991.

He represented the Tanner constituency in the Eastern District until standing down in 2015.
