= Poon Chi-fai =

Poon Chi-fai JP
- 潘志輝

Member of the Legislative Council
- In office 30 October 1985 – 22 August 1991
- Constituency: Kwun Tong

Personal details
- Born: 6 December 1951 (age 74) Hong Kong
- Party: Progressive Hong Kong Society (1980s)
- Education: North Carolina A&T State University (BSc), Virginia Polytechnic Institute & State University (MURP)
- Occupation: Public Relations Consultant

Poon Chi-fai, JP (born 6 December 1951, Hong Kong) was the member of the Legislative Council of Hong Kong and Kwun Tong District Board.

Poon was born and raised in Hong Kong. He studied economics at the North Carolina A&T State University before he returned and worked in Hong Kong in 1978. He had worked for the Kowloon Motor Bus Ltd. as public relations consultant. He began to participate in community services in 1979 by working in the area committees in Kwun Tong district. He was subsequently appointed to the Kwun Tong District Board in 1985 and elected to the Legislative Council in the first indirect election in 1985 through Kwun Tong electoral college constituency consisting of members of the Kwun Tong District Board and reelected in 1988.

He had served on the Standing Commission on Civil Service Salaries and Conditions of Service and the Citizen Advisory Committee on Community Relations of the Independent Commission Against Corruption (ICAC).

He ran for re-election in the first direct election 1991 but was defeated by the pro-democracy activists Szeto Wah and Fred Li of the United Democrats of Hong Kong and Meeting Point alliance.
