= Kingsley Sit =

Hong Kong politician (born 1949)

Kingsley Sit Ho-yin
- 薛浩然

Member of the Legislative Council
- In office 12 October 1988 – 22 August 1991
- Preceded by: Jackie Chan
- Constituency: South Kowloon

Personal details
- Born: 1949 (age 76–77) Hong Kong
- Party: Progressive Hong Kong Society (1980s)
- Occupation: surveyor, loss adjuster, company director

Kingsley Sit Ho-yin (born 1949, Hong Kong) was the member of the Legislative Council of Hong Kong.

Sit first attempted in the 1985 Legislative Council election, the first election of the colony's legislature in the New Territories West electoral college consisting of members of the Tuen Mun and Yuen Long District Board but was lost to Tai Chin-wah. In the 1988 Legislative Council election, he successfully gained a seat in the South Kowloon electoral college.

In June 1991, Sit put forward a motion to urge the government to resume the carrying out of the death penalty immediately. The death penalty in Hong Kong was mandatory sentence for murder, however no executive had been carried out since 1967. The motion was defeated and Martin Lee's amended motion of abolishing the death penalty was passed. The death penalty was repealed in 1993.

Kingsley Sit strongly opposed the decriminalisation of homosexuality. In the council meeting on 10 July 1991, he stated that "decriminalization, of homosexuality is contrary to the moral standards of the traditional Chinese society."

Sit was defeated in the elections to the Legislative Council in September 1991 general election, 1991 by-election in December 1995 and 1996 election within the Selection Committee for the Provisional Legislative Council.

After the handover of Hong Kong, he was elected to the 800-member Election Committee which is responsible for electing the Chief Executive of Hong Kong in 2005 and 2006 through Heung Yee Kuk.

The powerful Heung Yee Kuk chairman Lau Wong-fat is the brother of Kingsley Sit's wife.

Legislative Council of Hong Kong
Preceded by Jackie Chan	Member of the Legislative Council; Representative for South Kowloon; 1988–1991	Succeeded by Frederick Fung; James To as Representatives of Kowloon West
