= Gordon MacWhinnie =

Sir Gordon Menzies MacWhinnie
- Born: November 12, 1922; Tramore, Ireland
- Died: July 18, 2007 (aged 84)
- Education: Westminster School
- Occupations: Accountant, business leader
- Known for: Founding the Hong Kong Society of Accountants; father of modern accountancy in Hong Kong
- Title: First President of the Hong Kong Society of Accountants (1973–1974)
- Spouse: Marjorie (m. 1948)
- Children: Ian, Antony; grandchildren: four granddaughters
- Awards: Officer of the Order of the British Empire (1977); Commander of the Order of the British Empire (1984); Knighted (1992)

Sir Gordon Menzies Macwhinnie CBE JP (12 November 1922 – 18 July 2007) was a key figure in Hong Kong before its return to the People's Republic of China.

Macwhinnie founded the Hong Kong Society of Accountants, serving as its president from 1973 to 1974, which earned him the unofficial title father of modern accountancy in Hong Kong. He was chairman of several companies, a member of government committees and the driving force behind the Hong Kong University of Science and Technology.

== Early years ==
Macwhinnie was born in Tramore, Ireland, his father having relocated from Scotland. His father started work as a stockbroker in London and the family moved again, this time to Chipstead, Surrey. He was educated at the Westminster School.

== World War II ==
During World War II, Macwhinnie served as a captain with Number 1 Commando with 3 Commando Brigade in Burma and the Far East. In January 1945, during the third Arakan campaign, the whole brigade was landed at Kangaw, opposite the point of the Myebon peninsula.

The Japanese were ready and the commandos' fighting skills and determination were stretched to the maximum in order to hold Hill 170 until the arrival of the leading brigade of the 25th Indian Division. There was bitter hand-to-hand fighting. At the end of the war Macwhinnie was posted to Hong Kong and put in charge of Stanley prison, which had actually housed Japanese officers.

== Career ==
After he was demobbed he undertook articles with Peat Marwick Mitchell. He had been impressed by Hong Kong during his brief army service there and was delighted when he was sent by Peat Marwick back to the territory in 1950 to join its branch there. He became a senior partner in 1968 and retired from the company, now called KPMG, in 1978. During those ten years he served on a number of government committees, mostly concerning business practice and ethics.

In 1973, he began founding the Hong Kong Society of Accountants (HKSA) to counter the severe shortage of accountants. He introduced the territory's own system of certification so that local people could become chartered accountants. Prior to this only chartered accountants from the United Kingdom and Australia worked in accountancy in Hong Kong. He was the first president of the HKSA, which started with a membership of 566, and is now known as the Hong Kong Institute of Certified Public Accountants, boasting more than 25,000 members.

After his retirement in 1978, Macwhinnie, who had been a member of the Royal Hong Kong Jockey Club since he arrived in the territory and was elected a steward in 1974, became chairman, serving from 1989 to 1991.

== Death ==
Macwhinnie died in 2007, aged 84, from undisclosed causes. He is survived by his wife, Marjorie, whom he married in 1948, their two sons Ian and Antony, his four granddaughters.

== Honours ==
Macwhinnie was appointed Officer of the Order of the British Empire in 1977, and Commander of the Order of the British Empire in 1984. He was knighted in 1992.

Sporting positions
Preceded by Sir Oswald Cheung	Chairman of the Royal Hong Kong Jockey Club; 1989–1991	Succeeded by Sir William Purves
