= Richard Lai =

Richard Lai Sung-lung MBE, JP
- 雷聲隆

Member of the Legislative Council
- In office 30 October 1985 – 25 August 1988
- Constituency: South New Territories
- Succeeded by: Daniel Lam

Personal details
- Born: 4 August 1946 Shanghai
- Died: 27 March 2008 (aged 61) Shanghai
- Party: Association for Democracy and People's Livelihood (1980s); United Democrats of Hong Kong (1990–91)
- Education: Bolton Institute of Technology; Leeds University (PhD)
- Occupation: Director

Richard Lai Sung-lung, (4 August 1946 – 27 March 2008) was a former member of the Legislative Council of Hong Kong.

Lai was born in Shanghai in a family doing jewellery and property business before he moved to Hong Kong in 1950. He studied textile industries at the Bolton Institute of Technology and Leeds University and worked as the director in textile companies.

He was also the fellow of the Institution of Works Manager, Textile Institute, Institution of Industrial Managers and British Institute of Management. He served as the vice-chairman of the Hong Kong Productivity Council.

He was appointed to the Tsuen Wan District Board and elected to the Legislative Council in the indirect election in 1985 through South New Territories electoral college constituency consisting of members of the Tsuen Wan and Sai Kung District Board. He failed to be reelected in 1988.

He joined the United Democrats of Hong Kong, the first major pro-democratic party in 1990 but quit in 1991.
