= Liu Lit-for =

Liu Lit-for MBE, JP
- 廖烈科

Deputy of Hong Kong to the 9th NPC
- In office 8 December 1997 – 29 January 1998

Member of the Legislative Council
- In office 30 October 1985 – 25 August 1988
- Succeeded by: So Chau Yim-ping
- Constituency: West Island

Personal details
- Born: 21 September 1930 Republic of China
- Died: 29 January 1998 (aged 67) Phuket, Thailand
- Party: Progressive Hong Kong Society (1980s)
- Education: Kwangtung Provincial College of Arts and Sciences
- Occupation: Banker

Liu Lit-for, MBE, JP (Chinese: 廖烈科; 21 September 1930 – 21 September 1998) was the executive director of Liu Chong Hing Bank and member of the Legislative Council of Hong Kong.

Liu was the second son of Liu Po-shan, the founder of the Liu Chong Hing Bank. He was born and studied in mainland China before moving to Hong Kong.

He was appointed to the Central and Western District Board and elected to the Legislative Council in the indirect election in 1985 through West Island electoral college constituency consisting of members of the Central and Western and Southern District Board. He failed to be reelected in 1988.

He was elected as the Hong Kong deputy to the National People's Congress of the People's Republic of China in December 1997, but soon died of a heart attack during a trip to Phuket in 1998.
