= Conrad Lam =

Hong Kong politician

Conrad Lam Kui-shing
- 林鉅成

Member of the Legislative Council
- In office 30 October 1985 – 25 August 1988
- Succeeded by: Michael Cheng
- Constituency: Wong Tai Sin
- In office 9 October 1991 – 31 July 1995
- Constituency: Kowloon Central

Personal details
- Born: November 24, 1935 (age 90) Hong Kong
- Party: United Democrats of Hong Kong
- Occupation: Medical Practitioner

Conrad Lam Kui-shing (born 24 November 1935) is a former founding member of the United Democrats of Hong Kong. He was a member of the Legislative Council from 1985 to 1988 and 1991 to 1995 and Wong Tai Sin District Board member.

Legislative Council of Hong Kong
New constituency	Member of Legislative Council; Representative for Wong Tai Sin; 1985–1988	Succeeded by Michael Cheng
New constituency	Member of Legislative Council; Representative for Kowloon Central; 1991–1995; Served alongside: Lau Chin-shek	Succeeded by Bruce Liu as Representative for Kowloon Central
