= Kowloon East =

Red indicates extent of Kowloon East, combining Kowloon Central and Kowloon East constituencies established in 2021

Kowloon East is the eastern part of Kowloon, covering the Wong Tai Sin and Kwun Tong District, with Kowloon City District occasionally included.

== History ==
The boundary of Kowloon East is not strictly defined and hence varies. While traditionally the Kowloon–Canton Railway (now the East Rail line) serves as the separation of eastern and western part, the Kowloon City District, located at the east of the railway, was part of the Kowloon West Legislative Council constituency in order to balance the population between the two halves. Nevertheless, the Kwun Tong District has long been regarded as the part of Kowloon East, while Wong Tai Sin District is sometimes seen as either in Kowloon Central or Kowloon East. Naming of Kowloon East can be seen in the planned East Kowloon line which connects Diamond Hill to Sheung Wan via East Kowloon neighbourhoods, and East Kowloon Corridor which links Kai Tak to Hung Hom.

In 1985, "Kowloon City", "Kwun Tong" and "Wong Tai Sin" electoral-college constituencies were created, composing of the members of the District Boards of Kowloon City District, Kwun Tong and Wong Tai Sin and corresponding members of the Urban Council for the first ever Legislative Council election. The electoral colleges lasted for two terms until they were replaced by the geographical constituencies in 1991 when the first direct election to the Legislative Council were introduced.

In the 1991 election, the region was divided into two constituency, "Kowloon East" consisting of the Kwun Tong District and "Kowloon Central" consisting of Wong Tai Sin and Kowloon City Districts, each returning two members to the Legislative Council using the two-seat constituency two vote system. All four seats were won by the United Democrats of Hong Kong (UDHK) in an electoral landslide. A by-election was held for Kowloon Central constituency after Lau Chin-shek resigned.

The electoral system was overhauled after one term, replaced by the single-constituency single-vote system in the 1995 Legislative Council election, with four new constituencies, with four new constituencies known as "Kowloon East", "Kowloon South-east", "Kowloon North-east" and "Kowloon Central" being created. The pro-democrats again won all of the seats, with ADPL's Bruce Liu defeated pro-Beijing Democratic Alliance for the Betterment of Hong Kong (DAB) chairman Jasper Tsang in Kowloon Central. except Kowloon North-east which elected veteran pro-Beijing trade unionist Chan Yuen-han of the Democratic Alliance for the Betterment of Hong Kong (DAB).

Following the handover in 1997, the "Kowloon East" replaced the colonial constituencies, with Kowloon City District redistributed into the Kowloon West constituency. It remained in place until 2021 under the change of electoral system, "Kowloon East" and "Kowloon Central" were installed as the new constituencies, with the former one covering the Kwun Tong District and south-eastern Wong Tai Sin District while the latter one consisted of Kowloon City and most of Wong Tai Sin District.

== Evolution ==
Years \ Districts	Kwun Tong		Wong Tai Sin		Kowloon City	
Years \ Districts	(NW part)	(SE part)	(SE part)	(NW part)	(Northern part)	(Southern part)
1985–91	Kwun Tong		Wong Tai Sin		Kowloon City	
1991–95	Kowloon East		Kowloon Central			
1995–97	Kowloon; East	Kowloon; South-east	Kowloon; North-east	Kowloon Central		Kowloon; South
1998–2021	Kowloon East				Part of Kowloon West	
2021–	Kowloon East			Kowloon Central		
