= Henrietta Ip =

Henrietta Ip Man-hing OBE, JP
- 葉文慶

Member of the Legislative Council
- In office 6 October 1982 – 22 August 1991
- Appointed by: Sir Edward Youde; Sir David Wilson

Personal details
- Born: 7 December 1947 (age 78) Hong Kong
- Education: Maryknoll Convent School; University of Liverpool; Royal College of Physicians
- Occupation: Paediatrician

Henrietta Ip Man-hing, OBE, JP (born 7 December 1947, Hong Kong) is a paediatrician and politician.

Graduated from Maryknoll Convent School, she obtained a M.B.Ch.B. from the University of Liverpool. She is member of the Royal College of Surgeons of England and fellow of the Royal College of Physicians of Edinburgh and Glasgow.

Ip was appointed to the Legislative Council of Hong Kong by Governor Edward Youde in 1982, and served in the council until 1991.

Ip was the member of the Hong Kong Basic Law Consultative Committee to draft the Basic Law of Hong Kong in the 1980s. She and other businessmen, financiers and industrialists set up the Business and Professionals group, which later transformed into Group of 89 to put forward a conservative proposal for electing the Chief Executive of Hong Kong after 1997.

After the Tiananmen Square crackdown in 1989, Ip urged the UK Parliament to grant full British citizenship to Hong Kong's British nationals in the council meeting held on 5 July 1989, saying that "we were born and live under British rule on British land.... It is therefore... our right to ask that you should give us back a place of abode so that we can continue to live under British rule on British land if we so wish.... I represent most of all those who live here to firmly request and demand you to grant us the right to full British citizenship so that we can, if we so wish, live in the United Kingdom, our Motherland.... In fact, your resistance to granting us full citizenship and the right of abode in the United Kingdom reflects your doubt about the Joint Declaration. Yet the more you lack confidence in it, the stronger is the reason why you should grant us full citizenship to protect us from communist rule... I say to you that the right of abode in the United Kingdom is the best and the only definitive guarantee.... With your failure to give us such a guarantee, reluctant as I may, I must advise the people of Hong Kong, and urgently now, each to seek for themselves a home of last resort even if they have to leave to do so. I do so because, as a legislator, my duty is with the people first and the stability and prosperity of Hong Kong second, although the two are so interdependent on each other...." She was a critic of the idea of the British National (Overseas).
