= Jackie Chan (politician) =

Hong Kong politician

Jackie Chan Chai-keung
- 陳濟強

Member of the Legislative Council
- In office 30 October 1985 – 25 August 1988
- Succeeded by: Kingsley Sit
- Constituency: South Kowloon

Personal details
- Born: 7 November 1938 (age 87) Hong Kong
- Party: Liberal Democratic Federation
- Spouse(s): Siu Choi Chi, Emily K. L. Sung
- Children: 5 (Gary Chan, Eddie Chan, Eliza Chan, Maria Chan, Julia Chan)
- Education: Queen Elizabeth School; University of New South Wales (BEng)
- Occupation: Civil engineer

Jackie Chan Chai-keung (Chinese: 陳濟強; born 7 November 1938) is a former member of the Legislative Council of Hong Kong and Mong Kok District Board (now Yau Tsim Mong District Council).

== Biography ==
Chan was born in Hong Kong in 1938. He graduated from the Queen Elizabeth School and continued his study in civil engineering at the University of New South Wales in Australia. He is the member of the Institution of Civil Engineers in England, Institution of Engineers in Australia and Hong Kong Institution of Engineers. He set up his own firm, Chan Chai Keung Architect & Engineer Co.

He was first elected to the Mong Kok District Board in the first District Board election in 1982 and served in the board until it being merged into the Yau Ma Tei District Board in the 1994 election where he failed to retain his seat in Mong Kok South to Chow Chun-fai by 688 to 1,218 votes.

He won a seat in the first Legislative Council indirect election from the South Kowloon electoral college consisting of members of the Mong Kok and Yau Ma Tei District Board. He was against the government's White Paper: The Development of Representative Government: The Way Forward which concludes that direct elections to the Legislative Council would not be carried out in 1988 "betrays and intentionally misrepresents the wish of the majority of Hong Kong residents".

Legislative Council of Hong Kong
New constituency	Member of the Legislative Council; Representative for South Kowloon; 1985–1988	Succeeded by Kingsley Sit
