= Kowloon West (1991 constituency) =

- Former Geographical constituency for the Legislative Council of Hong Kong
- Boundary of Kowloon West in Hong Kong
- District: Yau Tsim District; Mong Kok District; Sham Shui Po District
- Region: Kowloon
- Electorate: 213,345

Former constituency
- Created: 1991
- Abolished: 1995
- Number of members: Two
- Replaced by: Kowloon West; Kowloon South-west

Kowloon West was a geographical constituencies in the election for the Legislative Council of Hong Kong in 1991, which elects two members of the Legislative Council using the dual-seat constituency dual vote system. The constituency covers Yau Tsim District, Mong Kok District, and Sham Shui Po District in Kowloon.

The constituency was divided and replaced by the Kowloon West and Kowloon South-west constituencies in 1995.

== Returned members ==
Elected members are as follows:

Election	Member	Party	Member	Party
1991	Frederick Fung	ADPL	James To	UDHK
1994	Frederick Fung	ADPL	James To	Democratic

== Election results ==
1991 Legislative Council election: Kowloon West
Party	Candidate	Votes	%	±%
ADPL	Frederick Fung Kin-kee	36,508	28.93	
United Democrats	James To Kun-sun	26,352	20.88	
Civic	Desmond Lee Yu-tai	21,471	17.01	
Independent	Kingsley Sit Ho-yin	18,634	14.76	
ADPL	Law Cheung-kwok	17,145	13.58	
LDF	Ng Kin-sun	6,098	4.83	
Turnout		69,483	32.57	
Registered electors		213,345		
ADPL win (new seat)				
United Democrats win (new seat)				
