= Chung Pui-lam =

Hong Kong politician (1940–2025)

Chung Pui-lam GBS, SBS, OBE, JP
- 鍾沛林

Member of the Legislative Council
- In office 30 October 1985 – 22 August 1991
- Constituency: Sham Shui Po

Personal details
- Born: 11 October 1940 British Hong Kong
- Died: 3 July 2025 (aged 84)
- Party: Progressive Hong Kong Society (1985–90); Liberal Democratic Federation (1990–97); Progressive Alliance (after 1997)
- Spouse: Maxine Lee Sau-king
- Children: 3
- Education: University of London (LLB), University of Hong Kong (P.C.LL.)
- Occupation: Solicitor

Chung Pui-lam, GBS, SBS, OBE, JP (11 October 1940 – 3 July 2025) was a Hong Kong politician who was a member of the Legislative Council of Hong Kong and Sham Shui Po District Board.

== Life and career ==
Chung became a Hong Kong government civil servant as his early career and later on studied law at the University of London and University of Hong Kong. He set up the Chung & Kwan Solicitors law firm, after he left the legal department in the Hong Kong government in 1979.

He was first elected as the Sham Shui Po District Board member in 1985 in the Lai Wan constituency based in the Mei Foo Sun Chuen and reelected in 1988. He was elected in the first Legislative Council indirect election from the Sham Shui Po electoral college constituency consisting of members of the Eastern and Sham Shui Po District Board and served until 1991.

In the Legislative Council meeting held on 27 June 1990 on the debate of the Hong Kong Bill of Rights Ordinance, Chung conceded the equality between men and women was a basic human right but thought that to extend the right to the New Territories women to inherit land the same as men would lead to social disorder and the instability of Hong Kong.

Chung died on 3 July 2025, at the age of 84.
