= Hong Kong Island (constituency) =

Hong Kong Island's location within Hong Kong

Hong Kong Island was divided into one or more constituencies of the Legislative Council following the first-ever election in 1985.

== History ==
In 1985, "East Island" and "West Island" electoral-college constituencies were created. East Island consisted of the Eastern District and the Wan Chai District, while West Island consisted of the Central and Western District and the Southern District. The electoral colleges lasted for two terms until they were replaced by the geographical constituencies in 1991 when the first direct election to the Legislative Council was introduced.

Hong Kong Island was then divided into "Hong Kong Island East" and "Hong Kong Island West" with the same boundaries, each returning two members to the Legislative Council using the two-seat-constituency two-votes system. All four seats were won by the United Democrats of Hong Kong (UDHK) in the pro-democracy electoral landslide. The electoral system was overhauled after one term, replaced by the single-constituency single-vote system in the 1995 Legislative Council election with four new constituencies, namely "Hong Kong Island Central", "Hong Kong Island East", "Hong Kong Island South" and "Hong Kong Island West". All four seats were again won by the pro-democrats, three of them taken by the Democratic Party and one by independent Christine Loh.

Following the handover in 1997, all constituencies on Hong Kong Island were merged into one, the "Hong Kong Island" constituency. It remained in place until 2021 under the change of the electoral system. "Hong Kong Island East" and "Hong Kong Island West", which included the Islands District for the first time, were installed as the new constituencies.

== Evolution ==
Years \ Districts	Southern		Central and Western	Wan Chai	Eastern		
Years \ Districts	Eastern part	Western part	Central and Western	Wan Chai	Western part	Central part	Eastern part
1985–1991	Western Island			East Island			
1991–1995	Hong Kong Island West			Hong Kong Island East			
1995–1997	Hong Kong Island South	Hong Kong Island West		Hong Kong Island Central		Hong Kong Island East	Hong Kong Island South
1998–2021	Hong Kong Island						
2021–present	Hong Kong Island West			Hong Kong Island East			
