= Daniel Tse =

Macau university president

Daniel Tse Chi-wai GBS, CBE, JP
- 謝志偉

Chair of the University Council of the University of Macau
- Incumbent
- Assumed office 2001

Chairman of the Hong Kong Baptist University
- In office 1994–2001
- Succeeded by: Ng Ching-fai

Chairman of the Hong Kong Baptist College
- In office 1971–1994
- Preceded by: Lam Chi-fung

Member of the Executive Council
- In office 1 September 1986 – 31 October 1991
- Appointed by: Sir Edward Youde
- Succeeded by: Edward Ho

Member of the Legislative Council
- In office 30 October 1985 – 20 August 1991
- Constituency: Kowloon City

Personal details
- Born: 1934 (age 91–92) Macau
- Education: Baylor University (MSc, LLD), University of Pittsburgh (PhD)
- Occupation: University president

Daniel Tse Chi-wai, GBS, CBE, JP (born 1934 in Macau) is the chair of the University Council of the University of Macau. He was also the member of the Executive Council and Legislative Council of Hong Kong.

== Biography ==
Tse was born and brought up in Macau. He obtained bachelor's degree in Mathematics and master's degree in Physics at the Baylor University, and obtained doctoral degree at the University of Pittsburgh. He became the President of the Hong Kong Baptist College in 1971 and led it to gain the full university status in 1994. He retired from the Hong Kong Baptist University in 2001.

He was appointed to the Kowloon City District Board and elected to the Legislative Council of Hong Kong in 1985 through an electoral college consisting of members of the Kowloon City District Board in the first Legislative Council election, in which he served until 1991. In 1986, he and Chiu Hin-kwong was appointed by Governor Edward Youde to the Executive Council.

During the transition period of the transfer of sovereignty over Hong Kong, he was appointed as a Hong Kong Affairs Advisor to the People's Republic of China and a member of the Hong Kong Basic Law Consultative Committee, and became a member of the Preparatory Committee for the Hong Kong Special Administrative Region. Daniel Tse was also the member of the ninth and tenth National Committee of the Chinese People's Political Consultative Conference from 1998 to 2008.

After retirement from the Baptist University, he was invited by the former Chief Executive of Macao to serve as the chair of the University Council of the University of Macau. He was appointed Director of the Research Centre for Sustainable Development Strategies of the Government of the Macao SAR from 2005 to 2010.

Due to his contributions to higher education and his public services to Hong Kong, Daniel Tse was appointed Justice of the Peace (JP) in 1977. He was awarded the O.B.E. (Officer of the Most Excellence Order of the British Empire) Title in 1986, and then the C.B.E. (Commander of the Most Excellent Order of the British Empire) Title in 1991. He was the recipient of the Gold Bauhinia Star (GBS) of the HKSAR in 1998 for his contributions to the formation of the SAR Government. For his contributions to international higher education, Dr. Tse was awarded nine honorary doctoral degrees and three honorary professorships from various universities in Europe, the US, Australia, Hong Kong and mainland China.
