= Tai Chin-wah =

Hong Kong politician

Tai Chin-wah 戴展華

Member of the Legislative Council
- In office 30 October 1985 – 22 August 1991
- Succeeded by: Zachary Wong
- Constituency: New Territories West

Personal details
- Born: 24 August 1952 (age 74) Hong Kong
- Party: Federation for the Stability of Hong Kong
- Education: University of Manchester
- Occupation: Solicitor

Tai Chin-wah (born 24 August 1952, in Hong Kong) was a New Territories Justice of Peace until 1992, practicing solicitor member of the Legislative Council of Hong Kong (1985–91) for the New Territories West electoral college and Yuen Long District Board member. Due to his falsified qualifications, Tai has been disbarred from practicing law in Hong Kong.

== Falsified legal qualifications ==
In March 1992 it was discovered that Tai had not passed his professional examination in England and had forged credentials to enable him to practice as a solicitor since 1983. He resigned from his elected seat in the Legislative Council the next day. In mitigation the defense lawyer said that Tai committed the crime to please his strict father who suffered from heart palpitations. Affidavits testifying to Tai's good character were given from dominant public figures such as senior Executive Councillor Lady Dunn, former chief secretary Sir David Akers-Jones, and some other legislators. As result, Tai was given a six-month jail sentence, suspended for one year. Bitter discontent was aroused from the community against the light punishment which forced the Legal Department to appeal against sentence.

Grown up in an influential New Territories rural family, his uncle Tai Kuen was the chairman of the Yuen Long District Board for decades.
