= Progressive Hong Kong Society =

Progressive Hong Kong Society 香港勵進會
- Chairperson: Maria Tam
- Founded: 14 February 1985
- Dissolved: 6 November 1990
- Merged into: Liberal Democratic Federation of Hong Kong
- Ideology: Conservatism (HK)

The Progressive Hong Kong Society (Chinese: 香港勵進會; PHKS) was a political group in Hong Kong. It was established on 14 February 1985 by the then Executive and Legislative Council member Maria Tam. The party is considered conservative and pro-Beijing, in contrast to the pro-democracy forces which rose to prominence in the late 1980s and early 90s.

The society's stated mission was to support the implementation of the Sino-British Joint Declaration and maintain Hong Kong's prosperity and stability. It was merged into the Liberal Democratic Federation of Hong Kong in 1990. Notable members of the group included pro-Beijing businessmen and politicians James Tien and Vincent Lo, and future Chief Executive Leung Chun-ying.

== History ==
It was established on 14 February 1985 after the Sino-British Joint Declaration was signed and the colonial government began democratic reform. Headed by the then Executive and Legislative Councillor Maria Tam Wai-chu and co-founded by Pao Ping-wing, Philip Kwok Chi-kuen and Lester Kwok Chi-hang, the society was formed as a cross-sector political force consisting of business and professional representatives. The aims of the society were to support the implementation of the Joint Declaration and maintain the stability and prosperity of the Hong Kong society before and after 1997.

The society held its first congress on 29 June 1985. Provisional chairman Maria Tam was elected as the first chairman, Philip Kwok the vice-chairman, Pao Ping-wing the secretary, and Lester Kwok the treasurer. Executive committee members included Veronica Wu, Kan Fook-yee, Tung Chee-ping, Lee Jung-kong, Lee Kai-ming, Addy Wong and Raymond Wu. At that time they had a total of 131 members, including two members of the Hong Kong Basic Law Drafting Committee, one member of the Chinese People's Political Consultative Conference (CPPCC), 41 District Board members, 8 members from the Urban Council and the Provisional Regional Council, one member of the Executive Council, two members of the Legislative Council, four members from the Heung Yee Kuk, three members of the rural committees and 17 trade unionists. It formed a close partnership with the Hong Kong Civic Association, one of the oldest political organisations in the colony.

The society received substantial grassroots support and was campaigned actively in elections against pro-democracy forces. In the 1988 District Board elections, the society fielded 49 candidates, the highest among political groups, and 41 of them were elected. Another 11 members were appointed to the District Boards subsequently. In the April 1988 congress, Tam was re-elected as chairman while Lester Kwok, Chung Pui-lam and Yeung Fuk-kwong were elected vice-chairmen and George Pang Chun-sing elected as treasurer. Other new executive committee members included Leung Chun-ying, Edward Ho, Lee Yiu-kwong, Kwan Yiu-wing and Peter Wong Man-kong.

In the 1988 Legislative Council election, the society won eight seats in the electoral colleges and functional constituencies.

In 1990, Maria Tam co-founded the Liberal Democratic Federation of Hong Kong, a conservative political party. Many society members joined the new federation. Tam and Philip Kwok became the vice-chairmen in the new party.

== Notable members ==
- Dennis Bray
- Jackie Chan
- Chan Pun
- Edward Chen
- Cheung Yan-lung
- Chung Pui-lam
- Gerry Forsgate
- Kenneth Fung
- Victor Fung
- Edward Ho
- Kan Fook-yee
- Lester Kwok
- Philip Kwok
- Lam Chak-piu
- Jung Kong Lee
- Lee Kai-ming
- Leung Chun-ying
- Li Fung-ying
- Liu Lit-for
- Vincent Lo
- Ng Kin-sun
- Pao Ping-wing
- Poon Chi-fai
- Walter M. Sulke
- Maria Tam
- Tong Kam-piu
- Peter Wong Man-kong
- Wong Wai-hung
- Raymond Wu
- Veronica Wu
- Yeung Fuk-kwong
- Howard Young

== See also ==
- Politics of Hong Kong
- List of political parties in Hong Kong
