= Opinion polling for the 2012 Hong Kong legislative election =

This article presents detailed opinion polling for the 2012 Hong Kong legislative election.

== Overall poll results ==
Overall poll results each party in geographical constituencies according to each constituency.

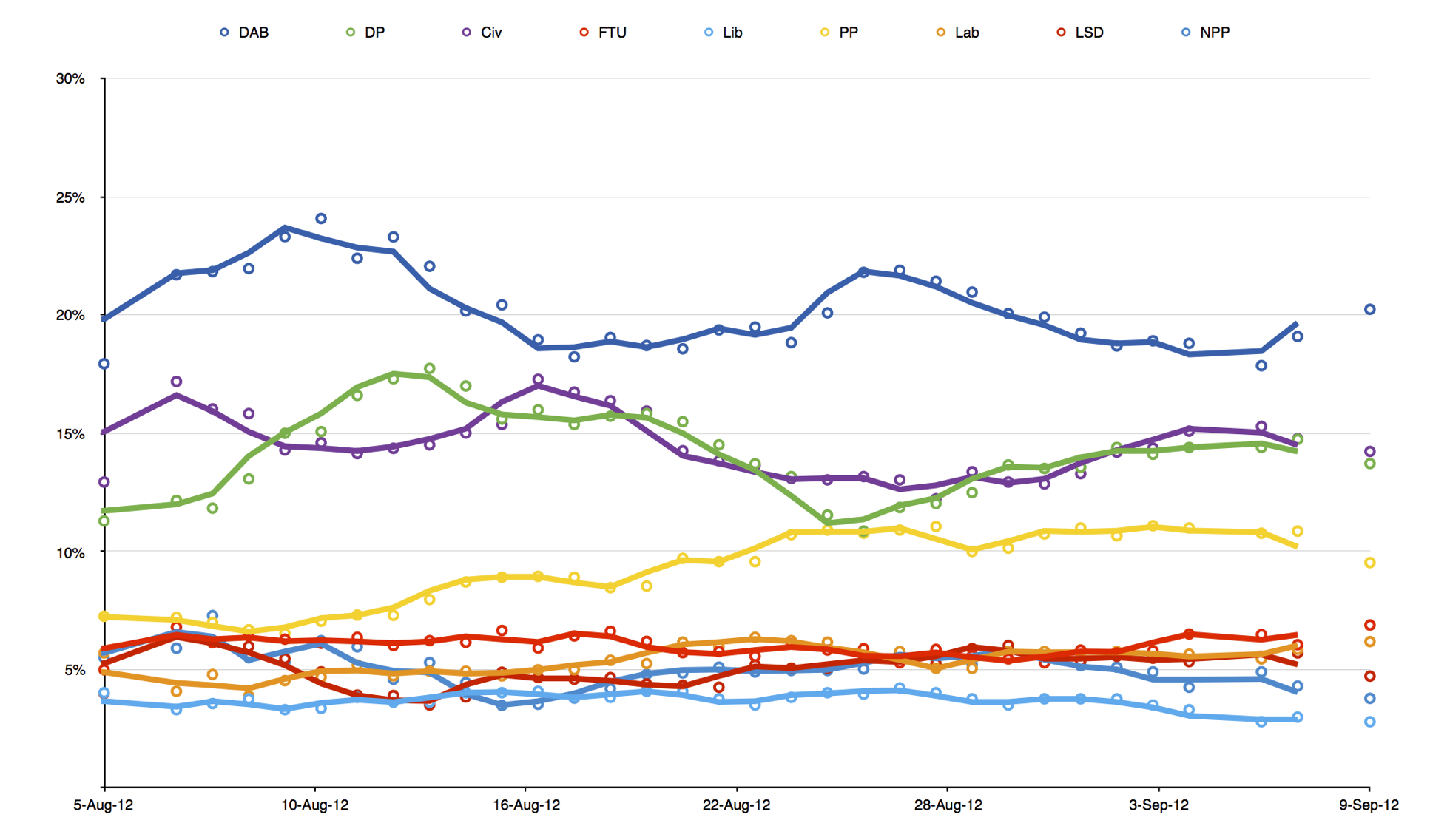
DAB Democratic Civic FTU Liberal People Power Labour LSD NPP

Poll source	Sample size	Dates administered	DAB	DP	CP	LSD	FTU	LP	Lab	PP	NPP	Others	Lead
Election result		9 Sep 2012	20.2%	13.7%	14.1%	4.9%	7.1%	2.7%	6.2%	9.7%	3.8%	17.6%	6.1%
Cable TV/HKUPOP	3,457	3–7 Sep 2012	20%	15%	15%	6%	6%	3%	6%	11%	4%	18%	5%
now TV/HKUPOP	1,992	3–7 Sep 2012	19%	15%	15%	6%	6%	3%	6%	11%	4%	16%	4%
now TV/HKUPOP	1,888	2–6 Sep 2012	18%	14%	15%	6%	6%	3%	5%	11%	5%	16%	3%
Cable TV/HKUPOP	3,241	2–6 Sep 2012	18%	14%	15%	6%	6%	3%	6%	11%	4%	17%	3%
Cable TV/HKUPOP	3,182	1–5 Sep 2012	18%	14%	16%	5%	7%	3%	6%	11%	4%	16%	2%
now TV/HKUPOP	1,851	31 Aug–4 Sep 2012	18%	14%	16%	5%	7%	3%	6%	11%	4%	16%	2%
Cable TV/HKUPOP	3,122	31 Aug–4 Sep 2012	19%	15%	15%	5%	6%	3%	6%	11%	4%	17%	4%
Cable TV/HKUPOP	3,070	30 Aug–3 Sep 2012	18%	14%	14%	6%	6%	3%	6%	11%	5%	18%	4%
now TV/HKUPOP	1,836	30 Aug–3 Sep 2012	19%	14%	14%	5%	6%	4%	6%	11%	5%	16%	5%
now TV/HKUPOP	1,730	29 Aug–2 Sep 2012	19%	14%	14%	6%	6%	4%	6%	11%	5%	16%	5%
Cable TV/HKUPOP	2,920	29 Aug–2 Sep 2012	19%	14%	14%	6%	6%	4%	6%	11%	5%	16%	5%
Cable TV/HKUPOP	2,828	28 Aug–1 Sep 2012	20%	14%	14%	6%	6%	4%	6%	11%	5%	15%	6%
now TV/HKUPOP	1,665	28 Aug–1 Sep 2012	19%	14%	13%	5%	6%	4%	6%	11%	5%	17%	5%
now TV/HKUPOP	1,598	27–31 Aug 2012	20%	14%	13%	6%	5%	4%	6%	11%	6%	17%	6%
Cable TV/HKUPOP	2,735	27–31 Aug 2012	20%	13%	13%	6%	6%	4%	6%	11%	6%	14%	6%
Cable TV/HKUPOP	2,536	26–30 Aug 2012	21%	14%	13%	6%	5%	4%	6%	10%	6%	15%	7%
now TV/HKUPOP	1,495	26–30 Aug 2012	20%	14%	13%	6%	5%	4%	6%	10%	6%	16%	6%
now TV/HKUPOP	1,379	25–29 Aug 2012	21%	12%	13%	6%	6%	4%	5%	10%	5%	18%	8%
Cable TV/HKUPOP	2,334	25–29 Aug 2012	21%	13%	13%	6%	5%	4%	5%	10%	5%	17%	8%
Cable TV/HKUPOP	2,225	24–28 Aug 2012	22%	12%	13%	5%	5%	4%	5%	11%	6%	16%	9%
now TV/HKUPOP	1,311	24–28 Aug 2012	21%	12%	12%	5%	6%	4%	5%	11%	6%	17%	9%
now TV/HKUPOP	1,239	23–27 Aug 2012	22%	12%	13%	5%	5%	4%	6%	11%	6%	16%	9%
Cable TV/HKUPOP	2,144	23–27 Aug 2012	21%	12%	13%	5%	5%	4%	6%	11%	6%	17%	8%
Cable TV/HKUPOP	2,044	22–26 Aug 2012	22%	11%	13%	5%	6%	4%	6%	10%	5%	17%	9%
now TV/HKUPOP	1,184	22–26 Aug 2012	22%	11%	13%	5%	6%	4%	6%	11%	5%	17%	9%
now TV/HKUPOP	1,187	21–25 Aug 2012	20%	12%	13%	5%	6%	4%	6%	11%	5%	18%	7%
Cable TV/HKUPOP	2,061	21–25 Aug 2012	21%	11%	13%	5%	6%	4%	6%	11%	5%	17%	8%
Cable TV/HKUPOP	2,024	20–24 Aug 2012	19%	13%	14%	5%	6%	3%	6%	10%	5%	18%	5%
now TV/HKUPOP	1,197	20–24 Aug 2012	19%	13%	13%	5%	6%	4%	6%	11%	5%	18%	6%
now TV/HKUPOP	1,226	19–23 Aug 2012	19%	14%	14%	5%	6%	4%	6%	10%	5%	18%	5%
Cable TV/HKUPOP	1,996	19–23 Aug 2012	20%	13%	14%	5%	6%	4%	7%	10%	5%	17%	6%
Cable TV/HKUPOP	1,939	18–22 Aug 2012	20%	14%	14%	5%	6%	4%	6%	10%	5%	17%	6%
now TV/HKUPOP	1,218	18–22 Aug 2012	19%	15%	14%	4%	6%	4%	6%	10%	5%	18%	5%
now TV/HKUPOP	1,298	17–21 Aug 2012	19%	15%	14%	4%	6%	4%	6%	10%	5%	17%	4%
Cable TV/HKUPOP	1,886	17–21 Aug 2012	18%	15%	15%	4%	6%	4%	6%	9%	5%	17%	3%
Cable TV/HKUPOP	1,666	16–20 Aug 2012	19%	16%	15%	5%	6%	4%	5%	9%	5%	16%	3%
now TV/HKUPOP	1,135	16–20 Aug 2012	19%	16%	16%	4%	6%	4%	5%	9%	5%	16%	3%
now TV/HKUPOP	1,220	15–19 Aug 2012	19%	16%	16%	5%	7%	4%	5%	8%	4%	16%	3%
Cable TV/HKUPOP	1,776	15–19 Aug 2012	19%	16%	16%	4%	6%	4%	6%	8%	4%	17%	3%
Cable TV/HKUPOP	1,670	14–18 Aug 2012	18%	15%	17%	4%	6%	4%	5%	9%	4%	19%	1%
now TV/HKUPOP	1,122	14–18 Aug 2012	18%	15%	17%	4%	6%	4%	5%	9%	4%	19%	1%
now TV/HKUPOP	1,221	13–17 Aug 2012	19%	16%	17%	5%	6%	4%	5%	9%	4%	16%	2%
Cable TV/HKUPOP	1,752	13–17 Aug 2012	19%	15%	17%	4%	6%	4%	5%	9%	4%	17%	2%
Cable TV/HKUPOP	1,669	12–16 Aug 2012	20%	16%	15%	5%	7%	4%	5%	9%	4%	15%	4%
now TV/HKUPOP	1,145	12–16 Aug 2012	20%	16%	15%	5%	7%	4%	5%	9%	3%	16%	4%
now TV/HKUPOP	1,298	11–15 Aug 2012	20%	17%	15%	4%	6%	4%	5%	9%	4%	16%	3%
Cable TV/HKUPOP	1,717	11–15 Aug 2012	21%	17%	15%	4%	7%	4%	5%	9%	5%	13%	4%
Cable TV/HKUPOP	1,558	10–14 Aug 2012	22%	17%	14%	4%	6%	4%	5%	8%	5%	14%	5%
now TV/HKUPOP	1,193	10–14 Aug 2012	22%	18%	15%	4%	6%	4%	5%	8%	5%	14%	4%
now TV/HKUPOP	1,203	9–13 Aug 2012	23%	17%	14%	4%	6%	4%	5%	7%	5%	15%	6%
Cable TV/HKUPOP	1,545	9–13 Aug 2012	23%	18%	14%	4%	6%	3%	5%	7%	5%	15%	5%
Cable TV/HKUPOP	1,477	8–12 Aug 2012	23%	16%	13%	4%	7%	4%	5%	7%	6%	15%	7%
now TV/HKUPOP	1,147	8–12 Aug 2012	22%	17%	14%	4%	6%	4%	5%	7%	6%	14%	5%
now TV/HKUPOP	1,190	7–11 Aug 2012	24%	15%	15%	5%	6%	3%	5%	7%	6%	14%	9%
Cable TV/HKUPOP	1,380	6–10 Aug 2012	24%	14%	14%	6%	7%	3%	5%	9%	5%	14%	10%
now TV/HKUPOP	1,088	6–10 Aug 2012	23%	15%	14%	5%	6%	3%	5%	7%	5%	16%	8%
now TV/HKUPOP	1,115	5–9 Aug 2012	22%	13%	16%	6%	6%	4%	4%	7%	6%	17%	6%
Cable TV/HKUPOP	1,368	5–9 Aug 2012	22%	13%	16%	6%	7%	4%	4%	7%	6%	15%	6%
Cable TV/HKUPOP	Unknown	4–8 Aug 2012	22%	12%	16%	6%	7%	3%	5%	6%	7%	16%	6%
now TV/HKUPOP	Unknown	4–8 Aug 2012	22%	12%	16%	6%	6%	4%	5%	7%	7%	15%	6%
now TV/HKUPOP	Unknown	3–7 Aug 2012	22%	12%	17%	7%	7%	3%	4%	7%	6%	15%	5%
Cable TV/HKUPOP	1,281	3–7 Aug 2012	22%	13%	17%	7%	7%	3%	4%	6%	6%	15%	5%
Cable TV/HKUPOP	3,410	2–6 Aug 2012	21%	13%	16%	5%	7%	4%	5%	7%	6%	15%	5%
Cable TV/HKUPOP	3,023	1–5 Aug 2012	21%	13%	15%	4%	7%	4%	6%	8%	5%	16%	6%
now TV/HKUPOP	5,064	1–5 Aug 2012	18%	11%	13%	4%	5%	4%	6%	7%	6%	26%	5%
HKRA	8,072	12–21 Jul 2012	19%	9%	9%	4%	4%	4%	6%	7%	8%	30%	10%
Last election results	1,524,249	7 Sep 2008	22.9%	20.6%	13.7%	10.1%	5.7%	4.3%	—N/a	—N/a	—N/a	22.7%	2.3%

=== Seat projection ===
Seats gained by each party in geographical constituencies according to the opinion polling.

Poll source	Sample size	Date(s) conducted	DAB	DP	Civ	FTU	Lib	PP	Lab	LSD	NPP	Others	Camp Lead
Election result	1,815,448	9 Sep	9	4	5	3	1	3	3	1	2	4	1
Cable TV/HKUPOP	3,208	3–7 Sep	8	5	5	2	1	5	2	1	2	4	3
now TV/HKUPOP	1,868	3–7 Sep	8	5	5	2	1	5	2	1	2	4	3
now TV/HKUPOP	1,760	2–6 Sep	7	6	5	2	1	5	2	1	2	4	5
Cable TV/HKUPOP	2,935	1–5 Sep	7	6	5	3	1	5	2	1	2	3	5
now TV/HKUPOP	1,713	31 Aug–4 Sep	6	6	6	2	1	5	3	1	2	3	9
Cable TV/HKUPOP	2,821	30 Aug–3 Sep	6	6	6	2	1	5	3	1	2	3	9
now TV/HKUPOP	1,582	29 Aug–2 Sep	6	6	5	3	1	5	3	1	2	3	9
Cable TV/HKUPOP	2,679	29 Aug–2 Sep	7	6	5	2	1	5	3	1	2	3	9
Cable TV/HKUPOP	2,599	28 Aug–1 Sep	7	6	5	2	1	4	3	2	2	3	9
now TV/HKUPOP	1,476	27–31 Aug	7	6	4	3	1	5	3	1	2	3	7
Cable TV/HKUPOP	2,343	26–30 Aug	7	6	5	2	1	4	3	1	2	4	9
now TV/HKUPOP	1,254	25–29 Aug	6	6	4	3	2	5	2	1	2	4	5
Cable TV/HKUPOP	2,042	24–28 Aug	8	4	4	3	1	5	2	1	2	5	3
now TV/HKUPOP	1,143	23–27 Aug	8	4	4	3	1	5	3	1	2	4	3
Cable TV/HKUPOP	1,868	22–26 Aug	8	2	5	2	1	5	3	1	2	6	3
now TV/HKUPOP	1,098	21–25 Aug	8	2	5	2	1	5	3	1	2	6	3
Cable TV/HKUPOP	1,848	20–24 Aug	7	4	5	2	1	5	3	1	2	5	7
now TV/HKUPOP	1,121	19–23 Aug	8	5	5	2	1	3	3	1	2	5	5
Cable TV/HKUPOP	1,773	18–22 Aug	6	6	5	2	1	4	3	1	2	5	9
now TV/HKUPOP	1,124	17–21 Aug	6	6	5	2	1	5	3	1	2	4	9
Cable TV/HKUPOP	1,724	17–21 Aug	8	6	5	2	1	3	3	1	2	4	5
now TV/HKUPOP	1,073	16–20 Aug	7	5	6	3	1	2	3	1	2	5	3
Cable TV/HKUPOP	1,622	15–19 Aug	7	5	6	3	1	4	2	1	2	4	3
now TV/HKUPOP	1,057	14–18 Aug	7	5	6	3	1	4	2	1	2	4	3
now TV/HKUPOP	1,045	13–17 Aug	5	6	7	2	1	4	3	1	2	4	9
Cable TV/HKUPOP	1,609	12–16 Aug	7	5	6	4	1	4	3	1	1	3	5
now TV/HKUPOP	1,112	11–15 Aug	7	7	5	3	1	3	3	1	2	3	5
Cable TV/HKUPOP	1,496	10–14 Aug	8	7	5	3	1	3	3	1	2	2	5
now TV/HKUPOP	1,083	9–13 Aug	8	6	5	4	1	3	3	1	2	2	3
Cable TV/HKUPOP	1,411	8–12 Aug	7	6	5	4	1	2	3	1	2	4	3
now TV/HKUPOP	1,044	7–11 Aug	7	7	5	3	1	2	3	1	2	4	5
Cable TV/HKUPOP	1,311	6–10 Aug	6	7	4	3	1	4	1	1	2	6	5
now TV/HKUPOP	939	5–9 Aug	6	5	6	4	2	2	1	1	2	6	1
Cable TV/HKUPOP	1,251	5–9 Aug	6	6	6	4	2	2	1	1	2	5	1
Cable TV/HKUPOP	1,211	4–8 Aug	6	6	5	4	1	3	2	1	3	4	3
now TV/HKUPOP	unknown	3–7 Aug	6	5	5	4	1	3	2	1	2	6	3
Cable TV/HKUPOP	1,137	2–6 Aug	6	6	5	4	1	2	3	1	2	5	5
HKRA	2,018	12–21 July	8	5	5	2	1	4	2	1	2	5	1

== Opinion polls by constituency ==
=== Hong Kong Island ===
Key: Pro-democrats secured; Pro-Beijing secured.

List No.			1	2	3	4	5	6	7	8	9	10	11	12	13	14	Undecided/ Don't know/ Won't vote
Poll source	Sample size	Dates administered	Hui	Sin (DP)	Lo (Ind)	GH Lau (PP)	Chung (DAB)	WC Ng (Ind)	SL Ho (Labour)	Ip (NPP)	Wong (FTU)	Chan (Civic)	KT Ho	Tsang (DAB)	KY Lau (Liberal)	MY Ng (LSD)	Undecided/ Don't know/ Won't vote
Election result		9 Sep 2012	0.9%	12.3%	5.1%	5.6%	10.2%	0.1%	9.5%	9.2%	8.3%	21.3%	0.1%	11.0%	5.4%	1.0%	N/A
Cable TV/HKUPOP	634	3–7 Sep 2012	<0.5%	6%	3%	5%	6%	<0.5%	6%	6%	4%	12%	<0.5%	8%	4%	<0.5%	40%
now TV/HKUPOP	380	3–7 Sep 2012	<0.5%	10%	6%	8%	10%	1%	10%	10%	7%	19%	<0.5%	13%	6%	1%	N/A
now TV/HKUPOP	363	2–6 Sep 2012	1%	9%	5%	9%	9%	<0.5%	8%	13%	7%	21%	<0.5%	11%	5%	1%	N/A
Cable TV/HKUPOP	600	2–6 Sep 2012	<0.5%	5%	3%	5%	6%	<0.5%	5%	7%	4%	13%	<0.5%	8%	3%	1%	39%
Cable TV/HKUPOP	576	1–5 Sep 2012	<0.5%	6%	3%	7%	6%	<0.87%	5%	7%	4%	13%	<0.5%	8%	3%	<0.5%	36%
now TV/HKUPOP	340	31 Aug–4 Sep 2012	1%	10%	4%	11%	7%	<0.5%	9%	11%	7%	22% 2 seats	<0.5%	13%	5%	1%	N/A
Cable TV/HKUPOP	544	31 Aug–4 Sep 2012	1%	6%	2%	7%	4%	<0.5%	6%	7%	4%	14% 2 seats	<0.5%	8%	3%	<0.5%	37%
Cable TV/HKUPOP	535	30 Aug–3 Sep 2012	<0.5%	6%	3%	6%	3%	<0.5%	5%	8%	4%	13% 2 seats	<0.5%	8%	4%	1%	38%
now TV/HKUPOP	333	30 Aug–3 Sep 2012	1%	10%	6%	10%	5%	<0.5%	8%	13%	6%	21% 2 seats	<0.5%	13%	6%	1%	N/A
now TV/HKUPOP	299	29 Aug–2 Sep 2012	1%	10%	6%	9%	4%	<0.5%	7%	14%	7%	19%	<0.5%	14%	6%	2%	N/A
Cable TV/HKUPOP	489	29 Aug–2 Sep 2012	<0.5%	6%	4%	6%	3%	<0.5%	4%	8%	4%	12%	<0.5%	9%	4%	1%	38%
Cable TV/HKUPOP	454	28 Aug–1 Sep 2012	<0.5%	6%	4%	5%	3%	<0.5%	5%	8%	5%	11%	<0.5%	11%	4%	1%	38%
now TV/HKUPOP	282	28 Aug–1 Sep 2012	1%	10%	7%	8%	5%	<0.5%	8%	13%	7%	17%	<0.5%	17%	6%	1%	N/A
now TV/HKUPOP	270	27–31 Aug 2012	<0.5%	9%	7%	8%	5%	<0.5%	7%	13%	7%	17%	<0.5%	17%	6%	2%	N/A
Cable TV/HKUPOP	435	27–31 Aug 2012	<0.5%	5%	4%	5%	3%	<0.5%	5%	8%	5%	11%	<0.5%	11%	4%	1%	38%
Cable TV/HKUPOP	411	26–30 Aug 2012	<0.5%	7%	5%	4%	4%	<0.5%	5%	8%	4%	9%	<0.5%	11%	4%	3%	38%
now TV/HKUPOP	257	26–30 Aug 2012	<0.5%	11%	8%	6%	6%	<0.5%	7%	13%	6%	14%	<0.5%	18%	6%	5%	N/A
now TV/HKUPOP	243	25–29 Aug 2012	1%	10%	5%	7%	7%	<0.5%	6%	12%	6%	17%	<0.5%	18%	6%	5%	N/A
Cable TV/HKUPOP	386	25–29 Aug 2012	<0.5%	6%	3%	5%	4%	<0.5%	4%	7%	4%	10%	<0.5%	12%	4%	3%	36%
Cable TV/HKUPOP	374	24–28 Aug 2012	<0.5%	6%	4%	6%	5%	<0.5%	4%	8%	3%	11%	<0.5%	11%	4%	3%	36%
now TV/HKUPOP	243	24–28 Aug 2012	1%	9%	7%	9%	7%	<0.5%	6%	12%	6%	16%	<0.5%	17%	6%	4%	N/A
now TV/HKUPOP	224	23–27 Aug 2012	2%	10%	7%	9%	7%	<0.5%	7%	11%	5%	16%	<0.5%	15%	7%	4%	N/A
Cable TV/HKUPOP	361	23–27 Aug 2012	1%	6%	4%	6%	4%	<0.5%	4%	7%	3%	10%	<0.5%	9%	4%	3%	38%
Cable TV/HKUPOP	351	22–26 Aug 2012	1%	4%	5%	5%	5%	<0.5%	5%	7%	4%	9%	<0.5%	9%	4%	2%	39%
now TV/HKUPOP	211	22–26 Aug 2012	2%	7%	8%	9%	8%	<0.5%	8%	11%	6%	16%	<0.5%	15%	7%	4%	N/A
now TV/HKUPOP	221	21–25 Aug 2012	3%	7%	9%	10%	7%	<0.5%	9%	12%	7%	16%	<0.5%	14%	6%	<0.5%	N/A
Cable TV/HKUPOP	372	21–25 Aug 2012	2%	4%	5%	6%	4%	<0.5%	5%	7%	4%	9%	<0.5%	9%	4%	<0.5%	41%
Cable TV/HKUPOP	369	20–24 Aug 2012	1%	6%	6%	6%	4%	<0.5%	5%	7%	4%	7%	<0.5%	9%	3%	<0.5%	40%
now TV/HKUPOP	219	20–24 Aug 2012	2%	10%	10%	10%	7%	<0.5%	8%	12%	7%	13%	<0.5%	15%	5%	<0.5%	N/A
now TV/HKUPOP	222	19–23 Aug 2012	2%	12%	8%	8%	9%	<0.5%	10%	13%	5%	11%	<0.5%	15%	6%	<0.5%	N/A
Cable TV/HKUPOP	373	19–23 Aug 2012	1%	7%	5%	5%	5%	<0.5%	6%	8%	3%	7%	<0.5%	9%	4%	<0.5%	40%
Cable TV/HKUPOP	348	18–22 Aug 2012	1%	8%	6%	5%	5%	<0.5%	5%	9%	4%	8%	<0.5%	9%	4%	1%	37%
now TV/HKUPOP	221	18–22 Aug 2012	1%	12%	9%	8%	8%	<0.5%	8%	14%	6%	13%	<0.5%	14%	6%	1%	N/A
now TV/HKUPOP	207	17–21 Aug 2012	1%	14%	7%	8%	6%	<0.5%	9%	14%	4%	15%	<0.5%	14%	5%	2%	N/A
Cable TV/HKUPOP	328	17–21 Aug 2012	1%	9%	5%	5%	4%	<0.5%	5%	9%	3%	10%	<0.5%	9%	3%	1%	37%
Cable TV/HKUPOP	288	16–20 Aug 2012	1%	10%	5%	4%	4%	<0.5%	5%	9%	3%	12%	<0.5%	8%	3%	1%	37%
now TV/HKUPOP	181	16–20 Aug 2012	1%	16%	7%	6%	6%	<0.5%	7%	15%	4%	19%	<0.5%	13%	5%	1%	N/A
now TV/HKUPOP	176	15–19 Aug 2012	<0.5%	16%	7%	5%	5%	<0.5%	9%	12%	6%	23% 2 seats	<0.5%	10%	5%	1%	N/A
Cable TV/HKUPOP	277	15–19 Aug 2012	<0.5%	10%	4%	3%	3%	<0.5%	6%	8%	4%	15% 2 seats	<0.5%	6%	3%	1%	37%
Cable TV/HKUPOP	279	14–18 Aug 2012	<0.5%	9%	5%	5%	2%	<0.5%	4%	7%	5%	17% 2 seats	<0.5%	6%	3%	1%	36%
now TV/HKUPOP	179	14–18 Aug 2012	<0.5%	15%	7%	7%	3%	<0.5%	7%	10%	8%	27% 2 seats	<0.5%	9%	5%	2%	N/A
now TV/HKUPOP	174	13–17 Aug 2012	<0.5%	15%	6%	8%	4%	1%	7%	10%	7%	25% 2 seats	<0.5%	13%	5%	1%	N/A
Cable TV/HKUPOP	281	13–17 Aug 2012	<0.5%	9%	4%	5%	2%	<0.5%	4%	6%	4%	15% 2 seats	<0.5%	8%	3%	<0.5%	39%
Cable TV/HKUPOP	292	12–16 Aug 2012	<0.5%	13%	4%	5%	2%	<0.5%	5%	8%	5%	12%	<0.5%	7%	4%	<0.5%	35%
now TV/HKUPOP	191	12–16 Aug 2012	<0.5%	19%	6%	7%	3%	1%	7%	11%	8%	19%	<0.5%	12%	6%	1%	N/A
now TV/HKUPOP	194	11–15 Aug 2012	1%	19%	4%	7%	3%	1%	8%	12%	8%	18%	<0.5%	13%	6%	1%	N/A
Cable TV/HKUPOP	295	11–15 Aug 2012	1%	13%	3%	5%	2%	<0.5%	5%	8%	5%	12%	<0.5%	9%	4%	<0.5%	35%
Cable TV/HKUPOP	289	10–14 Aug 2012	1%	15%	3%	5%	2%	1%	6%	11%	5%	12%	<0.5%	11%	3%	<0.5%	27%
now TV/HKUPOP	210	10–14 Aug 2012	1%	20%	4%	7%	3%	1%	8%	15%	7%	16%	<0.5%	16%	4%	<0.5%	N/A
now TV/HKUPOP	193	9–13 Aug 2012	1%	19%	6%	6%	2%	1%	7%	14%	6%	17%	<0.5%	18%	4%	<0.5%	N/A
Cable TV/HKUPOP	275	9–13 Aug 2012	1%	14%	4%	4%	1%	1%	5%	10%	4%	12%	<0.5%	13%	2%	<0.5%	31%
Cable TV/HKUPOP	263	8–12 Aug 2012	1%	13%	5%	4%	2%	<0.5%	6%	12%	5%	9%	<0.5%	12%	3%	<0.5%	27%
now TV/HKUPOP	192	8–12 Aug 2012	1%	18%	6%	6%	2%	<0.5%	8%	17%	7%	13%	<0.5%	17%	5%	<0.5%	N/A
now TV/HKUPOP	181	7–11 Aug 2012	1%	12%	6%	5%	2%	<0.5%	8%	17%	6%	13%	<0.5%	26%	4%	<0.5%	N/A
Cable TV/HKUPOP	262	6–10 Aug 2012	1%	9%	7%	6%	3%	<0.5%	4%	12%	7%	12%	<0.5%	15%	4%	<0.5%	21%
now TV/HKUPOP	207	6–10 Aug 2012	<0.5%	12%	8%	7%	3%	<0.5%	6%	15%	8%	16%	<0.5%	19%	5%	<0.5%	N/A
now TV/HKUPOP	193	5–9 Aug 2012	1%	10%	9%	6%	5%	<0.5%	4%	16%	9%	16%	1%	18%	6%	<0.5%	N/A
Cable TV/HKUPOP	240	5–9 Aug 2012	1%	8%	7%	5%	4%	<0.5%	3%	13%	7%	13%	1%	15%	5%	<0.5%	20%
Cable TV/HKUPOP	237	4–8 Aug 2012	1%	9%	4%	6%	4%	<0.5%	5%	17% 2 seats	7%	11%	1%	13%	4%	<0.5%	18%
now TV/HKUPOP	unknown	4–8 Aug 2012	1%	10%	5%	8%	5%	<0.5%	6%	21% 2 seats	8%	14%	1%	16%	5%	<0.5%	N/A
now TV/HKUPOP	unknown	3–7 Aug 2012	1%	13%	6%	7%	4%	<0.5%	5%	18%	8%	16%	1%	15%	5%	<0.5%	N/A
Cable TV/HKUPOP	241	3–7 Aug 2012	1%	11%	5%	5%	4%	<0.5%	4%	15%	5%	13%	1%	12%	4%	<0.5%	19%
Cable TV/HKUPOP	255	2–6 Aug 2012	1%	11%	5%	5%	3%	<0.5%	5%	12%	6%	12%	1%	10%	5%	1%	21%
Cable TV/HKUPOP	247	1–5 Aug 2012	1%	12%	4%	5%	3%	<0.5%	6%	12%	5%	11%	<0.5%	11%	5%	1%	23%
now TV/HKUPOP	1,266	1–5 Aug 2012	1%	15%	6%	7%	3%	<0.5%	8%	16%	7%	15%	1%	15%	6%	2%	N/A
HKRA	2,018	12–21 Jul 2012	N/A	5.6%	2.8%	3.6%	2.4%	N/A	8.5%	11.7%	9.3%	10.2%	N/A	16.9%	2.3%	0.5%	22.2%

=== Kowloon East ===
Key: Pro-democrats secured; Pro-Beijing secured.

List No.			1	2	3	4	5	6	7	8	9	Undecided/ Don't know/ Won't vote
Poll source	Sample size	Dates administered	Leong (Civic)	KK Wong (FTU)	To (LSD)	Yim	Wu (DP)	Chan (DAB)	Tse (Ind)	YT Wong (PP)	Tam (Ind)	Undecided/ Don't know/ Won't vote
Election result		9 Sep 2012	14.6%	14.3%	9.6%	1.1%	15.6%	16.7%	13.5%	12.6%	1.9%	N/A
Cable TV/HKUPOP	544	3–7 Sep 2012	13%	7%	5%	<0.5%	9%	10%	6%	7%	1%	42%
now TV/HKUPOP	313	3–7 Sep 2012	22%	11%	8%	1%	16%	17%	10%	13%	2%	N/A
now TV/HKUPOP	278	2–6 Sep 2012	22%	14%	7%	1%	15%	16%	9%	14%	2%	N/A
Cable TV/HKUPOP	489	2–6 Sep 2012	12%	8%	4%	1%	9%	9%	5%	8%	1%	43%
Cable TV/HKUPOP	473	1–5 Sep 2012	13%	9%	4%	1%	8%	9%	5%	8%	1%	43%
now TV/HKUPOP	263	31 Aug–4 Sep 2012	22%	16%	9%	<0.5%	14%	16%	8%	13%	2%	N/A
Cable TV/HKUPOP	448	31 Aug–4 Sep 2012	13%	9%	5%	1%	8%	10%	5%	7%	1%	42%
Cable TV/HKUPOP	437	30 Aug–3 Sep 2012	13%	9%	6%	1%	8%	10%	5%	7%	1%	41%
now TV/HKUPOP	257	30 Aug–3 Sep 2012	22%	16%	10%	1%	14%	16%	8%	12%	2%	N/A
now TV/HKUPOP	259	29 Aug–2 Sep 2012	20%	14%	11%	1%	15%	18%	8%	12%	2%	N/A
Cable TV/HKUPOP	440	29 Aug–2 Sep 2012	12%	8%	6%	<0.5%	9%	10%	5%	7%	1%	42%
Cable TV/HKUPOP	452	28 Aug–1 Sep 2012	12%	8%	7%	1%	8%	12%	5%	6%	1%	41%
now TV/HKUPOP	269	28 Aug–1 Sep 2012	19%	13%	11%	1%	14%	20%	9%	10%	2%	N/A
now TV/HKUPOP	269	27–31 Aug 2012	18%	11%	11%	1%	13%	22%	9%	12%	3%	N/A
Cable TV/HKUPOP	430	27–31 Aug 2012	11%	7%	7%	1%	8%	14%	6%	7%	2%	37%
Cable TV/HKUPOP	407	26–30 Aug 2012	13%	6%	6%	<0.5%	7%	14%	7%	7%	2%	37%
now TV/HKUPOP	257	26–30 Aug 2012	20%	10%	10%	1%	11%	23%	10%	12%	4%	N/A
now TV/HKUPOP	242	25–29 Aug 2012	19%	11%	9%	<0.5%	9%	24%	11%	13%	3%	N/A
Cable TV/HKUPOP	383	25–29 Aug 2012	12%	7%	5%	<0.5%	6%	15%	7%	8%	2%	36%
Cable TV/HKUPOP	363	24–28 Aug 2012	11%	7%	4%	<0.5%	6%	15%	9%	9%	2%	37%
now TV/HKUPOP	229	24–28 Aug 2012	18%	11%	6%	1%	9%	23%	15%	14%	3%	N/A
now TV/HKUPOP	222	23–27 Aug 2012	18%	12%	7%	<0.5%	9%	20%	16%	15%	4%	N/A
Cable TV/HKUPOP	354	23–27 Aug 2012	11%	7%	5%	<0.5%	5%	12%	10%	9%	3%	37%
Cable TV/HKUPOP	352	22–26 Aug 2012	10%	8%	4%	<0.5%	6%	12%	9%	8%	2%	41%
now TV/HKUPOP	208	22–26 Aug 2012	17%	13%	7%	1%	10%	19%	15%	14%	3%	N/A
now TV/HKUPOP	205	21–25 Aug 2012	15%	13%	6%	2%	13%	19%	15%	14%	3%	N/A
Cable TV/HKUPOP	353	21–25 Aug 2012	9%	8%	3%	1%	7%	11%	9%	8%	2%	42%
Cable TV/HKUPOP	346	20–24 Aug 2012	9%	8%	3%	1%	8%	12%	9%	8%	2%	40%
now TV/HKUPOP	209	20–24 Aug 2012	15%	13%	6%	2%	13%	19%	14%	13%	4%	N/A
now TV/HKUPOP	205	19–23 Aug 2012	18%	14%	7%	2%	12%	20%	10%	14%	3%	N/A
Cable TV/HKUPOP	327	19–23 Aug 2012	11%	9%	4%	1%	8%	12%	6%	9%	2%	37%
Cable TV/HKUPOP	304	18–22 Aug 2012	13%	9%	3%	1%	9%	14%	5%	8%	2%	37%
now TV/HKUPOP	192	18–22 Aug 2012	20%	14%	5%	2%	14%	22%	8%	13%	3%	N/A
Cable TV/HKUPOP	292	17–21 Aug 2012	13%	11%	4%	2%	9%	13%	5%	8%	2%	33%
Cable TV/HKUPOP	286	16–20 Aug 2012	14%	12%	5%	1%	9%	12%	6%	7%	2%	32%
now TV/HKUPOP	166	16–20 Aug 2012	20%	17%	8%	1%	13%	18%	9%	11%	3%	N/A
now TV/HKUPOP	191	15–19 Aug 2012	24%	18%	6%	1%	13%	15%	11%	9%	3%	N/A
Cable TV/HKUPOP	289	15–19 Aug 2012	16%	12%	4%	1%	9%	10%	7%	6%	2%	34%
Cable TV/HKUPOP	294	14–18 Aug 2012	15%	10%	3%	<0.5%	8%	10%	9%	5%	2%	37%
now TV/HKUPOP	187	14–18 Aug 2012	24%	16%	5%	1%	13%	15%	15%	7%	3%	N/A
now TV/HKUPOP	196	13–17 Aug 2012	22%	14%	6%	2%	13%	17%	17%	5%	4%	N/A
Cable TV/HKUPOP	297	13–17 Aug 2012	15%	9%	4%	1%	8%	11%	11%	4%	2%	34%
Cable TV/HKUPOP	288	12–16 Aug 2012	15%	9%	3%	1%	6%	14%	10%	4%	4%	33%
now TV/HKUPOP	192	12–16 Aug 2012	21%	14%	5%	1%	10%	22%	15%	7%	6%	N/A
now TV/HKUPOP	196	11–15 Aug 2012	20%	12%	4%	1%	10%	26%	13%	7%	6%	N/A
Cable TV/HKUPOP	298	11–15 Aug 2012	13%	8%	2%	1%	7%	17%	9%	5%	4%	34%
Cable TV/HKUPOP	255	10–14 Aug 2012	15%	11%	4%	1%	7%	24% 2 seats	7%	5%	4%	21%
now TV/HKUPOP	200	10–14 Aug 2012	19%	14%	5%	1%	9%	31% 2 seats	9%	6%	5%	N/A
now TV/HKUPOP	205	9–13 Aug 2012	21%	14%	5%	1%	11%	29% 2 seats	8%	6%	5%	N/A
Cable TV/HKUPOP	259	9–13 Aug 2012	17%	11%	4%	1%	8%	23% 2 seats	6%	5%	4%	21%
Cable TV/HKUPOP	247	8–12 Aug 2012	17%	14%	4%	<0.5%	9%	22%	6%	5%	3%	20%
now TV/HKUPOP	208	8–12 Aug 2012	21%	17%	6%	<0.5%	11%	28%	8%	6%	4%	N/A
now TV/HKUPOP	201	7–11 Aug 2012	24%	15%	7%	<0.5%	12%	25%	8%	8%	2%	N/A
Cable TV/HKUPOP	247	6–10 Aug 2012	21%	11%	5%	<0.5%	8%	16%	6%	7%	1%	25%
now TV/HKUPOP	185	6–10 Aug 2012	28%	15%	7%	<0.5%	11%	21%	8%	9%	1%	N/A
now TV/HKUPOP	169	5–9 Aug 2012	30%	13%	7%	<0.5%	11%	18%	11%	9%	1%	N/A
Cable TV/HKUPOP	238	5–9 Aug 2012	21%	9%	5%	<0.5%	8%	13%	8%	6%	1%	29%
Cable TV/HKUPOP	220	4–8 Aug 2012	21%	10%	5%	<0.5%	7%	13%	7%	7%	1%	30%
now TV/HKUPOP	unknown	4–8 Aug 2012	29%	14%	6%	<0.5%	10%	19%	10%	10%	2%	N/A
now TV/HKUPOP	unknown	3–7 Aug 2012	28%	12%	7%	<0.5%	9%	20%	9%	13%	2%	N/A
Cable TV/HKUPOP	199	3–7 Aug 2012	19%	9%	5%	<0.5%	6%	14%	7%	9%	1%	31%
Cable TV/HKUPOP	194	2–6 Aug 2012	19%	9%	5%	<0.5%	7%	15%	7%	5%	2%	30%
now TV/HKUPOP	1,266	1–5 Aug 2012	24%	14%	7%	<0.5%	9%	23%	12%	6%	4%	N/A
HKRA	2,018	12–21 Jul 2012	13.0%	8.6%	2.9%	N/A	6.2%	14.6%	6.0%	5.4%	2.2%	25.8%

=== Kowloon West ===
Key: Pro-democrats secured; Pro-Beijing secured.

List No.			1	2	3	4	5	6	7	8	9	Undecided/ Don't know/ Won't vote
Poll source	Sample size	Dates administered	YH Wong (Ind)	PW Wong (DP)	Tam (ADPL)	TY Wong (Ind)	Chiang (DAB)	YM Wong (PP)	Lam (HKAA)	Leung (Kln West)	Mo (Civic)	Undecided/ Don't know/ Won't vote
Election result		9 Sep 2012	1.7%	15.5%	13.2%	1.0%	20.4%	16.6%	0.4%	14.9%	16.3%	N/A
Cable TV/HKUPOP	438	3–7 Sep 2012	<0.5%	13%	5%	<0.5%	10%	13%	<0.5%	10%	10%	37%
now TV/HKUPOP	272	3–7 Sep 2012	1%	21%	8%	1%	16%	21%	<0.5%	16%	17%	N/A
now TV/HKUPOP	245	2–6 Sep 2012	1%	21%	7%	1%	18%	20%	<0.5%	16%	16%	N/A
Cable TV/HKUPOP	397	2–6 Sep 2012	<0.5%	13%	4%	<0.5%	11%	13%	<0.5%	10%	10%	37%
Cable TV/HKUPOP	388	1–5 Sep 2012	1%	12%	5%	1%	12%	12%	<0.5%	7%	11%	39%
now TV/HKUPOP	241	31 Aug–4 Sep 2012	2%	17%	9%	1%	21%	22%	2%	13%	15%	N/A
Cable TV/HKUPOP	388	31 Aug–4 Sep 2012	1%	10%	5%	1%	13%	13%	1%	8%	9%	39%
Cable TV/HKUPOP	392	30 Aug–3 Sep 2012	1%	9%	6%	1%	13%	15%	1%	7%	9%	37%
now TV/HKUPOP	248	30 Aug–3 Sep 2012	2%	15%	10%	2%	21%	23%	2%	11%	15%	N/A
now TV/HKUPOP	237	29 Aug–2 Sep 2012	2%	16%	11%	1%	21%	23%	1%	9%	15%	N/A
Cable TV/HKUPOP	388	29 Aug–2 Sep 2012	1%	10%	7%	<0.5%	13%	14%	1%	6%	9%	39%
Cable TV/HKUPOP	367	28 Aug–1 Sep 2012	1%	8%	8%	1%	11%	15%	1%	5%	9%	41%
now TV/HKUPOP	218	28 Aug–1 Sep 2012	2%	13%	14%	1%	19%	25%	1%	9%	16%	N/A
now TV/HKUPOP	202	27–31 Aug 2012	1%	15%	16%	1%	20%	23%	1%	10%	14%	N/A
Cable TV/HKUPOP	347	27–31 Aug 2012	<0.5%	9%	9%	<0.5%	12%	13%	1%	6%	8%	42%
Cable TV/HKUPOP	319	26–30 Aug 2012	<0.5%	9%	9%	<0.5%	11%	13%	<0.5%	5%	8%	44%
now TV/HKUPOP	180	26–30 Aug 2012	1%	17%	17%	1%	19%	23%	<0.5%	9%	15%	N/A
now TV/HKUPOP	162	25–29 Aug 2012	1%	14%	16%	<0.5%	23%	18%	1%	13%	13%	N/A
Cable TV/HKUPOP	291	25–29 Aug 2012	<0.5%	8%	9%	<0.5%	13%	10%	<0.5%	8%	7%	44%
Cable TV/HKUPOP	277	24–28 Aug 2012	<0.5%	7%	8%	<0.5%	14%	12%	<0.5%	7%	6%	45%
now TV/HKUPOP	150	24–28 Aug 2012	<0.5%	14%	14%	<0.5%	25%	22%	1%	12%	11%	N/A
now TV/HKUPOP	155	23–27 Aug 2012	<0.5%	15%	13%	<0.5%	25%	20%	1%	14%	13%	N/A
Cable TV/HKUPOP	280	23–27 Aug 2012	<0.5%	8%	7%	<0.5%	14%	11%	1%	8%	6%	45%
Cable TV/HKUPOP	285	22–26 Aug 2012	<0.5%	7%	8%	<0.5%	14%	11%	<0.5%	8%	9%	43%
now TV/HKUPOP	164	22–26 Aug 2012	<0.5%	13%	14%	<0.5%	24%	20%	1%	14%	15%	N/A
now TV/HKUPOP	179	21–25 Aug 2012	<0.5%	13%	13%	<0.5%	22%	18%	1%	17%	16%	N/A
Cable TV/HKUPOP	296	21–25 Aug 2012	<0.5%	8%	8%	<0.5%	13%	11%	<0.5%	10%	10%	39%
Cable TV/HKUPOP	297	20–24 Aug 2012	<0.5%	8%	7%	<0.5%	12%	14%	<0.5%	10%	11%	36%
now TV/HKUPOP	188	20–24 Aug 2012	<0.5%	13%	11%	<0.5%	19%	23%	<0.5%	16%	17%	N/A
now TV/HKUPOP	185	19–23 Aug 2012	2%	15%	10%	<0.5%	18%	20%	<0.5%	18%	17%	N/A
Cable TV/HKUPOP	290	19–23 Aug 2012	1%	9%	6%	<0.5%	12%	13%	<0.5%	11%	11%	36%
Cable TV/HKUPOP	288	18–22 Aug 2012	1%	10%	6%	<0.5%	12%	14%	1%	11%	12%	33%
now TV/HKUPOP	192	18–22 Aug 2012	2%	15%	9%	<0.5%	18%	21%	1%	16%	19%	N/A
now TV/HKUPOP	180	17–21 Aug 2012	2%	16%	7%	<0.5%	16%	23%	1%	17%	18%	N/A
Cable TV/HKUPOP	274	17–21 Aug 2012	1%	11%	5%	<0.5%	10%	15%	1%	11%	12%	35%
Cable TV/HKUPOP	264	16–20 Aug 2012	3%	10%	4%	<0.5%	13%	14%	<0.5%	8%	10%	37%
now TV/HKUPOP	166	16–20 Aug 2012	4%	16%	6%	<0.5%	21%	22%	1%	13%	16%	N/A
now TV/HKUPOP	152	15–19 Aug 2012	4%	20%	7%	<0.5%	18%	19%	1%	15%	15%	N/A
Cable TV/HKUPOP	251	15–19 Aug 2012	1%	12%	3%	<0.5%	11%	11%	1%	9%	9%	39%
Cable TV/HKUPOP	262	14–18 Aug 2012	1%	10%	5%	<0.5%	14%	13%	1%	10%	10%	36%
now TV/HKUPOP	168	14–18 Aug 2012	2%	16%	8%	<0.5%	20%	22%	1%	15%	16%	N/A
now TV/HKUPOP	163	13–17 Aug 2012	2%	14%	7%	<0.5%	22%	20%	<0.5%	15%	20%	N/A
Cable TV/HKUPOP	261	13–17 Aug 2012	1%	9%	4%	<0.5%	14%	13%	<0.5%	9%	12%	37%
Cable TV/HKUPOP	250	12–16 Aug 2012	2%	9%	4%	<0.5%	15%	13%	<0.5%	10%	10%	36%
now TV/HKUPOP	159	12–16 Aug 2012	3%	15%	6%	<0.5%	24%	20%	<0.5%	16%	16%	N/A
now TV/HKUPOP	152	11–15 Aug 2012	1%	17%	8%	<0.5%	21%	18%	<0.5%	17%	17%	N/A
Cable TV/HKUPOP	242	11–15 Aug 2012	1%	11%	5%	<0.5%	13%	12%	<0.5%	11%	11%	37%
Cable TV/HKUPOP	203	10–14 Aug 2012	1%	11%	6%	<0.5%	18%	13%	<0.5%	13%	11%	27%
now TV/HKUPOP	147	10–14 Aug 2012	1%	15%	8%	<0.5%	25%	18%	<0.5%	18%	15%	N/A
now TV/HKUPOP	144	9–13 Aug 2012	4%	16%	8%	<0.5%	25%	16%	<0.5%	18%	12%	N/A
Cable TV/HKUPOP	200	9–13 Aug 2012	3%	11%	6%	<0.5%	18%	12%	<0.5%	13%	9%	26%
Cable TV/HKUPOP	194	8–12 Aug 2012	2%	12%	6%	<0.5%	20%	13%	<0.5%	13%	8%	26%
now TV/HKUPOP	144	8–12 Aug 2012	3%	16%	8%	<0.5%	26%	18%	<0.5%	18%	10%	N/A
now TV/HKUPOP	157	7–11 Aug 2012	3%	15%	9%	<0.5%	27%	16%	<0.5%	19%	11%	N/A
Cable TV/HKUPOP	198	6–10 Aug 2012	2%	12%	9%	<0.5%	21%	19%	<0.5%	16%	6%	24%
now TV/HKUPOP	149	6–10 Aug 2012	2%	16%	12%	<0.5%	28%	14%	<0.5%	21%	8%	N/A
now TV/HKUPOP	150	5–9 Aug 2012	2%	14%	11%	<0.5%	24%	15%	<0.5%	23%	12%	N/A
Cable TV/HKUPOP	198	5–9 Aug 2012	1%	11%	8%	<0.5%	18%	11%	<0.5%	17%	9%	24%
Cable TV/HKUPOP	187	4–8 Aug 2012	<0.5%	10%	10%	<0.5%	20%	9%	<0.5%	15%	12%	23%
now TV/HKUPOP	unknown	4–8 Aug 2012	1%	13%	13%	<0.5%	26%	12%	<0.5%	19%	16%	N/A
now TV/HKUPOP	unknown	3–7 Aug 2012	1%	15%	12%	<0.5%	24%	11%	<0.5%	18%	20%	N/A
Cable TV/HKUPOP	184	3–7 Aug 2012	<0.5%	11%	9%	<0.5%	18%	8%	<0.5%	13%	15%	25%
Cable TV/HKUPOP	1,266	2–6 Aug 2012	1%	10%	8%	<0.5%	16%	10%	<0.5%	11%	12%	32%
Cable TV/HKUPOP	157	1–5 Aug 2012	1%	9%	6%	<0.5%	15%	12%	<0.5%	9%	14%	34%
now TV/HKUPOP	1,266	1–5 Aug 2012	1%	13%	10%	<0.5%	23%	19%	<0.5%	13%	21%	N/A
HKRA	2,018	12–21 Jul 2012	N/A	10.7%	1.8%	N/A	12.3%	17.0%	N/A	12.6%	11.8%	25.1%

=== New Territories East ===
Key: Pro-democrats secured; Pro-Beijing secured.

List No.			1	2	3	4	5	6	7	8	9	10	11	12	13	14	15	16	17	18	19	Undecided/ Don't know/ Won't vote
Poll source	Sample size	Dates administered	Leung (LSD)	Ip (FTU)	Lau (DP)	Leung (Ind)	OL Pong (CF)	Quat (DAB)	CC Chan (PP)	Yau (ES)	HK Chan (DAB)	Cheung (Lab)	Tsoi (DP)	Fan (ND)	Tien (LP)	SC Wong (DP)	Tong (Civic)	Ho (Ind)	YM Pong	Fong (Ind)	KK Chan	Undecided/ Don't know/ Won't vote
Election result		9 Sep 2012	10.4%	5.3%	8.0%	0.2%	5.2%	9.9%	8.2%	1.2%	8.8%	8.5%	2.2%	6.2%	6.7%	4.5%	7.1%	0.6%	1.3%	5.3%	0.5%	N/A
Cable TV/HKUPOP	881	3–7 Sep 2012	8%	3%	6%	<0.5%	4%	4%	6%	<0.5%	5%	3%	1%	2%	4%	2%	3%	<0.5%	<0.5%	3%	<0.5%	45%
now TV/HKUPOP	486	3–7 Sep 2012	15%	5%	10%	1%	8%	8%	10%	<0.5%	9%	5%	2%	3%	7%	4%	6%	1%	1%	6%	1%	N/A
now TV/HKUPOP	469	2–6 Sep 2012	15%	5%	10%	<0.5%	6%	6%	10%	<0.5%	9%	5%	3%	4%	7%	3%	6%	1%	1%	7%	1%	N/A
Cable TV/HKUPOP	840	2–6 Sep 2012	9%	3%	5%	<0.5%	3%	3%	6%	<0.5%	5%	3%	1%	2%	4%	2%	3%	<0.5%	<0.5%	4%	1%	45%
Cable TV/HKUPOP	844	1–5 Sep 2012	8%	3%	6%	<0.5%	3%	4%	6%	<0.5%	5%	3%	1%	3%	5%	2%	4%	<0.5%	1%	4%	1%	42%
now TV/HKUPOP	483	31 Aug–4 Sep 2012	14%	5%	12%	<0.5%	5%	7%	9%	<0.5%	9%	5%	2%	5%	9%	3%	6%	1%	1%	6%	1%	N/A
Cable TV/HKUPOP	852	31 Aug–4 Sep 2012	8%	3%	7%	<0.5%	3%	4%	5%	<0.5%	5%	3%	1%	3%	5%	2%	3%	<0.5%	<0.5%	4%	<0.5%	42%
Cable TV/HKUPOP	848	30 Aug–3 Sep 2012	8%	2%	7%	<0.5%	2%	4%	5%	<0.5%	6%	3%	1%	3%	5%	2%	3%	<0.5%	1%	3%	<0.5%	40%
now TV/HKUPOP	495	30 Aug–3 Sep 2012	14%	4%	11%	1%	4%	7%	9%	<0.5%	10%	6%	2%	5%	9%	4%	6%	1%	2%	6%	1%	N/A
now TV/HKUPOP	477	29 Aug–2 Sep 2012	13%	5%	11%	<0.5%	4%	6%	8%	<0.5%	9%	7%	2%	5%	10%	4%	7%	1%	2%	6%	1%	N/A
Cable TV/HKUPOP	818	29 Aug–2 Sep 2012	8%	3%	7%	<0.5%	2%	4%	4%	<0.5%	5%	4%	1%	3%	6%	2%	4%	<0.5%	1%	3%	1%	42%
Cable TV/HKUPOP	791	28 Aug–1 Sep 2012	7%	3%	7%	<0.5%	3%	4%	5%	<0.5%	5%	4%	1%	2%	6%	3%	3%	<0.5%	1%	4%	<0.5%	43%
now TV/HKUPOP	452	28 Aug–1 Sep 2012	13%	5%	12%	<0.5%	4%	6%	9%	<0.5%	8%	6%	1%	4%	10%	5%	6%	<0.5%	1%	7%	<0.5%	N/A
now TV/HKUPOP	444	27–31 Aug 2012	13%	4%	12%	1%	4%	6%	8%	1%	9%	7%	2%	4%	10%	5%	5%	1%	2%	5%	1%	N/A
Cable TV/HKUPOP	784	27–31 Aug 2012	8%	3%	7%	1%	2%	3%	5%	<0.5%	5%	4%	1%	2%	6%	3%	3%	<0.5%	1%	3%	<0.5%	44%
Cable TV/HKUPOP	718	26–30 Aug 2012	7%	3%	6%	1%	3%	3%	4%	1%	6%	5%	1%	2%	5%	3%	4%	<0.5%	1%	2%	<0.5%	45%
now TV/HKUPOP	411	26–30 Aug 2012	13%	6%	11%	1%	5%	5%	7%	1%	10%	8%	2%	4%	9%	5%	6%	1%	2%	4%	1%	N/A
now TV/HKUPOP	359	25–29 Aug 2012	12%	6%	10%	1%	5%	5%	8%	1%	10%	8%	1%	4%	10%	5%	6%	1%	2%	4%	1%	N/A
Cable TV/HKUPOP	645	25–29 Aug 2012	7%	3%	6%	<0.5%	3%	3%	5%	1%	5%	5%	1%	2%	6%	3%	4%	1%	1%	2%	<0.5%	44%
Cable TV/HKUPOP	614	24–28 Aug 2012	6%	3%	5%	1%	3%	3%	4%	1%	6%	5%	1%	2%	6%	3%	3%	<0.5%	1%	3%	<0.5%	45%
now TV/HKUPOP	333	24–28 Aug 2012	12%	6%	9%	1%	5%	6%	8%	1%	11%	9%	1%	3%	11%	5%	5%	1%	1%	5%	1%	N/A
now TV/HKUPOP	324	23–27 Aug 2012	12%	5%	9%	1%	5%	6%	7%	1%	13%	10%	2%	4%	11%	4%	6%	<0.5%	1%	3%	1%	N/A
Cable TV/HKUPOP	586	23–27 Aug 2012	6%	3%	5%	1%	3%	3%	4%	1%	7%	6%	1%	2%	6%	2%	3%	<0.5%	1%	2%	<0.5%	45%
Cable TV/HKUPOP	531	22–26 Aug 2012	6%	3%	5%	<0.5%	3%	3%	4%	<0.5%	7%	5%	1%	2%	6%	2%	4%	<0.5%	1%	2%	<0.5%	47%
now TV/HKUPOP	287	22–26 Aug 2012	11%	5%	10%	<0.5%	6%	6%	8%	1%	12%	9%	1%	4%	10%	4%	7%	<0.5%	1%	4%	1%	N/A
now TV/HKUPOP	275	21–25 Aug 2012	13%	4%	12%	<0.5%	5%	7%	10%	1%	8%	9%	1%	4%	11%	4%	6%	<0.5%	<0.5%	4%	1%	N/A
Cable TV/HKUPOP	517	21–25 Aug 2012	7%	2%	6%	<0.5%	3%	4%	5%	<0.5%	4%	5%	1%	2%	6%	2%	3%	<0.5%	<0.5%	2%	<0.5%	47%
Cable TV/HKUPOP	505	20–24 Aug 2012	7%	3%	7%	<0.5%	3%	3%	4%	<0.5%	5%	4%	1%	3%	5%	2%	6%	<0.5%	<0.5%	2%	1%	44%
now TV/HKUPOP	282	20–24 Aug 2012	13%	5%	13%	<0.5%	5%	6%	7%	<0.5%	9%	7%	2%	5%	11%	4%	8%	1%	<0.5%	4%	1%	N/A
now TV/HKUPOP	293	19–23 Aug 2012	14%	4%	14%	<0.5%	5%	5%	5%	<0.5%	10%	6%	2%	5%	9%	4%	10%	1%	<0.5%	3%	1%	N/A
Cable TV/HKUPOP	492	19–23 Aug 2012	9%	2%	8%	<0.5%	3%	3%	3%	<0.5%	6%	4%	1%	3%	6%	2%	6%	1%	<0.5%	2%	<0.5%	40%
Cable TV/HKUPOP	488	18–22 Aug 2012	7%	3%	8%	<0.5%	3%	3%	3%	<0.5%	5%	4%	2%	3%	6%	3%	6%	1%	1%	1%	<0.5%	41%
now TV/HKUPOP	292	18–22 Aug 2012	11%	5%	14%	<0.5%	6%	4%	5%	<0.5%	8%	6%	2%	6%	10%	6%	10%	2%	1%	2%	1%	N/A
now TV/HKUPOP	301	17–21 Aug 2012	10%	5%	14%	<0.5%	6%	4%	5%	1%	9%	6%	3%	4%	12%	5%	10%	2%	2%	2%	<0.5%	N/A
Cable TV/HKUPOP	488	17–21 Aug 2012	6%	3%	8%	<0.5%	3%	3%	3%	<0.5%	5%	4%	2%	3%	8%	3%	6%	1%	1%	1%	<0.5%	38%
Cable TV/HKUPOP	457	16–20 Aug 2012	6%	3%	7%	<0.5%	3%	4%	2%	<0.5%	5%	4%	2%	2%	7%	3%	7%	1%	1%	2%	<0.5%	37%
now TV/HKUPOP	284	16–20 Aug 2012	10%	5%	12%	<0.5%	6%	5%	4%	1%	9%	6%	3%	4%	12%	5%	11%	2%	2%	4%	<0.5%	N/A
now TV/HKUPOP	293	15–19 Aug 2012	12%	5%	12%	<0.5%	6%	6%	4%	1%	11%	8%	2%	3%	11%	4%	9%	1%	2%	3%	<0.5%	N/A
Cable TV/HKUPOP	465	15–19 Aug 2012	7%	3%	7%	<0.5%	4%	4%	3%	1%	7%	5%	1%	2%	7%	3%	5%	<0.5%	1%	2%	<0.5%	37%
Cable TV/HKUPOP	460	14–18 Aug 2012	7%	3%	8%	<0.5%	5%	3%	4%	1%	6%	5%	1%	1%	7%	2%	5%	1%	1%	2%	<0.5%	37%
now TV/HKUPOP	292	14–18 Aug 2012	11%	5%	13%	<0.5%	7%	5%	6%	1%	10%	8%	2%	2%	11%	4%	8%	1%	1%	3%	<0.5%	N/A
now TV/HKUPOP	300	13–17 Aug 2012	13%	5%	16%	<0.5%	6%	5%	7%	1%	10%	7%	2%	1%	12%	4%	6%	1%	<0.5%	3%	<0.5%	N/A
Cable TV/HKUPOP	463	13–17 Aug 2012	8%	3%	10%	<0.5%	4%	3%	5%	1%	6%	5%	2%	1%	8%	2%	4%	1%	<0.5%	2%	<0.5%	35%
Cable TV/HKUPOP	477	12–16 Aug 2012	9%	4%	9%	<0.5%	3%	4%	4%	1%	7%	4%	1%	1%	7%	2%	4%	1%	<0.5%	2%	<0.5%	36%
now TV/HKUPOP	304	12–16 Aug 2012	15%	7%	14%	<0.5%	4%	6%	6%	1%	11%	7%	2%	2%	11%	4%	7%	1%	<0.5%	4%	<0.5%	N/A
now TV/HKUPOP	341	11–15 Aug 2012	12%	6%	18% 2 seats	<0.5%	5%	7%	6%	1%	10%	6%	2%	3%	11%	3%	8%	1%	<0.5%	2%	<0.5%	N/A
Cable TV/HKUPOP	508	11–15 Aug 2012	8%	4%	12% 2 seats	<0.5%	3%	4%	4%	1%	7%	4%	1%	2%	8%	2%	5%	1%	<0.5%	2%	<0.5%	33%
Cable TV/HKUPOP	449	10–14 Aug 2012	8%	4%	14% 2 seats	<0.5%	3%	4%	4%	1%	7%	4%	2%	3%	8%	3%	6%	1%	<0.5%	2%	<0.5%	27%
now TV/HKUPOP	327	10–14 Aug 2012	10%	6%	20% 2 seats	<0.5%	3%	6%	5%	1%	9%	5%	2%	4%	11%	4%	9%	1%	<0.5%	2%	<0.5%	N/A
now TV/HKUPOP	312	9–13 Aug 2012	11%	6%	20% 2 seats	<0.5%	3%	6%	4%	<0.5%	10%	5%	2%	5%	11%	5%	8%	<0.5%	<0.5%	4%	<0.5%	N/A
Cable TV/HKUPOP	429	9–13 Aug 2012	8%	4%	14% 2 seats	<0.5%	2%	4%	3%	<0.5%	7%	4%	2%	4%	8%	4%	6%	<0.5%	<0.5%	3%	<0.5%	27%
Cable TV/HKUPOP	422	8–12 Aug 2012	8%	4%	13% 2 seats	<0.5%	3%	4%	2%	<0.5%	8%	4%	1%	4%	9%	4%	7%	<0.5%	<0.5%	3%	<0.5%	25%
now TV/HKUPOP	315	8–12 Aug 2012	10%	6%	17%	<0.5%	3%	6%	3%	<0.5%	10%	6%	2%	6%	11%	5%	10%	<0.5%	<0.5%	4%	<0.5%	N/A
now TV/HKUPOP	310	7–11 Aug 2012	13%	5%	19% 2 seats	<0.5%	3%	5%	3%	<0.5%	11%	6%	2%	5%	10%	5%	11%	<0.5%	<0.5%	3%	<0.5%	N/A
Cable TV/HKUPOP	370	6–10 Aug 2012	13%	4%	11% 2 seats	<0.5%	4%	2%	2%	<0.5%	10%	4%	1%	3%	7%	5%	6%	<0.5%	<0.5%	4%	<0.5%	25%
now TV/HKUPOP	280	6–10 Aug 2012	15%	5%	17% 2 seats	<0.5%	6%	3%	2%	<0.5%	13%	5%	2%	4%	9%	7%	8%	<0.5%	<0.5%	5%	<0.5%	N/A
now TV/HKUPOP	259	5–9 Aug 2012	17%	5%	15%	<0.5%	6%	2%	3%	<0.5%	14%	4%	2%	2%	10%	6%	9%	<0.5%	1%	4%	<0.5%	N/A
Cable TV/HKUPOP	351	5–9 Aug 2012	13%	4%	11% 2 seats	<0.5%	4%	2%	2%	<0.5%	10%	3%	2%	2%	7%	5%	7%	<0.5%	<0.5%	3%	<0.5%	26%
Cable TV/HKUPOP	347	4–8 Aug 2012	13%	4%	9%	<0.5%	4%	2%	1%	<0.5%	9%	3%	1%	2%	7%	5%	9%	<0.5%	1%	2%	<0.5%	26%
now TV/HKUPOP	unknown	4–8 Aug 2012	18%	5%	12%	<0.5%	6%	3%	2%	<0.5%	13%	5%	1%	2%	10%	7%	12%	<0.5%	1%	3%	<0.5%	N/A
now TV/HKUPOP	unknown	3–7 Aug 2012	19%	5%	11%	<0.5%	7%	4%	2%	<0.5%	13%	4%	1%	3%	9%	6%	12%	<0.5%	1%	3%	<0.5%	N/A
Cable TV/HKUPOP	332	3–7 Aug 2012	14%	4%	8%	<0.5%	5%	3%	1%	<0.5%	9%	3%	1%	2%	6%	4%	9%	<0.5%	1%	2%	<0.5%	30%
Cable TV/HKUPOP	323	2–6 Aug 2012	11%	4%	8%	<0.5%	4%	4%	1%	<0.5%	8%	4%	1%	1%	8%	4%	8%	<0.5%	1%	3%	<0.5%	30%
Cable TV/HKUPOP	312	1–5 Aug 2012	9%	4%	6%	<0.5%	3%	4%	2%	<0.5%	9%	5%	<0.5%	1%	8%	4%	9%	<0.5%	1%	2%	<0.5%	31%
now TV/HKUPOP	1,266	1–5 Aug 2012	13%	5%	9%	<0.5%	5%	6%	3%	<0.5%	13%	7%	1%	2%	11%	5%	13%	<0.5%	1%	3%	<0.5%	N/A
HKRA	2,018	12–21 Jul 2012	11.7%	1.9%	7.5%	N/A	2.8%	5.0%	3.3%	0.9%	8.8%	2.3%	1.5%	2.0%	8.9%	2.2%	4.9%	N/A	N/A	3.4%	N/A	26.2%

=== New Territories West ===
Key: Pro-democrats secured; Pro-Beijing secured.

List No.			1	2	3	4	5	6	7	8	9	10	11	12	13	14	15	16	Undecided/ Don't know/ Won't vote
Poll source	Sample size	Dates administered	CC Leung (DAB)	MK Mak (FTU)	SY Chan (DP)	WY Chan (PP)	IS Mak (DA)	Tsang (LSD)	Kwok (Civic)	Tien (NPP)	Ho	YW Chan (Ind)	YC Leung (NWSC)	HP Chan (DAB)	K Chan (TF)	WT Lee (DP)	CY Lee (Lab)	Tam (DAB)	Undecided/ Don't know/ Won't vote
Election result		9 Sep 2012	6.8%	7.1%	5.2%	8.9%	0.6%	1.9%	14.5%	7.6%	2.2%	2.4%	8.6%	7.4%	3.4%	6.6%	8.2%	8.7%	N/A
Cable TV/HKUPOP	960	3–7 Sep 2012	3%	4%	3%	4%	<0.5%	1%	9%	5%	1%	1%	4%	3%	1%	5%	6%	7%	44%
now TV/HKUPOP	541	3–7 Sep 2012	5%	7%	5%	8%	<0.5%	2%	15%	9%	2%	3%	7%	5%	2%	8%	10%	11%	N/A
now TV/HKUPOP	533	2–6 Sep 2012	4%	7%	5%	7%	1%	2%	16%	9%	3%	3%	8%	4%	1%	8%	10%	12%	N/A
Cable TV/HKUPOP	915	2–6 Sep 2012	2%	4%	3%	4%	<0.5%	1%	9%	5%	2%	2%	5%	2%	1%	5%	6%	7%	41%
Cable TV/HKUPOP	901	1–5 Sep 2012	2%	4%	3%	4%	1%	1%	9%	5%	2%	2%	6%	2%	1%	5%	6%	7%	41%
now TV/HKUPOP	524	31 Aug–4 Sep 2012	4%	6%	6%	7%	1%	1%	15%	8%	3%	3%	11%	4%	1%	8%	10%	13%	N/A
Cable TV/HKUPOP	890	31 Aug–4 Sep 2012	2%	3%	4%	4%	<0.5%	1%	9%	4%	2%	2%	6%	2%	1%	5%	6%	8%	41%
Cable TV/HKUPOP	858	30 Aug–3 Sep 2012	2%	3%	3%	5%	1%	1%	8%	5%	2%	1%	6%	2%	<0.5%	5%	6%	8%	41%
now TV/HKUPOP	503	30 Aug–3 Sep 2012	4%	5%	6%	8%	1%	1%	13%	9%	3%	2%	11%	4%	1%	8%	10%	14%	N/A
now TV/HKUPOP	458	29 Aug–2 Sep 2012	4%	4%	6%	8%	1%	1%	14%	9%	3%	3%	10%	4%	1%	8%	10%	14%	N/A
Cable TV/HKUPOP	785	29 Aug–2 Sep 2012	2%	3%	3%	5%	1%	1%	8%	5%	2%	2%	6%	2%	<0.5%	5%	6%	8%	42%
Cable TV/HKUPOP	764	28 Aug–1 Sep 2012	2%	3%	3%	5%	1%	1%	8%	6%	1%	2%	6%	3%	1%	4%	6%	8%	42%
now TV/HKUPOP	444	28 Aug–1 Sep 2012	3%	5%	5%	9%	1%	1%	13%	10%	2%	3%	10%	5%	1%	7%	10%	14%	N/A
now TV/HKUPOP	413	27–31 Aug 2012	4%	5%	4%	9%	1%	1%	14%	12%	2%	2%	9%	4%	1%	7%	10%	14%	N/A
Cable TV/HKUPOP	739	27–31 Aug 2012	2%	3%	2%	5%	1%	1%	8%	7%	1%	1%	5%	2%	1%	4%	6%	8%	45%
Cable TV/HKUPOP	681	26–30 Aug 2012	2%	3%	2%	5%	1%	1%	8%	8%	1%	1%	6%	2%	1%	4%	5%	8%	44%
now TV/HKUPOP	390	26–30 Aug 2012	3%	5%	3%	9%	1%	1%	14%	13%	1%	2%	10%	4%	2%	8%	9%	14%	N/A
now TV/HKUPOP	373	25–29 Aug 2012	2%	5%	5%	9%	1%	2%	15%	11%	1%	3%	11%	4%	1%	7%	7%	15%	N/A
Cable TV/HKUPOP	629	25–29 Aug 2012	1%	3%	3%	5%	1%	1%	9%	7%	<0.5%	2%	7%	2%	1%	4%	4%	9%	41%
Cable TV/HKUPOP	597	24–28 Aug 2012	1%	3%	2%	5%	1%	1%	9%	8%	<0.5%	1%	7%	3%	1%	5%	4%	9%	41%
now TV/HKUPOP	356	24–28 Aug 2012	2%	6%	4%	9%	1%	2%	14%	13%	1%	2%	12%	4%	1%	8%	6%	15%	N/A
now TV/HKUPOP	314	23–27 Aug 2012	3%	5%	3%	10%	1%	2%	15%	13%	1%	1%	10%	5%	<0.5%	7%	7%	16% 2 seats	N/A
Cable TV/HKUPOP	563	23–27 Aug 2012	2%	3%	2%	6%	1%	1%	9%	8%	<0.5%	1%	6%	3%	<0.5%	4%	4%	9% 2 seats	42%
Cable TV/HKUPOP	525	22–26 Aug 2012	2%	4%	2%	5%	1%	2%	8%	7%	<0.5%	1%	8%	2%	<0.5%	4%	4%	10% 2 seats	40%
now TV/HKUPOP	314	22–26 Aug 2012	4%	6%	3%	9%	1%	3%	14%	11%	1%	2%	13%	4%	<0.5%	6%	7%	17% 2 seats	N/A
now TV/HKUPOP	307	21–25 Aug 2012	4%	6%	3%	8%	1%	3%	15%	10%	1%	2%	13%	4%	<0.5%	5%	8%	16% 2 seats	N/A
Cable TV/HKUPOP	523	21–25 Aug 2012	3%	4%	2%	5%	1%	2%	9%	6%	<0.5%	1%	8%	2%	<0.5%	3%	5%	10% 2 seats	41%
Cable TV/HKUPOP	507	20–24 Aug 2012	3%	4%	2%	4%	<0.5%	2%	9%	6%	1%	1%	7%	2%	1%	4%	6%	8%	41%
now TV/HKUPOP	299	20–24 Aug 2012	4%	6%	3%	8%	1%	3%	15%	10%	2%	1%	12%	3%	1%	7%	11%	13%	N/A
now TV/HKUPOP	321	19–23 Aug 2012	4%	6%	3%	8%	1%	2%	15%	9%	1%	1%	15%	3%	1%	6%	11%	14%	N/A
Cable TV/HKUPOP	514	19–23 Aug 2012	3%	4%	2%	5%	<0.5%	1%	9%	6%	1%	1%	9%	2%	1%	4%	7%	9%	38%
Cable TV/HKUPOP	511	18–22 Aug 2012	3%	4%	1%	5%	1%	2%	7%	5%	1%	<0.5%	10%	2%	1%	4%	7%	10%	37%
now TV/HKUPOP	321	18–22 Aug 2012	6%	5%	2%	8%	1%	2%	12%	9%	1%	<0.5%	15%	2%	1%	7%	11%	16%	N/A
now TV/HKUPOP	318	17–21 Aug 2012	5%	5%	3%	8%	1%	2%	13%	8%	2%	<0.5%	12%	3%	2%	8%	11%	16%	N/A
Cable TV/HKUPOP	510	17–21 Aug 2012	3%	3%	2%	5%	1%	1%	8%	5%	1%	<0.5%	8%	2%	1%	5%	7%	10%	37%
Cable TV/HKUPOP	491	16–20 Aug 2012	3%	4%	3%	5%	1%	2%	9%	5%	1%	<0.5%	8%	2%	1%	6%	5%	10% 2 seats	36%
now TV/HKUPOP	313	16–20 Aug 2012	4%	6%	4%	8%	1%	3%	14%	7%	2%	<0.5%	12%	4%	1%	9%	9%	16% 2 seats	N/A
now TV/HKUPOP	310	15–19 Aug 2012	5%	6%	4%	10%	1%	2%	15%	7%	1%	<0.5%	13%	4%	1%	8%	6%	18% 2 seats	N/A
Cable TV/HKUPOP	489	15–19 Aug 2012	3%	4%	3%	6%	<0.5%	1%	9%	4%	1%	<0.5%	8%	2%	1%	5%	4%	12% 2 seats	36%
Cable TV/HKUPOP	482	14–18 Aug 2012	3%	3%	3%	5%	1%	1%	9%	4%	1%	<0.5%	8%	3%	1%	5%	4%	10% 2 seats	37%
now TV/HKUPOP	287	14–18 Aug 2012	5%	6%	5%	9%	1%	2%	15%	7%	2%	<0.5%	12%	4%	1%	8%	6%	17% 2 seats	N/A
now TV/HKUPOP	287	13–17 Aug 2012	5%	5%	6%	8%	<0.5%	1%	18% 2 seats	6%	1%	<0.5%	14%	3%	1%	8%	7%	16%	N/A
Cable TV/HKUPOP	459	13–17 Aug 2012	3%	3%	3%	5%	<0.5%	1%	11% 2 seats	4%	1%	<0.5%	8%	2%	<0.5%	5%	4%	10%	38%
Cable TV/HKUPOP	458	12–16 Aug 2012	3%	4%	4%	6%	<0.5%	<0.5%	12% 2 seats	3%	1%	<0.5%	10%	2%	<0.5%	5%	5%	11% 2 seats	36%
now TV/HKUPOP	295	12–16 Aug 2012	4%	6%	5%	9%	<0.5%	1%	18% 2 seats	5%	2%	<0.5%	15%	2%	<0.5%	7%	6%	17% 2 seats	N/A
now TV/HKUPOP	313	11–15 Aug 2012	4%	5%	6%	9%	1%	<0.5%	16%	8%	2%	<0.5%	15%	2%	<0.5%	7%	7%	17% 2 seats	N/A
Cable TV/HKUPOP	417	11–15 Aug 2012	2%	4%	4%	6%	<0.5%	<0.5%	11%	6%	1%	<0.5%	10%	2%	<0.5%	5%	5%	11% 2 seats	34%
Cable TV/HKUPOP	417	10–14 Aug 2012	3%	4%	4%	6%	1%	<0.5%	11%	6%	1%	<0.5%	11%	3%	<0.5%	5%	6%	13% 2 seats	27%
now TV/HKUPOP	304	10–14 Aug 2012	4%	5%	6%	8%	1%	<0.5%	15%	9%	1%	<0.5%	15%	4%	<0.5%	7%	8%	18% 2 seats	N/A
now TV/HKUPOP	295	9–13 Aug 2012	4%	5%	4%	8%	1%	1%	16%	7%	1%	<0.5%	14%	4%	<0.5%	7%	8%	21% 2 seats	N/A
Cable TV/HKUPOP	394	9–13 Aug 2012	3%	4%	3%	6%	1%	1%	12%	5%	1%	<0.5%	10%	3%	<0.5%	5%	6%	16% 2 seats	23%
Cable TV/HKUPOP	390	8–12 Aug 2012	3%	4%	3%	5%	<0.5%	1%	12%	7%	1%	<0.5%	10%	3%	<0.5%	5%	6%	15% 2 seats	24%
now TV/HKUPOP	295	8–12 Aug 2012	4%	5%	4%	7%	<0.5%	1%	16%	10%	1%	<0.5%	14%	4%	<0.5%	7%	8%	20% 2 seats	N/A
now TV/HKUPOP	295	7–11 Aug 2012	5%	6%	3%	7%	<0.5%	2%	14%	11%	1%	1%	13%	3%	<0.5%	6%	6%	21% 2 seats	N/A
Cable TV/HKUPOP	365	6–10 Aug 2012	4%	4%	1%	5%	<0.5%	1%	11%	7%	1%	<0.5%	11%	3%	<0.5%	5%	7%	17% 2 seats	23%
now TV/HKUPOP	283	6–10 Aug 2012	5%	6%	2%	6%	<0.5%	2%	14%	9%	1%	1%	14%	4%	<0.5%	6%	8%	23% 2 seats	N/A
now TV/HKUPOP	275	5–9 Aug 2012	4%	6%	1%	6%	<0.5%	2%	17% 2 seats	9%	2%	1%	13%	2%	<0.5%	5%	8%	22% 2 seats	N/A
Cable TV/HKUPOP	359	5–9 Aug 2012	3%	5%	1%	5%	<0.5%	1%	13% 2 seats	7%	1%	1%	10%	2%	<0.5%	4%	6%	17% 2 seats	23%
Cable TV/HKUPOP	348	4–8 Aug 2012	3%	5%	1%	5%	<0.5%	1%	11%	9%	1%	1%	9%	2%	<0.5%	4%	7%	16% 2 seats	25%
now TV/HKUPOP	unknown	4–8 Aug 2012	4%	6%	1%	6%	<0.5%	2%	15%	12%	1%	2%	12%	2%	<0.5%	5%	9%	21% 2 seats	N/A
now TV/HKUPOP	unknown	3–7 Aug 2012	3%	8%	1%	8%	<0.5%	2%	16%	9%	1%	1%	11%	2%	<0.5%	5%	8%	23% 2 seats	N/A
Cable TV/HKUPOP	330	3–7 Aug 2012	2%	6%	1%	6%	<0.5%	1%	11%	7%	1%	1%	8%	2%	<0.5%	4%	6%	16% 2 seats	28%
Cable TV/HKUPOP	300	2–6 Aug 2012	1%	6%	2%	6%	<0.5%	<0.5%	12%	7%	1%	1%	8%	2%	<0.5%	5%	7%	17% 2 seats	27%
Cable TV/HKUPOP	289	1–5 Aug 2012	1%	7%	2%	7%	<0.5%	<0.5%	10%	6%	1%	1%	8%	1%	<0.5%	5%	6%	15% 2 seats	30%
now TV/HKUPOP	1,266	1–5 Aug 2012	1%	9%	3%	10%	<0.5%	1%	14%	9%	1%	1%	12%	2%	<0.5%	7%	9%	21% 2 seats	N/A
HKRA	2,018	12–21 Jul 2012	3.1%	3.0%	1.0%	5.0%	0.7%	0.8%	6.2%	13.3%	1.4%	N/A	4.7%	1.2%	0.9%	4.1%	7.5%	16.2% 2 seats	26.7%

=== District Council (Second) ===
This chart presents detailed opinion polling for the 2012 Hong Kong legislative election in District Council (Second).

Key: Pro-democrats secured; Pro-Beijing secured.

Poll source	Sample size	Dates administered	Ho (DP)	To (DP)	Peck (Ind)	Lau (DAB)	Fung (ADPL)	Lee (DAB)	Chan (FTU)	Undecided/Don't know/Won't vote
Election result		9 Sep 2012	14.4%	19.9%	3.9%	12.6%	16.5%	17.4%	15.5%	N/A
Cable TV/HKUPOP	3,208	3–7 Sep 2012	9%	11%	3%	7%	9%	8%	12%	41%
now TV/HKUPOP	1,868	3–7 Sep 2012	16%	19%	5%	11%	16%	14%	20%	N/A
now TV/HKUPOP	1,760	2–6 Sep 2012	17%	18%	4%	11%	16%	13%	21%	N/A
Cable TV/HKUPOP	2,998	2–6 Sep 2012	10%	10%	3%	7%	10%	8%	12%	42%
Cable TV/HKUPOP	2,935	1–5 Sep 2012	10%	10%	2%	6%	10%	7%	13%	41%
now TV/HKUPOP	1,713	31 Aug–4 Sep 2012	18%	16%	4%	11%	17%	12%	22%	N/A
Cable TV/HKUPOP	2,868	31 Aug–4 Sep 2012	11%	10%	2%	6%	10%	7%	13%	40%
Cable TV/HKUPOP	2,821	30 Aug–3 Sep 2012	11%	9%	2%	7%	10%	7%	13%	41%
now TV/HKUPOP	1,664	30 Aug–3 Sep 2012	19%	15%	4%	11%	17%	11%	22%	N/A
now TV/HKUPOP	1,582	29 Aug–2 Sep 2012	20%	13%	4%	11%	17%	11%	23%	N/A
Cable TV/HKUPOP	2,679	29 Aug–2 Sep 2012	12%	8%	2%	7%	10%	6%	14%	41%
Cable TV/HKUPOP	2,599	28 Aug–1 Sep 2012	11%	8%	2%	7%	10%	7%	14%	42%
now TV/HKUPOP	1,523	28 Aug–1 Sep 2012	19%	13%	4%	12%	17%	11%	24%	N/A
now TV/HKUPOP	1,476	27–31 Aug 2012	19%	14%	4%	12%	16%	12%	23%	N/A
Cable TV/HKUPOP	2,599	27–31 Aug 2012	11%	8%	2%	7%	9%	7%	13%	42%
Cable TV/HKUPOP	2,343	26–30 Aug 2012	11%	7%	2%	7%	9%	7%	14%	42%
now TV/HKUPOP	1,362	26–30 Aug 2012	19%	13%	4%	12%	16%	12%	24%	N/A
now TV/HKUPOP	1,254	25–29 Aug 2012	19%	13%	4%	12%	15%	13%	24%	N/A
Cable TV/HKUPOP	2,157	25–29 Aug 2012	11%	7%	3%	7%	9%	8%	14%	42%
Cable TV/HKUPOP	2,042	24–28 Aug 2012	10%	8%	3%	7%	8%	8%	15%	41%
now TV/HKUPOP	1,193	24–28 Aug 2012	18%	13%	5%	11%	14%	13%	25%	N/A
now TV/HKUPOP	1,143	23–27 Aug 2012	17%	13%	6%	12%	13%	13%	26%	N/A
Cable TV/HKUPOP	1,967	23–27 Aug 2012	10%	8%	3%	7%	8%	7%	15%	42%
Cable TV/HKUPOP	1,868	22–26 Aug 2012	10%	8%	4%	7%	7%	7%	16%	41%
now TV/HKUPOP	1,085	22–26 Aug 2012	17%	13%	7%	11%	13%	12%	27%	N/A
now TV/HKUPOP	1,098	21–25 Aug 2012	17%	13%	7%	11%	13%	11%	27%	N/A
Cable TV/HKUPOP	1,887	21–25 Aug 2012	10%	8%	4%	7%	7%	7%	16%	42%
Cable TV/HKUPOP	1,848	20–24 Aug 2012	10%	8%	4%	7%	8%	6%	17%	40%
now TV/HKUPOP	1,100	20–24 Aug 2012	17%	14%	6%	12%	13%	11%	28%	N/A
now TV/HKUPOP	1,121	19–23 Aug 2012	17%	15%	6%	12%	14%	11%	27%	N/A
Cable TV/HKUPOP	1,829	19–23 Aug 2012	11%	9%	3%	7%	8%	7%	16%	39%
Cable TV/HKUPOP	1,773	18–22 Aug 2012	12%	9%	3%	7%	9%	7%	17%	36%
now TV/HKUPOP	1,136	18–22 Aug 2012	19%	15%	5%	11%	14%	10%	27%	N/A
now TV/HKUPOP	1,124	17–21 Aug 2012	19%	15%	5%	11%	14%	10%	27%	N/A
Cable TV/HKUPOP	1,724	17–21 Aug 2012	12%	10%	3%	7%	9%	6%	17%	34%
Cable TV/HKUPOP	1,625	16–20 Aug 2012	12%	10%	3%	8%	9%	7%	17%	34%
now TV/HKUPOP	1,073	16–20 Aug 2012	19%	15%	5%	12%	13%	10%	26%	N/A
now TV/HKUPOP	1,056	15–19 Aug 2012	19%	17%	4%	11%	13%	10%	25%	N/A
Cable TV/HKUPOP	1,622	15–19 Aug 2012	13%	11%	3%	7%	8%	6%	16%	36%
Cable TV/HKUPOP	1,621	14–18 Aug 2012	12%	11%	3%	7%	9%	7%	16%	36%
now TV/HKUPOP	1,057	14–18 Aug 2012	19%	16%	5%	11%	14%	11%	24%	N/A
now TV/HKUPOP	1,045	13–17 Aug 2012	19%	16%	5%	12%	14%	11%	24%	N/A
Cable TV/HKUPOP	1,598	13–17 Aug 2012	13%	10%	3%	8%	9%	7%	16%	35%
Cable TV/HKUPOP	1,609	12–16 Aug 2012	12%	10%	3%	8%	8%	7%	17%	34%
now TV/HKUPOP	1,053	12–16 Aug 2012	19%	15%	5%	12%	13%	11%	25%	N/A
now TV/HKUPOP	1,112	11–15 Aug 2012	20%	16%	5%	12%	12%	11%	25%	N/A
Cable TV/HKUPOP	1,658	11–15 Aug 2012	13%	10%	3%	8%	8%	7%	16%	34%
Cable TV/HKUPOP	1,496	10–14 Aug 2012	15%	11%	4%	10%	8%	8%	18%	25%
now TV/HKUPOP	1,112	10–14 Aug 2012	20%	15%	5%	13%	11%	11%	25%	N/A
now TV/HKUPOP	1,083	9–13 Aug 2012	20%	16%	6%	13%	11%	10%	24%	N/A
Cable TV/HKUPOP	1,437	9–13 Aug 2012	15%	12%	4%	10%	8%	8%	18%	24%
Cable TV/HKUPOP	1,411	8–12 Aug 2012	16%	10%	5%	11%	8%	8%	19%	24%
now TV/HKUPOP	1,073	8–12 Aug 2012	21%	15%	6%	13%	11%	10%	25%	N/A
now TV/HKUPOP	1,044	7–11 Aug 2012	21%	15%	5%	13%	11%	11%	24%	N/A
Cable TV/HKUPOP	1,311	6–10 Aug 2012	15%	10%	4%	11%	9%	9%	18%	23%
now TV/HKUPOP	1,002	6–10 Aug 2012	20%	14%	5%	14%	12%	11%	24%	N/A
now TV/HKUPOP	939	5–9 Aug 2012	20%	14%	5%	13%	12%	12%	24%	N/A
Cable TV/HKUPOP	1,251	5–9 Aug 2012	15%	11%	4%	10%	9%	9%	18%	25%
Cable TV/HKUPOP	1,211	4–8 Aug 2012	15%	11%	3%	10%	9%	9%	19%	25%
now TV/HKUPOP	unknown	4–8 Aug 2012	20%	15%	4%	13%	12%	12%	25%	N/A
now TV/HKUPOP	unknown	3–7 Aug 2012	20%	15%	4%	13%	12%	12%	24%	N/A
Cable TV/HKUPOP	1,172	3–7 Aug 2012	15%	11%	3%	10%	8%	9%	18%	28%
Cable TV/HKUPOP	1,137	2–6 Aug 2012	15%	10%	3%	9%	8%	7%	18%	30%
Cable TV/HKUPOP	971	1–5 Aug 2012	16%	10%	3%	9%	7%	7%	18%	30%
HKRA	2,018	12–21 July 2012	16.3%	4.5%	N/A	6.0%	3.6%	9.9%	12.2%	36.2%

== See also ==
- Opinion polling for the Hong Kong legislative election, 2008
- Opinion polling for the Hong Kong legislative election, 2016
