= HKMA =

HKMA may stand for:

- Hong Kong Monetary Authority
- Hong Kong Medical Association
