= David Lam (doctor) =

Hong Kong surgeon and politician

- 林哲玄
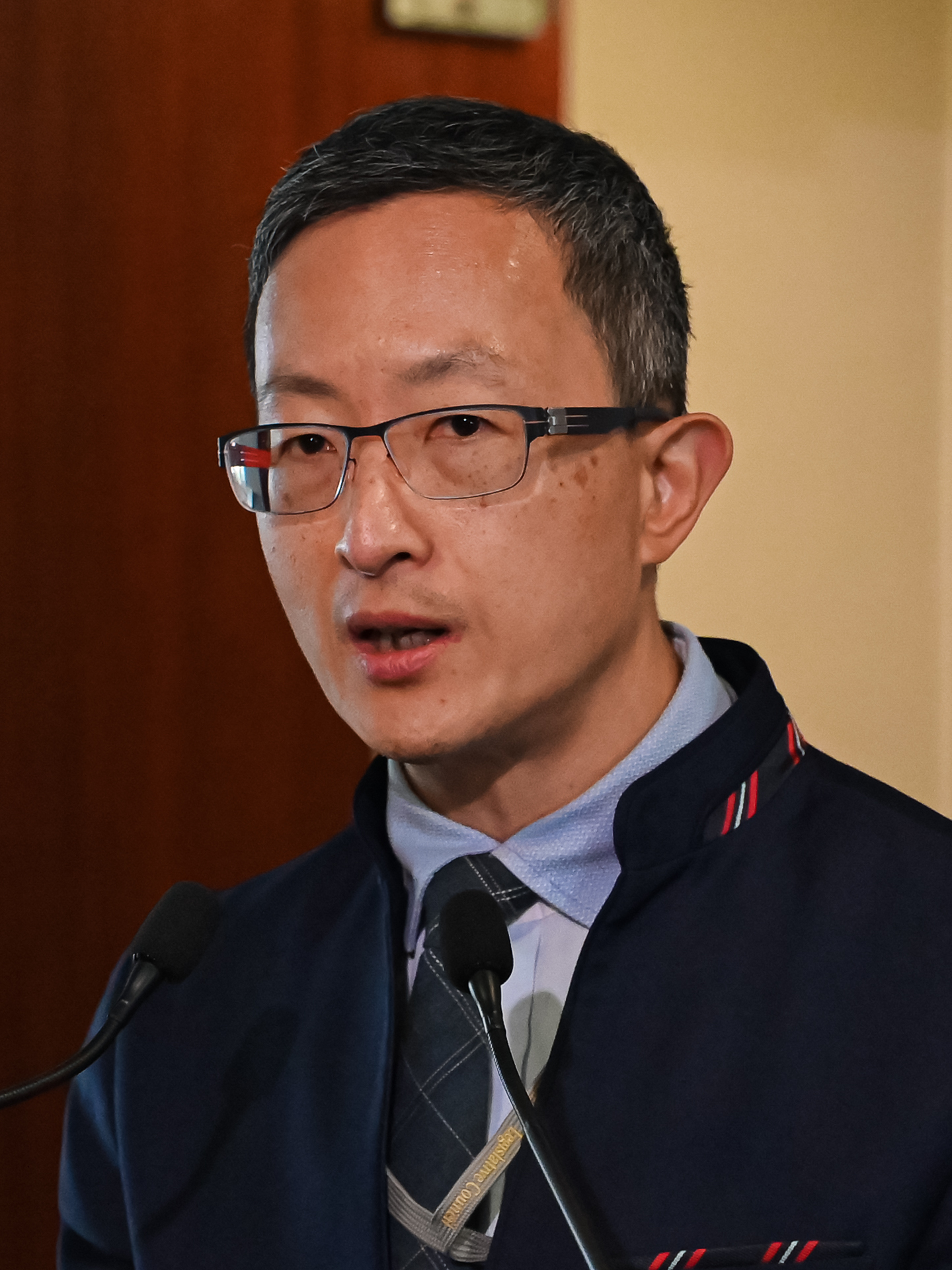
- Lam in 2023

Member of the Legislative Council
- Incumbent
- Assumed office 1 January 2022
- Preceded by: Pierre Chan (Medical); Joseph Lee (Health Services)
- Constituency: Medical and Health Services

Personal details
- Born: 1966 (age 59–60)
- Citizenship: Chinese (Hong Kong)
- Occupation: Surgeon

David Lam Tzit-yuen (Chinese: 林哲玄, born 1966) is a Hong Kong surgeon and politician who is currently a Legislative Council member for Medical and Health Services constituency. He was elected in 2021 and re-elected in 2025.

== Biography ==
In September 2022, Lam was removed of his status of being an international Fellow of the American College of Surgeons due to Lam being a national of China, saying "The American College of Surgeons regrets to inform you that it is not able to continue offering Fellowship or other membership status to residents of the People's Republic of China. Unfortunately, your status as an international Fellow falls into this situation. We are being advised to take this step to avoid issues with the PRC laws governing the operation of foreign organizations in the PRC." Lam said that his membership status had no actual use, and that he would save approximately US$200 per year on membership fees. Lam also criticized the organization, saying "It is utmost hypocrisy to sugarcoat sanctions as complying with the laws. It's time to draw a clear boundary." Later, his membership eligibility was reinstated.

On 27 December 2022, Lam said that Hong Kong should still isolate people with COVID-19 and should still impose PCR tests on inbound arrivals, saying "If we do not test them at the border, that means no test, which is a bit hazardous." However, Lam said that those coming from mainland China should be exempt from the PCR test at the border. On 28 December 2022, against Lam's opinion, the government announced that PCR tests for inbound arrivals would no longer be required.

== Electoral history ==
2021 legislative election: Medical and Health Services
Party	Candidate	Votes	%	±%
Independent	David Lam Tzit-yuen	5,511	34.7	N/A
DAB	Chan Wing-kwong	3,446	21.7	N/A
Independent	Scarlett Pong Oi-lan	2,719	17.1	N/A
Independent	Chan Chi-chung	2,585	16.3	N/A
Independent	Ho Sung-hon	1,631	10.3	N/A

Legislative Council of Hong Kong
Preceded by Pierre Chan (Medical); Joseph Lee (Health Services)	Member of Legislative Council; Representative for Medical and Health Services; 2022–present	Incumbent
