= Chiu Hin-kwong =

Hong Kong doctor (1928–2024)

Chiu Hin-kwong OBE, JP
- 招顯洸

Unofficial Member of the Executive Council of Hong Kong
- In office 1 September 1986 – 31 October 1988
- Appointed by: Sir Edward Youde
- Succeeded by: Cheng Hon-kwan

Unofficial Member of the Legislative Council of Hong Kong
- In office 30 October 1985 – 25 August 1988
- Preceded by: New constituency
- Succeeded by: Leong Che-hung
- Constituency: Medical

Personal details
- Born: 23 May 1928 British Hong Kong
- Died: 30 June 2024 (aged 96)
- Spouse: Peggy Chiu Leung
- Children: 3
- Education: King's College; Lingnan Middle School; Pui Ching & Pui To Middle School; University of Hong Kong (MBBS)
- Occupation: Doctor

Chiu Hin-kwong (Chinese: 招顯洸; 23 May 1928 – 30 June 2024) was a Hong Kong doctor. He was also a member of the Executive Council and Legislative Council of Hong Kong.

== Life and career ==
Chiu was born in Hong Kong on 23 May 1928. He studied at the King's College, Hong Kong and moved to China during the Japanese occupation of Hong Kong and was educated at the Lingnan Middle School in Guangdong and Pui Ching & Pui To Middle School in Guilin. He returned to Hong Kong after war and graduated with the Bachelor of Medicine, Bachelor of Surgery from the University of Hong Kong in 1953. He became a doctor in private practice and was a fellow of the Hong Kong College of General Practitioners.

He had been vice-president of the Hong Kong Medical Association and member of the Licentiate Committee of the Medical Council and Dental Council of Hong Kong. He was also council member of the Hong Kong branch of the British Medical Association and director of the Hong Kong Baptist Hospital.

Chiu was elected to the Legislative Council through the Medical functional constituency in 1985 and was appointed to the Executive Council by Governor Edward Youde in 1986 with Daniel Tse.

He lost his seat in the 1988 election to Dr Leong Che-hung.

Chiu died on 30 June 2024, at the age of 96.
