= Pierre Chan =

Hong Kong doctor and politician (born 1976)

The Honourable Pierre Chan Pui-yin
- 陳沛然
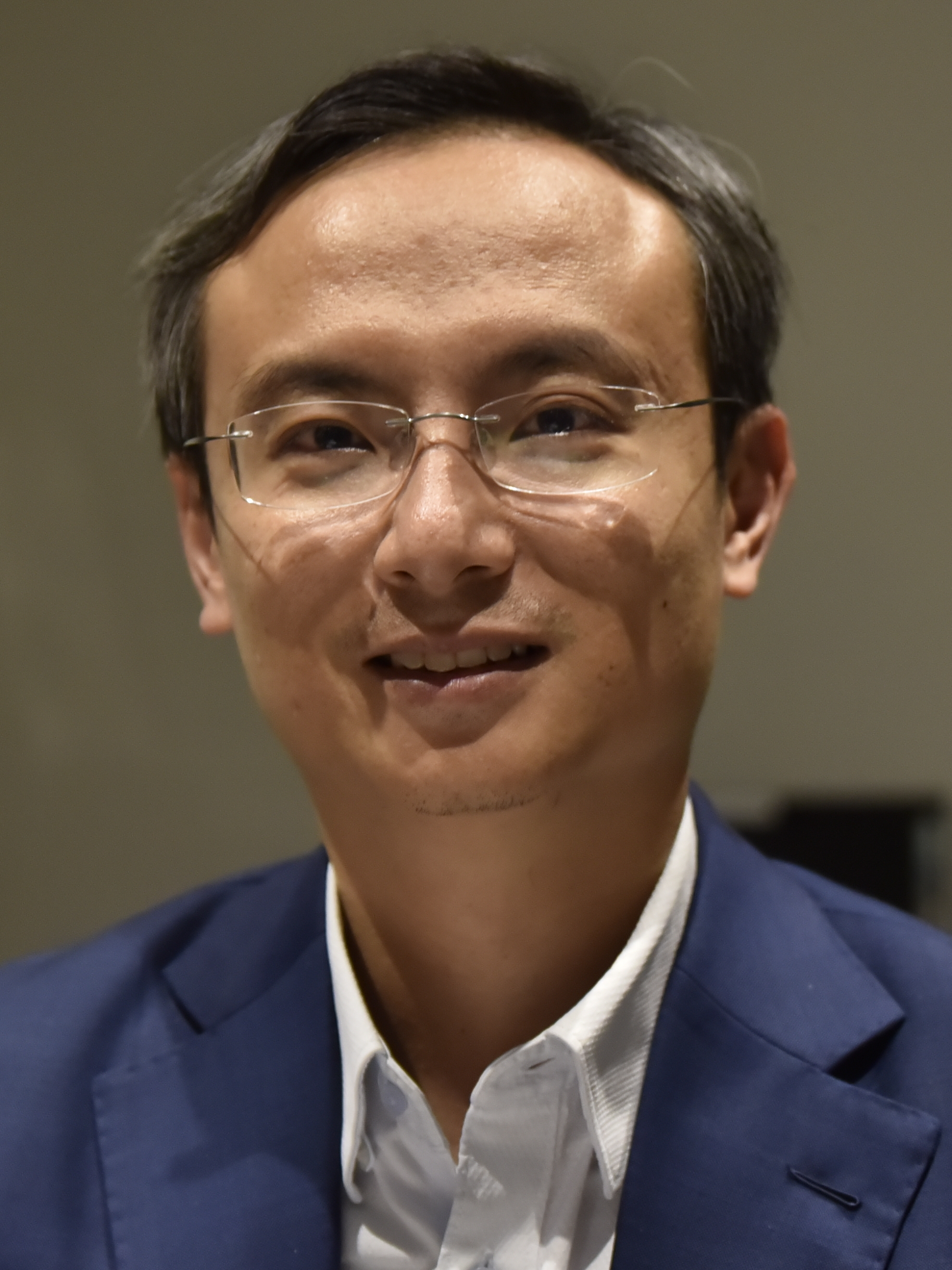
- Chan in 2018

Member of the Legislative Council
- In office 1 October 2016 – 31 December 2021
- Preceded by: Leung Ka-lau
- Succeeded by: David Lam (Medical and Health Services)
- Constituency: Medical

Personal details
- Born: 18 August 1976 (age 50) Hong Kong
- Children: 3
- Education: University of Hong Kong
- Profession: Doctor

Pierre Chan
- Traditional Chinese: 陳沛然
Transcriptions
Yue: Cantonese
- Yale Romanization: Chàhn Pui yìhn
- Jyutping: Can4 Pui3 jin4
- Sidney Lau: Chan4 Pooi3 Yin4

Pierre Chan Pui-yin (born 18 August 1976) is a Hong Kong medical doctor and politician. Chan was elected in the 2016 Hong Kong Legislative Council election through the Medical functional constituency.

== Early life ==
Chan was born in Hong Kong in 1976.

== Education ==
In 2000, Chan graduated with a medical degree from the University of Hong Kong.

== Career ==
In 2001, Chan started his career at the Queen Mary Hospital until 2010. Chan joined Ruttonjee Hospital as an associate consultant of gastroenterology and hepatology.

In 2014, Chan became president of the doctors' union, the Hong Kong Public Doctors' Association, until 2016. In 2014, Chan was appointed by the government to several public boards, including the Steering Committee on Review of the Hospital Authority until 2015. In 2016, Chan became a member of the Medical Council of Hong Kong.

He was elected in the 2016 Hong Kong Legislative Council election through the Medical functional constituency.

As a legislator, Chan did not align with either of the two main political groupings. He remained in office when, in November 2020, almost all pro-democracy Legislative Councillors resigned in protest at the disqualification of four of their number under the new national security law, but voted against the subsequent introduction of a heavily restrictive "patriots-only" election process. Following those changes, Chan declined to stand again and returned to his gastroenterology practice in a public hospital.

Legislative Council of Hong Kong
Preceded by Leung Ka-lau	Member of Legislative Council; Representative for Medical; 2016–2021	Succeeded by David Lam (Medical and Health Services)
Order of precedence
Preceded by Yung Hoi-yan; Member of the Legislative Council	Hong Kong order of precedence Member of the Legislative Council	Succeeded by Chan Chun-ying; Member of the Legislative Council
