= Edward Leong =

Hong Kong politician

The Honourable Edward Leong GBM GBS OBE JP
- 梁智鴻
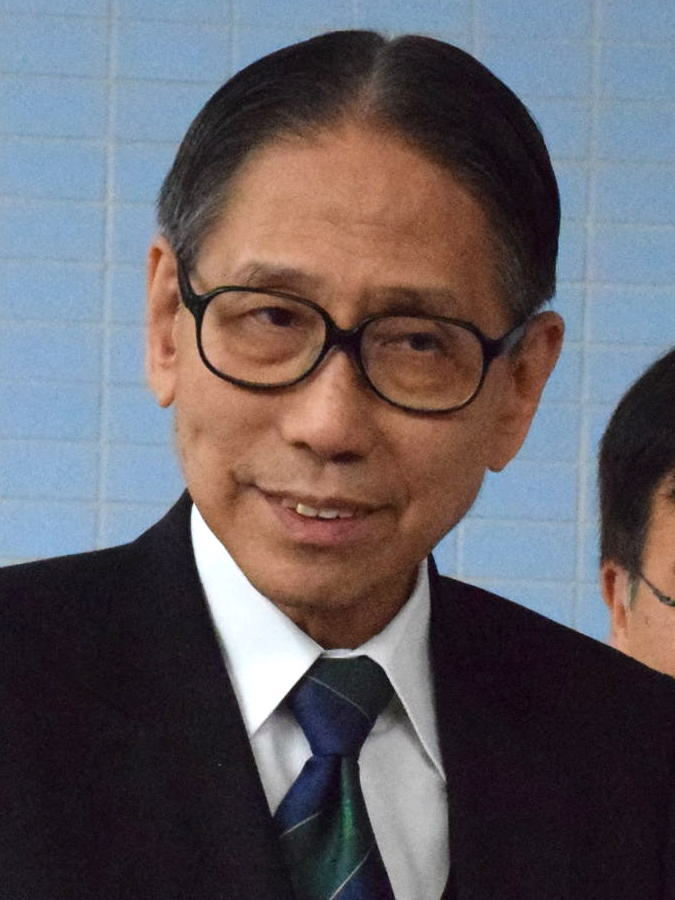
- Leong in 2015 as the chairman of the Council of the University of Hong Kong

Member of the Executive Council
- In office 1 November 2005 – 30 June 2012
- Appointed by: Donald Tsang

Member of the Legislative Council
- In office 22 September 1988 – 10 September 2000
- Preceded by: Chiu Hin-kwong
- Succeeded by: Lo Wing-lok
- Constituency: Medical
- In office 25 January 1997 – 30 June 1998 (Provisional Legislative Council)

Chairman of the Hospital Authority
- In office 1 October 2002 – 8 July 2004
- Preceded by: Lo Ka-shui
- Succeeded by: Anthony Wu

Personal details
- Born: 23 April 1939 (age 87) Hong Kong
- Party: Democratic Foundation (1989–92); Meeting Point (1992–94)
- Spouse: Lilian Leong Fung Ling-yee
- Education: Queen's College; St. Joseph's College
- Alma mater: University of Hong Kong (MBBS)
- Occupation: Medical doctor

Edward Leong Che-hung GBM GBS OBE JP (Chinese: 梁智鴻, born 23 April 1939) is a Hong Kong physician and politician who served as a non-official member of the Executive Council of Hong Kong from 2005 to 2012. He previously represented the medical functional constituency in the Legislative Council from 1988 to 2000, and was Chairman of the Council of the University of Hong Kong from 2009 to 2015.

== Early life and education ==
Leong was born in British Hong Kong to a family of doctors in 1939 and spent his childhood in the Yau Ma Tei neighbourhood of Kowloon, growing up in a subdivided flat on Hak Po Street. Leong briefly attended Maryknoll Convent School before switching to St Joseph's College, where he received most of his primary and secondary education before moving to Queen's College for his final year of A-Levels. He subsequently enrolled at the University of Hong Kong, graduating in 1962 with a Bachelor of Medicine and Bachelor of Surgery.

== Career ==
=== Early medical and academic career ===
Leong became a doctor after graduating, specialising in urology and nephrology. He joined the medical faculty of HKU as a lecturer in the Department of Surgery in 1966, rising to senior lecturer and finally reader when he left the university in 1978. Leong was elected president of the Hong Kong Medical Association in 1988.

=== Legislative Council ===
He was elected to represent the medical constituency in the Legislative Council of Hong Kong in the 1988 election, unseating Chiu Hin-kwong. He was successfully re-elected in the 1991 and 1995 elections, and was elected to the provisional Legislative Council by the 400-member Selection Committee in the 1996 election. He ran for re-election for the last time in 1998, before standing down at the 2000 election. He was Chairman of the House Committee of the Legislative Council for many years and often presided over debates in the Council as Deputy President. Leung also served as a member of the Basic Law Consultative Committee.

=== Later career ===
Leong was appointed as the chairman of the Hospital Authority in 2002, but stepped down two years later due to mishandling of the SARS outbreak. During his leadership, the HA was ill-prepared for the severe pandemic. He failed to coordinate among different clusters to formulate an effective and comprehensive strategy to respond to the disease.

After leaving the Hospital Authority, Leong served as a non-official member of the Executive Council from 2005 to 2012. He was chairman of the HKU Council until 6 November 2015 and also chairman of the Standard Working Hours Committee.

Leong was awarded the Gold Bauhinia Star in 2001 and the Grand Bauhinia Medal in 2010.

== Personal life ==
Leong is married to Lilian Fung, who was head of the radiology department at Queen Mary Hospital. The couple have three children. Leong's brother, John Leong, is also a physician and served as Chairman of the Hospital Authority from 2013 to 2019.

== Honours ==
- Grand Bauhinia Medal (2010)
- Gold Bauhinia Star (2001)
- Justice of the Peace (1993)

Legislative Council of Hong Kong
Preceded by Chiu Hin-kwong	Member of Legislative Council; Representative for Medical; 1988–1997	Replaced by Provisional Legislative Council
Preceded by Elsie Tu	Chairman of House Committee; 1995–2000	Succeeded by Selina Chow
New parliament	Member of Provisional Legislative Council; 1997–1998	Replaced by Legislative Council
New parliament	Member of Legislative Council; Representative for Medical; 1998–2000	Succeeded by Lo Wing-lok
Non-profit organization positions
Preceded by Lo Ka-shui	Chairman of the Hospital Authority; 2002–2004	Succeeded by Anthony Wu
Academic offices
Preceded by Dr Victor Fung	Chairman of the Council of the University of Hong Kong; 2009–2015	Succeeded by Dr Arthur Li
Order of precedence
Preceded by Ronald Arculli; Recipient of the Grand Bauhinia Medal	Hong Kong order of precedence Recipient of the Grand Bauhinia Medal	Succeeded by Victor Fung; Recipient of the Grand Bauhinia Medal
