= Lo Wing-lok =

Hong Kong doctor and politician

Lo Wing-lok JP
- 勞永樂
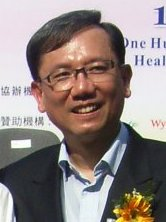

Member of the Legislative Council
- In office 1 October 2000 – 30 September 2004
- Preceded by: Leong Che-hung
- Succeeded by: Kwok Ka-ki
- Constituency: Medical

Personal details
- Born: 13 September 1954 Hong Kong
- Died: 9 May 2015 (aged 60) Hong Kong
- Party: League of Social Democrats (2006–07)
- Other political affiliations: Breakfast Group (2000–04)
- Spouse: Anna Yung Hiu-yan
- Education: St. Paul's College; University of Hong Kong
- Occupation: Doctor

Lo Wing-lok, JP (Chinese: 勞永樂; 13 September 1954 – 9 May 2015) was a Hong Kong doctor and politician. He was the Legislative Councillor for the Medical functional constituency from 2000 to 2004. He was the vice-chairman of the pro-democracy League of Social Democrats but quit the party in late 2007. He ran for the Legislative Council again in 2004, 2008 and 2012 but was not elected. He died from lung cancer in 2015.

== Biography ==
Lo was born in Hong Kong in 1954 and lived in the Healthy Village, a public housing estate in North Point. He graduated from St Paul's College in 1974 and from the Faculty of Medicine of the University of Hong Kong in 1979. He was an infectious disease specialist.

He entered into politics when he was elected to the Election Committee in the 1998 Subsector elections through the Medical sub-sector. He was elected to the Legislative Council of Hong Kong (Legco), representing the Medical functional constituency in 2000 Legco election. Lo was chairman of the Panel on Health Services of the Legislative Council from 2002 to 2003. He belonged to the pro-government parliamentary group Breakfast Group. During the controversies over Article 23 legislation, he publicly supported the national security law. He failed to retain the seat in the 2004 election won by urologist Kwok Ka-ki. During serving on the Legislative Council, he was also president of the Hong Kong Medical Association for two terms from 2002 to 2004.

Lo made a surprise move when he joined the newly founded pro-democracy League of Social Democrats in 2006 as vice-chairman, but resigned from the position and quit the party in late December 2007 over differences with the chairman Wong Yuk-man on the lease of the party's headquarters.

In 2007, he bid to represent the pan-democracy camp in the important Legco by-election for Hong Kong Island but was defeated in the primary by the eventual winner of the seat, Anson Chan.

Lo stood for the Hong Kong Island constituency in the 2008 and 2012 Legco elections as an independent candidate but was not returned.

== Personal life ==
He married his schoolmate, gynaecologist Anna Yung Hiu-yan, who died in 2013. They had a son, Alasdair Kai-yan Lo.

== Death ==
He battled lung cancer during his last years of his life. He was admitted to Queen Mary Hospital in May 2015 and then discharged, but died at Canossa Hospital the morning of 9 May.

Legislative Council of Hong Kong
Preceded by Leong Che-hung	Member of Legislative Council; Representative for Medical; 2000–2004	Succeeded by Kwok Ka-ki
Party political offices
New political party	Vice-Chairman of League of Social Democrats; 2006–2008	Succeeded by Andrew To
