= Opinion polling for the 2008 Hong Kong legislative election =

This article presents detailed opinion polling for the 2008 Hong Kong legislative election.

== Graphical representation ==
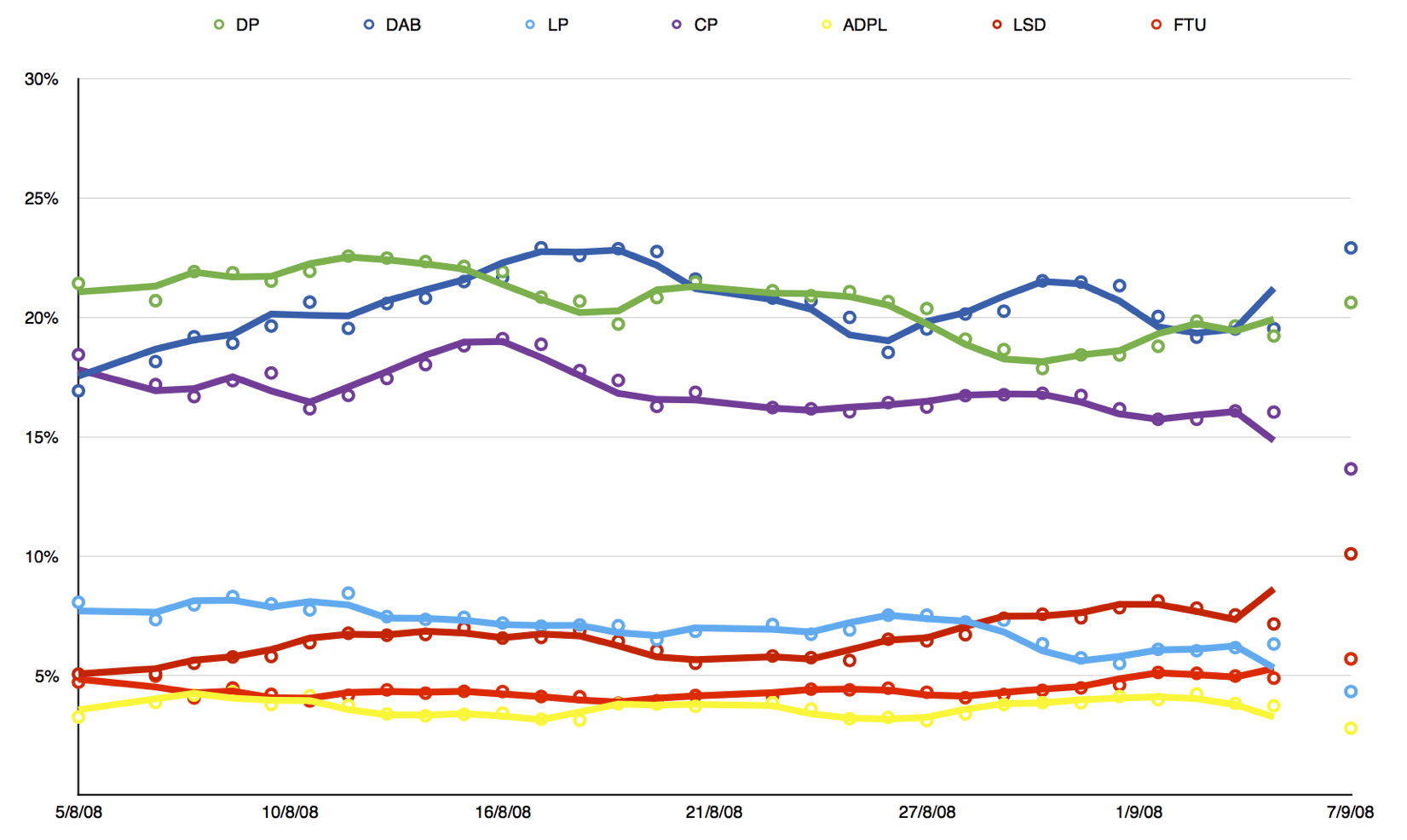
Democratic DAB Liberal Civic ADPL LSD FTU

== Overall poll results ==
Overall poll results each party in geographical constituencies according to each constituency.

Date(s) conducted	Polling source	Sample size	DP	DAB	TF	LP	CP	ADPL	FTU	LSD	Others	Lead
7 Sep 2008	Election results		20.6%	22.9%	2.2%	4.3%	13.7%	2.8%	5.7%	10.1%	38.3%	2.3%
1–5 Sep 2008	HKUPOP	3,566	19%	20%	3%	6%	16%	4%	5%	7%	21%	1%
31 Aug–4 Sep 2008	HKUPOP	3,271	20%	20%	2%	6%	16%	4%	5%	8%	20%	Tied
30 Aug–3 Sep 2008	HKUPOP	3,058	20%	19%	2%	6%	16%	4%	5%	8%	20%	1%
29 Aug–2 Sep 2008	HKUPOP	3,010	19%	20%	2%	6%	16%	4%	5%	8%	20%	1%
28 Aug–1 Sep 2008	HKUPOP	2,891	18%	21%	2%	6%	16%	4%	5%	8%	20%	3%
27–31 Aug 2008	HKUPOP	2,707	18%	21%	2%	6%	17%	4%	4%	7%	20%	3%
26–30 Aug 2008	HKUPOP	2,642	18%	22%	2%	6%	17%	4%	4%	8%	20%	4%
25–29 Aug 2008	HKUPOP	2,416	19%	20%	2%	7%	17%	4%	4%	7%	20%	1%
24–28 Aug 2008	HKUPOP	2,273	19%	20%	2%	7%	17%	3%	4%	7%	21%	1%
23–27 Aug 2008	HKUPOP	2,118	20%	20%	2%	8%	16%	3%	4%	6%	20%	Tied
21–26 Aug 2008	HKUPOP	2,097	21%	19%	2%	8%	16%	3%	4%	7%	21%	2%
20–25 Aug 2008	HKUPOP	2,052	21%	20%	2%	7%	16%	3%	4%	6%	21%	1%
19–24 Aug 2008	HKUPOP	2,007	21%	21%	2%	7%	16%	4%	4%	6%	20%	Tied
18–23 Aug 2008	HKUPOP	1,919	21%	21%	2%	7%	16%	4%	4%	6%	19%	Tied
17–21 Aug 2008	HKUPOP	1,853	21%	22%	2%	7%	17%	4%	4%	6%	17%	1%
16–20 Aug 2008	HKUPOP	1,805	21%	23%	2%	6%	16%	4%	4%	6%	18%	2%
15–19 Aug 2008	HKUPOP	1,766	20%	23%	2%	7%	17%	4%	4%	6%	17%	3%
14–18 Aug 2008	HKUPOP	1,751	21%	23%	2%	7%	18%	3%	4%	7%	16%	2%
13–17 Aug 2008	HKUPOP	1,765	21%	23%	2%	7%	19%	3%	4%	7%	14%	2%
12–16 Aug 2008	HKUPOP	1,774	22%	22%	1%	7%	19%	3%	4%	7%	14%	Tied
11–15 Aug 2008	HKUPOP	1,768	22%	22%	2%	7%	19%	3%	4%	7%	14%	Tied
10–14 Aug 2008	HKUPOP	1,775	22%	21%	2%	7%	18%	3%	4%	7%	15%	1%
9–13 Aug 2008	HKUPOP	1,702	23%	21%	2%	7%	17%	3%	4%	7%	15%	2%
8–12 Aug 2008	HKUPOP	1,643	23%	20%	2%	8%	17%	4%	4%	7%	16%	3%
7–11 Aug 2008	HKUPOP	1,590	22%	21%	2%	8%	16%	4%	4%	6%	17%	1%
5–10 Aug 2008	HKUPOP	1,539	22%	20%	2%	8%	18%	4%	4%	6%	17%	1%
4–9 Aug 2008	HKUPOP	1,448	22%	19%	2%	8%	17%	4%	4%	6%	17%	3%
3–8 Aug 2008	HKUPOP	1,395	22%	19%	2%	8%	17%	4%	4%	6%	18%	3%
2–7 Aug 2008	HKUPOP	1,344	21%	18%	3%	7%	17%	4%	5%	5%	20%	3%
1–5 Aug 2008	HKUPOP	1,302	21%	17%	3%	8%	18%	3%	5%	5%	19%	3%
12 Sep 2004	Last election results	1,784,406	25.2%	22.7%	6.9%	6.7%	6.6%	4.2%	3.0%	—	24.7%	2.5%

== See also ==
- Opinion polling for the Hong Kong legislative election, 2004
- Opinion polling for the Hong Kong legislative election, 2012
