= Opinion polling for the 2004 Hong Kong legislative election =

This article presents detailed opinion polling for the 2004 Hong Kong legislative election.

== Graphical representation ==
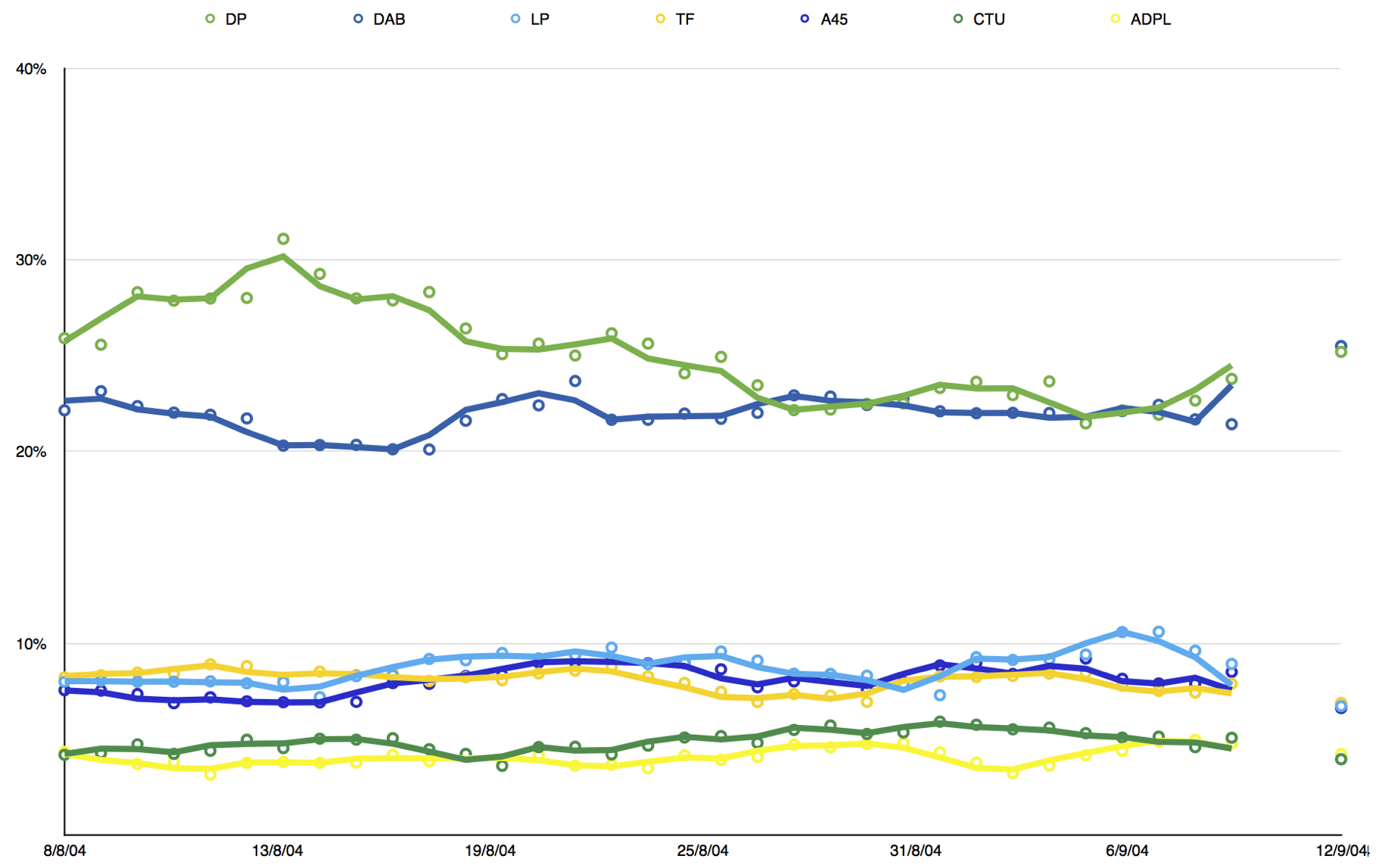

== Overall poll results ==
Overall poll results each party in geographical constituencies according to each constituency.

Date(s) conducted	Polling source	Sample size	DP	DAB	CTU	TF	ADPL	LP	A45CG	Others	Lead
12 Sep 2004	Election results		25.2%	25.5%	4.0%	6.9%	4.2%	6.7%	6.6%	20.9%	0.3%
7–9 Sep 2004	HKUPOP	2,395	24%	21%	5%	8%	5%	9%	8%	20%	3%
6–8 Sep 2004	HKUPOP	2,121	23%	22%	5%	7%	5%	10%	8%	21%	1%
5–7 Sep 2004	HKUPOP	1,978	22%	22%	5%	8%	5%	11%	8%	20%	Tied
4–6 Sep 2004	HKUPOP	1,902	22%	22%	5%	8%	4%	11%	8%	20%	Tied
3–5 Sep 2004	HKUPOP	1,784	21%	22%	5%	8%	4%	9%	9%	20%	1%
2–4 Sep 2004	HKUPOP	1,669	24%	22%	6%	8%	4%	9%	8%	19%	2%
1–3 Sep 2004	HKUPOP	1,559	23%	22%	6%	8%	3%	9%	8%	21%	1%
31 Aug–2 Sep 2004	HKUPOP	1,439	24%	22%	6%	8%	4%	9%	9%	18%	2%
30 Aug–1 Sep 2004	HKUPOP	1,364	23%	22%	6%	8%	4%	7%	9%	20%	1%
29–31 Aug 2004	HKUPOP	1,305	22%	23%	5%	8%	5%	8%	8%	21%	1%
28–30 Aug 2004	HKUPOP	1,297	22%	22%	5%	7%	5%	8%	8%	22%	Tied
27–29 Aug 2004	HKUPOP	1,285	22%	23%	6%	7%	5%	8%	8%	21%	1%
26–28 Aug 2004	HKUPOP	1,278	22%	23%	5%	7%	5%	8%	8%	21%	1%
25–27 Aug 2004	HKUPOP	1,280	23%	22%	5%	7%	4%	9%	8%	22%	1%
24–26 Aug 2004	HKUPOP	1,281	25%	22%	5%	7%	4%	10%	9%	19%	3%
23–25 Aug 2004	HKUPOP	1,332	24%	22%	5%	8%	4%	9%	9%	19%	2%
22–24 Aug 2004	HKUPOP	1,312	26%	22%	5%	8%	3%	9%	9%	18%	4%
21–23 Aug 2004	HKUPOP	1,246	26%	22%	4%	9%	4%	10%	9%	17%	4%
20–22 Aug 2004	HKUPOP	1,134	25%	24%	5%	9%	4%	9%	9%	16%	1%
19–21 Aug 2004	HKUPOP	1,099	26%	22%	5%	8%	4%	9%	9%	17%	4%
18–20 Aug 2004	HKUPOP	1,113	25%	23%	4%	8%	4%	9%	8%	19%	2%
17–19 Aug 2004	HKUPOP	1,132	26%	22%	4%	8%	4%	9%	8%	18%	4%
16–18 Aug 2004	HKUPOP	1,151	28%	20%	4%	8%	4%	9%	8%	18%	8%
15–17 Aug 2004	HKUPOP	1,131	28%	20%	5%	8%	4%	8%	8%	18%	8%
14–16 Aug 2004	HKUPOP	1,109	28%	20%	5%	8%	4%	8%	7%	19%	8%
13–15 Aug 2004	HKUPOP	1,076	29%	20%	5%	9%	4%	7%	7%	19%	9%
12–14 Aug 2004	HKUPOP	1,086	31%	20%	5%	8%	4%	8%	7%	17%	11%
11–13 Aug 2004	HKUPOP	1,088	28%	22%	5%	9%	4%	8%	7%	18%	6%
10–12 Aug 2004	HKUPOP	1,098	28%	22%	4%	9%	3%	8%	7%	18%	6%
9–11 Aug 2004	HKUPOP	1,099	28%	22%	4%	8%	4%	8%	7%	19%	6%
8–10 Aug 2004	HKUPOP	1,069	28%	22%	5%	8%	4%	8%	7%	17%	6%
7–9 Aug 2004	HKUPOP	1,064	26%	23%	4%	8%	4%	8%	8%	19%	3%
6–8 Aug 2004	HKUPOP	1,072	26%	22%	4%	8%	4%	8%	8%	20%	4%
10 Sep 2000	Last election results		31.7%	28.4%	7.3%	6.8%	4.8%	1.9%	—	19.1%	3.3%

== See also ==
- Opinion polling for the Hong Kong legislative election, 2008
