= Leung Ka-lau =

Hong Kong politician (born 1962)

Dr the Honourable Leung Ka-lau
- 梁家騮

Member of the Legislative Council
- In office 1 October 2008 – 30 September 2016
- Preceded by: Kwok Ka-ki
- Succeeded by: Pierre Chan
- Constituency: Medical

Personal details
- Born: 1962 (age 63–64) Hong Kong
- Education: Chinese University of Hong Kong (MBChB); University of Edinburgh (F.R.C.S.)
- Occupation: Doctor

Leung Ka-lau
- Traditional Chinese: 梁家騮
- Simplified Chinese: 梁家骝
Transcriptions
Standard Mandarin
- Hanyu Pinyin: Liáng Jiāliú
Yue: Cantonese
- Jyutping: Loeng4 Ga1 Lau4

Leung Ka-lau (born 1962) is a Hong Kong surgeon and former politician. He was a member of the Legislative Council of Hong Kong (Functional constituency, medical). He is the first public hospital doctor to be elected as a legislator. He beat pan-democrat Kwok Ka-ki for the seat in the 2008 Hong Kong legislative election. Dr. Leung is a surgeon specialising in General Surgery in the Prince of Wales Hospital in Shatin.

Leung Ka-lau, who has represented the medical functional constituency since 2008, has voted with moderate mindset on various issues. However, he is widely considered a pro-Beijing politician.

== Government doctors' pay claim ==
In 2002, Leung was named first plaintiff in a suit brought by 165 public hospital doctors against the Hospital Authority for remuneration for working on rest days and public holidays and for overtime work. The Court of First Instance ruled they be compensated for loss of rest days and public holidays but dismissed their overtime claim. The Hospital Authority then offered compensation of HK$600 million to the 4,000 doctors affected.

Legislative Council of Hong Kong
| Preceded by Kwok Ka-ki | Member of Legislative Council; Representative for Medical; 2008–2016 | Succeeded by Pierre Chan |
