= Medical and Health Services (constituency) =

Hong Kong functional constituency

Medical and Health Services 醫療衞生界
- Functional constituency for the Legislative Council of Hong Kong
- Region: Hong Kong
- Electorate: 49,316

Current constituency
- Created: 2021
- Number of members: One
- Member: David Lam (Independent)
- Created from: Medical; Health Services

The Medical and Health Services functional constituency (Chinese: 醫療衞生界功能界別) is a functional constituency seat in the Legislative Council of Hong Kong first created for the 2021 Legislative Council election, combined from the Medical and Health Services functional constituencies. It has the second largest voter base in the functional constituencies after Education functional constituency.

== Return members ==
Election	Member	Party
2021	David Lam	Independent
2025	David Lam	Independent

== Electoral results ==
=== 2020s ===
2025 Legislative Council election: Medical and Health Services
Party	Candidate	Votes	%	±%
Independent	David Lam Tzit-yuen	11,739	70.60	+35.92
Independent	John Leung Lai-yin	4,889	29.40	
Majority		6,850	41.20	
Total valid votes		16,628		
Rejected ballots		777	4.46	
Turnout		17,405	35.29	
Registered electors		49,316		
Independent hold		Swing		

2021 Legislative Council election: Medical and Health Services
Party	Candidate	Votes	%	±%
Independent	David Lam Tzit-yuen	5,511	34.68	
DAB	Chan Wing-kwong	3,446	21.68	
Independent	Scarlett Pong Oi-lan	2,719	17.11	
Independent	Chan Chi-chung	2,585	16.27	
Independent	Ho Sung-hon	1,631	10.26	
Majority		2,065	13.00	
Total valid votes		15,892	100.00	
Rejected ballots		523		
Turnout		16,415	29.56	
Registered electors		55,523		
Independent win (new seat)				
