= Kwok Ka-ki =

Hong Kong doctor and politician

- 郭家麒
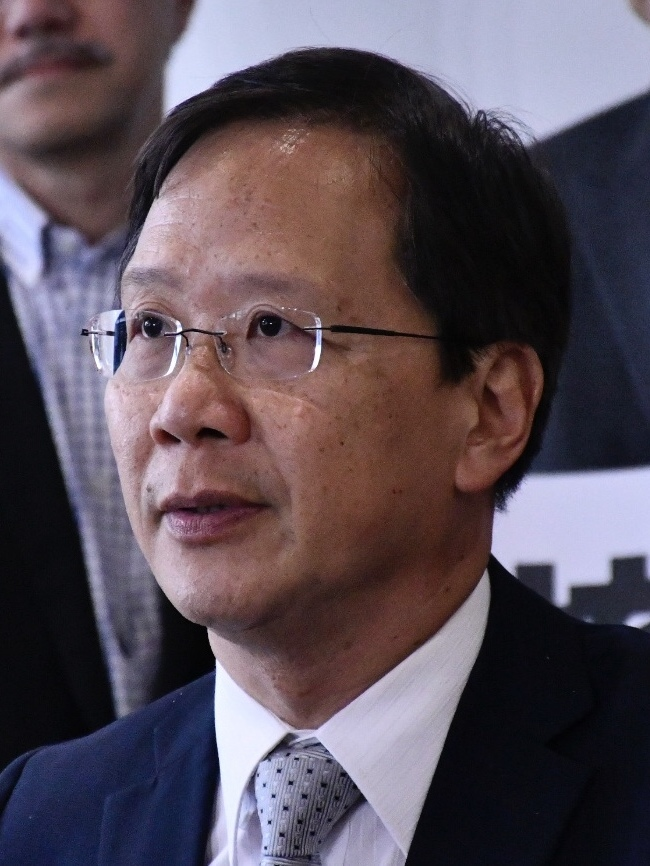

Member of the Legislative Council
- In office 1 October 2012 – 11 November 2020
- Preceded by: Albert Ho
- Succeeded by: Constituency abolished
- Constituency: New Territories West
- In office 1 October 2004 – 30 September 2008
- Preceded by: Lo Wing-lok
- Succeeded by: Leung Ka-lau
- Constituency: Medical

Member of the Central and Western District Council
- In office 1 November 1994 – 1 January 2008
- Preceded by: Lam Kin-lai; Chow Wai-keung
- Succeeded by: Jackie Cheung Yick-hung
- Constituency: Mid Levels East

Personal details
- Born: 20 July 1961 (age 64) British Hong Kong
- Party: Civic Party (2010–21)
- Other political affiliations: CWDP
- Spouse: Shirley Kwok
- Education: CCC Chuen Yuen College
- Alma mater: University of Hong Kong (MBBS, MA)
- Profession: Urologist

Kwok Ka-ki
- Chinese: 郭家麒
Transcriptions
Standard Mandarin
- Hanyu Pinyin: Guō Jiāqí
Yue: Cantonese
- Yale Romanization: Gwok Gā Kèih
- Jyutping: Gwok^{3} Gaa^{1} Kei^{4}

Kwok Ka-ki (Chinese: 郭家麒; born 20 July 1961) is a Hong Kong former politician. He is a private urology doctor, having graduated from the Faculty of Medicine at the University of Hong Kong. Kwok is a member of the Civic Party, having joined on 19 July 2010. On 11 November 2020, he was disqualified from the Legislative Council, along with three other lawmakers of the pan-democratic camp, by the central government in Beijing on request of the Hong Kong government. A mass resignation of pan-democrats the same day left the Legislative Council without a substantial opposition.

== Early life and education ==
Kwok has family roots in Jieyang, Guangdong. He graduated in 1985 from the Faculty of Medicine at the University of Hong Kong. After graduation, he worked as a private urology doctor.

== Political career ==
Kwok Ka-ki served three terms in the Legislative Council. From 2004 to 2008 he served as a member for the Medical functional constituency, losing in the 2008 Hong Kong legislative election to Leung Ka-lau. From 2012 to 2020, Kwok served as a member of the Legislative Council for New Territories West. From 1994 until 2007, Kwok was a member of the Central and Western District Council, representing Mid Levels East.

== Opposition to renaming of the HKU Faculty of Medicine ==
On 23 May 2005, Kwok participated in a press conference of University of Hong Kong alumni who protested the renaming of the university's Faculty of Medicine as Li Ka Shing Faculty of Medicine. The renaming was to honour a donation of 128 million US dollars to the faculty by business tycoon and philanthropist Li Ka-shing. In an interview at that time, Kwok complained about the lack of transparent process prior to the decision.

== Condemnation of police during the 2019–2020 Hong Kong protests ==
During the 2019–2020 Hong Kong protests, Kwok lambasted the police strategy during the 2019 Prince Edward station attack of 31 August 2019, which allegedly hindered first aiders from entering the station to treat the wounded, as a "behaviour unbefitting of monsters".

== Criticism of government COVID-19 measures ==
On 28 April 2020, Food and Health Secretary Sophia Chan announced that due to the easing of the COVID-19 pandemic, entry restrictions from the mainland that had been imposed earlier in the pandemic would be scrapped for students, teachers and people with business activities "beneficial to Hong Kong". Kwok sharply criticized this decision, saying that the risk of imported COVID-19 cases from mainland China was still great, and likening the step to "inviting a wolf into your home".

In October 2020, Kwok criticized the plan of the Hong Kong government to introduce mandatory COVID-19 testing for patients with symptoms, saying that making tests mandatory would breach the medical code of practice, could possibly be counterproductive due to those who did not want to be tested not seeking medical attention, and be a waste of government resources as symptoms such as headaches were also common in diseases other than COVID-19. He also slammed the government's easing of social distancing measures for local tour groups and wedding ceremonies to a respective limit of 30 and 50 people respectively, alleging that the continuing four-person gathering limit had remained in place in order to suppress public demonstrations.

== Political disqualification ==
Five weeks ahead of the (subsequently postponed) 2020 Hong Kong Legislative Council Election, on 30 July 2020, as Kwok prepared to defend his seat, the government stated that he was among a dozen pro-democracy candidates whose nominations were 'invalid', under an opaque process in which, nominally, civil servants – returning officers – assess whether, for instance, a candidate had objected to the enactment of the national security law, or was sincere in statements made disavowing separatism. On 11 November 2020, following a decision of the Standing Committee of the National People's Congress he was disqualified from Legislative Council along with three other lawmakers; this resulted in the resignation of a further 15 pro-democracy lawmakers.

== Professional disqualification ==
Kwok Ka-ki, having completed his sentence for violating the National Security Law, was permanently removed from the medical register by the Medical Council on April 16, 2026, one year after his release. This was the first disciplinary hearing for a registered doctor convicted of a national security offense. The inquiry panel stated that Kwok Ka-ki's blatant violation of the National Security Law as a doctor affected public confidence in the medical profession, thus barring him from practicing in Hong Kong. This case, the first to be investigated for a doctor involved in a national security legal case, sets a precedent.

== Arrest and withdrawal from politics ==
On 6 January 2021, Kwok was among 53 members of the pro-democratic camp who were arrested under the national security law, specifically its provision regarding alleged subversion. The group stood accused of the organisation of and participation in unofficial primary elections held by the camp in July 2020. Kwok was released on bail on 7 January, a decision that was overturned by a higher court on 13 March. During the bail hearings, Kwok resigned from the Civic Party and later announced his decision to leave politics, also penning an open letter together with Alvin Yeung, Jeremy Tam and Lee Yue-shun, publicized on 15 April, which called for the party to disband.

== Personal life ==
On 15 July 2017, Kwok was denied entry to Macau, with authorities citing as reason his being a threat to internal security. Kwok called the decision "extremely ridiculous" and asked Chief Executive Carrie Lam to request an explanation from Macau authorities.

Political offices
Preceded by Lam Kin-lai; Chow Wai-keung	Member of Central and Western District Council; Representative for Mid Levels East; 1994–2008	Succeeded by Jackie Cheung Yick-hung
Legislative Council of Hong Kong
Preceded by Lo Wing-lok	Member of Legislative Council; Representative for Medical; 2004–2008	Succeeded by Leung Ka-lau
Preceded by Albert Ho	Member of Legislative Council; Representative for New Territories West; 2012–2020	Constituency abolished
