= Medical (constituency) =

Former Hong Kong functional constituency

Medical 醫學界
- Former Functional constituency for the Legislative Council of Hong Kong
- Region: Hong Kong
- Electorate: 12,302 (2020)

Former constituency
- Created: 1985
- Abolished: 2021
- Number of members: One
- Replaced by: Medical and Health Services

The Medical functional constituency (Chinese: 醫學界功能界別) was a functional constituency in the elections for the Legislative Council of Hong Kong first created as one of the 12 functional constituency seats created for the 1985 Legislative Council election. It corresponds to the Medical Subsector in the Election Committee. Electors include all medical participators and dentists. It was combined with Health Services into Medical and Health Services functional constituency in the major electoral overhaul in 2021.

== Return members ==
Election	Member	Party	Votes	%
1985	Chiu Hin-kwong	Nonpartisan	1,168	52.68
1988	Edward Leong Che-hung	Nonpartisan→Democratic Foundation	1,359	62.48
1991	Edward Leong Che-hung	Democratic Foundation→Meeting Point→Independent	N/A	
1995	Edward Leong Che-hung	Independent	2,371	94.61
Not represented in the Provisional Legislative Council (1997–98)
1998	Edward Leong Che-hung	Independent	2,759	70.19
2000	Lo Wing-lok	Independent	1,804	39.96
2004	Kwok Ka-ki	Independent	3,197	50.88
2008	Leung Ka-lau	Independent	2,217	32.58
2012	Leung Ka-lau	Independent	4,541	67.31
2016	Pierre Chan	Nonpartisan	5,626	71.44

== Electoral results ==
=== 2010s ===
2016 Legislative Council election: Medical
Party	Candidate	Votes	%	±%
Nonpartisan	Pierre Chan	5,626	71.44	
Nonpartisan	Wong Yee-him	2,249	28.56	
Majority		3,377	23.18	
Total valid votes		6,746	100.00	
Rejected ballots		355		
Turnout		8,230	73.54	+13.38
Registered electors		11,191		
Nonpartisan hold		Swing		

2012 Legislative Council election: Medical
Party	Candidate	Votes	%	±%
Nonpartisan	Leung Ka-lau	4,541	67.31	+34.73
Nonpartisan	Tse Hung-hing	2,205	32.69	
Majority		2,336	34.62	
Total valid votes		6,746	100.00	
Rejected ballots		457		
Turnout		7,203	66.16	
Registered electors		10,888		
Nonpartisan hold		Swing		

=== 2000s ===
2008 Legislative Council election: Medical
Party	Candidate	Votes	%	±%
Nonpartisan	Leung Ka-lau	2,217	32.58	
Nonpartisan	Ho Pak-leung	2,138	31.42	
Nonpartisan	Kwok Ka-ki	1,869	27.47	−23.41
Nonpartisan	Yeung Chiu-fat Henry	580	8.52	
Majority		79	1.16	
Total valid votes		6,804	100.00	
Rejected ballots		75		
Turnout		6,879	64.86	
Registered electors		10,606		
Nonpartisan gain from Nonpartisan		Swing		

2004 Legislative Council election: Medical
Party	Candidate	Votes	%	±%
Independent	Kwok Ka-ki	3,197	50.88	+31.68
Independent	Lo Wing-lok	2,667	42.45	+2.29
Nonpartisan	Johnny Ma Kam-cheun	419	6.67	
Majority		530	8.43	
Total valid votes		6,283	100.00	
Rejected ballots		248		
Turnout		6,531	69.81	
Registered electors		9,356		
Independent gain from Independent		Swing		

2000 Legislative Council election: Medical
Party	Candidate	Votes	%	±%
Nonpartisan	Lo Wing-lok	1,804	39.96	
Nonpartisan	Dennis Lam Shun-chiu	1,458	32.29	
Nonpartisan	Kwok Ka-ki	867	19.20	
Nonpartisan	So Kai-ming	386	8.55	
Majority		346	13.09	
Total valid votes		4,515	100.00	
Rejected ballots		84		
Turnout		4,599	59.71	
Registered electors		7,702		
Nonpartisan gain from Nonpartisan		Swing		

=== 1990s ===
1998 Legislative Council election: Medical
Party	Candidate	Votes	%	±%
Nonpartisan	Edward Leong Che-hung	2,759	70.19	
Independent	Chan Kai-tak	1,172	29.81	
Majority		1,587	40.38	
Total valid votes		3,931	100.00	
Rejected ballots		84		
Turnout		4,056	59.95	
Registered electors		6,766		
Nonpartisan hold		Swing		

1995 Legislative Council election: Medical
Party	Candidate	Votes	%	±%
Nonpartisan	Edward Leong Che-hung	2,371	94.61	
Nonpartisan	Cecilia Young Yau-yau	135	5.39	
Majority		2,236	89.22	
Total valid votes		2,506	100.00	
Rejected ballots		31		
Turnout		2,537	53.38	
Registered electors		4,753		
Nonpartisan hold		Swing		

1991 Legislative Council election: Medical
Party	Candidate	Votes	%	±%
HKDF	Edward Leong Che-hung	Unopposed		
Registered electors		4,031		
HKDF hold		Swing		

=== 1980s ===
1988 Legislative Council election: Medical
Party	Candidate	Votes	%	±%
Nonpartisan	Edward Leong Che-hung	1,359	62.48	+15.16
Nonpartisan	Chiu Hin-kwong	816	37.52	−15.16
Majority		543	24.96	
Total valid votes		2,175	100.00	
Nonpartisan gain from Nonpartisan		Swing		

1985 Legislative Council election: Medical
Party	Candidate	Votes	%	±%
Nonpartisan	Chiu Hin-kwong	1,168	52.68	
Nonpartisan	Edward Leong Che-hung	1,049	47.32	
Majority		119	5.36	
Total valid votes		2,217	100.00	
Nonpartisan win (new seat)				
