= Hong Kong Medical Association =

Professional association of doctors in Hong Kong

- 香港醫學會
- Formation: 1920
- Legal status: Trade union
- Website: www.hkma.org

The Hong Kong Medical Association is a trade union in Hong Kong. Established in 1920 as the Hong Kong Chinese Medical Association, it was renamed to its current name in 1970.
