= List of Legislative Council of Hong Kong members 1991–1995 =

This is a list of Members elected to the Legislative Council in the colonial period at the 1991 election, held on 15 September 1991.

== Composition ==
Affiliation	Election	At dissolution
Co-operative Resources Centre/Liberal Party	0	15
Liberal Democratic Federation of Hong Kong	3	1
Hong Kong Federation of Trade Unions/Democratic Alliance for the Betterment of Hong Kong	1	1
New Hong Kong Alliance	1	1
Federation for the Stability of Hong Kong	3	0
Business and Professionals Federation of Hong Kong	2	0
Breakfast Group	0	6
Independent	13	2
Total for Conservatives/pro-Beijing	23	26
United Democrats of Hong Kong/Democratic Party	14	15
Hong Kong Democratic Foundation	2	1
Hong Kong Association for Democracy and People's Livelihood	1	1
Hong Kong and Kowloon Trades Union Council	1	1
Hong Kong Confederation of Trade Unions	0	1
Meeting Point	2	0
Independent	3	4
Total for Liberals/pro-democracy	23	23
Non-aligned Independent	10	8
Ex officio members	3	3
President (Governor)	1	0
Total	60	60

Note: Italic represents organizations that still function but become under another affiliation.

== Graphical representation of the Legislative Council ==

- Ex officio members
Liberals/Pro-democracy:
- CTU
- Democratic Party
- ADPL
- TUC
- DF
- Independents
Conservatives/Pro-Beijing:
- Liberal Party
- Breakfast Group
- NHKA
- LDF
- DAB
- Independents

== List of Members elected in the legislative election ==
The following table is a list of LegCo members elected on 15 September 1991. Members who did not serve throughout the term are italicised.

Key to changes since legislative election:

^{a} = change in party allegiance
^{b} = resigned/by-election
^{c} = other change
^{d} = did not take seat

Selection Method	Capacity or Constituency	Elected Members	Elected Party	Political Alignment	Born	Assumed Office
President	Governor	David Clive Wilson	Nonpartisan	Government	14 February 1935	1987
Deputy Pres.	Appointed	John Joseph Swaine	Independent	Conservative	22 April 1932	1980
EO	Chief Secretary	David Robert Ford	Nonpartisan	Government	22 February 1935	1980
EO	Financial Secretary	Nathaniel W. H. Macleod	Nonpartisan	Government	6 January 1940	1987
EO	Attorney General	Jeremy Fell Mathews	Nonpartisan	Government	14 December 1941	1980
AP	Appointed	Allen Lee	Independent^{a}	Conservative	24 April 1940	1978
FC	First Industrial^{b}	Stephen Cheong	BPF^{a}	Conservative	31 May 1941	1980
AP	Appointed	Selina Chow	Independent^{a}	Conservative	25 January 1945	1981
AP	Appointed^{b}	Rita Fan	Independent^{a}	Conservative	20 September 1945	1983
FC	Social Services	Hui Yin-fat	Independent	Pro-democracy	28 April 1936	1985
GC	Hong Kong Island East	Martin Lee	United Democrats^{a}	Pro-democracy	8 June 1938	1985
FC	Finance	David Li	Independent	Conservative	13 March 1939	1985
FC	Second Industrial	Ngai Shiu-kit	LDF^{a}	Conservative	14 November 1924	1985
FC	Labour	Pang Chun-hoi	TUC	Pro-Taiwan	26 June 1921	1985
GC	Kowloon East	Szeto Wah	United Democrats^{a}	Pro-democracy	28 February 1931	1985
GC	New Territories West^{b}	Tai Chin-wah^{d}	FSHK	Conservative	24 August 1952	1985
FC	Labour	Tam Yiu-chung	FTU^{a}	Pro-Beijing	15 December 1949	1985
GC	New Territories East	Andrew Wong	Independent	Moderate	11 December 1943	1985
FC	Rural	Lau Wong-fat	FSHK^{a}	Conservative	15 October 1936	1985
FC	Architectural, Surveying and Planning	Edward Ho	BPF^{a}	Conservative	2 December 1938	1987
FC	Real Estate and Construction	Ronald Joseph Arculli	Independent^{a}	Conservative	2 January 1939	1988
AP	Appointed	Martin Gilbert Barrow	Independent^{a}	Conservative	10 March 1944	1988
AP	Appointed	Peggy Lam	Independent^{a}	Conservative	2 May 1928	1988
AP	Appointed	Miriam Lau	Independent^{a}	Conservative	27 April 1947	1988
AP	Appointed	Lau Wah-sum	Independent^{a}	Conservative	30 January 1928	1988
FC	Medical	Leong Che-hung	DF^{a}	Pro-democracy	23 April 1939	1988
FC	First Commercial	James David McGregor	DF	Pro-democracy	30 January 1924	1988
FC	Urban Council	Elsie Tu	Independent	Moderate	2 June 1913	1988
FC	Accountancy	Peter Wong	LDF^{a}	Conservative	25 April 1944	1988
GC	New Territories South	Albert Chan	United Democrats^{a}	Pro-democracy	3 March 1955	1991
AP	Appointed^{b}	Edward Chen	Independent	Moderate	14 January 1945	1991
AP	Appointed	Vincent Cheng	Independent	Conservative	16 July 1948	1991
AP	Appointed	Moses Cheng	Independent^{a}	Conservative	1950	1991
AP	Appointed	Marvin Cheung	Independent^{a}	Conservative	20 November 1947	1991
FC	Teaching	Cheung Man-kwong	United Democrats^{a}	Pro-democracy	15 September 1954	1991
FC	Financial Services	Chim Pui-chung	Independent	Conservative	24 September 1946	1991
GC	New Territories North	Fung Chi-wood	United Democrats^{a}	Pro-democracy	23 August 1956	1991
GC	Kowloon West	Frederick Fung	ADPL	Pro-democracy	17 March 1953	1991
AP	Appointed	Timothy Ha	Independent	Moderate	21 May 1937	1991
FC	Health	Michael Ho	United Democrats^{a}	Pro-democracy	6 November 1955	1991
GC	Hong Kong Island West	Huang Chen-ya	United Democrats^{a}	Pro-democracy	4 November 1939	1991
FC	Legal	Simon Ip	Independent^{a}	Moderate	10 September 1948	1991
AP	Appointed	Lam Kui-chun	Independent^{a}	Conservative	20 November 1941	1991
GC	Kowloon Central	Conrad Lam	United Democrats^{a}	Pro-democracy	24 November 1935	1991
GC	Kowloon Central	Lau Chin-shek	United Democrats^{a}	Pro-democracy	12 September 1944	1991
GC	New Territories East	Emily Lau	Independent	Pro-democracy	22 January 1952	1991
GC	New Territories South	Lee Wing-tat	United Democrats^{a}	Pro-democracy	25 December 1955	1991
FC	Regional Council^{b}	Gilbert Leung	FSHK	Conservative	23 July 1953	1991
AP	Appointed	Eric Li	Independent^{a}	Conservative	23 May 1953	1991
GC	Kowloon East	Fred Li	Meeting Point^{a}	Pro-democracy	25 April 1955	1991
AP	Appointed^{b}	Felice Lieh Mak	Independent	Conservative	10 August 1941	1991
GC	Hong Kong Island East	Man Sai-cheong	United Democrats^{a}	Pro-democracy	15 July 1944	1991
GC	New Territories West^{b}	Ng Ming-yum	United Democrats^{a}	Pro-democracy	13 April 1955	1991
AP	Appointed	Steven Poon	Independent^{a}	Conservative	9 July 1943	1991
AP	Appointed	Henry Tang	Independent^{a}	Conservative	6 September 1952	1991
GC	New Territories North	Tik Chi-yuen	Meeting Point^{a}	Pro-democracy	24 September 1957	1991
GC	Kowloon West	James To	United Democrats^{a}	Pro-democracy	11 March 1963	1991
FC	Engineering	Samuel Wong	Independent^{a}	Conservative	2 November 1937	1991
FC	Second Commercial	Philip Wong	NHKA	Conservative/Pro-Beijing	23 December 1938	1991
GC	Hong Kong Island West	Yeung Sum	United Democrats^{a}	Pro-democracy	22 November 1947	1991
FC	Tourism	Howard Young	LDF^{a}	Conservative	30 March 1948	1991

== By-elections ==
- A by-election was held for the New Territories West after the elected member Tai Chin-wah refused to take the seat and was subsequently discovered forging credentials. Zachary Wong Wai-yin of the Meeting Point won the vacant seat on 8 December 1991.
- 30 August 1992, another by-election was held for the vacant seat in New Territories West after Ng Ming-yum died in office, Independent rural leader Tang Siu-tong was elected.
- 15 July 1993, James Tien, former appointed unofficial member of the Legislative Council won in the Industrial (First) by-election after the incumbent Stephen Cheong died of a heart attack.
- 28 July 1993, Alfred Tso won in the by-election for the Regional Council after legislator Gilbert Leung found guilty in for trying to bribe two regional councillors to vote for him in the 1991 election and was removed from the seat.
- 5 March 1993, Lee Cheuk-yan replaced Lau Chin-shek in the Kowloon Central constituency after Lau resigned from his office in protest after an important labour bill which he had amended to protect workers was withdrawn by the government.

== Other changes ==
- Allen Lee, the Senior Unofficial Member of the Council with some other 17 appointed members founded a political grouping called Co-operative Resources Centre on 12 December 1991 as a counter-force to the United Democrats of Hong Kong. The group eventually transformed into the Liberal Party on 6 June 1993.
- Tam Yiu-chung (Labour) unionist from the Hong Kong Federation of Trade Unions co-founded the Beijing-loyalist party the Democratic Alliance for the Betterment of Hong Kong in July 1992. Tam became the sole representative in the Council until 1995.
- Rita Fan, Edward Chen and Felice Lieh Mak, three appointed members resigned and subsequently replaced by Christine Loh, Roger Luk and Anna Wu.
- Edward Leong Che-hung (Medical), member of the Hong Kong Democratic Foundation joined the Meeting Point.
- The two largest pro-democratic parties the United Democrats of Hong Kong and Meeting Point merged into a new party called the Democratic Party on 2 October 1994, all LegCo members from the previous two parties except for Edward Leong joined the newly formed party.

== See also ==
- 1991 Hong Kong legislative election
