= 1994 Hong Kong electoral reform =

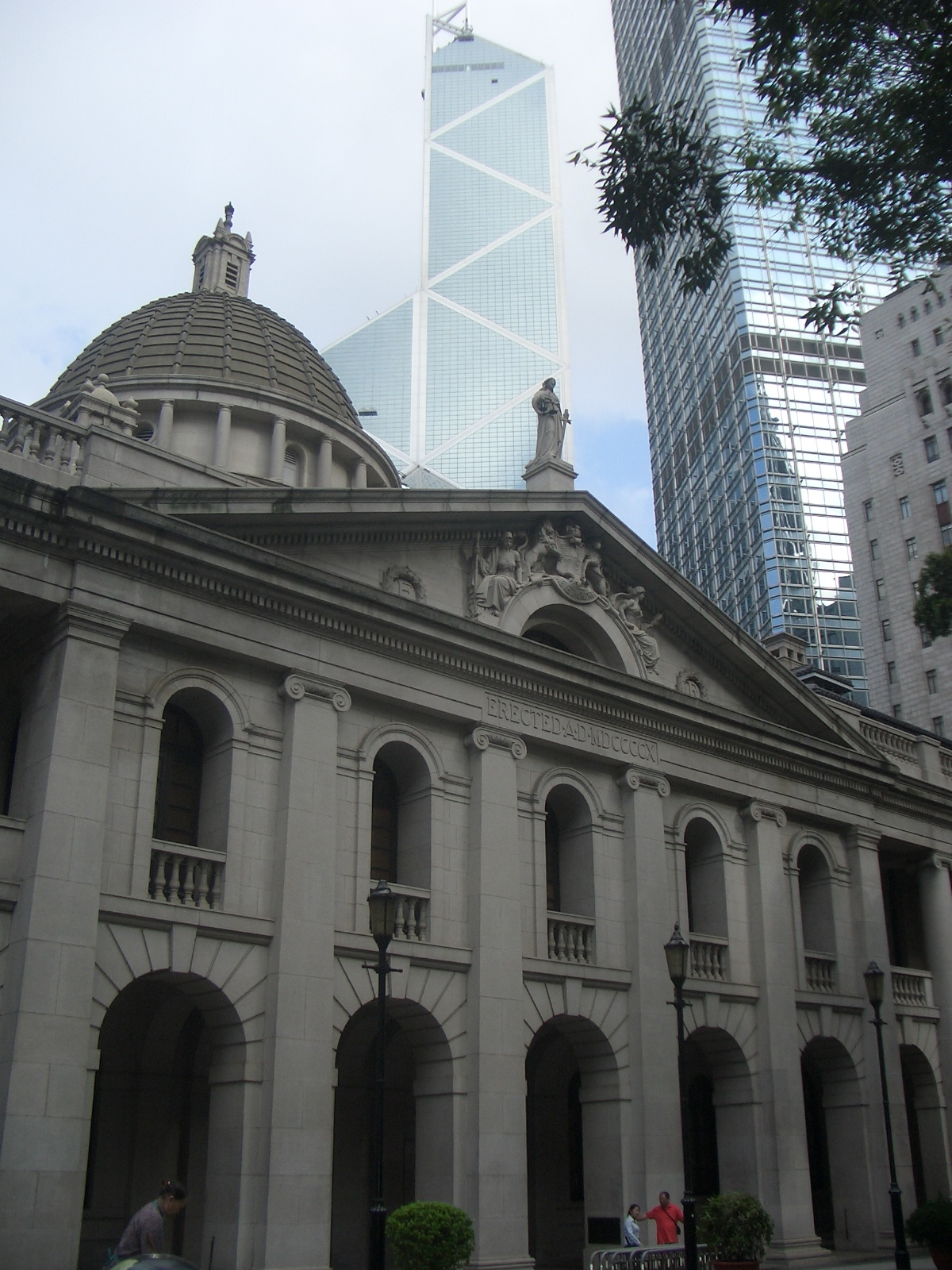
The Old Supreme Court Building was the home of the Legislative Council in the final years of the colonial period.

The 1994 Hong Kong electoral reform was a set of significant constitutional changes in the last years of British colonial rule in Hong Kong before the handover of its sovereignty to the People's Republic of China (PRC) on 1 July 1997. The reform aimed at broadening the electorate base of the three-tiers elections in 1994 and 1995, namely the 1994 District Board elections, the 1995 Urban and Regional Council elections and the 1995 Legislative Council election. It was the flagship policy of the last colonial governor Chris Patten.

The reform became a political storm in Hong Kong politics and diplomatic row between China and Britain. Under the opposition of Hong Kong and Macao Affairs Office of the PRC led by Lu Ping, the bill split the Legislative Council of Hong Kong. It was openly criticized by the Hong Kong tycoons and the diplomat-sinologists of the U.K. Foreign Office for breaching the Seven Hurd-Qian letters between British Foreign Secretary Douglas Hurd and PRC Foreign Minister Qian Qichen in 1990. The bill secured a dramatic narrow passage after surviving Liberal Party Allen Lee's hostile amendment by one vote 29 to 28 and was eventually passed with the support of the pro-democracy camp.

== Background ==
The decision of transfer of the sovereignty over Hong Kong in 1997 was finalised by the Chinese and British governments on 18 December 1984 in the Sino-British Joint Declaration. The Declaration stated that the Chinese government would resume the exercise of sovereignty over Hong Kong (including Hong Kong Island, Kowloon, and the New Territories), effective on 1 July 1997, from the British government. Within these declarations, the Hong Kong Special Administrative Region shall be under the direct jurisdiction of the Central People's Government and shall enjoy a high degree of autonomy, except foreign and defense affairs. It shall be allowed to have executive, legislative and independent judicial power, including that of final adjudication.

The colonial government published the Green Paper: the Further Development of Representative Government in Hong Kong on 18 July 1984, decided to carry out democratic reform in Hong Kong. The first indirect Legislative Council election was held in 1985 and direct election was first introduced in the 1991 Legislative Council election, despite the demand of the Hong Kong pro-democracy camp for a fully direct election in 1988 was turned down by the colonial government.

The 1989 Tiananmen Square protests and massacre sparked a great fear towards China among the Hong Kong people. The British Government thus strengthened its resolve to quicken the pace of democratisation, in order to honour its obligation to the Hong Kong people and gracefully retreat from the colony.

In 1992, British prime minister John Major decided that David Wilson should step down as governor of Hong Kong and removed Percy Cradock as foreign policy adviser; they had been criticised by Hong Kong pro-democrats for their appeasement policies toward Beijing. To some observers, these personnel changes signaled that the British government was unhappy with its two prominent officials on Hong Kong affairs and how Sino-British relationship was proceeding.

Chris Patten, the recently defeated Conservative Party chairman was appointed as the 28th governor of Hong Kong and the first politician appointed to the post. The arrival of Chris Patten on 9 July 1992 marked a new phase of the democratic transition.

== Proposal ==
When Chris Patten arrived, the Legislative Council (LegCo) was composed of only 18 directly elected seats from the Geographical Constituencies (GCs), 21 Functional Constituencies (FCs) mostly selected by the powerful elite groups in Hong Kong, 17 members appointed by the governor, 3 ex officio members (namely the chief secretary, attorney general, and financial secretary) and the governor himself as the President of the LegCo.

The electoral method of the 1995 Legislative Council was fixed under the Basic Law, the mini constitution of Hong Kong after 1997, with only 20 directly elected seats from the geographical constituencies, 30 functional constituencies, and 10 seats elected by an election committee. To broaden the democratic structure of LegCo under such a framework, Patten had to find room under the Joint Declaration and the Basic Law.

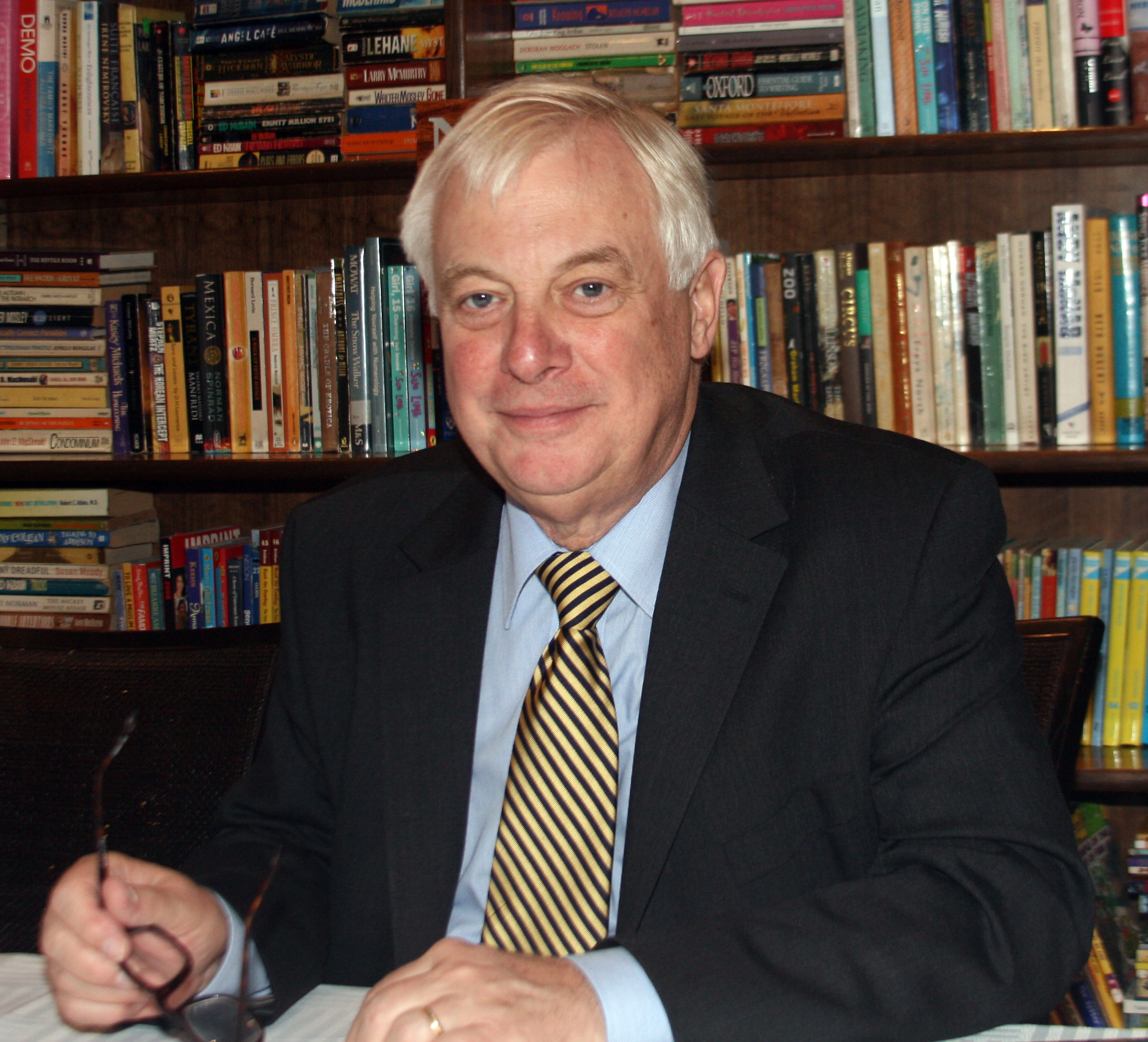
Chris Patten, the last Governor of Hong Kong who took the leading role in the electoral reform.

On 7 October 1992 during his inaugural policy address to the Legislative Council, Chris Patten announced his 1994-95 electoral arrangements. The proposal included:

1. "Single seat, single constituency" measure should be applied in geographical constituency elections including the Legislative Council, Municipal Councils and District Boards;
2. Lowering the minimum voting age from 21 to 18;
3. Abolishing all appointed seats on the District Boards and Municipal Councils;
4. Removing all the restrictions on local delegates to China's National People's Congress to stand for election;
5. Broadening the franchise of certain existing functional constituencies by replacing corporate voting with individual voting;
6. A total of 9 Contemporary functional constituency seats should be brought up so as to let about 2.7 million people have the right to vote; and
7. Introducing an Election Committee of District Board members to return 10 members to the Legislative Council.

In this way, Patten extended the definition of functional constituencies and thus virtually every Hong Kong subject was able to vote for the so-called indirectly elected members of the Legislative Council.

The new nine functional constituencies with much larger eligible electorates that would be created with 2.7 million eligible voters as follows:

1. Primary Production, Power and Construction
2. Textiles and Garment
3. Manufacturing
4. Import and Export
5. Wholesale and Retail
6. Hotels and Catering
7. Transport and Communication
8. Financing, Insurance, Real Estate and Business Services
9. Community, Social and Personal Services

The 2-year PR campaign of the reform was conducted by Michael Hanson, the head of war room of Chris Patten.

== Views ==
=== PRC government ===
The Chinese government treated Patten's unanticipated top-down reforms as a tactic by Western countries to subvert its political system incrementally. Prior to the announcement of the reform package, British foreign secretary Douglas Hurd had given the details of the proposal to PRC foreign minister Qian Qichen. Beijing warned that some aspects of the plan were in violation of the Basic Law, and the legislature elected in 1995 would not travel through the transfer of the sovereignty in 1997 and beyond, so called the "through-train", as Beijing had promised. They emphasised that any arrangements for the 1995 Legislative Council election should be agreed by both sides beforehand. Beijing saw the Patten proposals as direct confrontation.

Beijing made Patten the principal culprit for the trouble and the Chinese propaganda machine singled him out for attack. The Director of Hong Kong and Macao Affairs Office of the State Council of the People's Republic of China, Lu Ping, labelled Patten as "Sinner of a Thousand Years" (Chinese: 千古罪人) at a press conference. In Hong Kong, Xinhua officials used many occasions to criticise Patten. Zheng Guoxiong, Xinhua Hong Kong's deputy director said that:

Patten insisted on confrontation by putting forward his reform proposals. This affected and harmed the prosperity of Hong Kong. Chris Patten did not have any sincerity to cooperate with China. His attitude was thoroughly confrontational, Chris Patten completely ignored the effort and attitude of the Chinese government and he brought harmful effects to the prosperity and stability of Hong Kong. He should be the one who bears all the responsibility.

Zhou Nan, the director of the Xinhua News Agency in Hong Kong called the Patten proposal "triple violations":

More and more Hong Kong people have realised that Patten's political reform package is in serious violation of the Joint Declaration, the Basic Law and the previous agreements reached by Chinese and Britain. They also realised that by walking along this wrong path, Patten has already jeopardised and will continue to jeopardise the prosperity and stability of Hong Kong and a smooth transition. We have already taken and shall take all the necessary measures to maintain the stability and prosperity of Hong Kong, to ensure a smooth transition in 1997 and to protect the long-term interests of Hong Kong people. The only way out for Patten is he should immediately abandon his so-called political reform package and stop playing political tricks.

For the Chinese Communist Party, any significant expansion of the electorate base would render Hong Kong less controllable after 1997. That control had already declined after the 1989 Tiananmen Square protests and massacre in which pro-democracy activists won a historic landslide victory in the 1991 legislative first direct elections on a wave of "anti-China" sentiment.

=== Pro-democracy camp ===
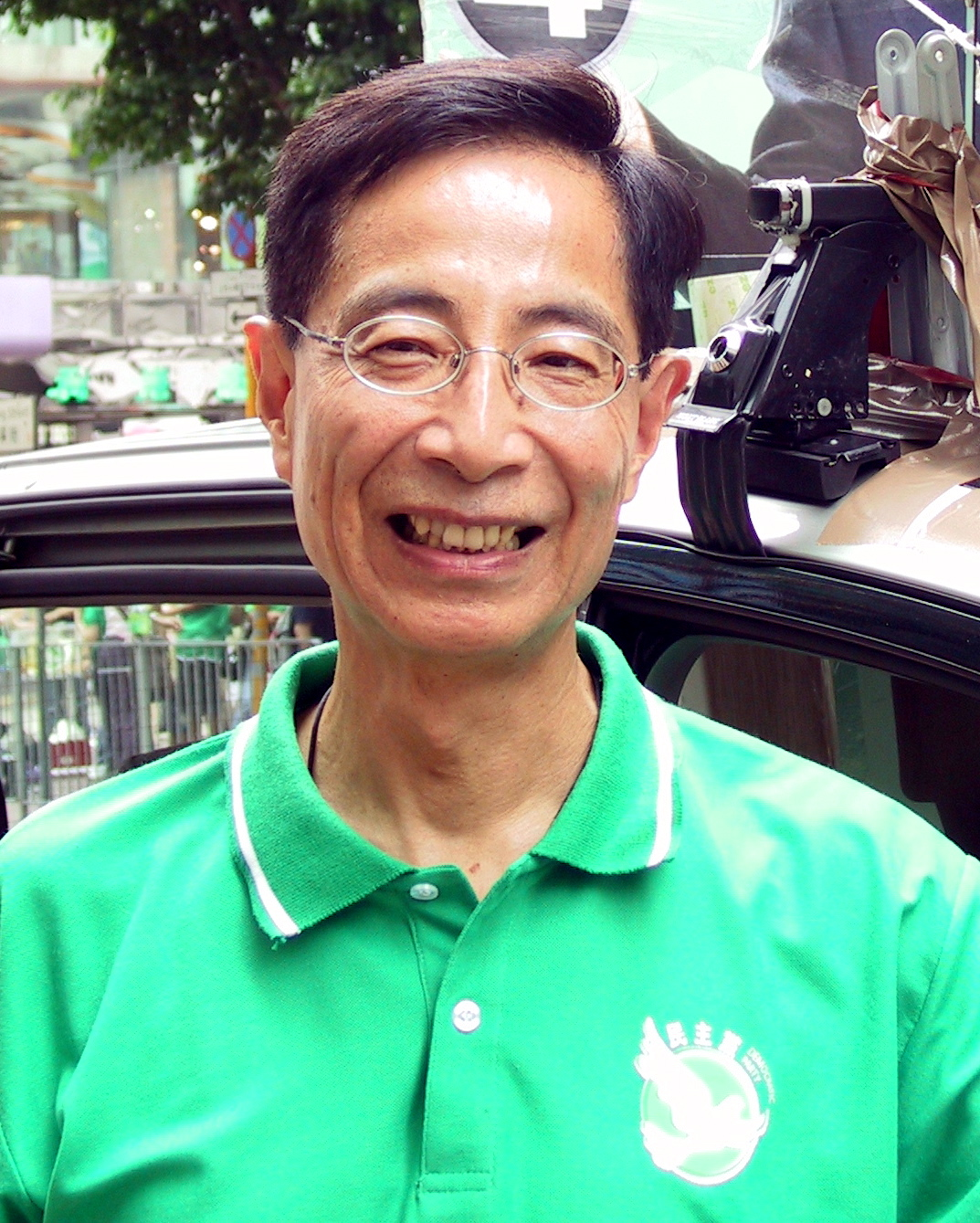
Martin Lee, leader of the pro-democracy camp and supporter of the electoral reform.

The three pro-democratic parties in the Legislative Council, the United Democrats of Hong Kong (UDHK), Meeting Point (MP), and the Association for Democracy and People's Livelihood (ADPL) mostly supported the Patten proposals, even though the United Democrats complained that the reform was too timid to bring real democracy to the Hong Kong people when the proposals were first announced.

The pro-democratic parties had different suggestions for the details of the electoral methods. However, they also desired political stability and smooth transfer of sovereignty as well as to avoid direct confrontation with the Beijing government.

The United Democrats and Meeting Point (later merged into the Democratic Party in 1994) favoured the single-member system. The United Democrats even called for the abolition of 10 seats of the Election Committee and direct election of the 30 legislators, and expanding the franchise of the functional constituencies to cover non-working women, students and retired persons.

Different from the UDHK's suggestion of each vote for the Election Committee and functional constituencies, the ADPL suggested that each citizen should cast one vote for either the functional constituencies or the Election Committee. To avoid a clash with the Beijing government, the party later joined the Beijing-controlled Preparatory Committee and was criticised by some pro-democracy supporters.

Independent legislator Emily Lau and other some other pro-democracy activists was dissatisfied with the relatively conservative stance of the three political parties. She demanded a more radical blueprint of having a full directly elected legislature installed in 1995.

Meeting Point later abstained in the amendment moved by Emily Lau as it thought any infringement of the Basic Law would enrage the PRC government and result in instability and the dismantling of the installed political structure. Although Meeting Point would have liked increased democracy, it did not want to antagonise Beijing unduly.

=== Pro-business faction ===
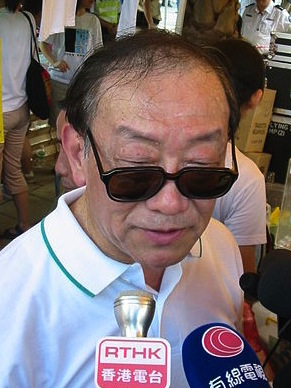
Allen Lee, the leader of the Liberal Party, was the major opponent to the reform proposals in the Legislative Council.

The pro-business party led by Allen Lee in the Legislative Council, who formed the Liberal Party in 1993, followed Beijing's line of opposing the Patten proposals. The party sought to resolve the Sino-Hong Kong confrontation through negotiations.

The conservative Business and Professionals Federation of Hong Kong, led by tycoon Vincent Lo issued a statement in favour of "convergence" with the Basic Law and against the proposals.

=== British community ===
Although British Prime Minister John Major had full support in the Patten's reform package, the former governor of Hong Kong Lord Murray MacLehose, former ambassador to Beijing Percy Cradock, and former Hong Kong chief secretary David Akers-Jones took a public stance against the Patten proposals. They did not want to risk damaging British business interests by antagonising Beijing. Lord MacLehose attacked Patten for spoiling the "cooperative relationship" between Britain and China over Hong Kong and added "such mindless political polarisation cannot be in Hong Kong's interest" on 11 March 1994. Lord Wilson joined MacLehose in a House of Lords debate on 18 May 1994, again criticising Patten's mistake in making China feel "deliberately tricked" over political reform in Hong Kong.

Cradock stood firmly against Patten and criticised him on many occasions, blaming him for damaging the planned road-map which had been endorsed by both the British and Chinese governments. In 1995, Cradock publicly said in an interview that "He [referring to Patten] has made himself so obnoxious to the Chinese", and on a subsequent occasion he described Patten as the "incredible shrinking Governor". Yet, Patten did not remain silent and struck back in a Legislative Council meeting, publicly ridiculing him as a "dyspeptic retired ambassador". From 1992 to 1997, both Cradock and Patten criticised each other on many occasions, putting them on very bad terms.

=== Public opinions ===
Amid the Chinese government's threats, public support for Patten's reform declined intermittently and a polarised public emerged. Opinion surveys revealed that although the majority of the public supported the reform, public support for Chris Patten was stifled by the Chinese government's persistent threats to demolish Hong Kong's political structure in 1997 if the reforms were implemented.

== Sino-British negotiations ==
In February 1993, Douglas Hurd wrote to Qian Qichen for proposing negotiation "without preconditions". On 22 April 1993, the two sides reached an agreement that negotiations would start in Beijing. Jiang Enzhu, the deputy foreign minister represented the PRC side, and Robin McLaren, the British ambassador to China, represented the British side. The two sides held seventeen rounds of talk on the electoral arrangements of the 1994 District Boards and 1995 Legislative Council but failed to reach agreement.

The Sino-British negotiations effectively came to an end when Douglas Hurd wrote to Qian Qichen that Britain had decided to present the Patten proposals to the Hong Kong Legislative Council for scrutiny. Qian replied that it was a matter of principle to China that the opinions of the Hong Kong legislature could not supersede the discussion between the two governments and that if the British did indeed put the Patten proposals to the legislature it would mean a breakdown in bilateral negotiations.

== Legislative voting ==
The Electoral Provisions (Miscellaneous Amendments) (No. 2) Bill 1993 which gives effect to the first four proposed reforms, and the Legislative Council (Electoral Provisions) (Amendment) Bill 1994 which gives effect to the last three proposed reforms in the Legislative Council, were passed on 24 February 1994 and 29 June 1994 respectively, despite Lu Ping making phone calls to lobby legislators to abstain or vote against the Patten proposals.

There were fourteen amendments to Patten's bill. Allen Lee's Liberal Party and its allies tried to amend the Patten proposals by proposing the restriction of the franchise in one functional constituency to a maximum of 153 senior executives. Lu Ping instructed his allies on LegCo to support Allen Lee's amendment. Legislator Vincent Cheng, the board member of the Hongkong and Shanghai Banking Corporation, was pressured by the chairman of the bank Sir William Purves to vote for the Liberal amendment. Nonetheless, the Liberal Party's amendment was defeated by 28 to 29 votes, a mere majority of one vote, on 29 June 1994, with the help of the three ex officio votes.

Emily Lau's amendment of a universal suffrage for the 1995 Legislative Council Election, supported by the United Democrats and ADPL, was also defeated by 20 to 21 votes, with the margin of one vote after four Meeting Point legislators abstained.

The details of the legislative voting on the Liberal Party's amendment, Emily Lau's universal suffrage amendment, and Chris Patten's electoral bill are listed as follows, the name order is in accordance to the LegCo precedence list:

Selection method	Capacity or Constituency	Member	Party	Liberal amendment	Lau amendment	Patten bill
AP	President	John Joseph Swaine	Independent	Present	Present	Present
EO	Chief Secretary	Anson Chan	Nonpartisan	✗ No	✗ No	✓ Yes
EO	Financial Secretary	Nathaniel W. H. Macleod	Nonpartisan	✗ No	✗ No	✓ Yes
EO	Attorney General	Jeremy Fell Mathews	Nonpartisan	✗ No	✗ No	✓ Yes
AP	Appointed	Allen Lee	Liberal	✓ Yes	✗ No	✗ No
AP	Appointed	Selina Chow	Liberal	✓ Yes	✗ No	✗ No
FC	Social Services	Hui Yin-fat	Independent	✗ No	✓ Yes	✓ Yes
GC	Hong Kong Island East	Martin Lee	United Democrats	✗ No	✓ Yes	✓ Yes
FC	Finance	David Li	Independent	✓ Yes	Absent	Absent
FC	Industrial (Second)	Ngai Shiu-kit	Liberal	✓ Yes	Absent	✗ No
FC	Labour	Pang Chun-hoi	TUC	✗ No	✓ Yes	✓ Yes
GC	Kowloon East	Szeto Wah	United Democrats	✗ No	✓ Yes	✓ Yes
FC	Labour	Tam Yiu-chung	FTU	✓ Yes	Absent	✗ No
GC	New Territories East	Andrew Wong	Independent	✗ No	✗ No	✓ Yes
FC	Rural	Lau Wong-fat	Liberal	✓ Yes	Absent	✗ No
FC	Architectural, Surveying and Planning	Edward Ho	Liberal	✓ Yes	✗ No	✗ No
FC	Real Estate and Construction	Ronald Joseph Arculli	Liberal	✓ Yes	✗ No	✗ No
AP	Appointed	Martin Gilbert Barrow	Breakfast	Abstain	Abstain	Abstain
AP	Appointed	Peggy Lam	Independent	✓ Yes	Absent	Abstain
AP	Appointed	Miriam Lau	Liberal	✓ Yes	✗ No	✗ No
AP	Appointed	Lau Wah-sum	Liberal	✓ Yes	✗ No	✗ No
FC	Medical	Leong Che-hung	Meeting Point/Breakfast	✗ No	Abstain	✓ Yes
FC	Commercial (First)	James David McGregor	HKDF	✗ No	✓ Yes	✓ Yes
FC	Urban Council	Elsie Tu	Independent	✓ Yes	✗ No	✗ No
FC	Accountancy	Peter Wong	Liberal	✓ Yes	✗ No	✗ No
GC	New Territories South	Albert Chan	United Democrats	✗ No	✓ Yes	✓ Yes
AP	Appointed	Vincent Cheng	Independent	✓ Yes	✗ No	✓ Yes
AP	Appointed	Moses Cheng	Liberal	✓ Yes	✗ No	✗ No
AP	Appointed	Marvin Cheung	Breakfast	✓ Yes	✗ No	✗ No
FC	Teaching	Cheung Man-kwong	United Democrats	✗ No	✓ Yes	✓ Yes
FC	Financial Services	Chim Pui-chung	Independent	✓ Yes	Absent	✗ No
GC	New Territories North	Fung Chi-wood	United Democrats	✗ No	✓ Yes	✓ Yes
GC	Kowloon West	Frederick Fung	ADPL	✗ No	✓ Yes	✓ Yes
AP	Appointed	Timothy Ha	Independent	✗ No	Absent	✓ Yes
FC	Health	Michael Ho	United Democrats	✗ No	✓ Yes	✓ Yes
GC	Hong Kong Island West	Huang Chen-ya	United Democrats	✗ No	✓ Yes	✓ Yes
FC	Legal	Simon Ip	Breakfast	Abstain	✗ No	✓ Yes
AP	Appointed	Lam Kui-chun	Liberal	✓ Yes	Absent	✗ No
GC	Kowloon Central	Conrad Lam	United Democrats	✗ No	✓ Yes	✓ Yes
GC	Kowloon Central	Lau Chin-shek	United Democrats	✗ No	✓ Yes	✓ Yes
GC	New Territories East	Emily Lau	Independent	✗ No	✓ Yes	✗ No
GC	New Territories South	Lee Wing-tat	United Democrats	✗ No	✓ Yes	✓ Yes
AP	Appointed	Eric Li	Breakfast	✓ Yes	✗ No	✓ Yes
GC	Kowloon East	Fred Li	Meeting Point	✗ No	Abstain	✓ Yes
GC	Hong Kong Island East	Man Sai-cheong	United Democrats	✗ No	✓ Yes	✓ Yes
AP	Appointed	Steven Poon	Liberal	✓ Yes	✗ No	✗ No
AP	Appointed	Henry Tang	Liberal	✓ Yes	Absent	✗ No
GC	New Territories North	Tik Chi-yuen	Meeting Point	✗ No	Abstain	✓ Yes
GC	Kowloon West	James To	United Democrats	✗ No	✓ Yes	✓ Yes
FC	Engineering	Samuel Wong	Breakfast	✓ Yes	Absent	✓ Yes
FC	Commercial (Second)	Philip Wong	NHKA	✓ Yes	✗ No	✗ No
GC	Hong Kong Island West	Yeung Sum	United Democrats	✗ No	✓ Yes	✓ Yes
FC	Tourism	Howard Young	Liberal	✓ Yes	✗ No	✗ No
GC	New Territories West	Wong Wai-yin	Meeting Point	✗ No	Abstain	✓ Yes
GC	New Territories West	Tang Siu-tong	Independent	✓ Yes	Absent	✗ No
AP	Appointed	Christine Loh	Independent	✗ No	✓ Yes	✓ Yes
AP	Appointed	Roger Luk	Independent	Absent	✗ No	✗ No
AP	Appointed	Anna Wu	Independent	✗ No	✓ Yes	✓ Yes
FC	Industrial (First)	James Tien	Liberal	✓ Yes	Absent	✗ No
FC	Regional Council	Alfred Tso	LDF	✓ Yes	Absent	✗ No
Result				✗ Fail (28–29)	✗ Fail (20–21)	✓ Pass (32–24)

== Aftermath ==
The pro-democracy camp experienced the largest victories in the elections following Patten's reform. District Board elections were held on 18 September 1994 under Patten's reform rules. The newly established Democratic Party won the largest block with 75 seats in 18 District Boards. The Democratic Party won 23 of the 59 seats in the municipal elections on 9 March 1995, combining with other democratic parties to control both the Urban Council and Regional Council. On 17 September 1995, the pro-democracy camp won another landslide victory in the fully elected Legislative Council election.

After the Patten proposals were passed, Beijing decided to create the Preliminary Working Committee (PWC) on 16 July 1993. Although it was seen by some that such a body was necessary in order to prepare for the transition of sovereignty, the row over the Patten proposals enabled Beijing to issue a warning that unilateral action would result in the setting-up of a "second stove" and, when it was formed, to say it was an unfortunate product of British confrontation.

The Preliminary Working Committee was dissolved in December 1995 and succeeded by the Preparatory Committee in 1996. The Preparatory Committee was responsible for implementation work related to the establishment of the HKSAR, including the establishment of the Selection Committee, which in turn was responsible for the selection of the first chief executive and the members of the Provisional Legislative Council which replaced the Legislative Council elected in 1995. The Provisional Legislative Council reverted most of the Patten's reform, by resuming appointed seats to the District Councils, Urban Council and Regional Council, reintroducing corporate voting in some functional constituencies, narrowing the franchise of the nine new functional constituencies to about 20,000 voters, and changed the "single seat, single constituency" method to the proportional representation system for the Legislative Council elections.

Despite the eventual reversal of the electoral system, Patten's reform significantly impacted the Hong Kong political landscape by polarising Hong Kong politics.

== Timeline ==
The events related to the electoral reform went on as follows:

=== 1992 ===
- 9 July – Chris Patten arrives in Hong Kong as the last colonial governor.
- 7 October – The Governor announces plans for the 1994-95 electoral arrangements in his inaugural policy address to the Legislative Council, provoking severe criticism from Beijing.
- 16 October – Premier Li Peng criticises Governor Patten's electoral reform proposal.
- 23 October – Lu Ping states that China will set up HKSAR organs unilaterally if Britain deviates from agreed convergence with the Basic Law.
- 16 November – The British cabinet expresses full support for the Patten reform. PRC vice premier Zhu Rongji comments in London that if Patten proceeds with reform, China might as well abandon the 1984 Joint Declaration.
- 30 November – Beijing threatens to invalidate all Hong Kong government contracts extending beyond July 1997 if they lack prior Chinese approval.

=== 1993 ===
- 1 February – Zhou Nan, chief PRC representative in Hong Kong denounces the British for "triple violations" of bilateral agreements on electoral reform and transitional matters.
- 12 March – After four postponements, Governor Patten announces the new electoral bill when Beijing fails to set a time for bilateral talks on electoral arrangements.
- 15–16 March – Li Peng in his NPC report attacks Patten for violating Sino-British accords. Lu Ping condemns Patten as the "sinner of a millennium" and warns that China will set up its own separate organs for the new HKSAR.
- 22 April – Sino-British talks begin in Beijing on the arrangements for the 1994-95 elections in Hong Kong. The talks last for 17 rounds until December 1993.
- 22 June – Beijing names 27 mainland officials and 30 Hong Kong residents to the Preliminary Working Committee (PWC) as a predecessor to the HKSAR Preparatory Committee to be set up in 1996 to oversee final phase of sovereignty transfer and HKSAR establishment.
- 16 July – The PWC is inaugurated in Beijing by its chair, PRC foreign minister Qian Qichen.
- 19 October – Lu Ping reiterates Beijing's warning that Hong Kong should not become a political city but must remain only an economic hub.
- 27 November – Sino-British talks on Hong Kong elections end without agreement.
- 10 December – Patten announces the first part of his electoral bill, which is later presented to the LegCo, provoking condemnation from PRC officials.
- 27 December – Beijing announces it will dismantle colonial Hong Kong's three tiers of elected representation in July upon the HKSAR's establishment.

=== 1994 ===
- 18 February – Sino-British dispute breaks out over London's publication of its account of the unsuccessful 17 rounds of talks on Hong Kong electoral reform.
- 23 February – The LegCo approves the first part of Patten reforms: voting age at 18, single-seat, single-vote for all elections, no more appointed District Board or LegCo members.
- 13 March – Zhou Nan claims that even without British cooperation, China will be able to maintain Hong Kong's prosperity and ability beyond 1997 but will not tolerate its "internationalisation."
- 30 June – The Legislative Council (Electoral Provisions) (Amendment) Bill 1994 is passed in the Legislative Council in a 32 to 24 vote.
- 18 September – District Board elections are held under Patten's reform rules. The Democratic Party wins the largest block with 75 seats in 18 District Boards.
- 23 December – Zhou Nan denounces Governor Patten for his refusal to cooperate with the PWC, which has no legal standing under the Basic Law.

=== 1995 ===
- 1 February – PRC officials in Hong Kong urge local patriots to stand for the September LegCo elections in preparation for the 1997 retrocession.
- 9 March – The Democratic Party wins 23 of the 59 seats in the Urban and Regional Council elections.
- 17 September – Elections for Hong Kong's first fully elected Legislative Council are held; 26 percent of the 2.57 million registered voters turn out at the poll.
- 8 December – Beijing dissolved the PWC and appoints a Preparatory Committee (94 Hong Kong residents among 150 members) to establish HKSAR organs.

=== 1996 ===
- 26 January – The HKSAR Preparatory Committee holds its first full session in Beijing.
- 4 March 1996 – The Preparatory Committee votes to replace the LegCo with an appointed Provisional Legislative Council (PLC) on 1 July 1997.
- 25 September – Beijing releases the full list of 5,791 candidates for the 400 seats on the Selection Committee, holding a first ballot for the chief executive.
- 11 December – Shipping tycoon and former ExCo member Tung Chee-hwa gains 320 votes from the 400-strong Selection Committee to become the first HKSAR chief executive. A week later, Premier Li Peng confirms Tung's appointment as HKSAR chief executive for a five-year term from 1 July 1997.
- 21 December – The Selection Committee meets in Shenzhen to decide the membership of the 60-seat PLC.

=== 1997 ===
- 25 January – The PLC meets in Shenzhen; as an extraconstitutional body, it cannot legally function in Hong Kong before 1 July 1997.
- 27 June – Last meeting of the LegCo is held. The LegCo is dissolved and replaced by PLC after 30 June 1997.
- 30 June–1 July – The Ceremonies of the handover of Hong Kong is held and the HKSAR established.

== See also ==
- 2010 Hong Kong electoral reform
- Democratic development in Hong Kong
- 1995 Hong Kong legislative election
- 1994 Hong Kong local elections
- 1995 Hong Kong municipal elections
- Legislative Council of Hong Kong
- Provisional Legislative Council
- Transfer of sovereignty over Hong Kong

== Bibliography ==
- Dimbleby, Jonathan (1997). The last governor: Chris Patten & the handover of Hong Kong. London: Little, Brown and Company. ISBN 0316640182.
- Loh, Christine (2010). Underground front. Hong Kong University Press. ISBN 9789622099968.
- Sing, Ming (2004). Hong Kong's Tortuous Democratization: A Comparative Analysis. Routledge. ISBN 0203180402.
