= Co-operative Resources Centre =

Co-operative Resources Centre 啟聯資源中心
- Convenor: Allen Lee
- Founded: 12 December 1991
- Dissolved: 31 March 1993
- Succeeded by: Liberal Party
- Headquarters: Rm 1604, Hong Kong Club, 3A Chater Road, Central, Hong Kong
- Ideology: Conservatism (Hong Kong); Economic liberalism
- Political position: Centre-right

The Co-operative Resources Centre (CRC; Chinese: 啟聯資源中心) was a short-lived political group in the Legislative Council of Hong Kong (LegCo). Led by the Senior Unofficial Member of the Executive and Legislative Councils Allen Lee, it was established on 12 December 1991 by a group of 21 appointed and indirectly elected Legislative Council members from the functional constituencies. It became the largest conservative faction in the legislature countering the pro-democracy United Democrats of Hong Kong (UDHK) won a landslide victory in the first direct Legislative Council election in 1991. In 1993, it was transformed into the Liberal Party.

== History ==
=== Foundation ===
After the first ever direct election for the Legislative Council of Hong Kong (LegCo) in September 1991, the pro-democracy United Democrats of Hong Kong (UDHK) swept the polls and became the largest party in the legislature.

The group of conservative elites in the legislature who were either appointed by the governor or indirectly elected through the functional constituencies shared a dislike for the United Democrats. Four of the Legislative Council members, Allen Lee, Selina Chow, Rita Fan and Edward Ho had also been appointed members of the Executive Council (ExCo). To curb the influence of liberals, 21 conservative legislators formed the CRC as a think tank, research unit and brain trust for a future political group on the 16th floor of the Hong Kong Club in Central.

Led by the Senior Unofficial Member Allen Lee and his fellow LegCo colleagues, Steven Poon, Selina Chow and Stephen Cheong, 12 legislators appointed by the British colonial government and 8 legislators indirectly elected by the functional constituencies aligned themselves. Being the convenor of the group, Allen Lee and stood down as the Senior Unofficial Member of the Legislative Council to avoid a conflict of interest. Within a month, CRC had secured 17 of the 32 convenor and deputy convenor posts of the Legislative Council panels. By January 1992, the group issued a joint statement stating that "members agree at this point the CRC is not a political party but a political entity formed by a group of legislators in order to serve the people of Hongkong better."

=== Changes in membership ===
By July, two founders, engineering Samuel Wong and appointed member Vincent Cheng left the group. In October, Professor Felice Lieh Mak quit the group and she was appointed to the Executive Council. On 7 October 1992, all four CRC members in the Executive Council, Rita Fan and Allen Lee, Selina Chow and Edward Ho were dumped from the Council by governor Chris Patten as the governor wanted devoid of party politics. Rita Fan quit Executive and Legislative Councils as well as the CRC on the same day.

=== Transforming into Liberal Party ===
In mid 1992, the CRC set up a working group to look at forming a political party with other like-minded organisations. The CRC had courted groups such as the Business and Professionals Federation of Hong Kong consisting of about 150 members, mostly highly successful businessmen or companies, the Liberal Democratic Federation of Hong Kong with about 150 members and the rural powerbrokers in the Heung Yee Kuk consisting of 155 members representing about 300,000 indigenous New Territories residents.

The CRC ceased to function in March 1993 after an 18-month lifespan and some 14 CRC legislators joined the Liberal Party officially formed on 6 June 1993.

== List of members ==
Convenor

- Allen Lee Peng-fei

Legislative Councillors:

- Allen Lee
- Stephen Cheong
- Selina Chow
- Rita Fan
- Ngai Shiu-kit
- Lau Wong-fat
- Edward Ho
- Ronald Joseph Arculli
- Peggy Lam
- Miriam Lau
- Lau Wah-sum
- Samuel Wong
- Vincent Cheng
- Peter Wong
- Moses Cheng
- Lam Kui-chun
- Gilbert Leung
- Steven Poon
- Felice Lieh Mak
- Henry Tang
- Howard Young

Regional Councillors:

- Gilbert Leung
- Lau Wong-fat

District Board members:

- Peggy Lam (Wan Chai)
- Lau Wong-fat (Tuen Mun)

Heung Yee Kuk:

- Lau Wong-fat
