= 1991 Hong Kong municipal elections =

- 5 May 1991

15 (of the 40) seats to the Urban Council 12 (of the 26) seats to the Regional Council
- Registered: 1,822,443 ▲13.62%
- Turnout: 393,764 (23.14%) ▲5.54pp
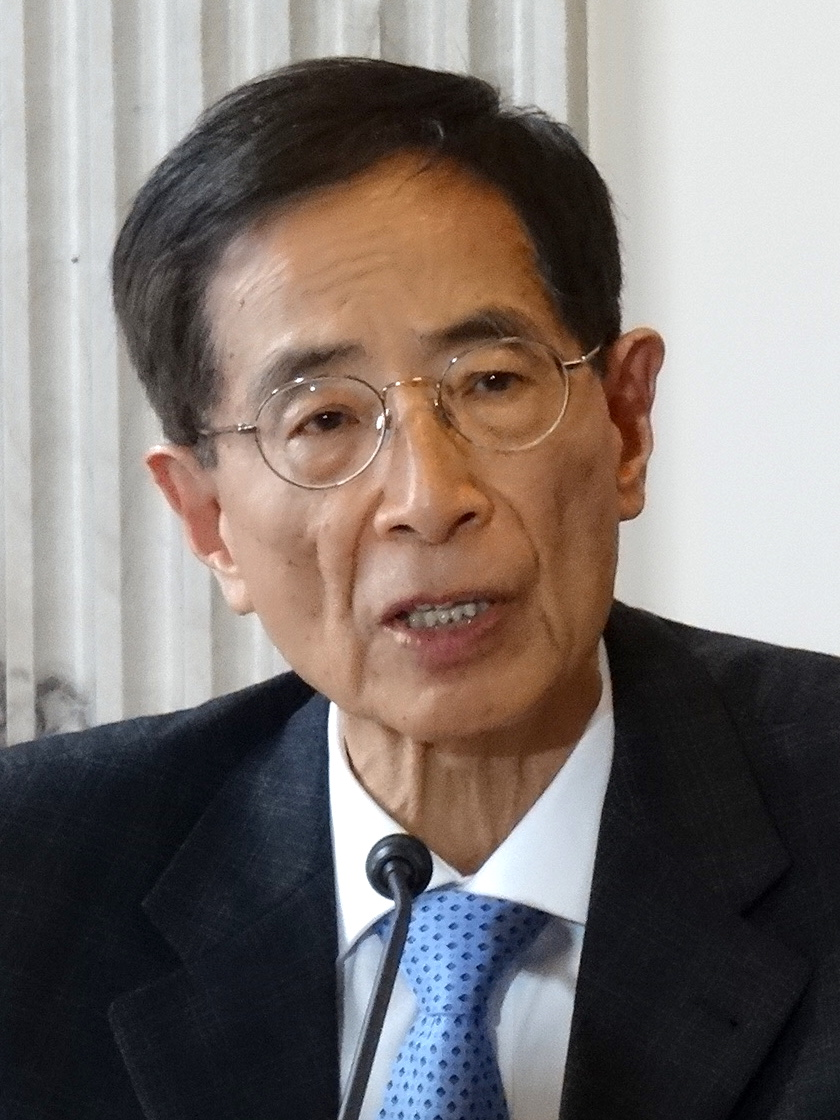

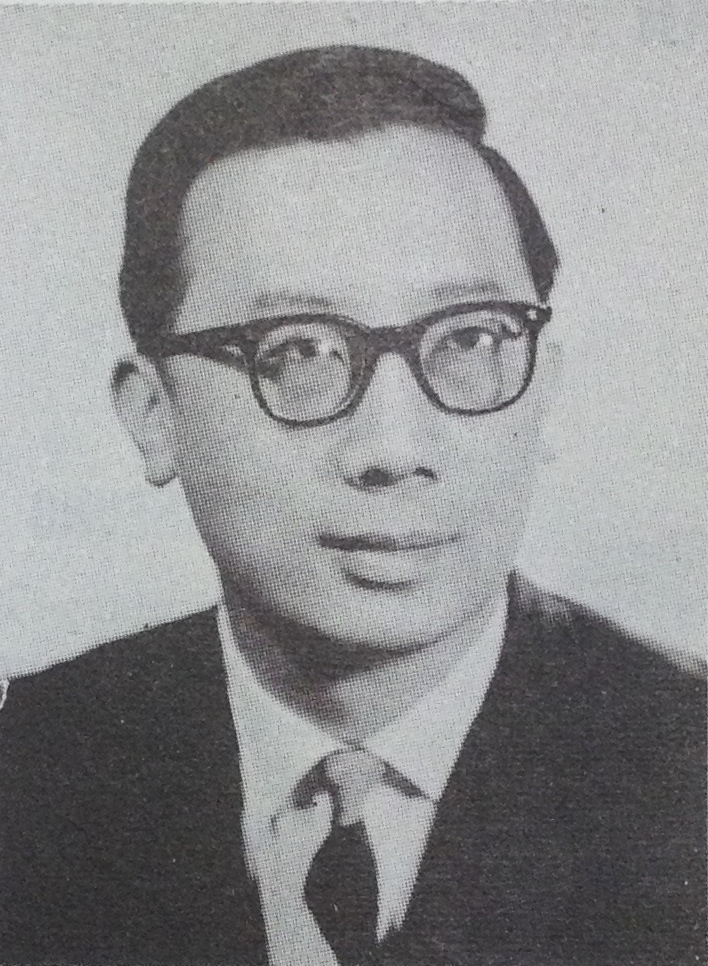

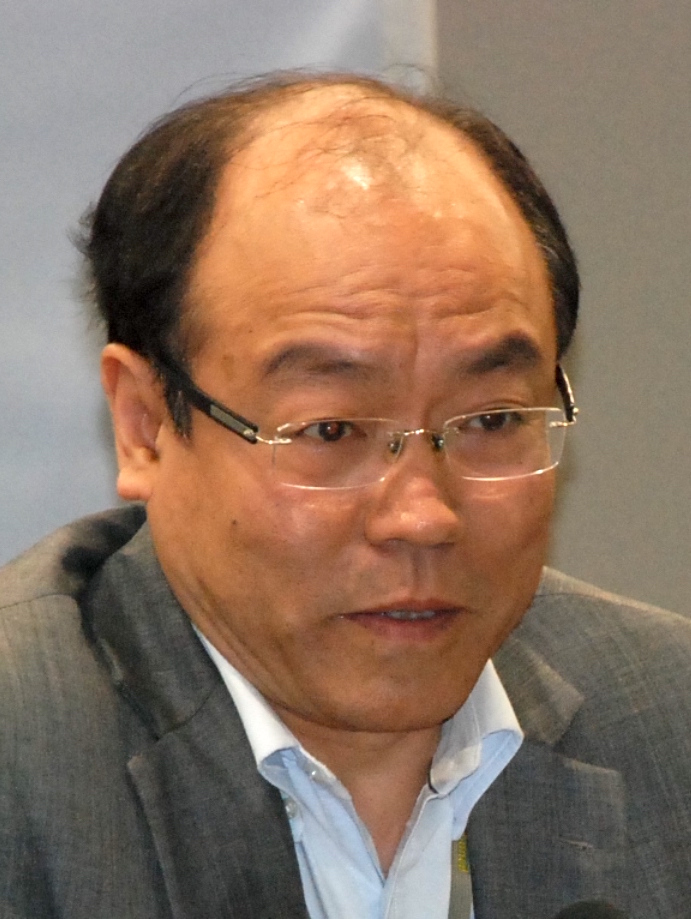

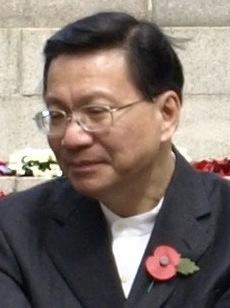
	First party	Second party	Third party
Leader	Martin Lee	Hu Fa-kuang	Hilton Cheong-Leen
Party	United Democrats	LDF	Civic
Last election	New party	New party	4 seats, 7.18%
Seats before	5	2	3
Seats won	5 UC; 6 RC	2 UC; 1 RC	2 UC —
Seat change	▲6	▲1	▼2
Popular vote	146,229	39,139	22,048
Percentage	37.33%	9.99%	5.63%
Swing	N/A	N/A	▼1.55pp
	Fourth party	Fifth party	Sixth party
Leader	Frederick Fung	Brook Bernacchi	Anthony Cheung
Party	ADPL	Reform	Meeting Point
Last election	4 seats, 9.99%	2 seats, 6.31%	2 seats, 10.21%
Seats before	2	2	0
Seats won	2 UC —	2 UC —	1 UC —
Seat change	Steady	Steady	▲1
Popular vote	21,033	9,045	12,476
Percentage	5.37%	2.31%	3.18%
Swing	▼4.62pp	▼4.00pp	▼7.03pp
Chairmen before election
Hugh Forsgate (UC)
Cheung Yan-lung (RC)
Elected Chairmen
Ronald Leung (UC)
Lam Wai-keung (RC)

The 1991 Hong Kong Urban Council and Regional Council elections were the municipal elections held on 5 May 1991 for the elected seats of the Urban Council and Regional Council respectively. The election saw the direct rivalry between the newly established political parties, the liberal United Democrats of Hong Kong (UDHK) and the conservative Liberal Democratic Federation of Hong Kong (LDFHK) which the liberal forces won a landslide victory.

== Overview ==
For the Urban Council, 15 seats were the directly elected by the general residents and ten seats were elected by the Hong Kong Island and Kowloon District Boards members and 15 appointed by the Governor. For the Regional Council, 12 seats were directly elected and nine seats were elected by the New Territories District Boards members, with 12 appointed members and three ex officio members of the chairman and two vice-chairmen of the Heung Yee Kuk. The first-past-the-post voting system was in use.

The elections were one of the three elections in the year, which came after the March District Board elections and before the September Legislative Council election in which direct elections would be introduced for the first time. Major political forces realigned themselves on the eve of the elections. The liberal pro-democracy activists and professionals came together as the United Democrats of Hong Kong (UDHK) in preparation for the elections in April 1990, while the conservative pro-business forces founded the Liberal Democratic Federation of Hong Kong (LDFHK) in November 1990 to counter the pro-democracy forces. The United Democrats became the biggest winner in the District Board elections, sweeping 52 seats, as compared to LDF's 24 seats. It was seen as the rehearsals of those parties for the more important Legislative Council election in September.

A total number of 59 candidates contested for 25 seats, excluding the two uncontested seats in each councils. 392,496 electorates cast their votes, which counted more than 23.3 per cent of the total registered voters, about six per cent higher than the elections in 1989. Four of the contesting incumbents were defeated including Peter Chan Chi-kwan who had served for 22 years. The two-term incumbent Wong Shui-sang was also defeated by Gilbert Leung Kam-ho.

The two newly established political parties, the liberal pro-democracy United Democrats, and its allies, and the conservative pro-business Liberal Democratic Federation, with the support of the older grassroots organisation Hong Kong Civic Association, contested heavily in the districts like North Point, Southern District, Kowloon City East, Wong Tai Sin South, Tuen Mun West and Tai Po. The United Democrats won 11 seats as result, more than one-third in each council, including Sha Tin where Lau Kong-wah and Wong Hon-chung both won a seat in preparation for contesting the Legislative Council direct election in September, while the LDF won only three seats.

== Results ==
Overall Summary of the 5 May 1991 Urban Council and Regional Council of Hong Kong election results
Political Affiliation	Urban Council			Regional Council			Total		
Political Affiliation	Popular votes	Standing	Elected	Popular votes	Standing	Elected	Popular votes	%	Total seats gained
United Democrats of Hong Kong	66,928	8	5	79,301	7	6	146,229	37.33	11
Liberal Democratic Federation of Hong Kong	27,730	4	2	11,409	3	1	39,139	9.99	3
Hong Kong Civic Association	22,048	5	2	-	-	-	22,048	5.63	2
Hong Kong Association for Democracy and People's Livelihood	21,033	2	2	-	-	-	21,033	5.37	2
Reform Club of Hong Kong	9,045	2	2	-	-	-	9,045	2.31	2
Meeting Point	12,476	1	1	-	-	-	12,476	3.18	1
Individuals and others	82,446	18	1	86,442	14	5	168,888	43.11	6
Total	214,597	37	15	177,152	24	12	391,749	100.00	27

Note: Some of the candidates with multiple affiliations are overlapped in this chart.

== Result breakdown ==
=== Urban Council ===
District	Constituency	Candidates	Affiliation	Votes	%
Central & Western	Central & Western	1 Wong Sui-lai	United Democrats	9,327	55.62
Central & Western	Central & Western	2 Chan Tak-chor	Independent	7,442	44.38
Wan Chai	Wan Chai	1 San Stephen Wong Hon-ching	Independent	4,714	51.38
Wan Chai	Wan Chai	2 Susanna Yeung Wan-king	United Democrats	4,460	48.62
Eastern	North Point	1 Man Sai-cheong	United Democrats	12,177	69.56
Eastern	North Point	2 Wong Tak-lun	LDF/Civic	4,040	23.08
Eastern	North Point	3 Au Yuk-lun	Independent	1,289	7.36
Eastern	Shau Kei Wan	1 Brook Bernacchi	Reform	9,045	52.92
Eastern	Shau Kei Wan	2 Joseph Lai Chi-keong	United Democrats	4,178	24.45
Eastern	Shau Kei Wan	3 Chiu Kin-man	Independent	3,868	22.63
Southern	Southern	1 Yeung Chui-chun	Independent	4,743	18.95
Southern	Southern	2 Joseph Chan Yuek-sut	LDF/Civic	10,593	42.32
Southern	Southern	3 Ho Chun-yan	United Democrats	9,693	38.73
Kowloon City	Kowloon City West	1 Chiang Sai-cheong	United Democrats	6,686	53.26
Kowloon City	Kowloon City West	2 Peter Chan Chi-kwan	Civic	5,868	46.74
Kowloon City	Kowloon City East	1 Pao Ping-wing	LDF	6,372	52.84
Kowloon City	Kowloon City East	2 Wong Ho-kei	Independent	546	4.92
Kowloon City	Kowloon City East	3 Tsang Kin-shing	ASPDMC	4,187	37.70
Kwun Tong	Kwun Tong West	1 Elsie Tu	Independent	14,556	54.63
Kwun Tong	Kwun Tong West	2 Lee Chun-ming	Independent	765	2.87
Kwun Tong	Kwun Tong West	3 Chan Kam-lam	Independent	11,325	42.50
Kwun Tong	Kwun Tong East	1 Li Wah-ming	Meeting Point/UD	12,476	60.74
Kwun Tong	Kwun Tong East	2 Wong Ping-kuen	Independent	8,064	39.26
Mong Kok	Mong Kok	1 Chan Kwok-ming	Independent	4,475	51.32
Mong Kok	Mong Kok	2 Law Wing-cheung	Independent	3,339	38.30
Mong Kok	Mong Kok	3 Kung Po-chuk	Civic	905	10.38
Sham Shui Po	Sham Shui Po East	1 Frederick Fung Kin-kee	ADPL	9,944	88.41
Sham Shui Po	Sham Shui Po East	2 Lee Yau-wai	Independent	1,304	11.59
Sham Shui Po	Sham Shui Po West	1 Ma Lee-wo	United Democrats	7,931	56.68
Sham Shui Po	Sham Shui Po West	2 Wong Kuen-wai	Independent	6,062	43.32
Wong Tai Sin	Wong Tai Sin South	1 Mok Ying-fan	ADPL	11,089	62.25
Wong Tai Sin	Wong Tai Sin South	2 Wong Kam-chi	LDF	6,725	37.75
Wong Tai Sin	Wong Tai Sin North	1 Cecilia Yeung Lai-yin	Reform	uncontested	
Yau Tsim	Yau Tsim	1 Daniel Wong Kwok-tung	Independent	3,028	47.25
Yau Tsim	Yau Tsim	2 Tong Chor-yin	Independent	2,568	40.07
Yau Tsim	Yau Tsim	3 Yu Hon-piu	Independent	171	2.67
Yau Tsim	Yau Tsim	4 Wu Yan-yu	Civic	642	10.02

=== Regional Council ===
District	Constituency	Candidate	Affiliation	Votes	%
Islands	Islands	1 Kwong Kwok-kam	Independent	2,822	41.84
Islands	Islands	2 Fung Puk-tai	Independent	3,922	58.16
North	North	1 Cheung Hon-chung	LDF	uncontested	
Sai Kung	Sai Kung	1 Wong Shui-sang	Independent	3,604	47.89
Sai Kung	Sai Kung	2 Glibert Leung Kam-ho	Independent (FSHK)	3,922	52.11
Sha Tin	Sha Tin East	1 Lee York-fai	Independent	462	1.98
Sha Tin	Sha Tin East	2 Wong Hon-chung	United Democrats	11,475	49.21
Sha Tin	Sha Tin East	3 Tony Kan Chung-nin	Independent	11,381	48.81
Sha Tin	Sha Tin West	1 Lau Kong-wah	United Democrats	16,755	77.40
Sha Tin	Sha Tin West	2 Wai Hing-cheung	Independent	4,893	22.60
Tai Po	Tai Po	1 Cheng Chun-ping	LDF	7,673	43.26
Tai Po	Tai Po	2 Fung Chi-wood	United Democrats	10,064	56.74
Tsuen Wan	Tsuen Wan	1 Albert Chan Wai-yip	United Democrats	13,232	63.89
Tsuen Wan	Tsuen Wan	2 Ip Yeung Fuk-lan	Independent	7,478	36.11
Tuen Mun	Tuen Mun East	1 Alfred Tso Shiu-wai	Independent (FSHK)	7,975	67.70
Tuen Mun	Tuen Mun East	2 Ng Wai-cho	United Democrats	3,805	32.30
Tuen Mun	Tuen Mun West	1 Ng Ming-yum	United Democrats	14,010	78.95
Tuen Mun	Tuen Mun West	2 Philip Li Koi-hop	LDF	3,736	21.05
Yuen Long	Yuen Long	1 Ngan Kam-chuen	Independent	10,003	66.89
Yuen Long	Yuen Long	2 Chan Yat-tung	Independent	4,952	33.11
Kwai Tsing	Kwai Chung East	1 Chow Yick-hay	United Democrats	9,960	77.87
Kwai Tsing	Kwai Chung East	Lee Wing-kin	Independent	2,830	22.13
Kwai Tsing	Kwai Chung West & Tsing Yi	1 Ting Yin-wah	Independent (TYCG)	13,154	69.45
Kwai Tsing	Kwai Chung West & Tsing Yi	2 Sarena Young Fuk-ki	Independent	5,787	30.55
