= Hong Kong Island East (1991 constituency) =

- Former Geographical constituency for the Legislative Council of Hong Kong
- Boundary of Hong Kong Island East in Hong Kong
- District: Eastern District; Wan Chai District
- Region: Hong Kong Island
- Electorate: 261,573

Former constituency
- Created: 1991
- Abolished: 1995
- Number of members: Two
- Replaced by: Hong Kong Island Central; Hong Kong Island East; Hong Kong Island South

Hong Kong Island East was a geographical constituency in the election for the Legislative Council of Hong Kong in 1991, which elects two members of the Legislative Council using the dual-seat constituency dual vote system. The constituency covers Eastern District and Wan Chai District on Hong Kong Island.

The constituency was divided and replaced by the Hong Kong Island Central, Hong Kong Island East, and Hong Kong Island South constituencies in 1995.

== Returned members ==
Elected members are as follows:

Election	Member	Party	Member	Party
1991	Martin Lee	UDHK	Man Sai-cheong	UDHK
1994	Martin Lee	Democratic	Man Sai-cheong	Democratic

== Election results ==
1991 Legislative Council election: Hong Kong Island East
Party	Candidate	Votes	%	±%
United Democrats	Martin Lee Chu-ming	76,831	40.19	
United Democrats	Man Sai-cheong	43,615	22.81	
Citizen Forum	Cheng Kai-nam	29,902	15.64	
HKDF	Chan Ying-lun	19,806	10.36	
Independent	Diana Leung Wai-tung	15,230	7.97	
Independent	Jennifer Chow Kit-bing	5,805	3.04	
Turnout		103,028	39.39	
Registered electors		261,573		
United Democrats win (new seat)				
United Democrats win (new seat)				
