= Kowloon South (1995 constituency) =

Constituency of the Hong Kong Legislative Council

- Former Geographical constituency for the Legislative Council of Hong Kong
- Boundary of Kowloon South in Hong Kong
- District: Kowloon City District
- Region: Kowloon
- Electorate: 105,597

Former constituency
- Created: 1995
- Abolished: 1997
- Created from: Kowloon Central
- Replaced by: Kowloon West

Kowloon South was a geographical constituency in the election for the Legislative Council of Hong Kong in 1995, which elects one member of the Legislative Council using the first-past-the-post voting system. The constituency covers Kowloon City District in Kowloon.

The Kowloon West replaced the constituency in 1998 after the handover of Hong Kong a year before.

== Returned members ==
Elected members are as follows:

Election	Member	Party
1995	Lau Chin-shek	Democratic/CTU

== Election results ==
1995 Legislative Council election: Kowloon South
Party	Candidate	Votes	%	±%
Democratic (CTU)	Lau Chin-shek	26,827	69.86	
LDF	Wong Siu-yee	11,572	30.14	
Majority		15,255	39.72	
Total valid votes		38,399	100.00	
Rejected ballots		255		
Turnout		38,654	36.61	
Registered electors		105,597		
Democratic win (new seat)				
