= Revolutionary Communist Party of China =

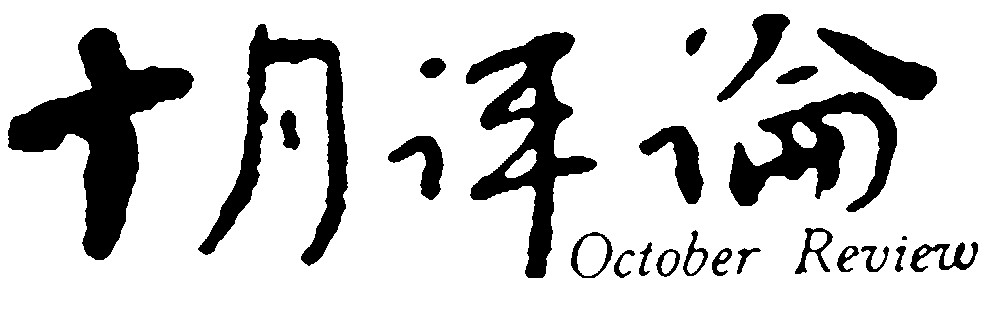
- Founder: Peng Shuzhi
- Founded: September 1948
- Preceded by: Communist League of China
- Newspaper: October Review
- Ideology: Communism; Marxism; Trotskyism; Revolutionary socialism Anti-Stalinism
- Political position: Far-left
- International affiliation: Fourth International
- Regional affiliation: Pro-democracy camp
- Colours: Red

Revolutionary Communist Party of China
- Traditional Chinese: 中國革命共產黨
- Simplified Chinese: 中国革命共产党
Transcriptions
Standard Mandarin
- Hanyu Pinyin: Zhōngguó Gémìng Gòngchǎndǎng
Yue: Cantonese
- Yale Romanization: Jūng gwok gaak mihng guhng cháan dóng
- Jyutping: Zung1 gwok3 gaak3 ming6 gung6 caan2 dong2

The Revolutionary Communist Party of China is a Trotskyist political party based in Hong Kong. The party's members fled from mainland China after the Marxist-Leninist Communist Party of China seized power in 1949, and its activities have since been limited to Hong Kong. Since 1974, the party has been legally active as the October Review, its official publication.

== Performance in elections ==
=== Legislative Council elections ===
Election	Number of popular votes	% of popular votes	GC seats	FC seats	Total seats	+/−	Position
1991	3,431	0.25	0	0	0 / 70	—N/a	—N/a

=== District Council elections ===
Election	Number of popular votes	% of popular votes	Total elected seats	+/−
1985	1,909	0.28	1 / 237	1▲
1988	1,532▼	0.24▼	1 / 264	0
1991	2,382▲	0.56▲	1 / 272	0
1999	1,896 ▼	0.23 ▼	1 / 519	0
2003	1,738 ▼	0.17 ▼	1 / 529	0
2007	1,113 ▼	0.10 ▼	0 / 534	1▼

== See also ==
- Socialism in Hong Kong
- Socialist Action (Hong Kong)
