= Regional Council (constituency) =

Functional constituency in Hong Kong

- Former Functional constituency for the Legislative Council of Hong Kong

Former constituency
- Created: 1986
- Abolished: 2000
- Number of members: One
- Replaced by: Catering; District Council

The Regional Council was an electoral college created in 1986 and became one of the functional constituencies between 1991 and 2000 for the Legislative Council of Hong Kong, until the Urban Council and the Regional Council themselves were abolished in 1999 and the constituencies replaced by District Council and Catering in the 2000 LegCo election. The constituency was composed of all members of the Regional Council.

== Legislative Council members ==
Election	Member	Party
1986 by-election	Lau Wong-fat	Nonpartisan
1988	Cheung Yan-lung	PHKS
1991	Gilbert Leung	Nonpartisan
1993 by-election	Alfred Tso	LDF
1995	Ngan Kam-chuen	DAB
Not represented in the Provisional Legislative Council (1996–98)
1998	Tang Siu-tong	Progressive Alliance
2000	Constituency abolished	

== Election results ==
=== 1990s ===
1998 Regional Council by-election
Party	Candidate	Votes	%	±%
HKPA	Tang Siu-tong	28	56.0	+6.0
Independent	Chiang Lai-wan	22	44.0	−4.0
DAB	Ngan Kam-chuen	0		
HKPA hold		Swing		

1998 Legislative Council election: Regional Council
Party	Candidate	Votes	%	±%
HKPA	Tang Siu-tong	25	51.02	
Independent	Chiang Lai-wan	24	48.98	
DAB	Ngan Kam-chuen	0		−56.76
Majority		1	2.04	
Total valid votes		49	100.00	
Rejected ballots		1		
Turnout		50	100.00	
Registered electors		50		
HKPA win (new seat)				

1995 Legislative Council election: Regional Council
Party	Candidate	Votes	%	±%
DAB	Ngan Kam-chuen	21	56.76	
Democratic	Alan Tam King-wah	16	43.24	
Majority		5	13.52	
Total valid votes		37	100.00	
Rejected ballots		2		
Turnout		39	100.00	
Registered electors		39		
DAB gain from LDF		Swing		

1993 Regional Council by-election
Party	Candidate	Votes	%	±%
LDF	Alfred Tso Shiu-wai	17	51.5	
Independent	Yeung Fuk-kwong	6	18.2	
United Democrats	Chow Yick-hay	5	15.2	−26.5
Independent	Lau Kong-wah	5	15.2	
LDF gain from FSHK		Swing		

1991 Legislative Council election: Regional Council
Party	Candidate	Votes	%	±%
Nonpartisan	Gilbert Leung Kam-ho	20	40.00	
United Democrats	Chow Yick-hay	15	30.00	
FSHK	Daniel Lam Wai-keung	10	20.00	
Independent	Chow Chun-wing	5	10.00	
Majority		5	10.00	
Turnout		36	100.00	
Registered electors		36		
Nonpartisan gain from FSHK		Swing		

=== 1980s ===
1988 Legislative Council election: Regional Council
Party	Candidate	Votes	%	±%
PHKS	Cheung Yan-lung	19	52.8	
Nonpartisan	Tang Kwok-yung	13	36.1	
HKAS	Choy Kan-pui	8	22.2	
PHKS gain from Nonpartisan		Swing		

1986 Regional Council by-election
Party	Candidate	Votes	%	±%
Nonpartisan	Lau Wong-fat	Unopposed		
Nonpartisan win (new seat)				
