= 1991 Hong Kong legislative election =

- 12 & 15 September 1991

39 (of the 60) seats to the Legislative Council 31 seats needed for a majority
- Registered: 1,916,925 (GC)
- Turnout: 750,467 (39.15%)
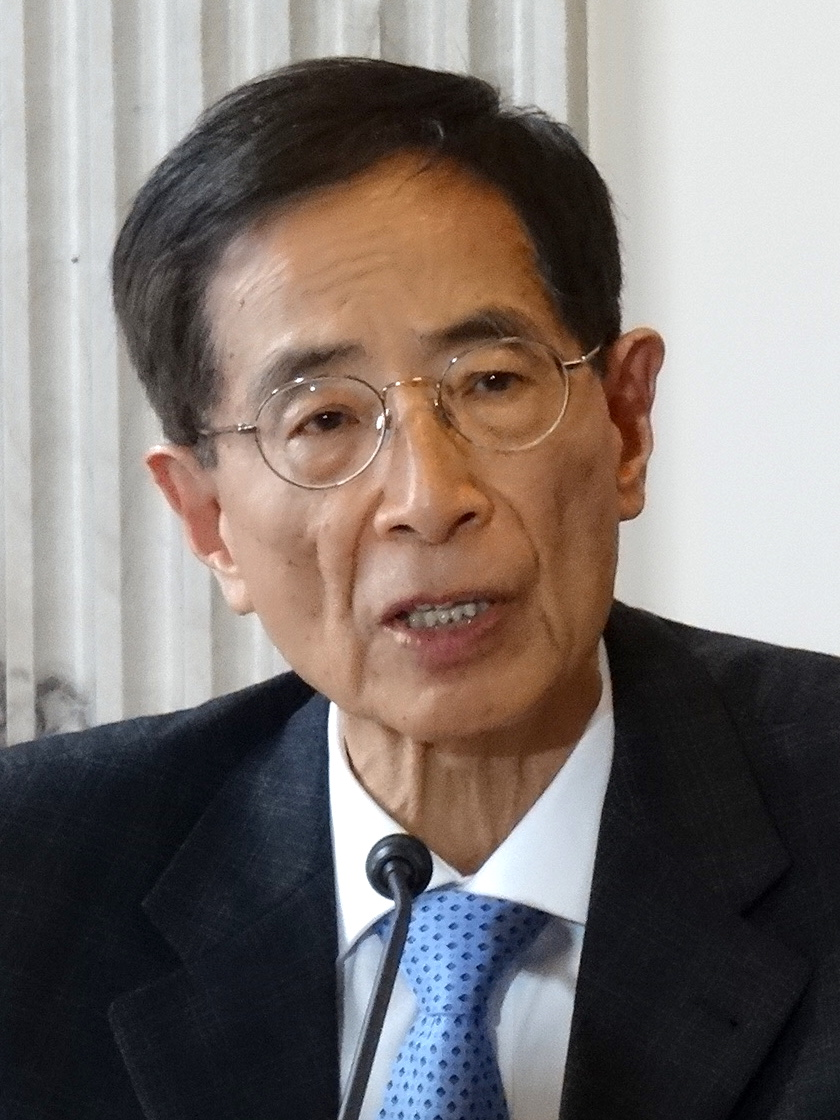

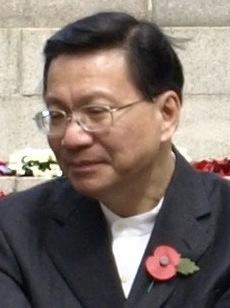

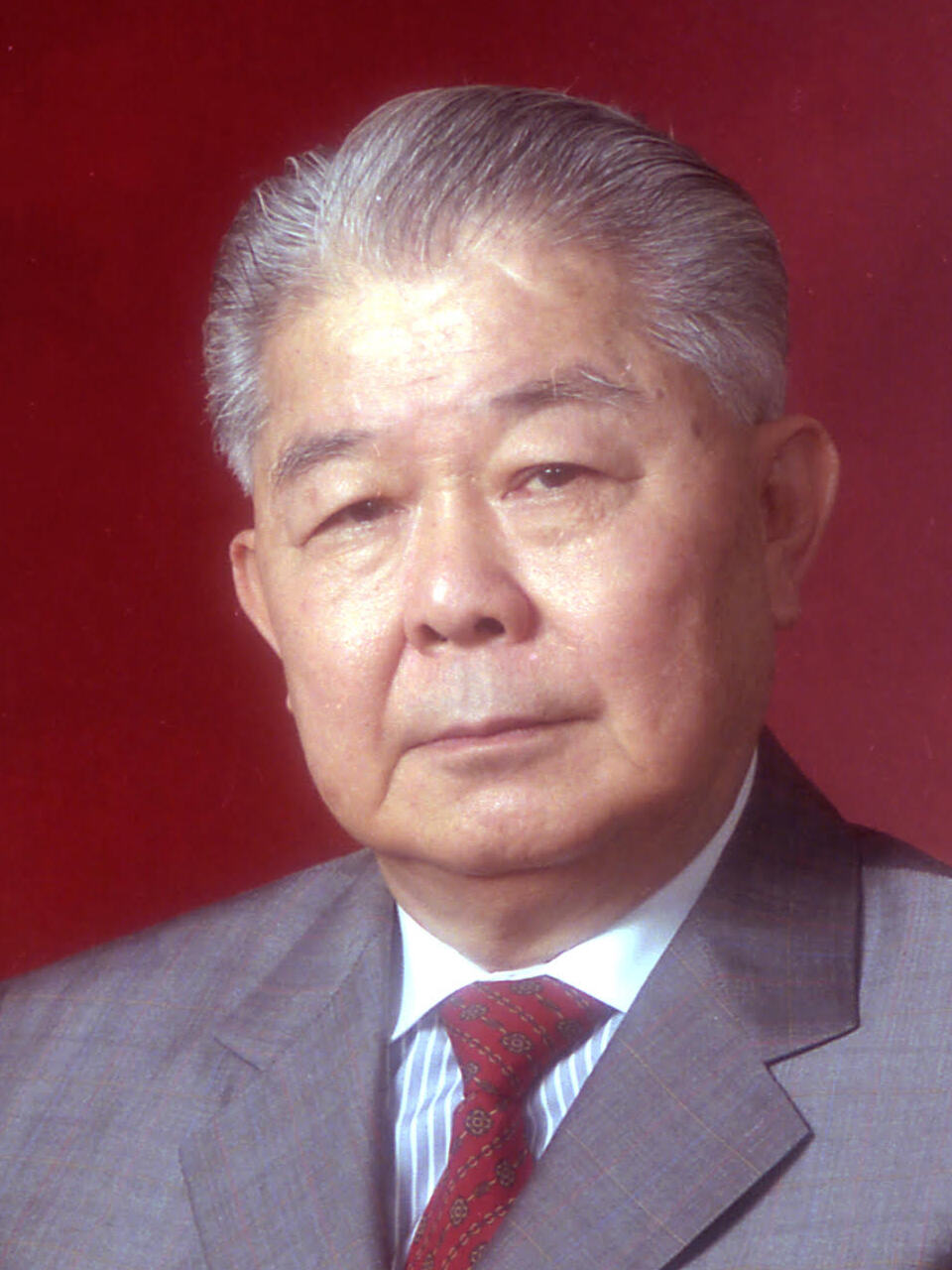

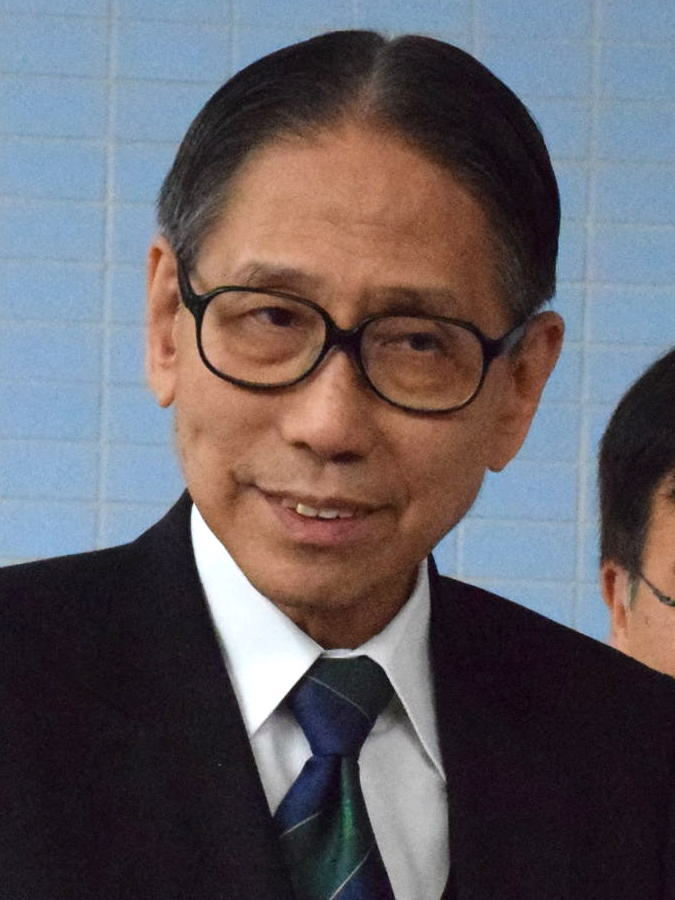

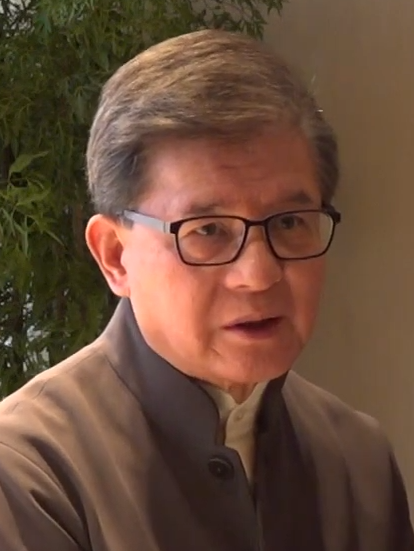

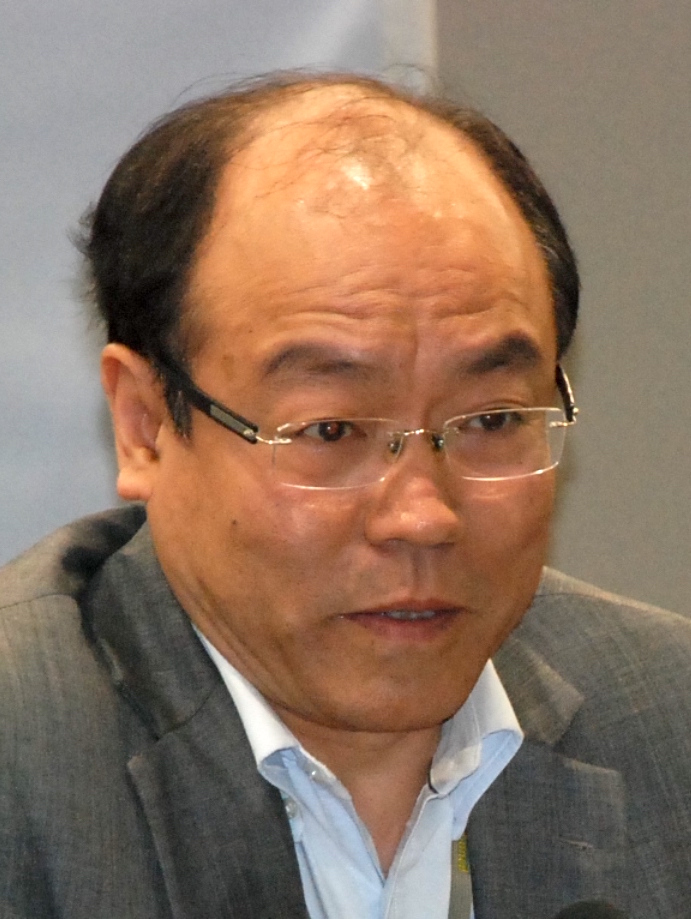
	First party	Second party	Third party
Leader	Martin Lee	Hu Fa-kuang	Anthony Cheung
Party	United Democrats	LDF	Meeting Point
Alliance	Pro-democracy	Conservative	Pro-democracy
Leader's seat	Hong Kong Island East	Appointed (before election)	Did not stand
Seats won	14	3	2
Seat change	▲12	▼3	▲2
Popular vote	618,209	70,697	98,588
Percentage	45.15%	5.16%	7.20%
	Fourth party	Fifth party	Sixth party
Leader	Chan Yat-sen	Leong Che-hung	Vincent Lo
Party	FSHK	HKDF	BPF
Alliance	Conservative	Pro-democracy	Conservative
Leader's seat	Did not stand	Medical	Did not stand
Seats won	2	2	2
Seat change	▼2	▼1	▲1
Popular vote	30,871	19,806	N/A
Percentage	2.25%	1.45%	N/A
	Seventh party	Eighth party	Ninth party
Leader	Frederick Fung	Lee Chark-tim	Lo Tak-shing
Party	ADPL	FTU	NHKA
Alliance	Pro-democracy	Pro-Beijing	Pro-Beijing
Leader's seat	Kowloon West	Did not stand	Did not stand
Seats won	1	1	1
Seat change	Steady	Steady	▲1
Popular vote	60,770	44,894	11,934
Percentage	4.44%	3.28%	0.87%
- Elected candidates by each constituency

The 1991 Hong Kong Legislative Council election was held for members of the Legislative Council of Hong Kong (LegCo). The election of the members of functional constituencies was held on 12 September 1991 and the election of geographical constituency seats was held on 15 September respectively. It was the first ever direct election of the Legislative Council in Hong Kong history. There were 18 members from directly elected geographical constituencies, 21 members from functional constituencies, 17 members appointed by the Governor, and 3 official members.

A coalition of the United Democrats and the Meeting Point, together with other smaller parties, groups and independents in the pro-democracy camp had a landslide victory, getting 16 of the 18 geographical constituency seats. Two-seat constituency two vote system was used with two seats to be filled in each constituency. The voting system helped the pro-democracy coalition win with landslide success and faced criticisms. In the end, the government prescribed simple plurality in the next election.

== Background ==
After the Sino-British Joint Declaration signed in December 1984 stated the sovereignty of Hong Kong would be transferred from the United Kingdom to the People's Republic of China, the pace of the democratisation towards a government of high autonomy towards 1997 became a major political debate. The Hong Kong government denied the demand of the pro-democracy groups of introducing direct elections in the 1988 Legislative Council elections, due to the main opposition from Beijing and the conservative business and professional elites. As a result, the electoral methods of the functional constituencies being elected by different business and professional sectors and the Electoral Colleges being elected by the District Boards and the two municipal councils (Urban Council and Regional Council) remained in the 1988 elections but it was promised by the government that direct elections would be introduced in the 1991 elections.

== Overview ==
The Hong Kong government's assumed the two-seat constituencies would produce a mixture of liberal, rural conservative and business representatives as well as some members of the "United Front" organisations which supported by Beijing, as the voters would cast their ballots for prominent individuals rather than a "party" label. However, the two-seat and two-vote system benefited the pro-democracy coalition in the end.

The election was largely affected by the events in May and June 1989 in China when the Tiananmen Square protest was bloodily cracked down by the Beijing government. The events sparked the great fear among the Hong Kong population who closely concerned or enthusiastically supported the student movement. The pro-democracy groups supported the student protests by forming the Hong Kong Alliance in Support of Patriotic Democratic Movements in China in May 1989. After the crackdown, the liberal leaders, Martin Lee and Szeto Wah had been labelled as "subversives" by the Beijing government and expelled form the Hong Kong Basic Law Drafting Committee. In 1990, members of the three major pro-democracy groups, the Meeting Point, the Hong Kong Affairs Society and the Association for Democracy and People's Livelihood came together under the banner of the United Democrats of Hong Kong, which self-proclaimed as the first political party in Hong Kong.

The pro-democracy liberals won a landslide in the geographical constituency direct elections. The United Democrats led by Martin Lee became the largest party, by winning 12 of the 18 seats in the geographical constituencies. Two other seats went to its ally Meeting Point headed by Anthony Cheung. Frederick Fung, Chairman of the ADPL won a seat in Kowloon West. Of the remaining seats, one went to a liberal independent Emily Lau, one to an independent incumbent Andrew Wong and the other to an incumbent rural conservative Tai Chin-wah.

The conservative Liberal Democratic Federation of Hong Kong, newly founded in 1990 mainly by business and professional groups favouring collaboration with Beijing, polled only 5.1% of the vote. None of its candidates were elected in the direct elections. The pro-Beijing "united front" organisations received only 7.9% of the vote and were also very easily defeated. Chan Yuen-han, the Hong Kong Federation of Trade Unions (FTU) candidate in Kowloon Central polled about 11,000 votes fewer than the second place United Democrat, Dr. Conrad Lam and was about 23,000 votes behind the winner, United Democrat Lau Chin-shek. In Island East, Cheng Kai-nam who had the support of a pro-Beijing group, Hong Kong Citizen Forum, polled 29,902 against the United Democrats' leader Martin Lee, who received 76,831 votes.

The advantage of the liberals was balanced with the functional constituency indirectly elected by the limited electorates of the business and professional sectors as well as the appointed members by the government. the Chief Secretary Sir David Ford said on television that the elections should be seen in the context of a 50% registration rate, of whom perhaps only 50% might turn out at the polls therefore the majority who were not represented would be reserved by appointing members who might be thought to represent those who had not registered or had not voted.

== General results ==
Overall Summary of the 12 & 15 September 1991 Legislative Council of Hong Kong election results
Political affiliation	Geographical constituencies				Functional constituencies				Total seats
Political affiliation	Votes	%	Candidates	Seats	Votes	%	Candidates	Seats	Total seats
United Democrats of Hong Kong	618,209	45.15	14	12	15,208	66.46	3	2	14
Meeting Point	98,588	7.20	3	2	−	−	−	−	2
Hong Kong Democratic Foundation	19,806	1.45	1	0	487	2.13	2	2	2
Hong Kong Association for Democracy and People's Livelihood	60,770	4.44	3	1	−	−	−	−	1
Independents and others	46,515	3.40	1	1	−	−	−	−	1
Total for Liberals	843,888	61.63	22	16	15,695	68.59	5	4	20
Liberal Democratic Federation of Hong Kong	69,832	5.10	5	0	1,118	4.89	5	3	3
Business and Professionals Federation of Hong Kong	−	−	−	−	968	4.23	3	2	2
Federation for the Stability of Hong Kong	30,871	2.25	1	1	10	0.04	2	1	2
Total for Conservatives	100,703	7.35	6	1	2,096	9.16	10	6	7
Hong Kong Federation of Trade Unions	44,894	3.28	1	0	–	–	1	1	1
New Hong Kong Alliance	11,934	0.87	2	0	136	0.59	2	1	1
Hong Kong Citizen Forum	29,902	2.18	1	0	−	−	−	−	0
Kwun Tong Man Chung Friendship Promotion Association	21,225	1.55	1	0	−	−	−	−	0
Total for pro-Beijing	107,955	7.88	5	0	136	0.59	3	2	2
Hong Kong and Kowloon Trades Union Council	3,393	0.25	1	0	−	−	1	1	1
Hong Kong Civic Association	14,145	1.03	1	0	−	−	−	−	0
Reform Club of Hong Kong	8,257	0.60	1	0	−	−	−	−	0
October Review	3,431	0.25	1	0	−	−	−	−	0
Independents and others	287,561	21.00	17	1	4,957	21.66	21	8	9
Total (turnout 39.15%)	1,369,333	100.00	54	18	22,884	100.00	40	21	39

Note: There were also 18 members appointed by the Governor and 3 Ex-Officio members.

=== Votes summary ===
Popular vote
UD	45.15%
Meeting Point	7.20%
LDF	5.16%
ADPL	4.44%
FTU	3.28%
FSHK	2.25%
PHKS	2.20%
CF	2.18%
KCMCFPA	1.55%
DF	1.45%
Civic	1.03%
NHKA	0.87%
Reform	0.60%
TUC	0.25%
OR	0.25%
Independent	24.40%

=== Seats summary ===
Seats
UD	35.90%
LDF	7.69%
Meeting Point	5.13%
FSHK	5.13%
DF	5.13%
BPF	5.13%
ADPL	2.64%
FTU	2.64%
NHKA	2.64%
TUC	2.64%
Independent	20.51%

== Result breakdown ==
=== Geographical Constituencies ===
Constituency	Candidates	Affiliation	Votes	%
Hong Kong Island East	Martin Lee Chu-ming	United Democrats	76,831	74.6
Hong Kong Island East	Man Sai-cheong	United Democrats	43,615	42.3
Hong Kong Island East	Cheng Kai-nam	Citizen Forum	29,902	29.0
Hong Kong Island East	Chan Ying-lun	HKDF	19,806	19.2
Hong Kong Island East	Diana Leung Wai-tung	Independent	15,230	14.8
Hong Kong Island East	Jennifer Chow Kit-bing	Independent	5,805	5.6
Hong Kong Island West	Yeung Sum	United Democrats	45,108	65.4
Hong Kong Island West	Huang Chen-ya	United Democrats	31,052	45.0
Hong Kong Island West	David Chan Yuk-cheung	Independent	29,413	42.6
Hong Kong Island West	Alexander Chang Yau-hung	LDF	12,145	17.6
Hong Kong Island West	Ronnie Wong Man-chiu	NHKA	6,113	8.9
Hong Kong Island West	Winnie Cheung Wai-sun	NHKA	5,821	8.4
Kowloon East	Szeto Wah	United Democrats	57,921	70.3
Kowloon East	Li Wah-ming	Meeting Point	49,643	60.2
Kowloon East	Hau Shui-pui	KTMCA	21,225	25.8
Kowloon East	Poon Chi-fai	Independent	16,625	20.2
Kowloon East	Chan Cheong	October Review	3,431	4.2
Kowloon East	Li Ting-kit	TUC	3,393	4.1
Kowloon East	Philip Li Koi-hop	Nonpartisan (LDF)	865	1.0
Kowloon Central	Lau Chin-shek	United Democrats	68,489	62.2
Kowloon Central	Conrad Lam Kui-shing	United Democrats	56,084	51.0
Kowloon Central	Chan Yuen-han	FTU	44,894	40.8
Kowloon Central	Peter Chan Chi-kwan	Civic	14,145	12.9
Kowloon Central	Cecilia Yeung Lai-yin	Reform	8,257	7.5
Kowloon Central	John Dragon Young	Independent (HKAS/UDHK)	6,273	5.7
Kowloon Central	Justin Cheung Chung-ming	Independent	2,158	2.0
Kowloon West	Frederick Fung Kin-kee	ADPL	36,508	52.5
Kowloon West	James To Kun-sun	United Democrats	26,352	37.9
Kowloon West	Desmond Lee Yu-tai	Independent (HKCA/UDHK)	21,471	30.9
Kowloon West	Kingsley Sit Ho-yin	Independent	18,634	26.8
Kowloon West	Law Cheung-kwok	ADPL	17,145	24.7
Kowloon West	Ng Kin-sun	LDF	6,098	8.8
New Territories East	Emily Lau Wai-hing	Independent	46,515	48.1
New Territories East	Andrew Wong Wang-fat	Independent	39,806	41.2
New Territories East	Tony Kan Chung-nin	Independent	37,126	38.4
New Territories East	Lau Kong-wah	United Democrats	26,659	27.6
New Territories East	Johnston Wong Hong-chung	United Democrats	26,156	27.1
New Territories East	Choi Man-hing	Independent	348	0.4
New Territories East	Eric Leung Ka-ching	Independent	306	0.3
New Territories South	Lee Wing-tat	United Democrats	52,192	56.9
New Territories South	Albert Chan Wai-yip	United Democrats	42,164	45.9
New Territories South	Leung Yiu-chung	Independent (NWSC)	38,568	42.0
New Territories South	Yeung Fuk-kwong	Independent (PHKS)	30,095	32.8
New Territories West	Ng Ming-yum	United Democrats	42,319	51.9
New Territories West	Tai Chin-wah	FSHK	30,871	37.9
New Territories West	Zachary Wong Wai-yin	Meeting Point	27,243	33.4
New Territories West	Tang Siu-tong	Independent	23,389	28.7
New Territories West	Tso Shiu-wai	LDF	20,018	24.6
New Territories North	Fung Chi-wood	United Democrats	23,267	49.9
New Territories North	Tik Chi-yuen	Meeting Point	21,702	46.5
New Territories North	Cheung Hon-chung	LDF	16,221	34.8
New Territories North	Johnny Wong Chi-keung	LDF	15,350	32.9
New Territories North	Ronald Chow Mei-tak	ADPL	7,117	15.3
New Territories North	Tong Wai-man	Independent	1,449	3.1

=== Functional Constituencies ===
Constituency	Candidates	Affiliation	Votes	%
First Commercial	James David McGregor	HKDF	487	53.9
First Commercial	Paul Cheng Ming-fun	BPF	416	46.1
Second Commercial	Philip Wong Yu-hong	NHKA	Uncontested	
First Industrial	Stephen Cheong Kam-chuen	BPF	Uncontested	
Second Industrial	Ngai Shiu-kit	LDF	216	56.5
Second Industrial	Szeto Fai	Independent	166	43.5
Engineering	Samuel Wong Ping-wai	Independent	1,334	89.8
Engineering	Hogan Tang Ka-fat	Independent	151	10.2
Architectural, Surveying and Planning	Edward Ho Sing-tin	BPF	552	53.7
Architectural, Surveying and Planning	Francis Lau Shiu-kwan	LDF	246	23.9
Architectural, Surveying and Planning	Kan Fook-yee	NHKA	136	13.2
Architectural, Surveying and Planning	Charles Nicholas Brooke	Independent	94	9.1
Real Estate and Construction	Ronald Joseph Arculli	Independent	Uncontested	
Teaching	Cheung Man-kwong	United Democrats	15,193	89.8
Teaching	Ho King-on	Independent	886	5.2
Teaching	Walter Wou Tchong-hong	Independent	836	4.9
Tourism	Howard Young	LDF	338	40.7
Tourism	Harold Wu Tan	LDF	318	38.3
Tourism	Ronnie Yuen Ka-chai	Independent	175	21.1
Accountancy	Peter Wong Hong-yuen	LDF	Uncontested	
Legal	Simon Ip Sik-on	Independent	542	77.4
Legal	John William Miller	Independent	158	22.6
Social Services	Hui Yin-fat	Independent	Uncontested	
Health Care	Michael Ho Mun-ka	United Democrats	Uncontested	
Medical	Leong Che-hung	HKDF	Uncontested	
Finance	David Li Kwok-po	Independent	Uncontested	
Financial Services	Chim Pui-chung	Independent	281	47.6
Financial Services	Alex Wong Po-hang	Independent	200	33.9
Financial Services	Cham Yau-tong	Independent	59	10.0
Financial Services	Peter Chan Po-fun	Independent	36	6.1
Financial Services	Chum Ting-pong	Independent	9	1.5
Financial Services	Wong Wun-wing	Independent	5	0.8
Labour (2 seats)	Pang Chun-hoi	TUC	Uncontested	
Labour (2 seats)	Tam Yiu-chung	FTU	Uncontested	
Urban Council	Elsie Tu	Independent	Uncontested	
Regional Council	Gilbert Leung Kam-ho	Independent	20	40.0
Regional Council	Chow Yick-hay	United Democrats	15	30.0
Regional Council	Lam Wai-keung	FSHK	10	20.0
Regional Council	Chau Chun-wing	Independent	5	10.0
Rural	Lau Wong-fat	FSHK	Uncontested	

== Bibliography ==
- An Overview of the Hong Kong Legislative Council Elections of 1991 The Asian Journal of Public Administration Vol. 13 No. 2 (1991 Dec).
