= Kowloon Tong (constituency) =

Constituency of the Kowloon City District Council of Hong Kong

- Elected constituency for the Kowloon City District Council
- Boundary of Kowloon Tong in Kowloon City District
- District: Kowloon City
- Legislative Council constituency: Kowloon Central
- Population: 20,309 (2019)
- Electorate: 7,947 (2019)

Current constituency
- Created: 1991
- Number of members: One
- Member: Ho Hin-ming (Liberal)
- Created from: Kowloon Tong & Ma Tau Wai

Kowloon Tong is one of the 25 constituencies in the Kowloon City District in Hong Kong.

The constituency returns one district councillor to the Kowloon City District Council, with an election every four years. The seat has been currently held by Ho Hin-ming of the Liberal Party.

Kowloon Tong constituency is loosely based on Kowloon Tong area with an estimated population of 20,309.

== Councillors represented ==
| Election | Member | Party |
|---|---|---|
| 1991 | Yung Ching-tat | Independent |
| 1994 | Steven Poon Kwok-lim | Liberal |
| 1999 | Ho Hin-ming | Liberal |

== Election results ==
=== 2010s ===
Kowloon City District Council Election, 2019: Kowloon Tong
| Party | Candidate | Votes | % | ±% |
|---|---|---|---|---|
| Liberal | Ho Hin-ming | 2,952 | 53.49 | |
| Civic | Matthew Wan Chung-yin | 2,567 | 46.51 | |
| Majority | | 385 | 6.98 | |
| Turnout | | 5,537 | 69.68 | |
| Liberal hold | | Swing | | |

Kowloon City District Council Election, 2015: Kowloon Tong
| Party | Candidate | Votes | % | ±% |
|---|---|---|---|---|
| Liberal | Ho Hin-ming | Uncontested | | |
| Liberal hold | | Swing | | |

Kowloon City District Council Election, 2011: Kowloon Tong
| Party | Candidate | Votes | % | ±% |
|---|---|---|---|---|
| Liberal | Ho Hin-ming | Uncontested | | |
| Liberal hold | | Swing | | |

=== 2000s ===
Kowloon City District Council Election, 2007: Kowloon Tong
| Party | Candidate | Votes | % | ±% |
|---|---|---|---|---|
| Liberal | Ho Hin-ming | 1,339 | 59.9 | −13.0 |
| Independent | Felix Cheung Kwok-bui | 539 | 24.1 | |
| ADPL | Tong Yau-tin | 357 | 16.0 | |
| Liberal hold | | Swing | | |

Kowloon City District Council Election, 2003: Kowloon Tong
| Party | Candidate | Votes | % | ±% |
|---|---|---|---|---|
| Liberal | Ho Hin-ming | 1,397 | 72.9 | +8.0 |
| Youth Forum | Felix Cheung Kwok-bui | 520 | 27.1 | |
| Liberal hold | | Swing | | |

=== 1990s ===
Kowloon City District Council Election, 1999: Kowloon Tong
| Party | Candidate | Votes | % | ±% |
|---|---|---|---|---|
| Liberal | Ho Hin-ming | 993 | 64.9 | +14.8 |
| HKPA | Chantal Lau Mei-chun | 511 | 33.4 | |
| Liberal hold | | Swing | | |

Kowloon City District Board Election, 1994: Kowloon Tong
| Party | Candidate | Votes | % | ±% |
|---|---|---|---|---|
| Liberal | Steven Poon Kwok-lim | 724 | 38.3 | |
| Independent | Cheung Man-ping | 576 | 30.5 | |
| Kowloon City Observers | Ho Hin-ming | 568 | 30.1 | |
| Liberal hold | | Swing | | |

Kowloon City District Board Election, 1991: Kowloon Tong
| Party | Candidate | Votes | % | ±% |
|---|---|---|---|---|
| Independent | Yung Tat-ching | Uncontested | | |
| Independent win (new seat) | | | | |
