= Kowloon Central (1991 constituency) =

Historical Constituency in Hong Kong

- Former Geographical constituency for the Legislative Council of Hong Kong
- Boundary of Kowloon Central in Hong Kong
- District: Kowloon City District; Wong Tai Sin District
- Region: Kowloon
- Electorate: 287,373

Former constituency
- Created: 1991
- Abolished: 1995
- Number of members: Two
- Replaced by: Kowloon Central (1995); Kowloon North-east; Kowloon South

Kowloon Central was a geographical constituencies in the election for the Legislative Council of Hong Kong in 1991, which elects two members of the Legislative Council using the dual-seat constituency dual vote system. The constituency covers Kowloon City District and Wong Tai Sin District in Kowloon.

A by-election was held on 5 March 1995 after Lau Chin-shek resigned from his office to protest against government's withdrawal of Employment Bill.

The constituency was divided and replaced by the Kowloon Central, Kowloon North-east, and Kowloon South constituencies in 1995.

== Returned members ==
Elected members are as follows:

Election	Member	Party	Member	Party
1991	Lau Chin-shek	UDHK	Conrad Lam	UDHK
1994	Lau Chin-shek	Democratic	Conrad Lam	Democratic
1995 (b)	Lee Cheuk-yan	CTU	Conrad Lam	Democratic

== Election results ==
1995 Kowloon Central by-election
Party	Candidate	Votes	%	±%
CTU	Lee Cheuk-yan	Unopposed		
CTU gain from Democratic		Swing		

1991 Legislative Council election: Kowloon Central
Party	Candidate	Votes	%	±%
United Democrats	Lau Chin-shek	68,489	34.19	
United Democrats	Conrad Lam Kui-shing	56,084	28.00	
FTU	Chan Yuen-han	44,894	22.41	
Civic	Peter Chan Chi-kwan	14,145	7.06	
Reform	Cecilia Yeung Lai-yin	8,257	4.12	
Independent	John Dragon Young	6,273	3.13	
Independent	Justin Cheung Chung-ming	2,158	1.08	
Turnout		110,043	38.29	
Registered electors		287,373		
United Democrats win (new seat)				
United Democrats win (new seat)				
