= Ngan Kam-chuen =

Ngan Kam-chuen 顏錦全

Member of the Provisional Legislative Council
- In office 21 December 1996 – 30 June 1998

Member of the Legislative Council
- In office 11 October 1995 – 30 June 1997
- Preceded by: Alfred Tso
- Constituency: Regional Council

Personal details
- Born: 12 December 1947 Hong Kong
- Died: 19 December 2014 (aged 67)
- Party: DAB
- Children: 2
- Occupation: Bank Senior Manager

Ngan Kam-chuen (12 December 1947 – 19 December 2014) was the member of the Legislative Council in 1995–97 for Regional Council. He joined the Provisional Legislative Council existed from 1996 to 98. He was also the Regional Council member from 1989 to 2000.

Legislative Council of Hong Kong
New parliament	Member of Provisional Legislative Council; 1997–1998	Replaced by Legislative Council
