= Martin Gilbert Barrow =

Hong Kong businessman, entrepreneur and politician

Member of the Legislative Council
- In office 12 October 1988 – 31 July 1995
- Appointed by: David Wilson

Personal details
- Born: 10 March 1944 (age 82) Lancashire, England
- Spouse: Noriko Barrow
- Children: 2
- Education: Harrow School
- Occupation: Company Director

Martin Gilbert Barrow, GBS, CBE (born 10 March 1944) was an appointed unofficial member of the Legislative Council of Hong Kong (1988–95) and a Company Director of Jardine Matheson. He is notable for being the last Chairman of Jardines' Japan business before the Company exited all its Japanese business interests.

He was also the chairman of the Hong Kong Tourist Association and vice-chairman of the Hong Kong General Chamber of Commerce.

Political offices
Preceded by Michael Miles	Chairman of the Hong Kong Tourist Association; 1988–1996	Succeeded by Lo Yuk-sui
