= Gilbert Leung =

Gilbert Leung Kam-ho 梁錦濠

Member of the Legislative Council
- In office 9 October 1991 – 31 May 1993
- Preceded by: Cheung Yan-lung
- Succeeded by: Tso Shiu-wai
- Constituency: Regional Council

Personal details
- Born: 23 July 1953 (age 73) Macau
- Party: Federation for the Stability of Hong Kong; Co-operative Resources Centre
- Spouse: Cheung Poh-suan
- Children: 1
- Education: Chinese University of Hong Kong; Willesden College of Technology
- Occupation: Chartered surveyor

Glibert Leung Kam-ho (born 23 July 1953, Macau) was a member of the Legislative Council of Hong Kong (1991–93) for the Regional Council constituency, Regional Council of Hong Kong and Sai Kung District Board.

He was found guilty in 1993 for trying to bribe two regional councillors to vote for him in the 1991 Legislative Council election and removed from the seat. He was subsequently jailed for three years.
