= Roger Luk =

Hong Kong politician

Roger Luk Koon-ho BBS, JP
- 陸觀豪

Member of the Legislative Council
- In office 8 October 1992 – 31 July 1995
- Appointed by: Chris Patten

Personal details
- Born: 10 August 1951 (age 75) Hong Kong
- Education: University of Hong Kong; Chinese University of Hong Kong
- Occupation: Assistant general manager

Roger Luk Koon-ho, BBS, JP (born 10 August 1951, Hong Kong) was a member of the Legislative Council of Hong Kong (1992–95) and the assistant general manager of the Hang Seng Bank.
