= Ngai Shiu-kit =

Hong Kong politician

Ngai Shiu-kit OBE, SBS, JP
- 倪少傑

Member of the Provisional Legislative Council
- In office 21 December 1996 – 30 June 1998

Member of the Legislative Council
- In office 30 October 1985 – 30 June 1997
- Constituency: Industrial (Second)

Personal details
- Born: 14 November 1924 Hong Kong
- Died: 9 April 2015 (aged 90) Hong Kong
- Party: New Hong Kong Alliance (1989–90); Liberal Democratic Federation of Hong Kong (1990–93); Liberal Party (since 1993)
- Spouse: Chan Chor-wan
- Children: 6
- Education: Wah Yan College; Lingnan University
- Occupation: Businessman

Ngai Shiu-kit, OBE, SBS, JP (Chinese: 倪少傑; 14 November 1924 – 2015) was a Hong Kong entrepreneur and a former member of the Legislative Council of Hong Kong (1985–97) for the Industrial (Second) constituency, representing the Chinese Manufacturers' Association of Hong Kong and Provisional Legislative Council. He was also a Hong Kong delegate for the 9th National People's Congress from 1998 to 2003.

== Biography ==
Ngai was born in Hong kong on 14 November 1924. He graduated from the Wah Yan College, Hong Kong and the Lingnan University in Canton in engineering management in 1948 and studied abroad in England. He worked at his cousin's weaving factory after returning to Hong Kong and became the chairman of the Yat Fung Developments Company. He was also member of the Chinese Manufacturers' Association of Hong Kong and led the negotiation with the British Customs. From 1978 to 1985 he was the president of the association and later became its permanent honorary president. During his presidency, he supervised the reconstruction of the C.M.A. Building in Connaught Road Central, Central, Hong Kong.

Ngai was first made justice of the peace in 1980 and was awarded Officer of the Order of the British Empire (OBE) in 1985. When in 1985 the first indirect elections to the Legislative Council of Hong Kong were introduced, Ngai was nominated by the Chinese Manufacturers' Association to be the representative in the Second Industrial functional constituency. He had also served on the Hong Kong Trade Development Council and the Vocational Training Council.

In 1990, he became member of the pro-business conservative political party Liberal Democratic Federation of Hong Kong (LDF). In 1991 he was re-elected to the Legislative Council for the third term, defeating Szeto Fai. He joined the Co-operative Resources Centre (CRC) led by the Senior Unofficial Member Allen Lee to counter the liberal influence of the United Democrats of Hong Kong who won a landslide victory in the 1991 election. He left the LDF in 1993 to join the Liberal Party when the CRC transformed into political party.

On the eve of the handover of Hong Kong, Ngai was appointed Hong Kong Affairs Adviser, member of the Preliminary Working Committee and the Preparatory Committee for the HKSAR. On the basis of the Preparatory Committee, he was selected to the Selection Committee, which was responsible for the first SAR Chief Executive election and the Provisional Legislative Council, in which he was elected to the provisional legislature existed from 1997 to 1998. In 1997, he was also elected to the 9th National People's Congress as a Hong Kong delegate.

In the first SAR Legislative Council election in 1998, Ngai was defeated by Lui Ming-wah in his own Industrial (Second) constituency. In 2001, he was awarded Silver Bauhinia Star (SBS) for his public service. He also lost in the National People's Congress re-election in 2002 which marked the end of his political career.

He died in 2015.

Legislative Council of Hong Kong
New constituency	Member of Legislative Council; Representative for Industrial (Second); 1985–1997	Replaced by Provisional Legislative Council
New parliament	Member of Provisional Legislative Council; 1997–1998	Replaced by Legislative Council
