= Felice Lieh-Mak =

Hong Kong physician and psychiatrist (born 1941)

Prof The Honourable Felice Lieh–Mak CBE, GBS, JP
- 麥列菲菲

Member of the Legislative Council
- In office 9 October 1991 – 7 October 1992
- Appointed by: David Wilson

Personal details
- Born: 10 August 1941 (age 85) Philippines
- Spouse: Gregory Mak Wei-kei
- Children: 3
- Education: University of Santo Tomas
- Occupation: Professor of psychiatry

Felice Lieh–Mak CBE JP FRCP FRANZCP (Chinese: 麥列菲菲; Jyutping: Mak^{6} Lit^{6} Fei^{1}-fei^{1}; born 10 August 1941) is a Hong Kong physician, psychiatrist, academician, editor and retired civil servant, and emeritus professor at the University of Hong Kong.

== Background ==
She graduated from the University of Santo Tomas in the Philippines and undertook specialty training in London, joining the University of Hong Kong (HKU) in 1978. She was a member of Hong Kong's Legislative and Executive Councils, served as chairwoman of the Medical Council and of the English Schools Foundation (until her resignation from the latter in March 2011 for personal reasons, including the arrival of her first grandchild), as president of the World Psychiatric Association, and as an advisor to the United Nations and the World Health Organization.

== Education ==
- University of Santo Tomas, MD (cum laude), 1964, Medicine, Philippines
- Licentiate of Apothecaries LAH, 1967 Medicine Hall, Dublin, Ireland

== Notable appointments ==
- 1966–67: Senior House Officer (Psychiatry), Littlemore Hospital, University of Oxford, Oxford, UK
- 1968–69: Medical Officer in Psychiatry, Castle Peak Hospital, Hong Kong
- 1970–70: Senior House Officer, Littlemore Hospital, Oxford University
- 1971–78: Lecturer, Department of Psychiatry, University of Hong Kong (HKU)
- 1974–74: Honorary Registrar, Park Hospital for Children, Oxford University
- 1974–74: Honorary Registrar, Warneford Hospital, Oxford University
- 1978–81: Senior Lecturer, Department of Psychiatry, University of Hong Kong (HKU)
- 1981–83: Reader, Department of Psychiatry, University of Hong Kong (HKU)
- 1990–94: President, Hong Kong College of Psychiatrists
- 1992–97: Member, Executive Council, Governor's Cabinet, Hong Kong
- 1993–98: Chairman, Kowloon Regional Advisory Committee of the Hospital Authority
- 1993–96: President, World Psychiatric Association
- 1994–96: Chief Examiner, Hong Kong College of Psychiatrists
- 1994–97: Chairman, Kwai Chung Hospital Governing Committee
- 1996–99: Chairman, Education Foundation, World Psychiatric Association

== Notable affiliations ==
- 1979–present: Consultant, University Health Service, University of Hong Kong (HKU)
- 1980–present: Consultant (Psychiatry), Hong Kong Government
- 1983–present: Professor and Head, Department of Psychiatry, University of Hong Kong (HKU)
- 1983–present: Honorary Advisor, Hong Kong Mental Health Association
- 1987–present: Member, Editorial Board, Journal of the Hong Kong Medical Association
- 1991–present: Member, International Editorial Board, Journal of Stress and Depression
- 1994–present: Corresponding Editor, British Journal of Psychiatry
- 1994–present: Consultant, World Health Organization (WHO)
- 1994–present: Member, Editorial Board of the Hong Kong Medical Association
- 1996–present: Member, Editorial Board, Current Opinion in Psychiatry
- 1997–1999: Chairman, Hong Kong Medical Council
- 1997–present: Member, Editorial Advisory Board, Journal of Mental Health Policy and Economics
- 1998–present: Chairman, Task Force on Review of Psychiatric Services
- 1998–present: Member, Steering Committee on Healthcare Financing of the Hong Kong Government
- 1998–2001: President, Asian Union Against Depression and Related Disorders
- 1999–present: Chairman of Queen Mary Hospital's Planning Committee
- 1999–present: Member, Working Group on Quality Assurance, Medical Council of Hong Kong
- 1999–present: Member, Global Forum for Health Research of the WHO/World Bank Mental Health Reform Initiative

== Notable honours/fellowships ==
- August 1981: Fellow of the World Association for Social Psychiatry
- October 1983: Fellow of the Royal Australian and New Zealand College of Psychiatrists
- December 1985: Fellow of the Royal College of Psychiatrists (United Kingdom)
- August 1989: Outstanding Woman Physician (Philippines)
- April 1990: Corresponding Fellow of the American Psychiatric Association
- March 1991: Corresponding Fellow of the German Association for Psychiatry & Neurology
- October 1991: Honorary Member of the Italian Society of Psychiatry
- January 1992: Honorary Member of the Egyptian Psychiatric Association
- June 1994: Honorary Fellowship of the Royal College of Psychiatrists (UK)
- May 1995: Asian-American Award of The American Psychiatric Association
- October 1995: Fellow of the New York Academy of Science
- August 1996: Honorary Fellow of the World Psychiatry Association
- June 1997: Commander of the Most Excellent Order of the British Empire (CBE)

== Notable patients ==
=== Leslie Cheung ===
Felice Lieh-Mak was the psychiatrist of Leslie Cheung, one of the most famous pop music icons in Asia. Leslie Cheung suffered from severe depression and sought treatment from Professor Lieh-Mak for almost a year. Despite her treatment effort Leslie Cheung finally killed himself by leaping off from the 24th floor of the Mandarin Oriental hotel, located in the Central district of Hong Kong Island, citing depression as the cause. As one of the most popular performers in Asia, Cheung's death broke the hearts of millions of his fans across Asia and shocked the Asian entertainment industry and Chinese community worldwide.

Cheung's suicide note (translation):

"Depression! Many thanks to all my friends. Many thanks to Professor Felice Lieh-Mak (麥列菲菲). This year has been so tough. I can't stand it anymore. Many thanks to Mr. Tong. Many thanks to my family. Many thanks to Sister Fei (沈殿霞). In my life I have done nothing bad. Why does it have to be like this?"

Despite the high profile of the patient, no comment has been given by Lieh-Mak on this incident.

== Controversies ==
Felice Lieh-Mak was involved in a case of failure to take proper steps to ensure complete removal of medical equipment which allegedly resulted in suicide of one of her patients after suffering from years of unbearable pain. The incident involved leaving behind a 2 mm long broken needle in the facial region of the patient. When confronted by the patient, Lieh-Mak maintained that the needle used in the electroconvulsive therapy, a common procedure practised in psychiatry, was put in and removed by a technician and that she had no responsibility for the mishap. This is in contradiction to one of her most controversial verdicts as Chairperson of the Medical Council Inquiry. On 9 May 2018 a doctor was found guilty of medical misconduct for failing to supervise his fellow nursing staff to perform standard tracheostomy care even though the doctor was not involved in the procedure, nor was he aware of that particular procedure which allegedly led to the patient's death.
