= Moses Cheng =

Moses M.C. Cheng (Traditional Chinese: 鄭慕智) is a lawyer by profession and a major contributor in the public domain of Hong Kong.

An alumnus of St. Paul's Co-educational College and a former member of the Hong Kong Legislative Council, some of his major past and current public services appointments include: Chairman of the Board of Education, Member of the Education Commission, Chairman of the Council and Court of the Hong Kong Baptist University, Chairman of the Committee for the Promotion of Civic Education, Founding Chairman of the Hong Kong Institute of Directors. A senior partner of P.C. Woo & Co., he was later appointed the Football Betting & Lotteries Commission Chairman in 2003.

Cheng declared himself a member of the Hong Kong Golf Club on 23 August 2022 after his initial declaration, and said "I didn't think there was any need to declare a membership in privately run clubs and organizations."

On 14 January 2024, Cheng was appointed as Honorary Lay Canon of St. John's Cathedral in Hong Kong Sheng Kung Hui.

Order of precedence
Preceded by Chris Tang; Secretary for Security	Hong Kong order of precedence Member of the Executive Council	Succeeded by Margaret Leung; Member of the Executive Council
