= Lam Kui-chun =

Hong Kong (born 1941)

Lam Kui-chun 林鉅津

Member of the Legislative Council
- In office 9 October 1991 – 31 July 1995
- Appointed by: David Wilson

Personal details
- Born: 20 November 1941 (age 84) Macau
- Party: Liberal Party (since 1993)
- Spouse: Loretta Lui
- Children: 2
- Occupation: Medical Doctor

Lam Kui-chun (born 20 November 1941, Macau) is a member of the Liberal Party and was the unofficial member of the Legislative Council of Hong Kong (1991–95).
