= Lau Wah-sum =

Hong Kong politician

Lau Wah-sum 劉華森

Member of the Legislative Council
- In office 12 October 1988 – 31 July 1995
- Appointed by: David Wilson

Personal details
- Born: 30 January 1928 (age 98) Hong Kong
- Party: Liberal Party (1993-)
- Spouse: Ho Kam-ching
- Children: 4
- Education: University of Oxford
- Occupation: Financial and management consultant

Lau Wah-sum, OBE, GBS JP (born 30 January 1928) is a member of the Liberal Party and was the unofficial member of the Legislative Council of Hong Kong (1988—95).

He is a registered investment adviser, fellow of Hong Kong Society of Accountants (FHKSA) and the Chartered Institute of Management Accountants (FCMA). During the 1970s, Lau was the first Director of Finance of the Mass Transit Railway Corporation.
