= Fung Chi-wood =

- 馮智活
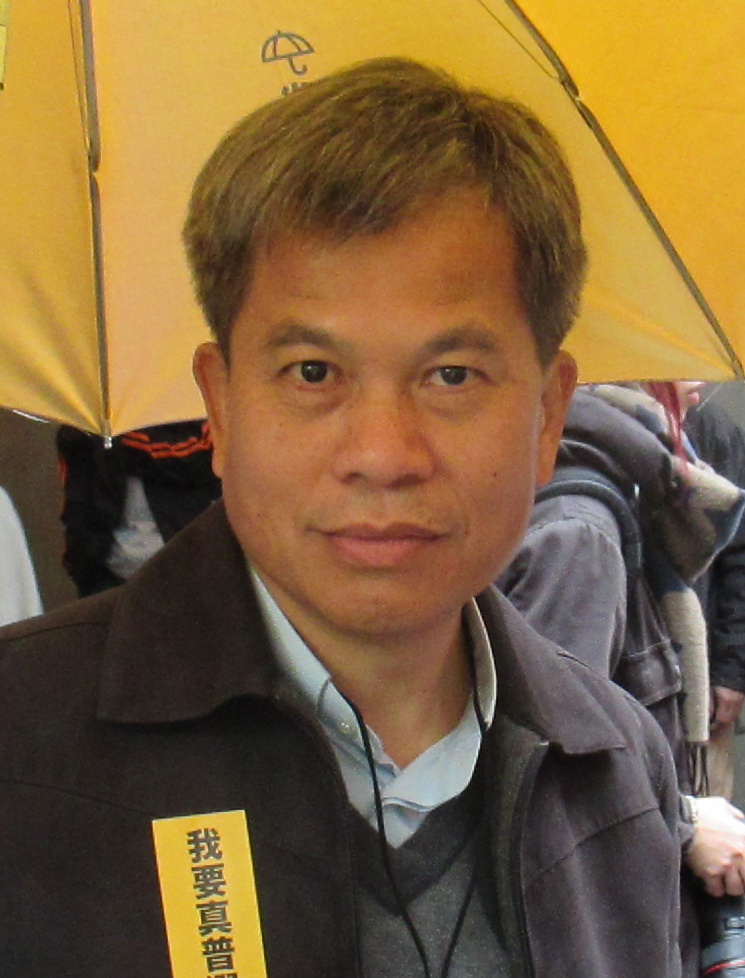

Member of the Legislative Council
- In office 9 October 1991 – 31 July 1995
- Constituency: New Territories North

Personal details
- Born: 23 August 1956 Hong Kong
- Party: Association for Democracy and People's Livelihood (1980s); United Democrats (1990–94); Democratic Party (1994–2001); Social Democratic Forum (2000–02); The Frontier (2002–08)
- Education: University of Hong Kong (BSc); Chinese University of Hong Kong (Master of Divinity)
- Occupation: Pastor
- Website: fungchiwood.com

Fung Chi-wood
- Traditional Chinese: 馮智活
- Simplified Chinese: 冯智活
Transcriptions
Standard Mandarin
- Hanyu Pinyin: Féng Zhìhuó
Yue: Cantonese
- Yale Romanization: Fùhng Ji wuht
- Jyutping: Fung^{4} Zi^{3} wut^{6}

Fung Chi-wood (Chinese: 馮智活, 23 August 1956) is an Anglican priest in Hong Kong, and once served as a member of the Legislative Council of Hong Kong, Regional Council, Shatin District Board Member.

He was famous for leading the movement against the Daya Bay Nuclear Plant in 1986 and continued to be active in the pro-democracy camp after the handover of Hong Kong.
