= Steven Poon =

Steven Poon BBS, JP
- 潘國濂

Member of the Legislative Council
- In office 9 October 1991 – 31 July 1995
- Appointed by: David Wilson

Personal details
- Born: 9 July 1943 (age 83) Guangzhou, China
- Party: Liberal Party
- Spouse: Poon Wong Wai-ping
- Children: 2
- Education: National Taiwan University; University of Hong Kong
- Occupation: Businessman

Steven Poon Kwok-lim (born 9 July 1943) was an appointed member of the Legislative Council of Hong Kong (1991–95) and member of the Kowloon City District Board (1994–99) for Kowloon Tong.

Poon was born in Guangzhou. He was a member of the Hong Kong Stock Exchange, Hong Kong University of Science and Technology and Hong Kong Institution of Engineers.

Political offices
Preceded by Yung Ching-tat	Member of Kowloon City District Board; Representative for Kowloon Tong; 1994–1999	Succeeded by Ho Hin-ming
Party political offices
New office	Vice-Chairperson of the Liberal Party; 1996–1998; Served alongside: Ronald Arculli	Succeeded by Selina Chow
