= Samuel Wong (politician) =

Samuel Wong Ping-wai 黃秉槐 MBE, JP

Member of the Legislative Council
- In office 9 October 1991 – 4 June 1997
- Preceded by: New constituency
- Succeeded by: Vacant
- Constituency: Engineering

Personal details
- Born: 2 November 1937 Hong Kong
- Died: 4 June 1997 (aged 59) Hong Kong
- Spouse: Clarisse Cheung Suk-woon
- Children: 3
- Education: University of Strathclyde, University of Wales
- Occupation: Consulting engineer

Samuel Wong Ping-wai, MBE, JP (2 November 1937, Hong Kong – 4 June 1997, Hong Kong) was a member of the Legislative Council of Hong Kong (1991–97) and also the Urban Council of Hong Kong.

== His Death and His Family ==
Samuel Wong died of a heart attack on 4 June 1997 in Hong Kong. At that time, he had three children: Andrew Wong, Adrian Wong and a daughter. His 2 grandchildren were born later in 2008 and 2009. Samuel was buried at a local graveyard in Chai Wan, Hong Kong.
