= Man Sai-cheong =

- 文世昌

Member of the Legislative Council
- In office 9 October 1991 – 31 July 1995
- Preceded by: Chan Ying-lun
- Succeeded by: Christine Loh
- Constituency: Hong Kong Island East

Personal details
- Born: 15 July 1944 Hong Kong
- Died: 4 April 2015 (aged 70) Toronto, Canada
- Party: Hong Kong Affairs Society (1984–90); United Democrats (1990–94); Democratic Party (1994)
- Spouse: Gloria Man
- Education: Queen's College; University of Hong Kong; University of London
- Occupation: Solicitor

Man Sai-cheong
- Chinese: 文世昌
Transcriptions
Standard Mandarin
- Hanyu Pinyin: Wén Shìchāng
Yue: Cantonese
- Yale Romanization: Màhn Sai chēung
- Jyutping: Man^{4} Sai^{3} coeng^{1}

Man Sai-cheong, (Chinese: 文世昌; 15 July 1944 – 4 April 2015) was a member of the Legislative Council of Hong Kong (1991–95), Urban Council of Hong Kong (1986–95) and Eastern District Board (1988–94).

== Biography ==
Born on 15 July 1944 in Hong Kong, Man was educated at the Queen's College and attended the University of Hong Kong and received degrees in Bachelor of Arts and Master of Philosophy. He later on got a diploma in library studies at the University of London. He was also a solicitor.

He was one of the founding members of the Meeting Point, a liberal political group set up in 1983 for the democratic government in Hong Kong under Chinese rule after 1997 and a core member of the Hong Kong Affairs Society, which was set up in 1984 for the discussion of the Hong Kong sovereignty after 1997. He advocated the implementation of the promise of the "Hong Kong people ruling Hong Kong" guaranteed in the Sino-British Joint Declaration. In the 1985, he was appointed to the Hong Kong Basic Law Consultative Committee for consultation for the drafting of the Hong Kong Basic Law.

Having a strong local networks in the Eastern District, Man was first elected to the Urban Council in the 1986 election and the Eastern District Board in the 1988 election. In the first direct election for the Legislative Council in 1991, he paired up Martin Lee to contest in the Hong Kong Island East constituency for the first pro-democratic party the United Democrats of Hong Kong and both got elected.

He emigrated to Canada before the handover of Hong Kong in 1996 and opened an English bookstore nearby the University of Toronto collecting books related to Chinese affairs. He became a commentator in a Chinese local radio and columnist for many local Chinese newspaper. He died of cancer on 4 April 2015, aged 70.

Political offices
Preceded by Kwan Lim-ho	Member of the Urban Council; Representative for North Point; 1986–1995	Succeeded by Jennifer Chow
Preceded by Lai Shiu-lam	Member of the Eastern District Board; Representative for Causeway Bay North; 1988–1991; With: Jennifer Chow	Succeeded by Jennifer Chow
New constituency	Member of the Eastern District Board; Representative for Causeway Bay East; 1991–1994	Constituency abolished
Legislative Council of Hong Kong
Preceded by Chan Ying-lun	Member of Legislative Council; Representative for Hong Kong Island East; 1991–1995; With: Martin Lee	Succeeded by Christine Loh
