= Alfred Tso =

Alfred Tso 曹紹偉

Member of the Legislative Council
- In office 6 August 1993 – 31 July 1995
- Preceded by: Gilbert Leung
- Succeeded by: Ngan Kam-chuen
- Constituency: Regional Council

Personal details
- Born: 11 October 1951 (age 74) Hong Kong
- Education: Diocesan Boys' School; University of Minnesota (B.B.A.)
- Occupation: Company Director

Alfred Tso Shiu-wai (born 11 October 1951, in Hong Kong) was a member of the Legislative Council of Hong Kong (1993–95) replacing the Gilbert Leung for the Regional Council.

He was the elected member of the Tuen Mun District Board from 1982 to 1994. He was also elected to the Heung Yee Kuk in 1983. He was elected to the Regional Council of Hong Kong in 1991 and replaced the unseated Regional Council representative Gilbert Leung due to corruption allegations to the Legislative Council after winning in a by-election. He partnered Daniel Lam to contest the New Territories West in the 1998 Hong Kong legislative election but failed to go back to the LegCo.

He was also a member of the pro-Beijing Liberal Democratic Federation of Hong Kong.
