= Liberal Democratic Federation of Hong Kong =

Liberal Democratic Federation of Hong Kong 香港自由民主聯會
- Chairman: Hu Fa-kuang
- Vice-Chairmen: Philip Kwok; Maria Tam
- Founded: 6 November 1990
- Dissolved: 26 May 1997
- Merger of: Progressive Hong Kong; Society
- Merged into: Hong Kong Progressive; Alliance
- Ideology: Conservatism (HK); Economic liberalism
- Regional affiliation: Pro-Beijing camp
- Colours: Red, white and blue

The Liberal Democratic Federation of Hong Kong (Chinese: 香港自由民主聯會, abbreviated 自民聯; LDF) was a pro-Beijing pro-business and conservative political party in Hong Kong. It was established in 1990, and was composed of mainly conservative businessmen and professionals. It contested in the District Board elections, Urban and Regional Council elections and the first Legislative Council election in 1991 against the liberal United Democrats of Hong Kong (UDHK). It was merged into the Hong Kong Progressive Alliance in 1997. Chaired by Hu Fa-kuang and vice-chaired by Maria Tam and Philip Kwok, the leading figures included Tso Wung-wai, Howard Young, and Daniel Heung.

== History ==
The party was established by a group of conservative businesspeople and professionals in the Hong Kong Basic Law Consultative Committee (BLCC), Hong Kong Basic Law Drafting Committee (BLDC), which was often called the "Group of 89", and appointed members in the Legislative Council of Hong Kong (LegCo) who worried about welfare spending and adversarial on 6 November 1990, as the reaction to the liberals forming the United Democrats of Hong Kong (UDHK) on the eve of the first direct LegCo elections. The objective of party was to support candidates to fun in the upcoming elections. Due to lack of popular basis and experience, the group invited Maria Tam Wai-chu, member of the Executive and Legislative Councils and her Progressive Hong Kong Society (PHKS) to join, as well as four councillors from the Hong Kong Civic Association. Hu Fa-kuang became the founding chairman, while Maria Tam and Philip Kwok Chi-kuen the founding vice-chairmen.

The party won 24 seats in the 1991 District Board elections, 3 seats in the 1991 Urban and Regional Councils elections and 3 seats in the 1991 LegCo elections of which were all from functional constituencies. The party's pro-Beijing and business-oriented images faced competition from new parties the Beijing-loyalist Democratic Alliance for the Betterment of Hong Kong (DAB) and pro-business Liberal Party established in 1992 and 1993 respectively. All three LegCo members, Ngai Shiu-kit, Howard Young and Peter Wong left the party for the Liberal Party in 1993.

The party gained back 1 seat in 1995 LegCo elections from the Election Committee with David Chu Yu-lin. In 1997, the party was merged into another pro-business pro-Beijing party Hong Kong Progressive Alliance.

== Former LegCo members ==
- Michael Cheng
- David Chu
- Chung Pui-lam
- Ngai Shiu-kit
- Maria Tam
- James Tien
- Alfred Tso
- Peter Wong
- Howard Young

== Election performance ==
=== Legislative Council elections ===
Election	Number of popular votes	% of popular votes	GC seats	FC seats	EC seats	Total seats	+/−
1991	70,697	5.16	0	3	—	3 / 60	3▼
1995	11,572▼	1.27▼	0	0	1	1 / 60	0

=== Municipal elections ===
Election	Number of popular votes	% of popular votes	UrbCo seats	RegCo seats	Total elected seats
1991	39,139	9.99	2 / 15	1 / 12	3 / 27
1995	25,398▼	4.55▼	1 / 32	3 / 27	4 / 59

=== District Board elections ===
Election	Number of popular votes	% of popular votes	Total elected seats	+/−
1991	47,633	8.96	24 / 272	
1994	25,499▼	3.72▼	11 / 346	▼5

== See also ==
- Politics of Hong Kong
- List of political parties in Hong Kong
