= United Democrats of Hong Kong =

Political party in Hong Kong

United Democrats of Hong Kong 香港民主同盟
- Chairman: Martin Lee
- Vice-Chairmen: Yeung Sum; Albert Ho
- Founded: 23 April 1990
- Dissolved: 2 October 1994
- Succeeded by: Democratic Party
- Ideology: Liberalism (HK); Liberal democracy
- Regional affiliation: Pro-democracy camp
- Colours: Green

United Democrats of Hong Kong
- Traditional Chinese: 香港民主同盟
Transcriptions
Yue: Cantonese
- Jyutping: Hoeng^{1}gong^{2} Man^{4}zyu^{2} Tung^{4}mang^{4}

The United Democrats of Hong Kong (Chinese: 香港民主同盟, 港同盟; UDHK) was the first political party in Hong Kong. Founded in 1990, the short-lived party was the united front of the liberal democracy forces in preparation of the 1991 first ever direct election for the Legislative Council of Hong Kong. The party won a landslide victory by sweeping 12 of the 18 directly elected seats in the election which shook the political landscape of Hong Kong. In 1994 it was merged with another pro-democracy party Meeting Point to form the contemporary Democratic Party.

== Platform ==
The main objectives of Democrats are to maintain the prosperity and stability of Hong Kong, to better the welfare and quality of life of the people of Hong Kong; and to strengthen the position of Hong Kong as an industrial, commercial and international financial centre. In pursuit of these aims, the party strived

1. to promote and facilitate the implementation of the Sino-British Joint Declaration,
2. to promote, establish and uphold a democratic, open and accountable government in Hong Kong;
3. to safeguard the rule of law, human rights, civil liberties and social justice,
4. to promote and facilitate the full implementation of the provision of the International Covenant on Civil and Political Rights, and the International Covenant on Economic, Social and Cultural Rights;
5. to cultivate civic consciousness and promote participation in public affairs;
6. to enhance and improve productivity and facilitate economic development and progress,
7. to improve people's livelihood, especially in the areas of education, medical services, housing and transport;
8. to promote better social security and a comprehensive welfare system that is appropriate for the circumstances of Hong Kong;
9. to support suitable members of the United Democrats of Hong Kong to stand for or otherwise participate in elections;
10. to promote and facilitate the interflow in know-how, technology, telecommunication, education, culture and sports with other countries and regions.

== Structure ==
The United Democrats had a large labour component among its top leadership. 6 of its 30 Central Committee members, including Szeto Wah and Lau Chin-shek, were leaders of the major independent unions, namely the Hong Kong Professional Teachers' Union (PTU) and the Hong Kong Christian Industrial Committee (CIC) respectively. They are veterans of labour protests and community movements. Some other core members of the party were experienced in collective mobilisation and electoral campaigns, such as Tuen Mun's Ng Ming-yum and Sha Tin's Lau Kong-wah and Wong Hong-chung and Eastern District's Man Sai-cheong who brought their local networks into the party.

== History ==
The United Democrats of Hong Kong was established on 23 April 1990 as a grand alliance of the pro-democracy activists. As early as 1988, the pro-democratic groups including the Meeting Point, the Hong Kong Affairs Society (HKAS) and the Association for Democracy and People's Livelihood (ADPL), the three major pro-democracy groups at the time had already formed the Joint Committee on the Promotion of Democratic Government (JCPDG) for the 1988 direction election for the Legislative Council. Soon after the Tiananmen Square protests of 1989, the pro-democracy camp decided to come together to resist the foreseeing pressure from Beijing after 1997. The preparatory committee was formed by individuals from the pro-democracy pressure groups and unions, such as Lau Chin-shek from the Hong Kong Christian Industrial Committee (HKCIC), Cheung Man-kwong and Szeto Wah from the Hong Kong Professional Teachers' Union (HKPTU) and Michael Ho from the Association of Hong Kong Nursing Staff (AHKNS). Frederick Fung Kin-kee, chairman of the ADPL later quit the preparatory committee as he said the stance of the United Democrats did not fit the pro-grassroots stance of the ADPL.

On 23 April 1990, the party was officially launched by some 220 activists and mostly service professionals from the ranks of social workers, teachers, university professors, independent union activists, church leaders, and lawyers. In July, it held the party's first general meeting. It soon opened six district branches and extended to nine after the 1991 Legislative Council election. It was headed by barrister Martin Lee, as well as Szeto Wah who remained the leader of the Hong Kong Alliance in Support of Patriotic Democratic Movements in China. As such, the party was labelled "anti-Beijing" as their support for the democratic movements in China.

After the United Democrats gained a landslide victory in the Urban Council and Regional Council elections in 1991, it began to prepare for the first direct election in September. However the fight for the candidacy led to many members returning to their original organisations, such as Meeting Point's Li Wah-ming, Zachary Wong and Tik Chi-yuen. The United Democrats also failed to reach agreement with the ADPL in Kowloon West. At last, the United Democrats formed an electoral alliance with the Meeting Point. The party won a landslide victory, winning 12 of the 18 directly elected seats and two functional constituency seats due to the widespread of anti-Beijing sentiments after the Tiananmen crackdown and also the electoral system. On 17 September 1991, Martin Lee led a delegation of 14 Legislative Councillors-elect from the United Democrats to meet the Governor David Wilson, demanded the Governor to respect the wishes of the people expressed in the election and filled the LegCo appointed seats with liberal-minded people.

In 1992, United Democrat Ng Ming-yum died suddenly and left his seat in the Legislative Council vacant. Vice-Chairman Albert Ho was defeated by rural leader Tang Siu-tong in the by-election. In 1993, Lau Kong-wah, a Sha Tin District Board member and Regional Councillor who did not follow the instruction from the party authority and Sha Tin District Board chairman Choy Kan-pui resigned from the party citing the party being too radical and confrontational. The two later formed the Civil Force, a pro-Beijing community organisation.

The United Democrats supported Chris Patten, the last Governor's controversial reform proposal which largely broadened the franchise and heavily criticised by Beijing. The party remained open critic of the Beijing policies. After the reform proposal was passed, the Beijing government set up the 57-member Preliminary Working Committee (PWC) for the preparation works of the establishment of Hong Kong Special Administrative Region and planning for an alternative body, the Provisional Legislative Council (PLC) to the 1995 elected legislature under Patten's proposal. No members from the United Democrats was appointed as PWC member or Hong Kong Affairs Advisor.

In preparation for the District Board elections in September 1994, the Urban and Regional elections in March 1995 and the first fully elected LegCo elections in September 1995, the United Democrats merged with another liberal party Meeting Point in April 1994 to form the Democratic Party.

== Electoral performance ==
=== Legislative Council elections ===
Election	Number of popular votes	% of popular votes	GC seats	FC seats	Total seats	+/−	Position
1991	618,209	45.15	12	2	14 / 60	12▲	1st▲

Note: Each voter got two votes in the 1991 Election.

=== Municipal elections ===
Election	Number of popular votes	% of popular votes	UrbCo seats	RegCo seats	Total elected seats
1991	146,229	37.33	5 / 15	6 / 12	10 / 27

=== District Council elections ===
Election	Number of popular votes	% of popular votes	Total elected seats
1991	109,747	20.64	52 / 272
