= 2016 Hong Kong legislative election in Kowloon West =

- 4 September 2016

All 6 Kowloon West seats to the Legislative Council
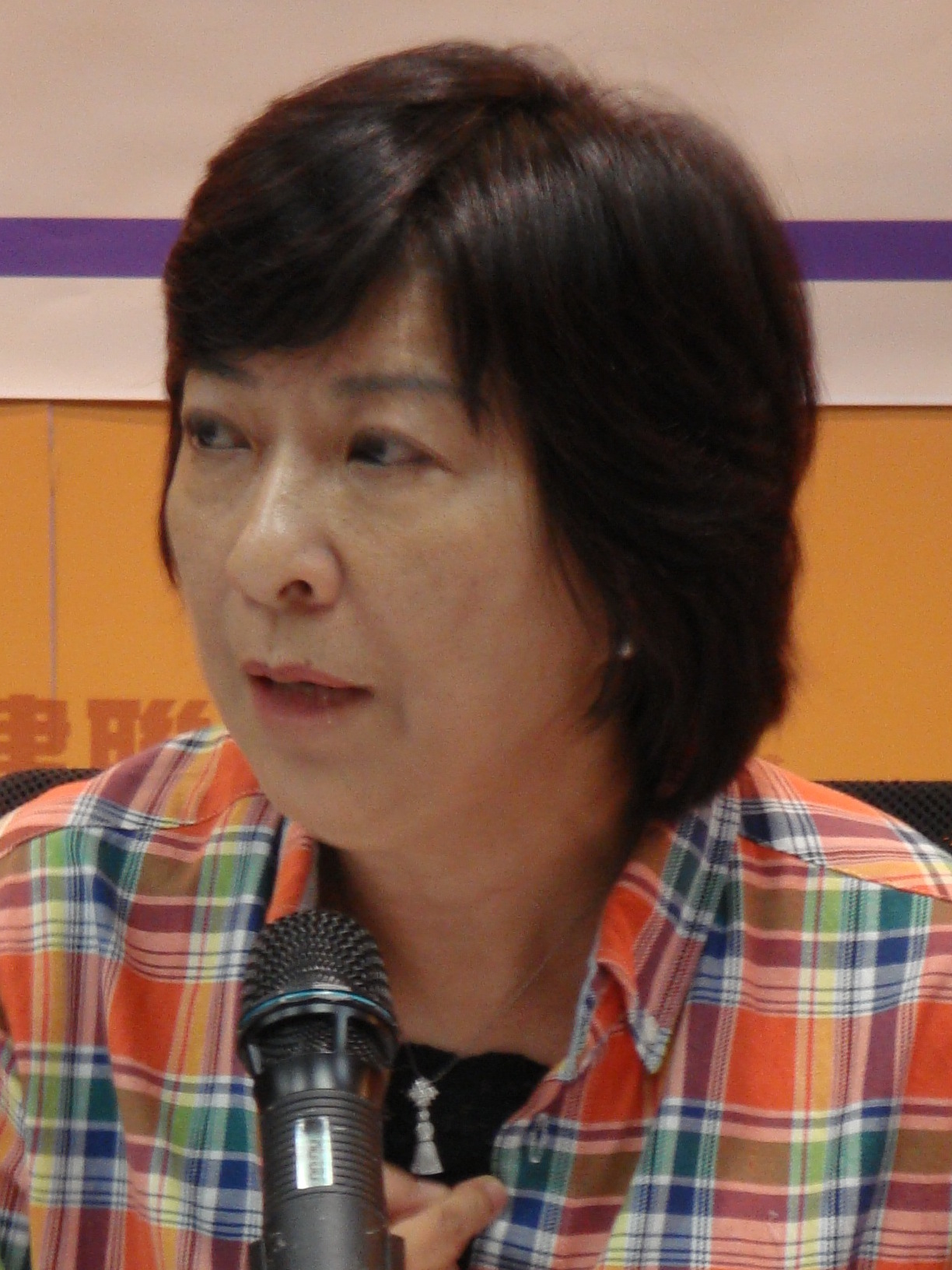

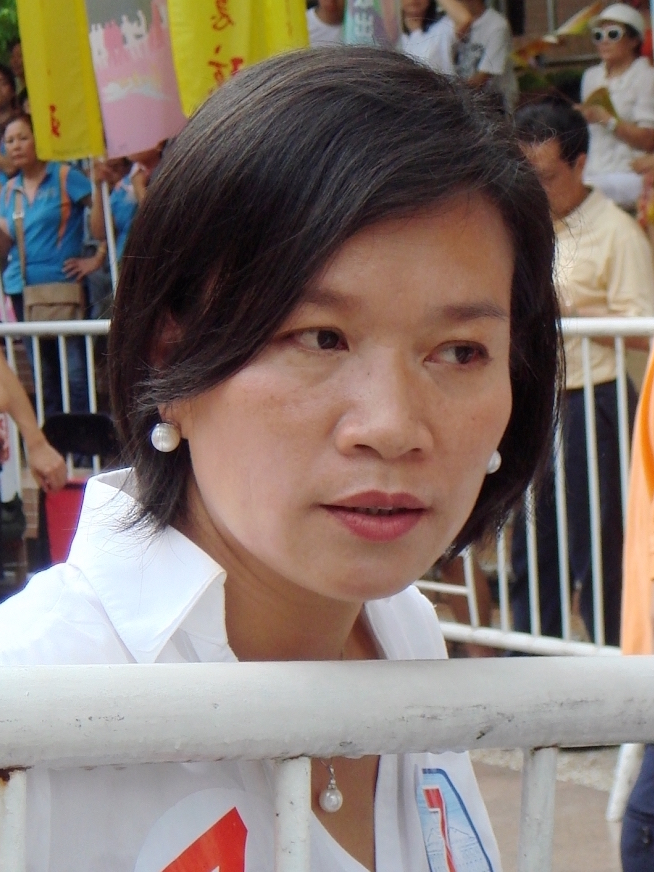

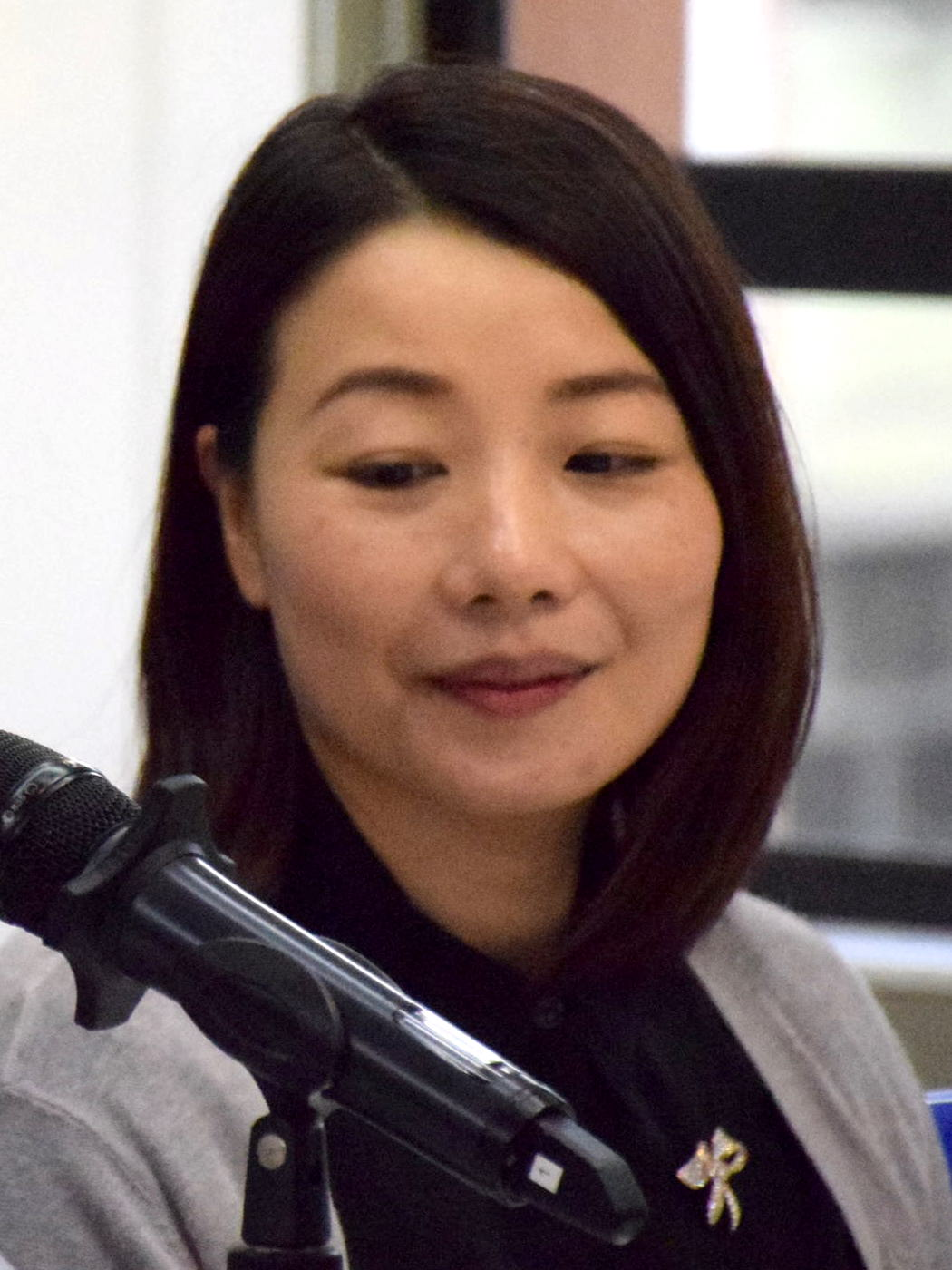

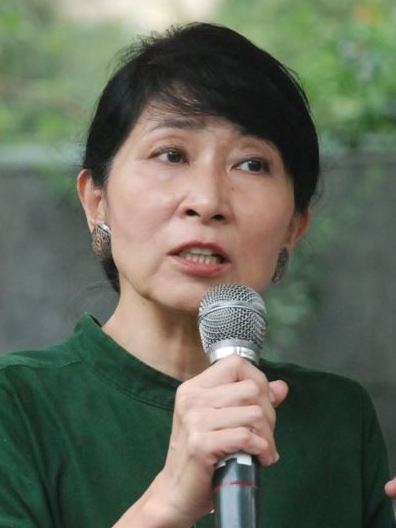

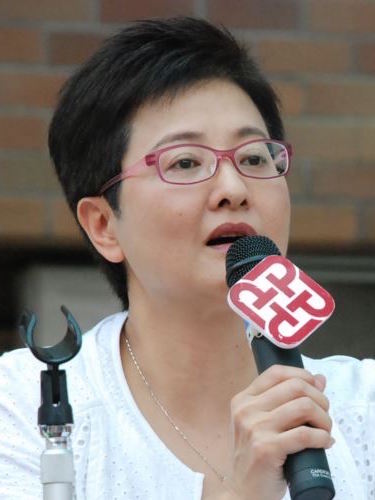

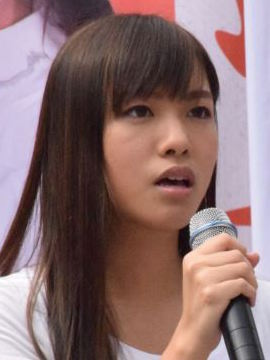
	First party	Second party	Third party
Leader	Ann Chiang	Priscilla Leung	Lau Siu-lai
Party	DAB	BPA	Democracy Groundwork
Alliance	Pro-Beijing	Pro-Beijing	N/A
Last election	1 seat, 20.4%	1 seat, 14.9%	New party
Seats before	1	1	0
Seats won	1	1	1
Seat change	Steady	Steady	▲1
Popular vote	52,541	49,745	38,183
Percentage	18.8%	17.8%	13.7%
Swing	▼1.6%	▲3.0%	N/A
	Fourth party	Fifth party	Sixth party
Leader	Claudia Mo	Helena Wong	Yau Wai-ching
Party	Civic	Democratic	Youngspiration
Alliance	Pan-democracy	Pan-democracy	ALLinHK
Last election	1 seat, 16.3%	1 seat, 15.5%	New party
Seats before	1	1	0
Seats won	1	1	1
Seat change	Steady	Steady	▲1
Popular vote	37,925	26,037	20,643
Percentage	11.6%	9.3%	7.4%
Swing	▼4.8%	▼6.2%	N/A
- Party with most votes in each District Council Constituency.

These are the Kowloon West results of the 2016 Hong Kong Legislative Council election. The election was held on 4 September 2016 and all 6 seats in Kowloon West where consisted of Yau Tsim Mong District, Sham Shui Po District and Kowloon City District were contested, one extra than the previous election due to the increase of the population. Four of the five incumbents were returned to the legislature with radical democrat Wong Yuk-man lost to the newcomer Yau Wai-ching of radical localist group Youngspiration, who beat Wong by 424 votes. The extra seat was won by college lecturer Lau Siu-lai who advocated for "self-determination". All six winners were women.

== Overall results ==
Before election:

↓
3	2
Anti-establishment	Pro-establishment

Change in composition:

↓
4	2
Anti-establishment	Pro-establishment

Party	Seats	Seats change	Contesting list(s)	Votes	%	% change
DAB	1	0	1	52,541	18.8	–1.6
BPA/KWND	1	0	1	49,745	17.8	+3.0
Politihk SS	0	0	1	938	0.3	N/A
Pro-Beijing camp	2	0	3	103,224	37.0	+0.1
Civic	1	0	1	32,323	11.6	–4.8
Democratic	1	0	1	26,037	9.3	–6.2
ADPL	0	0	1	15,383	5.5	−7.7
LSD	0	0	1	6,811	2.4	N/A
Pioneer of Victoria Park	0	0	1	680	0.2	N/A
Independent	0	0	2	1,508	0.5	N/A
Pro-democracy camp	2	0	7	82,742	29.4	−33.3
Democracy Groundwork	1	+1	1	38,183	13.7	N/A
Youngspiration	1	+1	1	20,643	7.4	N/A
PPI	0	–1	1	20,219	7.3	−9.4
HKLP	0	0	1	399	0.1	N/A
Localist groups	2	+1	4	79,444	28.5	
Third Side	0	0	1	13,461	4.8	N/A
Turnout:				278,871	58.1	+4.2

== Candidates list ==
Vote share
1. DAB (18.8%)
2. BPA (17.8%)
3. DG (13.7%)
4. Civic (11.6%)
5. Democratic (9.34%)
6. Youngspiration (7.40%)
7. PPI (7.25%)
8. ADPL (5.52%)
9. Third Side (4.83%)
10. LSD (2.44%)
11. Politihk SS (0.34%)
12. PVP (0.24%)
13. HKLP (0.14%)
14. Other (0.54%)

Legislative Election 2016: Kowloon West
List	Candidates	Votes	Of total (%)	± from prev.
DAB	Ann Chiang Lai-wan Chris Ip Ngo-tung, Chan Wai-ming, Sin Tin-hung, Cheung Tak-wai	52,541	18.84 (16.67+2.17)	–1.57
BPA (KWND)	Leung Mei-fun Leung Man-kwong, Cho Wui-hung, Kacee Ting Wong, Leung Yuen-ting, Chan Kwok-wai	49,745	17.84 (16.67+1.17)	+2.95
Democracy Groundwork	Lau Siu-lai	38,183	13.69	N/A
Civic	Claudia Mo Man-ching Joshua Li Chun-hei	32,323	11.59	–4.75
Democratic	Wong Pik-wan Yuen Hoi-man, Joshua Fung Man-tao, Chau Man-fong	26,037	9.34	–6.18
Youngspiration	Yau Wai-ching	20,643	7.40	N/A
PPI	Wong Yuk-man, Ma Yu-sang	20,219	7.25	–9.37
ADPL	Tam Kwok-kiu, Yeung Yuk, Wong Wing-kit	15,383	5.52	–7.68
Third Side	Tik Chi-yuen, Wong Chun-long, Pang Yi-ting, Chen Lihong	13,461	4.83	N/A
LSD	Avery Ng Man-yuen	6,811	2.44	N/A
Politihk SS	Kwan San-wai, Ko Chi-keung	938	0.34	N/A
Nonpartisan	Augustine Lee Wing-hon, Foo Wai-lok	874	0.31	N/A
Pioneer of Victoria Park	Chu Siu-hung	680	0.24	N/A
Independent	Lam Yi-lai, Au Wing-ho	634	0.23	–0.14
HKLP	Jonathan Ho Chi-kwong	399	0.14	N/A
Total valid votes		278,871	100.00	
Rejected ballots		4,883		
Turnout		283,754	58.13	+4.24
Registered electors		488,129		

== See also ==
- Legislative Council of Hong Kong
- Hong Kong legislative elections
- 2016 Hong Kong legislative election
