= 2012 Hong Kong legislative election in Kowloon West =

- 9 September 2012

All 5 Kowloon West seats to the Legislative Council
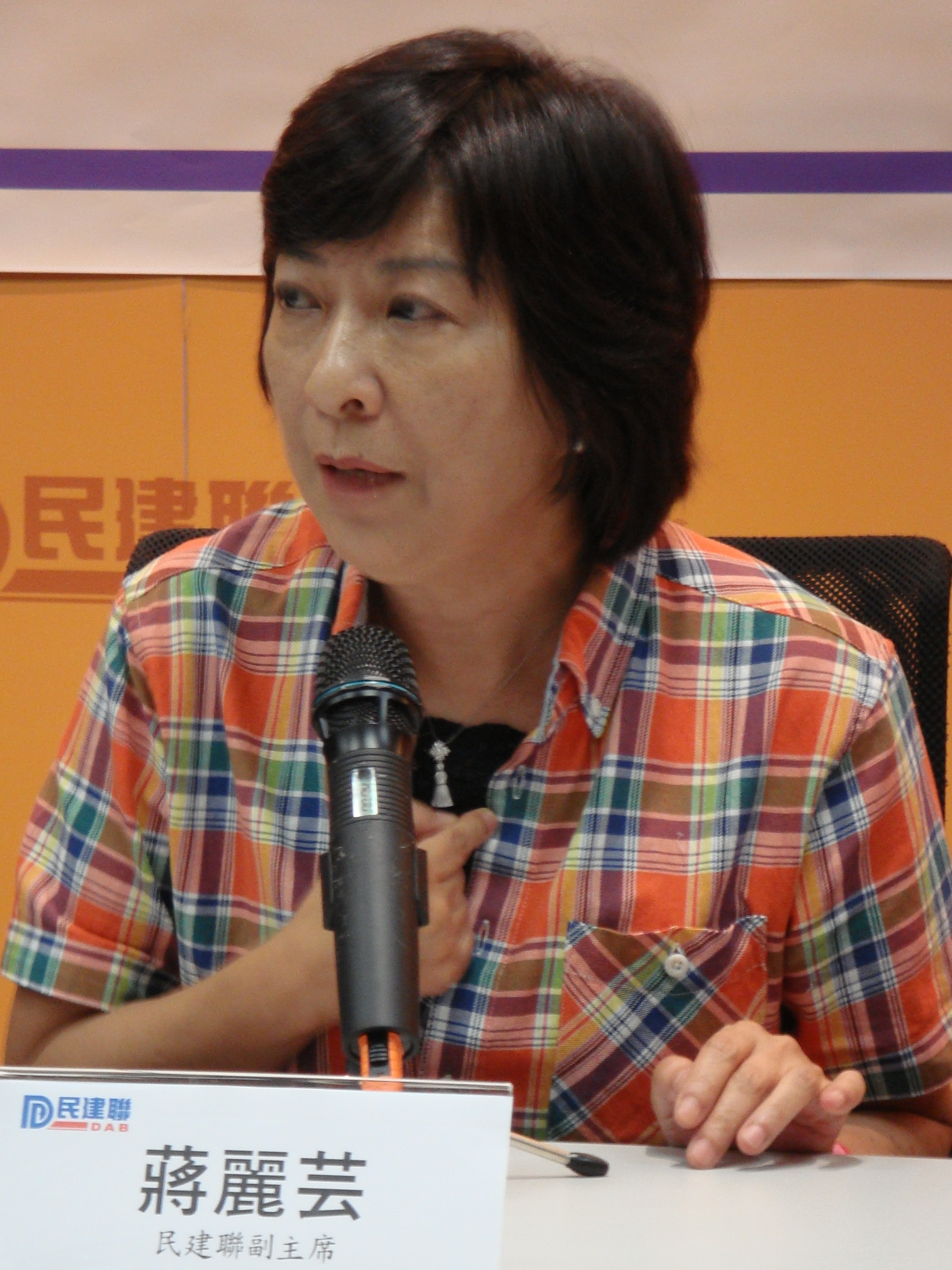

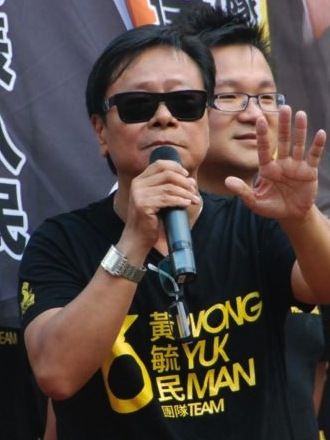

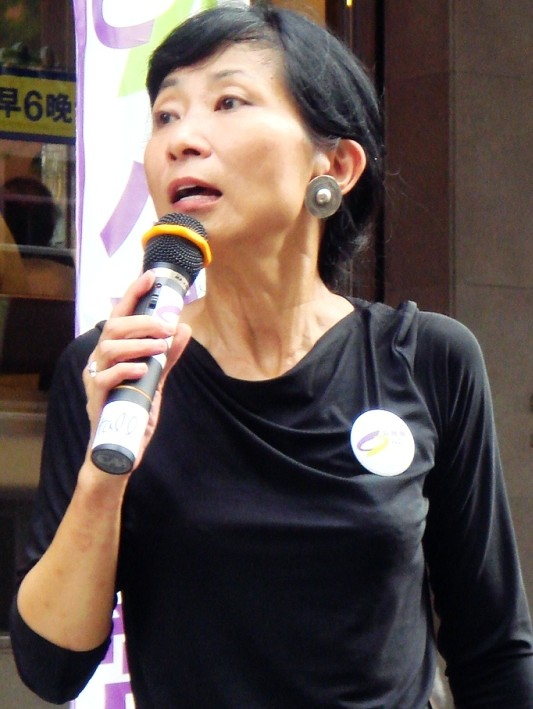

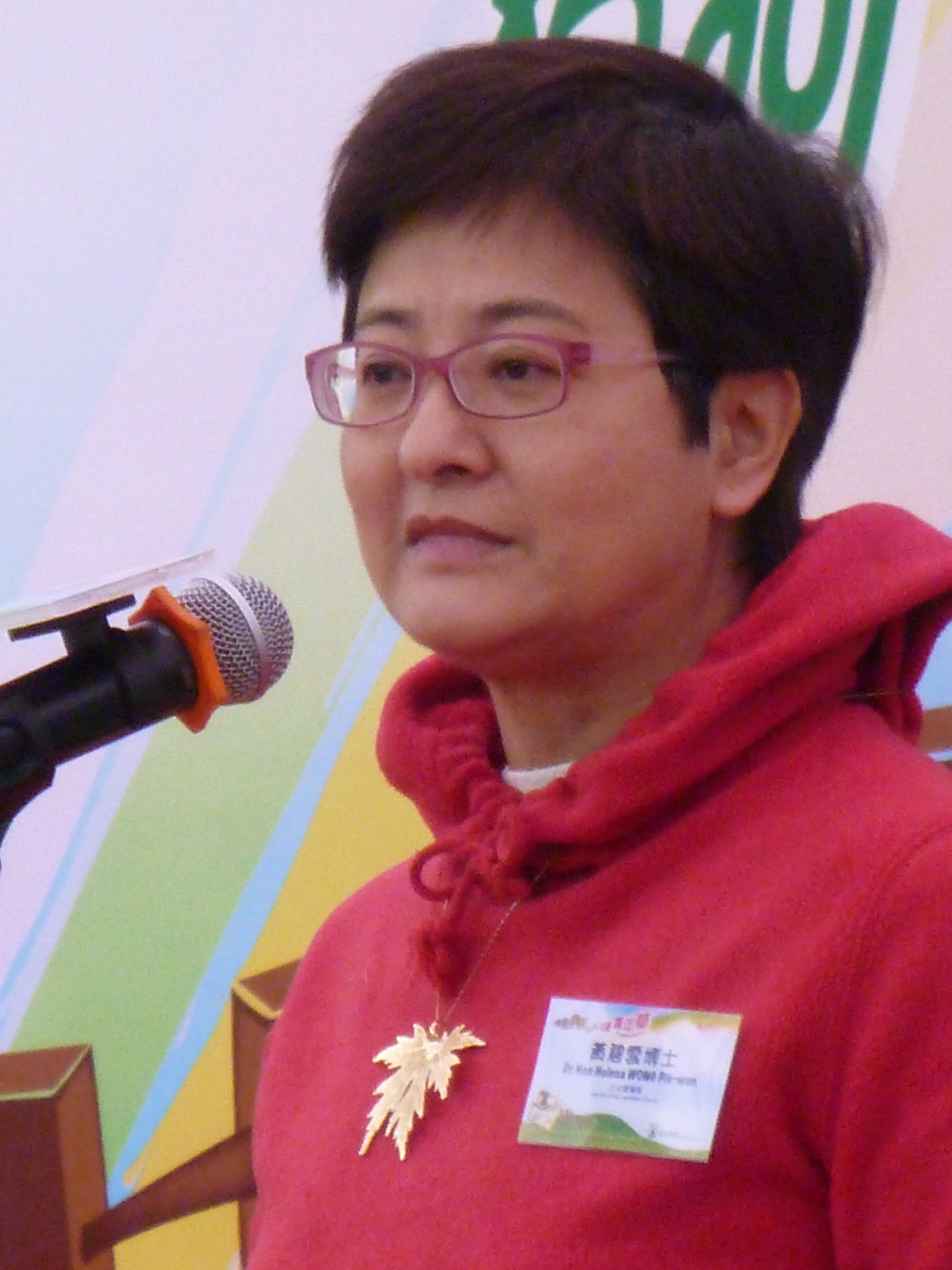

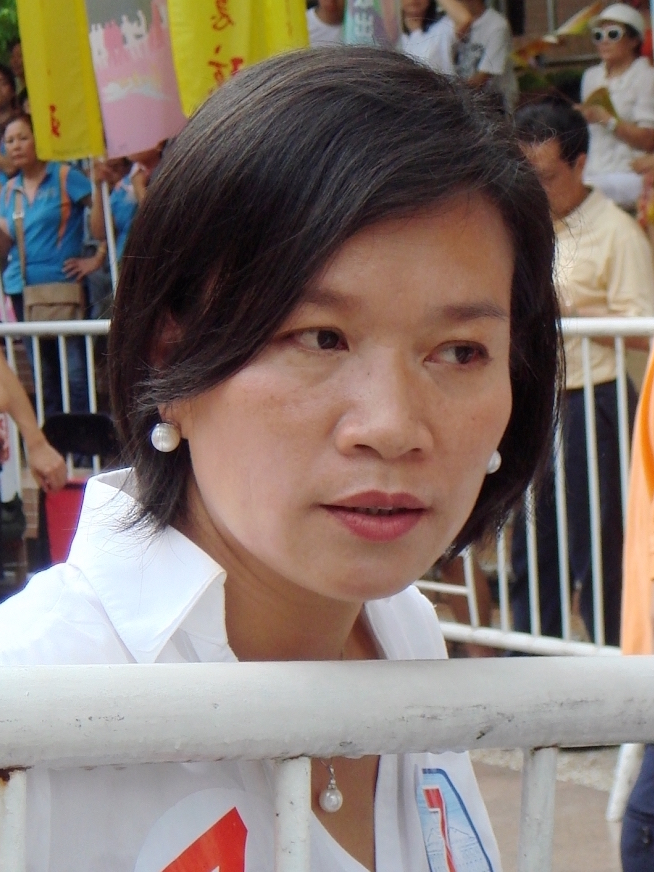

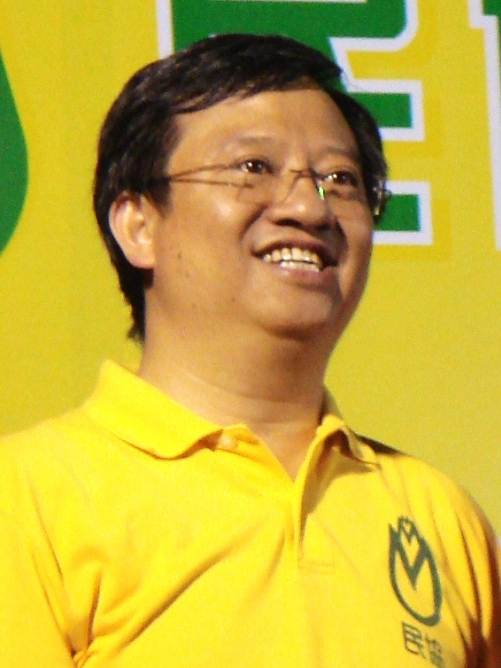
	First party	Second party	Third party
Leader	Ann Chiang	Wong Yuk-man	Claudia Mo
Party	DAB	People Power	Civic
Alliance	Pro-Beijing	Pan-democracy	Pan-democracy
Last election	1 seat, 18.9%	1 seat, 18.2%	0 seat, 8.4%
Seats before	1	1	0
Seats won	1	1	1
Seat change	Steady	Steady	▲1
Popular vote	47,363	38,578	37,925
Percentage	20.4%	16.6%	16.3%
Swing	▲0.2%	▼0.2%	▲7.9%
	Fourth party	Fifth party	Sixth party
Leader	Helena Wong	Priscilla Leung	Tam Kwok-kiu
Party	Democratic	KWND	ADPL
Alliance	Pan-democracy	Pro-Beijing	Pan-democracy
Last election	1 seat, 14.4%	1 seat, 9.6%	1 seat, 17.2%
Seats before	1	1	1
Seats won	1	1	0
Seat change	Steady	Steady	▼1
Popular vote	36,029	34,548	35,440
Percentage	15.5%	14.9%	13.2%
Swing	▲1.1%	▲5.3%	▼4.0%
- Party with most votes in each District Council Constituency.

These are the Kowloon West results of the 2012 Hong Kong legislative election. The election was held on 9 September 2012 and all 5 seats in Kowloon West where consisted of Yau Tsim Mong District, Sham Shui Po District and Kowloon City District were contested. Ann Chiang replacing Starry Lee who contested the District Council (Second) functional constituency stood for the largest pro-Beijing party Democratic Alliance for the Betterment and Progress of Hong Kong. Association for Democracy and People's Livelihood's Tam Kwok-kiu replacing Frederick Fung who contested the new super seats as well, however lost to his ally Civic Party's Claudia Mo who was not elected in 2008. The ADPL once again lost all the seats in this stronghold since the 1998 election.

== Overall results ==
Before election:

↓
3	2
Pan-democracy	Pro-Beijing

Change in composition:

↓
3	2
Pan-democracy	Pro-Beijing

Party	Seats	Seats change	Contesting list(s)	Votes	%	% change
People Power	1	0	1	38,578	16.6	−0.2
Civic	1	+1	1	37,925	16.3	+7.9
Democratic	1	0	1	36,029	15.5	+1.1
ADPL	0	−1	1	30,364	13.2	−4.0
Independent	0	0	1	2,399	1.0	N/A
Pro-democracy camp	3	0	5	145,565	62.7	−1.7
DAB	1	0	1	47,363	20.4	+0.2
KWND	1	0	1	34,548	14.9	+5.3
Independent	0	0	1	3,746	1.6	N/A
Pro-Beijing camp	2	0	3	85,657	36.9	+2.1
Independent or others	0	0	1	859	0.4	N/A
Turnout:				232,081	53.3	

== Candidates list ==
Legislative Election 2012: Kowloon West
List	Candidates	Votes	Of total (%)	± from prev.
DAB	Chiang Lai-wan Chris Ip Ngo-tung, Vincent Cheng Wing-shun, Chan Wai-ming, Lam Sum-lim	47,363	20.41 (20+0.41)	+1.51
People Power	Wong Yuk-man Yim Tat-ming, Chau Tsun-kiu, Lau Tit-wai	38,578	16.62	−1.58
Civic	Claudia Mo Man-ching Joe Wong Tak-chuen	37,925	16.34	+7.94
Democratic	Wong Pik-wan Cheung Man-kwong, Li Yiu-kee, Yuen Hoi-man, Chong Miu-sheung	36,029	15.52	+1.12
KWND	Leung Mei-fun Yang Wing-kit, Wai Hoi-ying, Leung Man-kwong	34,548	14.89	+5.29
ADPL	Tam Kwok-kiu, Liu Sing-lee, Rosanda Mok Ka-han, Wong Chi-yung, Austen Ng Po-shan	30,634	13.20	−4.00
Independent	Wong Yee-him	3,746	1.61	N/A
Ind. democrat	Wong Yat-yuk	2,399	1.03	N/A
Awakening Association	Lam Yi-lai, Simon Ho Ka-kuen, Au Wing-ho, Lee Ka-wai	859	0.37	+0.07
Turnout		232,081	53.25	+6.07

== Results by districts ==
List	Candidates	Yau Tsim Mong	Sham Shui Po	Kowloon City	Total
Independent	Wong Yee-him	1.65	1.16	2.05	1.61
Democratic	Helena Wong	18.10	11.90	17.49	15.52
ADPL	Tam Kwok-kiu	6.67	21.71	8.91	13.20
Independent	Roger Wong	1.22	0.96	0.98	1.03
DAB	Ann Chiang	22.71	19.12	20.20	20.41
People Power	Wong Yuk-man	16.75	16.68	16.49	16.62
Awakening Association	Lam Yi-lai	0.53	0.35	0.29	0.37
KWND	Priscilla Leung	14.43	13.24	16.84	14.89
Civic	Claudia Mo	17.96	14.88	16.76	16.34

== See also ==
- Legislative Council of Hong Kong
- Hong Kong legislative elections
- 2012 Hong Kong legislative election
