= Whampoa East (constituency) =

Constituency of the Kowloon City District Council, Hong Kong

- Elected constituency for the Kowloon City District Council
- Boundary of Whampoa East in Kowloon City District
- District: Kowloon City
- Legislative Council constituency: Kowloon Central
- Population: 17,582 (2019)
- Electorate: 10,345 (2019)

Current constituency
- Created: 1994
- Number of members: One
- Member: Vacant
- Created from: Whampoa

Whampoa East is one of the 22 constituencies of the Kowloon City District Council. The seat elects one member of the council every four years. The boundary is loosely based on the eastern area of Whampoa Garden.

== Councillors represented ==
Election	Member	Party	%
1994	Wong Chi-keung	LDF	51.60
1999	Chan Ka-wai	Democratic	47.18
2003	Chan Ka-wai	Democratic	60.62
2007	Priscilla Leung Mei-fun	Nonpartisan	58.15
2011	Priscilla Leung Mei-fun	Nonpartisan→BPA/KWND	54.27
2015	Priscilla Leung Mei-fun	BPA/KWND	47.07
2019	Kwan Ka-lun→Vacant (Note: Resigned on 7 July 2021.)	Nonpartisan	57.66

== Election results ==
=== 2010s ===
Kowloon City District Council Election, 2019: Whampoa East
Party	Candidate	Votes	%	±%
Nonpartisan	Kwan Ka-lun	4,595	57.66	
BPA	Lee Chiu-yu	3,374	42.34	−4.76
Majority		1,221	15.32	
Turnout		7,994	77.29	
Nonpartisan gain from BPA		Swing		

Kowloon City District Council Election, 2015: Whampoa East
Party	Candidate	Votes	%	±%
KWND (BPA)	Leung Mei-fun	2,345	47.1	–7.2
Youngspiration	Yau Wai-ching	2,041	41.0	
Nonpartisan	Law Shek-ming	596	12.0	
Majority		304	6.1	–11.5
Turnout		5,031	55.2	
KWND hold		Swing		

Kowloon City District Council Election, 2011: Whampoa East
Party	Candidate	Votes	%	±%
Nonpartisan (KWND)	Leung Mei-fun	2,236	54.3	−3.9
Democratic	Wong Pik-wan	1,513	36.7	−5.1
People Power (Power Voters)	Jeff Au Yeung Ying-kit	371	9.0	
Majority		723	17.6	
Nonpartisan hold		Swing		

=== 2000s ===
Kowloon City District Council Election, 2007: Whampoa East
Party	Candidate	Votes	%	±%
Nonpartisan	Leung Mei-fun	1,726	58.2	
Democratic	Chan Ka-wai	1,242	41.8	
Nonpartisan gain from Democratic		Swing		

Kowloon City District Council Election, 2003: Whampoa East
Party	Candidate	Votes	%	±%
Democratic	Chan Ka-wai	1,847	60.6	+13.8
Nonpartisan	Cheung Yan-hong	1,200	39.4	
Democratic hold		Swing		

=== 1990s ===
Kowloon City District Council Election, 1999: Whampoa East
Party	Candidate	Votes	%	±%
Democratic	Chan Ka-wai	1,063	46.8	−1.2
DAB	Tsui Hung-ying	908	39.9	
Liberal	Law Siu-hung	282	12.4	
Democratic gain from HKPA		Swing		

Kowloon City District Board Election, 1994: Whampoa East
Party	Candidate	Votes	%	±%
LDF	Wong Chi-keung	1,051	51.1	
Democratic	Tse Kwong-wang	986	48.0	
LDF win (new seat)				
