= November 2018 Kowloon West by-election =

Legislative Council of Hong Kong election

2018 Kowloon West by-election
- 25 November 2018
- Turnout: 44.45%
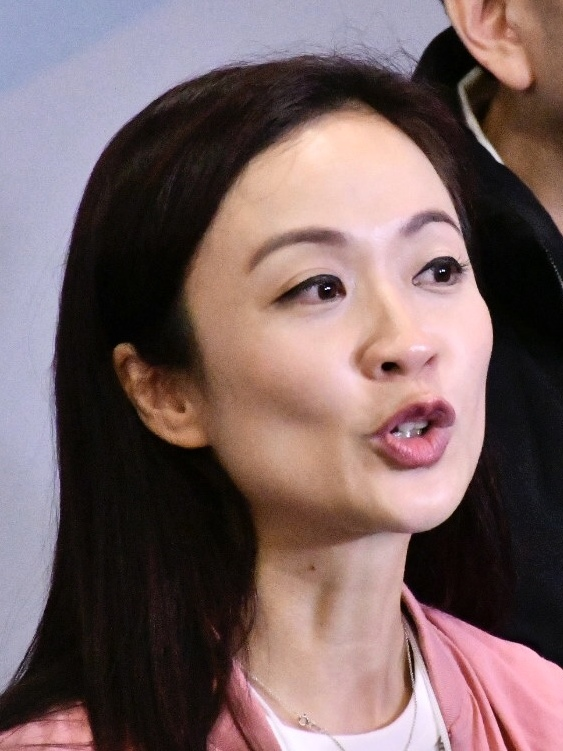

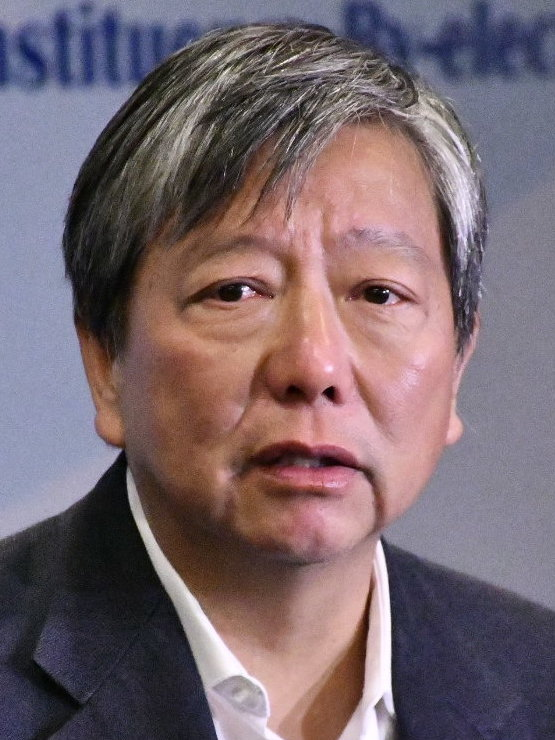

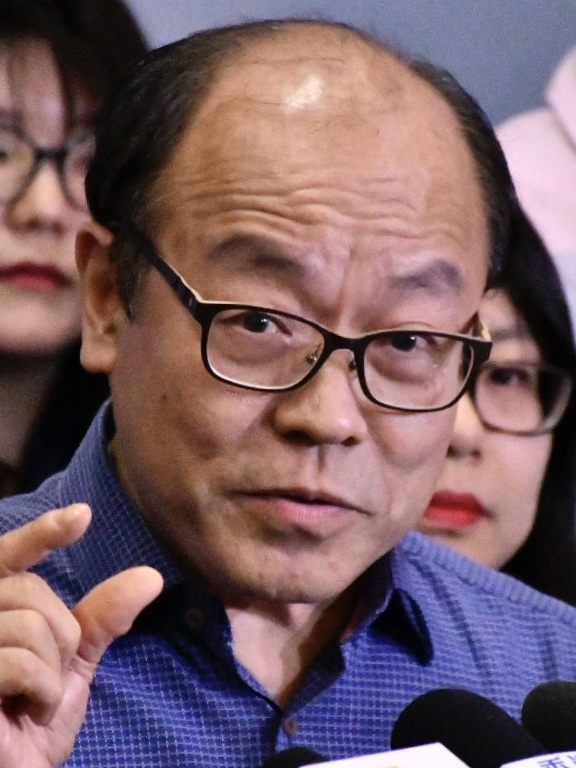
Candidate	Chan Hoi-yan	Lee Cheuk-yan	Frederick Fung
Party	Nonpartisan	Labour	Nonpartisan
Alliance	Pro-Beijing camp	Pro-democracy camp	N/A
Popular vote	106,457	93,047	12,509
Percentage	49.52%	43.28%	5.82%
- Candidates with most votes by each district (blue for Chan)
Legislative Councillor before election
Lau Siu-lai (disqualified)
Labour
Elected Legislative Councillor
Chan Hoi-yan
Nonpartisan

The 2018 Kowloon West by-election was held on 25 November 2018 after the incumbent pro-democracy Legislative Councillor Lau Siu-lai of Kowloon West was disqualified from the Legislative Council of Hong Kong (LegCo) after the oath-taking controversy resulted in the disqualifications of the six pro-democracy and localist legislators. It followed the by-election of four other vacated seats on 11 March 2018. Chan Hoi-yan, a nonpartisan backed by the pro-Beijing camp won over veteran democrat Lee Cheuk-yan of the Labour Party, a backup candidate for the pro-democracy camp after Lau's candidacy was disqualified.

The pro-democrats suffered another defeat in eight months after Yiu Chung-yim narrowly lost to Vincent Cheng of the Democratic Alliance for the Betterment and Progress of Hong Kong (DAB) in the same constituency in the March by-election. Frederick Fung, the former pro-democrat legislator who came third, was accused of "vote splitting". As a result, the pro-democracy camp failed to regain majority in the geographical constituencies which prevent the pro-Beijing camp to make changes to the legislature's Rule of Procedures to curb the pro-democrats opposition.

== Background ==
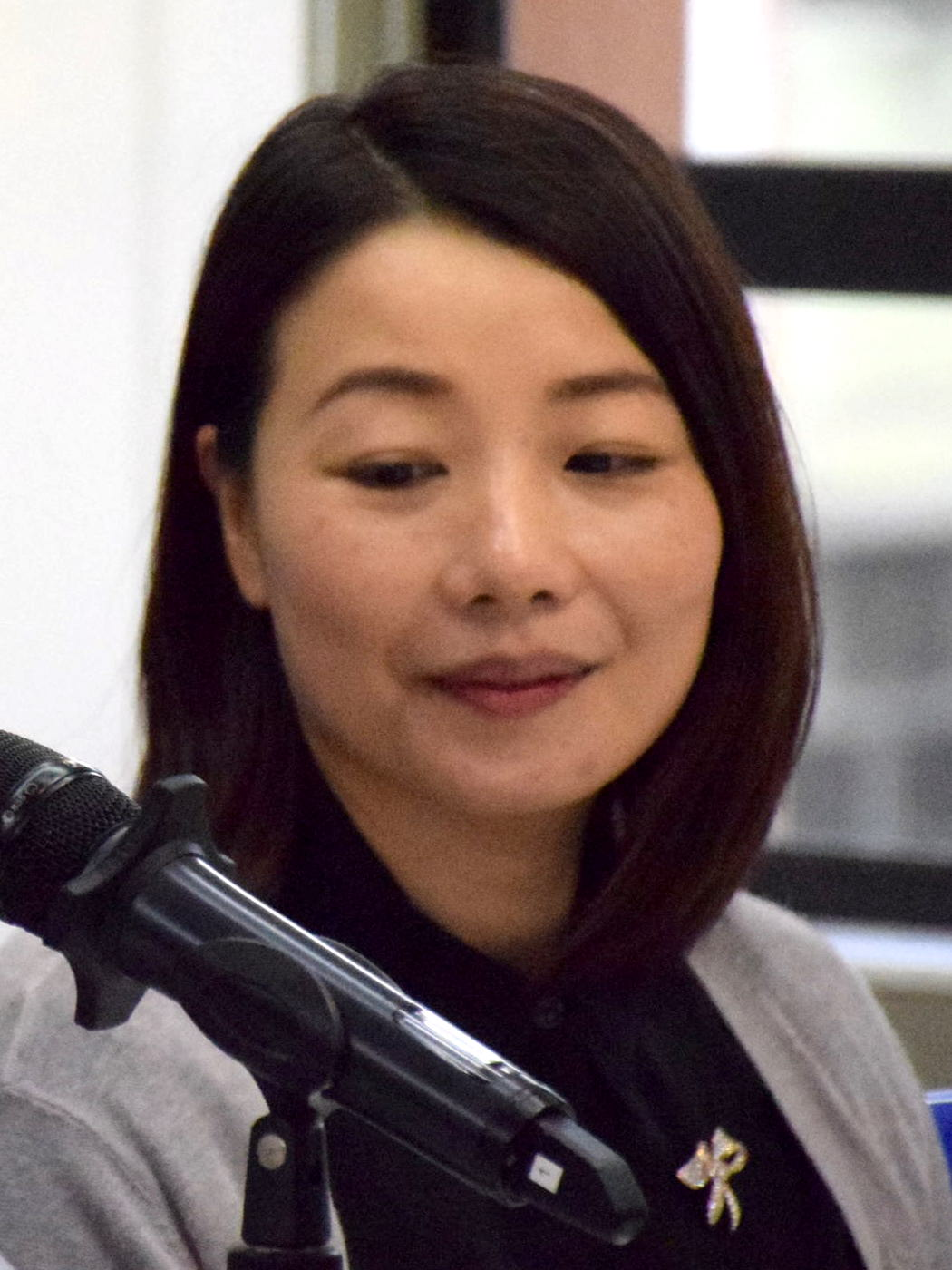
Lau Siu-lai, the incumbent legislator disqualified by the court over the oath-taking controversy.

In the 2016 Legislative Council election, the Kowloon West returned six members to the Legislative Council (LegCo), with college lecturer Lau Siu-lai being elected under the banner of "democratic self-determination".

On 12 October 2016 the inaugural meeting of the LegCo, Lau and other legislators-elect used the oath-taking ceremony as a platform to protest. After Yau Wai-ching and Sixtus Leung was controversially disqualified by the court following the interpretation of the Article 104 of the Basic Law of Hong Kong by the National People's Congress Standing Committee (NPCSC), Chief Executive Leung Chun-ying and Secretary for Justice Rimsky Yuen lodged another judicial review against Lau Siu-lai, as well as Nathan Law, Leung Kwok-hung and Yiu Chung-yim who also added words into or changed their tones when reading the oaths during the ceremony. As a result, the High Court ruled the four pro-democracy legislators were to lose their seats on 14 July 2017.

The by-election of the Hong Kong Island, New Territories East, Architectural, Surveying, Planning and Landscape as well as Yau Wai-ching's Kowloon West seats was held on 11 March 2018. Nevertheless, the by-elections of the Lau Siu-lai's Kowloon West and Leung Kwok-hung's New Territories East seats were not held as the duo were seeking for appeal, partly because they hoped to avoid holding the by-election for two seats in a single constituency which would favour the weaker pro-Beijing candidate. However, in the March Kowloon West by-election, the pro-Beijing Democratic Alliance for the Betterment and Progress of Hong Kong (DAB) candidate Vincent Cheng made an upset victory by defeating pro-democrat Yiu Chung-yim.

On 29 May 2018, Lau decided to retract her appeal against her disqualification due to the costly legal fees and time. On 26 June, the Electoral Affairs Commission (EAC) announced the by-election for Lau's seat to be held on 25 November 2018.

== Candidates ==
=== Validated ===
- Chan Hoi-yan, former journalist and political assistant to Secretary for Food and Health Ko Wing-man runs as an independent candidate supported by the pro-Beijing camp after the latter announced he would not run in the by-election
- Frederick Fung Kin-kee, former veteran legislator for Kowloon West and candidate for the pro-democracy primary of the March by-election has announced his candidacy. He criticised the pro-democracy camp for monopolising the candidate selection process by not holding a primary earlier and said he would bow out of the race if Lau Siu-lai was confirmed as the candidate.
- Lee Cheuk-yan, trade unionist and former veteran legislator of the Labour Party acted as a "plan B" candidate in case the candidacy of Lau Siu-lai, ousted legislator in the oath-taking controversy, was invalidated. Lee submitted his nomination on 12 October hours before Lau was informed that her candidacy was invalid.
- Ng Dick-hay, former spokesman of the pro-Beijing activist group Defend Hong Kong Campaign and candidate in the March Hong Kong Island by-election submitted his nomination on the last day of the nomination period.
- Judy Tzeng Li-wen, former member of People Power and a 2015 District Council election candidate also submitted her nomination on the last day of the nomination period.

=== Invalidated ===
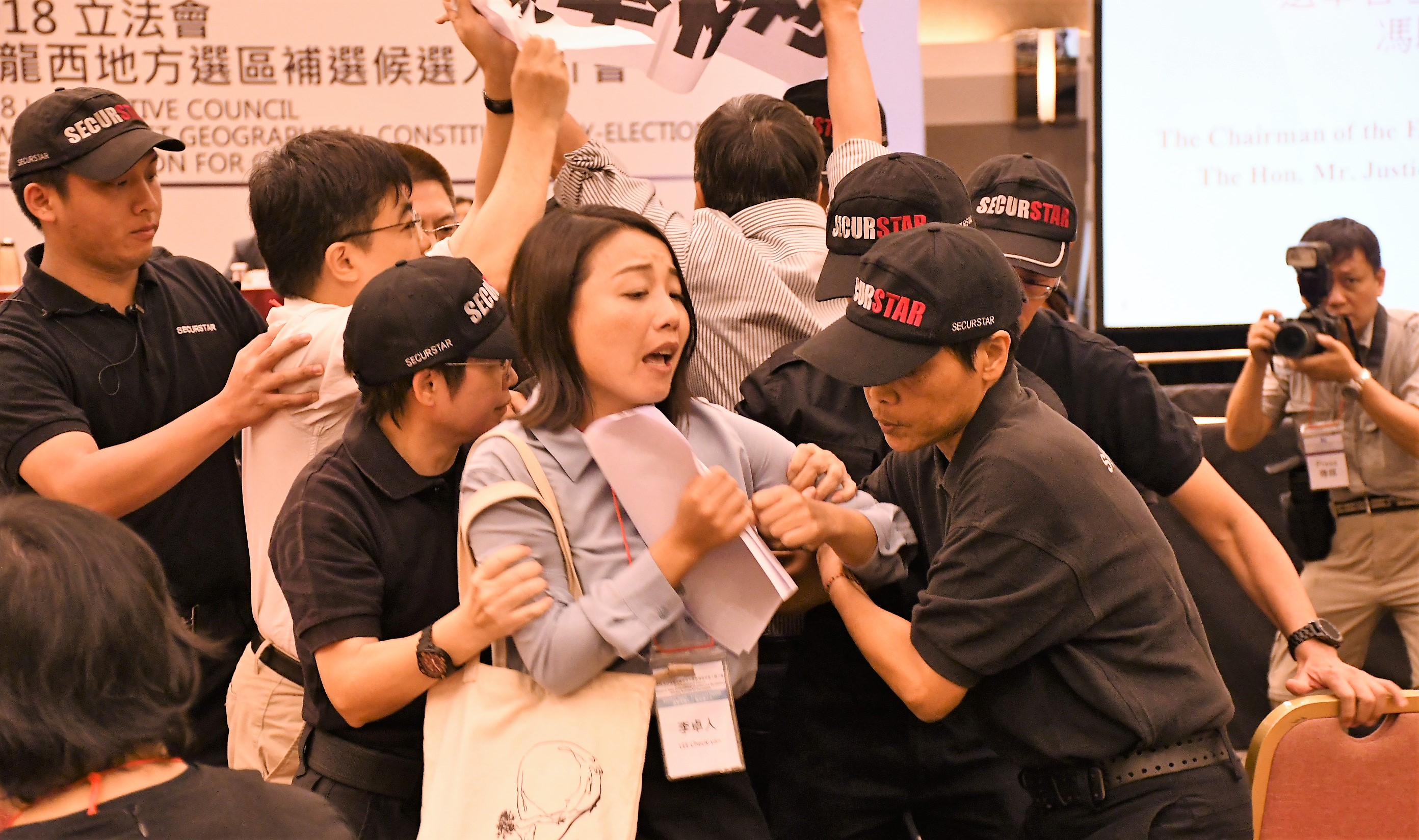
Lau Siu-lai protested against the Returning Officer's decision to invalidate her candidacy at the poll briefing.

- Lau Siu-lai, ousted legislator in the oath-taking controversy joined the Labour Party ahead of the election and has announced her candidacy as the joint candidate of the camp. Her candidacy was invalidated on 12 October by Returning Officer Franco Kwok Wai-fun on the basis of Lau previous advocacy of Hong Kong's self-determination, which showed she had no intention of upholding the Basic Law and pledging allegiance to Hong Kong as a special administrative region of China.
- James Chan Kwok-keung, a disqualified candidate in the 2016 Legislative Council election and 2018 New Territories East by-election for his perceived pro-independence stance failed to pay his deposit for the candidacy and his candidacy was therefore invalidated.

== Campaign ==
In August, Chan Hoi-yan, a former news anchor and political assistant to Secretary for Food and Health Ko Wing-man emerged as a potential candidate for the pro-Beijing camp after Ko announced he would not run in the by-election. In late August, a 25-metre billboard of Chan Hoi-yan as a "health ambassador" outside Cross-Harbour Tunnel in Hung Hom funded by pro-Beijing Kowloon Federation of Associations (KFA) with an estimated cost of more than HK$248,000 sparked controversy the election rules dictate that candidates are only allowed to spend a maximum of HK$1.82 million on expenses while Chan had not yet declared herself as a candidate.

Frederick Fung, a veteran pro-democracy legislator announced his candidacy after long speculations that he would run, and cited that he was unhappy the camp had decided on another veteran, Lee Cheuk-yan, as Lau's backup, in case of disqualification of the candidacy of Lau Siu-lai, one of the six ousted pro-democracy legislator in the 2016 oath-taking controversy who was commonly backed by the pro-democracy camp. Fung previously lost in the pro-democracy primary in the March by-election to Yiu Chung-yim and subsequently quit the Association for Democracy and People's Livelihood (ADPL), in what was seen as a move for him to run as an independent in the by-election. Fung said he ran because he opposed the pro-democrats for monopolising the candidacy selection process. Political observer Dr Chung Kim-wah said Fung's decision had caused uncertainty for the pro-democrat campaign would easily attract thousands of votes from the pro-democracy voter base that would cost pro-democrats the election.

On 12 October, Lau Siu-lai's candidacy was invalidated by Returning Officer Franco Kwok Wai-fun as he claimed that Lau did not accept China's sovereignty over Hong Kong. He cited her declaration in July 2016, made jointly with political party Demosisto and Eddie Chu, calling for "democratic self-determination" while keeping open the option for independence. He said Lau had been "consistently holding the same political stance" and "had not taken any step to dissociate herself from such political stance until very recently". Lau accused Kwok's decision as "unreasonable" and her political views from 2016 were "completely twisted". Foreseeing the disqualification, Labour Party veteran Lee Cheuk-yan signed up for the race as a "plan B".

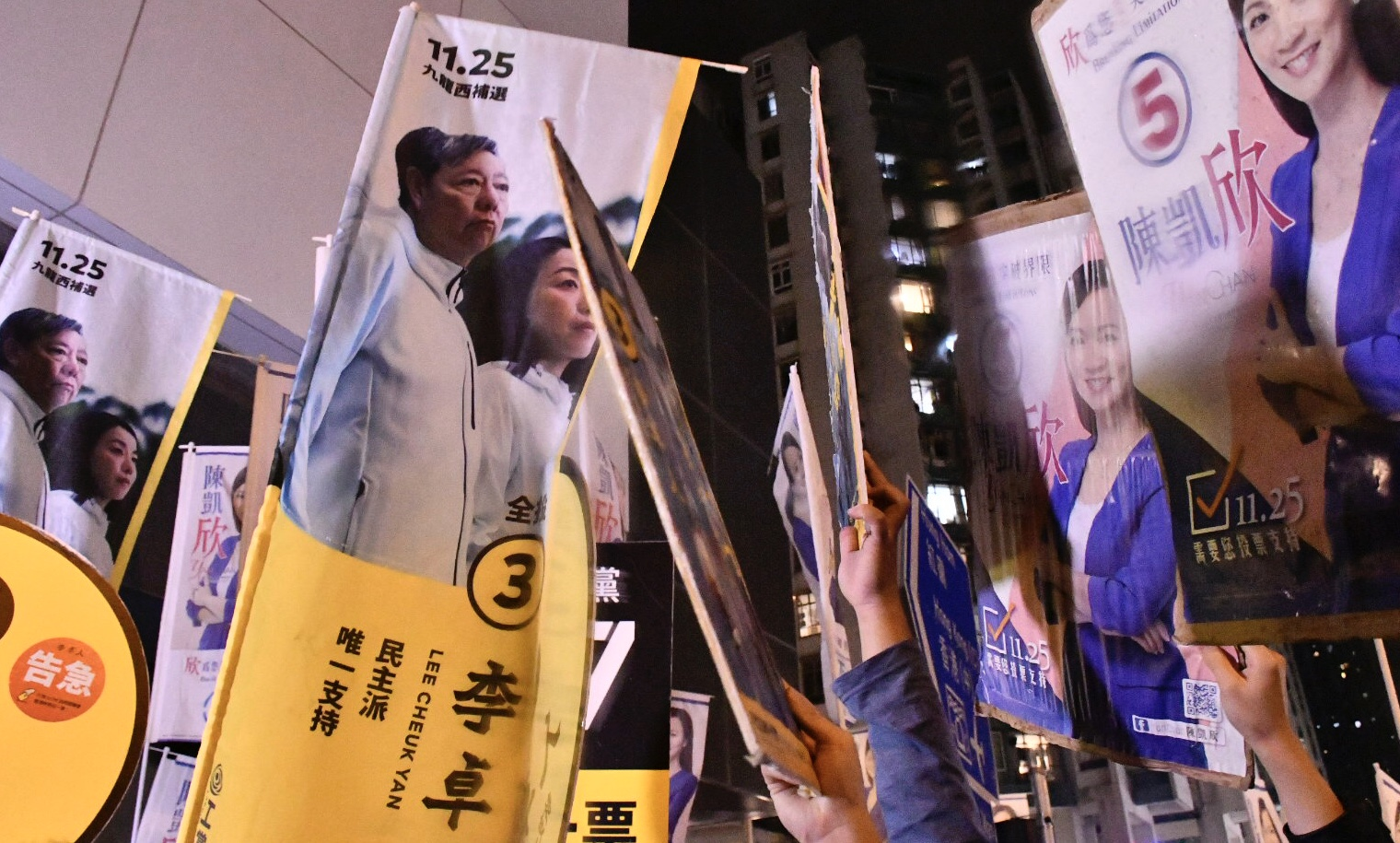
Election banners of Lee Cheuk-yan and Chan Hoi-yan were seen on the election day.

Lee's platform focuses on four themes: fighting for democracy, better living, a stronger civil society and resisting the "mainlandisation" of Hong Kong, while Chan said she intended to put citizens' welfare above politics. She admitted to being a member of the pro-Beijing camp only after she denied it even though her campaign rally attended by leaders from the camp. Chan also relied on the high popularity of former Secretary for Food and Health Ko Wing-man to sway swing votes, while Lee, learning from the defeat in March, struck a better balance between online and on-the-ground campaigns as the March pro-democracy candidate Yiu Chung-yim was criticised for focusing too much on online campaigns. He also highlighted his crucial goal of preventing a pro-Beijing dominance in the geographical constituencies, which meant the pro-democracy would lose the veto power against pro-Beijing attempts of changing the Rules of Procedure of the Legislative Council if they gained one more seats over the pro-democrats.

Fung focused on attacking the pro-democrats for its "undemocratic" mechanism of selecting the candidates for this election, claiming that it was the reason for him to eat his promise of not running again after he lost the March primary. He received a lot of attacks from the pro-democracy figures who rejected him for being a pro-democrat and accused him for being a "vote splitting tool" for Beijing. Fung reiterated by filing complaints to Independent Commission Against Corruption (ICAC) against pro-democracy media for some of their accusations.

== Polling ==
Date(s) conducted	Polling organisation/client	Sample size	Chan	Fung	Lee	Ng	Tzeng	None of above/ Undecided	Lead
6–21 Nov	Hong Kong Research Association	~1,000	26%	11%	24%	3%	5%	28%	2%
1–19 Nov	HKU POP/Apple Daily	~500	25%	11%	31%	1%	0%	32%	6%

== Result ==
Kowloon West result by District Council constituency.

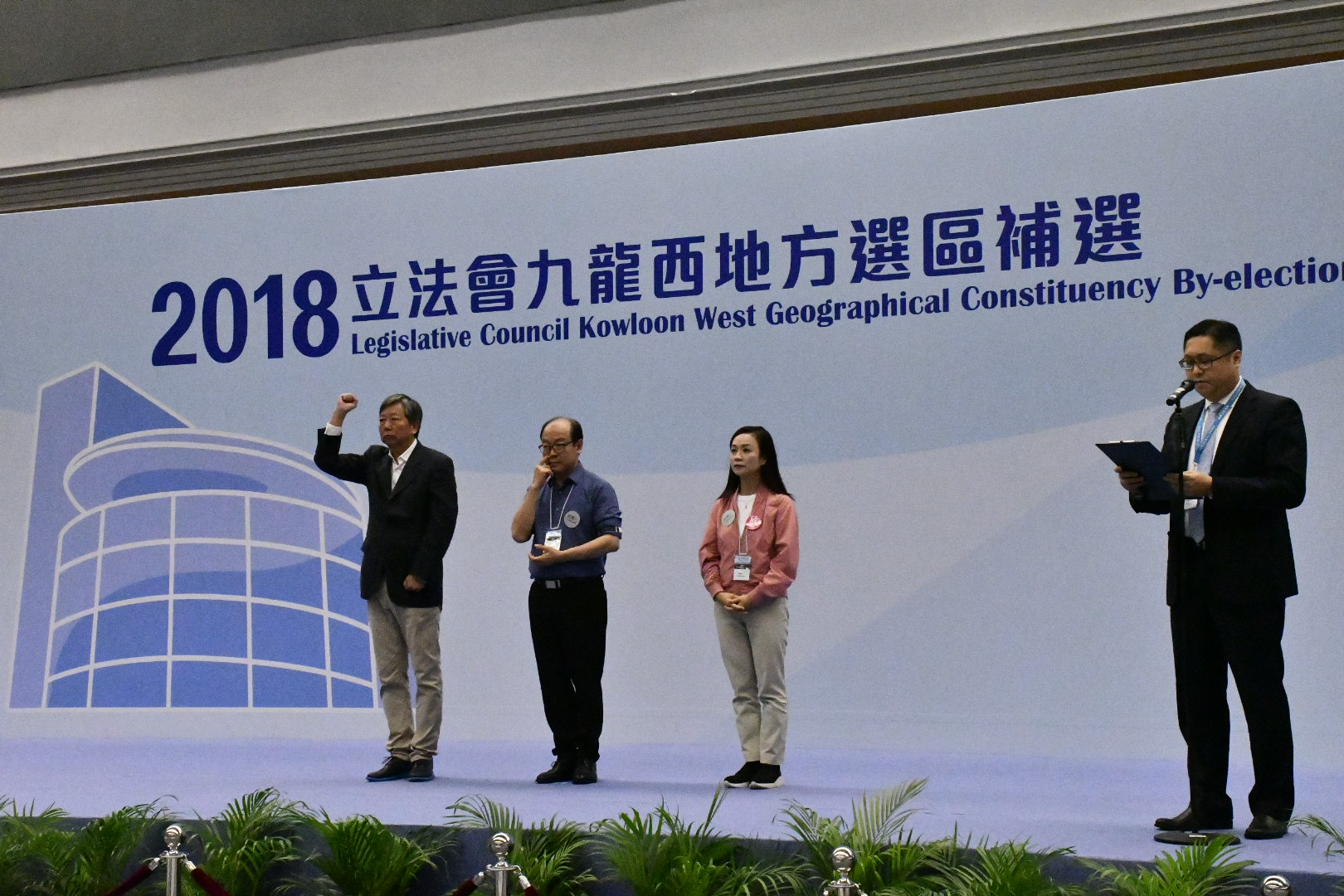
Candidates awaited as electoral results were announced by the Returning Officer.

Kowloon West
Party	Candidate	Votes	%	±%
Nonpartisan	Chan Hoi-yan	106,457	49.52	
Labour	Lee Cheuk-yan	93,047	43.28	
Nonpartisan	Frederick Fung Kin-kee	12,509	5.82	
Nonpartisan	Ng Dick-hay	1,650	0.77	
Nonpartisan	Judy Tzeng Li-wen	1,307	0.61	
Majority		13,410	6.24	
Total valid votes		214,970	100.00	
Rejected ballots		1,552		
Turnout		216,522	44.45	
Registered electors		487,160		
Nonpartisan gain from Nonpartisan		Swing		

Popular vote
Chan	49.52%
Lee	43.28%
Fung	5.82%
Ng	0.77%
Tzeng	0.61%

== Overturn ==
Based on the former cases of the returning officers' decision on disqualifying Agnes Chow and Ventus Lau in the March 2018 by-elections, Justice Anderson Chow on 21 May for the third time overturned the returning officer's disqualification decision regarding Lau Siu-lai, on the basis of which the returning officer's failed or refused to give Lau a proper opportunity to respond to allegations against her. The court also declared that Chan Hoi-yan was "unduly elected" and therefore was to lose her seat.

== See also ==
- 2018 Hong Kong by-election
- List of Hong Kong by-elections
