= Lau Siu-lai =

Hong Kong politician (born 1976)

- 劉小麗
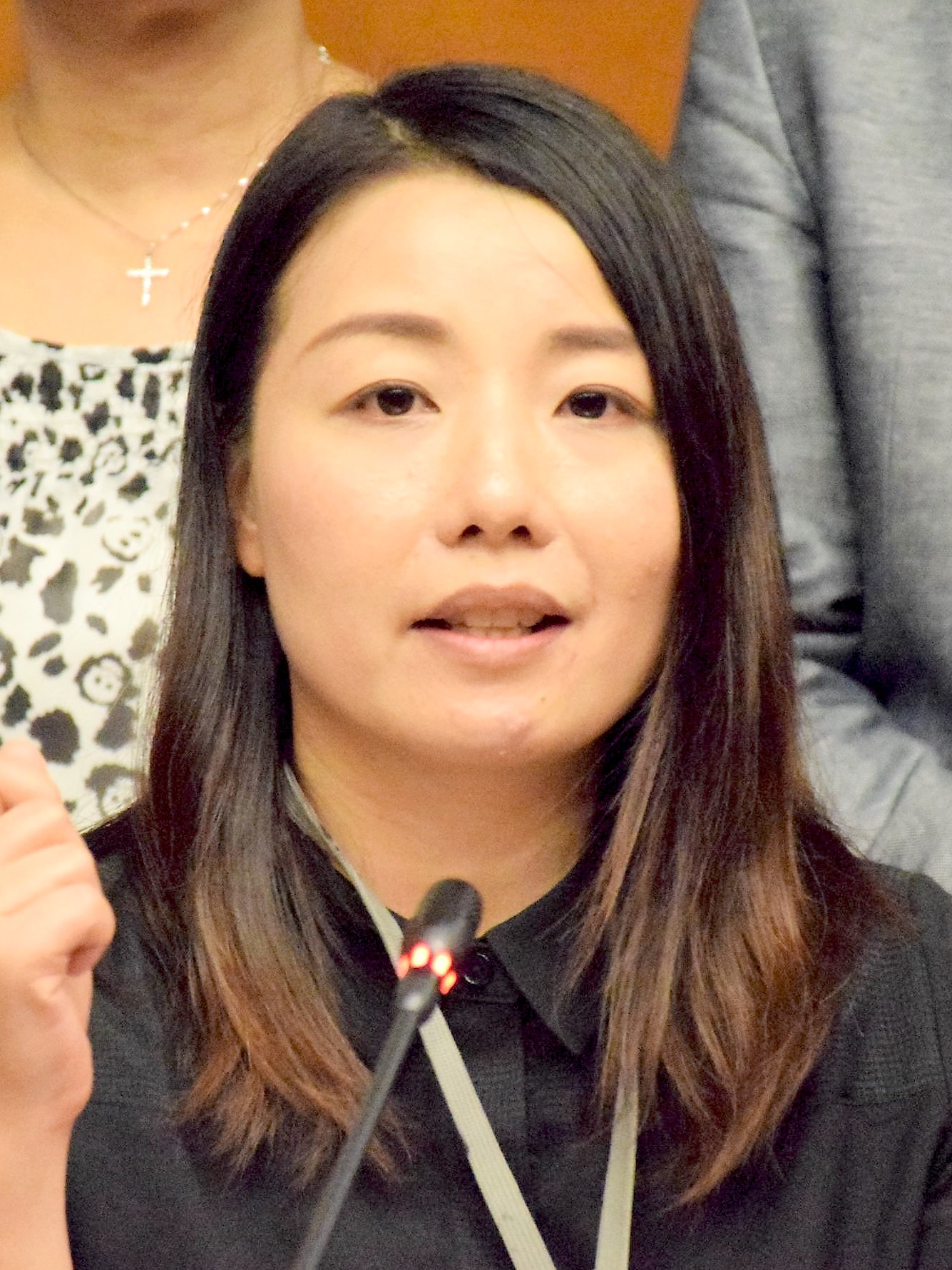

Member of the Legislative Council
- In office 1 October 2016 – 14 July 2017 (Note: Lau served as member of the Legislative Council until 14 July 2017 when her oath on 12 October 2016 was invalidated and her seat was vacated according to the ruling of the Court of First Instance.)
- Preceded by: Wong Yuk-man
- Succeeded by: Chan Hoi-yan
- Constituency: Kowloon West

Personal details
- Born: Lau Siu-lai; 3 August 1976 (age 50) British Hong Kong
- Party: Labour Party (2018-2020)
- Other political affiliations: Democracy Groundwork
- Education: Chinese University of Hong Kong (B.Soc.Sc. in Sociology; M.Phil. in Sociology; PhD in Sociology)
- Occupation: Lecturer
- Website: Official website of Democratic Groundwork

Lau Siu-lai
- Traditional Chinese: 劉小麗
- Simplified Chinese: 刘小丽
Transcriptions
Standard Mandarin
- Hanyu Pinyin: Liú Xiǎolì
Yue: Cantonese
- Yale Romanization: Làuh Síu-laih
- Jyutping: Lau^{4} Siu^{2}-lai^{6}

Lau Siu-lai (Chinese: 劉小麗; born 3 August 1976) is a Hong Kong educator, academic, activist, and politician. She is a sociology lecturer at the Hong Kong Polytechnic University's Hong Kong Community College and the founder of Democracy Groundwork and Age of Resistance. In 2016, Lau was elected to the Legislative Council, representing the Kowloon West geographical constituency until she was disqualified by the court on 14 July 2017 over her oath-taking manner at the inaugural meeting of the Legislative Council on 12 October 2016.

== Background ==
Lau holds a bachelor's degree in social science, a master of philosophy in sociology, and a PhD in cultural sociology and historical sociology from the Chinese University of Hong Kong. She worked as a tutor at the Chinese University for a decade before joining the faculty of the Hong Kong Community College. Lau taught a variety of sociology classes including Introduction to Sociology, Sociological Theories, Hong Kong Society, Medical Society, Social Problems, and Gender Issues.

She gained prominence establishing Democracy Groundwork to hold "Democracy Classrooms" during the 2014 pro-democratic protests, teaching protesters about social justice and democracy. In this role she earned the moniker "Teacher Siu-lai" (Chinese: 小麗老師).

Lau has challenged the Hong Kong government's suppression of hawking, and the crackdown on the traditional Kweilin Street Night Market, on the grounds that government policies toward street trading serves to bolster the hegemony of Hong Kong's dominant property conglomerates while unjustly persecuting the poor. Lau has hawked food herself, as an act of civil disobedience, in support of hawkers. She has organised street markets in Mei Foo, Sham Shui Po and Wong Tai Sin to demonstrate that hawking can be conducted in an orderly manner. She urges the government to once again issue hawker licences, and to allow street markets throughout the territory to provide more choice to consumers.

Until 2016, authorities had turned a blind eye to the Lunar New Year market on Kweilin Street, considered a staple of Hong Kong culture. On 7 February 2016, the eve of the Lunar New Year, the Food and Environmental Hygiene Department (FEHD) officers took a hardline stance against the market, chasing away the vendors. Lau set up a stall in the street and sold squid in defiance, and was arrested. In response to the crackdown, localist group Hong Kong Indigenous called on supporters to come out on 8 February to help "protect" the hawkers and the night markets. The FEHD and police again took action against the markets, resulting in a major civil disturbance.

In response to her arrest, Lau said the government's stance was unreasonable, as hawking provides jobs, lowers the cost of living, and gives residents choice in the face of neighbourhoods dominated by corporate powers. Lau appeared at Kowloon City Magistrates' Court on 20 June 2016. Two officers from the FEHD testified that they saw Lau heat up squid with a frying pan and sell a man a skewer for HK$10. She was convicted on three counts, namely: obstruction of a public space, hawking without a licence, and cooking food for the purpose of hawking without a licence. She was fined HK$1,800 and her hawking gear was seized under the Public Health and Municipal Services Ordinance. Lau stated that she would continue to hawk and would continue to support hawkers.

Lau's educational career is under jeopardy due to her hawking-related activism. In mid-2016 the Hong Kong Polytechnic University launched a disciplinary hearing against her for "moonlighting" as she reportedly earned HK$10 selling snacks. Lau said that the university's actions were politically motivated, stating that senior figures at the institute had told her that the president was under pressure from the university's governing council to take action against her. Lau donated the $10 to her Democracy Groundwork and defended herself, stating that there was no conflict of interest, that hawking does not constitute formal employment, and that the ban on moonlighting applied only to full-time faculty (while she was a part-time lecturer at the time).

== Political career ==
=== 2016 election and platform ===
Running under the banner of Democracy Groundwork, Lau was elected to the Legislative Council in the 2016 election, representing the geographical constituency of Kowloon West. During her election campaign, Lau stated that if elected her top priorities would be to "push back on 'white elephant' infrastructure projects, implement a universal pension scheme, legislate standard working hours, reform housing policy, and restart electoral reform."

Lau calls for the reform of Hong Kong's political system. She believes it is ineffective to fight against Leung Chun-ying on the grounds that, "You kick away Leung and Beijing will give you another one as bad as him, if not worse. We need to reform the system." She has rejected the idea of Hong Kong independence as "unrealistic", but says the issue should be open for discussion. She advocates a "very high" degree of autonomy for Hong Kong and the protection of local culture.

In addition to her above views on hawkers, Lau is critical of Link REIT, a private real estate company whose assets primarily comprise shopping centres, markets, and car parks in public housing estates. Link REIT exercises a de facto monopoly in many low-income areas, and has been subject to numerous protests due to rapid rent increases, eviction of local shops in favour of chain operators, and property management outsourcing. There have been calls for the government to buy back properties owned by the Link REIT, most of which were divested from the Housing Authority in 2005. Lau said that allowing more hawking and street markets would provide more choice and spur competition.

The election was held on 4 September 2016, with a total of 36 candidates standing on 15 party lists in the Kowloon West constituency. Standing alone on her list, Lau garnered 38,183 votes, the third highest at 13.69 percent of the total, and the best supported pro-democracy candidate. She is regarded as a member of the localist camp, and pledged to work together with other newly elected localists Eddie Chu and Nathan Law.

=== Swearing-in and disqualification as legislator ===
At the Legislative Council swearing-in on 12 October 2016 Lau first read an altered version of the oath of office in protest. She was asked to read it again, and she did so extremely slowly. Other pro-democratic and localist candidates similarly added extra phrases of protest to their oaths. LegCo president Andrew Leung Kwan-yuen rejected the oath and sent Lau a notice that read: "The conduct of Ms Lau's oath-taking, objectively assessed, has shown that she was not serious about the affirmation and had no intention to be bound by it." Leung asked Lau, Baggio Leung, Yau Wai-ching, and Edward Yiu, who had all protested during their swearing-in, to retake their oaths.

The government challenged Leung's decision with regard to Yau and Baggio Leung, in an unprecedented action whereby the government sought to disqualify two democratically elected legislators. Lau, despite protesting in a similar manner to Yau Wai-ching and Baggio Leung, did not appear to be targeted by the court order. Lau was finally sworn in on 2 November 2016 by Andrew Leung, despite the protests of pro-Beijing camp. The judge presiding over Yau and Leung's case ruled in favour of the government on 15 November 2016, disqualifying the duo and barring them from the legislature.

Jackson Kwan San-wai, who ran at the head of the Politihk Social Strategic list in the same constituency as Lau but lost, with his list (of two) gaining only 938 votes (0.34%), filed an election petition against Lau in November 2016 on the grounds that by her conduct during the swearing-in she did not uphold the Basic Law. Politihk Social Strategic is a group of pro-Beijing activists who opposed the 2014 pro-democratic protests. It was followed by the government launching a second legal action, against her and three other legislators, Leung Kwok-hung of the League of Social Democrats (LSD), Nathan Law of Demosisto and Yiu Chung-yim, on 2 December. The four members were eventually disqualified by the court on 14 July 2017.

Lau and Leung pursued a legal appeal against their disqualification, meaning that of the six seats left vacant by the removal of pro-democracy Legislative Councillors, only the other four were contested in the by-election of 11 March 2018. However, on 29 May 2018, Lau announced that she was retracting her appeal, given uncertainty from the court about whether it could be heard with Leung's, as well as the cost and high psychological pressure of the case, and the delay it would cause to the opportunity for the democratic camp to regain the seat in a by-election.

=== Kowloon West by-election 2018 and disqualification ===
On 29 June 2018, Lau joined the Labour Party, and brought her Democracy Groundwork group on board the party also. She publicly discussed the possibility of running to regain her old seat, either with the Labour Party or independently.

Also in June, it was announced that the by-election for Lau's seat, the geographical constituency of Kowloon West, would take place on 25 November 2018. On 20 September, Lau became the first person to announce her candidacy in a bid to regain the seat. She was the candidate of the pro-democracy camp. On 12 October 2018, Lau was disqualified by the Electoral Affairs Commission. She was replaced by Lee Cheuk-yan, who was defeated by health ambassador and pro-Beijing Chan Hoi-yan on 25 November, causing the pro-democracy camp to lose its majority status in the geographical constituency part in the Legislative Council.

== Notes ==
Legislative Council of Hong Kong
Preceded by Wong Yuk-man	Member of Legislative Council; Representative for Kowloon West; 2016–2017	Succeeded by Chan Hoi-yan
