= Chan Hoi-yan =

Hong Kong politician

The Honourable Chan Hoi-yan
- 陳凱欣
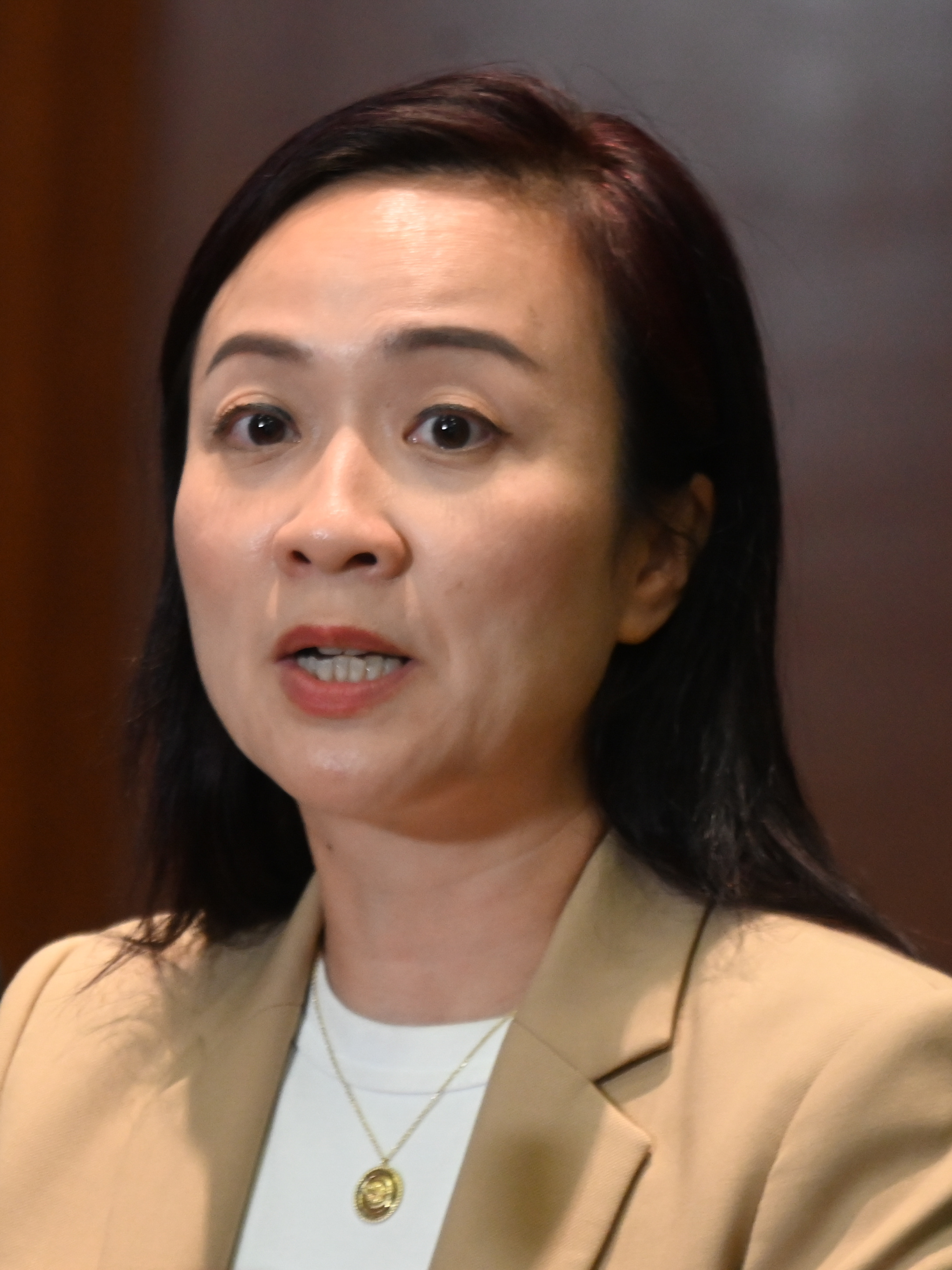
- Chan in 2023

Member of the Legislative Council
- Incumbent
- Assumed office 1 January 2022
- Preceded by: New constituency
- Constituency: Election Committee
- In office 26 November 2018 – 18 September 2020
- Preceded by: Lau Siu-lai
- Succeeded by: Constituency abolished
- Constituency: Kowloon West

Political Assistant to Secretary for Food and Health
- In office 1 December 2012 – 1 July 2017
- Secretary: Ko Wing-man
- Preceded by: Paul Chan
- Succeeded by: Kelvin Cheng

Personal details
- Born: 19 November 1977 (age 48) Hong Kong
- Party: No Party Connection
- Spouse: Ivan Yau Man-wah
- Children: Jason Yau; Ivana Yau
- Education: Hong Kong Baptist University (BSS)
- Occupation: Journalist, medical professional, politician and vocalist

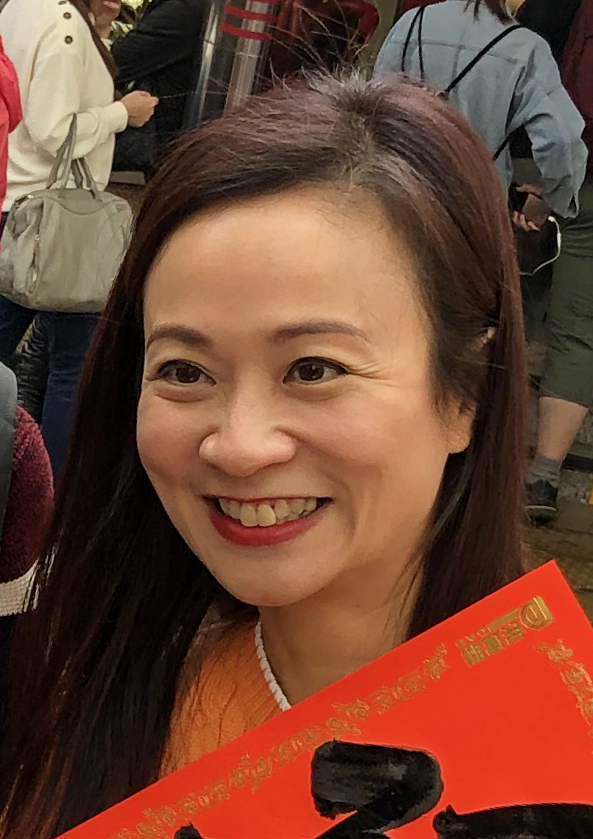
Chan in 2019

Rebecca Chan Hoi-yan (Chinese: 陳凱欣; born 19 November 1977) is a member of the Legislative Council of Hong Kong. She is a former journalist. Chan was the political assistant to Secretary for Food and Health Ko Wing-man from 2012 to 2017. As a health ambassador, she joined in the 2018 November Kowloon West by-election and was elected, defeating pro-democrat candidate Lee Cheuk-yan. Chan is also a musician and vocalist.

== Early career ==
Chan graduated from the Department of Journalism at Hong Kong Baptist University and obtained a Master of Social Sciences Degree in Media Management also from Baptist University. She received the university's Distinguished Alumni Communicator Award in 2008.

She joined TVB as a news reporter in 1998 and became a senior reporter and anchor later. In 2005, she joined Now TV as a news editor (news and business information) and assisted in setting up the now business news channel and the news channel. She was also an executive producer of the medical programme Medicine Online.

From December 2012 until the end of his tenure on 30 June 2017, she was the political assistant to Secretary for Food and Health Ko Wing-man. She became CEO of social enterprise Sounds Great Services after she left the government.

== 2018 Legislative Council by-election ==
She decided to be a candidate in the 2018 November Kowloon West by-election after Ko declined to run and endorsed Chan in his place. Relatively unknown to the public before, she benefitted from the popularity of her former boss Ko and the resources of the pro-Beijing camp, although she denied to be a pro-Beijing candidate until in the late stage of the campaign. As a result, she earned 106,457 votes, 13,410 more than veteran pro-democrat candidate Lee Cheuk-yan of the Labour Party, being the second candidate to beat a pro-democrat candidate in a geographical constituency direct election after Vincent Cheng of the Democratic Alliance for the Betterment and Progress of Hong Kong (DAB) beat Edward Yiu in the March by-election in the same constituency.

In the campaign of the election, one of her campaign leaflets was found to contain material plagiarised from work by Kenny Lai Kwong Wai, a Democratic Party Kowloon City District Councillor, urging a review of tourism laws. She apologised for the inclusion, with her office claiming it was a production error. Other pro-Beijing district councillors also used the plagiarised material, including Chan's DAB colleague Luk King-kwong and Lam Pok of Kowloon West New Dynamic.

She was unseated as her election result was voided by court in September 2020 due to irregularities, on the petition of Lau Siu-lai.

== Legislative Council member ==
In December 2021, Chan was elected as Legislative Councilor through election committee constituency.

In September 2022, Chan said that the government should be conservative with relaxing COVID-19 measures and should not reduce current anti-epidemic measures despite a drop in cases. Chan expressed support for continuing overnight lockdowns and mandatory testing requirements. In contrast, top Hong Kong microbiologist, Ho Pak-leung said that the government should stop mandatory testing requirements at residences.

In December 2025, Chan was re-elected as Legislative Councilor.

== Notes ==
Political offices
Preceded by Paul Chan	Political Assistant to Secretary for Food and Health; 2012–2017	Succeeded by Kelvin Cheng
Assembly seats
Preceded by Lau Siu-lai	Member of Legislative Council; Representative for Kowloon West; 2018–2020	Constituency abolished
New constituency	Member of Legislative Council; Representative for Election Committee; 2022–present	Incumbent
