= Hong Kong Localism Power (2015) =

Hong Kong Localism Power 香港本土力量
- Chairman: Jonathan Ho
- Vice-Chairman: Edward Yum
- Founded: 14 March 2015

Hong Kong Localism Power (Chinese: 香港本土力量) is a conservative localist political organisation founded in 2015. It is currently headed by Jonathan Ho Chi-kwong.

In the 2016 Hong Kong Legislative Council election, Ho formed a joint ticket with Democratic Progressive Party of Hong Kong chairman Yeung Ke-cheong. Yeung's candidacy was disqualified by the Electoral Affairs Commission as he did not sign both the original and additional confirmation forms to pledge to uphold the Hong Kong Basic Law. Ho led a ticket on his own and ran a negative propaganda against Wong Yuk-man which led to the downfall of Wong, who failed to retain his seat by a margin of 424 votes. Ho himself received 399 votes.

In November 2018 Kowloon West by-election, Ho supported pro-Beijing Chan Hoi-yan.

== Performance in elections ==
=== Legislative Council elections ===
Election	Number of popular votes	% of popular votes	GC seats	FC seats	Total seats	+/−	Position
2016	399	0.02	0	0	0 / 70	0	Steady
