= Kowloon West (1998 constituency) =

Former Hong Kong constituency

- Former Geographical constituency for the Legislative Council of Hong Kong
- Boundary of Kowloon West in Hong Kong
- District: Yau Tsim Mong District; Sham Shui Po District; Kowloon City District
- Region: Kowloon
- Population: 1,205,300 (2020)
- Electorate: 602,733 (2020)

Former constituency
- Created: 1998
- Abolished: 2021
- Number of members: Three (1998–2000); Four (2000–2008); Five (2008–2016); Six (2016–2021)
- Created from: Kowloon South-west, Kowloon West (1995), Kowloon South, Kowloon Central (1995)
- Replaced by: Kowloon Central (2021), Kowloon West (2021)

The Kowloon West geographical constituency was one of the five geographical constituencies of the Legislative Council of Hong Kong from 1998 to 2021. It was established in 1998 for the first SAR Legislative Council election and was abolished under the 2021 overhaul of the Hong Kong electoral system. In the 2016 Legislative Council election, it elected six members of the Legislative Council using the Hare quota of party-list proportional representation. It had 602,733 registered electorates in 2020. The constituency corresponded to the districts of Yau Tsim Mong, Sham Shui Po, and Kowloon City.

== History ==
The single-constituency single-vote system was replaced by the party-list proportional representation system for the first SAR Legislative Council election designed by Beijing to reward the weaker pro-Beijing candidates and dilute the electoral strength of the majority pro-democrats. Three seats were allocated to Kowloon consisting the districts of Yau Tsim Mong, Sham Shui Po and Kowloon City in 1998. The Democratic Party won more than 55 per cent of the vote with Lau Chin-shek and James To elected. The remaining seat was won by pro-Beijing Democratic Alliance for the Betterment of Hong Kong (DAB) chairman Jasper Tsang. Frederick Fung of the Hong Kong Association for Democracy and People's Livelihood (ADPL) however was defeated over his decision to join the Beijing-controlled Provisional Legislative Council in 1996.

In the 2000 Legislative Council election, an extra seat was added to the constituency which was taken by Frederick Fung. In the 2004 election, Lau Chin-shek who quit the Democratic Party ran as a nonpartisan, while Jasper Tsang's DAB ticket rose to the top with more than 27 per cent. The seats of the Kowloon West was increased to five seats due to the reapportionment, which attracted Civic Party and the Liberal Party among others contesting for the new seat. As Lau Chin-shek ran a low-profile campaign, Wong Yuk-man of the League of Social Democrats (LSD) and pro-Beijing independent Priscilla Leung emerged victorious, while Starry Lee succeeding Jasper Tsang instead who ran in Hong Kong Island.

In 2010, the LSD launched the "Five Constituencies Referendum" with the Civic Party to pressure the government on the 2012 constitutional reform package. Wong Yuk-man resigned in Kowloon West to trigger a by-election in which he was re-elected with a low turnout due to the government and pro-Beijing boycott. In the 2012 Legislative Council election, James To and Frederick Fung switched to the newly created District Council (Second) "super seat", while Helena Wong successfully succeeding To, Tam Kwok-kiu failed to gain a seat for the ADPL and was replaced by Claudia Mo of the Civic Party.

The rise of the localist camp in the 2016 Legislative Council election was reflected in Kowloon West, where university lecturer Lau Siu-lai and activist Yau Wai-ching each gained a seat when the constituency was added an extra seat due to the reapportionment. In return, Wong Yuk-man who now represented the Proletariat Political Institute (PPI) was ousted unexpectedly by Yau Wai-ching with a narrow margin of 424 votes, 0.15 per cent of the vote share. The pro-Beijing camp took a conservative strategy by fielding only two tickets led by Ann Chiang of the DAB and Priscilla Leung of the Business and Professionals Alliance for Hong Kong (BPA), making it the constituency electing all women.

Yau was soon disqualified from the office due to her oath-taking controversy, followed by Lau Siu-lai who was also disqualified for her oath-taking manner. Two by-elections were held in March and November 2018 where pro-Beijing candidates Vincent Cheng of the DAB and independent Chan Hoi-yan surprisingly both beat the pro-democracy candidates, first times pro-Beijing camp won a majority in a direct election in more than 20 years. Chan, however, was unseated in 2020, as the court viewed Lau Siu-lai's disqualification from running in the November 2018 by-election was unlawful.

== Returned members ==
Below are all the members since the creation of the Kowloon West constituency. The number of seats allocated to Kowloon West was increased from three to six between 1998 and 2016 due to its enlargement. Councillors representing this area include:

LegCo members for Kowloon West, 1998–2021
Term	Election	Member	Member	Member	Member	Member	Member
1st	1998	Lau Chin-shek (DP/CTU→CTU)	James To (DP)	Tsang Yok-sing (DAB)			
2nd	2000	Lau Chin-shek (DP/CTU→CTU)	James To (DP)	Tsang Yok-sing (DAB)	Frederick Fung (ADPL)		
3rd	2004	Lau Chin-shek (DP/CTU→CTU)	James To (DP)	Tsang Yok-sing (DAB)	Frederick Fung (ADPL)		
4th	2008	Wong Yuk-man (LSD)	James To (DP)	Starry Lee (DAB)	Frederick Fung (ADPL)	Priscilla Leung (Ind→BPA/KWND)	
4th	2008	Vacant	James To (DP)	Starry Lee (DAB)	Frederick Fung (ADPL)	Priscilla Leung (Ind→BPA/KWND)	
4th	2010 (b)	Wong Yuk-man (LSD→PP→Ind)	James To (DP)	Starry Lee (DAB)	Frederick Fung (ADPL)	Priscilla Leung (Ind→BPA/KWND)	
5th	2012	Wong Yuk-man (LSD→PP→Ind)	Helena Wong (DP)	Ann Chiang (DAB)	Claudia Mo (CP→HKF)	Priscilla Leung (Ind→BPA/KWND)	
6th	2016	Yau Wai-ching (Youngspiration)	Helena Wong (DP)	Ann Chiang (DAB)	Claudia Mo (CP→HKF)	Priscilla Leung (Ind→BPA/KWND)	Lau Siu-lai (DG)
6th	Mar 2018 (b)	Vincent Cheng (DAB)	Helena Wong (DP)	Ann Chiang (DAB)	Claudia Mo (CP→HKF)	Priscilla Leung (Ind→BPA/KWND)	Vacant
6th	Nov 2018 (b)	Vincent Cheng (DAB)	Helena Wong (DP)	Ann Chiang (DAB)	Claudia Mo (CP→HKF)	Priscilla Leung (Ind→BPA/KWND)	Chan Hoi-yan (Ind)
6th	Nov 2018 (b)	Vincent Cheng (DAB)	Helena Wong (DP)	Ann Chiang (DAB)	Claudia Mo (CP→HKF)	Priscilla Leung (Ind→BPA/KWND)	Vacant
6th	Nov 2018 (b)	Vincent Cheng (DAB)	Vacant	Ann Chiang (DAB)	Vacant	Priscilla Leung (Ind→BPA/KWND)	Vacant

=== Summary of seats won ===
Term	Election	Distribution
1st	1998	2 / 1
2nd	2000	3 / 1
3rd	2004	3 / 1
4th	2008	3 / 2
5th	2012	3 / 2
6th	2016	4 / 2

	1998	2000	2004	2008	2012	2016
Democratic	2	1	1	1	1	1
DAB	1	1	1	1	1	1
CTU		1				
ADPL		1	1	1		
LSD				1		
People Power					1	
Civic					1	1
KWND/BPA					1	1
Democracy Groundwork						1
Youngspiration						1
Independent			1	1		
Pro-democracy	2	3	3	3	3	4
Pro-Beijing	1	1	1	2	2	2
Seats	3	4	4	5	5	6

=== Vote share summary ===
	1998	2000	2004	2008	2012	2016
Democratic	55.1	20.7	26.6	14.4	15.5	9.3
DAB	21.7	23.5	27.1	18.9	20.4	18.8
ADPL	19.3	35.2	26.4	17.2	13.2	5.5
Liberal	2.9			6.3		
CTU		20.7				
LSD				18.2		2.4
Civic				8.4	16.3	11.6
People Power					16.7	
KWND/BPA					14.9	17.8
Democracy Groundwork						13.7
Youngspiration						7.4
PPI						7.3
Third Side						4.8
Independent and Others	1.1		19.9	16.7	3.0	1.1
Pro-democracy	74.3	76.5	72.1	64.4	63.1	58.2
Pro-Beijing	24.6	23.5	27.1	35.3	36.9	37.0

== Election results ==
The largest remainder method (with Hare quota) of the proportional representative electoral system was introduced in 1998, replacing the single-member constituencies of the 1995 election. Elected candidates are shown in bold. Brackets indicate the quota + remainder.

=== 2010s ===
November 2018 Kowloon West by-election
Party	Candidate	Votes	%	±%
**Nonpartisan**	**Chan Hoi-yan**	**106,457**	**49.52**	
Labour	Lee Cheuk-yan	93,047	43.28	
Nonpartisan	Frederick Fung Kin-kee	12,509	5.82	
Nonpartisan	Ng Dick-hay	1,650	0.77	
Nonpartisan	Judy Tzeng Li-wen	1,307	0.61	
Majority		13,410	6.24	
Total valid votes		214,970	100.00	
Rejected ballots		1,552		
Turnout		216,522	44.45	
Registered electors		487,160		
Nonpartisan **gain** from Nonpartisan		Swing		

March 2018 Kowloon West by-election
Party	Candidate	Votes	%	±%
**DAB**	**Vincent Cheng Wing-shun**	**107,479**	**49.91**	
Nonpartisan	Yiu Chung-yim	105,060	48.79	
Nonpartisan	Jonathan Tsoi Tung-chau	2,794	1.30	
Majority		2,419	1.12	
Total valid votes		215,333	100.00	
Rejected ballots		1,562		
Turnout		216,895	44.31	
Registered electors		489,451		
DAB **gain** from Youngspiration		Swing		

↓
**1**	**1**	**1**	**1**	**1**	**1**

Vote share
1. DAB (18.8%)
2. BPA (17.8%)
3. DG (13.7%)
4. Civic (11.6%)
5. Democratic (9.34%)
6. Youngspiration (7.40%)
7. PPI (7.25%)
8. ADPL (5.52%)
9. Third Side (4.83%)
10. LSD (2.44%)
11. Politihk SS (0.34%)
12. PVP (0.24%)
13. HKLP (0.14%)
14. Other (0.54%)

2016 Legislative Council election: Kowloon West
List	Candidates	Votes	Of total (%)	± from prev.
**Quota**		46,479	16.67	
DAB	**Ann Chiang Lai-wan** Chris Ip Ngo-tung, Samuel Chan Wai-ming, Terence Siu Tin-hung, Allen Cheung Tak-wai	52,541	18.84 (16.67+2.17)	–1.57
BPA (KWND)	**Leung Mei-fun** Leung Man-kwong, Cho Wui-hung, Kacee Ting Wong, Leung Yuen-ting, Chan Kwok-wai	49,745	17.84 (16.67+1.17)	+2.95
Democracy Groundwork	**Lau Siu-lai**	38,183	13.69	N/A
Civic	**Claudia Mo Man-ching** Joshua Li Chun-hei	32,323	11.59	–4.75
Democratic	**Wong Pik-wan** Ramon Yuen Hoi-man, Joshua Fung Man-tao, Chau Man-fong	26,037	9.34	–6.18
Youngspiration	**Yau Wai-ching**	20,643	7.40	N/A
PPI	Wong Yuk-man, Ma Yu-sang	20,219	7.25	–9.37
ADPL	Tam Kwok-kiu, Yeung Yuk, Wong Wing-kit	15,383	5.52	–7.68
Third Side	Tik Chi-yuen, Wong Chun-long, Pang Yi-ting, Chen Lihong	13,461	4.83	N/A
LSD	Avery Ng Man-yuen	6,811	2.44	N/A
Politihk SS	Kwan San-wai, Ko Chi-keung	938	0.34	N/A
Nonpartisan	Augustine Lee Wing-hon, Foo Wai-lok	874	0.31	N/A
Pioneer of Victoria Park	Chu Siu-hung	680	0.24	N/A
Independent	Lam Yi-lai, Au Wing-ho	634	0.23	–0.14
HKLP	Jonathan Ho Chi-kwong	399	0.14	N/A
Total valid votes		278,871	100.00	
Rejected ballots		4,883		
Turnout		283,754	58.13	+4.24
Registered electors		488,129		

↓
**1**	**1**	**1**	**1**	**1**

Vote share
1. DAB (20.4%)
2. People Power (16.6%)
3. Civic (16.3%)
4. Democratic (15.5%)
5. KWND (14.9%)
6. ADPL (13.2%)
7. Other (3.02%)

2012 Legislative Council election: Kowloon West
List	Candidates	Votes	Of total (%)	± from prev.
**Quota**		46,416	20.00	
DAB	**Chiang Lai-wan** Chris Ip Ngo-tung, Vincent Cheng Wing-shun, Chan Wai-ming, Lam Sum-lim	47,363	20.41 (20.00+0.41)	+1.51
People Power	**Wong Yuk-man** Yim Tat-ming, Chau Tsun-kiu, Lau Tit-wai	38,578	16.62	−1.58
Civic	**Claudia Mo Man-ching** Joe Wong Tak-chuen	37,925	16.34	+7.94
Democratic	**Wong Pik-wan** Cheung Man-kwong, Li Yiu-kee, Yuen Hoi-man, Chong Miu-sheung	36,029	15.52	+1.12
KWND	**Leung Mei-fun** Yang Wing-kit, Wai Hoi-ying, Leung Man-kwong	34,548	14.89	+5.29
ADPL	Tam Kwok-kiu, Liu Sing-lee, Rosanda Mok Ka-han, Wong Chi-yung, Austen Ng Po-shan	30,634	13.20	−4.00
Independent	Wong Yee-him	3,746	1.61	N/A
Ind. democrat	Wong Yat-yuk	2,399	1.03	N/A
Awakening Association	Lam Yi-lai, Simon Ho Ka-kuen, Au Wing-ho, Lee Ka-wai	859	0.37	+0.07
Total valid votes		232,081	100.00	
Rejected ballots		3,952		
Turnout		236,033	53.89	+9.12
Registered electors		437,968		

2010 Kowloon West by-election
Party	Candidate	Votes	%	±%
**LSD**	**Wong Yuk-man**	**60,395**	**67.77**	
Nonpartisan	Pamela Peck Wan-kam	16,640	18.67	
Tertiary 2012	Wong Weng-chi	3,429	3.85	
Nonpartisan	Chiang Sai-cheong	3,109	3.49	
Nonpartisan	Shea Kai-chuen	2,517	2.82	
Nonpartisan	Kenneth Cheung Kam-chung	1,869	2.10	
Nonpartisan	Lam Yi-lai	1,069	1.20	
Nonpartisan	Kwok Shiu-ming	91	0.10	
Majority		43,755	49.10	
Total valid votes		89,119	100.00	
Rejected ballots		2,682		
Turnout		91,801	21.13	
Registered electors		434,519		
LSD **hold**		Swing		

=== 2000s ===

↓
**1**	**1**	**1**	**1**	**1**

Vote share
1. DAB (18.9%)
2. LSD (18.2%)
3. ADPL (17.2%)
4. Democratic (14.4%)
5. Civic (8.40%)
6. Liberal (6.30%)
7. Other (16.6%)

2008 Legislative Council election: Kowloon West
List	Candidates	Votes	Of total (%)	± from prev.
**Quota**		41,317	20.00	
DAB	**Starry Lee Wai-king** Chung Kong-mo, Chan Wai-ming, Vincent Cheng Wing-shun	39,013	18.88	−8.25
LSD	**Wong Yuk-man** Lee Wai-yee	37,553	18.18	N/A
ADPL	**Frederick Fung Kin-kee** Rosanda Mok Ka-han, Tsung Po-shan, Wong Chi Yung, Yeung Chun-yu	35,440	17.16	−2.89
Democratic	**James To Kun-sun** Lam Ho-yeung	29,690	14.37	−12.22
Nonpartisan	**Priscilla Leung Mei-fun** Edward Leung Wai-keun, Aaron Lam Ka-fai	19,914	9.64	N/A
Civic	Claudia Mo Man-ching, Ng Yuet-lan, Tang Chi-ying	17,259	8.35	N/A
Liberal	Michael Tien Puk-sun, Ho Hin-ming	13,011	6.30	N/A
Nonpartisan	Lau Chin-shek	10,553	5.11	N/A
Independent	Tam Hoi-pong	1,603	0.78	N/A
Nonpartisan	Francis Chong Wing-charn	1,076	0.52	N/A
SDA	James Lung Wai-man, Bantawa Sukra	591	0.29	N/A
Nonpartisan	Lam Yi-lai	590	0.29	N/A
Nonpartisan	Lau Yuk-shing, Nandeed Cheung Kit-fung, David Tsui	290	0.14	N/A
Total valid votes		206,583	100.00	
Rejected ballots		1,182		
Turnout		207,765	47.18	−7.56
Registered electors		440,335		

↓
**1**	**1**	**1**	**1**

Vote share
1. DAB (27.1%)
2. Democratic (26.6%)
3. ADPL (26.4%)
4. Other (19.9%)

2004 Legislative Council election: Kowloon West
List	Candidates	Votes	Of total (%)	± from prev.
**Quota**		56,924	25.00	
DAB	**Jasper Tsang Yok-sing** Chung Kong-mo, Starry Lee Wai-king	61,770	27.13 (25.00+2.13)	+3.59
Democratic	**James To Kun-sun** Chan Ka-wai, Lam Ho-yeung, Ma Kee	60,539	26.59 (25.00+1.59)	−14.68
ADPL	**Frederick Fung Kin-kee**	45,649	20.05	−15.14
Nonpartisan	**Lau Chin-shek**	43,460	19.09	N/A
ADPL	Liu Sing-lee	13,452	5.91	N/A
Nonpartisan	Lau Yuk-shing, Leung Suet-fong, Lau Po-kwan	1,824	0.80	N/A
Turnout		227,694	54.74	+12.60
Total valid votes		227,694	100.00	
Rejected ballots		2,368		
Turnout		230,062	54.74	+12.60
Registered electors		420,259		

↓
**2**	**1**	**1**

Vote share
1. Democratic (41.3%)
2. ADPL (35.2%)
3. DAB (23.5%)

2000 Legislative Council election: Kowloon West
List	Candidates	Votes	Of total (%)	± from prev.
**Quota**		44,550	25.00	
Democratic (CTU)	**Lau Chin-shek, James To Kun-sun**	73,540	41.27 (25.00+16.27)	−13.75
ADPL	**Frederick Fung Kin-kee** Liu Sing-lee	62,717	35.19 (25.00+10.19)	+15.95
DAB	**Jasper Tsang Yok-sing** Chung Kong-mo, Pun Kwok-wah, Wong Wai-chuen	41,942	23.54	+1.77
Total valid votes		178,199	100.00	
Rejected ballots		1,447		
Turnout		179,646	42.14	–9.09
Registered electors		426,288		

=== 1990s ===
↓
**2**	**1**

Vote share
1. Democratic (55.1%)
2. DAB (21.7%)
3. ADPL (19.3%)
4. Liberal (2.90%)
5. Other (1.00%)

1998 Legislative Council election: Kowloon West
List	Candidates	Votes	Of total (%)	± from prev.
**Quota**		68,467	33.33	
Democratic	**Lau Chin-shek, James To Kun-sun** Eric Wong Chong-ki	113,079	55.05 (33.33+21.72)	
DAB	**Jasper Tsang Yok-sing** Ip Kwok-chung, Wen Choy-bon	44,632	21.73	
ADPL	Frederick Fung Kin-kee, Liu Sing-lee, Tam Kwok-kiu	39,534	19.25	
Liberal	Ringo Chiang Sai-cheong, Chan Noi-yue, Edward Li King-wah	5,854	2.85	
Atlas Alliance	Helen Chung Yee-fong	2,302	1.12	
Total valid votes		205,401	100.00	
Rejected ballots		1,281		
Turnout		206,682	50.23	
Registered electors		411,468		

== See also ==
- List of constituencies of Hong Kong
