= Vincent Cheng Wing-shun =

Hong Kong politician

The Honourable Vincent Cheng Wing-shun MH
- 鄭泳舜
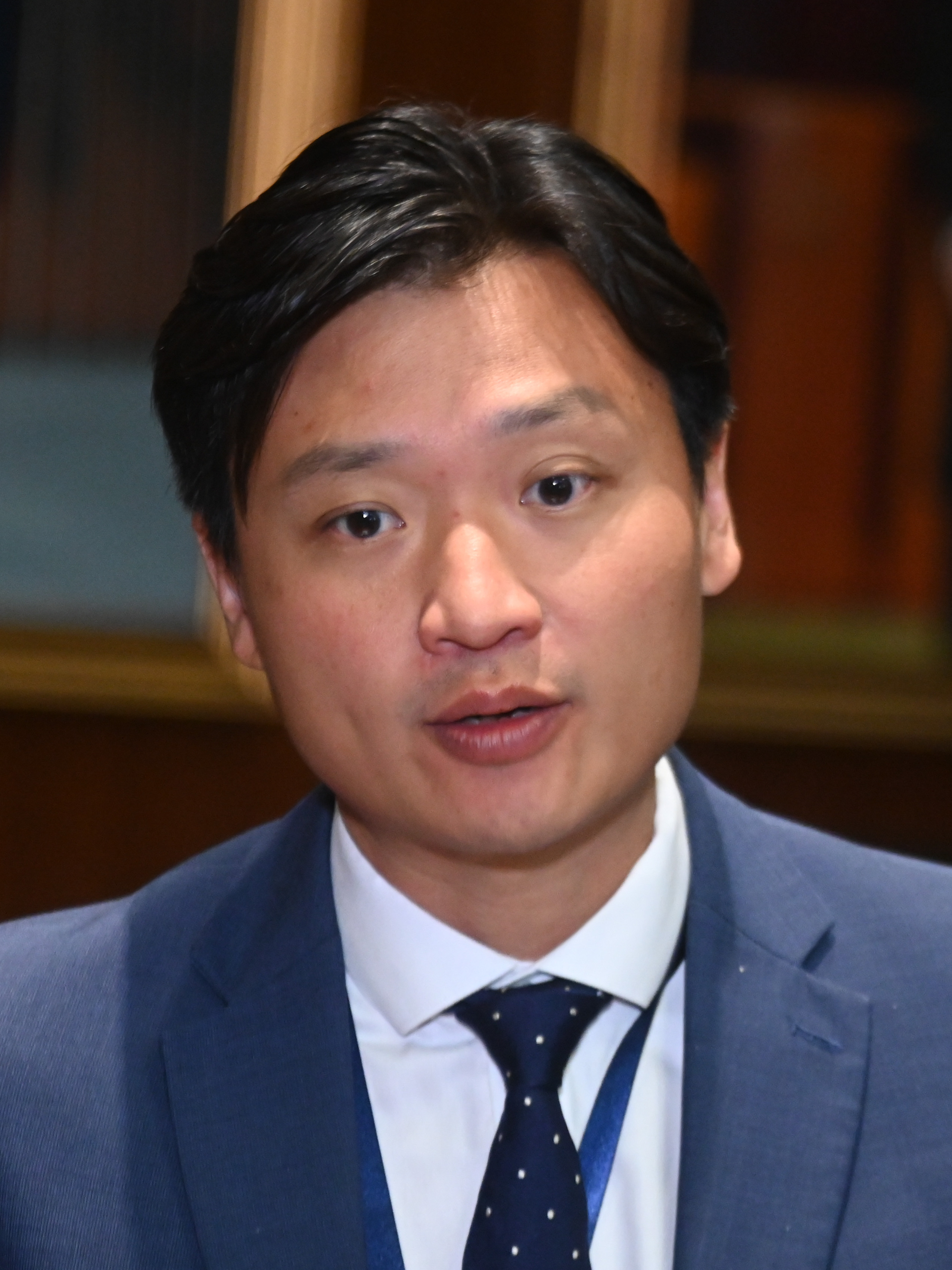
- Cheng in 2024

Member of the Legislative Council
- Incumbent
- Assumed office 1 January 2022
- Preceded by: New constituency
- Constituency: Kowloon West
- In office 12 March 2018 – 31 December 2021
- Preceded by: Yau Wai-ching
- Succeeded by: Constituency abolished
- Constituency: Kowloon West

Member of Sham Shui Po District Council
- In office 1 January 2008 – 31 December 2019
- Preceded by: Leung Hon-wah
- Succeeded by: Lao Ka-hang
- Constituency: Nam Cheong North

Personal details
- Born: 18 July 1979 (age 47)
- Party: Democratic Alliance for the Betterment and Progress of Hong Kong
- Spouse: Carrie Wu Ho-yee
- Parent: Eric Cheng Kam-chung
- Education: University of Auckland
- Occupation: Politician
- Website: vincentcheng.org

Vincent Cheng Wing-shun
- Traditional Chinese: 鄭泳舜
- Simplified Chinese: 郑泳舜
Transcriptions
Standard Mandarin
- Hanyu Pinyin: Zhèng Yǒngshùn
Yue: Cantonese
- Jyutping: Zeng6 Wing6 Seon3

Vincent Cheng Wing-shun, MH (Chinese: 鄭泳舜; born 18 July 1979) is a Hong Kong politician. He is the current member of the Legislative Council member for Kowloon West and former member of the Sham Shui Po District Council for Nam Cheong North from 2015 to 2019. As a member of Democratic Alliance for the Betterment and Progress of Hong Kong (DAB), he made an upset in the 2018 Legislative Council by-election in Kowloon West, being the first pro-Beijing candidate to defeat a pro-democracy opponent in an open by-election since 1992.

== Career ==
Cheng was a son of the former Po Leung Kuk chairman Eric Cheng Kam-chung who is also a clothing retailing and computer accessories retailing businessman. He was raised in Nam Shan Estate before his father became rich. He and his family emigrated to New Zealand where he studied statistics at the University of Auckland and returned to Hong Kong in 2003 after graduation.

He started involving in community services in 2005 and joined the Democratic Alliance for the Betterment and Progress of Hong Kong (DAB), the largest Beijing-loyalist party in 2006. He became a member of the Sham Shui Po District Council when he contested in the 2007 District Council elections, winning a seat in Nam Cheong North against two pro-democracy candidates. In 2008, he stood in the Kowloon West in the Legislative Council election on the DAB ticket, being placed on the fourth position.

He went on being re-elected to the Sham Shui Po District Council in 2011 and 2015. He also ran in the 2012 Legislative Council election, standing as the third candidate on the DAB ticket in Kowloon West, which helped Ann Chiang to be elected with more than 47,000 votes.

In the March 2018 Legislative Council Kowloon West by-election triggered by the disqualification of Youngspiration's Yau Wai-ching over the oath-taking controversy, Cheng defeated another DAB member Chris Ip Ngo-tung in an intra-party selection to represent the party in the election. He made an upset in Kowloon West by narrowly defeating independent democrat Yiu Chung-yim, making it the first time the pro-Beijing camp received greater vote share than the pro-democrats in a geographical constituency since 2000 and the first time a pro-Beijing candidate won in a geographical constituency by-election since 1992. He lost his seat on the District Council in the 2019 District Council elections in Hong Kong.

== Personal life ==
He married Dr. Carrie Wu Ho-yee, an older sister of Hong Kong actress Myolie Wu.

In April 2022, he was tested positive for COVID-19.

Cheng also serves as vice-chairman of the Hong Kong Sports Institute.

== See also ==
- List of Hong Kong by-elections

Political offices
Preceded by Leung Hon-wah	Member of Sham Shui Po District Council; Representative for Nam Cheong North; 2008–2019	Succeeded by Lao Ka-hang
Assembly seats
New constituency	Member of Legislative Council; Representative for Kowloon West; 2022–present	Incumbent
Preceded by Yau Wai-ching	Member of Legislative Council; Representative for Kowloon West; 2018–2021	Constituency abolished
Order of precedence
Preceded by Au Nok-hin; Member of the Legislative Council	Hong Kong order of precedence Member of the Legislative Council	Succeeded by Tony Tse; Member of the Legislative Council
