= Ann Chiang =

Hong Kong politician

Dr the Honourable Chiang Lai-wan SBS JP
- 蔣麗芸
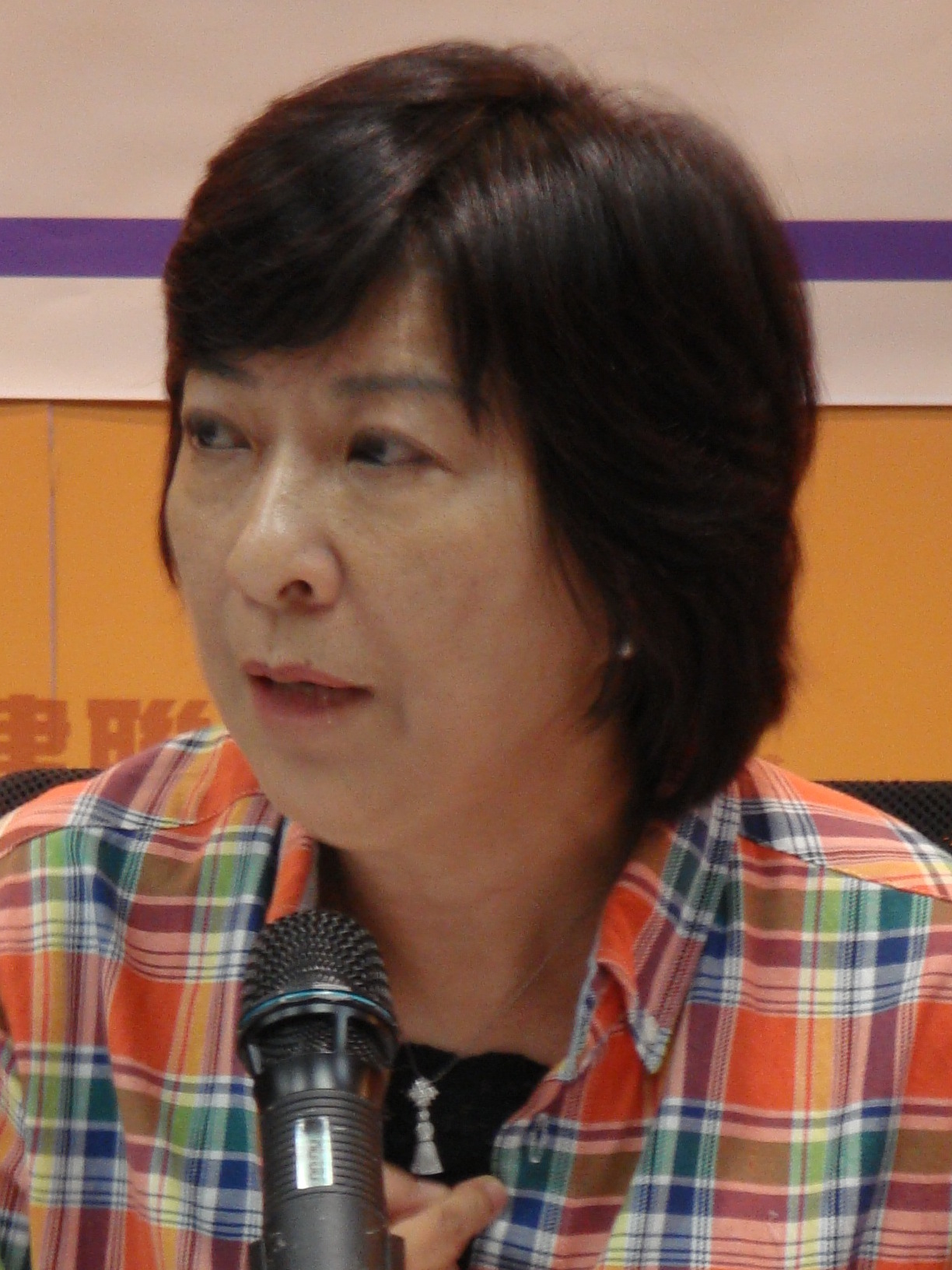

Member of the Legislative Council
- In office 1 October 2012 – 31 December 2021
- Preceded by: Starry Lee
- Succeeded by: Constituency abolished
- Constituency: Kowloon West

Personal details
- Born: 16 May 1955 (age 71) Hong Kong
- Party: Democratic Alliance for the Betterment and Progress of Hong Kong (since 2000)
- Education: Concordia University (BA); Chinese University of Hong Kong (MA); Chinese Academy of Social Sciences (LD)
- Occupation: Legislative Councillor entrepreneur politician

Ann Chiang
- Traditional Chinese: 蔣麗芸
Transcriptions
Yue: Cantonese
- Yale Romanization: Jéung Laih wàhn
- Jyutping: Zoeng^{2} Lai^{6} wan^{4}

Ann Chiang Lai-wan, SBS, JP, (Chinese: 蔣麗芸 was born on 16 May 1955) is the chair of C&L Holdings and a former pro-Beijing member of Hong Kong Legislative Council. She is the second daughter of Chiang Chen who was a Hong Kong entrepreneur.

== Background ==
Chiang was a member of the Chinese People's Political Consultative Conference from 1993 to 2013.

In 2000, Chiang joined Democratic Alliance for the Betterment and Progress of Hong Kong (DAB) and was appointed the vice-chairman of the organisation in 2007. In 1981, she received a Bachelor of Arts from Concordia University. Since 2005, she has served as non-executive director in Elec & Eltek International Holdings and chairman of C&L Holdings.

Chiang was formerly a member of the Council of the City University of Hong Kong.

In 2012, Chiang was elected Member of Legislative Council (Representative for Kowloon West) and retained her seat in 2016.

== Controversies ==
Though the Cantonese language is predominant in Hong Kong, Chiang took her 2016 oath of office in Mandarin Chinese. After the government sought to prevent localist candidates from taking office for not reading their oaths accurately, it was pointed out that Chiang had mispronounced several words in Mandarin, thus calling the validity of her oath into question.

In 2019, amidst the 2019–20 Hong Kong protests, Chiang shared a video on her Facebook page alleging that Civil Human Rights Front convener Jimmy Sham had "never mentioned his sexual orientation," urging her supporters to share the video. Following complaints from LGBT activists, a Facebook spokesperson confirmed that the post had been removed for violating the social media platform's Community Standards. Chiang responded, "If you’ve already came out, then face it. Don’t easily complain someone’s attacking you, understood?" Sham stated that Chiang was incorrect as he had publicly identified himself as a member of LGBT activist group Rainbow Action and welcomed Facebook's deletion of the post.

During the COVID-19 pandemic, Hong Kong experienced a shortage of surgical masks. Chiang publicly advocated steaming masks to sterilise them for re-use by reposting a video from the Chinese broadcaster Guangzhou Broadcasting Network on Facebook demonstrating the practice. Centre for Health Protection controller Wong Ka-hing, a physician, rebuked Chiang's claim, while the centre warned Hong Kongers that surgical masks cannot be reused by steaming, and not to believe messages from "unreliable sources". Fellow legislator Helena Wong called on Chiang to step down as chairman of the Legislative Council's Panel on Health Services. In the face of widespread criticism and ridicule, Chiang stood by her claims, and claimed that medical workers who were infected with SARS in 2003 after re-using face masks would have been fine if they steamed them.

In January 2021, Chiang blamed university representatives for the 2019-2020 Hong Kong protests, stating that "Our taxpayers pay so much money every year to send their children to universities. But in the end, it has become a breeding ground for Hong Kong independence," as well as saying "Every president, vice-president, the ones responsible for management - shame on you!"

Legislative Council of Hong Kong
Preceded by Starry Lee	Member of Legislative Council; Representative for Kowloon West; 2012–2021	Constituency abolished
Order of precedence
Preceded by Poon Siu-ping; Member of the Legislative Council	Hong Kong order of precedence Member of the Legislative Council	Succeeded by Lo Wai-kwok; Member of the Legislative Council
