= Politihk Social Strategic =

Politihk Social Strategic 香港政研會
- Chairman: Innes Tang
- Founded: 10 April 2016
- Membership: 60
- Ideology: Chinese nationalism Chinese conservatism
- Political position: Right-wing to far-right
- Regional affiliation: Pro-Beijing camp
- Colours: Magenta

Politihk Social Strategic (Chinese: 香港政研會) is a political organisation in Hong Kong founded by a group of pro-Beijing activists in 2016 who opposed the 2014 Hong Kong protests and support the Leung Chun-ying administration.

== History ==
Its stated aim is to fight for the restoration of the law and order, social stability in Hong Kong and opposes pan-democrats' filibustering in the Legislative Council of Hong Kong (LegCo) and opposes Hong Kong independence.

It was established on 10 April 2016 by a group of pro-Beijing activists who took part to oppose the 2014 Occupy protests. They had held many rallies, assemblies and forums in the name of "anti-violence and anti-Occupy Central". In the 2016 Legislative Council election, the group fielded two lists with four candidates in Kowloon West and New Territories West but none of them were elected.

After Chief Executive Leung Chun-ying announced that he would not to seek re-election in December 2016, the group organised a rally to Leung's "achievements" which was attended by about a hundred people. In February 2017 the group held a rally in support of the police officers convicted of beating up a demonstrator during the 2014 protests. Soon after they adopted more pro-police stance. They also held a rally to celebrate Carrie Lam's victory in the 2017 Chief Executive election.

== See also ==
- Alliance for Peace and Democracy (Hong Kong)
- Patriot Alliance Association (Taiwan)
