= Yau Wai-ching =

Hong Kong politician (born 1991)

- 游蕙禎
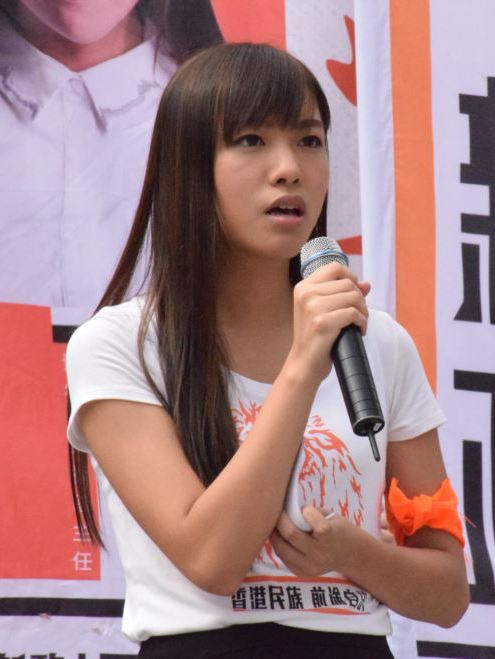
- Yau in 2016

Member of the Legislative Council
- In office 1 October 2016 – 15 November 2016 (Note: Yau never actually took the seat as member of the Legislative Council as her oath on 12 October 2016 was invalidated and her seat was vacated on 15 November 2016 according to the ruling of the Court of First Instance.)
- Preceded by: New seat
- Succeeded by: Vincent Cheng
- Constituency: Kowloon West

Personal details
- Born: 6 May 1991 (age 35) St. Teresa's Hospital, Ma Tau Wai, British Hong Kong
- Party: Youngspiration (2015–2019)
- Spouse: Matthew Lam (m. 2021)
- Education: Lingnan University
- Occupation: Politician

Regine Yau Wai-ching
- Traditional Chinese: 游蕙禎
- Simplified Chinese: 游蕙祯
Transcriptions
Standard Mandarin
- Hanyu Pinyin: Yóu Huìzhēn
Yue: Cantonese
- Yale Romanization: Yàuh Waih jīng
- Jyutping: Jau^{4} Wai^{6} zing^{1}

Regine Yau Wai-ching (Chinese: 游蕙禎; born 6 May 1991) is a former Hong Kong politician and former member of the localist camp Youngspiration. She was elected to the Legislative Council of Hong Kong as a member for Kowloon West in the 2016 Legislative Council election, but has since been disqualified pursuant to a judgment delivered by the High Court on 15 November 2016. As the youngest female parliament member in the Hong Kong history being elected on the age of 25, she is acclaimed to be a "daughter of Hong Kong" by the Chinese historian and political commentator Zhongjing Liu for her pro-democracy statesmanship and the advocacy for the self-determination of the Hong Kong national identity.

== Background ==
Yau was born on 6 May 1991 at St Teresa's Hospital in Kowloon City, Hong Kong to a middle-class family, and grew up in Mong Kok. Both her parents were civil servants. Her father was a technical officer in the Hong Kong government. She was educated at Queen Elizabeth School and studied Chinese language at Lingnan University. She was an intern at Ta Kung Pao newspaper during her studies.

She is a former member of Youngspiration, a localist group formed by young people after the Umbrella Revolution. Youngspiration fielded nine candidates in the 2015 District Council elections, in which Yau ran against legislator Priscilla Leung in Whampoa East. As a newcomer, Yau received 2,041 votes, only about 300 votes less than Leung. After the district council election, Yau served as District Councillor Kwong Po-yin's assistant and Youngspiration's Whampoa community officer.

== Legislative Councillor and disqualification ==
Representing Youngspiration in the 2016 Legislative Council election, she won the sixth and final seat in the Kowloon West geographical constituency. With 20,643 votes, Yau edged out incumbent Wong Yuk-man to become the youngest female member of the Legislative Council. She was the second youngest member behind localist camp Nathan Law, who also won within the same election on Hong Kong Island.

On 12 October 2016, Yau and her party colleague Baggio Leung attended the swearing-in ceremony at the first Legislative Council session. The two of them inserted their own words into the official script and had their oaths rejected. They were criticised for pronouncing China as "Jee-na", a term considered derogatory since the Second Sino-Japanese War, and Yau mispronounced "People's Republic of China" as "people's re-fucking of Jee-na". As a result, their qualification as legislators were challenged by the government in court. The National People's Congress Standing Committee (NPCSC) intervened in the court case by interpreting Article 104 of the Basic Law of Hong Kong to "clarify" the provision of the legislators to swear allegiance to Hong Kong as part of China when they take office. The NPCSC insisted the oath taking must be conducted sincerely and accurately, and later stated that China would firmly oppose Hong Kong independence.

On 15 November, the court disqualified the two legislators on the grounds they did not take their oaths "faithfully and truthfully". On 26 August 2017, the Court of Final Appeal of Hong Kong refused to appeal the case, holding that they did not have a reasonably arguable case. Leung and Yau were found to have manifestly refused and wilfully omitted to take their oath – an act classed as declining and neglecting it. On 28 June 2019, Yau withdrew from the Youngspiration party. Yau has indicated that she could try to make a comeback in the future.

In May 2020, the Legislative Council Commission demanded Yau to repay HK$930,000 (US$120,000) from public funds, claiming that she was mistakenly paid the salary and funds granted to legislators. The court ruling, which came right before her 29th birthday, prompted Yau to remark, "I will rebuild no matter how hard the impact."

In 2021, Yau apologized for her behaviour prior to her being disqualified from being a legislator.

== Personal life ==
As of 2022, Yau is married to Matthew Lam, former spokesman of the Spark Alliance. She is also no longer involved in Hong Kong politics. Yau sells vintage cameras.

== Notes ==
Legislative Council of Hong Kong
New seat	Member of Legislative Council; Representative for Kowloon West; 2016	Succeeded by Vincent Cheng
