= Priscilla Leung =

Hong Kong barrister and politician

Professor the Honourable Priscilla Leung GBS JP
- 梁美芬
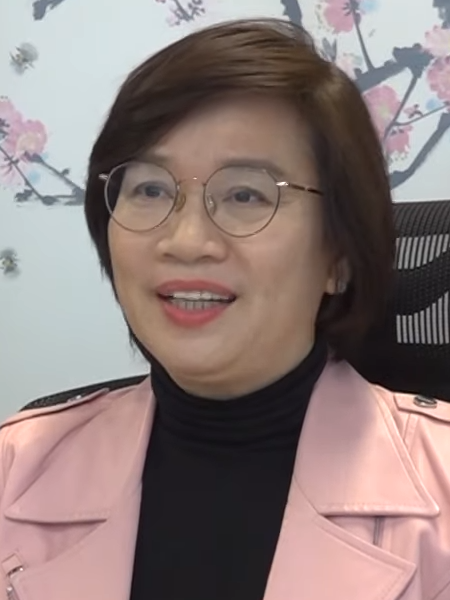
- Leung in 2022

Chairperson of Kowloon West New Dynamic
- Incumbent
- Assumed office 16 March 2008
- Preceded by: New Party

Member of the Legislative Council
- Incumbent
- Assumed office 1 January 2022
- Preceded by: Seat created
- Constituency: Election Committee
- In office 1 January 2008 – 31 December 2021
- Preceded by: Seat created
- Succeeded by: Seat abolished
- Constituency: Kowloon West

Member of the Kowloon City District Council
- In office 1 January 2008 – 31 December 2019
- Preceded by: Chan Ka-wai
- Constituency: Whampoa East

Personal details
- Born: 18 November 1960 (age 65) Hong Kong
- Party: Business and Professionals Alliance for Hong Kong; Kowloon West New Dynamic
- Spouse: Wang Guiguo
- Education: St. Paul's Co-educational College; Chinese University of Hong Kong (BSocSc); Renmin University (LLM, JSD); University of Hong Kong (PCLL)
- Occupation: Barrister professor of practice
- Profession: Legislative Councillor

Priscilla Leung
- Chinese: 梁美芬
Transcriptions
Standard Mandarin
- Hanyu Pinyin: Liáng Měifēn
Yue: Cantonese
- Yale Romanization: Lèuhng Méih fān
- Jyutping: Loeng^{4} Mei^{5} fan^{1}

Priscilla Leung Mei-fun GBS JP (Chinese: 梁美芬; born 18 November 1960, Hong Kong) is a barrister and Hong Kong Legislative Councillor, representing the Election Committee since 2022 until now. She previously represented the Kowloon West constituency from 2008 to 2021. She was also a member of Kowloon City District Council.

== Legal career ==
Leung began her legal career in the China department at the law firm Johnson Stokes & Master. She is a barrister and professor of practice at the City University of Hong Kong's School of Law, where her husband, Wang Guiguo, was the Dean. She has taught at the School of Law for more than 24 years and specialises in Chinese law, Hong Kong Basic Law, and conflict of laws between mainland China and Hong Kong.

== Political career ==
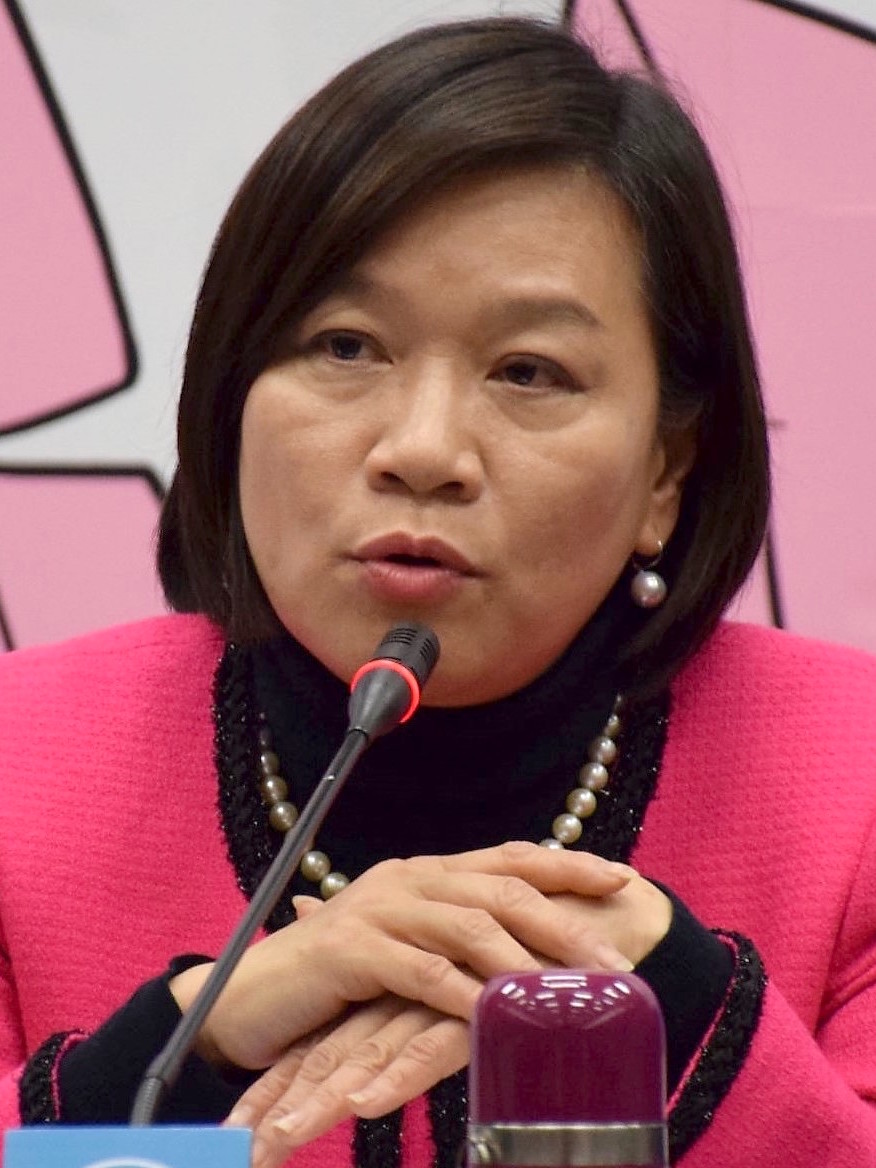
Leung in 2017

Leung has been a Legislative Councillor since 2008, currently representing the Business and Professionals Alliance for Hong Kong. The 'independent' label she first stood under was challenged by political opponents who accused her of having the support of the Liaison Office of the Central People's Government and the pro-Beijing Hong Kong Federation of Trade Unions, which didn't have a candidate running in the constituency. Leung has been a supporter of most government bills and has often exchanged different views with pro-democracy lawmakers.

She is the chairman of the Legislative Council's Panel on Administration of Justice and Legal Services.

Leung was active in opposition to the pro-democracy Occupy Central/Umbrella movements that culminated in widespread protests in 2014.

In December 2021, she was re-elected again through Election Committee constituency with 1,348 votes.

In December 2025, she was re-elected again through Election Committee constituency with 1,316 votes.

== Views and controversies ==
=== LegCo members' resignations and by-election ===
On 21 January 2010, in a response to the quasi-referendum on universal suffrage, triggered by the resignation of five pan-democrat members of LegCo, Leung announced she would introduce a private member's bill to forbid legislators who resign from running in elections in the same four-year term. Ronny Tong criticised her move as a contravention of the Basic Law: he said such a bill would infringe the right to stand for elections protected under Article 26 and would be inconsistent with Article 74 which prohibits individual legislators from tabling bills that relate to the political structure.

A less-extreme government bill, imposing a six-month prohibition on running for election after resignation, was passed in May 2012, in the face of filibustering efforts from legislators Leung Kwok-hung and Albert Chan.

=== Scouts for Occupy Central Movement ===
In July 2014, she championed the Hong Kong Government's establishment of the "Voluntary Scouts".

=== Covid-19 ===
On 24 December 2020, Leung criticized the Hong Kong government's response to coronavirus disease 2019, stating that it was "worse than that of the United Kingdom." On that day, the United Kingdom reported a cumulative total of 2,149,551 cases (3.233% of its total population), whereas Hong Kong reported a cumulative total of 8,353 cases (0.112% of its total population), a rate per capita of about 29 times less than that of the United Kingdom.

=== Primaries ===
In January 2021, following the arrest of 53 pro-democracy figures in Hong Kong for organizing primaries for the 2020 Legislative Council, Leung stated that the government should investigate whether the primaries were a violation of the National Security Law.

=== Dual citizenship ===
Leung has claimed that dual nationality is not allowed in Hong Kong, even though high-level government officials, including Carrie Lam, Tam Yiu-chung, and Tung Chee-hwa have children with foreign citizenship.

=== Electoral changes ===
In February 2021, Leung said that a special committee should be created to vet people who run for elections, claiming that some had been voted into office and then called for Hong Kong independence or self-determination. Leung said that creating a "eligibility vetting committee" to filter out certain candidates would close the loophole. Leung also called for the education system to be run by "patriots," stating that "We need to demonstrate 'patriots governing Hong Kong' in the city's education, politics and law."

=== Homosexuality ===
Leung is a social conservative, opposed to same-sex marriage and equal rights for same-sex couples. In 2019, she criticised the Airport Authority and the MTR Corporation for reversing their decision to ban a Cathay Pacific ad featuring a same-sex couple holding hands. Former lawmaker Cyd Ho remarked, "People like Priscilla Leung, who dare to teach law at university and get enough votes to sit in Legco, have no idea about human rights or equality."

Leung said the government should not help secure venues for the 2022 Gay Games in Hong Kong, and claimed that most people in Hong Kong would want to "protect the heterosexual marriage system". In June 2023, Leung said that Western children were being taught things that challenged "traditional values," and that Hong Kong "must not go down this bad path." In November 2023, Leung said that "any discussion on gay marriage would tear apart Hong Kong society with an impact that could be worse than the enactment of the Basic Law's Article 23."

=== English ===
Though Hong Kong medical schools teach in English, Leung in July 2022 criticized the requirement that English be the language of instruction for a program that recruits doctors from medical schools outside of Hong Kong.

=== British Hong Kong ===
In July 2022, Leung claimed that "Hong Kong was never a colony" was nothing new.

=== Walk out ===
In October 2022, during a Legislative Council Panel on Health Services, Leung was warned 4 times not to keep switching between English and Cantonese; Leung then flung the document from her hands and left the meeting.

=== 2023 District Council ===
In January 2024, after the 2023 local elections produced a record-low turnout, Leung said that the turnout would have been better if it were not for some technical glitches.

=== Jimmy Lai ===
In November 2022, Leung said that if Hong Kong courts allowed Jimmy Lai to hire Tim Owen, then Beijing might get involved to block the hiring of Owen. In response, Ronny Tong said that it was inappropriate to comment on cases before rulings were issued. Professor Johannes Chan Man-mun, former law dean of HKU, said that the NPCSC interpretation "may severely compromise Hong Kong as an international city," and that calls to have the NPCSC intervene before the court had issued its decision were "disturbing" and could undermine the rule of law and judicial independence in the city.

Leung was earlier one of the most vocal supporters of having the NPCSC intervene in the matter, but in December 2022, backtracked and said that there was a "strong chance" the NPCSC would not step in, and said "Apart from interpreting the law, the issue can also be resolved by looking at other articles in the legislation and considering other solutions."

In January 2023, after the NPCSC interpreted the law and gave the Chief Executive power to ban foreign lawyers, Leung echoed Tam Yiu-chung's opinion that it would only benefit the city.

In May 2023, the Legislative Council voted with 100% approval to let the chief executive restrict overseas lawyers from national security cases, following attempts by the government to block Jimmy Lai from hiring Tim Owen as his defense lawyer; Leung said that the new law showed that Hong Kong was "very tolerant."

==== Visas ====
In March 2023, Leung said of the government's proposal to potentially ban already-admitted foreign lawyers that "My understanding is that [the amendment] will not rule out the use of other measures... such as if we do not grant visas to those deemed unsuitable to enter [the city]."

== Education ==
- St. Paul's Co-educational College
- BSSc Social Sciences (Government and Public Administration), The Chinese University of Hong Kong
- Common Professional Examination, HKU SPACE & Manchester Metropolitan University
- Postgraduate Certificate in Laws, University of Hong Kong
- LLM, Renmin University of China
- Doctor of Juridical Science, Renmin University of China

== Family ==
In March 2022, Leung revealed that her brother died from COVID-19 after earlier receiving one vaccine dose in February 2022, though the government recommended that citizens receive 3 doses. Leung criticized the government for supposedly not allocating medical resources properly.

== Publications ==
Leung published different articles and books, in English and Chinese, on the areas of Chinese law, Hong Kong Basic Law, and conflict of laws between mainland China, Hong Kong and Taiwan.

- China Law Reports. Butterworths Asia. (1992–94)
- Legal Reform of China (co-ed). Joint Publishing Hong Kong. (1994)
- China International Economic and Trade Arbitration Commission Awards. Sweet & Maxwell Asia.(1998)
- Comparative Studies of Family Law between mainland China, Taiwan and Hong Kong. Joint Publishing Hong Kong. (2003)
- The Hong Kong Basic Law: Hybrid of Chinese Law and Common Law. LexisNexis. (2007)

== Awards ==
Leung was awarded the Ten Outstanding Young Persons award for the year 2000 by the Christian group Junior Chamber International Hong Kong who, in 2015, claimed membership of about 2,000.

Political offices
Preceded by Chan Ka-wai	Member of Kowloon City District Council; Representative for Whampoa East; 2008–2019	Succeeded by Kwan Ka-lun
Legislative Council of Hong Kong
New seat	Member of Legislative Council; Representative for Kowloon West; 2008–2021	Seat abolished
New seat	Member of Legislative Council; Representative for Election Committee; 2022–present	Incumbent
Party political offices
New political party	Chairperson of Kowloon West New Dynamic; 2008–present	Incumbent
Order of precedence
Preceded by Chan Kin-por; Member of the Legislative Council	Hong Kong order of precedence Member of the Legislative Council	Succeeded by Paul Tse; Member of the Legislative Council
