= Helena Wong (politician) =

Hong Kong politician (born 1959)

- 黃碧雲
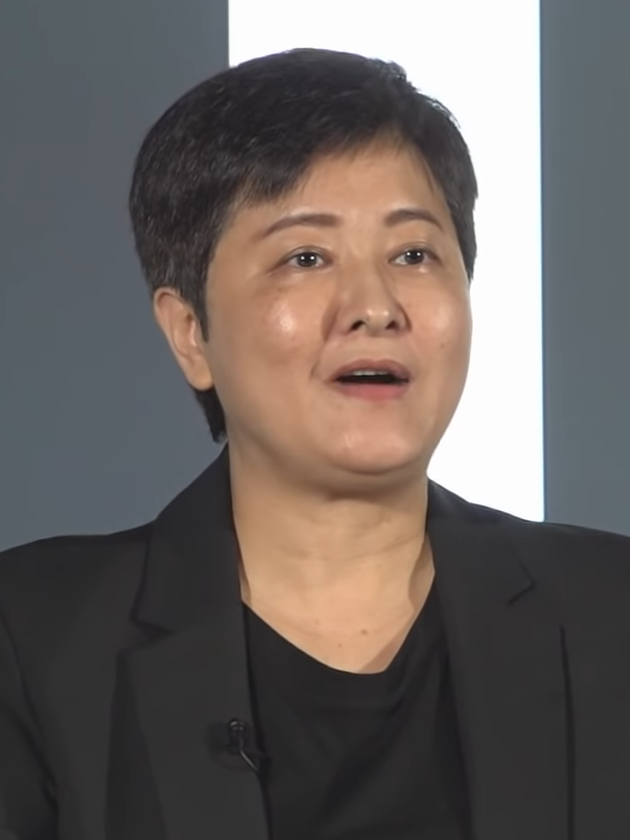
- Wong in 2020

Member of the Legislative Council
- In office 1 October 2012 – 1 December 2020
- Preceded by: James To
- Succeeded by: Constituency abolished
- Constituency: Kowloon West

Personal details
- Born: 21 March 1959 (age 67)
- Party: Democratic Foundation (1989–90); United Democrats (1990–94); Democratic Party (1994–2025)
- Spouse: Shae Wan-chaw (m. 2001)
- Education: Kowloon True Light School; Chinese University of Hong Kong (B.A., M.Phil.); University of California, Los Angeles (M.A., Ph.D.)
- Occupation: Lecturer

Helena Wong Pik-wan (Chinese: 黃碧雲, born 21 March 1959) is a former member of the Legislative Council of Hong Kong for Kowloon West constituency. She is also an academic staff member at Hong Kong Polytechnic University.

== Background ==
Wong was born in Hong Kong in 1959, and graduated from the Chinese University of Hong Kong with a Bachelor of Arts in Religion and Master of Philosophy in Government and Public Administration. She continued on to receive her Master of Arts and Doctor of Philosophy in political science from the University of California, Los Angeles.

She joined the Hong Kong Christian Council in 1984, working on Publication, public policies and social affairs, and promotion of civic education. She co-founded the Hong Kong Christian Institute in 1988, an ecumenical Christian non-governmental organisation outside the institutional constraints of the church. She also chaired the Hong Kong Women Christian Council from 1999 to 2002.

She has lectured at Hong Kong Polytechnic University (PolyU) from 1999 to 2019, with a focus on Hong Kong and mainland China, and women's issues. She held the coordinator position for the theme on “Chinese political system and legal system” of GEC2801 China Studies from 2004 to 2006. She retired from PolyU on 30 June 2019.

== Political career ==
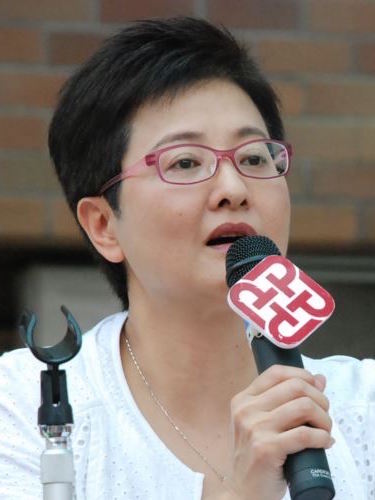
Wong in 2016

Wong joined the Hong Kong Democratic Foundation in 1989 and co-founded the first major pro-democracy party, the United Democrats of Hong Kong which became the Democratic Party in 1994.

She became a member in the Election Committee for the Higher Education sub-sector in 2011.

In 2012, Wong was elected into the Legislative Council of Hong Kong for the Kowloon West constituency.

She gained fame when she exposed the lead contamination in tap water at Kai Ching Estate in Kowloon City. The incidents were dubbed the "Hong Kong water-gate" in July 2015.

In the lead-up to the 2020 Hong Kong legislative election, Wong received the highest amount of opposition among Democratic Party members in the party's special convention to decide its candidates. Following her loss in the 2020 Hong Kong pro-democracy primaries, Wong announced that she would retire from the Legislative Council and not participate in the upcoming LegCo election as a candidate.

== Arrests ==
Wong was arrested on 1 November 2020, along with six other democrats, in connection with the melee that had broken out in the LegCo on 8 May 2020. On that day, Starry Lee, the incumbent chair of the House Committee of the Legislative Council, had attempted to commence a meeting of the committee after extended stalling tactics of the pan-democratic camp over the previous months.

On 6 January 2021, Wong was among 53 members of the pro-democratic camp who were arrested under the national security law, specifically its provision regarding alleged subversion. The group stood accused of the organisation of and participation in unofficial primary elections held by the camp in July 2020. Wong was released on bail on 7 January.

In late February 2021, after being charged with subversion, Wong was remanded in custody again along with other 46 activists and politicians. On 4 March, she was among only 15 of the 47 to be granted bail, however, she remained in custody pending an appeal by the Hong Kong government. Her bail application was later upheld by the High Court and she was released on bail. On 1 April 2021, High Court judge Esther Toh explained her rationale to release her on bail. Toh explained that Wong had not signed the declarations of hardcore democrats in maintaining the idea of, once elected, use the power of veto to block the budget and therefore force Chief Executive Carrie Lam to give in to the five demands of the 2019 protests. Toh also highlighted occasions in which Wong voted in favour of government measures and policies and cited her low-risk to reoffend. However, Wong had to present herself before the court on 31 May 2021, when hearings on the subversion case resume.

On 30 May 2024, Wong was found guilty of subversion in the primary elections case, along with 13 other defendants.

== Personal life ==
Wong identifies as a feminist. She decided not to be a traditional housewife, choosing not to get married early in order to focus on her studies. In 2001, she married Shae Wan-chaw, an associate professor at Hong Kong Polytechnic University, at the age of 42.

Legislative Council of Hong Kong
Preceded by James To	Member of Legislative Council; Representative for Kowloon West; 2012–2020	Succeeded by Constituency abolished
