= 6th Legislative Council of Hong Kong =

2016–2020 Legislative Council of Hong Kong

←	5th Legislative Council	7th Legislative Council	→
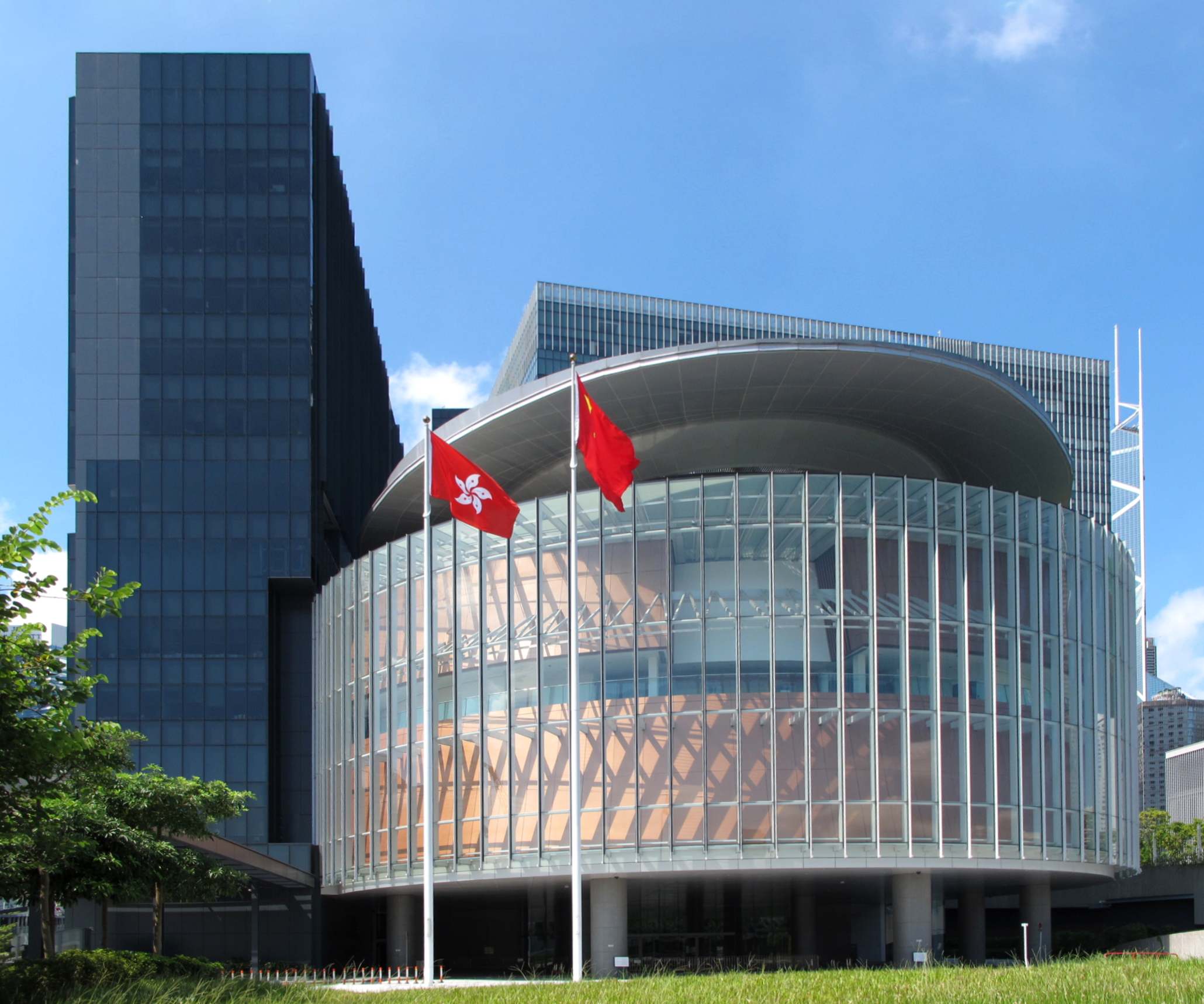

Overview
- Legislative body: Legislative Council
- Jurisdiction: Hong Kong
- Meeting place: Legislative Council Complex
- Term: 1 October 2016 – 31 December 2021
- Election: 2016 election
- Government: Leung Administration (2016-2017); Lam Administration (2017-2021)
- Website: Sixth Legislative Council (2016–2021)
- Members: 70 members
- President: Andrew Leung (BPA)
- Party control: Pro-Beijing camp

The Sixth Legislative Council of Hong Kong was the sixth meeting of the legislative branch of the Hong Kong Special Administrative Region Government. Running from 1 October 2016 to 31 December 2021, it was the longest legislative session in Hong Kong history, lasted for five years and three months. The term of the session was originally from 1 October 2016 to 30 September 2020, but was extended by the National People's Congress Standing Committee (NPCSC) due to the postponement of the 2020 Legislative Council election.

The membership of the session was based on the results of the 2016 Legislative Council election, where the pro-Beijing camp retained the majority in the council and its flagship party Democratic Alliance for the Betterment and Progress of Hong Kong (DAB) continued to be the largest party. The anti-establishment camp, including the traditional pan-democrats and newly emerging localists secured the majority in the geographical constituencies and the one-third crucial minority which allowed them veto any government's proposal on constitutional reform. Notable new members include the post-Occupy activists, Demosisto's Nathan Law, 23, being the youngest member to be elected and Youngspiration's Yau Wai-ching, 25, being the youngest woman to be elected. Other new members include Eddie Chu, Lau Siu-lai, Sixtus Leung, Eunice Yung and Junius Ho.

The council never met its full membership of 70 members, as two Youngspiration legislators Yau Wai-ching and Sixtus Leung were disqualified by the court on 15 November 2016 over their oath-taking manner at the inauguration of the council. Four more pro-democracy legislators, Leung Kwok-hung, Nathan Law, Lau Siu-lai and Yiu Chung-yim were disqualified for the same reason on 14 July 2017, which left a total six vacant seats of which five of them were filled in the March and November by-elections, won by Vincent Cheng, Gary Fan, Au Nok-hin, Tony Tse and Chan Hoi-yan. Fan and Au were later unseated on 17 December 2019 as the by-election result was ruled as invalid by the court, followed by Chan's departure for the same reason.

In 2019, the Carrie Lam administration's introduction of Fugitive Offenders and Mutual Legal Assistance in Criminal Matters Legislation (Amendment) Bill 2019 sparked an unprecedented clash in the council between the pro-Beijing and pro-democracy legislators, and later turned into a series of historic massive protests. Hundred of protesters stormed the Legislative Council Complex after the annual 1 July march and ransacked and vandalised the interior with anti-government slogans. The continued anti-government protests eventually led to the downfall of the bill on 4 September 2019.

On 31 July 2020, Chief Executive Carrie Lam invoked the Emergency Regulations Ordinance to postpone the September general election for a whole year, citing the resurgence of COVID-19 cases and denying any political calculation to thwart opposition momentum and neutralise the pro-democracy movement. The decision was backed by the NPCSC which in November 2021 disqualified four sitting pro-democracy legislators Alvin Yeung, Kwok Ka-ki, Dennis Kwok and Kenneth Leung on the grounds of the newly imposed national security law, which triggered the mass resignations of the remaining 15 pro-democracy legislators, leaving the council with a total number of 27 vacancies out of 70 seats.

In March 2021 the NPCSC unveiled the drastic electoral overhauls to the Chief Executive and Legislative Council, bypassing the power of constitutional changes vested in the Legislative Council. After the passage of the amendments to Annex I and II of the Basic Law, the Carrie Lam administration tabled the Improving Electoral System (Consolidated Amendments) Bill 2021 which was passed in the pro-Beijing dominated Legislative Council with 40-to-2 vote on 27 May 2021.

== Major events ==
=== 2016–2017 ===
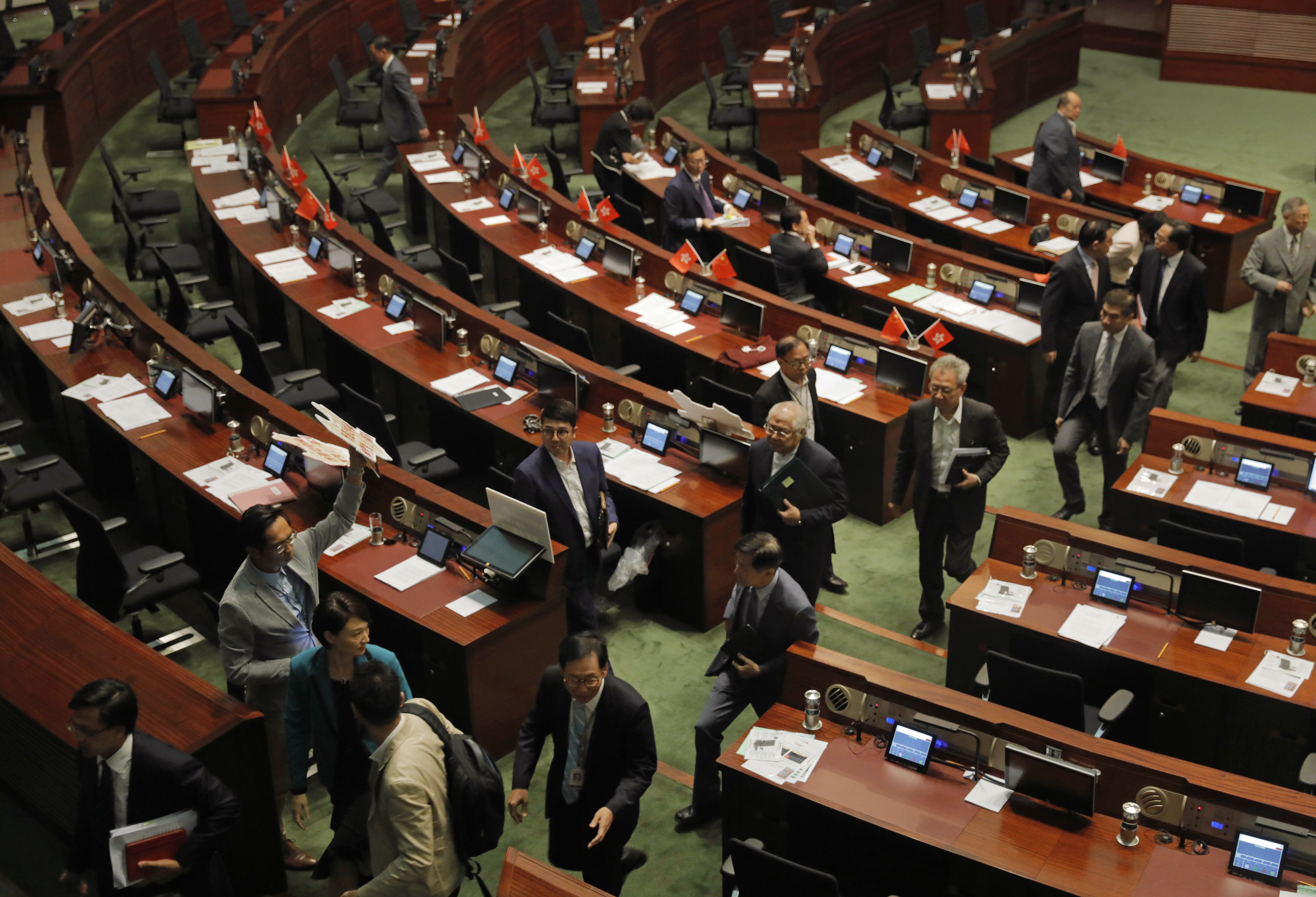
The pro-Beijing legislators staged a walkout on 19 October to force adjournment in order to block the Youngspiration legislators to retake the oaths.

- 12 October 2016: In the first meeting of the session, all members took their oaths while three members, Youngspiration's Baggio Leung and Yau Wai-ching and pan-democrat Edward Yiu who inserted their own words into the official script had their oaths rejected by the Legislative Council Secretariat, but 11 others - four localist and seven pan-democratic - added their own wording either before or after taking the oath and face no repercussions. Leung and Yau were criticised for pronouncing China as "Chee-na", the derogatory pronunciation used during the Second Sino-Japanese War and mispronouncing "People's Republic of China" as "people's re-fucking of Chee-na". After the oaths, the second most senior member Leung Yiu-chung of the Neighbourhood and Worker's Service Centre chaired the election of the President of the Legislative Council. To protest the Legislative Council secretariat's decision to disallow the three members to enter the chamber, Leung gave up the role amid calls from his colleagues to postpone the election due to the dispute over the British nationality of the pro-Beijing nominee Andrew Leung of the Business and Professionals Alliance for Hong Kong (BPA). Instead, Abraham Shek of the BPA who replaced Leung Yiu-chung pushed the election ahead. The pan-democrats and localists tore up their ballot papers and exited the meeting room before the vote. As a result, Andrew Leung received 38 votes against pro-democrat nominee James To's zero with three blank ballots.
- 19 October 2016: In the second meeting of the session when five members retook their oaths, the pro-Beijing camp staged a walkout to force the meeting to be adjourned for the first time in the session to protest the two Youngspiration legislators refusal to apologise for their "insulting" oaths last week before Yau and Leung, as well as Lau Siu-lai were to retake their oaths.
- 26 October 2016: In the third general meeting, Legislative Council President Andrew Leung adjourned the meeting after the three members, two Youngspiration legislators he disallowed from joining the meeting as he decided to delay their oath-retaking but were escorted by the pan-democracy legislators into the chamber, and Civic Passion's Cheng Chung-tai who shouted at Leung for his decision, refused to leave the chamber.

=== 2018–2019 ===
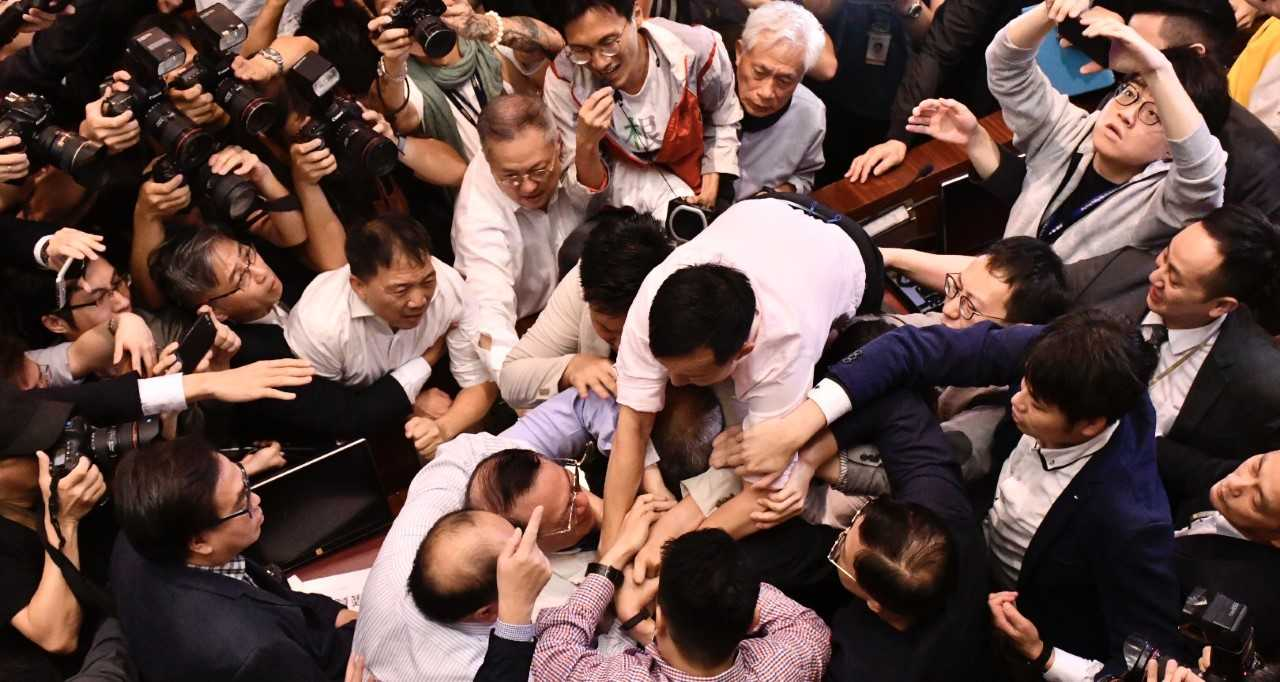
Members of two rival camps pushed and shoved each other in the Bills Committee meeting on 11 May 2019.

- 6 May 2019: After a House Committee meeting with a pro-Beijing majority, voted to issue a set of guidelines to replace the most senior member James To of the Democratic Party with the third senior member Abraham Shek of the Business and Professionals Alliance for Hong Kong to preside the Bills Committee of the controversial Fugitive Offenders and Mutual Legal Assistance in Criminal Matters Legislation (Amendment) Bill 2019 after To was accused of filibustering. To claimed that the move was illegitimate, adding that the secretariat had abused its power in issuing the circular without having any formal discussion. The pro-democracy legislators insisted to go ahead with the 6 May meeting as planned, which was eventually rescheduled by Shek with only 20 members present.
- 11 May 2019: A clash broke out as the pro-democracy and pro-Beijing camps called separate meetings of the Bills Committee of the controversial Fugitive Offenders and Mutual Legal Assistance in Criminal Matters Legislation (Amendment) Bill 2019 at the same room. A number of legislators fell to the ground as they pushed and shoved each other along the packed hallway. Gary Fan fell to the ground after standing on a table, and appearing to have fainted before he was sent to hospital.
- 12 June 2019: 12 June protest against the extradition bill outside the Legislative Council Complex. 40,000 protesters gathered outside the Government Headquarters attempted and successfully stalled the second reading of the bill, though the Police deployed numerous canisters of tear gas, rubber bullets and bean bag rounds to disperse the protesters. The government and the police characterised the protest as a "riot", marking it the most serious and intense conflict between the police and the protesters during the early stage of the 2019–20 Hong Kong protests.

Occupation of the main chamber by the protesters.

- 1 July 2019: Storming of the Legislative Council Complex where hundreds of protesters broke through the glass walls and metal doors and entered the building, ransacked and vandalised the interior with anti-government slogans. It is considered a watershed event in the 2019–20 protests.

=== 2019–2020 ===
- 18 May 2020: After a months-long filibustering by the pro-democrats on the election of the House Committee chair, President Andrew Leung invoked Article 92 of the Rule of Procedures to scrap the duties of Dennis Kwok, the former vice chair of the House Committee who had been presiding the meetings and replaced Chan Kin-por, chair of the Finance Committee who successfully presided the election after the pro-democrat legislators being expelled amid the clashes broke out between the pro-democrats and the security.
- 31 July 2020: Chief Executive Carrie Lam announced the postponement of 2020 general election for a whole year.
- 11 August 2020: NPCSC passed a decision to extend the incumbent 6th Legislative Council to extend its term for no less than one year, all members of Legco can stay but two decided to resign in protest to the extension.

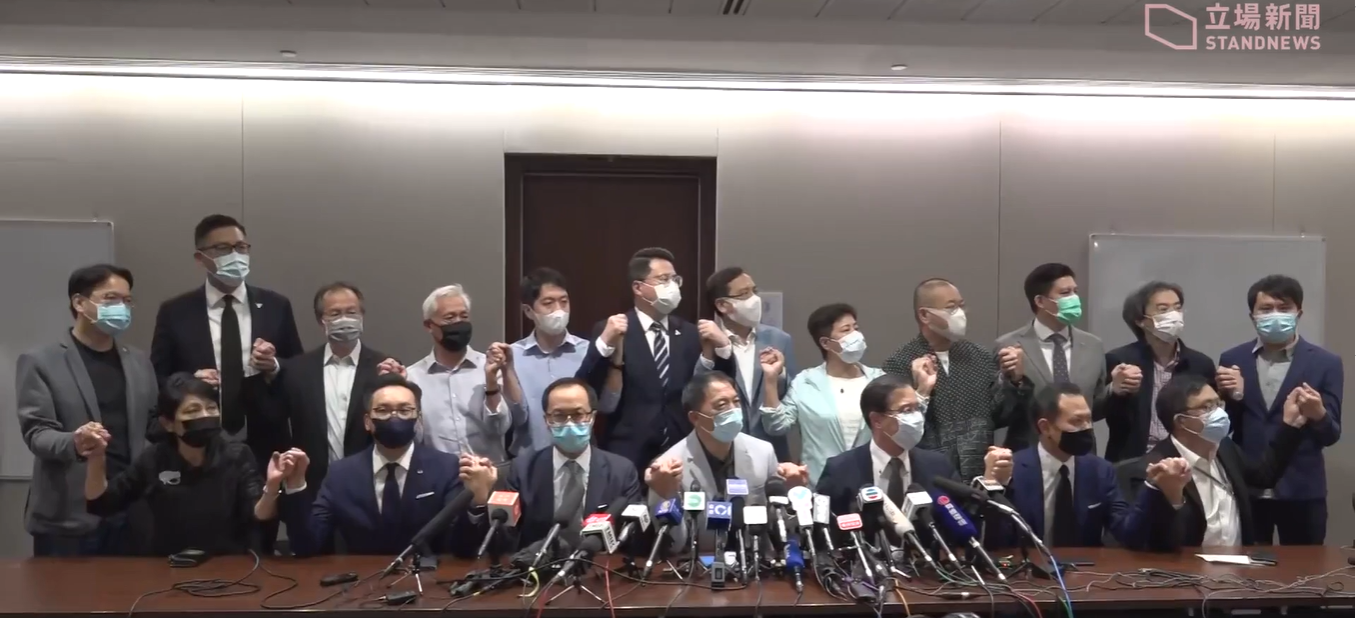
15 sitting pro-democracy legislators announced resignation en masse during a press conference with 4 former legislators

=== 2020–2021 ===
- 11 November 2020: NPCSC passed a decision which led to the disqualification of four sitting legislators by Hong Kong Government, 15 remaining pro-democracy legislators announced their resignation on the same day, with the effective dates ranging from 11 November to 1 December. The Legco has now no effective opposition.

== Major legislation ==
=== Enacted ===
- 14 June 2018: Guangzhou-Shenzhen-Hong Kong Express Rail Link (Co-location) Bill
- 12 June 2020: National Anthem Bill
- 12 May 2021: Public Offices (Candidacy and Taking Up Offices)(Miscellaneous Amendments) Bill 2021
- 27 May 2021: Improving Electoral System (Consolidated Amendments) Bill 2021

==== Electoral changes ====
After the passage of the National People's Congress Standing Committee (NPCSC) amendment to the Annex I and the Annex II of the Basic Law of Hong Kong on 30 March 2021 to drastically change the existing electoral system of Hong Kong, the Carrie Lam administration began to roll out the local electoral legislation. On 13 April after the Executive Council passed the Improving Electoral System (Consolidated Amendments) Bill 2021, the government unveiled the 765-page bill with more details of the future electoral system. A raft of changes to the Elections (Corrupt and Illegal Conduct) Ordinance was also included legislation to "regulate acts that manipulate or undermine elections", which would criminalise inciting people not to vote or cast blank or spoiled ballots. Violators could face up to three years in prison. The pro-Beijing-dominated Legislative Council voted on the 369 amendments tabled by the government, before passing the bill with 40-to-2 vote on 27 May 2021. The only two opposition legislators, Civic Passion's Cheng Chung-tai said that the overhaul would be a real touchstone of the principle of "Hong Kong people governing Hong Kong", while Pierre Chan for the Medical constituency said that the new electoral system was a "regression in democracy."

=== Proposed ===
- Fugitive Offenders and Mutual Legal Assistance in Criminal Matters Legislation (Amendment) Bill 2019

== Composition ==
=== Summary ===
Affiliation	Election	At dissolution
Democratic Alliance for the Betterment and Progress of Hong Kong	12	13
Business and Professionals Alliance for Hong Kong	7	8
Hong Kong Federation of Trade Unions	5	4
Liberal Party	4	4
New People's Party	3	2
Federation of Hong Kong and Kowloon Labour Unions	1	1
New Century Forum	1	1
Roundtable	0	1
Independent	7	7
Total for pro-Beijing camp	40	41
Democratic Party	7	0
Civic Party	6	0
Professional Commons	2	0
People Power	1	0
League of Social Democrats	1	0
Labour Party	1	0
Demosisto	1	0
Neighbourhood and Worker's Service Centre	1	0
Hong Kong Professional Teachers' Union	1	0
HK First	0	0#
Neo Democrats	0	0*
Independent	5	0
Total for pro-democracy camp	26	0
Civic Passion	1	0
Youngspiration	2	0
Total for localist camp	3	0
Non-aligned independent	1	1
Vacant	0	27
Total	70	42

* The Neo Democrats won one seat in the New Territories East by-election, but lost it after a court declared Gary Fan not duly elected.
# Resigned en masse with pro-democracy camp.

=== Change in membership ===
LegCo membership

26 August 2021 – 31 December 2021

1 December 2020 – 26 August 2021

13 November 2020 – 1 December 2020

11 November 2020 – 13 November 2020

30 September 2020 – 11 November 2020

18 September 2020 – 30 September 2020

1 June 2020 – 18 September 2020

7 September 2019 – 1 June 2020

22 December 2018 – 7 September 2019

26 November 2018 – 22 December 2018

12 March 2018 – 26 November 2018

14 July 2017 – 12 March 2018

10 April 2017 – 14 July 2017

15 November 2016 – 10 April 2017

1 October 2016 – 15 November 2016

Date		Affiliation				Total	Vacant
Date		Localist	Pro-democracy	Non-aligned	Pro-Beijing	Total	Vacant
	End of previous LegCo	1	26	1	42	70	0
I	Begin (1 October 2016)	6	23	1	40	70	0
I	7 October 2016	3	26	1	40	70	0
I	15 November 2016	1	26	1	40	68	2
I	14 July 2017	1	22	1	40	64	6
II	11 March 2018	1	24	1	42	68	2
III	25 November 2018	1	24	1	43	69	1
IV	17 December 2019	1	22	1	43	67	3
IV	1 June 2020	1	22	1	42	66	4
IV	18 September 2020	1	22	1	41	65	5
IV	30 September 2020	1	19	1	41	62	8
V	11 November 2020	1	15	1	41	58	12
V	13 November 2020	1	13	1	41	56	14
V	1 December 2020	1	0	1	41	43	27
V	26 August 2021	0	0	1	41	42	28

=== Graphical representation ===
Legislative Council membership at dissolution

Legislative Council division by caucus at dissolution

Legislative Council of Hong Kong seat composition by party at dissolution.

Non-aligned (1)

Independent (1)

Vacant (28)

Vacant (28)

Pro-Beijing (41)

Liberal (4)
Roundtable (1)
BPA (8)
New Forum (1)
NPP (2)
DAB (13)
FTU (5)
FLU (1)
Independent (7)

== Leadership ==
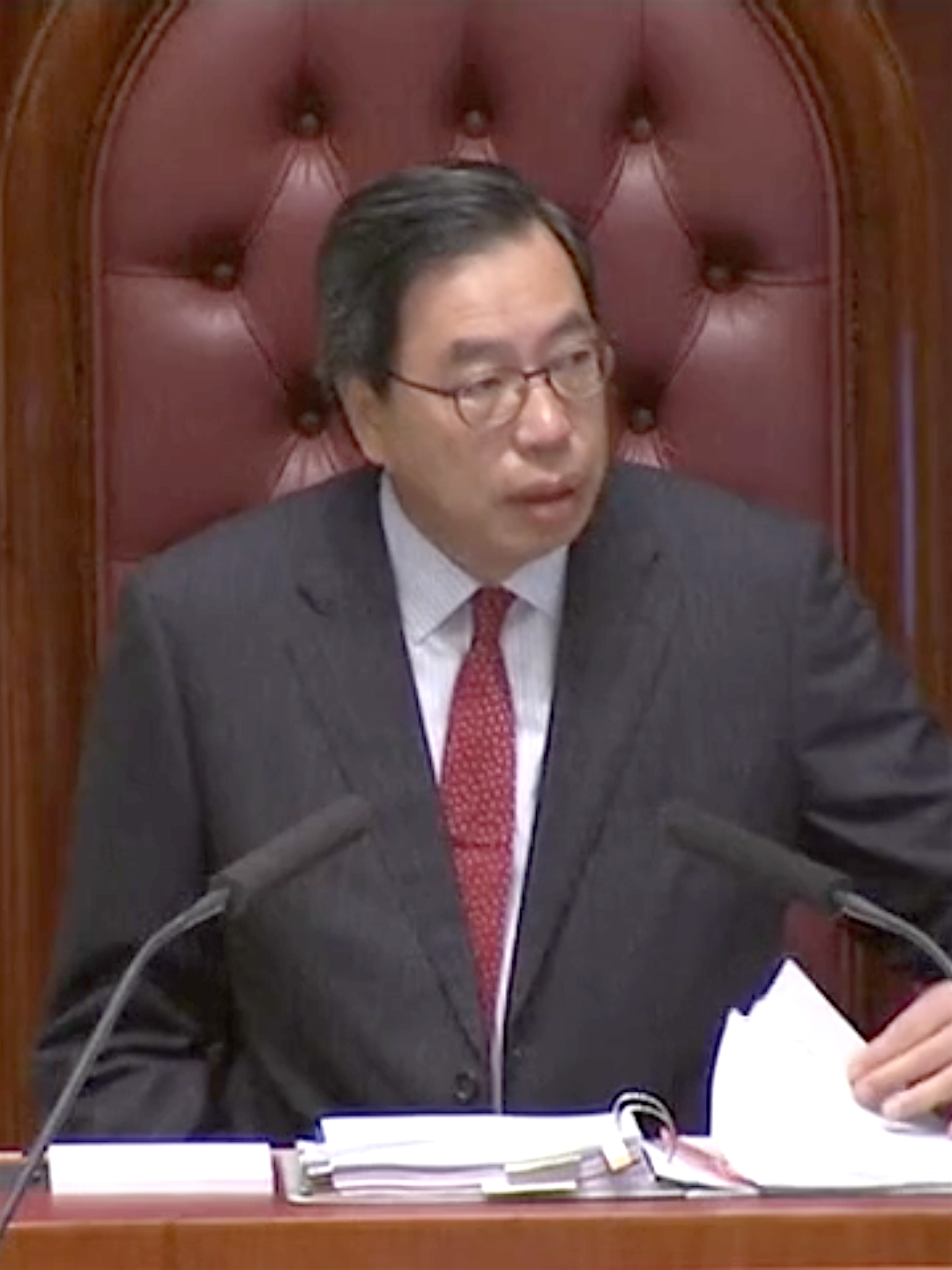
President Andrew Leung

- President: Andrew Leung (BPA)

=== Convenors ===
- Pro-Beijing camp: Martin Liao
- Pro-democracy camp:
  - James To (Democratic), 2016–2017
  - Charles Mok (PC), 2017–2018
  - Claudia Mo (HK First), 2018–2019
  - Tanya Chan (Civic), 2019–2020
  - Wu Chi-wai (Democratic), 1 October – 1 December 2020
  - Vacant, from 1 December 2020

== List of members ==
All members are listed by seniority according to the year of the beginning of consecutive service then the order of swearing in (i.e. the number of strokes in the traditional characters of names in Chinese per precedent) with the president of the Legislative Council being ranked first.

Members who did not serve throughout the term are italicised. Supplementary members elected in by-elections are listed below.

Key to changes since legislative election:

^{a} = change in party allegiance
^{b} = by-election
^{c} = did not take seat

Capacity	Constituency	Portrait	Elected Members	Elected Party	Political Alignment	Born	Occupation(s)	Assumed Office
President of the Legislative Council
FC	Industrial (First)		Andrew Leung	BPA	Pro-Beijing	24 February 1951	Merchant	2004
Other members
FC	District Council (Second)		James To (Note: Announced resignation on 12 November 2020 in protest to the 11 November disqualifications of four pro-democracy members.)	Democratic	Pro-democracy	11 March 1963	Solicitor	1998
FC	District Council (Second)		Leung Yiu-chung	NWSC	Pro-democracy	19 May 1953	Legislative Councillor	1998
FC	Real Estate and Construction		Abraham Shek	BPA	Pro-Beijing	24 June 1945	Company Director	2000
FC	Catering		Tommy Cheung	Liberal	Pro-Beijing	30 September 1949	Merchant; Legislative Councillor	2000
FC	Health Services		Joseph Lee	Independent	Pro-democracy	14 August 1959	Dean and Professor	2004
FC	Commercial (First)		Jeffrey Lam	BPA	Pro-Beijing	23 October 1951	Merchant	2004
FC	Import and Export		Wong Ting-kwong	DAB	Pro-Beijing	12 September 1949	Merchant	2004
FC	District Council (Second)		Starry Lee	DAB	Pro-Beijing	13 March 1974	Accountant; Legislative Councillor	2008
GC	New Territories East		Chan Hak-kan	DAB/NTAS	Pro-Beijing	24 April 1976	Legislative Councillor	2008
FC	Insurance		Chan Kin-por	Independent	Pro-Beijing	10 May 1954	Legislative Councillor; Chief Executive	2008
GC	Kowloon West		Priscilla Leung	BPA/KWND	Pro-Beijing	18 November 1960	Associate Professor; Barrister-at-law	2008
GC	Kowloon East		Wong Kwok-kin	FTU	Pro-Beijing	3 May 1952	Legislative Councillor	2008
GC	Hong Kong Island		Regina Ip	NPP	Pro-Beijing	24 August 1950	Chair of Savantas Policy Institute	2008
GC	Kowloon East		Paul Tse	Independent	Pro-Beijing	21 January 1959	Solicitor	2008
GC	New Territories East^{b}		Leung Kwok-hung (Note: Disqualified on 14 July 2017 over oath-taking controversy.)	LSD/AFA	Pro-democracy	18 January 1957	Legislative Councillor	2010 (b)
GC	Kowloon West		Claudia Mo (Note: Resigned on 12 November 2020 in protest to the 11 November disqualifications of four pro-democracy members, with effective on 13 November.)	Civic^{a}	Pro-democracy	27 March 1956	N/A	2012
GC	New Territories West		Michael Tien	NPP^{a}	Pro-Beijing	26 August 1950	Legislative Councillor; Entrepreneur	2012
FC	Agriculture and Fisheries		Steven Ho	DAB	Pro-Beijing	30 November 1979	Legislative Councillor	2012
FC	Transport		Frankie Yick	Liberal	Pro-Beijing	1953	Company Director	2012
GC	Kowloon East		Wu Chi-wai	Democratic	Pro-democracy	18 October 1962	Legislative Councillor; District Councillor	2012
FC	Tourism		Yiu Si-wing	Independent	Pro-Beijing	1955	Deputy chair of China Travel Service	2012
FC	Sports, Performing Arts, Culture and Publication		Ma Fung-kwok	New Forum	Pro-Beijing	22 July 1955	Managing Director	2012
FC	Information Technology		Charles Mok	Prof Commons	Pro-democracy	25 October 1964	Legislative Councillor	2012
GC	New Territories East		Chan Chi-chuen (Note: Resigned on 30 September 2020 in protest to the postponement of the 2020 Legislative Council election.)	People Power	Pro-democracy	16 April 1972	Legislative Councillor	2012
GC	New Territories West		Chan Han-pan	DAB/NTAS	Pro-Beijing	1975	Legislative Councillor; District Councillor	2012
GC	New Territories West		Leung Che-cheung	DAB/NTAS	Pro-Beijing	3 December 1957	Legislative Councillor; District Councillor	2012
FC	Accountancy		Kenneth Leung (Note: Disqualified on 11 November 2020 by the NPCSC decision for "endangering national security".)	Prof Commons	Pro-democracy	17 October 1962	Tax Consultant; Accountant	2012
GC	New Territories West		Alice Mak	FTU	Pro-Beijing	1 November 1971	Legislative Councillor; District Councillor	2012
GC	New Territories West		Kwok Ka-ki	Civic	Pro-democracy	20 July 1961	Urologist	2012
GC	Hong Kong Island		Kwok Wai-keung	FTU	Pro-Beijing	15 April 1978	Legislative Councillor; District Councillor	2012
FC	Legal		Dennis Kwok	Civic (Prof Commons)	Pro-democracy	15 April 1978	Barrister-at-law	2012
FC	Financial Services		Christopher Cheung	BPA	Pro-Beijing	2 May 1952	Securities Dealer	2012
GC	New Territories East		Fernando Cheung	Labour	Pro-democracy	23 February 1957	Lecturer	2012
GC	Kowloon West		Helena Wong	Democratic	Pro-democracy	21 March 1959	Lecturer	2012
FC	Education		Ip Kin-yuen	PTU	Pro-democracy	1961	Legislative Councillor; Teacher	2012
GC	New Territories East		Elizabeth Quat	DAB	Pro-Beijing	23 December 1966	Legislative Councillor	2012
FC	Commercial (Second)		Martin Liao	Independent	Pro-Beijing	1957	Barrister-at-law	2012
FC	Labour		Poon Siu-ping	FLU	Pro-Beijing	1957	Trade Union Staff	2012
GC	Kowloon West		Chiang Lai-wan	DAB	Pro-Beijing	16 May 1955	Legislative Councillor	2012
FC	Engineering		Lo Wai-kwok	BPA	Pro-Beijing	25 December 1953	Engineer	2012
FC	Textiles and Garment		Chung Kwok-pan	Liberal	Pro-Beijing	4 November 1963	Merchant	2012
GC	New Territories East		Alvin Yeung	Civic	Pro-democracy	5 June 1981	Barrister-at-law	2016 (b)
GC	New Territories West		Andrew Wan	Democratic	Pro-democracy	7 June 1969	Legislative Councillor	2016
GC	New Territories West		Eddie Chu	Independent	Localist; Pro-democracy	29 September 1977	Community Organiser	2016
FC	Industrial (Second)		Jimmy Ng	Independent^{a}	Pro-Beijing	17 June 1969	Company Director	2016
GC	New Territories West		Junius Ho	Independent	Pro-Beijing	4 June 1962	Solicitor	2016
FC	Labour		Ho Kai-ming (Note: Resigned on 1 June 2020 to take the place of Under Secretary for Labour and Welfare.)	FTU	Pro-Beijing	6 January 1985	Legislative Councillor; District Councillor	2016
GC	New Territories East		Lam Cheuk-ting	Democratic	Pro-democracy	13 June 1977	Legislative Councillor; District Councillor	2016
FC	District Council (Second)		Holden Chow	DAB	Pro-Beijing	7 June 1979	Solicitor	2016
FC	Wholesale and Retail		Shiu Ka-fai	Liberal	Pro-Beijing	22 April 1970	Company Director	2016
FC	Social Welfare		Shiu Ka-chun	Independent	Pro-democracy	3 June 1969	University Teacher	2016
GC	Kowloon East		Wilson Or	DAB	Pro-Beijing	9 July 1973	Legislative Councillor	2016
GC	New Territories East		Yung Hoi-yan	NPP	Pro-Beijing	7 June 1977	Barrister-at-law	2016
FC	Medical		Pierre Chan	Independent	Non-aligned	18 August 1967	Doctor	2016
FC	Finance		Chan Chun-ying	Independent	Pro-Beijing	1961	Advisor	2016
GC	Hong Kong Island		Tanya Chan (Note: Resigned on 30 September 2020 over health issue.)	Civic^{a}	Pro-democracy	14 September 1971	Barrister-at-law	2016
GC	Hong Kong Island		Cheung Kwok-kwan	DAB	Pro-Beijing	30 June 1974	Solicitor	2016
GC	Hong Kong Island		Hui Chi-fung	Democratic	Pro-democracy	8 June 1982	Legislative Councillor	2016
FC	Labour		Luk Chung-hung	FTU	Pro-Beijing	21 September 1978	Legislative Councillor; District Councillor	2016
FC	District Council (First)		Lau Kwok-fan	DAB	Pro-Beijing	28 June 1978	Legislative Councillor	2016
FC	Heung Yee Kuk		Kenneth Lau	BPA	Pro-Beijing	1966	Merchant	2016
GC	New Territories West		Cheng Chung-tai (Note: Disqualified on 26 August 2021 by the Candidate Eligibility Review Committee.)	Civic Passion	Localist	5 November 1983	Legislative Councillor	2016
FC	District Council (Second)		Kwong Chun-yu	Democratic	Pro-democracy	9 February 1983	Legislative Councillor	2016
GC	Kowloon East		Jeremy Tam	Civic	Pro-democracy	13 June 1975	Pilot	2016
GC	Hong Kong Island^{b}		Nathan Law	Demosisto	Localist; Pro-democracy	13 July 1993	Legislative Councillor	2016
FC	Architectural, Surveying, Planning and Landscape^{b}		Yiu Chung-yim	Independent	Pro-democracy	19 July 1964	Lecturer	2016
GC	Kowloon West^{b}		Lau Siu-lai	Independent	Localist; Pro-democracy	3 August 1976	Lecturer	2016
GC	New Territories East^{b}		Sixtus Leung ^{c} (Note: Disqualified on 15 November 2016 over oath-taking controversy.)	Youngspiration	Localist	7 August 1986	N/A	2016
GC	Kowloon West^{b}		Yau Wai-ching ^{c}	Youngspiration	Localist	6 May 1991	N/A	2016
Supplementary members
GC	New Territories East		Gary Fan (Note: Disqualified on 17 December 2019 as the result of the March 2018 Legislative Council by-election was ruled as invalid.)	Neo Democrats	Pro-democracy	30 October 1966	Legislative Councillor; District Councillor	2018 (b)
GC	Hong Kong Island		Au Nok-hin	Independent	Pro-democracy	18 June 1987	Legislative Councillor; District Councillor	2018 (b)
GC	Kowloon West		Vincent Cheng	DAB	Pro-Beijing	18 July 1979	Legislative Councillor; District Councillor	2018 (b)
FC	Architectural, Surveying, Planning and Landscape		Tony Tse	Independent	Pro-Beijing	27 October 1954	Surveyor	2018 (b)
GC	Kowloon West		Chan Hoi-yan (Note: Disqualified on 18 September 2020 as the result of the November 2018 Kowloon West by-election was ruled as invalid.)	Independent	Pro-Beijing	19 November 1977	Legislative Councillor	2018 (b)

== By-elections ==
- 11 March 2018, by-election for Hong Kong Island, Kowloon West, New Territories East and Architectural, Surveying, Planning and Landscape. Au Nok-hin (Independent democrat), Vincent Cheng (DAB), Gary Fan (Neo Democrats), and Tony Tse (pro-Beijing independent) were the winners in the respective constituencies.
- 25 November 2018 by-election for Kowloon West. Chan Hoi-yan (nonpartisan, supported by the pro-Beijing camp) was elected to replace independent democrat Lau Siu-lai after she was disqualified in the oath-taking controversy.

== Other changes ==
=== 2016 ===
- Claudia Mo (Kowloon West) announced her resignation from the Civic Party and served under the label of "HK First" on 14 November.

=== 2017 ===
- Michael Tien (New Territories West) announced his resignation from the New People's Party on 10 April and formed his own political group Roundtable.

=== 2018 ===
- Jimmy Ng (Industrial (Second)) joined the Business and Professionals Alliance for Hong Kong (BPA).

== Committees ==
Committee		2016–2017	2017–2018	2018–2019	2019–2020		2020–2021
House	C	Starry Lee (DAB)					
House	VC	Dennis Kwok (CP/PC)			Ma Fung-kwok (NCF)		
Parliamentary Liaison	C	Ip Kin-yuen (PTU)					V.
Parliamentary Liaison	VC	Kenneth Leung (PC)					V.
Finance	C	Chan Kin-por (Non.)					
Finance	VC	Michael Tien (NPP→RT)		Chan Chun-ying (Non.)			
Establishment	C	Regina Ip (NPP)			Holden Chow (DAB)		Regina Ip (NPP)
Establishment	VC	Alvin Yeung (CP)		Holden Chow (DAB)	Chan Chi-chuen (PP)	V.	Yiu Si-wing (Non.)
Public Works	C	Lo Wai-kwok (BPA)					Tony Tse (Non.)
Public Works	VC	Charles Mok (PC)					Lo Wai-kwok (BPA)
Public Accounts	C	Abraham Shek (BPA)					
Public Accounts	VC	Kenneth Leung (PC)					Paul Tse (Non.)
Members' Interests	C	Yiu Si-wing (Non.)					
Members' Interests	VC	Claudia Mo (CP→HKF)					Elizabeth Quat (DAB)
Rules of Procedure	C	Paul Tse (Non.)					
Rules of Procedure	VC	Kenneth Leung (PC)					Horace Cheung (DAB)
Panels
Administration of Justice and Legal Services	C	Priscilla Leung (BPA)					Horace Cheung (DAB)
Administration of Justice and Legal Services	VC	Dennis Kwok (CP/PC)					Martin Liao (Non.)
Commerce and Industry	C	Wu Chi-wai (DP)		Yiu Si-wing (Non.)	Jimmy Ng (BPA)		Felix Chung (LP)
Commerce and Industry	VC	Shiu Ka-fai (LP)		Alvin Yeung (CP)			Jimmy Ng (BPA)
Constitutional Affairs	C	Martin Liao (Non.)		Horace Cheung (DAB)			Holden Chow (DAB)
Constitutional Affairs	VC	Holden Chow (DAB)		Luk Chung-hung (FTU)	Kenneth Lau (BPA)		
Development	C	Tommy Cheung (LP)		Leung Che-cheung (DAB)	Tony Tse (Non.)		Lo Wai-kwok (BPA)
Development	VC	Kenneth Lau (BPA)			Luk Chung-hung (FTU)		Lau Kwok-fan (DAB)
Economic Development	C	Jeffrey Lam (BPA)		Felix Chung (LP)			Christopher Cheung (BPA)
Economic Development	VC	Alvin Yeung (CP)		Wu Chi-wai (DP)			Starry Lee (DAB)
Education	C	Ann Chiang (DAB)		Ip Kin-yuen (PTU)	Regina Ip (NPP)		Priscilla Leung (BPA)
Education	VC	Ip Kin-yuen (PTU)		Vincent Cheng (DAB)	Ip Kin-yuen (PTU)		Alice Mak (FTU)
Environmental Affairs	C	Tanya Chan (CP)		Junius Ho (Non.)			Vincent Cheng (DAB)
Environmental Affairs	VC	Junius Ho (Non.)		Hui Chi-fung(DP)	Steven Ho (DAB)		Paul Tse (Non.)
Financial Affairs	C	Christopher Cheung (BPA)	Kenneth Leung (PC)	Christopher Cheung (BPA)			Jeffrey Lam (BPA)
Financial Affairs	VC	Kenneth Leung (PC)	Christopher Cheung (BPA)	Kenneth Leung (PC)			Wong Ting-kwong (DAB)
Food Safety and Environmental Hygiene	C	Helena Wong (DP)	Steven Ho (DAB)	Kwok Ka-ki (CP)	Tommy Cheung (LP)		Steven Ho (DAB)
Food Safety and Environmental Hygiene	VC	Lau Kwok-fan (DAB)	Kwok Ka-ki (CP)	Shiu Ka-fai (LP)	Helena Wong (DP)		Shiu Ka-fai (LP)
Health Services	C	Joseph Lee (Non.)		Pierre Chan (Non.)	Ann Chiang (DAB)		Elizabeth Quat (DAB)
Health Services	VC	Pierre Chan (Non.)		Joseph Lee (Non.)	Chan Hoi-yan (Non.)	V.	Abraham Shek (BPA)
Home Affairs	C	Ma Fung-kwok (NCF)		Kwok Wai-keung (FTU)	Lau Kwok-fan (DAB)		Leung Che-cheung (DAB)
Home Affairs	VC	Jimmy Ng (Non.)	Yung Hoi-yan (NPP)	Au Nok-hin (Non.)	Chan Chi-chuen (PP)	V.	Wong Kwok-kin (FTU)
Housing	C	Alice Mak (FTU)		Wilson Or (DAB)			Tommy Cheung (LP)
Housing	VC	Jimmy Ng (Non.)	Yung Hoi-yan (NPP)	Au Nok-hin (Non.)	Chan Chi-chuen (PP)	V.	Wong Kwok-kin (FTU)
Information Technology and Broadcasting	C	Elizabeth Quat (DAB)	Charles Mok (PC)	Elizabeth Quat (DAB)	Charles Mok (PC)		Junius Ho (Non.)
Information Technology and Broadcasting	VC	Charles Mok (PC)	Elizabeth Quat (DAB)	Charles Mok (PC)	Elizabeth Quat (DAB)		Chan Kin-por (Non.)
Manpower	C	Leung Che-cheung (DAB)	Kwok Wai-keung (FTU)	Fernando Cheung (Lab)	Ho Kai-ming (FTU)	Vincent Cheng (DAB)	Luk Chung-hung (FTU)
Manpower	VC	Ho Kai-ming (FTU)	Fernando Cheung (Lab)	Ho Kai-ming (FTU)	Eddie Chu (Non.)	V.	Chan Chun-ying (Non.)
Public Service	C	Kwok Wai-keung (FTU)	Poon Siu-ping (FLU)	Gary Fan (ND)	Kwok Wai-keung (FTU)		
Public Service	VC	Jeremy Tam (CP)		Martin Liao (Non.)	Poon Siu-ping (FLU)		
Security	C	Chan Hak-kan (DAB)					
Security	VC	James To (DP)			Yung Hoi-yan (NPP)		
Transport	C	Chan Han-pan (DAB)	Frankie Yick (LP)	Chan Han-pan (DAB)	Frankie Yick (LP)		
Transport	VC	Kwok Ka-ki (CP)	Lam Cheuk-ting (DP)	Jeremy Tam (CP)	Chan Han-pan (DAB)		
Welfare Services	C	Chan Han-pan (DAB)	Frankie Yick (LP)	Chan Han-pan (DAB)	Frankie Yick (LP)		
Welfare Services	VC	Shiu Ka-chun (Non.)		Kwong Chun-yu (DP)			Ann Chiang (DAB)

== Secretariat ==
- Secretary General: Kenneth Chen

== See also ==
- 2016 Hong Kong legislative election
- 2016 President of the Hong Kong Legislative Council election
- 2018 Hong Kong by-election
- Hong Kong LegCo members' oath-taking controversy
