= Professionals Guild =

Professionals Guild 專業議政
- Convenor: Dennis Kwok (Civic)
- Founded: 26 September 2016
- Dissolved: 30 November 2020 (de facto)
- Ideology: Liberalism (Hong Kong)
- Regional affiliation: Pro-democracy camp
- Legislative Council (2017-20): 6 / 70

Website
- www.facebook.com/pg/professionalsguild/

The Professionals Guild (Chinese: 專業議政) was a pro-democracy parliamentary group in the Legislative Council of Hong Kong. All legislators in the group were elected through professional sectors in the Functional Constituencies. The group was active between the 2016 Legislative Council election and the mass-resignation of pro-democracy legislators in 2020.

== Overview ==
The Professionals Guild in Hong Kong was formed in 2016 by six pro-democracy functional constituency legislators after the 2016 Legislative Council election, which saw the pro-democrats increase their seats in the professional sectors. Membership of the group was not mutually exclusive against other political party membership. It became one of the four main pro-democracy parliamentary groups in the Legislative Council in the 2016-20 session, the others being the Democratic Party, Civic Party and Council Front formed by directly elected pro-democracy individuals.

At its peak, the group held seven seats in the legislature at its peak with Dennis Kwok of the Legal constituency, Kenneth Leung of Accountancy, Charles Mok of Information Technology, Edward Yiu of Architectural, Surveying, Planning and Landscape, Ip Kin-yuen of Education, Shiu Ka-chun of Social Welfare and Joseph Lee of Health Services. Edward Yiu was disqualified in 2017 due to the oath-taking controversy; he ran in a geographical constituency in consequent by-elections but lost.

One of the major tasks of the group was coordinating the pro-democracy "Democrats 300+" election campaign in the 2016 Election Committee Subsector elections. The victory in the Legislative Council functional constituencies in the 2016 election encouraged the pro-democrats to take a more progressive strategy in the professional sector, in which the pro-democrats traditionally had more advantages.

Dennis Kwok and Kenneth Leung were dismissed from the LegCo on 11 November 2020, following the Standing Committee of the National People's Congress decision that LegCo Members should be disqualified if they support Hong Kong independence, refuse to acknowledge China's sovereignty, ask foreign forces to interfere in the city's affairs or in other ways threaten national security. Kwok and Leung were amongst 4 LegCo members who were dismissed; all are considered moderates and have never publicly supported Hong Kong independence. Dennis Kwok said "If observing due process and fighting for democracy can lead to being disqualified, it [disqualification] will be my honour," Following this 15 other pro-democracy LegCo members have resigned between November and December 2020, including all remaining Professionals Guild LegCo members at the time.

== Legco representatives ==
The Professionals Guild held seven seats in LegCo at its peak in 2016-17.

Constituency	Member	Other political affiliation	First elected	Left office
Education	Ip Kin-yuen	PTU	2012 election	Resigned 1 Dec 2020
Legal	Dennis Kwok	Civic	2012 election	Disqualified 11 Nov 2020
Health Services	Joseph Lee	(none)	2004 election	Resigned 1 Dec 2020
Accountancy	Kenneth Leung	Professional Commons	2012 election	Disqualified 11 Nov 2020
Information Technology	Charles Mok	Professional Commons	2012 election	Resigned 1 Dec 2020
Social Welfare	Shiu Ka-chun	(none)	2016 election	Resigned 1 Dec 2020
Architectural, Surveying, Planning and Landscape	Edward Yiu	(none)	2016 election	Disqualified in 2017

== See also ==
- Professional Commons
- Professional Forum
