= 2020 Hong Kong Legislative Council mass resignations =

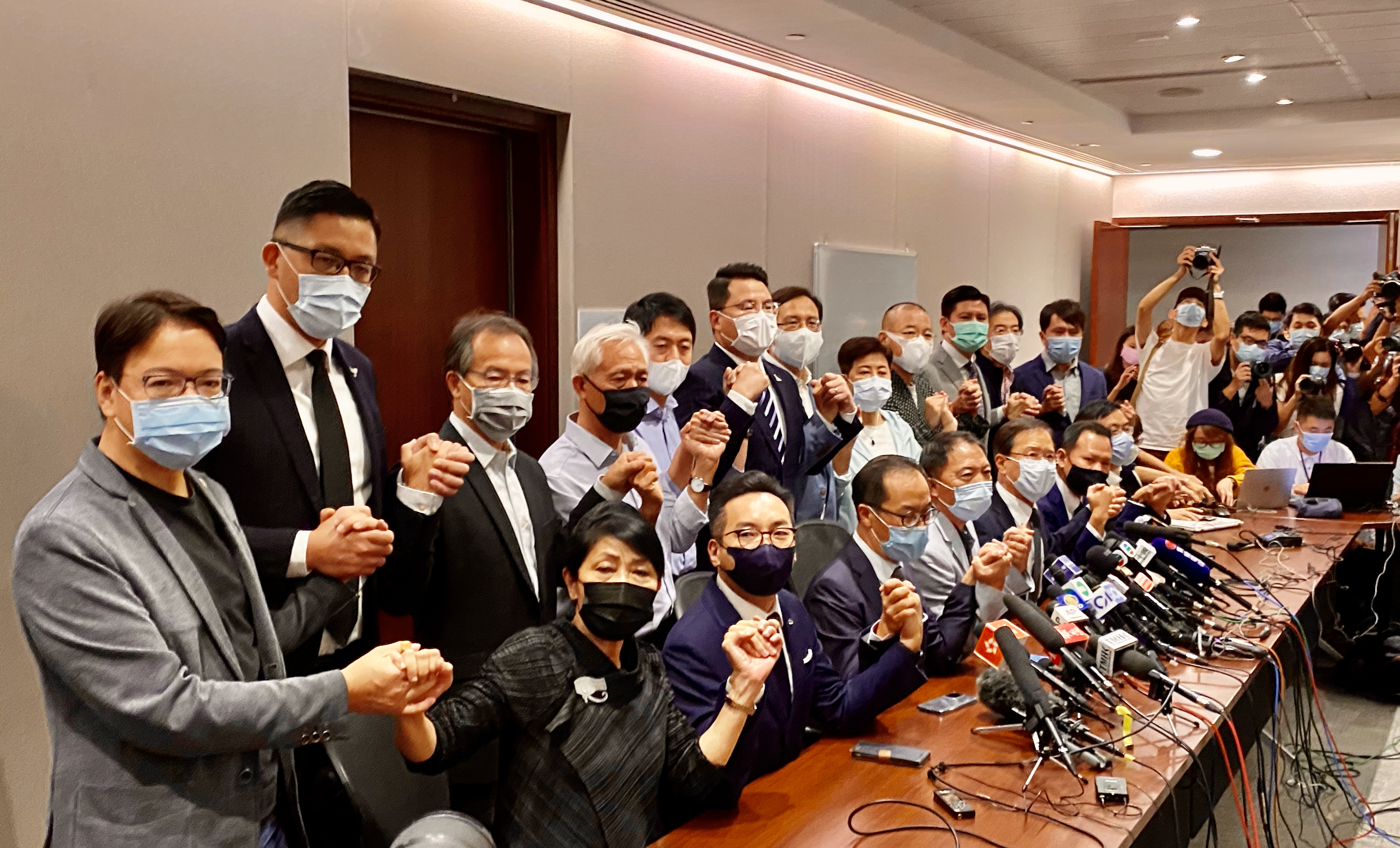
All 19 pro-democracy legislators announced their resignation en masse in response to the decision by the National People's Congress Standing Committee to disqualify four legislators.

On 11 November 2020, 15 Hong Kong pro-democracy members of the Legislative Council announced their resignations in protest against the decision of the National People's Congress Standing Committee (NPCSC) which bars Legislative Council members from supporting Hong Kong independence, refusing to recognise Beijing's sovereignty over Hong Kong, seeking help from "foreign countries or foreign forces to interfere in the affairs of the region" or committing "other acts that endanger national security" that resulted in the disqualification of pro-democracy legislators Alvin Yeung, Dennis Kwok, Kwok Ka-ki and Kenneth Leung. In July 2020, the four had been barred from running in the subsequently postponed Legislative Council election originally scheduled for September 2020. The resignation en masse left the Legislative Council membership dwindled to 43 out of the total number of 70 seats, with virtually no opposition for the first time since the 1997 handover.

== Background ==
=== Oath taking controversy and by-election overturns ===
The first instance of unseating members from the Legislative Council for political reasons occurred in November 2016, triggered by the oath-taking controversy of several pro-democracy and localist camp members. On 7 November 2016, the National People's Congress Standing Committee (NPCSC) controversially interpreted Article 104 of the Basic Law of Hong Kong to "clarify" the requirements that the legislators need to swear allegiance to Hong Kong as part of China when they take office, stating that a person "who intentionally reads out words which do not accord with the wording of the oath prescribed by law, or takes the oath in a manner which is not sincere or not solemn" should be barred from taking their public office and cannot retake the oath. As a result, two localist members Yau Wai-ching and Baggio Leung of Youngspiration were unseated by the court. On 14 July 2017, four more pro-democracy legislators – Leung Kwok-hung, Nathan Law, Yiu Chung-yim and Lau Siu-lai were unseated by the court.

The vacancies left by the six disqualified members were filled in by the March and November by-elections in 2018. However the disqualifications of localist candidates Agnes Chow and Ventus Lau by returning officers, which had been based on their stances on allegiance and independence before the March by-election, was successfully challenged in court, on the basis of the disqualified candidates not having been given any reasonable opportunity to respond to the returning officers' questions which led to their ineligibility. Similarly, the election result of the November by-election was overturned by the court regarding the returning officer's decision to disqualify Lau Siu-lai. As a result, two pro-democrats Au Nok-hin and Gary Fan who were elected in March 2018 and pro-Beijing independent Chan Hoi-yan in November 2018 were unseated.

=== Candidates' disqualification and election postponement ===
Another wave of disqualifications of pro-democracy candidates in the 2020 Legislative Council general election by the returning officers occurred in the end of the nomination period in July. 12 pro-democrats including four incumbent Legislative Council members – Alvin Yeung, Kwok Ka-ki, Dennis Kwok and Kenneth Leung – were also disqualified on the grounds of either expressing an objection in principle to the newly imposed national security law, refusing to recognise the exercise of the sovereignty by the People's Republic of China over Hong Kong or soliciting foreign interference into Hong Kong affairs.

Within a day, Chief Executive Carrie Lam announced on 31 July that she would invoke the Emergency Regulations Ordinance to postpone the September general election for a whole year citing the recent resurgence of the COVID-19 cases. For the lacuna of the Legislative Council arising from the postponement, Carrie Lam sought for support and guidance by the central government. Pro-democracy legislators slammed the government for using the coronavirus outbreak as an excuse to delay the vote to avoid a potential repeating defeat in the election after the 2019 District Council electoral landslide. They warned that doing so would "trigger a constitutional crisis in the city." The pro-democrats also compared the situation to the eve of the 1997 handover when the Beijing government installed the pro-Beijing-dominated Provisional Legislative Council to counter the fully elected colonial Legislative Council. Pro-democrat legislators refused to join the provisional legislature on the grounds it was extra-constitutional and not democratically elected.

On 11 August, the National People Congress Standing Committee (NPCSC) unanimously passed a decision to extend the incumbent 6th Legislative Council to extend its term for no less than one year, although it did not explain the legal basis for the extension which was in contradiction to the term limit stipulated in Article 69 of the Basic Law, neither did it mention the status of the four incumbent legislators who were barred from running by the returning officers in July. The NPCSC decision sparked an internal strife within the pro-democracy camp on whether to stay in the Legislative Council for the extended term. Most of the fresh face candidates who had won the July pro-democracy primaries argued against staying in the legislature as they deemed the NPCSC decision to be unconstitutional, while most traditional pro-democrat incumbents believed in the advantages of staying on the legislature to oppose the government bills, and receiving public funding and resources. The factions agreed on taking collective action according to a citywide survey, which showed that 47.1 per cent of the respondents voted to stay, while 45.8 per cent voted for leave. Abiding by the results, seven Democratic Party, four Civic Party and five Professionals Guild legislators, as well as Claudia Mo (HK First), Leung Yiu-chung (NWSC), and Fernando Cheung (Labour) decided to stay. Tanya Chan of the Civic Party announced that she would leave and resign from the party for health and family reasons. Belonging to the more radical wing of the camp, Eddie Chu and Raymond Chan had also stated that they would leave the legislature.

==== Resigned effective on 30 September 2020 ====
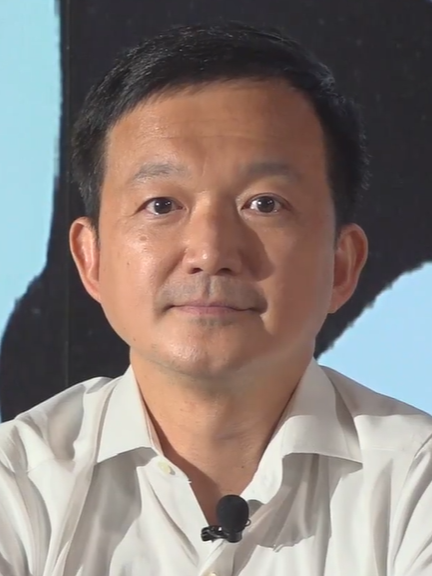
Raymond Chan (People Power)
for New Territories East

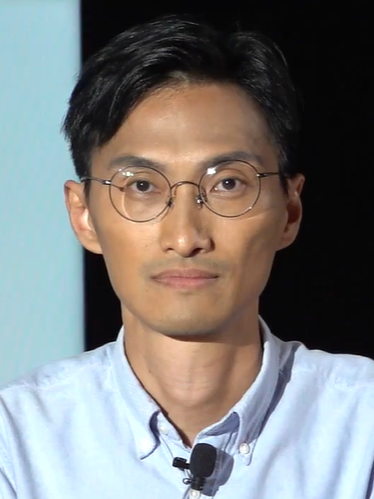
Eddie Chu (Nonpartisan)
for New Territories West

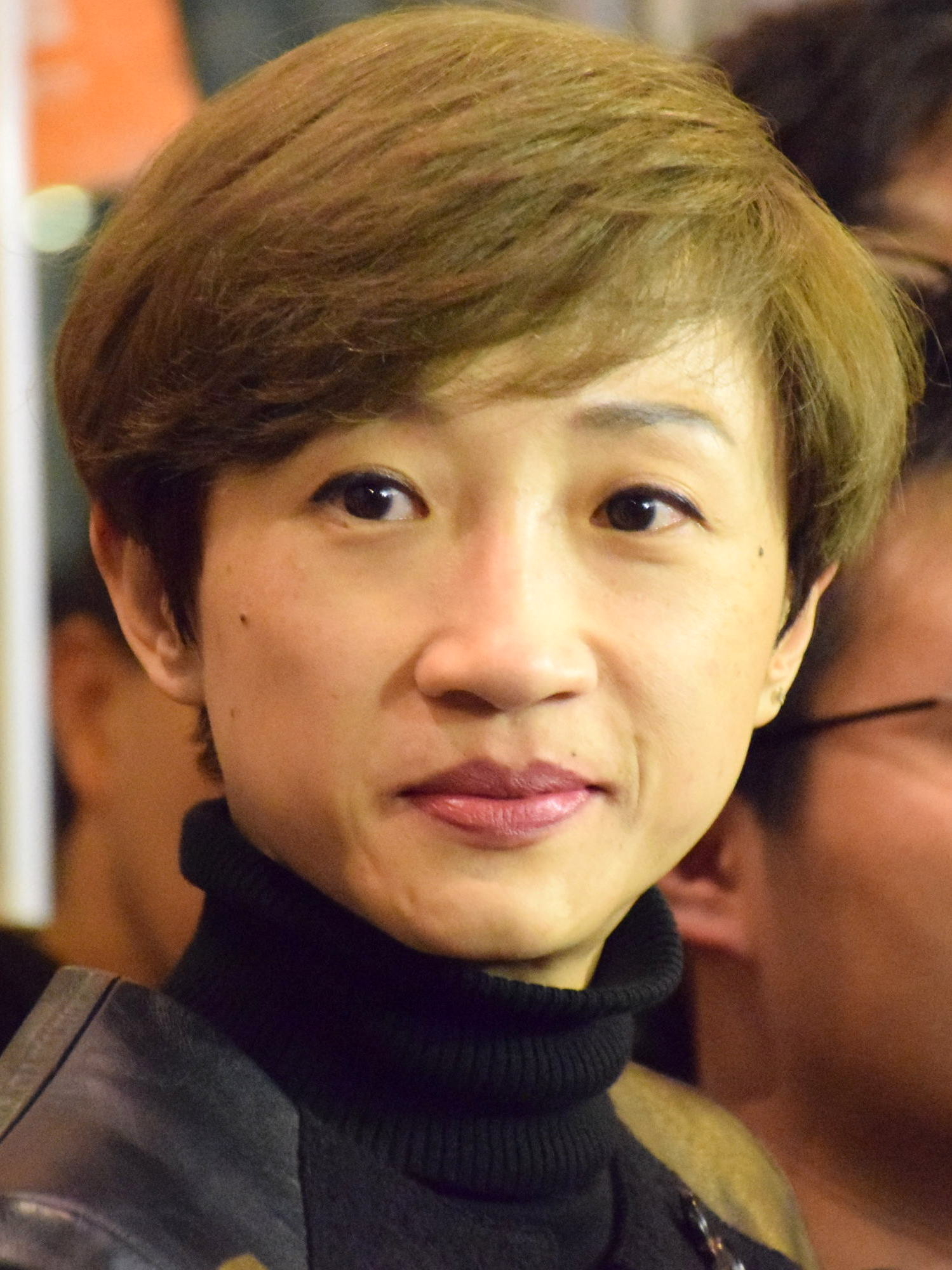
Tanya Chan (Civic)
for Hong Kong Island

== November NPCSC decision and resignations ==
On 11 November 2020, the National People Congress Standing Committee (NPCSC) ruled in a decision which bars Legislative Council members from supporting Hong Kong independence, refusing to recognise Beijing's sovereignty over Hong Kong, seeking help from "foreign countries or foreign forces to interfere in the affairs of the region" or committing "other acts that endanger national security", targeting the four sitting legislators, Alvin Yeung, Kwok Ka-ki, Dennis Kwok and Kenneth Leung whose candidacies had been invalidated by the returning officers earlier in July. Following the decision, Chief Executive Carrie Lam explained that it was the Hong Kong government who had requested Beijing's intervention in the matter, contradicting her earlier pledge not to disqualify the four legislators. On the same day, the SAR administration announced that four legislators had been stripped of their seats with immediate effect. In response to the disqualification, Dennis Kwok said that "if observing due process and protecting systems...and fighting for democracy and human rights would lead to the consequences of being disqualified, it would be my honour. I say the same today...it’s been my honour to serve."

In response, the 15 remaining pro-democracy legislators announced they would resign en masse in solidarity with the disqualified members. "We can no longer tell the world that we still have 'One Country, Two Systems', this declares its official death," said Democratic Party chairman Wu Chi-wai. "In view of our colleagues who were ousted today, all democrats decide to stand with them and resign en masse. The move will not frustrate us, as we know democracy will not be achieved overnight. The road to democracy is especially long when confronting an authoritarian regime. But we will not be defeated by pressure and oppression. We will find a new way." The resignation en masse would leave the Legislative Council without virtual opposition for the first time since the handover. Cheng Chung-tai of localist Civic Passion and non-aligned independent Pierre Chan of the Medical constituency said they would remain in the Legislative Council, becoming the minority among 41 pro-Beijing members.

=== Disqualified effective on 11 November 2020 ===
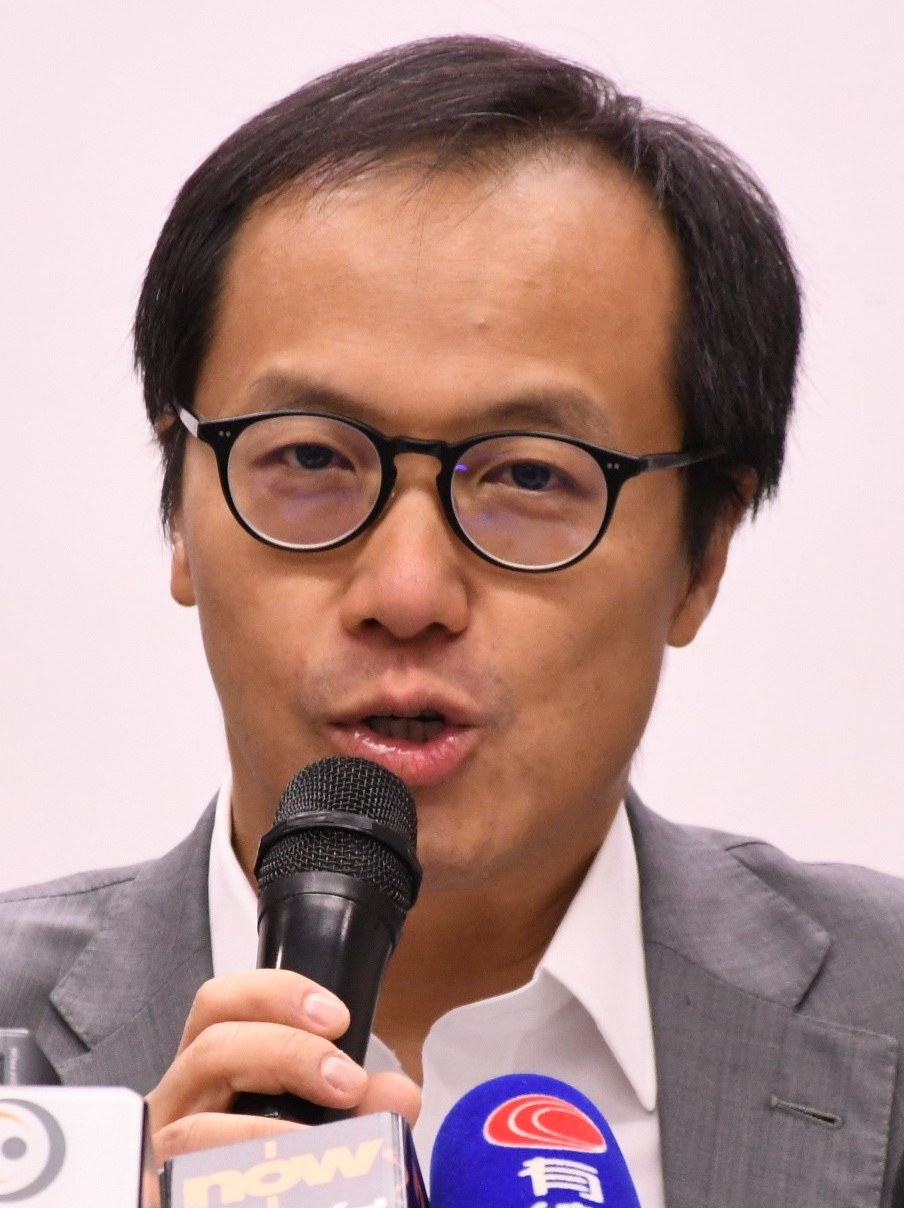
Kenneth Leung (Professional Commons)
for Accountancy

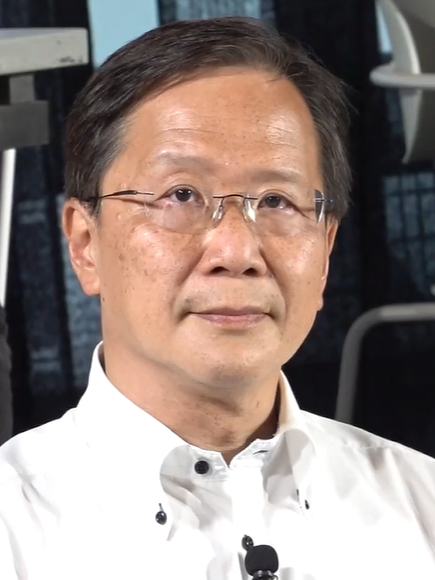
Kwok Ka-ki (Civic)
for New Territories West

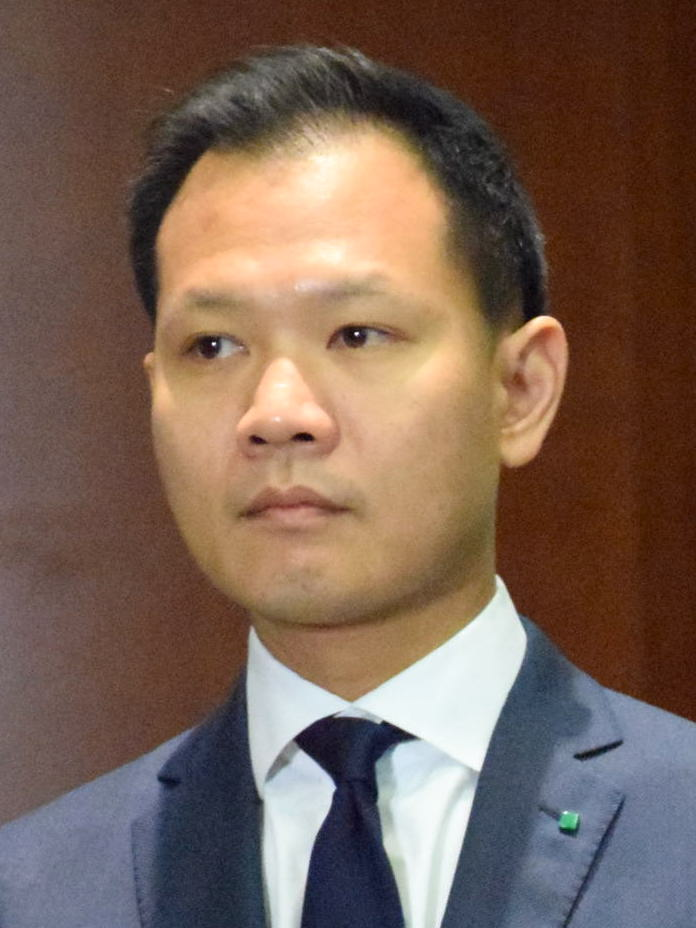
Dennis Kwok (Civic/PC)
for Legal

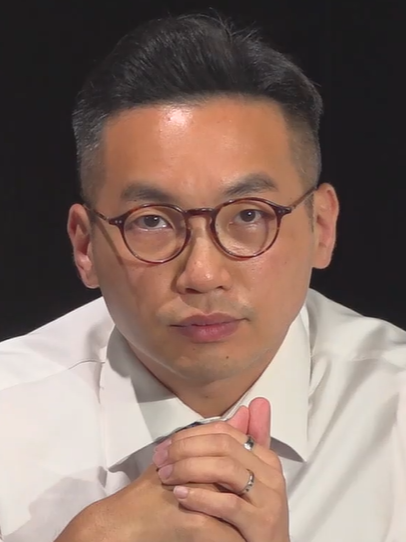
Alvin Yeung (Civic)
for New Territories East

=== Resigned effective on 12 November 2020 ===
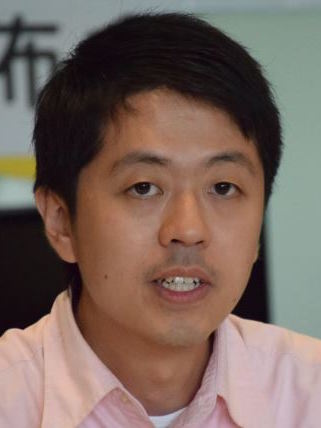
Hui Chi-fung (Democratic)
for Hong Kong Island

=== Resigned effective on 13 November 2020 ===
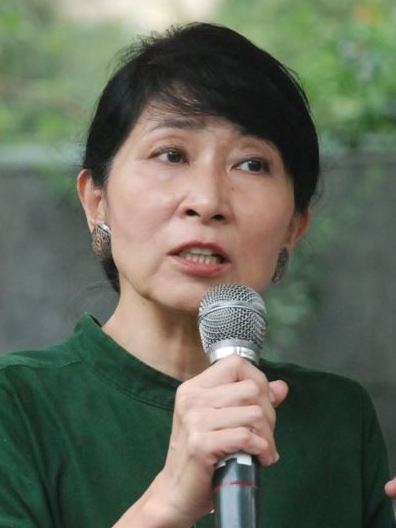
Claudia Mo (HK First)
for Kowloon West

=== Resigned effective on 1 December 2020 ===
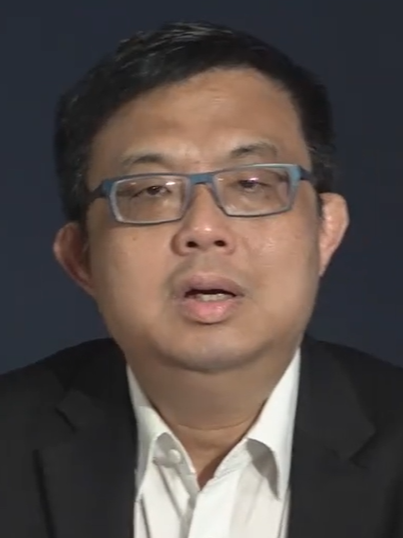
James To (Democratic)
for District Council (Second)

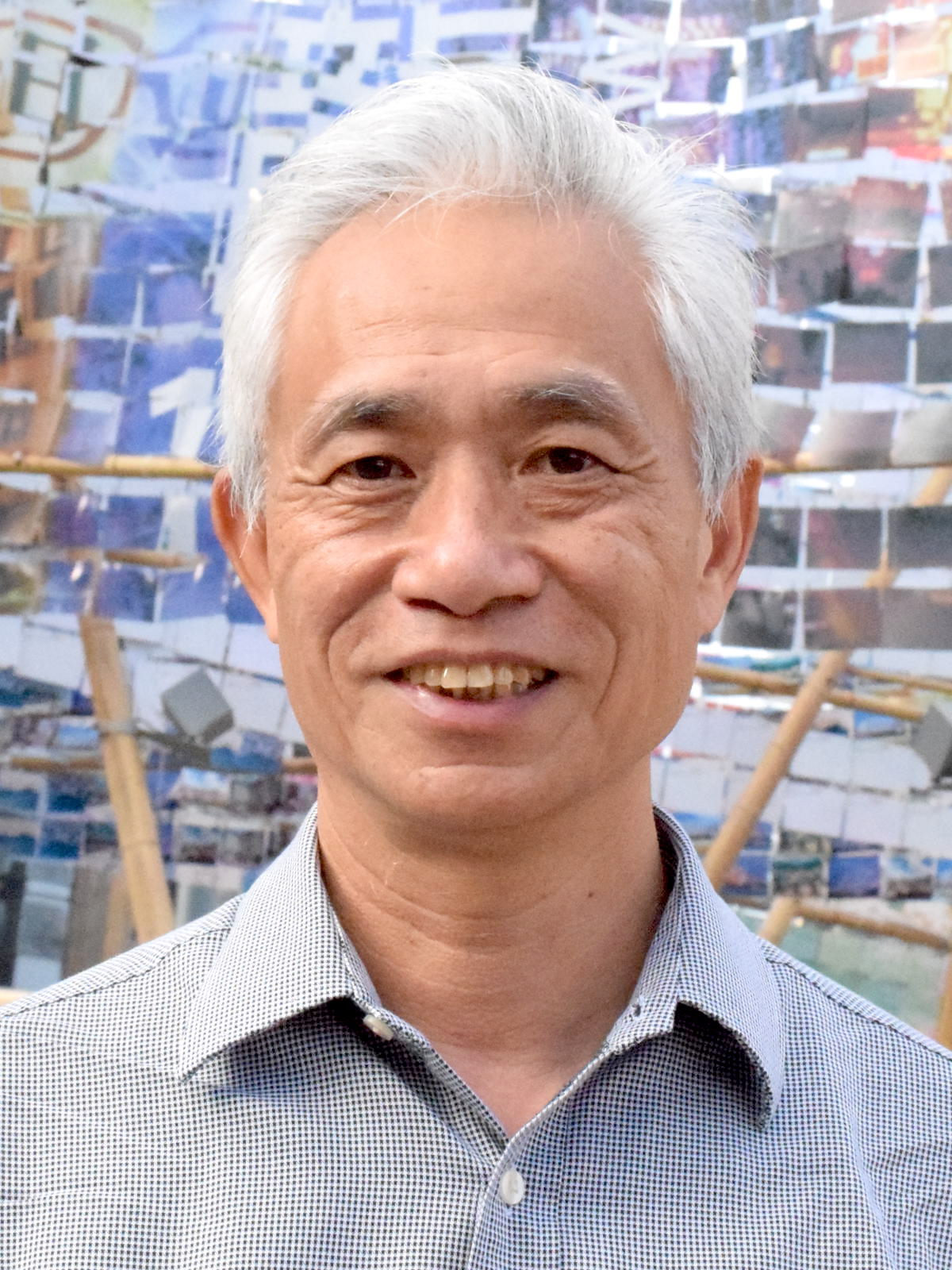
Leung Yiu-chung (NWSC)
for District Council (Second)

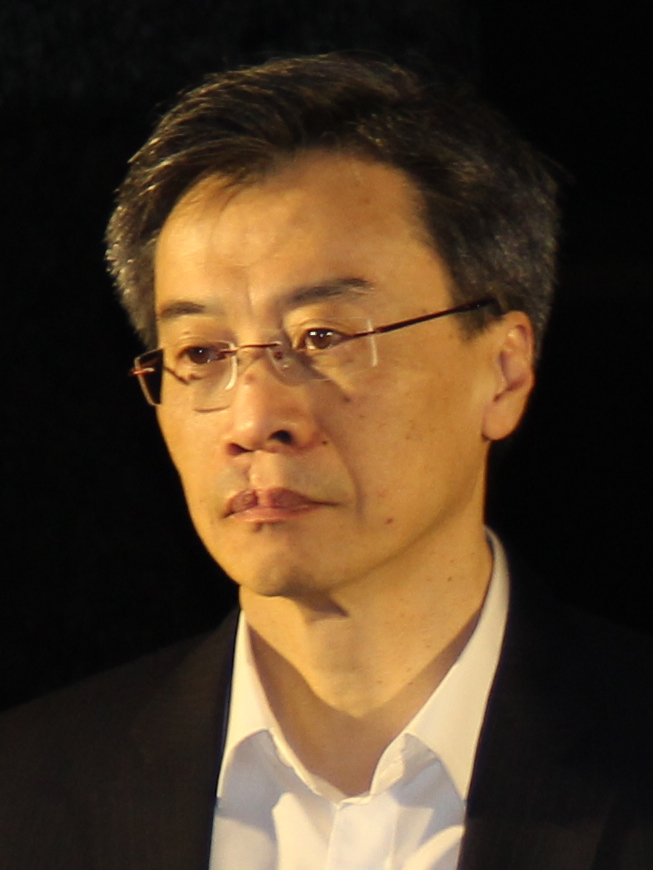
Joseph Lee (Nonpartisan)
for Health Services

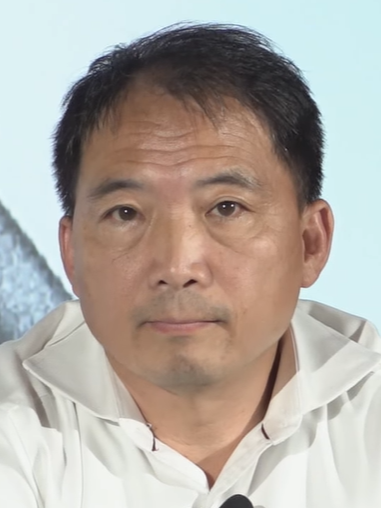
Wu Chi-wai (Democratic)
for Kowloon East

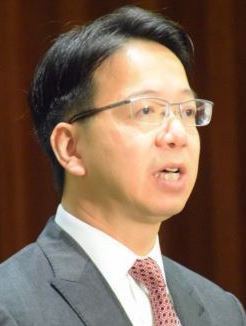
Charles Mok (Professional Commons)
for Information Technology

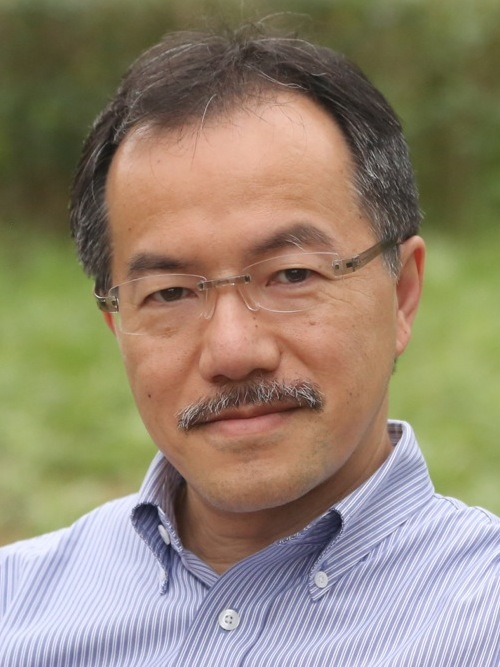
Fernando Cheung (Labour)
for New Territories East

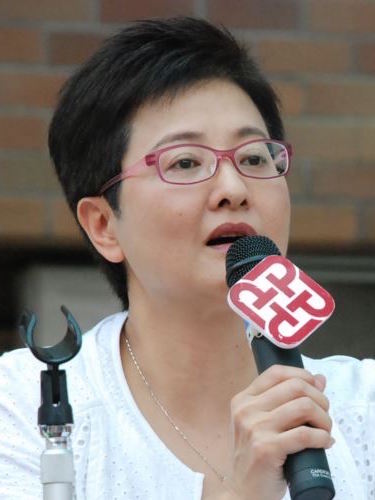
Helena Wong (Democratic)
for Kowloon West

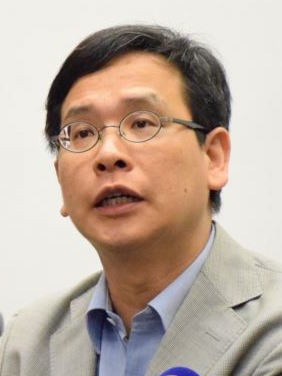
Ip Kin-yuen (PTU)
for Education

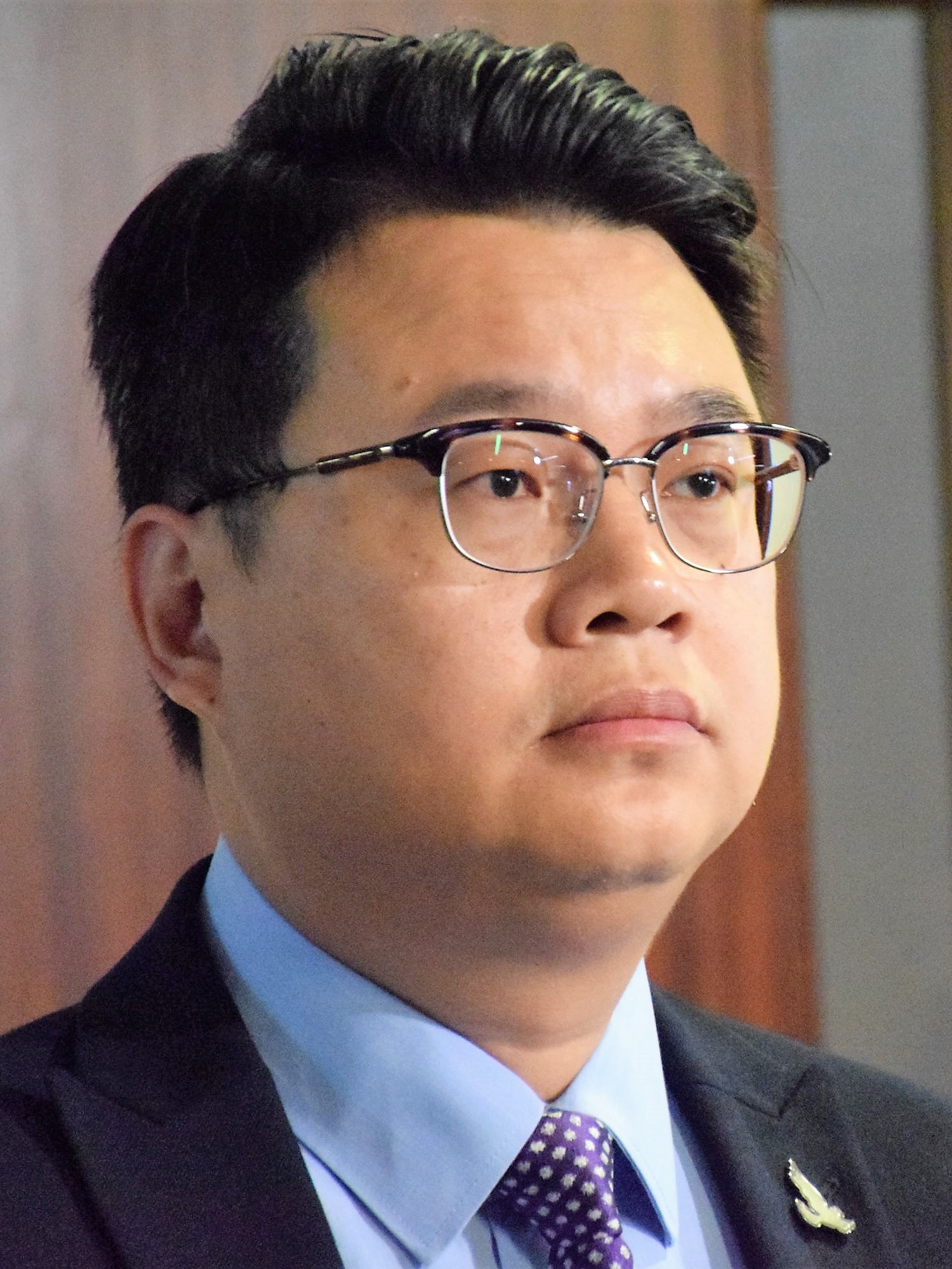
Andrew Wan (Democratic)
for New Territories West

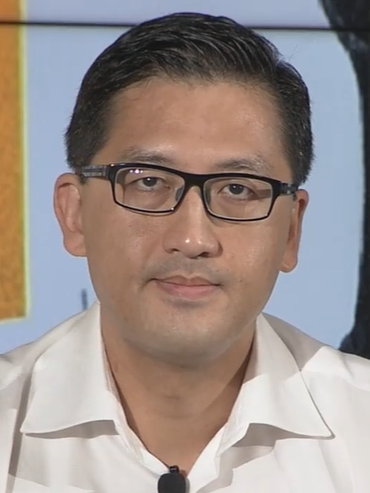
Lam Cheuk-ting (Democratic)
for New Territories East

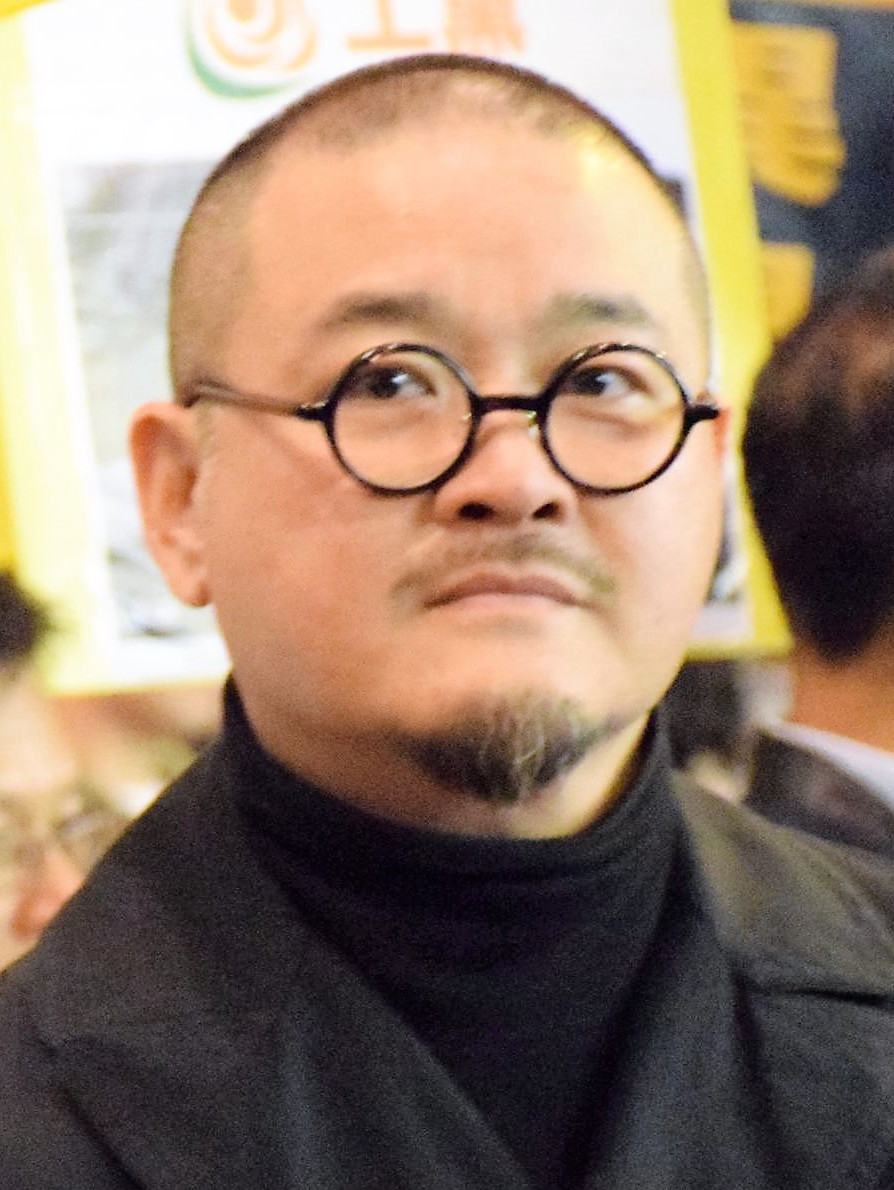
Shiu Ka-chun (Nonpartisan)
for Social Welfare

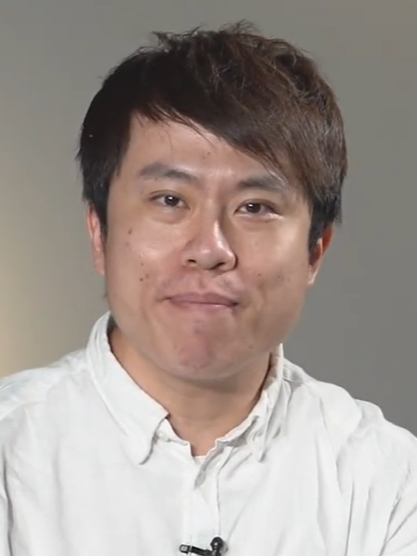
Roy Kwong (Democratic)
for District Council (Second)

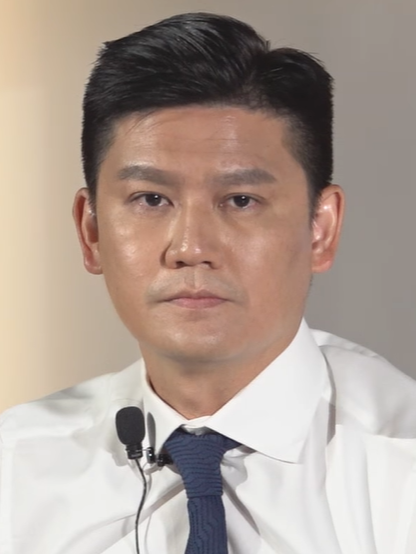
Jeremy Tam (Civic)
for Kowloon East

== See also ==
- 6th Legislative Council of Hong Kong
- 2019–20 Hong Kong protests
- 2020 detainment of Hong Kong residents at sea by China
- Next Digital raid and arrests
- January 2021 arrests of Hong Kong pro-democracy activists
