= Wah Lai (constituency) =

Hong Kong constituency

- Elected constituency for the Kwai Tsing District Council
- Boundary of Wah Lai in Kwai Tsing District
- District: Kwai Tsing
- Legislative Council constituency: New Territories South West
- Population: 16,580 (2019)
- Electorate: 9,687 (2019)

Current constituency
- Created: 2007
- Number of members: One
- Member: vacant

Wah Lai (Chinese: 華麗) is one of the 31 constituencies of the Kwai Tsing District, returning one member to the Kwai Tsing District Council every four years. It was first created in 2007.

Loosely based on Lai Yiu Estate, Wah Yuen Chuen and Wonderland Villas in Lai King, the constituency has an estimated population of 16,580 as of 2019.

== Councillors represented ==
Election	Member	Party
2007	Wong Yiu-chung	Independent
2012	Wong Yiu-chung	BPA
2019	Sin Chung-kai→vacant	Democratic

== Election results ==
=== 2010s ===
Kwai Tsing District Council Election, 2019: Wah Lai
Party	Candidate	Votes	%	±%
Democratic	Sin Chung-kai	3,469	51.93	
BPA	Wong Yiu-chung	2,998	44.88	−23.83
Nonpartisan	Tam Yam-chi	152	2.28	
Nonpartisan	Yuen Kowk-ki	44	0.66	
Nonpartisan	Christabel Donna Tai Pui-shan	17	0.25	
Majority		471	7.05	
Turnout		6,706	69.26	
Democratic gain from BPA		Swing		

Kwai Tsing District Council Election, 2015: Wah Lai
Party	Candidate	Votes	%	±%
BPA	Wong Yiu-chung	2,130	68.71	
Independent	Yuen Kowk-ki	707	22.81	
Independent	Christabel Donna Tai Pui-shan	263	8.48	
Majority		1,423	45.90	
Turnout		3,100	34.32	
BPA hold		Swing		

Kwai Tsing District Council Election, 2011: Wah Lai
Party	Candidate	Votes	%	±%
Independent	Wong Yiu-chung	uncontested		
Independent hold		Swing		

=== 2000s ===
Kwai Tsing District Council Election, 2007: Wah Lai
Party	Candidate	Votes	%	±%
Independent	Wong Yiu-chung	1,776	76.98	
Independent	Yuen Kwok-li	304	13.18	
LYECA	Carl Ching Lok-suen	277	12.01	
Majority		1,472	63.80	
Nonpartisan win (new seat)				
