= Philip Bowring =

English journalist

Philip Arthur Bowring (born 22 November 1942) is an English journalist and historian who was business editor, deputy editor and editor of the Asian news magazine the Far Eastern Economic Review for 17 years between 1973 and 1992.

== Early life ==
Bowring was born in Southwell, Nottinghamshire, England, to Margaret Grace Brook (1917–1999) and Edgar Rennie Harvey Bowring (1915–2001), a solicitor and insurance professional. His 3rd great-grandfather Nathaniel's brother's grandson was Sir John Bowring, an early governor of Hong Kong.

Bowring received a Catholic school education culminating in a time at Ampleforth College, Yorkshire. He studied history at St Catharine's College, Cambridge, graduating 1963. Under a Goldsmiths Company scholarship, he then studied as a research student at the University of Khartoum, Sudan, for a year.

Bowring returned to the UK and began a career in journalism which culminated in two years at the Investors Chronicle where he developed a taste for investigative financial reporting.

== Asia ==
Bowring's first step towards Asia was in 1972, to take up an opportunity with an about-to-be-launched Sydney business magazine Finance Week, what turned out to be a short-lived Financial Times-News Ltd partnership. The next year, he accepted an offer to move to Hong Kong to become business editor of the Far Eastern Economic Review and part-time correspondent for the Financial Times. Bowring's first stint at the Review lasted five years, ending in conflict with its editor Derek Davies, after which he passed the next two years at the Asian Wall Street Journal, briefly, and the Financial Times. He returned to his Review career in 1980 as deputy editor at Davies' invitation and rose to editor in 1988, the role he held until 1992.

For the next 19 years, Bowring wrote regular columns for the International Herald Tribune, and also for the South China Morning Post from 1995 to 2017. He co-founded the Asia Sentinel news website in 2006, to which he remains a regular contributor.

== Lee Kuan Yew ==
In 2010, former Prime Minister of Singapore Lee Kuan Yew, together with his son Lee Hsien Loong, and Goh Chok Tong, threatened legal action against The New York Times Company, which owned the International Herald Tribune, regarding an Op-Ed piece titled "All in the Family" of 15 February 2010 by Bowring, then a freelance columnist for the newspaper. After an apology by the newspaper that readers of the article might have "infer[red] that the younger Lee did not achieve his position through merit", the New York Times Company and Bowring also agreed to pay S$60,000 to Lee Hsien Loong, S$50,000 to Lee and S$50,000 to Lee Hsien Loong and Goh Chok Tong, in addition to legal costs.

The case stemmed from a 1994 settlement between the three Singaporean leaders and the paper about an article, also by Bowring, that referred to "dynastic politics" in East Asian countries, including Singapore. In that 1994 settlement, Bowring agreed not to say or imply that the younger Lee had attained his position through nepotism by his father Lee Kuan Yew. In response, media-rights watchdog Reporters Without Borders wrote an open letter to urge Lee and other top officials of the Singapore government to stop taking "libel actions" against journalists.

Bowring passed over without comment the accession of Lee Jr in the long and detailed obituary to Lee he wrote for The Guardian.

== Personal life ==
Bowring is married to Hong Kong politician Claudia Mo, by whom he has two sons.

== Awards and honours ==
Bowring is an honorary member of the Society of Publishers in Asia (SOPA) who, in 2015, proclaimed "His lifework embodies the highest standards of journalistic integrity". He is a Fellow Commoner of St Catharine's College, Cambridge.

== Works ==
- Bowring, Philip; Cottrell, Robert (1984). The Carrian File. Hong Kong: Far Eastern Economic Review.
- Bowring, Philip (2014). Free Trade's First Missionary: Sir John Bowring in Europe and Asia. Hong Kong University Press. ISBN 9789888208722.
- Bowring, Philip (2019). Empire of the Winds. London, New York: I B Tauris & Co. Ltd. ISBN 9781788314466.
- Bowring, Philip (2022). The Making of the Modern Philippines: Pieces of a Jigsaw State. London: Bloomsbury Academic. ISBN 9781350296817.
