= Sin Chung-kai =

Hong Kong politician

- 單仲偕
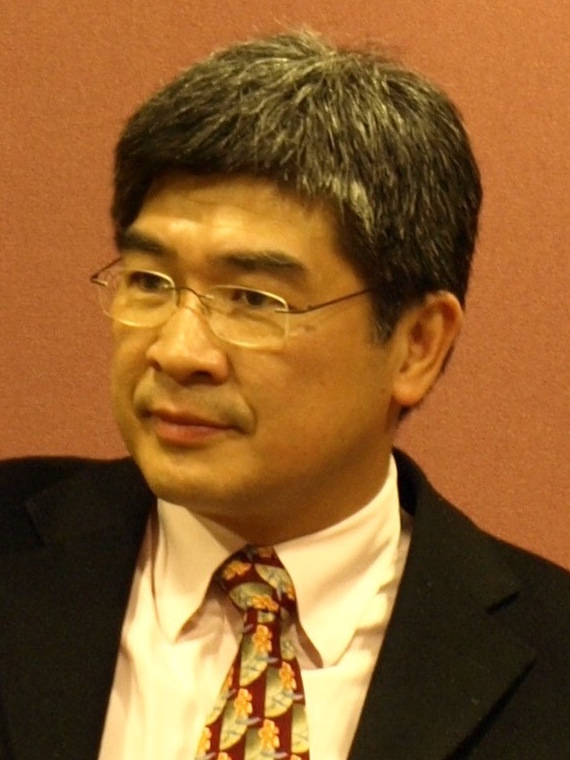
- Sin in 2008

Member of the Legislative Council
- In office 1 October 2012 – 30 September 2016
- Preceded by: Kam Nai-wai
- Succeeded by: Hui Chi-fung
- Constituency: Hong Kong Island
- In office 1 July 1998 – 30 September 2008
- Preceded by: New parliament
- Succeeded by: Samson Tam
- Constituency: Information Technology
- In office 11 October 1995 – 30 June 1997
- Preceded by: New constituency
- Succeeded by: Replaced by Provisional Legislative Council
- Constituency: New Territories South

Personal details
- Born: 15 June 1960 (age 66) Hong Kong
- Party: Hong Kong Association for Democracy and People's Livelihood (until 1990); United Democrats (1990–94) Democratic Party (since 1994)
- Spouse: Yvonne Sin Chan Ying-yee
- Children: 2
- Education: University of Hong Kong (BSc); Chinese University of Hong Kong (MBA)
- Occupation: Legislative Councillor

Sin Chung-kai
- Traditional Chinese: 單仲偕
- Simplified Chinese: 单仲偕
Transcriptions
Standard Mandarin
- Hanyu Pinyin: Shàn Zhòngxié
Yue: Cantonese
- Yale Romanization: Sihn Juhng gāai
- Jyutping: Sin^{6} Zung^{6} gaai^{1}

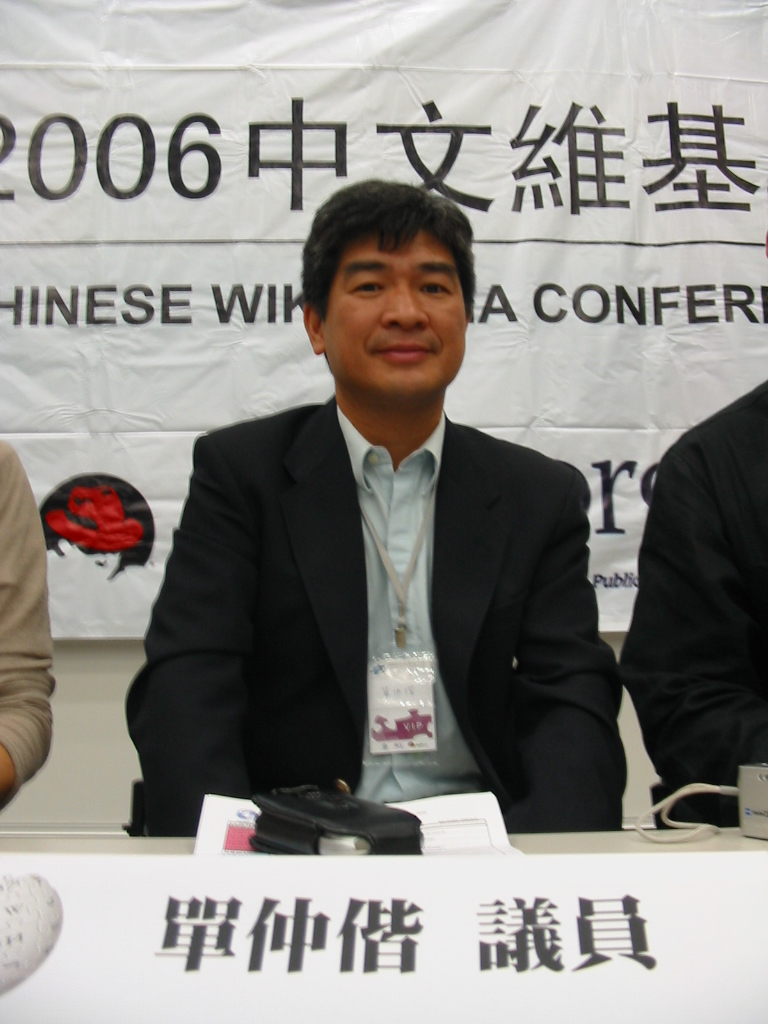
Kai at Chinese Wikimedia Conference 2006

Sin Chung-kai (Chinese: 單仲偕; born 15 June 1960) is a former member of the Hong Kong Legislative Council. He was the chairman and a member of Kwai Tsing District Council for the Wah Lai constituency. He was one of the two vice-chairmen of the Democratic Party until December 2012, and is a member of the Executive Committee.

== Early career ==
In 1982, Sin obtained his bachelor's degree at the University of Hong Kong, where he served as the Current Affairs Secretary of the Student Union. In 1997, he obtained a Master in Business Administration at the Chinese University of Hong Kong.

Sin was formerly employed as an Information Technology manager at The Hongkong and Shanghai Banking Corporation (HSBC), resigning in 2011 to focus on his political career.

== Political career ==
=== District Council ===
Sin's political career began in 1985 when he was first elected to the Kwai Tsing District Board. He was re-elected in subsequent elections, remaining in this role until 2003. Between the years 1994–1999, Sin served as the chairperson of the board.

In 2011, Sin was one of the contenders in the district council election, representing the Tai Hang constituency. He got 40.9% of the votes, losing to Wong Chor-fung of the New People's Party (NPP). In 2014, Sin participated in the by-election for the South Horizons West constituency, where he got 22.9% of the votes and lost to Judy Chan from the NPP.

In 2019, Sin contested in the district council election for the Wah Lai constituency. He won the seat with 51.93% of the votes, defeating pro-Beijing incumbent Wong Yiu-chung. He also became chairperson of the Kwai Tsing District Board again, starting in January 2020.

=== Legislative Council ===
In 1995, Sin ran the Hong Kong legislative election for the New Territories South constituency, winning dominantly with 70.74% of the votes over two other candidates. In 1998, Sin participated in the legislative election, representing the Information Technology functional constituency. He was elected to the Legislative Council with 63.71% of the votes. Sin was re-elected in 2000 and 2004 within the same constituency.

Sin contested in the 2012 Hong Kong legislative election, where he represented the Hong Kong Island constituency. He came in second place after Kenneth Chan Ka-lok with 12.26% of the votes, which secured him a seat on the Legislative Council.

=== Political activities ===
Sin served as an executive committee member in the United Democrats of Hong Kong (UDHK) between the years 1990–1994. Since 1994, he has been affiliated with the Democratic Party. He was also the former vice chairperson of the party. In December 2012, Sin contested in the leadership election of the party, following the resignation of Albert Ho in the aftermath of the 2012 Legislative Council election. Sin lost narrowly to Emily Lau, who had 149 votes to his 133 votes.

In 2007, Sin was awarded the Silver Bauhinia Star for his contributions to public affairs. During his political career, Sin had advocated for human rights, economic prosperity, and free flow of information in Hong Kong. He introduced numerous initiatives to develop the city's IT and telecommunications industries.

On 18 April 2020, Sin was among the 15 prominent pro-democracy figures arrested in Hong Kong. His arrest was made based on the claim that he took part in an unauthorized assembly on 1 October 2019 during the anti-extradition bill protests.

On 10 June 2022, Sin, along the two other pro-democracy figures, had his Silver Bauhinia Star honour removed, and his Justice of the Peace appointment was revoked by the government due to his jail sentences related to anti extradition-bill protests.

== Personal life ==
Sin has been married to his wife since 1986. They have two sons.

Political offices
New title	Member of the Kwai Tsing District Board; Representative for Kwai Chug West; 1985–1994	Constituency abolished
New constituency	Member of the Kwai Tsing District Board; Representative for Wah Fung; 1994–2003	Succeeded by Lee Wing-tat
Preceded by Leung Kwong-cheong	Chairman of the Kwai Tsing District Board; 1994–1999	Succeeded by Chow Yick-hay
Preceded by Wong Yiu-chung	Member of the Kwai Tsing District Council; Representative for Wah Lai; 2020–2021	Vacant
Preceded by Law King-shing	Chairman of the Kwai Tsing District Council; 2020–2021	Succeeded by Leung Kam-wai
Legislative Council of Hong Kong
New seat	Member of Legislative Council; Representative for New Territories South; 1995–1997	Replaced by Provisional Legislative Council
New parliament	Member of Legislative Council; Representative for Information Technology; 1998–2008	Succeeded by Samson Tam
Preceded by Kam Nai-wai	Member of Legislative Council; Representative for Hong Kong Island; 2012–2016	Succeeded by Hui Chi-fung
Party political offices
Preceded by Albert Ho	Vice Chairperson of Democratic Party; 2006–2012; With: Tik Chi-yuen (2006–2008); Emily Lau (2008–2012)	Succeeded by Richard Tsoi; Lo Kin-hei
