= Samson Tam =

Hong Kong politician and businessman

Dr Samson Tam Wai-ho
- 譚偉豪
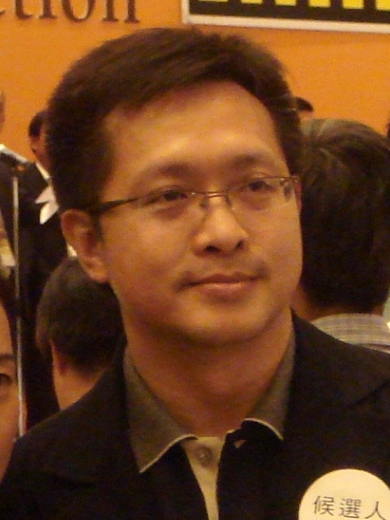
- Samson Tam during the 2008 elections

Member of the Legislative Council of Hong Kong
- In office 1 October 2008 – 30 September 2012
- Preceded by: Sin Chung-kai
- Succeeded by: Charles Mok
- Constituency: Information Technology

Personal details
- Born: 26 February 1964 (age 62) Hong Kong
- Education: Chinese University of Hong Kong (BSc); Hong Kong Polytechnic University (PhD)
- Occupation: Company director

Samson Tam Wai-ho, JP (Chinese: 譚偉豪) (born 26 February 1964 in Hong Kong) was an elected member of the Legislative Council of Hong Kong (Functional constituency, Information Technology) from 2008 to 2012. He is the chairman and one of the founders of Group Sense (International) Limited, the manufacturer of "Instant-Dict" (Chinese: 快譯通) Chinese-English electronic dictionary. He graduated from Chinese University of Hong Kong with a BSc degree. Afterwards he was awarded a PhD by Hong Kong Polytechnic University. He received "The Young Industrialist Award of Hong Kong" in 1992 and was named one of the “Ten Outstanding Young Persons” in 1997. He is also the president of Kitchee SC.

Samson won the seat of functional constituency (information technology) in the Legislative Council of Hong Kong election in the year 2008, defeating Charles Mok, by 35 votes.

In the run-up to 23 June 2010 Legco vote on the Hong Kong government's 2009 reform package, he offered his support if it included the Democratic Party's compromise proposal to have the five new district council functional constituency seats returned by popular election.

In the year 2012, Samson lost his seat in the Legislative Council of Hong Kong to Charles Mok, by 765 votes.

== See also ==
- Politics of Hong Kong
- Democratic development in Hong Kong

Legislative Council of Hong Kong
Preceded by Sin Chung Kai	Member of Legislative Council; Representative for Information Technology; 2008–2012	Succeeded by Charles Mok
