= Asia Sentinel =

American-based web-based blog

- Website type: Blog
- Available in: English
- Headquarters: {{{location_country}}}
- Website: asiasentinel.com
- Commercial: Yes
- Launched: 2006
- Current status: Active

The Asia Sentinel is an online blog focused on news, business, arts and culture in Asia. The site was launched in August 2006 in Hong Kong, and its assets were transferred to a U.S. registered company in 2017.

== History ==
The Asia Sentinel was founded in Hong Kong in August 2006 by four journalists from the United Kingdom and the United States who were based in Asia. The editor-in-chief, John Berthelsen, was formerly a correspondent with The Wall Street Journal Asia, as well as the Newsweek correspondent in Vietnam and managing editor of the Hong Kong Standard. Co-founder Philip Bowring was formerly the editor of the Far Eastern Economic Review and a former columnist for the International Herald Tribune. Executive Editor A. Lin Neumann, a reporter, was formerly executive editor of The Standard and also represented the Committee to Protect Journalists in Asia. Neumann left the Asia Sentinel in 2012. The fourth founder, Anthony Spaeth, was previously a Time Asia regional correspondent, and left the Asia Sentinel shortly after its founding to work for Bloomberg.

In 2017, the publication's parent company in Hong Kong ceased operations, and assets were transferred to a new company, registered in California, that owns all newly written stories.

In 2023, the Singapore Ministry of Home Affairs stated that access to the Asia Sentinel would be blocked in Singapore if it failed to comply with a POFMA correction order issued by the Singapore Government. Asia Sentinel subsequently partially complied with the order by placing the requisite correction notice below the article at issue, alongside a statement that the publication was "reserving the right to answer [the Singapore government's] demand at a future time" and that "we stand by our story". As of 2 June 2023, the site could still be accessed in Singapore.
