= HK First =

Hong Kong political party

HK First 香港本土
- Leader: Claudia Mo; Gary Fan
- Founded: 31 January 2013
- Ideology: Localism (HK); Liberalism (HK)
- Regional affiliation: Pro-democracy camp
- Colours: Gold/Brown

Website
- HK First on Facebook

HK First
- Chinese: 香港本土
- Literal meaning: Hong Kong homeland
Transcriptions
Standard Mandarin
- Hanyu Pinyin: Xiānggǎng běntǔ
Yue: Cantonese
- Yale Romanization: Hēunggóng búntóu
- Jyutping: Hoeng1gong2 bun2tou2

HK First is a localist political group in Hong Kong. It was founded in 2013 by two pro-democracy members of the Legislative Council, Claudia Mo and Gary Fan, to "defend the city's culture from 'mainlandisation'".

== History ==
The group was formed on 31 January 2013 by two pan-democratic legislators, Claudia Mo of the Civic Party and Gary Fan of the Neo Democrats, who sympathised with the growing localist sentiment in Hong Kong. It claims to "help safeguard not only Hong Kong's high degree of autonomy, but also its lifestyle as guaranteed unchanged for 50 years under one country, two systems and stipulated in the Basic Law".

Gary Fan ran in the 2012 Legislative Council election on a "moderate" localist platform in New Territories East while Claudia Mo ran in Kowloon West with the slogan of "against mainlandisation". The two ran again in the 2016 Legislative Council election, in which Fan lost his New Territories East seat, leaving the group with only one representative. In November 2016, Mo announced her resignation from the Civic Party, citing her differences with the party on localism and other issues. She said she would continue serving in the legislature as an "independent democrat" under the label "HK First".

Gary Fan lost his seat in December 2019 after he was ruled to be unduly elected in the by-election. Claudia Mo joined the rest of the pro-democracy colleagues and resigned from the Legislative Council in November 2020, effective 13 November. They were arrested in January 2021 and convicted of "subversion" in the Hong Kong 47 trial for their participation in the primaries. Fan said during the court hearing that he would no longer participate in politics. They were released from jail in April 2025.

== Political positions ==
=== Social policy ===
The group advocates for the protection of cultural aspects of the Hong Kong lifestyle, including the use of traditional Chinese characters, Cantonese and traditional phonetic translation between English and Cantonese, which many localists deemed to be under threat from mainland China's simplified Chinese, Mandarin Chinese and its phonetic translation.

=== Sovereignty ===
In contrast to many other localist organisations, the group does not advocate for Hong Kong independence.

=== Tourism and immigration ===
It also opposed the influx of mainland tourists, grey goods traders, Mainland schoolchildren who were seen as taken away the quota of the local students, panic-buying of baby formula and various social issues in related to Hong Kong–Mainland conflict. It opposed the government's Individual Visit Scheme to limit the number of mainland tourists. They co-sponsored a controversial ad which claimed that reducing immigration would help the people of Hong Kong to get to the bottom of the housing problem, while rejecting claims of bias or discrimination against mainlanders, despite condemnation from the Equal Opportunities Commission. Fan later introduced a motion on adhering to the need to "put Hong Kong people first" in formulating policies, but the motion was ultimately defeated.
