= Claudia Mo =

Hong kong journalist and politician (born 1957)

- 毛孟靜
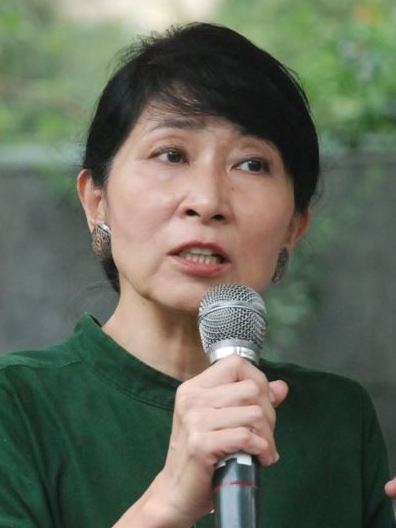
- Claudia Mo in 2013

Member of the Legislative Council
- In office 1 October 2012 – 13 November 2020
- Preceded by: Frederick Fung
- Succeeded by: Abolished
- Constituency: Kowloon West

Personal details
- Born: Mo Man-ching; 18 January 1957 (age 69) British Hong Kong
- Party: Civic Party (2006–2016); HK First (2013–present)
- Spouse: Philip Bowring
- Children: 2
- Education: Carleton University
- Occupation: Journalist, Columnist, Television presenter, Lecturer, Author

Claudia Mo
- Traditional Chinese: 毛孟靜
- Simplified Chinese: 毛孟静
Transcriptions
Standard Mandarin
- Hanyu Pinyin: Máo Mèngjìng
Yue: Cantonese
- Yale Romanization: Mòuh Maahng jihng
- Jyutping: Mou^{4} Maang^{6} zing^{6}

Claudia Mo Man-ching (born 18 January 1957) is a Hong Kong journalist and politician, a member of the pan-democracy camp. She represented the Kowloon West geographical constituency, until November 2020 when she resigned along other pro-democrats to protest against the disqualification of four of her colleagues by the government.

Claudia Mo is one of 53 activists who were arrested in January 2021 under Hong Kong's new National Security Law. On 28 February, she, together with 46 other defendants, were charged with the offence of conspiracy to commit subversion. They appeared in West Kowloon Magistracy on 1 March. After a four-day bail hearing, the court denied her bail and remanded her and 31 other co-defendants in jail custody for three months, pending further police investigation. A court judgement released in late May 2021 evinced that WhatsApp messages to international media had been considered in the judgement to deny Mo bail earlier in April under the stringent bail conditions of the national security law. In November 2024 she was sentenced to 4 years and 2 months of imprisonment. She completed her sentence in April 2025.

== Personal life and education ==
Mo was born in Hong Kong, to where her parents had arrived as refugees from Ningbo, Zhejiang, in 1950. She is married to journalist Philip Bowring, former editor of the Far Eastern Economic Review, and they have two sons.

She attended St. Paul's Secondary School in Hong Kong. After graduating in 1975, she went to Toronto for pre-university qualifications and in 1979 she obtained a Bachelor's degree in journalism with English studies from Carleton University in Ottawa, Canada.

After graduating and returning to Hong Kong in 1980 she worked at Agence France-Presse (AFP) translating French wires into Chinese. She was later promoted to chief Hong Kong correspondent for AFP, covering in this role the Tiananmen Square massacre, an event which she describes as a "watershed [...] that cemented my journalistic principles and political beliefs".

She continued her work as a journalist at The Standard and TVB. She also hosted a number of RTHK TV and radio programmes, including "Media Watch" and "City Forum".

Mo wrote a book called We Want True Democracy, published in 2015, and has also authored English language learning books.

47 UK MPs filed a letter calling for her release in March 2023 to allow her to spend time with her husband, who was then in an ICU ward.

== Politics ==
Mo was a founding member of the Civic Party in 2006. She first ran in the Kowloon West geographical constituency in the 2008 Legislative Council election but was unsuccessful.

In the 2012 election, she won one of the constituency's five available seats. She ran with the slogan "Against Mainlandisation" which led to controversy within the party, as the Civic Party used the slogan "Against Communistisation." After her election, she was considered more pro-localist within the party. She formed the "HK First" with Neo Democrats' Gary Fan to work on the localist agenda.

Mo took part in the 2014 Hong Kong protests. The following year, she told a journalist that she did not consider the protests a failure, due to the attention they seemed to have drawn by many to the "plight of the Hong Kong people". On the same occasion, she spoke of a "parental mentality" of the Chinese Central Government towards Hong Kong.

In the 2016 election, she was re-elected with the slogan of "self-determination". She later quit the Civic Party on 14 November 2016, citing differences with the party on localism, filibuster and other issues. She said she would continue serving the legislature as an "independent democrat" under the label "HK First".

=== Insult from Junius Ho ===
During a 2019 Legislative Council meeting, Pro-Beijing lawmaker Junius Ho made a remark directed toward Claudia Mo, stating that she is used to "eating foreign sausage." Mo, who is married to British journalist Philip Bowring, later told the council that the comment was "blatantly sexist, racist and it amounts to sexual harassment." Ho refused to apologise and was expelled from the meeting.

== 47 democrats case ==
On 6 January 2021, Mo was among 53 members of the pro-democratic camp who were arrested under the national security law, specifically its provision regarding alleged subversion. The group stood accused of the organisation of and participation in unofficial primary elections held by the camp in July 2020. Mo was released on bail on 7 January.

In late February 2021 after being charged with subversion, Mo was under custody again, and on 4 March, she was among only 15 of the 47 defendants in the case to be granted bail. However, she remained in custody pending an appeal by the Hong Kong government. She was denied bail in mid-April, with a judgement releasing in late May considering the argument of the prosecution that her exchanges on WhatsApp with Western media were a "threat to national security".

In August 2022, Mo admitted her guilt to a charge of "conspiracy to subvert state powers". She was one of 29 of 47 activists who pled guilty to the same charge: their sentencing was adjourned, pending trial of the 17 other co-defendants. In November 2024 she was sentenced to 4 years and 2 months of imprisonment.

In April 2025, Mo was released from jail. She was among the first batch, comprising three others besides Mo, of the 45 who had been sentenced in November 2024.

== Television career ==
- News at 6:30 – TVB, 1982–85
- Media Watch – RTHK, 1991–2008
- City Forum – RTHK, 1993–95
- All-Primary Schools Inter-school Quiz – RTHK, 1992–94
- We're All Parents – Cable Television

== See also ==
- Gary Fan
- Localism in Hong Kong
- Neo Democrats

Legislative Council of Hong Kong
Preceded by Frederick Fung	Member of Legislative Council; Representative for Kowloon West; 2012–2020	Vacant
Preceded by Charles Mok	Convenor of pro-democracy camp 2018–2019	Succeeded by Tanya Chan
