= Functional constituency =

Electoral device used within Macau and Hong Kong

A functional constituency is an electoral device (a non-geographical constituency) used within the political systems of two Special Administrative Regions of the People's Republic of China:

- Functional constituency in Hong Kong
- Indirectly elected member in Macau

The 1948 election to the Legislative Yuan of the Republic of China used a mixed electoral system, including some members elected by occupational groups, as specified by the 1947 constitution. Soon after, the Communist Revolution impelled the governing Kuomintang to suspend the constitution and retreat to Taiwan. The 1991 reforms which reintroduced democracy to Taiwan removed occupational constituencies from the Legislative Yuan.

== See also ==
- Vocational panels in Seanad Éireann, the Irish Senate.
- University constituency
