= Information Technology (constituency) =

Information Technology 資訊科技界
- Former functional constituency for the Legislative Council of Hong Kong
- Region: Hong Kong
- Electorate: 13,000 (2020)

Former constituency
- Created: 1998
- Abolished: 2021
- Number of members: One
- Replaced by: Technology and Innovation

The Information Technology functional constituency (Chinese: 資訊科技界功能界別) was a functional constituency in the elections for the Legislative Council of Hong Kong until it was replaced by Technology and Innovation functional constituency with a much narrower electorate in the 2021 electoral overhaul.

Since its creation in 1998, it was normally held by the pro-democracy camp, with an interruption from 2008 to 2012, when the seat was held by pro-Beijing Samson Tam who defeated pro-democracy candidate Charles Mok by 35 votes with the help of the Internet Professional Association (iProA), a pro-Beijing IT association. In 2012, Mok retook the seat for the pro-democrats from the pro-Beijing camp by defeating Tam. Mok resigned effective 1 December 2020 as part of the 2020 LegCo mass resignations in protest of the disqualification of four pro-democracy legislators.

== Composition ==
The Information Technology constituency was composed of individuals who are members of relevant associations such as the Hong Kong Computer Society, and Institute of Electrical and Electronics Engineers and corporate members of organisations such as the Hong Kong Information Technology Federation, Hong Kong Wireless Technology Industry and Society of Hong Kong External Telecommunications Services Providers who are entitled to vote at general meetings, as well as some other corporations with certain licences granted by the Telecommunication Authority.

Since 1998, there have been a number of additional associations included in the electorate. In 2006, there were four organisations where individual members were qualified as electorates although they were not allowed to vote in the general meetings, such as the Professional Information Security Association and the Hong Kong and Mainland Software Industry Corporation Association. Since 2003, members of the pro-Beijing Internet Professional Association (iProA) are also eligible to vote in the constituency, which helped its pro-Beijing member Samson Tam to take the seat from pro-democrats' hand in the 2008 Legislative Council election.

In 2006, there were 4,743 individuals (94.9% of the electorate) and 261 registered corporations (4.1% of the electorate). In 2016, it saw an 80% surge in the number of registered voters, from 6,716 in 2012 to 12,046 in 2016, according to provisional voter statistics released by the Registration and Electoral Office. Incumbent legislator Charles Mok questioned whether pro-Beijing forces were getting people to sign up.

In April 2017, the Independent Commission Against Corruption arrested 72 people over alleged vote-rigging, 68 of them were newly registered electors and four were middlemen, three of whom were registered voters. A source identified them as the members of the Internet Professional Association (iProA) and the Institute of Electrical and Electronics Engineers (IEEE), Hong Kong section, computer chapter.

== Returned members ==
Election	Member	Party	Votes	%
1998	Sin Chung-kai	Democratic	1,543	63.71
2000	Sin Chung-kai	Democratic	1,770	73.69
2004	Sin Chung-kai	Democratic	1,946	52.59
2008	Samson Tam Wai-ho	Independent	2,017	50.44
2012	Charles Peter Mok	Professional Commons	2,828	57.82
2016	Charles Peter Mok	Professional Commons	6,253	64.61

== Electoral results ==
=== 2010s ===
2016 Hong Kong legislative election: Information Technology
Party	Candidate	Votes	%	±%
Prof Commons	Charles Peter Mok	6,253	64.61	+6.79
Nonpartisan	Eric Yeung Chuen-sing	3,425	35.39	
Majority		2,828	29.22	
Total valid votes		9,678	100.00	
Rejected ballots		205		
Turnout		9,883	81.74	+5.55
Registered electors		12,091		
Prof Commons hold		Swing		

2012 Hong Kong legislative election: Information Technology
Party	Candidate	Votes	%	±%
Independent	Charles Peter Mok	2,828	57.82	+8.26
Independent	Tam Wai-ho	2,063	42.18	−8.26
Majority		765	15.64	
Total valid votes		4,891	100.00	
Rejected ballots		204		
Turnout		5,095	76.19	
Registered electors		6,687		
Independent gain from Nonpartisan		Swing		

=== 2000s ===
2008 Hong Kong legislative election: Information Technology
Party	Candidate	Votes	%	±%
Independent	Tam Wai-ho	2,017	50.44	+7.79
Nonpartisan	Charles Peter Mok	1,982	49.56	
Majority		35	0.88	
Total valid votes		3,999	100.00	
Rejected ballots		138		
Turnout		4,137	71.96	
Registered electors		5,749		
Independent gain from Nonpartisan		Swing		

2004 Hong Kong legislative election: Information Technology
Party	Candidate	Votes	%	±%
Democratic	Sin Chung-kai	1,946	52.59	−21.20
Nonpartisan	Tam Wai-ho	1,578	42.65	
Independent	Leung Mun-yee	176	4.76	
Majority		368	9.94	
Total valid votes		3,700	100.00	
Rejected ballots		52		
Turnout		3,752	82.08	
Registered electors		4,571		
Democratic hold		Swing		

2000 Hong Kong legislative election: Information Technology
Party	Candidate	Votes	%	±%
Democratic	Sin Chung-kai	1,770	73.69	+9.98
Nonpartisan (New Forum)	Kan Wing-kei	632	26.31	
Majority		1,138	47.38	
Total valid votes		2,402	100.00	
Rejected ballots		78		
Turnout		2,480	64.80	
Registered electors		3,827		
Democratic hold		Swing		

=== 1990s ===
1998 Hong Kong legislative election: Information Technology
Party	Candidate	Votes	%	±%
Democratic	Sin Chung-kai	1,543	63.71	
Nonpartisan	Yung Kai-ling	456	18.83	
Nonpartisan	Chan Kei-foo	423	17.46	
Majority		1,087	44.88	
Total valid votes		2,422	100.00	
Rejected ballots		72		
Turnout		2,494	80.19	
Registered electors		3,110		
Democratic win (new seat)				
