= Charles Mok =

Hong Kong Internet entrepreneur and IT advocate

Charles Mok JP
- 莫乃光
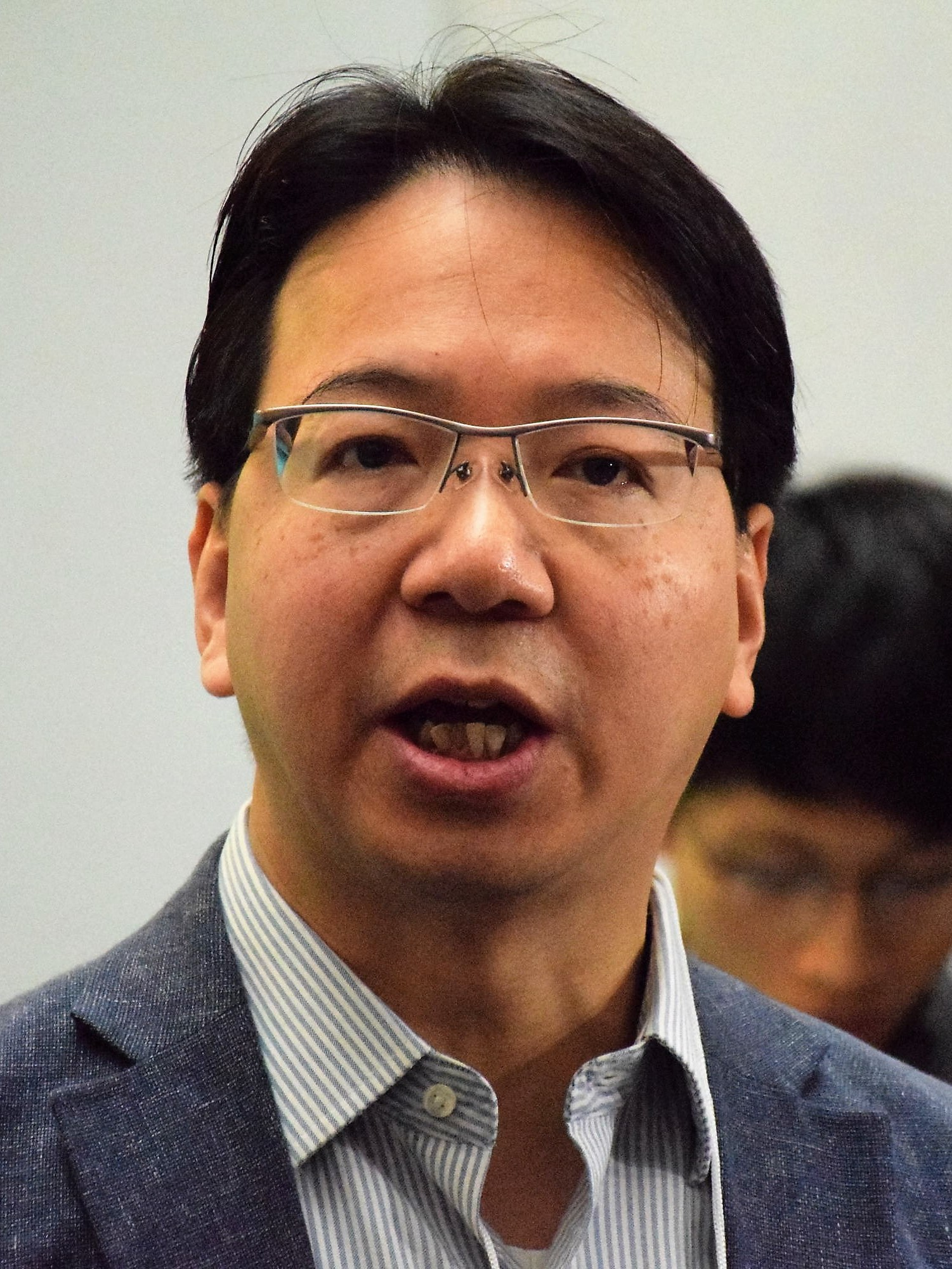

Member of the Legislative Council
- In office 1 October 2012 – 1 December 2020
- Preceded by: Samson Tam
- Succeeded by: Duncan Chiu (Technology and Innovation)
- Constituency: Information Technology

Personal details
- Born: 25 October 1964 (age 61) Hong Kong
- Party: Professional Commons
- Education: Wah Yan College; Purdue University
- Website: charlesmok.hk

Charles Mok
- Chinese: 莫乃光
Transcriptions
Standard Mandarin
- Hanyu Pinyin: Mò Nǎiguāng
Yue: Cantonese
- Jyutping: Mok6 Naai5 Gwong1

Charles Peter Mok Nai-kwong, JP (born 25 October 1964) is a Hong Kong–based Internet entrepreneur and IT advocate who formerly represented the Information Technology functional constituency on the Hong Kong Legislative Council.

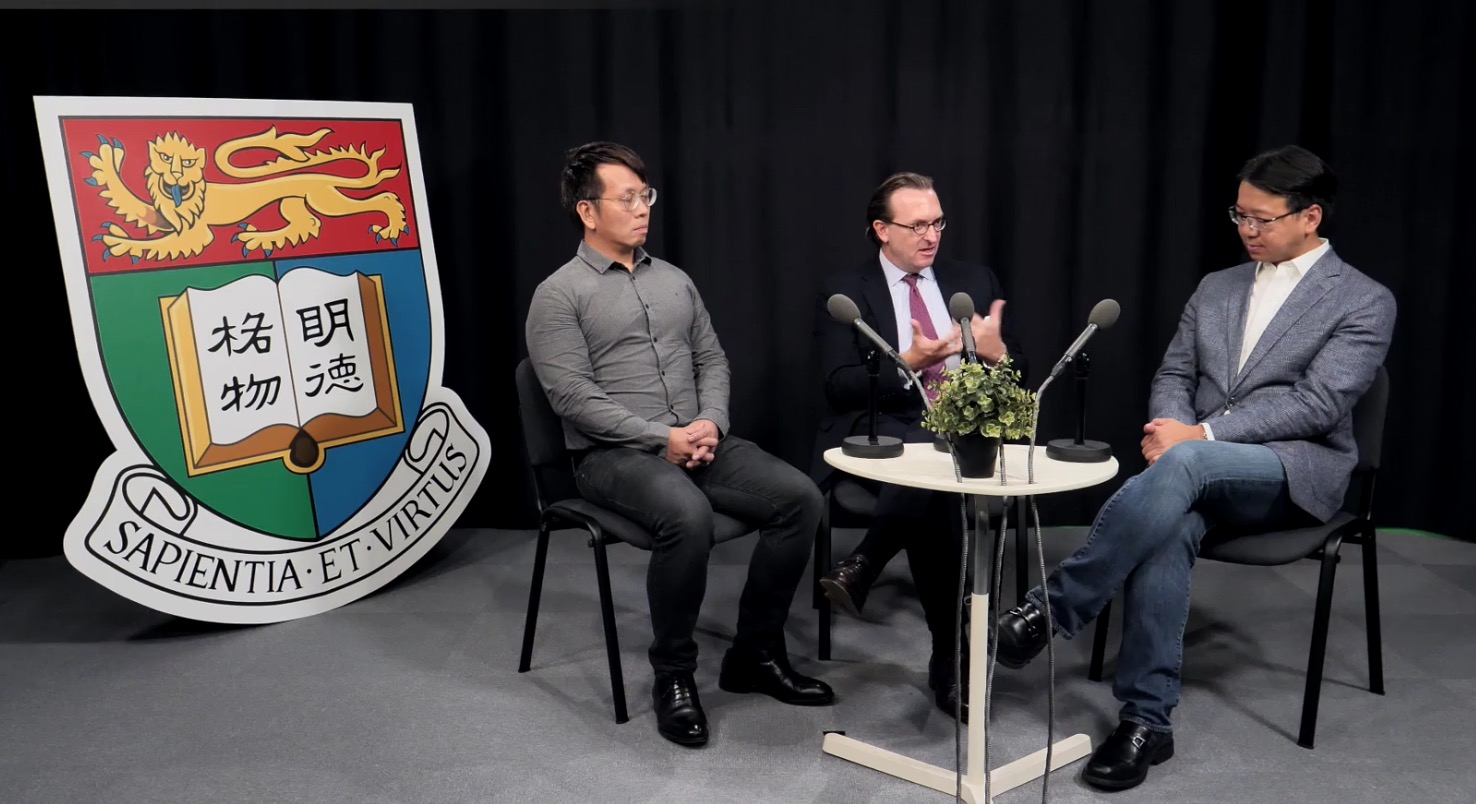
Mok is interviewed by Professor Douglas W. Arner(centre) from the University of Hong Kong on FinTech.

Mok founded HKNet in 1994, and contributed the company's expansion as a major IP telecommunications operator in Hong Kong before its acquisition by NTT Communications in 2000. He was a founding chairman of Internet Society, Hong Kong Chapter, and the ex officio member and ex-president of the Hong Kong Information Technology Federation. He was also a past chairman and a co-founder of the Hong Kong Internet Service Providers Association. He is currently a Hong Kong Legislative Councillor.

He has been actively promoting the industry's development and digital comprehension in the region since the early 1990s. He has been actively participating in the community to promote fair competition, media freedom, personal privacy, consumer protection, healthcare, transport, human rights and democracy development in Hong Kong. In 1999, he was awarded as one of Hong Kong's " Ten Outstanding Young Digi Persons”.

Mok is currently a regular columnist for a number of local print media, including the Hong Kong Economic Journal (since 2000) and CUP magazine (since 2005).

In Hong Kong's 2008 Legislative Council Election, Mok lost to Samson Tam in the Information Technology functional constituency with 1982 votes, just 35 fewer than Tam's total of 2017 votes. Mok commenced a legal action in the High Court of Hong Kong against Tam in relation to the latter's alleged misconduct during campaigning.

In the 2012 election, Mok won the Information Technology seat with 2,828 votes, against 2,063 votes for the incumbent, his only opponent, Tam. He was reelected his Legislative Council seat in the 2016 election.

Mok is a Visiting Scholar at the Global Digital Policy Incubator of the Cyber Policy Center at Stanford University, a member of the Board of Trustees of the Internet Society, and a board member of the International Centre for Trade Transparency and Monitoring.

== Education ==
Mok attended Wah Yan College, Hong Kong (Class of 1981), a Roman Catholic single-gender secondary school in Hong Kong. He received his bachelor's and master's degrees, in 1985 and 1987 respectively, in Electrical Engineering from Purdue University, United States. Mok was a PhD candidate in Enterprise Management at Shanghai University of Finance and Economics, People's Republic of China.

== Electoral history ==
=== 2008 Hong Kong legislative election ===
Hong Kong legislative election, 2008: Information Technology
Party	Candidate	Votes	%	±%
Independent	Tam Wai-ho	2,017	50.44	+7.79
Nonpartisan	Charles Peter Mok	1,982	49.56	
Majority		35	0.88	
Total valid votes		3,999	100.00	
Rejected ballots		138		
Turnout		4,137	71.96	
Registered electors		5,749		
Independent gain from Nonpartisan		Swing		

=== 2012 Hong Kong legislative election ===
Hong Kong legislative election, 2012: Information Technology
Party	Candidate	Votes	%	±%
Independent (Prof Commons)	Charles Peter Mok	2,828	57.82	+8.26
Independent	Tam Wai-ho	2,063	42.18	−8.26
Majority		765	15.64	
Total valid votes		4,891	100.00	
Rejected ballots		204		
Turnout		5,095	76.19	
Registered electors		6,687		
Independent gain from Nonpartisan		Swing		

=== 2016 Hong Kong legislative election ===
Hong Kong legislative election, 2016: Information Technology
Party	Candidate	Votes	%	±%
Prof Commons	Charles Peter Mok	6,253	64.61	+6.79
Nonpartisan	Eric Yeung Chuen-sing	3,425	35.39	
Majority		2,828	29.22	
Total valid votes		9,678	100.00	
Rejected ballots		205		
Turnout		9,883	81.74	+5.55
Registered electors		12,091		
Prof Commons hold		Swing		

== Public services ==
- Professional Commons, Vice-Chairman (since 2008)
- Internet Society Hong Kong Chairman
- Hong Kong Information Technology Federation Ex officio Member; Past President (2001–2005)
- Hong Kong Computer Society Chair, Health Information Technology Special Interest Division
- Hong Kong Internet Service Providers Association Past chairman (1998–2000)
- Web-based Services and Computer Network Working Group, Vice-Chairman, Chairman.
- Supporting Services Development Committee, Vice-Chairman.
- Radio Television Hong Kong Member, Television Programme Advisory Committee
- HK Human Rights Monitor Founding Member
- Hong Kong Democratic Foundation, director

== Publication ==
- "Innovation and Entrepreneurship Support Policy by Government: HKSAR as Example”, “Waiguo Jingji Yu Guanli” (“Foreign Economics and Management”) Journal Vol. 28, Shanghai University of Finance and Economics, August 2006

== See also ==
- HKNet
- Mok
- Hong Kong Human Rights Monitor

Legislative Council of Hong Kong
Preceded by Samson Tam	Member of Legislative Council; Representative for Information Technology; 2012–2020	Succeeded by Duncan Chiu (Technology and Innovation)
Preceded by James To	Convenor of pro-democracy camp 2017–2018	Succeeded by Claudia Mo
