= Professional Commons =

Professional Commons 公共專業聯盟
- Chairman: Paul Zimmerman
- Founded: 25 March 2007
- Headquarters: 22/F, On Hong Commercial Building, 141-147 Hennessy Road, Wan Chai, Hong Kong
- Ideology: Liberalism (HK)
- Regional affiliation: Pro-democracy camp
- Slogan: "Serving Public Interest with Professional Integrity."
- Legislative Council: 0 / 90
- District Councils: 0 / 470

Website
- procommons.org.hk at the Wayback Machine (archived 2026-02-16)

Professional Commons
- Traditional Chinese: 公共專業聯盟
- Simplified Chinese: 公共专业联盟
- Literal meaning: public professional alliance
Transcriptions
Standard Mandarin
- Hanyu Pinyin: gōnggòng zhuānyè liánméng
Yue: Cantonese
- Yale Romanization: gūng guhng jyūn yihp lyùhn màhng
- Jyutping: gung^{1} gung^{6} zyun^{1} jip^{6} lyun^{4} mang^{4}

The Professional Commons is an independent, membership-based, non-profit organisation and public policy think tank established in Hong Kong on 25 March 2007. It is open to all professionals who share the same values.

== Mission ==
The Professional Commons aims at improving the quality of public governance and empowering the community in the policy-making process by harnessing the soft power of responsible professionalism. The Professional Commons' missions are:

- To achieve equal and universal suffrage;
- To monitor government through professional analysis;
- To engage with the community in developing public policies;
- To express professional views in the pursuit of public interest; and
- To uphold core values of professional independence, freedom and integrity.

The Professional Commons vow to work to promote matters of significant public interest rather than those of sectoral or trade interests.

== History ==
During the Chief Executive election in March 2007, over 100 Election Committee (EC) members from various professional sectors joined hands to advocate a faster pace for democracy. Many of these EC members, together with like-minded professionals, decided afterwards to build on this foundation as an agent for democratisation and good governance.

In the 2012 LegCo election, three Professional Commons members were elected to the legislature including Charles Mok in the Information Technology functional constituency (FC), Kenneth Leung in the Accountancy FC, and Dennis Kwok, who ran as a Civic Party candidate, in the Legal FC.

== Structure ==
It adopts a network-based governance model and organisational matters are handled by three committees elected from among the members: the Strategy Committee, Management Committee and Communications Committee.

=== Issue task group ===
Members may at any time, subject to the approval of the Strategy Committee, set up an issue task group provided at least 4 members from at least 3 professional sectors have expressed interest to play an active role. All task groups are open to all members. A convenor and a co-convenor, who shall serve as the link with the Strategy Committee, shall be elected from among the members of the relevant task groups.

== Leadership ==
=== Chairmen ===
- Charles Mok
- Kenneth Leung
- Stanley Ng
- Paul Zimmerman

== Performance in elections ==
=== Legislative council elections ===
Election	Number of popular votes	% of popular votes	GC seats	FC seats	Total seats	+/−	Position
2016	–	–	0	2	2 / 70	0	8th▲

== See also ==
- List of think tanks in Hong Kong
