= Hong Kong Institute of Planners =

Hong Kong organisation of town planners

- 香港規劃師學會
- Abbreviation: HKIP
- Formation: 1978
- Legal status: Professional association, Statutory body
- Headquarters: North Point
- Location: Hong Kong
- Members: Town planners
- Official language: Cantonese, English
- President: Ms Theresa Yeung
- Website: Official website

Hong Kong Institute of Planners
- Traditional Chinese: 香港規劃師學會
- Simplified Chinese: 香港规划师学会
Transcriptions
Standard Mandarin
- Hanyu Pinyin: Xiānggǎng Guīhuàshī Xuéhuì
Yue: Cantonese
- Jyutping: hoeng1 gong2 kwai1 waak6 si1 hok6 wui6*2

The Hong Kong Institute of Planners (HKIP, Chinese: 香港規劃師學會) is a professional body for town planners in Hong Kong. It officially began operation in 1978. It became a statutory body in 1991 when the Legislative Council of Hong Kong enacted the Hong Kong Institute of Planners Incorporation Ordinance.

The institute is involved in the accreditation of urban planning professionals, advisory on urban issues, and education in the field. It is also a medium for networking between urban planning professionals in Hong Kong. Membership is an accepted qualification for work in the Hong Kong government as well as the private sector. Besides, the institute is one of the constituent institutes of the Architectural, Surveying and Planning functional constituency for the Legislative Council elections.

== Membership ==
The Hong Kong Institute of Planners membership system promotes professional excellence, knowledge sharing, and ethical practice. It consists of different grades, including Honorary Member, Fellow, Full Member, Retired Member, Student Member and Affiliate. Requirements vary for each grade, and members must follow the Code of Professional Conduct. The system fosters a supportive community and upholds high standards in urban and regional planning in Hong Kong. Fellows may use the post-nominal FHKIP and Full Members may use the post-nominal MHKIP after their title.

== Research ==
The institute published the annual journal Planning and Development which aims to promote the exchange of knowledge and ideas related to urban planning and development in Hong Kong and beyond, covering a wide range of topics such as urban design, transportation, housing, sustainability, and community engagement. The journal also includes reviews of important planning events and developments in Hong Kong and beyond.

== See also ==
- Architecture of Hong Kong
- Hong Kong Institute of Architects
- Hong Kong Institute of Urban Design
