= Hong Kong Institute of Urban Design =

Hong Kong Institute of Urban Design 香港城市設計學會
- Abbreviation: HKIUD
- Formation: 17 June 2010
- Type: NGO
- Legal status: Professional association
- Purpose: Advisory and educational
- Headquarters: Lippo Centre
- Location: Hong Kong
- Members: Urban designers
- Official language: Chinese; English
- President: Mr. Donald CHOI (2020-2022) Mr. Joel CHAN (2018-2020) Prof. Stephen TANG, BBS (2016-2018) Dr. Peter Cookson SMITH (2014-2016) Prof. Bernard LIM, BBS, JP (2010-2014)
- Website: hkiud.org

Hong Kong Institute of Urban Design
- Traditional Chinese: 香港城市設計學會
- Simplified Chinese: 香港城市设计学会
Transcriptions
Standard Mandarin
- Hanyu Pinyin: Xiānggǎng Chéngshì Shèjì Xuéhuì
Yue: Cantonese
- Jyutping: hoeng1 gong2 sing4 si5 cit3 gai3

The Hong Kong Institute of Urban Design (HKIUD, Chinese: 香港城市設計學會) is a professional body for urban designers in Hong Kong. It was founded on 17 June 2010 with the support of Hong Kong Government who sent the Secretary for Development to officiate the inaugural launch. The founding president is Bernard Lim Wan-fung JP (林雲峰).

== Focus ==
The institute is mainly involved in accreditation of urban design professionals, advisory on urban issues, and education in the field. It is also a medium for networking between urban design professionals in Hong Kong.

== Activities ==
HKIUD holds community workshops, exhibitions and other events in conjunction with the Hong Kong government, the Hong Kong Institute of Architects, the Hong Kong Institute of Planners and local universities. It regularly makes recommendations to government on urban design-related issues, particularly the various urban redevelopment schemes ongoing in the region, by attending forums and submitting comments. Sometimes this is done in collaboration with other professional bodies.

It also hosts a wing for students and younger practitioners called Young Urban-Design Professionals (YUP), and holds ties to the urban design programmes offered by Chinese University of Hong Kong and the University of Hong Kong. The group supported a design competition for a public works bridge project in Tai O in 2012.

One of the institute's notable events was the 2012 HKIUD International Conference held at Langham Place with over 200 participants in workshops, panel discussions and guided tours on the theme of "Urban Design as Public Policy" over two days. Carrie Lam, then-Secretary for Development, officiated the conference.

== Ongoing involvements ==
HKIUD participates in many ongoing urban projects in Hong Kong including the enhancement of Hong Kong waterfronts through the involvement in Harbourfront Commission as a sitting member, the Land Development Advisory Committee and subcommittees, the Transport Advisory Committee and the Common Spatial Data Advisory Committee.

== See also ==
- Architecture of Hong Kong
- Hong Kong Institute of Architects
- Hong Kong Institute of Planners
