= Hunghom Bay Centre =

Private housing estate in Kowloon, Hong Kong

Coordinates: 22.3058°N 114.1854°E

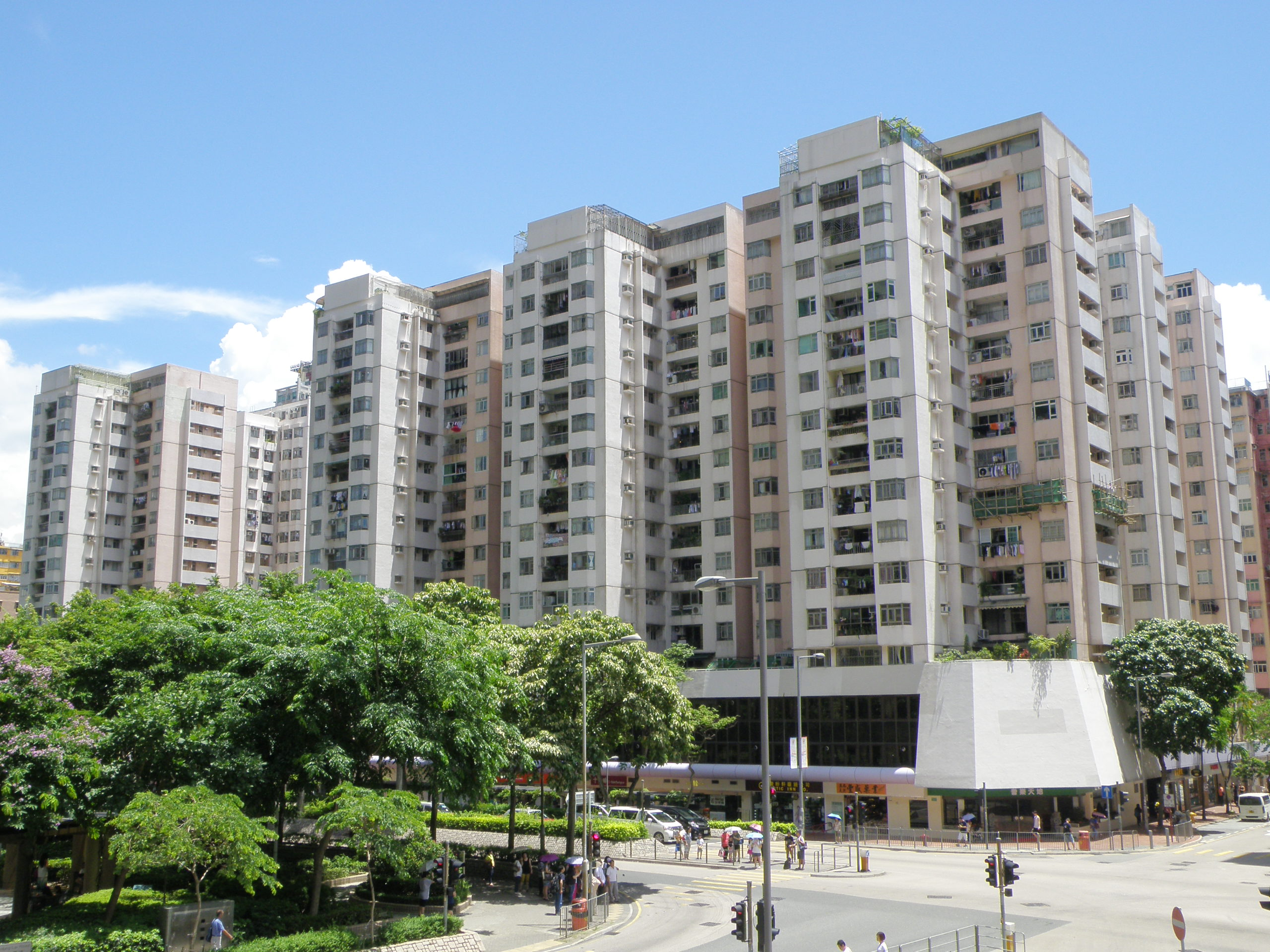
Hunghom Bay Centre in June 2015

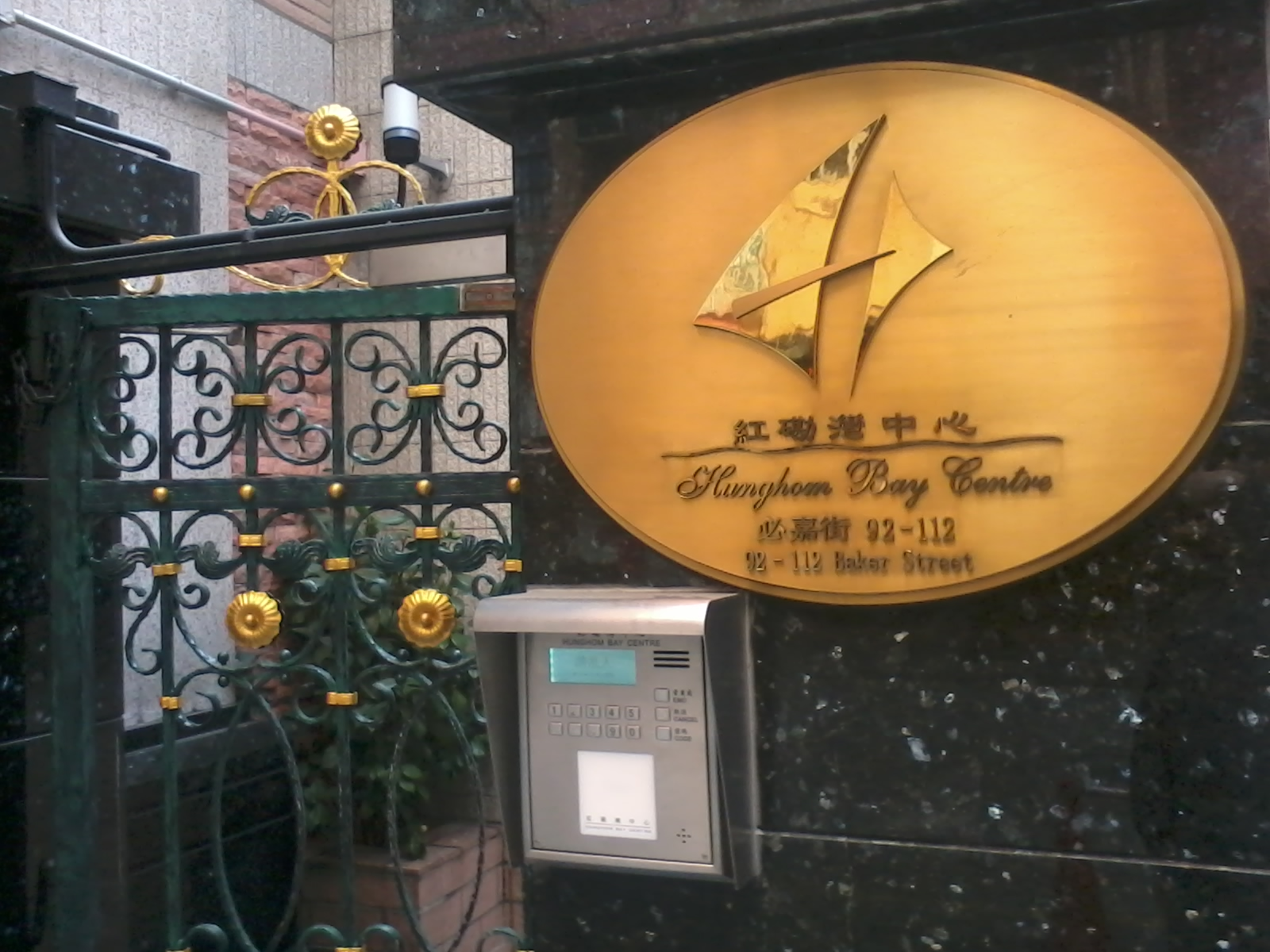
Hunghom Bay Centre in January 2013

Hunghom Bay Centre (Chinese: 紅磡灣中心) is a private housing estate in Baker Street, Hung Hom, Kowloon, Hong Kong, near Whampoa Garden. It consists of 11 residential towers with a total of 814 residential units, which were developed by Hutchison Whampoa and completed in 1978. It approached Hung Hom Bay and old Hung Hom Ferry Pier until Hung Hom Bay was reclaimed in 1990s.

Hunghom Bay Centre received an Honorable Mention at the 1980 Hong Kong Institute of Architects Annual Awards.
