= HKIA =

HKIA may refer to:

- Hamid Karzai International Airport, an airport in Kabul, Afghanistan (renamed Kabul International Airport)
- Hong Kong Institute of Architects, a professional body for architects in Hong Kong
- Hong Kong International Airport, an airport in Chek Lap Kok, New Territories, Hong Kong
- Former Hong Kong International Airport (a.k.a. Kai Tak Airport), an airport in Kowloon, Hong Kong, replaced by Chek Lap Kok Airport
- Hosea Kutako International Airport, an airport in Windhoek, Namibia
- Hello Kitty Island Adventure, a video game
