= Architecture of Hong Kong =

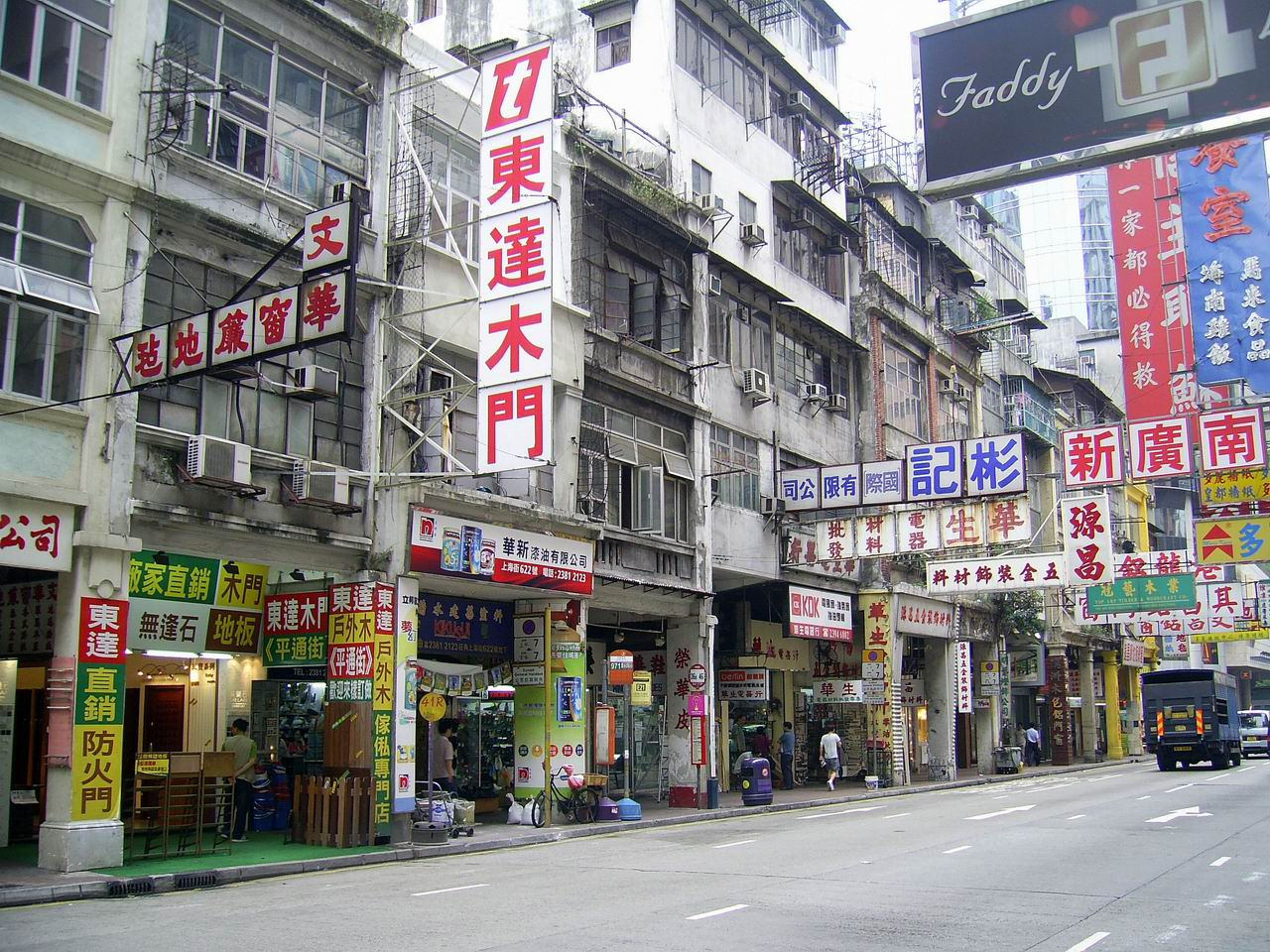
Tong lau in Mong Kok. Once a ubiquitous form of mixed-use architecture in Hong Kong, such shophouses are now a rare sight. These particular shophouses were redeveloped by the Urban Renewal Authority in 2016.

The architecture of Hong Kong features great emphasis on contemporary architecture, especially Modernism, Postmodernism, and Functionalism. Due to the lack of available land, few historical buildings remain in the urban areas of Hong Kong. Therefore, Hong Kong has become a centre for modern architecture as older buildings are cleared away to make space for newer, larger buildings. It has more buildings above 35m (or 100m) and more skyscrapers above 150m than any other city. Hong Kong's skyline is often considered to be the best in the world, with the mountains and Victoria Harbour complementing the skyscrapers.

== Pre-sincisation architecture ==
Back in the day of the Nanyue kingdom, Hong Kong was already inhabited. Baiyue peoples in the area demonstrated some level of sophistication in architecture. An example is the Lei Cheng Uk Han Tomb.

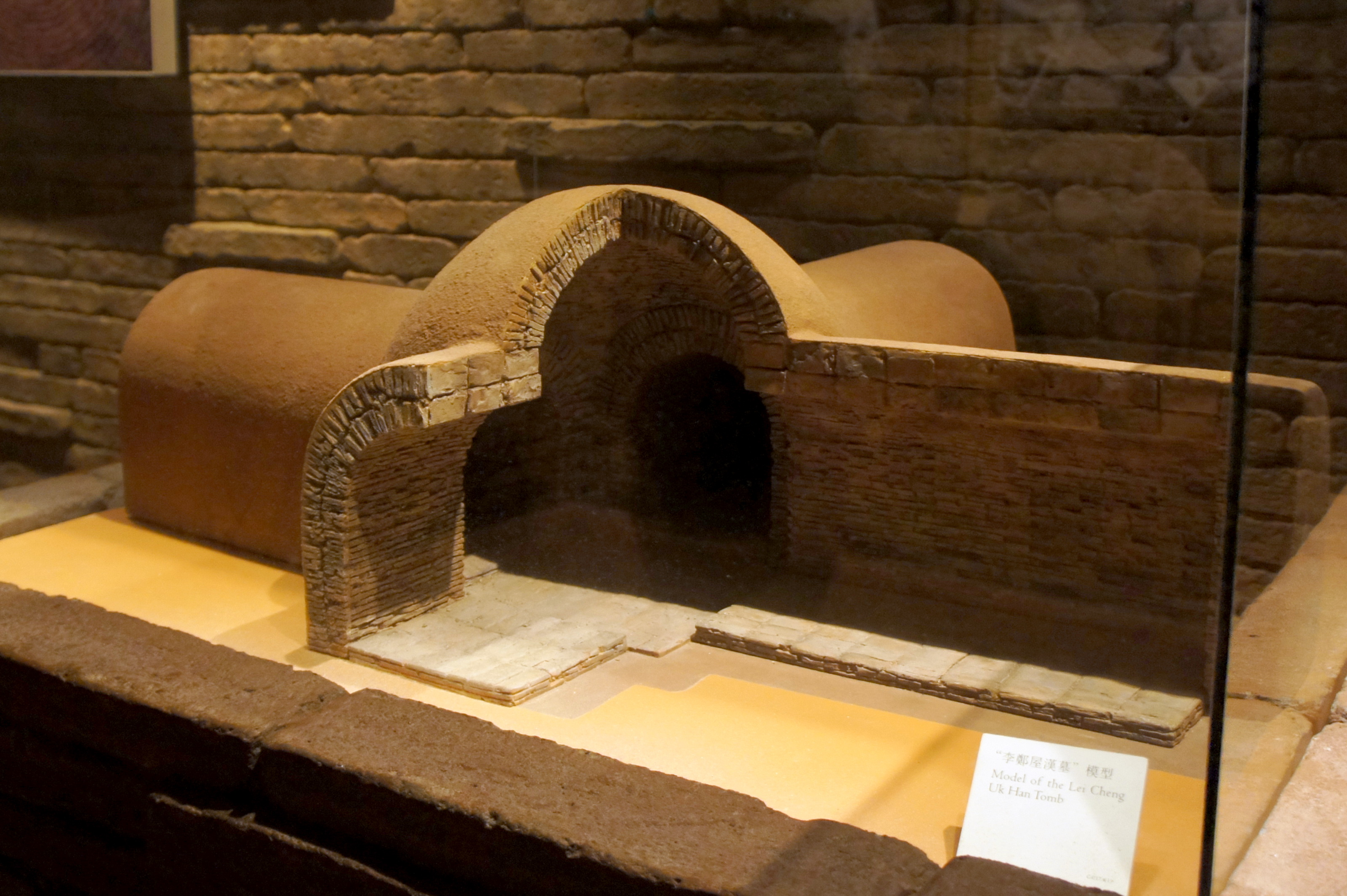
Model of Lei Cheng Uk Han Tomb.

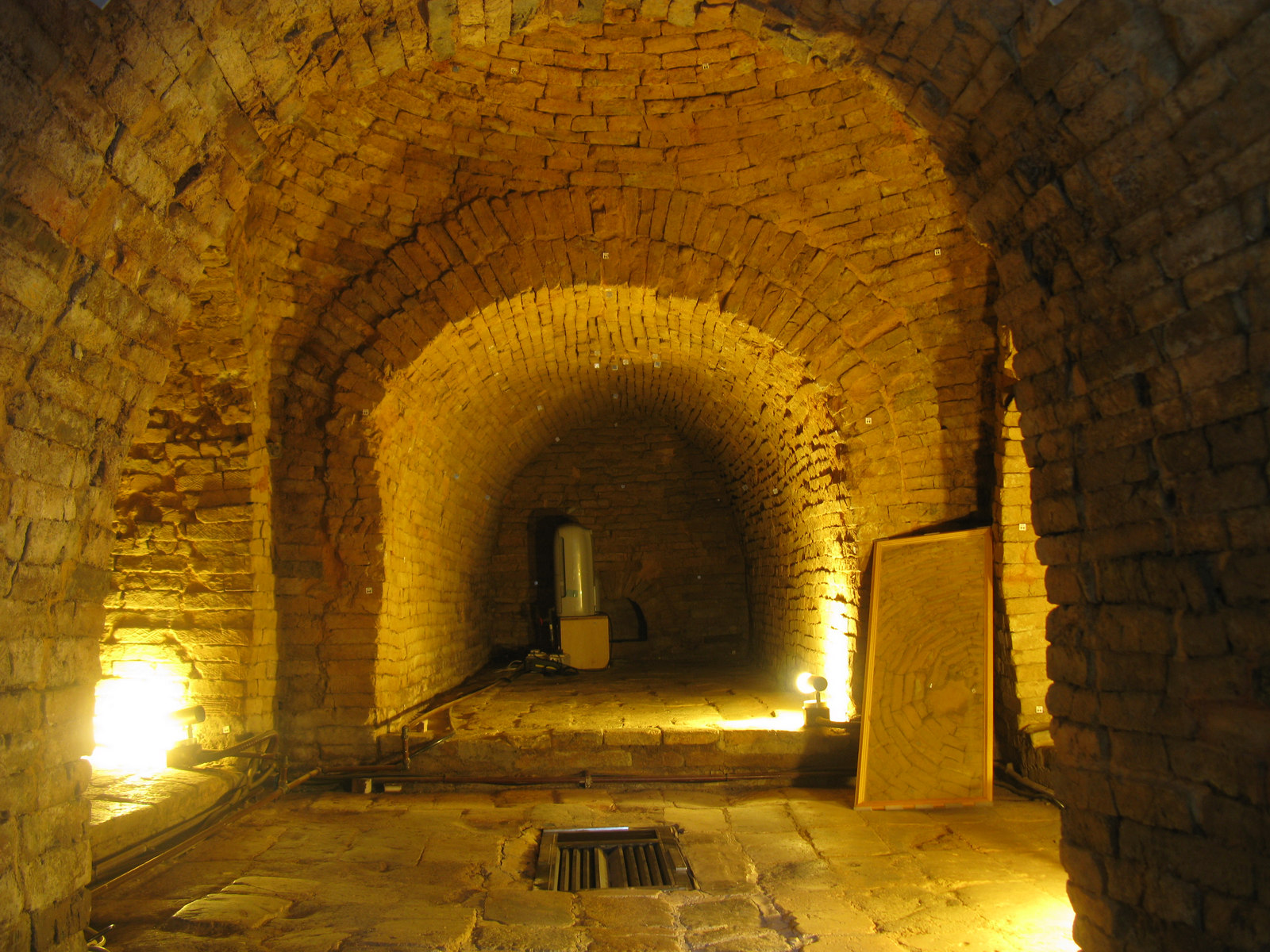
The Han Tomb's burial chamber.

== Local and Lingnan architecture ==
Prior to the British settlement of Hong Kong in 1841, architecture in Hong Kong was predominantly Cantonese. With the majority of the population being fishers at the mercy of typhoons and pirates, numerous Tin Hau temples were dedicated to their patron Goddess (女神) Mazu. Likewise farmers built fortified villages to defend themselves from bandits.

After the British established the entrepôt of Victoria City (now Central and Western District on Hong Kong Island), the local population increased substantially, and as a result Tong Lau (tenement common in Southern China, especially Lingnan) began to appear. These were three-to-four-storey buildings, tightly packed in city blocks, and combining Southern Chinese and European architectural elements. The ground floor were typically shops, with apartments and small balconies upstairs. These buildings had stairs but no elevators, and sometimes had no toilet facility. These Tong Lau remained the mainstay of Hong Kong architecture until at least World War II; a number of these building survive to this day, albeit often in a derelict state.

=== Hong Kong walled villages ===
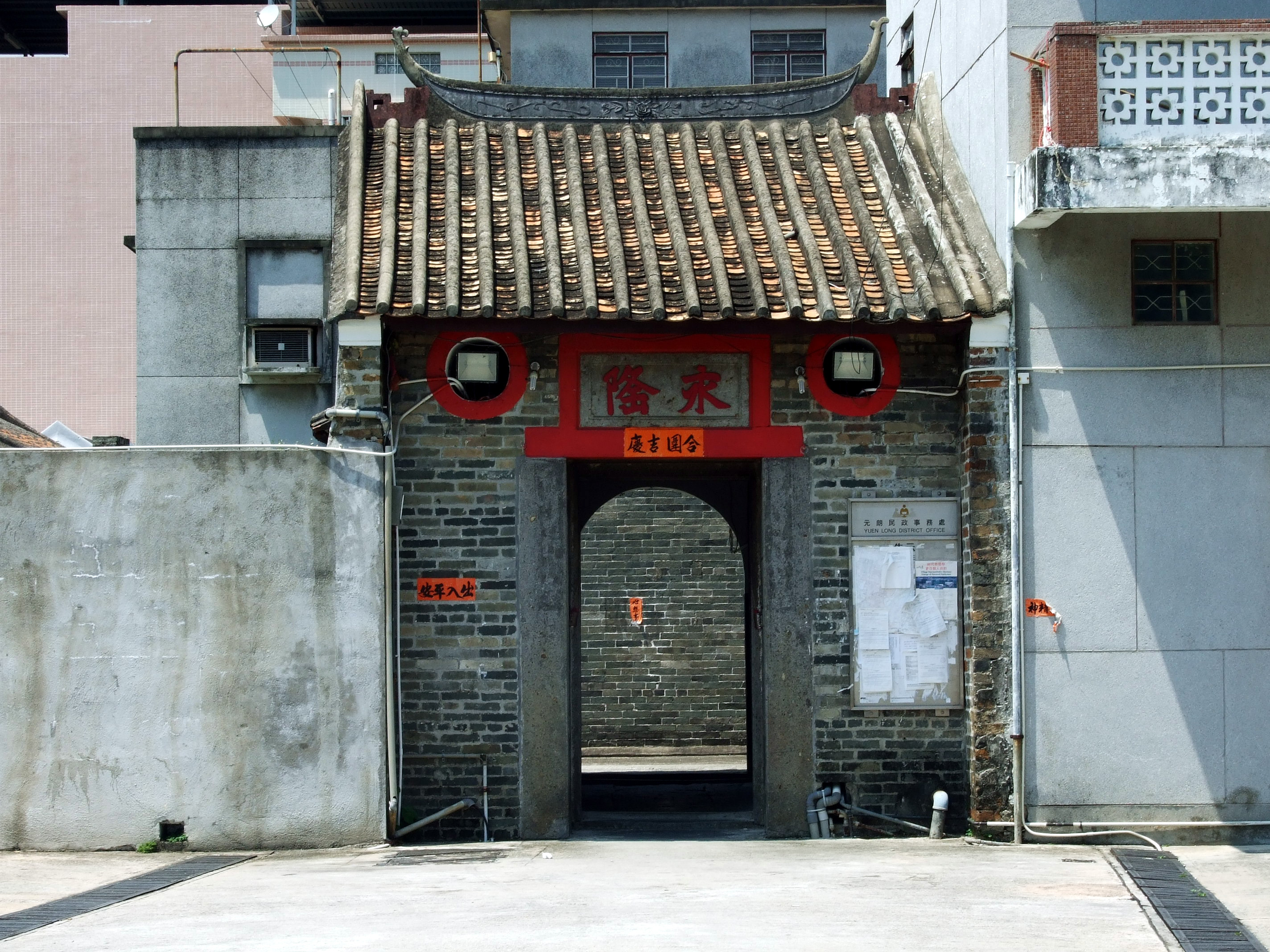

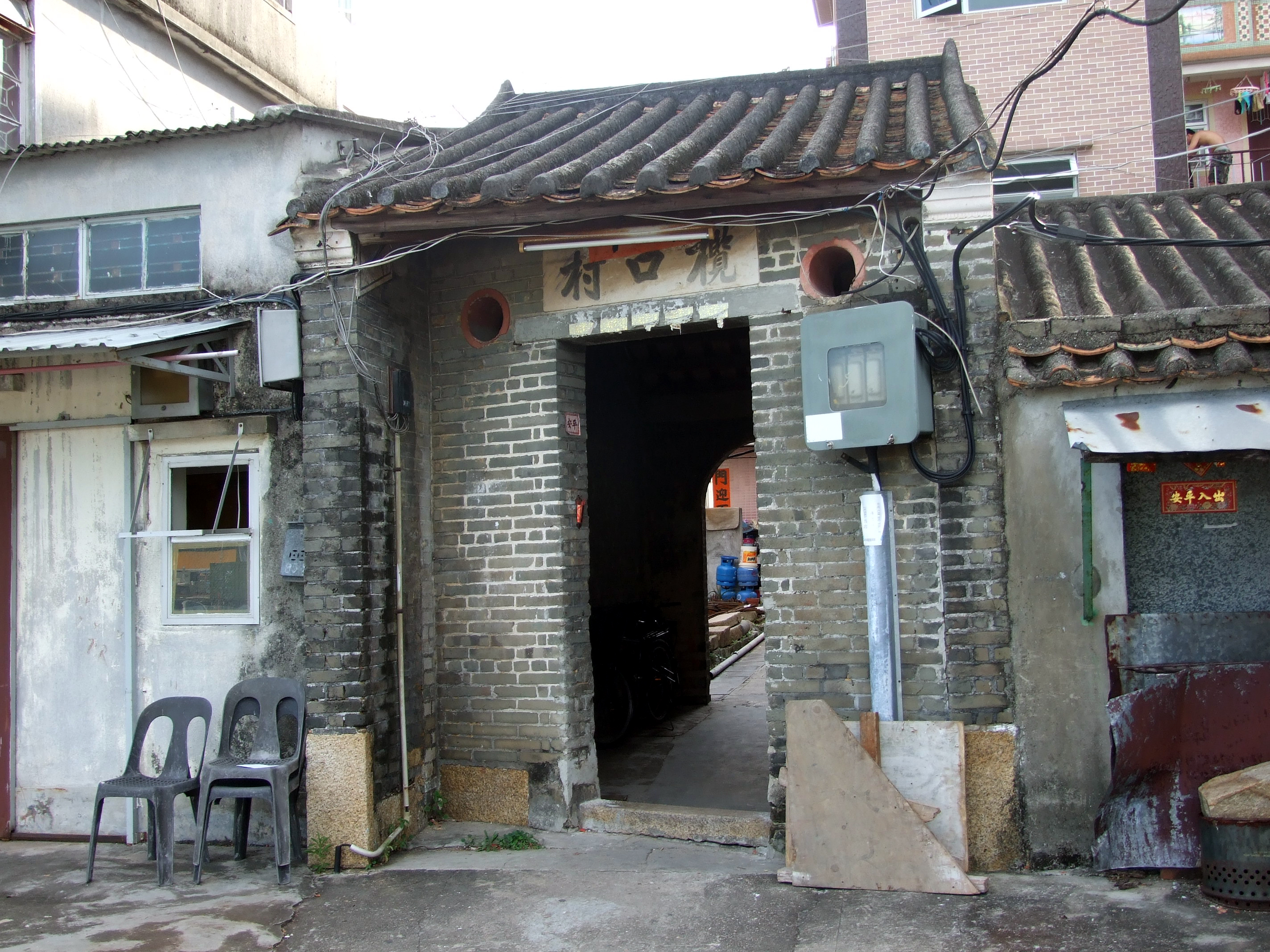

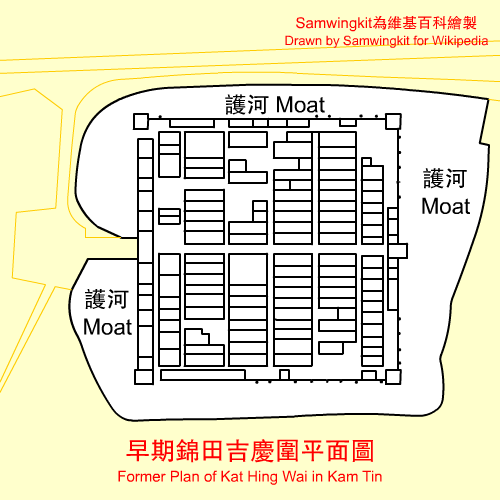
Walled villages are typically very orderly.

=== Pang uk ===
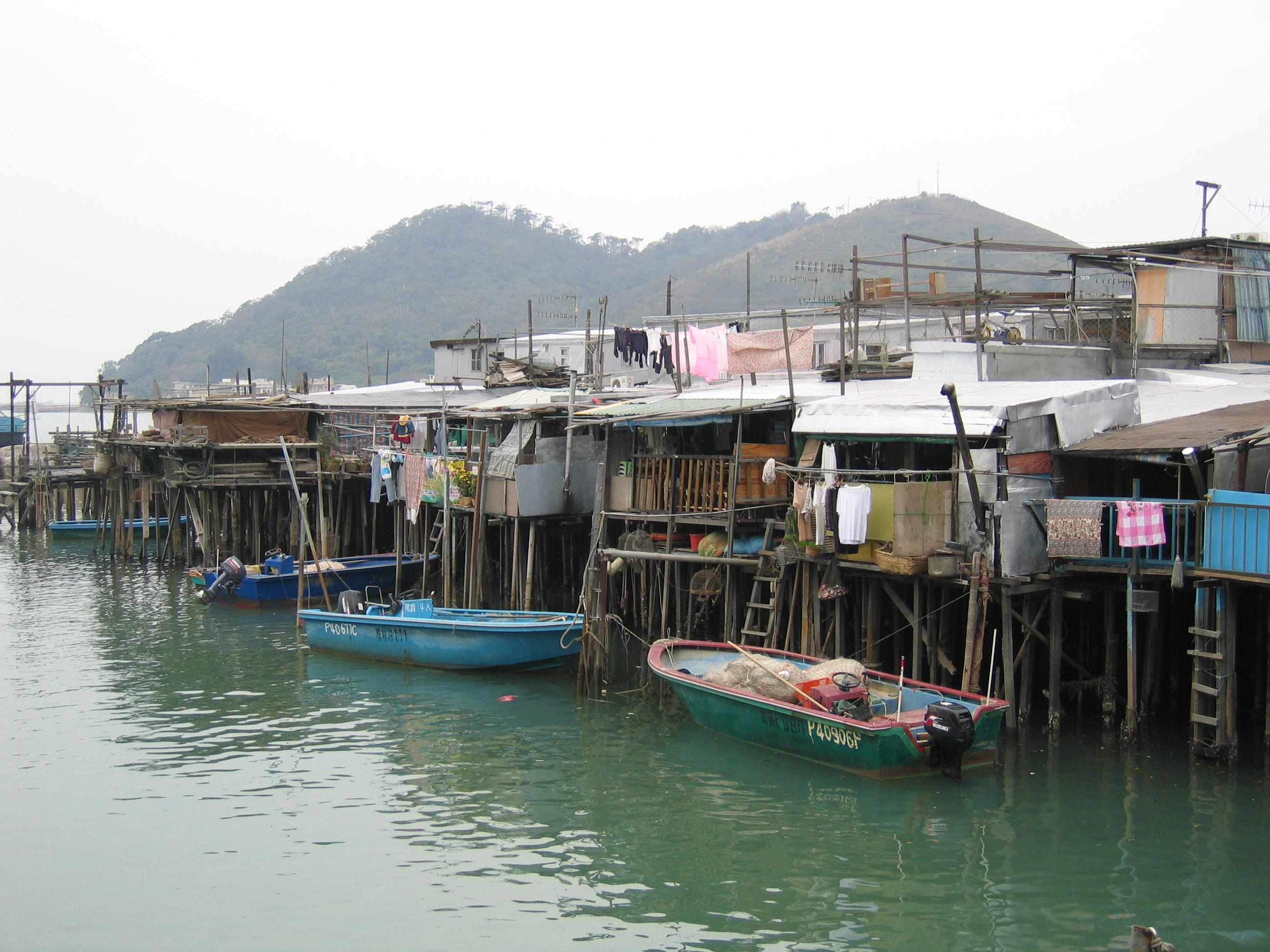
Pang uk in Tai O; Pang uk were built by Tanka people due to their traditions of living above water.

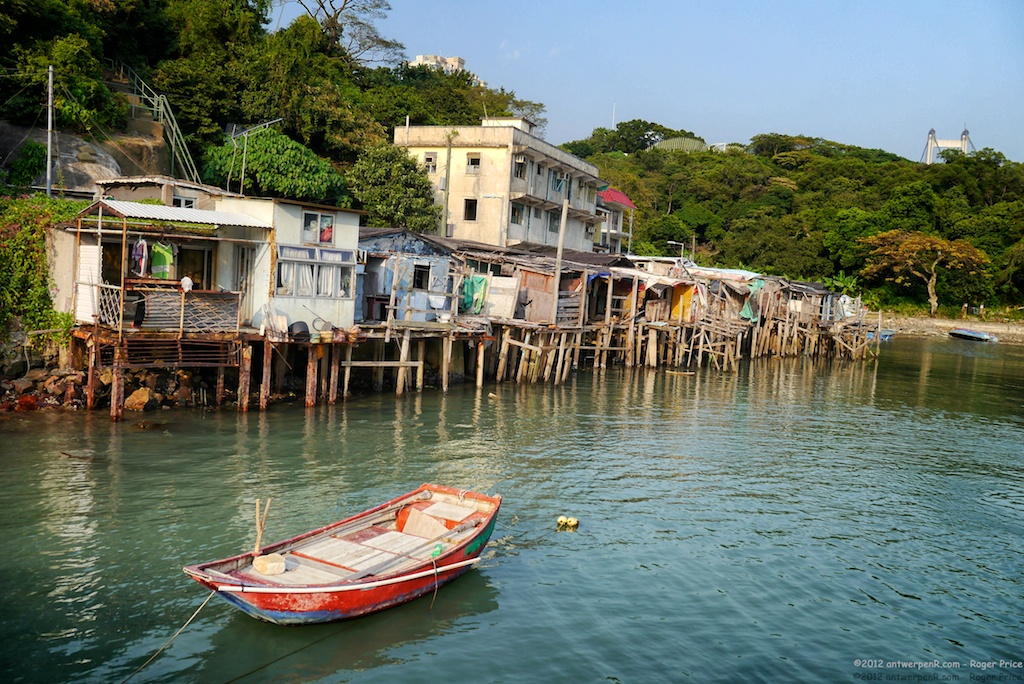
Pang uk in Ma Wan.

=== Classical Lingnan architecture in Hong Kong ===
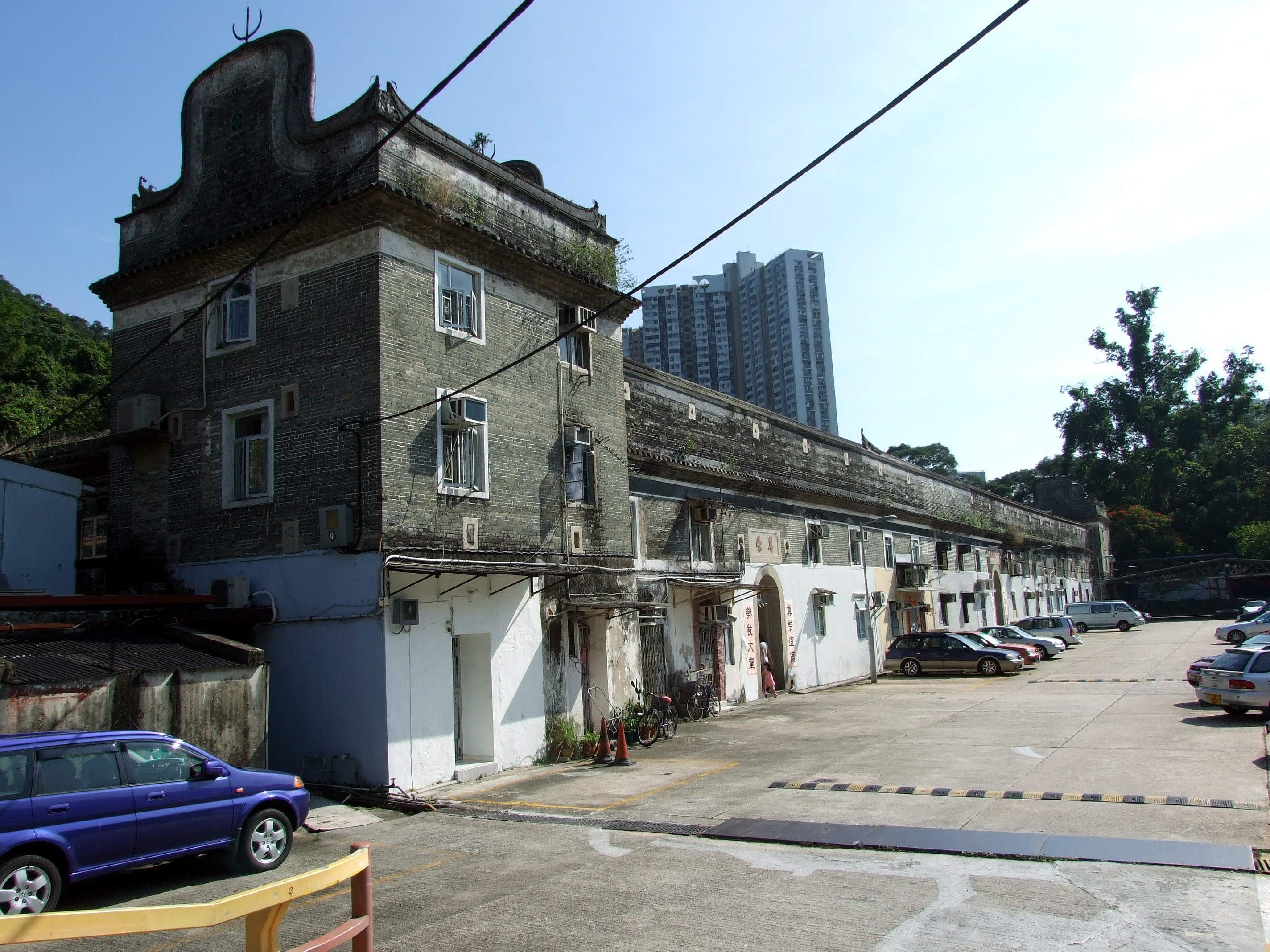
Tsang Tai Uk; It is a distinctively Lingnan building, with the use of "wok yi uk" (walls protruding vertically from both ends of the roof).

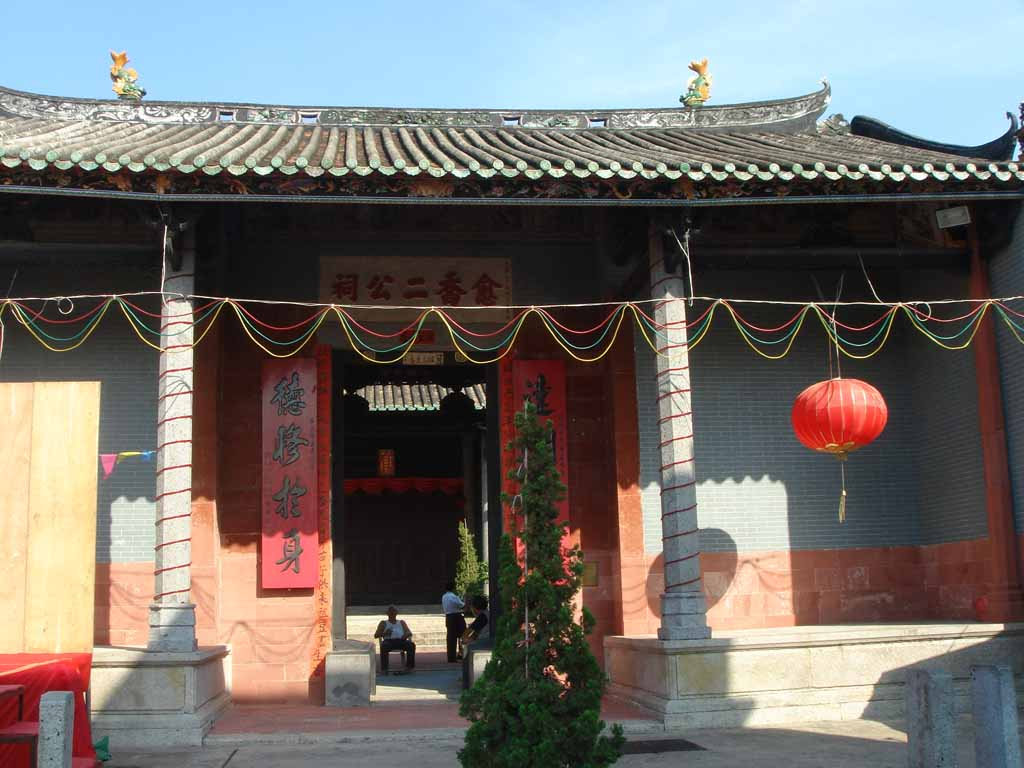
The Yu Kiu ancestral hall in Yuen Long.

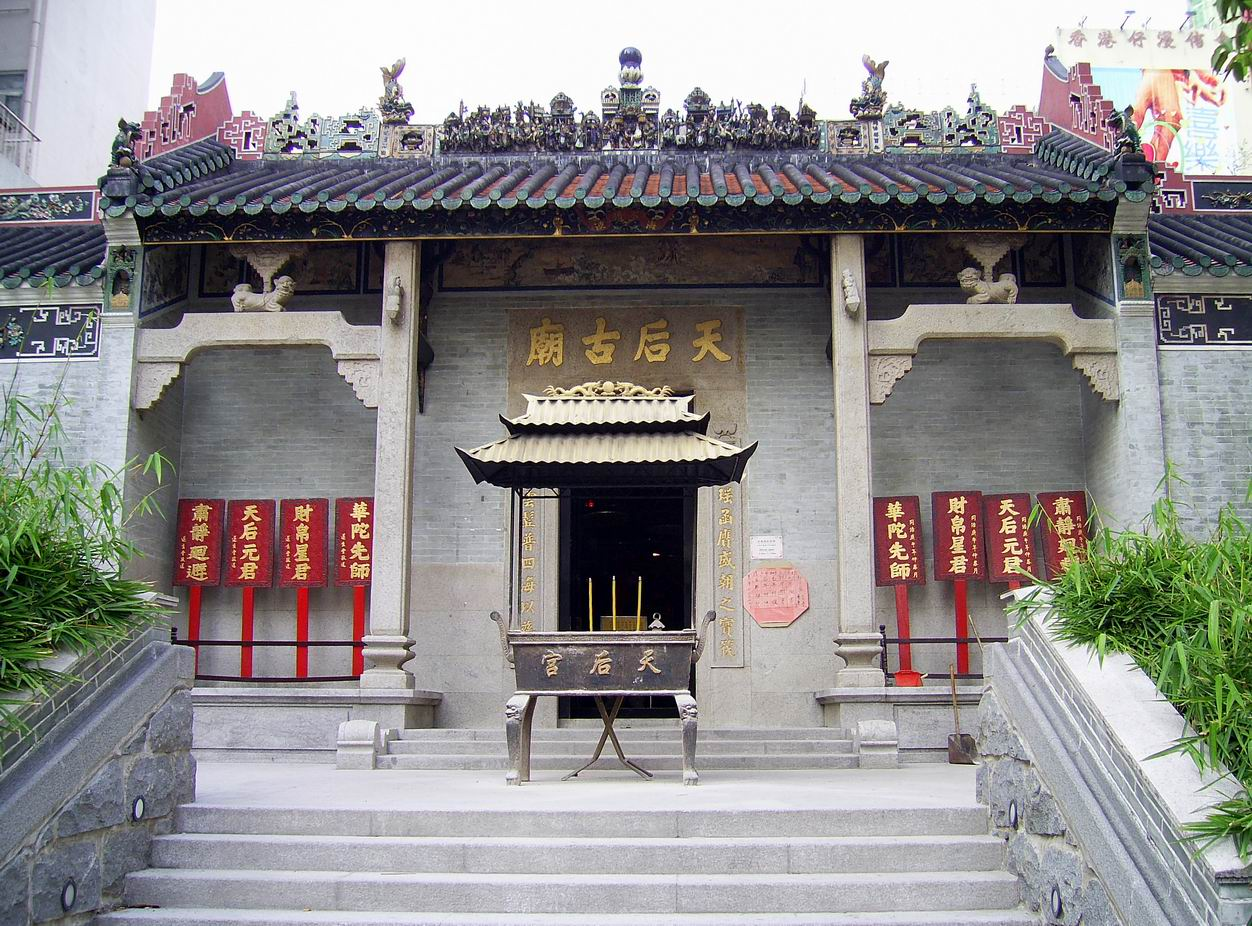
A Mazu Temple in Shek Pai Wan. Mazu is a Taoist sea goddess venerated by Cantonese and Hoklo.

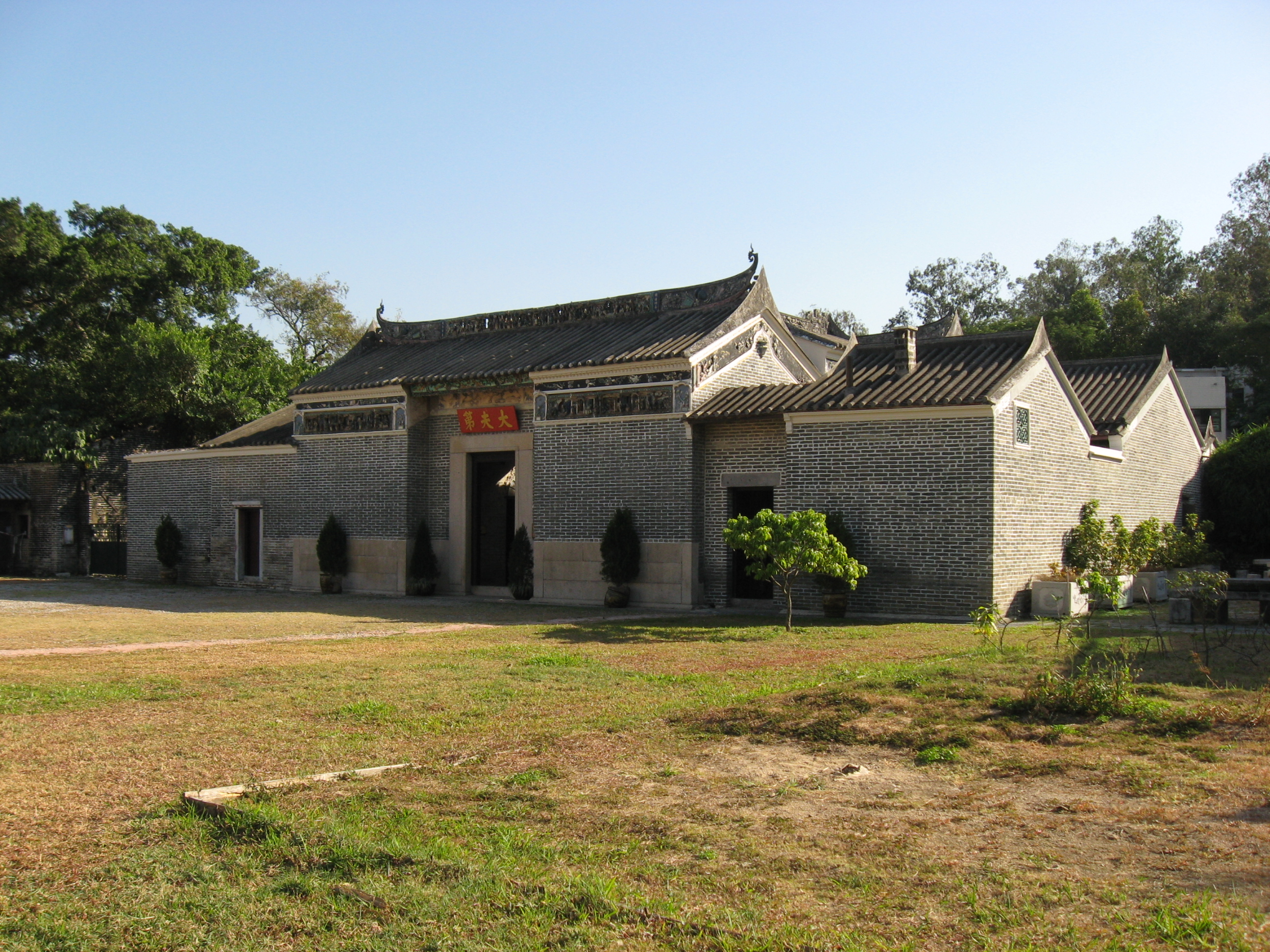
The Tai Fu Tai Mansion is a strongly Cantonese building.

=== Tong laus in Hong Kong ===
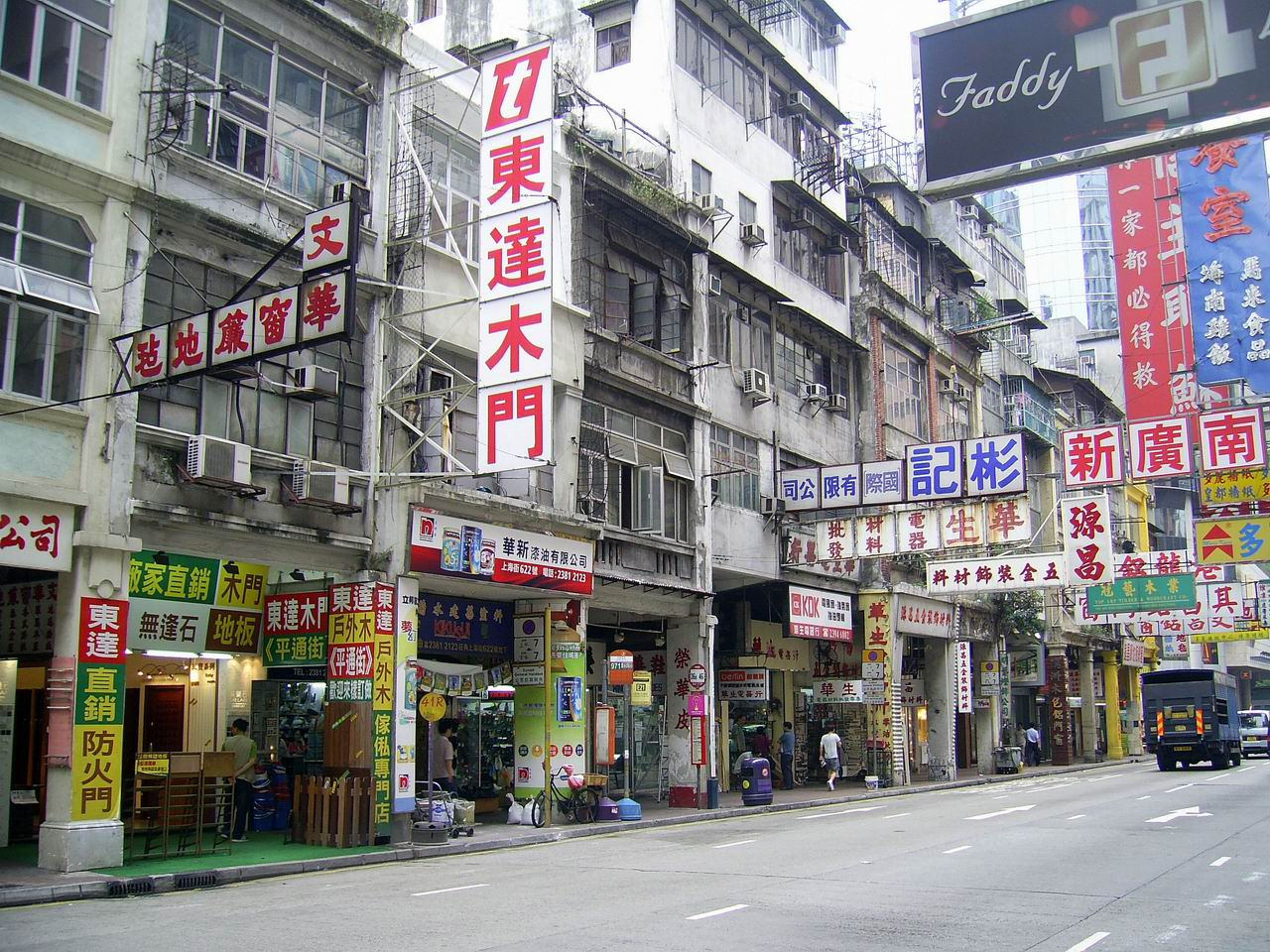

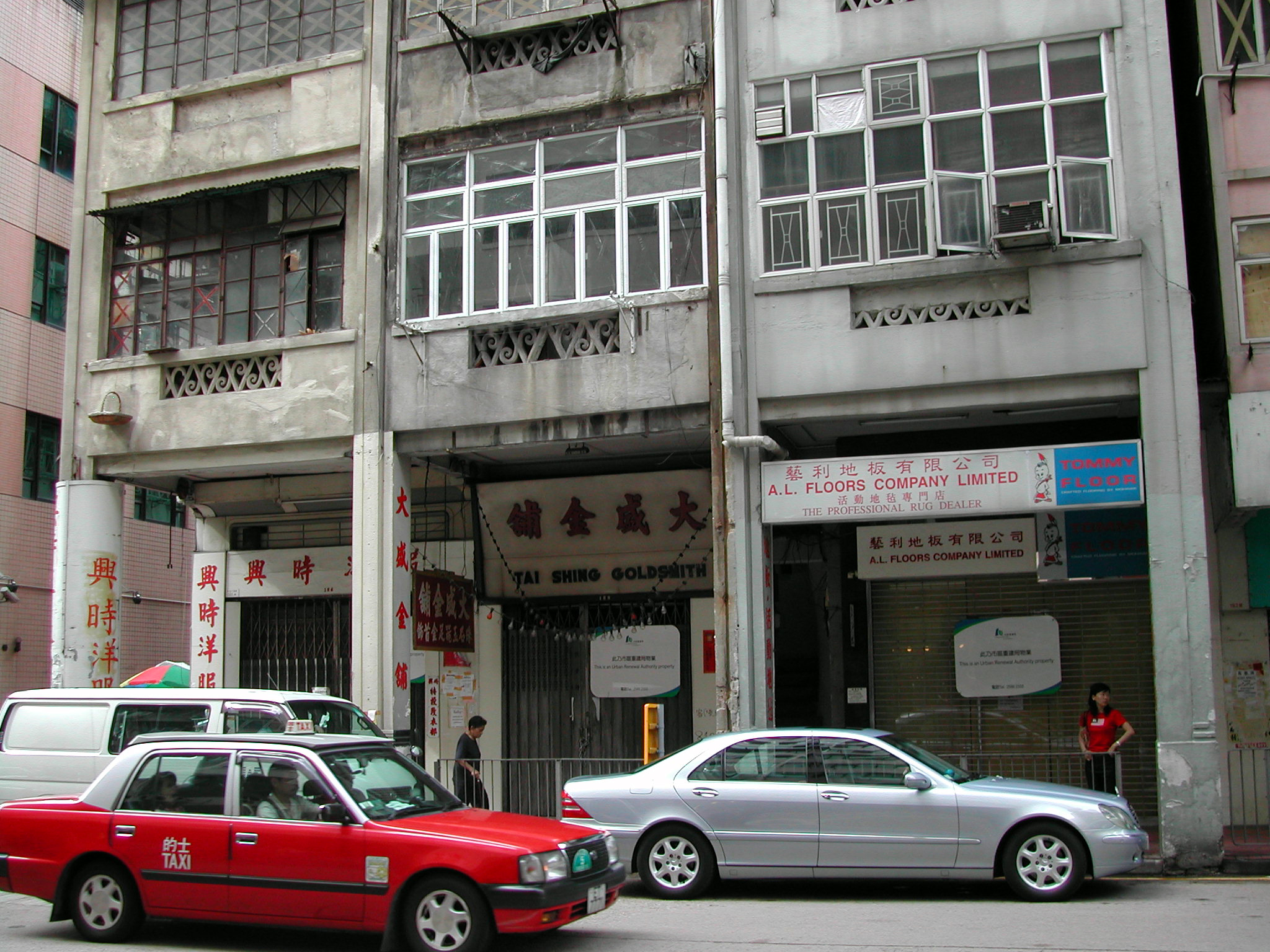

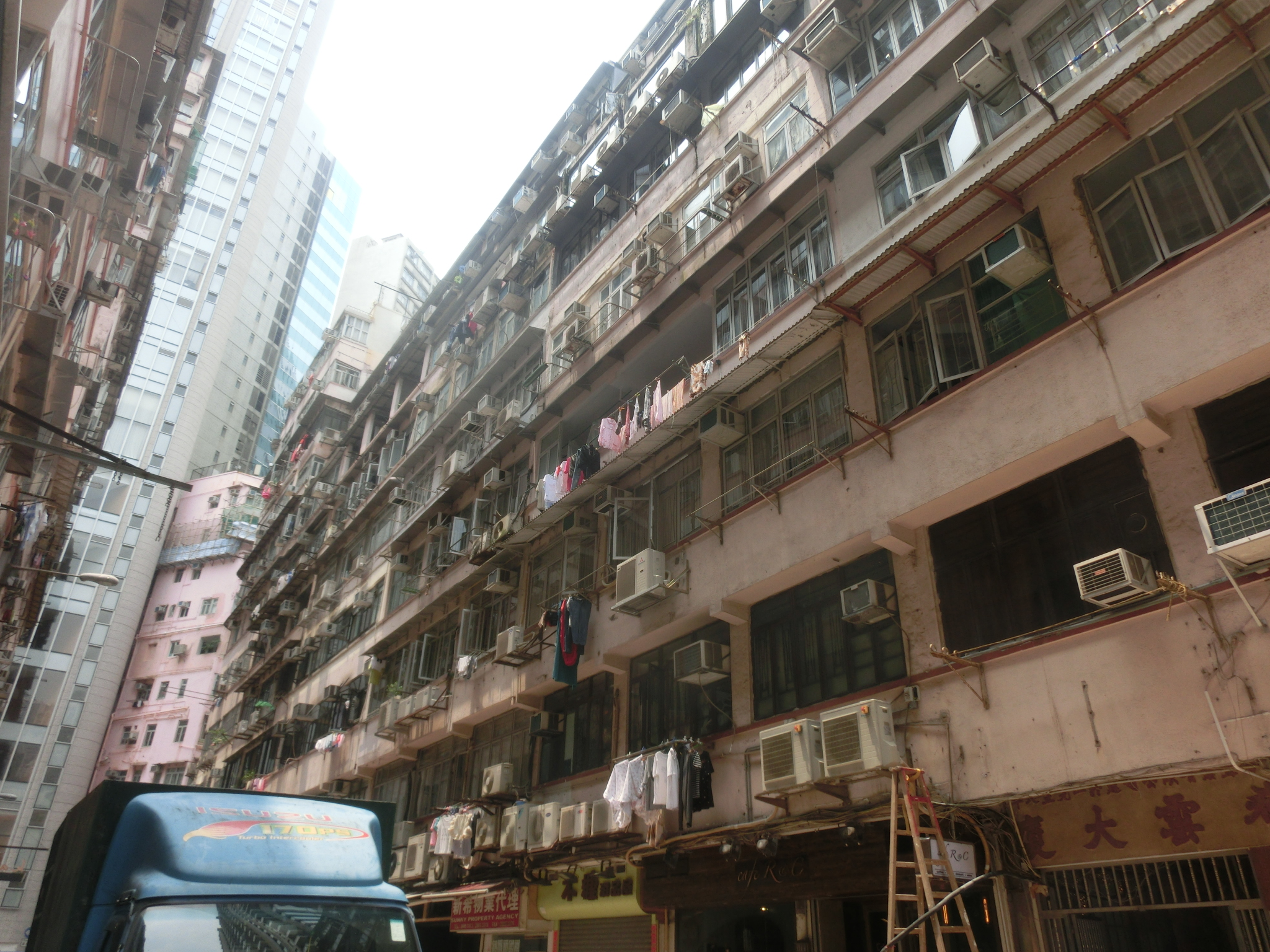

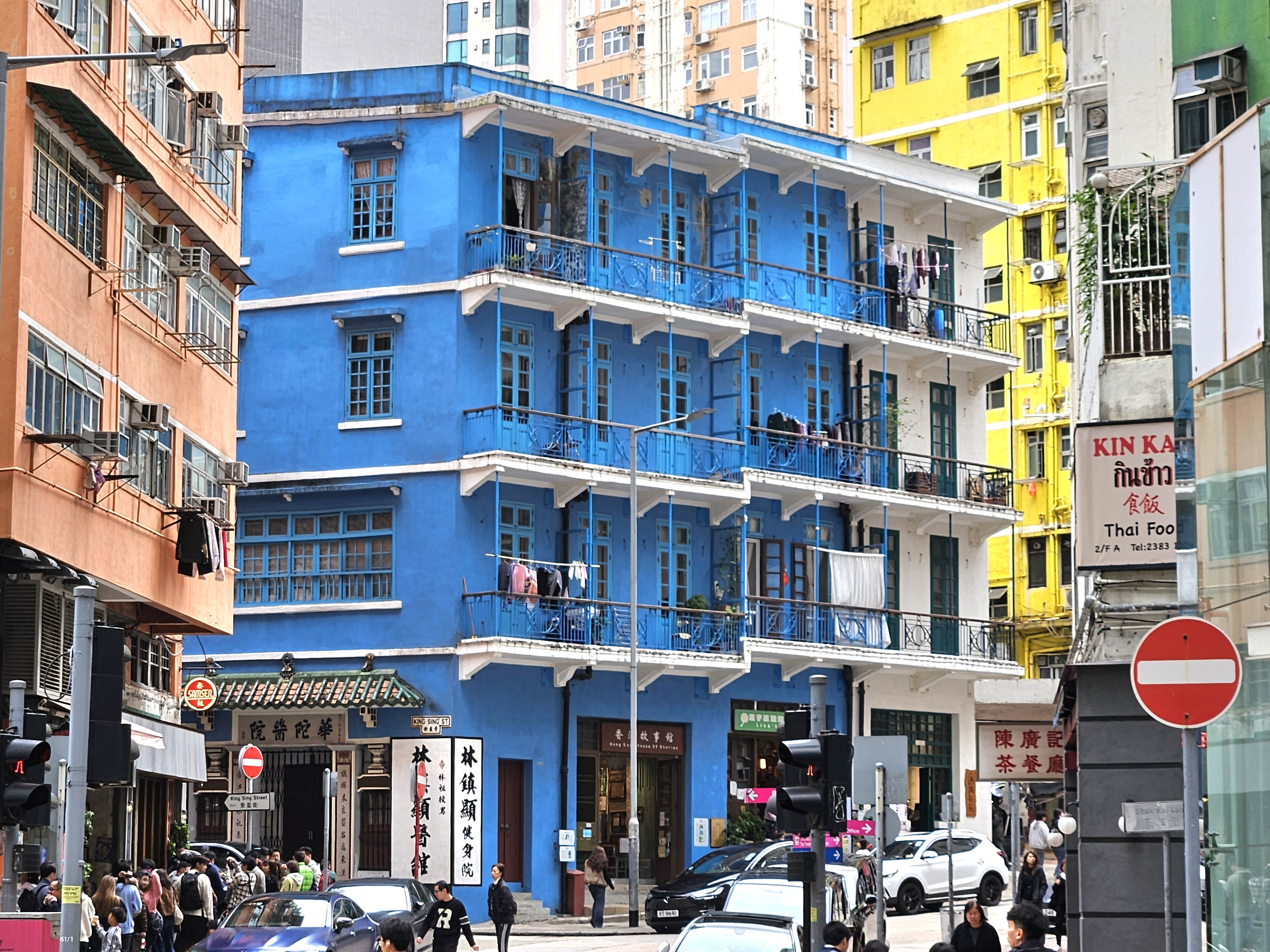

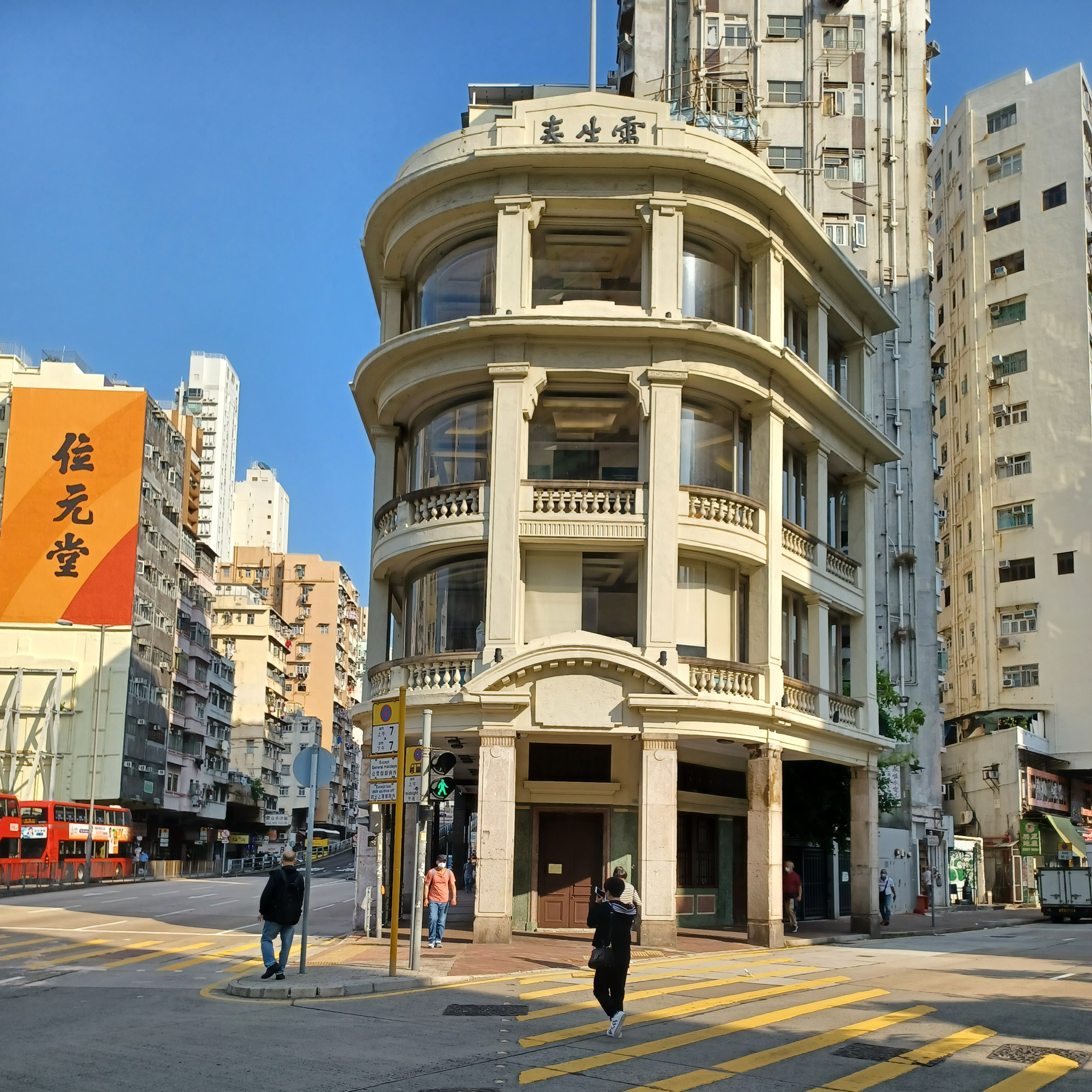

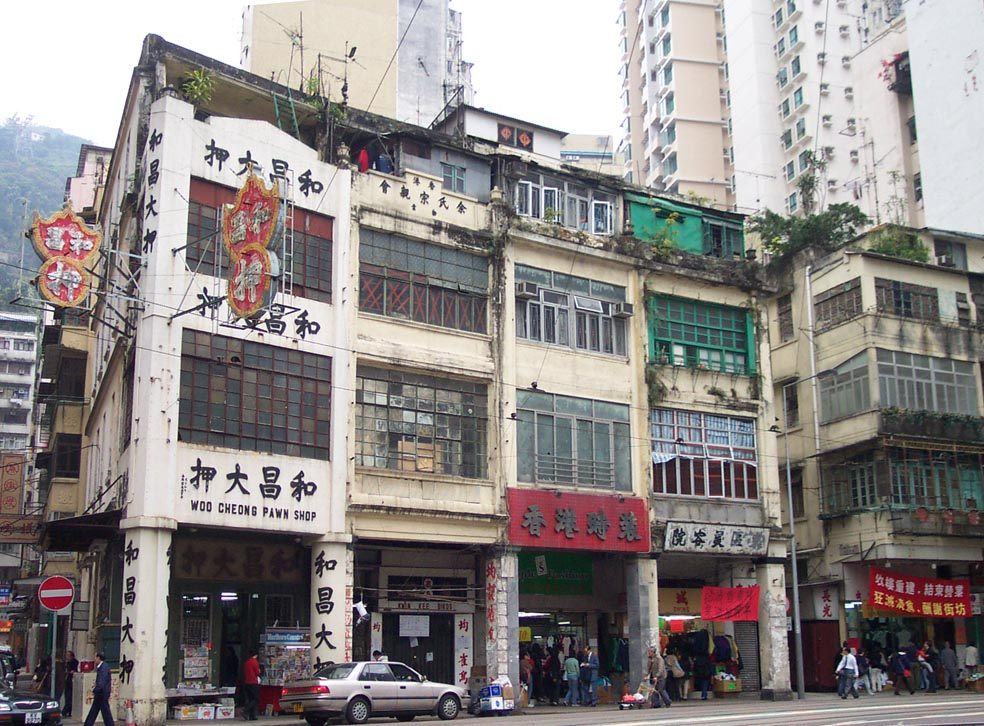

== British architecture ==
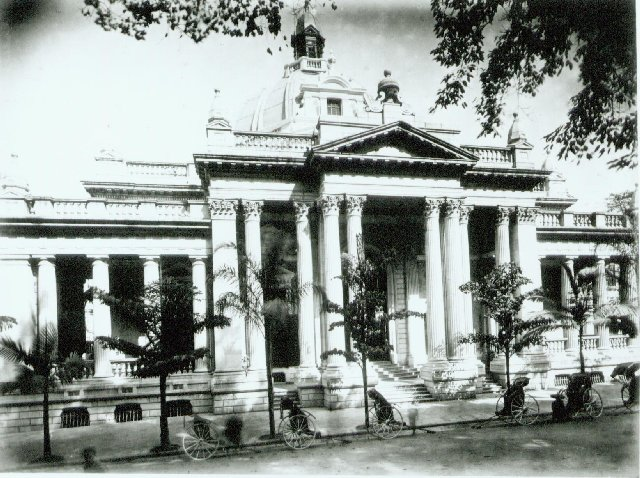
The headquarters of the Hongkong and Shanghai Banking Corporation Limited in 1890

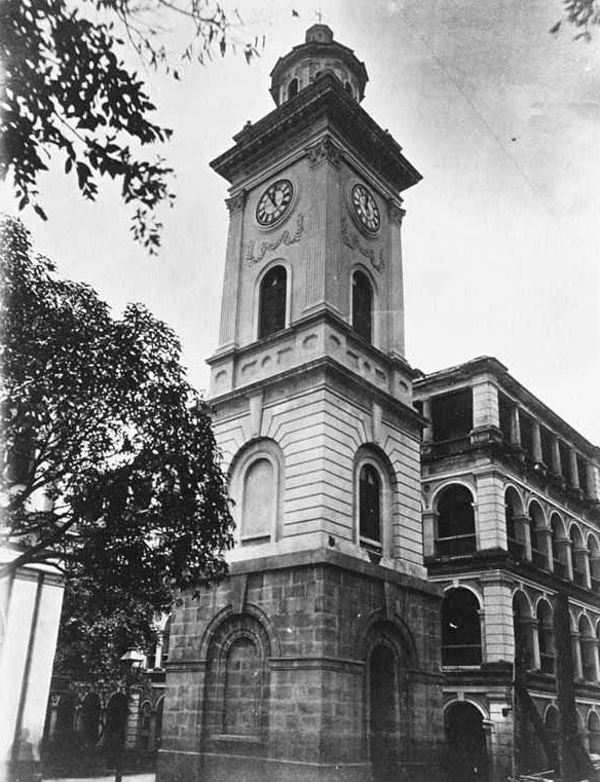
Pedder Street Clocktower

Meanwhile, the British introduced Victorian and Edwardian architectural styles from the mid-19th century onwards. Notable surviving examples include the Legislative Council Building, the Central Police Station and Murray House. One building that has since been demolished was the Hong Kong Club Building; it was built atop a smaller structure designed in Italian Renaissance Revival style in 1897. The building was the subject of a bitter heritage conservation struggle in the late 1970s, which ultimately failed to save the building.

The first building in Hong Kong to be classified as the first high rise was constructed between June 1904 and December 1905. It consisted of 5 major buildings, each stacking 5 to 6 stories high. The structures were raised by the Hongkong Land under Catchick Paul Chater and James Johnstone Keswick.

Most high-rise buildings to be built afterwards were for business purposes; the first true skyscraper in Hong Kong was built for HongkongBank in 1935, which was also the first building in Hong Kong to have air conditioning; however this has since been replaced with the HSBC Main Building, Hong Kong of 1985. Likewise the few examples of 1930s Streamline Moderne and Bauhaus architecture in Hong Kong, such as the Central Market and the Wan Chai Market, are facing imminent demolitions despite protests from heritage conservation groups.

In the residential sector, multi-story buildings did not appear until the Buildings Ordinance 1955 lifted the height limit of residential buildings. This change was necessitated by the massive influx of refugees into Hong Kong after the conclusion of the Chinese Communist Revolution in 1949, and the subsequent Shek Kip Mei slum fire in 1953. Public housing estates, originally seven-storeys high with notoriously cramped conditions, public bathrooms and no kitchens, were hastily built to accommodate the homeless; meanwhile private apartments, still tightly packed into city blocks like the Tong Lau of old, had grown to over 20 stories high by the mid-1960s.

The private housing estate began in 1965 with Mei Foo Sun Chuen. The first major private construction came from Swire properties in 1972 with the development of middle-class estate of Taikoo Shing. With little space wasted on statues or landmarks that consumed unnecessary real estate, Taikoo Shing's design was the new standard.

=== Gallery ===
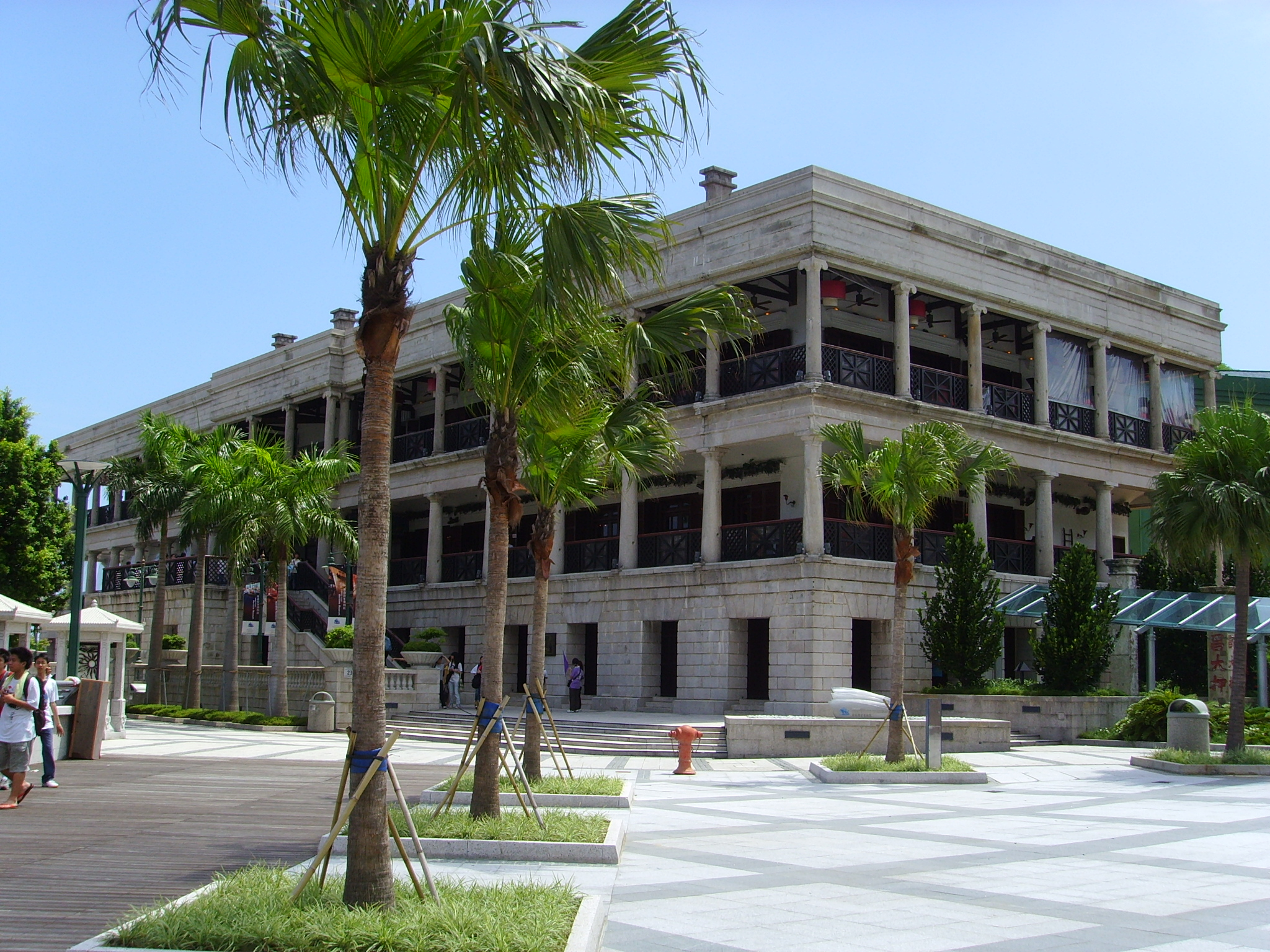
Murray House

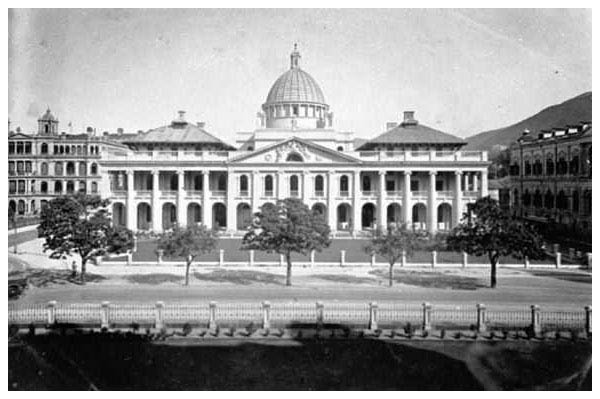
Court of Final Appeal

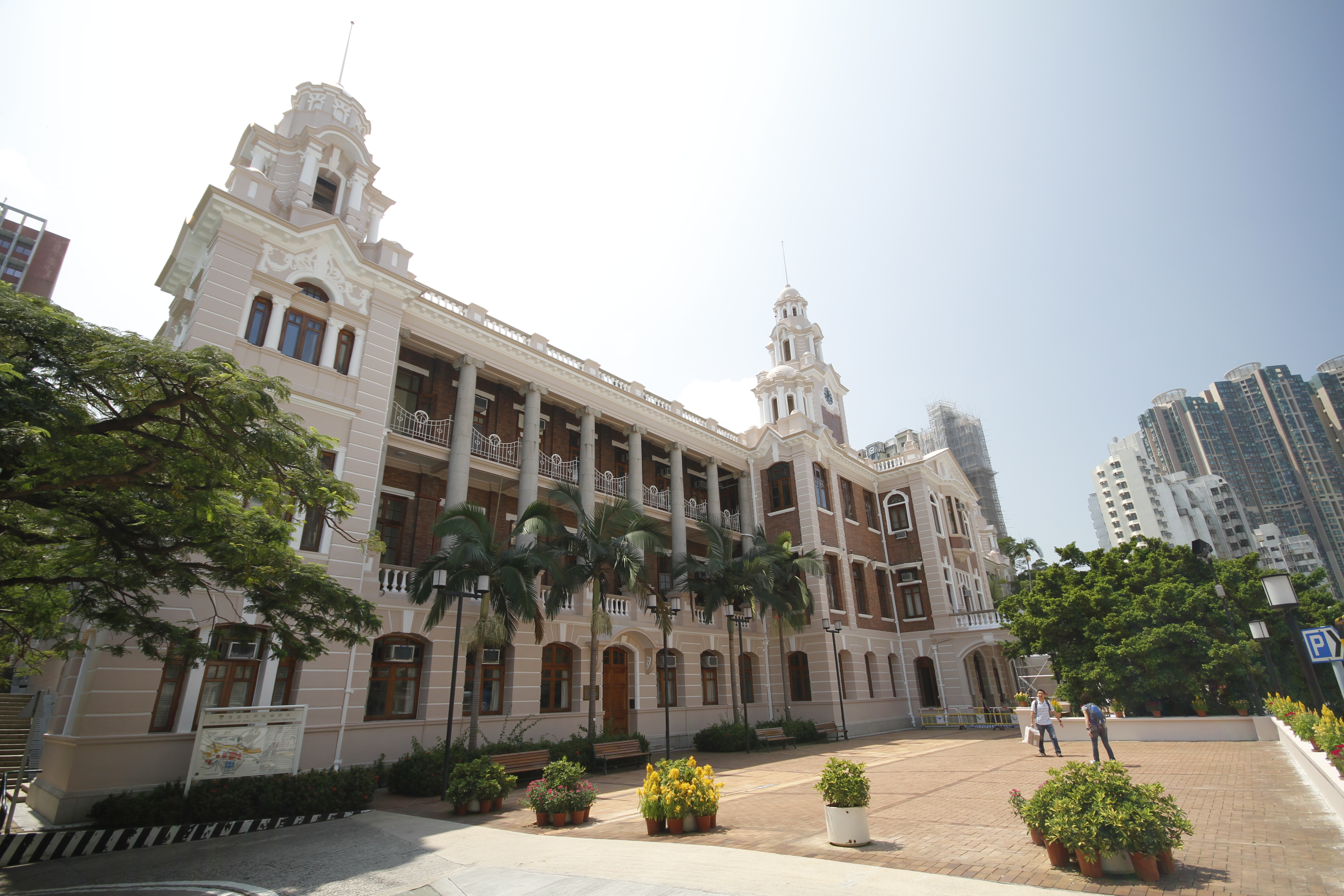
Main building of University of Hong Kong

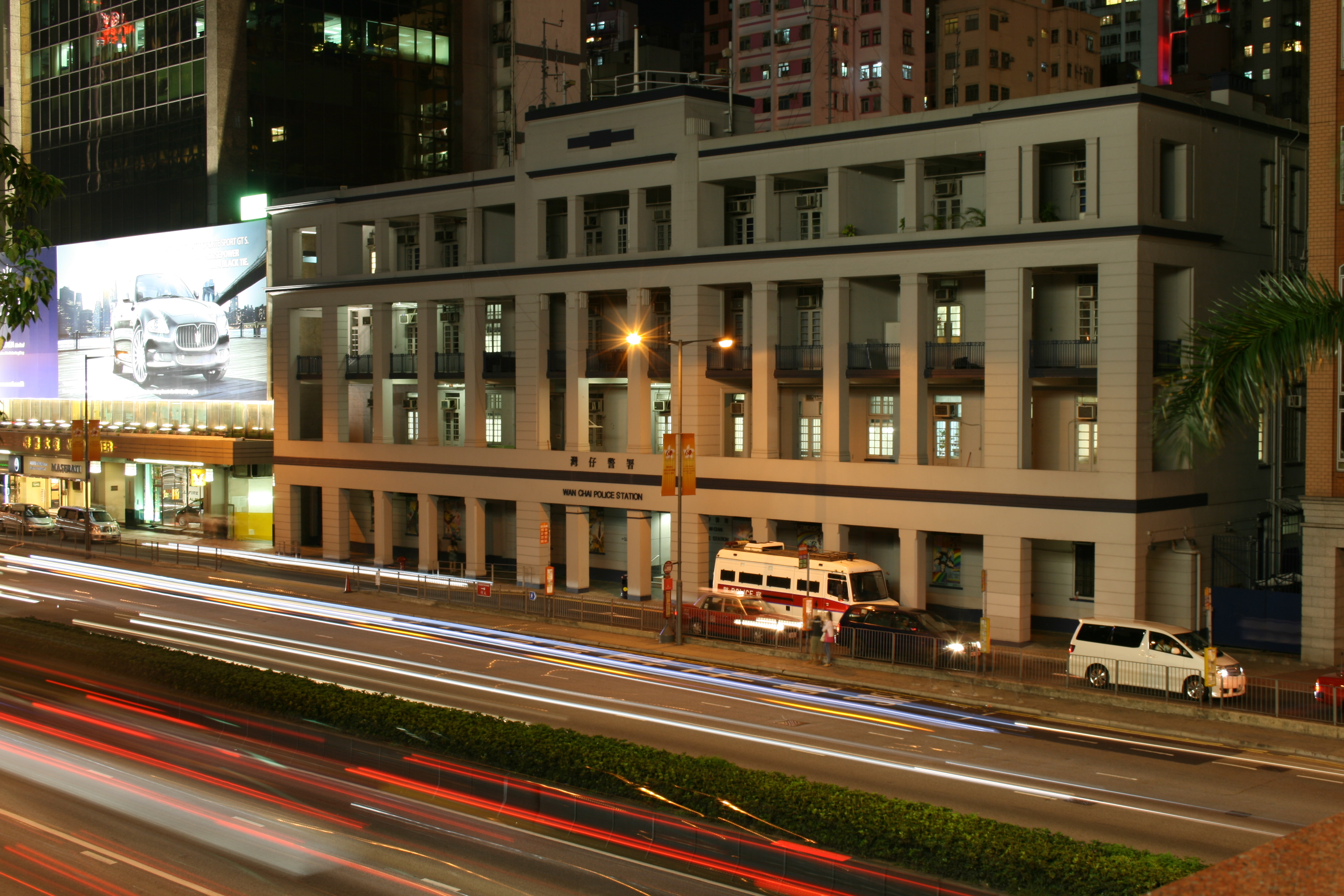
Old Wan Chai Police Station (which now houses the International Organisation of Mediation)

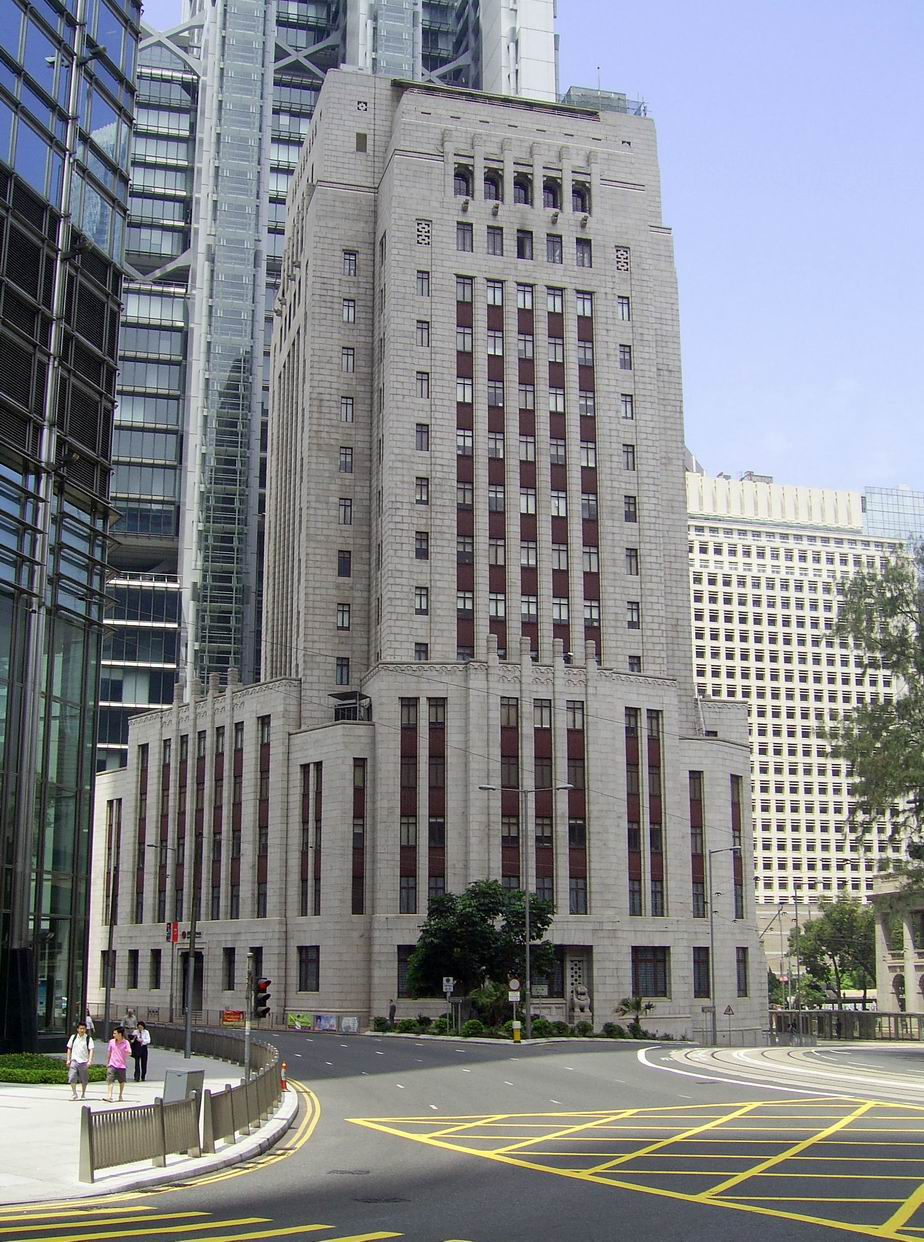
Old Bank of China Building

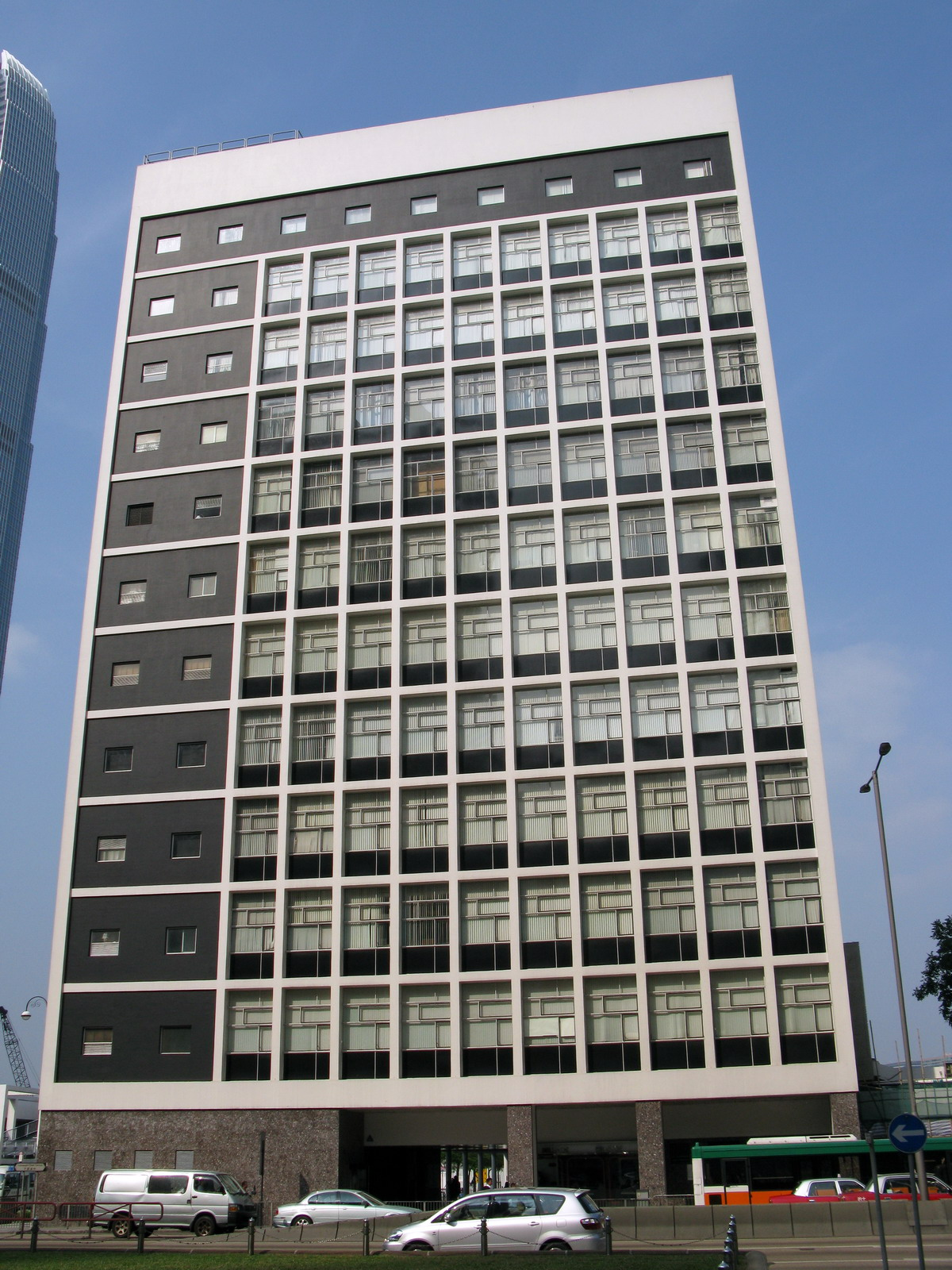
Hong Kong City Hall

== Contemporary architecture ==
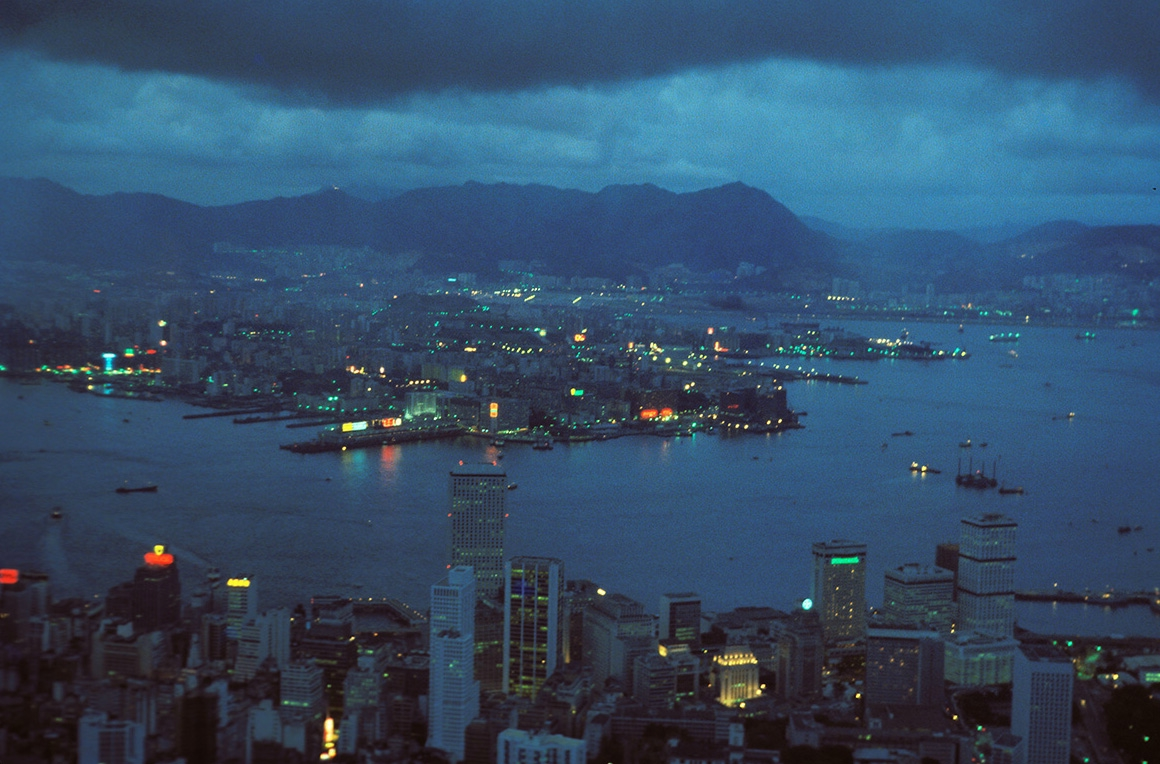
The Hong Kong skyline in 1978

In the late 1990s, the primary demand for high-end buildings was in and around Central. The buildings of Central comprise the skyline along the coast of the Victoria Harbour, a famous tourist attraction in Hong Kong. But until Kai Tak Airport closed in 1998, strict height restrictions were in force in Kowloon so that aeroplanes could come in to land. These restrictions have now been lifted and many new skyscrapers in Kowloon have been constructed, including the International Commerce Centre at the West Kowloon reclamation, which has been the tallest building in Hong Kong since its completion in 2010.

Many commercial and residential towers built in the past two decades are among the tallest in the world, including Highcliff, The Arch, and The Harbourside. Still, more towers are under construction, like One Island East. At present, Hong Kong has the world's biggest skyline with a total of 7,681 skyscrapers, placing it ahead of even New York City, despite the fact that New York is larger in area. Most of these were built in past two decades.

Many skyscrapers in Hong Kong feature holes in them called "dragon gates". Local folklore claims that such holes are for dragons to pass through, though some such holes are created to fulfil air ventilation requirements.

Hong Kong's best-known building is probably I. M. Pei's Bank of China Tower. The building attracted heated controversy from the moment its design was released to the public, which continued for years after the building's completion in 1990. The building was said to cast negative feng shui energy into the heart of Hong Kong due to the building's sharp angles. One rumour even went so far as to say that the negative energy was concentrated on the Government House as a Chinese plot to foil any decisions taken there. The two white aerials on top on the building were deemed inauspicious as two sticks of incense are burned for the dead.

One of the largest construction projects in Hong Kong has been the new Hong Kong International Airport on Chek Lap Kok near Lantau, which was the most extensive single civil engineering project ever undertaken. Designed by Sir Norman Foster, the huge land reclamation project is linked to the centre of Hong Kong by the Lantau Link, which features three new major bridges: the world's sixth largest suspension bridge, Tsing Ma, which was built in 1997, connecting the islands of Tsing Yi and Ma Wan; the world's longest cable-stayed bridge carrying both road and railway traffic, Kap Shui Mun, which links Ma Wan and Lantau; and the world's first major 4-span cable-stayed bridge, Ting Kau, which connects Tsing Yi and the mainland New Territories.

== Recent trends ==
In recent years, the new architecture in Hong Kong focuses on providing more public green spaces that combine environmentally friendly concepts with cultural exchanges, aiming to improve the quality of life for the city's people. Besides green space, there are also developments of unused spaces by turning them into cultural hubs. Architects have also explored more energy-efficient design.

=== West Kowloon Cultural District ===
Located at the headland of Kowloon is the West Kowloon Waterfront Promenade. Along the boardwalk are Hong Kong's iconic waterfront scenes. The promenade includes an area for cultural exchanges, where live music is played during the weekends. A cycling and jogging path provide citizens a view of the harbour while doing exercises.

=== PMQ ===
A design hub which utilises old, unused spaces to create platforms for a variety of start-ups to showcase their best innovations and products for the public to get access to. After two years of renovations, the former police married quarters in Aberdeen Street, Central, has been renamed PMQ.

PMQ offers a wide range of expansive shared spaces, including a multi-purpose hall, a courtyard and market area, a library, and beautifully landscaped open areas. These facilities serve as venues for exhibitions, various events, collaborations, and interactions among designers, entrepreneurs, and the general public.

=== Hong Kong Science Park ===
The Hong Kong Science Park is a project which is set to promote high end technologies and innovation ideas exchange. The development is a key infrastructure projects that integrates with Hong Kong's advancement as a regional hub for high-tech innovation. The Hong Kong Science Park is located at Tolo Harbour and comprises three phases. Phase I site is divided into three zones: Core, Corporate and Campus. The Core Zone is centrally located and consists of communal and recreational facilities, meeting and conference rooms, exhibition halls, shops, dining areas as well as office spaces for small size companies. The Corporate Zone is located along the waterfront and is reserved for large size corporate companies who wish to operate in a building solely owned by them. The Campus Zone is situated by the Tolo Highway and is designed to accommodate medium size companies in multi-tenants buildings.

== Gallery ==
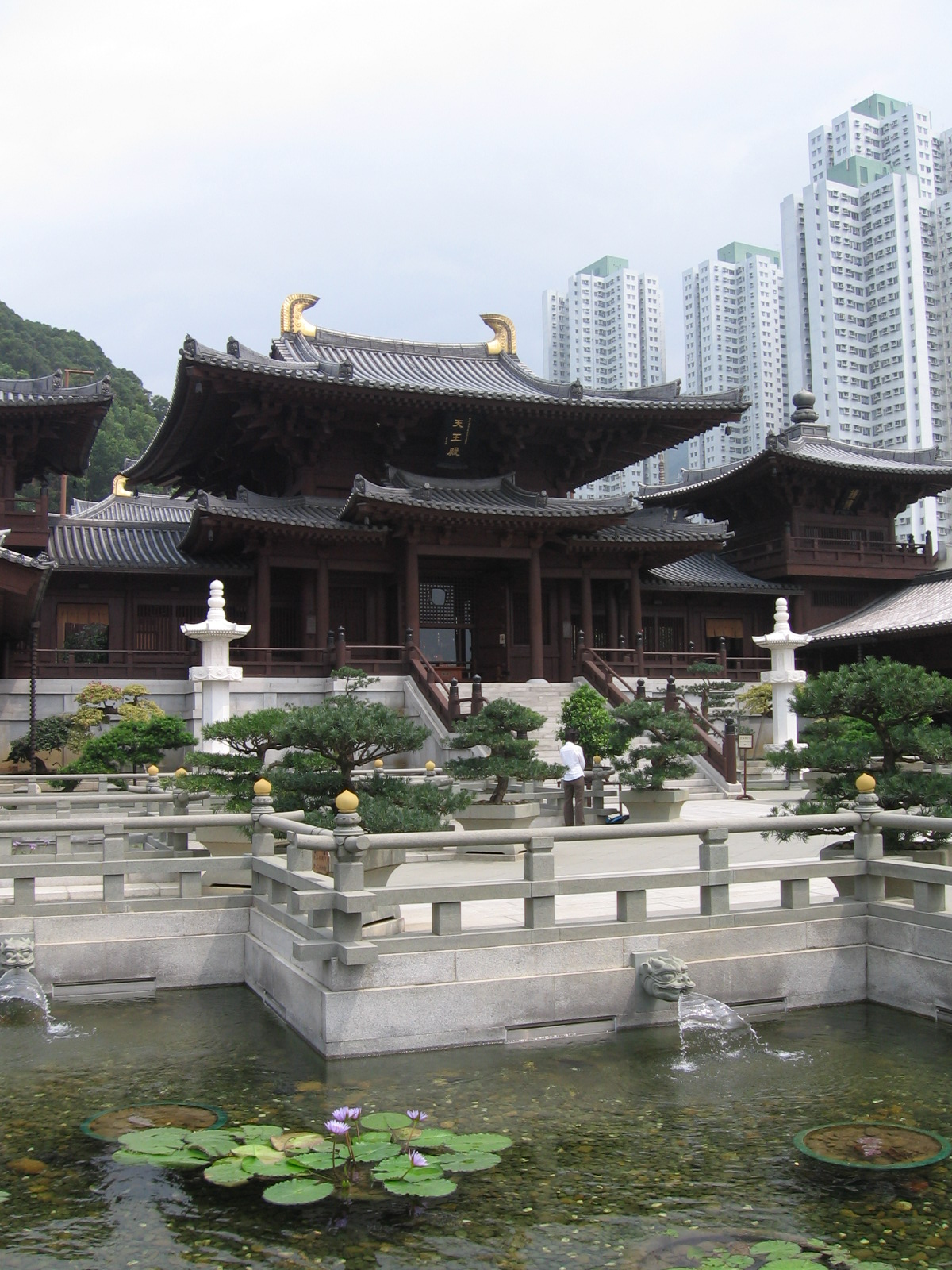
Chi Lin Nunnery in Diamond Hill, Kowloon, uses Tang-style architecture.

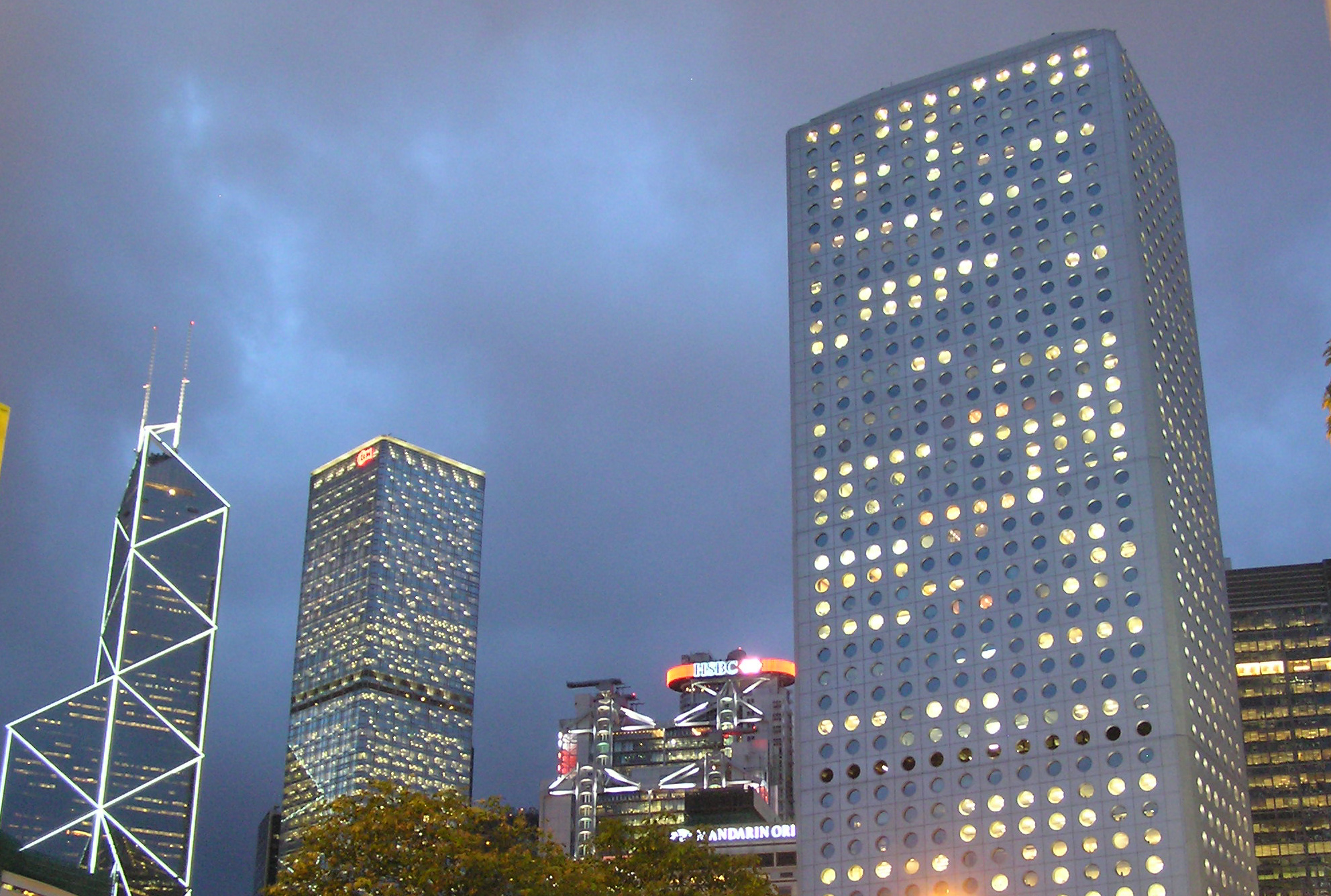
High-rise commercial buildings in Central, Hong Kong—from the left to the right: the BOC Tower, Cheung Kong Center, HSBC Building and Jardine House

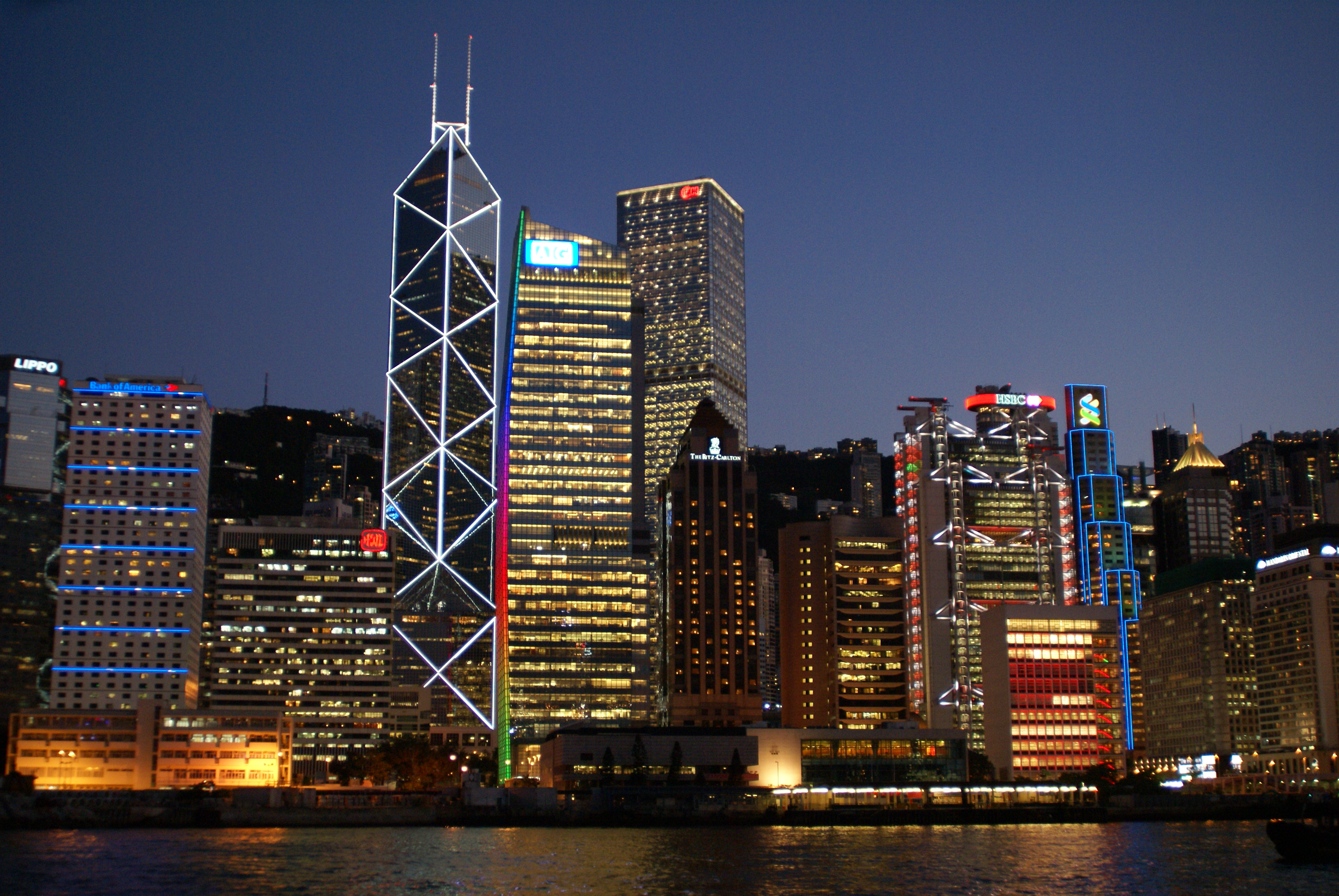
View of Hong Kong Financial District at night.

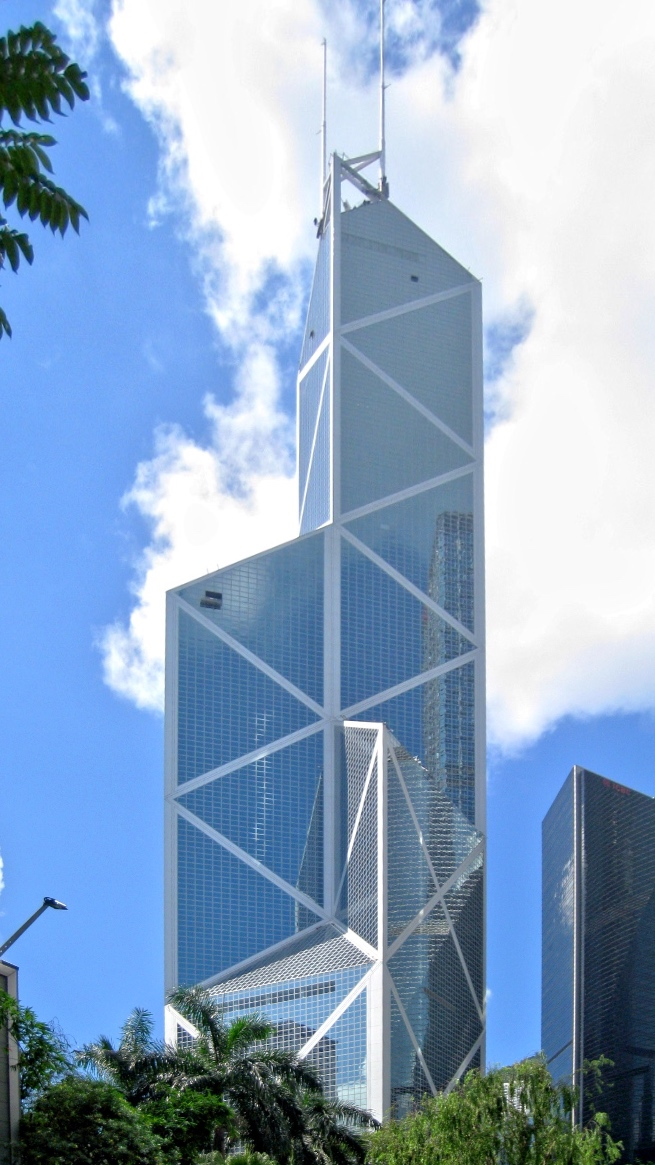
Bank of China Tower

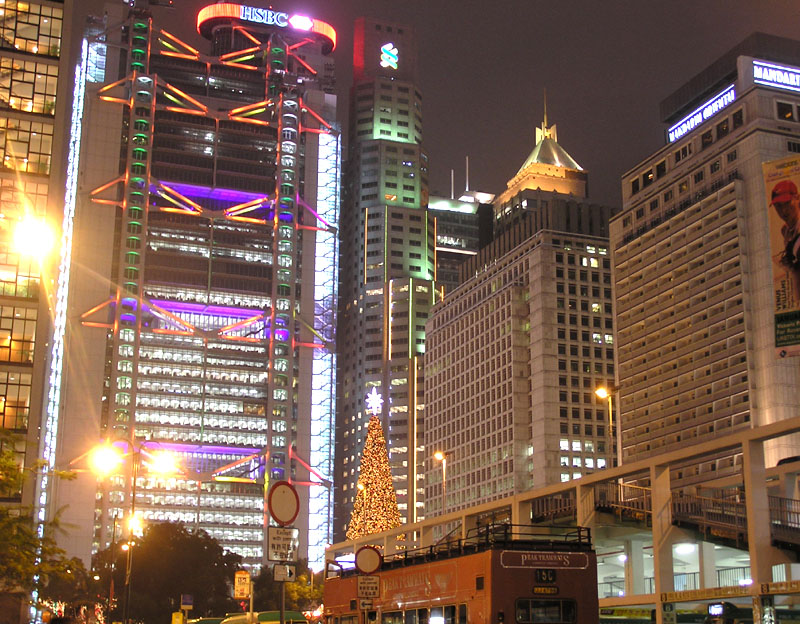
The HSBC Headquarters Building (left) and its neighbourhood at night.

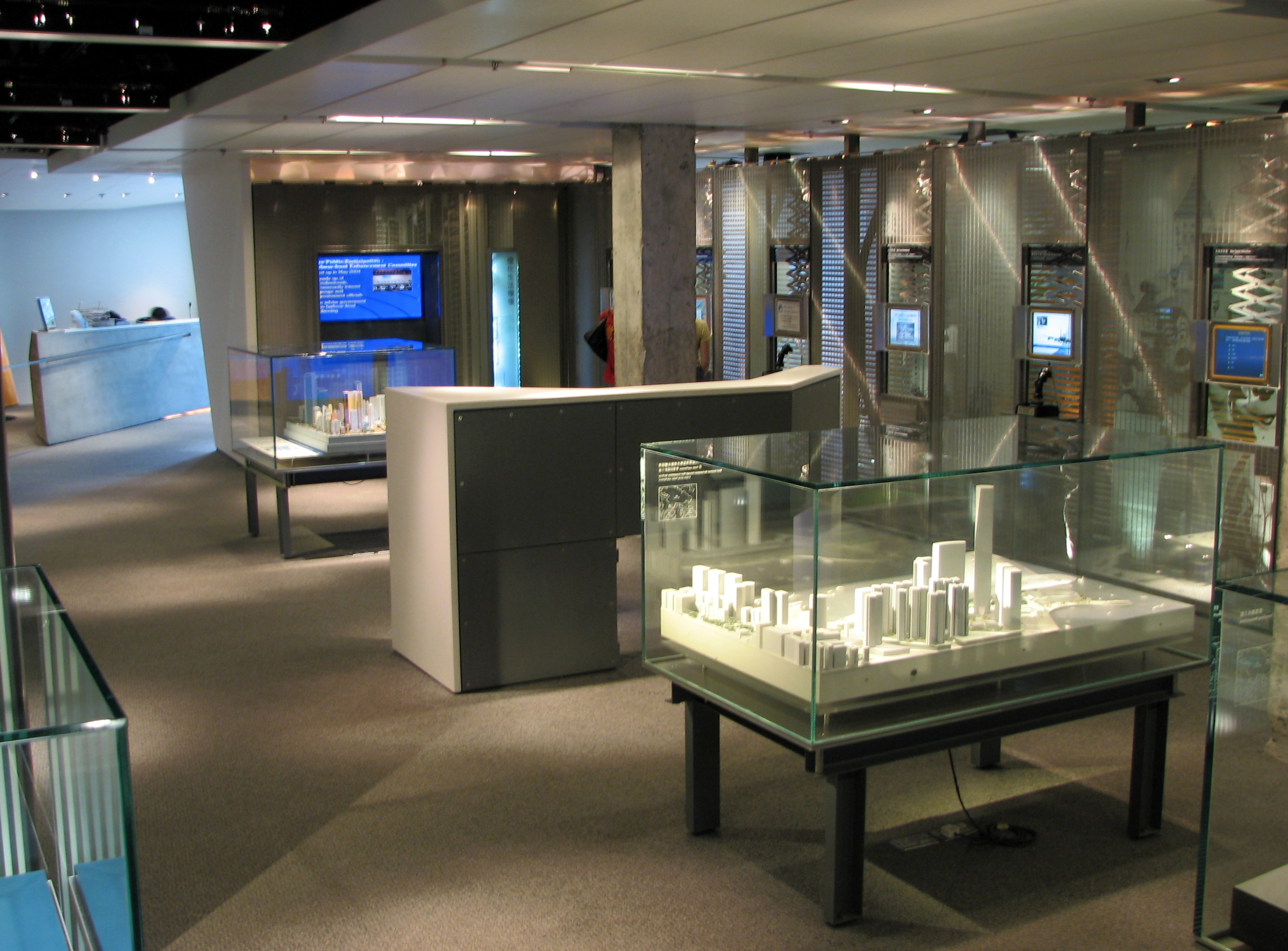
Architectural exhibit at the HK Planning & Infrastructure Exhibition

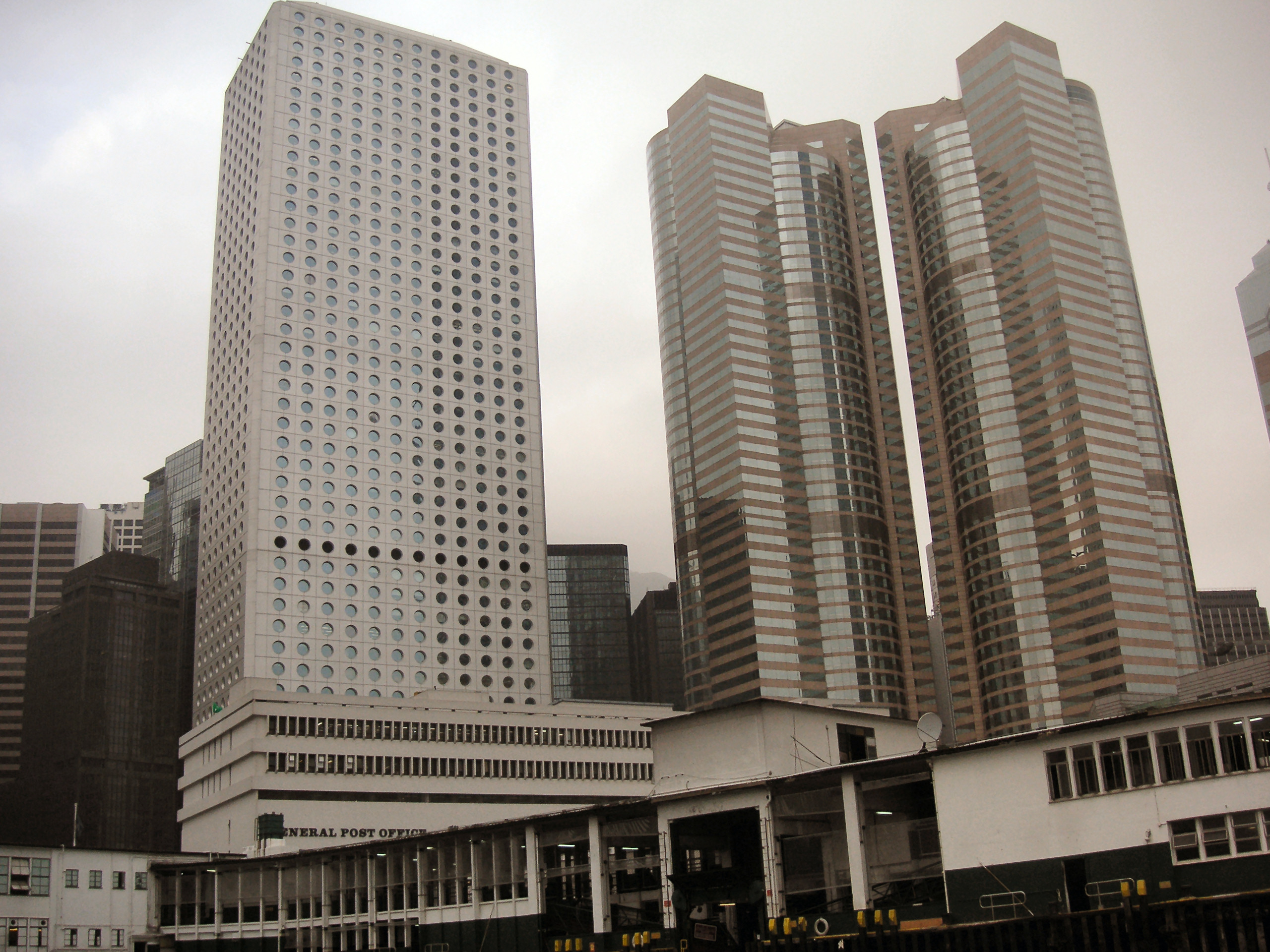
Jardine House and Exchange Square

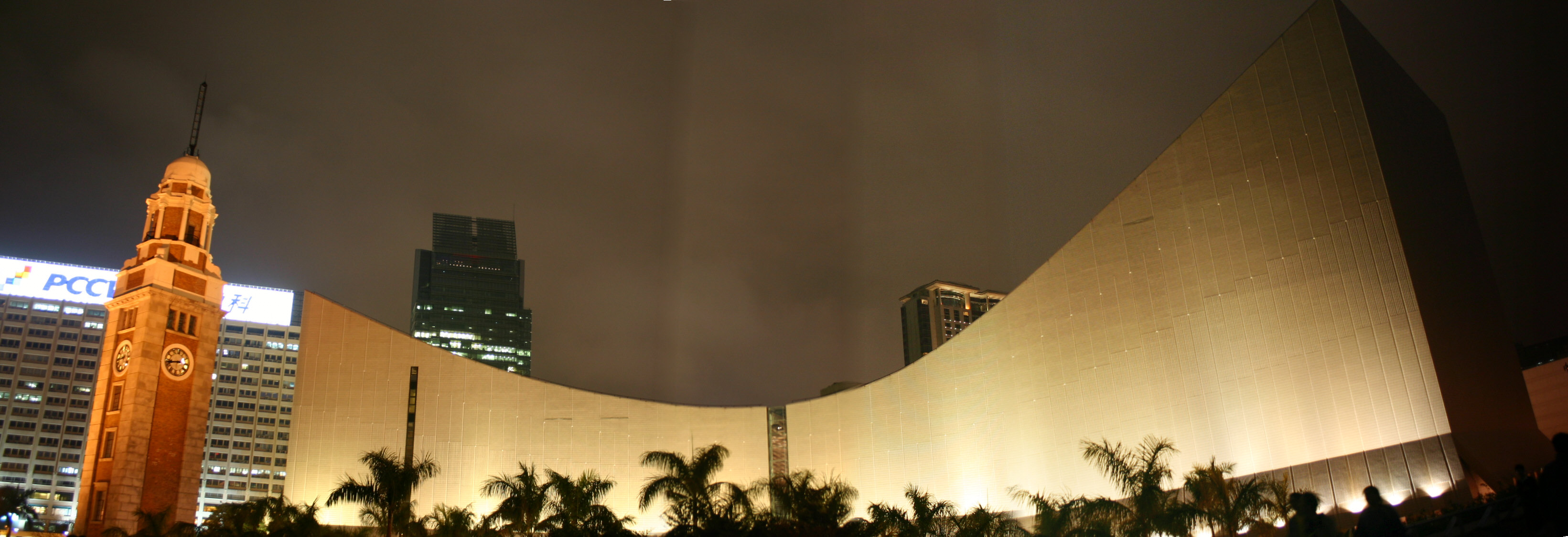
Hong Kong Cultural Centre

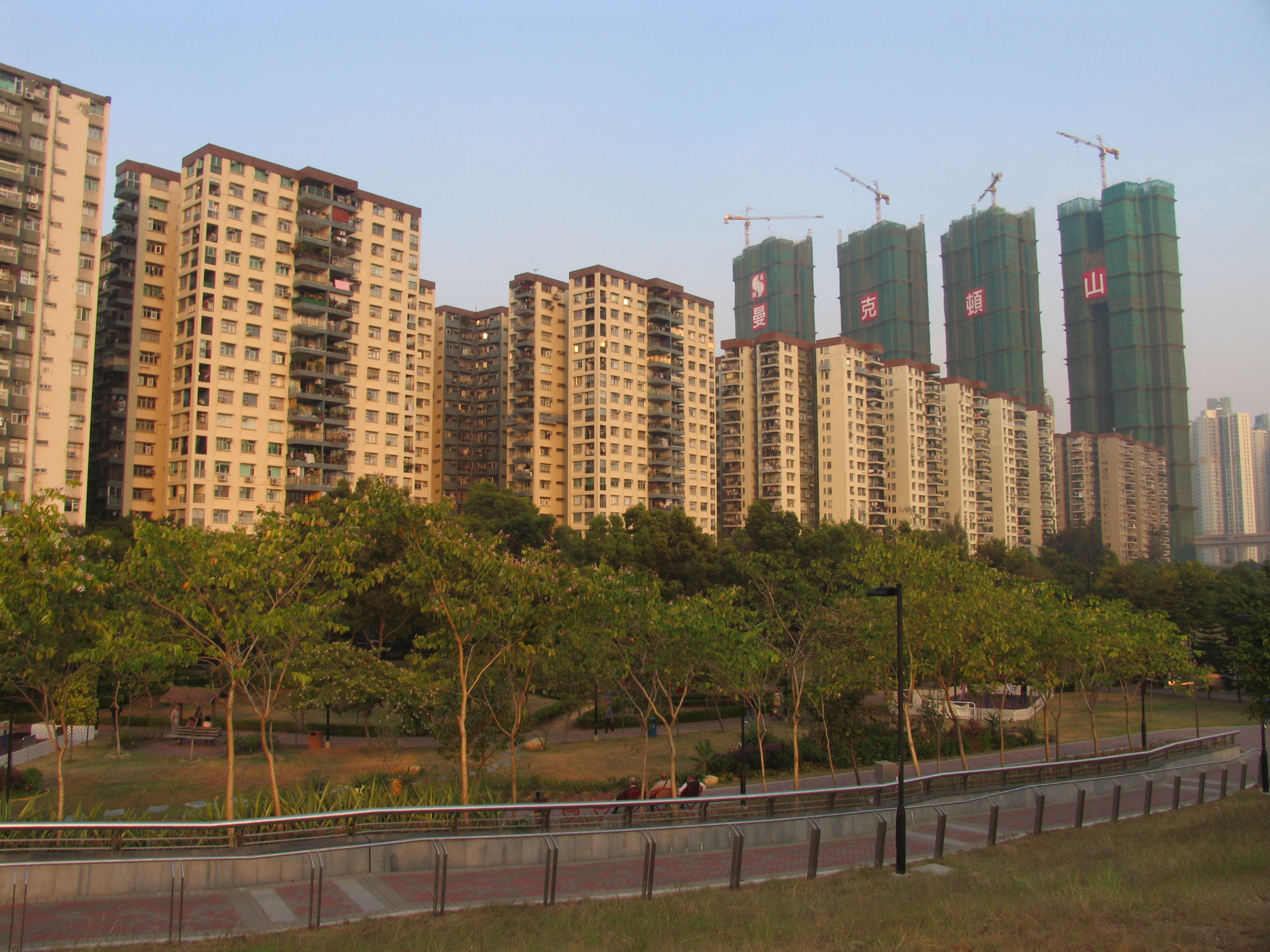
Mei Foo Sun Chuen, one of the first private housing estates

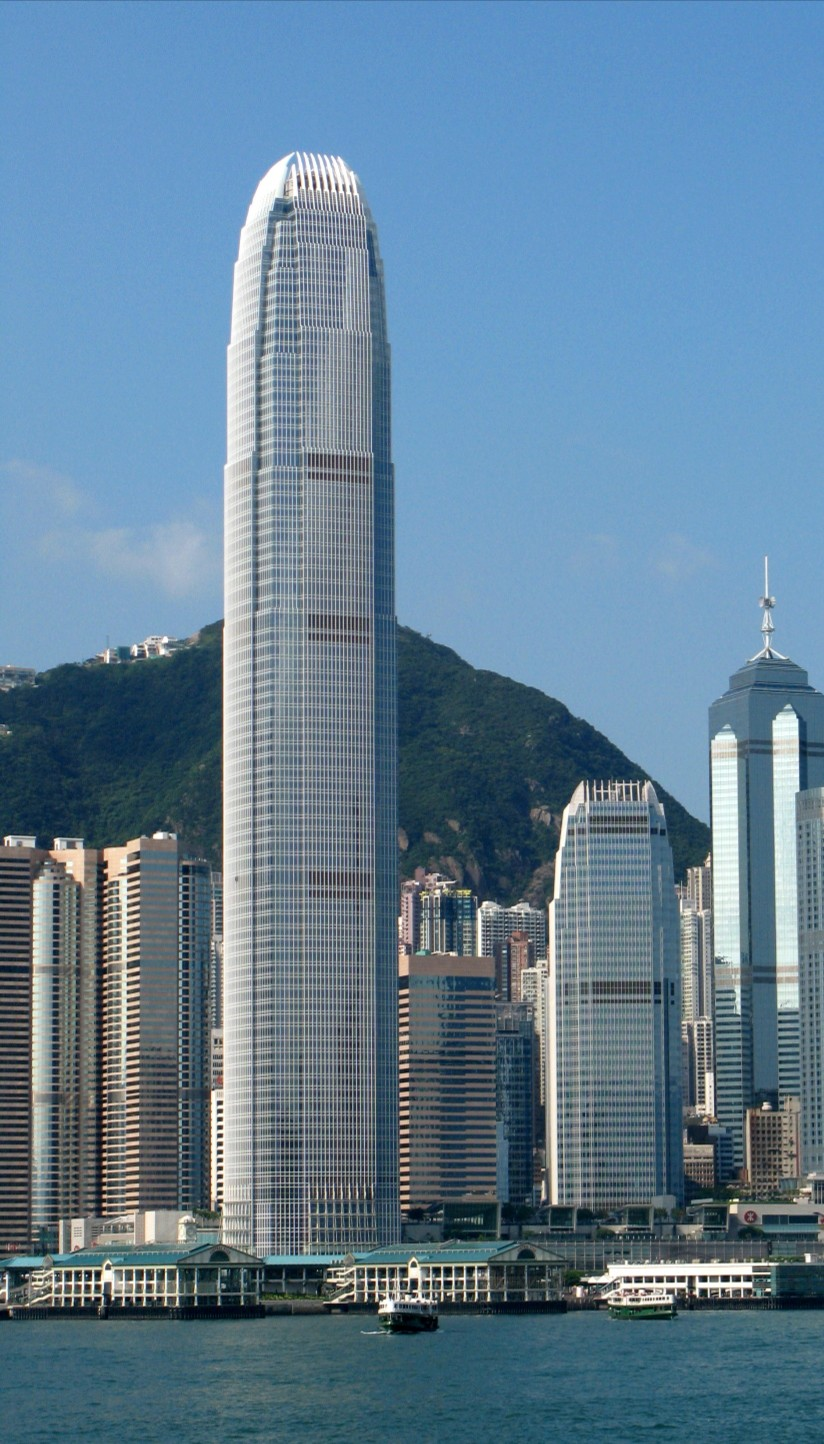
Two International Finance Centre

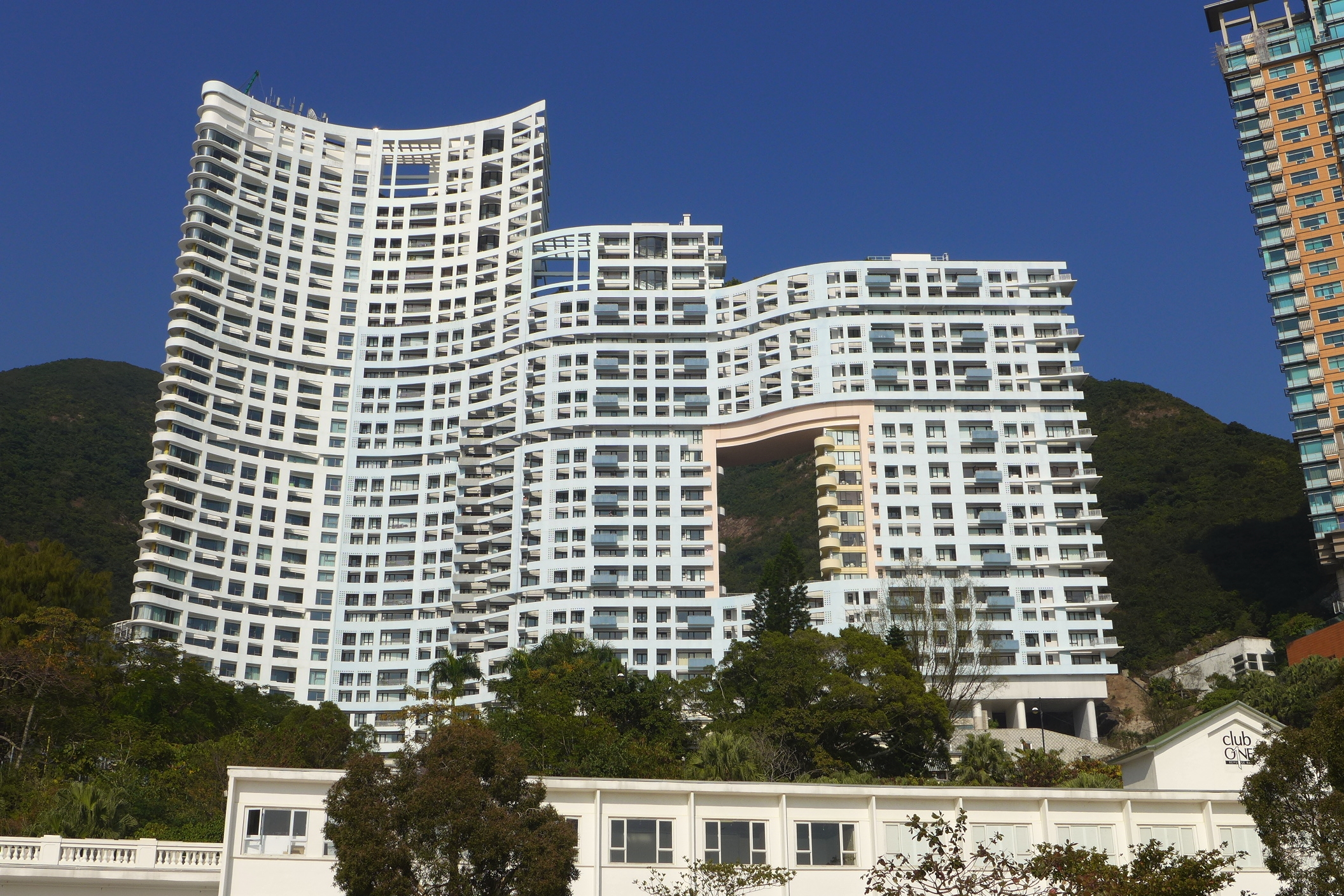
The Repulse Bay, featuring a "dragon gate"

== See also ==
- List of tallest buildings in Hong Kong
- Housing in Hong Kong
- Heritage conservation in Hong Kong
- Hong Kong Institute of Architects
- Kowloon Walled City
- List of buildings and structures in Hong Kong
- List of cities with most skyscrapers
- List of the oldest buildings and structures in Hong Kong
- List of lost buildings and structures in Hong Kong
