= Hong Kong Institute of Architects =

Professional society in Hong Kong

- Logo
- Traditional Chinese: 香港建築師學會
- Simplified Chinese: 香港建筑师学会
Transcriptions
Standard Mandarin
- Hanyu Pinyin: Xiānggǎng Jiànzhùshī Xuéhuì
Yue: Cantonese
- Jyutping: hoeng1 gong2 gin3 zuk1 si1 hok6 wui6*2

Hong Kong Institute of Architects (HKIA, Chinese: 香港建築師學會) is a professional body for architects in Hong Kong. Originally named the Hong Kong Society of Architects (HKSA), it was formed on 3 September 1956 by 27 architects. It is an Allied Society of the Royal Institute of British Architects, and member of the International Union of Architects and the Commonwealth Association of Architects.

== History ==
Originally named the Hong Kong Society of Architects, it was formed on 3 September 1956 by 27 architects. It is recognized by the Royal Institute of British Architects as an Allied Society since 1957 and renamed to Hong Kong Institute of Architects in 1972.

== Designation ==
The professional post-nominals system of HKIA was introduced in 1972, members are entitled to use the post-nominals HKIA after their name, and describe themselves as "architect" or "Member of The Hong Kong Institute of Architects", while associates may describe themselves as "Associate of The Hong Kong Institute of Architects", no post-nominal or abbreviation is permitted.

== Scandal ==
In 2020, HKIA has "skipped" its 64th anniversary on its social media for alleged political sensitivity (assimilation with the June 4th massacre) and went straight to celebrate its 65th anniversary which was due to take place in 2021.

== Past Presidents ==
Year	Name	Ref.
1956-1957	SU Gin Djih (徐敬直)	
1958	WRIGHT Alec Michael John	
1959	ROBINSON Harold Graham Fector	
1960	SZETO Wai (司徒惠)	
1961	GREGORY Wallace Gerard	
1962-1963	DOVEY George Chadwick	
1964	LEE Wei Kwong Edward	
1965	ASTBURY Hugh Cedric	
1966	KWOK Tun Li Stanley (郭敦禮)	
1967	FITCH Alan	
1968	Alfred Victor Jorge Alvares	
1969	CAMPBELL Ian James	
1970	OUYANG Chao Leslie (歐陽昭)	
1971-1972	PRESCOTT Jon Alfred (白自覺)	
1973-1974	WONG Chack Sang Jackson (王澤生)	
1975-1976	LEE King Fun Andrew (李景勳)	
1977-1978	HSU Wo Teh William (徐和德)	
1979-1980	LO Kwong Yiu Lawrence (羅光耀)	
1981-1982	POON Cho Yiu Ronald (潘祖堯)	
1983-1984	HO Sing Tin Edward (何承天)	
1985-1986	WONG Edwin (黃漢威)	
1987-1988	KINOSHITA James Hajime (木下一)	
1989-1990	HAFFNER Christopher (夏扶禮)	
1991-1992	POON Sing Chi Stephen (潘承梓)	
1993-1994	LAU Wing Kwong Dennis (劉榮廣)	
1995-1996	CHUNG Wah Nan (鍾華楠)	
1997-1998	HO Tao (何 弢)	
1999-2000	WILL Barry Fegan (韋栢利)	
2001-2002	LAU Sau Shing Patrick (劉秀成)	
2003	WONG Po Lung John (王寶龍)	
2004	SHEN Edward (沈埃迪)	
2005-2006	LIM Wan Fung Bernard V. (林雲峯)	
2007-2008	LU Yuen Cheung Ronald (呂元祥)	
2009-2010	KWONG Sum Yee Anna (鄺心怡)	
2011-2012	LAM Kwong Ki Dominic (林光祺)	
2013-2014	FUNG Yin Suen Ada (馮宜萱)	
2015-2016	NG Wing Shun Anthony Vincent (吳永順)	
2017-2018	CHEN Marvin (陳沐文)	
2019-2020	LI Kwok Hing Felix (李國興)	
2021-2022	Choi Wun Hing Donald (蔡宏興)	
2023-2024	Chan Chak Bun Benny (陳澤斌)	

== See also ==
- Architecture of Hong Kong
- Hong Kong Institute of Planners
- Hong Kong Institute of Urban Design
