= Tony Tse =

Hong Kong surveyor and politician

The Honourable Tony Tse Wai-chuen BBS
- 謝偉銓
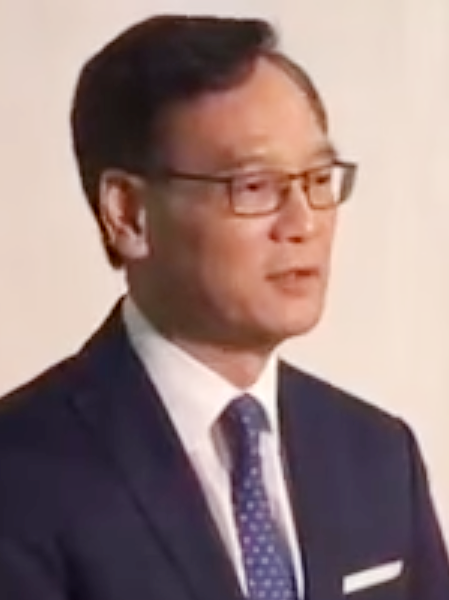

Member of the Legislative Council
- In office 12 March 2018 – 31 December 2025
- Preceded by: Yiu Chung-yim
- Succeeded by: Julia Lau
- Constituency: Architectural, Surveying, Planning and Landscape
- In office 1 October 2012 – 30 September 2016
- Preceded by: Patrick Lau
- Succeeded by: Yiu Chung-yim
- Constituency: Architectural, Surveying and Planning

Personal details
- Born: 27 October 1954 (age 71) Hong Kong
- Education: Hong Kong Polytechnic (HD)
- Occupation: Surveyor

Tony Tse Wai-chuen, BBS (Chinese: 謝偉銓; born 27 October 1954) is a Hong Kong surveyor and politician. He was a member of the Legislative Council for Architectural, Surveying, Planning and Landscape (formerly Architectural, Surveying and Planning) from 2012 to 2016 and again from 2018 to 2025.

== Education and career ==
He was born on 27 October 1954 and graduated from the Hong Kong Polytechnic before joining the Hong Kong Civil Service and working in the Crown Lands & Survey Office. After 12 years, Tse moved into the commercial sector, including with Hongkong Land, Chesterton Petty, Emperor International Holdings, and Henderson Land. He also founded a property development and asset management consultancy, Brand Star.

Tse has held various public positions, including on the Urban Renewal Authority, Town Planning Board, Land and Building Advisory Committee, Municipal Services Appeals Board, Disciplinary Board Panel (Land Survey Ordinance) and Disciplinary Panel of the Hong Kong Institute of Certified Public Accountants. He was also the chairman of the Real Estate Services Training Board of the Vocational Training Council and chairman of the Surveyors Registration Board 2002-03. He was the president of the Hong Kong Institute of Surveyors, 2003-04. From 2012 to 2014 he was the president of the Hong Kong Professional and Senior Executives Association.

== Legislative Council ==
He was first elected to the Legislative Council in Architectural, Surveying and Planning functional constituency in 2012 by defeating incumbent Patrick Lau with a thin margin of 61 votes. Despite running under as an independent politician, Tse was a known to be a supporter of Leung Chun-ying, his fellow surveyor and Hong Kong Polytechnic alumni of whom he nominated in the 2012 Chief Executive election as a member of the Election Committee. He was awarded Bronze Bauhinia Star (BBS) by Chief Executive Leung Chun-ying in 2014.

In the 2016 Legislative Council election, he lost his seat to the pro-democrat candidate Yiu Chung-yim in a three-way contest. After Yiu was disqualified for his conduct during the oath-taking process, Tse ran in the 2018 by-election and successfully retook the seat by defeating independent democrat Paul Zimmerman with nearly 3,000 votes.

He was also appointed member of the Chinese People's Political Consultative Conference (CPPCC) in January 2018. In February 2022, Tse told SCMP that he would not be attending the 2022 Two Sessions, as a Hong Kong delegate, due to family reasons.

Legislative Council of Hong Kong
Preceded by Patrick Lau	Member of Legislative Council; Representative for Architectural, Surveying and Planning; 2012–2016	Succeeded by Yiu Chung-yim
Preceded by Yiu Chung-yim	Member of Legislative Council; Representative for Architectural, Surveying, Planning and Landscape; 2018–2025	Succeeded by Julia Lau
Order of precedence
Preceded by Vincent Cheng Wing-shun; Member of the Legislative Council	Hong Kong order of precedence Member of the Legislative Council	Succeeded by Cupertino Gourgel; Consul-General of Angola
