= Architectural, Surveying, Planning and Landscape (constituency) =

Hong Kong functional constituency

Architectural, Surveying, Planning and Landscape 建築、測量、都市規劃及園境界
- Functional constituency for the Legislative Council of Hong Kong
- Region: Hong Kong
- Electorate: 8,212

Current constituency
- Created: 1991
- Number of members: One
- Member: Julia Lau (Independent)
- Created from: Engineering, Architectural, Surveying and Planning

Architectural, Surveying, Planning and Landscape
- Traditional Chinese: 建築、測量、都市規劃及園境界
- Simplified Chinese: 建筑、测量、都市规划及园境界
Transcriptions
Standard Mandarin
- Hanyu Pinyin: Jiànzhù, Cèliáng, Dūshì Guīhuà jí Yuán Jìngjiè
Yue: Cantonese
- Yale Romanization: Gin jūk, chāk lèuhng, dōu síh kwāi waahk kahp yùhn gíng gaai
- Jyutping: Gin3 zuk1, cak1 loeng4 dou1 si5 kwai1 waak6 kap6 jun4 ging2 gaai3

The Architectural, Surveying, Planning and Landscape functional constituency (Chinese: 建築、測量、都市規劃及園境界功能界別) is a functional constituency in the elections for the Legislative Council of Hong Kong. It was first created in 1985 as Engineering, Architectural, Surveying and Planning for the first ever Legislative Council election in 1985 as one of the original 12 functional constituency seats. The constituency was divided into Engineering and Architectural, Surveying and Planning in 1991. In the 2016 election, the constituency was changed to its current name when the landscape architects were added to the electorates.

The constituency is composed of architects, landscape architects, surveyors, and planners and the members of Hong Kong Institute of Architects, Hong Kong Institute of Landscape Architects, Hong Kong Institute of Surveyors, and Hong Kong Institute of Planners entitled to vote at the general meetings of the associations. As of 2020, there are 9,096 registered voters. It is one of the few swing seats contested between the pro-Beijing and pro-democracy camps. It was first won by independent democrat Yiu Chung-yim in 2016 in a three-way contest against two pro-Beijing candidates, defeating pro-Beijing incumbent Tony Tse, but was soon disqualified for his oath-taking manner from the office. The vacancy was taken up by Tony Tse in the 2018 by-election.

== Composition ==
The architectural, surveying, planning and landscape functional constituency is composed of—

- architects registered under the Architects Registration Ordinance (Cap. 408); and
- members of The Hong Kong Institute of Architects entitled to vote at general meetings of the Institute; and
- landscape architects registered under the Landscape Architects Registration Ordinance (Cap. 516); and
- members of The Hong Kong Institute of Landscape Architects entitled to vote at general meetings of the Institute; and
- professional surveyors registered under the Surveyors Registration Ordinance (Cap. 517); and
- members of The Hong Kong Institute of Surveyors entitled to vote at general meetings of the Institute; and
- professional planners registered under the Planners Registration Ordinance (Cap. 418); and
- members of The Hong Kong Institute of Planners entitled to vote at general meetings of the Institute.

== Return members ==
=== Engineering, Architectural, Surveying and Planning (1985–1991) ===
| Election | Member | Party |
|---|---|---|
| 1985 | Cheng Hon-kwan | Independent |
| 1988 | Cheng Hon-kwan | Independent |

=== Architectural, Surveying and Planning (1991–2016) ===
| Election | Member | Party |
|---|---|---|
| 1991 | Edward Ho | BPF→Liberal |
| 1995 | Edward Ho | Liberal |
Not represented in the PLC (1997–1998)
| 1998 | Edward Ho | Liberal |
| 2000 | Kaizer Lau | Independent |
| 2004 | Patrick Lau | Independent→Alliance |
| 2008 | Patrick Lau | Alliance→Professional Forum |
| 2012 | Tony Tse | Independent |

=== Architectural, Surveying, Planning and Landscape (2016–present) ===
| Election | Member | Party |
|---|---|---|
| 2016 | Edward Yiu | Independent |
| 2018 (b) | Tony Tse | Independent |
| 2021 | Tony Tse | Independent |
| 2025 | Julia Lau | Independent |

== Electoral results ==
=== 2020s ===
2025 Legislative Council election: Architectural, Surveying, Planning and Landscape
| Party | Candidate | Votes | % | ±% |
|---|---|---|---|---|
| Independent | Julia Lau Man-kwan | 2,157 | 51.39 | |
| Independent | Francis Lam Ka-fai | 2,040 | 48.61 | |
| Majority | | 117 | 2.78 | |
| Total valid votes | | 4,197 | 100.00 | |
| Rejected ballots | | 248 | 5.58 | |
| Turnout | | 4,445 | 54.13 | |
| Registered electors | | 8,212 | | |
| Independent gain from Independent | | Swing | | |

2021 Legislative Council election: Architectural, Surveying, Planning and Landscape
| Party | Candidate | Votes | % | ±% |
|---|---|---|---|---|
| Independent | Tony Tse Wai-chuen | 2,266 | 68.07 | +12.53 |
| Independent | Chan Chak-bun | 1,063 | 31.93 | |
| Majority | | 1,203 | 36.14 | |
| Total valid votes | | 3,329 | 100.00 | |
| Rejected ballots | | 163 | | |
| Turnout | | 3,492 | 38.28 | |
| Registered electors | | 9,123 | | |
| Independent hold | | Swing | | |

=== 2010s ===
2018 Architectural, Surveying, Planning and Landscape by-election
| Party | Candidate | Votes | % | ±% |
|---|---|---|---|---|
| Independent | Tony Tse Wai-chuen | 2,929 | 55.54 | +20.51 |
| Independent | Paulus Johannes Zimmerman | 2,345 | 44.46 | +1.02 |
| Majority | | 584 | 11.08 | |
| Total valid votes | | 5,274 | 100.00 | |
| Rejected ballots | | 118 | | |
| Turnout | | 5,392 | 70.77 | |
| Registered electors | | 7,619 | | |
| Independent gain from Independent | | Swing | | |

2016 Legislative Council election: Architectural, Surveying, Planning and Landscape
| Party | Candidate | Votes | % | ±% |
|---|---|---|---|---|
| Independent | Yiu Chung-yim | 2,491 | 43.44 | |
| Independent | Tony Tse Wai-chuen | 2,009 | 35.03 | −0.17 |
| Independent | Bernard Vincent Lim Wan-fung | 1,235 | 21.35 | |
| Majority | | 482 | 8.41 | |
| Total valid votes | | 5,735 | 100.00 | |
| Rejected ballots | | 93 | | |
| Turnout | | 5,828 | 79.07 | |
| Registered electors | | 7,371 | | |
| Independent hold | | Swing | | |

2012 Legislative Council election: Architectural, Surveying and Planning
| Party | Candidate | Votes | % | ±% |
|---|---|---|---|---|
| Independent | Tony Tse Wai-chuen | 1,668 | 35.20 | |
| Independent | Patrick Lau Sau-shing | 1,607 | 33.91 | −3.36 |
| Democratic | Stanley Ng Wing-fai | 1,464 | 30.89 | +12.32 |
| Majority | | 61 | 1.29 | |
| Total valid votes | | 4,739 | 100.00 | |
| Rejected ballots | | 211 | | |
| Turnout | | 4,950 | 73.00 | |
| Registered electors | | 6,781 | | |
| Independent hold | | Swing | | |

=== 2000s ===
2008 Legislative Council election: Architectural, Surveying and Planning
| Party | Candidate | Votes | % | ±% |
|---|---|---|---|---|
| Independent | Patrick Lau Sau-shing | 1,429 | 37.27 | +8.91 |
| Independent | Yu Kam-hung | 1,241 | 32.37 | |
| Democratic | Stanley Ng Wing-fai | 712 | 18.57 | +5.34 |
| Independent | Chan Yiu-fai | 383 | 9.99 | −2.94 |
| Independent | Chan Chan-fai | 69 | 1.80 | |
| Majority | | 188 | 4.90 | |
| Total valid votes | | 3,834 | 100.00 | |
| Rejected ballots | | 125 | | |
| Turnout | | 3,959 | 64.41 | |
| Registered electors | | 6,147 | | |
| Independent hold | | Swing | | |

2004 Legislative Council election: Architectural, Surveying and Planning
| Party | Candidate | Votes | % | ±% |
|---|---|---|---|---|
| Independent | Patrick Lau Sau-shing | 1,130 | 28.36 | |
| Independent | Kenneth Chan Jor-kin | 649 | 16.29 | |
| Independent | Kaizer Lau Ping-cheung | 616 | 15.46 | −24.42 |
| Independent | Roger Anthony Nissim | 547 | 13.73 | |
| Democratic | Stanley Ng Wing-fai | 527 | 13.23 | |
| Independent | Chan Yiu-fai | 515 | 12.93 | |
| Majority | | 481 | 12.04 | |
| Total valid votes | | 3,984 | 100.00 | |
| Rejected ballots | | 75 | | |
| Turnout | | 4,059 | 79.34 | |
| Registered electors | | 5,116 | | |
| Independent gain from Independent | | Swing | | |

2000 Legislative Council election: Architectural, Surveying and Planning
| Party | Candidate | Votes | % | ±% |
|---|---|---|---|---|
| Independent | Kaizer Lau Ping-cheung | 938 | 39.88 | |
| Independent | Law Kin-chung | 767 | 32.61 | |
| Liberal | Edward Ho Sing-tin | 647 | 27.51 | |
| Majority | | 171 | 7.27 | |
| Total valid votes | | 2,352 | 100.00 | |
| Rejected ballots | | 60 | | |
| Turnout | | 2,412 | 63.29 | |
| Registered electors | | 3,811 | | |
| Independent gain from Liberal | | Swing | | |

=== 1990s ===
1998 Legislative Council election: Architectural, Surveying and Planning
| Party | Candidate | Votes | % | ±% |
|---|---|---|---|---|
| Liberal | Edward Ho Sing-tin | Unopposed | | |
| Registered electors | | 3,218 | | |
| Liberal win (new seat) | | | | |

1995 Legislative Council election: Architectural, Surveying and Planning
| Party | Candidate | Votes | % | ±% |
|---|---|---|---|---|
| Liberal | Edward Ho Sing-tin | Unopposed | | |
| Registered electors | | 1,878 | | |
| Liberal hold | | Swing | | |

1991 Legislative Council election: Architectural, Surveying and Planning
| Party | Candidate | Votes | % | ±% |
|---|---|---|---|---|
| BPF | Edward Ho Sing-tin | 552 | 53.70 | |
| LDF | Lau Siu-kwan | 246 | 23.93 | |
| NHKA | Kan Fook-yee | 136 | 13.23 | |
| Independent | Po Luk-kei | 94 | 9.14 | |
| Majority | | 306 | 29.77 | |
| Total valid votes | | 1,028 | 100.00 | |
| Rejected ballots | | 11 | | |
| Turnout | | 1,039 | 70.16 | |
| Registered electors | | 1,481 | | |
| BPF hold | | Swing | | |

=== 1980s ===
1988 Legislative Council election: Engineering, Architectural, Surveying and Planning
| Party | Candidate | Votes | % | ±% |
|---|---|---|---|---|
| Independent | Cheng Hon-kwan | Unopposed | | |
| Independent hold | | Swing | | |

1985 Legislative Council election: Engineering, Architectural, Surveying and Planning
| Party | Candidate | Votes | % | ±% |
|---|---|---|---|---|
| Independent | Cheng Hon-kwan | 1,129 | 41.83 | |
| Independent | Raymond Ho Chung-tai | 1,074 | 39.79 | |
| Independent | To Leung-tak | 496 | 18.38 | |
| Majority | | 55 | 2.04 | |
| Total valid votes | | 2,699 | 100.00 | |
| Independent win (new seat) | | | | |
