= Cheng Hon-kwan =

Hong Kong engineer and politician

Cheng Hong-kwan GBS, OBE, JP
- 鄭漢鈞

Member of the Executive Council
- In office 1 November 1988 – 31 October 1991
- Appointed by: Sir David Wilson
- Preceded by: Chiu Hin-kwong
- Succeeded by: Edward Ho

Member of the Legislative Council
- In office 30 October 1985 – 22 August 1991
- Constituency: Engineering, Architectural, Surveying and Planning

Chairman of the Housing Authority
- In office 1 October 2000 – 1 April 2003
- Appointed by: Tung Chee-hwa
- Preceded by: Rosanna Wong
- Succeeded by: Michael Suen

Personal details
- Born: 16 May 1927 (age 99) Hong Kong
- Spouse: Helen Cheng Lam Shui-ying
- Children: 4
- Education: Tianjin University (BSc), Imperial College (DIC)
- Occupation: Structural engineer

Cheng Hon-kwan (Chinese: 鄭漢鈞; born 16 May 1927) is a Hong Kong engineer and politician. He was the member of the Executive Council and Legislative Council of Hong Kong in the 1980s and was chairman of the Hong Kong Housing Authority from 2000 to 2002.

== Education and government career ==
Cheng was born in Hong Kong on 16 May 1927 and was educated in Beijing and Tianjin. He received Bachelor of Science in civil engineering from Tianjin University in 1948 and moved to Hong Kong. He joined the Hong Kong government as an assistant structural engineer to the architectural office of the Public Works Department in 1953.

He subsequently studied abroad in England and graduated with the Diploma of Imperial College in Concrete Structures and Technology from the Imperial College London in 1964. He returned to Hong Kong and became the chief structural engineer of the Buildings Ordinance Office of the Public Works Department by 1965. He retired from the government in 1977 and started his own consultancy office, H. K. Cheng & Partners, Consulting Engineers.

== Public career ==
He is the fellow of the Hong Kong Institution of Engineers, Institution of Structural Engineers in the United Kingdom, American Society of Civil Engineers, and member of the Association of Consulting Engineers in the United Kingdom and Hong Kong. In 1978–79, he was elected president of the Hong Kong Institution of Engineers. In 2002. the Institution of Structural Engineers, United Kingdom awarded a Gold Medal to Dr. Cheng for his personal contribution in establishing structural engineering as a pre-eminent profession in Hong Kong.

He had been appointed to many public positions, including member of Land and Building Advisory Committee, Appeal Tribunal (Buildings Ordinance), Committee of Review Panel (Buildings Ordinance), Engineering Advisory Committee of the University of Hong Kong, board of directors of the Chinese YMCA and board of governors of the Hong Kong Bible Society.

He became one of the first elected members of the Legislative Council of Hong Kong when the indirect elections were introduced in 1985, in which he was elected to the council in 1985 and 1988 through the Engineering, Architectural, Surveying and Planning functional constituency elected by engineers architects, surveyors and urban planners. In 1988, he was appointed to the Executive Council of Hong Kong by Governor Sir David Wilson until his retirement in 1991.

== Recent career ==
He remained active in the public arena after 1997. In 1998, he was among the first recipients of the Gold Bauhinia Star. He was appointed chairman of the Hong Kong Housing Authority from 2000 to 2003. He was also chairman of the Council of the City University of Hong Kong and the Open University of Hong Kong, as well as vice-chairman of the Council of the Hong Kong University of Science and Technology. He also serves on the Standing Committee of the Tianjin Committee of the Chinese People's Political Consultative Committee.

Legislative Council of Hong Kong
New constituency	Member of the Legislative Council; Representative for Engineering, Architectural, Surveying and Planning; 1985–1991	Succeeded by Constituency abolished
Political offices
Preceded by Chiu Hin-kwong	Unofficial Member of the Executive Council of Hong Kong; 1988–1991	Succeeded by Edward Ho
Preceded by Rosanna Wong	Chairman of the Housing Authority; 2000–2003	Succeeded by Michael Suen
