= Pal Pang =

Interior architect

Pal Pang is an interior architect and artist based in London, United Kingdom. He is the founder of Another Design International. His company has completed projects in Hong Kong and the United Kingdom.

Pang is also a fellow of the Royal Society for Arts, Manufactures and Commerce.

He is also a musician and has recently released music albums.

== Early life and career ==
Pang received a bachelor’s degree in interior design from the Surrey Institute of Art & Design, University College, now University for the Creative Arts.

After graduation, he returned to Hong Kong and started interior designing of retail stores and shopping malls. In 2001, he founded an interior design company, Pal Pang Interior Architecture, which is now known as Another Design International.

In 2003, Pang worked on his first project with Madia, a jewelry group based in Hong Kong, in which he used LED lights, stainless steel, and glass to increase visibility of diamonds at the store. After completion of the first project, Pang has worked on several other retail stores with Madia.

In 2012, he received the Italian A' Design Award and Competition for his work The Peak in which he transformed a Hong Kong-style apartment into a small presidential suite. The work used wood and different fabrics to give technical details and light effects and which later became the standard model of elite home furnishing.

In 2014, he moved to the United Kingdom where he founded his studio, Another England.

In 2019, his refurbishment work which turned around a luxury penthouse in Battersea Power Station, London was selected for London Architecture Awards of the Year for Architectural Design. Pang in his design, used Italian custom-made furniture, original artwork and principles of feng shui.

Pang has also designed Jaguar showrooms in which he used dark space and matte finish to bring light out of the cars.

== Bibliography ==
- Pang, Pal (2010). Design of Faith and Devotion
- Pang, Pal; Cobanli, Onur Mustak; Valsecchi, Simone (2013). Big ideas for small spaces-Grandi progetti per piccolo spazi

== Discography ==
- Driving in the Tunnel
- Lift to Basement

== Awards ==
- Interior Design Award by CNBC Asia Pacific Property Awards (2008)
- Environmental Property Award by The Hong Kong Institute of Surveyors (2008)
- Interior Design Award at Bloomberg Asia Pacific Property Awards (2010)
