= Professional Forum =

Professional Forum 專業會議
- Founded: 1991 (as Breakfast Group)
- Dissolved: 7 October 2012
- Merged into: Business and Professionals Alliance for Hong Kong
- Ideology: Conservatism (HK); Economic liberalism
- Political position: Centre-right
- Regional affiliation: Pro-Beijing camp

Professional Forum (Chinese: 專業會議), formerly known as the Breakfast Group (Chinese: 早餐派) and The Alliance (Chinese: 泛聯盟), was a loose political group of the independent politicians in the Legislative Council in Hong Kong. In October 2012, the group formed the Business and Professionals Alliance for Hong Kong (BPA) with other LegCo members from the pro-business sectors.

== History ==
=== Breakfast Group ===
The Breakfast Group was set up in 1991 in the Legislative Council of Hong Kong by Simon Ip Sik-on and Eric Li Ka-cheung and consisted of four other legislators elected through the functional constituencies or appointed by the Governor of Hong Kong. Each representing their professional sectors' interests, they had no clear political affiliations and were considered as relatively moderate and independent and acted as a third force between pro-democracy and pro-Beijing camps, although it was largely pro-government.

In 1994, the Breakfast Group members Simon Ip and Martin Gilbert Barrow, who said they would vote for the Liberal Party's amendment on Chris Patten's constitutional reform proposals, however abstained at last which resulted in the defeat of the Liberals' amendment, while Timothy Ha Wing-ho voted against the amendment and voted for Patten's proposals.

During the 2000–2004 sessions the Breakfast Group had seven Legislative Councillors, led by Eric Li from the Accountancy until his LegCo retirement in 2004 and included Bernard Chan (Insurance constituency), Raymond Ho Chung-tai (Engineering), Kaizer Lau Ping-cheung (Architectural, Surveying and Planning constituency), Abraham Shek Lai-him (Real Estate and Construction constituency), Lo Wing-lok (Medical constituency) and Ng Leung-sing (Election Committee constituency).

=== The Alliance ===
The Breakfast Group renamed into the Alliance in October 2004 after the 2004 LegCo elections by remaining group members Bernard Chan, Raymond Ho and Abraham Shek. New members Patrick Lau Sau-shing (Architectural, Surveying and Planning constituency) and Lui Ming-wah (Industrial (Second) constituency) joined into their groups. Bernard Chan was appointed member of the Executive Council on 12 October 2004.

=== Professional Forum ===
The Group renamed itself Professional Forum following the 2008 elections. The Forum consists of four members, Abraham Shek, Patrick Lau, Raymond Ho and Priscilla Leung Mei-Fun who was elected through the Kowloon West geographical constituency. In October 2012, the group formed the Business and Professionals Alliance for Hong Kong with other LegCo members from the pro-business sectors.

== See also ==
- A4 Alliance, a similar loose political group formed in 2022
