= Edward Yiu =

Hong Kong academic

Yiu Chung-yim MHKIS, FRICS
- 姚松炎
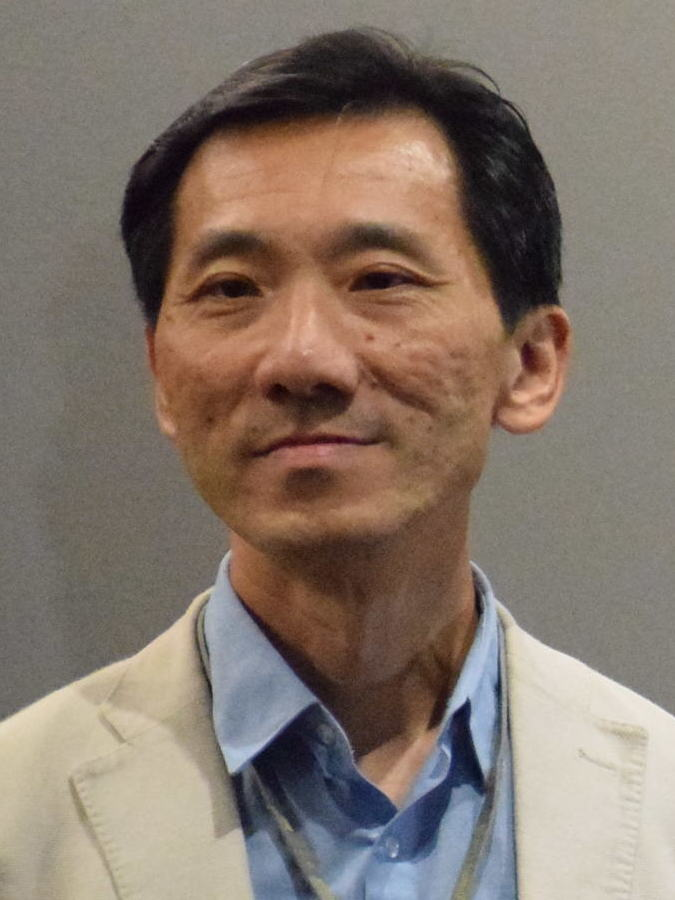
- Yiu in 2017

Member of the Legislative Council
- In office 1 October 2016 – 14 July 2017 (Note: Yiu served as member of the Legislative Council until 14 July 2017 when his oath on 12 October 2016 was invalidated and his seat was vacated according to the ruling of the Court of First Instance.)
- Preceded by: Tony Tse
- Succeeded by: Tony Tse
- Constituency: Architectural, Surveying, Planning and Landscape

Personal details
- Born: 19 July 1964 (age 61) Hong Kong
- Education: Kowloon Technical School
- Alma mater: University of Hong Kong (BS, MPhil, PhD)
- Occupation: Associate professor
- Profession: Professional surveyor, Chartered Surveyor

Edward Yiu Chung-yim
- Chinese: 姚松炎
Transcriptions
Standard Mandarin
- Hanyu Pinyin: Yáo Sōngyán
Yue: Cantonese
- Jyutping: jiu4 cung4 jim4

Edward Yiu Chung-yim (Chinese: 姚松炎; born 19 July 1964) is a Hong Kong academic, scholar and former politician who is currently an associate professor of property at the University of Auckland Business School. He is a former member of the Legislative Council of Hong Kong elected in the 2016 Legislative Council election representing the functional constituency of Architectural, Surveying, Planning and Landscape. On 14 July 2017, Yiu was disqualified by the court over his manner on oath of office at the inaugural meeting of the Legislative Council on 12 October 2016 as a result of the oath-taking controversy.

== Biography ==
Yiu graduated from the University of Hong Kong (HKU) with a degree in surveying in 1998 and later earned master's and doctoral degrees from the HKU in 2000 and 2002 respectively. He is a member of the Hong Kong Institute of Surveyors, the Royal Institution of Chartered Surveyors and various professional organisations.

He also started teaching as an instructor and lecturer at the City University of Hong Kong in 2002, became an assistant professor at the Hong Kong Polytechnic University, the City University and the University of Hong Kong and an associate professor at the Chinese University of Hong Kong.

In 2016, Yiu was elected to the Legislative Council of Hong Kong in the Legislative Council election through the Architectural, Surveying, Planning and Landscape functional constituency, defeating incumbent Tony Tse Wai-chuen with 43 percent of the 5,735 votes cast, against Tse's 35 percent. It was the only defeat for an incumbent across the 30 functional constituencies.

At the inaugural meeting of the Legislative Council on 12 October 2016, Yiu made the oath taking ceremony as a platform to protest like other pro-democracy and localist legislators. He added the words "safeguarding the institutional justice, fighting for universal suffrage, serving for the sustainable development of Hong Kong" in his oath twice and his oaths were invalidated by the clerk. Yiu retook the oath at the next meeting on 19 October.

However, the oath-taking controversy sparked by two localist legislators Sixtus Leung and Yau Wai-ching of Youngspiration led to the unprecedented legal challenge from Chief Executive Leung Chun-ying and Secretary for Justice Rimsky Yuen against Yiu. On 7 November 2016, the National People's Congress Standing Committee (NPCSC) interpreted of the Article 104 of the Basic Law of Hong Kong, standardising the manners of the oath-taking when taking public office. As a result, the duo were disqualified by the court. Subsequently, the government launched a second legal action against Yiu and three other pro-democracy legislators, Lau Siu-lai, Nathan Law and Leung Kwok-hung, which resulted in their disqualifications from the Legislative Council on 14 July 2017.

He ran again in the March 2018 Kowloon West by-election for the seat left vacant by Yau Wai-ching after defeating Frederick Fung and Ramon Yuen in a three-way primary coordinated by the Power for Democracy. Despite rumours that his candidacy could be foiled on the basis of National People's Congress Standing Committee interpretation of the Basic Law being applied to the entire term of the current legislature, Yiu survived the disqualification. However, he lost to Vincent Cheng from Democratic Alliance for the Betterment and Progress of Hong Kong (DAB) with a narrow margin of 2,419 votes, becoming the first pro-democrat to lose in a geographical constituency by-election since 1992.

== Notes ==
Legislative Council of Hong Kong
| Preceded by Tony Tse | Member of Legislative Council; Representative for Architectural, Surveying, Planning and Landscape; 2016–2017 | Succeeded by Tony Tse |
