= March 2018 Hong Kong by-elections =

2018 Hong Kong by-elections
- 11 March 2018

3 Geographical Constituencies & 1 Functional Constituency in the Legislative Council
- Turnout: 43.13%
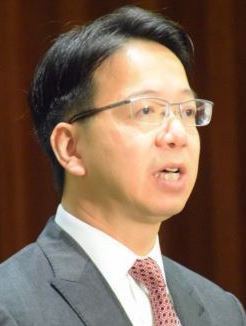

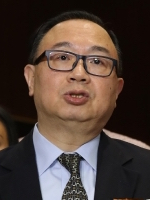
Leader	Charles Mok	Martin Liao
Alliance	Pro-democracy camp	Pro-Beijing camp
Seats won	2	2
Popular vote	426,003	388,017
Percentage	47.43%	43.20%
- Camps with most votes by each district
Legislative Councillors before election
Nathan Law (D)
Yau Wai-ching (Y)
Sixtus Leung (Y)
Yiu Chung-yim (Ind)
Elected Legislative Councillors
Au Nok-hin (Ind)
Vincent Cheng (DAB)
Gary Fan (ND)
Tony Tse (Ind)

The 2018 Hong Kong Legislative Council by-election was held on 11 March 2018 for four of the six vacancies in the Legislative Council of Hong Kong (LegCo) - the Hong Kong Island, Kowloon West and New Territories East geographical constituencies and the Architectural, Surveying, Planning and Landscape functional constituency - resulting from the disqualification of six pro-democrat and localist camp Legislative Council members over the 2016 oath-taking controversy. The by-election for the two other seats was not held due to pending legal appeals by the two disqualified legislators.

The pro-democrats and pro-Beijing camp each won two seats in the election. Independent democrat Au Nok-hin replaced Demosistō's Agnes Chow - whose candidacy was rejected before the election - won in Hong Kong Island, and the Neo Democrats' Gary Fan retook his seat in New Territories East, while pro-Beijing nonpartisan Tony Tse, who was defeated in his 2016 re-election bid, regained the Architectural, Surveying, Planning and Landscape seat, and Vincent Cheng of the Democratic Alliance for the Betterment and Progress of Hong Kong (DAB) caused an upset in Kowloon West by narrowly defeating independent democrat Yiu Chung-yim who lost his seat in the oath-taking controversy, making it the first time the pro-Beijing camp received a greater vote share than the pro-democrats in a geographical constituency since 2000 and the first time a pro-Beijing candidate won in a geographical constituency by-election since 1992.

The vote share of the pro-democracy camp dropped significantly from the traditional level of around 55 per cent to only 47 per cent, with a low turnout of 43 per cent. As a result, the pro-Beijing camp maintained its dominance in the geographical constituencies following the oath-taking disqualification with a one-seat majority.

== Background ==
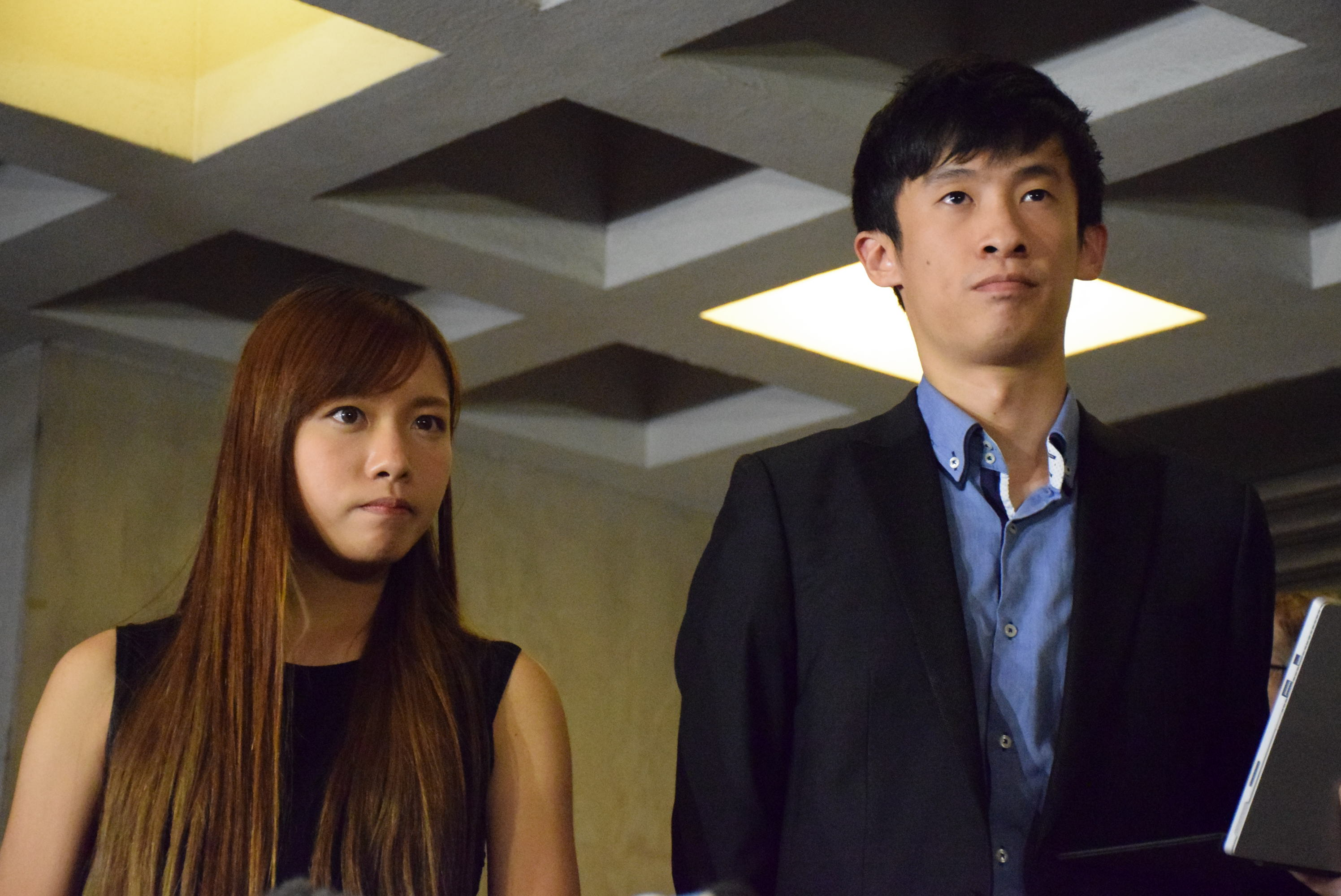
Two Youngspiration legislators Yau Wai-ching and Sixtus Leung were ousted from the Legislative Council by the court on 15 November 2016.

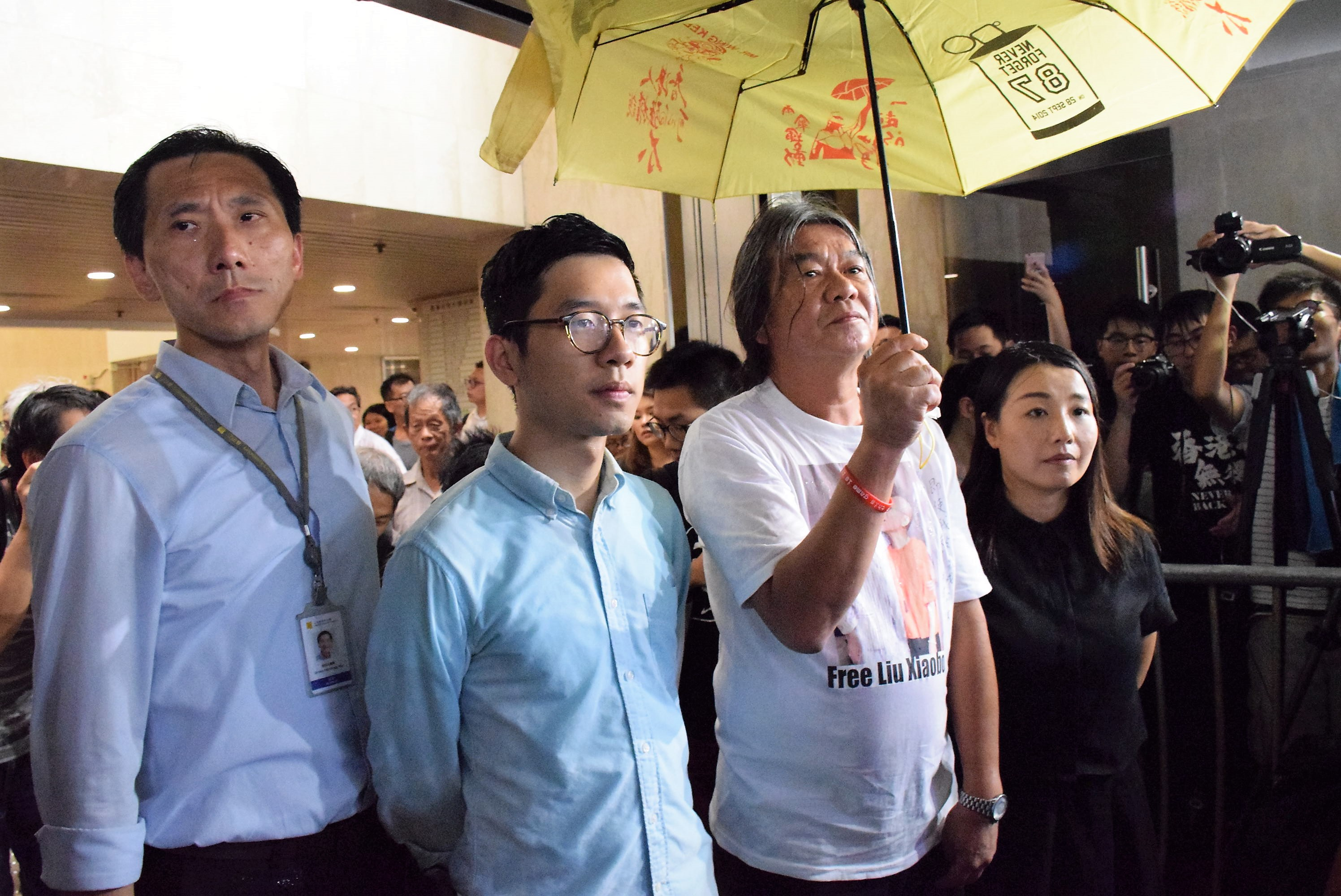
Four pro-democracy legislators, Yiu Chung-yim, Nathan Law, Leung Kwok-hung and Lau Siu-lai were disqualified on 14 July 2017.

The 2016 Legislative Council election saw the emergence of the newly founded localist camp legislators elected to the Legislative Council, including Sixtus Leung and Yau Wai-ching of the pro-independence Youngspiration, as well as Nathan Law of the Demosistō and nonpartisans Lau Siu-lai and Eddie Chu who ran under the banner of the "democratic self-determination".

On 12 October 2016 the inaugural meeting of LegCo, Sixtus Leung and Yau Wai-ching used the oath-taking ceremony as a platform to protest, by claiming that "as a member of the Legislative Council, I shall pay earnest efforts in keeping guard over the interests of the Hong Kong nation," displaying a "Hong Kong is not China" banner, and mispronouncing "People’s Republic of China" as "people’s re-fucking of Chee-na". Their oath were invalidated by the clerk and the controversy caused a huge backlash among the Hong Kong public. Chief Executive Leung Chun-ying and Secretary for Justice Rimsky Yuen took the unprecedented step of launching a judicial review seeking the disqualification of the duo.

On 7 November, the National People's Congress Standing Committee (NPCSC) controversially interpreted Article 104 of the Basic Law of Hong Kong to "clarify" the requirements that the legislators need to swear allegiance to Hong Kong as part of China when they take office, stating that "who intentionally reads out words which do not accord with the wording of the oath prescribed by law, or takes the oath in a manner which is not sincere or not solemn" should be barred from taking their public office and cannot retake the oath. As a consequence, the High Court disqualified Sixtus Leung and Yau Wai-ching on 15 November. On 25 August 2017, the Court of Final Appeal rejected a final bid by Sixtus Leung and Yau Wai-ching.

On 2 December, Leung Chun-ying and Rimsky Yuen lodged another judicial review against Nathan Law, Lau Siu-lai, Leung Kwok-hung and Yiu Chung-yim who also added words into or changed their tones when reading the oaths during the ceremony. As a result, the High Court ruled the four pro-democracy legislators were to lose their seats on 14 July 2017.

The government announced the date of the by-election for four of the six constituencies would be on 11 March 2018. Nevertheless, the by-elections of the other seat in Kowloon West and New Territories East after the disqualification of Lau Siu-lai and Leung Kwok-hung would not be held as the duo are seeking for appeal. Lau and Leung were seeking for appeals strategically to avoid the by-election of both two seats in Kowloon West and New Territories East to be held together, which would give pro-Beijing camp the advantage to take at least one seat away from the pro-democrats in each constituency.

== Pro-democracy primary ==
In order to maximise the chance of pro-democracy camp, the Power for Democracy initiated a co-ordination of the pro-democracy candidates in elections. It held a primary in Kowloon West and New Territories East, where more than one pro-democrats were interested in running from December 2017 to January 2018. The primary was conducted in three parts: telephone polls, a generic ballot vote on 14 January 2018 and voting by parties and civil groups that participated in the primary. The first two parts counted for 45 per cent each, and the last part counted for 10 per cent in the final result.

In Kowloon West, the candidates were Frederick Fung of the Hong Kong Association for Democracy and People's Livelihood (ADPL), Ramon Yuen of the Democratic Party, Occupy activist Ken Tsang and disqualified legislator Yiu Chung-yim, which Tsang subsequently withdrew from the primary to support Yiu; in New Territories East, the candidates were Gary Fan of the Neo Democrats, Kwok Wing-kin of the Labour Party and former president of the Chinese University of Hong Kong Students' Union Tommy Cheung.

=== Primary results ===
More than 26,000 registered voters cast their ballots in the 14 January primary, 12,438 of which turned out at the three polling stations in Kowloon West and 13,699 turned out for at five polling stations in New Territories East. Yiu Chung-yim and Gary Fan received the most votes in the generic votes as well as the overall scores in the primary, becoming the pro-democracy representatives in the Kowloon West and New Territories East by-election respectively.

Kowloon West pro-democracy primary results
Party	Candidate	Telephone polls			Generic ballots			Group votes			Total scores
Party	Candidate	Results	%	Scores	Results	%	Scores	Results	%	Scores	Total scores
Nonpartisan	Yiu Chung-yim	938	48.43	21.79	9,780	78.83	35.47	78	69.64	6.96	64.22
ADPL	Frederick Fung Kin-kee	633	32.68	14.71	2,036	16.41	7.38	16	14.29	1.43	23.52
Democratic	Ramon Yuen Hoi-man	366	18.89	8.50	591	4.76	2.14	18	16.07	1.61	12.25
Rejected		179			31			5			
Total		2,115	100	45	12,438	100	45	117	100	10	100

New Territories East pro-democracy primary results
Party	Candidate	Telephone polls			Generic ballots			Group votes			Total scores
Party	Candidate	Results	%	Scores	Results	%	Scores	Results	%	Scores	Total scores
Neo Democrats	Gary Fan Kwok-wai	923	60.92	27.40	8,089	59.45	26.75	34	29.57	2.96	57.11
Labour	Kwok Wing-kin	287	18.94	8.53	3,058	22.47	10.11	56	48.70	4.87	23.51
Independent	Tommy Cheung Sau-yin	305	20.13	9.06	2,460	18.08	8.14	25	21.74	2.17	19.37
Rejected		241			92			0			
Total		1,756	100	45	13,699	100	45	115	100	10	100

After the primary, Frederick Fung, ranked the second in the primary, announced that he was under pressure to withdraw as a backup candidacy as agreed in the primary if Yiu Chung-yim was disqualified by the Electoral Affair Commission. "Someone from the progressive democracy bloc told me that if I ran in the poll, they would definitely send someone as well [to challenge me],” Fung said. “I hope my withdrawal will allow the hatred to dissipate." Progressive democrat legislator Eddie Chu, who earlier commented on facebook warning Fung's chance of winning as voters might refuse to vote for him and therefore the camp should not blindly abide by the agreement, denied he had been the one pressuring Fung to withdraw.

== Candidates' disqualification controversy ==
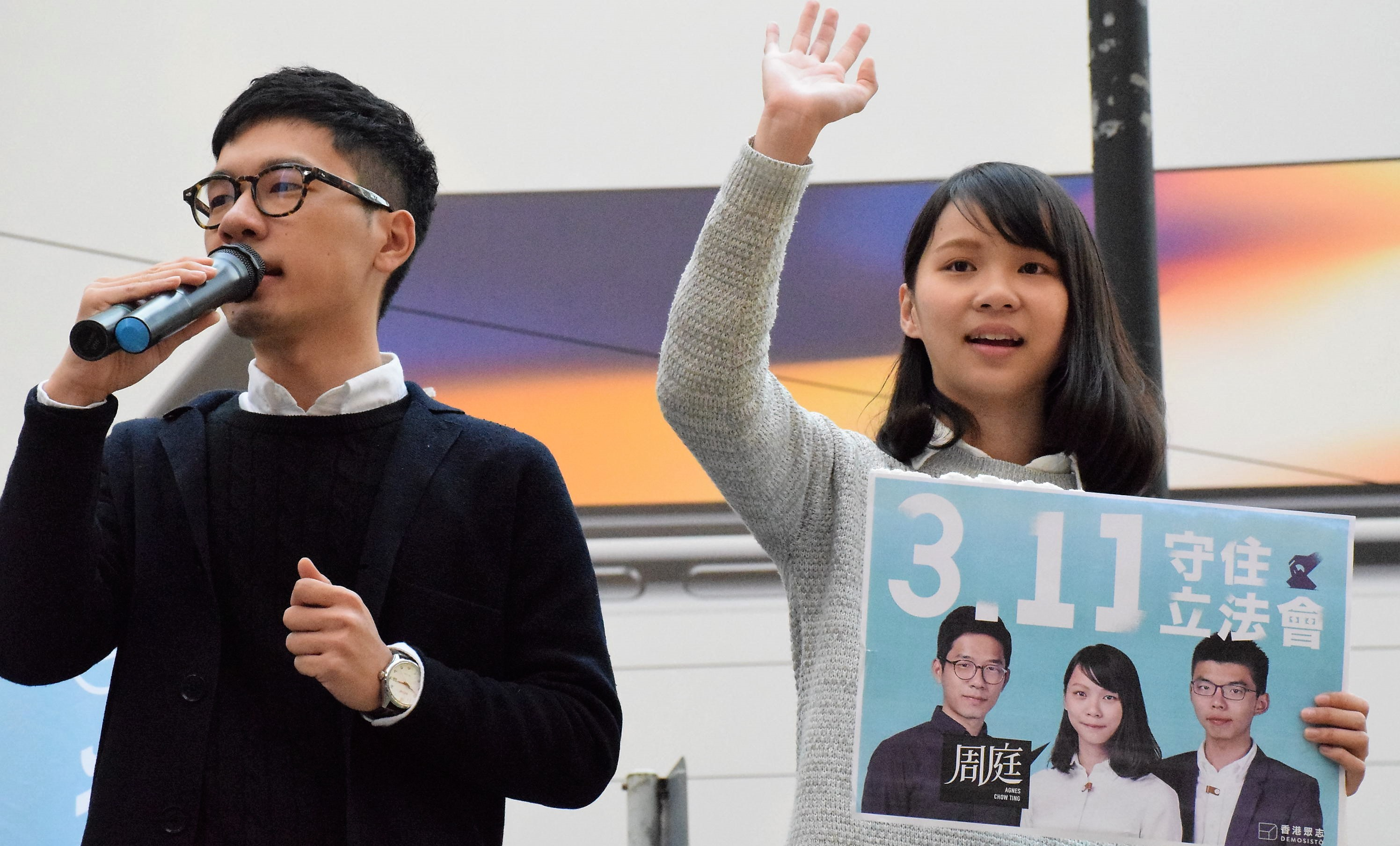
Demosistō's Agnes Chow campaigned with Nathan Law in December 2017 before her candidacy was disqualified.

Agnes Chow, Demosistō standing committee member, emerged as the party's and the pro-democrats' sole candidate in the Hong Kong Island by-election after Nathan Law's girlfriend Tiffany Yuen reportedly declined to run. Chow fulfilled the age limit of 21 after her 21st birthday on 3 December 2017. She officially announced her candidacy on 14 January 2018. On 27 January, her candidacy was invalidated by the returning officer as she claimed that "the candidate cannot possibly comply with the requirements of the relevant electoral laws, since advocating or promoting 'self-determination' is contrary to the content of the declaration that the law requires a candidate to make to uphold the Basic Law and pledge allegiance to the [Hong Kong Special Administrative Region]." The European Union issued a statement warning that banning Chow from the by-election "risks diminishing Hong Kong’s international reputation as a free and open society". The pro-democracy camp supported its backup candidate Au Nok-hin running on behalf of Chow.

Yiu Chung-yim, who was rumoured that his candidacy could be foiled on the basis of National People's Congress Standing Committee interpretation of the Basic Law being applied to the entire term of the current legislature, survived the disqualification. Ramon Yuen, who became the backup candidate after the runner-up in the pro-democracy primary Frederick Fung declared he would not be the backup candidate, initially submitted his nomination amid the rumours, withdrew his candidacy hours afterward after Yiu's candidacy was validated by the returning officer on the last day of the nomination period on 29 January.

The candidacies of two other localists, Sha Tin District Councillor James Chan Kwok-keung and convenor of the Shatin Community Network Ventus Lau Wing-hong who ran in the New Territories East, were also disqualified by the returning officer Amy Chan Yuen-man on the grounds that they had advocated Hong Kong independence, even though Lau had earlier made a declaration suggesting he no longer supported the idea. Chan also claimed that he was never an independence advocate but an advocate of "communism out of Hong Kong."

== Validated candidates ==
=== Hong Kong Island ===
- Judy Chan Ka-pui, member of the New People's Party and Southern District Council declared her candidacy on 15 January 2018. She was supported by the pro-Beijing Democratic Alliance for the Betterment and Progress of Hong Kong (DAB) and the Hong Kong Federation of Trade Unions (FTU).
- Au Nok-hin, member of the Southern District Council, former member of the Democratic Party and former convenor of the Civil Human Rights Front was the representative for the pro-democracy camp after the initial candidate Agnes Chow of Demosistō was disqualified. A candidate for the 2016 Legislative Council election in Wholesale and Retail constituency, Au had earlier quit the Democratic Party "to pursue his own political beliefs" and ran as an independent democrat.
- Edward Yum Liang-hsien, former League of Social Democrats (LSD) and People Power member, also declared his candidacy in the election.
- Ng Dick-hay, spokesman of the pro-Beijing activist group Defend Hong Kong Campaign also ran in the election as a nonpartisan.

=== Kowloon West ===
- Vincent Cheng Wing-shun, Sham Shui Po District Councillor and member of the Democratic Alliance for the Betterment and Progress of Hong Kong (DAB) became the party's candidate after defeating Yau Tsim Mong District Council chairman Chris Ip Ngo-tung in an intra-party selection.
- Yiu Chung-yim, initially a member of the Legislative Council for Architectural, Surveying, Planning and Landscape who was disqualified over the oath-taking controversy became the pro-democracy representative in the election after defeating Frederick Fung and Ramon Yuen in the pro-democracy primary in January 2018.
- Jonathan Tsoi Tung-chau, physiotherapist and a former member of the Democratic Alliance for the Betterment and Progress of Hong Kong also submitted his candidacy.

=== New Territories East ===
- Tang Ka-piu, Hong Kong Federation of Trade Unions (FTU) member, member of the Islands District Council, former Legislative Council member for the Labour functional constituency and 2016 Legislative Council candidate for New Territories East, joined the Democratic Alliance for the Betterment and Progress of Hong Kong (DAB) ahead of the election to represent the whole pro-Beijing camp.
- Gary Fan Kwok-wai, member of Neo Democrats and Sai Kung District Council and former Legislative Councillor from 2012 to 2016, stood in the pro-democracy primary against Kwok Wing-kin and Tommy Cheung. He emerged as the pro-democracy representative after winning the primary in January 2018.
- Estella "Jenny" Chan Yuk-ngor, a pro-Beijing activist who ran against the pro-democracy candidates in the 2016 election again submitted her candidacy in the election.
- Christine Fong Kwok-shan, a Sai Kung District Councillor and 2008, 2012, 2016 by-election and general election candidate in which she failed to get elected with a margin of 51 votes in her last attempt, ran in the constituency for the fifth time under the banner of "Livelihood First".
- Joyce Chiu Pui-yuk, a Christian activist and member of the Family School SODO (Sexual Orientation Discrimination Ordinance) Concern Group, also ran in the election.
- Wong Sing-chi, former Democratic Party Legislative Council member for New Territories East from 2000 to 2004 and from 2008 to 2012 and a former Third Side member who ran in the 2016 by-election in New Territories East and general election in the Social Welfare functional constituency, also stood in the election.

=== Architectural, Surveying, Planning and Landscape ===
- Tony Tse Wai-chuen, member of Legislative Council for Architectural, Surveying and Planning from 2012 to 2016 who lost to Yiu Chung-yim due to more than one pro-Beijing candidates splitting the votes in the 2016 re-election, intended to retake his seat.
- Paul Zimmerman, Southern District Councillor and member of the Election Committee Architectural, Surveying, Planning & Landscape Subsector, announced his candidacy as an independent democrat under the banner of "CoVision" on 14 January 2018.

== Results ==
Some 904,000 of 2.1 million registered voters in the four constituencies cast their ballots with the turnout rate of 43 per cent, 15 per cent lower than the 2016 general election. The pro-democrats underperformed in the poll, which saw their vote share dropping significantly from the traditional 55 per cent to only 47 per cent. The result in the Kowloon West constituency was a surprise reversal as Vincent Cheng of the Democratic Alliance for the Betterment and Progress of Hong Kong (DAB) narrowly defeated pro-democrat independent Yiu Chung-yim by a margin of 1.1 per cent. Yiu requested a recount at 5am but only confirmed his defeat in the constituency, which made it the first time the pro-Beijing camp received greater vote share than the pro-democrats in a geographical constituency since the 2000 Legislative Council election in Kowloon East where DAB's Chan Yuen-han and Chan Kam-lam topped the poll with a margin of 2.1 per cent compared to the Democratic Party's Szeto Wah and Fred Li. It was also the first time a pro-Beijing candidate won in a geographical constituency by-election since the 1992 New Territories West by-election. Prior to that, the pro-democrats had never lost in a single-member district direct election in the SAR period. It also continued the pro-Beijing dominance in the geographical constituencies after the oath-taking disqualification with a one-seat majority.

=== Hong Kong Island ===
Hong Kong Island result by District Council constituency.

Hong Kong Island
Party	Candidate	Votes	%	±%
Independent	Au Nok-hin	137,181	50.70	
NPP	Judy Kapui Chan	127,634	47.17	
Nonpartisan	Edward Yum Liang-hsien	3,580	1.32	
Nonpartisan	Ng Dick-hay	2,202	0.81	
Majority		9,547	3.53	
Total valid votes		270,597	100.00	
Rejected ballots		2,377		
Turnout		272,974	43.80	
Registered electors		623,273		
Independent gain from Demosisto		Swing		

Popular vote
Au	50.70%
Chan	47.17%
Yum	1.32%
Ng	0.81%

=== Kowloon West ===
Kowloon West result by District Council constituency.

Kowloon West
Party	Candidate	Votes	%	±%
DAB	Vincent Cheng Wing-shun	107,479	49.91	
Nonpartisan	Yiu Chung-yim	105,060	48.79	
Nonpartisan	Jonathan Tsoi Tung-chau	2,794	1.30	
Majority		2,419	1.12	
Total valid votes		215,333	100.00	
Rejected ballots		1,562		
Turnout		216,895	44.31	
Registered electors		489,451		
DAB gain from Youngspiration		Swing		

Popular vote
Cheng	49.91%
Yiu	48.79%
Tsoi	1.30%

=== New Territories East ===
New Territories East result by District Council constituency.

New Territories East
Party	Candidate	Votes	%	±%
Neo Democrats	Gary Fan Kwok-wai	183,762	44.57	
FTU (DAB)	Tang Ka-piu	152,904	37.08	
Livelihood First	Christine Fong Kwok-shan	64,905	15.74	
Independent	Wong Sing-chi	6,182	1.50	
Nonpartisan	Joyce Chiu Pui-yuk	3,068	0.74	
Independent	Estella Chan Yuet-ngor	1,504	0.36	
Majority		30,858	7.49	
Total valid votes		412,325	100.00	
Rejected ballots		4,363		
Turnout		416,688	42.13	
Registered electors		988,986		
Neo Democrats gain from Youngspiration		Swing		

Popular vote
Fan	44.57%
Tang	37.08%
Fong	15.74%
Wong	1.50%
Chiu	0.74%
Chan	0.36%

=== Architectural, Surveying, Planning and Landscape ===
Architectural, Surveying, Planning and Landscape
Party	Candidate	Votes	%	±%
Nonpartisan	Tony Tse Wai-chuen	2,929	55.54	+20.51
Independent	Paulus Johannes Zimmerman	2,345	44.46	+1.02
Majority		584	11.08	
Total valid votes		5,274	100.00	
Rejected ballots		118		
Turnout		5,392	70.77	
Registered electors		7,619		
Nonpartisan gain from Nonpartisan		Swing		

Popular vote
Tse	55.54%
Zimmerman	44.46%

== Aftermath ==
On 13 March 2018, businessman Wong Tai-hoi of the Taxi Drivers & Operators Association accompanied by former legislator Wong Kwok-hing of the Hong Kong Federation of Trade Unions (FTU) lodged a judicial review application challenging Au Nok-hin and returning officer Anne Teng Yu-yan, who approved Au’s candidacy to run in the by-election, claiming that Au was ineligible to run because he burned a copy of the Basic Law during a protest against Beijing’s interpretation of the Basic Law over the oath-taking controversy on 2 November 2016. The application was however rejected by the court on 29 March.

In September 2019, Court of First Instance Judge Anderson Chow overturned the returning officers' decision to disqualify Agnes Chow and Ventus Lau in the by-elections respectively, on the basis of that the disqualified candidates were not given any reasonable opportunity to respond to the returning officers' questions which led to their ineligibility. The decisions meant that the winners of the Hong Kong Island and New Territories East, Au Nok-hin and Gary Fan, were not duly elected and therefore lost their seats. Au and Fan appealed to the High Court but was refused to be heard on the ground that the duo had no appeal basis.

== See also ==
- 2010 Hong Kong by-election
- Hong Kong LegCo candidates' disqualification controversy
- 2018 Kowloon West by-election
- List of Hong Kong by-elections
- 2016 New Territories East by-election
