= Patrick Lau =

Hong Kong architect and politician (born 1944)

Patrick Lau Sau-shing SBS
- 劉秀成
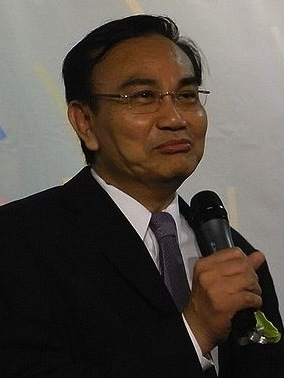
- Patrick Lau at the Chingying Institute of Visual Arts Design Show 2010

Member of the Legislative Council of Hong Kong
- In office 1 October 2004 – 30 September 2012
- Preceded by: Lau Ping-cheung
- Succeeded by: Tony Tse
- Constituency: Architectural, Surveying and Planning

Personal details
- Born: 1 June 1944 (age 81) Macau
- Spouse: Ruby Lau Fu Lut-bing
- Children: Alexander Lau Gi-mun; Pandora Lau Sei-mun
- Education: St. Paul's College
- Alma mater: University of Manitoba (BArch); University of East Asia (MBA)
- Occupation: Architect professor

Patrick Lau
- Traditional Chinese: 劉秀成
- Simplified Chinese: 刘秀成
Transcriptions

Patrick Lau Sau-shing SBS is a Hong Kong architect, legislative councillor, educator and civil servant. He had been a representative on the Legislative Council of Hong Kong (LegCo) as a member for the Architectural, Surveying and Planning Functional Constituency, as well as a member of the Professional Forum party, between 2004 and 2012.

Between 1996 and 2000, he was head of the Department of Architecture, The University of Hong Kong.

== Background ==
Lau was a student of St Paul's College, Hong Kong. After going to Canada, he graduated from the University of Manitoba in 1969 and returned to Hong Kong to teach at the University of Hong Kong in 1973. He earned his Master of Business Administration in 1988. From 1996 to 2000, he served as the head of the Department of Architecture, The University of Hong Kong. He is a Fellow Member and Past President of the Hong Kong Institute of Architects (HKIA) as well as Honorary University Fellow, Honorary Professor and former Head/Professor of Architecture at the University of Hong Kong.

He is a designer for the following schools in Hong Kong:

- French International School
- Hong Kong International School
- West Island School

== Affiliations ==
- Hong Kong Housing Authority

Legislative Council of Hong Kong
Preceded by Lau Ping-cheung	Member of Legislative Council; Representative for Architectural, Surveying and Planning; 2004–2012	Succeeded by Tony Tse
