= Kaizer Lau =

Hong Kong surveyor and politician (born 1951)

Kaizer Lau Ping-cheung GBS
- 劉炳章

Member of the Legislative Council
- In office 1 October 2000 – 30 September 2004
- Preceded by: Edward Ho
- Succeeded by: Patrick Lau
- Constituency: Architectural, Surveying and Planning

Personal details
- Born: 3 October 1951 (age 75) Chaozhou, China
- Education: Hong Kong Polytechnic (HD); University of Hong Kong (MS)
- Occupation: Professional surveyor

Kaizer Lau Ping-cheung, GBS (born 3 October 1951, Chiu Chow, Guangdong, China) is a surveyor and was the member of the Legislative Council of Hong Kong in 2000–04 for the Architectural, Surveying and Planning constituency and non executive director of the Urban Renewal Authority. He is the fellow of the Royal Institution of Chartered Surveyors and Hong Kong Institute of Surveyors.

Lau is also a non-official member of the Lantau Development Advisory Committee (LanDAC), which has controversially proposed developing Lantau Island to house up to one million residents (up from the current population of around 100,000). Lau stated that the proposed developments were "relatively small scale and would not pose much conflict with conservation", though the area marked for "conservation" actually includes large-scale commercial development such as the construction of resort hotels at Cheung Sha.

Lau also served as the deputy director of the election campaign of Leung Chun-ying in the run-up to the 2012 Chief Executive election. Leung won a five-year term, beginning on 1 July 2012, with 689 votes. Speaking on the upcoming 2017 election, Lau stated that CY Leung would run again, and that the grievances of young people during his administration were not "genuine" and that they had "overly high expectations". He also stated that Leung could have achieved more were it not for filibustering by pan-democratic legislators.

Legislative Council of Hong Kong
Preceded by Edward Ho	Member of Legislative Council; Representative for Architectural, Surveying and Planning; 2000–2004	Succeeded by Patrick Lau
