= Edward Ho =

Hong Kong politician

Edward Ho Sing-tin SBS OBE JP
- 何承天

Member of the Legislative Council
- In office 1 October 1987 – 22 August 1991
- Appointed by: Sir David Wilson
- Constituency: Appointed
- In office 9 October 1991 – 30 June 1997
- Constituency: Architectural, Surveying and Planning
- In office 21 December 1996 – 30 April 1998
- Constituency: Provisional Legislative Council
- In office 1 July 1998 – 30 June 2000
- Constituency: Architectural, Surveying and Planning

Member of the Executive Council of Hong Kong
- In office 1 November 1991 – 7 October 1992
- Appointed by: Sir David Wilson

Personal details
- Born: 2 December 1938 (age 87) Hong Kong
- Party: Liberal
- Spouse: Eva Chia Ho
- Education: University of Hong Kong (BArch)
- Profession: Architect, politician

Edward Ho Sing-tin (Chinese: 何承天), SBS, OBE, JP, FHKIA (born 1938) is a Hong Kong politician and architect.

== Section ==
He has served as:

- Hong Kong Institute of Architects, President (1983–84)
- Board of Hong Kong Industrial Estates Corporation, Chairman (1992–2001)
- Accreditation Panel on the Hong Kong Academy for Performing Arts (1988), member
- Hong Kong Basic Law Consultative Committee member (1985–89)
- Legislative Council member (1987–2000);
- Executive Council member (1991–92)

He is an independent non-executive director and member of the Board of the MTR Corporation (since 1991). He was a founding member of the Liberal Party of Hong Kong, and one of the longest-serving Legislative Council members.

He was appointed to the General Committee of the Hong Kong Philharmonic Society, whose Chief Executive re-appointed Ho as Chairman of the General Committee of the HKPS from 1 November 2005 to 31 October 2006.

Legislative Council of Hong Kong
| New constituency | Member of Legislative Council; Representative for Architectural, Surveying and Planning; 1991–1997 | Replaced by Provisional Legislative Council |
| New parliament | Member of Provisional Legislative Council; 1997–1998 | Replaced by Legislative Council |
| New parliament | Member of Legislative Council; Representative for Architectural, Surveying and Planning; 1998–2000 | Succeeded by Lau Ping-cheung |
