= Hong Kong Legislative Council oath of office controversy =

2016 political controversy in Hong Kong

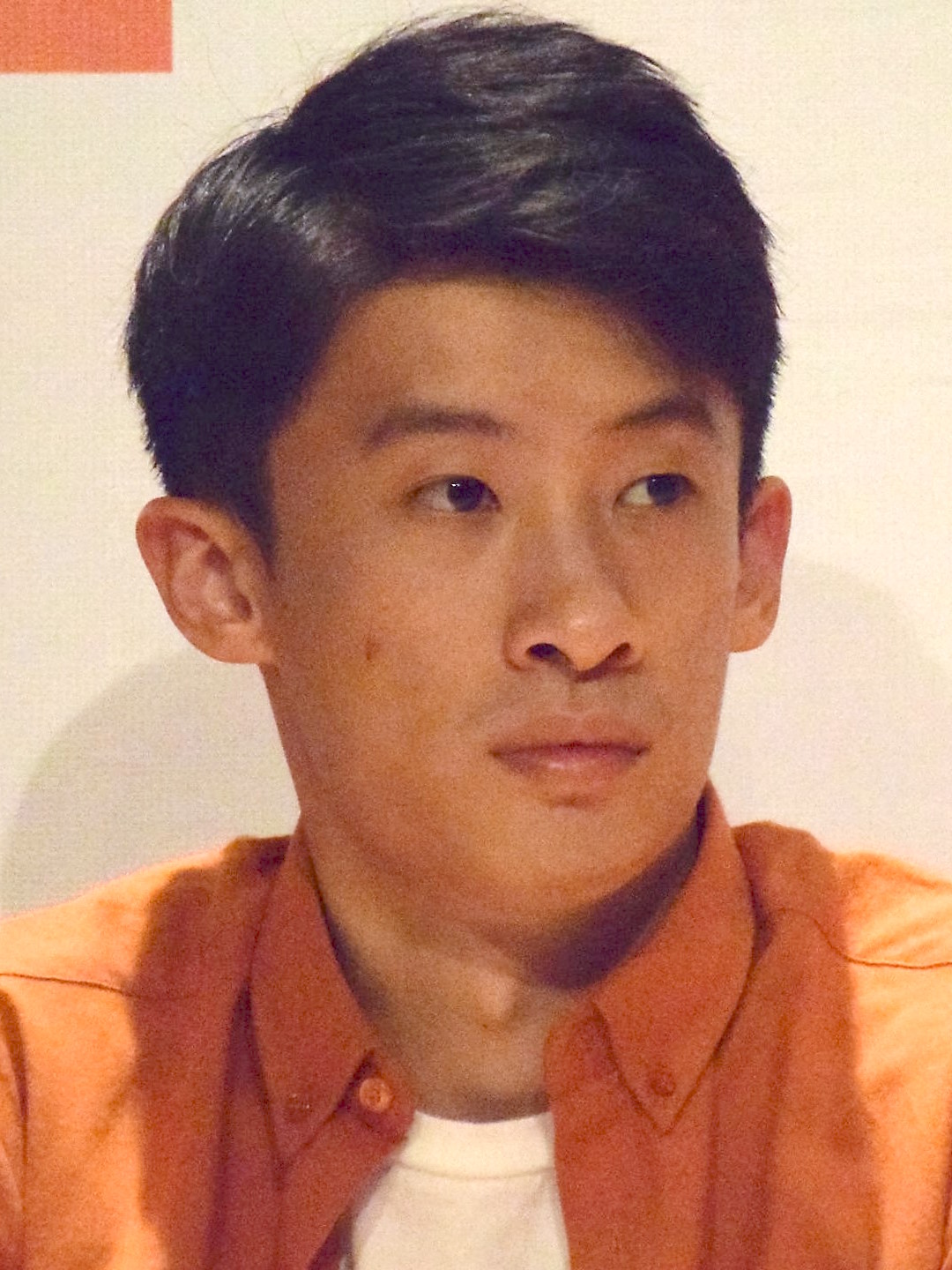
Sixtus Leung

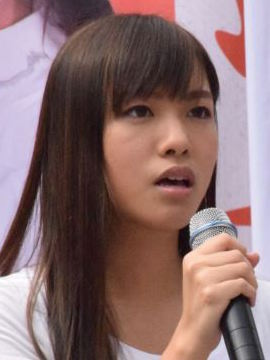
Yau Wai-ching

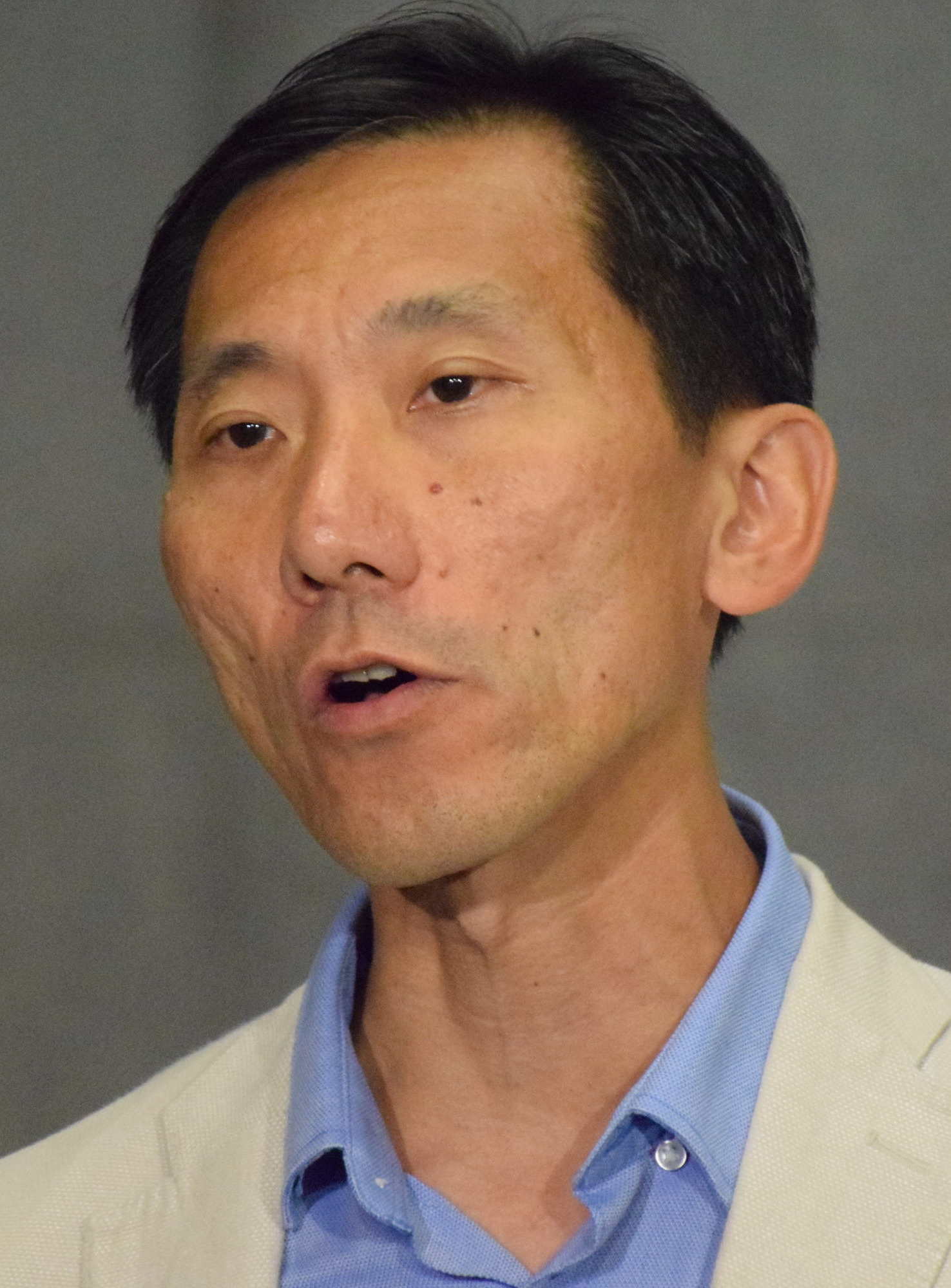
Yiu Chung-yim

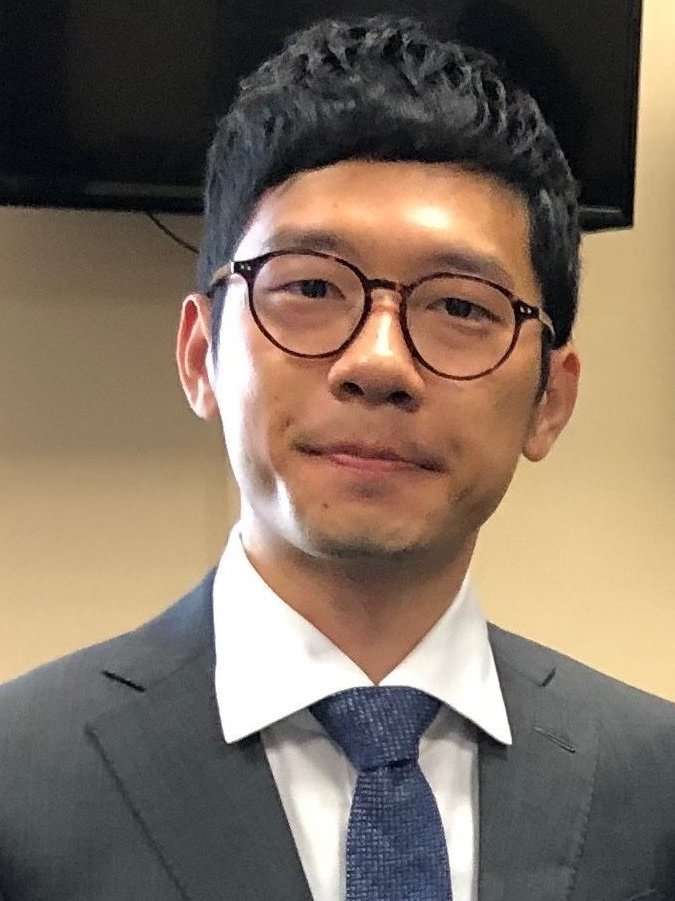
Nathan Law

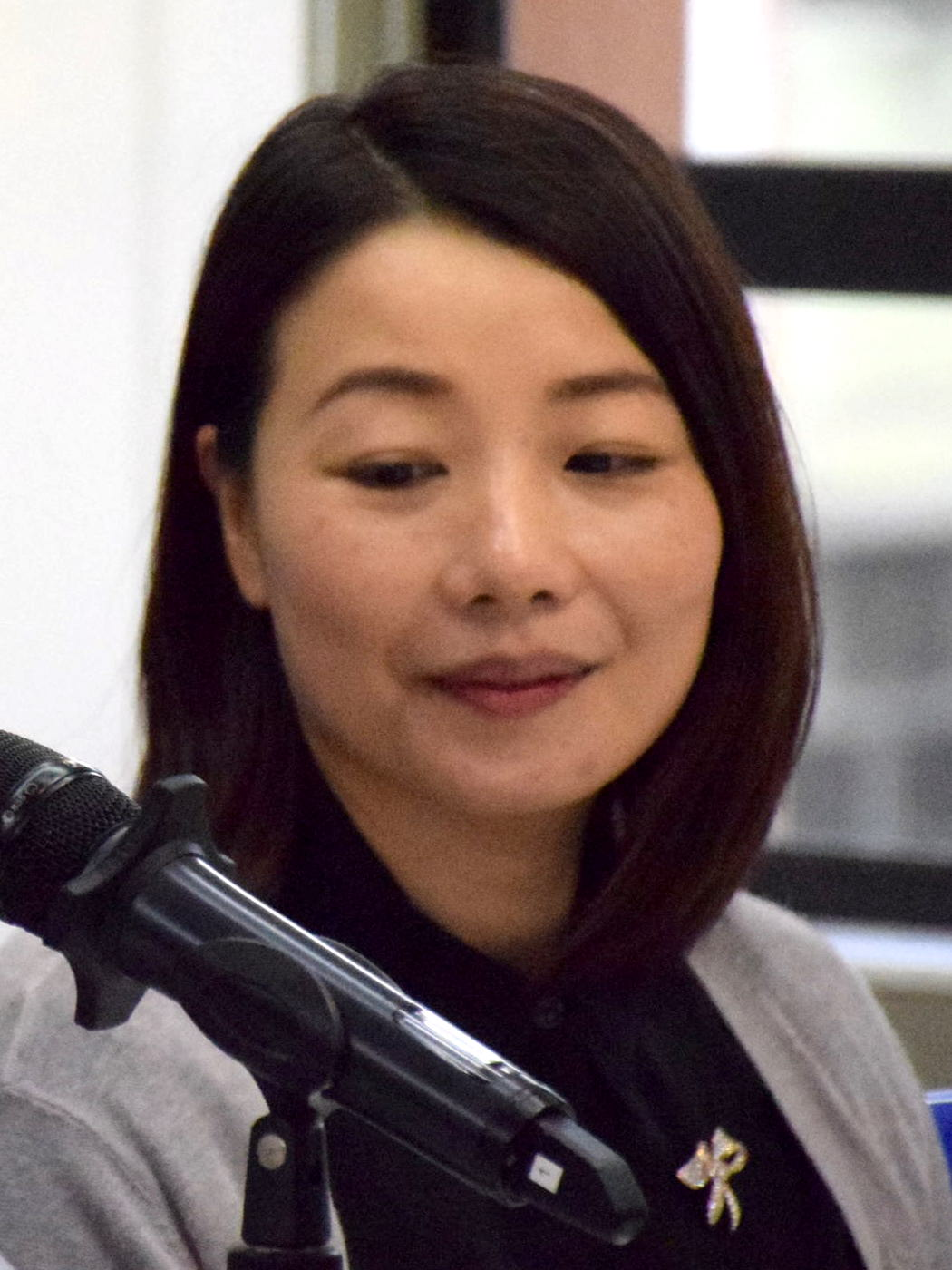
Lau Siu-lai

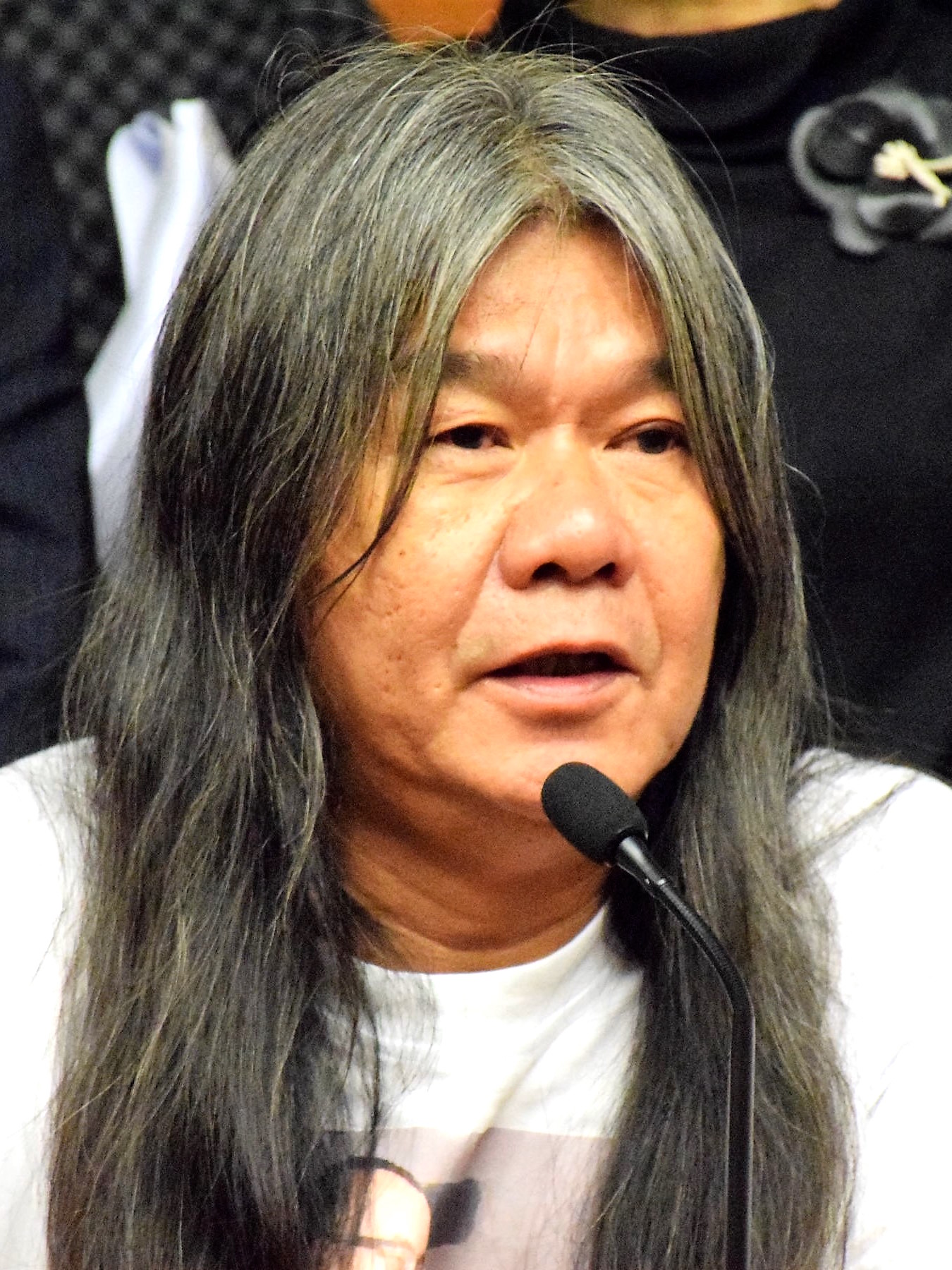
Leung Kwok-hung

The Hong Kong Legislative Council members' oath-taking controversy was a series of events surrounding the oaths of office of a dozen pro-democracy and localist camp members-elect of the Legislative Council of Hong Kong (LegCo) on 12 October 2016 which have resulted in the disqualification of six members, Sixtus "Baggio" Leung and Yau Wai-ching of Youngspiration, who were unseated by the court on 15 November 2016, and Leung Kwok-hung, Nathan Law, Yiu Chung-yim and Lau Siu-lai on 14 July 2017.

The pro-democracy members-elect have used the oath-taking ceremonies at each inaugural meeting as a platform of protest since 2004, during which they have held objects or shouted slogans. On 12 October 2016, the inaugural meeting of the 6th Legislative Council, a dozen of members-elect used the occasion to protest, highlighted by the pro-independence Youngspiration legislators, Sixtus Leung and Yau Wai-ching, who asserted "as a member of the Legislative Council, I shall pay earnest efforts in keeping guard over the interests of the Hong Kong nation," displayed a "Hong Kong is not China" banner, and mispronounced "People's Republic of China" as "people's re-fucking of Chee-na". (Note: Hong Kong Government Cantonese Romanisation uses the same "ch" letter combination to represent both aspirated chʼ and unaspirated ch, and omits the diacritics. English readers may find this spelling confusing and mispronounce the sounds.Yale romanization of Cantonese, on the other hand, uses different letters to represent these two sounds. The Yale Romanization for these two characters is "ji1 na5". To enable English readers to produce a pronunciation closest to the Cantonese, spelling it as "Jee-na" would be more appropriate.) As a result, the oaths of the two, as well as that of Yiu Chung-yim, who also inserted his own words, were invalidated by the LegCo secretary-general Kenneth Chen and the oath of Lau Siu-lai, who spent about ten minutes reading the 80-word oath in extreme slow motion, was invalidated by the LegCo President Andrew Leung.

The controversy escalated when Chief Executive Leung Chun-ying and Secretary for Justice Rimsky Yuen, on 18 October, unprecedentedly launched a judicial review seeking the disqualification of Sixtus Leung and Yau Wai-ching. This was followed by the walkout staged by pro-Beijing legislators to force adjournment and block the pair and Lau Siu-lai from retaking their oaths on the following day after Yiu Chung-yim had retaken his oath. Lau Siu-lai eventually retook her oath on 2 November.

On 7 November 2016, despite the pan-democrats' opposition, the National People's Congress Standing Committee (NPCSC) controversially interpreted Article 104 of the Basic Law of Hong Kong to "clarify" the requirements that the legislators need to swear allegiance to Hong Kong as part of China when they take office, stating that a person "who intentionally reads out words which do not accord with the wording of the oath prescribed by law, or takes the oath in a manner which is not sincere or not solemn" should be barred from taking their public office and cannot retake the oath. As a consequence, the court disqualified Sixtus Leung and Yau Wai-ching on 15 November. The oaths of a dozen of pro-democracy legislators and a few pro-Beijing legislators were also under legal challenges.

On 2 December 2016, the government launched a second legal action against four more pro-democracy legislators, Leung Kwok-hung of the League of Social Democrats, Nathan Law of Demosistō, Yiu Chung-yim and Lau Siu-lai, over their manners at the oath-taking ceremony. As a result, the four legislators were disqualified by the court on 14 July 2017.

== Background ==
According to Article 104 of the Basic Law of Hong Kong, members of the Legislative Council must swear to uphold the Basic Law and swear allegiance to the Hong Kong Special Administrative Region of the People's Republic of China. According to the Oaths and Declarations Ordinance, the Legislative Council oath is:

I swear that, being a member of the Legislative Council of the Hong Kong Special Administrative Region of the People's Republic of China, I will uphold the Basic Law of the Hong Kong Special Administrative Region of the People's Republic of China, bear allegiance to the Hong Kong Special Administrative Region of the People's Republic of China and serve the Hong Kong Special Administrative Region conscientiously, dutifully, in full accordance with the law, honestly and with integrity.

The oath of office ceremony of the Legislative Council of Hong Kong (LegCo) has been the platform of protest of some pro-democracy legislators since 2004, when radical democrat legislator Leung Kwok-hung shouted the slogan "Long live democracy! Long live the people!" before and after delivering the oath in full at the inaugural meeting of the 3rd Legislative Council; Leung's oath at that time was validated by the clerk of the Legislative Council Ricky Fung. Leung kept his practice of protesting at the each oath-taking ceremony and this practice was followed by some other pan-democrats.

In 2012, People Power legislator Wong Yuk-man skipped key words in the oath by coughing at strategic moments when taking the oath and his oath was invalidated by LegCo President Jasper Tsang. He was allowed to retake his oath during the next meeting. Even though he read out part of his second oath in a different tone of voice and shouted "Down with the Hong Kong communist regime, down with Leung Chun-ying" after completing the oath, and was challenged by pro-Beijing legislator Paul Tse for taking the oath in this way, the oath was accepted by the President.

In the 2016 Legislative Council election held on 4 September 2016, six localist candidates with different agendas striving for the "self-determination" of Hong Kong were elected with 19 percent of the total votes even though the Electoral Affairs Commission (EAC) had made the unprecedented move to disqualify six other localist nominees (including Hong Kong Indigenous' Edward Leung, who ran in the February's New Territories East by-election) as candidates of the election on the grounds that they supported Hong Kong independence. Leung campaigned for Youngspiration's Sixtus Leung, 30, who stood in the same constituency as a "back up" plan. Leung was duly elected with 37,997 votes. His party colleague, Yau Wai-ching, 25, also won the last seat in Kowloon West with 20,643 votes, becoming the youngest female to be elected to the legislature.

== Course of events ==
=== Oaths invalidated ===
On 11 October 2016, a day before the inaugural session of the 6th Legislative Council, the government issued a statement warning the members-elect of the Legislative Council to swear to uphold the Basic Law and swear allegiance to the Hong Kong Special Administrative Region of the People's Republic of China as required by the Article 104 of the Basic Law.

On 12 October 2016, five localist and eight pro-democrat legislators used the oath-taking ceremony as a platform of protest as they had in the previous sessions, by either shouting slogans or making extra statements before or after taking their oaths. Leung Kwok-hung of the League of Social Democrats (LSD), who had used the oath-taking ceremony as a platform of protest since 2004, held a yellow umbrella symbolising the Umbrella Revolution with many words thereon, including "ending one-party rule", and a paper board showing the words "NPC 831 decision" and a cross on it. He paused many times while reading the oath and tore a piece of paper with the words "NPC 831 decision". Newcomers such as Nathan Law of Demosistō had raised his tone when swearing allegiance to China, sounding like he was asking a question, while Lau Siu-lai paused for six seconds in between every word in order to, she said, make the oath meaningless.

However, the oaths of the independent pan-democrat Yiu Chung-yim, Youngspiration's Sixtus Leung and Yau Wai-ching were invalidated by LegCo secretary-general Kenneth Chen. Yiu added phrases such as "universal suffrage" immediately after his oath. Leung and Yau pledged allegiance to the "Hong Kong nation" before they took the oath while displaying a banner that read "Hong Kong is not China". They also pronounced "People's Republic of China" as "people's re-fucking of Chee-na", a variation of the term Shina, which was used by Japan to refer to China and was deemed derogatory since the Second World War, three times. The three oaths were declared invalid, with the effect that the trio could not vote in the subsequent election of the LegCo President, in which Andrew Leung of the Business and Professionals Alliance for Hong Kong (BPA) was controversially elected.

=== Condemnation ===
The Hong Kong SAR government denounced the duo for modifying their oaths and hurting the feelings of Chinese people, labelling their actions as "in violation of the dignity expected of LegCo members, or even spoke or acted in an offensive manner that harmed the feelings of our compatriots." Chief Executive Leung Chun-ying said many people were "angry and disappointed" over the oath-taking process. "This seriously affects the feelings between Hong Kong and mainland people," he added. China's state media Xinhua quoted a "person-in-charge" of the Central People's Government's Liaison Office in Hong Kong on 14 October as expressing "strong anger and condemnation" over the two legislators' "despicable words and actions" which "has challenged the nation's dignity and severely hurt the feelings of all Chinese people and overseas Chinese, including Hong Kong compatriots."

Sixtus Leung blamed his "Ap Lei Chau accent" as the reason of his pronunciation of "China" as "Chee-na" and the alleged profanity. He also argued that the word "Chee-na" is not offensive as "Dr Sun Yat-sen used the term 'Chee-na' when he was lobbying overseas." He also argued that the "Hong Kong is not China" slogan was a factual statement, "just like 'apple is not orange'." His action and explanation were attacked in an opinion article written for South China Morning Post as "kindergarten-like". A group of Ap Lei Chau residents issued a joint statement rejecting his excuse, saying that "[Sixtus] Leung Chung-hang's terrible action has made those of us who were born and bred in Ap Lei Chau angry."

On the other hand, secretary-general Kenneth Chen's decision to invalidate the three legislators' oaths was questioned. "Secretary-general ruled the oaths as invalid without consulting legal advice," Lau Siu-lai, elected on her platform for self-determination, said. "It was an unjust decision and the subsequent meeting, in which the president was elected, was therefore unlawful." The pro-Beijing camp, on the other hand, sent a petition to the LegCo president asking him to also invalidate the oaths of Nathan Law and Lau Siu-lai. Lau's oath was later invalidated by President Andrew Leung on 18 October along with that of pro-Beijing Democratic Alliance for the Betterment and Progress of Hong Kong (DAB) legislator Wong Ting-kwong (who missed the words "Hong Kong" when reading the oath) after Leung consulted lawyers. The five legislators would be allowed to retake their oaths at the next meeting on 19 October.

On 17 October, Sixtus Leung said he and Yau Wai-ching would consider compromising by retaking their oaths properly on the next meeting on 19 October to keep their seats, but both insisted they had done nothing wrong and brushed off mounting calls for an apology and their resignation, as well as threats of legal action against them. They claimed that the word "Chee-na" was referring to the regime but not to the people or culture.

Various pro-Beijing and Beijing-friendly organisations ran more than a dozen adverts in local newspapers, urging the duo to apologise or even resign, including one statement issued by more than 200 historians and educators, including former chief curator of the Hong Kong History Museum Joseph Ting Sun-pao.

=== Government's legal action ===
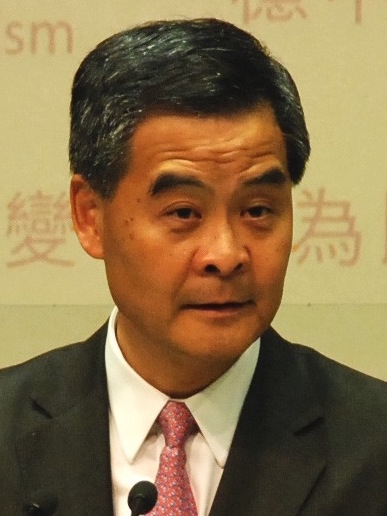
Chief executive Leung Chun-ying

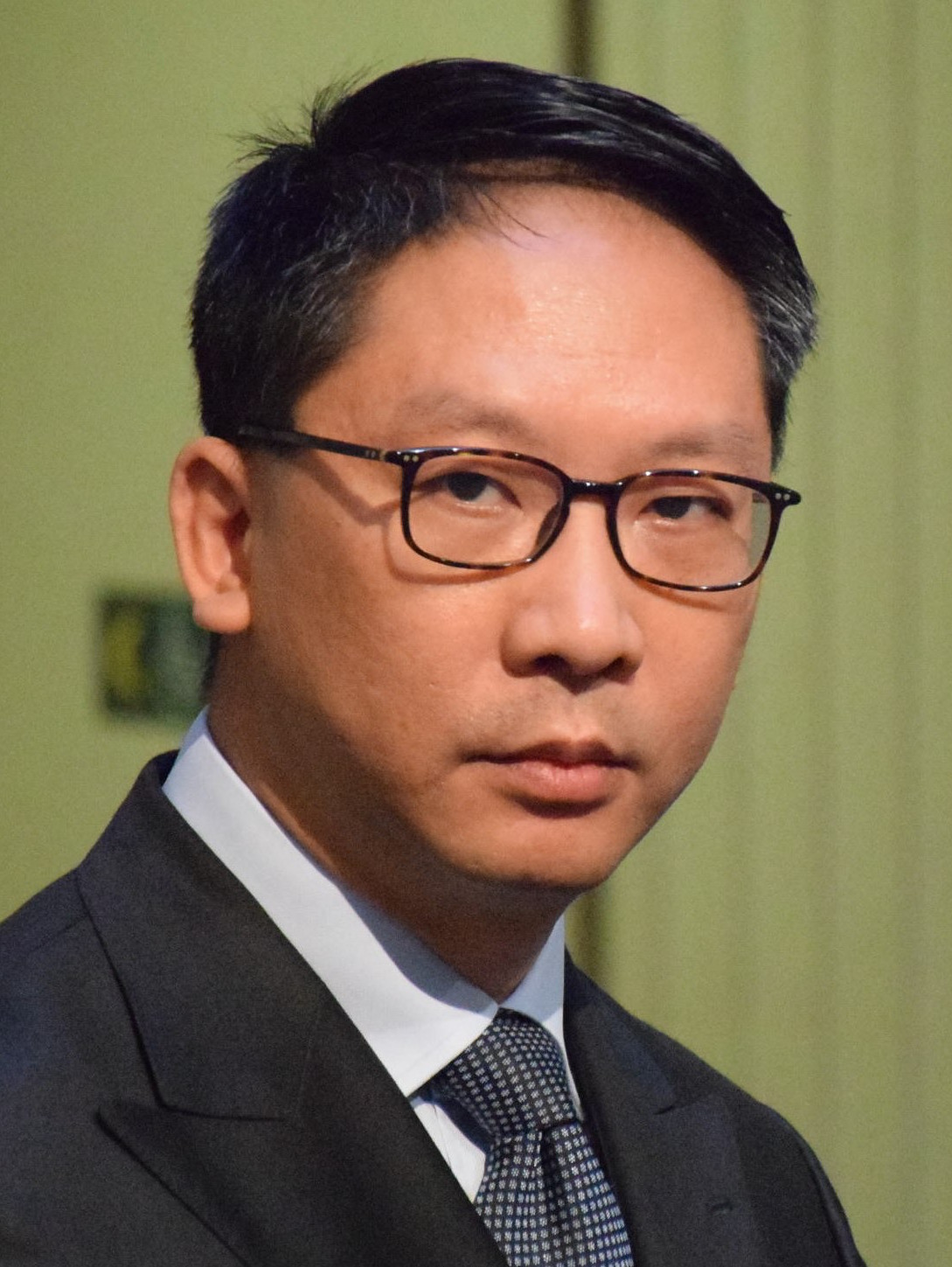
Secretary for Justice Rimsky Yuen

The two top government officials mounted a legal challenge against the Legislative Council President Andrew Leung and two Youngspiration legislators on 18 October.

On 18 October night, just hours before the next LegCo meeting, the Hong Kong government took the unprecedented step of mounting a legal challenge to disqualify two Youngspiration legislators on grounds that their actions in the oath-taking process had contravened the Basic Law. Johnny Mok Shiu-luen, SC, representing Chief Executive Leung Chun-ying and Secretary for Justice Rimsky Yuen accused the duo of "sending a message to the world and also to the public that we can function as a member of LegCo without pledging allegiance to the HKSAR of the People's Republic of China," Mok said. Jat Sew-tong, SC, acting for LegCo President Andrew Leung argued that the government's move was a "serious deprivation of the constitutional rights" of the two legislators-elect. Justice Thomas Au Hing-cheung allowed the government's application for a judicial review, but denied the government an interim injunction to bar the pair from retaking their oaths on the next meeting. The hearing on the application was set for 3 November.

The pan-democracy camp accused Leung Chun-ying of "ruining the separation of powers" by inviting the courts to intervene in LegCo's domestic affairs. "The Chief executive pays no respect to the dignity and the independence of our legislature," Civic Party legislator for Legal constituency Dennis Kwok said. Rita Fan, Hong Kong delegate to the Standing Committee of the National People's Congress and Maria Tam, member of the Basic Law Committee under the Standing Committee slammed the pan-democrats back, denying the existence of the separation of powers in the Basic Law. Fan said the Basic Law "makes no mention" of separation of powers, while Tam said separation of powers was not how Hong Kong's political structure was defined.

=== Pro-Beijing camp's walkout ===
Paul Tse, a pro-Beijing independent legislator suggested staging a walkout to force adjournment and block the two Youngspiration legislators from retaking their oaths if they did not apologise. Four pro-Beijing lawmakers, including Holden Chow and Priscilla Leung, disagreed, saying a forced adjournment would be damaging to LegCo. However, after the court's ruling, the pro-Beijing camp decided to stage the walkout at the second meeting of the Legislative Council on 19 October after Wong Ting-kwong and Yiu Chung-yim retook their oaths. Sixtus Leung, Yau Wai-ching, as well as Lau Siu-lai, who were supposed to retake the oath after Yiu, were unable to do so.

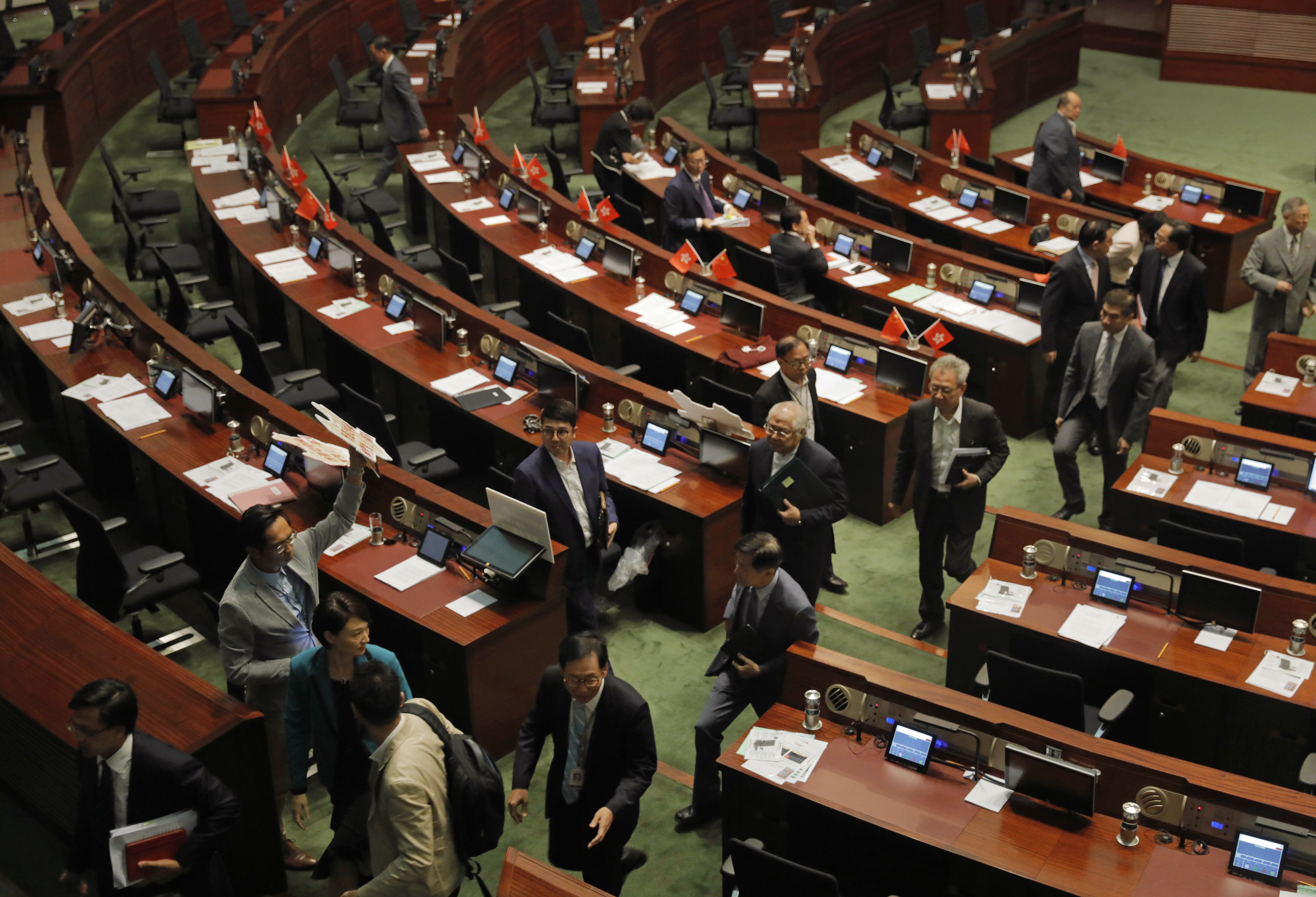
The pro-Beijing legislators staged a walkout on 19 October to force adjournment to block the Youngspiration legislators from retaking the oaths.

New People's Party chairwoman Regina Ip denied that the pro-Beijing camp and the government were buying time, although some legislators admitted that the administration's judicial review had indeed prompted them to take the step. She was quoted as arguing that such a move would cost them public support, "but why couldn't we do something when even the government has made such a move? We do not want to appear feebler than the administration". LegCo President Andrew Leung said it was "unfortunate" his colleagues chose to walk out and that he had no choice but to adjourn the meeting.

After the walkout, as pro-Beijing lawmakers met the media, explaining the rationale behind their action, radical democrat legislator "Long Hair" Leung Kwok-hung of the League of Social Democrats (LSD) threw luncheon meat at them in protest. Luncheon meat has been a symbol against filibusters in LegCo after former pro-Beijing legislator Wong Kwok-hing of the Hong Kong Federation of Trade Unions (FTU) measured the cost of long debates in terms of the amount of luncheon meat that could have been bought instead of paying the legislators.

LegCo's democratic caucus convenor Democratic Party's James To said the pro-Beijing members "blatantly adjourned the meeting with the use of rules of procedures to block lawmakers from retaking their oaths". Democrat Lam Cheuk-ting, who had originally planned to petition at the meeting setting up a select committee to investigate HK$50 million Chief executive Leung Chun-ying received from Australian engineering firm UGL, accused the pro-Beijing camp of helping the Chief executive. Civic Party legislator Dennis Kwok said the walkout was a huge blow to the city's rule of law, and disrespectful to the court system as the court had refused to grant an injunction preventing the Youngspiration pair from retaking their oaths.

After the pro-Beijing legislators walked out, localist Civic Passion's Cheng Chung-tai was seen turning the flags of China and Hong Kong, which DAB's Lau Kwok-fan had brought into the chamber, upside down. DAB's Chan Hak-kan said Cheng's act was against the law. Lau subsequently reported Cheng to the police and urged them to investigate and prosecute in accordance with the law.

=== LegCo President's on-hold decision ===
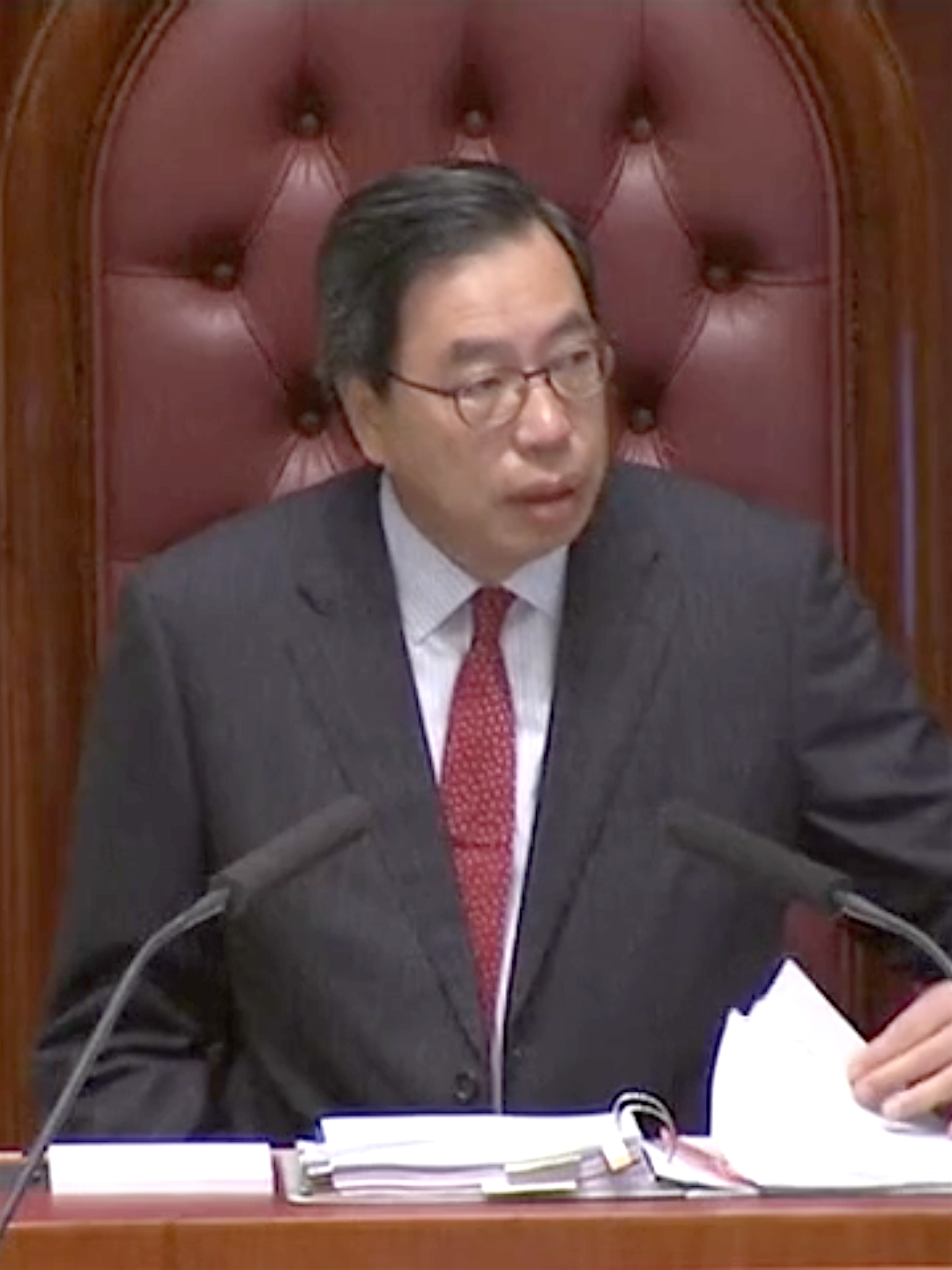
Legislative Council President Andrew Leung made a U-turn by deciding to delay the oath-taking of the two Youngspiration legislators.

On 25 October, LegCo President Andrew Leung took a U-turn by deciding to delay the oath-taking of Sixtus Leung and Yau Wai-ching on Wednesday's general meeting on 26 October, six hours after Chief executive Leung Chun-ying warned of "far-reaching repercussions" on the relationship between Hong Kong and the mainland should the matter not be "rectified". Leung cited Article 72 of the Basic Law which allows the LegCo president to decide on the agenda, even though according to Rule 18 of LegCo's rules of procedures, oath-taking is designated as the first priority of the order of LegCo's business. "I note with grave concern the intention of the pro-establishment lawmakers to forestall the [oath-taking] at all costs," Andrew Leung explained. If he let Sixtus Leung and Yau retake the oaths on 26 October, "the most probable outcome is that LegCo will come to a complete halt", as the pro-Beijing camp had threatened a second walkout to block the duo from retaking their oaths. The Youngspiration pair slammed the president for what they called a "ridiculous" reversal of his earlier decision.

On 26 October, despite Andrew Leung's ban on the two Youngspiration members entering the LegCo chamber citing Rule 1 of LegCo's rules of procedures, the duo successfully entered the chamber, escorted by at least eight pan-democracy legislators and surrounded by reporters. Andrew Leung immediately asked Sixtus Leung and Yau Wai-ching to leave when he entered the chamber. After a short suspension of the meeting, Civic Passion's Cheng Chung-tai shouted at Andrew Leung, asking him to explain why he did not allow the duo to take their oath. Leung asked Cheng to leave the premises with Sixtus Leung and Yau. All three refused. After few minutes, Andrew Leung announced the meeting to be adjourned.

The pro-democracy camp call on Andrew Leung to resign after the adjournment. "Andrew Leung is unfit to perform his role," the camp's convenor James To said. "The quorum was met, but he did not administer the oath [for the duo] in accordance with the law. In the face of the chaos, he did not know what to do but to adjourn the meeting. He has no basic competence to chair the meeting." The pro-Beijing camp blamed the adjournment on the pro-democrats. "People might have different interpretations of the rules of procedures, but they should respect the final ruling of the LegCo president," Regina Ip of the New People's Party said, referring to Andrew Leung's earlier decision to ban the Youngspiration pair from entering the chamber. Felix Chung, leader of the Liberal Party said the city was in a "constitutional crisis" as the legislature could not function at all.

On 2 November, the fourth general meeting was adjourned again after the two Youngspiration legislators Yau Wai-ching and Sixtus Leung stormed into the main chamber and tried to take the oaths on themselves after another localist Lau Siu-lai, who was not under legal challenge, successfully retook her oath. President Andrew Leung relocated the meeting to another conference room where the duo attempted to enter. Six security guards were injured and police was called before the meeting was adjourned.

=== Interpretation of the Basic Law ===
Two days before the court hearing, Chief Executive Leung Chun-ying said he could not rule out asking Beijing to interpret the Basic Law on the oath-taking row on 1 November. On 3 November in the court hearing, Benjamin Yu SC, counsel for the Chief Executive and the Secretary for Justice, argued that the constitutional provision requiring legislators to duly take the oath as stipulated in the Article 104 of the Basic Law "is at stake" and therefore the court should intervene. Hectar Pun Hei SC for Sixtus Leung and Philip Dykes SC for Yau Wai-ching argued that the Basic Law provides for a separation of powers in which the oath-taking controversy should be resolved by the Legislative Council itself through a "political process" rather than a judicial process. Justice Thomas Au Hing-cheung said he would deliver his ruling "as soon as practicable" in the light of the possibility of the interpretation of the Basic Law by the National People's Congress Standing Committee (NPCSC).

On 4 November, Maria Tam, a member of the Basic Law Committee of the NPCSC, confirmed that the committee had received a letter from Zhang Dejiang, chairman of the National People's Congress, who said Basic Law Article 104 would be interpreted and that committee members' views would be sought. A Hong Kong government spokesman also said it had been notified by the central government that an item relating to interpreting Article 104 of the Basic Law had been put on the agenda of the NPCSC. Civic Party's Dennis Kwok for the Legal constituency warned the interpretation would deal a huge blow to Hong Kong's rule of law. The Hong Kong Bar Association said it was "deeply concerned" about the reports of the interpretation of the Basic Law earlier, saying it would "deal a severe blow to the independence of the judiciary and the power of final adjudication of the Hong Kong court", if the NPCSC insisted on interpreting the Basic Law before the court's final ruling. "It will also seriously undermine the confidence of the Hong Kong people and the international community in the high degree of autonomy of [Hong Kong]," it said.

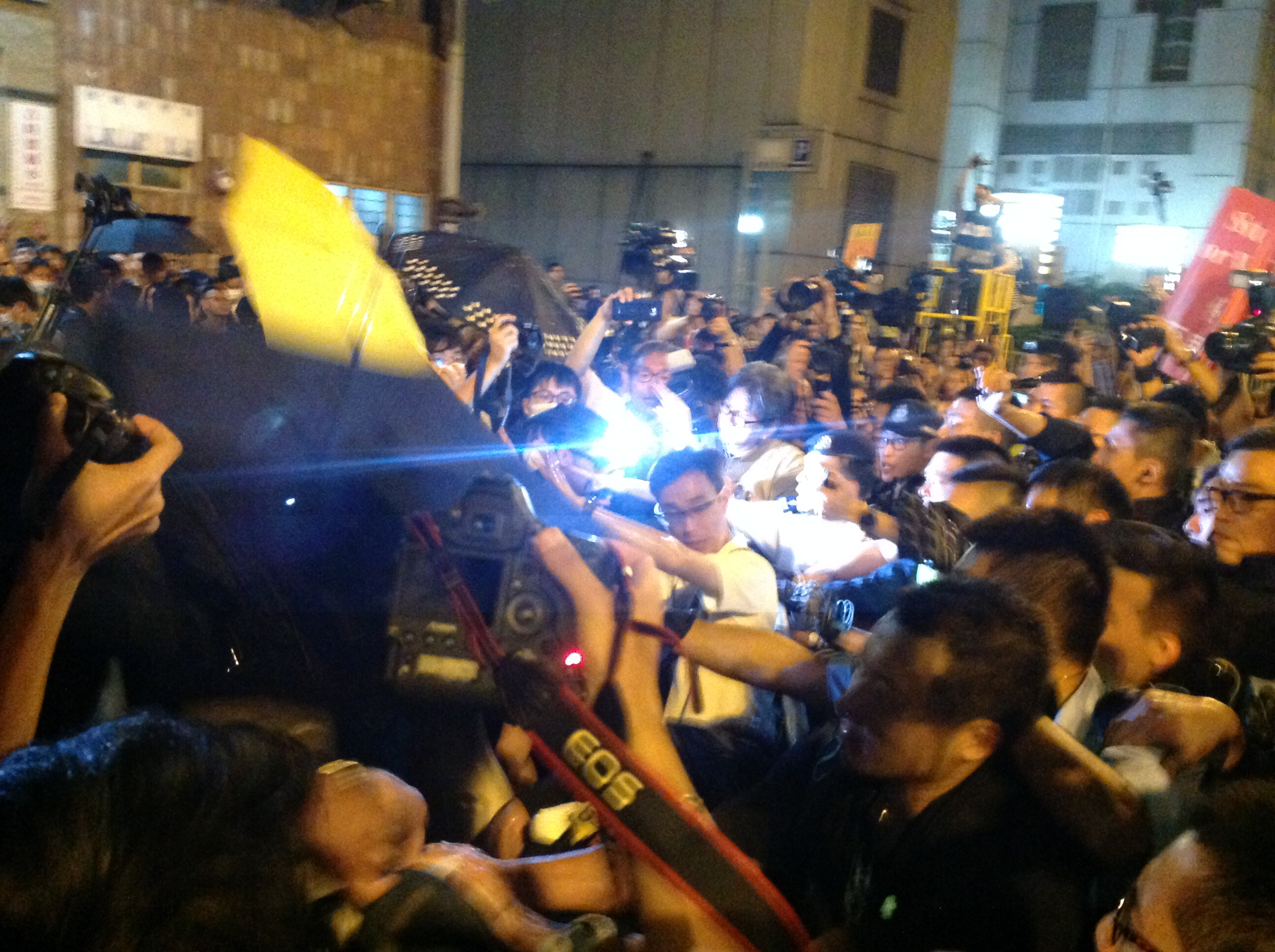
Protesters clashed with the police outside the Central Government's Liaison Office in Sai Ying Pun on 6 November.

On 6 November, between 8,000 (police figures) and 13,000 people (according to the rally organisers) protested against the interpretation of the Basic Law. Police used pepper spray to disperse protesters outside the Central Government's Liaison Office in Sai Ying Pun. Subsequently, Demosistō, Student Fight for Democracy, the League of Social Democrats and the Labour Party announced the demonstration was over and urged protesters to depart to "avoid sacrifice" in face of the "unfavourable situation". From 2 am, a squad of about 40 officers deployed with batons actively chased after protesters from Wilmer Street to Bonham Strand West to disperse those remaining. Four people were arrested and two police officers injured during the clash.

On 7 November, the NPCSC unanimously passed "The National People's Congress Standing Committee's interpretation of the Basic Law Article 104 of the Hong Kong Special Administrative Region". Under the interpretation, the person taking the LegCo member's oath should take it in a sincere and solemn manner with accurate, complete and solemn phrases such as "uphold the Basic Law of the Hong Kong Special Administrative Region of the People's Republic of China" and "bear allegiance to the Hong Kong Special Administrative Region of the People's Republic of China" as stated in the statutory text of the oath. If the oath-taker refuses to take the oath or otherwise deliberately fails to take it in the correct way, he or she cannot retake the oath and shall be disqualified from assuming public office. It also stated that the oath administrator has the duty to confirm if the oath-taking is carried out legally and complies with this interpretation and Hong Kong law. The spokesman of the Hong Kong and Macau Affairs Office stated that "[Beijing] will absolutely neither permit anyone advocating secession in Hong Kong nor allow any pro-independence activists to enter a government institution."

Following Beijing's decision, Chief Executive Leung Chun-ying said Hong Kong would enact Article 23, a controversial provision of the Basic Law relating to national security legislation. On 8 November, hundreds of lawyers joined a silent march against Beijing's interpretation of the Basic Law, claiming it harms judicial independence. Mainland legal scholar and Hong Kong adviser Jiang Shigong responded to criticism of the interpretation by lawyers in Hong Kong by invoking the doctrine of necessity in common law.

=== First wave of disqualifications ===
On 15 November 2016, Justice Thomas Au Hing-cheung, Justice of the High Court ruled that the two Youngspiration legislators should lose their seats as their conduct during 12 October oath-taking meant they had declined to take their oaths. The judge also ruled that Legislative Council President Andrew Leung had no power to arrange a second oath-taking for the pair, adding that he had made his conclusions independently of the NPCSC interpretation.

On 30 November 2016, the Court of Appeal (Cheung CJHC, Lam VP, and Poon JA) unanimously rejected the appeals by the duo, referring to Beijing's interpretation as giving the "true meaning" to the part of the Basic Law. Chief Judge Andrew Cheung held that:

"The interpretation specifically sets out the consequence of an oath taker's declining to take the relevant oath – automatic disqualification, as part of the true meaning of Article 104 [...] The principle of nonintervention cannot prevent the court from adjudicating on the consequence of a failure to meet the constitutional requirement [...] There can be no dispute that both Leung and Yau have declined respectively to take the [Legislative Council] Oath. What has been done was done deliberately and intentionally [...] As a matter of law and fact, Leung and Yau have failed the constitutional requirement. They are caught by paragraph 2(3) of the Interpretation as well as section 21 of the Ordinance which gives effect to the constitutional requirement. Under the former, they were automatically disqualified forthwith from assuming their offices. Under the latter, they "shall ... vacate [their respective offices]." There is therefore no question of allowing them to retake the LegCo Oath."

The interpretation also affected several other judicial reviews subsequently filed by supporters of the pro-Beijing camp targeting about a dozen legislators who added words to the prescribed oath to make a political statement. Judicial reviews targeting pro-Beijing legislators were also filed, namely LegCo President Andrew Leung, Regina Ip and Lo Wai-kwok who once pledged allegiance to the United Kingdom and the Queen as a British national or colonial government official during British rule over Hong Kong. Pro-democrats Chan Chi-chuen of People Power, Leung Kwok-hung of the League of Social Democrats, Cheng Chung-tai of Civic Passion, nonpartisans Shiu Ka-chun, Yiu Chung-yim, Lau Siu-lai and Eddie Chu, Demosistō's Nathan Law, Democrats Andrew Wan, Lam Cheuk-ting, Helena Wong, and Roy Kwong, and the Labour Party's Fernando Cheung also faced judicial reviews.

On 25 August 2017, Chief Justice Geoffrey Ma and permanent judges Robert Ribeiro and Joseph Fok of the Court of Final Appeal rejected a final bid by Sixtus Leung and Yau Wai-ching.

=== Second wave of disqualifications ===
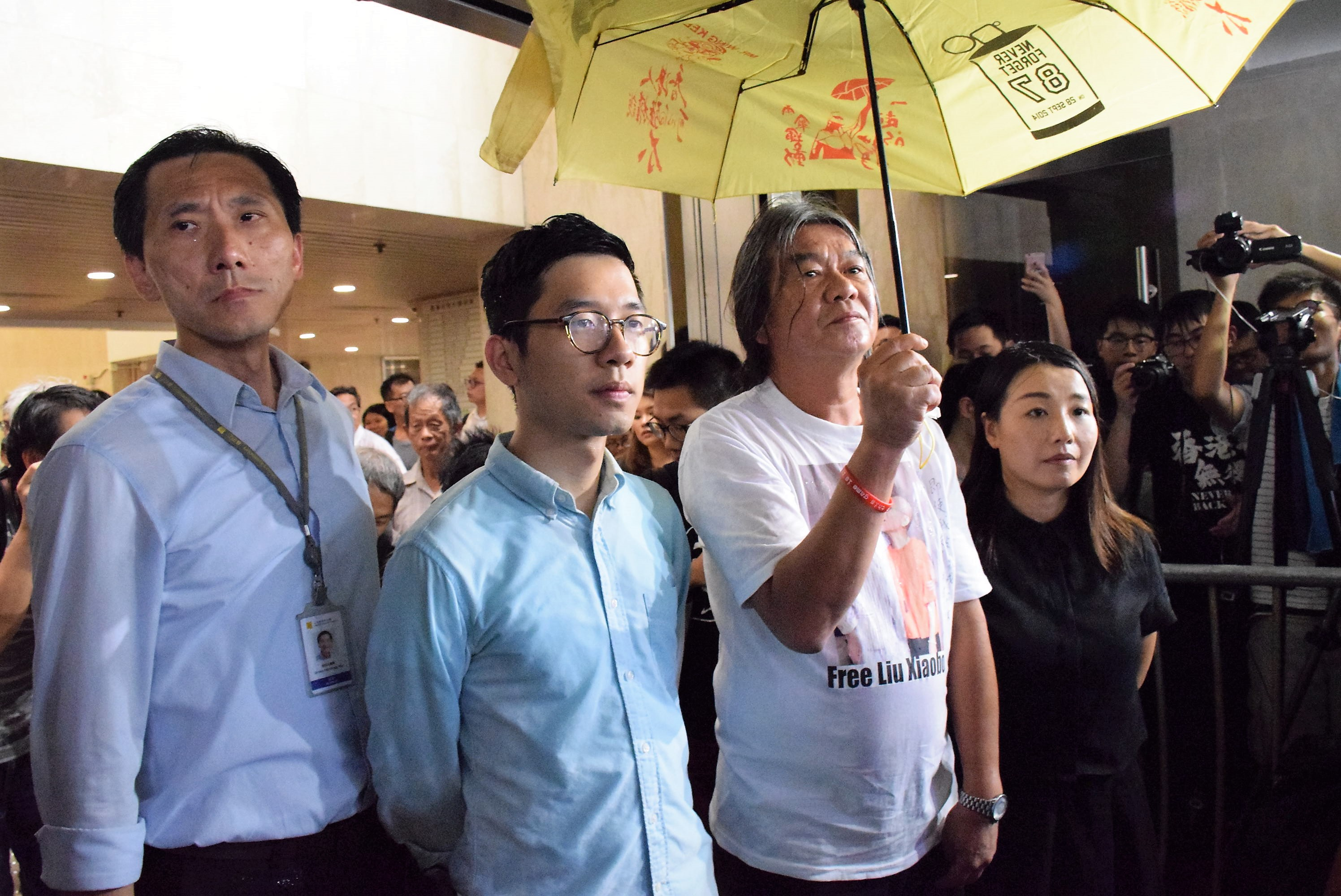
Four unseated pro-democracy legislators after hearing the ruling.

On 2 December 2016 Chief Executive Leung Chun-ying and the Secretary for Justice Rimsky Yuen lodged another judicial review against four more pro-democracy legislators over their oaths, Lau Siu-lai, Nathan Law, Leung Kwok-hung and Yiu Chung-yim, who were already under legal challenge filed by pro-Beijing supporters.

On 14 July 2017, the court ruled the four pro-democracy legislators were to lose their seats. Judge Thomas Au found that the oaths of Leung, Law and Yiu were invalid as they added statements before and after the oaths and for Lau, she took such long pauses between the words that the oath lost its meaning. Au also said "politics and political arguments" did not feature in his decision. Law's party, Demosistō issued a statement saying that with a total of six legislators ejected to date, "more than 180,000 voters had their voices silenced." The pro-democracy camp also lost its majority in the geographical constituencies as a result, dropping from 17 to 14 seats out of 35 seats, and lost the power to block pro-Beijing legislators' motions and bill amendments, including amendments to rule of procedures to block radical democrats' filibustering.

In March 2017, Lo King-yeung, a Lai King resident mounted legal action against two more legislators, Cheng Chung-tai of the Civic Passion and Eddie Chu who had also added words to their oaths. As Lo failed to promptly pay a deposit to start the case on time, High Court Judge Thomas Au Hing-cheung refused to let him make the late payment on 31 July, meaning the lawsuit could not proceed. It also marked the end of the all lawsuits relating to the oath-taking controversy.

== Councillor oath with suspected violations ==
| Name (Party) | Constituency | Contents changed in oath taking process | Valid oath? (Reason, if applicable) | Disqualified? | Being challenged in judicial review? (Government or Public or Both, if applicable) |
|---|---|---|---|---|---|
| Sixtus Leung (Youngspiration) | New Territories East | Self made oath in first time, (Note: I, Sixtus Leung, Would like to declare that. As a member of the LegCo, I shall pay earnest efforts in keeping guard over the interest of the Hong Kong nation) pronounced China as "Shina" in the second time | ✗ (Displayed a banner wrote "Hong Kong Is Not China") | ✓ | ✓ (Government) |
| Yau Wai-ching (Youngspiration) | Kowloon West | Self made oath in first time, (Note: I, Yau Wai Ching, do solemnly swear that. I will be faithful and bear true allegiance to the Hong Kong nation. And will do the best of my ability, preserve, protect and defend the values of Hong Kong.) pronounced China as "Shina" and added an expletive to "People's Republic" | ✗ (Displayed a banner wrote "Hong Kong Is Not China") | ✓ | ✓ (Government) |
| Yiu Chung-yim | Architectural, Surveying, Planning and Landscape | Added unrelated words (Note: I will protect the justice system in Hong Kong, fight for true democracy, and serve Hong Kong for its sustainable development. (Chinese: 定當守護香港制度公義，爭取真普選，為香港的可持續發展服務。)) for two times | ✗ (Invalidated by the Clerk of LegCo) → ✓ (Retake oath at second meeting)→ ✗ (Court ruling) | ✓ | ✓ (Both) |
| Lau Siu-lai | Kowloon West | Self made introduction, (Note: I, Lau Siu Lai, hereby make this pledge, that I, having entered the Council from the streets, will certainly carry forth the spirit of self-determination of destiny in the Umbrella Movement, walk with the Hong Kong people, connect the inside and outside of the Council, to fight against totalitarianism. We must live in truth, break the indifference and cynicism, look for hope in the darkness and blaze a trail to democratic self-determination together. Tear down the high wall [for] self-determination and self-reliance. (Chinese:本人劉小麗謹此承諾，本人由街頭進入議會，定必秉承雨傘運動命運自主精神，與香港人同行，連結議會內外，對抗極權。我們要活在真誠磊落之中，打破冷漠犬儒，在黑暗中尋找希望，共同開創民主自決之路。推倒高牆，自決自強。)) then read out the oath slowly, conclude speech after oath (Note: Fight for universal retirement protection, implement policy for bazaar and staunchly defend the dignity of Hong Kong people in their living. (Chinese:爭取全民退休保障，落實墟市政策，捍衛香港人生活尊嚴)) | ✗ (Invalidated by the President of LegCo)→ ✓ (Retake oath at fourth meeting)→ ✗ (Court ruling) | ✓ | ✓ (Both) |
| Leung Kwok-hung (LSD) | New Territories East | Slogans before (Note: Umbrella Movement! Indomitable! Civil Disobedience! Without Fear! Self-Autonomy and Self-Determination for People! No Approval from the Communist Party of China is Required! I Want Dual Universal Suffrage! Leung Chun Ying Step Down! (Chinese:雨傘運動！不屈不撓！公民抗命！無畏無懼！人民自主自決！無須中共批准！我要雙普選！梁振英下台！)) and after the oath, (Note: Revoke NPC 831 Decision! Revoke NPC 831 Decision! I Want Dual Universal Suffrage! Self-Autonomy and Self-Determination for People! No Approval from the Communist Party of China is Required! (Chinese:撤銷人大831決議！撤銷人大831決議！我要雙普選！人民自主自決！無須中共批准！)) tore up the prop of "831 bill" | ✓ (By the Clerk of LegCo)→ ✗ (Court ruling) | ✓ | ✓ (Both) |
| Nathan Law (Demosistō) | Hong Kong Island | Introduction speech before oath (Note: Affirmation, English being “affirmation”, has the original meaning in Latin of rendering it more assertive or strengthened. Taking the oath is a solemn ceremony, requiring us to make a pledge to Hong Kong people that we will keep our words and actions as one, to staunchly protect the rights of Hong Kong people. However, this sacred ceremony has today been reduced to a political tool used by those in power to forcefully subject representatives of people’s will to the system and the totalitarian authority. You can chain me, you can torture me, you can even destroy this body, but you will never imprison my mind. Today I must complete the necessary procedure, but this does not mean I am subjugating myself under the totalitarian authority. Hong Kong citizens will forever be the ones whom we serve and unite, I will absolutely not bear allegiance to a political administration which brutally killed its people, I will maintain my principles, and protect Hong Kong people with my conscience. Hope is in the people, change is in resistance. (Chinese:誓詞，英文係‘Affirmation’，佢拉丁文原意係使其更堅定更堅強。宣誓就係一個莊嚴嘅儀式，要我地向香港人承諾未來要知行合一，捍衛香港人嘅權利。但今日呢個神聖嘅儀式，已經淪為政權嘅工具，強行令民意代表屈服喺制度同埋極權之下。You can chain me, you can torture me, you can even destroy this body, but you will never imprison my mind. 我今日要完成必要嘅程序，但係唔代表我會屈服喺極權之下。香港市民永遠都係我地服務同埋團結嘅對象，我係絕對唔會效忠於殘殺人民嘅政權，我一定會堅持原則，用良知守護香港。希望在於人民，改變始於抗爭。)) and slogan after oath, (Note: Power returns to the people, tyranny will fell, democratic self determination, fight till the end. (Chinese:權力歸於人民, 暴政必亡, 民主自決, 抗爭到底)) pronounce the oath in questioning style | ✓ (By the President of LegCo)→ ✗ (Court ruling) | ✓ | ✓ (Both) |
| Chan Chi-chuen (People Power) | New Territories East | Introduction speech (Note: The Government has issued this statement about the oath taking of councillors. Oath taking is LegCo’s business, and it mustn’t be intervened by the government! (Chinese:政府尋日就著立法會議員宣誓發表左咁的聲明。議員宣誓係立法會的事務；立法會事務不容政府干預！)) and using props (Note: A printed copy of government statement on LegCo councillor’s oath taking) before oath, slogans after the oath (Note: I am Hong Kong people, I want real universal suffrage. Against evil laws by filibuster, fight for people's living, CY Leung step down! (Chinese:我係香港人, 我要真普選, 拉布抗惡法, 抗爭為民生, 梁振英下台!)) | ✓ | ✗ | ✓ (Public) |
| Shiu Ka-chun | Social Welfare | Using props (Note: A percussion instrument used by Shiu during the Occupy Central, Shiu hit it six times) and shouting slogans (Note: Umbrella Movement, failed but not ruined, continue strengthens, we are back! (Chinese:雨傘運動，敗而不潰，繼續頑強，We are back！)) after oath | ✓ | ✗ | ✓ (Public) |
| Eddie Chu | New Territories West | Shouted slogan after oath (Note: Democratic self determination, tyranny will fell! I oppose Andrew Leung to be the LegCo President! (Chinese: 民主自決，暴政必亡！反對梁君彥做主席！)) | ✓ | ✗ | ✓ (Public) |
| Cheng Chung-tai (Civic Passion) | New Territories West | Introduction speech before oath, (Note: Fellow Hong Kong people, in these past years of struggle movements, we've paid all we have to go on the streets for about 70 days. Even in the incident on the first lunar new year day, many youths sacrificed their future for Hong Kong. Thus, for today's oath taking, I don't think that it will bring such effects of struggling, I believed that all of you will know. (Chinese:各位香港人, 係過去幾年的抗爭運動, 為左香港的未來, 已經不惜走上街頭七十幾日;甚至係年初一的事件, 好多年輕人為左自己的香港犧牲未來。所以我唔認為我今日宣誓的形式會構成具體抗爭的效果; 我相信大家會明白。)) slogan after oath (Note: A constitution for people to draft, remake the covenant, Hong Kong people be the most prioritized, long live Hong Kong! (Chinese:全民制憲, 重新立約, 港人為大, 香港萬歲!)) | ✓ | ✗ | ✓ (Public) |
| Fernando Cheung (Labour) | New Territories East | Tore up the "831 bill" after the oath | ✓ | ✗ | ✗ |
| Lam Cheuk-ting (Democratic) | New Territories East | Slogan after oath (Note: Strike on corruption! Wolf CY Leung step down! (Chinese: 打擊貪腐！狼英下台！)) | ✓ | ✗ | ✗ |
| Helena Wong (Democratic) | Kowloon West | Slogan after oath (Note: Revoke 831, restart political reform, CY Leung step down! No delay for examine the water by Water Supplies Department! (Chinese: 撤回831，重啓政改，梁振英下台！水務署立即驗水，冇得拖！)) | ✓ | ✗ | ✗ |
| Kwong Chun-yu (Democratic) | District Council (Second) | Conclude speech after oath (Note: Hong Kong, is the main stage of Hong Kong people. Lest we forget our aims at the beginning, I want true universal suffrage, cheer up Hong Kong people! (Chinese:香港, 係香港人的主場, 勿忘初衷, 我要真普選, 香港人加油!)) | ✓ | ✗ | ✗ |
| Wong Ting-kwong (DAB) | Import and Export | Words omitted | ✗ (Invalidated by LegCo President, on Wong's request)→ ✓ (Retake oath at second meeting) | ✗ | ✗ |

== Indirectly caused disputes in the 2016 Macau Legislative Council Election Law ==
The new election rules stipulate that candidates should not carry out activities that could influence voters in the two-month period between their registration and the start of the campaign period on August 31. Commercial advertising is barred from most public areas, except those specially designated by the government.

After an interpretation of the Basic Law, the Macau EAC carried out a new election measure to require that all candidates sign an additional "confirmation form" in their nomination of their understanding of the Basic Law of Macau.

== See also ==
- 2016 Mong Kok civil unrest
- 6th Legislative Council of Hong Kong
- Charles Bradlaugh
- 2018 Hong Kong by-election
- Hong Kong independence
- Hong Kong LegCo candidates' disqualification controversy
- 2016 Hong Kong legislative election
- Localism in Hong Kong
