= Hong Kong Institute of Surveyors =

The Hong Kong Institute of Surveyors
- Traditional Chinese: 香港測量師學會
- Simplified Chinese: 香港测量师学会
Transcriptions
Standard Mandarin
- Hanyu Pinyin: Xiānggǎng Cèliángshī Xuéhuì
Yue: Cantonese
- Jyutping: hoeng1 gong2 cak1 loeng4 si1 hok6 wui6*2

The Hong Kong Institute of Surveyors (HKIS; Chinese: 香港測量師學會) is a surveying organisation in Hong Kong.

It was formally established in April 1984 with 85 founding members. It is the only professional surveying body incorporated by ordinance in Hong Kong. As of February 2017, membership exceeds 9,776, with more than 6,288 corporate members. The first president of the institute was Sr Kan Fook-Yee (簡福飴; 简福饴; gaan2 fuk1 ji4; Jiǎn Fúyí).

Members holding HKIS qualifications may use the following designations after their name: MHKIS (Member), FHKIS (Fellow), AMHKIS (Associate Member). Those with the designation MHKIS or FHKIS are also known as professional surveyors.

== History ==
Sr Kan Fook-Yee and a number of his colleagues saw the value of a professional body for local surveyors, and the need to stimulate the development of the industry.

Prior to the establishment of the HKIS in 1984, the Britain-based Royal Institution of Chartered Surveyors (RICS) represented the industry in Hong Kong.

The Institute was statutorily incorporated by virtue of the Hong Kong Institute of Surveyors Ordinance in January 1990 (Cap. 1148). In July 1991, the Surveyors Registration Ordinance (Cap. 417) was passed and a Registration Board was set up to administer the registration of surveyors.

The Hong Kong Institute of Surveyors Ordinance of 1990 incorporated the HKIS.

The head office was previously at Swire House (now Chater House) in Central, but it later moved to the Jardine House in Central in 1998.

In 2014 the HKIS stated that the Hong Kong government ought to establish an authority that oversees renovations of older buildings to prevent corruption and wrongful conduct.

A member of either the HKIS or the RCIS may join the other organization after one year of working in Hong Kong.

== Organisation ==
The General Council governs the Hong Kong Institute of Surveyors and oversees the functions and activities of the Divisions, Young Surveyors Group, Board of Membership, Board of Education, Board of Professional Development, Surveyors Times Editorial Board, Surveying and Built Environment Editorial Board, and the appointed Committees including the Executive Committee and Standing Committees. The General Council and all boards and divisions are operated by volunteers from the profession and are supported by the HKIS Secretariat.

The HKIS has six divisions by reference to respective professional practices; they are:

- Building Surveying
- General Practice
- Land Surveying
- Quantity Surveying
- Planning and Development
- Property and Facility Management
