= 1st Legislative Council of Hong Kong =

1998–2000 Legislative Council of Hong Kong

←	Provisional Legislative Council	2nd Legislative Council	→
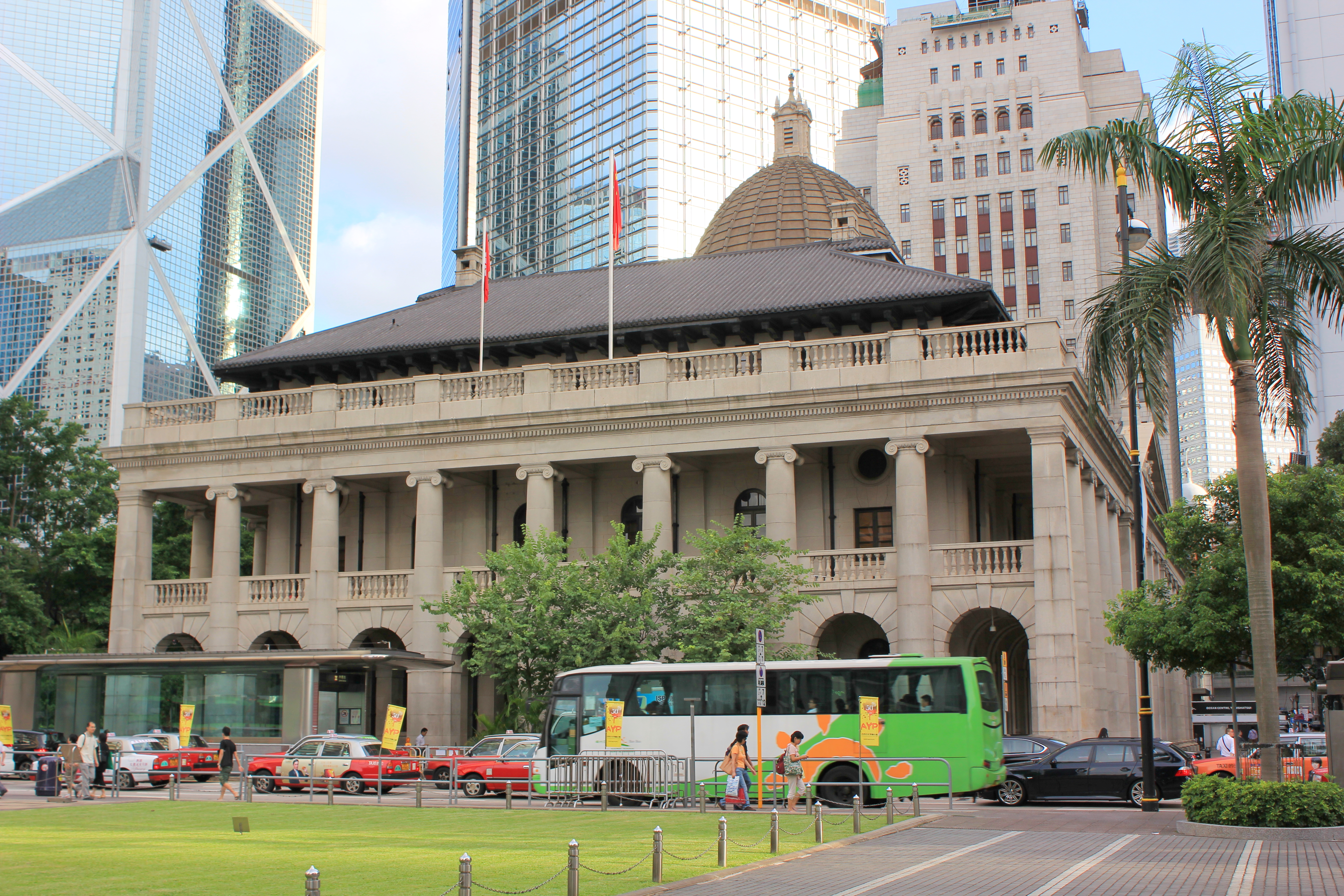

Overview
- Legislative body: Legislative Council
- Jurisdiction: Hong Kong
- Meeting place: Legislative Council Building
- Term: 1 July 1998 – 30 June 2000
- Website: legco.gov.hk/
- Members: 60 members
- President: Rita Fan (Independent)
- Party control: Pro-Beijing camp

The First Legislative Council of Hong Kong was the first meeting of the legislative branch of the HKSAR government after the handover of Hong Kong, replacing the Provisional Legislative Council existing between 1997 and 1998. The membership of the LegCo is based on the 1998 election. It had the shortest term of the session was from 1 July 1998 to 30 June 2000, only two years unlike the latter legislative session of four years. The legislature was held during the first term of the Tung Chee-hwa's administration. The pro-democracy camp who did not participate in the Provisional Legislative Council held 20 seats with Democratic Party being the largest party. Notable newcomers to the Legislative Council included Cyd Ho, Bernard Chan, Lui Ming-wah, and Wong Yung-kan.

== Major events ==
- 12 December 1999: The Legislative Council passed the controversial Provision of Municipal Services (Reorganization) Bill to repeal the two provisional municipal councils, the Urban Council and Regional Council.

== Major legislation ==
=== Enacted ===
- 12 December 1999: Provision of Municipal Services (Reorganization) Bill

== Composition ==
Affiliation	Election	At dissolution
Liberal Party	10	10
Democratic Alliance for the Betterment of Hong Kong (DAB)	9	10
Hong Kong Progressive Alliance	5	6
Breakfast Group	5	5
New Century Forum	0	2
Federation of Hong Kong and Kowloon Labour Unions (FLU)	1	1
Hong Kong Federation of Trade Unions (FTU)	1	0
Pro-Beijing Independent	9	5
Total for Pro-Beijing camp	40	39
Democratic Party	13	12
The Frontier	3	3
Citizens Party	1	1
Neighbourhood and Worker's Service Centre (NWSC)	1	1
Hong Kong Confederation of Trade Unions (CTU)	0	1
Independent Democrat	2	2
Total for Pro-democracy camp	20	20
Total	60	59
Vacant	0	1

== Graphical representation of the Legislative Council ==

- Vacant seat

Pro-democracy camp:

- NSWC
- Frontier
- Citizens Party
- CTU
- Democratic Party
- Independents

Pro-Beijing camp:

- Liberal Party
- New Forum
- Progressive Alliance
- DAB
- FLU
- Independents

== Leadership ==
Office	Party	Officer	Constituency	Since
President	Independent	Rita Fan Hsu Lai-tai	Election Committee	1998

== List of members ==
The following table is a list of LegCo members elected on 24 May 1998 in the order of precedence.

Members who did not serve throughout the term are italicised. New members elected since the general election are noted at the bottom of the page.

Key to changes since legislative election:

^{a} = change in party allegiance
^{b} = by-election
^{c} = other change

Selection Method	Constituency	Portrait	Elected Members	Elected Party	Political Alignment	Born	Occupation(s)
EC	Election Committee		Rita Fan	Independent	Pro-Beijing	20 September 1945	Legislative Councillor
FC	Industrial (First)		Kenneth Ting	Liberal	Pro-Beijing	21 August 1942	Company Chairman
FC	Commercial (First)		James Tien	Liberal	Pro-Beijing	8 January 1947	Company Chairman
EC	Election Committee		David Chu	Progressive Alliance	Pro-Beijing	5 March 1943	Company Chairman; Company Director
EC	Election Committee		Ho Sai-chu	Liberal	Pro-Beijing	6 June 1937	Director and General Manager
GC	New Territories East		Cyd Ho	Frontier	Pro-democracy	24 July 1954	Social Activist
FC	Architectural, Surveying and Planning		Edward Ho	Liberal	Pro-Beijing	2 December 1938	Managing Director
GC	New Territories West		Albert Ho	Democratic	Pro-democracy	1 December 1951	Solicitor and Notary Public; Legislative Councillor
FC	Health Services		Michael Ho	Democratic	Pro-democracy	6 November 1955	Registered Nurse
FC	Engineering		Raymond Ho	Breakfast Group	Pro-Beijing	23 March 1939	Engineer
GC	New Territories West		Lee Wing-tat	Democratic	Pro-democracy	25 December 1955	Lecturer
GC	New Territories West		Lee Cheuk-yan	Frontier^{a}	Pro-democracy	12 February 1957	Legislative Councillor
GC	Hong Kong Island		Martin Lee	Democratic	Pro-democracy	8 June 1938	Barrister-at-law
FC	Accountancy		Eric Li	Breakfast Group	Pro-Beijing	23 May 1953	Accountant
FC	Labour		Lee Kai-ming	FLU	Pro-Beijing	11 October 1937	Legislative Councillor
FC	Finance		David Li	Independent	Pro-Beijing	13 March 1939	Banker
GC	Kowloon East		Fred Li	Democratic	Pro-democracy	25 April 1955	Legislative Councillor
FC	Industrial (Second)		Lui Ming-wah	Independent	Pro-Beijing	4 April 1937	Businessman
EC	Election Committee		Ng Leung-sing	Breakfast Group	Pro-Beijing	11 July 1949	Banker
EC	Election Committee		Ng Ching-fai	Independent^{a}	Pro-Beijing	20 November 1939	Dean and Chair Professor
FC	Legal		Margaret Ng	Independent	Pro-democracy	25 January 1948	Barrister-at-law
FC	Wholesale and Retail		Selina Chow	Liberal	Pro-Beijing	25 January 1945	Legislative Councillor
FC	Real Estate and Construction		Ronald Arculli	Liberal	Pro-Beijing	2 January 1939	Solicitor
EC	Election Committee		Ma Fung-kwok	Independent^{a}	Pro-Beijing	22 July 1955	Managing Director
GC	Kowloon West		James To	Democratic	Pro-democracy	11 March 1963	Solicitor
FC	Education		Cheung Man-kwong	Democratic/PTU	Pro-democracy	15 September 1954	Teacher; Legislative Councillor
FC	Urban Council		Ambrose Cheung^{c}	Independent	Pro-Beijing	10 January 1951	Lawyer; Company Director
FC	Import and Export		Hui Cheung-ching	Progressive Alliance	Pro-Beijing	4 September 1942	Company Director
GC	Hong Kong Island		Christine Loh	Citizens	Pro-democracy	1 February 1956	Politician
FC	Labour		Chan Kwok-keung	FTU^{a}	Pro-Beijing	17 January 1946	Associate Director
GC	Kowloon East		Chan Yuen-han	DAB	Pro-Beijing	15 November 1946	Labour Service
FC	Insurance		Bernard Chan	Breakfast Group	Pro-Beijing	11 January 1965	Company President
FC	Labour		Chan Wing-chan	DAB	Pro-Beijing	7 July 1935	Legislative Councillor
GC	Kowloon East		Chan Kam-lam	DAB	Pro-Beijing	22 January 1949	Legislative Councillor
FC	Medical		Leong Che-hung	Breakfast Group	Pro-Beijing	23 April 1939	Medical Doctor
FC	Textiles and Garment		Sophie Leung	Liberal	Pro-Beijing	9 October 1945	Company Director
GC	New Territories West		Leung Yiu-chung	NWSC	Pro-democracy	19 May 1953	Legislative Councillor
GC	Hong Kong Island		Gary Cheng	DAB	Pro-Beijing	29 May 1950	Public Relations Consultant
FC	Information Technology		Sin Chung-kai	Democratic	Pro-democracy	15 June 1960	Legislative Councillor
GC	New Territories East		Andrew Wong	Independent	Pro-democracy	11 December 1943	Professor
FC	Commercial (Second)		Philip Wong	Independent	Pro-Beijing	23 December 1938	Company Chairman
FC	Agriculture and Fisheries		Wong Yung-kan	DAB	Pro-Beijing	10 August 1951	Legislative Councillor
GC	Kowloon West		Jasper Tsang	DAB	Pro-Beijing	14 May 1947	Legislative Councillor
FC	Tourism		Howard Young	Liberal	Pro-Beijing	30 March 1948	General Manager
GC	Hong Kong Island		Yeung Sum	Democratic	Pro-democracy	22 November 1947	Lecturer
EC	Election Committee		Yeung Yiu-chung	DAB	Pro-Beijing	7 November 1951	School Principal
FC	Financial Services^{b}		Chim Pui-chung	Independent	Pro-Beijing	24 September 1946	Company Director
GC	Kowloon West		Lau Chin-shek	Democratic^{a}	Pro-democracy	12 September 1944	Legislative Councillor
GC	New Territories East		Lau Kong-wah	DAB	Pro-Beijing	22 June 1957	Legislative Councillor
FC	Heung Yee Kuk		Lau Wong-fat	Liberal	Pro-Beijing	15 October 1936	Company Chairman
FC	Transport		Miriam Lau	Liberal	Pro-Beijing	27 April 1947	Solicitor and Notary Public
EC	Election Committee		Ambrose Lau	Progressive Alliance	Pro-Beijing	16 July 1947	Solicitor and Notary Public
GC	New Territories East		Emily Lau	Frontier	Pro-democracy	22 January 1952	Legislative Councillor
FC	Regional Council^{b}		Tang Siu-tong	Progressive Alliance	Pro-Beijing	26 September 1942	Medical Practitioner
EC	Election Committee		Choy So-yuk	Progressive Alliance	Pro-Beijing	10 October 1950	Merchant
GC	New Territories East		Andrew Cheng	Democratic	Pro-democracy	28 April 1960	Solicitor
GC	Kowloon East		Szeto Wah	Democratic	Pro-democracy	28 February 1931	Legislative Councillor
FC	Sports, Performing Arts, Culture and Publication		Timothy Fok	Independent	Pro-Beijing	14 February 1946	Merchant
FC	Social Welfare		Law Chi-kwong	Democratic	Pro-democracy	1 November 1953	Social Work Teacher
GC	New Territories West		Tam Yiu-chung	DAB	Pro-Beijing	15 December 1949	Legislative Councillor

== By-elections ==
- 29 October 1998, a by-election was held for Regional Council constituency after some votes were found problematic. Tang Siu-tong won again in the by-election.
- 5 November 1998, Fung Chi-kin replaced Chim Pui-chung in the Financial Services by-election after Chim was found conspiring to forge documents in 1998, whereupon he was impeached and disqualified as a legislator by Legco.

== Other changes ==
=== 1999 ===
- Ma Fung-kwok and Ng Ching-fai (Election Committee) co-founded the New Century Forum on 23 June 1999.

=== 2000 ===
- Ambrose Cheung (Urban Council) representing the Provisional Urban Council resigned from the Legislative Council as protest to the government's decision on abolishing the two municipal councils, Urban Council and Regional Council with effect from 1 January 2000.
- Lau Chin-shek (Kowloon West) was expelled from the Democratic Party in May 2000 because of having dual membership of both Democratic Party and The Frontier.

== Committees ==
Committee	Chair		Vice Chair	
Committee	1998–1999	1999–2000	1998–1999	1999–2000
Committees
Finance Committee: Establishment Subcommittee; Public Works Subcommittee	Ronald Arculli (Liberal)		Chan Kam-lam (DAB)	
Finance Committee: Establishment Subcommittee; Public Works Subcommittee	Philip Wong (Independent)		Ng Leung-sing (Breakfast)	
Finance Committee: Establishment Subcommittee; Public Works Subcommittee	Ho Sai-chu (Liberal)		Raymond Ho (Breakfast)	
Public Accounts Committee	Eric Li (Breakfast)		Fred Li (Democratic)	
Committee on Members' Interests	David Chu (PA)		Sin Chung-kai (Democratic)	
House Committee: Parliamentary Liaison Subcommittee	Leong Che-hung (Breakfast)		Yeung Sum (Democratic)	
House Committee: Parliamentary Liaison Subcommittee	Edward Ho (Liberal)		Emily Lau (Frontier)	
Committee on Rules of Procedure	Selina Chow (Liberal)		Margaret Ng (Independent)	
Panels
Panel on Administration of Justice and Legal Services	Margaret Ng (Independent)		Jasper Tsang (DAB)	
Panel on Commerce and Industry	Chan Kam-lam (DAB)		Lui Ming-wah (Ind.)	Kenneth Ting (Liberal)
Panel on Constitutional Affairs	Andrew Wong (Independent)		Emily Lau (Frontier)	
Panel on Economic Services	James Tien (Liberal)		Fred Li (Democratic)	
Panel on Education	Yeung Yiu-chung (DAB)		Ng Ching-fai (Independent→NCF)	
Panel on Environmental Affairs	Christine Loh (Citizens)		Hui Cheung-ching (PA)	
Panel on Financial Affairs	Ambrose Lau (PA)		Eric Li (Breakfast)	
Panel on Health Services	Michael Ho (Democratic)		Leong Che-hung (Breakfast)	
Panel on Home Affairs	Choy So-yuk (PA)		Albert Ho (Democratic)	
Panel on Housing	Lee Wing-tat (Democratic)		Gary Cheng (DAB)	
Panel on Information Technology and Broadcasting	Sin Chung-kai (Democratic)	Ma Fung-kwok (Independent→NCF)	Ma Fung-kwok (Independent→NCF)	Sin Chung-kai (Democratic)
Panel on Manpower	Fred Li (Democratic)	Lau Chin-shek (Democratic→CTU)	Lau Chin-shek (Democratic)	Lee Kai-ming (FLU)
Panel on Planning, Lands and Works	Edward Ho (Liberal)		Tang Siu-tong (PA)	
Panel on Public Service	Tam Yiu-chung (DAB)		Sophie Leung (Liberal)	
Panel on Security	James To (Democratic)		Selina Chow (Liberal)	
Panel on Transport	Miriam Lau (Liberal)		Lau Kong-wah (DAB)	
Panel on Welfare Services	Chan Yuen-han (DAB)		Ho Sai-chu (Liberal)	

== See also ==
- 1998 Hong Kong legislative election
