= 2nd Legislative Council of Hong Kong =

2000–2004 Legislative Council of Hong Kong

←	1st Legislative Council	3rd Legislative Council	→
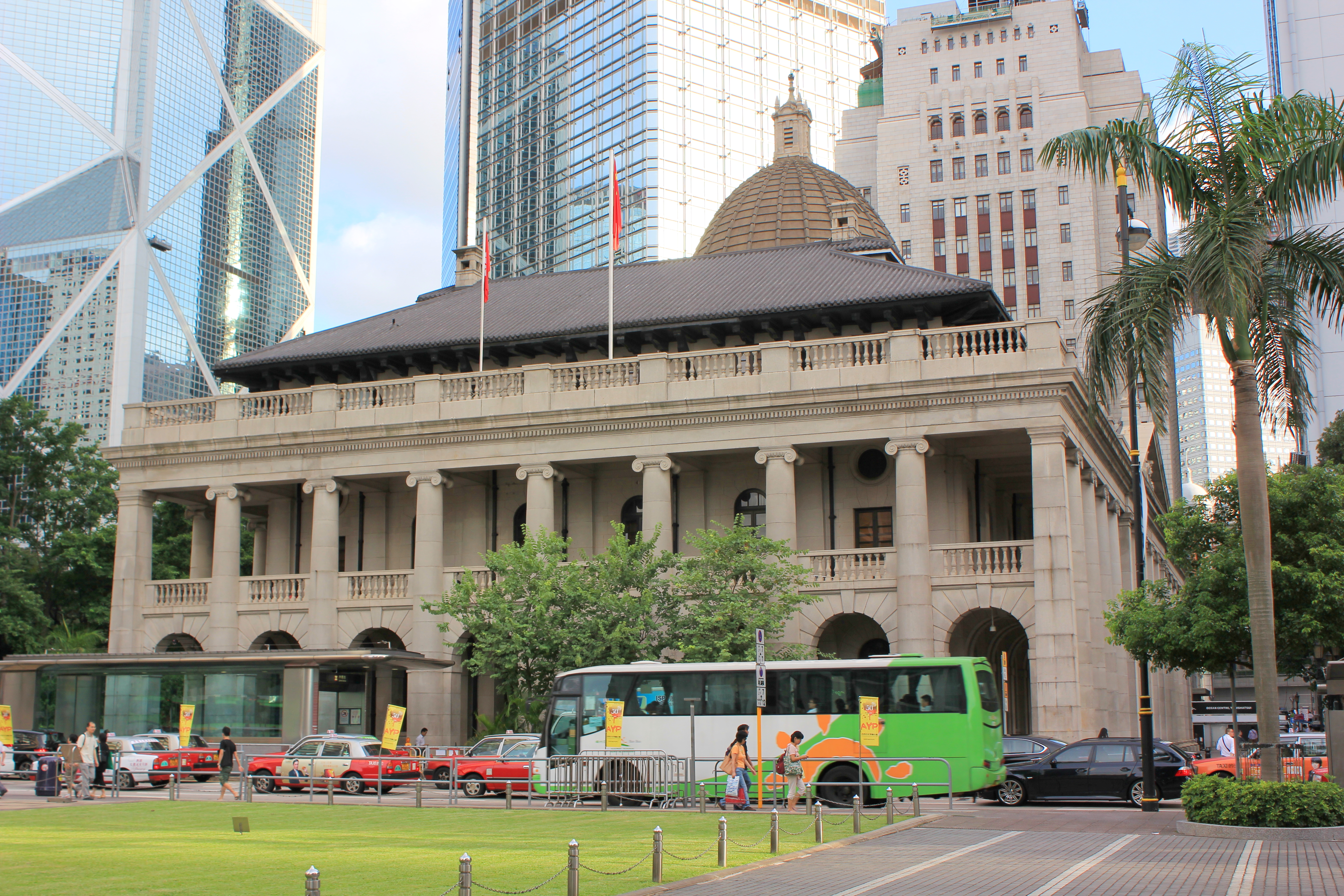

Overview
- Legislative body: Legislative Council
- Jurisdiction: Hong Kong
- Meeting place: Legislative Council Building
- Term: 1 October 2000 – 30 September 2004
- Website: legco.gov.hk/
- Members: 60 members
- President: Rita Fan (Independent)
- Party control: Pro-Beijing camp

The Second Legislative Council of Hong Kong (Chinese: 香港第二屆立法會) was the meeting of the legislative branch of the Hong Kong Special Administrative Region Government. The membership of the LegCo is based on the 2000 election. The term of the session was from 1 October 2000 to 30 September 2004, during the latter half of the first term of the Tung Chee-hwa's administration and most of the Tung's second term in office. The pro-democratic Democratic Party remained the largest party with 13 seats. Notable newcomers to the Legislative Council included Wong Sing-chi, Michael Mak, Li Fung-ying, Lo Wing-lok, Abraham Shek, Tommy Cheung and Audrey Eu who won the seat vacated by Gary Cheng in the 2000 Hong Kong Island by-election.

== Major events ==
- September 2002 – July 2003: The government released its proposals for the anti-subversion law and sparked enormous criticisms from the society. The Hong Kong 1 July marches recorded more than five millions, the largest protest since the Tiananmen Square protests of 1989. Liberal Party's chairman James Tien resigned from the Executive Council and would have party members vote for a postponement. As a result, the government withdrew the bill in later July due to insufficient votes to pass the law.

== Major legislation ==
=== Enacted ===
- 8 July 2004: Education (Amendment) Ordinance 2004

=== Proposed ===
- National Security (Legislative Provisions) Bill

=== National Security (Legislative Provisions) Bill ===
In November 2002, the anti-subversion National Security (Legislative Provisions) Bill to amend the Crimes Ordinance, the Official Secrets Ordinance and the Societies Ordinance pursuant to the obligation imposed by Article 23 of the Basic Law of the Hong Kong was introduced to the Legislative Council. It is the cause of considerable controversy and division in Hong Kong. Protests against the bill resulted in a massive demonstration on 1 July 2003. In the aftermath, the National Security (Legislative Provisions) Bill was withdrawn after it became clear that it would not get the necessary support from the Legislative Council for it to be passed. The bill was then shelved indefinitely.

== Composition ==
Affiliation	Election	At dissolution
Democratic Alliance for the Betterment of Hong Kong	11	10
Liberal Party	8	8
Breakfast Group	7	7
Hong Kong Progressive Alliance	4	4
Hong Kong Federation of Trade Unions	1	1
Federation of Hong Kong and Kowloon Labour Unions	1	1
New Century Forum	1	1
Independent	6	6
Total for Pro-Beijing camp	39	38
Democratic Party	12	11
Hong Kong Confederation of Trade Unions	2	2
The Frontier	2	2
Article 45 Concern Group	0	2
Hong Kong Association for Democracy and People's Livelihood	1	1
Neighbourhood and Worker's Service Centre	1	1
Independent	3	3
Total for Pro-democracy camp	21	22
Total	60	60

== Graphical representation of the Legislative Council ==

Pro-democracy camp:

- Frontier
- CTU
- NSWC
- A45 Concern Group
- Democratic Party
- ADPL
- Independents

Pro-Beijing camp:

- Liberal Party
- New Forum
- Progressive Alliance
- DAB
- FTU
- FLU
- Independents

== Leadership ==
Office	Party	Officer	Constituency	Since
President	Independent	Rita Fan Hsu Lai-tai	Election Committee	1998

== List of members ==
The following table is a list of LegCo members elected on 10 September 2000 in the order of precedence..

Members who did not serve throughout the term are italicised. New members elected since the general election are noted at the bottom of the page.

Key to changes since legislative election:

^{a} = change in party allegiance
^{b} = by-election
^{c} = other change
^{d} = did not take seat

Selection Method	Constituency	Portrait	Elected Members	Elected Party	Political Alignment	Born	Occupation(s)	Assumed Office
EC	Election Committee		Rita Fan	Independent	Pro-Beijing	20 September 1945	Legislative Councillor	1998
FC	Industrial (First)		Kenneth Ting	Liberal	Pro-Beijing	21 August 1942	Company Chairman	1998
FC	Commercial (First)		James Tien	Liberal	Pro-Beijing	8 January 1947	Company Chairman	1998
EC	Election Committee		David Chu	Progressive Alliance	Pro-Beijing	5 March 1943	Company Chairman; Company Director	1998
GC	Hong Kong Island		Cyd Ho	Frontier	Pro-democracy	24 July 1954	Social Activist	1998
GC	New Territories West		Albert Ho	Democratic	Pro-democracy	1 December 1951	Solicitor and Notary Public; Legislative Councillor	1998
FC	Engineering		Raymond Ho	Breakfast Group	Pro-Beijing	23 March 1939	Engineer	1998
GC	New Territories West		Lee Cheuk-yan	CTU	Pro-democracy	12 February 1957	Legislative Councillor	1998
GC	Hong Kong Island		Martin Lee	Democratic	Pro-democracy	8 June 1938	Barrister-at-law	1998
FC	Accountancy		Eric Li	Breakfast Group	Pro-Beijing	23 May 1953	Accountant	1998
FC	Finance		David Li	Independent	Pro-Beijing	13 March 1939	Banker	1998
GC	Kowloon East		Fred Li	Democratic	Pro-democracy	25 April 1955	Legislative Councillor	1998
FC	Industrial (Second)		Lui Ming-wah	Breakfast Group	Pro-Beijing	4 April 1937	Businessman	1998
EC	Election Committee		Ng Leung-sing	Breakfast Group	Pro-Beijing	11 July 1949	Banker	1998
EC	Election Committee^{b}		Ng Ching-fai	New Forum	Pro-Beijing	20 November 1939	Dean and Chair Professor	1998
FC	Legal		Margaret Ng	Independent^{a}	Pro-democracy	25 January 1948	Barrister-at-law	1998
GC	Wholesale and Retail		Selina Chow	Liberal	Pro-Beijing	25 January 1945	Legislative Councillor	1998
GC	Kowloon West		James To	Democratic	Pro-democracy	11 March 1963	Solicitor	1998
FC	Education		Cheung Man-kwong	Democratic/PTU	Pro-democracy	15 September 1954	Teacher; Legislative Councillor	1998
FC	Import and Export		Hui Cheung-ching	Progressive Alliance	Pro-Beijing	4 September 1942	Company Director	1998
FC	Labour		Chan Kwok-keung	DAB	Pro-Beijing	17 January 1946	Associate Director	1998
GC	Kowloon East		Chan Yuen-han	DAB	Pro-Beijing	15 November 1946	Labour Service	1998
FC	Insurance		Bernard Chan	Breakfast Group	Pro-Beijing	11 January 1965	Company President	1998
GC	Kowloon East		Chan Kam-lam	DAB	Pro-Beijing	22 January 1949	Legislative Councillor	1998
FC	Textiles and Garment		Sophie Leung	Liberal	Pro-Beijing	9 October 1945	Company Director	1998
GC	New Territories West		Leung Yiu-chung	NWSC	Pro-democracy	19 May 1953	Legislative Councillor	1998
GC	Hong Kong Island^{b}		Gary Cheng^{d}	DAB	Pro-Beijing	29 May 1950	Public Relations Consultant	1998
FC	Information Technology		Sin Chung-kai	Democratic	Pro-democracy	15 June 1960	Legislative Councillor	1998
GC	New Territories East		Andrew Wong	Independent	Pro-democracy	11 December 1943	Professor	1998
FC	Commercial (Second)		Philip Wong	Independent	Pro-Beijing	23 December 1938	Company Chairman	1998
FC	Agriculture and Fisheries		Wong Yung-kan	DAB	Pro-Beijing	10 August 1951	Legislative Councillor	1998
GC	Kowloon West		Jasper Tsang	DAB	Pro-Beijing	14 May 1947	Legislative Councillor	1998
FC	Tourism		Howard Young	Liberal	Pro-Beijing	30 March 1948	General Manager	1998
GC	Hong Kong Island		Yeung Sum	Democratic	Pro-democracy	22 November 1947	Lecturer	1998
EC	Election Committee		Yeung Yiu-chung	DAB	Pro-Beijing	7 November 1951	School Principal	1998
GC	Kowloon West		Lau Chin-shek	CTU	Pro-democracy	12 September 1944	Legislative Councillor	1998
GC	New Territories East		Lau Kong-wah	DAB	Pro-Beijing	22 June 1957	Legislative Councillor	1998
FC	Heung Yee Kuk		Lau Wong-fat	Liberal	Pro-Beijing	15 October 1936	Company Chairman	1998
FC	Transport		Miriam Lau	Liberal	Pro-Beijing	27 April 1947	Solicitor and Notary Public	1998
EC	Election Committee		Ambrose Lau	Progressive Alliance	Pro-Beijing	16 July 1947	Solicitor and Notary Public	1998
GC	New Territories East		Emily Lau	Frontier	Pro-democracy	22 January 1952	Legislative Councillor	1998
GC	Hong Kong Island		Choy So-yuk	DAB	Pro-Beijing	10 October 1950	Merchant	1998
GC	New Territories East		Andrew Cheng	Democratic	Pro-democracy	28 April 1960	Solicitor	1998
GC	Kowloon East		Szeto Wah	Democratic	Pro-democracy	28 February 1931	Legislative Councillor	1998
FC	Sports, Performing Arts, Culture and Publication		Timothy Fok	Independent	Pro-Beijing	14 February 1946	Merchant	1998
FC	Social Welfare		Law Chi-kwong	Democratic	Pro-democracy	1 November 1953	Social Work Teacher	1998
GC	New Territories West		Tam Yiu-chung	DAB	Pro-Beijing	15 December 1949	Legislative Councillor	1998
GC	New Territories West		Tang Siu-tong	Progressive Alliance	Pro-Beijing	26 September 1942	Medical Practitioner	1998 (b)
FC	Real Estate and Construction		Abraham Shek	Breakfast Group	Pro-Beijing	24 June 1945	Company Director	2000
FC	Labour		Li Fung-ying	FLU	Pro-Beijing	2 December 1950	Trade Union Officer	2000
FC	Financial Services		Henry Wu	Independent	Pro-Beijing	23 August 1951	Merchant; Executive Director	2000
FC	Catering		Tommy Cheung	Liberal	Pro-Beijing	30 September 1949	Merchant; Legislative Councillor	2000
FC	Health Services		Michael Mak	Independent	Pro-democracy	23 August 1955	Legislative Councillor	2000
GC	New Territories West		Albert Chan	Democratic^{a}	Pro-democracy	3 March 1955	Legislative Councillor	2000
FC	Labour		Leung Fu-wah	FTU	Pro-Beijing	21 October 1951	Unionist	2000
FC	Medical		Lo Wing-lok	Breakfast Group	Pro-Beijing	13 September 1954	Medical Practitioner	2000
GC	New Territories East		Wong Sing-chi	Democratic	Pro-democracy	11 October 1957	Social Worker	2000
GC	Kowloon West		Frederick Fung	ADPL	Pro-democracy	17 March 1953	Legislative Councillor	2000
FC	District Council		Ip Kwok-him	DAB	Pro-Beijing	8 November 1951	Executive Secretary	2000
FC	Architectural, Surveying and Planning		Lau Ping-cheung	Independent	Pro-Beijing	3 October 1951	Surveyor	2000

== By-elections ==
- 10 December 2000, Audrey Eu elected in the Hong Kong Island by-election and replaced Gary Cheng who did not take the seat and was subsequently jailed for abuse of office.
- 16 September 2001, Ma Fung-kwok replaced resigned Ng Ching-fai in the Election Committee by-election.

== Other changes ==
=== 2002 ===
- Albert Chan (New Territories West) left the Democratic Party on 1 August 2002, a day after the Party's leadership election.

=== 2003 ===
- Audrey Eu (Hong Kong Island) and Margaret Ng (Legal) launched the Basic Law Article 23 Concern Group to criticise the HKSAR Government's legislative proposals to implement the controversial Article 23 of the Basic Law and renamed it into Article 45 Concern Group on 14 November 2003.

== Committees ==
Committee	Chair				Vice Chair			
Committee	2000–01	2001–02	2002–03	2003–04	2000–01	2001–02	2002–03	2003–04
Committees
Finance Committee: Establishment Subcommittee; Public Works Subcommittee	Philip Wong (Independent)				Ng Leung-sing (Breakfast)			
Finance Committee: Establishment Subcommittee; Public Works Subcommittee	Chan Kwok-keung (DAB)				Ng Leung-sing (Breakfast)			
Finance Committee: Establishment Subcommittee; Public Works Subcommittee	Raymond Ho (Breakfast)				Albert Chan (Democratic→Independent)			
Public Accounts Committee	Eric Li (Breakfast)				Emily Lau (Frontier)			
Committee on Members' Interests	David Chu (PA)				Sin Chung-kai (Democratic)			
House Committee: Parliamentary Liaison Subcommittee	Selina Chow (Liberal)			Miriam Lau (Liberal)	Fred Li (Democratic)			
House Committee: Parliamentary Liaison Subcommittee	Lui Ming-wah (Breakfast)				Emily Lau (Frontier)			
Committee on Rules of Procedure	Jasper Tsang (DAB)				Margaret Ng (Independent→A45CG)			
Panels
Panel on Administration of Justice and Legal Services	Margaret Ng (Independent)				Jasper Tsang (DAB)			
Panel on Commerce and Industry	Kenneth Ting (Liberal)				Hui Cheung-ching (PA)			
Panel on Constitutional Affairs	Andrew Wong (Independent)				Emily Lau (Frontier)			
Panel on Economic Services	James Tien (Liberal)				Lui Ming-wah (Breakfast)			
Panel on Education	Yeung Sum (Democratic)	Yeung Yiu-chung (DAB)	Yeung Sum (Democratic)	Yeung Yiu-chung (DAB)	Yeung Yiu-chung (DAB)	Yeung Sum (Democratic)	Yeung Yiu-chung (DAB)	Yeung Sum (Democratic)
Panel on Environmental Affairs	Ng Ching-fai (NCF)	Choy So-yuk (DAB)			Cyd Ho (Frontier)			
Panel on Financial Affairs	Ambrose Lau (PA)				Henry Wu (Independent)			
Panel on Food Safety and Environmental Hygiene	Fred Li (Democratic)				Tommy Cheung (Liberal)			
Panel on Health Services	Sophie Leung (Liberal)		Lo Wing-lok (Breakfast)	Michael Mak (Independent)	Lo Wing-lok (Breakfast)		Michael Mak (Independent)	Lo Wing-lok (Breakfast)
Panel on Home Affairs	Andrew Cheng (Democratic)	Ip Kwok-him (DAB)	Andrew Cheng (Democratic)	Ip Kwok-him (DAB)	Choy So-yuk (DAB)	Andrew Cheng (Democratic)	Choy So-yuk (DAB)	Andrew Cheng (Democratic)
Panel on Housing	Chan Kam-lam (DAB)	Albert Ho (Democratic)	Chan Kam-lam (DAB)	Albert Ho (Democratic)	Albert Ho (Democratic)	Chan Kam-lam (DAB)	Albert Ho (Democratic)	Chan Kam-lam (DAB)
Panel on Information Technology and Broadcasting	Sin Chung-kai (Democratic)				Howard Young (Liberal)			
Panel on Manpower	Lau Chin-shek (CTU)				Chan Kwok-keung (DAB)			
Panel on Planning, Lands and Works	Tang Siu-tong (PA)				Lau Ping-cheung (Independent)			
Panel on Public Service	Tam Yiu-chung (DAB)				Li Fung-ying (FLU)			
Panel on Security	Lau Kong-wah (DAB)	James To (Democratic)	Lau Kong-wah (DAB)	James To (Democratic)	James To (Democratic)	Lau Kong-wah (DAB)	James To (Democratic)	Lau Kong-wah (DAB)
Panel on Transport	Miriam Lau (Liberal)			Lau Kong-wah (DAB)	Abraham Shek (Breakfast)			Andrew Cheng (Democratic)
Panel on Welfare Services	Law Chi-kwong (Democratic)	Chan Yuen-han (DAB)	Law Chi-kwong (Democratic)	Chan Yuen-han (DAB)	Chan Yuen-han (DAB)	Law Chi-kwong (Democratic)	Chan Yuen-han (DAB)	Law Chi-kwong (Democratic)

== See also ==
- 2000 Hong Kong legislative election
- 2000 Hong Kong Island by-election
