= 3rd Legislative Council of Hong Kong =

2004–2008 Legislative Council of Hong Kong

←	2nd Legislative Council	4th Legislative Council	→
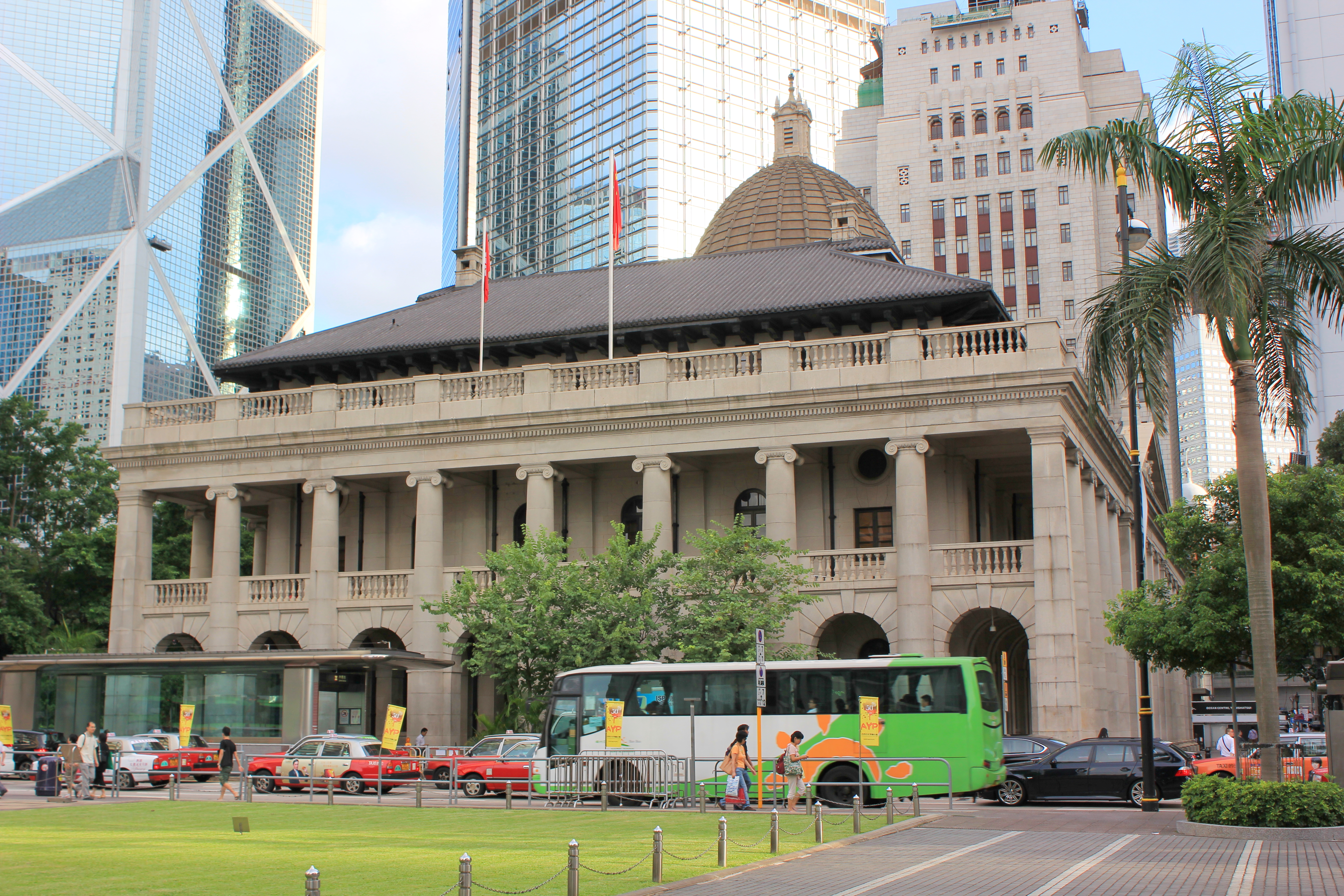

Overview
- Legislative body: Legislative Council
- Jurisdiction: Hong Kong
- Meeting place: Legislative Council Building
- Term: 1 October 2004 – 30 September 2008
- Website: legco.gov.hk/
- Members: 60 members
- President: Rita Fan (Independent)
- Party control: Pro-Beijing camp

The Third Legislative Council of Hong Kong was the meeting of the legislative branch of the Hong Kong Special Administrative Region Government. The membership of the LegCo is based on the 2004 election. The term of the session was from 1 October 2004 to 30 September 2008, during the second half of the Tung Chee-hwa's administration until his resignation in 2005 and was replaced by Donald Tsang for the rest of the term, and also the beginning of the third term of Chief Executive after Tsang won in the 2007 Election. The Democratic Alliance for the Betterment of Hong Kong (DAB) became the largest party with 10 seats (not including the two DAB members who ran under the Hong Kong Federation of Trade Unions banner). Notable newcomers to the Legislative Council included Leung Kwok-hung, Alan Leong, Ronny Tong, Albert Cheng, and Jeffrey Lam.

== Major events ==
- 21 December 2005: The pro-democrats voted down the government's constitutional reform package on the electoral methods for the 2007 chief executive (CE) and the 2008 Legislative Council (LegCo) elections.

== Major legislation ==
=== Enacted ===
- 6 August 2006: Interception of Communications and Surveillance Bill
- 19 October 2006: Smoking (Public Health) (Amendment) Bill 2005

== Composition ==
Affiliation	Election	At dissolution
Liberal Party	10	10
Democratic Alliance for the Betterment of Hong Kong	10	9
Breakfast Group/Alliance	5	5
Hong Kong Federation of Trade Unions	3	3
Federation of Hong Kong and Kowloon Labour Unions	1	1
Independent	6	1
Total for pro-Beijing camp	35	34
Democratic Party	9	9
Article 45 Concern Group/Civic Party	4	6
League of Social Democrats	0	2
Hong Kong Confederation of Trade Unions	2	2
Hong Kong Association for Democracy and People's Livelihood	1	1
Frontier	1	1
Neighbourhood and Worker's Service Centre	1	1
April Fifth Action	1	0
Independent	6	4
Total for pan-democracy camp	25	26
Total	60	60

Note: Italic represents organisations that still function but become under another affiliation.

== Graphical representation of the Legislative Council ==

Pro-democracy camp:

- LSD
- CTU
- NSWC
- Frontier
- Civic Party
- Democratic Party
- ADPL
- Independents

Pro-Beijing camp:

- Liberal Party
- Alliance
- DAB
- FTU
- FLU
- Independents

== Leadership ==
Office	Party	Officer	Constituency	Since
President	Independent	Rita Fan Hsu Lai-tai	Hong Kong Island	1998

== List of members ==
The following table is a list of LegCo members elected on 12 September 2004 in the order of precedence.

Members who did not serve throughout the term are italicised. New members elected since the general election are noted at the bottom of the page.

Key to changes since legislative election:

^{a} = change in party allegiance
^{b} = by-election

GC/ FC	Constituency	Portrait	Elected Members	Elected Party	Political Alignment	Born	Occupation(s)	Assumed Office
GC	Hong Kong Island		Rita Fan	Independent	Pro-Beijing	20 September 1945	Legislative Councillor	1998
GC	New Territories East		James Tien	Liberal	Pro-Beijing	8 January 1947	Company Chairman	1998
GC	New Territories West		Albert Ho	Democratic	Pan-democracy	1 December 1951	Solicitor and Notary Public; Legislative Councillor	1998
FC	Engineering		Raymond Ho	Breakfast Group	Pro-Beijing	23 March 1939	Engineer	1998
GC	New Territories West		Lee Cheuk-yan	CTU	Pan-democracy	12 February 1957	Legislative Councillor	1998
GC	Hong Kong Island		Martin Lee	Democratic	Pan-democracy	8 June 1938	Barrister-at-law	1998
FC	Finance		David Li	Independent	Pro-Beijing	13 March 1939	Banker	1998
GC	Kowloon East		Fred Li	Democratic	Pan-democracy	25 April 1955	Legislative Councillor	1998
FC	Industrial (Second)		Lui Ming-wah	Breakfast Group	Pro-Beijing	4 April 1937	Businessman	1998
FC	Legal		Margaret Ng	A45 Concern Group^{a}	Pan-democracy	25 January 1948	Barrister-at-law	1998
GC	New Territories West		Selina Chow	Liberal	Pro-Beijing	25 January 1945	Legislative Councillor	1998
GC	Kowloon West		James To	Democratic	Pan-democracy	11 March 1963	Solicitor	1998
FC	Education		Cheung Man-kwong	Democratic/PTU	Pan-democracy	15 September 1954	Teacher; Legislative Councillor	1998
GC	Kowloon East		Chan Yuen-han	FTU/DAB	Pro-Beijing	15 November 1946	Labour Service	1998
FC	Insurance		Bernard Chan	Breakfast Group	Pro-Beijing	11 January 1965	Company President	1998
GC	Kowloon East		Chan Kam-lam	DAB	Pro-Beijing	22 January 1949	Legislative Councillor	1998
FC	Textiles and Garment		Sophie Leung	Liberal	Pro-Beijing	9 October 1945	Company Director	1998
GC	New Territories West		Leung Yiu-chung	NWSC	Pan-democracy	19 May 1953	Legislative Councillor	1998
FC	Information Technology		Sin Chung-kai	Democratic	Pan-democracy	15 June 1960	Legislative Councillor	1998
FC	Commercial (Second)		Philip Wong	Independent	Pro-Beijing	23 December 1938	Company Chairman	1998
FC	Agriculture and Fisheries		Wong Yung-kan	DAB	Pro-Beijing	10 August 1951	Legislative Councillor	1998
GC	Kowloon West		Jasper Tsang	DAB	Pro-Beijing	14 May 1947	Legislative Councillor	1998
FC	Tourism		Howard Young	Liberal	Pro-Beijing	30 March 1948	General Manager	1998
GC	Hong Kong Island		Yeung Sum	Democratic	Pan-democracy	22 November 1947	Lecturer	1998
GC	Kowloon West		Lau Chin-shek	CTU	Pan-democracy	12 September 1944	Legislative Councillor	1998
GC	New Territories East		Lau Kong-wah	DAB	Pro-Beijing	22 June 1957	Legislative Councillor	1998
FC	District Council		Lau Wong-fat	Liberal	Pro-Beijing	15 October 1936	Company Chairman	1998
FC	Transport		Miriam Lau	Liberal	Pro-Beijing	27 April 1947	Solicitor and Notary Public	1998
GC	New Territories East		Emily Lau	Frontier	Pan-democracy	22 January 1952	Legislative Councillor	1998
GC	Hong Kong Island		Choy So-yuk	DAB	Pro-Beijing	10 October 1950	Merchant	1998
GC	New Territories East		Andrew Cheng	Democratic	Pan-democracy	28 April 1960	Solicitor	1998
FC	Sports, Performing Arts, Culture and Publication		Timothy Fok	Independent	Pro-Beijing	14 February 1946	Merchant	1998
GC	New Territories West		Tam Yiu-chung	DAB	Pro-Beijing	15 December 1949	Legislative Councillor	1998
FC	Real Estate and Construction		Abraham Shek	Breakfast Group	Pro-Beijing	24 June 1945	Company Director	2000
FC	Labour		Li Fung-ying	FLU	Pro-Beijing	2 December 1950	Trade Union Officer	2000
FC	Catering		Tommy Cheung	Liberal	Pro-Beijing	30 September 1949	Merchant; Legislative Councillor	2000
GC	New Territories West		Albert Chan	Independent^{a}	Pan-democracy	3 March 1955	Legislative Councillor	2000
GC	Kowloon West		Frederick Fung	ADPL	Pan-democracy	17 March 1953	Legislative Councillor	2000
GC	Hong Kong Island		Audrey Eu	A45 Concern Group^{a}	Pan-democracy	11 September 1953	Senior Counsel	2000 (b)
FC	Wholesale and Retail		Vincent Fang	Liberal	Pro-Beijing	7 May 1943	Chief Executive; Managing Director	2004
FC	Labour		Wong Kwok-hing	FTU/DAB	Pro-Beijing	29 March 1949	FTU Director	2004
GC	New Territories West		Lee Wing-tat	Democratic	Pan-democracy	25 December 1955	District Councillor	2004
GC	New Territories East		Li Kwok-ying	DAB	Pro-Beijing	18 November 1949	Solicitor	2004
FC	Health Services		Joseph Lee	Independent	Pan-democracy	14 August 1959	Assistant Professor	2004
FC	Heung Yee Kuk		Daniel Lam	Independent	Pro-Beijing	27 February 1949	Company Director	2004
FC	Commercial (First)		Jeffrey Lam	Liberal^{a}	Pro-Beijing	23 October 1951	Merchant	2004
GC	Hong Kong Island		Ma Lik_{†}	DAB	Pro-Beijing	23 February 1952	Deputy Publisher	2004
FC	Industrial (First)		Andrew Leung	Liberal^{a}	Pro-Beijing	24 February 1951	Merchant	2004
GC	Kowloon East^{b}		Alan Leong	A45 Concern Group^{a}	Pan-democracy	22 February 1958	Senior Counsel	2004
GC	New Territories East		Leung Kwok-hung	April Fifth Action^{a}	Pan-democracy	18 January 1957	Freelance Writer	2004
FC	Medical		Kwok Ka-ki	Independent	Pan-democracy	20 July 1961	Urologist	2004
FC	Social Welfare		Fernando Cheung	Independent^{a}	Pan-democracy	23 February 1957	Lecturer	2004
GC	New Territories West		Cheung Hok-ming	DAB	Pro-Beijing	3 July 1952	Company Director	2004
FC	Import and Export		Wong Ting-kwong	DAB	Pro-Beijing	12 September 1949	Merchant	2004
GC	New Territories East		Ronny Tong	A45 Concern Group^{a}	Pan-democracy	28 August 1950	Senior Counsel	2004
FC	Financial Services		Chim Pui-chung	Independent	Pro-Beijing	24 September 1946	Company Director	2004
FC	Architectural, Surveying and Planning		Patrick Lau	Breakfast Group	Pro-Beijing	1 June 1944	Architect; Professor	2004
GC	Kowloon East		Albert Cheng	Independent	Pan-democracy	3 July 1946	Commentator	2004
FC	Labour		Kwong Chi-kin	FTU	Pro-Beijing	15 February 1958	FTU Legal Adviser	2004
FC	Accountancy		Tam Heung-man	Independent^{a}	Pan-democracy	8 June 1957	Tax Advisor	2004

== By-election ==
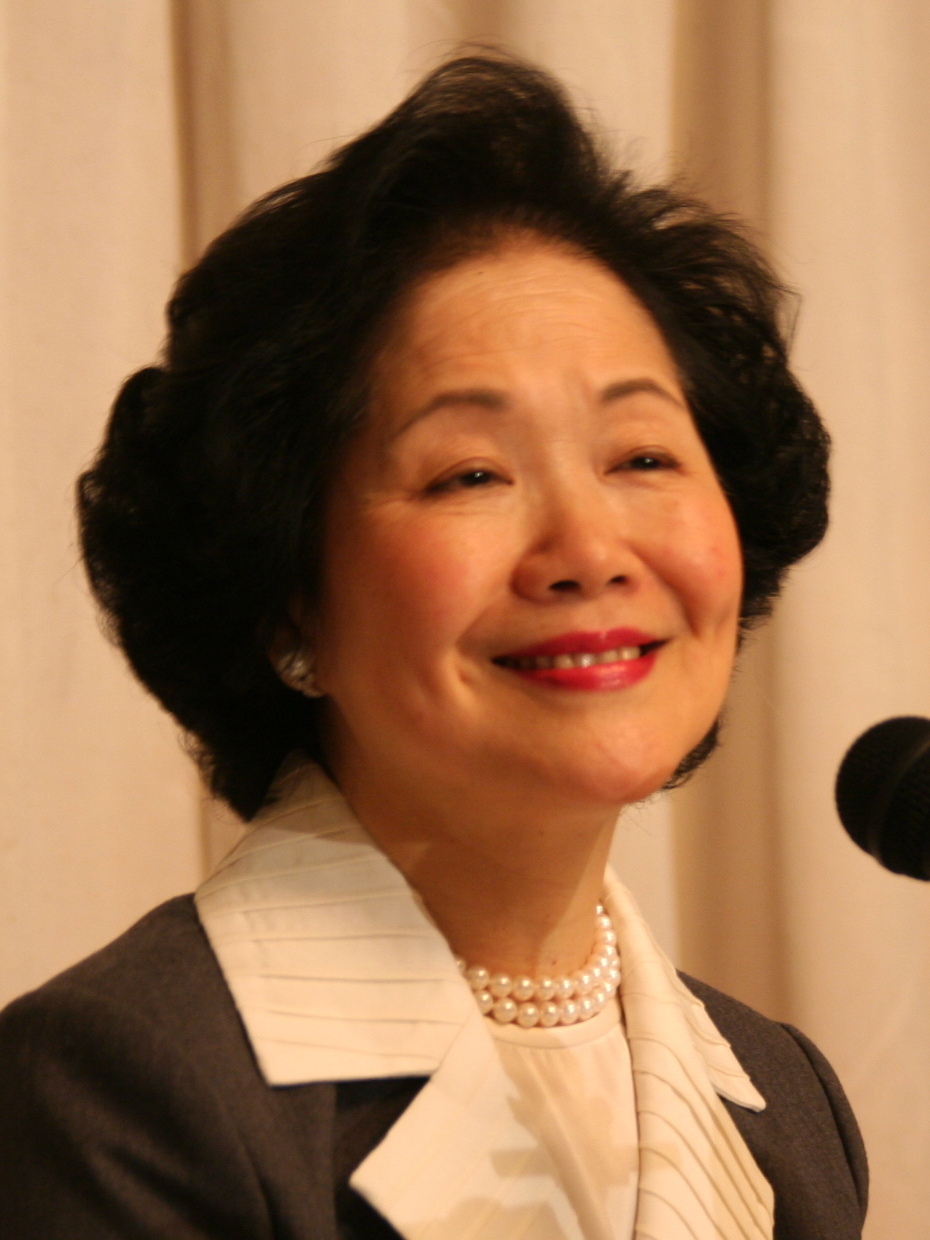
Anson Chan succeeded Ma Lik in the 2007 Hong Kong Island by-election.

- 2 December 2007, Anson Chan elected and replaced Ma Lik who died on 8 August 2007.

== Other changes ==
=== 2004 ===
- Bernard Chan (Insurance), Raymond Ho (Engineering), Patrick Lau Architectural, Surveying and Planning), Lui Ming-wah (Commercial), and Abraham Shek (Real Estate and Construction), the existing members of the Breakfast Group launched a political grouping called The Alliance.

=== 2006 ===
- Audrey Eu (Hong Kong Island), Alan Leong (Kowloon East), Ronny Tong (New Territories East and Margaret Ng (Legal) from the Article 45 Concern Group co-founded the Civic Party in March 2006 with Mandy Tam (Accountancy and Fernando Cheung (Social Welfare) joining. Audrey Eu became the first leader of the party.
- Independent Albert Chan (New Territories West) and April Fifth Action's Leung Kwok-hung co-founded the League of Social Democrats.

== Committees ==
- Finance Committee— Chair: Emily Lau (2004—07), Tam Yiu-chung (2007–08)
  - Establishment Subcommittee— Chair: Li Fung-ying
  - Public Works Subcommittee— Chair: Raymond Ho
- Public Accounts Committee— Chair: Philip Wong
- Committee on Members' Interests— Chair: Sophie Leung
- House Committee— Chair: Miriam Lau
  - Parliamentary Liaison Subcommittee— Chair: Howard Young
- Committee on Rules of Procedure— Chair: Jasper Tsang

=== Panels ===
- Panel on Administration of Justice and Legal Services— Chair: Margaret Ng
- Panel on Commerce and Industry— Chair: Sophie Leung (2004—06), Vincent Fang (2006—08)
- Panel on Constitutional Affairs— Chair: Lui Ming-wah
- Panel on Development— Chair: Lau Wong-fat
- Panel on Economic Development— Chair: James Tien (2004—06), Jeffrey Lam (2006—08)
- Panel on Education— Chair: Yeung Sum (2006—08), Jasper Tsang (2006—08)
- Panel on Environmental Affairs— Chair: Choy So-yuk (2004—06), Audrey Eu (2006—08)
- Panel on Financial Affairs— Chair: Bernard Chan (2004—06), Chan Kam-lam (2006—08)
- Panel on Food Safety and Environmental Hygiene— Chair: Fred Li (2004—06), Tommy Cheung (2006—08)
- Panel on Health Services— Chair: Andrew Cheng (2004–05), Kwok Ka-ki (2005–06), Joseph Lee (2006—07), Li Kwok-ying (2007—08)
- Panel on Home Affairs— Chair: Tommy Cheung (2004—06), Choy So-yuk (2006—08)
- Panel on Housing— Chair: Chan Kam-lam (2004—06), Lee Wing-tat (2006—08)
- Panel on Information Technology and Broadcasting— Chair: Sin Chung-kai (2004—06), Albert Cheng (2006—08)
- Panel on Manpower— Chair: Lau Chin-shek
- Panel on Public Service— Chair: Tam Yiu-chung (2004—06), Howard Young (2006—08)
- Panel on Security— Chair: James To (2004—06), Lau Kong-wah (2006—08)
- Panel on Transport— Chair: Lau Kong-wah (2004—06), Andrew Cheng (2006—08)
- Panel on Welfare Services— Chair: Chan Yuen-han (2004—05, 2006–07), Fernando Cheung (2005—06, 2007–08)

== See also ==
- 2004 Hong Kong legislative election
- 2007 Hong Kong Island by-election
