= List of the Legislative Council of Hong Kong =

Terms of the Legislative Council of the Hong Kong Special Administrative Region include:

- 1st Legislative Council of Hong Kong, from 1998 to 2000
- 2nd Legislative Council of Hong Kong, from 2000 to 2004
- 3rd Legislative Council of Hong Kong, from 2004 to 2008
- 4th Legislative Council of Hong Kong, from 2008 to 2012
- 5th Legislative Council of Hong Kong, from 2012 to 2016
- 6th Legislative Council of Hong Kong, from 2016 to 2021
- 7th Legislative Council of Hong Kong, from 2022 to 2025
- 8th Legislative Council of Hong Kong, from 2026
