= Ho Kai-ming (FTU) =

- 何啟明
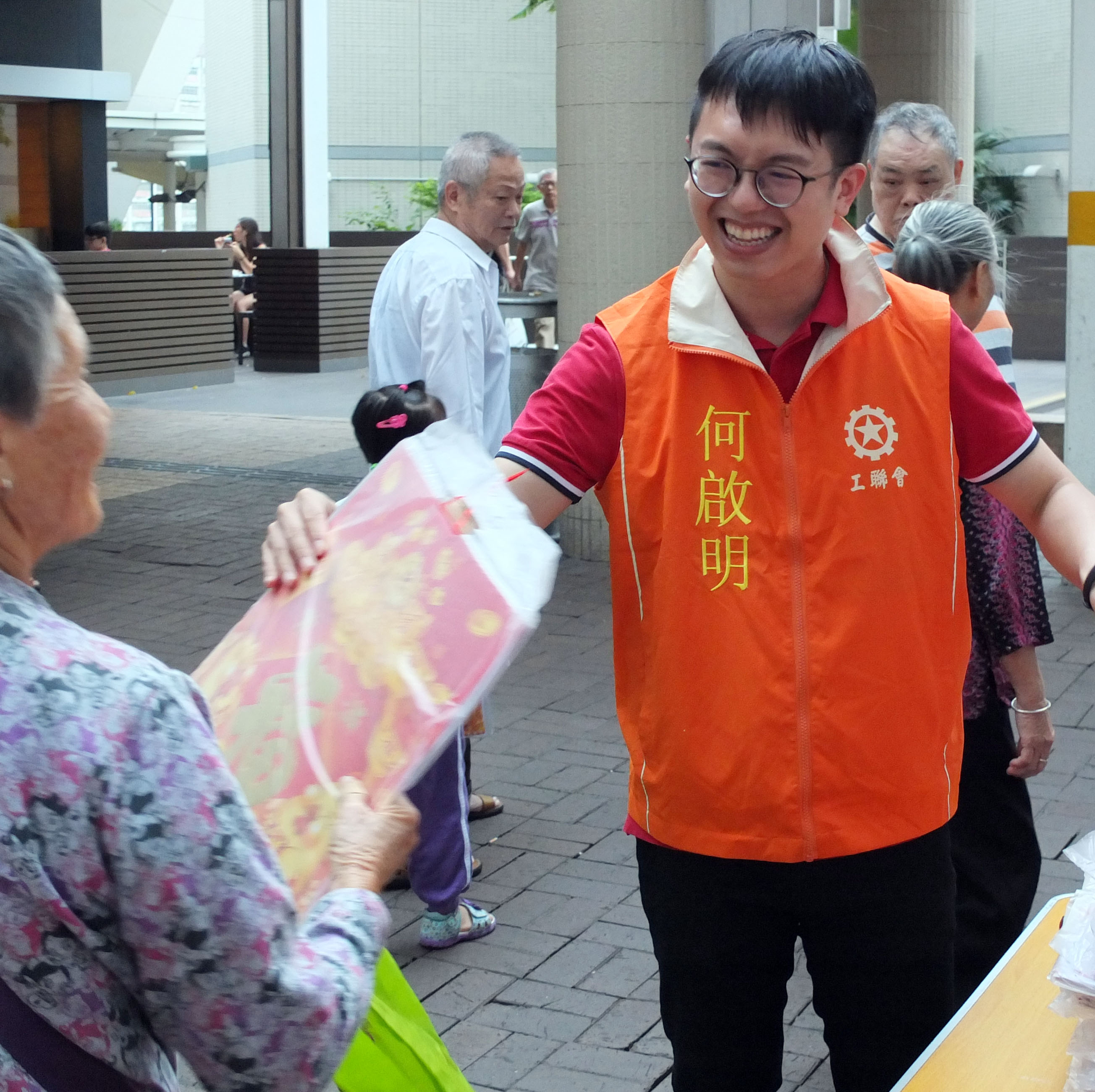

3rd Under Secretary for Labour and Welfare
- Incumbent
- Assumed office 1 June 2020
- Preceded by: Caspar Tsui

Member of the Legislative Council
- In office 1 October 2016 – 31 May 2020 Serving with Luk Chung-hung and Poon Siu-ping
- Preceded by: Kwok Wai-keung
- Succeeded by: Leung Tsz-wing (2022)
- Constituency: Labour

Member of the Kwun Tong District Council
- In office 1 January 2012 – 31 December 2019
- Preceded by: Francis Tang Chi-ho
- Succeeded by: Chan Man-kin
- Constituency: Pak Nga

Personal details
- Born: 6 January 1985 (age 41) British Hong Kong
- Party: Hong Kong Federation of Trade Unions
- Education: Wah Yan College, Kowloon
- Alma mater: Chinese University of Hong Kong

Ho Kai-ming
- Traditional Chinese: 何啟明
- Simplified Chinese: 何启明
Transcriptions
Standard Mandarin
- Hanyu Pinyin: Hé Qǐmíng
Yue: Cantonese
- Yale Romanization: Hòh Kái mìhng
- Jyutping: Ho^{4} Kai^{2} ming^{4}

Jonathan Ho Kai-ming (Chinese: 何啟明; born 6 January 1985) is a Hong Kong politician. He is member of the Hong Kong Federation of Trade Unions (HKFTU) and former member of the Kwun Tong District Council. In the 2016 Hong Kong Legislative Council election, he was elected to the Legislative Council of Hong Kong through the Labour functional constituency.

He was educated at Tak Sun School and Wah Yan College, Kowloon. He graduated from the Chinese University of Hong Kong. He is member of the Hong Kong Federation of Trade Unions and member of the social affairs committee of the HKFTU. He was first elected to the Kwun Tong District Council in Pak Nga in the 2011 District Council election, and lost his seat in 2019.

He first participated in the 2012 Legislative Council election, standing in the fourth place in the HKFTU's Kowloon East ticket. In the 2016 election, he took the HKFTU's seat in the Labour functional constituency with Luk Chung-hung in the Legislative Council of Hong Kong.

Political offices
| Preceded by Francis Tang | Member of Kwun Tong District Council; Representative for Pak Nga; 2012–2019 | Succeeded by Chan Man-kin |
| Preceded by Caspar Tsui | Under Secretary for Labour and Welfare; 2020–present | Incumbent |
Legislative Council of Hong Kong
| Preceded by Kwok Wai-keung; Tang Ka-piu | Member of Legislative Council; Representative for Labour; 2016–2020; Served alongside: Luk Chung-hung, Poon Siu-ping | Succeeded by Leung Tsz-wing |
