= Ip Wai-ming =

Ip Wai-ming MH
- 葉偉明
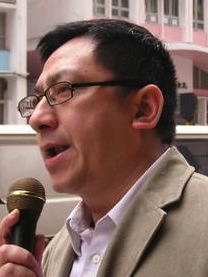

Member of the Legislative Council of Hong Kong
- In office 1 October 2008 – 30 September 2012
- Preceded by: Kwong Chi-kin
- Succeeded by: Kwok Wai-keung
- Constituency: Labour

Personal details
- Born: 1965 (age 60–61) Hong Kong
- Party: Hong Kong Federation of Trade Unions
- Education: Hong Kong Polytechnic University; Peking University (LL.B., LL.M.)
- Occupation: Trade Union Worker

Ip Wai-ming
- Traditional Chinese: 葉偉明
- Simplified Chinese: 叶伟明
Transcriptions
Standard Mandarin
- Hanyu Pinyin: Yè Wěimíng

Ip Wai-ming, MH (Chinese: 葉偉明; born 1965) is the member of the Legislative Council of Hong Kong in functional constituency (Labour) (2008–2012). He is the labour representative of the Labour Advisory Board of the Hong Kong Federation of Trade Unions.

Legislative Council of Hong Kong
Preceded by Kwong Chi-kin	Member of Legislative Council; Representative for Labour; 2008–2012; Served alongside: Li Fung-ying, Pan Pey-chyou	Succeeded by Kwok Wai-keung
