= Tang Ka-piu =

Hong Kong politician

- 鄧家彪
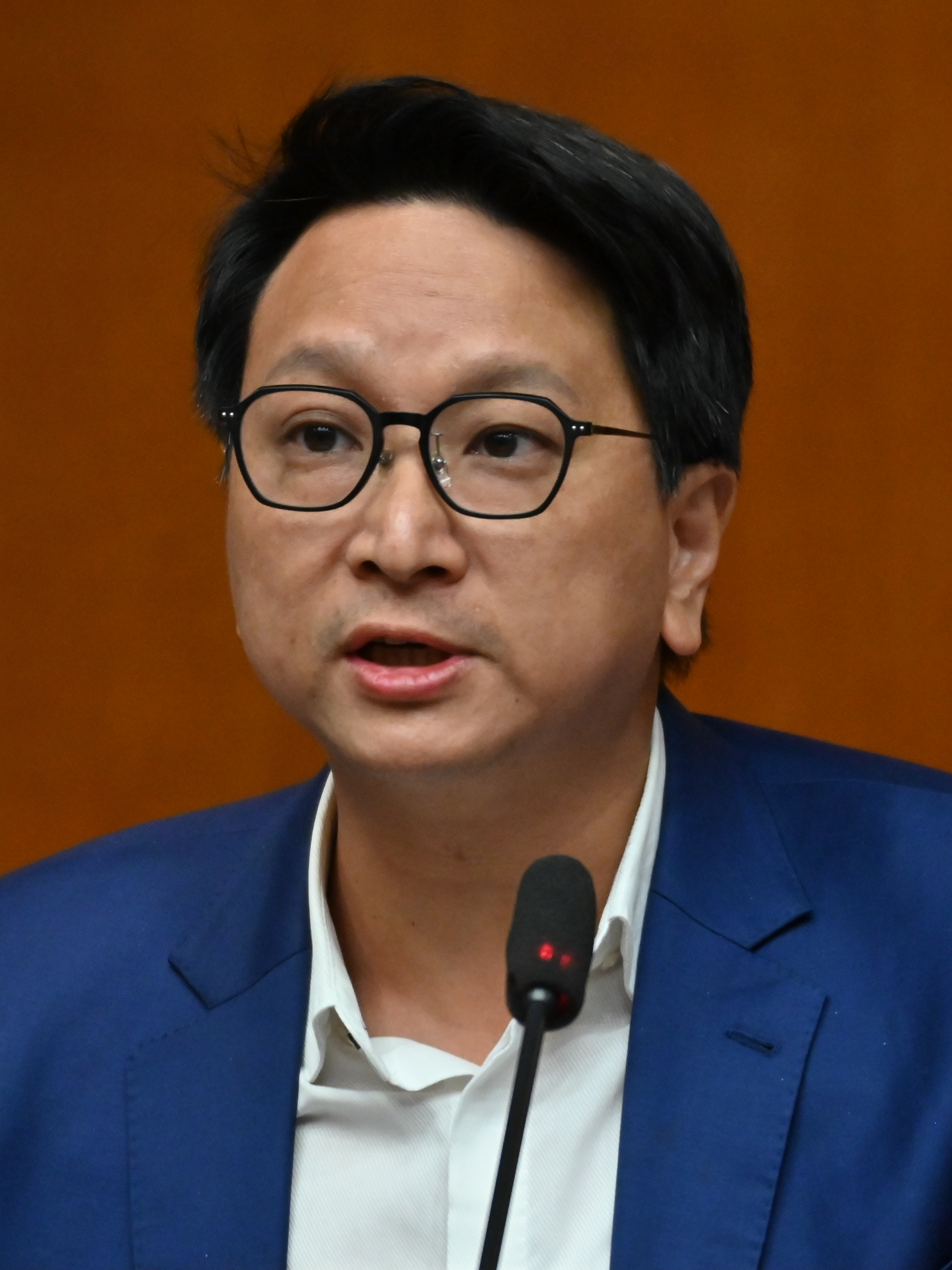
- Tang in 2025

Member of the Legislative Council
- Incumbent
- Assumed office 1 January 2022
- Preceded by: New constituency
- Constituency: Kowloon East
- In office 10 October 2012 – 30 September 2016 Serving with Kwok Wai-keung, Poon Siu-ping
- Preceded by: Pan Pey-chyou
- Succeeded by: Luk Chung-hung
- Constituency: Labour

Personal details
- Born: 29 October 1979 (age 46) British Hong Kong
- Party: Hong Kong Federation of Trade Unions; Democratic Alliance for the Betterment and Progress of Hong Kong
- Education: Chinese University of Hong Kong (Bachelor of Social Science)
- Occupation: Registered social worker

Tang Ka-piu
- Traditional Chinese: 鄧家彪
Transcriptions
Yue: Cantonese
- Yale Romanization: Dahng Gā-bīu
- Jyutping: Dang^{6} Gaa^{1}-biu^{1}

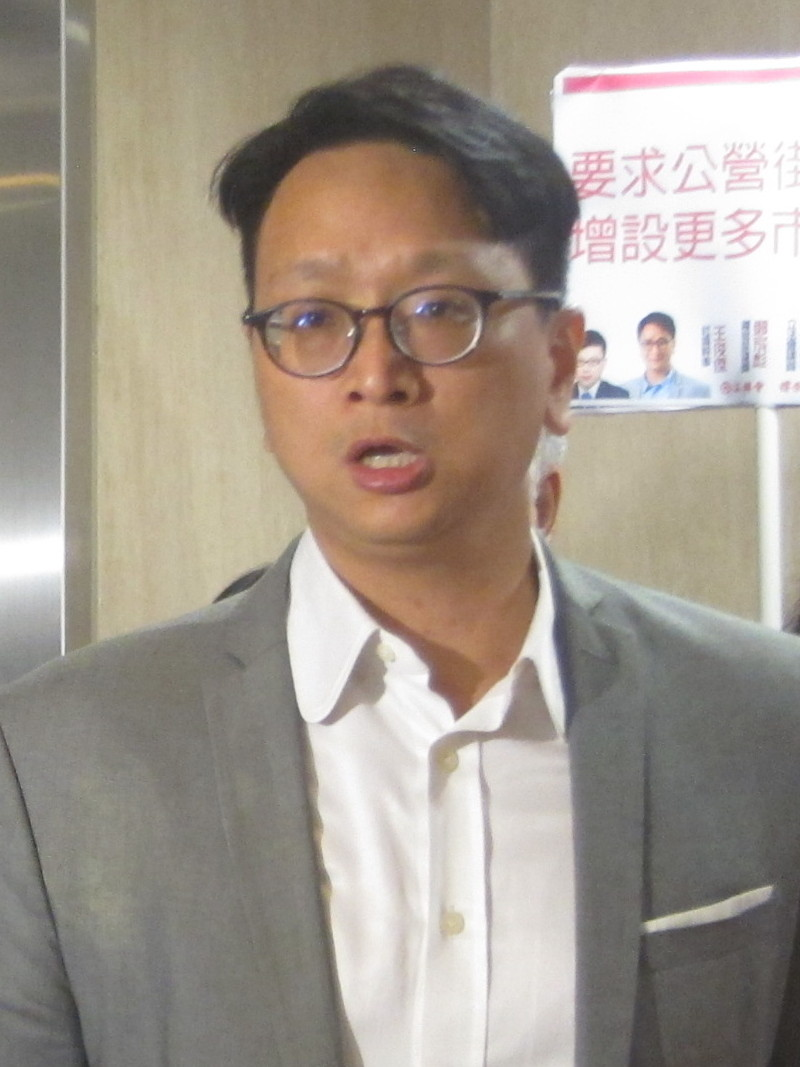
Tang in 2018

Bill Tang Ka-piu (Chinese: 鄧家彪, born 29 October 1979) is a Hong Kong politician who serves as a legislative councillor and previously district councillor (2007–2019).

== Political career ==
=== Legislative Council ===
He was a member of the Legislative Council of Hong Kong for the Labour constituency between 2012 and 2016. He participated in the 2008 LegCo election with Wong Kwok-hing, representing the Hong Kong Federation of Trade Unions, the largest pro-Beijing labour union in Hong Kong. In the 2012 LegCo election he gained a seat in the Labour constituency uncontested.

In the 2016 LegCo election, Tang ran in the New Territories East geographic constituency but was not elected.

Tang ran again in New Territories East constituency during the 2018 by-elections, but he was again not elected. It was reported that he spent approximately HK$2.24 million on this campaign, mostly on advertising and meals.

Tang ran in Kowloon East in both the postponed 2020 and 2021 Legislative Council election, and returned to the legislative council after the absence of pro-democracy forces.

In August 2022, after Nancy Pelosi visited Taiwan, Tang said "China will take resolute and powerful countermeasures to protect its sovereignty and security interests."

In October 2022, Tang was unhappy that medicine made in China was listed as tier 2, whereas other countries' medicine was listed as tier 1.

In December 2022, Tang was part of 3 lawmakers who drafted legislation to reform CUHK's governing council, saying "During the anti-government turmoil in 2019, there was a riot on the campus of CUHK but the attitude and handling of the incident by CUHK were appalling." In September 2023, Tang drew criticism for the legislation, with former lawmaker Abraham Shek asking "They should table the bill with the university's endorsement. Why do they have to be that authoritarian?"

In October 2023, Tang said that a complete ban on Japanese seafood would be the "best," but said he would not reduce his consumption of Japanese seafood.

In November 2024, Tang suggested having baby photos displayed in government offices, in an effort to have government employees have babies and boost the birth rate.

In December 2025, Tang was re-elected through Kowloon East constituency.

=== District Councils ===
He was also a district councillor for the Islands District Council, representing Yat Tung Estate North. He was first elected in the 2007 election, and was re-elected in 2011 and 2015. In the 2019 District Council election he ran for a seat on Sha Tin District Council in the newly created Shui Chuen O constituency, but lost to pro-democracy candidate Lo Tak-ming of Community Sha Tin.

== Property ==
According to Tang's January 2022 declaration of assets, he owns a flat in Guangdong.

== Focus on the topic ==
During his tenure as a legislator, Tang once paid attention to Pyramid selling controversy, MPF hedging and high handling fees, Hong Kong Elderly Care Home Issues, remote island infrastructure issues, Asia Television's wage arrears and non-renewal of licence.

== Notes ==
Political offices
New constituency	Member of Islands District Council; Representative for Yat Tung Estate North; 2008–2019	Succeeded by Fong Lung-fei
Legislative Council of Hong Kong
Preceded by Pan Pey-chyou	Member of Legislative Council; Representative for Labour; 2012–2016; Served alongside: Kwok Wai-keung, Poon Siu-ping	Succeeded by Luk Chung-hung
New constituency	Member of Legislative Council; Representative for Kowloon East; 2022–present	Incumbent
