= Poon Siu-ping =

The Honourable Poon Siu-ping BBS, MH
- 潘兆平
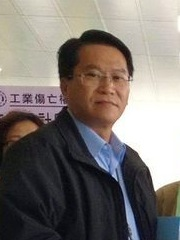

Member of the Legislative Council
- In office 1 October 2012 – 31 December 2021
- Preceded by: Li Fung-ying
- Succeeded by: Chau Siu-chung
- Constituency: Labour

Personal details
- Born: 1957 (age 68–69)
- Party: Federation of Hong Kong and Kowloon Labour Unions
- Occupation: Trade Union Worker

Poon Siu-ping, BBS, MH (Chinese: 潘兆平, born 1957) is a former member of the Legislative Council of Hong Kong for Labour constituency. He is also the chairman of the Federation of Hong Kong and Kowloon Labour Unions.

== Background ==
Poon was in the Election Committee for the Labour constituency from 1996 to 1998, which he rejoined in 2006. He was a member of the Mandatory Provident Fund Schemes Advisory Committee between 1998 and 2005. In 2012, he succeeded Li Fung-ying in the Legislative Council of Hong Kong as an uncontested candidate in the Labour constituency.

Legislative Council of Hong Kong
Preceded by Li Fung-ying	Member of Legislative Council; Representative for Labour; 2012–present Served alongside: Kwok Wai-keung, Tang Ka-piu	Succeeded by Chau Siu-chung
Order of precedence
Preceded by Elizabeth Quat; Member of the Legislative Council	Hong Kong order of precedence Member of the Legislative Council	Succeeded by Ann Chiang; Member of the Legislative Council
