= Chau Siu-chung =

Hong Kong labour union worker and politician

The Honourable Chau Siu-chung
- 周小松
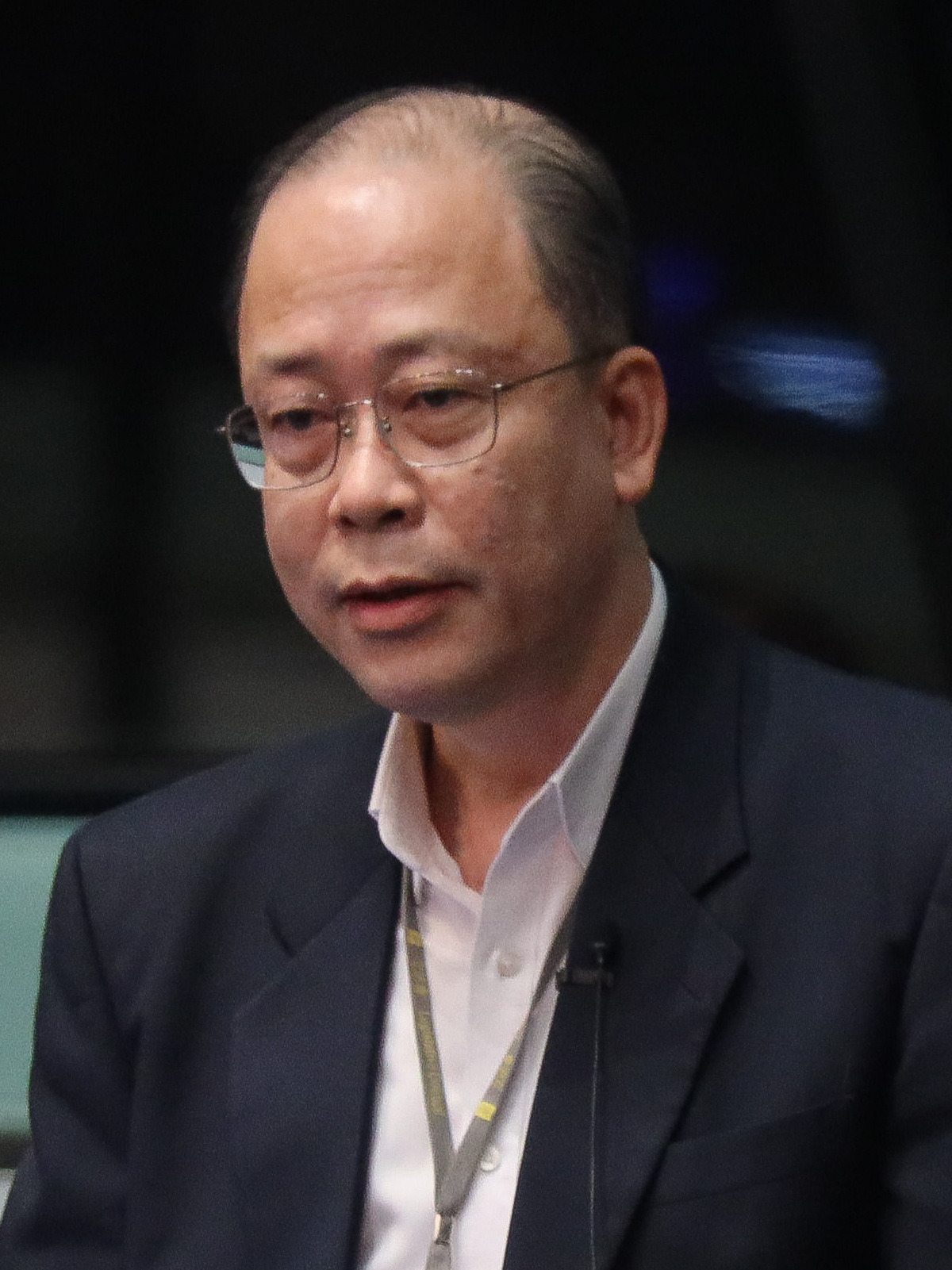
- Chau in 2023

Member of the Legislative Council
- Incumbent
- Assumed office 1 January 2022
- Preceded by: Poon Siu-ping
- Constituency: Labour

Personal details
- Born: 56–57
- Citizenship: Hong Kong
- Party: FLU

Chau Siu-chung is a Hong Kong labour union worker and politician, currently a member of Legislative Council for the Labour constituency since 2022.

He won the seat again in 2025 Legislative Council through the same constituency.

He is also the secretary-general for the pro-Beijing labour union Federation of Hong Kong and Kowloon Labour Unions, and a member of the Election Committee responsible for electing the Chief Executive.

== Electoral performances ==
2021 Legislative Council election: Labour
Party	Candidate	Votes	%	±%
FTU	Kwok Wai-keung	398		
FTU	Dennis Leung Tsz-wing	373		
FLU	Chau Siu-chung	371		
Nonpartisan	Lee Kwong-yu	116		
Total valid votes				
Rejected ballots				
Turnout		488	73.72	
Registered electors		697		
FTU hold		Swing		
FTU hold		Swing		
FLU hold		Swing		

Legislative Council of Hong Kong
Preceded by Poon Siu-ping	Member of Legislative Council; Representative for Labour; 2022–present	Incumbent
