= Li Fung-ying =

Li Fung-ying SBS, JP
- 李鳳英

Member of the Legislative Council of Hong Kong
- In office 1 October 2000 – 30 September 2012
- Preceded by: Lee Kai-ming
- Succeeded by: Poon Siu-ping
- Constituency: Labour

Personal details
- Born: 2 December 1950 (age 75) Hong Kong
- Party: Federation of Hong Kong and Kowloon Labour Unions
- Spouse: Lai Kam-keung
- Occupation: Trade Union Officer

Li Fung-ying SBS MBE JP (Chinese: 李鳳英) (born 2 December 1950 in Hong Kong) is a trades unionist in Hong Kong. She is the third vice-chairperson of the Federation of Hong Kong and Kowloon Labour Unions, the third largest trade union in Hong Kong. Until 2012, she was a member of the Legislative Council of Hong Kong (Legco), in the Labour functional constituency.

Although the Federation of Hong Kong and Kowloon Labour Unions is the subsidiary trade union of the Hong Kong Confederation of Trade Unions (pro-democracy camp), Li's political stance is categorized to be in pro-Beijing camp in the Legco.

Legislative Council of Hong Kong
Preceded by Lee Kai-ming	Member of Legislative Council; Representative for Labour; 2000–2012; With: Leung Fu-wah, Chan Kwok-keung (2000–2004); Kwong Chi-kin, Wong Kwok-hing (2004–2008); Ip Wai-ming, Pan Pey-chyou (2004–2012)	Succeeded by Poon Siu-ping
