= Pan Pey-chyou =

- 潘佩璆

Member of the Legislative Council of Hong Kong
- In office 1 October 2008 – 30 September 2012
- Preceded by: Wong Kwok-hing
- Succeeded by: Tang Ka-piu
- Constituency: Labour

Personal details
- Born: 9 November 1955 (age 70) Taipei, Taiwan
- Party: Hong Kong Federation of Trade Unions
- Other political affiliations: Democratic Alliance for the Betterment and Progress of Hong Kong (2008–12)
- Education: University of Hong Kong
- Occupation: Psychiatrist

Dr. Pan Pey-chyou (Chinese: 潘佩璆; born 9 November 1955) is a Hong Kong politician and psychiatrist.

== Early life ==
Pan Pey-chyou was born in Taipei, Taiwan on 9 November 1955. He emigrated with his family first to Singapore at the age of three, and then to Hong Kong at six. He spoke Mandarin Chinese as a native language.

== In politics ==
Pan served as a member of the Legislative Council of Hong Kong representing the Labour functional constituency from 2008 to 2001. He is the vice-chairman of the Hong Kong Federation of Trade Unions. He is also a member of the Democratic Alliance for the Betterment and Progress of Hong Kong.

== Medical career ==
Pan graduated from the University of Hong Kong with an MBBS degree and works as a doctor at the psychiatry department of the United Christian Hospital in Kwun Tong, Kowloon.

He is an Honorary Clinical Associate Professor of Psychiatry Department of the Chinese University of Hong Kong.

Legislative Council of Hong Kong
Preceded by Wong Kwok-hing	Member of Legislative Council; Representative for Labour; 2008–2012; Served alongside: Li Fung-ying, Ip Wai-ming	Succeeded by Tang Ka-piu
