= Hotels and Catering (constituency) =

Former Hong Kong functional constituency

Hotels and Catering 酒店及飲食界
- Former Functional constituency for the Legislative Council of Hong Kong
- Electorate: 69,592

Former constituency
- Created: 1995
- Abolished: 1997
- Number of members: One
- Member: Chan Wing-chan (DAB)
- Replaced by: Catering

Hotels and Catering was a functional constituency in the elections for the Legislative Council of Hong Kong. It was first created in 1995 as one of the nine new functional constituencies under the electoral reform carried out by the then Governor Chris Patten, in which the electorate consisted of total of 75,174 eligible voters worked related to the hotel and catering sectors.

== History ==
Hotels and Catering was created as part of the Governor of Hong Kong, Chris Patten's electoral reforms in time for the 1995 Hong Kong legislative election, the last Legislative Council election to be held in British Hong Kong before the handover of Hong Kong to China. In the election, Chan Wing-chan of the Democratic Alliance for the Betterment of Hong Kong (DAB) was elected to represent Hotels and Catering.

Due to the People's Republic of China viewing that the electoral reforms and 1995 election were incompatible with the Sino-British Joint Declaration or Hong Kong Basic Law, they refused to recognised them as valid and refused to allow the elected Hong Kong Legislative Council elected to sit in the "through-train" arrangement following the Handover. The constituency was abolished with the colonial Legislative Council dissolved after the transfer of the sovereignty in 1997 and was not included in the Chinese-backed Provisional Legislative Council.

A similar Catering functional constituency was created for the 2000 election by the Hong Kong Special Administrative Region Government with a much narrower electorate base, which only consists of holders of food business licences.

== Councillors represented ==
Election	Member	Party
1995	Chan Wing-chan	DAB
1997	Legislative Council dissolved	

== Election results ==
1995 Legislative Council election: Hotels and Catering
Party	Candidate	Votes	%	±%
DAB	Chan Wing-chan	5,614	30.89	
Independent	Chiang Sai-cheong	5,176	28.48	
Liberal	Tommy Cheung Yu-yan	3,991	21.96	
Independent	Li Hon-shing	3,393	18.67	
Majority		438	2.41	
Total valid votes		18,174	100.00	
Rejected ballots		1,616		
Turnout		19,790	28.44	
Registered electors		69,592		
DAB win (new seat)				
