= Provident (constituency) =

Hong Kong constituency

- Elected constituency for the Eastern District Council
- Boundary of Provident in Eastern District
- District: Eastern
- Legislative Council constituency: Hong Kong Island East
- Population: 20,643 (2019)
- Electorate: 9,722 (2019)

Current constituency
- Created: 1994
- Number of members: One
- Member: Kwok Wai-keung (FTU)
- Created from: North Point North

Provident (Chinese: 和富) is one of the 35 constituencies in the Eastern District, Hong Kong.

The constituency returns one district councillor to the Eastern District Council, with an election every four years. The seat is currently held by Kwok Wai-keung of the Hong Kong Federation of Trade Unions since the 2007 election.

Provident constituency is loosely based on the areas around Provident Centre and Wharf Road in North Point with an estimated population of 20,643.

== Councillors represented ==
Election	Member	Party	%
1994	Wong Kwok-hing	DAB/FTU	86.32
1999	Wong Kwok-hing	DAB/FTU	N/A
2003	Wong Kwok-hing	DAB/FTU	71.77
2007	Kwok Wai-keung	Independent→FTU/DAB	89.83
2011	Kwok Wai-keung	FTU/DAB	N/A
2015	Kwok Wai-keung	FTU/DAB	N/A
2019	Kwok Wai-keung	FTU/DAB	49.68

== Election results ==
=== 2010s ===
Eastern District Council Election, 2019: Provident
Party	Candidate	Votes	%	±%
FTU	Kwok Wai-keung	3,229	49.68	
Nonpartisan	Duncann Chan	3,181	48.94	
ASEA	Andrew Lam Sze-nam	90	1.38	
Majority		48	0.74	
Turnout		6,523	67.10	
FTU hold		Swing		

Eastern District Council Election, 2015: Provident
Party	Candidate	Votes	%	±%
FTU	Kwok Wai-keung	Uncontested		
FTU hold		Swing		

Eastern District Council Election, 2011: Provident
Party	Candidate	Votes	%	±%
FTU (DAB)	Kwok Wai-keung	Uncontested		
FTU hold		Swing		

=== 2000s ===
Eastern District Council Election, 2007: Provident
Party	Candidate	Votes	%	±%
Nonpartisan	Kwok Wai-keung	2,527	89.8	
Independent	Chong Chung-hing	286	10.2	
Nonpartisan gain from DAB		Swing		

Eastern District Council Election, 2003: Provident
Party	Candidate	Votes	%	±%
DAB	Wong Kwok-hing	2,665	71.8	
Independent	Alan Leung Koon-lun	1,048	28.2	
DAB hold		Swing		

=== 1990s ===
Eastern District Council Election, 1999: Provident
Party	Candidate	Votes	%	±%
DAB	Wong Kwok-hing	Uncontested		
DAB hold		Swing		

Eastern District Board Election, 1994: Provident
Party	Candidate	Votes	%	±%
DAB	Wong Kwok-hing	1,527	84.1	
Liberal	Wong Wing-cheong	242	13.3	
DAB win (new seat)				
