= Siu Sai Wan (constituency) =

Hong Kong constituency

- Elected constituency for the Eastern District Council
- Boundary of Siu Sai Wan in Eastern District
- District: Eastern
- Legislative Council constituency: Hong Kong Island East
- Population: 12,460 (2019)
- Electorate: 8,654 (2019)

Current constituency
- Created: 1994
- Number of members: One
- Member: Vacant
- Created from: Chai Wan South

Siu Sai Wan (Chinese: 小西灣) is one of the 35 constituencies in the Eastern District.

The constituency returns one district councillor to the Eastern District Council, with an election every four years. The seat was last held by Chan Wing-tai.

Siu Sai Wan constituency is loosely based on Siu Sai Wan Estate with estimated population of 12,460.

== Councillors represented ==
Election	Member	Party	%
1994	Chan Oi-kwan	DAB	52.21
1999	Chan Oi-kwan	DAB	66.72
2003	Chan Oi-kwan	DAB	69.56
2007	Chan Oi-kwan	DAB	80.61
2011	Chan Oi-kwan	FTU/DAB	N/A
2015	Wong Kwok-hing	FTU	49.61
2019	Chan Wing-tai→Vacant (Note: Disqualified on 15 September 2021 after his oath was invalid.)	Independent democrat	53.67

== Election results ==
=== 2010s ===
Eastern District Council Election, 2019: Siu Sai Wan
Party	Candidate	Votes	%	±%
Ind. democrat	Lancelot Chan Wing-tai	3,212	53.67	
FTU (DAB)	Li Kok-yan	2,485	41.52	−8.08
Independent	Chu Yat-on	288	4.81	
Majority		727	12.15	
Turnout		5,994	69.29	
Ind. democrat gain from FTU		Swing		

Eastern District Council Election, 2015: Siu Sai Wan
Party	Candidate	Votes	%	±%
FTU	Wong Kwok-hing	1,981	49.6	
People Power	Tam Tak-chi	1,229	30.8	
Nonpartisan	Chu Yat-on	783	19.6	
Majority		762	18.8	
Turnout		4,030	48.7	
FTU hold		Swing		

Eastern District Council Election, 2011: Siu Sai Wan
Party	Candidate	Votes	%	±%
FTU (DAB)	Chan Oi-kwan	uncontested		
FTU hold		Swing		

=== 2000s ===
Eastern District Council Election, 2007: Siu Sai Wan
Party	Candidate	Votes	%	±%
DAB	Chan Oi-kwan	2,308	80.6	
Democratic	Susan Yan Shun-kwan	555	19.4	
Majority		1,753	61.2	+22.0
DAB hold		Swing		

Eastern District Council Election, 2003: Siu Sai Wan
Party	Candidate	Votes	%	±%
DAB	Chan Oi-kwan	1,997	69.6	+3.2
Justice Union	Leung Suet-fong	874	30.4	
Majority		1,123	39.2	+5.9
DAB hold		Swing		

=== 1990s ===
Eastern District Council Election, 1999: Siu Sai Wan
Party	Candidate	Votes	%	±%
DAB	Chan Oi-kwan	1,824	66.4	+14.2
Democratic	Wiggo Lee Wai-chiu	910	33.1	+13.3
Majority		914	33.3	+9.1
DAB hold		Swing		

Eastern District Board Election, 1994: Siu Sai Wan
Party	Candidate	Votes	%	±%
DAB	Chan Oi-kwan	946	52.2	
Liberal	Poon Ka-fung	508	28.0	
Democratic	Wong Hung-chiu	358	19.8	
Majority		438	24.2	
DAB win (new seat)				
