= Pang Chun-hoi =

Chinese trade unionist and politician in Hong Kong

Pang Chun-hoi MBE
- 彭震海

Member of the Legislative Council
- In office 30 October 1985 – 31 July 1995
- Preceded by: New constituency
- Succeeded by: Lee Kai-ming
- Constituency: Labour

Personal details
- Born: 26 June 1921 Shanghai, China
- Died: 28 February 2003 (aged 81) Hong Kong
- Party: HKTUC; Kuomintang
- Spouse: Yang Wai-chang
- Children: 6
- Occupation: Trade unionist, politician

Pang Chun-hoi, MBE (Chinese: 彭震海; 26 June 1921 – 28 February 2003) was a trade unionist and a member of the member of the Legislative Council of Hong Kong (1985–95) for the Labour constituency. He was also vice-president of the Hong Kong and Kowloon Trades Union Council, a pro-Kuomintang union, and chairman of the Cotton Industry Workers' General Union.

== Early life ==
Pang was born in Shanghai, China on 26 June 1921. He moved to Hong Kong with his family in 1949.

== Career ==
In 1952, Pang was a clerk in a cotton mills. In the 1950s, founded the Cotton Industry Workers' General Union for the cotton mill workers and successfully implemented the eight-hour shift system before he became its chairman in 1957. He also became the executive committee member of the Hong Kong and Kowloon Trades Union Council (TUC), the largest pro-Kuomintang labour union at the time and later became its vice-president. He became member of the Kuomintang in 1962 and attended the 11th and 12th National Congress of Kuomintang in 1976 and 1981.

He was appointed by the colonial government to the Labour Advisory Board in 1965. During the 1967 labour disputes which later turned into Hong Kong 1967 leftist riots, Pang opposed the pro-Beijing leftist workers' intimidation to young workers to join the labour strikes on 29 May. He urged the workers to report for work the following day with the assurance that government protection would be sought for them against the intimidators. Three textiles mills, Nan Fung Textiles, Central Textiles and Wyler Textiles operated normally the next morning as a result. In 1978, he was awarded Member of the Order of the British Empire (MBE).

In the 1985 Legislative Council election in which direct elections were introduced for the first time, Pang won a seat in the two-seat Labour constituency carefully designed by the colonial government to maintain the balance of power between the pro-Taipei and pro-Beijing unions. Pang was elected uncontestedly alongside Tam Yiu-chung of the pro-Beijing Hong Kong Federation of Trade Unions (FTU). He was re-elected in 1988 uncontestedly and in again 1991 for the third term.

Pang voted closely with the liberal camp in the legislature. He was one of the swing votes during the 1994 Hong Kong electoral reform introduced by Chris Patten, the last Governor of Hong Kong for a more democratic legislature on the eve of the handover of Hong Kong strongly opposed by Beijing. He was lobbied by Allen Lee, chairman of the Liberal Party who tabled an alternative proposal which was backed by Beijing in replacement of Patten's proposal, as well as Lu Ping, director of the Hong Kong and Macao Affairs Office. He voted against Liberal proposal and voted for Patten proposal. He stepped down for the Legislative Council in 1995.

== Personal life ==
Pang married Yang Wai-chang and had one son and five daughters.

On 28 February 2003, Pang died of heart attack. Pang was 81 years old. In his funeral, his coffin was covered with the flag of Kuomintang.

Legislative Council of Hong Kong
| New constituency | Member of Legislative Council; Representative for Labour; 1985–1995 | Succeeded by Lee Kai-ming |
