= Hong Kong and Kowloon Trades Union Council =

Trade union federation in Hong Kong

Hong Kong and Kowloon Trades Union Council 港九工團聯合總會
- Chairman: Lee Kwok-keung
- Founded: September 1948
- Headquarters: Room 20, 4th floor, Yick Fat Building, 1048 King's Road, Quarry Bay, Hong Kong Island
- Membership (2019): ▼5,020
- Ideology: Tridemism; Anti-communism (HK); Labourism
- Political position: Centre-right to right-wing
- Regional affiliation: Pro-Kuomintang camp
- Colours: Blue
- Legislative Council: 0 / 90
- District Councils: 0 / 470

The Hong Kong and Kowloon Trades Union Council is the third largest trade union federation in Hong Kong, after the Federation of Trade Unions (FTU) and pro-Beijing Federation of Hong Kong and Kowloon Labour Unions (FLU). It is affiliated with the International Trade Union Confederation.

HKTUC has been pro-Kuomintang, one of the main political parties of the Republic of China, since its establishment in 1948 and has maintained a close relationship with the party. It was the biggest rival to the leftist trade unions FTU and was seen as a rightist union. The former leader of the union, Pang Chun-hoi was the Legislative Council member for the Labour constituency from 1985 to 1995, while another seat of the two was occupied by the FTU leader Tam Yiu-chung before the handover of Hong Kong in 1997.
