= Leung Fu-wah =

Hong Kong politician and trade unionist

Leung Fu-wah 梁富華 BBS, MH, JP

Member of the Legislative Council
- In office 1 October 2000 – 30 September 2004
- Preceded by: Chan Wing-chan
- Succeeded by: Kwong Chi-kin
- Constituency: Labour

Personal details
- Born: 21 October 1951 (age 74) Hong Kong
- Party: Hong Kong Federation of Trade Unions
- Education: University of Jinan
- Occupation: Trade unionist

Leung Fu-wah, BBS, MH, JP (born 21 October 1951, Hong Kong) is a trade unionist and vice-chairman of the Hong Kong Federation of Trade Unions. He was the member of the Legislative Council of Hong Kong in 2000–04 for the Labour. He was awarded the Bronze Bauhinia Star by the SAR government in 2011.
