= Kwong Chi-kin =

- Traditional Chinese: 鄺志堅
- Simplified Chinese: 邝志坚
Transcriptions
Standard Mandarin
- Hanyu Pinyin: Kuàng Zhìjīan

Kwong Chi-kin (Chinese: 鄺志堅, born 15 February 1958 in Hong Kong) was the member of the Legislative Council of Hong Kong (Legco), representing labour industry. He graduated as a Bachelor of Social Sciences from the Chinese University of Hong Kong. He graduated as a Bachelor of Laws and Master of Laws from the University of London. He is now the legal adviser of the Hong Kong Federation of Trade Unions.

Legislative Council of Hong Kong
Preceded by Leung Fu-wah	Member of Legislative Council; Representative for Labour; 2004–2008; Served alongside: Li Fung-ying, Wong Kwok-hing	Succeeded by Ip Wai-ming
