= Mandy Tam =

Mandy Tam may refer to:

- Mandy Tam (politician) (born 1957), Hong Kong politician and former legislator
- Mandy Tam (actress) (born 2000), Hong Kong actress
