= Chan Wing-chan =

Chan Wing-chan 陳榮燦 BBS

Member of the Legislative Council
- In office 1 July 1998 – 30 June 2000
- Succeeded by: Leung Fu-wah
- Constituency: Labour
- In office 11 October 1995 – 30 June 1997
- Constituency: Hotels and Catering

Member of the Provisional Legislative Council
- In office 21 December 1996 – 30 June 1998

Personal details
- Born: 7 July 1935 (age 90) Jiangmen, Guangdong, China
- Party: Hong Kong Federation of Trade Unions; Democratic Alliance for the Betterment of Hong Kong
- Children: 2
- Occupation: Trade unionist

Chan Wing-chan, BBS (born 7 July 1935) was the member of the Legislative Council in 1991–95 for the Hotels and Catering and 1998–2000 for Labour and also Provisional Legislative Council (1996–98). He was born in Jiangmen, Guangdong, China.

Chan was the chairman of the Eating Establishment Employees General Union under the Hong Kong Federation of Trade Unions. He worked closely with Beijing before the handover of Hong Kong and joined the Selection Committee which oversaw the last phrase of the transition of sovereignty and elected the first Chief Executive and Provisional Legislative Council in 1996.

Legislative Council of Hong Kong
New parliament	Member of Provisional Legislative Council; 1997–1998	Replaced by Legislative Council
