= Wong Kwok-hing =

Hong Kong trade unionist and politician

Wong Kwok-hing BBS MH
- 王國興
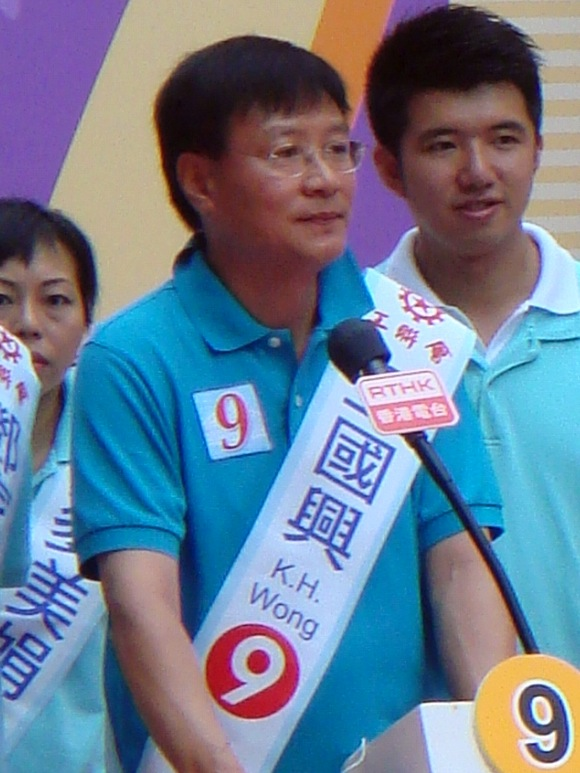

Member of the Legislative Council
- In office 1 October 2012 – 30 September 2016
- Preceded by: New seat
- Succeeded by: Kwok Wai-keung
- Constituency: Hong Kong Island
- In office 1 October 2008 – 30 September 2012
- Preceded by: Selina Chow
- Succeeded by: Alice Mak
- Constituency: New Territories West
- In office 1 October 2004 – 30 September 2008
- Preceded by: Chan Kwok-keung
- Succeeded by: Pan Pey-chyou
- Constituency: Labour

Personal details
- Born: 29 March 1949 (age 77) Haiphong, Tonkin, French Indochina
- Party: Hong Kong Federation of Trade Unions
- Other political affiliations: Democratic Alliance for the Betterment and Progress of Hong Kong (1992–2012)
- Education: Jinan University
- Occupation: Legislative Councillor; Trade unionists Politician

Wong Kwok-hing BBS MH (Chinese: 王國興, Vietnamese: Vương Quốc Hưng; born 29 March 1949, Haiphong, North Vietnam) is a Hong Kong trade unionist and a former member of the Legislative Council of Hong Kong, representing the New Territories West constituency from 2008 to 2012, and representing the Hong Kong Island from 2012 to 2016.

== Biography ==
Wong is a member of Hong Kong Federation of Trade Unions and was one of the 52 founding members of the Democratic Alliance for the Betterment and Progress of Hong Kong, which is the largest party and trade unions of the Pro-Beijing camp. He was previously a member of Eastern District Council for the Provident constituency.

Wong strongly opposed the filibuster, which was mostly led by four LegCo members of People Power and League of Social Democrats then. He wrote big words on the paper in the chamber to protest against them.

Political offices
Preceded by Chan Yuen-han	Member of the Eastern District Board; Representative for North Point North; 1991–1994	Constituency abolished
New constituency	Member of the Eastern District Council; Representative for Provident; 1994–2007	Succeeded by Kwok Wai-keung
New constituency	Member of the Urban Council; Representative for North Point East; 1995–1997	Replaced by Provisional Urban Council
New creation	Member of the Provisional Urban Council; 1997–1999	Council abolished
Preceded by Chan Oi-kwan	Member of the Eastern District Council; Representative for Siu Sai Wan; 2016–2019	Succeeded by Chan Wing-tai
Legislative Council of Hong Kong
Preceded by Chan Kwok-keung	Member of Legislative Council; Representative for Labour; 2004–2008; Served alongside: Li Fung-ying, Kwong Chi-kin	Succeeded by Pan Pey-chyou
Preceded by Selina Chow	Member of Legislative Council; Representative for New Territories West; 2008–2012	Succeeded by Alice Mak
New seat	Member of Legislative Council; Representative for Hong Kong Island; 2012–present	Succeeded by Kwok Wai-keung
Order of precedence
Preceded by Vincent Fang; Member of the Legislative Council	Hong Kong order of precedence Member of the Legislative Council	Succeeded by Joseph Lee; Member of the Legislative Council
