= Lee Kai-ming =

Hong Kong politician (1937–2022)

Lee Kai-ming 李啟明 GBS, SBS, JP

Member of the Legislative Council
- In office 1 July 1998 – 30 June 2000
- Succeeded by: Li Fung-ying
- Constituency: Labour
- In office 11 October 1995 – 30 June 1997
- Preceded by: Pang Chun-hoi
- Constituency: Labour

Member of the Provisional Legislative Council
- In office 21 December 1996 – 30 June 1998

Personal details
- Born: 11 October 1937 Guangzhou, China
- Died: 27 October 2022 (aged 85)
- Party: Federation of Hong Kong and Kowloon Labour Unions
- Children: 5
- Occupation: Trade unionist

Lee Kai-ming GBS SBS JP (11 October 1937 – 27 October 2022) was the member of the Legislative Council in 1991–95 and 1998–2000 for Labour, Provisional Legislative Council (1996–98). He was also the chairman of the Federation of Hong Kong and Kowloon Labour Unions from 1995 to 1999. He worked closely with Beijing before the handover of Hong Kong and joined the Hong Kong Basic Law Consultative Committee and Preparatory Committee for the Hong Kong Special Administrative Region which oversaw the last phrase of the transition of the sovereignty.

Legislative Council of Hong Kong
New parliament	Member of Provisional Legislative Council; 1997–1998	Replaced by Legislative Council
Order of precedence
Preceded by Tsang Tak-sing; Recipients of the Gold Bauhinia Star	Hong Kong order of precedence Recipients of the Gold Bauhinia Star	Succeeded by Paul Chow; Recipients of the Gold Bauhinia Star
