= Yeung Yiu-chung =

Hong Kong educator and politician (born 1951)

Yeung Yiu-chung, BBS, JP (born 1951 in Hong Kong) is a Hong Kong pro-Beijing educator and politician. He is the President of the Hong Kong Federation of Education Workers and the Hong Kong Deputy to National People's Congress of the People's Republic of China. He is also the member of The Democratic Alliance for the Betterment and Progress of Hong Kong. He now works as the Principal of Heung To School (Tin Shui Wai) in Tin Shui Wai, Yuen Long. He was a member of Legislative Council of Hong Kong from 1998 to 2004.

Yeung is a director of the Hong Kong Government funded National Education Services Centre, a private corporation promoting teaching materials on national culture to schools in Hong Kong which have attracted much criticism for their pro-Beijing bias.

== Link ==
- Official website of Yeung Yiu-chung

Legislative Council of Hong Kong
New parliament	Member of Provisional Legislative Council; 1997–1998	Replaced by Legislative Council
New parliament	Member of Legislative Council; Representative for Election Committee; 1998–2004	Constituency eliminated
