= Kwok Wai-keung =

Hong Kong politician

- 郭偉强
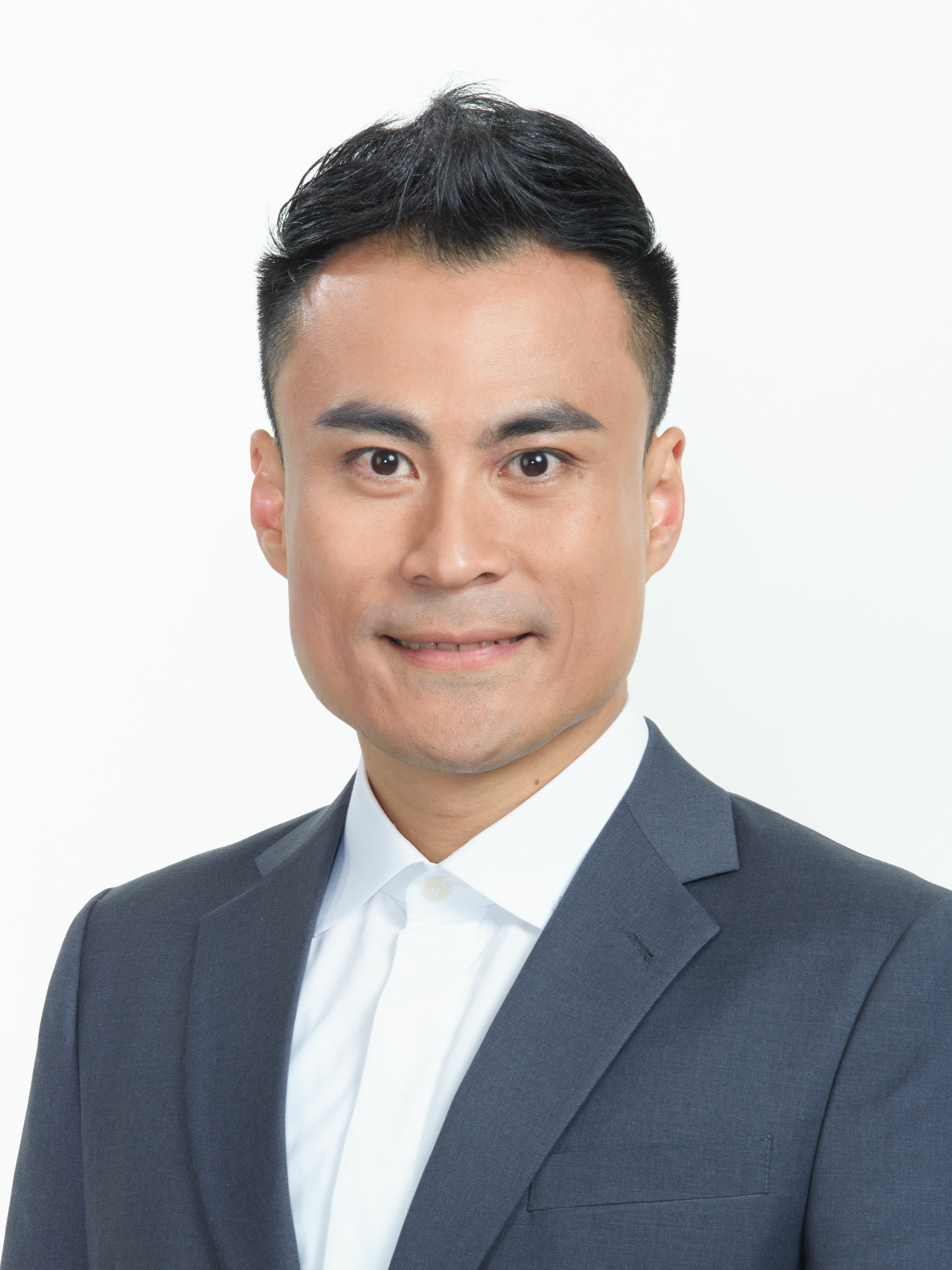
- Kwok in 2016

Member of the Legislative Council
- In office 1 January 2022 – 31 December 2025 Serving with Chau Siu-chung, Leung Tsz-wing
- Preceded by: Luk Chung-hung
- Constituency: Labour
- In office 1 October 2016 – 31 December 2021
- Preceded by: Wong Kwok-hing
- Succeeded by: Constituency abolished
- Constituency: Hong Kong Island
- In office 1 October 2012 – 30 September 2016
- Preceded by: Ip Wai-ming
- Succeeded by: Ho Kai-ming
- Constituency: Labour

Personal details
- Born: 15 April 1978 (age 48) Hong Kong
- Party: Hong Kong Federation of Trade Unions
- Education: Wah Yan College, Hong Kong; Hong Kong Polytechnic University; City University of Hong Kong
- Occupation: Legislative councillor Social worker

Aron Kwok Wai-keung (Chinese: 郭偉强) is a former member of the Legislative Council of Hong Kong, representing the Labour, which he was elected to in the 2012 LegCo election and 2021 LegCo election. Kwok is a member of the Hong Kong Federation of Trade Unions, the largest pro-Beijing labour union in the territory. He previously held the Hong Kong Island constituency, which he won in the 2016 LegCo election.

He is also a former district councillor for the Eastern District Council (Provident constituency).

On 27 March 2015, Kwok was appointed one of Housing Authority members for a two-year term, starting on 1 April.

== Early career ==
According to his Legislative Council biography, Kwok holds a diploma in social work and a Bachelor of Arts degree in social policy and administration, and is also a licensed social worker.

== Elections ==
=== Wong Tai Sin District Council ===
During the 2003 District Council elections, Kwok ran in Ching On constituency of Wong Tai Sin District Council, but was not elected.

=== Eastern District Council ===
Kwok ran for election in Provident constituency of the Eastern District Council during the 2007 District Council elections. He was elected with 2,527 votes. He ran uncontested during the 2011 election and 2015 election, retaining his seat by default.

He was reelected in the 2019 election with 3,229 votes, narrowly beating second-place candidate Duncann Chan by 48 votes.

=== Legislative Council ===
The pro-Beijing Federation of Trade Unions (FTU) selects members for two Legislative Council seats comprising the Labour functional constituency. Kwok, holding one of the FTU seats, was elected uncontested during the 2012 election.

During the 2016 LegCo election, he ran for a seat in the Hong Kong Island geographic constituency and was elected with 45,925 votes, or 12.2 per cent of the total votes cast.

== Political career ==
=== Disqualification of localist lawmakers ===
Kwok has advocated removing localist legislators from office. In November 2016, he urged the government to challenge the seat of Lau Siu-lai, who was elected during that year's election, on the basis that she read her swearing-in oath very slowly as a form of protest. The government later launched legal action against Lau and other democratically elected legislators, successfully removing them from office.

=== Attitude toward homeless people ===
In November 2017, Kwok was criticised by netizens and anti-poverty activists after expressing a callous attitude toward street sleepers. He made a post on his Facebook page boasting that a footbridge in his district (Provident constituency), on Tong Shui Road, had been cleared of homeless people (and their belongings) on 23 November 2017. The Facebook post included an animated GIF, displaying the clean-up, with the words "all clean". The footbridge was popular with street sleepers as it is redundant to a crosswalk at street level and therefore sees little foot traffic. An anti-poverty activist said that Kwok's post was reminiscent of the concurrent purge of Beijing's so-called "low-end population" that has drawn international attention.

In response to the controversy, Kwok responded that the street sleepers posed a health and safety issue, and that he had received complaints about the footbridge from his constituents. He stated that homeless people should stay in shelters or apply for public housing. In response to this, some social workers responded that shelters had time limits and did not constitute a long-term housing solution, and the process for acquiring a public housing unit is not easy.

=== Legislative Council assault allegation ===
On 8 May 2020, a meeting of the House Committee of the Legislative Council became chaotic due to controversy between the pro-democracy and pro-Beijing camps over the election of the new committee chair. Live footage filmed during the meeting by Radio Television Hong Kong showed Kwok grabbing Raymond Chan Chi-chuen by the collar and dragging him to the floor. Chan was sent to hospital, where he was diagnosed with a spinal disc herniation.

On 11 May, Chan announced that he had filed a report to the police, accusing Kwok of assault. Chan said he would also launch a crowdfunding campaign to fund private prosecution against Kwok, as he stated that he had little faith in the police nor the Department of Justice. Chan launched a crowdfunding campaign to pay for the prosecution, which exceeded its HK$1 million goal within hours. Kwok defended his actions, stating that he was trying to protect LegCo security guards. Chan launched a private prosecution against Kwok around three weeks after the encounter. On 6 November, Secretary for Justice intervened and halted the case in the hearing 3 days later.

=== Attitude toward LGBT community ===
On 22 November 2018, Kwok voted against a legislative motion that called for the government to explore legal unions for same-sex couples in Hong Kong. He was among the 27 lawmakers to oppose the motion, and this majority overruled the 24 favourable votes.

On 27 July 2020, Kwok faced criticism for ridiculing lawmaker Raymond Chan based on his sexual orientation. In a Facebook live broadcast, Kwok referred to Chan as "Mr. Chrysanthemum" and his advocates as "chrysanthemum groupies". The chrysanthemum flower is considered a common euphemism for anus in Cantonese lexicon. Chan condemned the derogatory terminology used to mock and discriminate against the gay community. LGBT singer Anthony Wong Yiu-ming stated that Kwok's stance represented outdated views on homosexuality from the pro-Beijing faction. Politician Tiffany Yuen was critical of Kwok's homophobic language and demanded an immediate apology. On the next day, Kwok continued his usage of "Mr. Chrysanthemum" in his live broadcast.

=== Driving while participating in LegCo video conference ===
On 14 January 2021, Kwok participated in a video conference of the Legislative Council's Panel on Housing, where he was suspected to have been driving while in the meeting, potentially violating the Road Traffic Ordinance.

=== Falsely claimed The Guardian is a paper for WHO ===
During the debate on the Motion of Thanks for Chief Executive's 2020 Policy Address on 21 January 2021, Kwok falsely claimed The Guardian (衛報) is a paper for WHO (世衛).

=== Birthday party ===
On 5 January 2022, Carrie Lam announced new warnings and restrictions against social gathering due to potential COVID-19 outbreaks. One day later, it was discovered that Kwok attended a birthday party hosted by Witman Hung Wai-man, with 222 guests. At least one guest tested positive with COVID-19, causing all guests to be quarantined. Kwok later claimed that the real issue was not the party, but the government's policy of allowing aircrew from Cathay Pacific to quarantine at home, saying "I wonder if society should be spending time chasing this party while ignoring the whole anti-epidemic loophole".

=== COVID-19 ===
In December 2022, Kwok was tested positive for COVID-19.

=== District Councils ===
In May 2023, after District Councils had a reduction in democratically elected seats, Kwok argued that the proposed restoration of appointed seats did not suggest a lack of trust in the public.

Political offices
Preceded by Wong Kwok-hing	Member of the Eastern District Council; Representative for Provident; 2007–2023	Succeeded by Constituency abolished
Legislative Council of Hong Kong
Preceded by Ip Wai-ming	Member of Legislative Council; Representative for Labour; 2012–2016	Succeeded by Ho Kai-ming
Preceded by Wong Kwok-hing	Member of Legislative Council; Representative for Hong Kong Island; 2016–2021	Constituency abolished
Preceded by Luk Chung-hung	Member of Legislative Council; Representative for Labour; 2022–2025; Served alongside: Chau Siu-chung, Leung Tsz-wing	Incumbent
Order of precedence
Preceded by Kwok Ka-ki; Member of the Legislative Council	Hong Kong order of precedence Member of the Legislative Council	Succeeded by Dennis Kwok; Member of the Legislative Council
