= Tam Yiu-chung =

Hong Kong politician

The Honourable Tam Yiu-chung GBM, JP
- 譚耀宗
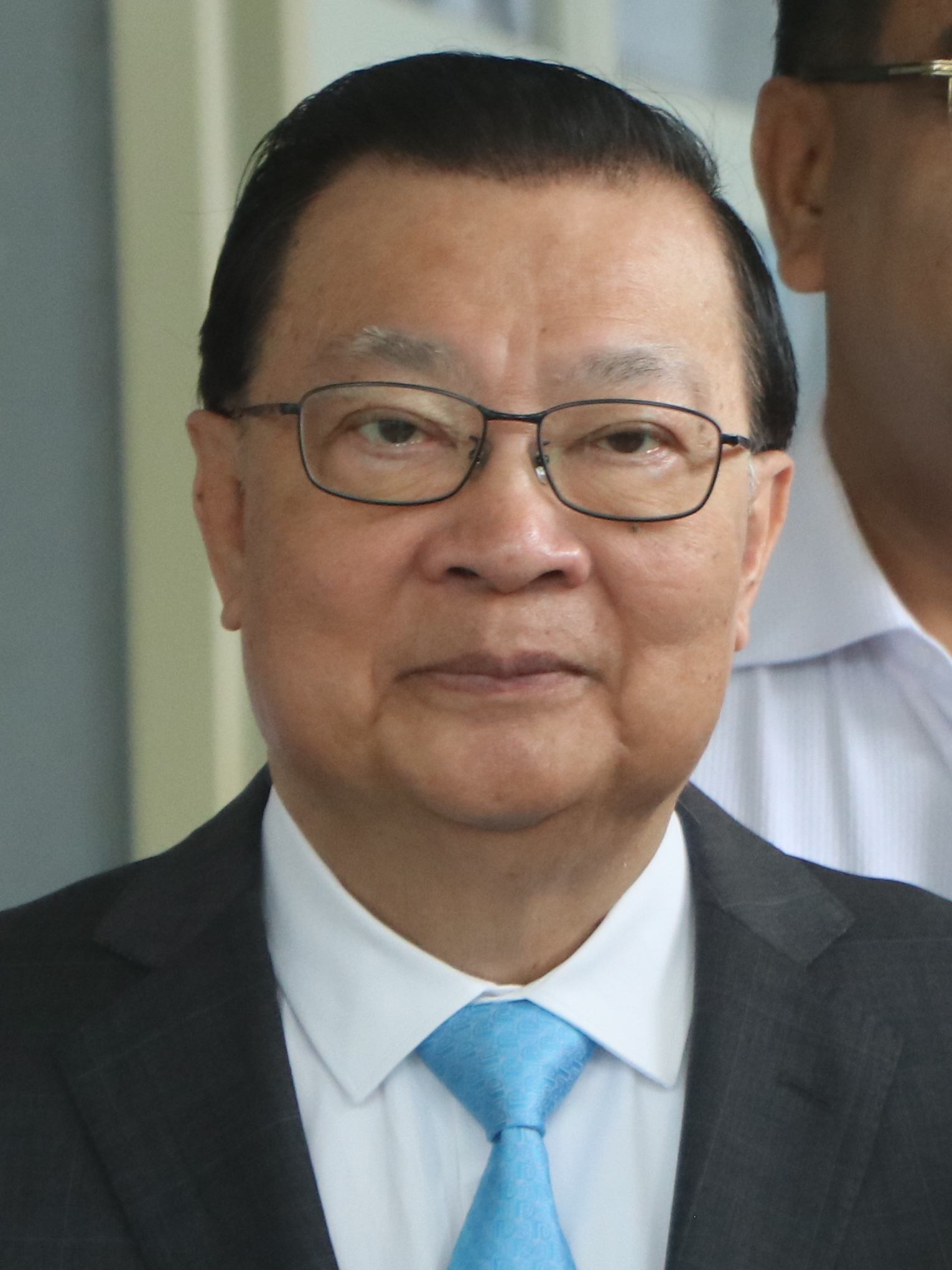
- Tam in 2025

Member of the Standing Committee of the National People's Congress
- In office 18 March 2018 – 11 March 2023
- Preceded by: Rita Fan
- Succeeded by: Starry Lee

Chairman of the Democratic Alliance for the Betterment and Progress of Hong Kong
- In office 28 August 2007 – 17 April 2015
- Preceded by: Ma Lik
- Succeeded by: Starry Lee

Non-official Member of the Executive Council
- In office 1997–2002
- Appointed by: Tung Chee-hwa
- Preceded by: New council

Member of the Legislative Council
- In office 30 October 1985 – 31 July 1995
- Preceded by: New constituency
- Succeeded by: Cheng Yiu-tong
- Constituency: Labour
- In office 21 December 1996 – 30 June 1998 (Provisional Legislative Council)
- Preceded by: New parliament
- Succeeded by: Parliament abolished
- In office 2 July 1998 – 30 September 2016
- Preceded by: New parliament
- Succeeded by: Eddie Chu
- Constituency: New Territories West

Personal details
- Born: 15 December 1949 (age 76) British Hong Kong
- Party: Democratic Alliance for the Betterment and Progress of Hong Kong (DAB)
- Other political affiliations: Hong Kong Federation of Trade Unions (FTU)
- Spouse: Lai Xiang-ming
- Education: Australian National University; London Metropolitan University
- Occupation: Legislative Councillor; Trade unionists Politician

Tam Yiu-chung
- Traditional Chinese: 譚耀宗
- Simplified Chinese: 谭耀宗
Transcriptions
Standard Mandarin
- Hanyu Pinyin: Tán Yaòzōng
Yue: Cantonese
- Jyutping: Taam^{4} Jiu^{6}zung^{1}

Tam Yiu-chung, GBM, JP (Chinese: 譚耀宗; born 15 December 1949) is a pro-Beijing politician in Hong Kong. He is a former member of the Standing Committee of the National People's Congress (NPCSC), former member of the Legislative Council of Hong Kong (LegCo) and former chairman of the pro-Beijing Democratic Alliance for the Betterment and Progress of Hong Kong (DAB).

A member of the traditional left-wing Hong Kong Federation of Trade Unions (FTU), Tam was a member of the Hong Kong Basic Law Drafting Committee (BLDC) and among the first elected members of the Legislative Council through the Labour functional constituency in 1985. He was the founding vice-chairman of the Democratic Alliance for the Betterment of Hong Kong formed in 1992 and its party chairman from 2007 to 2015.

He was elected to the Legislative Council of Hong Kong in New Territories West from 1998 until his retirement in 2016. A member of the National Committee of the Chinese People's Political Consultative Conference (CPPCC), Tam was elected to the National People's Congress in 2017 and succeeded Rita Fan to become the Hong Kong representative in the NPCSC. On 15 January 2021, the United States Department of the Treasury placed sanctions on six officials, including Tam, responsible for the mass arrests of pro-democratic activists on 6 January.

== Early career ==
Tam was born in a Hakka family of Huiyang ancestry in Hong Kong on 15 December 1949. In 1968, when he was a 19-year-old window display designer, he joined a retail union. He later rose to be the union's vice-chairman in 1975 and become one of the vice-chairman of the Hong Kong Federation of Trade Unions (FTU), the largest pro-Communist trade union in Hong Kong, with Cheng Yiu-tong in 1982.

After the Sino-British Joint Declaration finalised which determined the Chinese sovereignty of Hong Kong after 1997 in December 1984, Tam was appointed by the Beijing government to the Hong Kong Basic Law Drafting Committee (BLDC) which responsible for the drafting of the mini-constitution of Hong Kong after 1997 in February 1985. In September 1985, he was first elected to the Legislative Council of Hong Kong (LegCo) in the first ever Legislative Council election as one of the Labour representatives, along with Pang Chun-hoi, president of the pro-Kuomintang Hong Kong and Kowloon Trades Union Council (TUC).

During the Tiananmen Square protests of 1989, Tam and Cheng Yiu-tong joined the pro-democrats' demonstrations in support of the Tiananmen students. After the massacre on 4 June, he strongly condemned the Beijing authorities for the bloody suppression. However, he soon turned muted on the events with other pro-Beijing leftists. In 1992, he co-founded the pro-Beijing party the Democratic Alliance for the Betterment of Hong Kong (DAB) with other local pro-Communist leaders. He became the founding vice-chairman of the party.

In the 1995 Legislative Council elections, he gave up his Legislative Council seat in the Labour constituency to fight in Kowloon Southeast, one of 18 geographical constituencies elected by the public at large, but narrowly defeated by the Democratic Party candidate Fred Li Wah-ming, finishing a little over 2,000 votes behind.

== SAR Legislative Council ==
In 1996, he was elected to the Provisional Legislative Council tightly controlled by Beijing on the eve of the unification by the 400-strong Selection Committee. In the first SAR Legislative Council election, he was elected through the New Territories West.

In 1997, he was appointed by Chief Executive Tung Chee-hwa to the Executive Council which he served until 2002. He was also appointed chairman of the Elderly Commission from 1997 to 2005. In 1999, he was awarded the Gold Bauhinia Star (GBS) by the government.

After the 2003 District Council election the DAB's disastrous performance, the party chairman Tsang Yok-sing resigned from his office and succeeded by Ma Lik. He was re-elected to become the vice-chairman for the second time. In 2007, after being acting chairman for the preceding three weeks, he succeeded Ma Lik who died of cancer to become the party chairman.

Under his chairmanship, the DAB received electoral victories in the 2007 and 2011 District Council elections. In the 2012 Legislative Council election, he led the party to achieve the greatest victory in history, bagging 13 seats in total, by deploying two and three tickets in Hong Kong Island and New Territories West respectively and having all the tickets being elected except for Lau Kong-wah's ticket in District Council (Second).

In February 2015, he announced that he will step down as DAB chairman to open the door for a new generation of leaders. On 17 April 2015, Starry Lee succeeded Tam in the party's leadership election. He received Grand Bauhinia Medal (GBM), the highest award in the Hong Kong medal system, by the government on 1 July 2016.

== National People's Congress ==
He did not seek for re-election in the 2016 Legislative Council election along with three other party seniors Tsang Yok-sing, Ip Kwok-him and Chan Kam-lam.

Tam Yiu-chung had been also a Hong Kong deputy to the Chinese People's Political Consultative Conference (CPPCC) since 2003. In 2017, he switched from the CPPCC to run for the National People's Congress (NPC) and succeeded Rita Fan to be the Hong Kong representative in the Standing Committee of the National People's Congress (NPCSC).

In March 2018, he warned of the recent constitutional amendments in China meant Hongkongers who call for an end to "one-party dictatorship" in China, a slogan of the pro-democrats and one of the five pillars of the Hong Kong Alliance in Support of Patriotic Democratic Movements in China (HKASPDMC) might be disqualified from running for local office.

In the same month, Tam condemned Occupy Central co-founder Benny Tai for his remarks on the possibility of Hong Kong independence after the end of "dictatorship" in China. Tam urged Hong Kong to urgently implement Article 23 of the Basic Law to criminalise a series of acts including sedition, treason and subversion. He also asked if it was still appropriate for Tai to keep his job at HKU.

In October 2020, Tam said that discussions about Hong Kong independence should not be allowed in schools, and claimed it would violate the National Security Law.

In November 2020, Tam warned that pro-democracy lawmakers in the Legislative Council who were using filibustering techniques may be disqualified from their positions. In response, the pro-democracy lawmakers threatened to collectively quit if any of them were disqualified. Following the disqualification of the 4 lawmakers, Tam said that he strongly supported the decision.

In January 2021, following repeated calls from Tam to reform the judiciary, Chief Justice Geoffrey Ma said that the judiciary should not be reformed simply due to the pro-Beijing party being unhappy with the court's rulings.

In February 2021, Tam wrote that Hong Kong's political system needed reforming, and that the NPCSC was responsible for resolving issues that the Hong Kong could not fix by itself. Also in February, Tam linked the city with the CCP, asking "If you oppose the Chinese Communist Party, how can you maintain that you genuinely safeguard the interests of Hong Kong?"

In March 2021, Tam led the "Sign For HK 2021 campaign," which claimed to have collected 2.38 million signatures from those in Hong Kong in support of changes to only allow "patriots" to serve in the government. The deputy chief of the Hong Kong Public Opinion Research Institute (PORI) said he was skeptical of the authenticity of the signatures, and said that it was impossible to collect so many signatures in such a short time.

Also in March 2021, Tam suggested that pan-democrats could only blame themselves for the enacting of laws to ensure only "patriots" serve in the government. After the NPCSC passed legislation to allow only "patriots" to serve in the government, Tam claimed that Hong Kong could continue with democratic development after normality is restored.

In October 2021, Tam stated that "When the foreign powers invaded China in 1900, they looted and burned down the Old Summer Palace in today's Beijing. That's a historical fact and there's no alternative way to interpret it." However, the looting and burning of the palace happened in 1860, during the Second Opium War.

Though Tam had originally supported the 1989 Tiananmen Square protests, in 2021 he claimed that he did not know all of the facts, and when organizers of the annual Tiananmen vigil were arrested under the national security law, Tam said authorities were just following the law.

On 5 January 2022, Carrie Lam announced new warnings and restrictions against social gathering due to potential COVID-19 outbreaks. One day later, it was discovered that many government officials attended a birthday party hosted by Witman Hung Wai-man, with 222 guests. At least one guest tested positive with COVID-19, causing many guests to be quarantined. Tam later said that he saw no issues with the private party, and instead blamed the crew of Cathay Pacific, as well as Frank Chan Fan for allowing aircrew to quarantine at home. Tam also defended one guest, Caspar Tsui, and said that it was Tsui's job to meet with people from various sectors.

Tam tested positive for COVID-19 on 30 June 2022, and was unable to attend July 1 celebrations with CCP general secretary Xi Jinping.

In July 2022, Tam said that pro-democracy figures should not cut ties with the Chinese Communist Party.

In August 2022, after Nancy Pelosi visited Taiwan and John Lee vowed "The Hong Kong government would fully support and facilitate all necessary measures by Beijing to safeguard national sovereignty and territorial integrity," Tam said Hong Kong did not have much decision-making power and that "It depends on what Beijing wants us to do."

In November 2022, Tam said he would not run for the next NPCSC election, and that he was proud of his previous work on the national security law, as well as electoral reforms.

In November 2022, Tam said that if Hong Kong courts allow Jimmy Lai to use a UK-based lawyer, the NPCSC would need to step in to block the use of foreign lawyers and clear any misunderstandings about the national security law; Tam also denied that he was influencing the court's decision. In contrast, Ronny Tong said that it was inappropriate to comment on cases before rulings were issued. Professor Johannes Chan Man-mun, former law dean of HKU, said that the NPCSC interpretation "may severely compromise Hong Kong as an international city," and that calls to have the NPCSC intervene before the court had issued its decision were "disturbing" and could undermine the rule of law and judicial independence in the city.

Tam earlier said that the only way to resolve the issue was to have the NPCSC intervene; in December 2022, Tam backtracked and claimed "I've never insisted on an interpretation." Tam also later claimed that "it would be best" if Hong Kong could handle the issue without the NPCSC. In January 2023, after the NPCSC ruled that the Chief Executive could ban foreign lawyers, Tam said that changing Hong Kong law to align it with the national security law would have no impact on the legal system, and would only bring benefits.

In December 2022, Tam said that defendants charged under the national security law could have their trials in mainland China if they cannot find a lawyer in Hong Kong.

In January 2023, Tam said that all foreign lawyers should be banned from national security cases, and that "It is clearer to draw a line in the sand by ruling out foreign lawyers from taking part in national security cases as it is difficult to tell whether the case involves state secrets in the first place."

== Personal life ==
Tam studied Adult Education at Australian National University and Trade Union Studies at the London Metropolitan University. He is married with two sons. His sons are Australian citizens and hold Australian passports.

Legislative Council of Hong Kong
New constituency	Member of Legislative Council; Representative for Labour; 1985–1995; Served alongside: Pang Chun-hoi	Succeeded by Cheng Yiu-tong
New parliament	Member of Provisional Legislative Council; 1997–1998	Replaced by Legislative Council
New parliament	Member of Legislative Council; Representative for New Territories West; 1998–2016	Succeeded by Eddie Chu
Preceded by Emily Lau	Chairman of Finance Committee; 2007–2008	Succeeded by Emily Lau
Political offices
New title	Non-official Member of Executive Council; 1997–2002	Succeeded by Tsang Yok-sing
Party political offices
Preceded by Ma Lik	Chairman of Democratic Alliance for the Betterment and Progress of Hong Kong; 2007–2015	Succeeded by Starry Lee
National People's Congress
Preceded by Rita Fan	Member of Standing Committee; Representative for Hong Kong SAR; 2018–2023	Succeeded by Starry Lee
Order of precedence
Preceded by Li Dak-sum; Recipients of the Grand Bauhinia Medal	Hong Kong order of precedence Recipients of the Grand Bauhinia Medal	Succeeded by Chan Wing-kee; Recipients of the Grand Bauhinia Medal
