= Lui Ming-wah =

Hong Kong politician

Lui Ming Wah, SBS, JP (呂明華, born 8 April 1938 in Weihai, Shandong, China) was the member of the Legislative Council of Hong Kong (Legco), representing industrial (second) industry in functional constituencies seats. He was the member of the Alliance in Legco.

Lui is a businessman and a registered engineer. He founded and is chair of the Hong Kong Shandong Business Association.

Legislative Council of Hong Kong
New parliament	Member of Legislative Council; Representative for Industrial; 1998–2008	Succeeded by Lam Tai-fai
