= Chan Kwok-keung =

Chan Kwok-keung 陳國強 JP

Member of the Legislative Council
- In office 1 July 1998 – 30 September 2004
- Succeeded by: Wong Kwok-hing
- Constituency: Labour

Personal details
- Born: 17 January 1946 (age 80) Huizhou, Guangdong, China
- Party: Democratic Alliance for Betterment of Hong Kong; Hong Kong Federation of Trade Unions
- Spouse: Leung Yim-ming
- Children: 2

Chan Kwok-keung (born 17 January 1946, in Huizhou, Guangdong, China) was the member of the Legislative Council of Hong Kong in 1998–2004 for the Labour constituency. He was the vice-chairman of the Hong Kong Wearing Apparel Industry Employees' General Union, under the pro-Beijing Hong Kong Federation of Trade Unions. He is also the member of the Democratic Alliance for Betterment of Hong Kong.
