= Labour (constituency) =

Functional constituency of Hong Kong

Labour 勞工界
- Functional constituency for the Legislative Council of Hong Kong
- Region: Hong Kong
- Electorate: 881

Current constituency
- Created: 1985
- Number of members: Three
- Members: Chau Siu-chung (FLU); Lam Wai-kong (FTU); Lee Kwong-yu (FTU)

The Labour functional constituency (Chinese: 勞工界功能界別) is a functional constituency in the elections for the Legislative Council of Hong Kong. It was one of the 12 functional constituency seats created for the 1985 Legislative Council election. It corresponds to the Labour Subsector in the Election Committee. The constituency is composed of 697 bodies that are trade unions of which all the voting members are employees.

The constituency composed of two seats when it first created by in 1985 as two of the 12 original functional constituency seats. It was held by the two largest labour unions at that time, the pro-Communist Hong Kong Federation of Trade Unions (FTU) and pro-Nationalist Hong Kong and Kowloon Trades Union Council (TUC). Since 1998, the constituency composed of three seats, two occupied by the FTU and one occupied by the Federation of Hong Kong and Kowloon Labour Unions (FLU), both pro-Beijing.

== Members elected ==
Election	Member	Party	Member	Party		
1985	Pang Chun-hoi	TUC	Tam Yiu-chung	FTU		
1988	Pang Chun-hoi	TUC	Tam Yiu-chung	FTU		
1991	Pang Chun-hoi	TUC	Tam Yiu-chung	FTU		
1995	Lee Kai-ming	FLU	Cheng Yiu-tong	FTU		
Not represented in PLC (1997–98)
1998	Lee Kai-ming	FLU	Chan Wing-chan	DAB	Chan Kwok-keung	FTU
2000	Li Fung-ying	FLU	Leung Fu-wah	FTU	Chan Kwok-keung	DAB
2004	Li Fung-ying	FLU	Kwong Chi-kin	FTU	Wong Kwok-hing	FTU
2008	Li Fung-ying	FLU	Ip Wai-ming	FTU	Pan Pey-chyou	FTU
2012	Poon Siu-ping	FLU	Kwok Wai-keung	FTU	Tang Ka-piu	FTU
2016	Poon Siu-ping	FLU	Ho Kai-ming	FTU	Luk Chung-hung	FTU
2021	Chau Siu-chung	FLU	Kwok Wai-keung	FTU	Dennis Leung	FTU
2025	Chau Siu-chung	FLU	Lam Wai-kong	FTU	Lee Kwong-yu	FTU

== Electoral results ==
The plurality-at-large voting system is used and the elected candidates are shown in bold.

=== 2020s ===
2025 Legislative Council election: Labour
Party	Candidate	Votes	%	±%
**FLU**	**Chau Siu-chung**	**521**		
**FTU**	**Lam Wai-kong**	**506**		
**FTU**	**Lee Kwong-yu**	**485**		
SSA	Tam Kam-lin	297		
FTU	So Pak-tsan	281		
Total valid votes				
Rejected ballots				
Turnout		783	88.88	
Registered electors		881		
FLU **hold**		Swing		
FTU **hold**		Swing		
FTU **hold**		Swing		

2021 Legislative Council election: Labour
Party	Candidate	Votes	%	±%
**FTU**	**Kwok Wai-keung**	**398**		
**FTU**	**Dennis Leung Tsz-wing**	**373**		
**FLU**	**Chau Siu-chung**	**371**		
Nonpartisan	Lee Kwong-yu	116		
Total valid votes				
Rejected ballots				
Turnout		488	73.72	
Registered electors		697		
FTU **hold**		Swing		
FTU **hold**		Swing		
FLU **hold**		Swing		

=== 2010s ===
2016 Legislative Council election: Labour
Party	Candidate	Votes	%	±%
**FLU**	**Poon Siu-ping**	**Unopposed**		
**FTU**	**Ho Kai-ming**	**Unopposed**		
**FTU**	**Luk Chung-hung**	**Unopposed**		
Registered electors		668		
FLU **hold**		Swing		
FTU **hold**		Swing		
FTU **hold**		Swing		

2012 Legislative Council election: Labour
Party	Candidate	Votes	%	±%
**FTU**	**Kwok Wai-keung**	**Unopposed**		
**FTU**	**Tang Ka-piu**	**Unopposed**		
**FLU**	**Poon Siu-ping**	**Unopposed**		
Registered electors		646		
FTU **hold**		Swing		
FTU **hold**		Swing		
FLU **hold**		Swing		

=== 2000s ===
2008 Legislative Council election: Labour
Party	Candidate	Votes	%	±%
**Nonpartisan (FLU)**	**Li Fung-ying**	**Unopposed**		
**FTU**	**Ip Wai-ming**	**Unopposed**		
**FTU**	**Pan Pey-chyou**	**Unopposed**		
Registered electors		596		
FLU **hold**		Swing		
FTU **hold**		Swing		
FTU **hold**		Swing		

2004 Legislative Council election: Labour
Party	Candidate	Votes	%	±%
**Nonpartisan (FLU)**	**Li Fung-ying**	**322**	**32.43**	
**FTU**	**Kwong Chi-kin**	**288**	**29.00**	
**FTU (DAB)**	**Wong Kwok-hing**	**278**	**27.80**	
Nonpartisan	Chan Kwok-keung	105	10.57	
Turnout		461	88.82	
Registered electors		519		
FLU **hold**		Swing		
FTU **hold**		Swing		
FTU **hold**		Swing		

2000 Legislative Council election: Labour
Party	Candidate	Votes	%	±%
**Nonpartisan (FLU)**	**Li Fung-ying**	**283**	**32.53**	
**Nonpartisan (FTU)**	**Leung Fu-wah**	**259**	**29.77**	
**DAB**	**Chan Kwok-keung**	**226**	**25.98**	
TUC	Leung Suet-fong	102	11.72	
Turnout		380	91.13	
Registered electors		417		
Nonpartisan **gain** from Nonpartisan		Swing		
Nonpartisan **gain** from Nonpartisan		Swing		
DAB **hold**		Swing		

=== 1990s ===
1998 Legislative Council election: Labour
Party	Candidate	Votes	%	±%
**Nonpartisan (FLU)**	**Lee Kai-ming**	**212**	**27.32**	
**DAB**	**Chan Wing-chan**	**212**	**27.32**	
**Nonpartisan (FTU)**	**Chan Kwok-keung**	**204**	**26.29**	
Nonpartisan (TUC)	Chan Yun-che	99	12.76	
Nonpartisan	Ng Yat-wah	49	6.31	
Turnout		339	93.91	
Registered electors		361		
Nonpartisan **hold**		Swing		
DAB **gain** from Nonpartisan		Swing		
Nonpartisan **win** (new seat)				

1995 Legislative Council election: Labour
Party	Candidate	Votes	%	±%
**FTU**	**Cheng Yiu-tong**	**684**	**43.07**	
**Nonpartisan (FLU)**	**Lee Kai-ming**	**533**	**33.56**	
TUC	Lee Kwok-keung	262	16.50	
Independent	Luk Wun-cheung	109	6.86	
Turnout		1,080	91.60	
Registered electors		1,179		
FTU **hold**		Swing		
FLU **gain** from TUC		Swing		

1991 Legislative Council election: Labour
Party	Candidate	Votes	%	±%
**TUC**	**Pang Chun-hoi**	**Unopposed**		
**FTU**	**Tam Yiu-chung**	**Unopposed**		
Registered electors		378		
TUC **hold**		Swing		
FTU **hold**		Swing		

=== 1980s ===
1988 Legislative Council election: Labour
Party	Candidate	Votes	%	±%
**TUC**	**Pang Chun-hoi**	**Unopposed**		
**FTU**	**Tam Yiu-chung**	**Unopposed**		
TUC **hold**		Swing		
FTU **hold**		Swing		

1985 Legislative Council election: Labour
Party	Candidate	Votes	%	±%
**TUC**	**Pang Chun-hoi**	**Unopposed**		
**FTU**	**Tam Yiu-chung**	**Unopposed**		
TUC **hold**		Swing		
FTU **hold**		Swing		
