= Federation of Hong Kong and Kowloon Labour Unions =

Federation of Hong Kong and Kowloon Labour Unions 港九勞工社團聯會
- Abbreviation: FLU
- Chairman: Lam Chun-sing
- Founded: November 1984
- Headquarters: 2/F, Fook Yiu Building, 6–8 Tai Po Road, Sham Shui Po, Kowloon
- Membership: 60,000
- Ideology: Labourism
- Regional affiliation: Pro-Beijing camp
- Colours: Green
- Legislative Council: 2 / 90
- District Councils: 3 / 470

Website
- www.hkflu.org.hk

Federation of Hong Kong and Kowloon Labour Unions
- Traditional Chinese: 港九勞工社團聯會
Transcriptions
Yue: Cantonese
- Yale Romanization: Góng gáu lòuh gūng séh tyùhn lyùhn wuih
- Jyutping: Gong^{2} gau^{2} lou^{4} gung^{1} se^{5} tyun^{4} lyun^{4} wui^{6*2}

Alternative Chinese name
- Traditional Chinese: 勞聯
Transcriptions
Yue: Cantonese
- Yale Romanization: Lòuh lyùhn
- Jyutping: Lou^{4} lyun^{4}

The Federation of Hong Kong and Kowloon Labour Unions (HKFLU), established in 1984, is the second largest trade union in Hong Kong, after the Hong Kong Federation of Trade Unions, having 82 trade unions and more than 60,000 members in total. The federation was established in 1984.

== History ==
The FLU was established in November 1984 by 15,000 members, 13 trade unions and 4 labour organisations. It remained fairly neutral between the two major trade unions, the pro-Taiwan right-wing Hong Kong and Kowloon Trades Union Council (TUC) and pro-Beijing left-wing Hong Kong Federation of Trade Unions (FTU).

During the transition period of the transfer of sovereignty over Hong Kong from the United Kingdom to People's Republic of China, the head of the Federation, Lee Kai-ming, was invited by Beijing to the Hong Kong Basic Law Consultative Committee, which was responsible for the drafts of Hong Kong Basic Law, the mini-constitution after 1997. Lee was elected as the member of the Legislative Council in 1995, along with Cheng Yiu-tong of the FTU, representing the Labour constituency. In 1996, Lee was member of the Preparatory Committee for the SAR and the Provisional Legislative Council (PLC), the interim legislature controlled by the Beijing government.

After the handover, the FLU retained one seat in the Labour constituency of the Legislative Council. Li Fung-ying, the then vice-chairman of the Federation was LegCo member until her retirement in 2012. She was succeeded by Poon Siu-ping who served until 2021. Chau Siu-chung is the FLU's current representative in the LegCo.

In April 2023, the FLU failed to gain police approval for a Labour Day march.

== Electoral performance ==
=== Legislative Council elections ===
Election	Number of popular votes	% of popular votes	GC seats	FC seats	EC seats	Total seats	+/−	Position
1995	–	–	0	1	0	1 / 60	1▲	5th▲
1998	–	–	0	1	0	1 / 60	–	6th
2000	–	–	0	1	0	1 / 60	0	7th
2004	–	–	0	1		1 / 60	0	6th▲
2008	–	–	0	1		1 / 60	0	7th▲
2012	–	–	0	1		1 / 70	0	10th▼
2016	–	–	0	1		1 / 70	0	10th▲
2021	–	–	0	1	1	2 / 90	1▲	6th▲
2025	–	–	0	1	1	2 / 90	0	6th

=== District Council elections ===
Election	Number of popular votes	% of popular votes	D.E. seats	E.C. seats	App. seats	Total elected seats	+/−
2003	–	–	1		0	1 / 400	0
2007	1,339	0.12	1		0	1 / 405	0
2011	1,859▲	0.16▲	1		0	1 / 412	0
2015	3,168▲	0.22▲	1			1 / 431	0
2019	1,734▼	0.06▼	0			0 / 452	1▼
2023	12,436▲	1.06▲	0	1	2	3 / 470	3▲

== See also ==
- United Front Work Department
- United Front (China)
