= Medal of Honour (Hong Kong) =

Medal of Honour 榮譽勳章
- Image of the medal
- Awarded for: community service in a district or in a particular area for a long period of time or for distinctive service by a member of the civil service
- Presented by: Hong Kong
- Post-nominals: MH
- Established: 1997
- First award: 1998

Precedence
- Next (higher): Meritorious Service Medals
- Next (lower): CE's Commendation for Community Service; CE's Commendation for Government and Public Service

The Medal of Honour (Chinese: 榮譽勳章; MH) is part of the honours system in Hong Kong. It was created in 1997 to replace the British honours system after the transfer of sovereignty to the People's Republic of China and the establishment of Hong Kong Special Administrative Region. The Medal of Honour is the entry level award under the Hong Kong honours system and is awarded for community service in a district or in a particular area for a long period of time. It may also be awarded to civil servants for serving with distinction.

This medal essentially replaced the Order of the British Empire prior to 1 July 1997.
