= 2012 Hong Kong legislative election =

- 9 September 2012

All 70 seats to the Legislative Council 36 seats needed for a majority
- Opinion polls
- Registered: 3,466,201 (GC) ▲2.79%
- Turnout: 1,838,722 (53.05%) ▲7.85pp
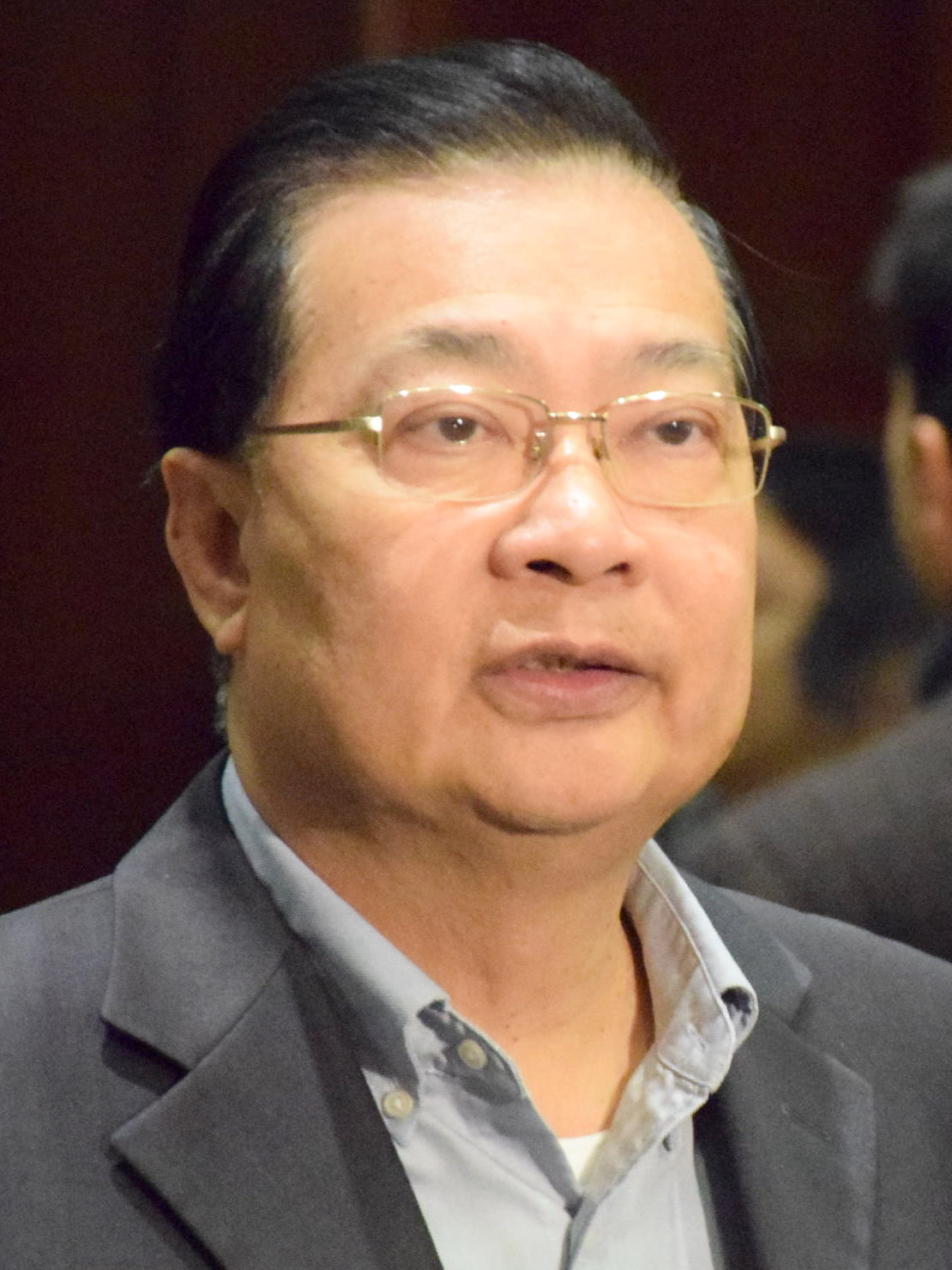

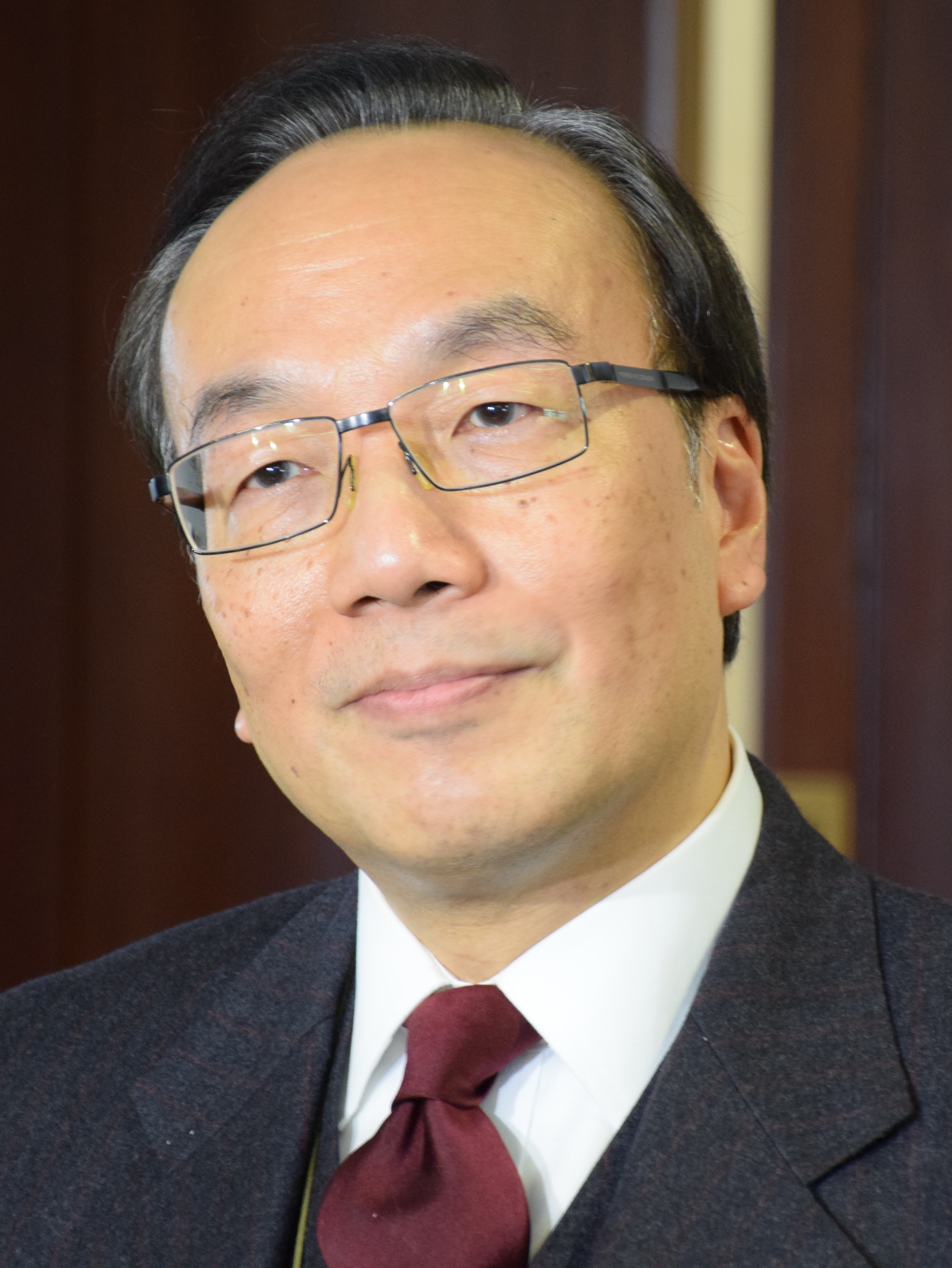

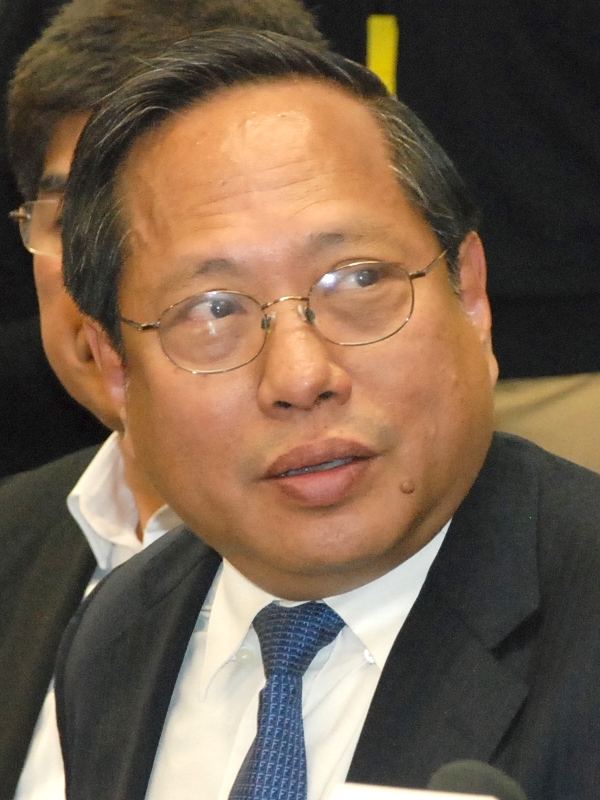

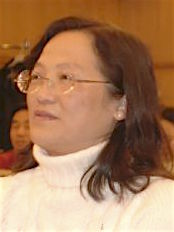

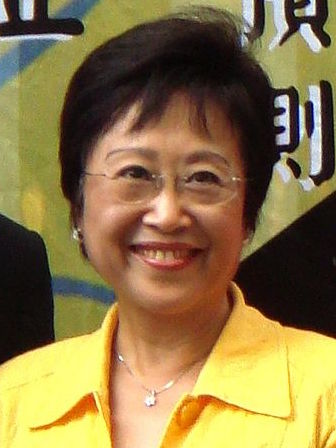

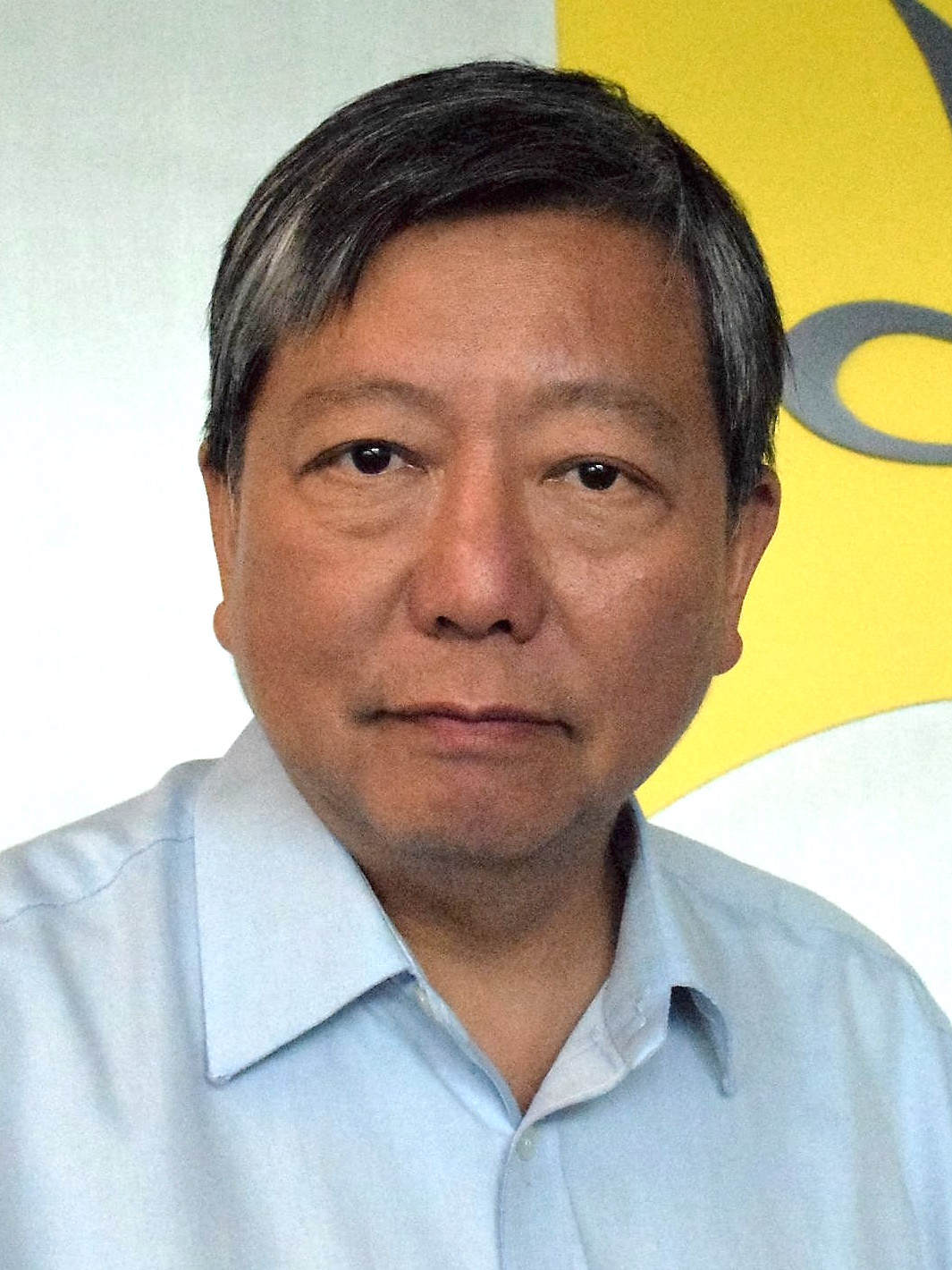

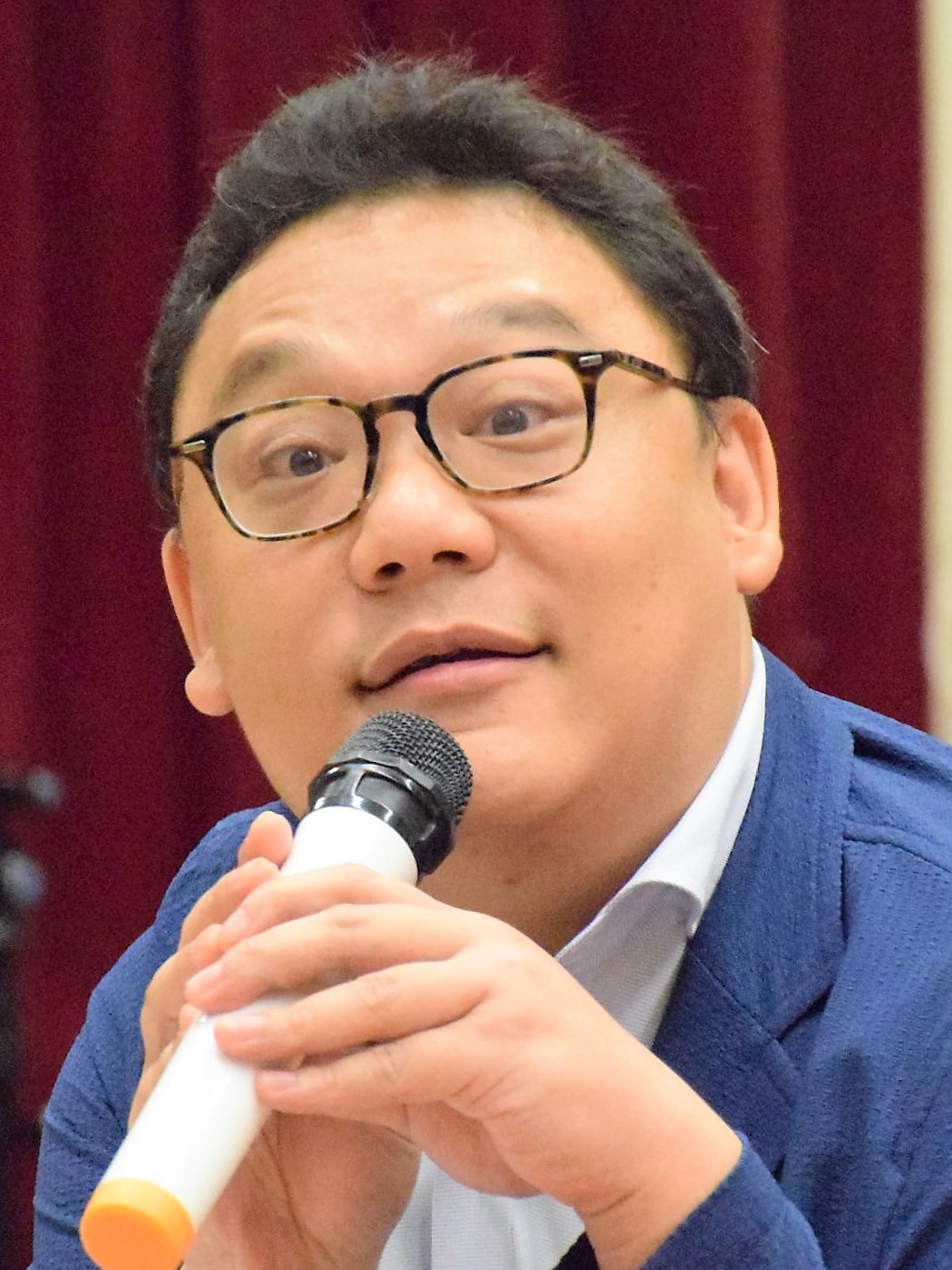

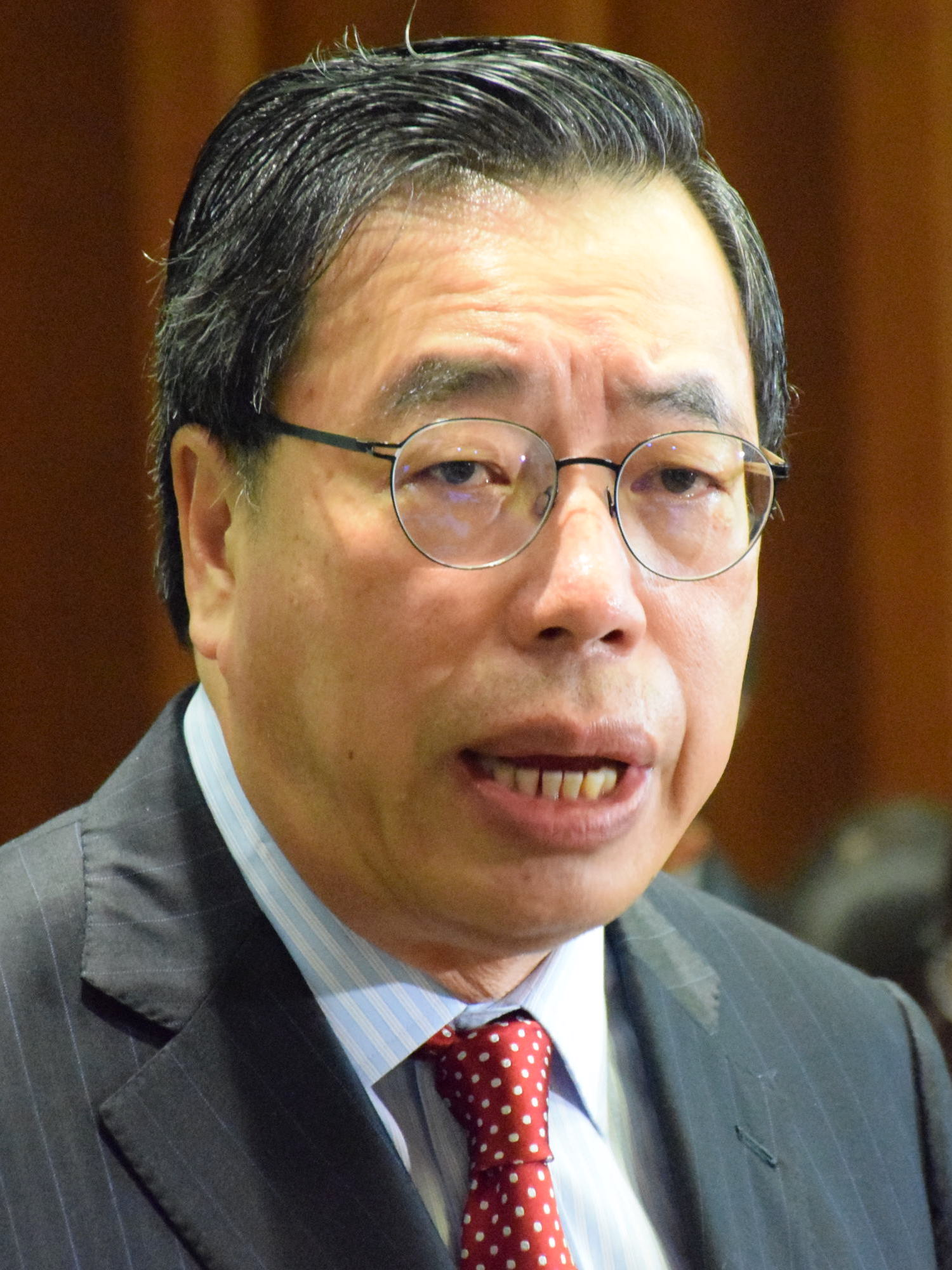

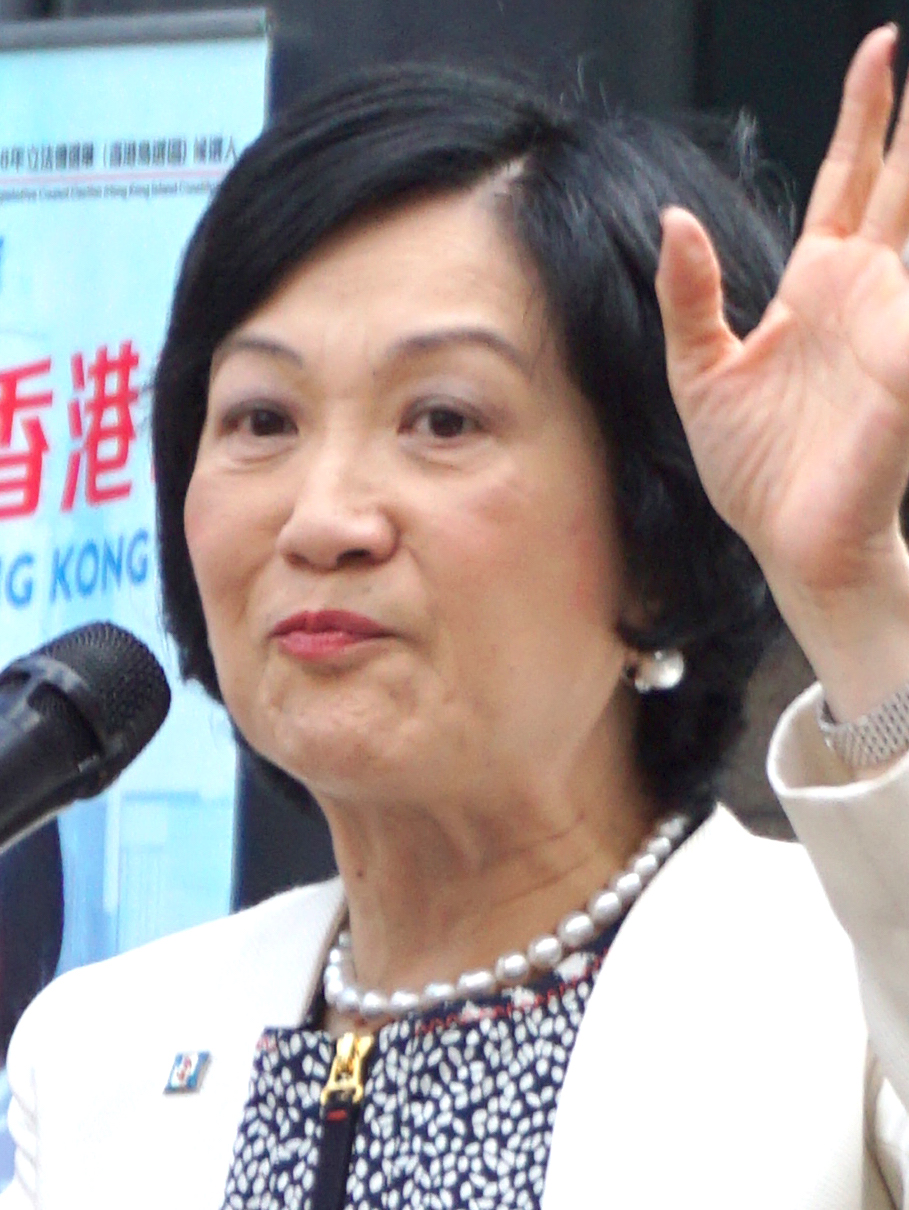
	First party	Second party	Third party
Leader	Tam Yiu-chung	Alan Leong	Albert Ho
Party	DAB	Civic	Democratic
Alliance	Pro-Beijing	Pan-democracy	Pan-democracy
Leader's seat	New Territories West	Kowloon East	District Council (Second)
Last election	10 seats, 22.92%	5 seats, 13.66%	8 seats, 20.63%
Seats won	13	6	6
Seat change	▲3	▲1	▼2
Popular vote	366,140	255,007	247,220
Percentage	20.22%	14.08%	13.65%
Swing	▼2.70pp	▲0.42pp	▼6.98pp
	Fourth party	Fifth party	Sixth party
Leader	Lam Shuk-yee	Miriam Lau	Lee Cheuk-yan
Party	FTU	Liberal	Labour
Alliance	Pro-Beijing	Pro-Beijing	Pan-democracy
Leader's seat	Did not stand	Hong Kong Island (defeated)	New Territories West
Last election	4 seats, 5.70%	7 seats, 4.33%	New party
Seats won	6	5	4
Seat change	▲2	▲2	▲1
Popular vote	127,857	48,702	112,140
Percentage	7.06%	2.64%	6.19%
Swing	▲1.36pp	▼1.64pp	N/A
	Seventh party	Eighth party	Ninth party
Leader	Christopher Lau	Andrew Leung and others	Regina Ip
Party	People Power	Economic Synergy	NPP
Alliance	Pan-democracy	Pro-Beijing	Pro-Beijing
Leader's seat	Hong Kong Island (defeated)	Industrial (First)	Hong Kong Island
Last election	New party	New party	New party
Seats won	3	3	2
Seat change	▲1	▼1	▲1
Popular vote	176,250	5,717	68,097
Percentage	9.73%	0.32%	3.76%
Swing	N/A	N/A	N/A
Party control before election
Pro-Beijing camp
Party control after election
Pro-Beijing camp

The 2012 Hong Kong Legislative Council election was held on 9 September 2012 for the 5th Legislative Council (LegCo) since the establishment of the Hong Kong Special Administrative Region.

The election was for the new total of 70 seats in LegCo, ten more than previously, with 35 members elected in geographical constituencies through direct elections, and 35 members in functional constituencies. Under new arrangements agreed in a contentious LegCo vote in 2010, five District Council (Second) functional constituency seats each represent all 18 District Councils of Hong Kong voted for by all resident voters in Hong Kong (who did not have a vote in any other functional constituency), effectively increasing the number of seats elected with universal suffrage to 40.

The pro-Beijing camp scored a major success, maintaining its dominance in the functional constituencies and winning 17 of the 35, nearly half, of the geographical constituency seats, which were considered to be the stronghold of the pan-democracy camp. The Democratic Alliance for the Betterment and Progress of Hong Kong (DAB), the flagship Beijing-loyalist party, won 13 seats in total, more than double the tally of either the pro-democracy Democratic Party or Civic Party, or of its sister organisation, the Hong Kong Federation of Trade Unions (FTU), which each won six seats.

The Democratic Party, the flagship pro-democracy party, suffered the worst defeat since its creation in 1994, winning only six seats and lost all its seats in the New Territories West, while the radical democrats League of Social Democrats and the newly formed People Power doubled their total votes. Despite the addition of five new geographical constituency seats, the pan-democrats won one seat fewer than in the 2008 election; infighting within the camp was blamed. The Civic Party failed in their election strategy as two of their incumbents, Audrey Eu and Tanya Chan, placed second on the lists in Hong Kong Island and New Territories West both received over 70,000 votes, far more than other lists, but still unable to get re-elected.

The pro-business Liberal Party's chairwoman Miriam Lau failed to gain a seat in Hong Kong Island, winning the least seats in party history although James Tien regained his seat in New Territories East. Both Miriam Lau from the Liberals and Albert Ho from the Democrats resigned their seats as chairs after the defeat.

The pan-democracy and pro-Beijing camps both placed three lists in contest of the five new District Council (Second) functional constituency seats. Three of them went to the Democrats, Albert Ho and James To and Frederick Fung from the Association for Democracy and People's Livelihood (ADPL). The Beijing-loyalists could only win two seats with FTU's Chan Yuen-han and DAB's Starry Lee each getting one seat. Veteran Lau Kong-wah became the only DAB candidate who was placed first on a candidate list but lost in the election.

== Eligibility ==
=== Right to vote ===
As at 9 September 2012, a person has the right to vote in a Legislative Council election if he/she fulfils all of the below criteria :

- Hong Kong permanent resident (regardless of nationality),
- ordinarily resides in Hong Kong,
- holds a Hong Kong identity card or another identity document,
- has registered to vote on or before 16 May 2012,
- aged 18 or above on 25 July 2012,
- not a member of any armed forces nor found to be incapable under the Mental Health Ordinance (Cap. 136), by reason of mental incapacity, of managing and administering his/her property and affairs.

=== Right to stand ===
To stand as a candidate in a geographical constituency, a person must fulfil all of the below criteria:

- a Hong Kong permanent resident with Chinese citizenship,
- does not have any foreign citizenship nor the right of abode in any country outside China,
- aged 21 or above on the date of nomination,
- a registered voter on the date of nomination,
- has ordinarily resided in Hong Kong for the 3 years immediately preceding the date of nomination,
- not a member of any national, regional or municipal legislature, assembly or council of any place outside Hong Kong, other than a people's congress or people's consultative body of the People's Republic of China, whether established at the national or local level,
- not a member of any armed forces nor found to be incapable under the Mental Health Ordinance (Cap. 136), by reason of mental incapacity, of managing and administering his/her property and affairs,
- submits a nomination form to the returning officer on or before 31 July 2012.

== New structure of the Legislative Council ==
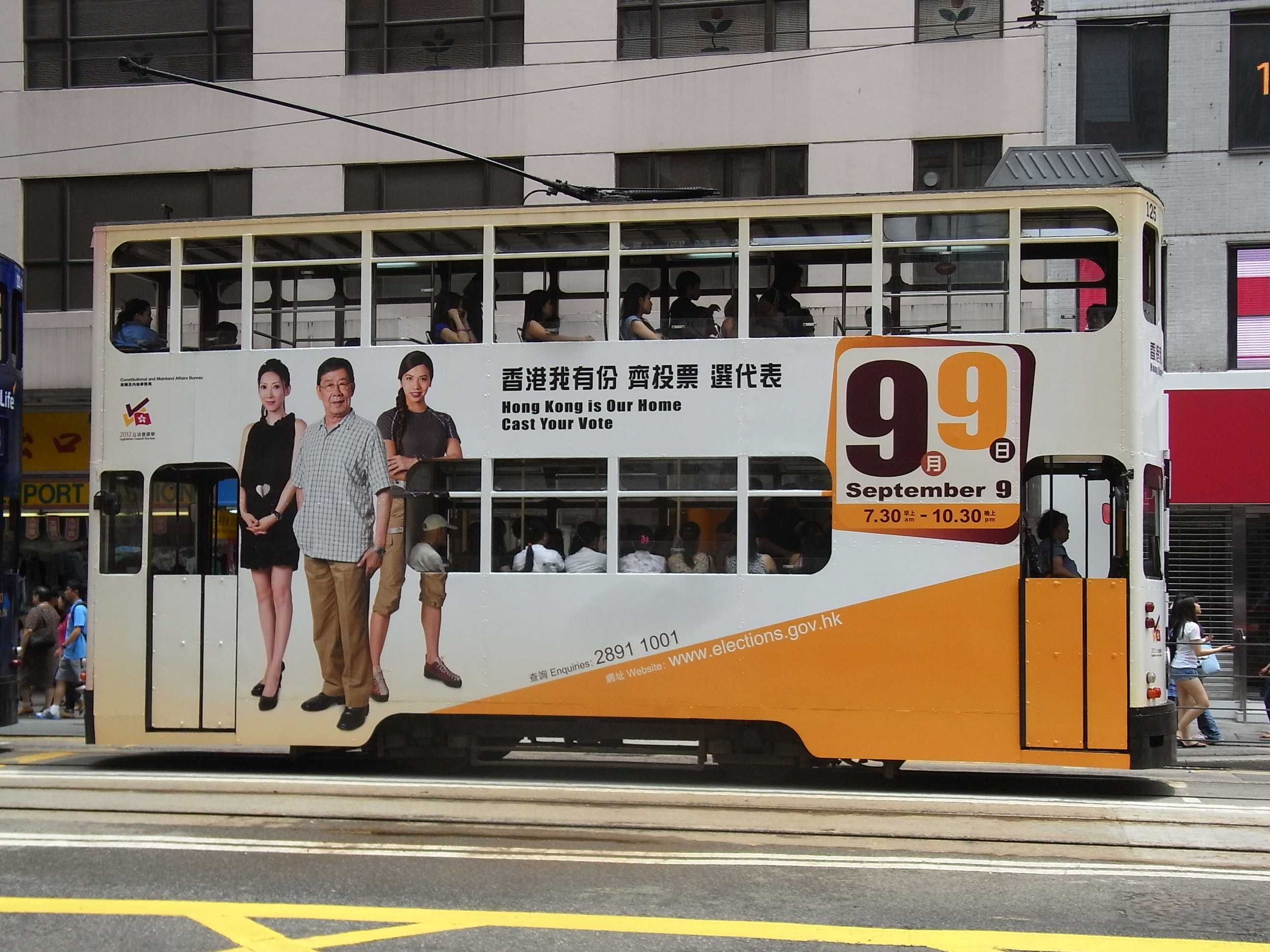
An electoral advertisement on a tram

=== Geographical constituencies ===
Under the constitutional reform package passed in 2010, this election saw LegCo increase its total size from 60 seats to 70 seats, half of which are geographical constituencies (GCs) and half functional constituencies (FCs). The GC seats are returned by universal suffrage, with the Kowloon West constituency once again returning five seats, while the Hong Kong Island, Kowloon East, and New Territories West constituencies each gain one new seat and New Territories East, the second largest constituency, gaining two extra seats. The election uses a system of party-list proportional representation, with seats allocated by the largest remainder method using the Hare quota as the quota for election.

Geographical constituencies	No. of seats		
Geographical constituencies	2008	2012	Change
Hong Kong Island	6	7	+1
Kowloon West	5	5	±0
Kowloon East	4	5	+1
New Territories West	8	9	+1
New Territories East	7	9	+2
Total	30	35	+5

=== Functional constituencies ===
While the electoral methods in the 30 'traditional' FC seats remain unchanged, the five new seats form a new constituency called the District Council, for which candidates may be nominated by the District councillors and are elected by all registered voters who are not in any 'traditional' FC, creating the largest constituency with a total of more than 3.2 million eligible electors. The vote counting system used is the same as that in the GCs: the party-list proportional representation with the largest remainder method and Hare quota.

== Retiring incumbents ==
Thirteen incumbents chose not to run for re-election. Paul Chan's Accountancy seat was vacant since 29 July 2012 and Chim Pui-chung withdrew his nomination on 27 July 2012.

Constituency	Departing incumbents	Party
Hong Kong Island	Kam Nai-wai	Democratic
Kowloon East	Fred Li Wah-ming	Democratic
New Territories West	Cheung Hok-ming	DAB
New Territories East	Andrew Cheng Kar-foo	Independent
Agriculture and Fisheries	Wong Yung-kan	DAB
Legal	Margaret Ng Ngoi-yee	Civic
Accountancy	Paul Chan Mo-po	Independent
Labour	Li Fung-ying	FLU
Commercial (Second)	Philip Wong Yu-hong	Nonpartisan
Finance	David Li Kwok-po	Nonpartisan
Financial Services	Chim Pui-chung	Nonpartisan
Sports, Performing Arts, Culture and Publication	Timothy Fok Tsun-ting	Nonpartisan
Textiles and Garment	Sophie Leung Lau Yau-fun	Economic Synergy

== Pre-election issues ==
=== New leadership under Leung Chun-ying ===
As Leung Chun-ying sworn in on 1 July, he sought a foothold in the Legislative Council against his defeated rival, Henry Tang. The Tang supporter for the Financial Services functional constituency, Chim Pui-chung, decided to withdraw his nomination for re-election on 27 July, while Christopher Cheung Wah-fung, who voted for CY Leung and was also a member of the Chinese People's Political Consultative Conference, decided to run in the constituency.

Other Leung's supporters including Martin Liao Cheung-kong, Ng Leung-sing and Ma Fung-kwok also ran in other functional constituencies, replacing the original pro-Tang legislators Philip Wong, David Li and Timothy Fok.

On the day CY Leung assumed the Chief Executive, there were about 400,000 participants in the July 1 marches, the biggest anti-government rally in recent history.

=== Moral and National Education controversy ===
Moral and civic education was one of the four key tasks in the 2001 curriculum reform undertaken by the Education and Manpower Bureau (superseded by the Education Bureau in 2007), and its framework was revised by the Education Bureau in 2008. On 13 October 2010, Chief Executive Donald Tsang stated in the "Policy Address 2010–2011" that moral and national education would replace MCE to "strengthen national education". The government planned to introduce the new subject in primary schools in 2012 and secondary schools in 2013.

In July 2012, the "Civil Alliance Against the National Education" (民間反對國民教育科大聯盟) was formed. On 29 July 2012, 30 organisations protested in a march. According to the organisers, more than 90,000 protesters, including many parents with their children, participated in the march.

Members of the student activist group Scholarism (學民思潮) began their occupation of the Hong Kong government headquarters on 30 August 2012. Fifty members occupied the public park beneath the government offices, of which three began a hunger strike. The goal of the protest was, expressly, to force the government to retract its plans to introduce Moral and National Education as a compulsory subject. The initial planned length of the occupation was three days. On 3 September 2012 the Civil Alliance Against National Education announced that they would continue their occupation of the government headquarters indefinitely. On 7 September, up to 120,000 people attended a demonstration outside the government headquarters; police said there were 36,000 attendees at 9:30 pm.

Following opposition from the public, the government postponed the commencement of the subject by introducing a three-year trial run period, such that the schools were allowed to commence the latest in 2015.

== Opinion polling ==
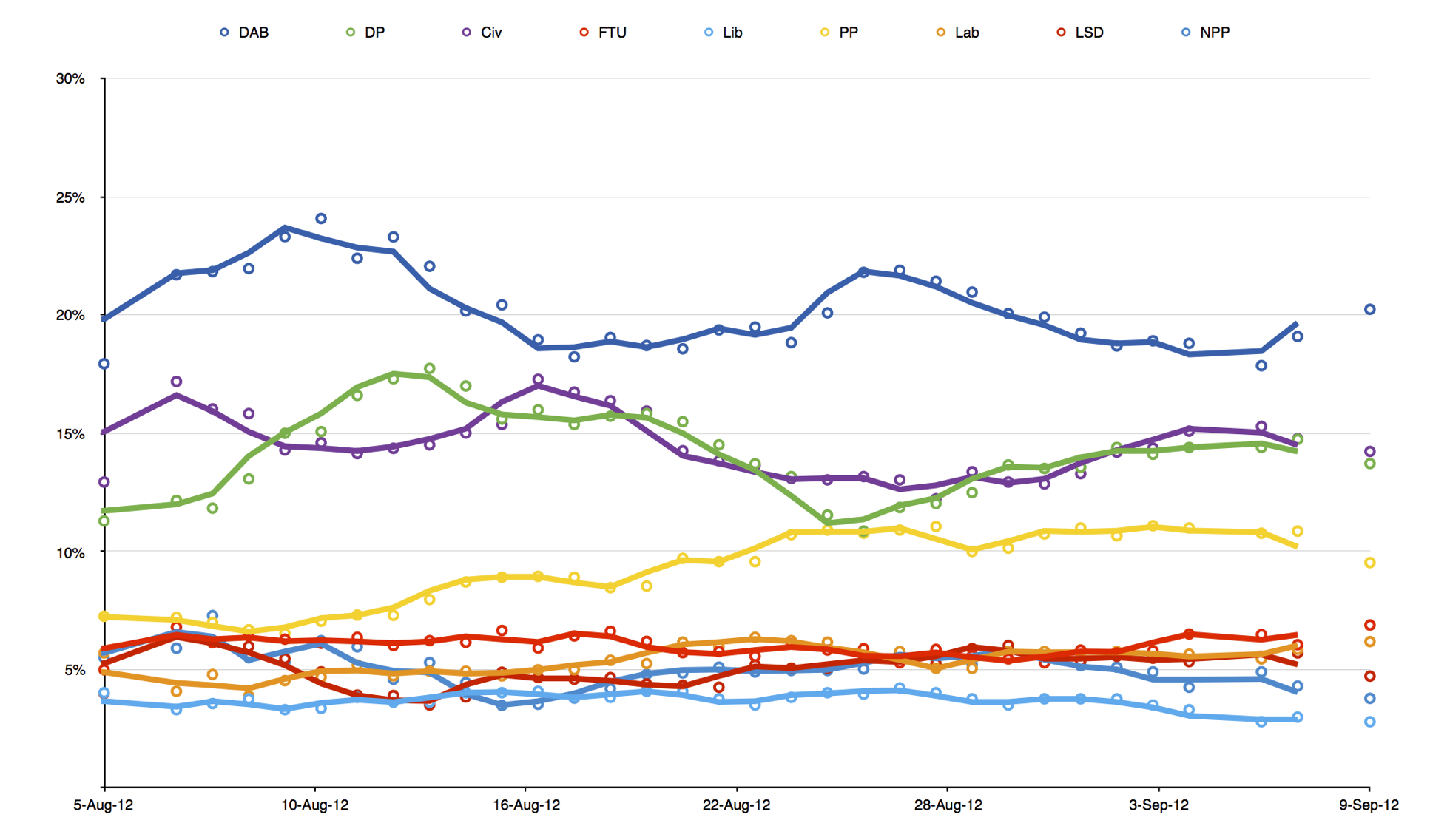
DAB Democratic Civic FTU Liberal People Power Labour LSD NPP

== Results ==
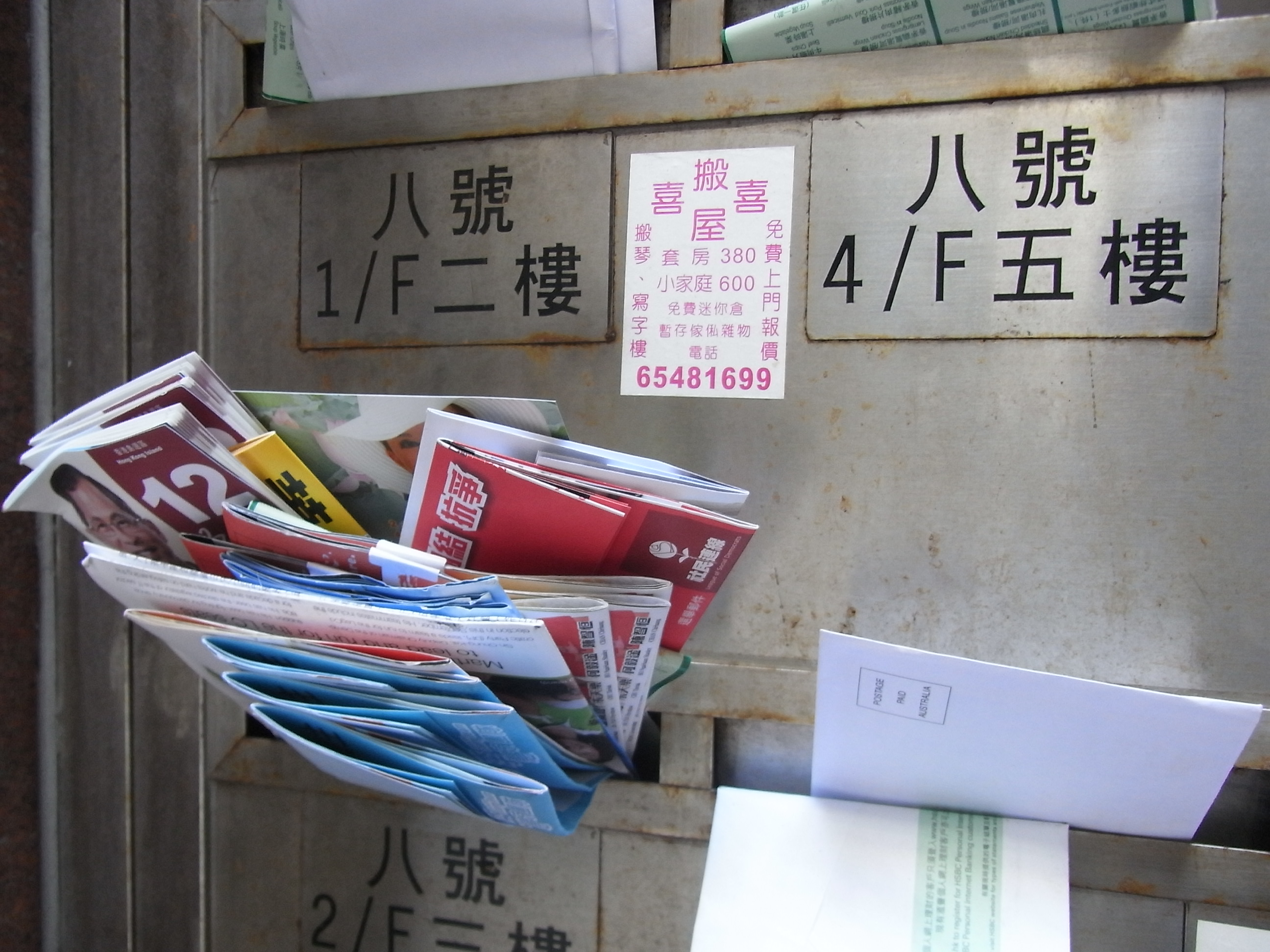
Leaflets of the Hong Kong Island candidates in a mailbox in Central.

The election was marked with the record of 287 candidates. 67 lists with a total of 216 candidates contested the 35 geographical constituencies, while 53 candidates contested in the traditional functional constituencies, in which 16 of them returned to LegCo uncontested.

The largest pro-democracy party, the Democratic Party, suffered the largest defeat since its creation in 1994, while the radical democrats League of Social Democrats and the newly formed People Power doubled their votes. Despite the addition of five new geographical constituency seats, the pan-democrats won one seat fewer than in the 2008 poll; infighting within the camp was blamed. Audrey Eu and Tanya Chan, the incumbent Civic Party legislators, placed second on the lists in Hong Kong Island and New Territories West both received over 70,000 votes, far more than other lists, but still were not re-elected. (see 2012 Hong Kong legislative election in Hong Kong Island and New Territories West)

The Beijing-loyalist Democratic Alliance for the Betterment and Progress of Hong Kong remained the largest party, winning 13 seats in total. All the lists in the geographical constituencies were elected as they split their candidates into several lists to avoid wasting votes under the largest remainder method. Christopher Chung revealed the DAB, of which he is a member, had secretly engaged in illegally allocating votes with the FTU based on the results of the party's own exit polling results; he said that both he and Jasper Tsang switched over to campaigning for the Wong Kwok-hing of the FTU at around 6 pm, after the DAB had reached their quota of vote.

Following the election, Albert Ho, resigned as leader of the Democratic Party, citing failure to present a united front for the pan-democratic camp, failure to retain seats from the previous elections, and infighting between pro-democracy parties. Miriam Lau, the leader of the Liberal Party, also resigned as leader, citing her failure to win a seat in this election and a need for new leadership in the party.

Nine of the 16 uncontested functional constituency seats went to the Liberal Party, Economic Synergy and nonpartisan Lam Tai-fai from the "Tang camp", who are mostly the business and commercial sectors.

Leung's supporters took several seats in the functional constituencies. Pro-Leung Lo Wai-kwok defeated incumbent Raymond Ho Chung-tai who nominated Henry Tang in the CE election and pro-democrat Albert Lai in the Engineering sector. In Tourism, Architectural, Surveying and Planning and Sports, Performing Arts, Culture and Publication constituencies, Yiu Si-wing, Tony Tse Wai-chuen and Ma Fung-kwok were also elected. Leung's backers Ng Leung-sing and Martin Liao Cheung-kong won seats unopposed to the finance and Commercial (Second) functional constituencies respectively.

The acting president of the Hong Kong Professional Teachers' Union Ip Kin-yuen and Civic Party Dennis Kwok retained their seats in the traditionally pro-democracy Education and Legal sectors. Cheung Kwok-che of the Labour Party and nonpartisan Joseph Lee Kok-long also secured their seats in the Social Welfare and Health Services constituencies. In addition, the pan democrats gained two more seats in Information Technology and Accountancy with newcomers Charles Mok and Kenneth Leung.

The pan-democrats won three out of five seats in the new District Council (Second) functional constituency with Albert Ho and James To from the Democratic Party and Frederick Fung from the Association for Democracy and People's Livelihood. The Beijing loyalists could only won two seats with Chan Yuen-han of Hong Kong Federation of Trade Unions (FTU) and Starry Lee of the Democratic Alliance for the Betterment of Hong Kong (DAB) each got one seat. Veteran Lau Kong-wah became the only DAB candidate who was placed first on a candidate list but lost in the election (see 2012 Hong Kong legislative election in District Council).

=== Election results overall ===
Result by parties and camps

Before election:

↓
23	37
Pro-democracy	Pro-Beijing

Change in composition:

↓
27	43
Pro-democracy	Pro-Beijing

Summary of the 9 September 2012 Legislative Council of Hong Kong election results
Political affiliation	Geographical Constituencies				Traditional Functional Constituencies				District Council (Second) FC			Total seats	±
Political affiliation	Votes	%	±pp	Seats	Votes	%	±pp	Seats	Votes	%	Seats	Total seats	±
DAB (Note: Note: the votes gained by Lau Kong-wah who represents both DAB and Civil Force banner is counted into DAB in this table.)	366,140	20.22	▼2.70	9	105	0.07	▼0.14	3	476,875	29.96	1	13	▲3
FTU	127,857	7.06	▲1.36	3	-	-	-	2	246,196	15.47	1	6	▲2
Liberal	48,702	2.69	▼1.64	1	1,076	0.76	▼2.58	4	-	-	-	5	▲2
Economic Synergy	5,717	0.32	N/A	0	-	-	-	3	-	-	-	3	▼1
NPP	68,097	3.76	N/A	2	-	-	-	-	-	-	-	2	▲1
KWND	34,548	1.91	N/A	1	-	-	-	-	-	-	-	1	0
New Forum (Note: Note: the votes gained by Scarlett Pong who represents both Civil Force and New Century Forum is counted into Civil Force in this table.)	-	-	-	-	1,106	0.78	N/A	1	-	-	-	1	▲1
FLU	-	-	-	-	-	-	-	1	-	-	-	1	0
Civil Force	23,988	1.32	N/A	0	-	-	-	-	-	-	-	0	0
Third Force	16,767	0.93	N/A	0	-	-	-	-	-	-	-	0	0
Pro-Beijing Independents	80,671	4.45	-	1	44,529	31.36	N/A	10	61,321	3.85	0	11	▲2
Total for pro-Beijing camp	772,487	42.66	▲2.91	17	46,816	32.97	▲1.91	24	784,392	49.28	2	43	▲6
Civic	255,007	14.08	▲0.42	5	4,480	3.15	▼4.36	1	-	-	-	6	▲1
Democratic	247,220	13.65	▼6.98	4	1,464	1.03	▼1.80	0	545,308	34.26	2	6	▼2
Labour	112,140	6.19	N/A	3	9,078	6.39	N/A	1	-	-	-	4	▲1
People Power	176,250	9.73	N/A	3	-	-	-	-	-	-	-	3	▲1
LSD	87,997	4.86	▼5.26	1	-	-	-	-	-	-	-	1	0
NWSC	43,799	2.42	▼0.38	1	-	-	-	-	-	-	-	1	0
ADPL	30,634	1.69	▼1.10	0	-	-	-	-	262,172	16.47	1	1	0
Neo Democrats	28,621	1.58	N/A	1	-	-	-	-	-	-	-	1	▲1
PTU	-	-	-	-	46,535	32.77	▼1.80	1	-	-	-	1	0
Democratic Alliance	2,896	0.16	N/A	0	-	-	-	-	-	-	-	0	0
Independent democrats	33,988	1.87	-	0	26,892	18.94	N/A	3	-	-	-	3	-
Total for pan-democrats	1,018,552	56.24	▼3.26	18	88,449	62.28	▲1.66	6	807,480	50.73	3	27	▲4
Non-aligned others	19,945	1.10	-	0	2,205	1.55	▼6.77	0	-	-	0	0	-
Total	1,810,984	100.00		35	142,011	100.00		30	1,591,872	100.00	5	70	
Valid votes	1,810,984	98.49	▼0.93		142,011	93.97	▼1.59		1,591,872	95.16			
Invalid votes	27,738	1.51	▲0.93		9,113	6.03	▲1.59		80,921	4.84			
Vote cast / turnout	1,838,722	53.05	▲7.85		151,124	69.65	▲9.35		1,672,793	51.95			
Registered voters	3,466,201	100.00	▲2.79		216,979	100.00	▲2.24		3,219,755	100.00			

=== Election results by Geographical Constituency ===
Constituency	Elected members
Hong Kong Island	
Kowloon West	
Kowloon East	
New Territories West	
New Territories East	

=== Votes gained by each party by districts ===
District	Pro-Beijing						Pan-democrats						
District					Oth.	Total						Oth.	Total
District	DAB	FTU	NPP	LP	Oth.	Total	Civic	DP	PP	Lab	LSD	Oth.	Total
Central and Western	22.75	9.06	9.06	5.60	0.57	44.18	21.85	13.80	4.96	9.39	0.85	4.75	55.60
Wan Chai	21.80	5.02	10.94	6.79	0.57	45.11	23.11	12.22	5.11	8.84	0.73	4.79	54.81
Eastern	20.78	9.38	8.66	5.40	1.24	45.46	21.26	11.19	5.85	9.79	1.05	5.82	54.42
Southern	21.14	8.63	9.64	4.41	0.50	44.32	20.21	13.60	5.91	9.32	0.93	5.60	55.57
Hong Kong Island	21.29	8.26	9.16	5.35	0.90	44.96	21.31	12.26	5.64	9.53	0.96	5.21	54.91
Yau Tsim Mong	22.71	–	–	–	16.08	38.78	17.96	18.10	16.75	–	–	7.89	60.69
Sham Shui Po	19.12	–	–	–	14.40	33.53	14.88	11.90	16.68	–	–	22.68	66.12
Kowloon City	20.20	–	–	–	18.88	39.08	16.76	17.49	16.49	–	–	9.89	60.63
Kowloon West	20.41	-	-	-	16.50	36.91	16.34	15.52	16.62	-	-	13.20	62.72
Wong Tai Sin	13.37	16.97	–	–	11.59	41.92	14.06	17.52	12.91	–	9.96	2.51	56.97
Kwun Tong	19.04	12.42	–	–	14.95	46.41	15.05	13.80	12.82	–	9.29	1.47	52.42
Kowloon East	16.65	14.34	-	-	13.54	44.52	14.63	15.37	12.86	-	9.57	1.91	54.33
Tsuen Wan	23.20	5.04	11.75	–	1.92	41.91	20.43	10.03	8.72	5.92	1.56	8.90	55.55
Tuen Mun	22.63	7.78	6.43	–	5.66	42.50	14.36	13.65	9.47	9.18	1.98	6.50	55.15
Yuen Long	25.84	5.87	7.40	–	8.35	47.45	12.43	8.87	9.31	10.10	2.05	7.05	49.81
Kwai Tsing	19.28	8.27	6.84	–	4.60	38.98	12.40	14.38	8.09	7.22	1.80	15.14	59.02
Islands	25.40	9.26	5.59	–	6.38	46.64	17.46	9.47	8.77	6.42	1.61	6.96	50.69
New Territories West	22.83	7.07	7.58	-	5.53	43.01	14.48	11.77	8.90	8.22	1.86	9.36	54.58
North	26.13	5.87	–	8.22	4.02	44.24	4.58	17.21	8.82	8.36	11.17	4.86	55.00
Tai Po	21.10	5.07	–	6.56	7.39	40.11	7.20	12.58	9.19	9.32	10.62	10.37	59.27
Sai Kung	15.72	5.39	–	4.80	19.57	45.49	6.92	12.40	7.34	6.46	9.60	11.25	53.97
Sha Tin	16.54	5.02	–	7.23	11.86	40.64	8.08	15.92	8.01	9.54	10.46	6.46	58.47
New Territories East	18.75	5.26	-	6.67	11.68	42.36	7.05	14.67	8.19	8.53	10.39	8.08	56.90
Total	20.22	7.06	3.76	2.69	8.93	42.66	14.08	13.65	9.73	6.19	4.86	7.90	56.24

Popular votes by District Council constituency. Red represents Pro-Beijing camp gained most votes and green the Pro-democracy camp. Pro-Beijing remained stronghold in the rural areas in Ha Tsuen, Pat Heung, Sai Kung District, Sha Tau Kok, Ta Kwu Ling and Lamma Island. Some urban areas in Mid-Levels, North Point, Chai Wan, Wong Tai Sin, Sau Mau Ping, Yau Tong and Shek Wai Kok showed more support for the Pro-Beijing camp. Pro-democracy camp grabbed majority of the votes in the rest areas.

The election showed large swings in Mid-Levels areas in Hong Kong Island and New Territories West, particularly in Tsuen Wan, Tuen Mun, Kwai Tsing, Tin Shui Wai, and Tseung Kwan O in New Territories East, but the rural areas as well as urban areas in Sheung Shui, Tai Po, Sha Tin and Wong Tai Sin showed a small swing back to the pro-democrats.

Results of the 2012 LegCo election geographical constituencies: the party with most votes in each District Council Constituency.

Results of the 2012 LegCo election District Council (second) functional constituency.

=== Votes summary ===
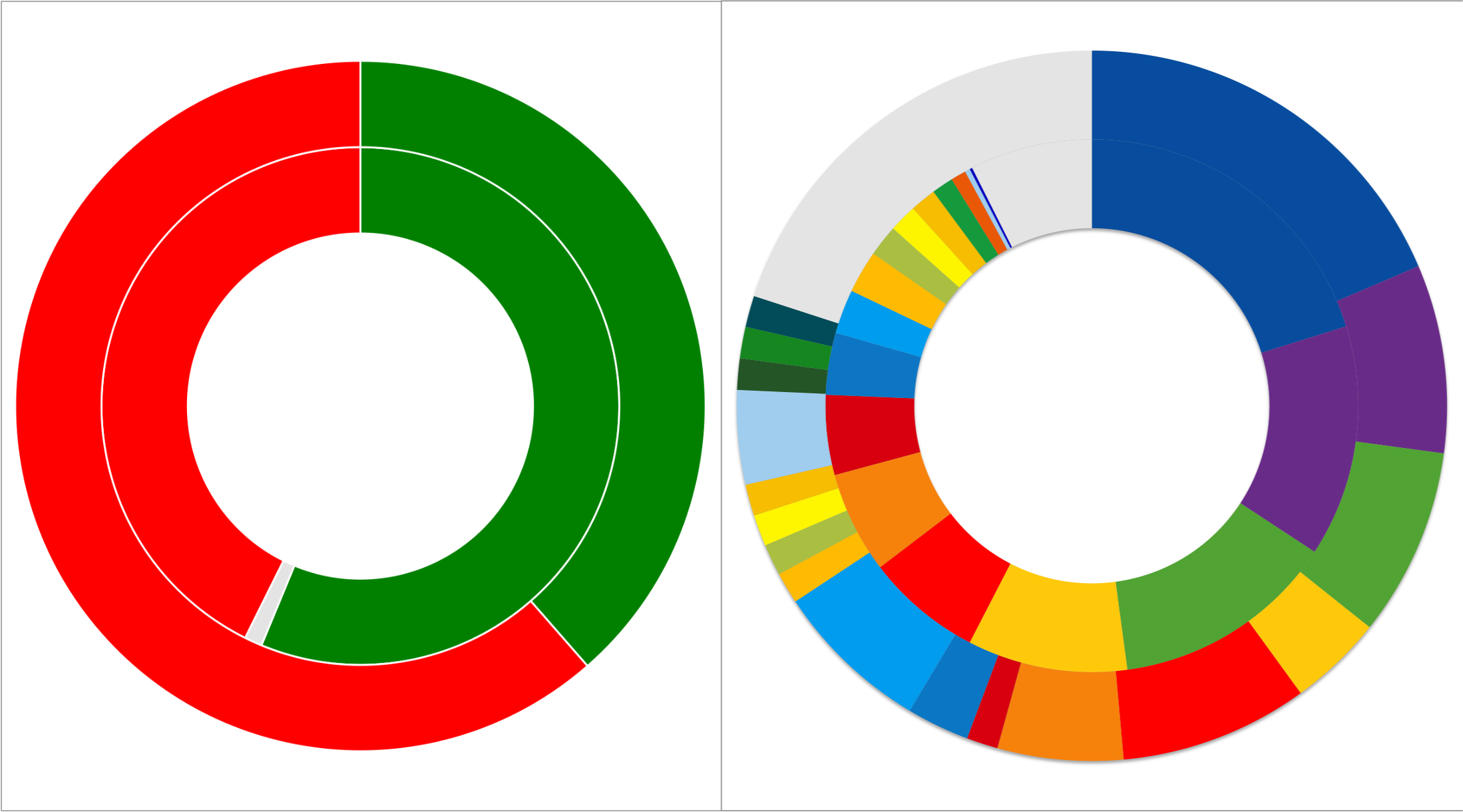
Ring charts of the election results showing popular vote against seats won, coloured in green (Pro-democracy camp) and red (Pro-Beijing camp) on the left and the party colours on the right. Seats won in the election (outer ring) against number of votes (inner ring).

Popular vote
DAB	20.22%
Civic	14.08%
Democratic	13.65%
People Power	9.73%
FTU	7.06%
Labour	6.19%
LSD	4.86%
NPP	3.76%
Liberal	2.69%
NWSC	2.42%
New Dynamic	1.91%
ADPL	1.69%
Neo Democrats	1.58%
Civil Force	1.32%
Third Force	0.93%
Econ Synergy	0.32%
YTDA	0.16%
Independent	7.43%

=== Seats summary ===
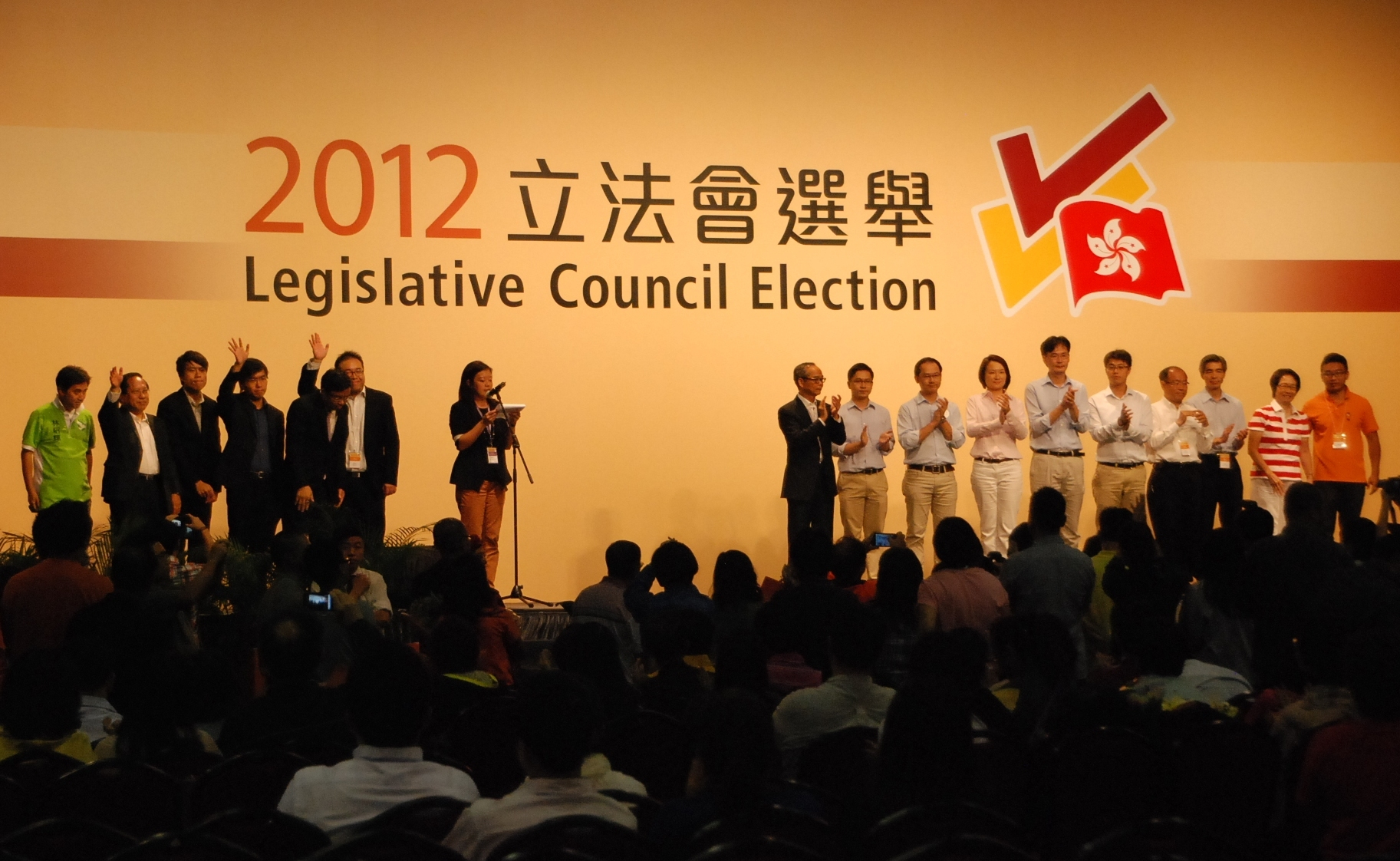
The election results were announced in the AsiaWorld-Expo.

Seat
DAB	18.57%
Civic	8.57%
Democratic	8.57%
FTU	8.57%
Liberal	7.14%
Labour	5.71%
People Power	4.29%
Econ Synergy	4.29%
NPP	2.86%
LSD	1.43%
NWSC	1.43%
New Dynamic	1.43%
ADPL	1.43%
Neo Democrats	1.43%
Independent	24.29%

=== Incumbents defeated ===
Twelve incumbents were not re-elected.

Party	Name	Constituency	Remarks
Civic	Tanya Chan	Hong Kong Island	placed second of the list
Civic	Audrey Eu Yuet-mee	New Territories West	placed second of the list; running for Hong Kong Island in the last election
DAB	Lau Kong-wah	District Council (Second)	running for New Territories East in the last election
Democratic	Cheung Man-kwong	Kowloon West	placed second of the list; running for Education constituency in the last election
Democratic	Lee Wing-tat	New Territories West	
Democratic	Wong Sing-chi	New Territories East	
FTU	Pan Pey-chyou	Hong Kong Island	placed second of the list; running for Labour constituency in the last election
FTU	Ip Wai-ming	New Territories East	running for Labour constituency in the last election
Liberal	Miriam Lau Kin-yee	Hong Kong Island	running for Transport constituency in the last election
Professional Forum	Raymond Ho Chung-tai	Engineering	
Professional Forum	Patrick Lau Sau-shing	Architectural, Surveying and Planning	
Independent	Samson Tam Wai-ho	Information Technology	

== Candidates lists and results ==
=== Geographical Constituencies (35 seats) ===
Voting system: Party-list proportional representation with largest remainder method and Hare quota.

Results of the Geographical Constituencies
Hong Kong Island (香港島)

List №	Party/Allegiance	Candidate(s) won	Not elected	Votes	Votes %	Seat(s) won
1	Nonpartisan		Hui Ching-on	2,980	0.90	
2	Democratic	Sin Chung-kai	Yeung Sum, Chai Man-hon, Cheng Lai-king, Leung Suk-ching, Hui Chi-fung	40,558	12.26	1
3	Independent		Lo Wing-lok	16,900	5.11	
4	People Power		Christopher Lau Gar-hung, Shiu Yeuk-yuen, Jeff Au Yeung Ying-kit	18,667	5.64	
5	DAB	Christopher Chung Shu-kun	Eddie Ting Kong-ho, Jennifer Chow Kit-bing, Kung Pak-cheung, Ngan Chun-lim, Kenny Lee Kwun-yee, Cheng Chi-sing	33,901	10.25	1
6	Independent		Ng Wing-chun	422	0.13	
7	Labour	Cyd Ho Sau-lan	Cheng Sze-lut, Chung Chung-fai	31,523	9.53	1
8	NPP	Regina Ip Lau Suk-yee	Wong Chor-fung, Tse Tsz-kei	30,289	9.16	1
9	FTU	Wong Kwok-hing	Pan Pey-chyou, Chu Ting-lok, Stanley Ho Ngai-kam, Chan Chi-hang	27,336	8.26	1
10	Civic	Chan Ka-lok	Tanya Chan	70,475	21.31	1
11	Nonpartisan		Ho Kar-tai	343	0.10	
12	DAB	Jasper Tsang Yok-sing		36,517	11.04	1
13	Liberal		Miriam Lau Kin-yee, Shiu Ka-fai, "Micheal" Lee Chun-keung	17,686	5.35	
14	LSD		Avery Ng Man-yuen	3,169	0.96	
TOTAL (Quota: 47,252 votes, 14.29%)				330,766	100.0	7

Kowloon West (九龍西)

List №	Party/Allegiance	Candidate(s) won	Not elected	Votes	Votes %	Seat(s) won
1	Independent		Wong Yee-him	3,746	1.61	
2	Democratic	"Helena" Wong Pik-wan	Cheung Man-kwong, Li Yiu-kee, Yuen Hoi-man, "Michelle" Chong Miu-sheung	36,029	15.52	1
3	ADPL		Tam Kwok-kiu, Liu Sing-lee, Rosanda Mok Ka-han,Wong Chi-yung, Austen Ng Po-shan	30,364	13.2	
4	Independent democrat		Wong Yat-yuk	2,399	1.03	
5	DAB	"Ann" Chiang Lai-wan	Chris Ip Ngo-tung, Vincent Cheng Wing-shun, Chan Wai-ming, "Sam" Lam Sum-lim	47,363	20.41	1
6	People Power	Wong Yuk-man	Yim Tat-ming, Chau Tsun-kiu, Lau Tit-wai	38,578	16.62	1
7	Awakening Association		Lam Yi-lai, Simon Ho Ka-kuen, Au Wing-ho, Lee Ka-wai	859	0.37	
8	KWND	Leung Mei-fun	Yang Wing-kit, Wai Hoi-ying, Leung Man-kwong	34,548	14.89	1
9	Civic	Claudia Mo Man-ching	Joe Wong Tak-chuen	37,925	16.34	1
TOTAL (Quota: 46,416 votes, 20.00%)				232,081	100.0	5

Kowloon East (九龍東)

List №	Party/Allegiance	Candidate(s) won	Not elected	Votes	Votes %	Seat(s) won
1	Civic	Alan Leong Kah-kit	Jeremy Jansen Tam Man-ho	41,669	14.63	1
2	FTU	Wong Kwok-kin	Kan Ming-tung, Mok Kin-wing, Ho Kai-ming	40,824	14.34	1
3	LSD		Andrew To Kwan-hang	27,253	9.57	
4	Nonpartisan		Kay Yim Fung-chi, Chan Heung-yin	3,263	1.15	
5	Democratic	Wu Chi-wai	Mok Kin-shing, Hon Ka-ming	43,764	15.37	1
6	DAB	Chan Kam-lam	Joe Lai Wing-ho, Hung Kam-in, Wilson Or Chong-shing	47,415	16.65	1
7	Independent	Paul Tse Wai-chun		38,546	13.54	1
8	People Power		Wong Yeung-tat, Chan Sau-wai	36,608	12.85	
9	Independent		Tam Heung-man	5,440	1.91	
TOTAL (Quota: 56,956 votes, 20.00%)				284,782	100.0	5

New Territories West (新界西)

List №	Party/Allegiance	Candidate(s) won	Not elected	Votes	Votes %	Seat(s) won
1	DAB	Leung Che-cheung	Tsang Hin-keung, Lui Kin, Christina Maisenne Lee, Wong Wai-ling, Chui Kwan-siu	33,777	6.79	1
2	FTU	Alice Mak Mei-kuen	"Michael" Luk Chung-hung, Manwell Chan, Kot Siu-yuen, Tang Cheuk-him	35,239	7.07	1
3	Democratic		Josephine Chan Shu-ying, Zachary Wong Wai-yin, Li Hung-por, Catherine Wong Lai-sheung, Ho Hang-mui	25,892	5.20	
4	People Power	Albert Chan Wai-yip	Jacqueline Chan So-ling, Raymond Lai, Tong Wing-chi	44,355	8.91	1
5	Democratic Alliance		Mak Ip-sing	2,896	0.58	
6	LSD		Tsang Kin-shing	9,280	1.86	
7	Civic	Kwok Ka-ki	Audrey Eu Yuet-mee	72,185	14.49	1
8	NPP	Michael Tien Puk-sun	Clarice Cheung Wai-ching, "Legward" Wong Cheuk-kin, Ho Kin-cheong	37,808	7.58	1
9	Nonpartisan		"Junius" Ho Kwan-yiu	10,805	2.17	
10	Independent		Chan Yut-wah	11,997	2.41	
11	NWSC	Leung Yiu-chung	Wong Yun-tat	42,799	8.78	1
12	DAB/NTAS	Chan Han-pan	Poon Chi-shing, Nixie Lam Lam, Chan Chun-chung, Law Kwan, Leung Kar-ming, Tsang Tai	36,555	7.33	1
13	Third Force		Chan Keung, Ting Yin-wah, So Ka-man, Chow Ping-tim, Tang Ka-leung, Nancy Poon Siu-ping, Raju Gurung	16,767	3.37	
14	Democratic		Lee Wing-tat, Lam Lap-chi, Lai King-wai	32,792	6.58	
15	Labour	Lee Cheuk-yan	Tam Chun-yin	40,967	8.22	1
16	DAB	Tam Yiu-chung	Lung Shui-hing, Yip Man-pan, Mo Shing-fung	43,496	8.72	1
TOTAL (Quota: 55,401 votes, 11.11%)				498,610	100.0	9

New Territories East (新界東)

List №	Party/Allegiance	Candidate(s) won	Not elected	Votes	Votes %	Seat(s) won
1	LSD	Leung Kwok-hung		48,295	10.39	1
2	FTU		Ip Wai-ming, Wong Wang-to, Ching Ngon-lai, Kan Siu-kei, Kent Tsang King-chung, Cheung Kwok-wo	24,458	5.26	
3	Democratic	Emily Lau Wai-hing	Ricky Or Yiu-lam, Frankie Lam Siu-ching, Lam Wing-yin	37,039	7.97	1
4	Independent		Angel Leung On-kay	1,077	0.23	
5	Civil Force/New Forum		Scarlett Pong Oi-lan, Lanny Tam, Law Kwong-keung, Chan Kwok-tim, So Chun-man, Lam Chung-yan, Victor Leung Ka-fai, Chan Man-kuen, Tang Wing-cheong	23,988	5.16	
6	DAB	Elizabeth Quat	Chong Yuen-tung, Li Sai-wing, Philip Li Ka-leung, Tung Kin-lei, Ki Lai-mei, Wong Ping-fan	46,139	9.93	1
7	People Power/Frontier	Ray Chan Chi-chuen	Erica Yuen Mi-ming	38,042	8.19	1
8	Economic Synergy		Yau Wing-kwong, Tong Po-chun, Chan Cho-leung, Pang Shu-wan, Lau Wai-lun, Shing Kwok-chu, Man Chen-fai, Tang Kwong-wing, Lok Shui-sang	5,717	1.23	
9	DAB	Chan Hak-kan	Lau Kwok-fan, Wong Pik-kiu,Larm Wai-leung, Clement Woo Kin-man, Yiu Ming	40,997	8.82	1
10	Labour	Cheung Chiu-hung	Kwok Wing-kin	39,650	8.53	1
11	Democratic		Richard Tsoi Yiu-cheong, Au Chun-wah, Mak Yun-pui, Kwong Mei-na	10,028	2.16	
12	Neo Democrats	Gary Fan Kwok-wai	Yam Kai-bong, Leung Li, Leung Wing-hung, Kwan Wing-yip, Yau Man-chun, Cheung Kam-lun, Cheung Kwok-keung, Michael Yung Ming-chau	28,621	6.16	1
13	Liberal	James Tien Pei-chun	Selina Chow Liang Shuk-yee, Leung Chi-wai, Liu Kwok-wah	31,016	6.67	1
14	Democratic		Wong Sing-chi, Law Sai-yan	21,118	4.54	
15	Civic	Ronny Tong Ka-wah	Alvin Yeung Ngok-kiu	32,753	7.05	1
16	Independent		Raymond Ho Man-kit	2,875	0.62	
17	Nonpartisan		Pong Yat-ming	6,031	1.30	
18	Independent		Christine Fong Kwok-shan	24,594	5.29	
19	Nonpartisan		Chan Kwok-keung	2,327	0.50	
TOTAL (Quota: 51,638 votes, 11.11%)				464,745	100.0	9

=== District Council (Second) Functional Constituency (5 seats) ===
Voting system: Party-list proportional representation with largest remainder method and Hare quota.

District Council (Second) Functional Constituency (區議會（第二）功能組別)

List №	Party/Allegiance	Candidate(s) won	Not elected	Votes	Votes %	Seat(s) won
801	Democratic	"Albert" Ho Chun-yan	Kwong Chun-yu, Lam Siu-fai	228,840	14.38	1
802	Democratic	James To Kun-sun	Andrew Chiu Ka-yin, Au Nok-hin	316,468	19.88	1
803	Independent		Pamela Peck Wan-kam	61,321	3.85	
804	DAB/Civil Force		Lau Kong-wah	199,732	12.55	
805	ADPL	Frederick Fung Kin-kee	Hui Kam-shing	262,172	16.47	1
806	DAB	Starry Lee Wai-king	Hung Lin-cham, Chan Hok-fung, Chu Lap-wai, Ngan Man-yu	277,143	17.41	1
807	FTU	Chan Yuen-han	Dennis Leung Tsz-wing, Wong Yun-cheong	246,196	15.47	1
TOTAL (Quota: 318,374 votes, 20%)				1,591,872	100.0	5

=== Other Functional Constituencies (30 seats) ===
Voting systems: Different voting systems apply to different functional constituencies, namely for the Heung Yee Kuk, Agriculture and Fisheries, Insurance and Transport, the preferential elimination system of voting; and for the remaining 24 FCs used the first-past-the-post voting system.

Results of the Functional Constituencies (excluding District Council (Second))
Constituency	Incumbent	Result	Candidate(s)
Heung Yee Kuk	Lau Wong-fat (Economic Synergy)	Incumbent hold	Lau Wong-fat (Economic Synergy) uncontested
Agriculture and Fisheries	Wong Yung-kan (DAB)	Incumbent retired DAB hold	Steven Ho Chun-yin (DAB) 85.37% Chan Mei-tak 14.63%
Insurance	Chan Kin-por	Incumbent hold	Chan Kin-por uncontested
Transport	Miriam Lau Kin-yee (Liberal)	Incumbent ran for HKI GC; Liberal hold	Frankie Yick Chi-ming (Liberal) uncontested
Education	Cheung Man-kwong (PTU/Democratic)	Incumbent ran for KLW GC; PTU hold	Ip Kin-yuen (PTU) 75.42% Ho Hon-kuen 24.58%
Legal	Margaret Ng Ngoi-yee (Civic)	Incumbent retired Civic hold	"Dennis" Kwok Wing-hang (Civic) 56.20% Albert Wong Kwai-huen (Independent) 43.80%
Accountancy	Vacant; Post last held by Paul Chan Mo-po	Incumbent retired Nonpartisan gain	Kenneth Leung Kai-cheong 46.76% Nelson Lam Chi-yuen (Independent) 39.70% Wong Wang-tai 8.11% Peter Chan Po-fun 5.44%
Medical	Leung Ka-lau	Incumbent re-elected	Leung Ka-lau 67.31% Tse Hung-hing 32.69%
Health Services	Joseph Lee Kok-long	Incumbent re-elected	Joseph Lee Kok-long (Independent) 76.01% Alice Tso Shing-yuk 23.99%
Engineering	Raymond Ho Chung-tai (Professional Forum)	Incumbent lost re-election Independent gain	Lo Wai-kwok (Independent) 41.46% Albert Lai Kwong-tak (Prof Commons/Civic) 28.79% Raymond Ho Chung-tai 23.97% Luk Wang-kwong 5.78%
Architectural, Surveying and Planning	Patrick Lau Sau-shing (Professional Forum)	Incumbent lost re-election Independent gain	Tony Tse Wai-chuen (Independent) 35.20% Patrick Lau Sau-shing (Independent) 33.91% Stanley Ng Wing-fai (Democratic) 30.89%
Labour (3 seats)	Li Fung-ying (FLU)	Incumbent retired FLU hold	Poon Siu-ping (FLU) uncontested
Labour (3 seats)	Ip Wai-ming (FTU)	Incumbent ran for NTE GC; FTU hold	Kwok Wai-keung (FTU) uncontested
Labour (3 seats)	Pan Pey-chyou (FTU)	Incumbent ran for HKI GC; FTU hold	Tang Ka-piu (FTU) uncontested
Social Welfare	Cheung Kwok-che (SWGU/Labour)	Incumbent re-elected	Cheung Kwok-che (SWGU/Labour) 89.08% Chan Yee-fei 10.92%
Real Estate and Construction	"Abraham Razack" Shek Lai-him (Professional Forum)	Incumbent hold	"Abraham Razack" Shek Lai-him (Independent) uncontested
Tourism	Paul Tse Wai-chun (Independent)	Incumbent ran for KLE GC; Nonpartisan gain	Yiu Si-wing 56.48% Freddy Yip Hing-ning 43.52%
Commercial (First)	Jeffrey Lam Kin-fung (Economic Synergy)	Incumbent hold	Jeffrey Lam Kin-fung (Economic Synergy) uncontested
Commercial (Second)	Philip Wong Yu-hong (Business and Professional Alliance)	Incumbent retired Nonpartisan gain	Martin Liao Cheung-kong uncontested
Industrial (First)	Andrew Leung Kwan-yuen (Economic Synergy)	Incumbent hold	Andrew Leung Kwan-yuen (Economic Synergy) uncontested
Industrial (Second)	Lam Tai-fai	Incumbent hold	Lam Tai-fai uncontested
Finance	David Li Kwok-po	Incumbent retired Independent gain	Ng Leung-sing (Independent) uncontested
Financial Services	Chim Pui-chung	Incumbent retired Nonpartisan gain	Christopher Cheung Wah-fung 44.83% Vincent Marshall Lee Kwan-ho 43.53% Frankie Yan Man-sing 5.39% Tang Yu-lap 5.17% Patrick Lam Tak-ming 1.08%
Sports, Performing Arts, Culture and Publication	Timothy Fok Tsun-ting	Incumbent retired New Forum gain	Ma Fung-kwok (New Forum) 65.37% Chow Chun-fai 28.19% "Jimmy" Siu See-kong 6.44%
Import and Export	Wong Ting-kwong (DAB)	Incumbent hold	Wong Ting-kwong (DAB) uncontested
Textiles and Garment	Sophie Leung Lau Yau-fun (Economic Synergy)	Incumbent retired Liberal gain	Chung Kwok-pan (Liberal) 56.07% Henry Tan 43.93%
Wholesale and Retail	Vincent Fang Kang (Liberal)	Incumbent hold	Vincent Fang Kang (Liberal) uncontested
Information Technology	Tam Wai-ho	Incumbent lost re-election Independent gain	Charles Peter Mok (Independent) 57.82% Tam Wai-ho (Independent) 42.18%
Catering	Tommy Cheung Yu-yan (Liberal)	Incumbent hold	Tommy Cheung Yu-yan (Liberal) uncontested
District Council (First)	Ip Kwok-him (DAB)	Incumbent hold	Ip Kwok-him (DAB) uncontested

== See also ==
- Legislative Council of Hong Kong
- Hong Kong legislative elections
- 2008 Hong Kong legislative election
