= 2012 Hong Kong legislative election in New Territories West =

- 9 September 2012

All 9 New Territories West seats to the Legislative Council
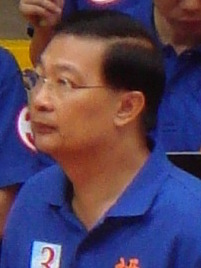

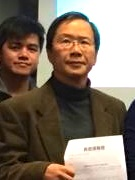

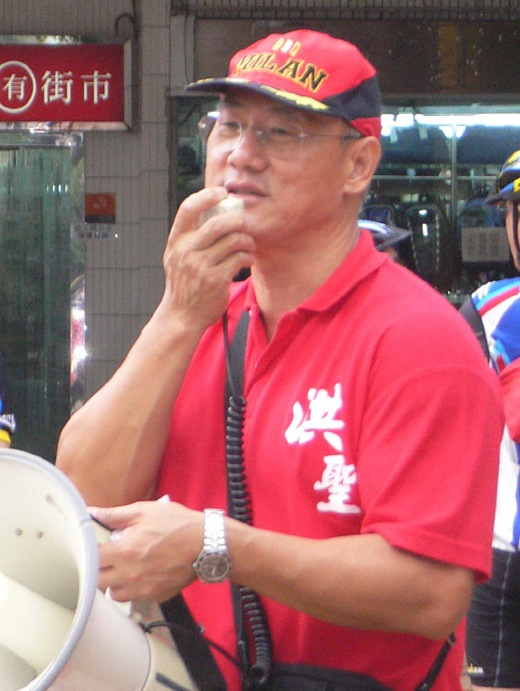

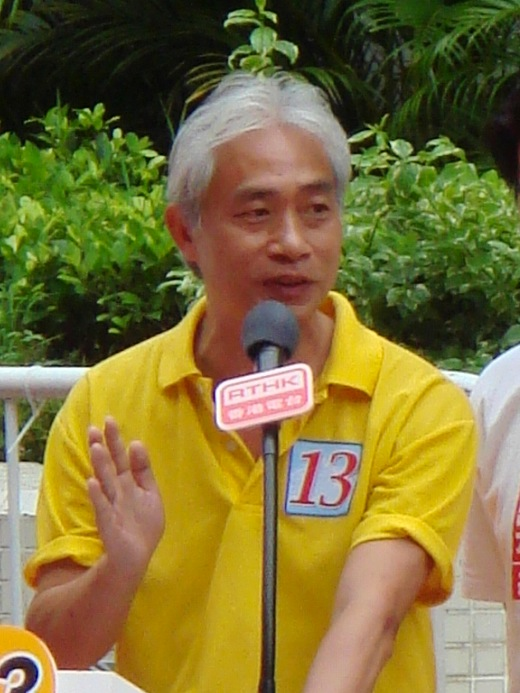

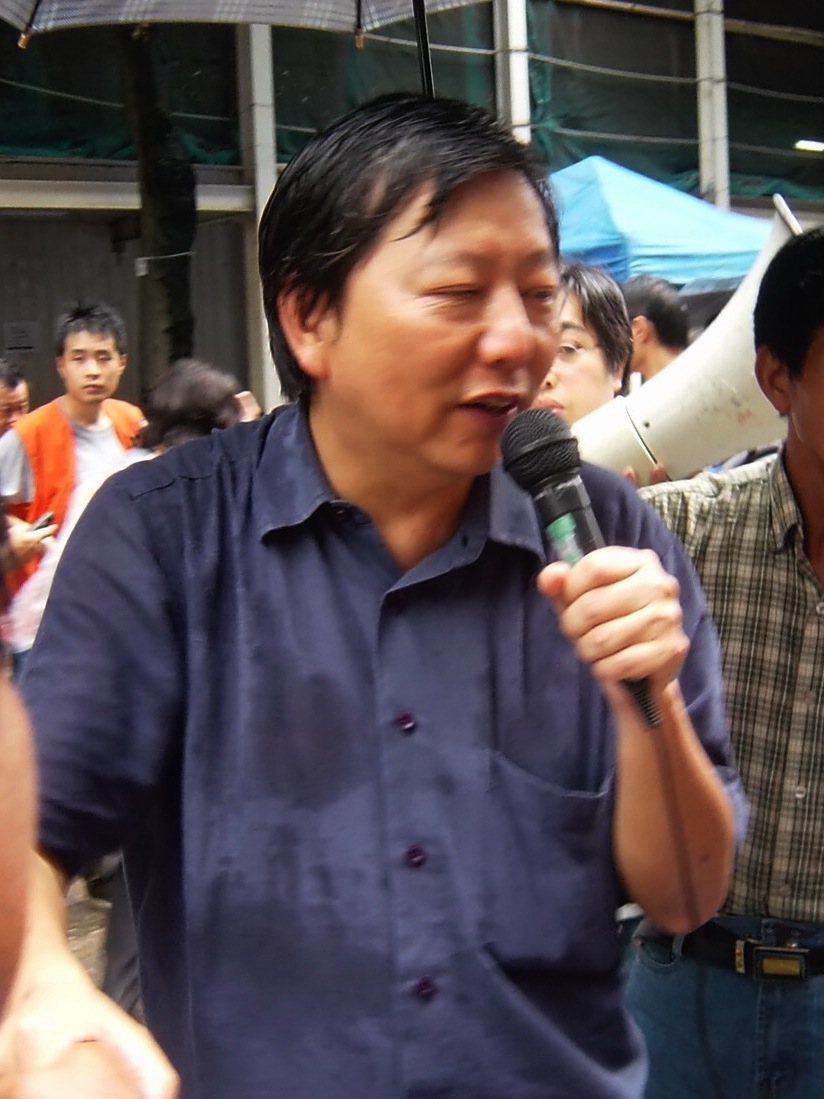

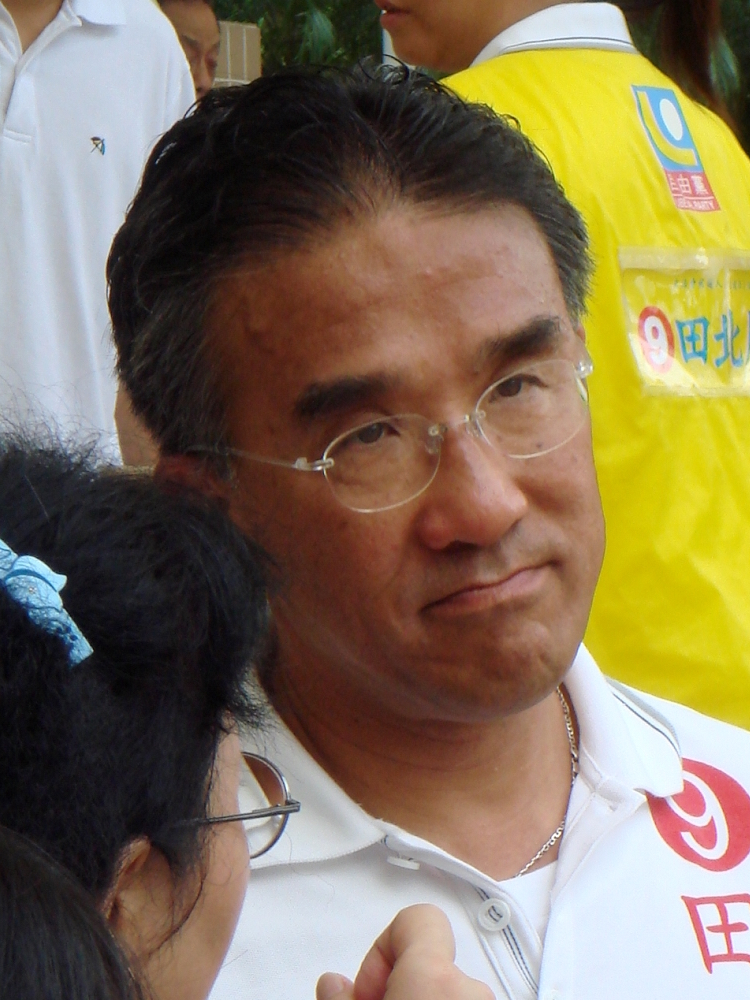

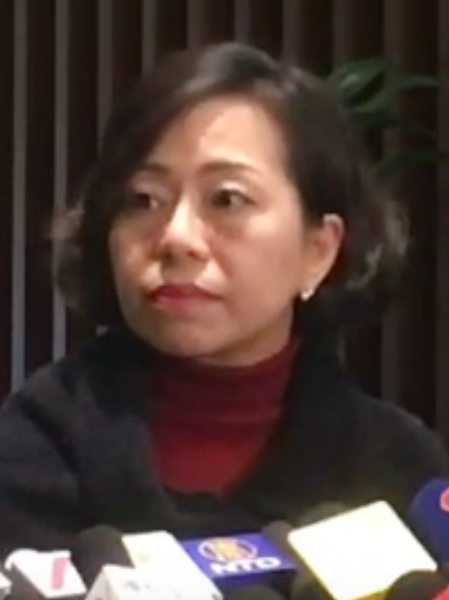

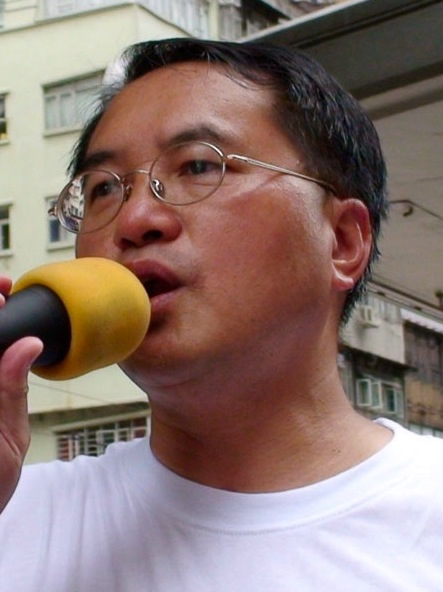
	First party	Second party	Third party
Leader	Tam Yiu-chung, Leung Che-cheung & Ben Chan	Kwok Ka-ki	Albert Chan
Party	DAB	Civic	People Power
Alliance	Pro-Beijing	Pan-democracy	Pan-democracy
Last election	2 seats, 23.1%	0 seat, 7.0%	1 seat, 8.1%
Seats before	2	0	1
Seats won	3	1	1
Seat change	▲1	▲1	Steady
Popular vote	113,828	72,185	44,355
Percentage	22.8%	14.5%	8.9%
Swing	▼0.3%	▲7.5%	▲0.8%
	Fourth party	Fifth party	Sixth party
Leader	Leung Yiu-chung	Lee Cheuk-yan	Michael Tien
Party	NWSC	Labour	NPP
Alliance	Pan-democracy	Pan-democracy	Pro-Beijing
Last election	1 seat, 10.7%	1 seat, 10.6%	new
Seats before	1	1	0
Seats won	1	1	1
Seat change	Steady	Steady	▲1
Popular vote	43,799	40,967	37,808
Percentage	8.8%	8.2%	7.6%
Swing	▼1.9%	▼2.4%	N/A
	Seventh party	Eighth party
Leader	Alice Mak	Lee Wing-tat
Party	FTU	Democratic
Alliance	Pro-Beijing	Pan-democracy
Last election	1 seat, 9.0%	2 seats, 23.2%
Seats before	1	2
Seats won	1	0
Seat change	Steady	▼2
Popular vote	35,239	58,684
Percentage	7.1%	11.8%
Swing	▼1.9%	▼11.4%
- Party with most votes in each District Council Constituency.

These are the New Territories West results of the 2012 Hong Kong legislative election. The election was held on 9 September 2012 and all 9 seats in New Territories West, which consists of Tsuen Wan District, Tuen Mun District, Yuen Long District, Kwai Tsing District and Islands District, were contested. The Democratic Party suffered a devastating result by losing all two of their seats in the region. The electoral strategy of the Civic Party, the heavyweight Audrey Eu placed second after Kwok Ka-ki in the hope of gaining two seats, produced an extra 70,000 votes but this was still not enough to get Eu into the LegCo. The Democratic Alliance for the Betterment and Progress of Hong Kong split three separate lists in order to avoid wasted votes (see largest remainder method). All three DAB lists were elected.

== Overall results ==
Before election:

↓
5	3
Pan-democracy	Pro-Beijing

Change in composition:

↓
4	5
Pan-democracy	Pro-Beijing

Party	Seats	Seats change	Contesting list(s)	Votes	%	% change
Civic	1	+1	1	72,185	14.5	+7.5
Democratic	0	−2	2	58,684	11.8	−11.4
People Power	1	0	1	44,355	8.9	+0.8
NWSC	1	0	1	43,799	8.8	−1.9
Labour	1	0	1	40,967	8.2	−2.4
LSD	0	0	1	9,280	1.9	N/A
Democratic Alliance	0	0	1	2,896	0.6	N/A
Pro-democracy camp	4	–1	8	272,166	54.6	−6.7
DAB	3	+1	3	113,828	22.8	−0.3
NPP	1	+1	1	37,808	7.6	N/A
FTU	1	0	1	35,239	7.1	−1.9
Third Force	0	0	1	16,767	3.4	N/A
Independent	0	0	1	10,805	2.2	N/A
Pro-Beijing camp	5	+2	7	214,447	43.0	+4.7
Independent	0	0	1	11,997	2.4	N/A
Turnout:				232,081	53.3	

== Candidates list ==
Legislative Election 2012: New Territories West
List	Candidates	Votes	Of total (%)	± from prev.
Civic	Kwok Ka-ki Audrey Eu Yuet-mee	72,185	14.48 (11.11+3.37)	+7.48
People Power	Albert Chan Wai-yip Jacqueline Chan So-ling, Raymond Lai, Tong Wing-chi	44,355	8.90	+0.80
NWSC	Leung Yiu-chung Wong Yun-fat	43,799	8.78	−1.92
DAB	Tam Yiu-chung Lung Shui-hing, Yip Man-pan, Mo Shing-fung	43,496	8.72	−14.38
Labour	Lee Cheuk-yan Tam Chun-yin	40,967	8.22	−2.38
NPP	Michael Tien Puk-sun Clarice Cheung Wai-ching, Wong Cheuk-kin, Ho Kin-cheong	37,808	7.58	N/A
DAB (NTAS)	Chan Han-pan Poon Chi-shing, Nixie Lam Lam, Chan Chun-chung, Law Kwan, Leung Kar-ming, Tsang Tai	36,555	7.33	N/A
FTU	Alice Mak Mei-kuen Luk Chung-hung, Manwell Chan, Kot Siu-yuen, Tang Cheuk-him	35,239	7.07	−1.93
DAB	Leung Che-cheung Tsang Hin-keung, Lui Kin, Christina Maisenne Lee, Wong Wai-ling, Chui Kwan-siu	33,777	6.77	N/A
Democratic	Lee Wing-tat, Lam Lap-chi, Lai King-wai	32,792	6.58	−4.92
Democratic	Josephine Chan Shu-ying, Zachary Wong Wai-ying, Li Hung-por, Catherine Wong Lai-sheung, Ho Hang-mui	25,892	5.19	−4.01
Third Force	Chan Keung, Ting Yin-wah, So Ka-man, Chow Ping-tim, Tang Ka-leung, Nancy Poon Siu-ping, Raju Gurung	16,767	3.36	N/A
Independent	Chan Yut-wah	11,997	2.41	N/A
Independent	Ho Kwan-yiu	10,805	2.17	N/A
LSD	Tsang Kin-shing	9,280	1.86	N/A
Democratic Alliance	Mak Ip-sing	2,896	0.58	N/A
Turnout		498,610	50.73	+8.24

== Results by districts ==
List	Candidates	Tsuen Wan	Tuen Mun	Yuen Long	Kwai Tsing	Islands	Total
DAB	Leung Che-cheung	1.17	2.31	20.34	1.06	6.74	6.77
FTU	Alice Mak	5.04	7.78	5.87	8.27	9.26	7.07
Democratic	Josephine Chan	2.59	10.70	6.48	1.05	1.75	5.19
People Power	Albert Chan	8.72	9.47	9.31	8.09	8.77	8.90
Democratic Alliance	Mak Ip-shing	0.15	0.34	1.55	0.20	0.23	0.58
LSD	Tsang Kin-shing	1.56	1.98	2.05	1.80	1.61	1.86
Civic	Kwok Ka-ki	20.43	14.36	12.43	12.40	17.46	14.48
NPP	Michael Tien	11.75	6.43	7.40	6.84	5.59	7.58
Nonpartisan	Junius Ho	1.31	2.37	2.06	2.68	1.74	2.17
Independent	Chan Yut-wah	2.54	2.35	2.74	2.00	2.67	2.41
NWSC	Leung Yiu-chung	8.75	6.16	5.50	14.94	6.73	8.78
DAB	Chan Han-pan	17.48	0.99	0.82	12.34	13.27	7.33
Third Force	Chan Keung	0.60	3.29	6.29	1.91	4.64	3.36
Democratic	Lee Wing-tat	7.43	2.95	2.38	13.33	7.72	6.58
Labour	Lee Cheuk-yan	5.92	9.18	10.10	7.22	6.42	8.22
DAB	Tam Yiu-chung	4.55	19.33	4.67	5.89	5.39	8.72

== See also ==
- Legislative Council of Hong Kong
- Hong Kong legislative elections
- 2012 Hong Kong legislative election
