= Engineering (constituency) =

Electoral constituency in Hong Kong

Engineering 工程界
- Functional constituency for the Legislative Council of Hong Kong
- Region: Hong Kong
- Electorate: 9,699

Current constituency
- Created: 1991
- Number of members: One
- Member: Aaron Bok (BPA)
- Created from: Engineering, Architectural, Surveying and Planning

The Engineering functional constituency (Chinese: 工程界功能界別) is a functional constituency in the elections for the Legislative Council of Hong Kong first created in 1991, derived from the Engineering, Architectural, Surveying and Planning functional constituency. The constituency is composed of professional engineers and the members of the Hong Kong Institution of Engineers. As of 2021, it was composed of 10,772 registered voters.

== Return members ==
Election	Member	Party
1991	Samuel Wong→vacant (Note: Died in office)	Independent
1995	Samuel Wong→vacant	Independent
Not represented in the PLC (1997–1998)
1998	Raymond Ho	Independent
2000	Raymond Ho	Independent
2004	Raymond Ho	Independent→Alliance
2008	Raymond Ho	Alliance→Professional Forum
2012	Lo Wai-kwok	Independent→BPA
2016	Lo Wai-kwok	BPA
2021	Lo Wai-kwok	BPA
2025	Aaron Bok	BPA

== Electoral results ==
=== 2020s ===
2025 Legislative Council election: Engineering
Party	Candidate	Votes	%	±%
BPA	Aaron Bok Kwok-ming	3,058	56.26	−19.33
Independent	Wilton Fok Wai-tung	2,377	43.74	
Majority		681	12.52	
Total valid votes		5,435	100.00	
Rejected ballots		302	5.26	
Turnout		5,737	59.15	+10.05
Registered electors		9,699		
BPA hold		Swing		

2021 Legislative Council election: Engineering
Party	Candidate	Votes	%	±%
BPA	Lo Wai-kwok	3,849	75.59	+20.12
Independent	Wong Wai-shun	1,243	24.41	
Majority		2,606	51.18	
Total valid votes		5,092	100.00	
Rejected ballots		197		
Turnout		5,289	49.10	
Registered electors		10,772		
BPA hold		Swing		

=== 2010s ===
2016 Legislative Council election: Engineering
Party	Candidate	Votes	%	±%
BPA	Lo Wai-kwok	3,906	55.47	+13.01
Independent	Louis Ching Ming-tat	2,097	29.78	
Independent	John Luk Wang-kwong	1,039	14.75	
Majority		1,809	25.69	
Total valid votes		7,042	100.00	
Rejected ballots		284		
Turnout		7,326	77.89	
Registered electors		9,406		
BPA hold		Swing		

2012 Legislative Council election:Engineering
Party	Candidate	Votes	%	±%
Independent	Lo Wai-kwok	2,811	41.46	
Prof Commons (Civic)	Albert Lai Kwong-tak	1,952	28.79	−17.68
Independent	Raymond Ho Chung-tai	1,625	23.97	−26.06
Independent	Luk Wang-kwong	392	5.78	
Majority		859	12.49	
Total valid votes		6,780	100.00	
Rejected ballots		196		
Turnout		6,976	76.06	
Registered electors		9,172		
Independent gain from Independent		Swing		

=== 2000s ===
2008 Legislative Council election:Engineering
Party	Candidate	Votes	%	±%
Independent	Raymond Ho Chung-tai	2,715	50.03	−7.26
Civic	Albert Lai Kwong-tak	2,522	46.47	
Independent	Raymond Man	190	3.50	
Majority		193	3.56	
Total valid votes		5,427	100.00	
Rejected ballots		110		
Turnout		5,537	66.53	
Registered electors		8,323		
Independent hold		Swing		

2004 Legislative Council election: Engineering
Party	Candidate	Votes	%	±%
Independent	Raymond Ho Chung-tai	2,973	57.29	−3.40
Independent	Luk Wang-kwong	2,216	42.71	+3.40
Majority		757	14.58	
Total valid votes		5,189	100.00	
Rejected ballots		313		
Turnout		5,502	75.87	
Registered electors		7,252		
Independent hold		Swing		

2000 Legislative Council election: Engineering
Party	Candidate	Votes	%	±%
Independent	Raymond Ho Chung-tai	2,186	60.69	+4.74
Independent	Luk Wang-kwong	1,416	39.31	+25.82
Majority		770	21.38	
Total valid votes		3,602	100.00	
Rejected ballots		203		
Turnout		3,805	63.40	
Registered electors		6,002		
Independent hold		Swing		

=== 1990s ===
1998 Legislative Council election: Engineering
Party	Candidate	Votes	%	±%
Independent	Raymond Ho Chung-tai	2,036	55.95	+18.65
Independent	Wong King-keung	1,112	30.56	
Independent	Luk Wang-kwong	491	13.49	
Majority		924	25.39	
Total valid votes		3,639	100.00	
Rejected ballots		168		
Turnout		3,807	71.55	
Registered electors		5,321		
Independent hold		Swing		

1995 Legislative Council election: Engineering
Party	Candidate	Votes	%	±%
Independent	Samuel Wong Ping-wai	1,382	62.70	−27.13
Independent	Raymond Ho Chung-tai	822	37.30	
Majority		560	25.40	
Total valid votes		2,240	100.00	
Rejected ballots		2		
Turnout		2,242	64.84	
Registered electors		3,458		
Independent hold		Swing		

1991 Legislative Council election: Engineering
Party	Candidate	Votes	%	±%
Independent	Samuel Wong Ping-wai	1,334	89.83	
Independent	Hogan Tang Ka-fat	151	10.17	
Majority		1,183	79.66	
Total valid votes		1,485	100.00	
Rejected ballots		26		
Turnout		1,511	53.87	
Registered electors		2,805		
Independent win (new seat)				
