= Lo Wai-kwok =

Hong Kong politician

The Honourable Lo Wai-kwok GBS, MH, JP
- 盧偉國
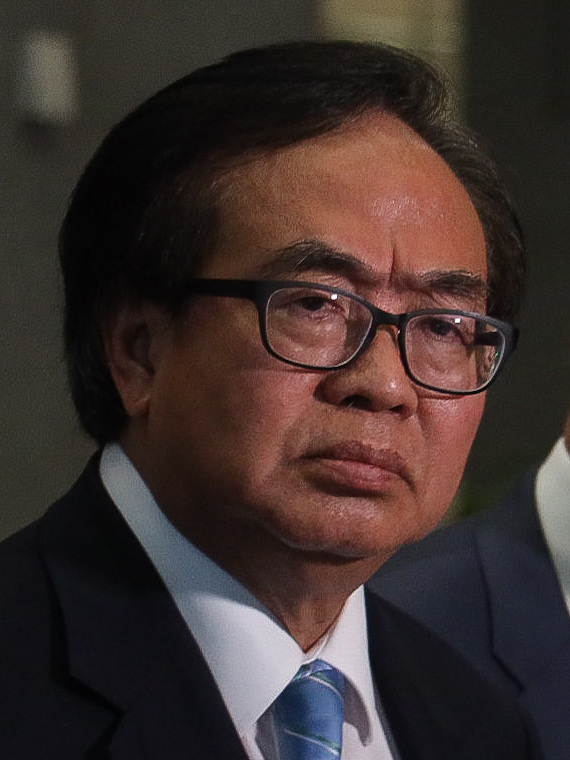
- Lo in 2023

Chairman of the Business and Professionals Alliance for Hong Kong
- Incumbent
- Assumed office 13 October 2016
- Leader: Jimmy Ng (since 2025)
- Preceded by: Andrew Leung

Member of the Legislative Council
- In office 10 October 2012 – 7 December 2025
- Preceded by: Raymond Ho
- Succeeded by: Aaron Bok
- Constituency: Engineering

Personal details
- Born: 25 December 1952 (age 73) Hong Kong
- Party: Business and Professionals Alliance for Hong Kong
- Spouse: Adelina Wong (m. 1978; died 2021) Yemina Yu Chung-yan (m. 2026)
- Children: 1
- Education: University of Hong Kong; Chinese University of Hong Kong; Warwick University
- Occupation: Legislative Councillor
- Profession: Engineer
- Website: www.irdrwklo.hk

Lo Wai-kwok (Chinese: 盧偉國; born 25 December 1952) is a former member of the Legislative Council of Hong Kong for the Engineering constituency from 2012 LegCo election until 2025, representing the Business and Professionals Alliance for Hong Kong (BPA). In 2016, he succeeded Andrew Leung to become the chairman of the BPA.

== Professional background and business career ==
Lo was born in a grassroots family and raised in a public estate. He graduated from the University of Hong Kong with a bachelor's degree in Mechanical Engineering and became an engineer by profession. He later obtained a master's degree in Industrial Engineering from the University of Hong Kong, a Master of Business Administration from the Chinese University of Hong Kong and a doctoral degree of engineering from the University of Warwick. He is a fellow of the Hong Kong Institution of Engineers, the Institution of Engineering and Technology and the Institution of Mechanical Engineers.

He moved to mainland China and opened a factory there in the 1980s and became a director of a technology company. For his business success, he was awarded Young Industrialist Awards of Hong Kong and the JCI Hong Kong Ten Outstanding Young Persons in 1992. He became the president of the Hong Kong Association for the Advancement of Science and Technology in 1997 and was the president of the Hong Kong Institution of Engineers from 2007 to 2008. He was the president of the Hong Kong Professionals and Senior Executives Association in 2014 and 2015.

== Public career and Legislative Councillor ==
He has served in many public positions, including Council member of the City University of Hong Kong from 1991 to 1998, member of the Hong Kong Productivity Council from 1993 to 1997, member of the Town Planning Board, Council for Sustainable Development, Hong Kong Council for Testing and Certification, Research Grant Council and Advisory Council on the Environment; president of the Hong Kong Association for the Advancement of Science and Technology and the Guangdong-Hong Kong Association for the Promotion of Technology Enterprise; chairman of the Hong Kong Electronics Industry Council. He is currently member of the Hong Kong Housing Authority, the Hong Kong Hospital Authority, and the West Kowloon Cultural District Authority.

He has also been an appointed member of the Sha Tin District Council from July 1997 to December 2011. In the 2012 Legislative Council election, he was elected through the Engineering functional constituency in a four-way contest, beating incumbent Raymond Ho and pro-democrat Albert Lai. He co-founded the Business and Professionals Alliance for Hong Kong (BPA), a pro-business party in October 2012 and became its vice-chairman. In 2016, he succeeded Andrew Leung to become the party chairman after Leung was elected President of the Legislative Council. But in the 2025 Legislative Council election, he announced that he will not seeking the re-election.

For his contributions he was awarded Medal of Honour in 2001, justice of the peace in 2004, Bronze Bauhinia Star in 2009 and Silver Bauhinia Star in 2015.

== Personal life ==
His first wife, Adelina Wong, passed away at noon on 2 August 2021 at Prince of Wales Hospital at the age of 69. The couple has one son, named Lo Chin-king.

Legislative Council of Hong Kong
| Preceded by Raymond Ho | Member of Legislative Council; Representative for Engineering; 2012–2025 | Succeeded by Aaron Bok |
Party political offices
| Preceded by Andrew Leung | Chairman of Business and Professionals Alliance for Hong Kong; 2016–present | Incumbent |
Order of precedence
| Preceded by Ann Chiang; Member of the Legislative Council | Hong Kong order of precedence Member of the Legislative Council | Succeeded by Felix Chung; Member of the Legislative Council |
