= 2012 Hong Kong legislative election in District Council (Second) =

- 9 September 2012

All 5 District Council (Second) seats to the Legislative Council
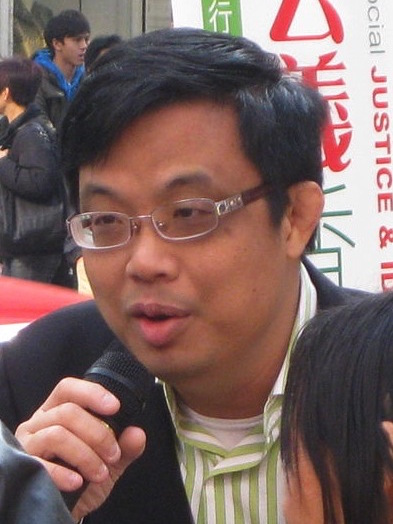

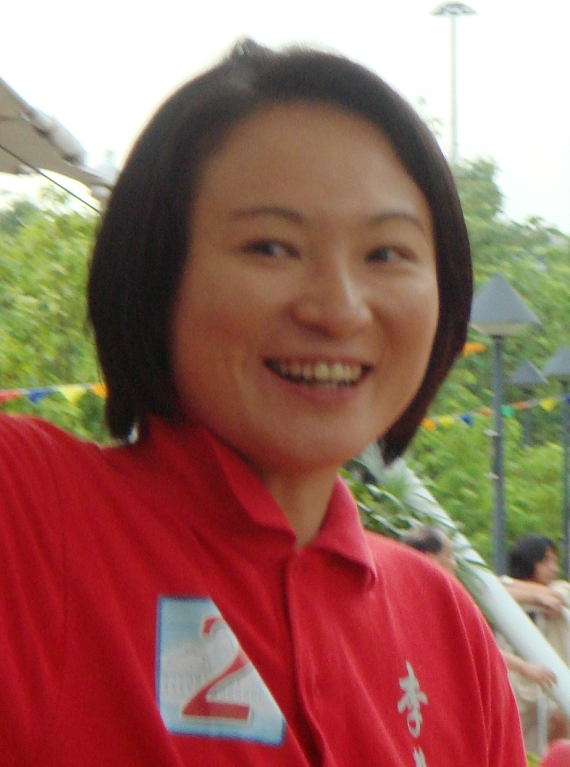

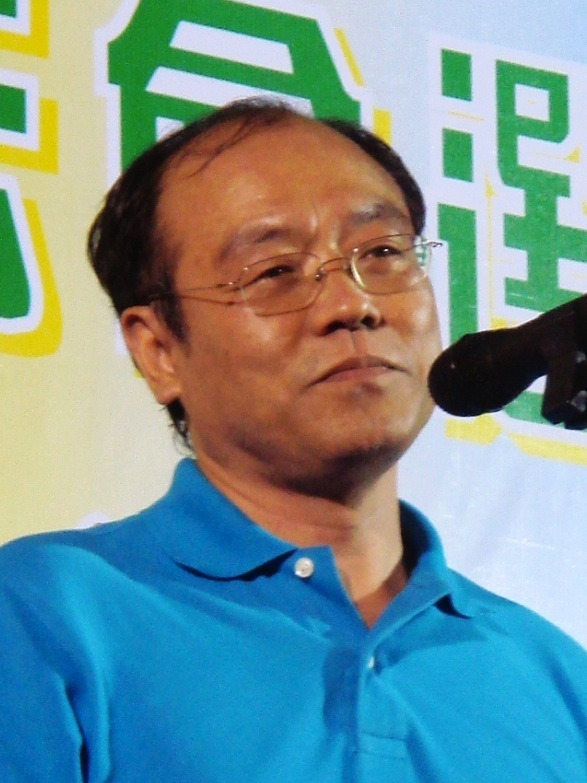

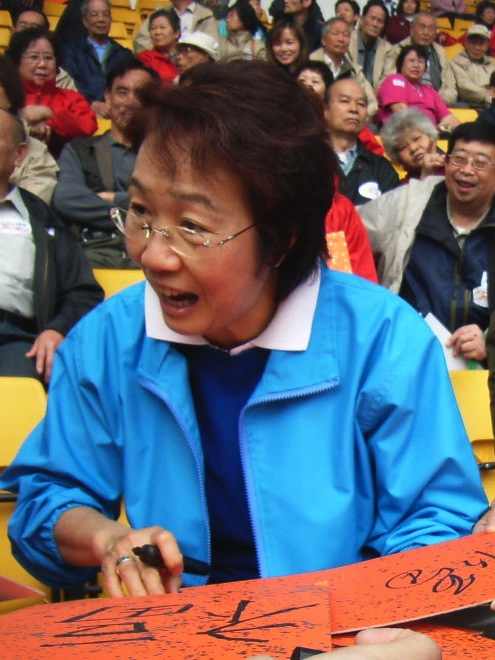
	First party	Second party
Leader	James To & Albert Ho	Starry Lee & Lau Kong-wah
Party	Democratic	DAB
Alliance	Pan-democracy	Pro-Beijing
Leader's seat	Lok Tsui & Olympic	To Kwa Wan North & Tin Sum
Seats won	2	1
Popular vote	545,308	476,875
Percentage	34.3%	30.0%
	Third party	Fourth party
Leader	Frederick Fung	Chan Yuen-han
Party	ADPL	FTU
Alliance	Pan-democracy	Pro-Beijing
Leader's seat	Lai Kok	Lung Sheung
Seats won	1	1
Popular vote	262,172	246,196
Percentage	16.5%	15.5%
- Party with most votes in each District Council Constituency.

These are the District Council (Second) functional constituency results of the 2012 Hong Kong legislative election. The election was held on 9 September 2012 and all 5 seats in were contested. The five new seats formed a new constituency under new arrangements agreed in a contentious LegCo vote in 2010, for which candidates may be nominated by the District councillors and are elected by all registered voters who are not in any 'traditional' FC, creating the largest constituency with a total of more than 3.2 million eligible electors. The vote counting system used is the same as that in the GCs: the party-list proportional representation with the largest remainder method and Hare quota.

The pro-democracy camp and pro-Beijing camp each set out three lists aiming for three of the five seats while the largest parties from the both camps, the Democratic Party and the Democratic Alliance for the Betterment and Progress of Hong Kong each put two lists for the contest and the Association for Democracy and People's Livelihood and Hong Kong Federation of Trade Unions, the smaller parties having strong roots in the District Councils put out one list. The other democratic parties which were against the constitutional reform package boycotted the election.

== Overall results ==
Party	Seats	Contesting list(s)	Votes	%
Democratic	2	2	545,308	34.3
ADPL	1	1	262,172	16.5
Pro-democracy camp	3	3	807,480	50.7
DAB	1	2	476,875	30.0
FTU	1	1	246,196	15.5
Pro-Beijing camp	2	3	723,071	45.4
Independent	0	1	61,321	3.9
Turnout:			1,591,872	49.4

== Candidates list ==
Legislative Election 2012: District Council (Second)
List	Candidates	Votes	Of total (%)	± from prev.
Democratic	James To Kun-sun Andrew Chiu Ka-yin, Au Nok-hin	316,468	19.88	
DAB	Starry Lee Wai-king Hung Lin-cham, Chan Hok-fung, Chu Lap-wai, Ngan Man-yu	277,143	17.41	
ADPL	Frederick Fung Kin-kei Hui Kam-shing	262,172	16.47	
FTU	Chan Yuen-han Dennis Leung Tsz-wing, Wong Yun-cheong	246,196	15.47	
Democratic	Ho Chun-yan Kwong Chun-yu, Lam Siu-fai	228,840	14.38	
DAB (Civil Force)	Lau Kong-wah	199,732	12.55	
Independent	Pamela Peck Wan-kam	61,321	3.85	
Turnout		1,591,872	49.44	

== Results by districts ==
List	Candidates	HKI	KLW	KLE	NTW	NTE	Total
Democratic	Albert Ho	13.70	8.59	10.72	19.58	14.34	14.38
Democratic	James To	24.57	21.60	20.69	15.48	20.07	19.88
Independent	Pamela Peck	3.77	3.02	3.72	4.35	3.85	3.85
DAB	Lau Kong-wah	3.15	3.11	3.18	20.15	21.42	12.55
ADPL	Frederick Fung	13.42	26.38	15.63	14.47	16.41	16.47
DAB	Starry Lee	28.50	27.62	23.72	9.77	8.98	17.41
FTU	Chan Yuen-han	12.88	9.67	22.33	16.19	14.93	15.47

== See also ==
- Legislative Council of Hong Kong
- Hong Kong legislative elections
- 2012 Hong Kong legislative election
