= 2012 Hong Kong legislative election in Hong Kong Island =

- 9 September 2012

All 7 Hong Kong Island seats to the Legislative Council
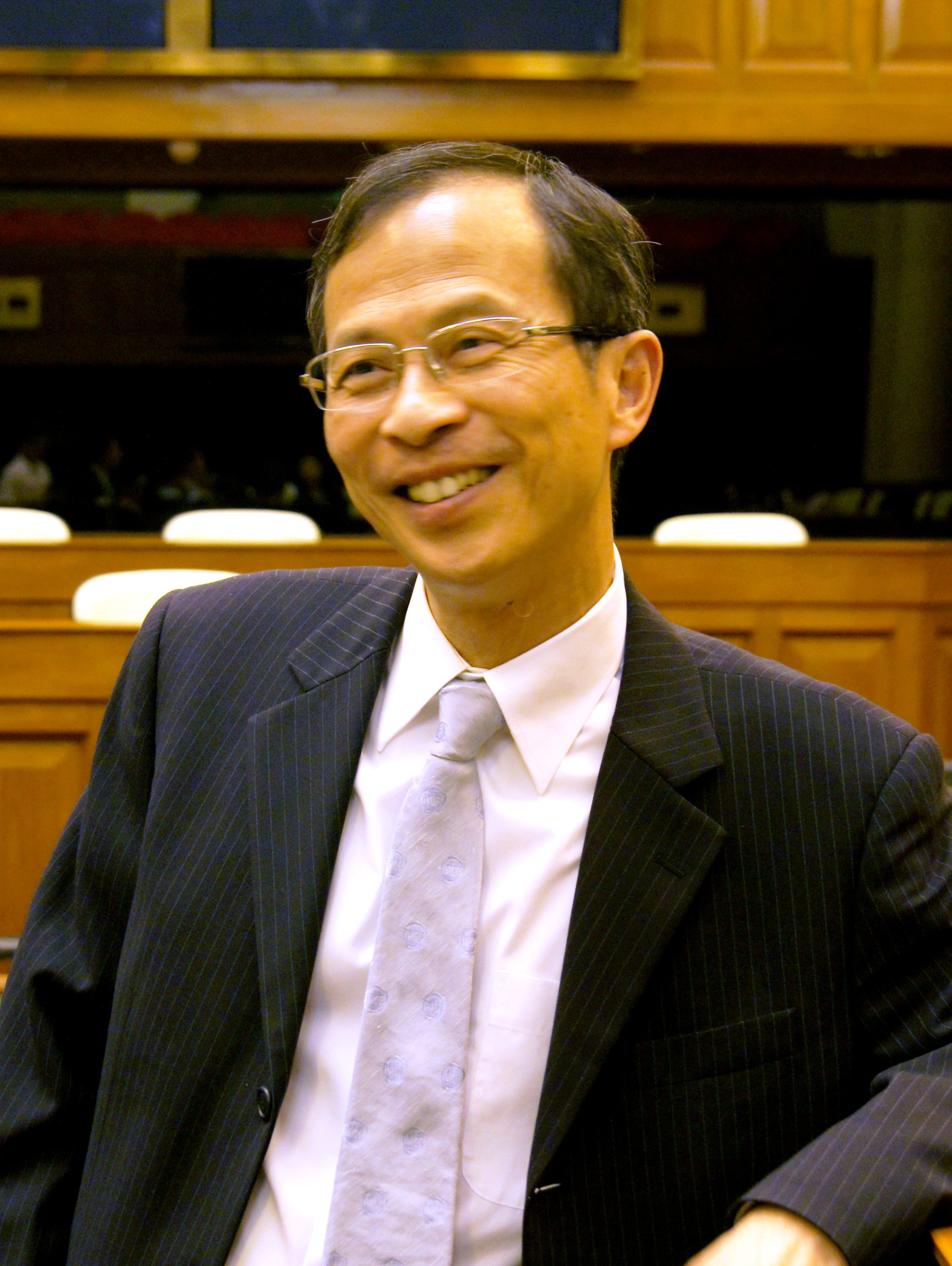

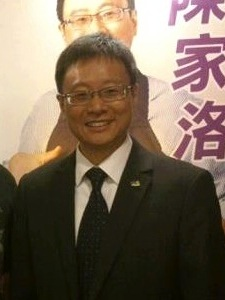

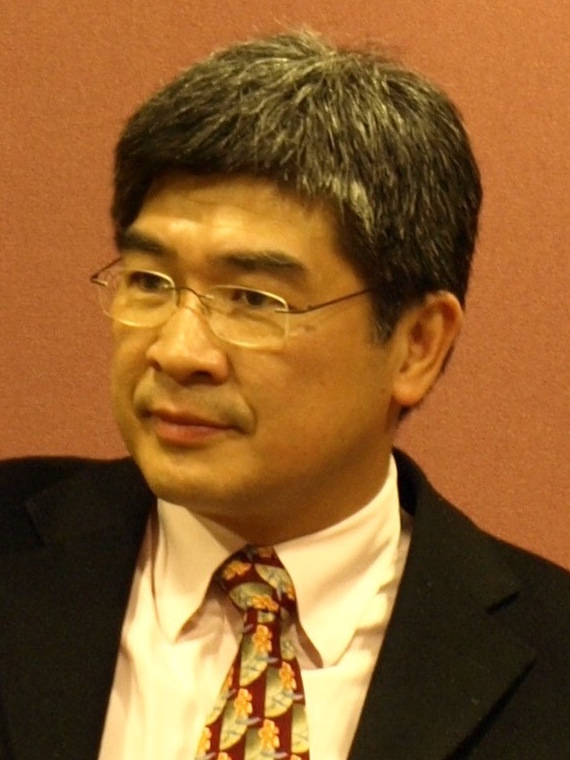

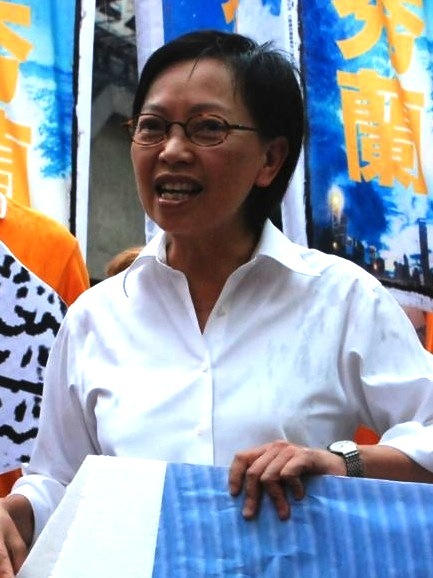

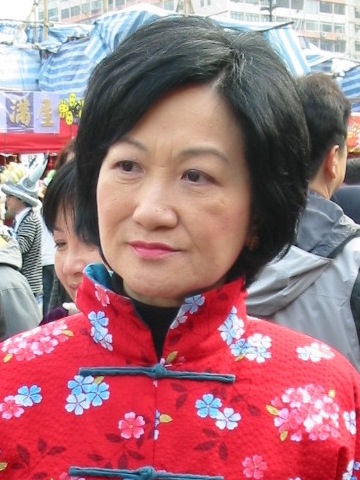

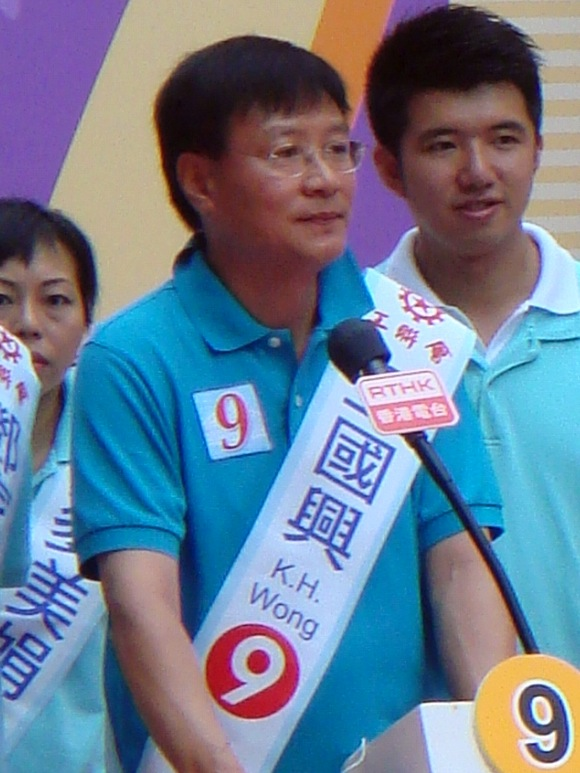
	First party	Second party	Third party
Leader	Jasper Tsang & Christopher Chung	Kenneth Chan	Sin Chung-kai
Party	DAB	Civic	Democratic
Alliance	Pro-Beijing	Pan-democracy	Pan-democracy
Last election	1 seat, 19.3%	2 seats, 26.4%	1 seat, 12.7%
Seats before	1	2	1
Seats won	2	1	1
Seat change	▲1	▼1	Steady
Popular vote	70,418	70,475	40,558
Percentage	21.3%	21.3%	12.3%
Swing	▲2%	▼5.1%	▼0.4%
	Fourth party	Fifth party	Sixth party
Leader	Cyd Ho	Regina Ip	Wong Kwok-hing
Party	Labour	NPP	FTU
Alliance	Pan-democracy	Pro-Beijing	Pro-Beijing
Last election	1 seat, 9.9%	1 seat, 19.5%	N/A
Seats before	1	1	0
Seats won	1	1	1
Seat change	Steady	Steady	▲1
Popular vote	31,523	30,289	27,336
Percentage	9.5%	9.2%	8.3%
Swing	▼0.4%	▼10.3%	N/A
- Party with most votes in each District Council Constituency.

These are the Hong Kong Island results of the 2012 Hong Kong legislative election. The election was held on 9 September 2012 and all 7 seats in Hong Kong Island were contested. The pro-Beijing camp achieved a majority of Island seats for the first time with the Democratic Alliance for the Betterment and Progress of Hong Kong gained two seats with two separate lists led by Tsang Yok-sing and Christopher Chung respectively. Both Civic Party and People Power failed in getting the last seat in whom Tanya Chan placed second on the Civic's candidate list and Christopher Lau were defeated by Wong Kwok-hing from the Federation of Trade Unions. Besides, 24-year-long member Miriam Lau of the Liberal Party also lost in her first attempt of direct election.

== Overall results ==
Before election:

↓
4	2
Pan-democracy	Pro-Beijing

Change in composition:

↓
3	4
Pan-democracy	Pro-Beijing

Party	Seats	Seats change	Contesting list(s)	Votes	%	% change
Civic	1	−1	1	70,475	21.3	−5.1
Democratic	1	0	1	40,558	12.3	−0.4
Labour	1	0	1	31,523	9.5	−0.4
People Power	0	0	1	18,667	5.6	N/A
LSD	0	0	1	3,169	1.0	−2.3
Independent	0	0	2	17,243	5.2	N/A
Pro-democracy camp	3	−1	7	181,635	54.9	−5.0
DAB	2	+1	2	70,418	21.3	+2
NPP	1	0	1	30,289	9.2	−10.3
FTU	1	0	1	27,336	8.3	N/A
Liberal	0	0	1	17,686	5.6	N/A
Independent	0	0	1	2,980	0.9	N/A
Pro-Beijing camp	4	+2	6	148,709	45.0	+5.5
Independent	0	0	1	422	0.1	N/A
Turnout:				330,766	54.7	

== Candidates list ==
Legislative Election 2012: Hong Kong Island
List	Candidates	Votes	Of total (%)	± from prev.
Civic	Chan Ka-lok Tanya Chan	70,475	21.31 (14.29+7.02)	−5.09
Democratic	Sin Chung-kai Yeung Sum, Chai Man-hon, Cheng Lai-king, Leung Suk-ching, Hui Chi-fung	40,558	12.26	−0.44
DAB	Jasper Tsang Yok-sing	36,517	11.04	−8.26
DAB	Christopher Chung Shu-kun Eddie Ting Kong-ho, Jennifer Chow Kit-bing, Kung Pak-cheung, Ngan Chun-lim, Kenny Lee Kwun-yee, Cheng Chi-sing	33,901	10.25	N/A
Labour	Cyd Ho Sau-lan Cheng Sze-lut, Chung Chung-fai	31,523	9.53	−0.37
NPP	Regina Ip Lau Suk-yee Wong Chor-fung, Tse Tsz-kei	30,289	9.16	−10.34
FTU	Wong Kwok-hing Pan Pey-chyou, Chu Ting-lok, Stanley Ho Ngai-kam, Chan Chi-hang	27,336	8.26	N/A
People Power	Christopher Lau Gar-hung, Shiu Yeuk-yuen, Jeff Au Yeung Ying-kit	18,667	5.64	N/A
Liberal	Miriam Lau Kin-yee, Shiu Ka-fai, Lee Chun-keung	17,686	5.35	+4.65
Independent	Lo Wing-lok	16,900	5.11	−1.39
LSD	Avery Ng Man-yuen	3,169	0.96	−2.34
Nonpartisan	Hui Ching-on	2,980	0.90	N/A
Independent	Ng Wing-chun	422	0.13	N/A
Nonpartisan	Ho Kar-tai	343	0.10	N/A
Turnout		330,766	54.69	+4.52

== Results by districts ==
List	Candidates	Central & Western	Wan Chai	Eastern	Southern	Total
Nonpartisan	Hui Ching-on	0.57	0.57	1.24	0.50	0.90
Democratic	Sin Chung-kai	13.80	12.22	11.19	13.60	12.26
Independent	Lo Wing-lok	4.64	4.67	5.19	5.47	5.11
People Power	Christopher Lau	4.96	5.11	5.85	5.91	5.64
DAB	Christopher Chung	4.68	11.15	14.75	3.63	10.25
Independent	Ng Wing-chun	0.22	0.08	0.11	0.11	0.13
Labour	Cyd Ho	9.39	8.84	9.79	9.32	9.53
NPP	Regina Ip	9.06	10.94	8.66	9.64	9.16
FTU	Wong Kwok-hing	6.21	5.02	9.38	8.63	8.26
Civic	Kenneth Chan	21.85	23.11	21.26	20.21	21.31
Nonpartisan	Ho Kar-tai	0.12	0.11	0.09	0.13	0.10
DAB	Jasper Tsang	18.07	10.65	6.03	17.51	11.04
Liberal	Miriam Lau	5.60	6.79	5.40	4.41	5.35
LSD	Avery Ng	0.85	0.73	1.05	0.93	0.96

== See also ==
- Legislative Council of Hong Kong
- Hong Kong legislative elections
- 2012 Hong Kong legislative election
