= Lung Sheung (constituency) =

Constituency of the Wong Tai Sin District Council of Hong Kong

- Elected constituency for the Sham Shui Po District Council
- Boundary of Lung Sheung in Wong Tai Sin District
- District: Wong Tai Sin
- Legislative Council constituency: Kowloon Central
- Population: 19,508 (2019)
- Electorate: 12,438 (2019)

Current constituency
- Created: 1999
- Number of members: One
- Member: (Vacant)

Lung Sheung
- Traditional Chinese: 龍上
Transcriptions
Yue: Cantonese
- Yale Romanization: Lùhng seuhng
- Jyutping: Lung4 soeng6

Lung Sheung is one of the 25 constituencies of the Wong Tai Sin District Council. The seat elects one member of the council every four years. The boundary is loosely based on the area of Upper Wong Tai Sin Estate.

== Councillors represented ==
Election	Member	Party
1999	Lam Man-fai	DAB/FTU
2011	Chan Yuen-han	FTU
2015	Lam Man-fai	FTU
2019	Chan Chun-yue→Vacant	Independent

== Election results ==
=== 2010s ===
Wong Tai Sin District Council Election, 2019: Lung Sheung
Party	Candidate	Votes	%	±%
Independent	Chan Chun-yue	4,460	55.47	
FTU	Lam Man-fai	3,581	44.53	−17.97
Majority		879	10.94	
Turnout		8,096	65.13	
Independent gain from FTU		Swing		

Wong Tai Sin District Council Election, 2015: Lung Sheung
Party	Candidate	Votes	%	±%
FTU	Lam Man-fai	2,798	62.5	–7.5
Democratic	Lam Wai-kei	1,478	33.0	+11.9
Independent	Chow Lai-cheong	204	4.6	
Majority		1,320	29.5	–24.3
Turnout		4,548	39.3	
FTU hold		Swing	–9.7	

Wong Tai Sin District Council Election, 2011: Lung Sheung
Party	Candidate	Votes	%	±%
FTU	Chan Yuen-han	3,456	70.02	
Democratic	Lam Wai-kei	1,039	21.05	
People Power	Edward Yum Liang-hsien	441	8.93	
Majority		2,417	53.77	
FTU hold		Swing		

=== 2000s ===
Wong Tai Sin District Council Election, 2007: Lung Sheung
Party	Candidate	Votes	%	±%
DAB	Lam Man-fai	uncontested		
DAB hold		Swing		

Wong Tai Sin District Council Election, 2003: Lung Sheung
Party	Candidate	Votes	%	±%
DAB	Lam Man-fai	2,478	62.21	
Frontier	Lau Shan-ching	1,505	37.79	
Majority		1,937	24.43	
DAB hold		Swing		

=== 1990s ===
Wong Tai Sin District Council Election, 1999: Lung Sheung
Party	Candidate	Votes	%	±%
DAB	Lam Man-fai	2,190	72.13	
Nonpartisan	Chan Yim-kwong	846	27.87	
Majority		1,344	44.27	
DAB win (new seat)				
