= Raymond Ho =

Raymond Ho Chung-tai SBS MBE MStJ JP
- 何鍾泰

Member of the Legislative Council of Hong Kong
- In office 1 July 1998 – 30 September 2012
- Preceded by: New parliament
- Succeeded by: Lo Wai-kwok
- Constituency: Engineering
- In office 21 December 1996 – 30 June 1998 (Provisional Legislative Council)

Personal details
- Born: 23 March 1939 (age 87) Hong Kong
- Spouse: Teresa Chan Ming-sum
- Education: University of Hong Kong (BS); University of Manchester (PDSE); City, University of London (PhD)
- Occupation: Engineer

Raymond Ho Chung-tai SBS MBE MStJ JP (Chinese: 何鍾泰, born 23 March 1939 in Hong Kong with family roots in Shunde, Guangdong) was, from 1998 to 2012, a member of the Legislative Council of Hong Kong (Legco), representing the engineering industry in functional constituencies seats. During his tenure in the legislature, he was a member of Professional Forum, formerly known as the Alliance a pro-Beijing group in Legco. In 2012, he lost the election to Lo Wai-Kok a member of BPA, a pro-Beijing group.

He is a registered structural engineer and a registered professional engineer in building, civil, environmental, geotechnical and structural engineering. He is the ex-president of Hong Kong Institution of Engineers.

Raymond graduated with a Bachelor of Science degree in engineering from the University of Hong Kong, and a Doctor of Philosophy degree from the City, University of London.

Legislative Council of Hong Kong
New parliament	Member of Provisional Legislative Council; 1997–1998	Replaced by Legislative Council
New parliament	Member of Legislative Council; Representative for Engineering; 1998–2012	Succeeded by Lo Wai-kwok
