= Third Force (Hong Kong) =

The Third Force (Chinese: 第3力量) is a banner running in New Territories West for the 2012 Legislative Council of Hong Kong Election. It was led by Chan Keung, a member of the Guangdong Provincial Chinese People's Political Consultative Conference, who was backed by the rural leaders and several district councillors.

In a police's operation arresting some Wo Shing Wo triad-linked people openly involved in election campaigning in the New Territories, "Shanghai Boy" Kwok Wing-hung, "Little Boy" Cheung Chuen-hon, Ping Shan Rural Committee chairman Tsang Shu-wo and his counterpart on the Ha Tsuen Rural Committee, Tang Lai-tung were arrested. The four were said to be active backers of Chan Keung, who is running for a Legislative Council seat.

The party refused to attend any election debate and failed to gain a seat with 16,767 votes in the election.

== See also ==
- 2012 Hong Kong legislative election
- Wo Shing Wo
