= Christina Lee =

Hong Kong politician (born 1977)

- Chinese: 李美辰

Personal details
- Born: 1977 (age 48–49)
- Parent: Joseph Lee Chung-tak (father)
- Education: University of Chicago; Oxford University; University of Bristol

Christina Maisenne Lee (Chinese: 李美辰, born 1977) is a Hong Kong politician.

== Personal life and business career ==
Lee is the daughter of businessman Joseph Lee Chung-tak, who founded the Wofoo Group, a plastics manufacturing firm. She grew up in Hong Kong, attending Maryknoll Convent School where she was captain of the swim team, and also participating in a variety of extracurricular activities including ballet and piano. Unlike many of her friends, she was initially enthusiastic about going abroad for further studies, after completing Form 4 in Hong Kong she chose to attend high school in the United States and then entered the University of Chicago. She graduated there with a degree in public policy before going on to Oxford University to earn a master's in comparative social policy. She later earned a Master of Education from the University of Bristol.

Lee returned to Hong Kong in 1999 to work as a management consultant. In 2002, she quit that job to take a position in the family business Wofoo Group, overseeing personnel issues and charitable activities. She also joined the Hong Kong Chinese Importers' and Exporters' Association, becoming a member of the Standing Committee and participating in youth training activities. Lee is married and has two sons and one daughter. She is an advocate of breastfeeding.

== In politics ==
Lee serves as a member of the following government bodies:

- Social Enterprise Advisory Committee, 15 January 2010 to 14 January 2016
- Advisory Committee on Admission of Quality Migrants and Professionals, 1 July 2010 to 30 June 2014
- Action Committee Against Narcotics, 1 January 2011 to 31 December 2014
- Town Planning Board, 1 April 2012 to 31 March 2014

In November 2011, she ran for an uncontested seat as a member of the Election Committee in the Import and Export Subsector, making her one of the 1,200 Hong Kong electors entitled to vote for the Chief Executive of Hong Kong in the 2012 election. Later in 2012 she ran in the Legislative Council election as the fourth candidate on the Democratic Alliance for the Betterment and Progress of Hong Kong list in New Territories West, but was not elected.
