= Albert Lai =

- 黎廣德
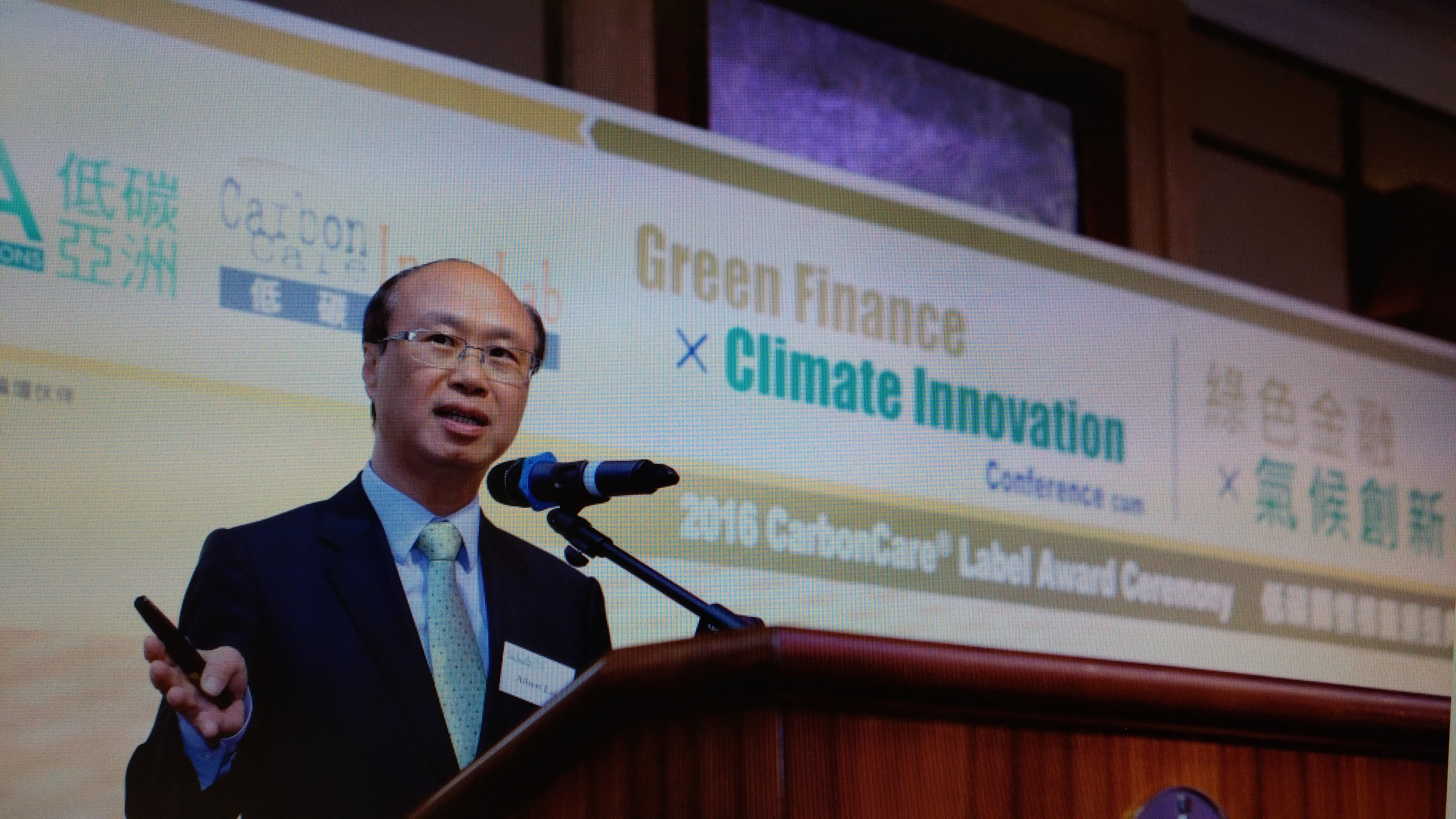

Personal details
- Born: British Hong Kong
- Education: The University of Hong Kong (B.S., M.Soc.Sci.); Wah Yan College, Kowloon
- Occupation: Climate Strategy Leader
- Profession: Climate and Sustainability Expert

Ir Albert Lai (traditional Chinese: 黎廣德; simplified Chinese: 黎广德; Jyutping: lai^{4} gwong^{2}-dak^{1}) is the former Climate Strategy Leader of Deloitte China, the co-founder and CEO of Carbon Care Asia, a mission-driven business in carbon strategy and sustainability innovation. He is the founding chairman of The Professional Commons, an independent public policy think-tank and the Hong Kong People’s Council for Sustainable Development, as well as founding vice-chairman of the Civic Party. He also served as a member of the Commission on Strategic Development, and a member of the Strategy Sub-Committee, Council for Sustainable Development, Hong Kong SAR Government.

Lai has played an active role in the engineering sector and in the environmental movement. Having led the Hong Kong NGO delegation to the World Summit on Sustainable Development in 2002, he has taken a leading role in advocating the implementation of sustainable development strategies in Hong Kong.

For over two decades up to 2019, he was one of the primary movers in a range of civil society initiatives in the fields of environmental protection, urban planning, heritage conservation, poverty alleviation and sustainability reporting in Hong Kong.

He also led the Hong Kong NGO Delegation to the United Nations Climate Change Conference in Bali in 2007, in Copenhagen in 2009 and in Paris in 2015.

Lai is an engineer by profession and a Fellow of the UK Institution of Civil Engineers since 2016. He co-founded the China Water Company, an infrastructure investment firm backed by international investors, in 1996 and served as its managing director until 2004. In response to the urgent need for urban water infrastructure in China in early 1990s, The China Water Company was a pioneer in harnessing foreign capital to invest and develop water and sewage treatment plants across China for the benefit of millions of city residents.

Lai received a Bachelor of Science (Engineering) degree in 1980 and a Master of Social Science degree in Urban Studies in 1984 from the University of Hong Kong.

== Public positions ==
- HKSAR Chief Executive Election Committee, Member, Engineering Sector (since 2006)
- The Professional Commons, Founding Chairman (2007–2011); Policy Convenor (since 2011)
- Hong Kong People’s Council for Sustainable Development, Founding Chairman

(2003 to 2008); Councillor (since 2008)

- Conservancy Association, Chairman (2000 to 2004); Director (since 2005)
- Civic Party, Founding Vice-chairman (2006 to July 2012)
- Engineers Without Borders HK, Convenor and Founding Chairman (2008–2010)
- Hong Kong Council of Social Service, Vice-chairman, Policy Research & Advocacy Committee (since 2004) and Member of Executive Committee (2007–2009)
- Conservancy Association Centre for Heritage, Founding Chairman (2004 to 2006);Director (since 2007)
- Hong Kong Core Values Declaration, one of the three Initiators (2004)
- Strategy Sub-Committee, Council for Sustainable Development, HKSAR Government, Member (2003–2009)
- Commission on Strategic Development, HKSAR, Member (2005 to 2007)
- Stakeholder Council of Global Reporting Initiative, Amsterdam, Member (2004 to 2007)
- Policy & Public Education Committee, Oxfam Hong Kong, Member (2006 to 2007)
- People’s Panel for West Kowloon, Core Member (2004–2009)
- Citizen Envisioning @ Harbour, Convenor (2004 to 2007)
- HKU Court, Member (2004 to 2005)
- HKU Convocation Standing Committee, Member (2002 to 2005)
