= 2000 Hong Kong legislative election =

Elections in Hong Kong

- 10 September 2000

All 60 seats to the Legislative Council 31 seats needed for a majority
- Registered: 3,055,378 (GC) ▲9.30%
- Turnout: 1,331,080 (43.57%) ▼9.72pp
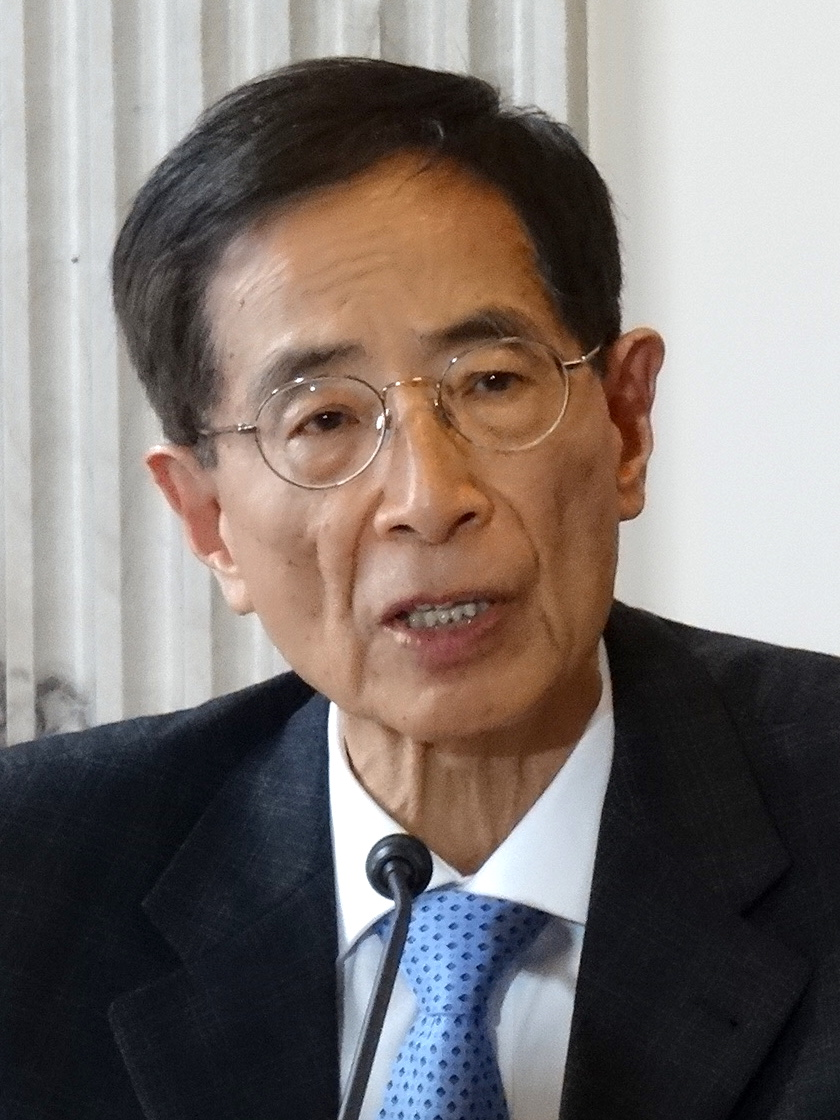

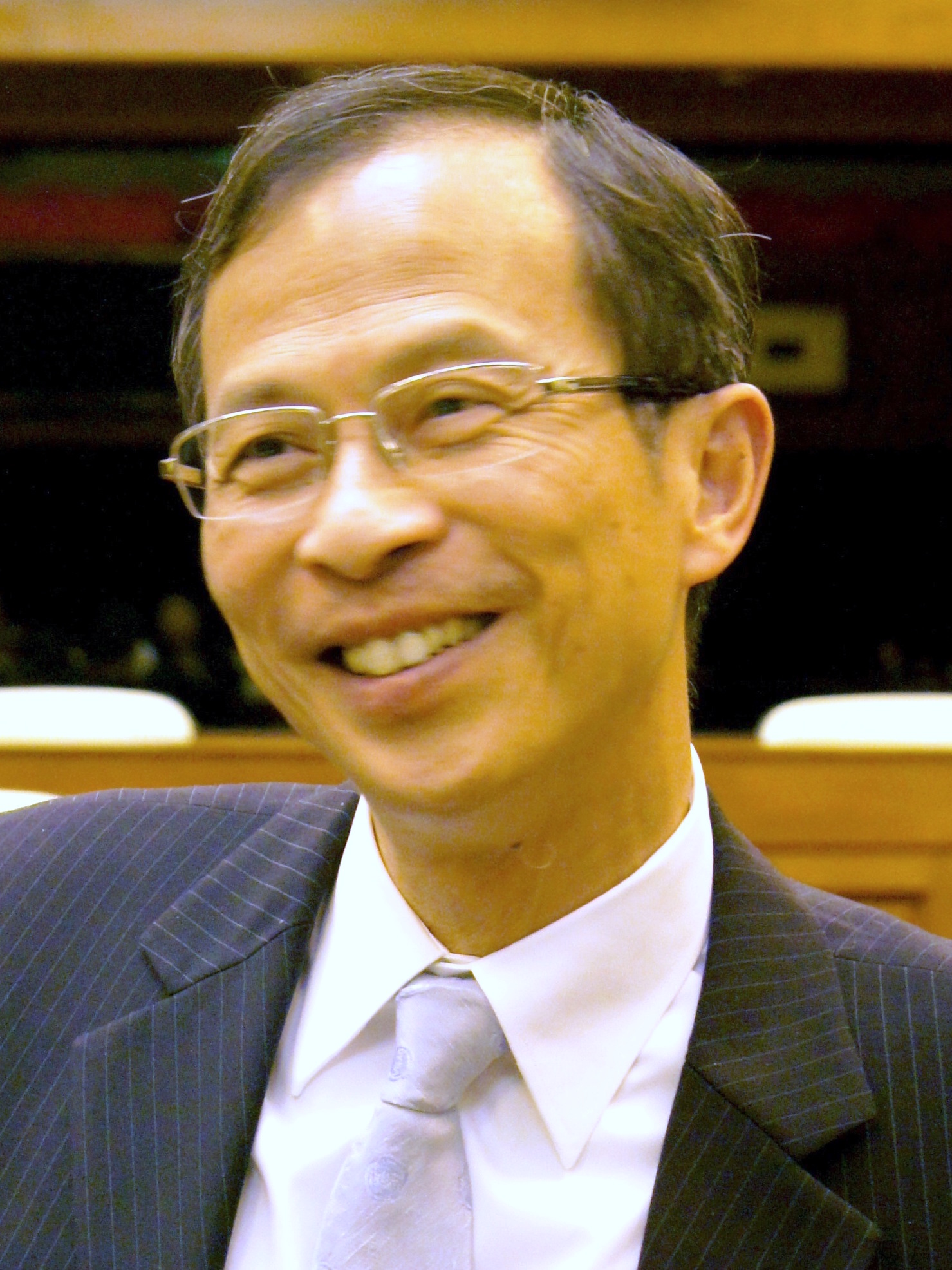

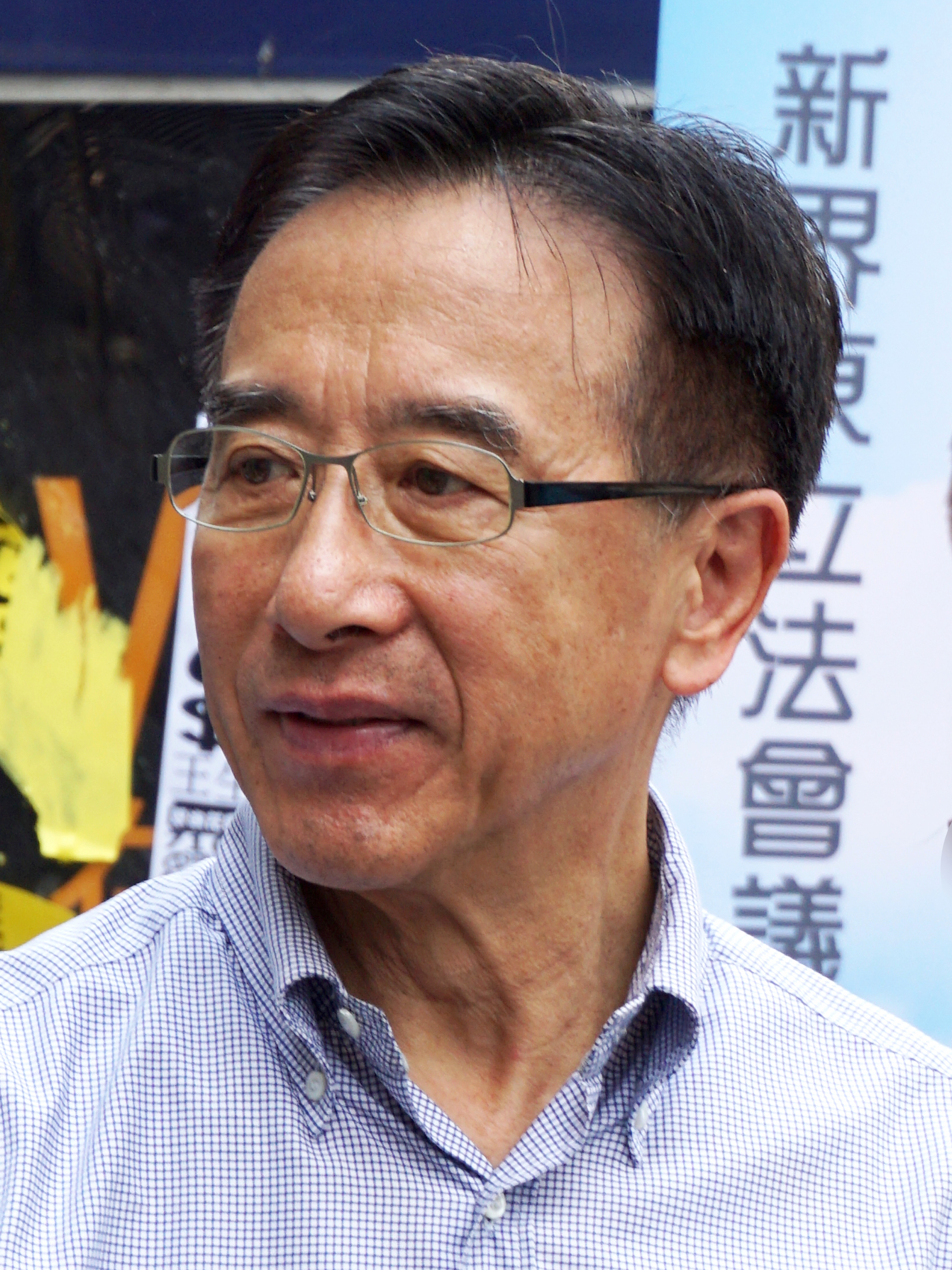

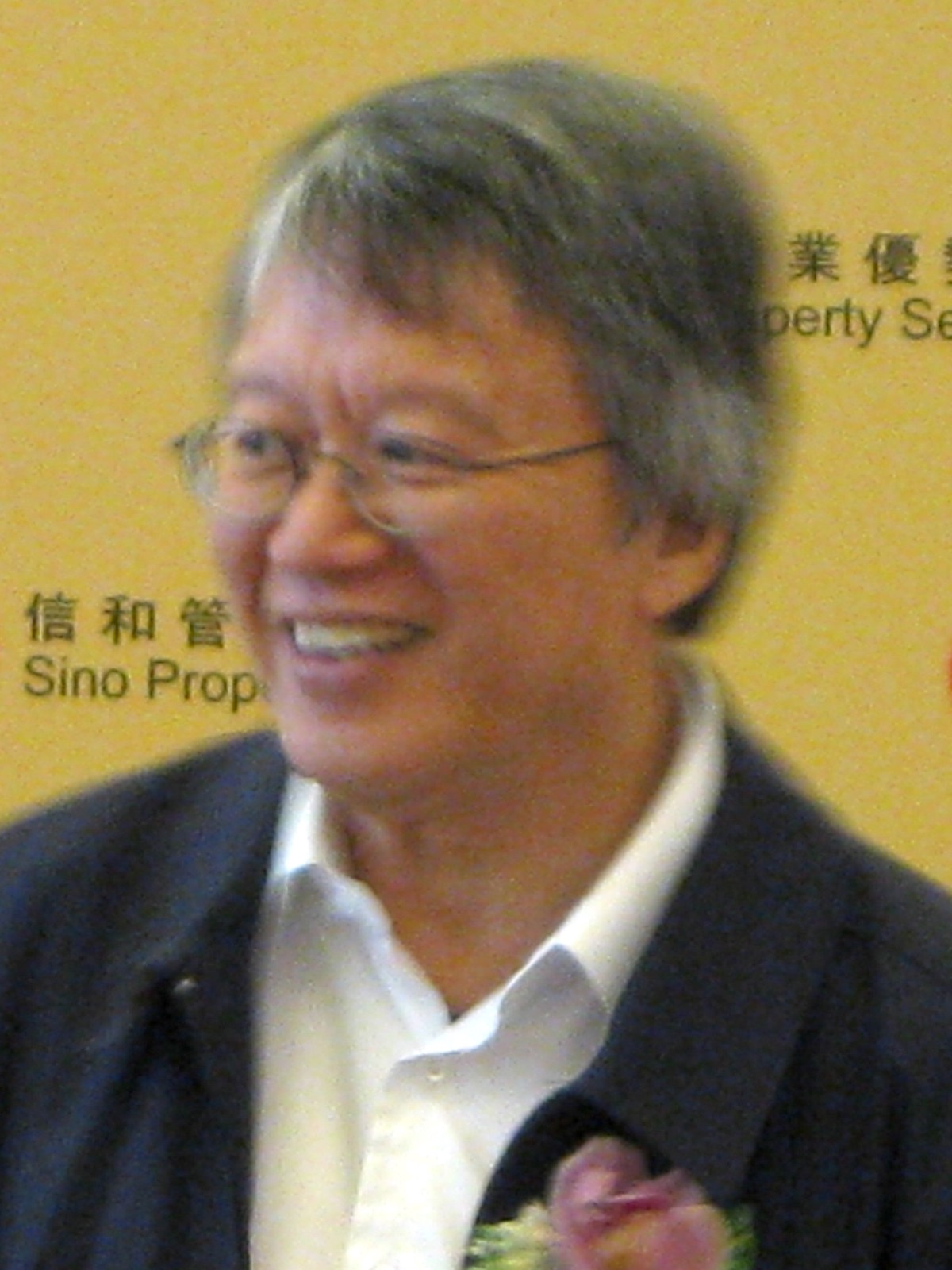

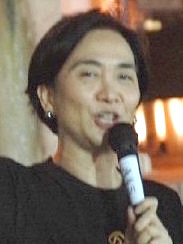

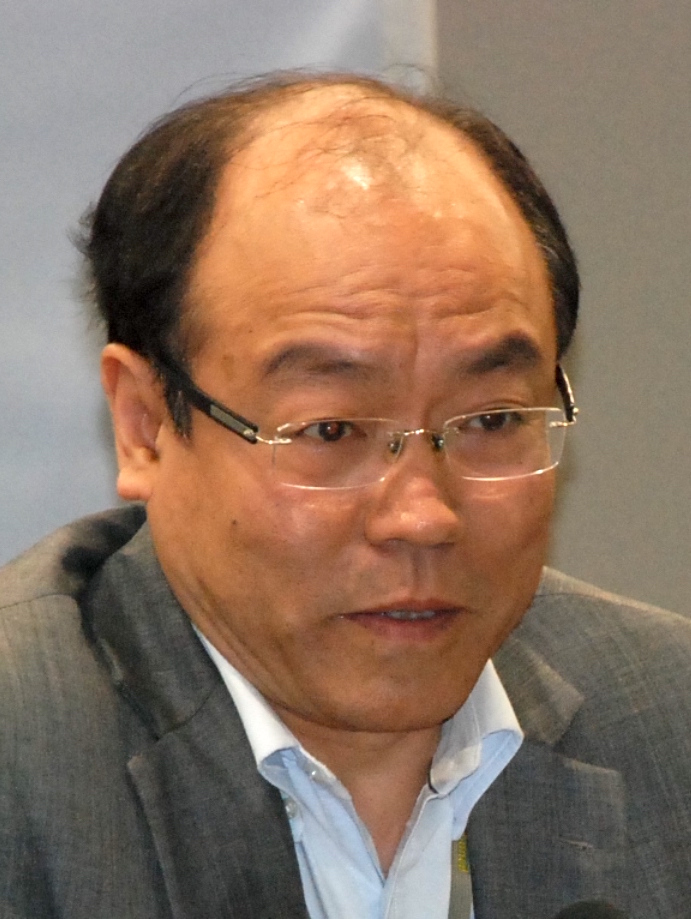

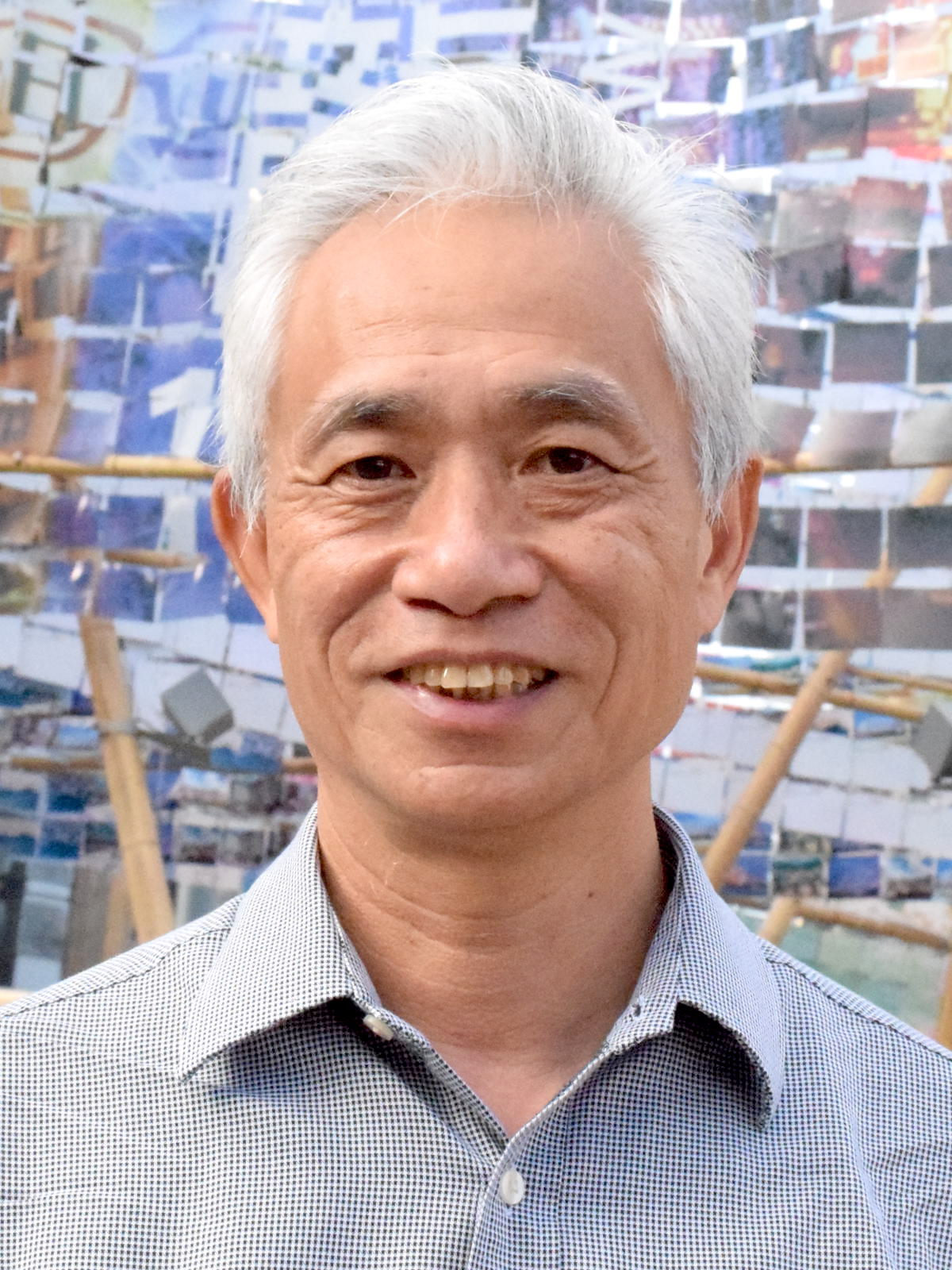

	First party	Second party	Third party
Leader	Martin Lee	Tsang Yok-sing	James Tien
Party	Democratic	DAB	Liberal
Alliance	Pan-democracy	Pro-Beijing	Pro-Beijing
Leader's seat	Hong Kong Island	Kowloon West	Commercial (First)
Last election	13 seats, 42.87%	10 seats, 25.23%	10 seats, 3.4%
Seats won	12	11	8
Seat change	Steady	▲1	▼2
Popular vote	417,873	374,780	24,858
Percentage	31.66%	28.40%	1.88%
Swing	▼11.21pp	▲3.17pp	▼1.52pp
	Fourth party	Fifth party	Sixth party
Leader	Ambrose Lau	Lau Chin-shek	Emily Lau
Party	HKPA	CTU	Frontier
Alliance	Pro-Beijing	Pan-democracy	Pan-democracy
Leader's seat	Election Committee	Kowloon West	New Territories East
Last election	5 seats	Did not contest	3 seats, 10.03%
Seats won	4	2	2
Seat change	▼1	Steady	Steady
Popular vote	25,773	96,752	89,529
Percentage	1.95%	7.33%	6.78%
Swing	N/A	N/A	▼3.25pp
	Seventh party	Eighth party	Ninth party
Leader	Frederick Fung	Leung Yiu-chung	Ng Ching-fai
Party	ADPL	NWSC	New Forum
Alliance	Pan-democracy	Pan-democracy	Pro-Beijing
Leader's seat	Kowloon West	New Territories West	Election Committee
Last election	0 seat, 3.99%	Did not contest	New party
Seats won	1	1	1
Seat change	▲1	Steady	▼1
Popular vote	62,717	59,348	21,103
Percentage	4.75%	4.50%	1.60%
Swing	▲0.76pp	N/A	N/A
- Elected candidates by each constituency
Party control before election
Pro-Beijing camp
Party control after election
Pro-Beijing camp

The 2000 Hong Kong Legislative Council election was held on 10 September 2000 for members of the 2nd Legislative Council (LegCo) of the Hong Kong Special Administrative Region (HKSAR). The election returned 24 members from directly elected geographical constituencies, 6 seats from the Election Committee constituency and 30 members from functional constituencies, of which 9 uncontested.

The election saw the decline in turnout rate from 53.29 percent in 1998 to 43.57 percent. The Democratic Party was able to maintain the largest party status in the legislature by retaining 12 seats, despite its vote share fell sharply by eight percent, if including Lau Chin-shek from the Hong Kong Confederation of Trade Unions (CTU) running in the same ticket with Democrat James To in Kowloon West, from 42 percent in 1998 to 34 percent in 2000.

In contrast, the pro-Beijing rival Democratic Alliance for the Betterment of Hong Kong (DAB) raised its vote share over two years by five percent, to 29.6 percent if including Tang Siu-tong from the Hong Kong Progressive Alliance (HKPA). As a result, the DAB won 11 seats, a sharp increase of three seats from the previous election, making it the second largest political party in the legislature, despite an alleged corruption scandal involving its vice-chairman Cheng Kai-nam at the peak of the campaign. Cheng did not take his office and a by-election in December was won by a pro-democracy independent Audrey Eu.

The pro-democracy camp won 21 seats in total, of which 16 of those returned from the directly elected geographical constituencies, one seat more than the previous election which secured the one-thirds vote to veto any government's proposal of any constitutional amendment. As of 2026, these were the last elections won by a party other than the Democratic Alliance for the Betterment and Progress of Hong Kong which began to dominate Hong Kong politics from 2004.

== Change in composition ==
According to the Annex II of the Basic Law of Hong Kong, the number of the Election Committee constituency indirectly elected by the 800-member Election Committee would reduce from 10 seats to 6 seats, while the directly elected geographical constituency seats would increase from 20 to 24. As a result, each geographical constituency except the New Territories East was added one extra seat.

After the two municipal councils, the Urban Council and Regional Council, were abolished in 1999, the two corresponding functional constituencies were also abolished and replaced by the Information Technology and Catering seats.

== Parties and candidates ==
A total of 155 candidates representing ten political parties and candidates who were independents or not non-affiliated ran for the total number of 60 seats. 88 of whom ran in the 24 directly elected geographical constituencies, 57 for the 30 indirectly elected functional constituencies and 10 were nominated for the 6 Election Committee seats.

- The Democratic Party, chaired by Martin Lee, was the largest pro-democracy party holding 13 seats in the first Legislative Council term. Despite being perceived as anti-Beijing, the party's manifesto stated clear support for China's sovereignty over Hong Kong and Hong Kong's status as an "indivisible part of China." Nevertheless, the party was strongly identified with democratic principles, including "democracy, freedom, human rights and the rule of law." It believed in a rapid pace for Hong Kong's democratic development. The party filled tickets in all five geographical constituencies besides its candidacies in the functional constituencies including Education, Social Welfare and Information Technology. It was also the first time the party deployed separate tickets in the New Territories West in hope of winning three seats by purchasing seats with remainder votes under the Hare quota system.
- The Liberal Party, chaired by James Tien, was the party representing big-business interests. Its manifesto was "Energise Our Economy, Enrich Our Lives." Although its economic inclinations were the opposite of the Democratic Alliance for the Betterment of Hong Kong (DAB), it also had pro-Beijing sympathies like the latter. After the defeat of former chairman Allen Lee in direct election in 1998, the party only filled two tickets in the geographical constituencies while its core members remained relying heavily on the business sectors of the functional constituencies.
- The Democratic Alliance for the Betterment of Hong Kong (DAB), chaired by Tsang Yok-sing, was the pro-Beijing party representing the Beijing interests in Hong Kong. It called for gradual and step-by step progress towards democratisation and supported for social welfare improvements, including greater spending on education, housing, employee retraining which had given it strong grassroots supports. Holding 10 seats in the first Legislative Council term, the DAB won five directly elected seats in the 1998 election, taking advantages from the proportional representation system installed by Beijing.
- The Hong Kong Progressive Alliance (HKPA), chaired by Ambrose Lau, was a small pro-Beijing party which had a pro-business stance which assuring another voting block support of Beijing interests. It heavily relied on the seats in the indirectly elected functional constituencies and Election Committee seats. In the election, the party filled a ticket in New Territories East for the first time and a candidate with rural background Tang Siu-tong in the DAB ticket in New Territories West.
- The Frontier, headed by Emily Lau was active on human rights and environmental issues and routinely criticised both Hong Kong and Beijing governments on matters involving individual rights and freedoms. The Frontier believed the Basic Law should be redrafted and advocated democracy and freedom in China and Hong Kong. The party had strong support in New Territories East where saw its two incumbents Emily Lau and Cyd Ho got elected. Ho ran in Hong Kong Island in the coming election, targeting retiring Citizens Party's Christine Loh's seat.
- The Hong Kong Confederation of Trade Unions (CTU), presided by Lau Chin-shek, was a pro-democracy labour union. It had strong pro-grassroots and pro-labour inclination besides its pro-democracy stance. It had two incumbents Lau Chin-shek and Lee Cheuk-yan who ran as Democratic Party and The Frontier candidates respectively in the last election. After quitting the Democratic Party, Lau would run in the joint ticket with Democratic Party's James To in Kowloon West in the coming election.
- The Neighbourhood and Worker's Service Centre (NWSC) had its sole legislator Leung Yiu-chung ran for his re-election in New Territories West. Largely pro-democracy and pro-grassroots, the NWSC had its strong base in public housing estates in Kwai Chung.
- The New Century Forum, headed by Ng Ching-fai, was newly formed small party with a pro-middle class inclination. It had two members in the first Legislative Council term, Ng Ching-fai and Ma Fung-kwok, both were elected through the Election Committee, despite the two were running for re-election as nonpartisans. The party would also run in Hong Kong Island and New Territories East with tickets led by former civil servant David Lan and Law Cheung-kwok respectively.
- The Hong Kong Association for Democracy and People's Livelihood (ADPL), chaired by Frederick Fung, was a major party before 1997 until it lost all its seat in the first Legislative Council election in 1998. It had a moderate pro-democracy stance and strong pro-grassroots inclination. It filled in one ticket in its strong base Kowloon West in the coming election with chairman Frederick Fung and vice-chairman Bruce Liu.
- The April Fifth Action was a small socialist group in which "Longhair" Leung Kwok-hung was its most well-known figure. It called for radical political changes with a strong anti-government rhetoric. Leung Kwok-hung would be running in the New Territories East in the coming election.

== Retiring incumbents ==
Ambrose Cheung, representing the Provisional Urban Council resigned from the Legislative Council as protest to the government's decision on abolishing the two municipal councils, Urban Council and Regional Council and their corresponding Legislative Council constituencies in 2000. No by-election was held due to the short period before the general election.

Constituency	Departing incumbents	Party
Medical	Leong Che-hung	Independent
Health Services	Michael Ho Mun-ka	Democratic
Labour	Lee Kai-ming	FLU
Labour	Chan Wing-chan	DAB
Real Estate and Construction	Ronald Joseph Arculli	Liberal
Import and Export	Hui Cheung-ching	HKPA
District Council (First)	Ip Kwok-him	DAB

== General result ==

Before election:

↓
20	1	39
Pro-democracy	V.	Pro-Beijing

Change in composition:

↓
21	39
Pro-democracy	Pro-Beijing

Overall Summary of the 10 September 2000 Legislative Council of Hong Kong election results
Parties and allegiances	Geographical constituencies				Functional constituencies				ECC seats	Total seats	±
Parties and allegiances	Votes	%	±pp	Seats	Votes	%	±pp	Seats	ECC seats	Total seats	±
Democratic Alliance for the Betterment of Hong Kong	374,780	28.40	▲3.17	7	1,493	1.68	▲1.30	3	1	11	▲2
Liberal Party	24,858	1.88	▼1.52	0	4,416	4.96	▲3.23	8	0	8	▼2
Hong Kong Progressive Alliance	25,773	1.95	N/A	1	133	0.15	▼0.41	1	2	4	▼1
New Century Forum	21,103	1.60	N/A	0	–	–	–	–	1	1	▼1
Pro-government individuals and others	14,534	1.10	–	0	30,571	34.34		13	2	15	−
Total for pro-Beijing camp	461,048	34.94	▲4.55	8	30,571	41.12	▲9.01	25	6	39	0
Democratic Party	417,873	31.66	▼11.21	9	40,624	45.63	▼17.44	3	–	12	0
Hong Kong Confederation of Trade Unions	96,752	7.33	N/A	2	–	–	–	–	–	2	0
The Frontier	89,529	6.78	▼3.25	2	–	–	–	–	–	2	0
Hong Kong Association for Democracy and People's Livelihood	62,717	4.75	▲0.75	1	–	–	–	–	–	1	▲1
Neighbourhood and Worker's Service Centre	59,348	4.50	N/A	1	–	–	–	–	–	1	0
April Fifth Action	18,235	1.38	N/A	0	−	−	−	−	−	0	0
Pro-democracy individuals and others	54,795	4.15	–	1	9,066	10.18		2	–	3	−
Total for pro-democracy camp	799,249	60.56	▼5.59	16	49.690	55.81	▼9.74	5	–	21	▲1
Non-partisan individuals and others	59,397	4.50		0	2,729	3.07		0	–	0	−
Total	1,319,694	100.00		24	89,032	100.00		30	6	60	0
Valid votes	1,319,694	99.14	▼0.22		89,032	96.66	▼1.31				
Invalid votes	11,386	0.86	▲0.22		3,080	3.34	▲1.31				
Votes cast / turnout	1,331,080	43.57	▼9.72		92,112	56.50	▼7.00				
Registered voters	3,055,378	100.00	▲9.30		163,030	100.00	▲33.04				
9 candidates in 9 functional constituencies were elected unopposed to the Legislative Council.

(Total votes added up by this reference)

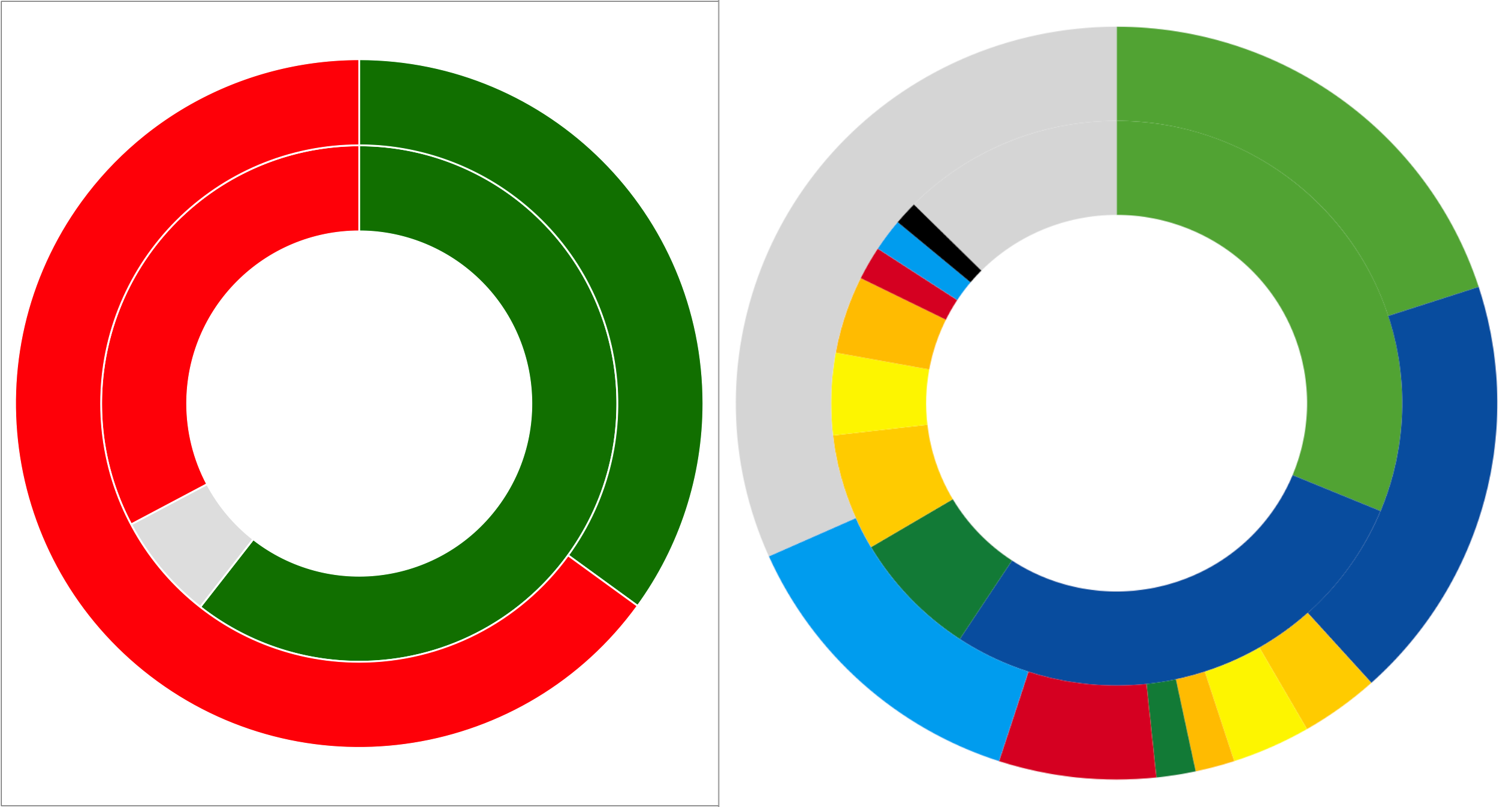
Ring charts of the election results showing popular vote against seats won, coloured in green (Pro-democracy camp) and red (Pro-Beijing camp) on the left and the party colours on the right. Seats won in the election (outer ring) against number of votes (inner ring).

=== Vote summary ===
Popular vote
Democratic	31.66%
DAB	28.40%
CTU	7.33%
Frontier	6.78%
ADPL	4.75%
NWSC	4.50%
PA	1.95%
Liberal	1.88%
NCF	1.60%
AFA	1.38%
Independents	9.75%

=== Seat summary ===
Seats
Democratic	20.00%
DAB	18.33%
Liberal	13.33%
PA	6.67%
CTU	3.33%
Frontier	3.33%
ADPL	1.67%
NWSC	1.67%
NCF	1.67%
Independents	30.00%

=== Incumbents defeated ===
Four incumbents lost re-election.

Party	Name	Constituency
Liberal	Edward Ho Sing-tin	Architectural, Surveying and Planning
Liberal	Ho Sai-chu	Election Committee
Democratic	Lee Wing-tat	New Territories West
HKPA	Fung Chi-kin	Financial Services
New Forum	Ma Fung-kwok	Election Committee

== Results breakdown ==
=== Geographical constituencies (24 seats) ===
Voting System: Closed party-list proportional representation with the largest remainder method and Hare Quota.

Hong Kong Island (香港島) (5 seats)

List No.	Party/Allegiance	Votes Received	%	elected	not elected
1		9,896	3.8		Tsang Kin-shing, Manuel Chan Tim-shing, Steve Chan Kwok-leung
2		6,967	2.7		Angel Leung On-kay
3	DAB	72,617	27.8	Cheng Kai-nam, Choy So-yuk	Suen Kai-cheong, Christopher Chung Shu-kun, Yeung Wai-foon
4		14,534	5.6		Jennifer Chow Kit-bing
5	Independent	6,398	2.5		Paul Tse Wai-chun
6	New Forum	14,329	5.5		David Lan Hong-tsung, Fung Ho-keung, Chan Choi-hi, Regina Yeung Sum-yu
7	Frontier	25,988	10.0	Cyd Ho Sau-lan	
8		1,132	0.4		Andrew Shuen Pak-man
9		15,419	5.9		Fung Leung-lo
10		1,434	0.5		Allen Yung Chan-lung
11	Democratic	92,074	35.3	Martin Lee Chu-ming, Yeung Sum	Kam Nai-wai, Joseph Lai Chi-keong, Cheng Lai-king
		260,788	100.0		

Kowloon West (九龍西) (4 seats)

List No.	Party/Allegiance	Votes Received	%	elected	not elected
1	ADPL	62,717	35.2	Frederick Fung Kin-kee	Liu Sing-lee
2	DAB	41,942	23.5	Tsang Yok-sing	Chung Kong-mo, Pun Kwok-wah, Wong Wai-chuen
3	Democratic/CTU	73,540	41.3	Lau Chin-shek, James To Kun-sun	
		178,199	100.0		

Kowloon East (九龍東) (4 seats)

List No.	Party/Allegiance	Votes Received	%	elected	not elected
1		9,805	4.3		Lam Hoi-shing
2	DAB	108,587	47.4	Chan Yuen-han, Chan Kam-lam	Lam Man-fai, Angelis Chan Joy-kong
3	Democratic	103,863	45.3	Szeto Wah, Li Wah-ming	Wu Chi-wai, Andrew To Kwan-hang
4		7,023	3.1		Shi Kai Biu, Lam Wai Yin
		229,278	100.0		

New Territories West (新界西) (6 seats)

List No.	Party/Allegiance	Votes Received	%	elected	not elected
1	Liberal	9,408	2.74		David Yeung Fuk-kwong
2	NWSC	59,348	17.27	Leung Yiu-chung	
3	Democratic	43,613	12.69	Albert Chan Wai-yip	Cosmas Kwong Kwok-chuen
4	CTU	52,202	15.19	Lee Cheuk-yan	
5		3,274	0.95		Angela Man Yun-fei
6	DAB	101,629	29.58	Tam Yiu-chung, Tang Siu-tong	Leung Che-cheung, Chau Chuen-heung, Chan Yau-hoi, Au Yeung Po-chun
7	Democratic	38,472	11.20	Ho Chun-yan	Josephine Chan Shu-ying, Cheung Yuet-lan, Catherine Wong Lai-sheung
8	Democratic	35,648	10.38		Lee Wing-tat, Wong Bing-kuen
		343,594	100.00		

New Territories East (新界東) (5 seats)

List No.	Party/Allegiance	Votes Received	%	elected	not elected
1	Democratic	25,971	8.44	Wong Sing-chi	Chow Wai-tung, Wong Leung-hi
2	DAB	66,943	21.75	Lau Kong-wah	Wan Yuet-kau, Wong Mo-tai, Wan Chung-ping, Li Kwok-ying
3		7,945	2.58		Brian Kan Ping-chee
4	HKPA	8,835	2.87		Choy Kan-pui, Ling Man-hoi, Cheng Chun-wo, Ho Sau-mo
5	Frontier	63,541	20.64	Emily Lau Wai-hing	Richard Tsoi Yiu-cheong
6	New Forum	6,774	2.20		Law Cheung-kwok
7	Democratic	49,242	16.00	Andrew Cheng Kar-foo	Gary Fan Kwok-wai, Shirley Ho Suk-ping, Leung Wing-hung, Kwan Wing-yip
8		44,899	14.59	Andrew Wong Wang-fat	
9	Liberal	15,450	5.02		Lau Hing-kee, Leung Chi-wai, Susana Ho Shu-tee
10	April Fifth Action	18,235	5.92		Leung Kwok-hung
		307,835	100.00		

=== Functional Constituencies (30 seats) ===
Voting systems: Different voting systems apply to different functional constituencies, namely for the Heung Yee Kuk, Agriculture and Fisheries, Insurance and Transport, the preferential elimination system of voting; and for the remaining 24 FCs used the first-past-the-post voting system.

Results of the Functional Constituencies
Constituency	Incumbent	Result	Candidate(s)
Heung Yee Kuk	Lau Wong-fat (Liberal)	Incumbent hold	Lau Wong-fat (Liberal) uncontested
Agriculture and Fisheries	Wong Yung-kan (DAB)	Incumbent hold	Wong Yung-kan (DAB) uncontested
Insurance	Bernard Charnwut Chan	Incumbent hold	Bernard Charnwut Chan uncontested
Transport	Miriam Lau Kin-yee (Liberal)	Incumbent hold	Miriam Lau Kin-yee (Liberal) 76.26% Thomas Pang Cheung-wai (DAB) 23.74%
Education	Cheung Man-kwong (PTU/Democratic)	Incumbent hold	Cheung Man-kwong (PTU/Democratic) 86.29% Lee Kit-kong 13.71%
Legal	Margaret Ng Ngoi-yee (Independent)	Incumbent hold	Margaret Ng Ngoi-yee (Independent) 60.75% Anthony Chow Wing-kin (Independent) 39.25%
Accountancy	Eric Li Ka-cheung (Independent)	Incumbent hold	Eric Li Ka-cheung (Independent) 64.55% Edward Chow Kwong-fai (Independent) 22.75% Peter Chan Po-fun(Independent) 12.70%
Medical	Leong Che-hung (Independent)	Incumbent retired Independent gain	Lo Wing-lok (Independent) 39.96% Dennis Lam Shun-chiu (Independent) 32.29% Kwok Ka-ki (Independent) 19.20% So Kai-ming (Independent) 8.55%
Health Services	Michael Ho Mun-ka (Democratic)	Incumbent retired Independent gain	Michael Mak Kwok-fung (Independent) 43.60% Thomas Wong Kwok-shing (Independent) 29.09% Alice Tso Shing-yuk 27.31%
Engineering	Raymond Ho Chung-tai	Incumbent hold	Raymond Ho Chung-tai 60.69% Luk Wang-kwong 39.31%
Architectural, Surveying and Planning	Edward Ho Sing-tin (Liberal)	Incumbent lost re-election Independent gain	Kaizer Lau Ping-cheung 39.88% Kenneth Law Kin-chung (Independent) 32.61% Edward Ho Sing-tin (Liberal) 27.51%
Labour (3 seats)	Lee Kai-ming (Nonpartisan)	Incumbent retired Nonpartisan gain	Li Fung-ying (Nonpartisan) 283; Leung Fu-wah (Nonpartisan) 259; Chan Kwok-keung (DAB) 226; Leung Suet-fong 102
Labour (3 seats)	Chan Wing-chan (DAB)	Incumbent retired Nonpartisan gain	Li Fung-ying (Nonpartisan) 283; Leung Fu-wah (Nonpartisan) 259; Chan Kwok-keung (DAB) 226; Leung Suet-fong 102
Labour (3 seats)	Chan Kwok-keung (DAB)	Incumbent hold	Li Fung-ying (Nonpartisan) 283; Leung Fu-wah (Nonpartisan) 259; Chan Kwok-keung (DAB) 226; Leung Suet-fong 102
Social Welfare	Law Chi-kwong (Democratic)	Incumbent hold	Law Chi-kwong (Democratic) 65.93% Grace Leung Yuet-ming (Nonpartisan) 34.07%
Real Estate and Construction	Ronald Joseph Arculli (Independent)	Incumbent retired Independent gain	Abraham Shek Lai-him (Independent) 75.48% Jimmy Tse Lai-leung (Independent) 24.52%
Tourism	Howard Young (Liberal)	Incumbent hold	Howard Young (Liberal) 45.07% Joseph Tung Yao-chung (Nonpartisan) 32.40% Francis Bagaman (Nonpartisan) 22.53%
Commercial (First)	James Tien Pei-chun (Liberal)	Incumbent hold	James Tien Pei-chun (Liberal) uncontested
Commercial (Second)	Philip Wong Yu-hong	Incumbent hold	Philip Wong Yu-hong uncontested
Industrial (First)	Kenneth Ting Woo-shou (Liberal)	Incumbent hold	Kenneth Ting Woo-shou (Liberal) 57.22% Chan Siu-king (Nonpartisan) 42.78%
Industrial (Second)	Lui Ming-wah	Incumbent hold	Lui Ming-wah uncontested
Finance	David Li Kwok-po	Incumbent hold	David Li Kwok-po 73.55% Leo Kung Lin-cheng 26.45%
Financial Services	Fung Chi-kin	Incumbent lost re-election Nonpartisan gain	Wu King-cheong 53.47% Fung Chi-kin (Progressive Alliance) 40.18% Irene So Wai-yin 6.35%
Sports, Performing Arts, Culture and Publication	Timothy Fok Tsun-ting	Incumbent hold	Timothy Fok Tsun-ting uncontested
Import and Export	Hui Cheung-ching (Progressive Alliance)	Incumbent hold	Hui Cheung-ching (Progressive Alliance) uncontested
Textiles and Garment	Sophie Lau Yau-fun (Liberal)	Incumbent hold	Sophie Lau Yau-fun (Liberal) uncontested
Wholesale and Retail	Selina Chow Liang Shuk-yee (Liberal)	Incumbent hold	Selina Chow Liang Shuk-yee (Liberal) 75.40% Lau Chi-wing 24.60%
Information Technology	Sin Chung-kai (Democratic)	Incumbent hold	Sin Chung-kai (Democratic) 73.69% Kan Wing-kay 26.31%
Catering	New constituencies		Tommy Cheung Yu-yan (Liberal) 53.59% Leung Kwok-cheong 26.11% David Ng Tak-leung (DAB) 20.30%
District Council	New constituencies		Ip Kwok-him (DAB) 57.39% Cosmas Chiang Sai-cheong (Liberal) 42.61%

=== Election Committee (6 seats) ===
No.	Party	Candidate	Votes	%
21	Independent	Ma Fung-kwok	376	52.29
22	Independent	Shiu Sin-por	360	50.07
23	Independent	Ng Ching-fai	401	55.77
24	HKPA	David Chu Yu-lin	464	64.53
25	DAB	Yeung Yiu-chung	490	68.15
26	Independent	Rita Fan Hsu Lai-tai	651	90.54
27	Independent	Ho Ka-cheong	117	16.27
28	Independent	Ng Leung-sing	483	67.18
29	HKPA	Ambrose Lau Hon-chuen	594	82.61
30	Liberal	Ho Sai-chu	378	52.57
