= List of Provisional Legislative Council of Hong Kong members =

This is a list of Members elected to the Provisional Legislative Council at the 1996, held on 24 March.

== Composition ==
Affiliation	Election	At dissolution
Liberal Party	10	12
Democratic Alliance for the Betterment of Hong Kong (DAB)	10	11
Hong Kong Progressive Alliance	6	9
Association for Democracy and People's Livelihood (ADPL)	4	4
New Hong Kong Alliance (NHKA)	2	2
Hong Kong Federation of Trade Unions (FTU)	1	1
Federation of Hong Kong and Kowloon Labour Unions (FLU)	1	1
Liberal Democratic Federation of Hong Kong (LDF)	3	0
Civil Force	1	0
Independent	22	21
Total	60	60

== List of Members ==
The following table is a list of LegCo members elected on 24 March 1996.

Key to changes since legislative election:

^{a} = change in party allegiance
^{b} = by-election

Elected Members	Elected Party	Political Alignment	Born	Remarks
Rita Fan	Independent	Pro-Beijing	20 September 1945	President of the PLC
Wong Siu-yee^{a}	LDF	Pro-Beijing	4 July 1953	
James Tien	Liberal	Pro-Beijing	8 January 1947	
David Chu^{a}	LDF	Pro-Beijing	5 March 1943	
Ho Sai-chu^{a}	Independent	Pro-Beijing	6 June 1937	
Edward Ho	Liberal	Pro-Beijing	2 December 1938	
Raymond Ho	Independent	Pro-Beijing	23 March 1939	
Ng Leung-sing	Independent	Pro-Beijing	11 July 1949	
Ng Ching-fai	Independent	Pro-Beijing	20 November 1939	
Eric Li	Independent	Pro-Beijing	23 May 1953	
David Li	Independent	Pro-Beijing	13 March 1939	
Lee Kai-ming	FLU	Pro-Beijing	11 October 1937	
Allen Lee	Liberal	Pro-Beijing	24 April 1940	
Elsie Tu	Independent	Pro-Beijing	2 June 1913	
Selina Chow	Liberal	Pro-Beijing	25 January 1945	
Peggy Lam	Independent	Pro-Beijing	2 May 1928	
Henry Wu	HKPA	Pro-Beijing	23 August 1951	
Ngai Shiu-kit	Liberal	Pro-Beijing	14 November 1924	
Henry Tang	Liberal	Pro-Beijing	6 September 1952	
Ronald Joseph Arculli	Liberal	Pro-Beijing	2 January 1939	
Yuen Mo	Independent	Pro-Beijing	18 November 1941	
Ma Fung-kwok	Independent	Pro-Beijing	22 July 1955	
Cheung Hon-chung	DAB	Pro-Beijing	25 May 1958	
Tso Wong Man-yin	HKPA	Pro-Beijing	30 October 1944	
Leung Chun-ying	Independent	Pro-Beijing	12 August 1954	
Leong Che-hung	Independent	Pro-Beijing	23 April 1939	
Sophie Leung^{a}	Independent	Pro-Beijing	9 October 1945	
Mok Ying-fan	ADPL	Pro-democracy	15 January 1951	
Hui Yin-fat	Independent	Moderate	28 April 1936	
Chan Choi-hi	Independent	Pro-Beijing	15 January 1956	
Chan Yuen-han	DAB	Pro-Beijing	15 November 1946	
Chan Wing-chan	DAB	Pro-Beijing	7 July 1935	
Chan Kam-lam	DAB	Pro-Beijing	22 January 1949	
Tsang Yok-sing	DAB	Pro-Beijing	14 May 1947	
Cheng Kai-nam	DAB	Pro-Beijing	29 May 1950	
Frederick Fung	ADPL	Pro-democracy	17 March 1953	
Andrew Wong	Independent	Moderate	11 December 1943	
Philip Wong	NHKA	Pro-Beijing	23 December 1938	
Kennedy Wong	Independent	Pro-Beijing	23 February 1963	
Howard Young	Liberal	Pro-Beijing	30 March 1948	
Charles Yeung	HKPA	Pro-Beijing	19 December 1934	
Yeung Yiu-chung	DAB	Pro-Beijing	7 November 1951	
Ip Kwok-him	DAB	Pro-Beijing	8 November 1951	
Chim Pui-chung	Independent	Pro-Beijing	24 September 1946	
Bruce Liu	ADPL	Pro-democracy	8 October 1958	
Lau Kong-wah^{a}	Civil Force	Pro-Beijing	22 June 1957	
Lau Wong-fat	Liberal	Pro-Beijing	15 October 1936	
Miriam Lau	Liberal	Pro-Beijing	27 April 1947	
Ambrose Lau	HKPA	Pro-Beijing	16 July 1947	
Choy Kan-pui	HKPA	Pro-Beijing	5 August 1929	
Paul Cheng	Independent	Pro-Beijing	19 October 1936	
Cheng Yiu-tong	FTU	Pro-Beijing	14 October 1948	
Tang Siu-tong	HKPA	Pro-Beijing	26 September 1942	
Timothy Fok	Independent	Pro-Beijing	14 February 1946	
Kan Fook-yee	NHKA/FSHK	Pro-Beijing	14 June 1936	
Ngan Kam-chuen	DAB	Pro-Beijing	12 December 1947	
Lo Suk-ching	Independent	Pro-Beijing	22 June 1950	
Law Cheung-kwok	ADPL	Pro-democracy	26 September 1949	
Maria Tam^{b}	LDF	Pro-Beijing	2 November 1945	Resigned and replaced by Choy So-yuk
Tam Yiu-chung	DAB	Pro-Beijing	15 December 1949	

== See also ==
- 1996 Hong Kong Provisional Legislature election
