= 2004 Hong Kong legislative election =

- 12 September 2004

All 60 seats to the Legislative Council 31 seats needed for a majority
- Opinion polls
- Registered: 3,207,227 (GC) ▲4.97%
- Turnout: 1,784,406 (55.64%) ▲12.07pp

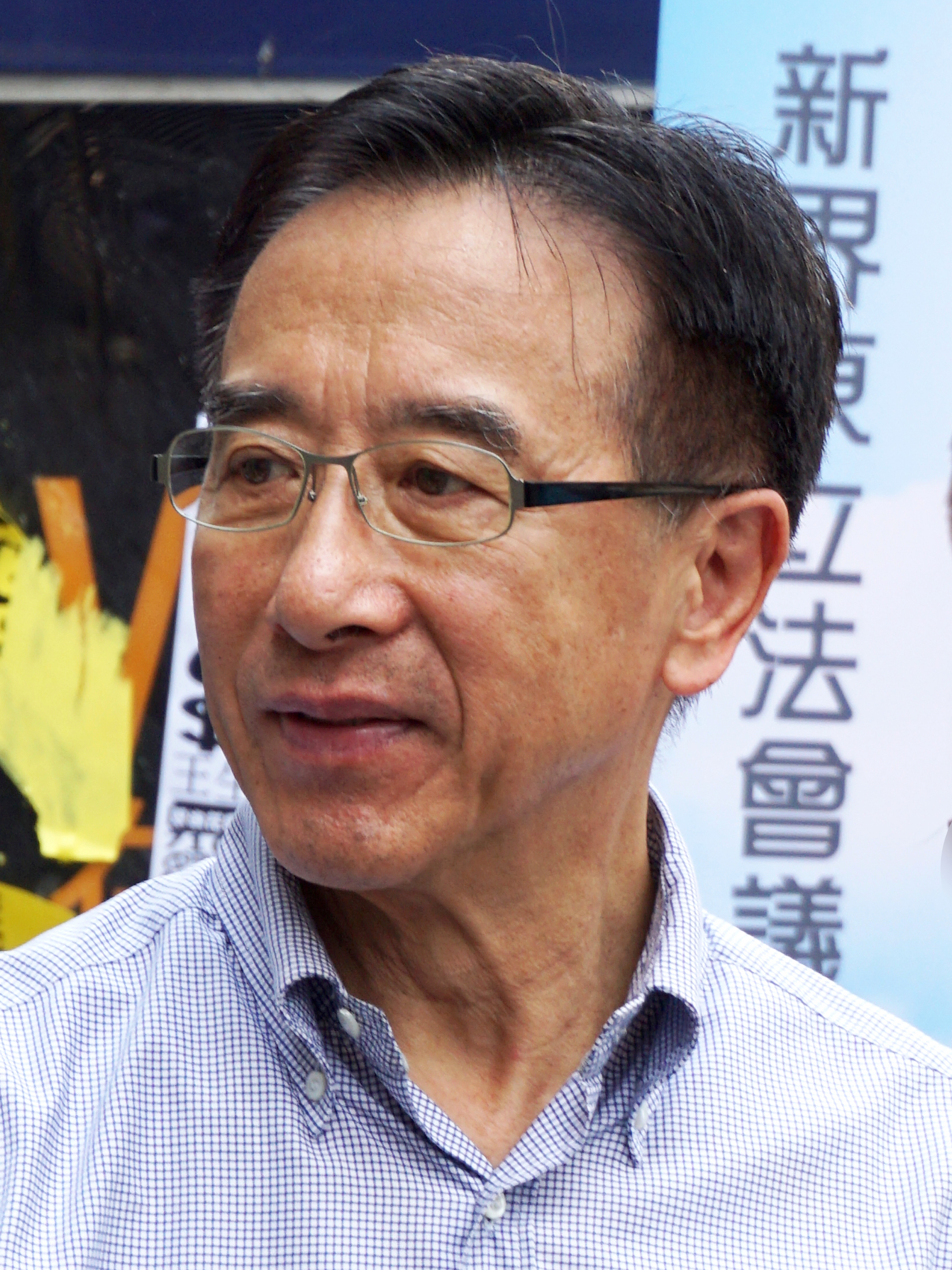

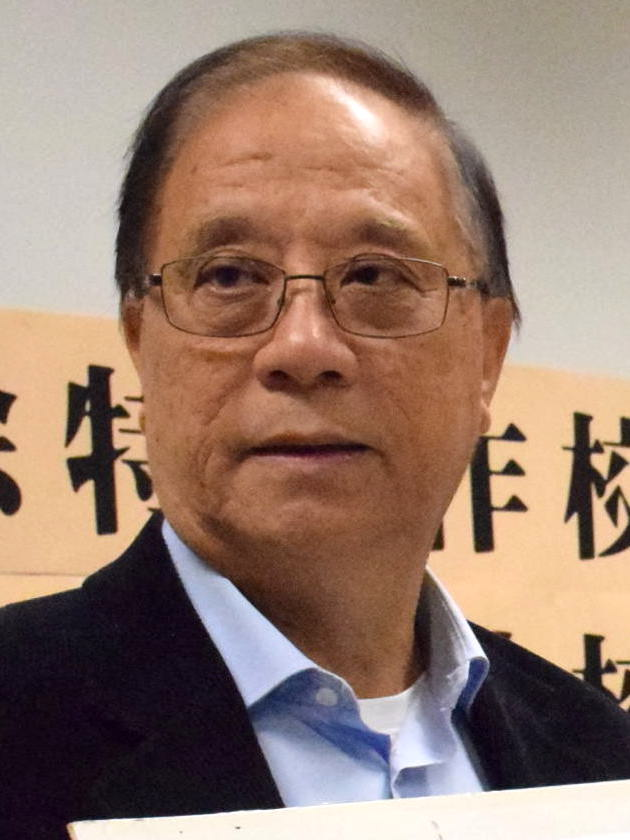

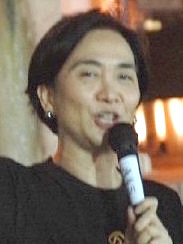

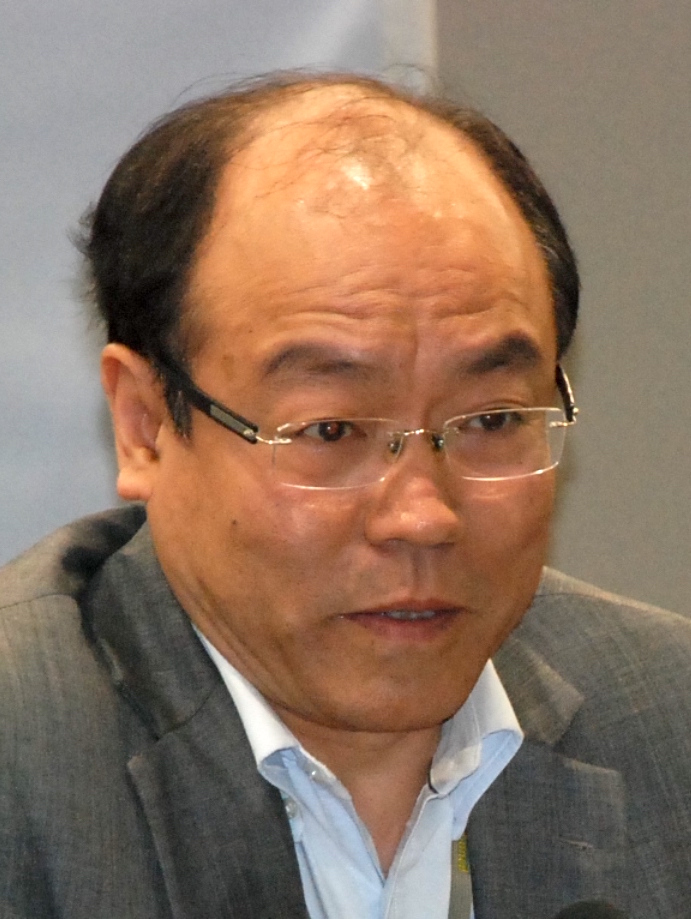

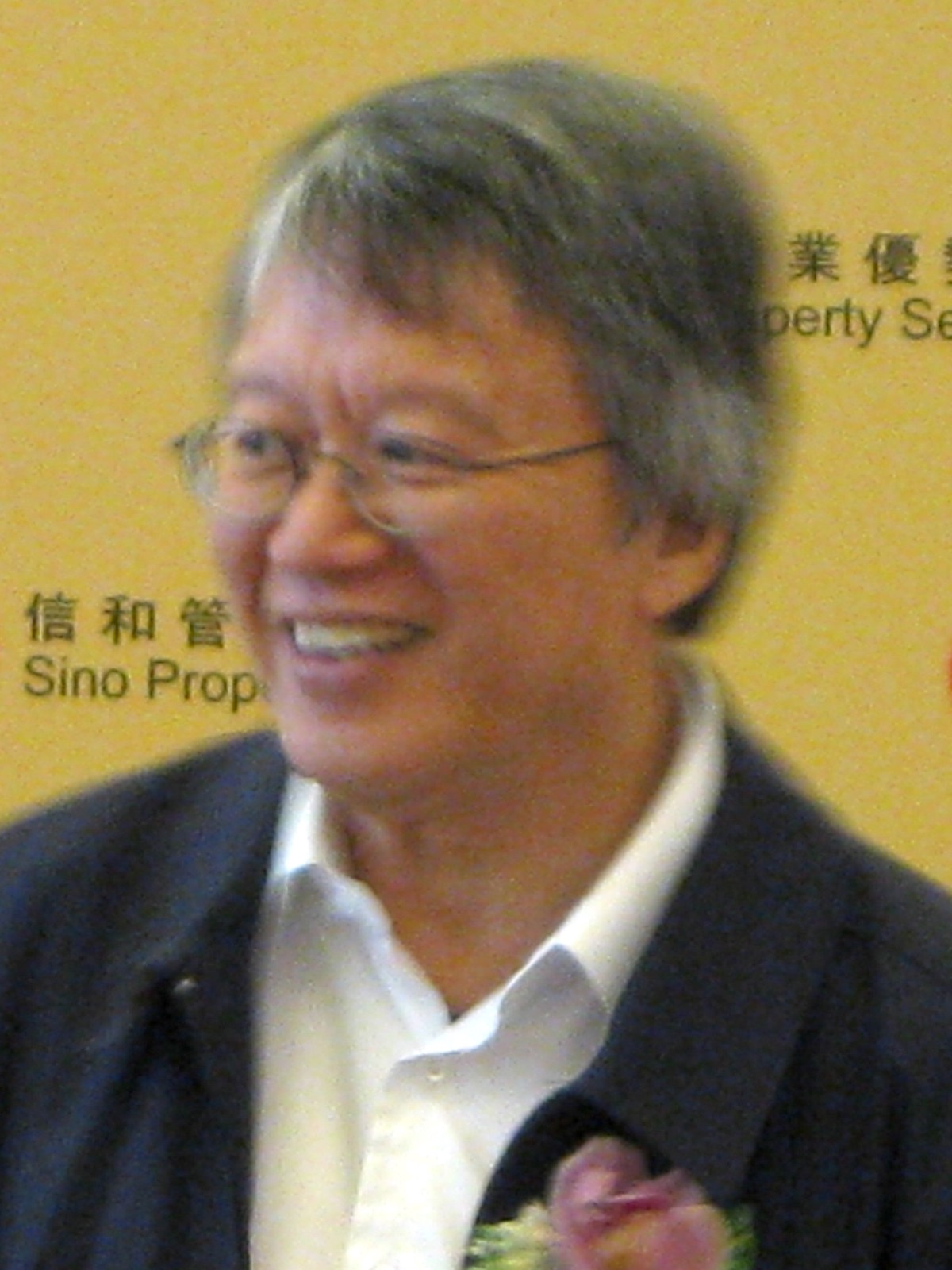

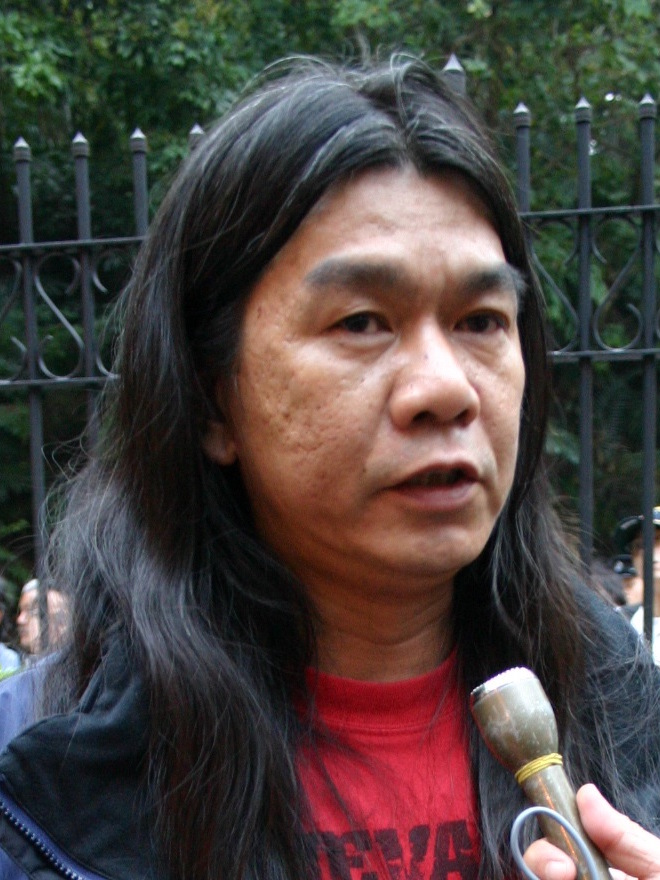

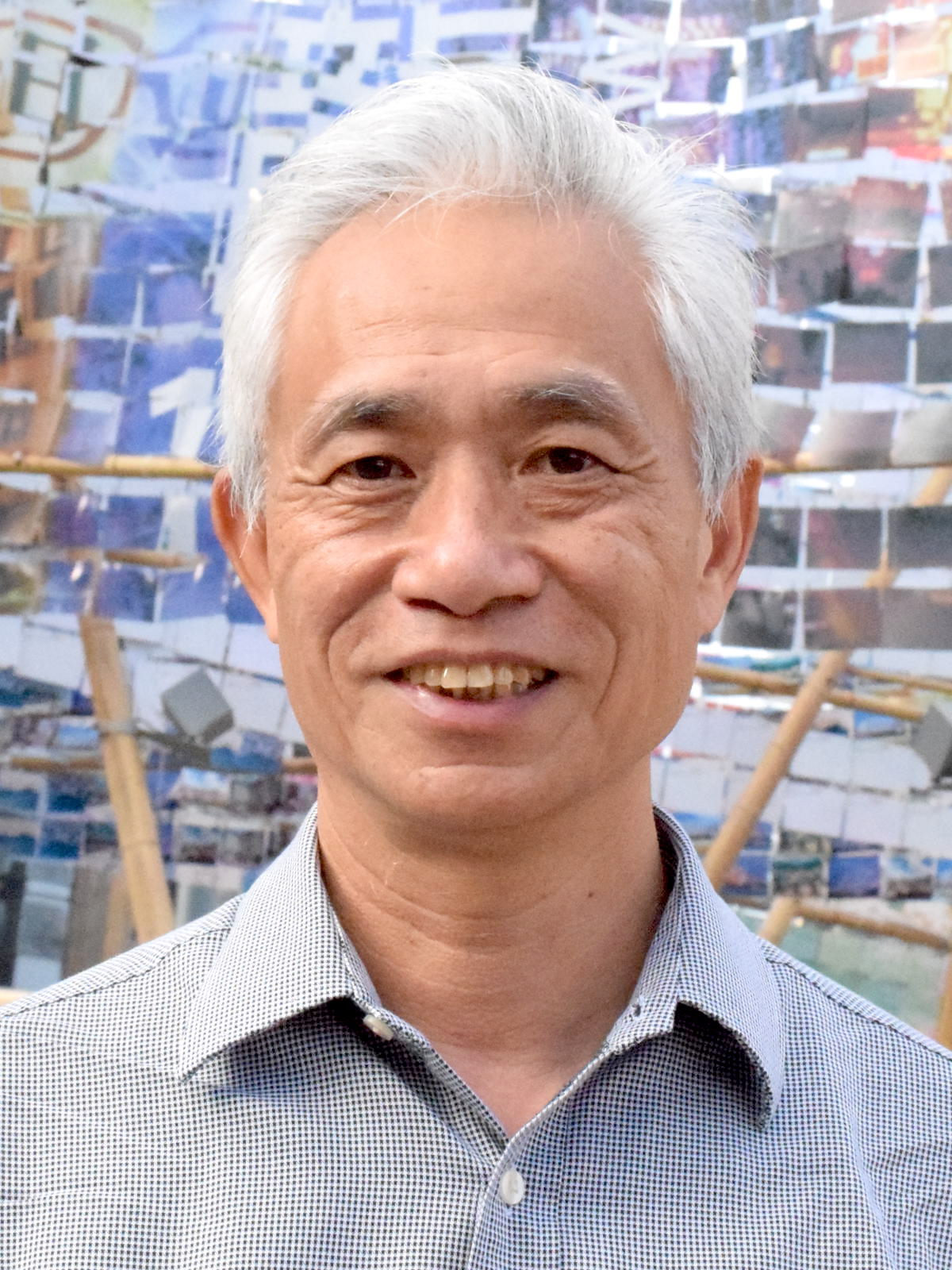
	First party	Second party	Third party
Leader	Ma Lik	James Tien	Yeung Sum
Party	DAB	Liberal	Democratic
Alliance	Pro-Beijing	Pro-Beijing	Pan-democracy
Leader's seat	Hong Kong Island	New Territories East	Hong Kong Island
Last election	11 seats, 28.40%	7 seats, 1.88%	13 seats, 31.74%
Seats won	12	10	9
Seat change	▲2	▲2	▼2
Popular vote	454,827	118,997	445,988
Percentage	25.49%	6.72%	25.19%
Swing	▼2.91pp	▲4.84pp	▼6.47pp
	Fourth party	Fifth party	Sixth party
Leader	Emily Lau	Frederick Fung	Lau Chin-shek (ran as independent)
Party	Frontier	ADPL	CTU
Alliance	Pan-democracy	Pan-democracy	Pan-democracy
Leader's seat	New Territories East	Kowloon West	Kowloon West
Last election	2 seats, 6.78%	1 seat, 4.75%	2 seats, 7.33%
Seats won	1	1	1
Seat change	▼1	Steady	Steady
Popular vote	121,900	74,671	69,844
Percentage	6.89%	4.22%	3.95%
Swing	▲0.11pp	▼0.53pp	▼3.38pp
	Seventh party	Eighth party	Ninth party
Leader	Leung Kwok-hung	Leung Yiu-chung	Ambrose Lau
Party	April Fifth Action	NWSC	HKPA
Alliance	Pan-democracy	Pan-democracy	Pro-Beijing
Leader's seat	New Territories East	New Territories West	Retired from Election Committee
Last election	0 seat, 1.38%	1 seat, 4.50%	4 seats, 1.95%
Seats won	1	1	0
Seat change	▲1	Steady	▼4
Popular vote	60,925	59,033	14,174
Percentage	3.44%	3.33%	0.80%
Swing	▲2.06pp	▼1.17pp	▼1.15pp
Party control before election
Pro-Beijing camp
Party control after election
Pro-Beijing camp

The 2004 Hong Kong Legislative Council election was held on 12 September 2004 for members of the Legislative Council of Hong Kong (LegCo). The election returned 30 members from directly elected geographical constituencies and 30 members from functional constituencies, of which 11 were unopposed.

An unprecedented number of 3.2 million people registered to vote in the election. The turnout rate was an unprecedented 55.6% with 1,784,406 voters casting ballots, beating the previous record set in 1998 by 200,000 votes. While pro-democratic opposition candidates gained new seats in the legislature, their gains fell short of their expectations.

In the geographical constituencies, candidates from the pro-democratic camp secured 60 percent of the seats in the geographical sectors of the election, taking 18 seats (up from 17) in this category, and 62 percent of the popular vote. On the other hand, the pro-Beijing and pro-business candidates made greater gains, winning 12 directly elected seats (up from 7). In the functional constituencies which the pro-democratic camp sought to abolish, the camp made more gains (from 5 to 7 seats).

Overall, the democrats took 25 seats and the pro-government camp 35 seats. Bills initiated by the government can still be passed on pro-government support alone, but bills originated by members cannot be passed without democratic support, since these bills require absolute majorities in each sector (geographical and functional) of the legislature. Constitutional amendments require a two-thirds vote and thereby also require support from the democratic camp.

Despite the increase in the number of seats returned by geographical constituencies and the record turnout, the Democratic Party lost the status of being the largest political party in the Legislative Council to the pro-government Democratic Alliance for Betterment of Hong Kong, DAB, who secured 12 seats if including the two members who ran under the banner of the Hong Kong Federation of Trade Unions, and pro-business Liberal Party who secured 10 seats, thereby becoming only the third-largest party. Some attributed the poor performance of the pro-democratic camp to tactical miscalculation in vote allocation. This was not helped by some of the democratic parties' personal scandals.

The pro-Beijing and pro-business parties succeeded in retaining the majority in the legislature. However, pro-democracy candidates have maintained the threshold to block changes, if necessary, to the Basic Law of Hong Kong, since a two-thirds vote is required for amendment. The current Legislative Council also saw the entry of more radical members of the pro-democratic camp.

== Change in composition ==
According to the Annex II of the Basic Law of Hong Kong, the 6-seat Election Committee constituency indirectly elected by the 800-member Election Committee would be abolished, while the directly elected geographical constituency seats would increase from 24 to 30, same number of the indirectly elected functional constituencies. As a result, Hong Kong Island and Kowloon East was added one extra seat each, from five to six and four to five respectively, and the New Territories West and New Territories East was added two extra seats each, from six to eight and five to seven respectively, while the number of seats in Kowloon West remained four.

== Background ==
The election came amidst the deteriorating governance and intense debates over constitutional reforms in Hong Kong. The Tung Chee-hwa administration had been embattling with economic recession brought by the 1997 financial crisis and the more prominent SARS outbreak in 2003. Nevertheless, the Tung administration pushed forward the controversial Hong Kong Basic Law Article 23 legislation which outlawed "treason" and "subversive activities" and raised concerns on its potential threats against Hong Kong people's civil liberties. A group of barristers formed the Basic Law Article 23 Concern Group and rallied against the national security legislation. Over 500,000 people to protested on 1 July 2003, the sixth anniversary of the establishment of the HKSAR, against the legislation, the largest demonstration since the handover. The Article 23 legislation further crippled the Tung administration as the government saw its popularity dropped to a new low. The Democratic Alliance for the Betterment of Hong Kong (DAB), the largest pro-Beijing party saw its largest defeat in the District Council elections in November 2003, which alarmed the Beijing and the Hong Kong government.

The Annex I and Annex II of the Basic Law state that the method for selecting the Chief Executive and for forming the Legislative Council could be amended after 2007. The pro-democracy camp argued that the third term of Chief Executive and fourth term of Legislative Council should be elected on the basis of universal suffrage in 2007 and 2008 as stipulated in the Article 45 and 68 of the Basic Law respectively. In 2004, the Article 23 Concern Group transformed into the Article 45 Concern Group calling for the early implementation of the universal suffrage. Facing the pro-democracy pressure for full democratisation, in April 2004, the National People's Congress Standing Committee (NPCSC) ruled out the 2007/08 universal suffrage.

== Retiring incumbents ==
With the cancellation of the Election Committee constituency, there were total of twelve incumbents chose not to run for re-election. Ip Kwok-him lost his seat in the Central and Western District Council therefore was not qualified for running in the District Council functional constituency.

Constituency	Departing incumbents	Party
Kowloon East	Szeto Wah	Democratic
New Territories West	Tang Siu-tong	HKPA
Accountancy	Eric Li Ka-cheung	Independent
Labour	Leung Fu-wah	FTU
Social Welfare	Law Chi-kwong	Democratic
Import and Export	Hui Cheung-ching	HKPA
District Council (First)	Ip Kwok-him	DAB
Election Committee	David Chu Yu-lin	HKPA
Election Committee	Ng Leung-sing	Nonpartisan
Election Committee	Yeung Yiu-chung	DAB
Election Committee	Ambrose Lau Hon-chuen	HKPA
Election Committee	Ma Fung-kwok	New Forum

== Opinion polling ==
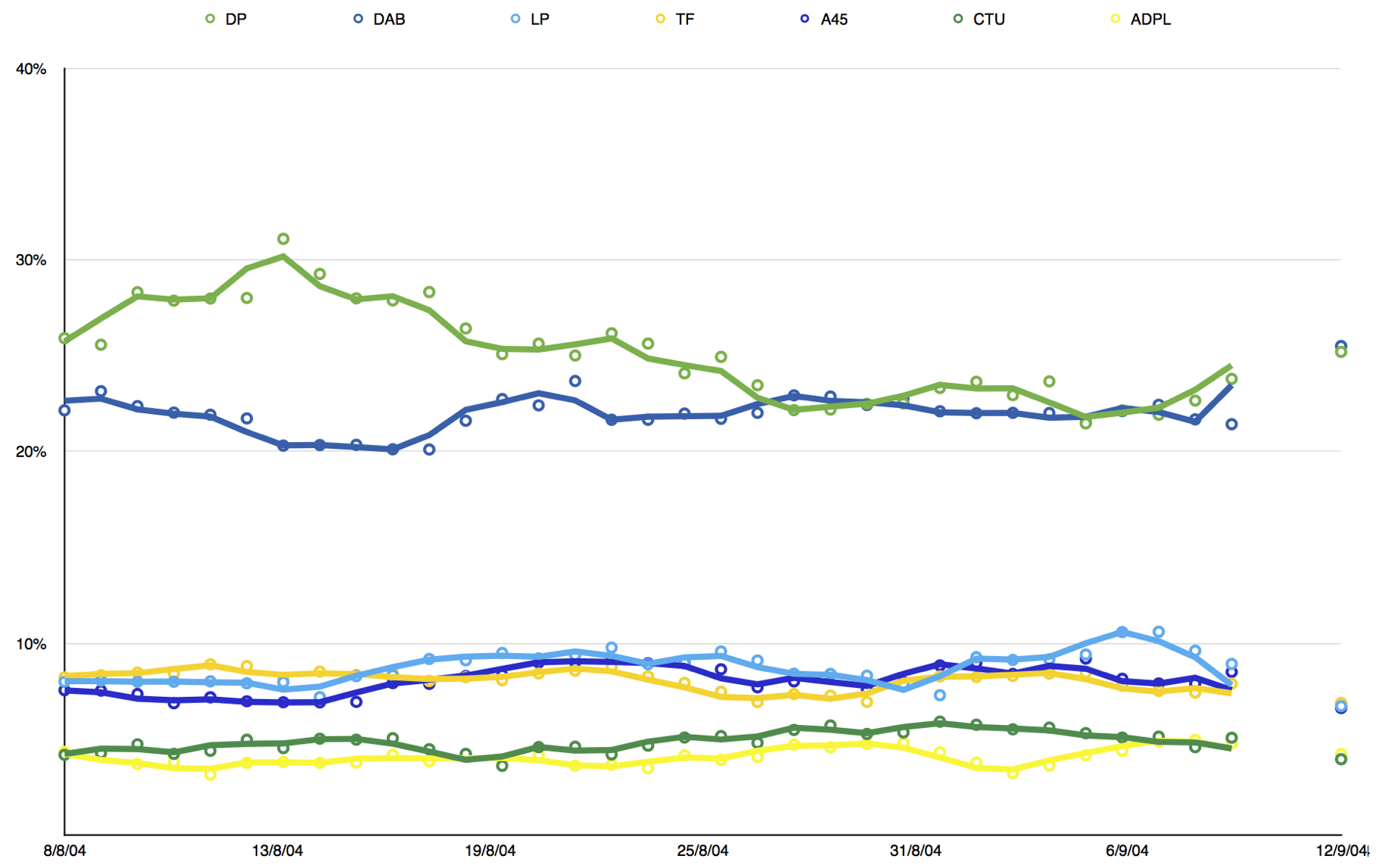

== Results ==
Result by parties and camps

Before election:

↓
22	38
Pro-democracy	Pro-Beijing

Change in composition:

↓
25	35
Pro-democracy	Pro-Beijing

Summary of the 12 September 2004 Legislative Council of Hong Kong election results
Parties and allegiances	Geographical constituencies				Functional constituencies				Total seats	±
Parties and allegiances	Votes	%	±pp	Seats	Votes	%	±pp	Seats	Total seats	±
Democratic Alliance for the Betterment of Hong Kong	402,420	22.73	▼5.67	8	–	–	–	2	10	0
Liberal Party	118,997	6.72	▲4.84	2	6,126	4.71	▼0.25	8	10	▲2
Hong Kong Federation of Trade Unions	52,564	2.97	N/A	1	566	0.44	N/A	2	3	▲2
Hong Kong Progressive Alliance	14,174	0.80	▼1.15	0	17	0.01	▼0.14	0	0	▼4
New Century Forum	4,511	0.25	▼1.35	0	–	–	–	–	0	▼1
Pro-government individuals and others	69,306	3.92	–	1	36,313	27.91	–	11	12	−
Total for pro-Beijing camp	661,972	37.40	▲2.46	12	43,022	33.07	▼6.78	23	35	▼4
Democratic Party	445,988	25.19	▼6.47	7	48,323	37.15	▼8.48	2	9	▼2
Article 45 Concern Group	117,216	6.62	N/A	3	2,597	2.00	N/A	1	4	▲2
The Frontier	121,900	6.89	▲0.11	1	–	–	–	–	1	▼1
Hong Kong Association for Democracy and People's Livelihood	74,671	4.22	▼0.53	1	–	–	–	–	1	0
Hong Kong Confederation of Trade Unions	69,844	3.95	▼3.38	1	–	–	–	–	1	0
April Fifth Action	60,925	3.44	▲2.06	1	–	–	–	–	1	▲1
Neighbourhood and Worker's Service Centre	59,033	3.33	▼1.17	1	–	–	–	–	1	0
Hong Kong Social Workers' General Union	–	–	–	–	3,199	2.46	N/A	0	0	0
Pro democracy individuals and others	155,812	8.80	–	3	27,594	21.21	–	4	7	−
Total for pro-democracy camp	1,105,388	62.44	▲1.88	18	81,713	62.81	▲7.00	7	25	▲4
Non-partisan individuals and others	2,830	0.16	–	0	5,351	4.11	–	0	0	−
Total	1,770,190	100.00		30	130,086	100.00		30	60	0
Valid votes	1,770,190	99.22	▲0.08		130,086	96.41	▼0.25			
Invalid votes	13,941	0.78	▼0.08		4,849	3.59	▲0.25			
Votes cast / turnout	1,784,131	55.63	▲12.06		134,935	70.14	▲13.64			
Registered voters	3,207,227	100.00	▲4.97		192,374	100.00	▲18.00			
Source turnout: Electoral Affairs Commission. 11 candidates in 11 functional constituencies were elected unopposed to the Legislative Council.

Note: For the joint list of pro-democrats in Hong Kong Island, Kowloon East and New Territories East, the votes are divided equally to each candidate.

=== Overview ===
The election was largely seen as a contest between the pro-democracy coalition and the pro-business and pro-Beijing coalitions. There were 162 candidates for 60 seats in the LegCo. Before the election, the pro-democratic camp was widely expected to gain the most votes and increase its representation from 22 seats in the LegCo. Some members of the pro-democratic camp aimed at securing an absolute majority of the seats in the legislature so that they would have the power to veto all government proposals.

The democratic camp called for direct elections for the Chief Executive of Hong Kong in 2007 and for LegCo in 2008, as well as rapid political reform. In contrast, the pro-Beijing and pro-business candidates placed more emphasis on economic growth and social stability. Most of the political parties are now setting 2012 as the ideal time for electoral reform.

While the democratic camp hoped to play up the issue of universal suffrage as a prominent issue in the election, the Standing Committee of the National People's Congress ruled out universal suffrage for the Chief Executive election in 2007 and for LegCo elections in 2008 in April 2004 before the election. Despite this, the pro-democratic camp insisted on promoting their agenda, which seemed to backfire when the campaign lost its original momentum. This was not helped by various sex and financial scandals of a few pro-democracy candidates. There were some allegations by the pro-democracy camp of Mainland Chinese influence behind this.

Some of the developments include:

- Some reports in phone-in radio programmes that some officials in the Mainland requested businessmen to take photographs of their completed ballots with their mobile phones to prove that they have voted for pro-Beijing candidates. In response, the government removed curtains from polling booths to deter such activities.
- The entry into the election race of popular radio show host Albert Cheng, who had accused Beijing of pressuring him to leave his radio program.
- The arrest and sentence (by re-education through labour) of the Democratic Party candidate Alex Ho in Guangdong province of China for (allegedly) being caught and pictured in a hotel bedroom having relations with a prostitute. Although there were some initial predictions that Ho's arrest would help the Democratic Party by highlighting deficiencies in the PRC's judicial system, it is generally agreed that his arrest greatly hurt the party among women voter support in Hong Kong.
- The involvement of Democratic Party James To and The Hong Kong Federation of Trade Unions Chan Yuen-han in scandals relating to the use of public funds for the benefit of their respective political groups.
- Human Rights Watch issued a report a few days before the election, accusing the PRC government of creating a "climate of fear" to influence the election. In response, the Hong Kong government claimed that the report was distorted.
- The assault of a candidate of the Democratic Party in the New Territories East, Wong Sing-chi. The suspect was arrested and reportedly found to be mentally ill.
- The election of radical activist "Long Hair" Leung Kwok-hung, who ran as an independent but who is expected to side with pro-democracy representatives despite his revolutionary leanings.

=== Irregularities ===
There were a few reports of irregularities. Some polling stations ran out of ballot boxes, causing long delays in voting. To fit more ballots into the ballot boxes, some election workers forcefully stuffed ballots into the box using objects such as barbecue forks and metal rulers. Some stations also used random cardboard boxes without official seals. Some ballot boxes were opened before the close of polling.

The polling station operating manual had mistakes in it, so some candidate representatives were kicked out after the closing of the poll and were prevented from witnessing the counting, as required by law.

Some candidates have tried to challenge the election results, but have remained unsuccessful thus far.

A report on the election process was published shortly after the election. Another report was commissioned by the government to suggest future improvements.

=== Votes summary ===
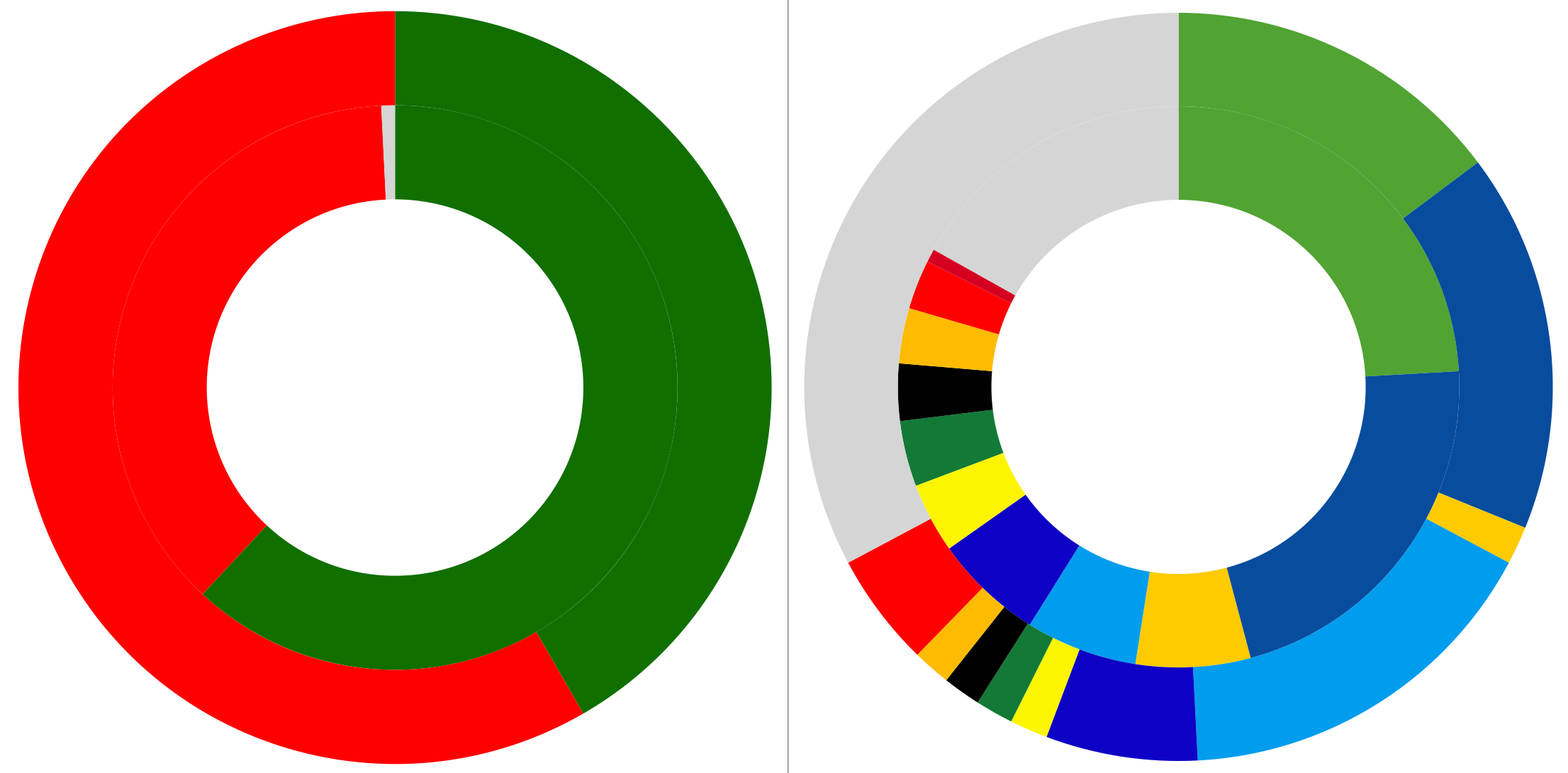
Ring charts of the election results showing popular vote against seats won, coloured in green (Pro-democracy camp) and red (Pro-Beijing camp) on the left and the party colours on the right. Seats won in the election (outer ring) against number of votes (inner ring).

Popular vote
Democratic	25.19%
DAB	22.73%
Frontier	6.89%
Liberal	6.72%
A45	6.62%
ADPL	4.22%
CTU	3.95%
AFA	3.44%
NWSC	3.33%
FTU	2.97%
PA	0.80%
NCF	0.25%
Independent	13.93%

=== Seat summary ===
Seats
DAB	16.67%
Liberal	16.67%
Democratic	15.00%
A45	6.67%
FTU	5.00%
Frontier	1.67%
ADPL	1.67%
CTU	1.67%
AFA	1.67%
NWSC	1.67%
Independent	31.67%

=== Incumbents defeated ===
Eight incumbents lost re-election

Party	Name	Constituency	Remarks
Democratic	Wong Sing-chi	New Territories East	placed fourth on the list
The Frontier/Civic Act-up	Cyd Ho Sau-lan	Hong Kong Island	placed second on the list; running for New Territories East constituency in the last election
Independent	Andrew Wong Wang-fat	New Territories East	
Independent	Lo Wing-lok	Medical	
Independent	Kaizer Lau Ping-cheung	Architectural, Surveying and Planning	
Independent	Michael Mak Kwok-fung	Health Services	
Independent	Chan Kwok-keung	Labour	
Independent	Wu King-cheong	Financial Services	

== Candidate lists and results ==
=== Geographical Constituencies (30 seats) ===
Voting system: Party-list proportional representation with largest remainder method and Hare quota.

Results of the Geographical Constituencies
Hong Kong Island (香港島)

List №	Party/Allegiance	Candidate(s)	Votes	Votes %	Seat(s) won
1	DAB	Ma Lik; Choy So-yuk; Christopher Chung Shu-kun; Yeung Wai-foon; Lee Yuen-kwong; Cheung Kwok-kwan	74,659	21.1	2
2	Independent	Rita Fan Hsu Lai-tai	65,661	18.5	1
3	Independent	Tsang Kin-shing; Chung Chung-fai; Tang Chui-chung	5,313	1.5	
4	Democratic	Yeung Sum; Martin Lee Chu-ming; Joseph Lai Chi-keong	131,788	37.2	2
5	Independent	Kelvin Wong Kam-fai	2,830	0.8	
6	Independent/Civic Act-up	Audrey Eu Yuet-mee (Article 45 Concern Group); Cyd Ho Sau-lan (The Frontier, Civic Act-up)	73,844	20.9	1
TOTAL (Quota: 59,016 votes, 16.67%)			354,095	100.0	6

Kowloon West (九龍西)

List №	Party/Allegiance	Candidate(s)	Votes	Votes %	Seat(s) won
1	Independent	Lau Yuk-shing; Leung Suet-fong; Lau Po-kwan	1,824	0.8	
2	ADPL	Frederick Fung Kin-kee	46,649	20.5	1
3	Independent	Lau Chin-shek	43,460	19.1	1
4	DAB	Jasper Tsang Yok-sing; Chung Kong-mo; Starry Lee Wai-king	61,770	27.1	1
5	Democratic	James To Kun-sun; Chan Ka-wai; Lam Ho-yeung; Ma Kee	60,539	26.6	1
6	ADPL	Liu Sing-lee	13,452	5.9	
TOTAL (Quota: 56,923 votes, 25%)			227,694	100.0	4

Kowloon East (九龍東)

List №	Party/Allegiance	Candidate(s)	Votes	Votes %	Seat(s) won
1	Democratic	Fred Li Wah-ming; Wu Chi-wai; Ho Wai-to	56,462	19.2	1
2	DAB/FTU	Chan Kam-lam; Choi Chun-wa; Chan Tak-ming	55,306	18.8	1
3	Independent	Albert Cheng Jing-han; Andrew To Kwan-hang (The Frontier)	73,479	25.0	1
4	Independent	Alan Leong Kah-kit (Article 45 Concern Group)	56,175	19.1	1
5	FTU/DAB	Chan Yuen-han; Lam Man-fai; Tang Ka-piu (Independent)	52,564	17.9	1
TOTAL (Quota: 58,797 votes, 20.00%)			293,986	100.0	5

New Territories West (新界西)

List №	Party/Allegiance	Candidate(s)	Votes	Votes %	Seat(s) won
1	Independent	Albert Chan Wai-yip	36,278	7.83	1
2	Democratic	Lee Wing-tat; Chan Yuen-sum	62,500	13.49	1
3	Democratic	Albert Ho Chun-yan; Cheung Yin-tung	62,342	13.45	1
4	NWSC	Leung Yiu-chung; Andrew Wan Siu-kin	59,033	12.74	1
5	Independent	Chow Ping-tim	1,725	0.37	
6	Independent	Stephen Char Shik-ngor	9,116	1.97	
7	DAB	Tam Yiu-chung; Cheung Hok-ming; Leung Che-cheung; Au Yeung Po-chun; Tsui Fan; Chan Han-pan; Andy Lo Kwong-sing; Philip Ng King-wah	115,251	24.87	2
8	Independent	Ng Tak-leung	1,920	0.41	
9	Liberal	Selina Chow Liang Shuk-yee; Kenneth Ting Woo-shou	50,437	10.88	1
10	New Century Forum	Lui Hau-tuen; Siu Shing-choi; Chan Choi-hi	4,511	0.97	
11	CTU	Lee Cheuk-yan; Ip Ngok-fung	45,725	9.87	1
12	ADPL	Yim Tim-sang; Kong Fung-yi; Tai Yin-chiu; Kwun Tung-wing	14,570	3.14	
TOTAL (Quota: 57,926 votes, 12.50%)			463,408	100.0	8

New Territories East (新界東)

List №	Party/Allegiance	Candidate(s)	Votes	Votes %	Seat(s) won
1	April Fifth Action	Leung Kwok-hung	60,925	14.14	1
2	Progressive Alliance	Tso Wung-wai	14,174	3.29	
3	7.1 United Front	Andrew Cheng Kar-foo (Democratic); Emily Lau Wai-hing (The Frontier); Tong Ka-wah (Article 45 Concern Group); Wong Sing-chi (Democratic); Richard Tsoi Yiu-cheong (HKCTU); Shirley Ho Suk-ping (Democratic); Ricky Or Yiu-lam (The Frontier)	168,833	39.17	3
4	Liberal	James Tien Pei-chun	68,560	15.91	1
5	Independent	Andrew Wong Wang-fat	23,081	5.36	
6	DAB	Lau Kong-wah; Li Kwok-ying; Mok Kam-kwai; Chan Kwok-kai; So Sai-chi; Wong Pik-kiu; Chan Hak-kan	95,434	22.14	2
TOTAL (Quota: 61,572 votes, 14.29%)			431,007	100.0	7

=== Functional Constituencies (30 seats) ===
Voting systems: Different voting systems apply to different functional constituencies, namely for the Heung Yee Kuk, Agriculture and Fisheries, Insurance and Transport, the preferential elimination system of voting; and for the remaining 24 FCs used the first-past-the-post voting system.

Results of the Functional Constituencies
Constituency	Incumbent	Result	Candidate(s)
Heung Yee Kuk	Lau Wong-fat (Liberal)	Incumbent ran for DC FC; Nonpartisan gain	Lam Wai-keung uncontested
Agriculture and Fisheries	Wong Yung-kan (DAB)	Incumbent hold	Wong Yung-kan (DAB) uncontested
Insurance	Bernard Charnwut Chan	Incumbent hold	Bernard Charnwut Chan uncontested
Transport	Miriam Lau Kin-yee (Liberal)	Incumbent re-elected	Miriam Lau Kin-yee (Liberal) uncontested
Education	Cheung Man-kwong (PTU/Democratic)	Incumbent re-elected	Cheung Man-kwong (PTU/Democratic) 82.94% Yu Kai-chun 17.06%
Legal	Margaret Ng Ngoi-yee (Independent)	Incumbent hold	Margaret Ng Ngoi-yee (Independent) 74.73% Kwong Ka-yin (Independent) 17.21% Judy Tong Kei-yuk (Independent) 8.06%
Accountancy	Eric Li Ka-cheung (Independent)	Incumbent retired Independent gain	Tam Heung-man (Independent) 29.05% Chan Mo-po (Independent) 28.74% Elve Kung Yiu-fai (Independent) 15.54% Edward Chow Kwong-fai 9.13% Louis Leung Wing-on (Independent) 5.17% Peter Chan Po-fun 5.16% Choi Sau-yuk (Independent) 3.80% Wilfred Wu Shek-chun 2.09% Wilfred Wong Wang-tai 1.32%
Medical	Lo Wing-lok (Independent)	Incumbent lost re-election Independent gain	Kwok Ka-ki (Independent) 50.88% Lo Wing-lok (Independent) 42.45% Johnny Ma Kam-chuen 6.67%
Health Services	Michael Mak Kwok-fung (Independent)	Incumbent lost re-election Independent gain	Joseph Lee Kok-long (Independent) 43.01% Michael Mak Kwok-fung (Independent democrat) 30.14% Scarlett Pong Oi-lan 14.27% Siu Kwai-fung (Independent) 12.58%
Engineering	Raymond Ho Chung-tai	Incumbent re-elected	Raymond Ho Chung-tai 57.29% Luk Wang-kwong 42.71%
Architectural, Surveying and Planning	Kaizer Lau Ping-cheung	Incumbent lost re-election Independent gain	Patrick Lau Sau-shing (Independent) 28.36% Kenneth Chan Jor-kin (Independent) 16.29% Kaizer Lau Ping-cheung 15.46% Roger Anthony Nissim (Independent) 13.73% Stanley Ng Wing-fai (Democratic) 13.23% Chan Yiu-fai (Independent) 12.93%
Labour (3 seats)	Li Fung-ying (Nonpartisan)	Incumbent re-elected	Li Fung-ying 32.43% Kwong Chi-kin (FTU) 29.00% Wong Kwok-hing (FTU) 28.00% Chan Kwok-keung 10.57%
Labour (3 seats)	Leung Fu-wah (FTU)	Incumbent retired FTU hold	Li Fung-ying 32.43% Kwong Chi-kin (FTU) 29.00% Wong Kwok-hing (FTU) 28.00% Chan Kwok-keung 10.57%
Labour (3 seats)	Chan Kwok-keung (DAB)	Incumbent lost re-election FTU gain	Li Fung-ying 32.43% Kwong Chi-kin (FTU) 29.00% Wong Kwok-hing (FTU) 28.00% Chan Kwok-keung 10.57%
Social Welfare	Law Chi-kwong (Democratic)	Incumbent retired Nonpartisan gain	Cheung Chiu-hung 39.01% Cheung Kwok-che (SWGU) 38.24% Christine Fong Meng-sang 22.75%
Real Estate and Construction	Abraham Shek Lai-him (Independent)	Incumbent hold	Abraham Shek Lai-him (Independent) uncontested
Tourism	Howard Young (Liberal)	Incumbent re-elected	Howard Young 48.20% Paul Tse Wai-chun 40.75% Freddy Yip Hing-ning 11.05%
Commercial (First)	James Tien Pei-chun (Liberal)	Incumbent ran for NTE GC; Liberal hold	Jeffrey Lam Kin-fung (Liberal) uncontested
Commercial (Second)	Philip Wong Yu-hong	Incumbent hold	Philip Wong Yu-hong uncontested
Industrial (First)	Kenneth Ting Woo-shou (Liberal)	Incumbent ran for NTW GC; Liberal hold	Andrew Leung Kwan-yuen (Liberal) uncontested
Industrial (Second)	Lui Ming-wah	Incumbent hold	Lui Ming-wah uncontested
Finance	David Li Kwok-po	Incumbent hold	David Li Kwok-po uncontested
Financial Services	Wu King-cheong	Incumbent lost re-election Nonpartisan gain	Chim Pui-chung 51.69% Christopher Cheung Wah-fung 17.29% Wu King-cheong 16.35% Fung Ka-pun (Liberal) 11.47% Fung Chi-kin (Progressive Alliance) 3.20%
Sports, Performing Arts, Culture and Publication	Timothy Fok Tsun-ting	Incumbent hold	Timothy Fok Tsun-ting 69.08% Lam Hon-kin (Democratic) 30.92%
Import and Export	Hui Cheung-ching (Progressive Alliance)	Incumbent retired DAB gain	Wong Ting-kwong (DAB) uncontested
Textiles and Garment	Sophie Lau Yau-fun (Liberal)	Incumbent re-elected	Sophie Lau Yau-fun (Liberal) 77.94% Kwan Kam-yuen 22.06%
Wholesale and Retail	Selina Chow Liang Shuk-yee (Liberal)	Incumbent ran for NTW GC; Liberal hold	Vincent Fang Kang (Liberal) 46.85% Fung Leung-lo 36.66% Samuel Chan Tim-shing 16.49%
Information Technology	Sin Chung-kai (Democratic)	Incumbent re-elected	Sin Chung-kai (Democratic) 52.59% Tam Wai-ho 42.65% Leung Mun-yee (Independent) 4.76%
Catering	Tommy Cheung Yu-yan (Liberal)	Incumbent re-elected	Tommy Cheung Yu-yan (Liberal) 63.75% Josephine Chan Shu-ying 21.75% Wong Sin-ying 14.50%
District Council	Ip Kwok-him (DAB)	Incumbent retired Liberal gain	Lau Wong-fat (Liberal) 61.24% Cosmas Kwong Kwok-chuen (Democratic) 28.90% Au Chi-yuen 9.86%
