= Steven Ho =

Steven Ho may refer to:

- Steven Ho (martial artist) (born 1973), Chinese American martial artist, entrepreneur, stunt coordinator and stuntman
- Steven Ho (politician) (born 1979), member of the Legislative Council of Hong Kong
