= Import and Export (constituency) =

Functional constituency of Hong Kong

Import and Export 進出口界
- Functional constituency for the Legislative Council of Hong Kong
- Country: Hong Kong
- Electorate: 311

Current constituency
- Created: 1995
- Number of members: One
- Member: Chung Ki-fung (Independent)

The Import and Export functional constituency (Chinese: 進出口界功能界別) is a functional constituency in the elections for the Legislative Council of Hong Kong first created in 1995 as one of the nine new functional constituencies under the electoral reform carried out by the then Governor Chris Patten, in which the electorate consisted of total 113,241 eligible voters worked related to the import and export industry. It was abolished with the colonial Legislative Council dissolved after the transfer of the sovereignty in 1997.

The constituency was recreated for the 1998 Legislative Council election unless its electorate base has significantly narrowed from individual voting to some 1,000 electors are only limited to import and export companies who are members of the Hong Kong Chinese Importers' and Exporters' Association or are licensed to import and export dutiable commodities, motor vehicles and chemicals. In 2020, there were a total number of 1,603 electors, 984 corporates and 619 individuals in the constituency. After the major electoral overhaul in 2021, the eligible voters are limited to 231 corporate members of the Hong Kong Chinese Importers’ and Exporters’ Association entitled to vote at general meetings of the Association.

== Return members ==
Election	Member	Party
1995	Henry Tang	Liberal
Not represented in the PLC (1997–1998)
1998	Hui Cheung-ching	Progressive Alliance
2000	Hui Cheung-ching	Progressive Alliance
2004	Wong Ting-kwong	DAB
2008	Wong Ting-kwong	DAB
2012	Wong Ting-kwong	DAB
2016	Wong Ting-kwong	DAB
2021	Kennedy Wong	DAB
2025	Chung Ki-fung	Independent

== Electoral results ==
=== 2020s ===
2025 Legislative Council election: Import and Export
Party	Candidate	Votes	%	±%
Independent	Chung Ki-fung	137	55.92	
Independent	Sophia Lee Shuk-woon	108	44.08	
Majority		29	11.84	
Total valid votes		245	100.00	
Rejected ballots		5		
Turnout		250	80.39	+0.19
Registered electors		311		
Independent gain from DAB		Swing		

2021 Legislative Council election: Import and Export
Party	Candidate	Votes	%	±%
DAB	Kennedy Wong Ying-ho	108	69.23	
Independent	Michael Li Chi-fung	48	30.77	
Majority		60	38.46	
Total valid votes		156	100.00	
Rejected ballots		2		
Turnout		158	80.20	
Registered electors		231		
DAB hold		Swing		

=== 2010s ===
2016 Legislative Council election: Import and Export
Party	Candidate	Votes	%	±%
DAB	Wong Ting-kwong	Unopposed		
Registered electors		1,400		
DAB hold		Swing		

2012 Legislative Council election: Import and Export
Party	Candidate	Votes	%	±%
DAB	Wong Ting-kwong	Unopposed		
Registered electors		1,472		
DAB hold		Swing		

=== 2000s ===
2008 Legislative Council election: Import and Export
Party	Candidate	Votes	%	±%
DAB	Wong Ting-kwong	Unopposed		
Registered electors		1,507		
DAB hold		Swing		

2004 Legislative Council election: Import and Export
Party	Candidate	Votes	%	±%
DAB	Wong Ting-kwong	Unopposed		
Registered electors		1,385		
DAB gain from HKPA		Swing		

2000 Legislative Council election: Import and Export
Party	Candidate	Votes	%	±%
HKPA	Hui Cheung-ching	Unopposed		
Registered electors		1,445		
HKPA hold		Swing		

=== 1990s ===
1998 Legislative Council election: Import and Export
Party	Candidate	Votes	%	±%
HKPA	Hui Cheung-ching	Unopposed		
Registered electors		1,182		
HKPA gain from Liberal		Swing		

1995 Legislative Council election: Import and Export
Party	Candidate	Votes	%	±%
Liberal	Henry Tang Ying-yen	24,997	61.67	
Independent	Kwan Lim-ho	15,539	38.33	
Majority		9,458	23.34	
Total valid votes		40,536	100.00	
Rejected ballots		2,710		
Turnout		43,246	38.19	
Registered electors		113,241		
Liberal win (new seat)				
