= Pentecostal Lam Hon Kwong School =

Secondary school in Hong Kong

Coordinates: 22.384321°N 114.202291°E

Pentecostal Lam Hon Kwong School (PLHKS)
- 五旬節林漢光中學
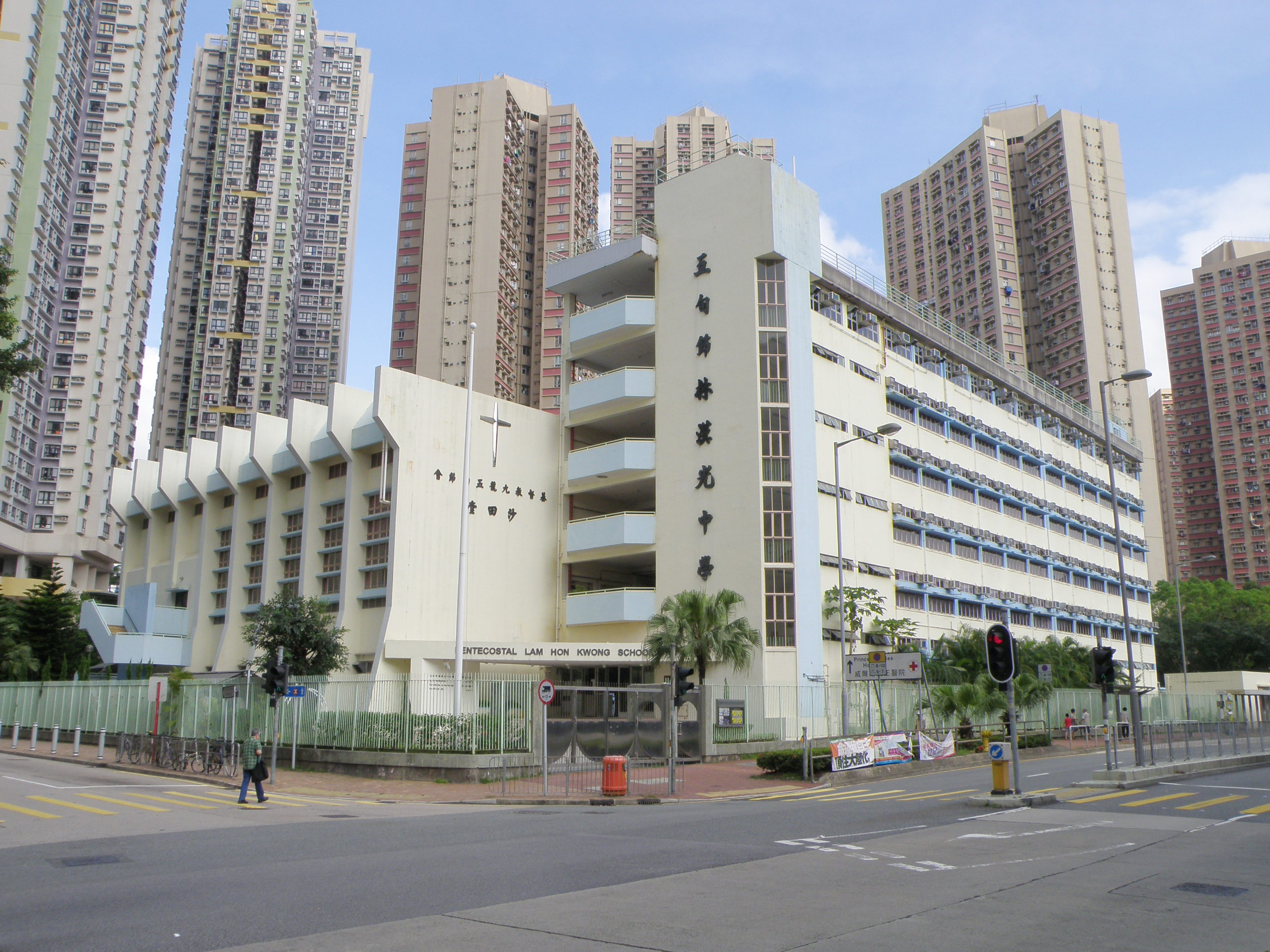
- Pentecostal Lam Hon Kwong School

Location
- Hong Kong

Information
- Type: Middle school
- Motto: Faith, Hope, Love
- Religious affiliation: Pentecostal
- Established: 1983
- Founder: Kowloon Pentecostal Church
- School district: Sha Tin
- Website: www.plhks.edu.hk

Pentecostal Lam Hon Kwong School (PLHKS) (Chinese: 五旬節林漢光中學) is a Pentecostal Christian school located in Sha Tin, New Territories, Hong Kong. It was founded in 1983 by the Kowloon Pentecostal Church with funds for the building donated by Mrs. Lam Yip Wai Man, widow of church member Mr. Lam Hon Kwong, for whom the school is named. It is a secondary school which adopts English as its medium of instruction (EMI). The school is best known for its drama education. Located next to Yue Tin Court, PLHKS is established by the Kowloon Pentecostal Church. It nearest MTR station is City One.

== Class structure (Pre-2023) ==
PLHKS provides courses in six levels, as seen in many other secondary schools in Hong Kong. They start from the lowest level, Secondary 1 (S.1) to Secondary 6 (S.6).

There are 4 classes in junior secondary, S.1, S.2 & S.3, while class A in all 3 levels Ii considered to be 'elite' class.

== School Song ==
Oh, let yonder hills of Shatin resound,

With joy, the song to Thee our hearts are bound,

Lively and young, the Truth we found.

Friends loving, caring and sharing.

Pentecost, we learn the Way.

Pentecost, we live each day.

One Faith, one Hope, one Love;

O Lord, bless our school today.

== School Facilities ==
PLHKS provides wireless internet connection (WiFi) for academic staff. Current students can gain access to the internet by using one of the on-site workstations in the premises. A lift can be accessed by physically-challenged students, staff and visitors. It is located at the end of each corridor next to the rear staircase.

Each student and staff are given an identification card (student card/ staff card) which has a contactless technology. The card is used as morning (and sometimes afternoon) attendance taking and is used to activate the library copier. The issue desk in the library scanned the traditional barcode on the card for book clearance. The card is free of charge at its first issuance. Subsequent issuance of the card is charged at least HKD$35 with a progressive penalty applied which varies every school year.

== General school rules ==
New students are to receive basic information including the school rules in their first week in PLHKS. The discipline department mistress speaks to all new secondary one students in an induction programme about the rules they have to obey throughout their life as a student in the school.

== Award and punishment ==
Students can be awarded or punished by the school for their behavior within the school and outside the school.

=== Award ===
Students are to be awarded usually because they served themselves as class monitor, subject leader or other means of servicing. Students are also awarded for prizes gained in inter-school competitions.

==== Award system ====
The award systems are classified into several categories.

The minimum honour [Praise > Mini Merit > Minor Merit > Major Merit] The maximum honour

==== Hidden awards ====
A merit will be given to students who discovered possessions of which does not belong to them and hand them out. The level of award given depends on the value of the item found.

=== Punishment ===
On the other hand, punishments are to be given to students who break the school rules deliberately. Usually students are given demerits for their frequent lateness and frequent failure to produce work on time.

==== Punishment system ====
The punishment systems are classified into several categories. The items below has been ranked in severity.

The minimum punishment [Warning < Mini Demerit < Minor Demerit < Major Demerit] The maximum punishment

Detention system

Students who fail to hand in homework are sent to detention. They are expected to complete the work which they missed during their detention.

== School administration ==
There are several departments managing the school. Department members are current teaching staff who also perform teaching duties.

=== Department of Studies ===
Chaired by the deputy headmaster, the department endorses teaching plans across all curriculum proposed by various panels.

=== Department of Discipline ===
Chaired by the discipline teacher with a few teachers on hold. Their objective is to teach students about their in-school behavior.

== Notable alumni ==
· Mr Lam Chi Chung - Hong Kong film actor and director · Miss Priscilla Wong - Hong Kong news anchor and actress · Miss Fiona Fung - Cantopop singer-lyricist based in Hong Kong · Miss Kennie Chan - TVB News anchor · The Hon. Capt. Jeremy Tam - Cathay Pacific Airways pilot and member of the Hong Kong Legislative Council (2016 - ) · Miss Daisy Law - Actress at the ViuTV, Champion of the TVB Magazine Cover Girl in 2011 and champion of the ViuTV The Queen of D.n.A in 2016 · Miss Hailey Chan - Actress at the ViuTV · Mr Hui Lok Fai Felix - Football anchor at the Cable TV Hong Kong
