= Agriculture and Fisheries (constituency) =

Functional constituency in the elections for the Legislative Council of Hong Kong

Agriculture and Fisherries 漁農界
- Functional constituency for the Legislative Council of Hong Kong
- Region: Hong Kong
- Electorate: 172

Current constituency
- Created: 1998
- Number of members: One
- Member: Chan Pok-chi (DAB)
- Created from: Primary Production, Power and Construction

The Agriculture and Fisheries functional constituency (Chinese: 漁農界功能界別) is a functional constituency in the elections for the Legislative Council of Hong Kong first created in 1998. The constituency is composed of eight agriculture and 75 fisheries organisations.

A similar Primary Production, Power and Construction functional constituency was created for the 1995 election by Governor Chris Patten was composed of much broaden electorate.

== Return members ==
Election	Member	Party
1998	Wong Yung-kan	DAB
2000	Wong Yung-kan	DAB
2004	Wong Yung-kan	DAB
2008	Wong Yung-kan	DAB
2012	Steven Ho	DAB
2016	Steven Ho	DAB
2021	Steven Ho	DAB
2025	Chan Pok-chi	DAB

== Electoral results ==
Instant-runoff voting system is used from 1998 to 2021. Since 2021, first-past-the-post voting system is in use.

=== 2020s ===
2025 Legislative Council election: Agriculture and Fisheries
Party	Candidate	Votes	%	±%
DAB	Chan Pok-chi	82	50.93	−17.89
Independent	Yeung Sheung-chun	79	49.07	+17.89
Majority		3	1.86	
Total valid votes		161	100.00	
Rejected ballots		6		
Turnout		167	97.09	
Registered electors		172		
DAB hold		Swing		

2021 Legislative Council election: Agriculture and Fisheries
Party	Candidate	Votes	%	±%
DAB	Steven Ho Chun-yin	117	68.82	−4.46
Independent	Yeung Sheung-chun	53	31.18	
Majority		64	37.64	
Total valid votes		170	100.00	
Rejected ballots		0		
Turnout		170	98.27	
Registered electors		176		
DAB hold		Swing		

=== 2010s ===
2016 Hong Kong legislative election: Agriculture and Fisheries
Party	Candidate	Votes	%	±%
DAB	Steven Ho Chun-yin	98	73.28	−12.09
Independent	Wong Yung-kan	35	26.32	
Majority		63	46.96	
Total valid votes		133	100.00	
Rejected ballots		12		
Turnout		145	95.39	
Registered electors		152		
DAB hold		Swing		

2012 Hong Kong legislative election: Agriculture and Fisheries
Party	Candidate	Votes	%	±%
DAB	Steven Ho Chun-yin	105	85.37	
Independent	Chan Mei-tak	18	14.63	
Majority		87	70.64	
Total valid votes		123	100.00	
Rejected ballots		19		
Turnout		142	91.03	
Registered electors		156		
DAB hold		Swing		

=== 2000s ===
2008 Hong Kong legislative election: Agriculture and Fisheries
Party	Candidate	Votes	%	±%
DAB	Wong Yung-kan	Unopposed		
Registered electors		159		
DAB hold		Swing		

2004 Hong Kong legislative election: Agriculture and Fisheries
Party	Candidate	Votes	%	±%
DAB	Wong Yung-kan	Unopposed		
Registered electors		162		
DAB hold		Swing		

2000 Hong Kong legislative election: Agriculture and Fisheries
Party	Candidate	Votes	%	±%
DAB	Wong Yung-kan	Unopposed		
Registered electors		167		
DAB hold		Swing		

=== 1990s ===
1998 Hong Kong legislative election: Agriculture and Fisheries
Party	Candidate	Votes	%	±%
DAB	Wong Yung-kan	81	65.32	
Independent	Lee Hei-yu	43	34.68	
Majority		38	30.64	
Total valid votes		124	100.00	
Rejected ballots		32		
Turnout		156	94.55	
Registered electors		165		
DAB win (new seat)				
