= Po Nga (constituency) =

Hong Kong constituency

- Elected constituency for the Tai Po District Council
- Boundary of Po Nga in Tai Po District
- District: Tai Po
- Legislative Council constituency: New Territories North East
- Population: 17,451 (2019)
- Electorate: 13,654 (2019)

Current constituency
- Created: 1994
- Number of members: One
- Member: Vacant

Po Nga is one of the 19 constituencies in the Tai Po District.

The constituency returns one district councillor to the Tai Po District Council, with an election every four years.

Po Nga constituency is loosely based on Po Nga Court and part of the Tai Wo Estate in Tai Wo with estimated population of 17,451.

== Councillors represented ==
Election	Member	Party
1994	Wong Yung-kan	DAB
1999	Wong Yung-kan	DAB
2003	Wong Yung-kan	DAB
2007	Wong Yung-kan	DAB
2011	Wong Yung-kan	DAB
2015	Chow Yuen-wai→Vacant	Neo Democrats
2019	Chow Yuen-wai→Vacant	Neo Democrats→Independent

== Election results ==
=== 2010s ===
Tai Po District Council Election, 2019: Po Nga
Party	Candidate	Votes	%	±%
Neo Democrats	Chow Yuen-wai	6,657	66.86	+12.96
DAB	Yip Chun-kit	3,300	33.14	−12.96
Majority		3,357	33.72	
Turnout		10,005	73.30	
Neo Democrats hold		Swing		

Tai Po District Council Election, 2015: Po Nga
Party	Candidate	Votes	%	±%
Neo Democrats	Chow Yuen-wai	2,683	53.9	
DAB	Wong Yung-kan	2,292	46.1	–20.8
Majority		391	7.8	
Turnout		5,020	48.1	
Neo Democrats gain from DAB		Swing		

Tai Po District Council Election, 2011: Po Nga
Party	Candidate	Votes	%	±%
DAB	Wong Yung-kan	2,417	66.9	−14.8
Citizens' Radio	Kenneth Cheung Kam-hung	1,196	33.1	
DAB hold		Swing		

=== 2000s ===
Tai Po District Council Election, 2007: Po Nga
Party	Candidate	Votes	%	±%
DAB	Wong Yung-kan	2,516	81.7	+32.4
Liberal	Wong Yeung-tak	563	18.3	−1.9
DAB hold		Swing		

Tai Po District Council Election, 2003: Po Nga
Party	Candidate	Votes	%	±%
DAB	Wong Yung-kan	2,054	49.3	−7.7
Democratic	Chueng Wai-yip	1,272	30.5	−12.1
Liberal	Lam Wai-yin	842	20.2	
DAB hold		Swing		

=== 1990s ===
Tai Po District Council Election, 1999: Po Nga
Party	Candidate	Votes	%	±%
DAB	Wong Yung-kan	1,886	57.0	−14.7
Democratic	Lee Wai-man	1,408	42.6	
DAB hold		Swing		

Tai Po District Board Election, 1994: Po Nga
Party	Candidate	Votes	%	±%
DAB	Wong Yung-kan	1,833	71.7	
Liberal	Tsui Sze-kit	689	26.9	
DAB win (new seat)				
