= List of members of the Legislative Council of Hong Kong =

These are the lists of members of the Legislative Council of Hong Kong:

== Colonial period ==
- List of Legislative Council of Hong Kong unofficial members 1850–1941
- List of Legislative Council of Hong Kong unofficial members 1946–1985

=== Introduction of indirect elections ===
- List of Legislative Council of Hong Kong members 1985–88
- List of Legislative Council of Hong Kong members 1988–91
- List of Legislative Council of Hong Kong members 1991–95

=== Fully elected legislature ===
- List of Legislative Council of Hong Kong members elected in 1995

== SAR administration ==
=== Provisional Legislative Council ===
- List of Provisional Legislative Council of Hong Kong members

=== Since 1998 ===
- List of Legislative Council of Hong Kong members elected in 1998
- List of Legislative Council of Hong Kong members elected in 2000
- List of Legislative Council of Hong Kong members elected in 2004
- List of Legislative Council of Hong Kong members elected in 2008
- List of Legislative Council of Hong Kong members elected in 2012
- List of Legislative Council of Hong Kong members elected in 2016
- List of Legislative Council of Hong Kong members elected in 2021
- List of Legislative Council of Hong Kong members elected in 2025
