= New Century Forum =

New Century Forum 新世紀論壇
- Convenor: Ma Fung-kwok
- Founded: 23 June 1999
- Headquarters: 22/F, Connaught; Commercial Building, 185 Wan Chai Road, Wan Chai
- Ideology: Conservatism (HK)
- Regional affiliation: Pro-Beijing camp
- Legislative Council: 0 / 90
- District Councils: 0 / 470
- NPC (HK deputies): 1 / 36
- CPPCC (HK members): 1 / 124

Website
- www.ncforum.org.hk

New Century Forum
- Traditional Chinese: 新世紀論壇
- Simplified Chinese: 新世纪论坛
Transcriptions
Standard Mandarin
- Hanyu Pinyin: Xīn shìjì lùntán
Yue: Cantonese
- Yale Romanization: Sān sai géi leuhn tàahn
- Jyutping: San^{1} sai^{3} gei^{2} leon^{6} taan^{4}

New Century Forum is a pro-Beijing, middle-class-oriented political group in Hong Kong, compromising professionals, businessmen and academics, and aims to represent the voice of the middle-class. It is currently led by convenor Ma Fung-kwok.

== Platform ==
The basic platform of the group is to consolidate the power of the middle-class and to protect the long-term interest of Hong Kong. It aims to focus on studying various public policy issues and suggest proposals in a rational and professional manner, on the basis of the "One country-two systems" principle. On political development, it advocates development of a democratic political system in a step by step process. The party is relatively small and its platforms undeveloped.

== History ==
The New Century Forum was formed by Ng Ching-fai, then member of the Legislative Council of Hong Kong and dean of the Hong Kong Baptist University. Ng resigned from the President of the Baptist University in 2001 and quit the New Century Forum. Ma Fung-kwok, the incumbent convenor, was elected into LegCo by the election committee in 2001, replacing the Ng Ching-fai. With the cancellation of the election committee seats in the 2004 elections, the group had no seat in the LegCo until convenor Ma Fung-kwok won a seat in the Sports, Performing Arts, Culture and Publication in 2012 LegCo election. Ma was subsequently elected once again through the revived Election Committee constituency until he stood down in 2025.

The group participated in the direct elections in the 2000 LegCo elections and the 2004 LegCo elections but did not win any seat. Members of the group also contested in the District Council elections but usually ran as independent candidates.

== Election performances ==
=== Legislative Council elections ===
Election	Number of popular votes	% of popular votes	GC seats	FC seats	EC seats	Total seats	+/−	Position
2000	21,103	1.60	0	0	1	1 / 60	1▼	7th▲
2004	4,511▼	0.25▼	0	0		0 / 60	1▼	N/A
2012	–	–	0	1		1 / 70	1▲	10th▲
2016	–	–	0	1		1 / 70	0	10th▲
2021	–	–	0	0	1	1 / 90	0	8th▲
2025	Did not contest		0	0	0	0 / 90	1▼	–

=== District Councils elections ===
Election	Number of popular votes	% of popular votes	Total elected seats	+/−
2003	833	0.08	0 / 400	0
2007	543▼	0.05▼	0 / 405	0

== See also ==
- United Front Work Department
- United Front (China)
