= Tso Wong Man-yin =

Hong Kong chemist

Tso Wong Man-yin 曹王敏賢 BBS

Member of the Provisional Legislative Council
- In office 21 December 1996 – 30 June 1998

Personal details
- Born: 30 October 1944 (age 81) Beijing, China
- Party: PA/DAB
- Spouse: Tso Wung-Wai
- Children: 1 son
- Education: Chinese University of Hong Kong (BSc); University of Miami (MSc); University of Wisconsin-Madison (PhD)
- Occupation: Teacher

Marianne Tso Wong Man-yin BBS FRSC (born 30 October 1944, Beijing) is a Hong Kong chemist.

Graduated from the Chinese University of Hong Kong, she obtained her master's degree at the University of Miami and doctoral degree at the University of Wisconsin-Madison. She continued her post-doctoral study at the Stanford University Medical Center. She is a fellow of the Royal Society of Chemistry and worked as the director of the Radioisotope Unit at the University of Hong Kong.

She was also the member of the Provisional Legislative Council (1996–98), member of the Chinese People's Political Consultative Conference National Committee and the executive committee member of the pro-Beijing political party Democratic Alliance for the Betterment and Progress of Hong Kong.

Her husband, Tso Wung-Wai, is also a well-known chemist and politician.

Legislative Council of Hong Kong
New parliament	Member of Provisional Legislative Council; 1997–1998	Replaced by Legislative Council
