= Hui Cheung-ching =

Hui Cheung-ching 許長青 SBS, JP

Member of the Legislative Council
- In office 1 July 1998 – 30 September 2004
- Succeeded by: Wong Ting-kwong
- Constituency: Import and Export

Personal details
- Born: 4 September 1942 Puning, Guangdong, China
- Died: 6 January 2005 (aged 62) Hong Kong
- Party: Hong Kong Progressive Alliance
- Spouse: Hui Chan Shau-yung
- Children: 4
- Education: Foshan University
- Occupation: Company Director

Hui Cheung-ching, SBS, JP (4 September 1942 in Puning, Guangdong, China – 6 January 2005 in Hong Kong) was the member of the Legislative Council of Hong Kong in 1998–2004 for the Import and Export constituency. He was the vice-chairman of the Hong Kong Progressive Alliance, the pro-Beijing business-friendly party. He is the honorary president of the Hong Kong Chinese Importers' and Exporters' Association.
