= Steven Ho (politician) =

Hong Kong politician

The Honourable Steven Ho Chun-yin BBS
- 何俊賢
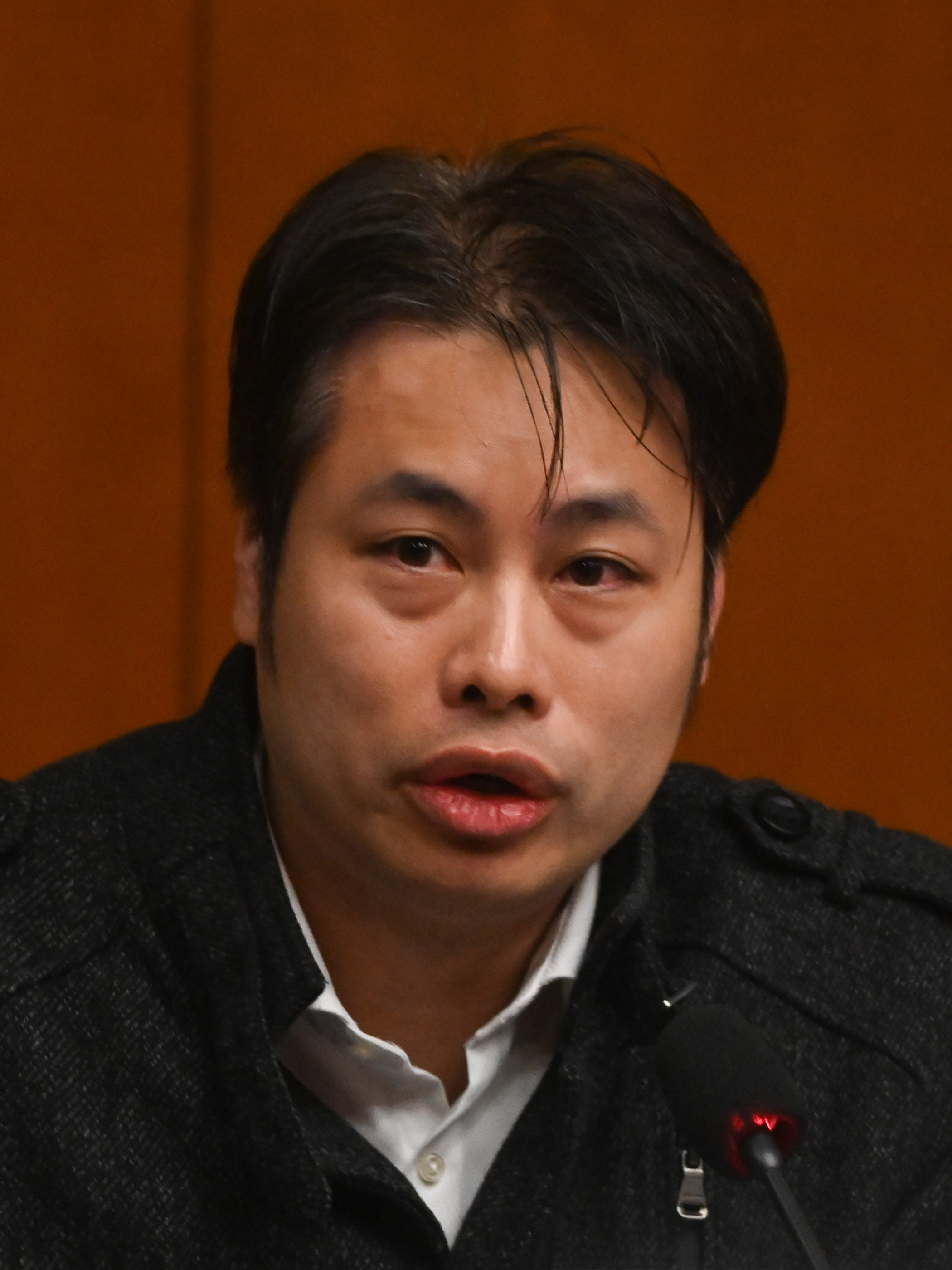
- Ho in 2024

Member of the Legislative Council
- Incumbent
- Assumed office 1 October 2012
- Preceded by: Wong Yung-kan
- Constituency: Agriculture and Fisheries

Personal details
- Born: 30 November 1979 (age 46) Hong Kong
- Party: Democratic Alliance for the Betterment and Progress of Hong Kong
- Education: University of Birmingham (BSc in Communication and Computer System Engineering)
- Occupation: Legislative Councillor

Steven Ho Chun-yin, BBS (traditional Chinese: 何俊賢; simplified Chinese: 何俊贤; born 30 November 1979), is a member of the Legislative Council of Hong Kong representing the election committee constituency since 2026. He represented the functional constituency for Agriculture and Fisheries from 2012 to 2025. He is a member of Democratic Alliance for the Betterment and Progress of Hong Kong party.

== Background ==
Ho graduated from University of Birmingham in Communication and Computer System Engineering. He became a member of the Election Committee for Agriculture and Fisheries constituency. Ho was elected in the Legislative Council of Hong Kong as the successor for Wong Yung-kan in 2012 legislative election and retained the seat in the 2016 election.

In February 2021, Ho criticized RTHK, and accused it of spreading "fake news" and slandering the police.

In March 2021, after learning that the Huanggang Port would cost Hong Kong only HK$1,000 a year, with the rest of the costs handled by Shenzhen, Ho said that Hong Kong should pay more and that "We should pay what we should be paying, instead of just taking advantage of them."

In December 2021, he was re-elected again through Agriculture and Fisheries constituency with 117 votes.

On 30 June 2022, Ho was pictured along with CCP general secretary Xi Jinping and other government officials. His COVID-19 test from that day was negative, but was classified as uncertain on his 1 July 2022 test, and positive on his test on 2 July 2022.

In December 2025, he was re-elected again through Election Committee constituency with 1,267 votes.

Legislative Council of Hong Kong
Preceded by Wong Yung-kan	Member of Legislative Council; Representative for Agriculture and Fisheries; 2012–present	Incumbent
Order of precedence
Preceded by Michael Tien; Member of the Legislative Council	Hong Kong order of precedence Member of the Legislative Council	Succeeded by Frankie Yick; Member of the Legislative Council
