= Hong Kong Chinese Importers' and Exporters' Association =

Hong Kong-based non-profit organization

- Abbreviation: HKCIEA
- Formation: 1954
- Legal status: Not-for-profit organisation
- Purpose: Chambers of commerce of Hong Kong Chinese businessmen
- Location: 287-291 Des Voeux Road Central, 7/F, Champion Building, Central, Hong Kong
- Region served: Hong Kong
- Members: 3,000
- President: Lam Lung-on
- Website: www.hkciea.org.hk

The Hong Kong Chinese Importers' and Exporters' Association (HKCIEA; Chinese: 香港中華出入口商會) is a non-profit organization of local Chinese firms and businessman of the import and export industry based in Hong Kong.

Largely regarded as a pro-Beijing group, it has representative in the Legislative Council of Hong Kong through the Import and Export functional constituency and also electoral representatives in the Election Committee which is responsible for the Chief Executive election. The current holder of the seat in the Legislative Council is Wong Ting-kwong of the pro-Beijing Democratic Alliance for the Betterment and Progress of Hong Kong (DAB).
