= Kennedy Wong =

Hong Kong solicitor

Kennedy Wong BBS, JP
- 黃英豪
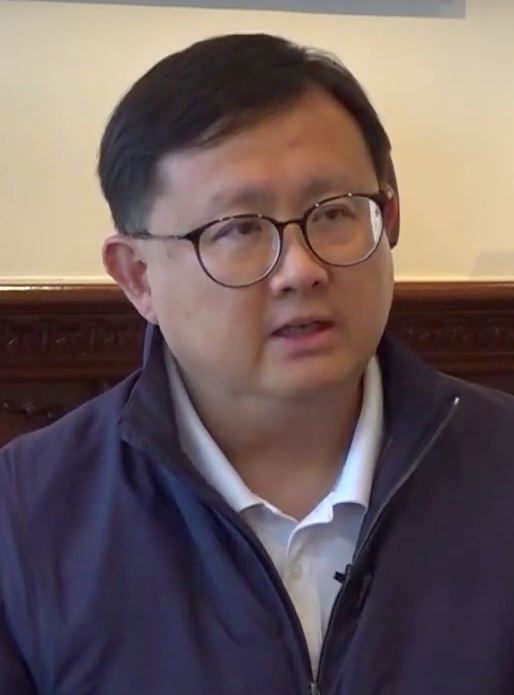
- Wong in 2020

Member of the Legislative Council
- Incumbent
- Assumed office 1 January 2022
- Preceded by: Wong Ting-kwong
- Constituency: Import and Export

Member of the Provisional Legislative Council
- In office 21 December 1996 – 30 June 1998

Personal details
- Born: 23 February 1963 (age 63) Hong Kong
- Party: DAB
- Children: 4
- Education: University of Kent
- Occupation: Solicitor

Kennedy Wong Ying-ho (born 23 February 1963 in Hong Kong) is a Hong Kong solicitor. He is a solicitor of the Supreme Court of Hong Kong. He was also a member of the Provisional Legislative Council which existed from 1996 to 1998 and councillor of the Hong Kong Baptist University. He was the part-time member of the government's Central Policy Unit from 2002 to 2004 and the member of the Chinese People's Political Consultative Conference National Committee.

In December 2021, it was reported that Wong was eligible to vote four times in the 2021 Hong Kong legislative election, yielding 0.0371484% of the total voting value (elected seats), which is 7475 times more than the value of an average voter's total voting value.

According to Wong's January 2022 declaration of assets, he owns shares in about 40 separate companies.

In July 2022, Wong was one of 18 DAB lawmakers who argued that businesspeople should have their own quarantine hotel rooms in Shenzhen, separate from the rest of the population going from Hong Kong to Shenzhen, who use a ballot system to allocate rooms.

In August 2022, Wong announced that he would travel to Indonesia to clarify misconceptions about Hong Kong, and discuss "the true situation in Hong Kong, because unfortunately the international media has not properly reported the whole situation, in particular what really happened in 2019 and what the Hong Kong government as well as different sectors are [doing] to bring us to the next level."

Legislative Council of Hong Kong
New parliament	Member of Provisional Legislative Council; 1997–1998	Replaced by Legislative Council
Preceded by Wong Ting-kwong	Member of Legislative Council; Representative for Import and Export; 2022–present	Incumbent
