= Wong Ting-kwong =

The Honourable Wong Ting-kwong GBS, JP
- 黃定光
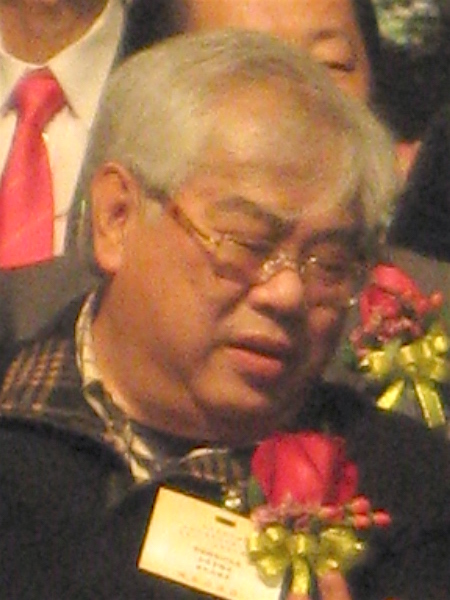

Member of the Legislative Council
- In office 1 October 2004 – 31 December 2021
- Preceded by: Hui Cheung-ching
- Succeeded by: Kennedy Wong
- Constituency: Import and Export

Personal details
- Born: 12 September 1949 (age 77) Hong Kong
- Party: DAB
- Spouse: Lam Shuk-yee
- Education: Heung To Middle School; Guangzhou No.6 High School

Wong Ting-kwong, GBS (Chinese: 黃定光, born 12 September 1949, Hong Kong) is a former member of Legislative Council of Hong Kong (Legco), representing import and export industry in functional constituencies seats.

He is a businessman, honorary president of the Hong Kong Chinese Importers' and Exporters' Association and the member of the Democratic Alliance for the Betterment and Progress of Hong Kong. Wong was born in Hong Kong, and his ancestral hometown is Dongguan City, Guangdong province, China.

In January 2021, after a HK$280 million funding request was passed without any officials present to answer his questions, Wong was informed that he had missed a deadline to request the secretariat to have officials present, despite being a lawmaker for 16 years.

Legislative Council of Hong Kong
Preceded by Hui Cheung-ching	Member of Legislative Council; Representative for Import and Export; 2004–2021	Succeeded by Kennedy Wong
Order of precedence
Preceded by Joseph Lee; Member of the Legislative Council	Hong Kong order of precedence Member of the Legislative Council	Succeeded by Starry Lee; Member of the Legislative Council
