= Hong Kong Progressive Alliance =

Hong Kong Progressive Alliance 香港協進聯盟
- Chairman: Ambrose Lau
- Founded: 7 July 1994; 32 years ago
- Dissolved: 16 February 2005; 21 years ago
- Merger of: Liberal Democratic; Federation of Hong Kong
- Merged into: Democratic Alliance for the Betterment and Progress of Hong Kong
- Headquarters: 11/F., Chung Nam; Building, 1 Lockhart; Road, Hong Kong
- Ideology: Chinese nationalism Conservatism; Economic liberalism
- Political position: Centre-right to right-wing
- Regional affiliation: Pro-Beijing camp
- Colors: Red

Hong Kong Progressive Alliance
- Traditional Chinese: 香港協進聯盟
- Simplified Chinese: 香港协进联盟
Transcriptions
Standard Mandarin
- Hanyu Pinyin: Xiānggǎng Xié Jìn Liánméng
- Wade–Giles: Hsiang^{1}-kang^{3} Hsieh^{2} Chin^{4} Lien^{2}-mêng^{2}
Yue: Cantonese
- Yale Romanization: Hēung góng hip jeun lyùhn màhng
- Jyutping: Hoeng1 gong2 hip3 zeon3 lyun4 mang4

HKPA
- Traditional Chinese: 港進聯
- Simplified Chinese: 港进联
Transcriptions
Standard Mandarin
- Hanyu Pinyin: Gǎng Jìn Lián
- Wade–Giles: Kang^{3} chin^{4} lien^{2}
Yue: Cantonese
- Yale Romanization: Góng jeun lyùhn
- Jyutping: Gong2 zeon3 lyun4

The Hong Kong Progressive Alliance (HKPA) was a pro-Beijing, pro-business political party in the Hong Kong Special Administrative Region of the People's Republic of China. It was established in 1994 and was merged into the Democratic Alliance for the Betterment of Hong Kong (DAB) in 2005. The DAB then renamed as the Democratic Alliance for the Betterment and Progress of Hong Kong.

== Stances ==
The party was composed of mainly businessmen and professionals. The party was considered a pro-business conservative and pro-Beijing one. It assured another voting block in support of Beijing's interest. The basic platform of the party was to defend "One country-two systems" and the Basic Law, the mini-constitution of Hong Kong. It advocated handling political and social issues in a moderate, pragmatic and harmonious manner, and the 'progressive' development of democracy, emphasising 'stability, prosperity and progress'.

Party members maintained close relationships with Mainland China authorities. A number of them were deputies to the National People's Congress and members of the Chinese People's Political Consultative Conference of the People's Republic of China.

== History ==
Old logo used from 1994–97 before merging with the Liberal Democratic Federation of Hong Kong

In July 1994, solicitor Ambrose Lau founded the 52-member Hong Kong Progressive Alliance in the direction of the New China News Agency which consisted of mostly pro-business factor of the CCP's united front, the Hong Kong Chinese Reform Association, the Federation for the Stability of Hong Kong and the New Hong Kong Alliance in preparation for the 1995 Legislative Council Election. Ambrose Lau became the only member won the seat in the election through the Election Committee. It merged with the Liberal Democratic Federation (LDF) in 1997, another pro-business party formed in 1990.

The party won 5 seats in the 1998 election of the Legislative Council, of which 2 were from functional constituencies and 3 were from the election commission. In the 2000 LegCo election, the party won 4 seats (excluding Choy So-yuk who had joined the Democratic Alliance for the Betterment of Hong Kong (DAB) in the election). These included 1 seat each from geographical and function constituencies and 2 from election committee.

With the abolition of the election committee LegCo seats in 2004 election, the HKPA had an internal dispute on whether the party should send members for geographical direct elections. David Chu Yu-lin intended to run for a seat in New Territories East, and began canvassing, but suddenly decided to quit in late July. Tang Siu-tong also declined to run for re-election.

After that the party decided to let Tso Wung-wai to run for the election in New Territories East only, though there was a rumour that an independent candidate in New Territories West, Chow Ping-tim, was actually a member of HKPA. However, some outsiders think that HKPA was insincere in participating in direct elections and the dispute shows the party came to a decline. The party lost all the seats in the Legislative Council in the election.

HKPA merged with the Democratic Alliance for the Betterment of Hong Kong (DAB) on 16 February 2005.

== Members of the party in the Legislative Council ==
- Choy Kan-pui
- Choy So-yuk (also a DAB member)
- David Chu Yu-lin
- Hui Cheung-ching
- Ambrose Lau Hon-chuen
- Tang Siu-tong
- Tso Wong Man-yin
- Wong Siu-yee
- Henry Wu
- Charles Yeung

== Electoral performance ==
=== Legislative Council elections ===
Election	Number of popular votes	% of popular votes	GC seats	FC seats	EC seats	Total seats	+/−	Position
1995	25,964	2.85	0	0	1	1 / 60	1▲	7th
1998	–	–	0	2	3	5 / 60	—N/a	4th▲
2000	25,773▼	1.95▼	1	1	2	4 / 60	1▼	4th
2004	14,174▼	0.80▼	0	0	–	0 / 60	4▼	0▼

=== Municipal elections ===
Election	Number of popular votes	% of popular votes	UrbCo seats	RegCo seats	Total elected seats
1995	5,278	0.95	0 / 32	0 / 27	0 / 59

=== District Council elections ===
Election	Number of popular votes	% of popular votes	Total elected seats	+/−
1994	3,288	0.48	1 / 346	0
1999	23,168▲	2.86▲	16 / 390	1▼
2003	29,091▲	2.77▼	13 / 400	5▼

== See also ==
- Politics of Hong Kong
- List of political parties in Hong Kong
