= Wong Yung-kan =

Wong Yung-kan SBS, JP
- 黃容根

Member of the Legislative Council of Hong Kong
- In office 1 July 1998 – 30 September 2012
- Preceded by: New parliament
- Succeeded by: Steven Ho
- Constituency: Agriculture and Fisheries

Personal details
- Born: 10 August 1951 (age 75) Hong Kong
- Party: Democratic Alliance for the Betterment and Progress of Hong Kong (until 2016)
- Spouse: Chan Sai-kiu
- Education: South China Teacher's University
- Occupation: Fisherman

Wong Yung-kan, SBS, JP (Chinese: 黃容根, 10 August 1951) is a former member of the Legislative Council of Hong Kong, representing Agriculture and Fisheries functional constituency.

Born into a Tanka family, he is a fisherman. He was a member of the pro-Beijing Democratic Alliance for the Betterment and Progress of Hong Kong (DAB), until he quit the party in 2016 and planned to run for the 2016 Legislative Council of Hong Kong. He is also a former member of Tai Po District Council representing Po Nga constituency.

Legislative Council of Hong Kong
New parliament	Member of Legislative Council; Representative for Agriculture and Fisheries; 1998–2012	Succeeded by Steven Ho
