= 1995 President of the Hong Kong Legislative Council election =

Election for the President of the Legislative Council, 1995–97 session
← 1993	11 October 1995	1997 →
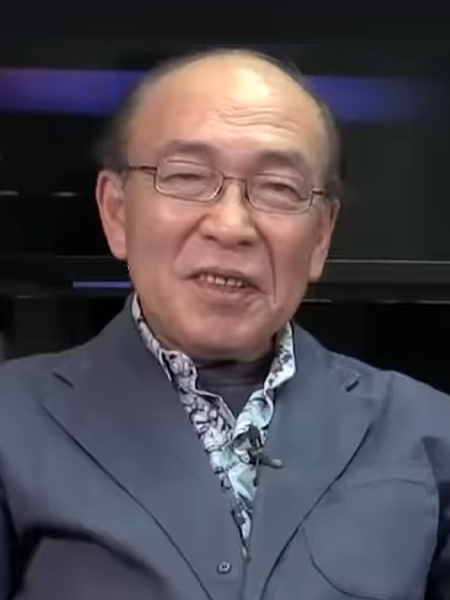
	Minority party
Candidate	Andrew Wong
Party	Independent
Constituency	New Territories South-east
Votes	Unopposed
President before election
John Joseph Swaine
Independent
Elected President
Andrew Wong
Independent

An election for the President of the Legislative Council of Hong Kong took place on 11 October 1995 for members to among themselves elect the new President. Andrew Wong was unopposed and took up the presidency until the handover of Hong Kong in 1997.

== Election ==
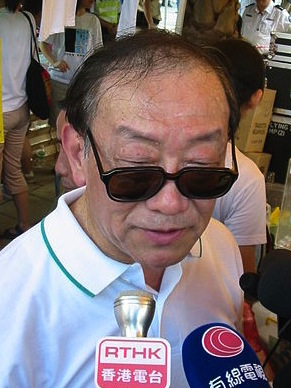
Allen Lee, once Senior Member of the Council, presided over the election

Andrew Wong, independent, received the support of the largest faction in the council, the Democratic Party, and some other independents. The rival Liberal Party and some other independents were said to have lobbied the former Secretary for Health and Welfare, Elizabeth Wong Chien Chi-lien, to compete for the presidency. Wong, however, preferred to run for the chairmanship of the powerful finance committee.

At the end, the Clerk to the council received only one valid nomination for the office of President. Andrew Wong was proposed by Martin Lee, chairman of Democratic Party, and seconded by Eric Li, Lee Cheuk-yan, General Secretary of CTU, and Fung Kin-kee, chairman of ADPL. Wong was then declared to be elected President of the council.

== Reaction ==
After taking the chair, Wong said he is deeply honoured and particularly proud to preside over a Council which is facing challenging times ahead. He also announced he is resigning from government advisory committees as services in the Executive Branch will necessarily conflict with the neutral role as president.

He also said he will represent members' views in his contacts with the administration, not be a go-between for the Government, and pledged not to take sides between political parties.

South China Morning Post said Wong is expected to be wholly impartial and independent of any party, and competition for the presidency could all too easily politicise it and undermine its impartiality.
