= 2000 President of the Hong Kong Legislative Council election =

Election for the President of the Second Legislative Council
← 1998	4 October 2000	2004 →
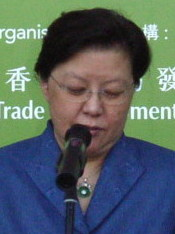

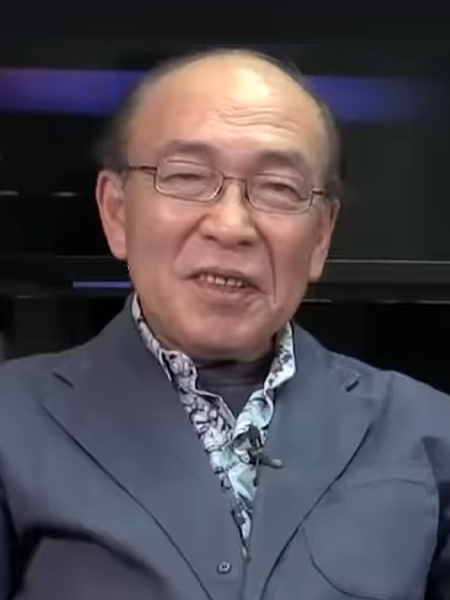
	Majority party	Minority party
Candidate	Rita Fan	Andrew Wong
Party	Independent	Independent
Constituency	Election Committee	New Territories East
Votes	38 (64.41%)	21 (35.59%)
President before election
Rita Fan
Independent
Elected President
Rita Fan
Independent

The election for the President of the Second Legislative Council took place on 4 October 2000 for members of the 2nd Legislative Council of Hong Kong to among themselves elect the President of the Legislative Council of Hong Kong for the duration of the council. Rita Fan from the pro-Beijing camp defeated former President Andrew Wong and was re-elected.

== Proceedings ==
According to Article 71 of the Hong Kong Basic Law and Rule 4 of the Rules of Procedure of the Legislative Council, the President of the Legislative Council has to be a Chinese citizen of 40 years old or above, a permanent resident of Hong Kong with no right of abode in any foreign country, and has ordinarily resided in Hong Kong for not less than 20 years continuously.

According to the Standing Order, the member present who has the longest continuous service in the Council shall preside at the election. Kenneth Ting thus chaired the election.

Rita Fan, the incumbent President of the council, was nominated by James Tien, and seconded by 10 other pro-government members. Andrew Wong, who served as president in the colonial Council, was nominated by Margaret Ng and seconded by 3 democrats.

== Candidates ==
- Rita Fan (Independent, pro-Beijing camp), President of the Legislative Council (since 1997)

Nominations – James Tien (Lib), Jasper Tsang (DAB), Philip Wong, Ambrose Lau (HKPA), Eric Li (Breakfast), Li Fung-ying (FLU), Lui Ming-wah (Breakfast), Bernard Chan (Breakfast), Ng Leung-sing (Breakfast), Raymond Ho (Breakfast), Ng Ching-fai (NCF)

- Andrew Wong (Independent, pro-democracy camp), former President of the Legislative Council (1995–1997)

Nominations – Margaret Ng, James To (Dem), Law Chi-kwong (Dem), Sin Chung-kai (Dem)

== Results ==
Rita Fan was re-elected, becoming the first President of the council with a four-year term of office since the handover.

Candidate	Votes	%
Rita Fan ✓	38	64.41
Andrew Wong	21	35.59
Spoilt/rejected ballots	0	0
Turnout	59 (Note: Cheng Kai-nam resigned after elected due to corruption scandal, therefore vacating a seat in the Legislative Council)	100
