= 2004 President of the Hong Kong Legislative Council election =

Election for the President of the Third Legislative Council
← 2000	6 October 2004	2008 →
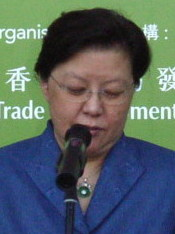

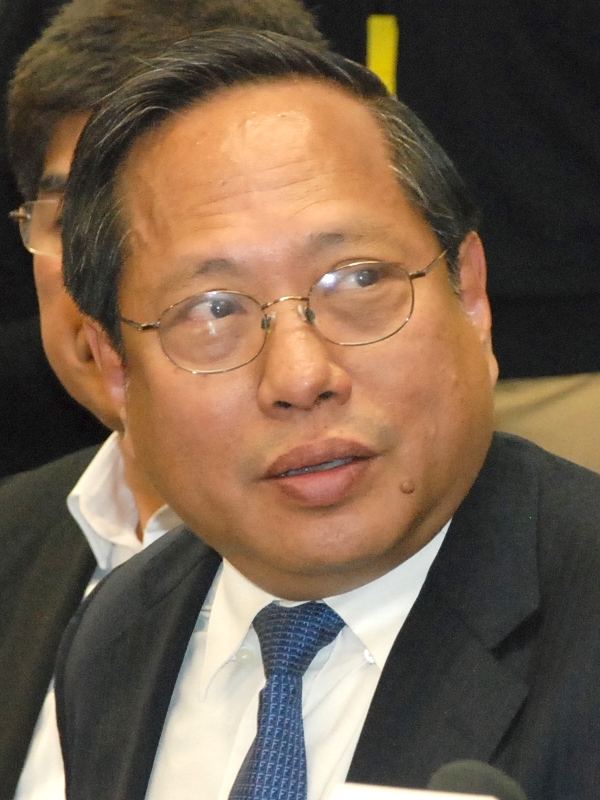
	Majority party	Minority party
Candidate	Rita Fan	Albert Ho
Party	Independent	Democratic
Constituency	Hong Kong Island	New Territories West
Votes	34 (56.67%)	25 (41.67%)
President before election
Rita Fan
Independent
Elected President
Rita Fan
Independent

The election for the President of the Third Legislative Council took place on 6 October 2004 for members of the 3rd Legislative Council of Hong Kong to among themselves elect the President of the Legislative Council of Hong Kong for the duration of the council. Rita Fan from the pro-Beijing camp defeated Albert Ho, a democrat, and was re-elected as widely expected.

== Proceedings ==
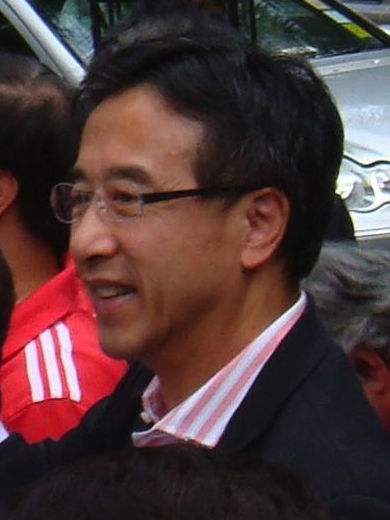
James Tien presided over the election

According to Article 71 of the Hong Kong Basic Law and Rule 4 of the Rules of Procedure of the Legislative Council, the President of the Legislative Council has to be a Chinese citizen of 40 years old or above, a permanent resident of Hong Kong with no right of abode in any foreign country, and has ordinarily resided in Hong Kong for not less than 20 years continuously.

According to the Standing Order, the member present who has the longest continuous service in the Council shall preside at the election. James Tien thus chaired the special forum on 6 October, which allowed candidates to present their manifesto and answer questions from other members, and the election.

Members first took oath of office before the election began. As the court ruled earlier any changes to the oath would breach the Basic Law, Leung Kwok-hung, the new left-wing pro-democracy MP, wore black T-shirt with slogans commemorating the Tiananman Square protests instead of formal attire, and chanted "vindicate Tiananmen Square protests", "end to one-party dictatorship", "Long live democracy, long live people" before and after the oath-taking ceremony. Leung also pronounced the oath with pauses between "Republic" and "People's of China", and "Hong Kong" and "Special Administrative Region".

Jasper Tsang, the former chairman of pro-Beijing DAB, questioned the validity of Leung's oath as he did not sign, which the Secretary-general of the Council confirmed the signature was not required.

== Candidates ==
- Albert Ho (Democratic, pro-democracy camp)

Nominations – Andrew Cheng (Democratic), Audrey Eu (A45), Margaret Ng (A45), Fred Li (Democratic), Albert Cheng, Leung Kwok-hung (April 5th), Lee Cheuk-yan (CTU)

- Rita Fan (Independent, pro-Beijing camp), President of the Legislative Council (since 1997)

Nominations – David Li, Jasper Tsang (DAB), Philip Wong, James Tien (Liberal), Raymond Ho (Breakfast), Abraham Shek (Breakfast)

== Results ==
Rita Fan was re-elected without surprise as the Beijing loyalists secured a majority in the parliament, even the media had predicted the vote tally quite accurately. Pro-Beijing Chim Pui-chung admitted casting the abstain vote, saying he had already told the public so and would not endorse Fan as she would for sure win.

Candidate	Votes	%
Rita Fan ✓	34	56.67
Albert Ho	25	41.67
Spoilt/rejected ballots	1	1.67
Turnout	60	100
