= 1998 President of the Hong Kong Legislative Council election =

Election for the President of the First Legislative Council
← 1997	2 July 1998	2000 →
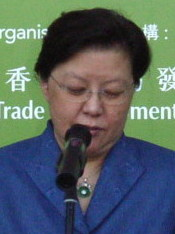

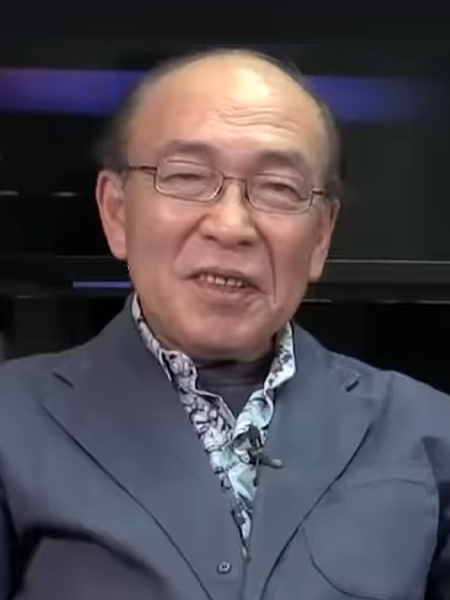
	Majority party	Minority party
Candidate	Rita Fan	Andrew Wong
Party	Independent	Independent
Constituency	Election Committee	New Territories East
Votes	36 (60%)	24 (40%)
President before election
Rita Fan
(as President of Provisional Legislative Council)
Independent
Elected President
Rita Fan
Independent

The election for the President of the First Legislative Council took place on 2 July 1998 for members of the 1st Legislative Council of Hong Kong to among themselves elect the President of the Legislative Council of Hong Kong for the duration of the council. Rita Fan from the pro-Beijing camp, who presided over the provisional legislature, defeated pre-handover President Andrew Wong.

== Proceedings ==
According to Article 71 of the Hong Kong Basic Law and Rule 4 of the Rules of Procedure of the Legislative Council, the President of the Legislative Council has to be a Chinese citizen of 40 years old or above, a permanent resident of Hong Kong with no right of abode in any foreign country, and has ordinarily resided in Hong Kong for not less than 20 years continuously.

Following the taking of oath of office, members of the Council proceeded to elect a member to preside over the election of the President. Pan-democracy Yeung Sum (Dem) orally nominated pro-business Edward Leong (Breakfast), and seconded by Ronald Arculli (Lib) and Christine Loh (Citizens). Without other nominations, Leong then chaired the meetings as he accepted the nomination.

Rita Fan, the incumbent President of the council, was nominated by Philip Wong, and seconded by 4 other pro-government members. Andrew Wong, who served as president in the colonial Council, was nominated by Edward Leong and seconded by 3 pro-democracy MPs.

== Candidates ==
- Rita Fan (Independent, pro-Beijing camp), President of the Provisional Legislative Council (1997–1998)

Nominations – Philip Wong, Lau Wong-fat (Lib), Ng Leung-sing (Breakfast), Chim Pui-chung, David Chu (HKPA)

- Andrew Wong (Independent, pro-democracy camp), former President of the Legislative Council (1995–1997)

Nominations – Edward Leong (Breakfast), Margaret Ng, Leung Yiu-chung (NWSC), James To (Dem)

== Results ==
Rita Fan was elected as the President and continued chairing Hong Kong's legislature. Previously divided in its choice, the Liberal Party gave its 10 votes to Fan.

Margaret Ng said with the Council represented by a legislator from the 800-strong Election Committee, "democratic forces seem to have been overcome by undemocratic ones". Lee Cheuk-yan (Frontier) claimed the new legislature will still be "haunted by the provisional legislature's ghosts".

While Andrew Wong believed the selection of the President was based on party lines rather than suitability, Rita Fan dismissed criticism about her lack of a democratic mandate.

Candidate	Votes	%
Rita Fan ✓	36	60
Andrew Wong	24	40
Spoilt/rejected ballots	0	0
Turnout	60	100
