= 2012 President of the Hong Kong Legislative Council election =

Fifth Legislative Council election

Election for the President of the Fifth Legislative Council
← 2008	10 October 2012	2016 →
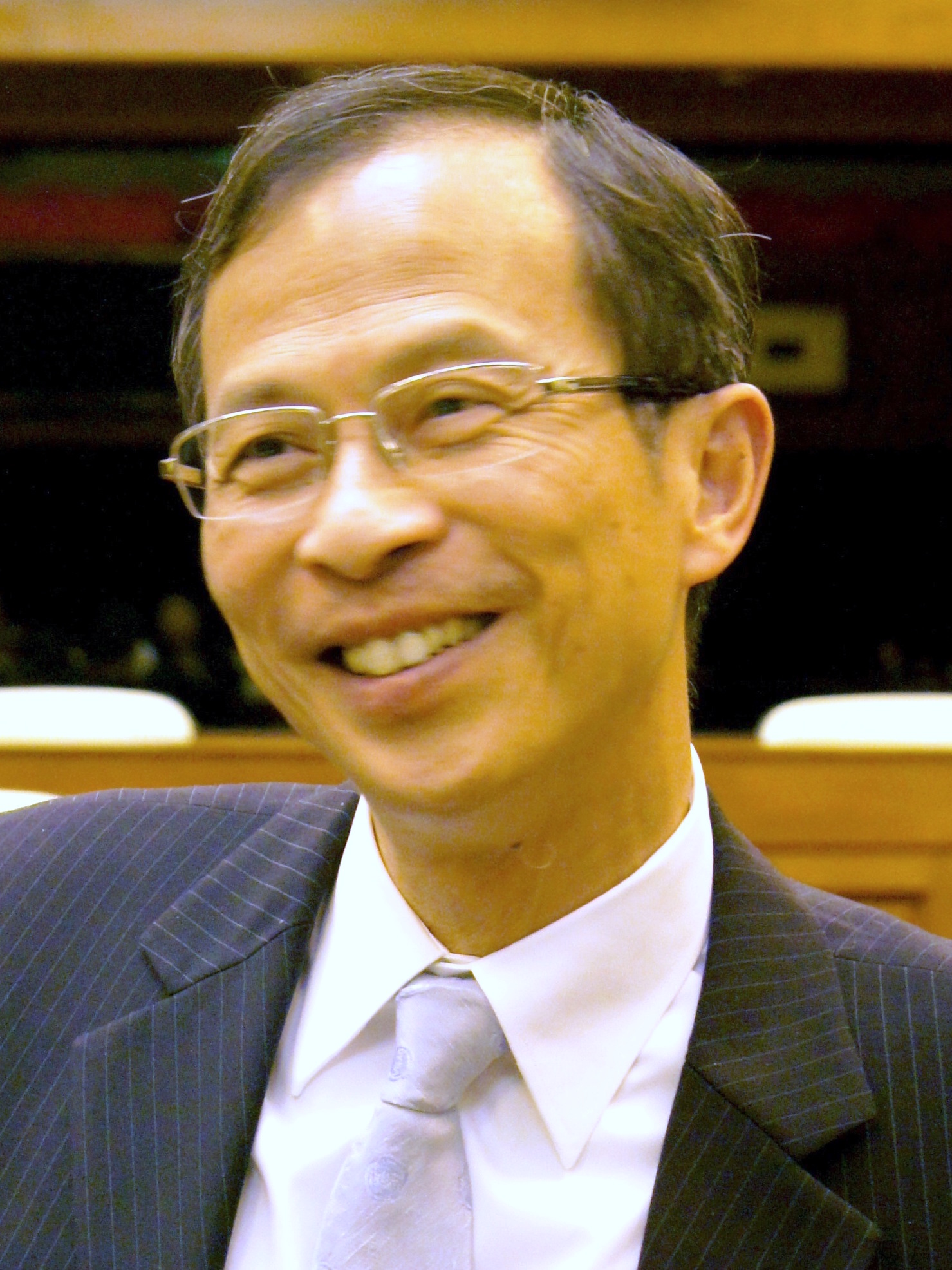

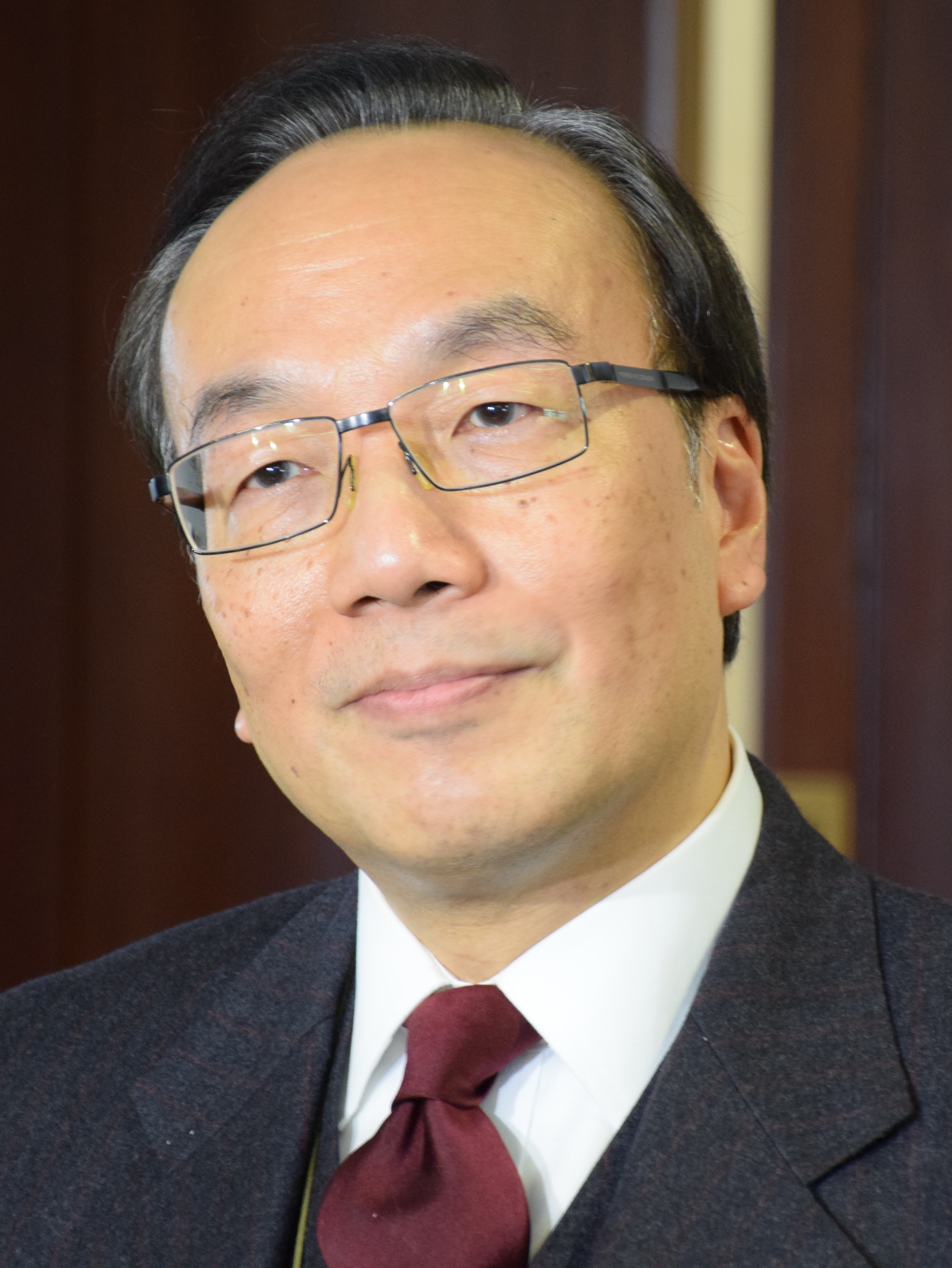
	Majority party	Minority party
Candidate	Jasper Tsang	Alan Leong
Party	DAB	Civic
Constituency	Hong Kong Island	Kowloon East
Votes	43 (61.43%)	27 (38.57%)
President before election
Jasper Tsang
DAB
Elected President
Jasper Tsang
DAB

The election for the President of the Fifth Legislative Council took place on 10 October 2012 for members of the 5th Legislative Council of Hong Kong to elect the President of the Legislative Council of Hong Kong for the duration of the council.

== Proceedings ==
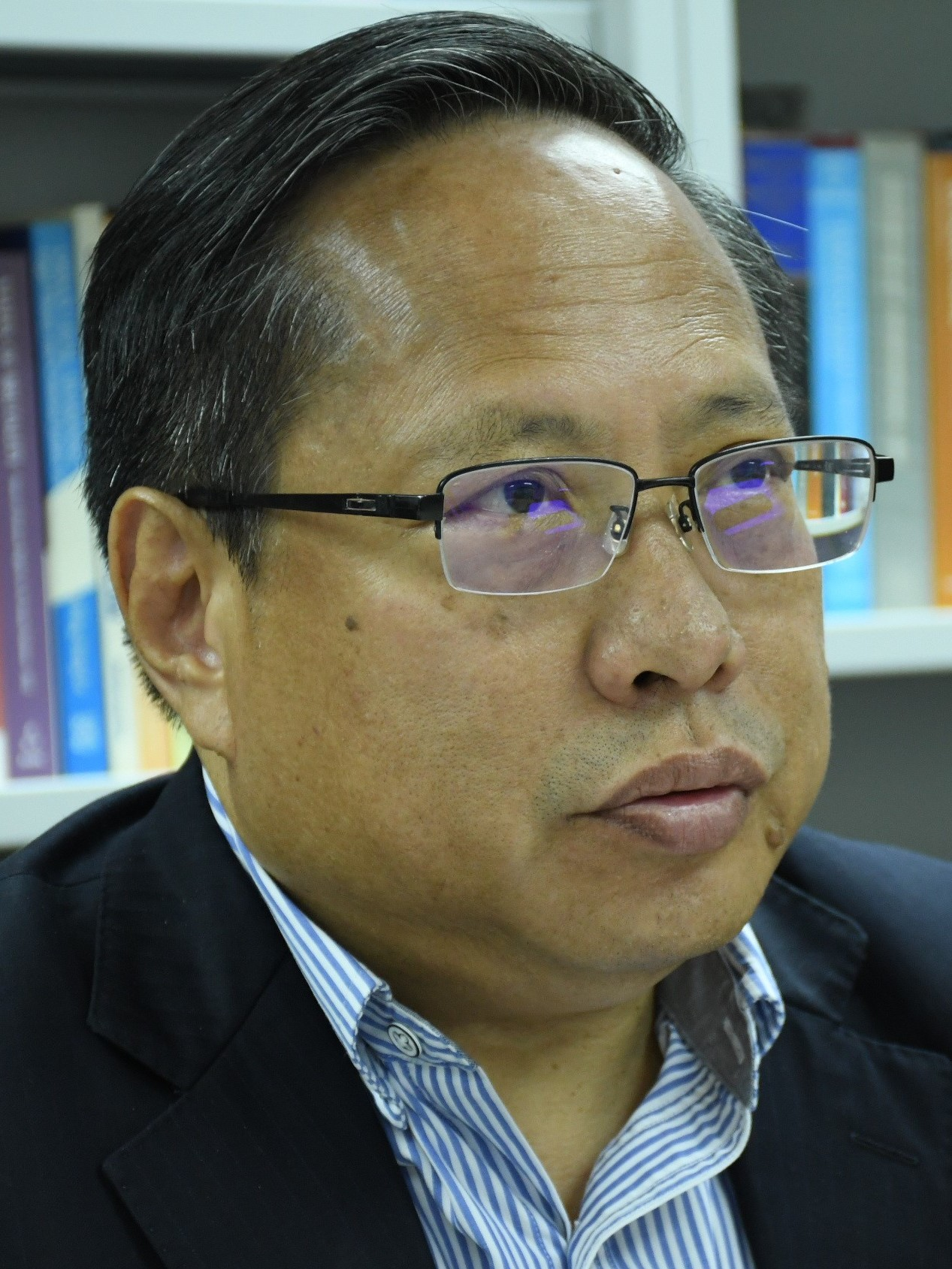
Albert Ho presided over the election

According to Article 71 of the Hong Kong Basic Law and Rule 4 of the Rules of Procedure of the Legislative Council, the President of the Legislative Council has to be a Chinese citizen of 40 years old or above, a permanent resident of Hong Kong with no right of abode in any foreign country and has ordinarily resided in Hong Kong for not less than 20 years continuously.

As the most senior member of the parliament, Albert Ho presided over the special forum on 8 October, which allowed candidates to present their manifesto and answer questions from other members and the election. Before the voting began, three radical democrats, Leung Kwok-hung, Wong Yuk-man, and Chan Wai-yip, questioned if Tsang was a member of the Chinese Communist Party, but Ho insisted no Q&A for the voting session.

While all democrats voted for Leong, Tsang was re-elected with the backing of the pro-Beijing camp.

== Candidates ==
Candidate	Party affiliation	Political camp	Born	Political office
Jasper Tsang; GBM JP	DAB	Pro-Beijing	17 May 1947 (age 65); Guangzhou, China	President of the Legislative Council (since 2008); Chairman of Committee on Rules of Procedure of the Legislative Council (2004–2008); Member of the Legislative Council for Hong Kong Island (since 2008); Member of the Legislative Council for Kowloon West (1998–2008); Member of the Provisional Legislative Council (1996–1998); Non-official Member of the Executive Council (2002–2008); Chairman of the DAB (1992-2003)
Alan Leong	Civic	Pan-democracy	22 February 1958 (age 54); Hong Kong	Member of the Legislative Council for Kowloon East (since 2004); Leader of the Civic Party (since 2011)

== Results ==
Candidate	Votes	%
Jasper Tsang ✓	43	61.43
Alan Leong	27	38.57
Spoilt/rejected ballots	0	0
Turnout	70	100
