= 1997 President of the Hong Kong Provisional Legislative Council election =

Election for the President of the Provisional Legislative Council
← 1995	25 January 1997	1998 →
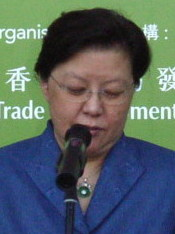

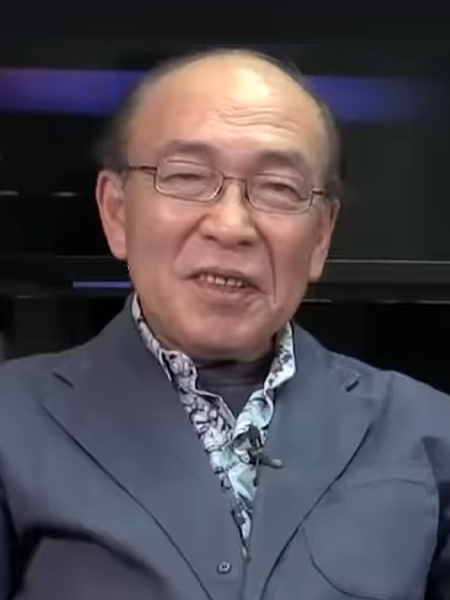
	Majority party	Minority party
Candidate	Rita Fan	Andrew Wong
Party	Independent	Independent
Votes	33 (55%)	27 (45%)
Elected President
Rita Fan
Independent

The election for the President of the Provisional Legislative Council took place on 25 January 1997 for members of the Provisional Legislative Council of Hong Kong to among themselves elect the President for the duration of the council. Rita Fan from the pro-Beijing camp defeated President of the colonial Legislative Council Andrew Wong and was elected.

== Election ==
The election of the President through secret ballot was held during the first-ever meeting of the Provisional Legislative Council (PLC).

The PLC was forced to meet in Shenzhen to remain outside the reach of Hong Kong law, as democracy groups called it illegal and threatened to take the PLC to court if its members try to gather in Hong Kong. The meeting was closed to the public, and journalists watched the proceedings on closed-circuit television.

Rita Fan, a key player in committees overseeing the handover with solid connections with women's groups and Beijing, beat the current Legislative Council president, Andrew Wong.

== Results ==
Candidate	Votes	%
Rita Fan ✓	33	55
Andrew Wong	27	45
Turnout	60	100

== Reaction ==
Chris Patten, Governor of Hong Kong, blasted the gathering as "a bad day for Hong Kong", and criticised the PLC for having "no legitimacy, no credibility and no authority in Hong Kong." Earlier calling the shadow legislature "a rather exotic debating society that meets on occasional Saturday mornings", Patten said he hopes "it will not embarrass Hong Kong too much".

CNN described Hong Kong's democratic future "may have suffered a blow" following this election. Pro-democracy camp in Hong Kong also disapproved the election, with Emily Lau from the Frontier believing Fan might politicise the presidency and "change the role of the president from speaker to a super leader of the body" for her strident stance.

Zhou Nan, China's de facto ambassador to Hong Kong, hailed Fan's election and suggested it would be a bad idea for the PLC to hold off until June before starting work on law-making. Zhou also claimed "now Hong Kong has a chance to create for itself a truly representative form of government."
