= 2008 President of the Hong Kong Legislative Council election =

Election for the President of the Fourth Legislative Council
← 2004	8 October 2008	2012 →
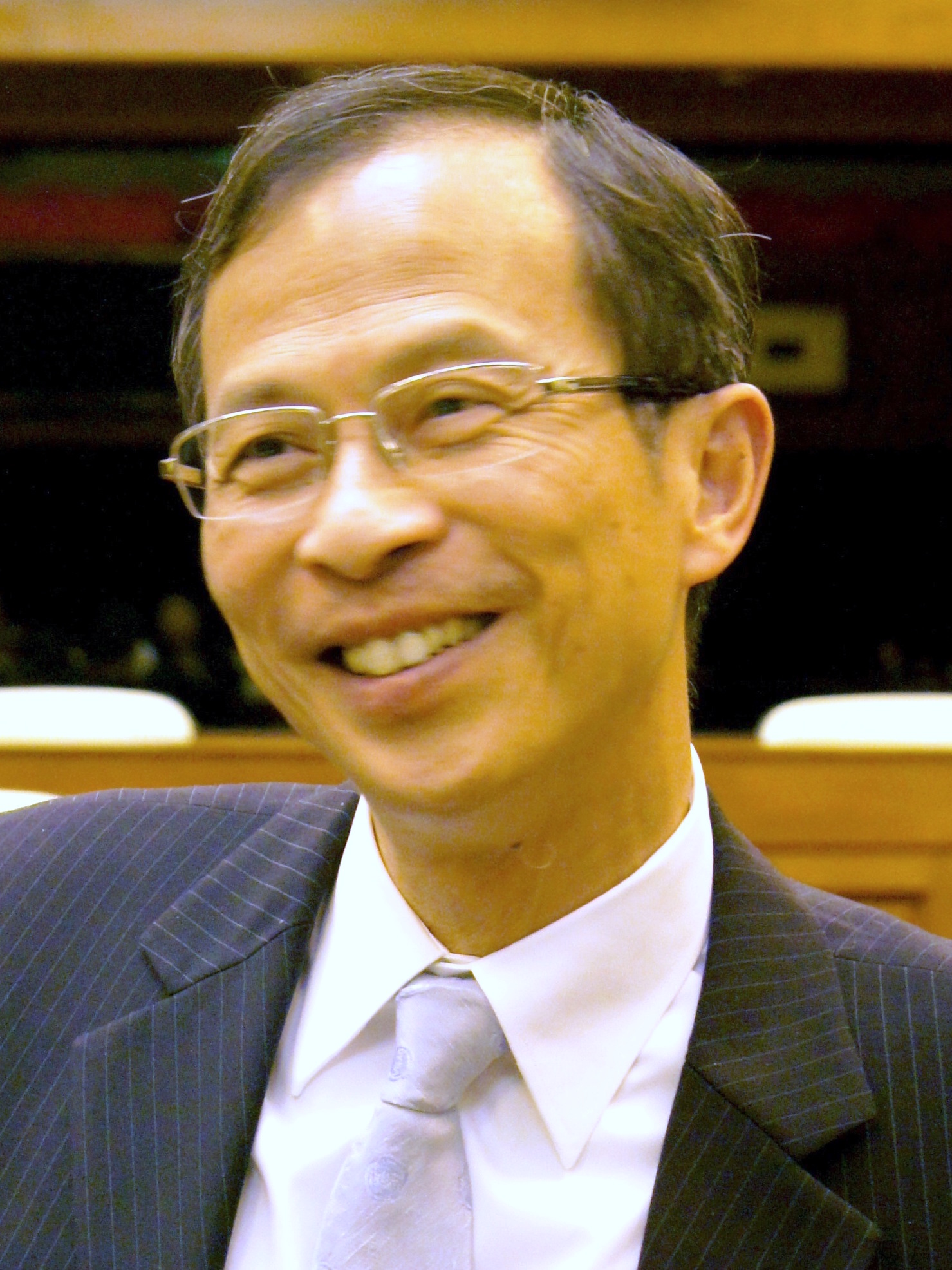

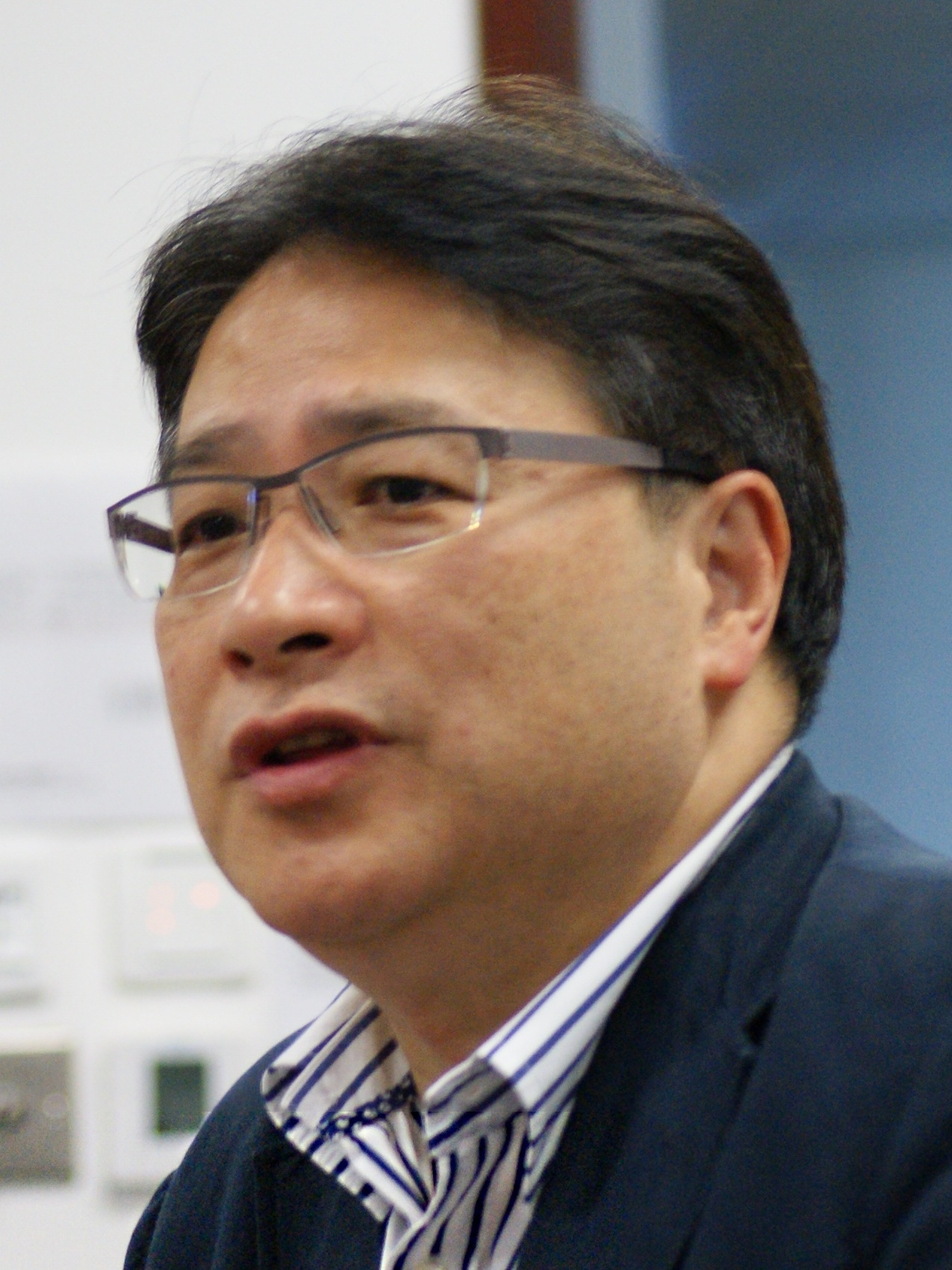
	Majority party	Minority party
Candidate	Jasper Tsang	Fred Li
Party	DAB	Democratic
Constituency	Hong Kong Island	Kowloon East
Votes	36 (60%)	24 (40%)
President before election
Rita Fan
Nonpartisan
Elected President
Jasper Tsang
DAB

The election for the President of the Fourth Legislative Council took place on 8 October 2008 for members of the 4th Legislative Council of Hong Kong to among themselves elect the President of the Legislative Council of Hong Kong for the duration of the Council.

== Proceedings ==
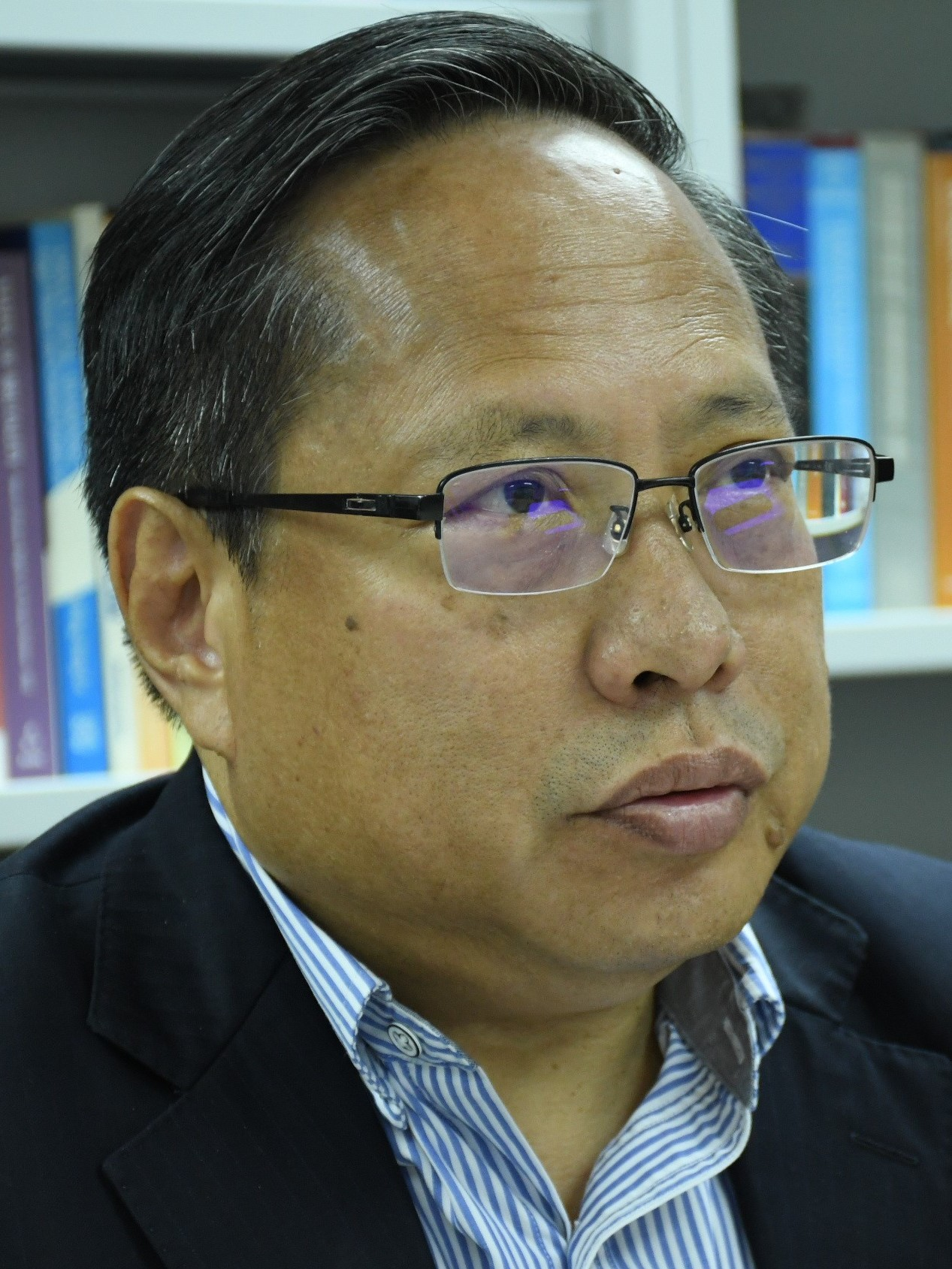
Albert Ho presided over the election

According to Article 71 of the Hong Kong Basic Law and Rule 4 of the Rules of Procedure of the Legislative Council, the President of the Legislative Council has to be a Chinese citizen of 40 years old or above, a permanent resident of Hong Kong with no right of abode in any foreign country, and has ordinarily resided in Hong Kong for not less than 20 years continuously.

Albert Ho, as the most senior member of the parliament, presided over the special forum on 6 October, which allowed candidates to present their manifesto and answer questions from other members, and the election. Before the voting began, Leung Kwok-hung and Chan Wai-yip, the two radical democrats, questioned if Tsang was a member of the Chinese Communist Party, but Ho insisted no Q&A for the voting session. Tsang, after election, also declined to comment.

== Candidates ==
Candidate	Party affiliation	Political camp	Born	Political office
Jasper Tsang; GBM JP	DAB	Pro-Beijing	17 May 1947 (age 61); Guangzhou, China	Chairman of Committee on Rules of Procedure of the Legislative Council (2004–2008); Member of the Legislative Council for Hong Kong Island (since 2008); Member of the Legislative Council for Kowloon West (1998–2008); Member of the Provisional Legislative Council (1996–1998); Non-official Member of the Executive Council (2002–2008); Chairman of the DAB (1992-2003)
Fred Li	Democratic	Pan-democracy	22 April 1955 (age 57); Hong Kong	Chair of Panel on Food Safety and Environmental Hygiene (2000–2006); Chair of Panel on Manpower (1998–1999); Member of the Legislative Council for Kowloon East (since 1998, 1991–1995); Member of the Legislative Council for Kowloon South-east (1995–1997); Member of the Kwun Tong District Council (1988–1994)

== Results ==
This election marks the first time in Hong Kong's history the presidency is occupied by a party member, as the predecessors are all independents or nonpartisans, despite they might lean towards political camps. Tsang thanked the colleagues' support and vowed to do his best. He also resigned as the member of the Executive Council to avoid role conflict.

As Li received 24 votes against 23 democrats, a member of the pro-Beijing camp voted for the rivalry Li from the pan-democracy camp in the secret ballot. However, it was also unknown whether all 23 democrats voted for Li.

Candidate	Votes	%
Jasper Tsang ✓	36	60
Fred Li	24	40
Spoilt/rejected ballots	0	0
Turnout	60	100
