= Hsu Ta Tung =

- Traditional Chinese: 徐大統
- Simplified Chinese: 徐大统
Transcriptions
Standard Mandarin
- Hanyu Pinyin: Xú Dàtǒng
- Wade–Giles: Hsü2 Ta4-t'ung3

Hsu Ta Tung (1909-1982), was a Chinese business magnate and the father of Yuan Kai (Lincoln) Hsu, Daisy Hsu and Rita Fan.

== Life ==
Hsu was born in Zhenhai County (current Zhenhai District), Ningbo, Zhejiang Province, Qing Dynasty. His father was a teacher at Chongzheng College (崇正書院), and he also graduated from this school.

Hsu went to Shanghai and joined a bank as a clerk. Three years later he and founded his own company in the paper industry named Ta-Tung (大統紙號) after himself. His company developed rapidly and the company was renamed Tung-Yi (統益紙號). In the late 1930s and 40s, he monopolized the paper business in eastern China and was known as the 'Magnate of Paper Industry' (紙業大王). He became chief director (理事長) of the Shanghai Trade Association (上海同業公會).

Hsu invested broadly in other sectors including banking and real estate. He became the major shareholder of Dah Sing Bank, established in Hong Kong in 1947 as mainland China turned communist.

His son Yuan Kai (Lincoln) Hsu (b.1936 d.2019), daughters Daisy Hsu and Rita Fan were born in Shanghai, with the latter named after American film star Rita Hayworth, who was then very popular in Shanghai. Hsu has four grand children, Lyndon Hsu (Yuan Kai Hsu), Andrew Fan Chun-wah, Stephanie Fan (Rita Fan-Hsu), and a granddaughter (Daisy Hsu).

=== Hong Kong ===
1949, Hsu moved his whole family to Hong Kong. He once became the largest single shareholder of Dah Sing Bank Limited. The number plate of his car was also famous in Hong Kong - HK1000. In later life he was involved in the charitable promotion of education in mainland China.

Hsu became a member of the Hong Kong Jockey Club and had interests in race horses, including Old Boy and New Boy, that raced in the mid 1970s and early part of the 1980s.

== Memorial ==
- Ta-Tung Bridge (大統橋) in Ningbo
- Hsu Ta Tung Memorial Building, at St. Stephen's Girls' College, Hong Kong
