= 1993 President of the Hong Kong Legislative Council election =

Election for the President of the Legislative Council, 1993–95 session
- 19 February 1993
	Majority party
Candidate	John Joseph Swaine
Party	Independent
Constituency	Appointed
Votes	Unopposed
President before election
Chris Patten
Nonpartisan
Elected President
John Joseph Swaine
Independent

An election for the president of the Legislative Council of Hong Kong took place on 19 February 1993 for members to among themselves elect the first President after abolishing the practice for the governor to preside. Deputy President John Joseph Swaine was unopposed and became the first elected president.

== Background ==
Hong Kong Royal Instructions was one of the principal constitutional documents of British Hong Kong that includes the formation of the Legislative Council.

The governor of Hong Kong had been mandated to preside at meetings of the council since the start of the British rule. In 1990, the position of Deputy President was created, who shall be appointed by the governor. (Note: Article XXI of the Hong Kong Royal Instructions (Amended in 1990) (1) The Governor shall, so far as is practicable, preside at meetings of the legislative council. (2) In the absence of the Governor from a meeting of the Legislative Council there shall preside at that meeting - (a) the Deputy President; or (b) in the absence of the Deputy President, the senior ex officio Member present. (3) The Governor may, by Instrument under the Public Seal, appoint any Member of the Legislative Council to be Deputy President of the Council who shall hold office as such in the Council during Our Pleasure and shall forthwith cease to be Deputy President of the Council if his appointment is revoked by the Governor, or he shall cease to be a Member of the Council. (4) The provisions of Article VI(2) of Our Letter Patent 1917 to 1990 shall apply to the appointment of a Deputy President and, in the absence of any such Instructions as are mentioned therein, the Governor shall, without delay, report to Us, through one of Our Principal Secretaries of State, every such appointment. (5) For the purposes of paragraph (2)(b) of this clause, the ex officio Members of the Council shall have seniority in the order in which their offices are specified in Article VI(1)(b) of Our said Letters Patent.) A year later, the governor was no longer required to attend every meetings. (Note: Article XXI(1) of the Hong Kong Royal Instructions (Amended in 1990) (1) The Governor shall be President of the Legislative Council and, when present at a meeting of the Council, shall preside.) David Wilson, then Governor of Hong Kong, announced he intended to appoint John Joseph Swaine as deputy in 1991. Swaine assumed office in the first meeting of the next session in October 1991. In his address to the council, Wilson confirmed most of the meetings of the council will be chaired by Swaine.

In October 1992, with the upcoming handover of Hong Kong, Chris Patten, the new governor, announced he is handing over the presidency of the council to elected president as soon as possible, as part of separating the non-government membership of the rxecutive and the legislative council. Patten also called on the council to develop further its relationship with the Government, and that he "will be answerable as the head of the executive to this Council rather than being restricted to the role of President".

Amendments announced in December 1992 and effective on 19 February 1993 ended the role of governor as the president. Both the president and president's deputy became elected posts by members of the council. (Note: Article XXI of the Hong Kong Royal Instructions (Amended in 1993) (1) There shall be a President of the Legislative Council who, when present at a meeting of the Council, shall preside. The President of the Legislative Council shall be elected from amongst their number by the Members of the Council excluding the ex officio Members. (2) In the absence of the Governor from a meeting of the Legislative Council there shall preside at that meeting - (a) the President's deputy who shall be elected from amongst their number by the Members of the Council excluding the ex officio Members; (b) in the absence of the President's deputy, the senior ex officio Member present. (3) For the avoidance of doubt, a reference to "the Member presiding" is to the President, the President's deputy or the senior ex officio Member present as the case may be.) The amendment therefore triggered the election of president for the first time in colonial history.

== Election ==
The election took place during the council meeting on 19 February 1993. David Ford, Chief Secretary and the most senior ex-officio member, presided over the proceedings. The president's deputy was first elected. Veteran legislator Elsie Tu was nominated by Andrew Wong, independent, and seconded by pro-business Stephen Cheong and pro-China Tam Yiu-chung. Without any other nominations, Tu was elected with unanimous support. She then proceeded to chair meeting.

For the election of president, John Swaine was backed by Allen Lee, convenor of Co-operative Resources Centre, Martin Lee, chairman of United Democrats, and Tam Yiu-chung. Tu declared Swaine, the only candidate, has been elected the president of the council.

Swaine said the appointment was symbolic of the council's progress towards independence from the executive council, and he is deeply honoured to be the first president. Swaine added he hoped to maintain the tradition of the impartial speaker, the dignity and integrity of the council to continue to serve the public.

Hamish Macleod, Financial Secretary, then moved the motion to amend the Standing Orders of the Legislative Council to bring it in line with the Royal Instructions, and to provide the framework for the governor to hand over the presidency of this council to an elected president. Macleod said the Government is "taking steps to amend the Royal Instructions further to accommodate the stand-in arrangements for the President as contemplated by Members" and will consult members. After the amendment was agreed to without opposition, the president adjourned the council.
