= John Joseph Swaine =

Hong Kong politician

The Honourable Sir John Joseph Swaine CBE QC SC JP

President of the Legislative Council
- In office 19 February 1993 – 31 July 1995
- Monarch: Elizabeth II
- Governor: Chris Patten
- Preceded by: Chris Patten
- Succeeded by: Andrew Wong

Deputy President of the Legislative Council
- In office 9 October 1991 – 19 February 1993
- Preceded by: Office Established
- Succeeded by: Office Abolished

Member of the Legislative Council
- In office 1 September 1980 – 31 July 1995
- Appointed by: Sir Murray MacLehose; Sir Edward Youde; Sir David Akers-Jones Acting; Sir David Wilson; Chris Patten

Personal details
- Born: 22 April 1932 Shanghai, Republic of China
- Died: 7 August 2012 (aged 80) Malta
- Children: John Joseph Edward Swaine; Jason Mark Swaine; Jeremy Nicholas Swaine
- Education: St Joseph's College; University of Hong Kong; Queens' College, University of Cambridge; Lincoln College, University of Oxford

Sir John Joseph Swaine, CBE, QC, SC, JP (Traditional Chinese: 施偉賢爵士; 22 April 1932 – 7 August 2012) was a Hong Kong lawyer, scholar and politician who served as the President of the Legislative Council of Hong Kong from 1993 to 1995 and the Chairman of the Hong Kong Jockey Club from 1993 to 1996. A barrister by training, Swaine was an appointed and unofficial member of the council. Before 1993, the President was the Governor of Hong Kong. Swaine was a law professor and an appointed member of the Legislative Council of Hong Kong, as one of the last unofficial members of the council.

== Early life and education ==
He was born on the 22 April 1932 in Shanghai to a mixed family of British and Chinese descent. His family later left Shanghai and moved to Hong Kong in 1937. He attended St. Joseph's Primary School and St. Joseph's College.

He attended the University of Hong Kong in 1948 and later graduated from the University of Hong Kong in 1952, obtaining a Bachelor of Arts degree. He also attended Queen's College, Cambridge University between 1952 and 1954. Swaine obtained a barrister qualification from Lincoln College, Oxford University in 1960.

== Career ==
He served as an Administrative Officer in the Hong Kong Government between 1952 and 1957 and was appointed to the Queen's Counsel in 1975 before becoming a appointed member of the Legislative Council of Hong Kong in 1980.

He was the Deputy President of the Council between 1991 and 1993, when the Governor Chris Patten refrained from presiding over the Council meetings. The post was abolished following the election of the President of the Legislative Council from amongst the councillors (thus replacing the Governor).

After his work at the Council, Swaine returned to the private practice of law.

== Family ==
The Swaine family (John Joseph, his son John Joseph Edward, and Jason Mark) owns Intergood Limited. John Joseph Edward Swaine is also a barrister and CEO of the Media Bank. His son John L. Swaine is a law student in England.

== Honors and awards ==
Swaine was appointed a Queen's Counsel in 1975, an Officer of the Order of the British Empire in 1980 and a Commander of the Order of the British Empire in 1987. He was knighted by Queen Elizabeth II in 1995.

== Death ==
He died in Malta on 7 August 2012 while on holiday at the age of 80.

Legislative Council of Hong Kong
New office	Deputy President of the Legislative Council; 1991–1993	Office abolished
Preceded by Chris Patten	President of the Legislative Council; 1993–1995	Succeeded by Andrew Wong
Sporting positions
Preceded by Sir William Purves	Chairman of the Royal Hong Kong Jockey Club; 1993–1996	Succeeded by Wong Chung-hin
