= 2016 President of the Hong Kong Legislative Council election =

Election for the President of the Sixth Legislative Council
- 12 October 2016
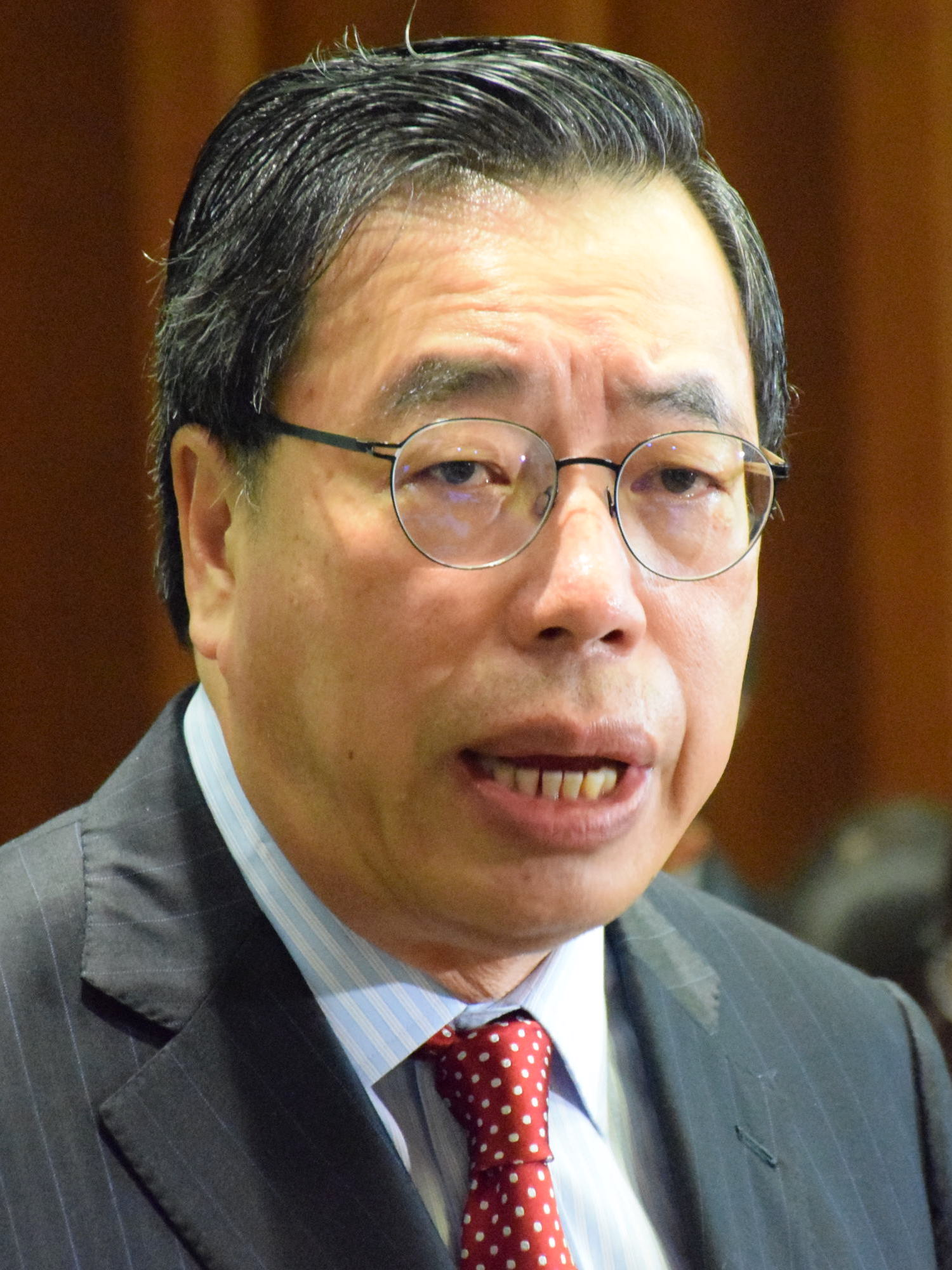

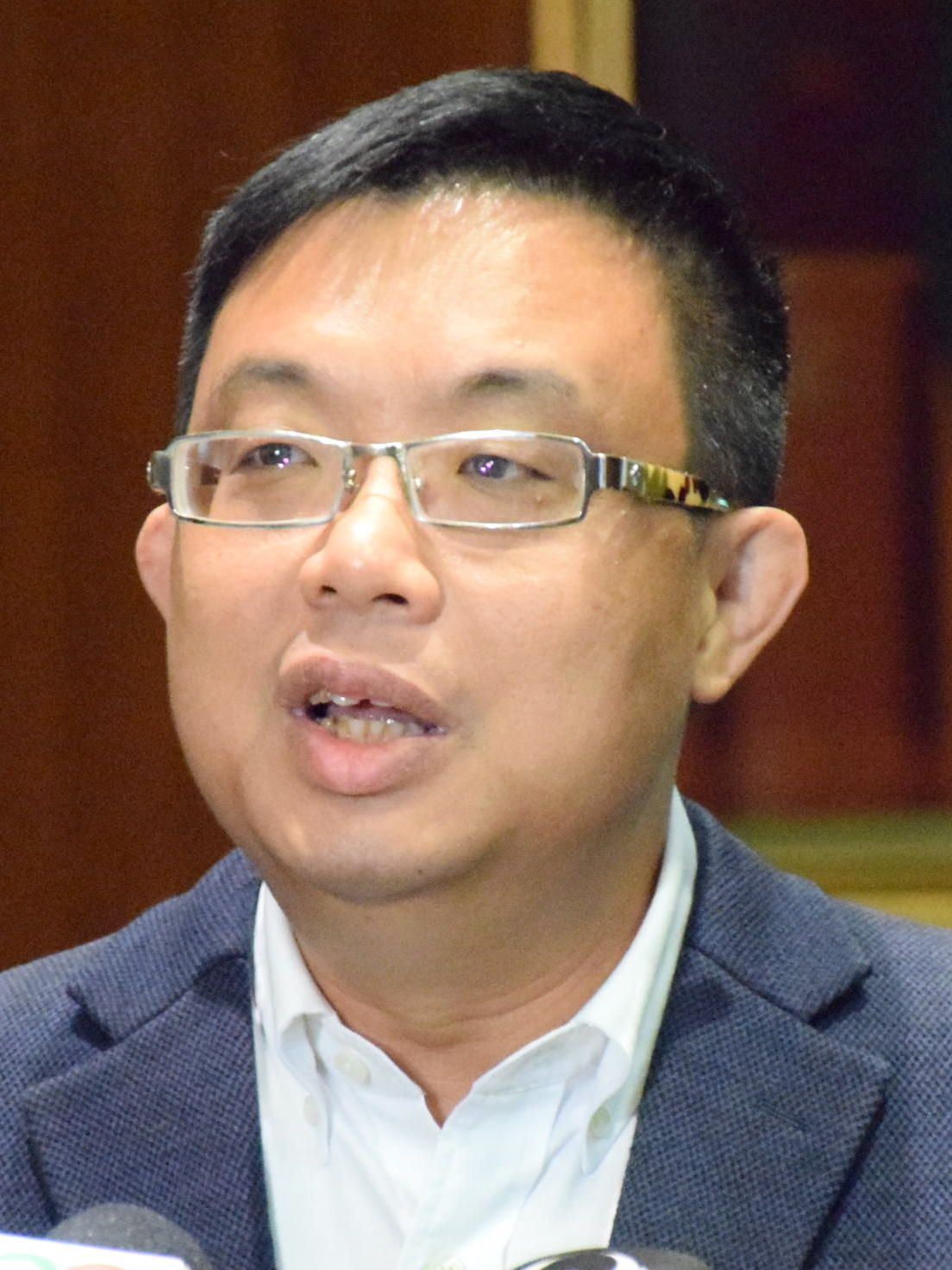
	Majority party	Minority party
Candidate	Andrew Leung	James To
Party	BPA	Democratic
Constituency	Industrial (First)	District Council (Second)
Votes	38 (58.46%)	0 (0%)
President before election
Jasper Tsang
DAB
Elected President
Andrew Leung
BPA

The election for the President of the Sixth Legislative Council took place on 12 October 2016 for members of the 6th Legislative Council of Hong Kong to among themselves elect the President of the Legislative Council of Hong Kong for the duration of the Council.

== Background ==
According to Article 71 of the Hong Kong Basic Law and Rule 4 of the Rules of Procedure of the Legislative Council, the President of the Legislative Council has to be a Chinese citizen of 40 years old or above, a permanent resident of Hong Kong with no right of abode in any foreign country, and has ordinarily resided in Hong Kong for not less than 20 years continuously. However, the Pro-Beijing camp candidate Andrew Leung had been British since the 1980s and hence would not be eligible to run for president should he not renounce his British citizenship. Pro-democracy camp lawmakers questioned his nationality and demanded the "declaration of renunciation", a document issued by the UK Home Office.

== Proceedings ==
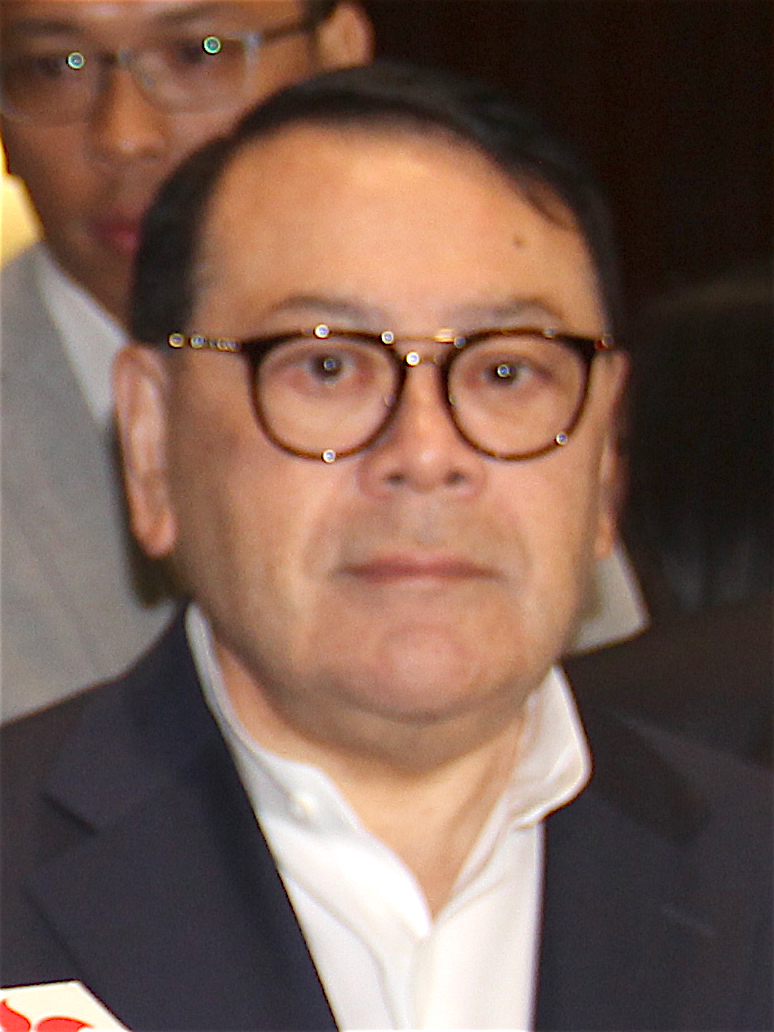
Abraham Shek presided over the election

Since James To who was the most senior member contested in the election, Leung Yiu-chung presided over the special forum and the election. Held on 11 October 2016, the special forum allowed candidates to present their manifesto and answer questions from other members. During the actual election on 12 October, Leung said the absence of provisions in the Rules of Procedures meant that no legal clarifications or explanations could be sought from the legal adviser or other staff. As such, he claimed that he could not preside over the meeting if his questions were not resolved and left the meeting.

As the second most senior member who did not run for president, Abraham Shek took the chair for the rest of the election. Shek swiftly ordered the ballots to be distributed despite some members shouting in protest. Opposition councillors boycotted the election and walked out the chamber without attending the vote count.

== Candidates ==
Candidate	Party affiliation	Political camp	Born	Political office
Andrew Leung; GBS MBE JP	BPA	Pro-Beijing	24 February 1951 (age 65); Hong Kong	Chairman of the House Committee of the Legislative Council (since 2012); Member of Legislative Council for Industrial (First) (since 2004); Chairman of the BPA (since 2012)
James To	Democratic	Pro-democracy	11 March 1963 (age 53); Hong Kong	Member of the Legislative Council for District Council (Second) (since 2012); Member of the Yau Tsim Mong District Council (2000-2007; since 2012); Member of the Legislative Council for Kowloon West (1998-2012); Member of the Legislative Council for Kowloon South-west (1995-1997); Member of the Legislative Council for Kowloon West (1991-1995)

== Results ==
Abraham Shek announced that Andrew Leung was duly elected at 17:30.

Candidate	Votes	%
Andrew Leung ✓	38	58.46
James To	0	0
Blank ballots	3	4.62
Other spoilt/rejected ballots	24	36.92
Turnout (out of 67 (Note: The clerk reported that Edward Yiu, Yau Wai-ching and Baggio Leung were ineligible to vote in the election.))	65	97.01

Before adjourning the meeting, Leung said he accepted the position with a heavy heart and hoped there would be more communication across both camps.
