= President of the Legislative Council of Hong Kong =

Presiding officer of the Legislative Council of Hong Kong

- 香港立法會主席
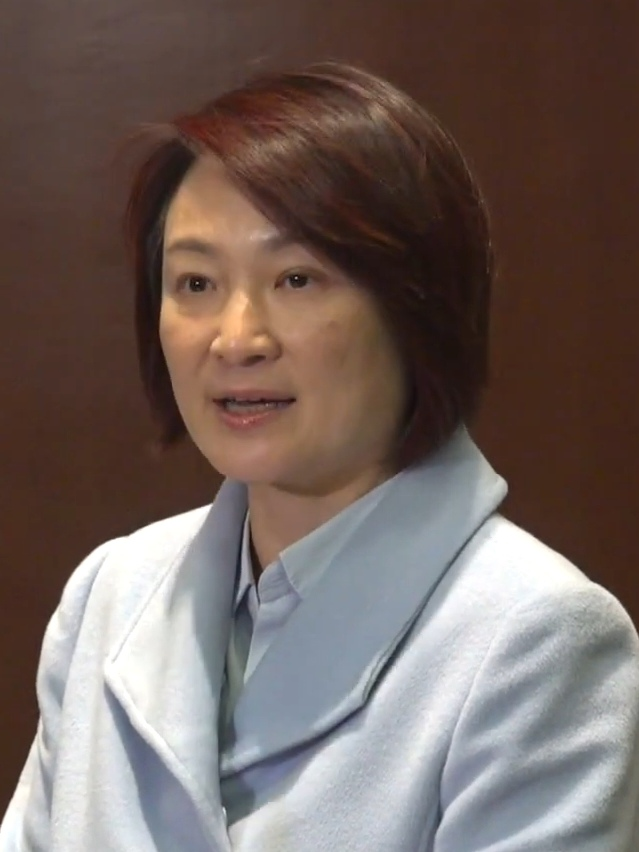
- Incumbent; Starry Lee since 8 January 2026
- Style: The Honourable (尊貴的) (formal)
- Nominator: Legislative Council
- Appointer: Legislative Council
- Term length: Four years, renewable
- Precursor: Governor of Hong Kong
- Inaugural holder: John Joseph Swaine
- Formation: 19 February 1993; 33 years ago
- Salary: HK$217,580 monthly (Note: 200% of the Legislative Councillor's remuneration)

President of the Legislative Council of Hong Kong
- Traditional Chinese: 香港特別行政區立法會主席
Transcriptions
Yue: Cantonese
- Yale Romanization: Hēung góng dahk biht hàhng jing kēui lahp faat wúi jyú jihk
- Jyutping: Hoeng1 gong2 dak6 bit6 hang4 zing3 koei1 lap6 faat3 wui2 zyu2 zik6

The president of the Legislative Council is the presiding officer of the Legislative Council of Hong Kong. According to the Article 71 of the Hong Kong Basic Law, the president of the Legislative Council is elected by and from among Legislative Council members, plays the presiding role, administrative role and ceremonial role, and ensures the smooth conduct of the Legislative Council meetings.

== History ==
From the establishment of the council in 1843 to 1993, the president of the Legislative Council of Hong Kong was the governor. In 1991, a deputy president, John Joseph Swaine, was appointed by the governor from among the non-official members to chair the sittings. The governor remained president and member, but systematically absented himself from most of the sittings. In February 1993, the governor ceased to be member and president of the council. The presidency was handed over to a member elected from among the unofficial members.

== Eligibility ==
Under the current system, the president shall be a Chinese citizen and permanent resident of Hong Kong of not less than 40 years of age, with no right of abode in any foreign country and has ordinarily resided in Hong Kong for continuous period of not less than 20 years.

== Roles ==
Under the Article 66 to 79 in the Basic Law, the Legislative Council Commission Ordinance Cap. 443, the Legislative Council (Powers and Privileges) Ordinance Cap. 382 and the Rules of Procedure of the Legislative Council of Hong Kong Special Administrative Region (RoP), the President performs the following roles in the council:

=== Presiding role ===
- The president presides over council meetings and ensures that businesses are transacted in an orderly way during the council meetings. In the absence of the president, the chairman of the House Committee serves as deputy to the president.
- The president determines the day and hours of the meetings and may change the agenda, suspend a meeting, or call a special meeting, or adjourn the Legislative Council.
- The president shall call emergency meetings at the request of the chief executive.
- The president is responsible for the observance of the rules of order in the Legislative Council. Decisions on a point of order shall be final.

==== Primacy of President ====
In a controversial move directed at reining in democratic legislators (most of whom were elected by universal suffrage and six of whose seats had been vacated by a controversial court order of disqualification), amendments to the Rules of Procedure were passed on 15 December 2017 giving sweeping powers to the president to control the business of the legislature. Among them is the power to vet proposed motions and amendments to bills, require legislators to explain them and to reject or merge them. Prior notice must be given of any notice of motion and the president may reconvene the chamber immediately after any failure to meet quorum.

=== Administrative role ===
The president is also the chairman of the Legislative Council Commission, a statutory body and provides administrative support and services for the Legislative Council and its members through the Legislative Council secretariat.

The Legislative Council Commission determines the organization and administration of support services and facilities, formulate and execute policies on their effective operation and expand funds in ways it see fit to support these activities.

=== Ceremonial role ===
The president is accorded the seventh place in the official precedence list following the chief executive, the Chief Justice of the Court of Final Appeal, former chief executives, the Chief Secretary for Administration, the Financial Secretary and the Secretary for Justice. The president is the representative of the Legislative Council on ceremonial and formal occasions.

== List of presidents ==
=== British Colonial period (1843–1941) ===
Before 1993, the Legislative Council was presided over by the Governor of Hong Kong.

=== Japanese occupation period (1941–1945) ===
From 25 December 1941 to 30 August 1945, the office was suspended due to the Japanese Occupation of Hong Kong. The representative advisory bodies during the time were the Chinese Representative Council and Chinese Cooperative Council.

=== Restoration to British rule (1946–1997) ===
Until 1993, the legislative council was presided over by the governor of Hong Kong. Between 1991 and 1993, a deputy president, John Joseph Swaine, was appointed by the then-governor David Wilson to chair the meetings in his absence. The governor then only attended the first session in October every year to present his policy address and gave a farewell speech to the members of the council before he left office. The president was elected among non-official members of the legislative council from 1993 onwards after the last governor Chris Patten having given up the presidency that year.

No.	Portrait	Name (Born–Died)	Term of office			Political Party	Constituency	Assembly
No.	Portrait	Name (Born–Died)	Took office	Left office	Duration	Political Party	Constituency	Assembly
		Sir John Joseph Swaine 施偉賢爵士 (1932–2012)	19 February 1993	30 September 1995	2 years, 223 days	Independent	Appointed	1991–95
		Andrew Wong 黃宏發 (born 1943)	11 October 1995	30 June 1997	1 year, 262 days	Independent	New Territories Southeast	1995–97

=== Provisional Legislative Council (1997–1998) ===
No.	Portrait	Name (Born–Died)	Term of office			Political Party	Constituency	Assembly
No.	Portrait	Name (Born–Died)	Took office	Left office	Duration	Political Party	Constituency	Assembly
		Rita Fan 范徐麗泰 (born 1945)	25 January 1997	30 June 1998	1 year, 156 days	Independent (Pro-Beijing)	N/A	PLC

=== SAR Legislative Council (1998–present) ===
No.	Portrait	Name (Born–Died)	Term of office			Political Party	Constituency	Assembly
No.	Portrait	Name (Born–Died)	Took office	Left office	Duration	Political Party	Constituency	Assembly
1		Rita Fan 范徐麗泰 (born 1945)	2 July 1998	30 September 2008	14 years, 81 days	Independent (Pro-Beijing)	Election Committee Hong Kong Island	1st 2nd 3rd
2		Jasper Tsang 曾鈺成 (born 1947)	8 October 2008	30 September 2016	7 years, 347 days	DAB (Pro-Beijing)	Hong Kong Island	4th 5th
3		Andrew Leung 梁君彥 (born 1951)	12 October 2016	31 December 2025	9 years, 91 days	BPA (Pro-Beijing)	Industrial (First)	6th 7th
4		Starry Lee 李慧琼 (born 1974)	8 January 2026	Incumbent	263 days	DAB (Pro-Beijing)	Kowloon Central	8th
