= Rita Fan =

Hong Kong politician

The Honourable Rita Fan GBM GBS CBE JP
- 范徐麗泰
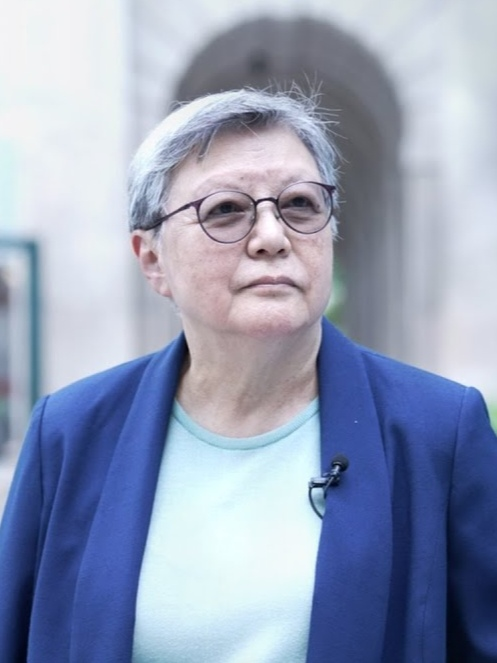
- Fan in 2024

Member of the National People's Congress Standing Committee
- In office March 2008 – 18 March 2018
- Preceded by: Tsang Hin-chi
- Succeeded by: Tam Yiu-chung

1st President of the Legislative Council
- In office 25 January 1997 – 30 September 2008
- Chief Executive: Tung Chee-hwa; Donald Tsang
- Preceded by: Andrew Wong (as President of the colonial Legislative Council)
- Succeeded by: Jasper Tsang

Unofficial Member of the Executive Council
- In office 1 January 1989 – 7 October 1992
- Appointed by: Sir David Wilson

Member of the Legislative Council
- In office 1 October 2004 – 30 September 2008
- Succeeded by: Cyd Ho
- Constituency: Hong Kong Island
- In office 1 July 1998 – 30 September 2004
- Constituency: Election Committee
- In office 21 December 1996 – 30 June 1998 (Provisional Legislative Council)
- In office 1 September 1983 – 6 October 1992
- Appointed by: Sir Edward Youde; Sir David Wilson

Personal details
- Born: Hsu Ching-li; 20 September 1945 (age 81) Shanghai, Republic of China
- Party: Liberal Party (until 1998); Independent (since 1998)
- Spouse: Stephen Fan Sheung-tak (m. 1974; died 2004)
- Relations: Hsu Ta Tung (father)
- Children: 2
- Education: St. Stephen's Girls' College
- Alma mater: University of Hong Kong (BS, MS)

Rita Fan
- Traditional Chinese: 范徐麗泰
- Simplified Chinese: 范徐丽泰
Transcriptions
Standard Mandarin
- Hanyu Pinyin: Fàn Xú Lìtài
Yue: Cantonese
- Yale Romanization: Faahn Chèuih Laih Taai
- Jyutping: Fan^{6} Cheui^{4} Lai^{6} Tai^{3}

Rita Fan Hsu Lai-tai GBM GBS CBE JP (Chinese: 范徐麗泰; née Hsu; born Hsu Ching-li (徐靜麗); born 20 September 1945) is a senior Hong Kong politician. She was the first President of the Hong Kong SAR Legislative Council from 1998 to 2008 and a former member of the Standing Committee of the National People's Congress (NPCSC) from 2008 to 2019.

First stepping into politics when she was appointed to the colonial Legislative Council in 1983, she rose to the Executive Council in 1989 until she resigned from the colonial services in 1992. She developed a close relationship with the Beijing authorities subsequently, assuming the office of the President of the Beijing-installed Provisional Legislative Council on the eve of the transfer of sovereignty over Hong Kong. She continued her position as the President of the SAR Legislative Council and first contested in the geographical constituency direct election in Hong Kong Island in 2004.

Shortly before retiring from the Legislative Council in 2008, Fan became the member of the Standing Committee of the National People's Congress (NPC) in 2008, where she had been the Hong Kong deputy of the national legislature from 1997. She served in the Standing Committee until her retirement in 2018.

== Early life and education ==
Hsu was born in Shanghai on 20 September 1945 to her father business magnate Hsu Ta Tung. Hsu Ta Tung was a business partner and assistant to Green Gang boss Du Yuesheng. The Hsu family followed Du to move to Hong Kong before the fall of Shanghai to the Chinese Communist Party during the Chinese Civil War when Rita Fan was only four.

Her English name Rita is named after Hollywood star Rita Hayworth. She studied at the St. Stephen's Girls' College before she obtained a Bachelor of Science degree in Chemistry and Physics from the University of Hong Kong. After her graduation, Hsu worked for the university for seven years and obtained a master's degree in Psychology during that time. She later joined Hong Kong Polytechnic as head of their Student Affairs Unit and, later, as associate director.

== Colonial political career ==
Fan first stepped into politics when she was appointed to the Legislative Council by Governor Edward Youde in 1983. To avoid any appearance of conflict of interest, she resigned from her post at the Hong Kong Polytechnic. As the convenor of the Security Panel in the Legislative Council, she dealt with the cross-border car smuggling problem at the time. She persuaded the Mainland authorities to require all cars driven on the Mainland to have left hand drives which meant the Hong Kong right hand drive car could no longer be smuggled into the Mainland before the mechanical overhaul. She was appointed chairman of the Board of Education from 1986 to 1989 and chairman of the Education Commission from 1990 to 1992.

Fan strongly espoused the case for mother tongue education and suggested that the government should increase the university graduates ratio of primary teachers. She insisted that the British Hong Kong government repatriate Vietnamese boat people who took refuge in Hong Kong, a major issue at the time, to protect the interests of the Hong Kong residents.

She was later appointed to the Executive Council by Governor David Wilson in 1989. After the first Legislative Council direct election which saw the emergence of the populist pro-democracy camp in the legislature, Fan joined the appointed members led by Allen Lee to form the conservative parliamentary group Co-operative Resources Centre in 1991, which soon transformed into Liberal Party. She held the position in the Executive and Legislative Councils, until she was told to resign from the Executive Council by the newly arrived Governor Chris Patten so he could reform the council. Due to Patten's confrontational approach in putting forward the constitutional reform proposal which was strongly opposed by the Beijing authorities, which Fan saw as "a threat to a smooth handover", she decided to resign from both the Executive and the Legislative Councils in 1992.

== Legislative Council President ==
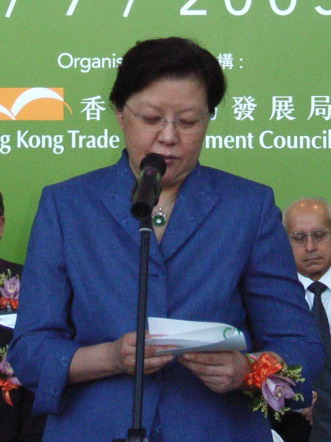
Fan in 2005

Soon after her retirement from the colonial government, she took a position in the Emperor Group run by Albert Yeung who had multiple criminal records which sparked controversy. In 1993, she also accepted Beijing's appointment to the Preliminary Working Committee, and later the Preparatory Committee for the establishment of the Hong Kong Special Administrative Region. She was later elected by the 400-strong Selection Committee to the Provisional Legislative Council, a provisional legislature installed by Beijing which the pro-democracy camp deemed as unconstitutional. She was elected the President of the Provisional Legislative Council. She was severely attacked for her switching side and was called "chameleon" and "Jiang Qing of Hong Kong", wife of Chairman Mao Zedong and the head of the Gang of Four.

The Provisional Legislative Council transited through the handover of Hong Kong in 1997. She ran in the Election Committee electoral college in the first SAR Legislative Council election in 1998. She continued to serve three consecutive terms as elected President of the Legislative Council from 1998. She ejected Leung Kwok-hung from the Legislative Council chamber in November 2004.

In the 2004 Legislative Council election, she ran in the Hong Kong Island geographical constituency direct election after the Election Committee electoral college seats were abolished. She received more than 65,000 votes, 18.5 per cent of the total vote share. She continued to serve in the Legislative Council for one more term until her retirement in 2008.

== National People's Congress Standing Committee ==
Fan was first elected to the National People's Congress in 1997. Shortly before her retirement from the Legislative Council in 2008, Fan was promoted to the Standing Committee. Among other services, she is also chairman of the Board of Trustees of the Association for Celebration of Reunification of Hong Kong with China Charitable Trust Fund, honorary adviser of the Hong Kong Federation of Women, patron of Hong Kong Kidney Foundation and Hong Kong Transplant Sports Association and Whole Person Education Foundation.

In the 2012 Chief Executive election, Fan had expressed her interest in the post. Despite topping in the opinion polls originally, Fan lost a lot of public support and respect by taking six months to consider her candidacy. After much prevarication-induced speculation, Fan announced that she would not participate because her age and health would become concerns into the Chief Executive term; and she endorsed Chief Secretary for Administration Henry Tang instead when Tang showed his intention to run, However, when the extramarital affair of Henry Tang was exposed, Fan withdrew her support for him. After former Convenor of the Executive Council Leung Chun-ying won the election, Fan remained critical of the Leung administration. She believed her criticism toward Leung had cost her votes which plunged from 2,896 to 2,790 in her 2013 re-election to the Standing Committee.

Fan did not seek for re-election in the 2017 National People's Congress election due to the unofficial 70-year-old age limit.

== After NPCSC ==
In February 2021, Fan said that those who want to run in the Legislative Council should be nominated by the election committee, and that district councillors should be banned from selecting the Chief Executive. In addition, Fan claimed that "Why have we seen the chaos in Hong Kong? That's because non-patriots with ill-intent and those who want to use foreign powers to destroy Hong Kong's prosperity and stability were elected. They then created trouble in Legco and district councils. That made Hong Kong an unfavourable place to live and work."

In March 2021, Fan claimed that electoral changes by the NPCSC to only allow "patriots" to serve in the government might lead to earlier universal suffrage for the Chief Executive position.

In August 2022, after John Lee and other government officials criticized Nancy Pelosi over visiting Taiwan, despite Article 13 of the Basic Law stipulating that the local government is not responsible for foreign affairs, Fan said that Lee and the government had not contradicted the Basic Law.

In April 2023, Fan said that District Councils should have democratically elected seats limited to 22%, to protect from "Western forces or Taiwan independence advocates."

== Personal life ==
She married businessman Stephen Fan Sheung-tak in 1974 until his death from liver cancer in 2004. The couple had a son Andrew and a daughter Stephanie. Their daughter suffered from renal failure in 1995, and Fan donated a kidney to save her daughter's life. Fan was diagnosed with breast cancer in 2001 and underwent a mastectomy. She is Honorary President of the Hong Kong Breast Cancer Foundation.

== See also ==
- National People's Congress
- Legislative Council of Hong Kong
- Politics of Hong Kong
- List of graduates of University of Hong Kong

Legislative Council of Hong Kong
Preceded by Andrew Wong as President of the Legislative Council	President of the Provisional Legislative Council; 1997–1998	Succeeded by Herself as President of the Legislative Council
Preceded by Herself as President of the Provisional Legislative Council	President of the Legislative Council; 1998–2008	Succeeded by Jasper Tsang
New parliament	Member of Legislative Council; Representative for Election Committee; 1998–2004	Constituency eliminated
New seat	Member of Legislative Council; Representative for Hong Kong Island; 2004–2008	Succeeded by Cyd Ho
National People's Congress
Preceded by Tsang Hin-chi	Member of Standing Committee; Representative for Hong Kong SAR; 2008–2018	Succeeded by Tam Yiu-chung
Order of precedence
Preceded by Charles Lee; Recipient of the Grand Bauhinia Medal	Hong Kong order of precedence Recipient of the Grand Bauhinia Medal	Succeeded by David Li; Recipient of the Grand Bauhinia Medal
