= Andrew Wong (politician) =

Hong Kong politician

Andrew Wong OBE JP
- 黃宏發
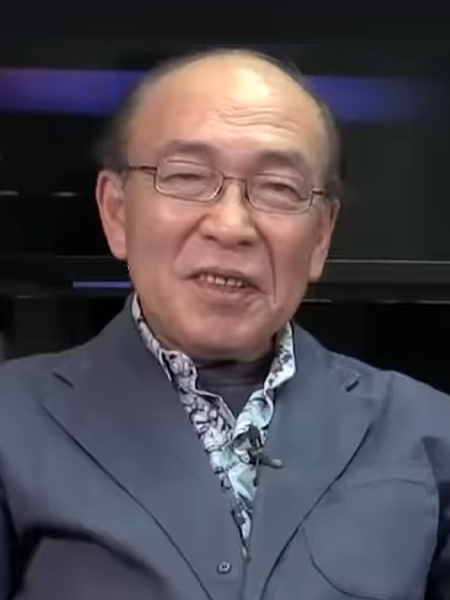
- Wong in 2018

President of the Legislative Council
- In office 11 October 1995 – 30 June 1997
- Monarch: Elizabeth II
- Governor: Chris Patten
- Preceded by: Sir John Joseph Swaine
- Succeeded by: Rita Fan

Member of the Legislative Council
- In office 1 July 1998 – 30 September 2004
- Preceded by: New parliament
- Succeeded by: Leung Kwok-hung
- Constituency: New Territories East
- In office 21 December 1996 – 30 June 1998 (Provisional Legislative Council)
- In office 11 October 1995 – 30 June 1997
- Preceded by: New constituency
- Succeeded by: Replaced by Provisional Legislative Council
- Constituency: New Territories South-east
- In office 30 October 1985 – 31 July 1995
- Preceded by: New constituency
- Succeeded by: Constituency abolished
- Constituency: New Territories East

Personal details
- Born: 11 December 1943 (age 82) Shanghai, Republic of China
- Spouse: Rita Pun Ming-chu
- Education: Wah Yan College
- Alma mater: University of Hong Kong (BA); Syracuse University (MPA); London School of Economics and Political Science (MPhil)

Andrew Wong
- Traditional Chinese: 黃宏發
Transcriptions
Yue: Cantonese
- Yale Romanization: Wòhng Wàhng faat
- Jyutping: Wong^{4} Wang^{4} faat^{3}

Andrew Wong Wang-fat OBE, JP (Chinese: 黃宏發; born 11 December 1943) is a Hong-Kong politician who was the last president of the Legislative Council during British rule. He was the second person of Chinese ethnicity to have served in the position during British rule, having been supported by the pan-democracy camp.

== Early life and education ==
Andrew Wong was born in Shanghai, Republic of China in 11 December 1943 and later moved to Tai Hom Village in Hong Kong. He attended Wing Hong Middle School and St. Louis Secondary School. He attended Wah Yan College, an all-male Jesuit secondary school in Hong Kong, after which studied at the University of Hong Kong, Syracuse University in the United States and completed an MPhil at the London School of Economics and Political Science (LSE) in the United Kingdom. Wong is often referred to by the nickname "Uncle Fat" (Chinese: "發叔").

== Career ==
Wong first served in the Sha Tin District Board from 1981 to 1991. He was also a lecturer in the Department of Government and Public Administration of the Chinese University of Hong Kong.

He was first elected into the Legislative Council of Hong Kong in 1985, Wong was elected by his fellow members of the Council to the position of its president in 1995. He held the position until 30 June 1997, when the sovereignty of Hong Kong was transferred from the United Kingdom to the People's Republic of China.

He served in the Provisional Legislative Council from 1997 to 1998, and was re-elected to the Legislative Council in 1998, and in 2000, after the transfer of sovereignty. He lost his seat at the 2004 Legislative Council elections and was succeeded by Leung Kwok-hung.

In 2021, Wong published 60 Chinese Poems in English Verse. The book is a collection of 60 quatrain poems from the Tang Dynasty which Wong translated from ancient Chinese into English. In his translation Wong focuses on translating into accentual verse to make the poems melodious to the English ear.

Legislative Council of Hong Kong
New constituency	Member of Legislative Council; Representative for New Territories East; 1991–1995; Served alongside: Emily Lau	Succeeded by Himself as Representative for New Territories South-east
Preceded by Anson Chan	Chairman of Finance Committee; 1994–1995	Succeeded by Ronald Arculli
Preceded by Himself as Representative for New Territories East	Member of Legislative Council; Representative for New Territories South-east; 1995–1997	Replaced by Provisional Legislative Council
Preceded by John Joseph Swaine	President of the Legislative Council; 1995–1997	Succeeded by Rita Fan as President of the Provisional Legislative Council
New parliament	Member of Provisional Legislative Council; 1997–1998	Replaced by Legislative Council
New parliament	Member of Legislative Council; Representative for New Territories East; 1998–2004	Succeeded by Leung Kwok-hung
